= 2011–12 Belgian Second Division =

Belgian Second Division
- Season: 2011–12
- Champions: Charleroi
- Promoted: Charleroi; Waasland-Beveren
- Relegated: Dender EH; Wetteren
- Matches: 306
- Goals: 815 (2.66 per match)
- Top goalscorer: Harlem Gnohéré

The 2011–12 season of the Belgian Second Division (also known as EXQI League for sponsorship reasons) started in August 2011 and is the second tier football league in Belgium. The league is played by 18 teams, with 34 matchdays of 9 matches each, so each team plays the 17 other teams twice. The season is divided into 3 periods, the first period of 10 matches, the second of 12 matches and the third of 12 matches. Each period winner qualifies for the Belgian Second Division final round. On 14 April 2012, Charleroi became champions without playing as closest rivals Eupen and Oostende both did not manage to win their matches and thereby could no longer mathematically overtake Charleroi in the standings.

== Team changes ==
After promotion and relegation, only 13 teams remained in the league, with 5 other being replaced:

=== Out ===
- Oud-Heverlee Leuven were promoted as champions of the previous season.
- Mons ended third, but won the second division final round and was therefore also promoted to the Pro League.
- Turnhout ended 16th, but lost the third division playoffs and was subsequently relegated.
- Rupel Boom was relegated to the Third Division after finishing 17th.
- Tournai was relegated to the Third Division after finishing 18th.

=== In ===
- Charleroi was directly relegated from the Pro League.
- Eupen lost the second division final round and as a result they were also relegated from the Pro League.
- Aalst promoted as champions from Third Division A.
- WS Woluwe promoted as champions from Third Division B.
- Sint-Niklaas was promoted after winning the third division playoffs.

== Team information ==
=== Personnel and locations ===
Location of teams in Belgian Second Division 2011-12

Club	City	Current manager
V.C. Eendracht Aalst 2002	Aalst	(Belgium) Bart Van Renterghem
Royal Antwerp F.C.	Antwerp	(Belgium) Bart Wilmssen
K.V. Red Star Waasland-Beveren	Beveren	(Belgium) Dirk Geeraerd
R. Boussu Dour Borinage	Boussu	(France) Arnauld Mercier
FC Brussels	Sint-Jans-Molenbeek	(Belgium) Stéphane Demol
S. du Pays de Charleroi	Charleroi	(Netherlands) Dennis van Wijk
F.C.V. Dender E.H.	Denderleeuw	(Belgium) Vital Borkelmans
K.A.S. Eupen	Eupen	(Germany) Wolfgang Frank
K.S.K. Heist	Heist-op-den-Berg	(Belgium) Cis Bosschaerts
K.V. Oostende	Ostend	(Belgium) Frederik Vanderbiest
Lommel United	Lommel	(Belgium) Philip Haagdoren
K.S.V. Roeselare	Roeselare	(Ukraine) Serhiy Serebrennikov
F.C.N. Sint-Niklaas	Sint-Niklaas	(Belgium) Alex Czerniatynski
K.V.K. Tienen	Tienen	(Belgium) Dany Ost
A.F.C. Tubize	Tubize	(Belgium) Dante Brogno
R.C.S. Visé	Wezet	(Italy) Loris Dominissini
Standaard Wetteren	Wetteren	(Belgium) Kris Van Der Haegen
White Star Woluwe F.C.	Woluwe-Saint-Lambert	(Belgium) Felice Mazzu

=== Managerial changes ===
==== During summer break ====
Team	Outgoing manager	Manner of departure	Date of vacancy	Replaced by	Date of appointment
Eupen	(Belgium) Danny Ost	Contract Ended.	End of 2010-11 season	(Germany) Wolfgang Frank	4 July 2011
Standaard Wetteren	(Belgium) Wim De Corte	Became assistant-trainer at (Belgium) Beerschot AC.	End of 2010-11 season	(Belgium) Kris Van Der Haegen	28 June 2011
Charleroi	(Croatia) Luka Peruzović	Contract Ended.	End of 2010-11 season	(Belgium) Jos Daerden	29 June 2011
Roeselare	(Belgium) Nico Vanderdonck	Contract Ended.	End of 2010-11 season	(Ukraine) Serhiy Serebrennikov	30 June 2011
Visé	(Belgium) José Riga	Signed for (Belgium) Standard Liège.	28 June 2011	(Switzerland) Vittorio Bevilacqua	1 July 2011
Visé	(Switzerland) Vittorio Bevilacqua	Mutual Consent.	8 July 2011	(Belgium) Marc Grosjean	9 July 2011

==== During regular season ====
Team	Outgoing manager	Manner of departure	Date of vacancy	Replaced by	Date of appointment	Position in table
Lommel United	(Belgium) Franky Van der Elst	Signed for (Belgium) Sint-Truiden.	2 September 2011	(Belgium) Philip Haagdoren	6 September 2011	8th
Visé	(Belgium) Marc Grosjean	Fired.	19 September 2011	(Italy) Loris Dominissini	22 September 2011	8th
Charleroi	(Belgium) Jos Daerden	Fired.	26 September 2011	(Hungary) Tibor Balogh	26 September 2011	8th
Tienen	(Belgium) Valère Billen	Fired.	7 October 2011	(Belgium) Ronny Schuermans	19 October 2011	12th
Brussels	(Belgium) Michel De Wolf	Mutual Consent.	9 October 2011	(Belgium) Christian Rits	9 October 2011	17th
Sint-Niklaas	(Belgium) Regi Van Acker	Fired.	12 October 2011	(Belgium) Chris Andries	12 October 2011	12th
Antwerp	(Belgium) Bart De Roover	Fired.	13 November 2011	(Belgium) Bart Wilmssen	15 November 2011	8th
Tubize	(Belgium) Dany Ost	Fired.	20 November 2011	(Belgium) Laurent Demol	20 November 2011	18th
Sint-Niklaas	(Belgium) Chris Andries	Replaced.	2 January 2012	(Belgium) Alex Czerniatynski	2 January 2012	17th
Brussels	(Belgium) Christian Rits	Caretaker replaced.	15 February 2012	(Belgium) Stéphane Demol	15 February 2012	13th
Charleroi	(Hungary) Tibor Balogh	Fired.	22 February 2012	(Belgium) Mario Notaro	23 February 2012	2nd
Tubize	(Belgium) Laurent Demol	Caretaker replaced.	27 February 2012	(Belgium) Dante Brogno	27 February 2012	16th
Tienen	(Belgium) Ronny Schuermans	Caretaker replaced.	27 February 2012	(Belgium) Dany Ost	27 February 2012	17th
Charleroi	(Belgium) Mario Notaro	Replaced.	5 March 2012	(Netherlands) Dennis van Wijk	5 March 2012	1st

== Regular season ==
=== League table ===
Pos	Team	Pld	W	D	L	GF	GA	GD	Pts	Promotion or relegation
1	Charleroi (C, P)	34	23	5	6	64	34	+30	74	Belgian First Division
2	Waasland-Beveren (P)	34	21	5	8	61	34	+27	68	Qualification for Promotion play-off
3	Eupen	34	19	11	4	61	34	+27	68	Qualification for Promotion play-off
4	Oostende	34	19	9	6	61	29	+32	66	Qualification for Promotion play-off
5	Lommel	34	15	7	12	48	42	+6	52	
6	Woluwe	34	14	9	11	48	43	+5	51	
7	Aalst	34	13	7	14	46	52	−6	46	
8	Heist	34	11	13	10	46	46	0	46	
9	Visé	34	12	8	14	44	41	+3	44	
10	Antwerp	34	12	7	15	39	42	−3	43	
11	Borinage	34	12	6	16	44	54	−10	42	
12	Tubize	34	12	5	17	36	55	−19	41	
13	Roeselare	34	9	13	12	46	51	−5	40	
14	Brussels	34	9	11	14	44	46	−2	38	
15	Sint-Niklaas	34	8	10	16	41	54	−13	34	
16	Tienen (R)	34	9	6	19	34	61	−27	33	Qualification for Relegation play-off
17	Dender (R)	34	6	15	13	33	43	−10	33	Relegation to 2012–13 Belgian Third Division
18	Wetteren (R)	34	4	9	21	19	54	−35	21	Relegation to 2012–13 Belgian Third Division

Updated to match(es) played on 18 May 2012. Source: Soccerway
Rules for classification: 1) points; 2) number of matches won; if teams are still tied a playoff is organised.
(C) Champions; (P) Promoted; (R) Relegated

=== Period winners ===
The season is divided into three periods. The first ten matchdays together form the first period, matchdays 11 to 22 form period two and the last 12 form period three. The three period winners take part in the Belgian Second Division final round together with the winner of the 2011–12 Belgian Pro League relegation playoff. The winner of this final round gets to play in the 2012–13 Belgian Pro League. In case one or more periods are won by the team winning the league or in case one team wins multiple periods, the extra places go the teams finishing the highest in the league not already qualified. So in the theoretical case that one team wins all three periods and becomes the league champion, then the teams in positions 2, 3 and 4 will take part in the final round.

==== Period 1 ====
Already after the first nine matches of the season, Eupen clinched the first period title.

Pos	Team	Pld	W	D	L	GF	GA	GD	Pts	Qualification
1	Eupen	10	8	2	0	25	9	+16	26	Belgian Second Division final round
2	Charleroi	10	6	2	2	22	15	+7	20	
3	Waasland-Beveren	10	6	1	3	15	8	+7	19	
4	Oostende	10	5	4	1	19	11	+8	19	
5	Lommel	10	5	3	2	14	9	+5	18	

Updated to match(es) played on 23 October 2011. Source:
Rules for classification: 1) points; 2) number of matches won; if teams are still tied a playoff is organised.

==== Period 2 ====
Pos	Team	Pld	W	D	L	GF	GA	GD	Pts	Qualification
1	Charleroi	12	9	1	2	18	6	+12	28	Belgian Second Division final round
2	Eupen	12	7	3	2	19	9	+10	24	
3	Oostende	12	6	3	3	23	10	+13	21	
4	Waasland-Beveren	12	6	3	3	18	17	+1	21	
5	Heist	12	6	2	4	22	16	+6	20	

Updated to match(es) played on 27 February 2012. Source:
Rules for classification: 1) points; 2) number of matches won; if teams are still tied a playoff is organised.

==== Period 3 ====
Pos	Team	Pld	W	D	L	GF	GA	GD	Pts	Qualification
1	Waasland-Beveren	12	9	1	2	25	8	+17	28	Belgian Second Division final round
2	Charleroi	12	8	2	2	24	13	+11	26	
3	Oostende	12	8	2	2	19	5	+14	26	
4	Tubize	12	7	2	3	17	14	+3	23	
5	Woluwe	12	5	3	4	15	14	+1	18	

Updated to match(es) played on 16 May 2012. Source:
Rules for classification: 1) points; 2) number of matches won; if teams are still tied a playoff is organised.

== Top goalscorers ==
Including matches played on 29 April 2012; Source: Soccerway

Rank	Player	Club	Goals
1	(Cameroon) Hervé Onana	Waasland-Beveren	18
2	(Senegal) Moussa Gueye	SC Charleroi	17
3	(France) Samy Houri	FC Brussels	15
3	(Germany) Christian Santos	AS Eupen	15
5	(Belgium) Janis Coppin	FC Dender	14
5	(Belgium) Anthony Di Lallo	SV Roeselare	14
5	(Greece) Ioannis Masmanidis	AS Eupen	14
5	(France) Mickael Seoudi	Waasland-Beveren	14
9	(Belgium) Davy Brouwers	Lommel United	13
9	(Greece) Stavros Glouftsis	Sportkring Sint-Niklaas	13
9	(Belgium) Bart Webers	K.S.K. Heist	13
12	(Ivory Coast) Koffi	Boussu Dour Borinage	12
12	(Brazil) Daniel Rodrigo de Oliveira	White Star Woluwe F.C.	12
14	(France) Emmanuel Françoise	C.S. Visé	11
14	(France) Raphaël Lecomte	C.S. Visé	11
