= 2010–11 Belgian Pro League =

108th season of top-tier football in Belgium

Jupiler Pro League
- Season: 2010–11
- Champions: Genk
- Relegated: Charleroi; Eupen
- Champions League: Genk; Standard
- Europa League: Anderlecht; Club Brugge; Westerlo
- Matches: 300
- Goals: 798 (2.66 per match)
- Top goalscorer: Ivan Perišić (22 goals)
- Biggest home win: Standard 7–0 Lierse (27 November 2010)
- Biggest away win: Charleroi 0–5 Club Brugge (19 September 2010)
- Highest scoring: Gent 5–3 Zulte-Waregem (19 September 2010); Gent 4–4 Westerlo (20 November 2010); Westerlo 7–1 Zulte-Waregem (7 May 2011)
- Longest winning run: 5 matches Genk, Lokeren
- Longest unbeaten run: 15 matches Anderlecht
- Longest losing run: 7 matches Charleroi

The 2010–11 season of the Belgian Pro League (also known as Jupiler Pro League for sponsorship reasons) is the 108th season of top-tier football in Belgium. It began on 30 July 2010 with the first match of the regular season and ended in May 2011 with the last matches of the playoff rounds. Anderlecht were the defending champions.

== Changes from 2009–10 ==
For the second time, a system of playoffs was used to determine the Belgian champions (contested by the top 6 teams after the regular season) and which teams would play in Europe the following season (teams ranked 7–14 playoff after the regular season with the winner entering a further playoff for the chance to 'steal' the European place of the lowest ranked team in the Top 6 playoff). In terms of relegation, a playoff was introduced between the 15th and 16th team after the regular season; those teams would play each other 5 times in a mini-league, with the team which finished fifteenth playing at home in matches 1, 3 and 5 and starting with a 3-point bonus. The loser of this playoff series would be relegated, whilst the winner would play the Second division relegation playoff with three teams from the Belgian Second Division for the chance to retain its place in first division.

== Teams ==
On 28 December 2009, during the previous season, Mouscron went bankrupt and was immediately relegated. Roeselare ended the season in 15th place, forcing them to take part in the relegation playoffs. As they lost these playoffs they were also relegated and replaced by playoff winners Eupen. With this, Eupen became the first ever team from the German community to play at the highest level of Belgian football. Earlier, Belgian Second Division champions Lierse had been directly promoted.

=== Stadia and locations ===
Location of teams in Belgian Pro League 2010–11

Club	Location	Venue	Capacity
R.S.C. Anderlecht	Anderlecht	Constant Vanden Stock Stadium	28,063
Cercle Brugge K.S.V.	Bruges	Jan Breydel Stadium	29,945
R. Charleroi S.C.	Charleroi	Stade du Pays de Charleroi	24,891
Club Brugge K.V.	Bruges	Jan Breydel Stadium	29,945
K.A.S. Eupen	Eupen	Kehrweg Stadion	8,300
K.R.C. Genk	Genk	Cristal Arena	24,900
K.A.A. Gent	Ghent	Jules Ottenstadion	12,919
K.F.C. Germinal Beerschot	Antwerp	Olympisch Stadion	13,132
K.V. Kortrijk	Kortrijk	Guldensporen Stadion	9,500
Lierse S.K.	Lier	Herman Vanderpoortenstadion	14,538
K.S.C. Lokeren Oost-Vlaanderen	Lokeren	Daknamstadion	10,000
KV Mechelen	Mechelen	Veolia Stadium Achter de Kazerne	13,123
K. Sint-Truidense V.V.	Sint-Truiden	Staaienveld	11,250
Standard Liège	Liège	Stade Maurice Dufrasne	30,000
K.V.C. Westerlo	Westerlo	Het Kuipje	10,790
S.V. Zulte-Waregem	Waregem	Regenboogstadion	8,500

=== Personnel and sponsoring ===
Club	Chairman	Current manager	Team captain	Kitmaker	Shirt sponsor
R.S.C. Anderlecht	(Belgium) Roger Vanden Stock	(Belgium) Ariel Jacobs	(Argentina) Lucas Biglia	Adidas	BNP Paribas Fortis
Cercle Brugge K.S.V.	(Belgium) Frans Schotte	(Belgium) Bob Peeters	(Belgium) Denis Viane	Masita	A D M B
R. Charleroi S.C.	(Iran) Abbas Bayat	(Croatia) Luka Peruzović	(France) Rudy Riou	Masita	VOO
Club Brugge K.V.	(Belgium) Pol Jonckheere	(Netherlands) Adrie Koster	(Belgium) Carl Hoefkens	Puma	Dexia
K.A.S. Eupen	(Belgium) Dieter Steffens	(Belgium) Danny Ost	(Switzerland) Danijel Milićević	Jartazi	Jartazi
K.R.C. Genk	(Belgium) Herbert Houben	(Belgium) Franky Vercauteren	(Hungary) Dániel Tőzsér	Nike	Euphony
K.A.A. Gent	(Belgium) Ivan De Witte	(Belgium) Francky Dury	(Belgium) Bernd Thijs	Jako	VDK
K.F.C. Germinal Beerschot	(Belgium) Jos Verhaegen	(Belgium) Jacky Mathijssen	(Belgium) Philippe Clement	Joma	Quick
K.V. Kortrijk	(Belgium) Jozef Allijns	(Belgium) Hein Vanhaezebrouck	(France) Karim Belhocine	Nike	Digipass by VASCO
Lierse S.K.	(Egypt) Maged Samy	(Norway) Trond Sollied	(Belgium) Jurgen Cavens	Jako	Wadi Degla
K.S.C. Lokeren Oost-Vlaanderen	(Belgium) Roger Lambrecht	(Belgium) Peter Maes	(Belgium) Killian Overmeire	Masita	Q-Team VP Lambrecht
KV Mechelen	(Belgium) Johan Timmermans	(Belgium) Marc Brys	(Belgium) Julien Gorius	Joma	Telenet
K. Sint-Truidense V.V.	(Belgium) Roland Duchâtelet	(Belgium) Guido Brepoels	(Belgium) Peter Delorge	Lotto	Belisol
Standard Liège	(Switzerland) Reto Stiffler	(Belgium) Dominique D'Onofrio	(Belgium) Steven Defour	Planete Rouge	e-lotto.be
K.V.C. Westerlo	(Belgium) Herman Wijnants	(Belgium) Jan Ceulemans	(Belgium) Jef Delen	Saller	Willy Naessens
S.V. Zulte-Waregem	(Belgium) Willy Naessens	(Belgium) Hugo Broos	(Belgium) Ludwin Van Nieuwenhuyze	Patrick	Enfinity, Petrus

=== Managerial changes ===
==== During summer break ====
Team	Outgoing manager	Manner of departure	Date of vacancy	Replaced by	Date of appointment
Charleroi	(Scotland) Tommy Craig	Sacked	14 April 2010	(Belgium) Jacky Mathijssen	4 June 2010
Lokeren	(Belgium) Emilio Ferrera	Contract ended.	26 April 2010	(Belgium) Peter Maes	20 May 2010
Germinal Beerschot	(Belgium) Jos Daerden	Contract ended.	End of 2009–10 season	(Belgium) Glen De Boeck	21 May 2010
Kortrijk	(Belgium) Georges Leekens	Signed as head coach of the Belgium national football team.	5 May 2010	(Belgium) Hein Vanhaezebrouck	6 June 2010
Mechelen	(Belgium) Peter Maes	Signed for Lokeren.	20 May 2010	(Belgium) Marc Brys	27 May 2010
Cercle Brugge	(Belgium) Glen De Boeck	Signed for Germinal Beerschot.	21 May 2010	(Belgium) Bob Peeters	26 May 2010
Gent	(Belgium) Michel Preud'homme	Signed for (Netherlands) Twente.	23 May 2010	(Belgium) Francky Dury	10 June 2010
Zulte-Waregem	(Belgium) Francky Dury	Signed for Gent.	10 June 2010	(Belgium) Bart De Roover	11 June 2010

==== During regular season ====
Team	Outgoing manager	Manner of departure	Date of vacancy	Replaced by	Date of appointment	Position in table
Eupen	(Belgium) Danny Ost	Resigned	4 September 2010	(Italy) Ezio Capuano	7 September 2010	16th
Lierse	(Belgium) Aimé Anthuenis	Sacked	19 September 2010	(Belgium) Eric Van Meir	19 September 2010	15th
Charleroi	(Belgium) Jacky Mathijssen	Sacked	20 September 2010	(Hungary) Csaba László	23 September 2010	14th
Eupen	(Italy) Ezio Capuano	Resigned	24 September 2010	(France) Albert Cartier	24 September 2010	16th
Zulte-Waregem	(Belgium) Bart De Roover	Sacked	24 October 2010	(Belgium) Hugo Broos	27 October 2010	12th
Germinal Beerschot	(Belgium) Glen De Boeck	Sacked	29 November 2010	(Belgium) Jacky Mathijssen	2 December 2010	13th
Lierse	(Belgium) Eric Van Meir	Caretaker replaced	30 December 2010	(Norway) Trond Sollied	1 January 2011	15th
Charleroi	(Hungary) Csaba László	Sacked	17 March 2011	(Hungary) Tibor Balogh	17 March 2011	16th

==== During playoffs ====
Team	Outgoing manager	Manner of departure	Date of vacancy	Replaced by	Date of appointment	Position in table
Charleroi	(Hungary) Tibor Balogh	Caretaker replaced	24 March 2011	(Hungary) Zoltan Kovács	24 March 2011	2nd in Relegation Playoff
Charleroi	(Hungary) Zoltan Kovács	Sacked	4 April 2011	(Croatia) Luka Peruzović	4 April 2011	2nd in Relegation Playoff
Eupen	(France) Albert Cartier	Sacked	13 April 2011	(Belgium) Danny Ost	13 April 2011	1st in Relegation Playoff

== Regular season ==
=== League table ===
Pos	Team	Pld	W	D	L	GF	GA	GD	Pts	Qualification
1	Anderlecht	30	19	8	3	58	20	+38	65	Qualification to Championship play-offs
2	Genk (C, O)	30	19	7	4	64	27	+37	64	Qualification to Championship play-offs
3	Gent	30	17	6	7	59	42	+17	57	Qualification to Championship play-offs
4	Club Brugge	30	16	5	9	60	35	+25	53	Qualification to Championship play-offs
5	Lokeren	30	13	11	6	43	36	+7	50	Qualification to Championship play-offs
6	Standard Liège	30	15	4	11	50	38	+12	49	Qualification to Championship play-offs
7	Mechelen	30	13	9	8	34	30	+4	48	Qualification to Europa League play-offs
8	Westerlo (O)	30	11	8	11	41	40	+1	41	Qualification to Europa League play-offs
9	Cercle Brugge	30	11	6	13	33	34	−1	39	Qualification to Europa League play-offs
10	Kortrijk	30	11	5	14	36	39	−3	38	Qualification to Europa League play-offs
11	Zulte Waregem	30	7	12	11	39	41	−2	33	Qualification to Europa League play-offs
12	Sint-Truiden	30	8	5	17	20	51	−31	29	Qualification to Europa League play-offs
13	Germinal Beerschot	30	5	11	14	24	40	−16	26	Qualification to Europa League play-offs
14	Lierse	30	4	12	14	26	58	−32	24	Qualification to Europa League play-offs
15	Eupen	30	5	8	17	28	50	−22	23	Qualification to the Relegation play-offs
16	Charleroi	30	4	7	19	20	54	−34	19	Qualification to the Relegation play-offs

Source: soccerway.com
Rules for classification: 1) points; 2) number of matches won; if teams are still tied a playoff is organised.
(C) Champions; (O) Play-off winners

=== Positions by round ===
Note: The classification was made after the weekend (or midweek) of each matchday, so postponed matches were only processed at the time they were played to represent the real evolution in standings. The postponed matches are:

- Matchday 15: Eupen vs. Mechelen of 13 November because of a flooded pitch, to be played on 18 January between matchdays 22 and 23.
- Matchday 17: Kortrijk vs. Lokeren of 27 November because of excessive rainfall and snow, to be played on 18 January between matchdays 22 and 23.
- Matchday 18: Charleroi vs. Cercle Brugge and Lierse vs. Mechelen of 4 December because of snow. The match Lierse vs. Mechelen is to be played on 15 February between matchdays 27 and 28, whereas on 21 December (between matchdays 20 and 21) the match Charleroi vs. Cercle Brugge has been awarded a 0–5 victory to Cercle Brugge as Charleroi did not "try everything possible to allow the match to be played". On 17 March, just two days before the final matchday, the decision is reversed as Charleroi had submitted a complaint at the BAS. BAS stands for the Belgian court of Arbitration of Sport, which is the Belgian version of the Court of Arbitration for Sport. As a result of this decision, Charleroi regained a chance of avoiding the relegation playoff, as they were only five points behind the 14th place, with two matches to play. Later that day, the decision is made to play the match on 23 March, which is unconventional as this meant that not all teams will play their final match on the same time.
- Matchday 20: Lokeren vs. Cercle Brugge and Sint-Truiden vs. Mechelen of 18 December were cancelled because of too many icy patches and/or snow on the pitch. The match between Lokeren and Cercle Brugge was rescheduled to be played on 2 February, between matchdays 24 and 25. On 28 December (between matchdays 21 and 22) Mechelen was awarded a 0–5 victory as Sint-Truiden did not provide proper playing conditions, however Sint-Truiden pressed charges for unfair treatment. The club was proven right in court and as a result the forfait became undone on 25 January (between matchdays 23 and 24) and the match was replayed on 23 February (between matchdays 27 and 28). The match Germinal Beerschot – Gent of 19 December was stopped after 10 minutes at a score of 0–0 because of excessive snowfall, it will be replayed on 16 February, between matchdays 26 and 27.
- Matchday 21: With the whole of Belgium suffering from excessive snow, several matches were cancelled, mostly because it was too dangerous to send thousands of supporters out on the slippery roads. Eupen vs. Zulte-Waregem, Charleroi vs. Germinal Beerschot, Westerlo vs. Lokeren and Mechelen vs. Kortrijk of 26 December were thus cancelled. The derby between Genk and Sint-Truiden of the 27th was also postponed. All of these matches were rescheduled to be played on 2 February, between matchdays 24 and 25, except Westerlo vs. Lokeren which was rescheduled to 16 February, between matchdays 26 and 27.
- Matchday 22: With a lot of roads still slippery in the south and east of Belgium, two more matches are cancelled: Standard vs. Mechelen of 29 December and Sint-Truiden vs. Cercle Brugge of 30 December. Both matches have been rescheduled to be played between matchdays 27 and 28, on 26 and 27 February respectively.

Team ╲ Round	1	2	3	4	5	6	7	8	9	10	11	12	13	14	15	16	17	18	19	20	21	22	23	24	25	26	27	28	29	30
Anderlecht	1	4	3	3	4	2	2	2	2	2	3	2	2	3	2	2	1	1	2	1	1	1	1	1	1	1	2	2	1	1
Genk	3	1	1	1	1	1	1	1	1	1	1	1	1	1	1	1	2	2	1	2	2	2	2	2	2	2	1	1	2	2
Gent	4	9	5	5	3	5	4	4	3	4	2	4	3	2	3	3	3	3	3	3	3	3	3	3	3	3	3	3	3	3
Club Brugge	12	6	9	11	9	7	7	6	6	6	5	8	8	9	7	8	8	6	6	6	4	4	4	4	4	4	4	4	4	4
Lokeren	15	14	12	12	13	10	13	11	9	9	8	7	7	7	5	4	5	4	5	5	6	5	6	7	6	6	5	5	5	5
Standard Liège	7	3	6	8	6	6	6	5	4	3	4	3	4	5	4	5	4	5	4	4	5	6	7	5	5	7	7	7	6	6
Mechelen	2	2	2	2	2	4	3	3	5	5	7	5	5	4	6	6	6	7	8	9	10	9	8	9	7	5	6	6	7	7
Westerlo	12	7	8	9	11	12	9	8	10	10	10	10	10	10	9	10	10	10	10	11	11	11	10	10	10	10	10	10	8	8
Cercle Brugge	7	10	7	10	10	11	8	10	8	8	6	6	6	8	10	7	7	8	9	10	7	7	5	6	8	8	8	8	9	9
Kortrijk	4	5	4	4	5	3	5	7	7	7	9	9	9	6	8	9	9	9	7	7	8	8	9	8	9	9	9	9	10	10
Zulte Waregem	7	12	11	7	8	9	12	9	12	12	12	12	12	11	11	11	11	11	11	8	9	10	11	11	11	11	11	11	11	11
Sint-Truiden	4	8	10	6	7	8	11	13	13	13	13	13	13	13	13	12	12	12	12	12	12	12	12	12	12	12	13	12	12	12
Germinal Beerschot	11	13	14	13	14	13	10	12	11	11	11	11	11	12	12	13	13	13	13	14	14	14	13	14	13	13	12	13	13	13
Lierse	12	15	16	15	15	15	15	15	14	15	14	14	14	14	14	15	15	15	15	15	15	15	15	15	15	15	15	15	15	14
Eupen	16	15	15	16	16	16	16	16	16	16	16	16	16	15	15	14	14	14	14	13	13	13	14	13	14	14	14	14	14	15
Charleroi	7	10	13	14	12	14	14	14	15	14	15	15	15	16	16	16	16	16	16	16	16	16	16	16	16	16	16	16	16	16

Source: soccerassociation.com

=== Results ===
Home \ Away	AND	CER	CHA	BRU	EUP	GNK	GNT	GBA	KVK	LIE	LOK	KVM	STV	STA	WES	ZWA
Anderlecht		1–0	4–1	2–2	4–1	1–1	3–2	4–0	3–0	6–0	0–0	5–0	2–0	2–0	2–0	0–0
Cercle Brugge	1–0		1–1	3–1	2–1	0–1	0–1	1–1	2–1	3–0	1–1	0–1	4–2	1–0	0–1	1–3
Charleroi	0–0	0–3 (Note: Match originally awarded to Cercle Brugge as a 0–5 victory, as Charleroi did not provide proper playing conditions. Later this decision was undone after appeal from Charleroi.)		0–5	2–0	1–3	1–3	2–0	0–0	0–1	1–2	0–0	1–0	0–2	0–1	2–0
Club Brugge	0–2	0–1	5–0		4–0	2–2	3–2	1–0	4–1	2–0	2–1	1–2	4–1	2–2	4–3	2–0
Eupen	1–1	0–0	1–0	1–4		1–4	0–3	0–1	3–1	2–2	0–1	0–1	6–0	0–1	0–1	0–2
Genk	1–2	3–0	5–0	1–0	5–1		1–2	2–1	3–2	4–1	3–1	1–0	1–1	4–2	0–2	3–0
Gent	1–2	1–0	2–1	0–2	2–1	0–4		1–0	2–0	4–1	2–1	3–1	2–0	4–1	4–4	5–3
Germinal Beerschot	0–1	0–0	1–0	2–1	0–0	0–1	2–2		3–1	1–1	1–1	1–1	0–0	0–1	0–0	3–0
Kortrijk	0–2	2–1	3–0	1–0	3–1	1–0	0–1	4–0		3–1	0–0	1–0	2–0	2–1	1–2	2–2
Lierse	1–1	0–1	1–0	0–0	1–1	1–1	2–2	2–2	1–2		2–2	2–1	1–2	1–4	2–1	0–0
Lokeren	0–3	2–1	1–1	1–0	0–2	2–2	3–2	1–0	1–1	1–1		3–1	3–0	2–1	3–1	2–1
Mechelen	0–0	2–2	2–0	0–1	2–0	2–2	1–1	5–1	1–0	1–0	2–0		0–0	1–0	3–1	0–0
Sint-Truiden	0–2	0–3	3–2	2–1	1–1	0–2	1–1	1–0	1–0	1–0	0–2	0–1		1–0	1–2	0–3
Standard Liège	5–1	2–0	2–1	2–2	1–3	0–2	2–1	1–0	1–0	7–0	3–3	3–0	1–0		2–1	1–1
Westerlo	2–0	2–1	2–2	1–2	1–1	1–1	0–1	1–1	2–1	2–0	1–2	1–1	3–0	1–2		1–1
Zulte Waregem	1–2	4–0	1–1	2–3	0–0	0–1	2–2	4–3	1–1	1–1	1–1	1–2	1–2	2–0	2–0	

Source: Soccerway
Legend: Blue = home team win; Yellow = draw; Red = away team win.

== Championship playoff ==
The points obtained during the regular season will be halved (and rounded up) before the start of the playoff. As a result, the teams started with the following points before the playoff: Anderlecht 33 points, Genk 32, Gent 29, Club Brugge 27, Lokeren 25 and Standard 25.5. In the event of ties at the end of the playoffs, the half point was deducted if it had been added. Anderlecht, Gent, Club Brugge and Standard received this type of bonus due to rounding.

=== Playoff table ===
Pos	Team	Pld	W	D	L	GF	GA	GD	Pts	Qualification
1	Genk (C)	10	6	1	3	16	12	+4	51	Qualification to Champions League third qualifying round
2	Standard Liège	10	8	2	0	18	6	+12	50.5	Qualification to Champions League third qualifying round
3	Anderlecht	10	3	2	5	14	16	−2	44	Qualification to Europa League play-off round
4	Club Brugge	10	4	4	2	13	6	+7	43	Qualification to Europa League third qualifying round
5	Gent	10	0	4	6	9	22	−13	33	
6	Lokeren	10	1	3	6	9	17	−8	31	

Rules for classification: 1) points; 2) points after deduction of (possible) half points added due to rounding; 3) number of wins; 4) goal difference; 5) number of goals scored; 6) number of away goals scored; 7) number of away wins.
(C) Champions

=== Positions by round ===
Below the positions per round are shown. As teams did not all start with an equal number of points, the initial pre-playoffs positions are also given.

Team ╲ Round	Initial	1	2	3	4	5	6	7	8	9	10
Genk	2	1	1	2	1	1	1	1	1	1	1
Standard Liège	6	4	3	3	2	3	2	2	2	2	2
Anderlecht	1	2	2	1	3	2	3	3	3	3	3
Club Brugge	4	5	4	4	4	4	4	4	4	4	4
Gent	3	3	5	5	5	5	5	5	5	5	5
Lokeren	5	6	6	6	6	6	6	6	6	6	6

Source: soccerassociation.com

=== Results ===
Home \ Away	AND	BRU	GNK	GNT	LOK	STA
Anderlecht		0–0	2–0	4–1	3–4	1–3
Club Brugge	3–0		3–0	3–0	0–0	1–1
Genk	1–0	3–1		3–0	2–1	1–1
Gent	1–1	1–1	2–3		2–2	1–3
Lokeren	1–2	0–1	0–2	1–1		0–1
Standard Liège	2–1	1–0	2–1	1–0	3–0	

Legend: Blue = home team win; Yellow = draw; Red = away team win.

== Europa League Playoff ==
Mechelen, Westerlo, Cercle Brugge, Kortrijk, Zulte-Waregem, Sint-Truiden, Germinal Beerschot and Lierse qualified for the Europa League Playoffs.

=== Group A ===
Pos	Team	Pld	W	D	L	GF	GA	GD	Pts	Qualification	CER	LIE	KVM	STR
1	Cercle Brugge (A)	6	2	3	1	5	5	0	9	Playoff Final		0–0	3–1	1–0
2	Lierse	6	2	2	2	10	8	+2	8		3–0		1–2	1–1
3	Mechelen	6	2	2	2	9	10	−1	8		0–0	4–3		1–1
4	Sint-Truiden	6	1	3	2	6	7	−1	6		1–1	1–2	2–1	

Legend: Blue = home team win; Yellow = draw; Red = away team win.
(A) Advanced to the Final

=== Group B ===
Pos	Team	Pld	W	D	L	GF	GA	GD	Pts	Qualification	WES	ZWA	GBA	KVK
1	Westerlo (A)	6	3	3	0	16	6	+10	12	Playoff Final		7–1	1–0	3–0
2	Zulte-Waregem	6	3	1	2	6	10	−4	10		1–1		1–0	2–0
3	Germinal Beerschot	6	1	3	2	6	6	0	6		3–3	2–0		0–0
4	Kortrijk	6	0	3	3	2	8	−6	3		1–1	0–1	1–1	

Legend: Blue = home team win; Yellow = draw; Red = away team win.
(A) Advanced to the Final

=== Europa League playoff final ===
The winners of both playoff groups competed in a two-legged match. The winners on aggregate than will compete in another match (called Testmatch) against a team from the championship playoff (see below). If both teams are tied after two matches, the away goals rule will be applied. Should both teams still be tied afterwards, thirty minutes of extra time will be played and, if necessary, a penalty shootout will be conducted.

13 May 2011
20:30 CEST

Westerlo	3–0	Cercle Brugge
Henrique 4', 55'; Ngolok 64'	Report

Het Kuipje, Westerlo
Referee: Luc Wouters

16 May 2011
20:30 CEST

Cercle Brugge	2–2	Westerlo
D'Haene 59'; Iachtchouk 68'		Chávez 33'; Annab 90'

Jan Breydel Stadium, Bruges

Westerlo won 5–2 on aggregate.

=== Testmatches Europa League ===
The fourth-placed team from the championship playoff and the winners of the Europa League playoff would have competed for one spot in the third qualifying round of the 2011–12 UEFA Europa League.

Before the match, both teams were already sure of qualification for European football. Westerlo because their opponent in the final of the 2010–11 Belgian Cup was Standard Liège, who were already qualified for the 2011–12 UEFA Champions League. Club Brugge because of their league position (4th). As a result, both teams agreed to drop the testmatches regardless of the result of the Belgian Cup final:

- Because Standard won the Belgian cup, Anderlecht will enter the Play-off round and Westerlo agreed to start in the Second qualifying round, giving Club Brugge the ticket to the Third qualifying round.

== Relegation playoff ==
The teams finishing in the last two positions play each other 5 times. The team ending in 15th position starts with a three-point bonus and has three home matches.

Pos	Team	Pld	W	D	L	GF	GA	GD	Pts	Qualification or relegation
1	Eupen (R)	4	2	1	1	9	8	+1	10	Belgian Second Division final round
2	Charleroi (R)	4	1	1	2	8	9	−1	4	Relegation to 2011–12 Belgian Second Division

Rules for classification: 1) points; 2) head-to-head points; 3) head-to-head goal difference; 4) head-to-head goals scored; 5) goal difference; 6) number of goals scored.
(R) Relegated

Home \ Away	CHA	EUP	CHA	EUP	CHA	EUP
Charleroi		2–0		2–2		– (Note: Match not played as Charleroi could no longer overtake Eupen in the standings.)
Eupen	3–2		4–2		–	

Legend: Blue = home team win; Yellow = draw; Red = away team win.

== Top goalscorers ==
In contrary to the previous season, which was the inaugural season with playoffs, the goals scored during the playoffs are valid to determine the league top scorer. As a result, Jelle Vossen, who was leading at the end of the regular season with 17 goals, still missed out on the top scorers' trophy.

Source: sporza.be and Sport.be (in Dutch)

Rank	Player	Club	Goals
1	(Croatia) Ivan Perišić	Club Brugge	22
2	(Belgium) Jelle Vossen	Genk	20
3	(Brazil) Paulo Henrique	Westerlo	18
4	(Belgium) Romelu Lukaku	Anderlecht	16
5	(Belgium) Marvin Ogunjimi	Genk	15
5	(Venezuela) Ronald Vargas	Club Brugge	15
7	(Israel) Elyaniv Barda	Genk	14
8	(Morocco) Mehdi Carcela	Standard Liège	13
8	(France) Julien Gorius	Mechelen	13
10	(Central African Republic) Habib Habibou	Zulte Waregem	12

== Awards ==
=== Individual awards ===
Award	Player	Club
Belgian Professional Footballer of the Year	(Croatia) Ivan Perišić	Club Brugge
Belgian Goalkeeper of the Year	(Belgium) Thibaut Courtois	Genk
Belgian Coach of the Year	(Belgium) Franky Vercauteren	Genk
Belgian Referee of the Year	(Belgium) Frank De Bleeckere	

Team of the Season
Goalkeeper	(Belgium) Thibaut Courtois (Genk)			
Defenders	(Belgium) Carl Hoefkens (Club Brugge)	(France) Eliaquim Mangala (Standard Liège)	(Belgium) Laurent Ciman (Standard Liège)	(Belgium) Jelle Van Damme (Standard Liège)
Midfielders	(Belgium) Kevin De Bruyne (Genk)	(Morocco) Mbark Boussoufa (Anderlecht)	(Belgium) Axel Witsel (Standard Liège)	(Belgium) Vadis Odjidja-Ofoe (Club Brugge)
Forwards	(Croatia) Ivan Perišić (Club Brugge)		(Belgium) Jelle Vossen (Genk)	

== Season statistics ==
=== Scoring ===
- Fastest goal in a match: 19 seconds – (Belgium) Marvin Ogunjimi for Genk against Standard Liège (18 October 2010)
- Goal scored at the latest point in a match: 90+6 minutes – (Belgium) Axel Witsel for Standard Liège against Kortrijk (17 December 2010).
- Winning goal scored at the latest point in a match: 90+5 minutes – (Bosnia and Herzegovina) Adnan Čustović for Germinal Beerschot against Charleroi (11 September 2010).
- Widest winning margin: 7 goals
  - Standard Liège 7–0 Lierse (27 November 2010).
- Most goals in a match by one team: 7 goals
  - Standard Liège 7–0 Lierse (27 November 2010).
  - Westerlo 7–1 Zulte Waregem (7 May 2011).
- Most goals in one half: 6 goals
  - Gent 4–4 Westerlo (2–0 at half-time) (20 November 2010).
  - Club Brugge 4–3 Westerlo (3–3 at half-time) (5 December 2010).
- Most goals in one half by a single team: 4 goals
  - Anderlecht 4–1 Eupen (0–1 at half-time) (31 July 2010).
  - Club Brugge 4–1 Sint-Truiden (4–1 at half-time) (7 August 2010).
  - Genk 5–0 Charleroi (4–0 at half-time) (15 August 2010).
  - Anderlecht 5–0 Mechelen (1–0 at half-time) (26 September 2010).
  - Standard Liège 5–1 Anderlecht (1–0 at half-time) (3 October 2010).
  - Eupen 6–0 Sint-Truiden (4–0 at half-time) (16 October 2010).
  - Gent 4–4 Westerlo (2–0 at half-time) (20 November 2010).
  - Standard Liège 7–0 Lierse (3–0 at half-time) (27 November 2010).
  - Anderlecht 4–1 Charleroi (0–1 at half-time) (27 November 2010).
  - Genk 5–1 Eupen (1–0 at half-time) (11 December 2010).
  - Anderlecht 6–0 Lierse (2–0 at half-time) (26 December 2010).
  - Eupen 4–2 Charleroi (0–2 at half-time) (16 April 2011).
  - Westerlo 7–1 Zulte Waregem (4–0 at half-time) (7 May 2011).
- Most goals in a match by one player: 4 goals
  - (Croatia) Ivan Perišić for Club Brugge against Charleroi (29 December 2010).

=== Discipline ===
- Card given at latest point in a game: (Kenya) Victor Wanyama (yellow) at 90+9 minutes for Germinal Beerschot against Charleroi (10 September 2010).
- Most yellow cards in a single match: 10 – Standard Liège 3–3 Lokeren: 6 for Standard (Bolat, Pocognoli, Defour, Carcela, Witsel and Grozav), 4 for Lokeren (El Mouataz, Taravel, De Ceulaer and Leko) (14 August 2010)

== Attendances ==
Club	Average	Highest
Standard	25,125	30,000
Club Brugge	23,157	26,681
Anderlecht	22,636	24,000
Genk	20,692	24,296
Mechelen	11,220	12,898
Gent	10,314	12,541
Lierse	10,159	14,000
Germinal Beerschot	8,216	9,423
Cercle Brugge	7,488	11,992
STVV	7,473	10,445
Zulte Waregem	6,963	8,479
Charleroi	6,482	18,038
Lokeren	6,060	8,170
Kortrijk	6,031	9,012
Westerlo	5,132	7,500
Eupen	3,606	7,500

== See also ==
- List of Belgian football transfers summer 2010
