= 2012–13 ES Sétif season =

ES Sétif
2012–13 season
- Chairman: Hassan Hammar
- Head coach: Hubert Velud (from 4 July 2012)
- Stadium: Stade 8 Mai 1945
- Ligue 1: Winners
- Algerian Cup: Semi-final
- CAF Confederation Cup: Group stage
- CAF Champions League: Second round
- Top goalscorer: League: Mohamed Amine Aoudia (12); All: Mohamed Amine Aoudia (17)
Home colours	Away colours	Third colours

In the 2012–13 season, ES Sétif competed in the Ligue 1 for the 43rd season, as well as the Algerian Cup. It was their 15th consecutive season in the top flight of Algerian football. They competed in Ligue 1, the CAF Champions League and Algerian Cup.

== Squad list ==
Players and squad numbers last updated on 18 November 2010.
Note: Flags indicate national team as has been defined under FIFA eligibility rules. Players may hold more than one non-FIFA nationality.

No.	Nat.	Position	Name	Date of birth (age)	Signed from
Goalkeepers
Defenders
Midfielders
Forwards

== Competitions ==
=== Overview ===
Competition	Record								Started round	Final position / round	First match	Last match
Competition	G	W	D	L	GF	GA	GD	Win %	Started round	Final position / round	First match	Last match
Ligue 1	30	18	5	7	55	27	+28	60.00	—N/a	Winners	15 September 2012	21 May 2013
Algerian Cup	5	4	0	1	12	7	+5	80.00	Round of 64	Semi-final	14 December 2012	12 April 2013
Champions League	4	2	0	2	9	8	+1	50.00	First round	Second round	16 March 2013	3 May 2013
Confederation Cup	2	1	0	1	2	2	+0	50.00	Play-off round		17 May 2013	1 June 2013
Total	41	25	5	11	78	44	+34	60.98				

Updated to match played 9 May 2017
Source: Competitions

== League table ==
Pos	Team	Pld	W	D	L	GF	GA	GD	Pts	Qualification or relegation
1	ES Sétif (C)	30	18	5	7	55	27	+28	59	Qualification for the Champions League preliminary round
2	USM El Harrach (Note: USM El Harrach, the 2012–13 Algerian Ligue Professionnelle 1 runner-up, withdrew after the draw was held. Sporting Praia Cruz, the 2013 São Tomé and Príncipe Championship champion, were allowed by the CAF to replace them in the draw.)	30	17	6	7	38	22	+16	57	Qualification for the Champions League preliminary round
3	CS Constantine	30	13	13	4	37	20	+17	52	Qualification for the Confederation Cup preliminary round
4	USM Alger (Note: USM Alger, the 2012–13 Algerian Cup winner, withdrew before the start of the competition.)	30	15	6	9	32	15	+17	51	Qualification for the Confederation Cup preliminary round
5	MC Alger (Note: In a match between USM El Harrach and MC Alger the last refused to play in the Stade 1er Novembre 1954, but the LFP refused to change the pitch, Despite the presence of USM El Harrach, the referees and supporters, but the Mouloudia team did not attend. the club will receive a penalty, according to Article 84 of the Disciplinary Code of the Algerian Football Federation (FAF), "a match lost by penalty. Defalcation of three (03) points, One million dinars (1,000,000 dinars) fine for the club. "The offending club will be deprived of its compensation due for television rights.)	30	15	8	7	33	24	+9	50	

Updated to match(es) played on 21 May 2013. Source: DZFoot
Rules for classification: 1) points; 2) head-to-head points; 3) head-to-head goal difference; 4) goal difference; 5) total goals; 6) fairplay ranking; 7) playoff.
(C) Champions

=== Results summary ===
Overall								Home						Away					
Pld	W	D	L	GF	GA	GD	Pts	W	D	L	GF	GA	GD	W	D	L	GF	GA	GD
30	18	5	7	55	27	+28	59	14	0	1	40	10	+30	4	5	6	15	17	−2

Last updated: 29 December 2014.
Source: Competitive matches

=== Results by round ===
Round	1	2	3	4	5	6	7	8	9	10	11	12	13	14	15	16	17	18	19	20	21	22	23	24	25	26	27	28	29	30
Ground	A	H	A	H	A	H	A	H	A	H	A	H	A	H	A	H	A	H	A	H	A	H	A	H	A	H	A	H	A	H
Result	D	W	D	W	L	W	W	W	W	W	L	W	D	W	D	W	W	W	W	W	L	W	L	W	L	W	L	W	D	L
Position	9	4	4	2	5	3	2	1	1	1	1	1	1	1	1	1	1	1	1	1	1	1	1	1	1	1	1	1	1	1

Source: Competitive matches
A = Away; H = Home; W = Win; D = Draw; L = Loss

=== Matches ===
15 September 2012 Round 1	MC El Eulma	1–1	ES Sétif	El Eulma
17:45	Gharbi 90+4'	Report	47' Delhoum	Stadium: Stade Messaoud Zougar; Referee: Farouk Mial

18 September 2012 Round 2	ES Sétif	6–0	CA Batna	Sétif
18:00	Aoudia 20', 57'; Ziti 28'; El Okbi 30'; Gourmi 62'; Tiouli 71'	Report		Stadium: Stade 8 Mai 1945; Referee: Mokhtar Amalou

22 September 2012 Round 3	USM El Harrach	0–0	ES Sétif	Algiers
16:00		Report		Stadium: Stade 1er Novembre 1954; Referee: Mohamed Bichari

29 September 2012 Round 4	ES Sétif	3–1	WA Tlemcen	Sétif
18:00	Chalali 38'; Aoudia 49', 73'	Report	84' Boudjakdji	Stadium: Stade 8 Mai 1945; Referee: Amine Sekhraoui

6 October 2012 Round 5	JS Saoura	1–0	ES Sétif	Béchar
16:00	Oughliss 61'	Report		Stadium: Stade 20 Août 1955; Referee: Mohamed Ghorbal

16 October 2012 Round 6	ES Sétif	1–0	USM Alger	Sétif
18:00	Karaoui 73'	Report		Stadium: Stade 8 Mai 1945; Referee: Mehdi Abid Charef

20 October 2012 Round 7	MC Oran	0–2	ES Sétif	Oran
18:00		Report	24' Djahnit; 90' Soltani	Stadium: Ahmed Zabana Stadium; Referee: Farouk Houasnia

23 October 2012 Round 8	ES Sétif	1–0	JSM Béjaïa	Sétif
17:45	Aoudia 86'	Report		Stadium: Stade 8 Mai 1945; Referee: Mokhtar Amalou

3 November 2012 Round 9	USM Bel-Abbès	0–2	ES Sétif	Sidi Bel Abbès
15:00		Report	68', 84' Chalali	Stadium: Stade 24 Fevrier 1956; Referee: Redouane Necib

10 November 2012 Round 10	ES Sétif	1–0	CR Belouizdad	Sétif
17:45	Djahnit 53'	Report		Stadium: Stade 8 Mai 1945; Referee: Djamel Haimoudi

17 November 2012 Round 11	ASO Chlef	2–1	ES Sétif	Chlef
17:45	Ghazali 9'; Mellouli 79'	Report	75' Aoudia	Stadium: Stade Mohamed Boumezrag; Referee: Farouk Mial

24 November 2012 Round 12	ES Sétif	3–1	MC Alger	Sétif
18:00	Djahnit 14'; Aoudia 18'; Ziti 85'	Report	16' Ghazi	Stadium: Stade 8 Mai 1945; Referee: Sofiane Bousseter

1 December 2012 Round 13	JS Kabylie	1–1	ES Sétif	Tizi Ouzou
18:00	Hanifi 89'	Report	68' Djahnit	Stadium: Stade du 1er Novembre 1954; Referee: Redouane Necib

8 December 2012 Round 14	ES Sétif	3–1	CA Bordj Bou Arréridj	Sétif
17:45	Benabderahmane 27'; Karaoui 35'; Aoudia 76' (pen.)	Report	40' Djarrar	Stadium: Stade 8 Mai 1945; Referee: Mehdi Abid Charef

21 December 2012 Round 15	CS Constantine	0–0	ES Sétif	Constantine
15:00		Report		Stadium: Stade Mohamed Hamlaoui; Referee: Merzak Halalchi

15 January 2013 Round 16	ES Sétif	3–1	MC El Eulma	Sétif
18:00	Delhoum 33'; Nadji 52', 60'	Report	38' Derrardja	Stadium: Stade 8 Mai 1945; Referee: Mokhtar Amalou

19 January 2013 Round 17	CA Batna	1–2	ES Sétif	Batna
15:00	Merazka 79'	Report	11' Tiouli; 15' Madouni	Stadium: November 1, 1954 Stadium; Referee: Youssef Zerrouki

25 January 2013 Round 18	ES Sétif	1–0	USM El Harrach	Sétif
16:00	Delhoum 90+3'	Report		Stadium: Stade 8 Mai 1945; Referee: Farouk Mial

1 February 2013 Round 19	WA Tlemcen	1–2	ES Sétif	Tlemcen
15:00	Belgherri 84' (pen.)	Report	56' Madouni; 73' (o.g.) Zouak	Stadium: Stade Akid Lotfi; Referee: Mohamed Bichari

9 February 2013 Round 20	ES Sétif	1–0	JS Saoura	Sétif
18:00	Nadji 90+2'	Report		Stadium: Stade 8 Mai 1945; Referee: Abderrezzak Arab

19 February 2013 Round 21	USM Alger	1–0	ES Sétif	Algiers
18:00	Ziaya 6' (pen.)	Report		Stadium: Stade Omar Hamadi; Referee: Mehdi Abid Charef

23 February 2013 Round 22	ES Sétif	4–1	MC Oran	Sétif
18:00	Madouni 26'; Delhoum 30'; Lakhdari 74'; Nadji 79'	Report	17' Chérif	Stadium: Stade 8 Mai 1945; Referee: Mokhtar Amalou

8 March 2013 Round 23	JSM Béjaïa	2–1	ES Sétif	Béjaïa
17:45	Mebarki 21', 71'	Report	59' Nadji	Stadium: Stade de l'Unité Maghrébine; Referee: Merzak Halalchi

12 March 2013 Round 24	ES Sétif	4–0	USM Bel-Abbès	Sétif
18:00	Madouni 31'; Aoudia 35', 45+2'; Nadji 44'	Report		Stadium: Stade 8 Mai 1945; Referee: Mohamed Bichari

16 April 2013 Round 25	CR Belouizdad	4–1	ES Sétif	Belouizdad
18:00	Benchadi 18' (o.g.); Rebih 43', 55'; Dahar 90+4'	Report	28' (pen.) El Okbi	Stadium: Stade 20 Août 1955; Referee: Mohamed Ghorbal

27 April 2013 Round 26	ES Sétif	4–1	ASO Chlef	Sétif
18:00	Ferrahi 11'; Madouni 39'; Aoudia 63' (pen.); Nadji 90+1'	Report	90+3' Aouamri	Stadium: Stade 8 Mai 1945; Referee: Farouk Mial

7 May 2013 Round 27	MC Alger	3–2	ES Sétif	Algiers
17:00	Djallit 1'; Aksas 37'; Bouguèche 80'	Report	31' Delhoum; 43' Mechac	Stadium: Stade 5 Juillet 1962; Referee: Farouk Houasnia

11 May 2013 Round 28	ES Sétif	4–1	JS Kabylie	Sétif
17:00	El Okbi 12', 78'; Benlamri 33' (o.g.); Djahnit 59'	Report	33' Messadia	Stadium: Stade 8 Mai 1945; Referee: Merzak Halalchi

14 May 2013 Round 29	CA Bordj Bou Arréridj	0–0	ES Sétif	Bordj Bou Arréridj
17:00		Report		Stadium: Stade 20 Août 1955; Referee: Djamel Haimoudi

21 May 2013 Round 30	ES Sétif	1–3	CS Constantine	Sétif
17:00	Aoudia 45+2'	Report	13', 60' Belakhdar; 63' Bezzaz	Stadium: Stade 8 Mai 1945; Referee: Amine Sekhraoui

== Algerian Cup ==
14 December 2012 Round of 64	Paradou AC	2–3	ES Sétif	Algiers
15:00	Nekkach 12'; Baleh 87'		16' Benchadi; 18' Madouni; 41' Karaoui	Stadium: Stade Omar Hamadi; Referee: Benmansour

28 December 2012 Round of 32	ES Sétif	2–1	NRB Tougourt	Sétif
15:00	Tiouli 45'; Djahnit 79'		38' (pen.) Kadri	Stadium: Stade 8 Mai 1945; Attendance: 0 (close doors); Referee: Boussaadia

2 March 2013 Round of 16	JSM Chéraga	0–3	ES Sétif	Algiers
14:00			51' Madouni; 63' Delhoum; 86' Benchadi	Stadium: Stade Omar Hamadi; Referee: Mohamed Saïdi

30 March 2013 Quarter-final	ES Sétif	2–1	CR Belouizdad	Sétif
17:45	Aoudia 40'; Madouni 80'		63' Slimani	Stadium: Stade 8 Mai 1945; Referee: Redouane Necib

12 April 2013 Semi-final	MC Alger	3–2	ES Sétif	Algiers
17:00	Bouguèche 7'; Djallit 21' (pen.); Besseghir 31'		15' Nadji; 76' Djahnit	Stadium: Stade 5 Juillet 1962; Referee: Mehdi Abid Charef

== Champions League ==
=== First round ===
16 March 2013	ASFA Yennenga (Burkina Faso)	2–1	(Algeria) ES Sétif	Ouagadougou
16:00 UTC±0	Ouédraogo 71'; Sango 81'		Aoudia 3'	Stadium: Stade du 4-Août; Referee: Yakhouba Keita (Guinea)

5 April 2013	ES Sétif (Algeria)	4–2	(Burkina Faso) ASFA Yennenga	Sétif
18:00 UTC+1	Aoudia 25'; Madouni 40', 60'; Gourmi 51'		Kaboré 89'; Yaméogo 90'	Stadium: Stade 8 Mai 1945; Referee: Ali Lemghaifry (Mauritania)

=== Second round ===
21 April 2013	AC Léopards (Republic of the Congo)	3–1	(Algeria) ES Sétif	Dolisie
15:30 UTC+1	Bhebey Ndey 36'; Dramé 45'; Kalema 90' (pen.)		Aoudia 68'	Stadium: Stade Denis Sassou Nguesso; Referee: Adam Cordier (Chad)

3 May 2013	ES Sétif (Algeria)	3–1 (4–5 p)	(Republic of the Congo) AC Léopards	Sétif
18:00 UTC+1	Djahnit 21'; Delhoum 39', 90+2'		Bhebey Ndey 14'	Stadium: Stade 8 Mai 1945; Referee: William Agbovi (Ghana)

== Confederation Cup ==
=== Play-off round ===
17 May 2013	ES Sétif (Algeria)	2–0	(Gabon) US Bitam	Sétif
19:00 UTC+1	El Okbi 40'; Aoudia 59'			Stadium: Stade 8 Mai 1945; Referee: Juste Ephrem Zio (Burkina Faso)

1 June 2013	US Bitam (Gabon)	2–0 (3–5 p)	(Algeria) ES Sétif	Bitam
15:00 UTC+1	Djissikadié 38'; Zé Ondo 44'			Stadium: Stade Gaston Peyrille; Referee: Janny Sikazwe (Zambia)

== Squad information ==
=== Playing statistics ===
No.	Pos	Nat	Player	Total		Ligue 1		Algerian Cup		Confederation Cup		Champions League	
No.	Pos	Nat	Player	Apps	Goals	Apps	Goals	Apps	Goals	Apps	Goals	Apps	Goals
Goalkeepers
22	GK	(Algeria) ALG	Nadjib Ghoul	6	0	3	0	3	0	0	0	0	0
1	GK	(Algeria) ALG	Sofiane Khedairia	36	0	27	0	3	0	2	0	4	0
Defenders
25	DF	(Algeria) ALG	Abdelkrim Mammeri	10	0	6	0	0	0	2	0	2	0
3	DF	(Algeria) ALG	Riad Benchadi	17	2	8	0	5	2	1	0	3	0
28	DF	(Algeria) ALG	Farès Benabderahmane	27	1	21	1	3	0	1	0	2	0
20	DF	(Mali) MLI	Demba Barry	5	0	5	0	0	0	0	0	0	0
33	DF	(Algeria) ALG	Mohamed Khoutir Ziti	38	2	28	2	5	0	1	0	4	0
5	DF	(Algeria) ALG	Adel Lakhdari	18	1	12	1	2	0	1	0	3	0
26	DF	(Algeria) ALG	Mohamed Lagraâ	35	0	28	0	2	0	2	0	3	0
	DF	(Algeria) ALG	Said Arroussi	2	0	0	0	1	0	1	0	0	0
Midfielders
7	MF	(Algeria) ALG	Kaled Gourmi	35	2	29	1	2	0	1	0	3	1
8	MF	(Algeria) ALG	Mourad Delhoum	35	8	25	5	5	1	1	0	4	2
6	MF	(Algeria) ALG	Farouk Belkaïd	33	0	26	0	3	0	1	0	3	0
14	MF	(Algeria) ALG	Amir Karaoui	28	3	25	2	2	1	0	0	1	0
10	MF	(Algeria) ALG	Hacène El Okbi	26	5	18	4	4	0	2	1	2	0
36	MF	(Algeria) ALG	Akram Djahnit	34	8	24	5	5	2	2	0	3	1
15	MF	(Algeria) ALG	Mohamed El Amine Tiouli	26	3	18	2	3	1	2	0	3	0
16	MF	(Algeria) ALG	Rachid Ferrahi	31	1	21	1	4	0	2	0	4	0
	MF	(Algeria) ALG	Benamar Mellel	2	0	2	0	0	0	0	0	0	0
	MF	(Algeria) ALG	Ammour	1	0	0	0	1	0	0	0	0	0
	MF	(Algeria) ALG	Lefkir	1	0	0	0	1	0	0	0	0	0
Forwards
13	FW	(Algeria) ALG	Mohamed Amine Aoudia	29	17	20	12	4	1	1	1	4	3
9	FW	(Algeria) ALG	Laïd Madouni	28	10	18	5	4	3	2	0	4	2
18	FW	(Ivory Coast) CIV	Koffi Mechac	11	1	10	1	1	0	0	0	0	0
23	FW	(Algeria) ALG	Rachid Nadji	21	8	14	7	3	1	0	0	4	0
	FW	(Algeria) ALG	Abdelhakim Amokrane	1	0	1	0	0	0	0	0	0	0
Players transferred out during the season
	MF	(Belgium) BEL	Lens Annab	3	0	3	0	0	0	0	0	0	0
29	FW	(Algeria) ALG	Karim Soltani	7	1	7	1	0	0	0	0	0	0
21	FW	(Algeria) ALG	Mohamed Chalali	14	3	13	3	1	0	0	0	0	0

Last updated: 19 November 2017
Source: fr.soccerway.com

=== Goalscorers ===
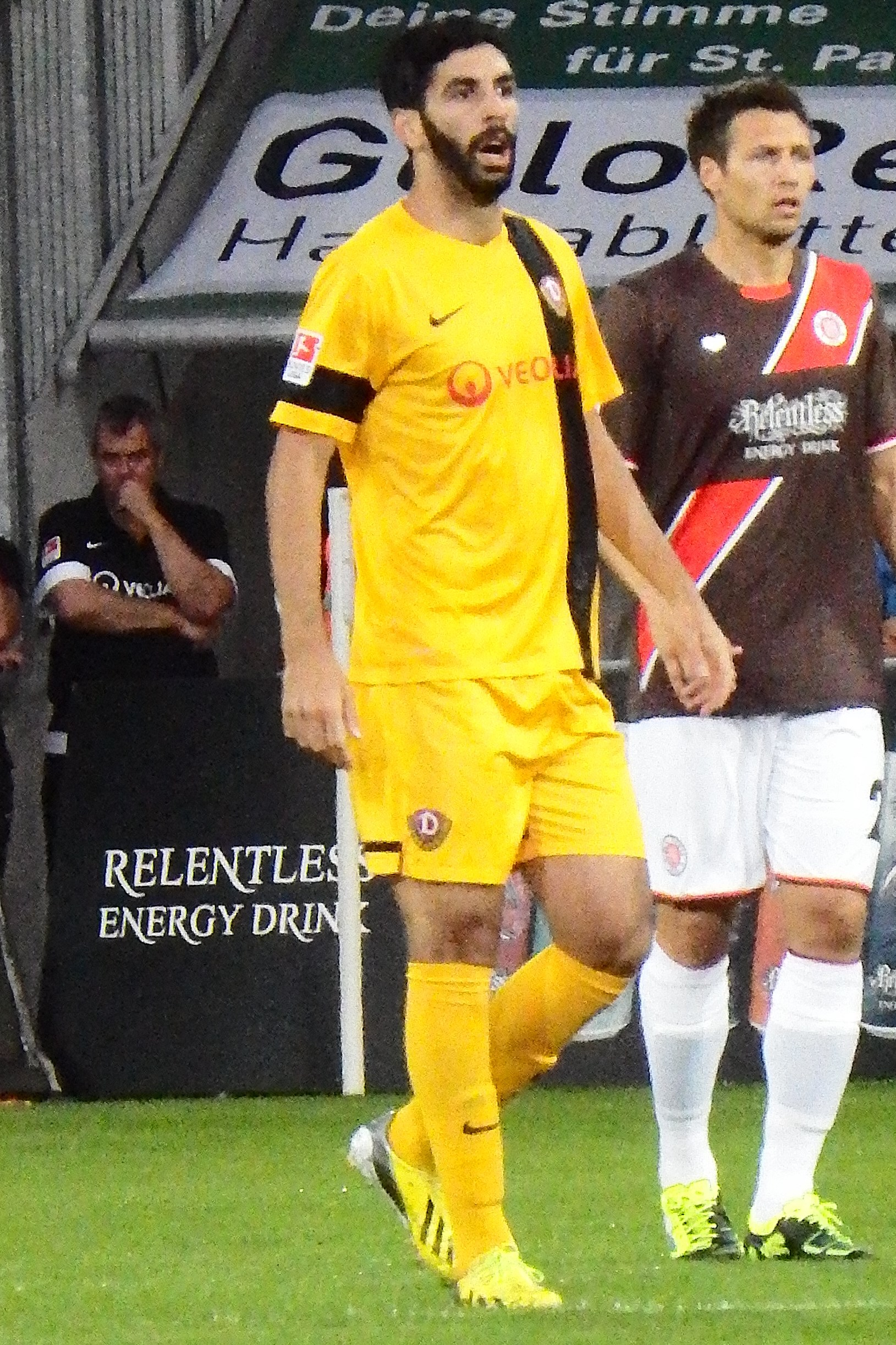
Mohamed Amine Aoudia is the team's top scorer this season with 17 goals including 12 in the Ligue 1 two goals behind the scorer Moustapha Djallit.

Includes all competitive matches. The list is sorted alphabetically by surname when total goals are equal.

No.	Nat.	Player	Pos.	L 1	AC	CL 1	C 3	TOTAL
13	(Algeria)	Mohamed Amine Aoudia	FW	12	1	3	1	17
9	(Algeria)	Laïd Madouni	FW	5	3	2	0	10
23	(Algeria)	Rachid Nadji	FW	7	1	0	0	8
36	(Algeria)	Akram Djahnit	MF	5	2	1	0	8
8	(Algeria)	Mourad Delhoum	MF	5	1	2	0	8
10	(Algeria)	Hacène El Okbi	MF	4	0	0	1	4
21	(Algeria)	Mohamed Chalali	FW	3	0	0	0	3
15	(Algeria)	Mohamed El Amine Tiouli	MF	2	1	0	0	3
14	(Algeria)	Amir Karaoui	MF	2	1	0	0	3
33	(Algeria)	Mohamed Khoutir Ziti	DF	2	0	0	0	2
7	(Algeria)	Kaled Gourmi	MF	1	0	1	0	2
3	(Algeria)	Riad Benchadi	DF	0	2	0	0	2
29	(Algeria)	Karim Soltani	FW	1	0	0	0	1
18	(Ivory Coast)	Koffi Mechac	FW	1	0	0	0	1
16	(Algeria)	Rachid Ferrahi	MF	1	0	0	0	1
5	(Algeria)	Adel Lakhdari	DF	1	0	0	0	1
28	(Algeria)	Farès Benabderahmane	DF	1	0	0	0	1
Own Goals				0	0	0	0	0
Totals				55	12	9	2	78

== Transfers ==
=== In ===
Date	Pos	Player	From club	Transfer fee	Source
3 June 2012	DF	(Algeria) Mohamed Lagraâ	USM El Harrach	Undisclosed	
5 June 2012	DF	(Algeria) Mohamed Khoutir Ziti	CS Constantine	Undisclosed	
5 June 2012	FW	(Algeria) Laïd Madouni	MC Saïda	Undisclosed	
26 June 2012	MF	(Algeria) Hacène El Okbi	NA Hussein Dey	Undisclosed	
26 June 2012	DF	(Algeria) Farès Benabderahmane	CR Belouizdad	Undisclosed	
1 July 2012	GK	(Algeria) (France) Sofiane Khedairia	(France) Le Mans FC B	Free transfer	
11 July 2012	DF	(Mali) Demba Barry	(Sudan) Al-Hilal Omdurman	Undisclosed	
11 July 2012	MF	(Belgium) Lens Annab	(Belgium) Westerlo	Undisclosed	
1 August 2012	GK	(Algeria) Nadjib Ghoul	NA Hussein Dey	Undisclosed	
6 August 2012	FW	(Ivory Coast) Koffi Mechac	AS Khroub	Undisclosed	
11 August 2012	FW	(Algeria) Mohamed Chalali	(Scotland) Aberdeen	Free transfer	
16 August 2012	FW	(Algeria) Karim Soltani	(Greece) Aris Thessaloniki	Free transfer	
1 January 2013	DF	(Algeria) Younes Djeroudi	WA Tlemcen	Undisclosed	
6 January 2013	DF	(Algeria) Abdelkrim Mammeri	CR Belouizdad	Undisclosed	
30 January 2013	MF	(Algeria) Faouzi Yaya	NA Hussein Dey	Return from loan	

=== Out ===
Date	Pos	Player	To club	Transfer fee	Source
13 June 2012	MF	(Algeria) Abdelmoumene Djabou	(Tunisia) Club Africain	€1,363,621.30; 4,000,000 DA	
1 July 2012	FW	(Algeria) Youcef Ghazali	ASO Chlef	Undisclosed	
16 January 2013	MF	(Belgium) Lens Annab	(Belgium) Lierse	Undisclosed	
20 January 2013	FW	(Algeria) Karim Soltani	(Greece) Skoda Xanthi	Undisclosed	
