= Mogi Bayat =

Iranian-French businessperson (b. 1974)

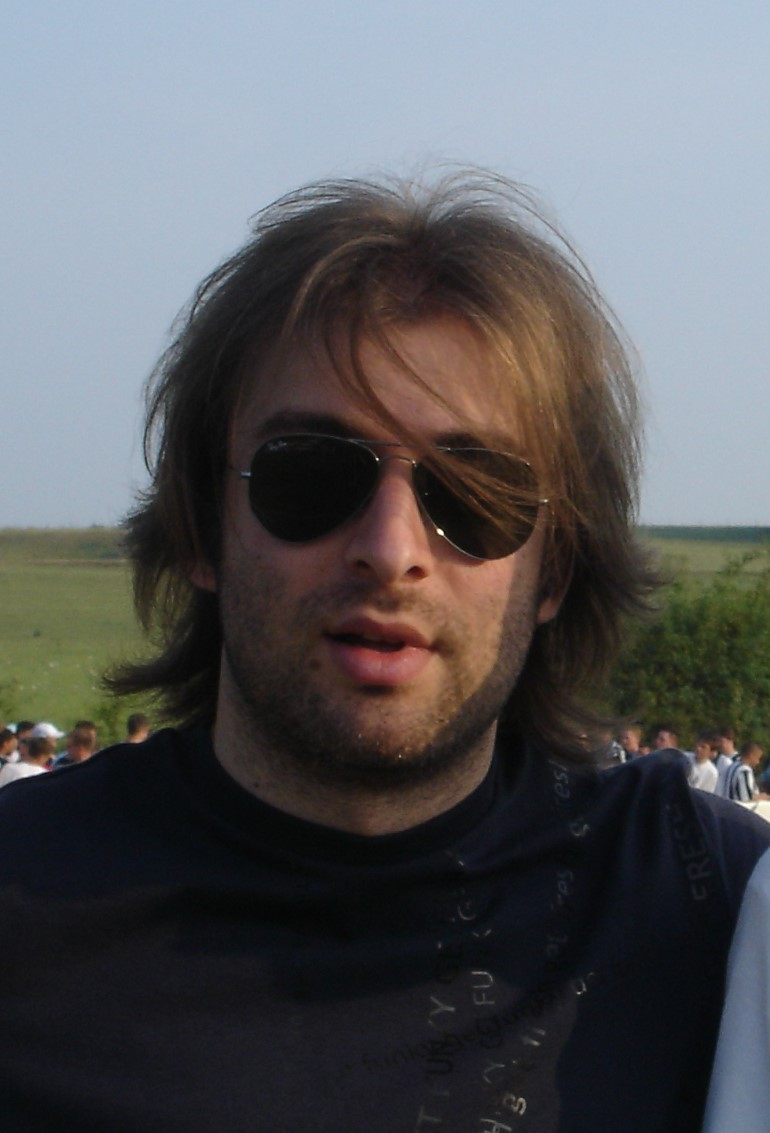
- Mogi Bayat in 2005
- Born: Arnaud Bayat; June 24, 1974 (age 52); France
- Occupation: Football Agent
- Years active: 2017–present

Mogi Bayat (Malayer, June 24, 1974), official name Arnaud Bayat, is an Iranian-French football agent and businessman. He has been associated with Football Club de Nantes, where he played a role in player recruitment and transfers.

He has been a central figure in several judicial investigations, including the Belgian "Operation Zero" football fraud inquiry and a French investigation concerning alleged illegal agent activity, money laundering and criminal association. He is the nephew of Abbas Bayat and the brother of Mehdi Bayat.

== Biography ==
=== Early life and business career ===
The Iran-born Mogi Bayat moved to the United States when he was 6 years old, where he was getting treatment. One year later, he and his family moved to France.

Bayat became a businessman and became the director of the fruit juice brand Sunnyland France. He stopped with this in 2003 when he was appointed as managing director of football club Sporting Charleroi.

=== Football career and transfer activity ===
Since December 2010 Bayat became active as a player broker. He had influence on the transfers of Anthony Limbombe, Kaveh Rezaei, Obbi Oulare, Lukasz Teodorczyk, Massimo Bruno, Adrien Trebel, Samuel Kalu, Bubacarr Sanneh, Thomas Foket and other players. He has operated primarily in Belgian football but has also been linked to transfer activity involving clubs in other countries, including France and England.

Bayat is said to have a monopoly on the transfer business of FC Nantes. He has been very influential at FC Nantes over the last decade.

== Legal issues and investigations ==
On 10 October 2018 Bayat was arrested as part of a large-scale investigation into fraud in Belgian football. He was suspected of money laundering and matchfixing.

In April 2019, the sale of €18.5 million player Aleksandar Mitrović triggered Belgian police raids and money laundering investigations. Herman Van Holsbeeck, former manager of R.S.C. Anderlecht, and Bayat were detained for questioning. Bayat was released on conditional bail six weeks later. Van Holsbeeck was released immediately.

In a radio interview with "After Foot RMC" in June 2020, Bayat compared himself to Nelson Mandela and tried to defend his record. In December 2020, in the course of the investigation against Bayat, police officers searched the training center of FC Nantes.

== See also ==
- 2017–18 Belgian football fraud investigation
