= 2017–2019 Belgian football fraud scandal =

Association football match-fixing scandal in Belgium

In Belgian football, the Operation Zero investigation, known informally as Operation Clean Hands (Dutch: Operatie Propere Handen), was conducted by the examining magistrate of Limburg on behalf of the Belgian Federal Public Prosecutor's Office from 2017 to 2019. The investigation was concerned with organised crime, money laundering, and private corruption (bribery) in Belgian football, division 1A and Division 1B specifically. Starting in late 2017, the investigation rose to national prominence on October 10, 2018, when 44 house searches were carried out across Belgium and 14 more house searches internationally. 29 suspects were arrested in Belgium, and four more abroad. Of the 29 arrested in Belgium, 20 were charged with one or more crimes. During the weeks following the raids, three additional suspects were arrested and criminally charged.

== Background ==
Following the Ye affair in 2005, the Belgian Federal Police launched the Sports Fraud Cell, a department of the Central Office for the Repression of Corruption (OCRC). Jointly managed by the Federal Public Prosecutor and the OCRC, the main task of the department is to gather and corroborate intelligence concerning sports fraud, corruption and match-fixing. If deemed necessary, an investigation is launched by the federal police. In early 2017, the Sports Fraud Cell received a report from the Belgian Financial Intelligence Unit concerning suspicious activity through tens of bank accounts in bank office in Genk. As these transactions were connected to the Belgian First Division A, the Sports Fraud Cell launched an investigation. In late 2017, the report of the investigation was passed to the federal police and the Federal Public Prosecutor.

== Investigation ==
The investigation broadly consists of three components: two parts relating to money laundering and fraud, and a third relating to potential match-fixing. Two player agents, Mogi Bayat and Dejan Veljković, would have set up, independently of each other, a scheme to hide commissions from Belgian authorities. These payments included commissions on player transfers, player and manager wages, and other payments. During the investigation of these schemes, indications of possible match-fixing arose. The match-fixing pertains to at least two relegation matches in 2017–18 Belgian First Division A. On 12 November, after the high-profile arrests were made, the court of appeal of Antwerp removed examining magistrate Joris Raskin from the investigation. The recusal was requested by Hans Rieder, the lawyer of referee Bart Vertenten. Rieder argued that Raskin could not be impartial and independent because he was part of the Licensing Commission of the Royal Belgian Football Association until March 2018, months after the investigation started. Although Raskin himself and the Public Prosecutor disagreed, the court of appeal did find Rieder's request compelling. Following the verdict of the Court, Rieder argued for the immediate release of his client Vertenten. Four days after the Court ordered the recusal, Vertenten was released on conditions and he resumed his main job as radiologist at the University Hospital UZ Brussel.

On 20 November, Dejan Veljković, widely regarded as a key suspect in the investigation, signed a plea deal with the prosecution. As part of the plea deal, Veljkovic will serve a suspended sentence of 5 years and pay a (suspended) fine of €80,000. Additionally, all illegally acquired assets would be seized by the government. Although informal plea deals were used before, Veljkovic was the first to sign a deal where specific sentence reduction is assured by prosecutors. A law allowing these formal agreements was instated only months before the arrests, in August 2018, meaning Veljkovic is the first official spijtoptant in Belgian history. According to the law, a spijtoptant is suspect able to provide "substantial, revealing, sincere, and complete information" about serious crimes, e.g. organised crime or terrorism. In exchange for this information, the spijtoptant can get a more lenient sentence. Following the deal, Veljkovic was released on strict conditions. On 19–20 February 2019, three months after Veljkovic's plea deal, 16 more people were questioned by investigators. Additionally, 3 buildings were searched. Among those questioned were Peter Maes, already charged in the investigation, Roger Lambrecht, chairman of Lokeren, Erwin Lemmens, Herbert Houben, former chairman of KRC Genk, and Patrick Janssens, former CEO of KRC Genk. From 25 June until 28 June, additional people including Georges Leekens, François De Keersmaecker, Ivan Leko, Herman Van Holsbeeck, and Steven Martens, were interrogated, confronting them with Dejan Velkovic's statements.

In January 2021, the investigation based on the statements of Veljkovic was completed which resulted in a request by the federal prosecutor's office to bring 57 of the 73 suspects to court for various charges ranging from money laundering, financial fraud and fictive arrangements over influencing decisions of the disputes committee to outright match fixing. The investigation points towards Uros Jankovic, business partner of Veljkovic, as a leading person in setting up a system of hidden fees and payments towards players, managers, sports agents and club board members. Amongst the final list of suspects are some well known names, including referees Bart Vertenten and Sébastien Delferière, agent Mogi Bayat, managers Peter Maes, Ivan Leko, Glen De Boeck and Yannick Ferrera. Several club managers are involved, including Thierry Steemans (Mechelen), Herman Van Holsbeeck (Anderlecht), Vincent Mannaert (Club Brugge), Michel Louwagie (Gent), Patrick Janssens (Genk), Bruno Venanzi (Standard Liège), Roger Lambrecht (Lokeren), and Bart Verhaeghe (Club Brugge). Also former Belgian FA president François De Keersmaecker and former secretary-general Steven Martens are called up to the stand. It is estimated 16 of the 26 clubs at the highest two levels of Belgian football are somehow involved, most notably KV Mechelen, Anderlecht, Charleroi, Standard, Kortrijk, Oud-Heverlee Leuven, Waasland-Beveren, Lokeren, Genk, Club Brugge, and Gent. Besides this list of 57 suspects being prosecuted, the "Special Tax Inspection" unit (Dutch: Bijzondere Belastinginspectie) of the Federal Public Service Finance also has a list of more than 200 names (individuals and organisations such as football clubs) which are being specially audited due to a suspicion of financial fraud, tax evasion or money laundering. Although this list has not been released, it is known that there is a large overlap between the 57 names being prosecuted and the more than 200 individuals being audited.

== 10 October 2018 searches ==
Searched club headquarters

On 10 October 2018, the federal police searched 44 buildings across Belgium, mostly focused on football club headquarters and suspect's residences. The headquarters of RSC Anderlecht, Club Brugge, KRC Genk, KV Kortrijk, KV Mechelen, KV Oostende, Sporting Lokeren, AA Gent, and Standard Liège were searched. During these searches, documents and contracts pertaining to player agents Mogi Bayat and Deljan Veljkovic were seized. 3 luxury watches were seized as well. Simultaneously, residences of club board members, player agents, referees, a former lawyer, journalists and a manager were searched. Further raids occurred at an accountancy bureau and 2 jewelry stores. During these raids, empty luxury watch boxes valued at 8 million euros, jewels, luxury watches, and cash were seized. As a result of these searches, 28 people were arrested, most of them very early in the morning.

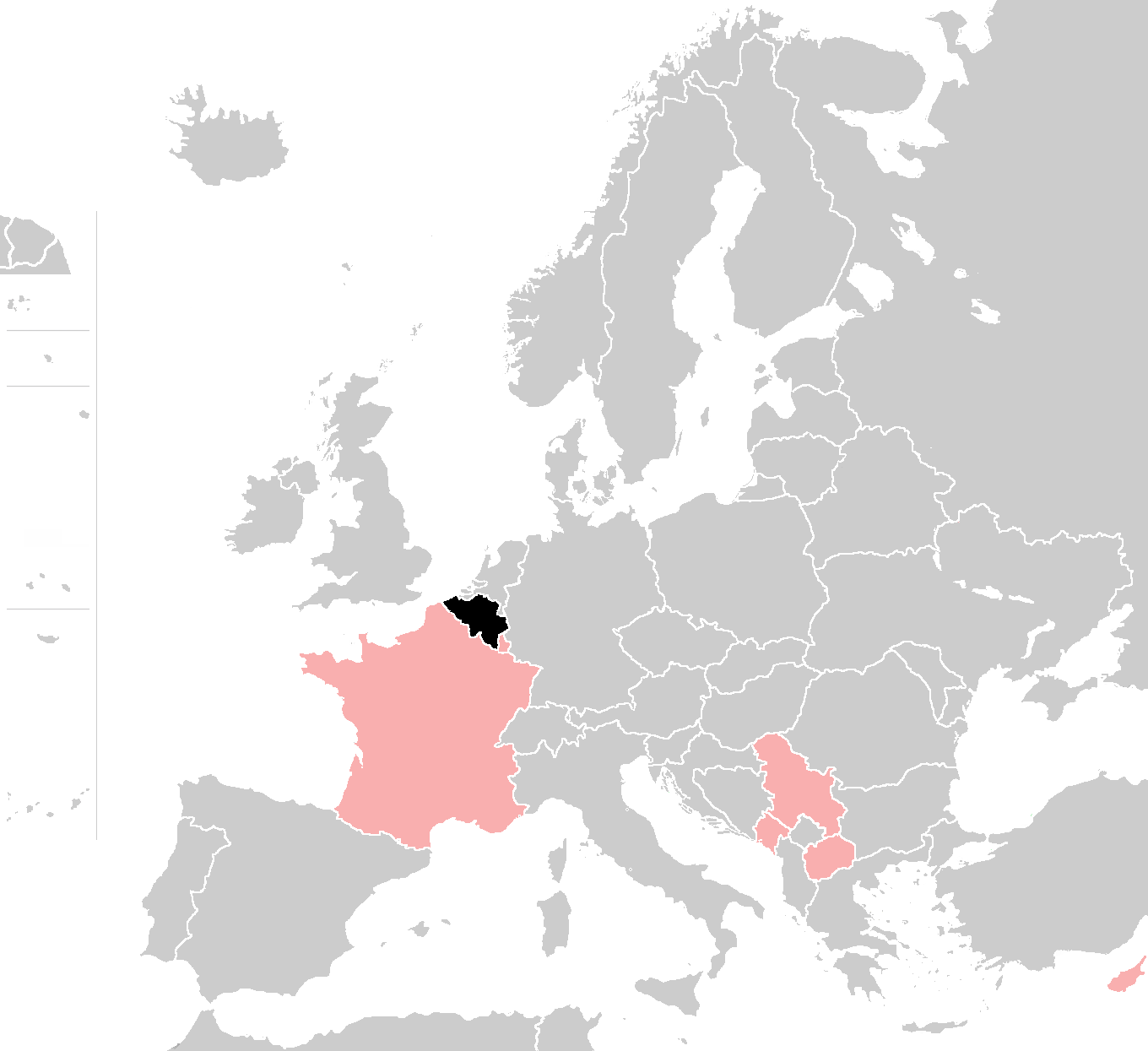
Countries where searches were performed.

Internationally, 14 locations were searched in 6 other countries: France, Luxembourg, Cyprus, Montenegro, Serbia, and North Macedonia. During these searches, coordinated by Eurojust, documents and assets on bank accounts and in safes worth a total amount of 3.6 million euros were seized. No arrests were made during the searches at banks and a company in Luxembourg.

In Cyprus, a 52-year-old man was arrested on a European arrest warrant, with extradition procedures underway. More than 15 Cypriot police officers, and two Belgian investigators were involved in the searches of four properties in Nicosia and Famagusta, where four computers, two laptops, two iPads, and documents were seized. Six locations in the cities Belgrade and Niš, Serbia, were searched, resulting in the seizure of up to €800,000 which allegedly originated from organised crime in Belgium. Uros Jankovic, business associate of Dejan Veljković, was also arrested Wednesday in Belgrade and ordered to be extradited. Four people were arrested during these international searches, and two European arrest warrants were issued. In total, 184 Belgian and 36 foreign police officers participated in the searches, in Belgium and abroad.

Because of the size and scope of the investigation, as well as the number of suspects arrested after the searches, up to three examining magistrates were working concurrently to process those arrested. Multiple examining magistrates being assigned to a single investigation is very unusual in Belgium, with the exception of terrorism cases.

== September 2019 searches ==
In September 2019, two people were detained in connection with the inquiry into alleged fraud involving the transfer of football players. Agent, Christophe Henrotary was detained in Monaco; one of his associates was detained in Belgium. Prosecutors based the arrests on the ongoing inquiry of the April 2015 transfer of Aleksandar Mitrović from RSC Anderlecht to Newcastle United F.C. In April, Anderlecht's premises were searched due to the 2017–18 season suspected fraud. On 23 September 2019, Monaco's appeal court released Christophe Henrotray on bail of €250,000. At that time the court had not ruled on the request for his extradition to Belgium. Federal Prosecutor and Investigating Judge Michel Claise had been conducting the investigation into the suspected money laundering and criminal association, which had led to the raids in Monaco, two in Belgium and one in London. Henrotray and his associate Christophe Cheniaux, who was arrested in Liège, were charged with fraud, forgery, money laundering and criminal associations.

== Charges ==
Throughout the investigation, 23 people were accused of one or multiple crimes. 17 were released on conditions and 6 were released without conditions. Among those charged are player agents, referees, club executives and board members, journalists, players, and managers.

Accused	Charge(s)	Status
Mogi Bayat, player agent	Criminal organisation, money laundering	Released on conditions
Marija Bogojevska, Dejan Veljković's wife	Criminal organisation, money laundering	Released on conditions
Fabien Camus, ex-KV Mechelen player	Criminal organisation, money laundering	Released on conditions
Frank Dekeyser, journalist for Het Laatste Nieuws	Criminal organisation, private corruption (bribery)	Released without conditions
Sébastien Delferière, referee	Criminal organisation, money laundering, private corruption (bribery)	Released on conditions
Laurent Denis, Mogi Bayat's attorney	Criminal organisation, money laundering	Released on conditions
Dirk Huyck, chairman of Waasland-Beveren	Criminal organisation, private corruption (bribery)	Released on conditions
Stijn Joris, journalist for Het Laatste Nieuws	Criminal organisation, private corruption (bribery)	Released without conditions
Ivan Leko, manager of Club Brugge	Money laundering	Released without conditions
Peter Maes, former manager of Lokeren	Criminal organisation, money laundering	Released on conditions
Evert Maeschalck, player agent	Private corruption (bribery)	Released without conditions
Karim Mejjati, player agent	Money laundering	Released on conditions
Walter Mortelmans, player agent	Criminal organisation, private corruption (bribery)	Released on conditions
Olivier Myny, football player for OH Leuven, previously Waasland-Beveren	Criminal organisation, private corruption (bribery)	Released without conditions
Dragan Siljanoski, player agent	Money laundering	Released on conditions
Olivier Somers, shareholder of KV Mechelen	Criminal organisation, money laundering, private corruption (bribery)	Released on conditions
Thierry Steemans, financial director of KV Mechelen	Criminal organisation, money laundering, private corruption (bribery)	Released on conditions
Olivier Swolfs, financial director of Waasland-Beveren	Criminal organisation, private corruption (bribery)	Released on conditions
Thomas Troch, player agent	Criminal organisation, private corruption (bribery)	Released on conditions
David Van den Broeck, journalist for Het Nieuwsblad and Gazet van Antwerpen	Criminal organisation, private corruption (bribery)	Released without conditions
Stefaan Vanroy, sporting director of KV Mechelen	Criminal organisation, money laundering, private corruption (bribery)	Released on conditions
Dejan Veljkovic, player agent	Criminal organisation, money laundering, private corruption (bribery)	Released on conditions
Bart Vertenten, referee	Criminal organisation, private corruption (bribery)	Released on conditions

== Royal Belgian Football Association investigation ==
On 23 April 2019, the Investigating Commission of the Royal Belgian Football Association completed its investigation into possible match-fixing during the matches KV Mechelen v. Waasland-Beveren (2–0) and K.A.S. Eupen v. Royal Excel Mouscron (4-0), both on the final matchday of the 2017–18 Belgian First Division A. KV Mechelen and Waasland-Beveren, as well as 13 persons were summoned before the Disputes Appeals Commission. On 30 April 2019, public hearings started before the Commission. While the hearings were ongoing, KV Mechelen asked the Business Court in Brussels to suspend the proceeding until the criminal investigation completed; this request was denied. After a month of hearings, the verdict was announced on 1 June 2019 and found that Mechelen was guilty of match-fixing and forced to relegate to the Belgian First Division B and start the coming season with a 12-point penalty. Waasland-Beveren was cleared of charges. KV Mechelen appealed the verdict to the Belgian Arbitration Court for Sports, which ruled on 17 July 2019 that KV Mechelen was indeed guilty of match-fixing, but couldn't be punished with relegation to the Belgian First Division B as the match-fixing occurred during a previous season. Mechelen was however stripped of its right to play in the UEFA Europa League and not allowed to participate in the 2019–20 Belgian Cup.

Accused (role)	Penalty
KV Mechelen (accused club)	Convicted of match-fixing: one season without European football, one season without Belgian Cup football.
Waasland-Beveren (accused club)	Acquitted.
Walter Clippeleyr (member of management at Waasland-Beveren)	Acquitted.
Dirk Huyck (president of Waasland-Beveren)	Convicted of failing to report match-fixing: 1-year Royal Belgian Football Association suspension (suspended sentence).
Evert Maeschalck (player agent)	Acquitted.
Walter Mortelmans (player agent)	Convicted of match-fixing: 3-year suspension from being a player agent (of which 2 years suspended).
Olivier Myny (former player of Waasland-Beveren)	Acquitted
Olivier Somers (shareholder KV Mechelen)	Convicted of match-fixing: 10-year Royal Belgian Football Association suspension.
Thierry Steemans (financial director of KV Mechelen)	Convicted of match-fixing: 10-year Royal Belgian Football Association suspension.
Olivier Swolfs (financial director of Waasland-Beveren)	Convicted of failing to report match-fixing: 1-year Royal Belgian Football Association suspension.
Johan Timmermans (former president of KV Mechelen)	Convicted of match-fixing: 10-year Royal Belgian Football Association suspension.
Thomas Troch (player agent)	Convicted of match-fixing: 3-year suspension from being a player agent (of which 1 year suspended).
Jozef Van Remoortel (vice-president of Waasland-Beveren)	Acquitted.
Stefaan Vanroy (sports director of KV Mechelen)	Convicted of match-fixing: 7-year Royal Belgian Football Association suspension.
Dejan Veljkovic (player agent)	Convicted of match-fixing: 10-year suspension from being a player agent

== Civil parties ==
In Belgian criminal law, a civil party (nl) is a person or entity claiming to be injured by a crime, to be awarded damages following the proceedings. As of November 2018, 4 entities have claimed to be a civil party to the investigation: the Royal Belgian Football Association, the Pro League, the association of all the Belgian professional football teams, and KFCO Beerschot Wilrijk.

== Reactions ==
On 11 October 2018, the Pro League announced that the tenth match day for the First Division B, planned for 13–14 October, would be postponed. Johan Verbist, arbitration coordinator for the Royal Belgian Football Association (RBFA), announced on October 11 that Bart Vertenten and Sébastien Delferière were suspended following the investigation, with the RBFA aiming to make this suspension permanent. Delferière was supposed to referee a Nations League match on October 13, but was quickly replaced by the UEFA at the request of Verbist.

Several politicians, including deputy prime minister Kris Peeters, finance minister Johan Van Overtveldt, Flemish sports minister Philippe Muyters, and social affairs minister Maggie De Block, announced their intentions to re-evaluate the financial benefits professional players receive following news of the scandal. Since 1978, professional sports players are taxed at a reduced RSZ (Social security) rate, designed to promote the type of employment at the time.

On 17 October 2018, the Pro League announced it will set up a commission consisting of three independent experts, tasked with proposing reforms to the board of directors. This commission will consist of renowned jurist Melchior Wathelet, Wouter Lambrecht, and Pierre François, CEO of the Pro League. On 19 October, a week after two sports journalists working for Het Laatste Nieuws were charged, the newspaper announced that its top sports journalist would be taking a leave of absence, to analyze whether any deontological rule was breached. Although the journalist was not charged, he came under scrutiny because of his close ties to one of the involved player agents.

During an interview on De Ochtend, a Radio 1 programme, Sports Fraud Cell coordinator Eric Bisschop called for regulations for player agents in coordination with European directives, federal and regional laws, as well as collaboration with the RBFA, UEFA and FIFA. On 6 November, almost a month after the news of the raids broke, Marc Coucke and Pierre François, chairman and CEO of the Pro League respectively, testified before the Chamber of Representatives. During a session held by the Finances and Budget committee, Coucke defended the RSZ "tax shelter" for professional sports players. Politicians from all major Flemish parties announced intentions to revise these reductions, however Coucke mitigated this, saying the Belgian professional football industry could not afford the loss of this favorable rate and would need a different kind of subsidy.
