= Mehdi Bayat =

French-Iranian businessman

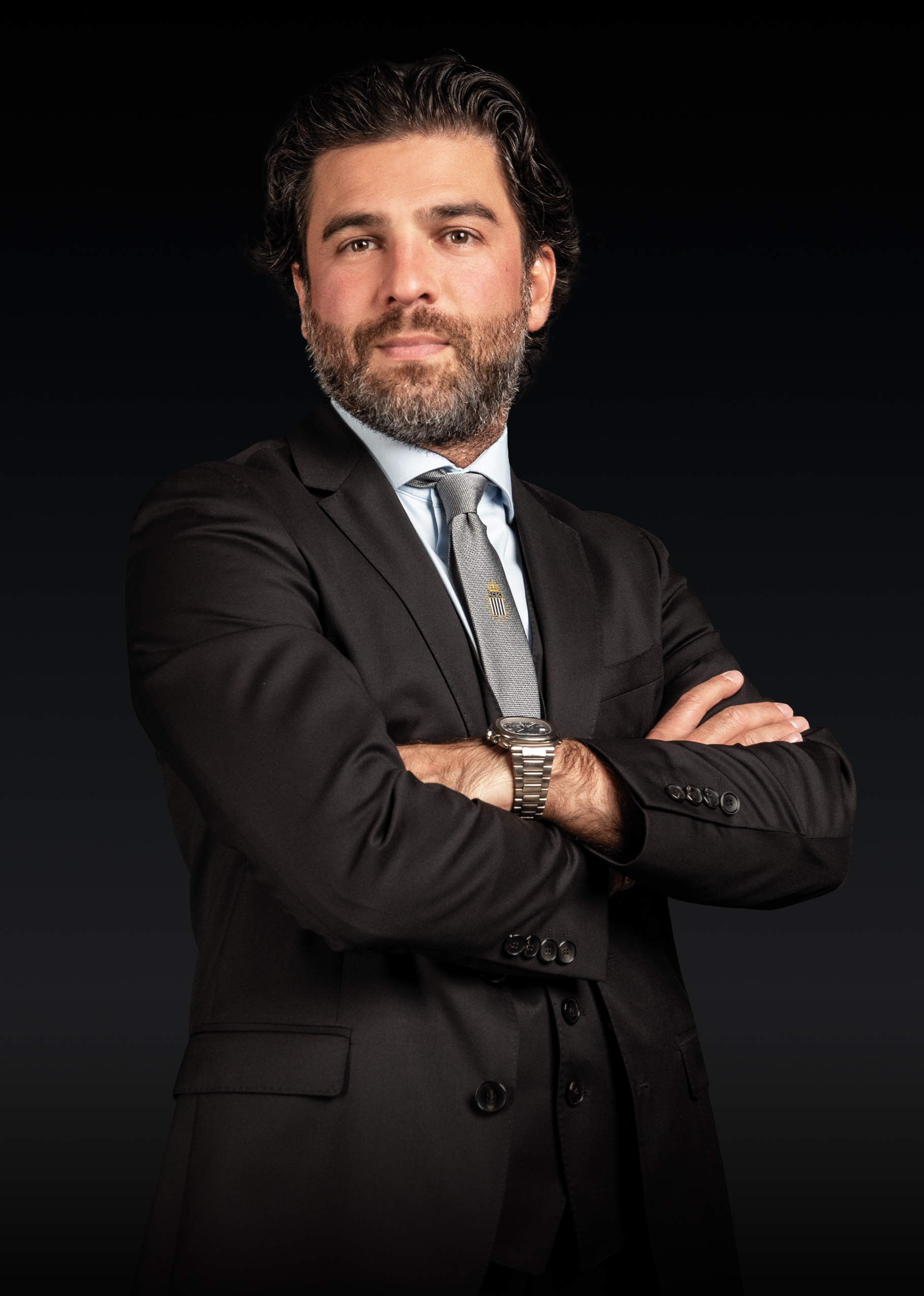
- Born: Mehdigholi Bayat; 6 January 1979 (age 47); Malayer, Iran
- Citizenship: French
- Father: Abbas Bayat
- Relatives: Mogi Bayat (brother)

Mehdigholi Bayat (born 6 January 1979 in Tehran) is an Iranian sports administrator who served as president of the Royal Belgian Football Association and managing director of Royal Charleroi Sporting Club.

== Biography ==
Mehdi Bayat spent his childhood and teenage years in the Cannes area. While his parents regularly traveled to Iran, he decided to settle in the south of France. As a young teenager, he was under the thumb of his older brother Mogi Bayat, who was five years his senior.

Mehdi Bayat attended school there, graduating from the EDHEC Business School. In the early 2000s, at the age of 21, he returned to Iran for a year.

Upon his return to France, Mehdi Bayat first worked with his brother in Paris at their uncle Abbas's company, before going on to manage a communications company in the south of France.

== Career ==
Born in Tehran and raised in Cannes, Mehdi Bayat has been the managing director of Charleroi since September 2012. He was President of the Royal Belgian Football Association from 2019 to 2021.
