= 1992–93 Belgian Cup =

Tournament details
- Country: Belgium

Final positions
- Champions: Standard Liège
- Runners-up: R Charleroi SC

Tournament statistics
- Matches played: 33
- Goals scored: 118 (3.58 per match)
- Top goal scorer(s): Johnny Bosman; Dante Brogno (4 goals)

The 1992–93 Belgian Cup was the 38th season of the main knockout competition in Belgian association football, the Belgian Cup.

== Final rounds ==
For the first time, the final phase started in the round of 32 when all clubs from the first division entered the competition (18 clubs plus 14 clubs from the qualifications). All rounds were played in one leg except for the semifinals. The final game was played at the Constant Vanden Stock Stadium in Brussels and won by Standard Liège against Sporting Charleroi on 6 June 1993.

=== Bracket ===
Round of 32
FC Liège	4
Hoogstraten	2
Lokeren	1
Anderlecht	2
Geel	2*
Lierse	1
ROC Charleroi	4
Mouscron	1
R Charleroi SC	2
Gent	1
Hemptinne-Eghezée	1
Club Brugge	4
Beveren	3
KFC Roeselare	1
KV Mechelen	9
Beringen	0
Sérésien	3
Molenbeek	1
Genk	0
Boom	2
Waregem	1
Eeklo	0
Antwerp	4
Poederlee	0
Beerschot	0(6)
Cappellen	0(7)
Germinal Ekeren	2(4)
Diest	2(2)
Lommelse	5
Cercle Brugge	2
Standard Liège	7
Mol	1

Round of 16
FC Liège	0
Anderlecht	2
Geel	1
ROC Charleroi	0
R Charleroi SC	3
Club Brugge	2
Beveren	5
KV Mechelen	2
Sérésien	1
Boom	0
Waregem	2
Antwerp	1
Cappellen	1
Germinal Ekeren	2
Lommelse	0
Standard Liège	1

Quarter-finals
Anderlecht	7
Geel	1
R Charleroi SC	2
Beveren	0
Sérésien	0
Waregem	1
Germinal Ekeren	0
Standard Liège	1

Semifinals
Anderlecht	1	2
R Charleroi SC	2	3
Waregem	1	1
Standard Liège	1	2

Final
Standard Liège	2
R Charleroi SC	0

* after extra time

=== Final ===
6 June 1993
16:00

Standard de Liège	2–0	Charleroi
Vos 55'; Léonard 63'

Constant Vanden Stock Stadium, Anderlecht
Referee: Alphonse Constantin
