= Philip Haagdoren =

Belgian footballer (born 1970)

Personal information
- Date of birth: 25 June 1970 (age 56)
- Place of birth: Lommel, Belgium
- Height: 1.75 m (5 ft 9 in)
- Position: Right midfielder

Team information
- Current team: Lommel (team manager)

Youth career
- 1978–1987: Lommel

Senior career*
Years	Team	Apps	(Gls)
1987–1993	Lommel	138	(28)
1993–1996	Anderlecht	56	(10)
1996	→ Beveren (loan)	12	(2)
1996–1999	Lierse	91	(16)
1999–2004	Germinal Beerschot	139	(16)
2004–2007	KVSK United	88	(32)
Total		524	(104)

International career
1997	Belgium	1	(0)

Managerial career
- 2007: KVSK United (player-manager)
- 2011–2013: Lommel United
- 2016: Bocholter VV
- * Club domestic league appearances and goals

Philip Haagdoren (born 25 June 1970) is a Belgian former footballer. He played in one match for the Belgium national football team in 1997.

== Honours ==
Lierse

- Belgian First Division: 1996–97
