= Laïd Madouni =

Algerian footballer (born 1986)

Personal information
- Full name: Laïd Madouni
- Date of birth: June 23, 1986 (age 40)
- Place of birth: Algeria
- Position: Forward

Team information
- Current team: ES Mostaganem
- Number: 9

Senior career*
Years	Team	Apps	(Gls)
2008–2010	ES Mostaganem	-	(-)
2010–2012	MC Saïda	46	(12)
2012–2014	ES Sétif	0	(0)
2014–2016	ASO Chlef	0	(0)
2016–2017	CA Bordj Bou Arreridj	0	(0)
2017–	ES Mostaganem	0	(0)
- * Club domestic league appearances and goals as of 00:00, June 22, 2017 (UTC)

Laïd Madouni, sometimes spelt as El Aïd Madouni, (born June 23, 1986) is an Algerian football player who plays for ES Mostaganem in the Algerian Ligue Professionnelle 2.

== Club career ==
In the summer of 2009, Madouni was close to joining MO Constantine. However, the club was not willing to pay the high transfer fee set by the team president.

In May 2010, Madouni was linked with a move to WA Tlemcen, after scoring 13 goals in the 2009–10 season for ES Mostaganem. He was also linked to a number of other first division clubs including MC Oran, USM Blida and CA Bordj Bou Arréridj. However, on July 12, Madouni signed a contract with MC Saïda, joining them on a free transfer.
