= Mario Notaro =

Belgian football manager

Personal information
- Full name: Mario Notaro
- Date of birth: May 7, 1950 (age 76)
- Place of birth: Belgium

Team information
- Current team: Charleroi

Managerial career
- Years: Team
- 2012: Charleroi (interim)
- 2013: Charleroi

Mario Notaro is a Belgian football manager. Currently he is working for Charleroi as an assistant manager in the Belgian Pro League. Notaro was head coach of Charleroi on two occasions, in 2012 in 2013.
