= Mohamed Chalali =

Algerian footballer (born 1989)

Personal information
- Full name: Mohamed Chalali
- Date of birth: 4 April 1989 (age 37)
- Place of birth: Montreuil-sous-Bois, Paris, France
- Height: 1.77 m (5 ft 10 in)
- Position: Striker

Team information
- Current team: FC Versailles 78

Youth career
- 2000–2003: CA Romainville
- 2003–2007: Le Havre

Senior career*
Years	Team	Apps	(Gls)
2007–2009	Le Havre	2	(0)
2009–2010	Châteauroux	1	(0)
2010–2011	Panionios	12	(0)
2011–2012	Aberdeen	16	(1)
2012–2013	ES Sétif	13	(3)
2013	JS Kabylie	13	(4)
2013–2014	JSM Béjaïa	16	(1)
2014–2016	Olympique Noisy-le-Sec	40	(17)
2016–2017	ACBB	28	(15)
2017	Lusitanos Saint-Maur	10	(4)
2018	ACBB	4	(4)
2018–	Versailles	11	(2)

International career
2008	Algeria U20	3	(0)
2010–2012	Algeria U23	13	(9)
2012	Algeria	1	(0)
- * Club domestic league appearances and goals as of 10:04, 6 December 2018 (UTC)

Mohamed Chalali (born 4 April 1989) is an Algerian footballer. He plays for FC Versailles 78 in the Championnat National 3.

== Personal ==
Chalali was born in Montreuil-sous-Bois, Paris, to Algerian parents. His family is originally from the village of Ighil Ouantar, in the Seddouk District of Béjaïa.

== Club career ==
=== France ===
Chalali began his career with CA Romainville before he was scouted in summer 2003 from Le Havre AC. He made his Ligue 2 debut on 2 November 2007, coming on as a substitute against EA Guingamp. On 15 July 2009 he agreed a contract with LB Châteauroux.

=== Greece ===
On 23 August 2010, Chalali signed a three-year contract with Greek club Panionios, joining them on a free transfer from Châteauroux. He made 12 league appearances for the club, 5 of which were as substitute.

=== Scotland ===
The 2011 Greek riots motivated Chalali to seek a move abroad, and former Rangers defender and fellow Algerian Majid Bougherra recommended that he consider playing in Scotland. On 23 August 2011, Chalali signed for Scottish Premier League club Aberdeen. He had been recommended to Aberdeen manager Craig Brown by former Super League Greece colleague Youl Mawene, and had impressed during a trial earlier in the same month. Brown said Chalali had been the most impressive of all the trialists at the club in the 2011 summer transfer window, including Icelandic international Kari Arnason and former Dutch under-21 Maceo Rigters.

On the same day, despite having gone without sleep the previous evening to return to Greece to retrieve transfer-related paperwork, Chalali made his debut for Aberdeen as a second-half substitute in a 2011–12 Scottish League Cup win against Dundee. He was assigned squad number 18 for the 2011–12 Scottish Premier League season, and made his league debut, also as a substitute, in a 2–0 defeat away to Rangers on 28 August 2011. He made his first start for the club in an Aberdeenshire Cup semi-final fixture against Deveronvale the following day.

He scored his first goals for the club on 13 September 2011 in a testimonial match against Highland League side Keith, where he got a double and created another in a 6–0 victory. His first league start came in a 2–2 draw against Kilmarnock on 17 September 2011. He scored his first league goal for Aberdeen at Tannadice against Dundee United, scoring the equaliser to make it 1–1, in a game which Aberdeen went on to win 2–1. In the same week he scored his second competitive goal for Aberdeen, in a 4–0 win in the Scottish Cup against Forfar. Near the end of the 2011–12 season, Chalali was advised that his contract with Aberdeen would not be extended.

=== Algeria ===
On 10 August 2012, Chalali signed a two-year contract with Algerian Ligue Professionnelle 1 club ES Sétif.

== International career ==
Chalali has three caps with the Algerian Under 20 National Team. On 12 October 2010, Chalali made his debut for the Algerian Under-23 National Team in a 1–0 friendly win over Qatar.

He went on to become captain of the U-23 side. In August 2011, he informed Aberdeen that he was likely to feature in the 2011 CAF U-23 Championship, a tournament that also serves as the qualification process for the 2012 Olympics, and that he had ambitions to represent the full national side in the qualifiers for the 2012 African Cup of Nations. On 16 November 2011, he was selected as part of Algeria's squad for the 2011 CAF U-23 Championship in Morocco.
