= Zoltán Kovac (footballer, born 1954) =

Hungarian footballer and manager

Zoltán Kovács
Personal information
- Birth name: Zoltán Kovac
- Date of birth: 16 October 1954 (age 72)
- Place of birth: Osijek, SR Croatia, SFR Yugoslavia
- Position: Defender

Team information
- Current team: APOEL (Academy technical director)

Managerial career
- Years: Team
- 2001–2004: Belgium U18
- 2009–2010: Union St. Gilloise
- 2011: Charleroi SC
- 2013: Diósgyőri VTK

Zoltán Kovács (born Zoltán Kovac, 16 October 1954) is a Croatian-born Hungarian former footballer and manager. He is the current technical director of APOEL's youth academies.

== Biography ==
Kovac was born in Osijek, Croatia, back then part of SFR Yugoslavia, and emigrated in 1956 with his Hungarian father and Croatian mother to Belgium.

=== Early career ===
He started his football career in the youth teams at the club RAA Louvière in Belgium and captained the U 16. Then he played for one year in the second team and quickly became one of the biggest hopes of the club which meanwhile reached the second national division. He was called back to the U 20 to reinforce the team at the end of the season and won the title of Belgian Champion with them.

=== Professional career ===
He then signed a three-years contract with his club and took part in the accession to the first National Division through play-offs. So, he played for ten years as a semi-professional player as central defender, working meanwhile as an English and Dutch teacher.

=== International career ===
Kovács played for two years with the Hungary national under-18 football team.

=== Education ===
As a student at university Kovac had to make a choice between a professional football career and his studies.

=== Coaching career ===
At the age of 35 he had to stop his football career because of an injury at his Achilles heel. The club manager immediately proposed him to coach the U 14 and he got much success with the team. That's how he became passionately fond of youth formation and he accumulated the champion titles with his U 12, U 14, U 16 and U 20 teams.

His coaching career advanced when Franky Vercauteren, ex national coach, asked him to coach the U 20 at KV Mechelen: once again he became champion with his team. He was called back to La Louvière to coach the national U 19 and won the national play-offs. His experience and results as a youth formator, post formator and as a pedagogue shoot him to the job of Formation Technical Director at La Louvière in 1st division.

During those four years he completely reorganized the club and its formation system: so, he shot most of the 10 youth teams among the first three in each national championship. Six La Louvière players were preselected for the national teams and two of them played with the national teams which had never occurred before.

==== National Belgian Federation: UEFA courses teacher and national coach ====
Meanwhile, he followed the UEFA courses, where his brilliant marks drew the attention of the National Belgian Football federation which, before he had finished his courses, proposed him a job as a UEFA courses teacher at the National Federation.

He very quickly climbed the ladder at the Belgian Football Federation and became supervisor of the UEFA courses in all the southern part of Belgium and in the capital city, Brussels.

His career accelerated again when the Belgian Federation offered him a newly created job. Kovac became UEFA courses teacher for ex-professionals and UEFA courses teacher for the ex-international players with more than 40 caps. Among his pupils, he gave courses to Michel Preudhomme, Enzo Scifo, Marc Wilmots. He then followed a formation of physical trainer in France at Dijon Sports Research University, courses given by the famous Cometti.

Meanwhile, Kovac refused a proposal from LOSC (France) and started negotiations with Standard under impulse of Preudhomme who wanted to get his services.

The affair was not concluded and Kovac was appointed national coach U 18 at the Belgian National Federation where he got excellent results again as Winner of the Four Nations International Tournament (Denmark, Ukraine, Belgium and Scotland)

==== Club management ====
Kovac was called back a third time to RAA Louvière and was appointed General Sports Coordinator in the club which won the Belgian Cup and played in UEFA Cup.

In 2004, Kovac accepted a new challenge: Marc Wilmots asked him to work with the first team in the famous club Saint Trond.

Kovac decided then to focus his attention on his job as a teacher for a while. Until December 2009 when the mythical Brussels club Union St. Gilloise asked him to rescue the team that was on the last position with 17 points after a long series of seven defeats at a stretch.

Kovac accepted the challenge carried out his task successfully: with 13 matches without defeat, his team finished with 42 points in May 2010.

On 24 March 2011 he was named new manager of Belgian Pro League club Charleroi SC. However, he only managed the club one game, which was lost, and on 4 April he was sacked and replaced with Luka Peruzovic.

On 17 April 2013 he became manager of Hungarian club Diósgyőri VTK.

In 2014 he was appointed Director of Development at the Romanian FA.
