= Marc Grosjean =

Belgian footballer (born 1958)

Personal information
- Date of birth: 11 September 1958 (age 68)
- Place of birth: Sprimont, Belgium

Senior career*
Years	Team	Apps	(Gls)
1979–1989	RFC Seraing		
1989–1991	KRC Mechelen		
1991–1993	RSC Andenne		

Managerial career
- 1993–1995: FC Wiltz 71
- 1995–1998: Union Namur
- 1998–2001: RAAL La Louvière
- 2001: RFC Liège
- 2002–2003: RAEC Mons
- 2004: Royal Antwerp
- 2004–2008: KAS Eupen
- 2008: RFC Seraing
- 2008–2009: RWDM Brussels
- 2009–2011: F91 Dudelange
- 2011: CS Visé
- 2015–2018: Royale Union Saint-Gilloise
- 2018: RE Virton
- 2019: RFC Seraing
- 2022: RRC Stockay Warfusée
- 2022–2023: Deinze
- * Club domestic league appearances and goals

Marc Grosjean (born 11 September 1958) is a Belgian football manager. He most recently managed Deinze in the Challenger Pro League.

== Early life ==
Grosjean is a native of Liège, Belgium.

== Career ==
In 2015, Grosjean was appointed manager of Belgian side Royale Union Saint-Gilloise. Previously, he worked in Saudi Arabia. In 2022, he was appointed manager of Belgian side RRC Stockay Warfusée.

== Personal life ==
Grosjean has been a longtime friend of Belgian manager Emilio Ferrera.
