= Chris Andries =

Belgian football manager

Personal information
- Date of birth: 11 September 1959 (age 67)

Managerial career
- Years: Team
- 1994–1995: Beerschot (assistant)
- 1995–1996: Sint-Niklaas (assistant)
- 1997–1998: Eendracht Aalst (assistant)
- 1998–2001: Red Star Waasland
- 2001–2002: Bornem
- 2002–2003: Oudenaarde
- 2003–2004: TK Meldert
- 2004–2005: KSV Temse
- 2005–2007: Oudenaarde
- 2007–2008: Willebroek-Meerhof
- 2009–2010: KSV Temse
- 2011–2012: KRC Gent
- 2011–2012: Sint-Niklaas
- 2013–2014: VW Hamme
- 2015–2016: Vosselaar
- 2017: Duffel
- 2018–2019: Malines

Chris Andries (born 11 September 1959) is a Belgian football manager. In 2022, he took over as manager at KFC Perk. As of 2025, he coaches women's football.
