= Mohamed El Amine Tiouli =

Algerian footballer (born 1987)

Personal information
- Full name: Mohamed El Amine Tiouli
- Date of birth: July 8, 1987 (age 39)
- Place of birth: Maghnia, Algeria
- Position: Midfielder

Team information
- Current team: ES Sétif
- Number: 15

Senior career*
Years	Team	Apps	(Gls)
2006–2007	IRB Maghnia	-	(-)
2007–2008	WA Tlemcen	-	(-)
2010–2011	IRB Maghnia	-	(-)
2011–2013	ES Sétif	45	(2)
2014–2016	JS Saoura	30	(3)
2016–	CRB Aïn Fakroun	-	(-)
- * Club domestic league appearances and goals as of 09:00, November 11, 2018 (UTC)

Mohamed El Amine Tiouli (born July 8, 1987) is an Algerian football player. He currently plays for CRB Aïn Fakroun in the Ligue Nationale du Football Amateur, the Algerian third division.

== Club career ==
On July 11, 2011, Tiouli signed a two-year contract with ES Sétif. On September 20, 2011, he made his debut as a starter in the second round match of the 2011–12 Algerian Ligue Professionnelle 1 against MC Alger.

== Honours ==
- Won the Algerian Cup once with ES Sétif in 2012
- Won the Algerian Cup twice with ES Sétif in 2011–12 and 2012-13 season
