= Bart Wilmssen =

Belgian footballer

Personal information
- Date of birth: 2 November 1971 (age 54)
- Position: Defender

Senior career*
Years	Team	Apps	(Gls)
1989–1993	Lierse		
1993–1998	Westerlo		
1998–1999	Dessel Sport		
1999–2003	Zwarte Leeuw		

Managerial career
- 2007–2009: Sint-Lenaarts
- 2009–2010: Duffel
- 2010–2011: Hoogstraten
- 2011–2012: Royal Antwerp
- 2012–2014: Club Brugge B
- 2014–2015: Dessel Sport
- 2017–2018: Hoogstraten
- * Club domestic league appearances and goals

Bart Wilmssen (born 2 November 1971) is a Belgian football defender and later manager.
