= François De Keersmaecker =

Belgian football lawyer and sports delegate

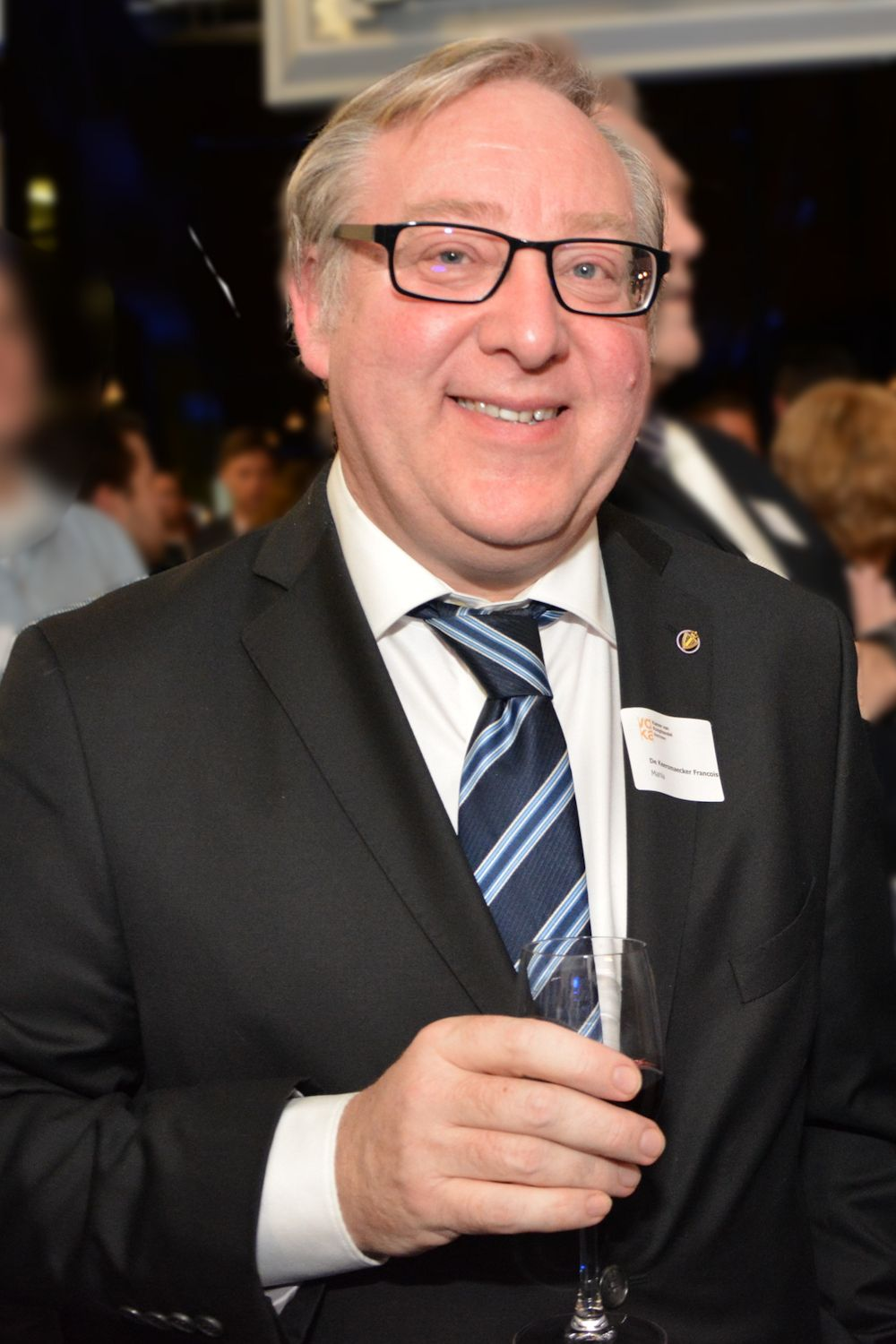
- Born: 12 April 1958 (age 67); Willebroek, Belgium
- Occupation(s): Lawyer, Sports delegate

François De Keersmaecker (born 12 April 1958 in Willebroek) was the president of the Royal Belgian Football Association (URBSFA/KBVB) from 24 June 2006 until 24 June 2017. In that function he has been actively committed in the candidacy of Belgium and the Netherlands as host countries for the 2018 FIFA World Cup.

François De Keersmaecker is a law graduate and he is a lawyer in Mechelen.

Apart from being the Belgian Football Association president he is also member of the Council for Marketing and Television from the FIFA since 1 July 2007 and second vice-president from the Juridical Commission of the UEFA since 1 July 2007. Earlier functions that François De Keersmaecker carried in the Belgian FA were president of the Provincial Committee from Antwerp from 12 December 1987, till 22 August 1996, member of the Sports Committee from 12 September 1986, until 11 December 1987, member of the Provincial Committee from Antwerp from 25 October 1985, till 11 September 1986 and referee in the Provincial Referee Commission from Antwerp from 24 November 1980, till 24 October 1985.

De Keersmaecker is a son-in-law of former Association President Louis Wouters who on his turn was also a son-in-law of Oscar Vankesbeeck, equally a former Association President.
