= Dante Brogno =

Belgian football manager

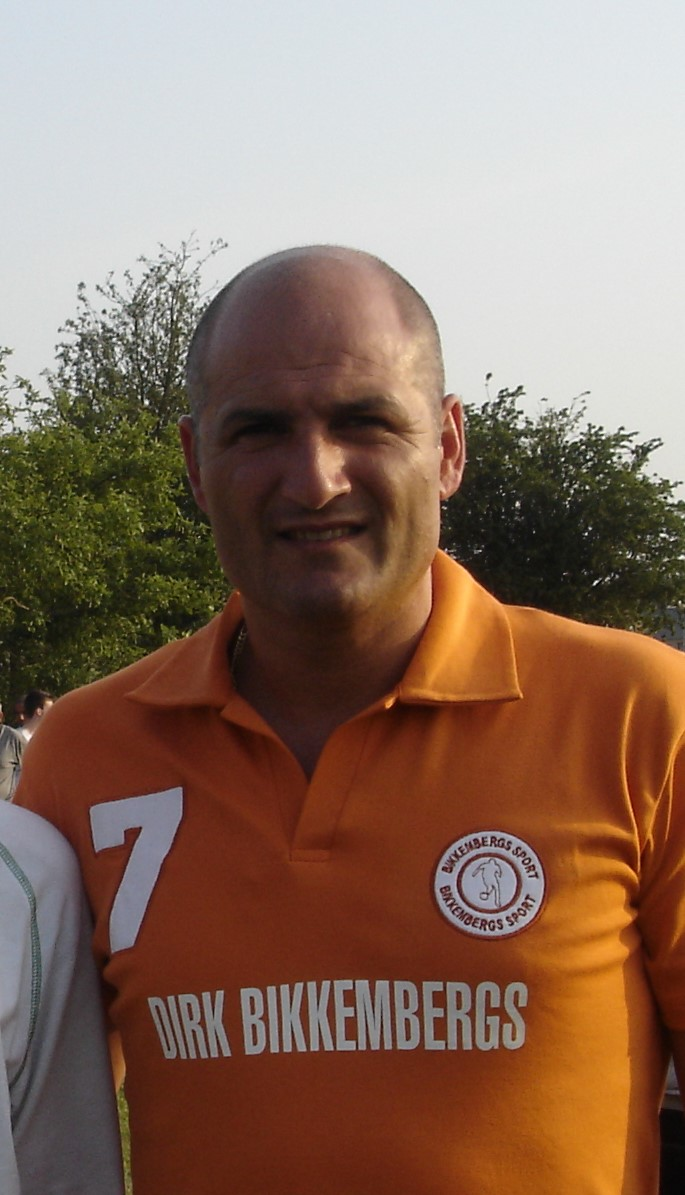

Personal information
- Date of birth: 2 May 1966 (age 60)
- Place of birth: Charleroi, Belgium
- Height: 1.77 m (5 ft 10 in)
- Position: Forward

Team information
- Current team: RAEC Mons (manager)

Senior career*
Years	Team	Apps	(Gls)
1986–2001	Charleroi	389	(108)

Managerial career
- 2001–2002: Charleroi (assistant)
- 2002–2003: Charleroi
- 2003–2007: Charleroi (assistant)
- 2007–2009: Charleroi (youth)
- 2009–2010: Olympic Charleroi
- 2010–2012: Union Saint-Gilloise
- 2012–2014: AFC Tubize
- 2015–2016: La Louvière Centre
- 2016–2019: RFC Liège
- 2019–2022: Francs Borains
- 2022–2024: RAEC Mons
- * Club domestic league appearances and goals

Dante Brogno (born 2 May 1966) is a Belgian former football manager and former player who manages RAEC Mons. A forward, he spent his entire playing career with Charleroi.

== Early life ==
Brogno grew up in Marchienne-au-Pont as a descendant of Calabrian immigrants. His brother Toni Brogno became a professional footballer too, as did Dantes's son Loris Brogno.

== Playing career ==
Spending fifteen years at Charleroi as a player, Brogno scored a record-setting 108 goals in 389 games. Brogno then started his managing career as assistant and later manager of that club.

He was called up to represent Belgium, but was an unused substitute against Wales in October 1997.

== Managerial career ==
In September 2022, he took over as manager of RAEC Mons. On 13 April 2024, he was brought his club promotion to Belgian National Division 1 from next season after Champions of Belgian Division 2 ACFF in 2023–24.

== Managerial statistics ==
As of match played 12 May 2024

Managerial record by team and tenure
Team	From	To	Record				
Team	From	To	P	W	D	L	Win %
RFC Liège	30 May 2016	30 June 2019	32	12	8	12	37.50
Royal Francs Borains	1 July 2019	17 January 2022	43	22	12	9	51.16
RAEC Mons	23 September 2022	29 November 2024	35	27	4	4	77.14
Total			110	61	24	25	55.45

== Honours ==
=== Player ===
Charleroi

- Belgian Cup runner-up: 1992–93

=== Manager ===
RFC Liège

- Belgian Division 2 runner-up: 2016–17, 2017–18

RAEC Mons

- Belgian Division 3: 2022–23
- Belgian Division 2: 2023–24
