= Lens Annab =

Belgian-Algerian footballer

Personal information
- Full name: Nadjem Lens Annab
- Date of birth: 20 July 1988 (age 38)
- Place of birth: Maaseik, Belgium
- Position: Midfielder

Youth career
- 1994–2007: Patro Eisden

Senior career*
Years	Team	Apps	(Gls)
2007–2008	Patro Eisden		
2008–2012	Westerlo	83	(7)
2012	ES Sétif	3	(0)
2013–2014	Lierse	7	(0)
2014–2015	ASV Geel	18	(1)
2016–2017	Thes Sport		
2017–2018	Patro Eisden		
2019–2020	Bilzerse Waltwilder		
- * Club domestic league appearances and goals as of 16:48, 4 February 2021 (UTC)

Nadjem Lens Annab (born 20 July 1988) is a Belgian-Algerian professional football player who plays as a midfielder.

== Personal ==
Born in Belgium, Annab's family is originally from Algeria. His father is an ethnic Chaoui from Merouana, while his mother is also from the Batna province. He has two brothers and a younger sister.

== Club career ==
Annab signed a contract with Westerlo in April 2008, while he was playing for Eisden Sport in the Limburg Third Division, the 7th of 8 levels in the Belgian football league system. Annab also played futsal for ZVK Eisden Dorp at that time, but quit after his surprise transfer. Lens Annab made his debut at the highest level in a 1–0 victory against Mouscron on 12 September 2009 and from then on featured regularly in the team. Following the relegation of Westerlo in 2012, Annab chose to accept an offer from ES Sétif, allowing him to move to his second home country, Algeria. On 5 August 2014 Lens Annab signed a contract with the second division team ASV Geel.
