= Bart De Roover =

Belgian footballer

Personal information
- Full name: Albert De Roover
- Date of birth: 21 August 1967 (age 59)
- Place of birth: Belgium
- Position: Defender

Senior career*
Years	Team	Apps	(Gls)
-1988	K.F.C. Zwarte Leeuw		
1988-1991	K.S.C. Lokeren Oost-Vlaanderen	75	(13)
1991-1995	K.A.A. Gent	104	(8)
1995-1997	Lierse S.K.	60	(4)
1997-1999	NAC Breda	21	(1)

International career
1997	Belgium	5	(0)

Managerial career
- 2000–2003: Wuustwezel
- 2003–2008: Cappellen
- 2008–2010: Waasland
- 2010: Zulte Waregem
- 2010–2011: Antwerp
- 2012–2015: Al Ahli U23
- 2015–2016: Lommel United
- 2017–2020: Cappellen
- 2020–2024: Lyra-Lierse Berlaar
- 2024–: Cappellen
- * Club domestic league appearances and goals

Bart De Roover (born 21 August 1967 in Belgium) is a Belgian retired footballer who now works as head coach of K. Lyra-Lierse Berlaar in his home country.

== Career ==
De Roover started his senior career with K.F.C. Zwarte Leeuw. After that, he played for K.S.C. Lokeren Oost-Vlaanderen, K.A.A. Gent, and Lierse S.K. In 1997, he signed for NAC Breda in the Dutch Eredivisie, where he made twenty-one league appearances and scored one goal.

== Honours ==
Lierse

- Belgian First Division: 1996–97
