= Abbas Bayat =

Iranian businessman, entrepreneur, industrialist

Abbas Bayat (Persian: عباس بيات, born 14 July 1947 in Tehran) is an Iranian businessman, entrepreneur and industriaist. He was the chairman of Belgian football club Charleroi.
