= Royal Charleroi SC =

Belgian professional football club

Sporting Charleroi
- Full name: Royal Charleroi Sporting Club
- Nicknames: Les Zèbres (The Zebras), Les Carolos
- Founded: 1 January 1904; 122 years ago
- Ground: Stade du Pays de Charleroi
- Capacity: 15,000
- Chairman: Fabien Debecq
- Managing Director: Mehdi Bayat
- Head coach: Mario Kohnen
- League: Belgian Pro League
- 2025–26: Belgian Pro League, 9th of 16
- Website: www.sporting-charleroi.be
Home colours	Away colours

Royal Charleroi Sporting Club, often simply known as Charleroi or Sporting Charleroi, is a Belgian professional football club based in the city of Charleroi, in the province of Hainaut. Charleroi plays in the Belgian Pro League. Their current spell at the highest level in Belgian football started in the 2012–13 season. Charleroi was founded in 1904 and they first reached the first division in 1947–48. Their highest finish was runner-up in the 1968–69 season. They have also twice reached the Belgian Cup final, losing in 1977–78 to Beveren and in 1992–93 to Standard Liège.

Sporting Charleroi have a long-standing rivalry with their crosstown rival ROC de Charleroi-Marchienne, currently playing in the third division. Charleroi play their home matches at the Stade du Pays de Charleroi, which was refurbished for the UEFA Euro 2000. The stadium hosted 3 group stage games in the Euro 2000 among which the 1–0 victory of England against Germany. Charleroi have been recruiting several French players in recent years, including Michaël Ciani, Cyril Théréau and goalkeeper Bertrand Laquait.

== History ==
Charleroi Sporting Club was founded in 1904 and they received the matricule n°22. Twenty years after their foundation, they qualified to play in the Promotion (then the second level in Belgian football) and in 1929, the club changed its name to Royal Charleroi Sporting Club. Rivals from Olympic Charleroi were playing in the first division in the late 1930s and the 1940s, while Sporting Charleroi was playing one level down, until they promoted in 1947. In 1949, Sporting Charleroi finished 4th (2 points behind Standard Liège) whereas Olympic Charleroi was 14th. But Olympic took the lead again until 1955 and their relegation to the second division. At the end of the 1956–57 season, Olympic Charleroi had promoted to the first division but Sporting Charleroi finished last in the first division and was thus relegated to the second division. A spell of 9 seasons in the second division followed and in 1966–67 Sporting Charleroi was back at the top level. They finished at the second place in 1968–69 5 points behind Standard Liège but within two years they were relegated again.

In 1974 the first division was changing from 16 to 20 teams and Sporting Charleroi was chosen to play at the top level. Olympic Charleroi promoted too as they had won the second division right before but they remained at the top level for just one season. Sporting underwent a new relegation in 1979–80 (17th on 18) but was back five years later. Their best result since then in the first division is a 4th place in 1993–94. In September 2005, the G-14 took FIFA to court over the eight-month injury incurred by Abdelmajid Oulmers whilst on international duty with Morocco.

== Colours and badge ==
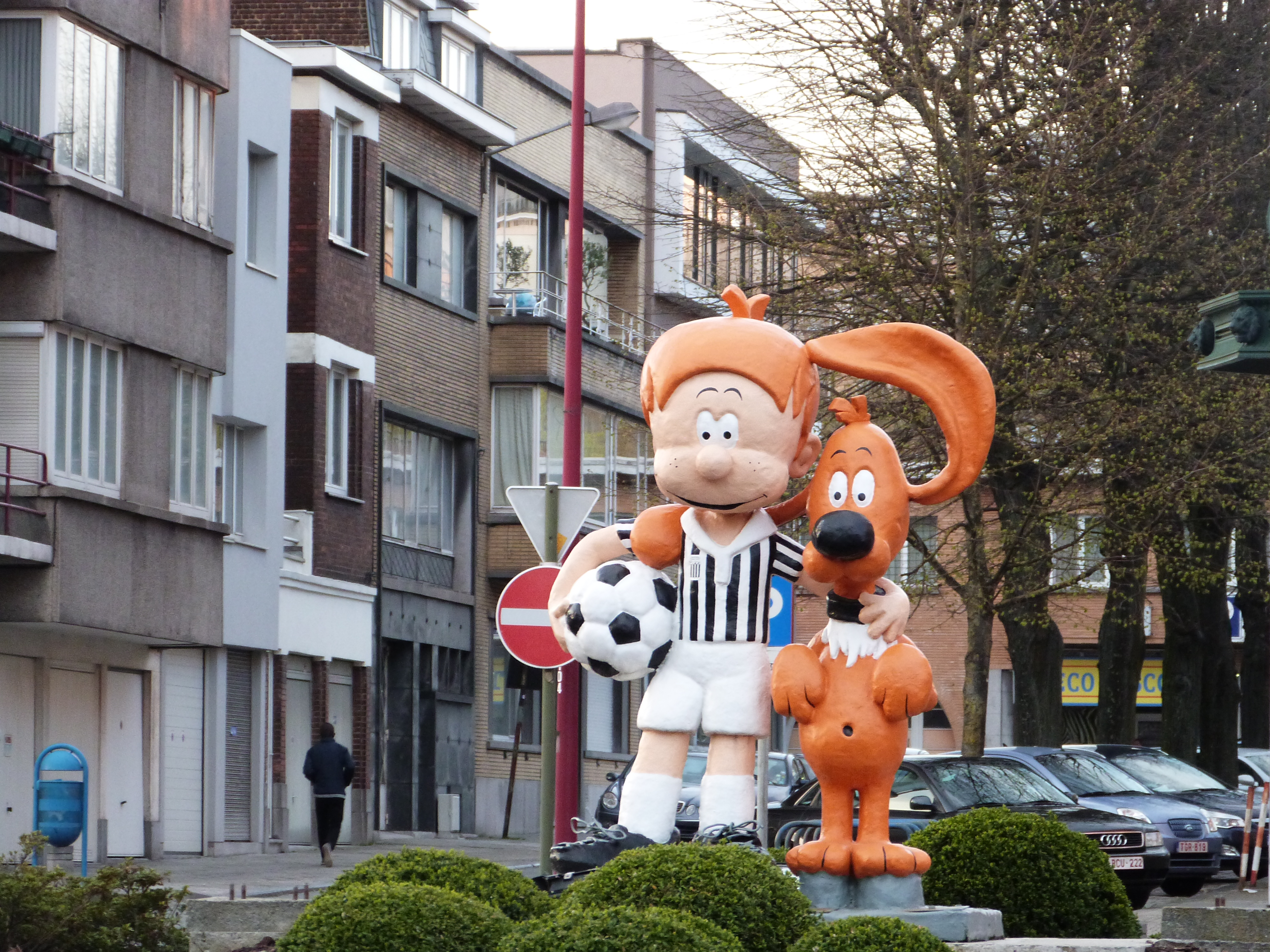
Characters Boule et Bill as Charleroi-supporters

The colours of Charleroi are black and white with a shirt generally striped, which led to the team being nicknamed The Zebras.

== Stadium ==
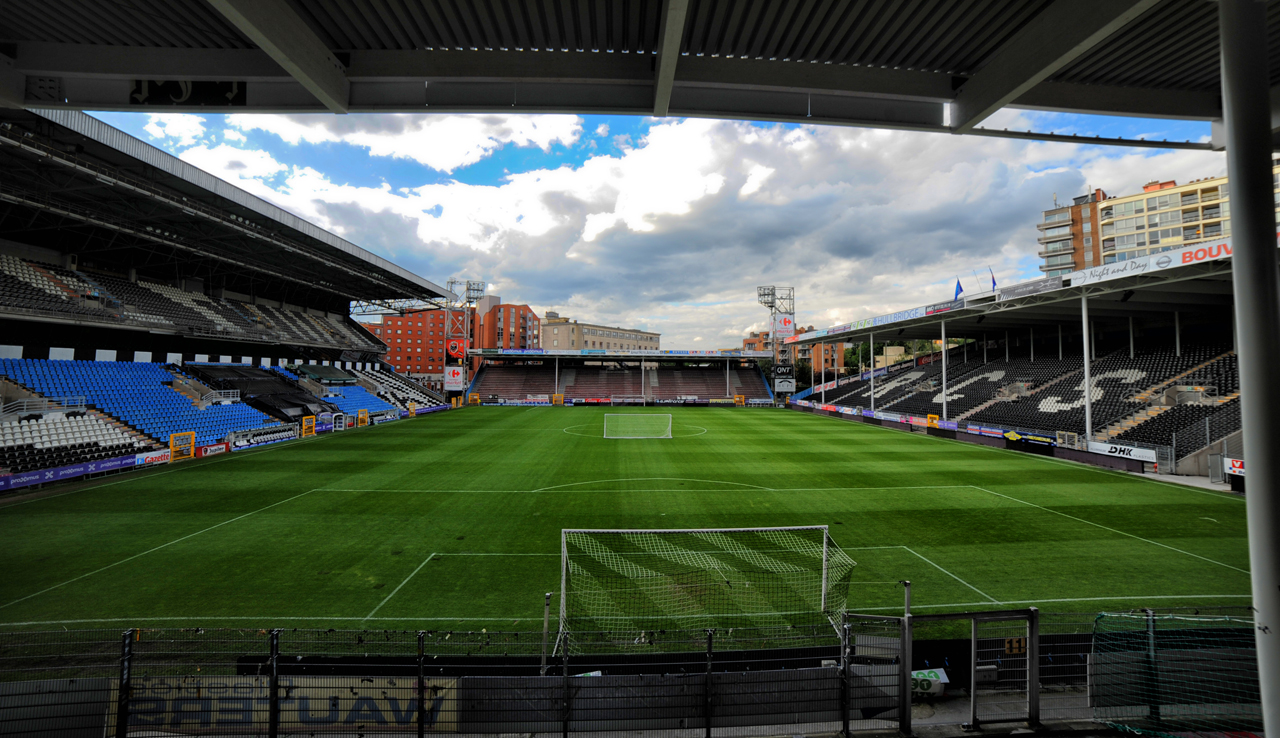
Stade du Pays de Charleroi

The current ground was baptized in 1939 with a match Sporting-Union du Centre and it was located near the coal mine named Mambourg. In 1985 the stadium was slightly modernized as the club had qualified for the first division. It was then heavily renewed in the late 1990s in view of the 2000 European Football Championship. The name changed on 24 May 1999 from Stade du Mambourg to Stade du Pays de Charleroi. During the tournament, the full capacity of the stadium was up to 30,000 seats. The Stade du Pays de Charleroi hosted notably the match between Germany and England. The highest stand was eventually reduced and the capacity is now 15,000.

== Honours ==
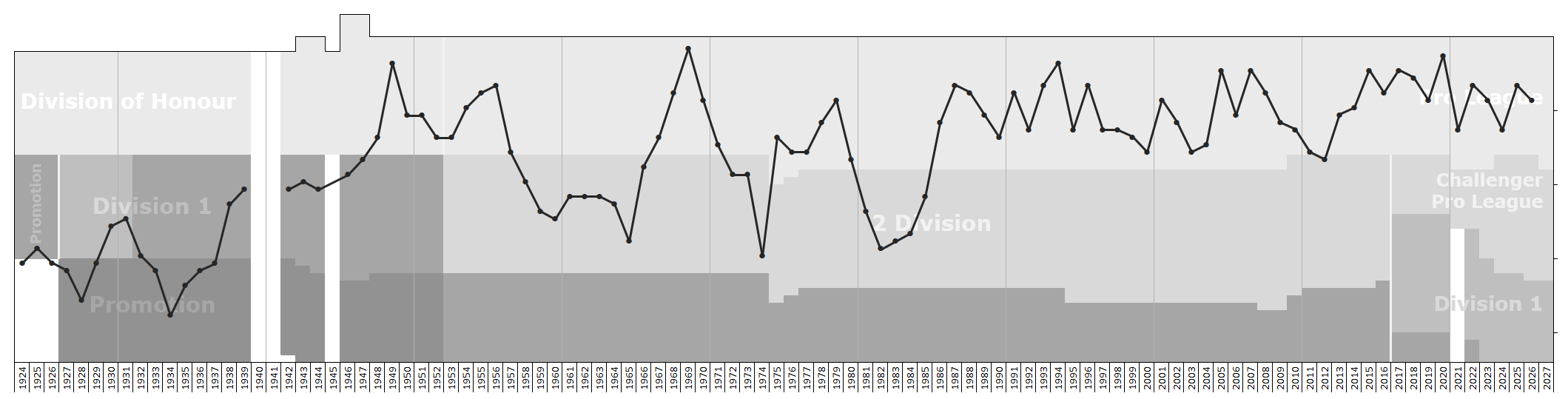
Historical chart of Charleroi SC league performance

- Belgian First Division
  - Runners-up: 1968–69
- Belgian Second Division
  - Winners: 1946–47, 2011–12
  - Runners-up: 1965–66
- Belgian Second Division play-offs
  - Winners: 1985
- Belgian Cup
  - Runners-up: 1977–78, 1992–93

== European record ==
=== UEFA club competition record ===
Correct as of May 2026

Competition	Played	W	D	L	GF	GA
UEFA Cup	2	1	0	1	2	3
UEFA Intertoto Cup	10	3	3	4	11	11
Inter-Cities Fairs Cup	4	3	0	1	8	5
UEFA Europa League	6	3	0	3	12	9
UEFA Conference League	2	0	1	1	1	2
TOTAL	24	10	4	10	34	31

=== Matches ===
Match won	Match drawn	Match lost

Season	Competition	Round	Club	Home	Away	Aggregate
1969–70	Inter-Cities Fairs Cup	1R	(Croatia) Zagreb	2–1	3–1	5–2
1969–70	Inter-Cities Fairs Cup	2R	(France) FC Rouen	3–1	0–2	3–3 (a)
1994–95	UEFA Cup	1R	(Romania) Rapid București	2–1	0–2	2–3
1995	UEFA Intertoto Cup	Group 10	(Israel) Beitar Jerusalem	—N/a	1–0	3rd
1995	UEFA Intertoto Cup	Group 10	(Turkey) Bursaspor	0–2	—N/a	3rd
1995	UEFA Intertoto Cup	Group 10	(Slovakia) FC Košice	—N/a	2–3	3rd
1995	UEFA Intertoto Cup	Group 10	(England) Wimbledon	3–0	—N/a	3rd
1996	UEFA Intertoto Cup	Group 4	(Denmark) Silkeborg IF	2–4	—N/a	3rd
1996	UEFA Intertoto Cup	Group 4	(Wales) Conwy United	—N/a	0–0	3rd
1996	UEFA Intertoto Cup	Group 4	(Poland) Zagłębie Lubin	0–0	—N/a	3rd
1996	UEFA Intertoto Cup	Group 4	(Austria) SV Ried	—N/a	3–1	3rd
2005	UEFA Intertoto Cup	2R	(Finland) Tampere United	0–0	0–1	0–1
2015–16	UEFA Europa League	2Q	(Israel) Beitar Jerusalem	5–1	4–1	9–2
2015–16	UEFA Europa League	3Q	(Ukraine) Zorya Luhansk	0–2	0–3	0–5
2020–21	UEFA Europa League	3Q	(Serbia) Partizan	2–1 (aet)	—N/a	—N/a
2020–21	UEFA Europa League	PO	(Poland) Lech Poznań	1–2	—N/a	—N/a
2025–26	UEFA Conference League	2Q	(Sweden) Hammarby IF	1–2 (aet)	0–0	1–2

== Current squad ==
As of 12 September 2026

Note: Flags indicate national team as defined under FIFA eligibility rules; some limited exceptions apply. Players may hold more than one non-FIFA nationality.

No.	Pos.	Nation	Player
1	GK	BEL	Martin Delavallée
2	DF	ENG	Triston Rowe (on loan from Aston Villa U21)
3	DF	ALG	Kevin Van Den Kerkhof
4	DF	SYR	Aiham Ousou (captain)
6	MF	MAR	Amine Boukamir
8	MF	NOR	Jakob Romsaas
9	FW	GAM	Adama Bojang (on loan from Reims)
13	FW	JPN	Gaku Nawata (on loan from Gamba Osaka)
14	MF	GER	Patrick Pflücke
16	GK	BEL	Arthur Cremer
17	FW	BEL	Antoine Bernier
18	MF	MAR	Yassine Khalifi
19	MF	CIV	Isaac Cissé

No.	Pos.	Nation	Player
20	FW	CGO	Freddy Mbemba
21	FW	FRA	Aurélien Scheidler
23	MF	FRA	Boubakar Dembaga
24	DF	BEL	Mardochee Nzita
25	MF	BEL	Antoine Colassin
30	GK	CIV	Mohamed Koné
33	DF	BEL	Noah Solheid
44	DF	FRA	Massamba Sow
51	MF	BEL	Mory Kera
54	DF	BEL	Naël Piron
65	DF	BEL	Rafaël Teugels
95	DF	MLI	Cheick Keita

=== On loan ===
Note: Flags indicate national team as defined under FIFA eligibility rules; some limited exceptions apply. Players may hold more than one non-FIFA nationality.

No.	Pos.	Nation	Player
—	DF	MAR	Mehdi Boukamir (at RAAL La Louvière until 30 June 2027)
—	FW	GHA	Raymond Asante (at Francs Borains until 30 June 2027)

No.	Pos.	Nation	Player
—	FW	CIV	Severin Nioule (at Francs Borains until 30 June 2027)
—	FW	BEL	Anthony Descotte (at Fortuna Sittard until 30 June 2027)

=== Retired numbers ===
11 – Has been retired in honor of club legend Dante Brogno since July 2001, his retirement.

=== Zebra Elites (Second team) ===
As of 6 February 2026

Note: Flags indicate national team as defined under FIFA eligibility rules; some limited exceptions apply. Players may hold more than one non-FIFA nationality.

No.	Pos.	Nation	Player
41	FW	BEL	Léandro Diaz
42	MF	BEL	Thomas Lutte
45	MF	FRA	Yoann Cissé
46	MF	BEL	Tristan Hermans
48	GK	BEL	Arthur Mathot
49	FW	BEL	Yoan Apo
53	MF	BEL	Sami Kolgjini
54	DF	BEL	Naël Piron
57	DF	BEL	Dylan Deves
58	GK	BEL	Ugo Decerf
59	DF	BEL	Yann Sikorski

No.	Pos.	Nation	Player
62	FW	BEL	Nathan Okumu Monkoy
65	DF	BEL	Rafaël Teugels
66	MF	BEL	Oscar Latteur
77	MF	BEL	Matteo Noto
81	DF	MAR	Naïm Marzouk
82	MF	BEL	Sacha Miantezila
83	FW	BEL	Ahmed Mulumba
88	GK	FRA	Lucas Degeye
92	DF	FRA	Djulys Gomis
93	DF	FRA	Ryan George

== Club officials ==
Position	Staff
President	(Belgium) Fabien Debecq
Chief commercial officer	(Belgium) Walter Chardon
Managing director	(France) Mehdi Bayat
Interim Head coach	(Belgium) Mario Kohnen
Assistant coach	(Belgium) Rudi Cossey (Belgium) Frank Defays
Goalkeeper coach	(France) Cédric Berthelin
Fitness coach	(Belgium) Frédéric Renotte
Strength & conditioning coach	(Belgium) Antoine Huguenot (Belgium) Sébastien Delacroix
Video analyst	(Belgium) Amaury Smits
Data analyst	(Belgium) Pierre Neuchâteau
Head physio	(Belgium) Benjamin Tubiermont
Doctor	(Belgium) Dr.Clément Lepeuple
Physiotherapist	(Belgium) Lilian Scarlata (Belgium) Tristan Blyckaerts (Belgium) Frédéric Vanbelle
Masseur	(Belgium) Frédéric Chandelle
Head of education	(Belgium) Christophe Dessy
Kitman	(Belgium) Baptiste Collier
Delegate	(Belgium) Arnaud Charlier
Performance Manager	(Belgium) Rudger Van Snick

== Coaches ==
- (Czechoslovakia) Jiří Sobotka (1968–69)
- (Austria) Lukas Aurednik (1969–71)
- (Belgium) Léopold Anoul (1974–75)
- (Belgium) Jean-Paul Colonval (1975–76)
- (Belgium) Aimé Anthuenis (1 July 1987 – 30 June 1989)
- (Belgium) Georges Heylens (1990–92)
- (Croatia) Luka Peruzović (1 July 1991 – 30 June 1992)
- (Belgium) Robert Waseige (1 July 1992 – 30 June 1994)
- (Belgium) Georges Leekens (1 July 1994 – 30 July 1995)
- (Croatia) Luka Peruzović (1 August 1995 – 30 June 1997)
- (Belgium) Robert Waseige (1 July 1997 – 1999)
- (Croatia) Luka Peruzović (1999 – 8 December 1999)
- (Belgium) Raymond Mommens (1999–00)
- (Belgium) Manu Ferrera (2000)
- (Belgium) Enzo Scifo (2001–02)
- (Belgium) Dante Brogno (November 2002 – 3 October 2003)
- (Belgium) Robert Waseige (15 October 2003 – 26 April 2004)
- (Belgium) Jacky Mathijssen (26 April 2004 – 30 June 2007)
- (Belgium) Philippe Vande Walle (1 July 2007 – 10 December 2007)
- (Belgium) Thierry Siquet (11 December 2007 – 9 December 2008)
- (Scotland) John Collins (15 December 2008 – 30 June 2009)
- (Belgium) Stéphane Demol (2009)
- (Belgium) Jacky Mathijssen (2009)
- (Belgium) Stéphane Demol (1 July 2009 – 1 November 2009)
- (Scotland) Tommy Craig (20 November 2009 – 14 April 2010)
- (Belgium) Jacky Mathijssen (1 July 2010 – 20 September 2010)
- (Hungary) Csaba László (23 September 2010 – 17 March 2011)
- (Hungary) Zoltan Kovacs (interim) (24 March 2011 – 4 April 2011)
- (Croatia) Luka Peruzović (4 April 2011 – 30 June 2011)
- (Belgium) Jos Daerden (1 July 2011 – 26 September 2011)
- (Hungary) Tibor Balogh (27 September 2011 – 22 February 2012)
- (Belgium) Mario Notaro (interim) (23 February 2012 – 5 March 2012)
- (Netherlands) Dennis van Wijk (5 March 2012 – 12 June 2012)
- (Belgium) Yannick Ferrera (14 July 2012 – 14 February 2013)
- (Croatia) Luka Peruzović (interim) (14 February 2013 – 13 March 2013)
- (Belgium) Mario Notaro (interim) (March 2013 – 13 April 2013)
- (Belgium) Felice Mazzu (1 June 2013 – 3 June 2019)
- (France) Karim Belhocine (1 July 2019 –30 June 2021)
- (Belgium) Edward Still (1 July 2021 -22 October 2022)
