= List of Belgian football transfers summer 2010 =

This is a list of Belgian football transfers for the 2010 summer transfer window. Only transfers involving a team from the Jupiler League are listed.

The summer transfer window will open on 1 July 2010, although some transfers took place prior to that date. Players without a club may join one at any time, either during or in between transfer windows. The transfer window ends on 31 August 2010, although a few completed transfers could be announced a few days later.

== Sorted by date ==
=== February 2010 ===
Date	Name	Moving from	Moving to	Fee
9 February 2010	(Serbia) Milan Jovanović	Standard Liège	(England) Liverpool	Free

=== March 2010 ===
Date	Name	Moving from	Moving to	Fee
12 March 2010	Jimmy Hempte	Kortrijk	(Netherlands) Roda JC	Free
29 March 2010	(Argentina) Nicolás Frutos	Anderlecht	Retired	Released

=== April 2010 ===
Date	Name	Moving from	Moving to	Fee
1 April 2010	Jeroen Mellemans	Mechelen	Oosterzonen	Free
5 April 2010	Jonathan Wilmet	Sint-Truiden	Mechelen	Free
8 April 2010	(Peru) Daniel Chávez	Club Brugge	Westerlo	Undisclosed
11 April 2010	(Israel) Yoav Ziv	Lokeren	(Israel) Maccabi Tel Aviv	Undisclosed
22 April 2010	Igor de Camargo	Standard Liège	(Germany) Borussia Mönchengladbach	Undisclosed

=== May 2010 ===
Date	Name	Moving from	Moving to	Fee
3 May 2010	Seth De Witte	Lierse	Mechelen	Free
5 May 2010	(France) Grégory Christ	Charleroi	Sint-Truiden	Undisclosed
11 May 2010	(Netherlands) Jeremy Bokila	(Netherlands) Apeldoorn	Zulte Waregem	Free
11 May 2010	(Algeria) Adlène Guedioura	Charleroi	(England) Wolverhampton Wanderers	Undisclosed ^{1}
11 May 2010	Geoffrey Mujangi Bia	Charleroi	(England) Wolverhampton Wanderers	Loan ^{2}
12 May 2010	(France) Franck Berrier	Zulte Waregem	Standard Liège	Undisclosed
13 May 2010	(Czech Republic) Daniel Zítka	Anderlecht	(Czech Republic) Sparta Prague	Released
14 May 2010	(Paraguay) Antolin Alcaraz	Club Brugge	(England) Wigan Athletic	Free
14 May 2010	Jelle Van Damme	Anderlecht	(England) Wolverhampton Wanderers	€3 000 000
14 May 2010	(Burundi) Selemani Ndikumana	Lierse	Free Agent	Released
14 May 2010	(Egypt) Sherif El Baily	Lierse	Free Agent	Released
17 May 2010	(France) Baptiste Martin	(France) Auxerre	Kortrijk	Undisclosed
18 May 2010	Zinou Chergui	KVSK United	Mechelen	Undisclosed
18 May 2010	Ilombe Mboyo	Charleroi	Kortrijk	Loan
19 May 2010	(Ivory Coast) Moussa Traoré	Standard Liège	Zulte Waregem	Loan
20 May 2010	Olivier Mukendi	Anderlecht	Cercle Brugge	Loan ^{3}
20 May 2010	Dennis Praet	Genk	Anderlecht	Undisclosed
20 May 2010	(Brazil) Reynaldo	Anderlecht	Cercle Brugge	Loan ^{3}
21 May 2010	(Netherlands) Arnold Kruiswijk	Anderlecht	(Netherlands) Heerenveen	Undisclosed ^{4}
21 May 2010	(Croatia) Ivan Leko	Germinal Beerschot	Lokeren	Undisclosed ^{5}
21 May 2010	Koen Persoons	Mechelen	Lokeren	Undisclosed
22 May 2010	(Kenya) Ajub Masika	Germinal Beerschot	Genk	Undisclosed
23 May 2010	(Turkey) Onur Kaya	(Netherlands) Vitesse Arnhem	Charleroi	Undisclosed
25 May 2010	(Slovenia) Matija Škarabot	(Slovenia) Gorica	Gent	Undisclosed
25 May 2010	(Morocco) Chemcedine El Araichi	(Hungary) Győr	Kortrijk	Undisclosed ^{6}
25 May 2010	Glenn Verbauwhede	Club Brugge	Kortrijk	Loan ^{7}
26 May 2010	(Morocco) Sofian Benzouien	Eupen	(Luxembourg) F91 Dudelange	Undisclosed
29 May 2010	Ivan Yagan	WS Woluwe	Lokeren	Free
30 May 2010	(Croatia) Mario Carević	Lokeren	Kortrijk	Undisclosed

- ^{1} Guedioura was already on loan to Wolverhampton since the winter of 2009-2010, but Wolverhampton chose to use the option to buy in the contract.
- ^{2} Mujangi Bia was already on loan to Wolverhampton since the winter of 2009-2010. This loan contract ended, but Wolverhampton and Charleroi agreed to renew the loan for another season.
- ^{3} Both Mukendi and Reynaldo were already on loan to Cercle. The loan ended, but was extended for one more season.
- ^{4} Kruiswijk returned from a loan spell at Roda JC, but was immediately sold to Heerenveen.
- ^{5} Leko was already on loan from Germinal Beerschot for half a season, however both clubs agreed upon a full transfer.
- ^{6} El Araichi was already on loan to Kortrijk. The loan ended, but El Araichi was now signed on a full contract.
- ^{7} Verbauwhede was already on loan to Kortrijk. The loan ended, but was extended for one more season.

=== End of 2009-10 season ===
After the end of the 2009-10 season, several players have returned from loan to another club or did not have had their contracts extended. They are listed here when the date is otherwise not specified. For a list of transfers where the returned players are also mentioned, see.

Date	Name	Moving from	Moving to	Fee
End of 2009-10 season	(Paraguay) Juan Aguilar	Eupen	(Switzerland) Bellinzona	Loan Return
End of 2009-10 season	(Gabon) Willy Aubameyang	Eupen	(Italy) AC Milan	Loan Return
End of 2009-10 season	Christian Benteke	Kortrijk	Standard Liège	Loan Return
End of 2009-10 season	(France) Cédric Bétrémieux	OH Leuven	Kortrijk	Loan Return
End of 2009-10 season	(Russia) Dmitri Bulykin	(Germany) Fortuna Düsseldorf	Anderlecht	Loan Return
End of 2009-10 season	Michaël Cordier	Olympic Charleroi	Anderlecht	Loan Return
End of 2009-10 season	(Serbia) Dušan Đokić	(China) Chongqing Lifan	Club Brugge	Loan Return
End of 2009-10 season	Kevin Goeman	Zulte Waregem	(France) Lens	Loan Return
End of 2009-10 season	Grégory Grisez	Boussu Dour Borinage	Charleroi	Loan Return
End of 2009-10 season	Edouard Kabamba	Eupen	Standard Liège	Loan Return
End of 2009-10 season	(Senegal) Moussa Koita	Charleroi	Genk	Loan Return
End of 2009-10 season	(Argentina) Hernán Losada	(Netherlands) Heerenveen	Anderlecht	Loan Return
End of 2009-10 season	(Denmark) Emil Lyng	Zulte Waregem	(France) Lille	Loan Return
End of 2009-10 season	(Honduras) Mario Martínez	Anderlecht	(Norway) Vålerengen	Loan Return
End of 2009-10 season	Tim Matthys	Lierse	Zulte Waregem	Loan Return
End of 2009-10 season	(France) Jonathan Mendes	Tubize	Standard Liège	Loan Return
End of 2009-10 season	(Brazil) Alex Moraes	Standard Liège	(Brazil) Apucarana	Loan Return
End of 2009-10 season	(Brazil) Orlando	Genk	Charleroi	Loan Return
End of 2009-10 season	(Finland) Berat Sadik	Zulte Waregem	(Germany) Arminia Bielefeld	Loan Return
End of 2009-10 season	Wouter Scheelen	KVSK United	Westerlo	Loan Return
End of 2009-10 season	(Cameroon) Sébastien Siani	Sint-Truiden	Anderlecht	Loan Return
End of 2009-10 season	(France) Mohamadou Sissoko	Eupen	(Italy) Udinese	Loan Return
End of 2009-10 season	(England) Paul Taylor	Charleroi	Anderlecht	Loan Return, then Released
End of 2009-10 season	David Vandenbroeck	Kortrijk	Charleroi	Loan Return
End of 2009-10 season	Lander Van Steenbrugghe	OH Leuven	Zulte Waregem	Loan Return
End of 2009-10 season	Jelle Vossen	Cercle Brugge	Genk	Loan Return
End of 2009-10 season	(Ukraine) Oleksandr Yakovenko	Westerlo	Anderlecht	Loan Return

=== June 2010 ===
Date	Name	Moving from	Moving to	Fee
1 June 2010	Geoffrey Cabeke	Brussels	Westerlo	Undisclosed
2 June 2010	Domenico Bruzzese	RFC Liège	Eupen	Undisclosed
3 June 2010	Mark Volders	Unattached	Sint-Truiden	Free
5 June 2010	Olivier Claessens	Cercle Brugge	Dender EH	Free
6 June 2010	Geoffrey Nizet	RFC Liège	Eupen	Undisclosed
7 June 2010	Kenneth Van Goethem	Mechelen	OH Leuven	Free
8 June 2010	(Argentina) Pier Barrios	(Argentina) Belgrano	Anderlecht	Loan
8 June 2010	(Argentina) Pablo Chavarría	(Argentina) Belgrano	Anderlecht	Over €1 000 000
9 June 2010	(Czech Republic) Jan Lecjaks	(Czech Republic) Plzeň	Anderlecht	Undisclosed
9 June 2010	(Iceland) Bjarni Viðarsson	Roeselare	Mechelen	Undisclosed
10 June 2010	(Switzerland) Mario Cantaluppi	Sint-Truiden	(Switzerland) Buochs (Coach)	Free
10 June 2010	(United States) Sacha Kljestan	(United States) Chivas USA	Anderlecht	Undisclosed
11 June 2010	Benjamin De Ceulaer	(Netherlands) RKC	Lokeren	Undisclosed
12 June 2010	(South Africa) Lance Davids	(South Africa) Ajax Cape Town	Lierse SK	Free
12 June 2010	Sepp De Roover	(Netherlands) Groningen	Lokeren	Undisclosed
12 June 2010	Andréa Mbuyi-Mutombo	Standard Liège	Sint-Truiden	Loan
12 June 2010	Nico van Kerckhoven	Westerlo	Retired	Released
14 June 2010	Dries Ventose	Lierse	Rupel Boom	Undisclosed
15 June 2010	Roy Meeus	Club Brugge	Dender EH	Loan
15 June 2010	(Norway) Vegard Braaten	(Norway) Tromsø	Lokeren	Undisclosed
15 June 2010	Brecht Verbrugghe	Kortrijk	Free Agent	Contract Ended
16 June 2010	(Brazil) Marcos Camozzato	Standard Liège	Club Brugge	Undisclosed + Ciman
16 June 2010	Laurent Ciman	Club Brugge	Standard Liège	Undisclosed + Camozzato ^{8}
16 June 2010	Cédric Ciza	Anderlecht	Charleroi	Loan ^{9}
16 June 2010	(France) Jonathan Delaplace	(France) ES Fréjus	Zulte Waregem	Free
16 June 2010	(Senegal) Moussa Gueye	Mons	Charleroi	Undisclosed
16 June 2010	(Senegal) Zakaria Gueye	(France) Pacy Vallée-d'Eure	Zulte Waregem	Free
16 June 2010	(Egypt) Emad Moteab	(Egypt) Al-Ahly	Standard Liège	Free
16 June 2010	(Gabon) John Tshibumbu	(France) Cannes	Charleroi	Undisclosed
17 June 2010	Cor Gillis	Mechelen	Free Agent	Released
17 June 2010	Jonas Ivens	Mechelen	(Netherlands) Groningen	Undisclosed
17 June 2010	Simon Mignolet	Sint-Truiden	(England) Sunderland	Undisclosed
17 June 2010	(Jordan) Abdallah Salim	Mechelen	Free Agent	Released
17 June 2010	Jasson Conrad	Eupen	(Netherlands) AGOVV	Free
18 June 2010	Yves Lenaerts	Club Brugge	OH Leuven	Free
18 June 2010	Tom Muyters	Sint-Truiden	Zulte Waregem	Undisclosed
18 June 2010	René Sterckx	Anderlecht	Zulte Waregem	Loan
18 June 2010	Sven van der Jeugt	Lierse	Sint-Truiden	Undisclosed ^{10}
19 June 2010	(Netherlands) Istvan Bakx	Genk	(Netherlands) Den Bosch	Loan
21 June 2010	(Israel) Rami Gershon	Standard Liège	Kortrijk	Loan
21 June 2010	(Democratic Republic of the Congo) Junior Kabananga Kalonji	(Democratic Republic of the Congo) Etancheité	Anderlecht	Free
21 June 2010	(Brazil) Fernando Canesin Matos	(Brazil) Olé Brasil	Anderlecht	Free
21 June 2010	(Brazil) Renato Neto	(Portugal) Sporting	Cercle Brugge	Loan
21 June 2010	(Portugal) Nuno Reis	(Portugal) Sporting	Cercle Brugge	Loan
22 June 2010	(France) Hans Dibi	RFC Liège	Standard Liège	Undisclosed
22 June 2010	(Switzerland) Mijat Marić	Eupen	Lokeren	Undisclosed
22 June 2010	(France) Jérémy Taravel	Zulte Waregem	Lokeren	Undisclosed
23 June 2010	Landry Mulemo	Standard Liège	(Turkey) Bucaspor	Free
23 June 2010	(Croatia) Alen Pamić	(Croatia) Rijeka	Standard Liège	Undisclosed
23 June 2010	(Bosnia and Herzegovina) Ervin Zukanović	Dender EH	Eupen	Undisclosed
25 June 2010	(Senegal) Pape Abdou Camara	Standard Liège	Sint-Truiden	Undisclosed
25 June 2010	(Israel) Eytan Tibi	(Israel) Beitar Jerusalem	Charleroi	Undisclosed
25 June 2010	David Vandenbroeck	Charleroi	Zulte Waregem	Undisclosed
26 June 2010	Joeri Dequevy	Roeselare	Lierse	Undisclosed
29 June 2010	Jeroen Appeltans	Sint-Truiden	Tienen	Loan
29 June 2010	Luca Bruno	Sint-Truiden	Dessel	Free
29 June 2010	Issame Charaï	Sint-Truiden	Free Agent	Released
30 June 2010	(France) Youssef Sekour	(France) Sedan	Lierse	Free

- ^{8} Ciman was on loan to Kortrijk. The loan ended, but he was sold to Standard Liège.
- ^{9} Ciza was already on loan to Charleroi. The loan was extended for one more season.
- ^{10} Van der Jeugt was on loan to RFC Liège, the loan ended but instead of returning he was immediately sold to Sint-Truiden.

=== July 2010 ===
Date	Name	Moving from	Moving to	Fee
1 July 2010	Brecht Capon	Club Brugge	Kortrijk	Undisclosed
1 July 2010	(Israel) Avi Strool	Lokeren	(Israel) Maccabi Tel Aviv	Undisclosed
1 July 2010	(Ivory Coast) Soumahoro Yaya	(Thailand) Muangthong United	Gent	Undisclosed
2 July 2010	(Ghana) Daniel Opare	(Spain) Real Madrid Castilla	Standard Liège	Undisclosed ^{11}
3 July 2010	Kris de Wree	(Netherlands) Roda	Lierse	Undisclosed
3 July 2010	Olivier Doll	Lokeren	Retired	Released
5 July 2010	(Bosnia and Herzegovina) Boris Pandža	(Croatia) Hajduk Split	Mechelen	Undisclosed
6 July 2010	(Japan) Eiji Kawashima	(Japan) Kawasaki Frontale	Lierse	Undisclosed
7 July 2010	(Brazil) Jefferson	(Italy) Fiorentina	Eupen	Loan
8 July 2010	(Israel) Shlomi Arbeitman	(Israel) Maccabi Haifa	Gent	Undisclosed
9 July 2010	(Serbia) Stefan Šćepović	(Serbia) OFK Beograd	Club Brugge	Undisclosed ^{12}
12 July 2010	(France) Wilfried Dalmat	Standard Liège	Club Brugge	Undisclosed
13 July 2010	(Dominican Republic) José Espinal	(Italy) Cesena	Eupen	Undisclosed ^{13}
13 July 2010	Olivier Werner	Brussels	Eupen	Undisclosed
14 July 2010	(Brazil) Danilo Sousa Campos	(Netherlands) Ajax	Standard Liège	Undisclosed
14 July 2010	Sven De Rechter	Club Brugge	Roeselare	Undisclosed
14 July 2010	Cédric Guiro	Club Brugge	Roeselare	Undisclosed
14 July 2010	Masis Voskanian	Club Brugge	Roeselare	Undisclosed
15 July 2010	Thomas De Corte	Lierse	Antwerp	Free
15 July 2010	(France) Mourad Satli	Charleroi	Boussu	Loan
18 July 2010	(Central African Republic) Habib Habibou	Charleroi	Zulte Waregem	Undisclosed
20 July 2010	Carlo Evertz	Eupen	Sint-Truiden	Undisclosed
22 July 2010	Naïm Aarab	(Greece) AEL	Charleroi	Undisclosed
22 July 2010	(South Africa) Elrio van Heerden	(Turkey) Sivasspor	Westerlo	Undisclosed
23 July 2010	(Togo) Adékambi Olufadé	Gent	Charleroi	Free ^{14}
23 July 2010	(Ghana) William Owusu	(Portugal) Sporting	Cercle Brugge	Loan
24 July 2010	Jérémy De Vriendt	Mechelen	(Netherlands) NEC	Undisclosed
26 July 2010	(Uruguay) Gary Kagelmacher	(Spain) Real Madrid Castilla	Germinal Beerschot	Undisclosed
29 July 2010	(Argentina) Hernán Losada	Anderlecht	Charleroi	Loan ^{15}
29 July 2010	(Democratic Republic of the Congo) Dieumerci Mbokani	Standard Liège	(France) AS Monaco	Around €6 500 000
29 July 2010	(Zambia) Lamisha Musonda	Free Agent	Anderlecht	Undisclosed
29 July 2010	(Zambia) Tika Musonda	Free Agent	Anderlecht	Undisclosed
30 July 2010	Christian Brüls	(Netherlands) MVV	Westerlo	Undisclosed
30 July 2010	Tom De Mul	(Spain) Sevilla	Standard Liège	Loan
30 July 2010	Luigi Pieroni	Gent	Standard Liège	Free ^{16}
30 July 2010	(Venezuela) Roberto Rosales	Gent	(Netherlands) Twente	Undisclosed
30 July 2010	(Brazil) Cleber Sonda	Club Brugge	Roeselare	Loan
31 July 2010	Bart Buysse	Zulte Waregem	(Netherlands) Twente	Undisclosed

- ^{11} Capon was already on loan to Kortrijk. This loan ended, but now he was sold.
- ^{12} Šćepović was on loan to Sampdoria, now sold to Brugge.
- ^{13} Espinal was on loan to Giacomense, now sold to Eupen.
- ^{14} Gent and Olufadé agreed to terminate the contract just before the start of the season. Olufadé immediately signed for Charleroi, who thus did not have to pay a transfer fee.
- ^{15} Losada was on loan to Heerenveen, now loaned to Charleroi.
- ^{16} Gent and Pieroni agreed to terminate the contract. Pieroni then signed for Standard, who thus did not have to pay a transfer fee.

=== August 2010 ===
Date	Name	Moving from	Moving to	Fee
3 August 2010	(Russia) Dmitri Bulykin	Anderlecht	(Netherlands) Den Haag	Loan
3 August 2010	Tom Caluwé	(Qatar) Al-Wakrah	Sint-Truiden	Undisclosed
3 August 2010	(France) Rémi Maréval	(France) Nantes	Zulte Waregem	Free
3 August 2010	Anthony Van Loo	Roeselare	Mechelen	Free
4 August 2010	Eric Deflandre	Lierse	RFC Liège	Released
5 August 2010	(Hungary) Balázs Tóth	Genk	(Netherlands) Venlo	Loan
10 August 2010	Thomas Chatelle	Anderlecht	(Netherlands) NEC Nijmegen	Loan
10 August 2010	Cédric Ciza	Charleroi	Visé	Loan
10 August 2010	(Nigeria) John Ugochukwu	(Slovenia) Drava Ptuj	Eupen	Undisclosed
10 August 2010	Davino Verhulst	Genk	(Netherlands) Willem II	Loan
11 August 2010	Tim Matthys	Zulte Waregem	Mons	Free ^{17}
12 August 2010	(Serbia) Dušan Đokić	Club Brugge	(Poland) Zagłębie Lubin	Undisclosed
13 August 2010	(South Africa) Daylon Claasen	(Netherlands) Jong Ajax	Lierse	Undisclosed
13 August 2010	(Bosnia and Herzegovina) Adnan Čustović	Gent	Germinal Beerschot	Undisclosed
13 August 2010	(France) Benjamin Nicaise	Standard Liège	Lierse	Undisclosed
19 August 2010	(Guinea) Ibrahima Camara	(France) Le Mans	Eupen	Undisclosed
19 August 2010	(Brazil) Paulo Henrique	(Brazil) Palmeiras	Westerlo	Loan
19 August 2010	(Algeria) Yacine Hima	(Switzerland) Bellinzona	Eupen	Undisclosed
20 August 2010	(Canada) Michael Klukowski	Club Brugge	(Turkey) Ankaragücü	Undisclosed
21 August 2010	Kevin Vandenbergh	(Netherlands) Utrecht	Eupen	Undisclosed
24 August 2010	Wouter Scheelen	Westerlo	OH Leuven	Loan
24 August 2010	Wesley Sonck	Club Brugge	Lierse	Free
24 August 2010	(France) Cyril Théréau	Charleroi	(Italy) Chievo Verona	Undisclosed
25 August 2010	(Zimbabwe) Vuza Nyoni	Cercle Brugge	Germinal Beerschot	Undisclosed
26 August 2010	(Brazil) Marcus Diniz	(Italy) AC Milan	Eupen	Undisclosed
27 August 2010	(France) Chris Makiese	Zulte Waregem	(France) Laval	Undisclosed ^{18}
28 August 2010	(Brazil) Júnior Negrão	(Brazil) Figueirense	Germinal Beerschot	Undisclosed
30 August 2010	(Croatia) Mario Barić	(Croatia) Karlovac	Gent	Undisclosed
30 August 2010	(Uruguay) Pablo Caballero	(Switzerland) Locarno	Eupen	Undisclosed
30 August 2010	Gertjan De Mets	Club Brugge	Kortrijk	Loan
30 August 2010	(France) Romain Élie	(France) Arles-Avignon	Charleroi	Loan
30 August 2010	(South Africa) Siboniso Gaxa	(South Africa) Mamelodi Sundowns	Lierse	Undisclosed
30 August 2010	(Angola) Gilberto	(Egypt) Al-Ahly	Lierse	Undisclosed
30 August 2010	(Morocco) Abderrazzak Jadid	(Italy) Parma	Eupen	Loan
30 August 2010	(Hungary) Péter Kovács	(Norway) Odd Grenland	Lierse	Undisclosed
30 August 2010	(Ecuador) Edson Montaño	(Ecuador) El Nacional	Gent	Undisclosed
31 August 2010	Christian Benteke	Standard Liège	Mechelen	Loan
31 August 2010	(Costa Rica) Júnior Díaz	(Poland) Wisła Kraków	Club Brugge	Undisclosed
31 August 2010	Stein Huysegems	Genk	(Netherlands) Roda JC	Loan
31 August 2010	(Senegal) Mbaye Leye	Gent	Standard Liège	Undisclosed
31 August 2010	(Cameroon) Aloys Nong	Mechelen	Standard Liège	Undisclosed
31 August 2010	(Italy) Mattia Notari	(Italy) Mantova	Lierse	Undisclosed
31 August 2010	(Bosnia and Herzegovina) Toni Šunjić	(Bosnia and Herzegovina) Zrinjski Mostar	Kortrijk	Undisclosed
31 August 2010	Mémé Tchité	(Spain) Racing Santander	Standard Liège	Undisclosed
31 August 2010	(Finland) Hermanni Vuorinen	(Finland) Honka Espoo	Charleroi	Undisclosed
31 August 2010	(Ukraine) Oleksandr Yakovenko	Anderlecht	Westerlo	Loan ^{19}

- ^{17} Matthys returned from a loan spell at Lierse, but in agreement between him and Zulte-Waregem, his contract was annulled and he was released. A few days later, Matthys signed for Mons.
- ^{18} Makiese was on loan and returned to Lille, who sold him to Laval.
- ^{19} Yakovenko was already on loan to Westerlo during the previous season. The loan ended in June but was now renewed for one more season.

=== September 2010 ===
Date	Name	Moving from	Moving to	Fee
1 September 2010	(Egypt) Ahmed Samir	Lierse	(Egypt) Zamalek	Released
1 September 2010	(Ivory Coast) Bakary Saré	Anderlecht	(Norway) Rosenborg	Loan
1 September 2010	(Brazil) Wallace	(Norway) Fredrikstad	Gent	Undisclosed
3 September 2010	(Germany) Sascha Kotysch	(Germany) 1. FC Kaiserslautern	Sint-Truiden	Free

== Sorted by team ==
=== Anderlecht ===
In:

No.	Pos.	Nation	Player
6	DF	ARG	Pier Barrios (on loan from (Argentina) Belgrano)
7	DF	CZE	Jan Lecjaks (from (Czech Republic) Plzeň)
19	FW	USA	Sacha Kljestan (from (United States) Chivas USA)
25	FW	ARG	Pablo Chavarría (from (Argentina) Belgrano)
28	GK	BEL	Michaël Cordier (loan return from Olympic Charleroi)
—	FW	COD	Junior Kabananga Kalonji (from (Democratic Republic of the Congo) Etancheité)
—	MF	BRA	Fernando Canesin Matos (from (Brazil) Olé Brasil)
—		ZAM	Lamisha Musonda (free agent)
—		ZAM	Tika Musonda (free agent)
—	MF	BEL	Dennis Praet (from Genk)
—	FW	SEN	Sébastien Siani (loan return from Sint-Truiden)

Out:

No.	Pos.	Nation	Player
1	GK	CZE	Daniel Zítka (to (Czech Republic) Sparta Prague)
4	DF	NED	Arnold Kruiswijk (to (Netherlands) Heerenveen)
6	DF	BEL	Jelle Van Damme (to (England) Wolverhampton Wanderers)
7	MF	HON	Mario Martínez (loan return to (Norway) Vålerengen)
12	MF	BEL	Thomas Chatelle (on loan to (Netherlands) NEC Nijmegen)
17	MF	ARG	Hernán Losada (loan return from (Netherlands) Heerenveen, now on loan to Charleroi)
19	FW	ARG	Nicolás Frutos (retired)
29	FW	RUS	Dmitri Bulykin (loan return from (Germany) Fortuna Düsseldorf, now on loan to Den Haag)
99	MF	CIV	Bakary Saré (on loan to (Norway) Rosenborg)
—	MF	BEL	Olivier Mukendi (on loan to Cercle Brugge)
—	MF	BRA	Reynaldo (on loan to Cercle Brugge)
—	MF	BEL	René Sterckx (on loan to Zulte Waregem)
—	MF	ENG	Paul Taylor (loan return from Charleroi, then released)
—	MF	UKR	Oleksandr Yakovenko (on loan to Westerlo)

=== Cercle Brugge ===
In:

No.	Pos.	Nation	Player
2	FW	BEL	Olivier Mukendi (on loan from Anderlecht)
18	MF	BRA	Reynaldo (on loan from Anderlecht)
19	MF	POR	Nuno Reis (on loan from (Portugal) Sporting CP)
21	MF	BRA	Renato Neto (on loan from (Portugal) Sporting CP)
38	FW	GHA	William Owusu (on loan from (Portugal) Sporting CP)

Out:

No.	Pos.	Nation	Player
22	DF	ZIM	Vuza Nyoni (to Germinal Beerschot)
—	FW	BEL	Olivier Claessens (to Dender EH)
—	FW	BEL	Jelle Vossen (loan return to Genk)

=== Charleroi ===
In:

No.	Pos.	Nation	Player
2	DF	ISR	Eytan Tibi (from (Israel) Beitar Jerusalem)
9	MF	ARG	Hernán Losada (on loan from Anderlecht)
16	FW	GAB	John Tshibumbu (from (France) Cannes)
18	FW	SEN	Moussa Gueye (from Mons)
19	DF	BEL	Naïm Aarab (from (Greece) AEL)
22	FW	BRA	Orlando (loan return from Genk)
24	MF	TUR	Onur Kaya (from (Netherlands) Vitesse Arnhem)
25	FW	BEL	Grégory Grisez (loan return from Boussu Dour Borinage)
99	FW	TOG	Adékambi Olufadé (from Gent)
—	DF	FRA	Romain Elie (on loan from (France) Arles-Avignon)
—	FW	FIN	Hermanni Vuorinen (from (Finland) Honka Espoo)

Out:

No.	Pos.	Nation	Player
5	MF	ALG	Adlène Guedioura (to (England) Wolverhampton Wanderers)
7	FW	CAF	Habib Habibou (to Zulte Waregem)
9	FW	SEN	Moussa Koita (loan return to Genk)
10	MF	BEL	Geoffrey Mujangi Bia (on loan to (England) Wolverhampton Wanderers)
24	MF	FRA	Grégory Christ (to Sint-Truiden)
27	FW	BEL	Ilombe Mboyo (on loan to Kortrijk)
77	FW	FRA	Cyril Théréau (to (Italy) Chievo Verona)
—	MF	BEL	Cédric Ciza (on loan to Visé)
—	DF	FRA	Mourad Satli (on loan to Boussu Dour)
—	MF	ENG	Paul Taylor (loan return to Anderlecht, who released him)
—	DF	BEL	David Vandenbroeck (loan return from Kortrijk, then sold to Zulte Waregem)

=== Club Brugge ===
In:

No.	Pos.	Nation	Player
6	MF	FRA	Wilfried Dalmat (from Standard Liège)
8	FW	SRB	Stefan Šćepović (from (Serbia) OFK Beograd)
17	DF	BRA	Marcos Camozzato (from Standard Liège)
—	DF	CRC	Júnior Díaz (from (Poland) Wisła Kraków)

Out:

No.	Pos.	Nation	Player
5	DF	CAN	Michael Klukowski (to (Turkey) Ankaragücü)
10	FW	BEL	Wesley Sonck (released, then moved to Lierse)
19	FW	PER	Daniel Chávez (to Westerlo)
27	MF	BEL	Roy Meeus (on loan to FC Dender until June 2011)
28	FW	BEL	Brecht Capon (to Kortrijk)
29	DF	BEL	Gertjan De Mets (on loan to Kortrijk)
30	DF	PAR	Antolin Alcaraz (to (England) Wigan Athletic)
—	DF	BEL	Laurent Ciman (to Standard Liège)
—	FW	BEL	Sven De Rechter (to Roeselare)
—	FW	SRB	Dušan Đokić (loan return from (China) Chongqing Lifan, then sold to (Poland) Zagłębie Lubin)
—	MF	BEL	Cédric Guiro (to Roeselare)
—	GK	BEL	Yves Lenaerts (to OH Leuven)
—	DF	BRA	Cleber Sonda (on loan to Roeselare)
—	GK	BEL	Glenn Verbauwhede (on loan to Kortrijk until June 2011)
—	MF	BEL	Masis Voskanian (to Roeselare)

=== Eupen ===
In:

No.	Pos.	Nation	Player
5	DF	BIH	Ervin Zukanović (from Dender EH)
8	DF	GUI	Ibrahima Camara (from (France) Le Mans)
12	GK	BEL	Olivier Werner (from Brussels)
25	MF	ALG	Yacine Hima (from (Switzerland) Bellinzona)
26	FW	BRA	Jefferson (on loan from (Italy) Fiorentina)
83	FW	BEL	Kevin Vandenbergh (from (Netherlands) Utrecht)
—	FW	BEL	Domenico Bruzzese (from RFC Liège)
—	MF	URU	Pablo Caballero (from (Switzerland) Locarno)
—	DF	BRA	Marcus Diniz (on loan from (Italy) AC Milan)
—	FW	DOM	José Espinal (from (Italy) Cesena)
—	MF	MAR	Abderrazzak Jadid (on loan from (Italy) Parma)
—	MF	BEL	Geoffrey Nizet (from RFC Liège)
—	MF	NGR	John Ugochukwu (from (Slovenia) Drava Ptuj)

Out:

No.	Pos.	Nation	Player
15	DF	SUI	Mijat Marić (to Lokeren)
22	DF	FRA	Mohamadou Sissoko (loan return to (Italy) Udinese)
—	MF	PAR	Juan Aguilar (loan return to (Switzerland) Bellinzona)
—	FW	GAB	Willy Aubameyang (loan return to (Italy) AC Milan)
—	MF	MAR	Sofian Benzouien (to (Luxembourg) F91 Dudelange)
—	FW	BEL	Jasson Conrad (to (Netherlands) AGOVV)
—	MF	BEL	Carlo Evertz (to Sint-Truiden)
—	FW	BEL	Edouard Kabamba (loan return to Standard Liège)

=== Racing Genk ===
In:

No.	Pos.	Nation	Player
19	FW	BEL	Jelle Vossen (loan return from Cercle Brugge)
39	FW	SEN	Moussa Koita (loan return from Charleroi)
—	MF	KEN	Ajub Masika (from Germinal Beerschot)

Out:

No.	Pos.	Nation	Player
1	GK	BEL	Davino Verhulst (on loan to (Netherlands) Willem II)
11	FW	NED	Istvan Bakx (on loan to (Netherlands) Den Bosch)
17	FW	BEL	Stein Huysegems (on loan to (Netherlands) Roda JC)
20	MF	HUN	Balázs Tóth (on loan to (Netherlands) Venlo)
—	FW	BRA	Orlando (loan return to Charleroi)
—	MF	BEL	Dennis Praet (to Anderlecht)

=== Gent ===
In:

No.	Pos.	Nation	Player
17	DF	BRA	Wallace (from (Norway) Fredrikstad)
22	DF	SLO	Matija Škarabot (from (Slovenia) Gorica)
23	FW	ISR	Shlomi Arbeitman (from (Israel) Maccabi Haifa)
24	FW	CIV	Soumahoro Yaya (from (Thailand) Muangthong United)
—	DF	CRO	Mario Barić (from (Croatia) Karlovac)
—	FW	ECU	Edson Montaño (from (Ecuador) El Nacional)

Out:

No.	Pos.	Nation	Player
9	FW	SEN	Mbaye Leye (to Standard Liège)
14	FW	BIH	Adnan Čustović (to Germinal Beerschot)
15	FW	TOG	Adékambi Olufadé (to Charleroi)
17	DF	VEN	Roberto Rosales (to (Netherlands) Twente)
21	FW	BEL	Luigi Pieroni (to Standard Liège)

=== Germinal Beerschot ===
In:

No.	Pos.	Nation	Player
4	DF	URU	Gary Kagelmacher (from (Spain) Real Madrid Castilla)
19	FW	BIH	Adnan Čustović (from Gent)
—	FW	BRA	Júnior Negrão (from (Brazil) Figueirense)
—	DF	ZIM	Vuza Nyoni (from Cercle Brugge)

Out:

No.	Pos.	Nation	Player
—	MF	CRO	Ivan Leko (to Lokeren)
—	MF	KEN	Ajub Masika (to Genk)

=== Kortrijk ===
In:

No.	Pos.	Nation	Player
6	DF	MAR	Chemcedine El Araichi (from (Hungary) Győr)
13	GK	BEL	Glenn Verbauwhede (on loan from Club Brugge)
15	DF	FRA	Baptiste Martin (from (France) Auxerre)
17	MF	CRO	Mario Carević (from Lokeren)
19	FW	BEL	Ilombe Mboyo (on loan from Charleroi)
21	FW	BEL	Brecht Capon (from Club Brugge)
25	DF	ISR	Rami Gershon (on loan from Standard Liège)
—	FW	FRA	Cédric Bétrémieux (loan return from OH Leuven)
—	DF	BEL	Gertjan De Mets (on loan from Club Brugge)
—	DF	BIH	Toni Šunjić (from (Bosnia and Herzegovina) Zrinjski Mostar)

Out:

No.	Pos.	Nation	Player
8	DF	BEL	Jimmy Hempte (to (Netherlands) Roda JC)
17	DF	BEL	Brecht Verbrugghe (released)
25	FW	BEL	Christian Benteke (loan return to Standard Liège)
—	DF	BEL	Laurent Ciman (loan return to Club Brugge, who sold him to Standard Liège)
—	DF	BEL	David Vandenbroeck (loan return to Charleroi)

=== Lierse ===
In:

No.	Pos.	Nation	Player
1	GK	JPN	Eiji Kawashima (from (Japan) Kawasaki Frontale)
2	DF	BEL	Kris de Wree (from (Netherlands) Roda)
5	MF	FRA	Youssef Sekour (from (France) Sedan)
6	FW	BEL	Joeri Dequevy (from Roeselare)
10	FW	BEL	Wesley Sonck (from Club Brugge)
14	MF	RSA	Daylon Claasen (from (Netherlands) Jong Ajax)
28	MF	FRA	Benjamin Nicaise (from Standard Liège)
29	MF	RSA	Lance Davids (from (South Africa) Ajax Cape Town)
—	MF	RSA	Siboniso Gaxa (from (South Africa) Mamelodi Sundowns)
—	MF	ANG	Gilberto (from (Egypt) Al-Ahly)
—	FW	HUN	Péter Kovács (from (Norway) Odd Grenland)
—	DF	ITA	Mattia Notari (from (Italy) Mantova)

Out:

No.	Pos.	Nation	Player
1	GK	BEL	Sven van der Jeugt (to Sint-Truiden)
2	DF	BEL	Eric Deflandre (to RFC Liège)
5	MF	BEL	Seth De Witte (to Mechelen)
10	MF	EGY	Ahmed Samir (to (Egypt) Zamalek)
14	FW	BEL	Tim Matthys (loan return to Zulte Waregem)
16	MF	EGY	Sherif El Baily (released)
18	FW	BDI	Selemani Ndikumana (released)
26	FW	BEL	Dries Ventose (released to Rupel Boom FC)
32	DF	BEL	Thomas De Corte (released to Antwerp FC, was on loan to Lyra TSV)

=== Lokeren ===
In:

No.	Pos.	Nation	Player
2	DF	BEL	Sepp De Roover (from (Netherlands) Groningen)
4	DF	SUI	Mijat Marić (from Eupen)
8	MF	BEL	Koen Persoons (from Mechelen)
11	FW	BEL	Benjamin De Ceulaer (from (Netherlands) RKC)
17	FW	BEL	Ivan Yagan (from WS Woluwe)
22	DF	FRA	Jérémy Taravel (from Zulte Waregem)
25	FW	NOR	Vegard Braaten (from (Norway) Tromsø)
78	MF	CRO	Ivan Leko (from Germinal Beerschot)

Out:

No.	Pos.	Nation	Player
2	DF	ISR	Yoav Ziv (to (Israel) Maccabi Tel Aviv)
4	DF	BEL	Olivier Doll (retired)
5	DF	ISR	Avi Strool (to (Israel) Maccabi Tel Aviv)
18	MF	CRO	Mario Carević (to Kortrijk)

=== Mechelen ===
In:

No.	Pos.	Nation	Player
3	MF	BEL	Seth De Witte (from Lierse)
4	DF	BIH	Boris Pandža (from (Croatia) Hajduk Split)
6	MF	ISL	Bjarni Viðarsson (from Roeselare)
9	FW	BEL	Jonathan Wilmet (from Sint-Truiden)
21	DF	BEL	Anthony Van Loo (from Roeselare)
25	DF	BEL	Zinou Chergui (from KVSK United)
—	FW	BEL	Christian Benteke (on loan from Standard Liège)

Out:

No.	Pos.	Nation	Player
3	DF	BEL	Jonas Ivens (to (Netherlands) Groningen)
4	DF	BEL	Jeroen Mellemans (to Oosterzonen)
7	MF	BEL	Kenneth Van Goethem (to OH Leuven)
12	GK	BEL	Jérémy De Vriendt (to (Netherlands) NEC)
14	FW	CMR	Aloys Nong (to Standard Liège)
21	MF	JOR	Abdallah Salim (released)
32	DF	BEL	Cor Gillis (released)

=== Sint-Truiden ===
In:

No.	Pos.	Nation	Player
1	GK	BEL	Mark Volders (unattached)
7	MF	SEN	Pape Abdou Camara (from Standard Liège)
9	FW	BEL	Andréa Mbuyi-Mutombo (on loan from Standard Liège)
10	MF	FRA	Grégory Christ (from Charleroi)
11	MF	BEL	Carlo Evertz (from Eupen)
15	MF	BEL	Tom Caluwé (from (Qatar) Al-Wakrah)
22	GK	BEL	Sven Van Der Jeugt (from Lierse)
—	DF	GER	Sascha Kotysch (from (Germany) 1. FC Kaiserslautern)

Out:

No.	Pos.	Nation	Player
1	GK	BEL	Tom Muyters (to Zulte Waregem)
5	DF	SUI	Mario Cantaluppi (becoming coach at (Switzerland) Buochs)
9	FW	SEN	Sébastien Siani (loan return to Anderlecht)
10	FW	BEL	Jonathan Wilmet (to Mechelen)
11	MF	BEL	Issame Charaï (released)
16	MF	BEL	Jeroen Appeltans (on loan to Tienen)
22	GK	BEL	Simon Mignolet (to (England) Sunderland)
—	GK	BEL	Luca Bruno (to Dessel)

=== Standard Liège ===
In:

No.	Pos.	Nation	Player
4	DF	GHA	Daniel Opare (from (Spain) Real Madrid Castilla)
6	DF	BEL	Laurent Ciman (from Club Brugge)
7	MF	FRA	Franck Berrier (from Zulte Waregem)
9	FW	BEL	Luigi Pieroni (from Gent)
10	FW	BEL	Mémé Tchité (from (Spain) Racing Santander)
13	FW	CMR	Aloys Nong (from Mechelen)
14	MF	BRA	Danilo Sousa Campos (from (Netherlands) Ajax)
17	MF	FRA	Hans Dibi (from RFC Liège)
19	MF	CRO	Alen Pamić (from (Croatia) Rijeka)
21	FW	BEL	Edouard Kabamba (loan return from Eupen)
23	MF	BEL	Tom De Mul (on loan from (Spain) Sevilla)
25	FW	BEL	Christian Benteke (loan return from Kortrijk)
99	FW	SEN	Mbaye Leye (from Gent)
—	DF	FRA	Jonathan Mendes (loan return from Tubize)
—	FW	EGY	Emad Motaeb (from (Egypt) Al-Ahly)

Out:

No.	Pos.	Nation	Player
7	MF	FRA	Wilfried Dalmat (to Club Brugge)
9	FW	COD	Dieumerci Mbokani (to (France) AS Monaco)
10	FW	BEL	Igor de Camargo (to (Germany) Borussia Mönchengladbach)
14	DF	BEL	Landry Mulemo (to (Turkey) Bucaspor)
17	DF	BRA	Marcos Camozzato (to Club Brugge)
18	FW	BEL	Andréa Mbuyi-Mutombo (on loan to Sint-Truiden)
20	FW	CIV	Moussa Traoré (on loan to Zulte Waregem)
23	FW	SRB	Milan Jovanović (to (England) Liverpool)
24	DF	BRA	Alex Moraes (loan return to (Brazil) Apucarana)
25	FW	BEL	Christian Benteke (on loan to Mechelen)
26	MF	FRA	Benjamin Nicaise (to Lierse)
—	MF	SEN	Pape Abdou Camara (to Sint-Truiden)
—	DF	ISR	Rami Gershon (on loan to Kortrijk)

=== Westerlo ===
In:

No.	Pos.	Nation	Player
5	DF	BEL	Geoffrey Cabeke (from Brussels)
8	MF	BEL	Christian Brüls (from (Netherlands) MVV)
11	FW	PER	Daniel Chávez (from Club Brugge)
17	MF	RSA	Elrio van Heerden (from (Turkey) Sivasspor)
—	FW	BRA	Paulo Henrique (on loan from (Brazil) Palmeiras)
—	MF	UKR	Oleksandr Yakovenko (on loan from Anderlecht)

Out:

No.	Pos.	Nation	Player
6	MF	BEL	Wouter Scheelen (loan return from KVSK United, then loaned to OH Leuven)
—	MF	BEL	Nico van Kerckhoven (retired)

=== Zulte Waregem ===
In:

No.	Pos.	Nation	Player
4	DF	BEL	David Vandenbroeck (from Charleroi)
7	FW	CAF	Habib Habibou (from Charleroi)
14	FW	NED	Jeremy Bokila (from (Netherlands) Apeldoorn)
15	MF	SEN	Zakaria Gueye (from (France) Pacy Vallée-d'Eure)
16	MF	BEL	René Sterckx (on loan from Anderlecht)
18	FW	CIV	Moussa Traoré (on loan from Standard Liège)
22	GK	BEL	Tom Muyters (from Sint-Truiden)
28	MF	FRA	Jonathan Delaplace (from (France) ES Fréjus)
—	DF	FRA	Rémi Maréval (from (France) Nantes)
—	MF	BEL	Lander Van Steenbrugghe (loan return from OH Leuven)

Out:

No.	Pos.	Nation	Player
5	DF	BEL	Bart Buysse (to (Netherlands) Twente)
7	DF	FRA	Jérémy Taravel (to Lokeren)
11	FW	FIN	Berat Sadik (loan return to (Germany) Arminia Bielefeld)
13	FW	DEN	Emil Lyng (loan return to (France) Lille)
16	MF	FRA	Franck Berrier (to Standard Liège)
18	GK	BEL	Kevin Goeman (loan return to (France) Lens)
—	FW	FRA	Chris Makiese (loan return to (France) Lille, then sold to (France) Laval)
—	FW	BEL	Tim Matthys (loan return from Lierse, then released to Mons)
