= List of Belgian football transfers winter 2009–10 =

This is a list of Belgian football transfers for the 2009–10 winter transfer window. Only transfers involving a team from the Jupiler League are listed.

The winter transfer window opens on 1 January 2010, although a few transfers may take place prior to that date. The window closes at midnight on 1 February 2010. Players without a club may join one, either during or in between transfer windows.

== Sorted by date ==
=== September 2009 ===
Date	Name	Moving from	Moving to	Fee
11 September 2009	(Oman) Imad Al Hosni	(Qatar) Al-Rayyan	Charleroi	700.000 €
15 September 2009	(France) Cédric Berthelin	Dender	Mouscron	Free
21 September 2009	(France) Olivier Dacourt	Unattached	Standard Liège	Free

=== December 2009 ===
Date	Name	Moving from	Moving to	Fee
15 December 2009	(England) Paul Taylor	Montegnée	Anderlecht	Undisclosed
16 December 2009	(Czech Republic) Ondřej Mazuch	(Italy) Fiorentina	Anderlecht	1.300.000 €^{1}
25 December 2009	(Brazil) Reynaldo	Anderlecht	Cercle Brugge	Loan
28 December 2009	All Mouscron players	Mouscron	Free Agent	Contract Terminated
28 December 2009	(Ghana) Samuel Yeboah	(Israel) Hapoel Tel Aviv	Genk	700.000 €
29 December 2009	Massimo Moia	Sint-Truiden	Charleroi	Loan^{2}
30 December 2009	Cédric Ciza	Anderlecht	Charleroi	Loan
30 December 2009	(United States) Jared Jeffrey	Club Brugge	(Germany) 1. FSV Mainz 05	Undisclosed
31 December 2009	Grégory Grisez	Charleroi	Boussu Dour Borinage	Loan

- ^{1} Ondřej Mazuch was already on loan from Fiorentina, now bought.
- ^{2} Massimo Moia was on a season long loan since the summer 2009 transferperiod, but he was sent back by Sint-Truiden.

=== End of 2009 ===
Several players were on a loan which ended in 2009. As of 1 January 2010, they returned to their original club and are listed here. For a list of players on loan during the last year, see List of Belgian football transfers winter 2008–09 and summer 2009.

Date	Name	Moving from	Moving to	Fee
End of 2009	(Poland) Dawid Janczyk	Lokeren	(Russia) CSKA Moscow	Loan Return

=== January 2010 ===
Date	Name	Moving from	Moving to	Fee
2 January 2010	(Netherlands) Arnold Kruiswijk	Anderlecht	(Netherlands) Roda JC	Loan
3 January 2010	Guillaume François	Free Agent	Germinal Beerschot	NA
4 January 2010	(Honduras) Mario Martínez	(Honduras) Real España	Anderlecht	Loan^{3}
5 January 2010	(Netherlands) Anduele Pryor	(Netherlands) Vitesse Arnhem	Roeselare	Loan
6 January 2010	Maxime Lestienne	Free Agent	Club Brugge	NA
7 January 2010	(France) Jérémy Perbet	Tubize	Lokeren	Undisclosed^{4}
7 January 2010	(Australia) Nikita Rukavytsya	(Netherlands) Twente	Roeselare	Loan
8 January 2010	Daan van Gijseghem	Free Agent	Club Brugge	NA
9 January 2010	(Ghana) Ernest Adjetey	Anderlecht	Zaventem	Undisclosed
9 January 2010	(Iceland) Hólmar Örn Eyjólfsson	(England) West Ham	Roeselare	Loan
9 January 2010	(Serbia) Miloš Marić	Gent	(Germany) VfL Bochum	Undisclosed
9 January 2010	(Cameroon) Bertin Tomou	Westerlo	Roeselare	Undisclosed
12 January 2010	Olivier Mukendi	Anderlecht	Cercle Brugge	Loan
14 January 2010	Benjamin Mokulu	Oostende	Lokeren	Undisclosed^{5}
15 January 2010	Koen Daerden	Club Brugge	Standard Liège	Undisclosed
15 January 2010	(Poland) Dawid Janczyk	(Russia) CSKA Moscow	Germinal Beerschot	Loan
18 January 2010	(Senegal) Pape Camara	(Senegal) Etoile Lusitana	Standard Liège	Undisclosed
20 January 2010	(Montenegro) Srđan Blažić	(Greece) Levadiakos	Standard Liège	Free^{6}
20 January 2010	(Brazil) Ederson	Genk	Charleroi	Loan
20 January 2010	(Romania) Gheorghe Grozav	(Romania) Alba Iulia	Standard Liège	Undisclosed
21 January 2010	Geoffrey Mujangi Bia	Charleroi	(England) Wolverhampton	Loan
21 January 2010	Peter Van Der Heyden	(Germany) 1. FSV Mainz 05	Club Brugge	Undisclosed
22 January 2010	Luigi Pieroni	(France) Valenciennes	Gent	Undisclosed
25 January 2010	(Algeria) Adlène Guedioura	Charleroi	(England) Wolverhampton	Loan
26 January 2010	(Denmark) Emil Lyng	(France) Lille	Zulte Waregem	Loan
26 January 2010	(Czech Republic) Lukáš Mareček	(Czech Republic) Brno	Anderlecht	Undisclosed
26 January 2010	Sébastien Pocognoli	(Netherlands) AZ Alkmaar	Standard Liège	Undisclosed
26 January 2010	(England) Paul Taylor	Anderlecht	Free Agent	NA^{7}
26 January 2010	(England) Paul Taylor	Free Agent	Charleroi	NA^{7}
27 January 2010	Michaël Cordier	Anderlecht	Olympic Charleroi	Loan
29 January 2010	Sébastien Bruzzese	Anderlecht	Gent	Undisclosed
29 January 2010	Edouard Kabamba	Standard Liège	Eupen	Loan
29 January 2010	Tom Soetaers	Kortrijk	Mechelen	Undisclosed
29 January 2010	Wouter Vrancken	Mechelen	Kortrijk	Undisclosed
31 January 2010	Bart van Zundert	Zulte Waregem	Dender EH	Loan

- ^{3} Martínez was previously on loan to Vålerenga where his loan ended. After this Real España decided to loan him to Anderlecht.
- ^{4} Perbet first signed a contract with Sint-Truiden on 29 December. On 5 January the news spread that although Perbet has already signed a contract, Sint-Truiden and Tubize were still negotiating when he would join Sint-Truiden. The latter were willing to wait until June, when his contract at Tubize was going to expire. Two days later on 7 January, Lokeren signed Perbet, causing disbelief and anger at Sint-Truiden. Perbet claims he only had a verbal contract at Sint-Truiden, while Sint-Truiden claim that they possess an official document which Perbet signed. If so, it is unsure how this will evolve. However, Perbet has since then played for Lokeren and it seems the case is closed.
- ^{5} Mokulu has signed a four-year contract with Lokeren which will start in June 2010, but Lokeren and Oostende are still in negotiation as Lokeren would like to immediately sign him.
- ^{6} Blažić' contract with Levadiakos only expires in June 2010, he will join Standard in the summer of 2010.
- ^{7} Anderlecht wanted to loan Taylor to Charleroi, however Taylor had just recently signed for Anderlecht on 15 December 2009 and the rules of the Royal Belgian Football Association state that no player can be transferred more than once between teams within one season. Therefore, Anderlecht annulled the contract with Taylor, after which Charleroi immediately signed him to avoid him being seen as a transfer It is assumed that Taylor will return at the end of the season.

=== February 2010 ===
Date	Name	Moving from	Moving to	Fee
1 February 2010	(Serbia) Dragan Ćeran	(Serbia) Smederevo	Westerlo	Loan
1 February 2010	Björn De Wilde	Roeselare	Waasland	Free
1 February 2010	(Senegal) Moussa Koita	Genk	Charleroi	Loan
1 February 2010	(Croatia) Ivan Leko	Germinal Beerschot	Lokeren	Loan
1 February 2010	(Brazil) Orlando	Charleroi	Genk	Loan
1 February 2010	(Portugal) Ricardo Rocha	Standard Liège	(England) Portsmouth	Undisclosed
1 February 2010	Wouter Scheelen	Westerlo	KVSK United	Loan

== Sorted by team ==
=== Anderlecht ===
In:

No.	Pos.	Nation	Player
—	MF	CZE	Lukáš Mareček (from Brno)
—	MF	HON	Mario Martínez (on loan from Real España)
—	DF	CZE	Ondřej Mazuch (from Fiorentina)
—	FW	ENG	Paul Taylor (from Montegnée)

Out:

No.	Pos.	Nation	Player
4	DF	NED	Arnold Kruiswijk (on loan to Roda JC)
25	GK	BEL	Sébastien Bruzzese (to Gent)
28	GK	BEL	Michaël Cordier (on loan to Olympic Charleroi)
—	MF	BEL	Cédric Ciza (on loan to Charleroi)
—	MF	BEL	Olivier Mukendi (on loan to Cercle Brugge)
—	MF	BRA	Reynaldo (on loan to Cercle Brugge)
—	FW	ENG	Paul Taylor (released)

=== Cercle Brugge ===
In:

No.	Pos.	Nation	Player
—	MF	BEL	Olivier Mukendi (on loan from Anderlecht)
—	MF	BRA	Reynaldo (on loan from Anderlecht)

Out:

No.	Pos.	Nation	Player

=== Charleroi ===
In:

No.	Pos.	Nation	Player
—	FW	OMA	Imad Al Hosni (from Al-Rayyan)
—	MF	BEL	Cédric Ciza (on loan from Anderlecht)
—	MF	BRA	Ederson (on loan from Genk)
—	FW	SEN	Moussa Koita (on loan from Genk)
—	MF	BEL	Massimo Moia (loan return to Sint-Truiden)
—	FW	ENG	Paul Taylor (free agent)

Out:

No.	Pos.	Nation	Player
5	MF	ALG	Adlène Guedioura (on loan to Wolverhampton)
10	MF	BEL	Geoffrey Mujangi Bia (on loan to Wolverhampton)
22	FW	BRA	Orlando (on loan to Genk)
—	FW	BEL	Grégory Grisez (on loan to Boussu Dour Borinage)

=== Club Brugge ===
In:

No.	Pos.	Nation	Player
3	DF	BEL	Peter Van Der Heyden (from Mainz)
16	FW	BEL	Maxime Lestienne (free agent)
24	DF	BEL	Daan van Gijseghem (free agent)

Out:

No.	Pos.	Nation	Player
3	MF	USA	Jared Jeffrey (to Mainz)
7	MF	BEL	Koen Daerden (to Standard Liège)

=== Genk ===
In:

No.	Pos.	Nation	Player
—	FW	BRA	Orlando (on loan from Genk)
—	FW	GHA	Samuel Yeboah (from Hapoel Tel Aviv)

Out:

No.	Pos.	Nation	Player
6	MF	BRA	Ederson (on loan to Charleroi)
9	FW	SEN	Moussa Koita (on loan to Charleroi)

=== Gent ===
In:

No.	Pos.	Nation	Player
21	FW	BEL	Luigi Pieroni (from Valenciennes)
—	GK	BEL	Sébastien Bruzzese (from Anderlecht)

Out:

No.	Pos.	Nation	Player
28	MF	SRB	Miloš Marić (to Bochum)

=== Germinal Beerschot ===
In:

No.	Pos.	Nation	Player
—	FW	BEL	Guillaume François (free agent)
—	FW	POL	Dawid Janczyk (on loan from CSKA Moscow)

Out:

No.	Pos.	Nation	Player
—	MF	CRO	Ivan Leko (on loan to Lokeren)

=== Kortrijk ===
In:

No.	Pos.	Nation	Player
—	MF	BEL	Wouter Vrancken (from Mechelen)

Out:

No.	Pos.	Nation	Player
11	MF	BEL	Tom Soetaers (to Mechelen)

=== Lokeren ===
In:

No.	Pos.	Nation	Player
—	MF	CRO	Ivan Leko (on loan from Germinal Beerschot)
—	FW	BEL	Benjamin Mokulu (from Oostende)
—	FW	FRA	Jérémy Perbet (from Tubize)

Out:

No.	Pos.	Nation	Player
—	FW	POL	Dawid Janczyk (loan return to CSKA Moscow)

=== Mechelen ===
In:

No.	Pos.	Nation	Player
—	MF	BEL	Tom Soetaers (from Kortrijk)

Out:

No.	Pos.	Nation	Player
25	MF	BEL	Wouter Vrancken (to Kortrijk)

=== Mouscron ===
Note: because Mouscron was declared bankrupt on 28 December 2009, all players were released as their contracts were terminated. Berthelin was signed before the bankruptcy, but also released.

In:

No.	Pos.	Nation	Player
—	GK	FRA	Cédric Berthelin (from Dender)

Out:

No.	Pos.	Nation	Player
—			All players (contract terminated)

=== Roeselare ===
In:

No.	Pos.	Nation	Player
2	DF	ISL	Hólmar Örn Eyjólfsson (on loan from West Ham)
29	FW	AUS	Nikita Rukavytsya (on loan from Twente)
30	FW	CMR	Bertin Tomou (from Westerlo)
33	MF	NED	Anduele Pryor (on loan from Vitesse Arnhem)

Out:

No.	Pos.	Nation	Player
—	FW	BEL	Björn De Wilde (to Waasland)

=== Sint-Truiden ===
In:

No.	Pos.	Nation	Player

Out:

No.	Pos.	Nation	Player
—	MF	BEL	Massimo Moia (loan contract terminated)

=== Standard Liège ===
In:

No.	Pos.	Nation	Player
15	MF	FRA	Olivier Dacourt (free agent)
24	MF	BEL	Koen Daerden (from Club Brugge)
90	FW	ROU	Gheorghe Grozav (from Alba Iulia)
35	MF	BEL	Sébastien Pocognoli (from AZ Alkmaar)
—	GK	MNE	Srđan Blažić (from Levadiakos (In June 2010 ^{5}))
—		SEN	Pape Camara (from Etoile Lusitana)

Out:

No.	Pos.	Nation	Player
4	DF	POR	Ricardo Rocha (to Portsmouth)
—	FW	BEL	Edouard Kabamba (on loan to Eupen)

=== Westerlo ===
In:

No.	Pos.	Nation	Player
—	FW	SRB	Dragan Ćeran (on loan from Smederevo)

Out:

No.	Pos.	Nation	Player
5	MF	BEL	Wouter Scheelen (on loan to KVSK United)
9	FW	CMR	Bertin Tomou (to Roeselare)

=== Zulte Waregem ===
In:

No.	Pos.	Nation	Player
—	FW	DEN	Emil Lyng (on loan from Lille)

Out:

No.	Pos.	Nation	Player
—	DF	BEL	Bart van Zundert (on loan to Dender EH)
