= 2009–10 Standard Liège season =

Standard Liège
2009–10 season
- Chairman: Reto Stiffler
- Manager: László Bölöni (until February 10); Dominique D'Onofrio (from 10 February)
- Stadium: Stade Maurice Dufrasne
- Belgian Pro League: 6th
- Belgian Cup: Seventh round
- Belgian Super Cup: Winners
- UEFA Champions League: Third in group stage
- UEFA Europa League: Quarter-finals
- Top goalscorer: Milan Jovanović (10)

During the 2009–10 Belgian football season, Standard Liège competed in the Belgian Pro League.

== Season summary ==
Having won the title the past two seasons running, Liège were looking to make it a hat-trick of title, but very quickly fell off the title race. Manager László Bölöni resigned in February with the club 19 points adrift of leaders Anderlecht. He was replaced by Dominique D'Onofrio, brother of club vice-president Lucien and Liège's former technical director between 2002 and 2006. However, the club's form failed to improve making them finish in eighth place, two points adrift of the title play-offs - as a result, failing to qualify for European competition.

== Kit ==
Liège's kits were sponsored by Belgian telecommunications company BASE.

== First-team squad ==
Squad at end of season

Note: Flags indicate national team as defined under FIFA eligibility rules; some limited exceptions apply. Players may hold more than one non-FIFA nationality.

No.	Pos.	Nation	Player
1	GK	BEL	Kristof Van Hout
2	DF	BEL	Réginal Goreux
3	DF	BRA	Victor Ramos
4	MF	SEN	Pape Abdou Camara
5	DF	BRA	Felipe
6	MF	FRA	Cédric Collet
7	MF	FRA	Wilfried Dalmat
8	MF	BEL	Steven Defour (captain)
9	FW	COD	Dieumerci Mbokani
10	FW	BRA	Igor de Camargo
11	MF	BEL	Grégory Dufer
14	DF	BEL	Landry Mulemo
15	FW	BEL	Andréa Mbuyi-Mutombo
16	GK	BEL	Anthony Moris
17	DF	BRA	Camozzato
18	GK	BEL	Jesse Soubry
19	DF	SEN	Mohamed Sarr

No.	Pos.	Nation	Player
20	FW	CIV	Moussa Traoré (on loan from Commune FC)
21	MF	BEL	Franco Zennaro
22	DF	FRA	Eliaquim Mangala
23	FW	SRB	Milan Jovanović
24	MF	BEL	Koen Daerden
25	DF	ISR	Rami Gershon (on loan from Hapoel Rishon LeZion)
26	MF	FRA	Benjamin Nicaise
27	MF	BEL	Arnor Angeli
28	MF	BEL	Axel Witsel
29	FW	CIV	Gohi Bi Zoro Cyriac
31	DF	BRA	Alex Moraes (on loan from Roma Apucarana)
32	DF	BEL	Jonathan Buatu Mananga
33	MF	BEL	Mehdi Carcela
35	DF	BEL	Sébastien Pocognoli
38	GK	TUR	Sinan Bolat
77	MF	ROU	Gheorghe Grozav

=== Left club during season ===
Note: Flags indicate national team as defined under FIFA eligibility rules; some limited exceptions apply. Players may hold more than one non-FIFA nationality.

No.	Pos.	Nation	Player
3	DF	BEL	Fazlı Kocabaş (to Eupen)
4	DF	POR	Ricardo Rocha (released)
15	DF	CRO	Tomislav Mikulić (to Beerschot)

No.	Pos.	Nation	Player
15	MF	FRA	Olivier Dacourt (released)
25	FW	BEL	Christian Benteke (on loan to Kortrijk)
30	MF	ARM	Hiraç Yagan (on loan to Tubize)

== Results ==
=== Belgian Cup ===
27 October 2009 Sixth round	Standard Liège	2–1 (a.e.t.)	Lierse	Stade Maurice Dufrasne, Liège
20:00 CET	Nicaise 11'; Dufer 112' (pen.)		Samir 80'

23 December 2009 Seventh round	Standard Liège	1–2	Kortrijk	Stade Maurice Dufrasne, Liège
20:30 CET	Witsel 80'		Capon 30'; Benteke 33'

=== UEFA Champions League ===
==== Group stage ====
Pos	Team	Pld	W	D	L	GF	GA	GD	Pts	Qualification	ARS	OLY	STL	AZ
1	(England) Arsenal	6	4	1	1	12	5	+7	13	Advance to knockout phase	—	2–0	2–0	4–1
2	(Greece) Olympiacos	6	3	1	2	4	5	−1	10	Advance to knockout phase	1–0	—	2–1	1–0
3	(Belgium) Standard Liège	6	1	2	3	7	9	−2	5	Transfer to Europa League	2–3	2–0	—	1–1
4	(Netherlands) AZ	6	0	4	2	4	8	−4	4		1–1	0–0	1–1	—

Source: RSSSF

16 September 2009	Standard Liège (Belgium)	2–3	(England) Arsenal	Stade Maurice Dufrasne, Liège
20:45	Mangala 3'; Jovanović 5' (pen.)	Report	Bendtner 45'; Vermaelen 77'; Eduardo 81'	Attendance: 23,022; Referee: Eduardo Iturralde González (Spain)

29 September 2009	AZ (Netherlands)	1–1	(Belgium) Standard Liège	DSB Stadion, Alkmaar
20:45	El Hamdaoui 48'	Report	Traoré 90+1'	Attendance: 16,373; Referee: Wolfgang Stark (Germany)

20 October 2009	Olympiacos (Greece)	2–1	(Belgium) Standard Liège	Karaiskakis Stadium, Athens
20:45	Mitroglou 43'; Stoltidis 90+3'	Report	De Camargo 37'	Attendance: 29,889; Referee: Pedro Proença (Portugal)

4 November 2009	Standard Liège (Belgium)	2–0	(Greece) Olympiacos	Stade Maurice Dufrasne, Liège
20:45	Mbokani 31'; Jovanović 88'	Report		Attendance: 24,787; Referee: Nicola Rizzoli (Italy)

24 November 2009	Arsenal (England)	2–0	(Belgium) Standard Liège	Emirates Stadium, London
20:45	Nasri 35'; Denílson 45+2'	Report		Attendance: 59,941; Referee: Konrad Plautz (Austria)

9 December 2009	Standard Liège (Belgium)	1–1	(Netherlands) AZ	Stade Maurice Dufrasne, Liège
20:45	Bolat 90+5'	Report	Lens 42'	Attendance: 24,359; Referee: Martin Atkinson (England)

=== UEFA Europa League ===
==== Knockout phase ====
===== Round of 32 =====
18 February 2010 First leg	Standard Liège (Belgium)	3–2	(Austria) Red Bull Salzburg	Stade Maurice Dufrasne, Liège
19:00	Witsel 66' (pen.), 82'; De Camargo 80'	Report	Janko 4', 45'	Attendance: 21,000; Referee: Cristian Balaj (Romania)

25 February 2010 Second leg	Red Bull Salzburg (Austria)	0–0 (2–3 agg.)	(Belgium) Standard Liège	Red Bull Arena, Salzburg
21:05		Report		Attendance: 26,500; Referee: Alan Kelly (Republic of Ireland)

===== Round of 16 =====
11 March 2010 First leg	Panathinaikos (Greece)	1–3	(Belgium) Standard Liège	Olympic Stadium, Athens
21:05	Vyntra 48'	Report	Witsel 8'; Jovanović 16'; De Camargo 74'	Attendance: 50,782; Referee: Craig Thomson (Scotland)

18 March 2010 Second leg	Standard Liège (Belgium)	1–0 (4–1 agg.)	(Greece) Panathinaikos	Stade Maurice Dufrasne, Liège
19:00	Mbokani 45+2'	Report		Attendance: 29,000; Referee: Gianluca Rocchi (Italy)

===== Quarter-finals =====
1 April 2010 First leg	Hamburg (Germany)	2–1	(Belgium) Standard Liège	HSH Nordbank Arena, Hamburg
21:05	Petrić 42' (pen.); Van Nistelrooy 45'	Report	Mbokani 31'	Attendance: 48,437; Referee: Martin Atkinson (England)

8 April 2010 Second leg	Standard Liège (Belgium)	1–3 (2–5 agg.)	(Germany) Hamburg	Stade Maurice Dufrasne, Liège
21:05	De Camargo 33'	Report	Petrić 20', 35'; Guerrero 90+4'	Attendance: 27,000; Referee: Pedro Proença (Portugal)
