= Frane Vidović =

Croatian footballer

Personal information
- Date of birth: 18 April 1999 (age 27)
- Place of birth: Rijeka, Croatia
- Height: 1.73 m (5 ft 8 in)
- Positions: Defender; winger

Senior career*
Years	Team	Apps	(Gls)
-2017	Dinamo Zagreb II	1	(0)
2017-2018	Rudeš	2	(0)
2018	Krk		
2018-2020	Istra 1961	0	(0)
2019-2020	→ Međimurje (loan)	21	(0)
2020-2021	Crikvenica		
2022	VfL 08 Vichttal	10	(0)
- * Club domestic league appearances and goals

Frane Vidović (born 18 April 1999 in Croatia) is a Croatian footballer.
