= 2009 Belgian Super Cup =

Standard Liège	Genk
2	0
- Date: 25 July 2009
- Venue: Stade Maurice Dufrasne, Liège

The 2009 Belgian Super Cup was a football match played on 25 July 2009, between 2008–09 Belgian First Division winners Standard Liège and 2008–09 Belgian Cup winners K.R.C. Genk. The cup was won 2–0 by Standard Liège.

== Match details ==
2009-07-25

Standard Liège	2–0	Genk
Dalmat 30'; Witsel 60'

Stade Maurice Dufrasne, Liège

Standard	Genk

STANDARD LIEGE:
GK	38	(Turkey) Sinan Bolat
DF	17	(Brazil) Marcos
DF	19	(Senegal) Mohamed Sarr	(yellow card) 22'
DF	15	(Croatia) Tomislav Mikulić
DF	14	(Belgium) Landry Mulemo	(yellow card) 73'
MF	7	(France) Wilfried Dalmat
MF	28	(Belgium) Axel Witsel	(yellow card) 28'
MF	8	(Belgium) Steven Defour (c)		(substituted off) 85'
FW	23	(Serbia) Milan Jovanović		(substituted off) 71'
FW	9	(Democratic Republic of the Congo) Dieumerci Mbokani
FW	29	(Ivory Coast) Cyriac		(substituted off) 45'
Substitutes:
GK	16	(Belgium) Jesse Soubry
DF	27	(Belgium) Arnor Angeli
MF	22	(France) Eliaquim Mangala		(substituted on) 85'
MF	33	(Belgium) Mehdi Carcela-Gonzalez		(substituted on) 45'
MF	11	(Belgium) Grégory Dufer
FW	10	(Belgium) Igor De Camargo		(substituted on) 71'
FW	20	(Ivory Coast) Moussa Traoré
Manager:
(Romania) László Bölöni

KRC GENK:
GK	1	(Belgium) Davino Verhulst
DF	23	(Belgium) Hans Cornelis	(yellow card) 51'
DF	30	(Brazil) João Carlos (c)
DF	27	(Bulgaria) Tiago	(yellow card) 57'	(substituted off) 61'
MF	16	(South Africa) Anele Ngcongca
MF	3	(Belgium) David Hubert	(yellow card) 28'
MF	8	(Hungary) Dániel Tőzsér
MF	33	(Czech Republic) Daniel Pudil
FW	14	(Belgium) Kevin De Bruyne		(substituted off) 45'
MF	7	(Tunisia) Fabien Camus
FW	17	(Belgium) Stein Huysegems		(substituted off) 61'
Substitutes:
GK	28	(Belgium) Thibaut Courtois
DF	2	(Belgium) Dimitri Daeseleire
DF	5	(Cameroon) Eric Matoukou		(substituted on) 61'
MF	20	(Hungary) Balázs Tóth
FW	11	(Netherlands) Istvan Bakx		(substituted on) 45'
FW	10	(Israel) Elyaniv Barda		(substituted on) 61'
FW	9	(Senegal) Moussa Koita
Manager:
(Belgium) Hein Vanhaezebrouck

MATCH RULES
- 90 minutes.
- No extra-time if scores still level, instead there will be a penalty shoot-out.
- 7 named substitutes.
- Maximum of 7 substitutions.

== See also ==
- 2009–10 Belgian Pro League
- 2009–10 Belgian Cup
