= Juan Aguilar =

Juan Aguilar may refer to:

- Juan Aguilar (footballer) (born 1989), Paraguayan footballer
- Juan Aguilar (boxer) (1943–2015), Argentine boxer
- Juan Carlos Aguilar (born 1998), British-born Canadian tennis player
