= George Blay =

Ghanaian footballer (1980–2026)

Personal information
- Date of birth: 7 August 1980
- Place of birth: Elmina, Ghana
- Date of death: 21 June 2026 (aged 45)
- Height: 1.74 m (5 ft 9 in)
- Position: Right-back

Senior career*
Years	Team	Apps	(Gls)
1996–1997	Sekondi Hasaacas		
1997–2002	Standard Liège	92	(3)
2002–2003	Mechelen	11	(0)
2003–2006	La Louviére	78	(0)
2006–2009	Dinamo București	66	(0)
2010	Internațional Curtea de Argeș	3	(0)
2010–2011	Unirea Urziceni	11	(0)
2011–2012	Royal Antwerp	19	(0)
Total		280	(3)

International career
1999	Ghana U20	5	(0)
2000–2002	Ghana	7	(1)
- * Club domestic league appearances and goals

George Blay (7 August 1980 – 21 June 2026) was a Ghanaian professional footballer who played as a right-back.

== Club career ==
Blay was born on 7 August 1980 in Elmina, Ghana and began playing football in 1996 at Sekondi Hasaacas. He went to play for Standard Liège, making his Belgian First Division debut under coach Aad de Mos on 31 August 1997 in a 3–0 away victory against Germinal Ekeren. On 29 August 1998, he scored his first goal by sealing a 3–0 home win over Eendracht Aalst. He spent a total of five seasons at Standard, reaching two Belgian Cup finals under coach Tomislav Ivić, but both were lost. Subsequently, Blay went for one season at Mechelen and in 2003 he joined La Louviére for three seasons. On 30 April 2006, Blay made his last Belgian First Division appearance in La Louviére's 2–2 home draw against Charleroi, having a total of 180 matches with three goals in the competition.

In 2006, Blay was transferred in Romania to Dinamo București, having been recommended by his former Standard teammate, Liviu Ciobotariu. He made his Liga I debut on 30 July 2006 in a 2–1 away victory against Național București, playing in his first season under coach Mircea Rednic in 31 out of 34 rounds as the club won the title. Blay also played 12 matches as the club reached the round of 32 in the 2006–07 UEFA Cup where they were eliminated with 3–1 on aggregate by Benfica. He started the following season by playing the entire match in the penalty shoot-out loss to Rapid București in the 2007 Supercupa României. The Red Dogs had the objective of reaching the Champions League group stage, with Blay appearing in both legs of the third qualifying round against Lazio Roma, which was eventually lost with 4–2 on aggregate. After three seasons with Dinamo, he went to play for a short while at Internațional Curtea de Argeș. Subsequently, Blay moved to Unirea Urziceni where on 4 May 2011 he made his last Liga I appearance in a 2–1 home win against Victoria Brănești, totaling 80 games in the competition.

In 2011, Blay signed with Royal Antwerp in the Belgian Second Division, where he was brought in to replace Bart Van Zundert. He retired at the end of the 2011–12 season. Blay has a total of 25 games with one goal in European competitions (including three appearances in the Intertoto Cup).

== International career ==
Blay made five appearances for Ghana's under-20 team in the 1999 World Youth Championship, helping the team reach the quarter-finals where they lost at the penalty shoot-out to eventual champions, Spain.

He played seven games and scored once for Ghana, making his debut under coach Giuseppe Dossena on 8 April 2000 in a 1–0 away victory against Tanzania during the 2002 World Cup qualifiers first round. His following game was a 5–0 home win over Sierra Leone in the 2002 World Cup qualifiers second round. In his third game, he scored his only goal for the national team in a 1–1 friendly draw against Algeria. Blay was selected by coach Fred Osam-Duodu to be part of Ghana's squad in the 2002 African Cup of Nations, playing in all three group stage games before the team's quarter-final 1–0 loss to Nigeria, in which he did not play. On 17 May 2002, Blay made his last appearance for The Black Stars in a 2–0 friendly loss to Slovenia.

== Death ==
Blay died on 21 June 2026, at the age of 45.

== Career statistics ==
=== International goals ===
Scores and results list Ghana's goal tally first. "Score" column indicates the score after each George Blay goal.

#	Date	Venue	Opponent	Score	Result	Competition
1.	5 December 2001	Stade du 5 Juillet, Algiers, Algeria	Algeria	1–0	1–1	Friendly

== Honours ==
Standard Liège

- Belgian Cup runner-up: 1998–99, 1999–00

Dinamo București

- Liga I: 2006–07
- Supercupa României runner-up: 2007
