= Sébastien Bruzzese =

Belgian footballer

Personal information
- Date of birth: 1 March 1989 (age 37)
- Place of birth: Liège, Belgium
- Height: 1.85 m (6 ft 1 in)
- Position: Goalkeeper

Youth career
- 2003–2007: RFC Liège
- 2007–2008: Anderlecht

Senior career*
Years	Team	Apps	(Gls)
2006–2007	RFC Liège	3	(0)
2008–2010	Anderlecht	0	(0)
2010–2012	Gent	3	(0)
2012–2015	Zulte Waregem	7	(0)
2015–2017	Club Brugge	19	(0)
2017–2017	→ Sint-Truidense (loan)	5	(0)
2017–2020	KV Kortrijk	39	(0)
2020–2024	Cercle Brugge	1	(0)

International career
2007–2008	Belgium U19	7	(0)
- * Club domestic league appearances and goals as of 13 April 2024

Sébastien Bruzzese (Italian pronunciation: [brutˈtseːze]; born 1 March 1989) is a Belgian footballer who plays as a goalkeeper.

== Career ==
Born in Liège, Bruzzese began his career with R.F.C. de Liège, who was promoted to the Belgian Third Division team and made his first three prof games. He moved in July 2007 to the reserve squad from Anderlecht and in August 2008 promoted to first squad, where he didn't play any first team matches. In the next season (2008/09), he was second keeper for a short while. First keeper Daniel Zitka was injured and first substitute Silvio Proto was loaned out to Germinal Beerschot.

At the end of January 2010, Bruzzese moved to Gent as it was unlikely he would get a chance to play at Anderlecht, being fifth keeper behind Silvio Proto, Daniel Zitka, Davy Schollen and Michaël Cordier. In the same period, he played seven caps for the Belgium national under-19 football team.

Bruzzese is sometimes compared to former keeper Christian Piot. He also owes a lot to Jacky Munaron, who made his transfer from Anderlecht to AA Gent possible. Munaron is a former keeper himself of Club Luik and Anderlecht.

On 31 January 2011 Bruzzese and his teammate Christophe Lepoint were involved in a serious car accident. Allegedly, they were returning from a night-club and that Bruzzese had been drinking, but this has never been confirmed.

Following the 2011–12 season, Bruzzese moved to Zulte Waregem.

== International ==
Bruzzese was born in Belgium and is of Italian descent. In 2007 and 2008, Bruzzese gained 7 caps for the Belgian under-19 team.

== Honours ==
Club Brugge

- Belgian Super Cup: 2016
