= Sinan Bolat =

Turkish footballer (born 1988)

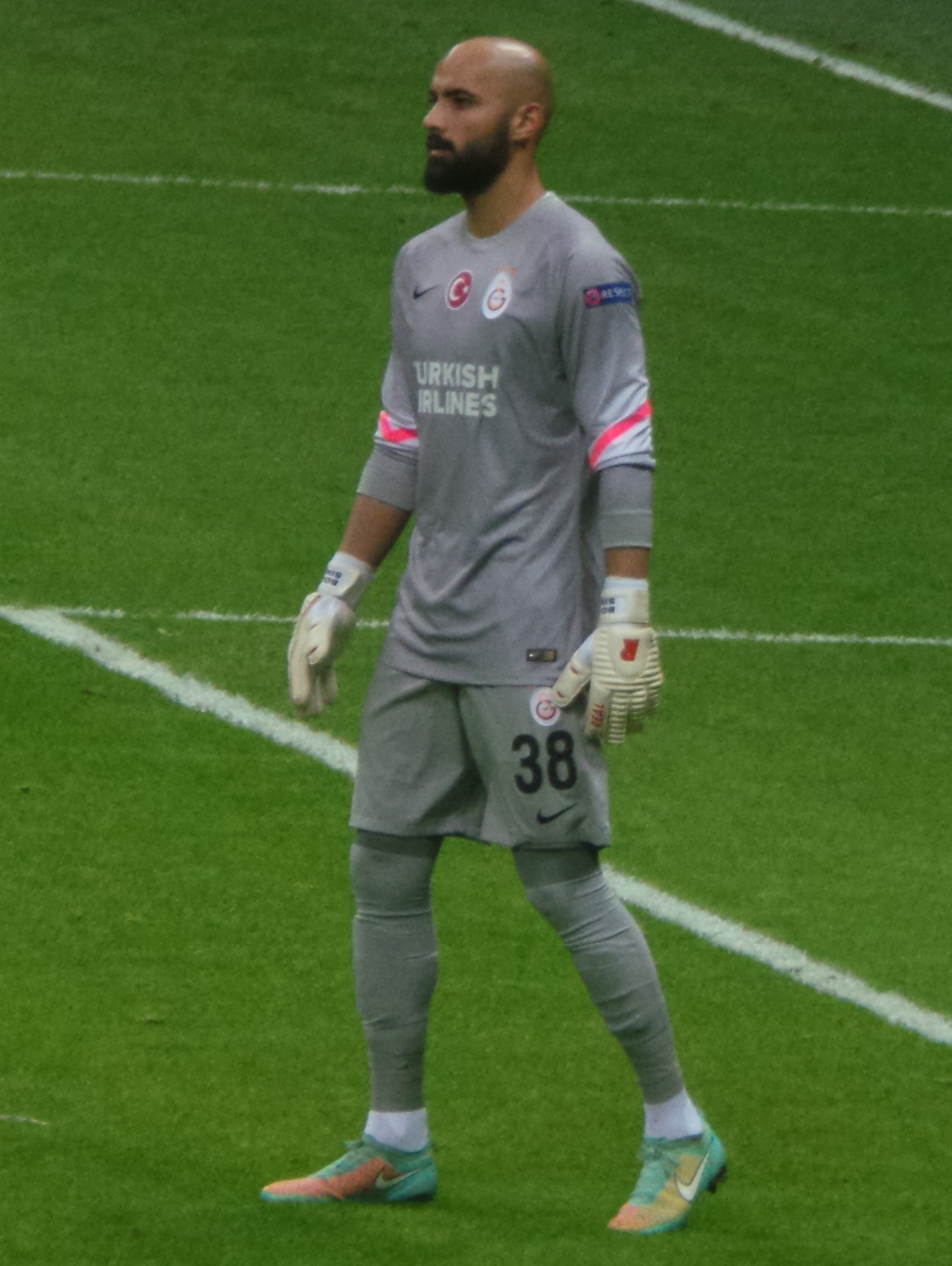
- Bolat with Galatasaray in 2014

Personal information
- Date of birth: 3 September 1988 (age 38)
- Place of birth: Kayseri, Turkey
- Height: 1.87 m (6 ft 2 in)
- Position: Goalkeeper

Youth career
- 1992–1996: FC Zonhoven
- 1996–2005: Genk

Senior career*
Years	Team	Apps	(Gls)
2005–2008	Genk	5	(0)
2009–2013	Standard Liège	96	(0)
2013–2017	Porto B	4	(0)
2013–2017	Porto	0	(0)
2014	→ Kayserispor (loan)	14	(0)
2014–2015	→ Galatasaray (loan)	2	(0)
2015–2016	→ Club Brugge (loan)	3	(0)
2016–2017	→ Nacional (loan)	0	(0)
2017	→ Arouca (loan)	13	(0)
2017–2020	Antwerp	105	(0)
2020–2022	Gent	58	(0)
2022–2025	Westerlo	78	(0)
2025	→ Kasımpaşa (loan)	2	(0)
2025–2026	Iğdır	14	(0)

International career
2004	Belgium U17	2	(0)
2007–2008	Turkey U19	4	(0)
2008–2009	Turkey U21	3	(0)
2009–2019	Turkey	12	(0)
- * Club domestic league appearances and goals as of 6 May 2026

Sinan Bolat (born 3 September 1988) is a Turkish professional footballer who plays as a goalkeeper. He has played for Turkey both at youth level and senior level.

== Club career ==
=== Early years ===
Bolat began his professional career at age 17 with Genk in 2005, but only managed a handful of matches in the league, including three starts. He transferred to Standard Liège on 29 December 2008, six months before his contract was due to expire with Genk. He had previously been linked to both Fenerbahçe and Trabzonspor of the Turkish Süper Lig.

=== Standard Liège ===
Bolat is reported to have moved to Standard Liège for a transfer fee of just €150,000 in the January 2009 transfer window, on a 4.5-year contract.

==== 2008–09 season ====
Bolat was Liège's preferred starting goalkeeper in the second half of the 2008–09 season due to Rorys Aragón losing favour. Bolat started the last seven matches of the season and kept five clean sheets, conceding only two goals: one in a 3–1 win against Germinal Beerschot and another in a 4–1 win against KV Mechelen. Bolat started the UEFA Cup match against S.C. Braga on 26 February 2009, and managed to keep a clean sheet during the first half. However, he was substituted off at half-time for the experienced Rorys Aragón, as the match finished 1–1.

In the final match of the 2008–09 season, Standard needed to win their match away to Gent in order to force a play-off against Anderlecht for the championship title. (If both points and number of matches won are tied, then a two-legged play-off decides the ultimate winner.) Standard were 1–0 ahead until the 92nd minute, when a penalty was awarded against them. Bolat became the hero of the night as he pulled off a magnificent save from Bryan Ruiz, ensuring the play-off. Standard went on to win the resulting play-off, winning 2–1 on aggregate, with Bolat keeping another clean sheet in the process, and were crowned champions on 24 May 2009. In his first season, he managed to keep six clean sheets out of nine matches and also saved a penalty. Winning the league automatically qualified Liège for the group stages of UEFA Champions League in the 2009–10 season. English Premier League clubs Manchester United and Arsenal were said to have made an offer for him in May 2009.

==== 2009–10 season ====
Prior to the start of the 2009–10 season, Bolat helped his side to a 2–0 win in the 2009 Belgian Supercup final against Genk on 27 July 2009. In Liège's final UEFA Champions League group stage match, against AZ on 9 December, Bolat pushed upfield when a free-kick was awarded in the 95th minute, and he scored a headed goal to tie the match at 1–1. The draw clinched third place in the group for Liège and gave them a place in the UEFA Europa League at the expense of AZ. This enabled Bolat to earn his place in history as the first goalkeeper ever to score a goal in open-play in the UEFA Champions League.

=== Porto ===
Bolat joined Portuguese Primeira Liga club Porto on 30 July 2013 on a free transfer, signing a five-year contract.

==== Kayserispor ====
On 24 January 2014, Bolat joined Turkish side Kayserispor on loan, for the remainder of the 2013–14 season.

==== Galatasaray ====
On 22 July 2014, Bolat joined Süper Lig club Galatasaray on a one-year loan.

==== Club Brugge ====
On 23 July 2015, Bolat joined Club Brugge on loan from Porto for the 2015–16 season, after Brugge starting goalkeeper Mathew Ryan left the side to join Valencia.

==== Nacional ====
Bolat joined Primeira Liga side Nacional on 31 August 2016, on a one-year loan.

==== Arouca ====
On 31 January 2017, Bolat left Nacional and joined Arouca on loan until the end of season, after only playing one game for Nacional.

=== Royal Antwerp ===
On 17 July 2017, Bolat returned to Belgium, joining Royal Antwerp on a three-year contract.

=== Gent ===
On 27 August 2020, Bolat joined rival Gent on a free transfer, signing a two-year contract.

=== Westerlo ===
On 2 June 2022, Westerlo announced the signing of Bolat, on a four-year contract. On 5 February 2025, Bolat was loaned to Kasımpaşa until the end of the 2024–25 season.

== International career ==
Bolat has played at youth level for Turkey, winning four caps at the under-19 level and three at the under-21 level. He was called up by the senior national team for Turkey by then-head coach Fatih Terim for 2010 FIFA World Cup qualification matches in September 2009, but was an unused substitute.

Bolat gained his first cap on 10 August 2011 in a friendly match against Estonia at Türk Telekom Arena, a 3–0 victory.

== Career statistics ==
As of match played 9 November 2024

Appearances and goals by club, season and competition
Club	Season	League			National cup (Note: Includes Croky Cup, Turkish Cup and Taça de Portugal)		League cup		Continental		Other		Total	
Club	Season	Division	Apps	Goals	Apps	Goals	Apps	Goals	Apps	Goals	Apps	Goals	Apps	Goals
Genk	2006–07	Belgian First Division	1	0	1	0	—		—		—		2	0
Genk	2007–08	Belgian First Division	4	0	0	0	—		0	0	—		4	0
Genk	Total		5	0	1	0	—		0	0	—		6	0
Standard Liège	2008–09	Belgian First Division	9	0	0	0	—		1 (Note: Appearance in UEFA Cup)	0	0	0	10	0
Standard Liège	2009–10	Belgian Pro League	31	0	1	0	—		12 (Note: Six appearances and one goal in UEFA Champions League, six appearances in UEFA Europa League)	1	1 (Note: Appearance in Belgian Super Cup)	0	45	1
Standard Liège	2010–11	Belgian Pro League	24	0	3	0	—		—		—		27	0
Standard Liège	2011–12	Belgian Pro League	32	0	2	0	—		13 (Note: Two appearances in UEFA Champions League, eleven appearances in UEFA Europa League)	0	1	0	48	0
Standard Liège	2012–13	Belgian Pro League	0	0	0	0	—		—		—		0	0
Standard Liège	Total		96	0	6	0	—		26	1	2	0	130	1
Porto B	2013–14	Segunda Liga	4	0	—		—		—		—		4	0
Porto	2013–14	Primeira Liga	0	0	0	0	0	0	0	0	0	0	0	0
Kayserispor (loan)	2013–14	Süper Lig	14	0	0	0	—		—		—		14	0
Galatasaray (loan)	2014–15	Süper Lig	2	0	9	0	—		1 (Note: Appearance(s) in UEFA Champions League)	0	0	0	12	0
Club Brugge (loan)	2015–16	Belgian Pro League	3	0	0	0	—		2 (Note: One appearance in UEFA Champions League, one appearance in UEFA Europa League)	0	0	0	5	0
Nacional (loan)	2016–17	Primeira Liga	0	0	0	0	1	0	—		—		1	0
Arouca (loan)	2016–17	Primeira Liga	13	0	0	0	0	0	0	0	—		13	0
Royal Antwerp	2017–18	Belgian First Division A	37	0	2	0	—		—		—		39	0
Royal Antwerp	2018–19	Belgian First Division A	41	0	1	0	—		—		—		42	0
Royal Antwerp	2019–20	Belgian First Division A	27	0	5	0	—		4 (Note: Appearance(s) in UEFA Europa League)	0	—		36	0
Royal Antwerp	Total		105	0	8	0	—		4	0	—		117	0
Gent	2020–21	Belgian First Division A	33	0	2	0	—		2	0	—		37	0
Gent	2021–22	Belgian First Division A	25	0	4	0	—		10 (Note: Appearance(s) in UEFA Europa Conference League)	0	—		39	0
Gent	Total		58	0	6	0	—		12	0	—		76	0
Westerlo	2022–23	Belgian Pro League	36	0	0	0	—		—		—		36	0
Westerlo	2023–24	Belgian Pro League	31	0	0	0	—		—		—		31	0
Westerlo	2024–25	Belgian Pro League	11	0	0	0	—		—		—		11	0
Westerlo	Total		78	0	0	0	—		—		—		78	0
Career total			378	0	30	0	1	0	45	1	2	0	495	1

== Honours ==
Standard Liège

- Belgian First Division A: 2008–09
- Belgian Cup: 2010–11
- Belgian Super Cup: 2009

Galatasaray

- Süper Lig: 2014–15
- Turkish Cup: 2014–15

Club Brugge

- Belgian First Division A: 2015–16

Gent

- Belgian Cup: 2021–22
