= Moussa Gueye =

Senegalese footballer

Personal information
- Date of birth: February 20, 1989 (age 37)
- Place of birth: Dakar, Senegal
- Height: 1.85 m (6 ft 1 in)
- Position: Striker

Team information
- Current team: Seraing United

Youth career
- –2007: Dakar Université Club

Senior career*
Years	Team	Apps	(Gls)
2007–2008	FC Brussels	9	(2)
2008–2010	Mons	46	(9)
2010–2012	SC Charleroi	43	(19)
2012–2014	FC Metz	21	(4)
2014	→ Académica de Coimbra (loan)	8	(2)
2014–	Seraing United	101	(40)

International career
2008–2010	Senegal U-23	12	(3)
- * Club domestic league appearances and goals as of 15:01, 29 April 2021 (UTC)

Moussa Gueye (born February 20, 1989) is a Senegalese football player currently playing for Seraing United.

== Career ==
On 27 November 2007 signed a four years contract with FC Brussels, but on 6 June 2008 left F.C. Molenbeek Brussels Strombeek and joined to Mons. On 16 June 2010 left Mons after two years in Mons, Belgium and signed with Royal Charleroi SC.

== International career ==
Gueye is former member of the Senegal national under-23 football team.
