= Sherif El Baily =

Egyptian-American footballer (born 1979)

Sherif El Bialy
Personal information
- Full name: Sherif Youssef El Bialy
- Date of birth: 22 September 1979 (age 47)
- Place of birth: Cairo, Egypt
- Height: 1.78 m (5 ft 10 in)
- Position: Midfielder

Youth career
- 2000–2003: Rutgers University

Senior career*
Years	Team	Apps	(Gls)
2003–2005	El Shams	17	(8)
2005–2007	Arab Contractors	49	(3)
2007–2008	El-Masry	14	
2008–2010	Lierse S.K.	48	(3)

International career
2006	Egypt	1	(0)
- * Club domestic league appearances and goals as of 31 July 2009

Sherif El Bialy (born 22 September 1979) is an Egyptian-American footballer who last played for Belgian First Division team Lierse S.K.

El Bialy played collegiate soccer for Rutgers University.

== Career ==
=== Youth ===
El Bialy played at El Shams S.C. since the age of 12. He was the leading scorer for all the youth teams until he was picked to play for the first team of the club at the age 16. El Bialy was a member of all youth national teams of Egypt. His talent caught the eyes of top clubs in Egypt including Al Ahly and Al-Zamalek who offers one million pound for El Bialy according to Al Ahram newspaper. In 1999, El Bialy left Egypt to play collegiate soccer in the United States .

=== College ===
El Bialy played college soccer at Rutgers University 2000–2003 on a full Athletic Scholarship. In his first year, El Bialy was named all-rookie team All Big East and Targum Athlete of the Year. El Bialy was named by the press the Egyptian Magician. In the second year, El Bialy was named All Big East First Team and was a finalist for All Big East Midfielder of the year. He was named second-team All Big East in his third year; and, all three years playing Rutgers Soccer El Bialy was named first-team All Mid-Atlantic Region Selection. In his second and third year he received an All American Honoree mention. El Bialy scored 20 Goals and 18 Assists in 56 games at Rutgers. El Bialy was invited to attend the 2003 MLS SuperDraft.

=== Professional ===
Shortly after graduating, El Bialy returned to Egypt to join El Shams S.C where he was the team captain, however, El Bialy left the club in late 2003 to go back to the United States. El Bialy moved to AlMokawaloon AlArab (Arab Contractors) in 2005. El Bialy shined in his first appearance with his new club. He was a member of the Egyptian National Team. He continued to play in the Egyptian Highest Division until 2008 when he signed for K. Lierse SK in Belgium with a transfer fee. In his first year at K. Lierse SK El Bialy helps the club to reach the semi-final of the Belgium Cup. Injuries shortened El Bialy's time on the field, he finishes his career champion of Belgium Exqi league

=== International ===
El Bialy made his debut for the Egypt national football team in a friendly against Uruguay on 16 August 2006. El Bialy was a member of the Egyptian U-20 and U-23. He scored in his debut with the U-20 against Lebanon November 1998.

=== Honors ===
Champions of the Belgium Exqi League 2009–10

League Champions 1997–98, El Shams S.C.

Champions African Cup in Tunisia 1998, U-20 Egypt
