= VfL 08 Vichttal =

- Founded: 2008
- Ground: Sportpark Dörenberg
- Capacity: 1200
- Chairman: Frank Donsbach
- League: Mittelrheinliga
- 2025–26: Oberliga Mittelrhein, 5th of 16
- Website: www.vichttal.de

VfL 08 Vichttal is a German professional football club based in Stolberg. Founded in 2008 from the merger of the VfL Zweifall and the VfB Vicht, the team has competed in the Mittelrheinliga since the 2017–18 season.

== History ==
VfL Zweifall and VfB Vicht were founded in 1927 and 1937, respectively, and primarily competed in lower-tier leagues. By June 2008, VfL Zweifall's first team secured the championship title in the Kreisliga B, earning promotion to the Kreisliga A. Concurrently, VfB Vicht, as champions of the Kreisliga A, narrowly missed promotion after losing a decisive playoff against the champion of another A-League group. This unique scenario led to the newly formed VfL 08 Vichttal fielding both its first and second teams in the unified Kreisliga A of the Aachen football district during the 2008/09 season—a situation permissible only at the district league level, as higher tiers restrict clubs to a single team.

The second team faced relegation to the Kreisliga B but achieved promotion back to the Kreisliga A in the 2015/16 season. The first team clinched the championship in the single-tier Kreisliga A, advancing to the Bezirksliga. In the 2016/17 season, both the A-Youth and B-Youth teams competed in the Bezirksliga, finishing eighth and fifth, respectively. In their second Bezirksliga season, the first team emerged as champions of District League 3 within the Middle Rhine Football Association, leading to their participation in the Middle Rhine Regional League starting from the 2011/12 season. In 2017, they concluded the regional league season as runners-up, securing a spot in the Middle Rhine League for the 2017/18 season.

== Sportpark ==
Since the summer of 2011, VfL 08 Vichttal has operated the Sportpark Dörenberg, a 20,000 m² facility featuring Stolberg's first artificial turf field and a smaller artificial turf practice field. To support this development, the club received a subsidy of €250,000 from the city of Stolberg during the merger. The facility incurs annual costs of approximately €15,000, which, according to the club, are financed through sponsors, donations, and loans.

Thanks to sustained growth in the youth sector, VfL 08 Vichttal has become the largest football club in Stolberg. Before the merger, the two clubs had a combined total of 400 members, which grew to nearly 700 after the merger. During the 2016/17 season, the club fielded 20 youth teams, three senior teams, and an "Old Boys" team. The club recorded its highest attendance during the 2016/17 Verbandspokal Round of 16 match against FC Viktoria Köln, which drew 800 spectators.

== Notable alumni ==
- Erdal Çelik (2014-2018), Defender
- Moritz Stehling (2015-2020), Goalkeeper
- Carlo Evertz (2017-2019), Belgian youth national team player
