= Mattia Notari =

Italian footballer (born 1979)

Personal information
- Date of birth: 20 May 1979 (age 47)
- Place of birth: Como, Italy
- Height: 1.90 m (6 ft 3 in)
- Position: Centre back

Senior career*
Years	Team	Apps	(Gls)
1998–1999	Atletico Catania	18	(0)
1999–2002	Novara	57	(0)
2002–2010	Mantova	256	(1)
2010–2011	Lierse	3	(0)
2012–2013	Castiglione	32	(0)
- * Club domestic league appearances and goals

Mattia Notari (born 20 May 1979) is an Italian former football player who played as a centre back. He played for Lierse SK from Belgium. He signed a contract at Mantova F.C. after leaving Novara Calcio.
