= Jeroen Appeltans =

Belgian footballer

Personal information
- Date of birth: 27 August 1990 (age 36)
- Place of birth: Sint-Truiden, Belgium
- Height: 1.86 m (6 ft 1 in)
- Position: Midfielder

Team information
- Current team: Herk FC

Youth career
- 1995–2000: K.W.S. Alken
- 2000–2006: STVV

Senior career*
Years	Team	Apps	(Gls)
2006–2011	STVV	21	(0)
2010	→ K.V.K. Tienen (loan)	7	(0)
2011	→ KSC Grimbergen (loan)	10	(2)
2011–2013	Herk FC		
2013–2014	KESK Leopoldsburg	29	(5)
2014–2018	Thes Sport		
2018–	Herk FC		
- * Club domestic league appearances and goals

Jeroen Appeltans (born 27 August 1990) is a professional footballer who plays for Herk FC.

== Career ==
He made his debut for STVV as a replacement in the 2006–2007 season against Lierse at the age of 16. He only saw action twice during this season. In the 2007–2008 season he suffered a muscle injury. In 2008–2009 he played five times. The midfielder played in the Season 2010/2011 on loan for K.V.K. Tienen and KSC Grimbergen from STVV out Sint-Truiden.
