= Anduele Pryor =

Dutch footballer (born 1985)

Personal information
- Date of birth: 26 April 1985 (age 41)
- Place of birth: Paramaribo, Suriname
- Height: 1.83 m (6 ft 0 in)
- Position: Attacking midfielder

Senior career*
Years	Team	Apps	(Gls)
2006–2010	Vitesse	51	(6)
2010	→ Roeselare (loan)	5	(0)
2011–2012	Bayern Munich II	7	(0)
- * Club domestic league appearances and goals as of 23 June 2012

Anduele Pryor (born 26 April 1985), also spelled Prijor, is a Suriname-born retired Dutch footballer, who played as an attacking midfielder in the top tier of Dutch and Belgian football.

Pryor made his debut in professional football being part of the Vitesse squad in the 2006–07 season. He played 51 league games for Vitesse, in which he scored 6 goals. In 2010, Vitesse put Pryor on loan at the Belgian-side Roeselare. Vitesse then released Pryor. In 2011, Pryor joined the Bayern Munich reserves. After being released at the end of the 2011–12 season, he trialled with SC Veendam in July 2012 and FC Emmen in January 2013.
