= Carlo Evertz =

Belgian footballer (born 1990)

Personal information
- Full name: Carlo Evertz
- Date of birth: 1 August 1990 (age 36)
- Place of birth: Aachen, Germany
- Height: 1.76 m (5 ft 9 1/2 in)
- Position: Midfielder

Senior career*
Years	Team	Apps	(Gls)
2008–2010	Eupen	26	(2)
2010–2015	Sint-Truiden	7	(0)
2013–2015	→ La Calamine (loan)		
2015–2016	La Calamine		
2016–2017	Wiltz 71		
2017–2018	Vichttal		
2018–	Raeren-Eynatten		
- * Club domestic league appearances and goals as of 16 May 2011

Carlo Evertz (born 1 August 1990 in Germany) is a professional football midfielder who plays for Raeren-Eynatten in the Belgian Division 3.
