= Zakaria Gueye =

Senegalese footballer

Personal information
- Date of birth: 22 February 1986 (age 40)
- Place of birth: Senegal
- Height: 1.85 m (6 ft 1 in)
- Position: Midfielder

Youth career
- 2003–2005: Oissel

Senior career*
Years	Team	Apps	(Gls)
2005–2008	Oissel		
2008–2010	Pacy-sur-Eure	54	(5)
2010–2011	Zulte Waregem	5	(0)
2011	→ Fréjus Saint-Raphaël (loan)	16	(2)
2012	Oissel		
2012–2013	Quevilly-Rouen	17	(0)
2013–2015	Oissel		
2016–2017	Oissel		
- * Club domestic league appearances and goals

Zakaria Gueye (born 22 February 1986 in Senegal) is a Senegalese former professional footballer who played as a midfielder.

Gueye previously played for CMS Oissel, Pacy Vallée-d'Eure Football, Belgian Pro League club SV Zulte Waregem, and Fréjus Saint-Raphaël.
