= Mark Volders =

Belgian footballer

Personal information
- Date of birth: 13 April 1977 (age 49)
- Place of birth: Xanten, Germany
- Height: 1.89 m (6 ft 2 in)
- Position: Goalkeeper

Youth career
- 1993–1998: KTH Diest
- 1998–1999: K.R.C. Genk

Senior career*
Years	Team	Apps	(Gls)
1999–2000	K.F.C. Dessel Sport	0	(0)
2000–2003	K.F.C. Lommel S.K.	42	(0)
2003–2004	K.F.C. Verbroedering Geel	10	(0)
2004–2005	K.S.K. Beveren	23	(0)
2005–2006	RBC Roosendaal	30	(0)
2006–2010	R.E. Mouscron	93	(0)
2010–2012	STVV	5	(0)
- * Club domestic league appearances and goals as of 17 May 2011

Mark Volders (born 13 April 1977 in Xanten) is a Belgian football goalkeeper.
