= Vuza Nyoni =

Zimbabwean footballer (born 1984)

Vusa Nyoni
Personal information
- Full name: Vusumuzi Nyoni
- Date of birth: 21 April 1984 (age 42)
- Place of birth: Bulawayo, Zimbabwe
- Height: 1.78 m (5 ft 10 in)
- Position: Winger

Team information
- Current team: KVC Ardooie
- Number: 12

Youth career
- Highlanders

Senior career*
Years	Team	Apps	(Gls)
2001–2005	Amazulu		
2005	Highlanders		
2006–2010	Cercle Brugge	113	(7)
2010–2012	Beerschot	21	(1)
2013–2015	Mons	44	(0)
2017–2018	Mandel United		
2018–2019	SC Dikkelvenne		
2020–2021	KVK Westhoek	4	(0)
2021–2023	KFC Poperinge	60	(21)
2023–	KVC Ardooie	29	(2)

International career
2004	Zimbabwe	18	(5)
- * Club domestic league appearances and goals as of 14:56, 23 June 2024 (UTC)

Vusumuzi "Vuza" Nyoni (born 21 April 1984) is a Zimbabwean professional footballer who plays as a winger for Belgian side KVC Ardooie.

He is nicknamed Prince.

== Career ==
Nyoni was born in Bulawayo. He was discovered at his team Highlanders FC by scouts of Premier League side Blackburn Rovers. Cercle Brugge, co-operating with Blackburn Rovers, offered Nyoni a trial because they needed a replacement for Brian Pinas who was sold to NAC Breda. A few weeks later, Vusumuzi Nyoni signed a contract for six months. This contract has already been prolonged with two years.

Nyoni currently lives together with his teammate Honour Gombami in a flat in Bruges. It was Nyoni who recommended Gombami at Cercle, and they both recommended Obadiah Tarumbwa. Nyoni is the son of Highlanders gifted left back Dumisani "Savimbi" Nyoni, who played during the famous Bulawayo club's heyday in the mid eighties.

On Wednesday 25 August 2010 Nyoni signed a three-year contract with Germinal Beerschot. After spells at Belgian clubs Mons, KFC Mandel United (formerly KFC Izegem) and SC Dikkelvenne, Nyoni signed for another Belgian club, KVK Westhoek, in the summer 2020. A year later, in the summer 2021, Nyoni signed with KFC Poperinge.

In June 2023, 39-year old Nyoni signed for Belgian side KVC Ardooie.

== Honours ==
Zimbabwe

- Afro-Asian Games bronze medal: 2003
