= Thomas De Corte =

Belgian footballer

Personal information
- Full name: Thomas De Corte
- Date of birth: 31 March 1988 (age 38)
- Place of birth: Erps-Kwerps, Belgium
- Height: 1.80 m (5 ft 11 in)
- Position: Right back

Youth career
- OH Leuven
- Anderlecht

Senior career*
Years	Team	Apps	(Gls)
2006–2010	Lierse	44	(0)
2009–2010	→ Lyra (loan)	19	(1)
2010–2011	Antwerp	16	(0)
2011–2013	AGOVV	18	(0)
2013–2014	Oosterzonen		
2014–2017	Houtvenne		
2017–2019	FC Berlaar-Heikant		
- * Club domestic league appearances and goals

Thomas De Corte (born 31 March 1988) is a Belgian former professional footballer who played as a right back. He formerly played for Lierse and AGOVV.

== Football career ==
De Corte joined the first team of Lierse in late-2005. He made his breakthrough in the second half of the 2005–06 season at the right back position. Due to an injury, De Corte was soon sidelined. Subsequently, he was sent on loan to another club in Lier; Lyra. After his stint at Lyra, De Corte signed with Royal Antwerp in the Belgian Second Division. In the 2011–12 season, De Corte moved to Dutch second-tier Eerste Divisie club AGOVV after a successful trial. At the beginning of 2013, that club went bankrupt. De Corte then played for amateur clubs Oosterzonen, Houtvenne and FC Berlaar-Heikant.
