= Jonathan Mendes =

French footballer (born 1989)

Personal information
- Full name: Jonathan Mendes
- Date of birth: 19 July 1989 (age 37)
- Place of birth: Décines-Charpieu, France
- Height: 1.87 m (6 ft 1 1/2 in)
- Position: Defender

Team information
- Current team: Beauvais

Youth career
- 2003–2006: Lyon

Senior career*
Years	Team	Apps	(Gls)
2006–2007	Lyon	16	(3)
2007–2008	Auxerre B	21	(1)
2008–2011	Standard Liège	0	(0)
2010–2011	→ Tubize (loan)	12	(0)
2011–2012	Getafe B	26	(3)
2012–	Beauvais		
- * Club domestic league appearances and goals

Jonathan Mendes (born 19 July 1989) is a French footballer.

== Career ==
He was trained at the youth academy of Olympique Lyonnais before moving to AJ Auxerre and played some matches for the reserve team. He joined Standard de Liège in June 2009 and was loaned out in January 2010 to AFC Tubize. He made his professional debut for AFC Tubize on 6 February 2010 against KV Turnhout in the EXQI League and was loaned again on 16 May 2010 for one season to AFC Tubize.
