= Masis Voskanyan =

Armenian footballer

Personal information
- Date of birth: 11 July 1990 (age 36)
- Place of birth: Abovyan, Armenian SSR, Soviet Union
- Height: 1.82 m (6 ft 0 in)
- Position: Midfielder

Team information
- Current team: Torhout

Senior career*
Years	Team	Apps	(Gls)
2009–2010	Club Brugge	0	(0)
2010–2014	Roeselare	84	(1)
2014–2015	Pyunik	13	(0)
2015–2016	Coxyde	19	(0)
2016–2024	Sint-Eloois-Winkel	129	(1)
2024–2025	Roeselare	23	(0)
2026–	Torhout	0	(0)

International career
2009–2010	Armenia U17	5	(0)
2010–2011	Armenia U19	9	(0)
2009–2012	Armenia U21	13	(0)
2012–2014	Armenia	2	(0)
- * Club domestic league appearances and goals as of 21 January 2026

Masis Voskanyan (Armenian: Մասիս Ոսկանյան; born 11 July 1990) is an Armenian professional footballer who plays as a midfielder for Torhout.

== Club career ==
Born in Abovyan, Armenian SSR, Voskanyan moved to Belgium with his family at the age of three. During his first years of playing football, he represented Belgian clubs KS Veurne, Club Brugge and Roeselare. In 2014, he returned to Armenia to play for Pyunik where he won the domestic double, but he returned to Belgium after one season where he began playing for Coxyde. He only played one season there before moving to Sint-Eloois-Winkel in 2016.

== International career ==
Between 2009 and 2010, Voskanyan played for the Armenian under-17 national team. In 2010, Voskanyan played for the Armenian under-19 national team, appearing in qualifying matches for the 2010 UEFA European Under-19 Football Championship. His debut was on 4 September 2009, in a home game against Switzerland, which ended with a 1–3 defeat.

Voskanyan made his debut for the Armenian senior team in 2012.

== Honours ==
Pyunik

- Armenian Premier League: 2014–15
- Armenian Cup: 2014–15
