= Wouter Scheelen =

Belgian footballer

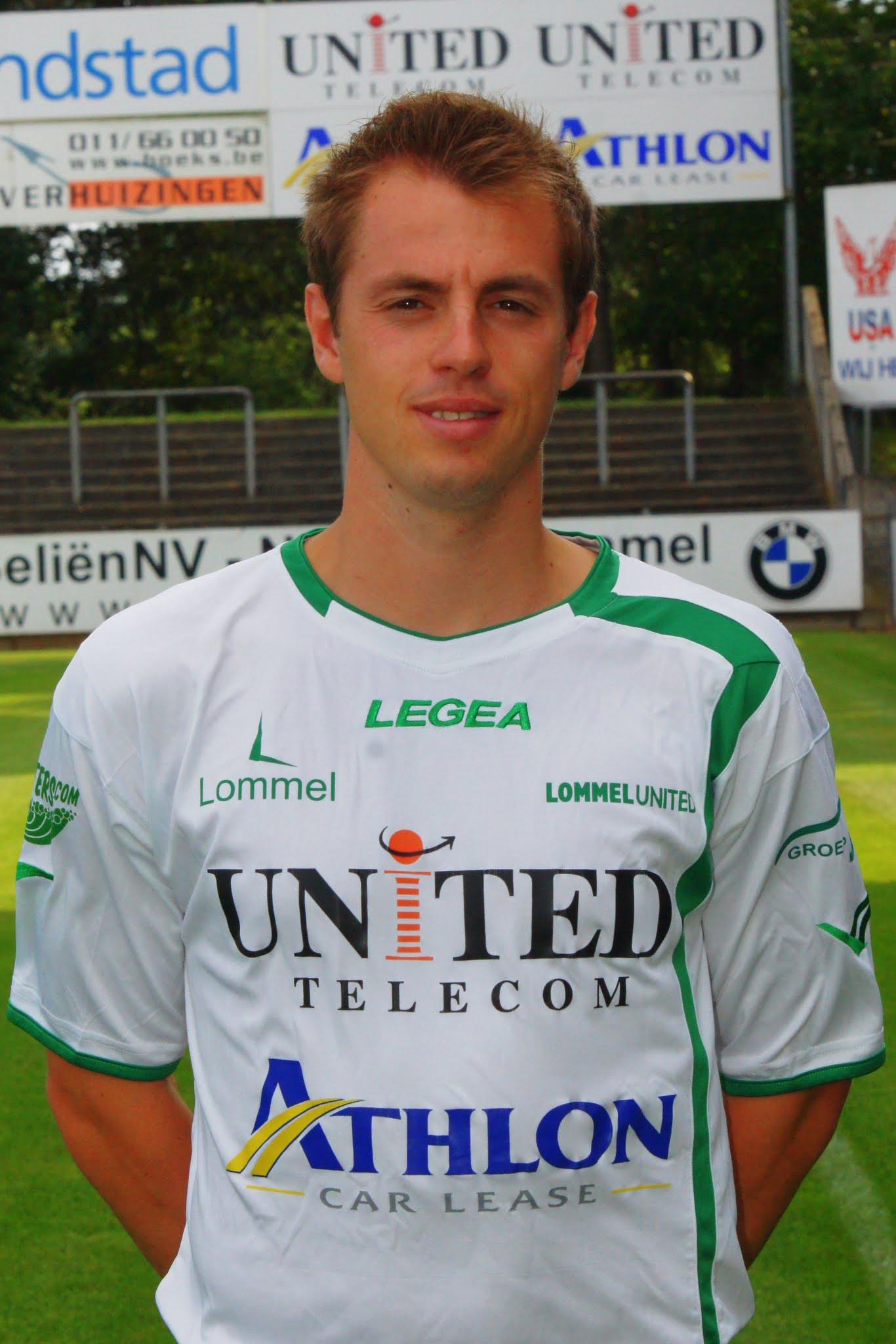

Personal information
- Date of birth: 16 October 1985 (age 41)
- Place of birth: Hasselt, Belgium
- Height: 1.72 m (5 ft 7 1/2 in)
- Position: Left winger

Team information
- Current team: Bocholt

Youth career
- KVSK United

Senior career*
Years	Team	Apps	(Gls)
2003–2006	KVSK United	83	(18)
2006–2012	Westerlo	62	(3)
2008	→ KVSK United (loan)	14	(4)
2010	→ KVSK United (loan)	10	(0)
2010–2011	→ Oud-Heverlee Leuven (loan)	31	(7)
2011–2012	→ Fortuna Sittard (loan)	32	(5)
2012–2018	Lommel United	112	(19)
2018–	Bocholt	0	(0)
- * Club domestic league appearances and goals as of 2 January 2016

Wouter Scheelen (born 16 October 1985) is a Belgian football player currently playing for Bocholt in the Belgian Second Amateur Division.
