= Emil Lyng =

Danish footballer (born 1989)

Personal information
- Full name: Emil Sigvardsen Lyng
- Date of birth: 3 August 1989 (age 37)
- Place of birth: Kolding, Denmark
- Height: 1.90 m (6 ft 3 in)
- Positions: Forward; winger

Youth career
- Kolding FC
- Kolding IF
- AGF

Senior career*
Years	Team	Apps	(Gls)
2008	AGF	0	(0)
2008–2011	Lille	5	(0)
2010	→ Zulte Waregem (loan)	14	(1)
2011	→ Nordsjælland (loan)	4	(1)
2011–2012	Lausanne-Sport	5	(0)
2013–2016	Esbjerg fB	48	(4)
2016–2017	Silkeborg IF	18	(0)
2017–2018	KA	20	(9)
2018	Dundee United	6	(0)
2018	Haladás	2	(0)
2019	Valur	10	(1)
2020–2021	Middelfart Boldklub	20	(3)
Total		152	(19)

International career
2008	Denmark U20	1	(0)
2009–2011	Denmark U21	8	(2)
- * Club domestic league appearances and goals

Emil Sigvardsen Lyng (born 3 August 1989) is a Danish former professional footballer who played as a winger and a forward.

== Career ==
Lyng began his youth career playing for Kolding FC, but later moved to city rival Kolding IF and played there until he was picked up by AGF Aarhus. In January 2008 he was promoted to the AGF first team, but never got his Danish League debut for the club before he was sold to Lille OSC in the summer of 2008. He made his senior debut for Lille on 18 October 2008 against Lyon. On 27 January 2010 Zulte Waregem signed the Danish forward on loan from Lille for 6 months.

On 7 February 2010 he got his debut at home against Club Bruges in the Jupiler League, playing as center forward. Lyng showed great composure in front of goal, as he headed his team into the lead. On 26 January 2011, Emil Lyng joined Danish club FC Nordsjælland on loan for the rest of the 2010–11 season, making 4 appearances and scoring 1 goal.

Lyng was allowed to leave Lille on a free transfer during the 2011 summer transfer window to join Swiss side Lausanne-Sports, where he signed a two-year contract and was given the number 28 shirt. He subsequently played for Danish clubs Esbjerg fB and Silkeborg IF, and had a spell with Icelandic side KA, before moving to Scottish Championship side Dundee United on a short-term deal in January 2018. He scored his first goal for his new club later that month in a Scottish Cup tie against Alloa Athletic, which United won 2–0. Lyng was released in May 2018, following the end of his contract.

On 23 January 2020, Lyng joined Middelfart G&BK in the Danish 2nd Division. He announced his retirement from football after the 2020–21 season.

After his career, he became a football agent.

== Career statistics ==
Appearances and goals by club, season and competition
Club	Season	League			National Cup		League Cup		Other		Total	
Club	Season	Division	Apps	Goals	Apps	Goals	Apps	Goals	Apps	Goals	Apps	Goals
Lille	2008–09	Ligue 1	4	0	0	0	0	0	—		4	0
Lille	2009–10	Ligue 1	0	0	0	0	0	0	0	0	0	0
Lille	2010–11	Ligue 1	1	0	0	0	0	0	0	0	1	0
Lille	Total		5	0	0	0	0	0	0	0	5	0
Lille II	2010–11	CFA	7	2	—		—		—		7	2
Zulte Waregem (loan)	2009–10	Belgian Pro League	14	1	0	0	—		—		14	1
Nordsjælland (loan)	2010–11	Superligaen	4	1	0	0	—		0	0	4	1
Lausanne-Sport	2011–12	Swiss Super League	5	0	0	0	—		—		5	0
Esbjerg	2012–13	Superligaen	1	0	1	0	—		—		2	0
Esbjerg	2013–14	Superligaen	17	2	1	0	—		8 (Note: Appearances in the Europa League)	0	26	2
Esbjerg	2014–15	Superligaen	18	2	3	1	—		2	0	23	3
Esbjerg	2015–16	Superligaen	12	0	0	0	—		—		12	0
Esbjerg	Total		48	4	5	1	—		10	0	63	5
Silkeborg	2016–07	Superligaen	18	0	0	0	—		—		18	0
KA	2017	Úrvalsdeild karla	20	9	1	0	—		—		21	9
Dundee United	2017–18	Scottish Championship	1	0	1	1	—		—		2	1
Szombathelyi Haladás	2018–19	Nemzeti Bajnokság I	2	0	0	0	—		—		2	0
Career total			124	17	6	1	0	0	10	0	140	18

== Honours ==
Esbjerg fB

- Danish Cup: 2012–13
