= Olivier Mukendi =

Congolese-Belgian footballer

Personal information
- Full name: Olivier Mukendi Mulaya
- Date of birth: 8 June 1991 (age 35)
- Place of birth: Kinshasa, Zaire
- Height: 1.94 m (6 ft 4 in)
- Position: Forward

Team information
- Current team: Syra Mensdorf
- Number: 20

Youth career
- 1996–2006: Union SG
- 2006–2009: Anderlecht

Senior career*
Years	Team	Apps	(Gls)
2008–2012	Anderlecht	1	(0)
2010	→ Cercle Brugge (loan)	0	(0)
2011	→ Union SG (loan)	11	(4)
2011–2012	→ Union SG (loan)	20	(6)
2012–2013	La Louvière Centre	4	(0)
2013–2022	Jeunesse Canach	109	(33)
2022–	Syra Mensdorf		

International career
2007–2009	Belgium U18	4	(1)
- * Club domestic league appearances and goals as of 2 February 2026

Olivier Mukendi Mulaya (born 8 June 1991) is a Congolese-Belgian professional footballer who plays as a forward for Syra Mensdorf.

== Career ==
Mukendi began his career in the youth from R. Union Saint-Gilloise and then joined Anderlecht, he trained first in the season 2007/2008 with the Jupiler League team from Anderlecht. He played his first profi game on 26 March 2009 against K.F.C. Germinal Beerschot for Anderlecht in the Jupiler League, he was the second youngest player in the playerpool for that game, the youngest being Romelu Lukaku. He is currently the top goalscorer in the reserve team from Anderlecht, he scored fifteen goals for the team, Mukendi is also the captain. On 26 May 2010 the 19-year-old forward extended his contract with RSC Anderlecht until 30 June 2012 and announced his movement on loan to Cercle Brugge.

== International career ==
Mukendi presented Belgium on U-18 Level he played his first game 2007 and holds current four games, who scores one goal.
