= Cédric Ciza =

Burundian footballer

Personal information
- Full name: Cédric Ciza
- Date of birth: 2 February 1990 (age 36)
- Place of birth: Bujumbura, Burundi
- Height: 1.70 m (5 ft 7 in)
- Position: Midfielder

Team information
- Current team: R.S.C. Anderlecht

Youth career
- 2000–2004: F.C. Ganshoren
- 2004–2007: R.S.C. Anderlecht

Senior career*
| Years | Team | Apps | (Gls) |
| 2008– | R.S.C. Anderlecht | 1 | (0) |
| 2009 | → MVV Maastricht (loan) | 0 | (0) |
| 2010 | → R. Charleroi S.C. (loan) | 7 | (1) |

International career^{‡}
| 2005–2006 | Belgium U16 | 17 | (0) |
| 2006–2007 | Belgium U17 | 11 | (0) |
| 2008 | Belgium U18 | 4 | (0) |
| 2008 | Belgium U19 | 5 | (0) |
| 2010 | Belgium U20 | 1 | (0) |
- * Club domestic league appearances and goals ‡ National team caps and goals as of 13:44, 24 March 2013 (UTC)

Cédric Ciza (born 2 February 1990 in Bujumbura) is a Burundian footballer who plays for R.S.C. Anderlecht.

== Career ==
Ciza began his career with F.C. Ganshoren and was in summer 2004 scouted from R.S.C. Anderlecht. He left than in summer 2009 the Belgium club R.S.C. Anderlecht and signed in the Netherlands a loan deal with MVV Maastricht. In December 2009 returned to RSC Anderlecht and joined after his return to the league rival Charleroi SC.

== International career ==
Ciza was in the Squad from Belgium U-17 for the U-17 EM in Belgium 2007.
