= Moussa Koita =

French-Senegalese footballer (born 1982)

Moussa Koïta
Personal information
- Full name: Moussa Koïta
- Date of birth: 19 November 1982 (age 43)
- Place of birth: Saint-Denis, France
- Height: 1.93 m (6 ft 4 in)
- Position: Striker

Youth career
- 1998–2000: St. Denis US
- 2000–2001: Red Star 93

Senior career*
Years	Team	Apps	(Gls)
2001–2002	St. Denis US	25	(20)
2002–2004	Thaon	30	(19)
2004–2005	Mulhouse	20	(15)
2005–2006	Vauban Strasbourg	21	(9)
2006–2007	Schiltigheim	25	(6)
2007–2009	Virton	63	(31)
2009–2010	Genk	20	(4)
2010	→ R. Charleroi (loan)	3	(0)
2010–2011	Chernomorets Burgas	22	(2)
2011–2012	Olympiakos Nicosia	21	(1)
Total		250	(107)
- * Club domestic league appearances and goals as of 30 April 2012

Moussa Koïta (born 19 November 1982) is a former French-Senegalese footballer who played as a striker.

== Career ==
After just one year and 25 games, he scored six goals with SC Schiltigheim in the Championnat de France Amateurs and left the club and signed a contract with R.E. Virton. On 12 June 2009 K.R.C. Genk signed the Franco-Senegalese forward from R.E. Virton on a two-year deal. In February 2010, R. Charleroi S.C. loaned him for the remainder of the season, while Orlando moved to Genk. Koita signed with Bulgarian Chernomorets Burgas for two years on 31 August 2010. He made his team début on 13 September in an 0–0 A PFG match against OFC Sliven 2000. In July 2011, he was released from the club. In August 2011, he signed for Cypriot First Division club, Olympiakos Nicosia for 1 year.

== Schools ==
2005-2006 : University NANCY-METZ galiléé

2001 - 2003 : University PARIS 13

1997 - 2001: Lycée Paul Eluard in Saint Denis

1993 - 1997: Collége Fabien
