= Moussa Traoré (footballer, born 1990) =

Ivorian-Burkinabé footballer

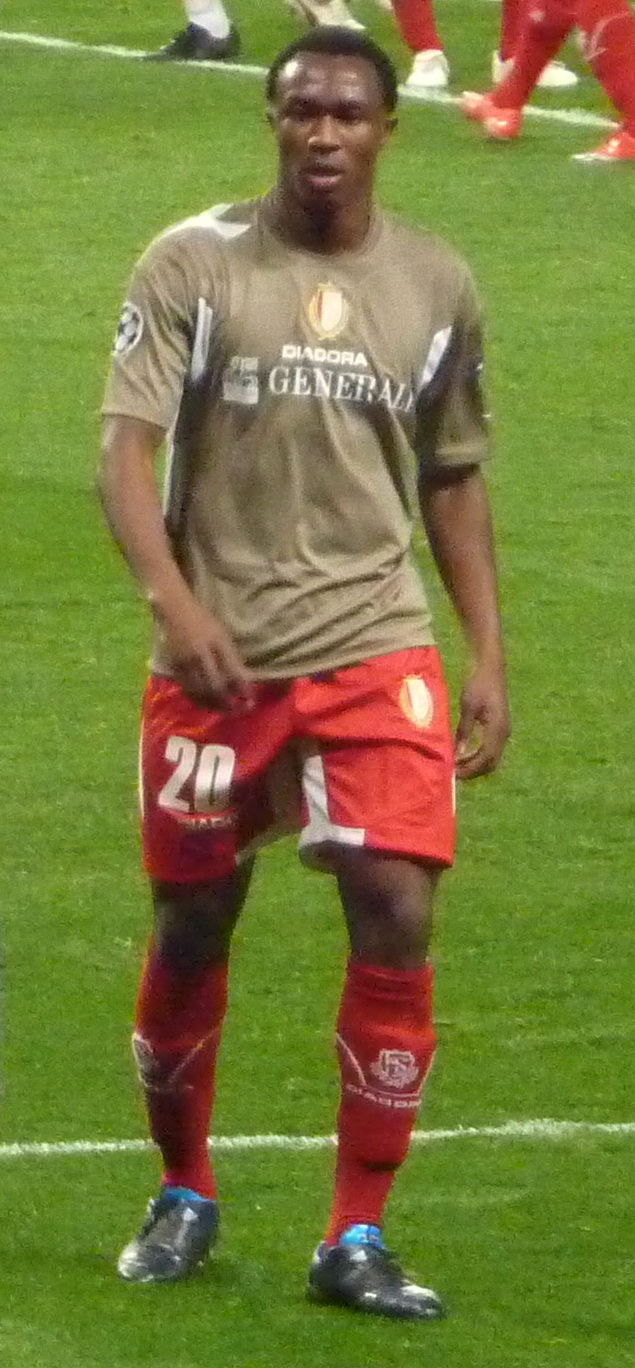

Personal information
- Full name: Moussa Traoré
- Date of birth: March 9, 1990 (age 36)
- Place of birth: Abidjan, Ivory Coast
- Height: 1.84 m (6 ft 1/2 in)
- Position: Forward

Team information
- Current team: Braine

Youth career
- Commune FC

Senior career*
Years	Team	Apps	(Gls)
2007–2010	Commune FC		
2008–2009	→ Planète Champion (loan)		
2009–2010	→ Standard Liège (loan)	22	(1)
2010–2013	Standard Liège		
2010–2011	→ Zulte Waregem (loan)	17	(4)
2013–2014	Hoogstraten	28	(7)
2014–2016	WS Bruxelles	24	(4)
2016	Siah Jamegan	9	(0)
2017–2019	Tubize	33	(2)
2019–2020	RWDM	11	(0)
2021–2023	Rebecq	47	(18)
2023	RSD Jette	6	(4)
2024–	Braine		

International career
2014	Burkina Faso	1	(0)
- * Club domestic league appearances and goals as of 9 February 2022

Moussa Traoré (born 10 April 1990) is a professional footballer who plays as a forward for Braine. Born in Ivory Coast, he has represented Burkina Faso internationally. He has scored over 15 goals in his career and made over 50 appearances. In his time playing he has played for Belgium and Burkina Faso clubs.

== Career ==
Traoré began his career with Commune FC and was loaned out to Planète Champion in the 2008–09 season. He was loaned out on 2 July 2009 from Commune FC to Belgian top club Standard Liège, with one-year-loan deal plus a sell option. After his return to Commune FC, Standard pulled the sold option, and loaned him one day later for one season to SV Zulte Waregem.

In 2009 his team made it second in group B for Europa League playoff but didn't qualify. He would go on to win 2009 Belgian Super Cup 2-0 winning his first trophy.

In 2010 he would make it to the 2010 championship playoff making second place.

On 6 November 2019, Traoré joined RWDM47 on a deal for the rest of the season.

After playing for different team in the Belgian Pro League he met with the president and the coach who seduced him with their project in addition, they claim Rebecq is a family club.

In 2022 Traore was absent for weeks but later came back to play in August, during which he celebrated a triplet.

On July 3, 2023, he was offered a free transfer into RSD Jette in which his contract will expire on June 30, 2024.

=== Team performances ===
In 2009 he was part of the team that came 8th made it second to Europa League but didn't qualify.

== Personal life ==
The Ivorian-born Traoré holds a Burkinabé passport. He is 6 foot and has been playing in Belgium for most of his career. He prefers his right foot and weighs 79 kg. His jersey number is 10.

== Honours ==
Standard Liège

- Belgian Super Cup: 2009
