= Edouard Kabamba =

Belgian footballer

Édouard Kabamba
Personal information
- Full name: Edouard Kabamba-Wenze
- Date of birth: 24 January 1987 (age 39)
- Place of birth: Kinshasa, Zaire
- Height: 1.79 m (5 ft 10 in)
- Position: Forward

Youth career
- 2003–2007: Standard Liège

Senior career*
Years	Team	Apps	(Gls)
2007–2011	Standard Liège	5	(0)
2008–2009	→ Real Madrid Castilla (loan)	0	(0)
2009–2010	→ Eupen (loan)	2	(0)
2011	Melilla		
- * Club domestic league appearances and goals

Édouard Kabamba-Wenze (born 24 January 1987 in Kinshasa, Democratic Republic of the Congo) is a Belgian footballer, who last played for Melilla.

== Club career ==
=== Standard Liège ===
Kabamba has been with Standard Liège since 2003. He debuted for the Liège club in February 2007 for the Belgian Pro League and on 9 August 2008 in the Belgian Super Cup against RSC Anderlecht from the municipality of Anderlecht in central Belgium.

=== Real Madrid ===
During the 2008–2009 season, he played as a striker on loan for Real Madrid Castilla, the reserve team of Real Madrid CF, where he played 2 games for the Castilla, scoring 0 goals. On average, he played 76 minutes per game in 37 games. He received five yellow cards and zero red cards.

== Position ==
Kabamba is a versatile player he can play as right wing, left wing or midfielder.

== Statistics ==
Season	Club	Country	Competition	Matches	Goals	Yellow card	Red card
2008–09	Real Madrid Castilla	Spain	Segunda División B	2	0	5	0

== Honours ==
=== Club ===
Standard Liège

- Belgian Pro League: 2007–08
- Belgian Supercup: 2008
