= Luigi Pieroni =

Belgian footballer (born 1980)

Personal information
- Date of birth: 8 September 1980 (age 46)
- Place of birth: Liège, Belgium
- Height: 1.87 m (6 ft 2 in)
- Position: Forward

Team information
- Current team: Raja CA (assistant)

Youth career
- 1988–1991: RFC Montegnee
- 1991–1993: Liège
- 1993–1998: Standard Liège

Senior career*
Years	Team	Apps	(Gls)
1998–1999	Standard Liège	0	(0)
1999–2003	Liège	96	(28)
2003–2004	Mouscron	30	(28)
2004–2007	Auxerre	80	(21)
2007–2008	Nantes	14	(1)
2007–2008	→ Lens (loan)	11	(2)
2008	→ Anderlecht (loan)	12	(3)
2008–2010	Valenciennes	12	(2)
2010	Gent	8	(2)
2010–2011	Standard Liège	19	(2)
2011–2013	Arles-Avignon	22	(3)
Total		304	(92)

International career
2004–2008	Belgium	24	(2)

Managerial career
- 2016–2019: Standard Liège B (assistant)
- 2019–2021: RFC Seraing (assistant)
- 2021: KAA Gent (U16)
- 2021–: Raja CA (assistant)
- * Club domestic league appearances and goals

Luigi Pieroni (born 8 September 1980) is a Belgian football manager and former player who is assistant manager of Raja CA. A forward, he played in Belgium and France. At international level, he represented the Belgium national team.

== Playing career ==
Pieroni was born in Liège, Belgium. He finished the 2003–04 Belgian First Division season as topscorer with 28 goals while he was playing for R.E. Mouscron. He previously played with R.F.C. Liégeois, Auxerre and was loaned out to Lens and Anderlecht while he was under contract with the FC Nantes. In 2008, he signed with Valenciennes and in 2010 he returned to Belgium, where he signed with K.A.A. Gent. After a two-year stint with Standard Liège, he signed a contract with French Ligue 2 club AC Arles-Avignon on 19 July 2011. His playing career came to a halt in the end of the 2012–13 season when he retired at the age of 32 due to a long time Phlebitis.

== Coaching career ==
In March 2016 it was announced, that Pieroni had returned to Standard Liège and should be working as a forward coach for the club's academy, scout for the first team and also as assistant manager for the reserve team.

Pieroni left Standard in the summer 2019, to become the assistant manager of his former teammate, Christophe Grégoire, at Royal Football Club Seraing.

After promotion to the Jupiler Pro League in 2021, Luigi Pieroni left Seraing to train the U16 youth of KAA Gent, following head coach Emilio Ferrera who became head of youth at Gent.

On 16 November 2021, it was reported that Pieroni had quit the U16 of Gent to become the assistant of Marc Wilmots at Raja CA.

== Personal life ==
He has a son, Gianluca born on 4 January 2007.

== International goals ==
Scores and results list Belgium's goal tally first, score column indicates score after each Pieroni goal.

List of international goals scored by Luigi Pieroni
No.	Date	Venue	Opponent	Score	Result	Competition
1	1 March 2006	Stade Josy Barthel, Luxembourg City, Luxembourg	Luxembourg	2–0	2–0	Friendly
2	21 November 2007	Tofig Bahramov Stadium, Baku, Azerbaijan	Azerbaijan	1–0	1–0	Euro 2008 Qualification
