= Landry Mulemo =

Congolese footballer

Personal information
- Full name: Landry Mulemo
- Date of birth: 17 September 1986 (age 40)
- Place of birth: Liège, Belgium
- Height: 1.78 m (5 ft 10 in)
- Position: Left back

Youth career
- 1990–1992: Standard Liège
- 1992–1995: FC Flémalle
- 1995–2004: Standard Liège

Senior career*
Years	Team	Apps	(Gls)
2004–2010	Standard Liège	51	(0)
2004–2007	→ St. Truiden (loan)	65	(1)
2010–2011	Bucaspor	21	(0)
2011–2013	Kortrijk	36	(1)
2013–2014	Beitar Jerusalem	17	(0)
2014–2015	Kaposvár	11	(0)
2015	KV Kortrijk	26	(0)
2017	Vllaznia Shkodër	1	(0)
2017	Birkirkara	5	(0)
2020	UR Namur		

International career^{‡}
2003	Belgium U17	6	(1)
2003–2004	Belgium U18	11	(0)
2006–2008	Belgium U21	10	(0)
2008	Belgium U23	5	(0)
2011–	DR Congo	10	(0)
- * Club domestic league appearances and goals ‡ National team caps and goals as of 5 March 2017 (UTC)

Landry Mulemo (born 17 September 1986 in Liège, Belgium) is a Congolese professional footballer.

== Career ==
Mulemo began his career with Standard Liège as a youth team player where he played for two years before signing with FC Flémalle in 1992. After three years with FC Flémalle he returned, in the summer 1995, to Standard Liège.

After nine years at Standard Liège, in July 2004, he moved to Sint-Truidense on loan. He played sixty five games, scoring one goal and in July 2007 again returned to play for Standard Liège. On 22 June 2010 Bucaspor signed the Democratic Republic of the Congo left-back from Standard Liège on a one-year contract.

In January 2016, Swiss third division side Servette FC announced that Landry Mulemo was spending three days on trial with them

On 27 January 2020, Mulemo returned to the pitch after two years without club, signing with Belgian club UR Namur, where he also was named captain. The club announced his departure in August 2020.

== International career ==
Mulemo has played in the Belgium U-21 team and was in the team which played in the 2007 UEFA European Under-21 Football Championship in the Netherlands. He has also represented the Belgium U-23 team at 2008 Summer Olympics in Beijing.

Mulemo plays since 2011 for DR Congo at senior level and played a FIFA World Cup qualifier match against Swaziland on 11 November 2011.

== Honours ==
Standard Liège

- Belgian First Division: 2007–08, 2008–09
- Belgian Supercup: 2008, 2009
