= Juan Aguilar (footballer) =

Paraguayan footballer (born 1989)

Personal information
- Full name: Juan José Aguilar Orzusa
- Date of birth: 24 June 1989 (age 37)
- Place of birth: Paraguay
- Height: 1.71 m (5 ft 7 1/2 in)
- Position: Defensive midfielder

Team information
- Current team: Sol de América
- Number: 24

Youth career
- Guaraní

Senior career*
Years	Team	Apps	(Gls)
2009–2017	Guaraní	175	(0)
2009	→ Bellinzona (loan)		
2009–2010	→ Eupen (loan)	30	(15)
2017–2020	Cerro Porteño	71	(0)
2020–	Sol de América	10	(0)
- * Club domestic league appearances and goals as of 14:31, 28 September 2020 (UTC)

Juan Aguilar (born 24 June 1989) is a Paraguayan footballer. He currently plays for Club Sol de América.

== Career ==
Aguilar had played for Club Guaraní at 2009 Copa Libertadores. He played 3 out of 6 group stage matches.

In summer 2009, he was signed for Eupen on loan.
