= Bart Van Zundert =

Belgian footballer

Personal information
- Date of birth: 30 November 1980 (age 45)
- Place of birth: Merksem, Belgium
- Height: 1.84 m (6 ft 0 in)
- Position: Defender

Youth career
- 1994–1997: Zandvliet Sport
- 1997–1998: Germinal Ekeren

Senior career*
| Years | Team | Apps | (Gls) |
| 1998–2005 | Germinal Beerschot | 56 | (0) |
| 2002–2003 | → Geel (loan) | | |
| 2005–2007 | Mechelen | | |
| 2007–2010 | Zulte Waregem | 33 | (2) |
| 2010 | → Dender (loan) | 13 | (2) |
| 2010–2011 | Royal Antwerp | 30 | (1) |
| 2011–2014 | FC Cappellen | | |
- * Club domestic league appearances and goals

Bart Van Zundert (born 30 November 1980) is a Belgian former professional footballer who played as a defender.
