= Davino Verhulst =

Belgian footballer

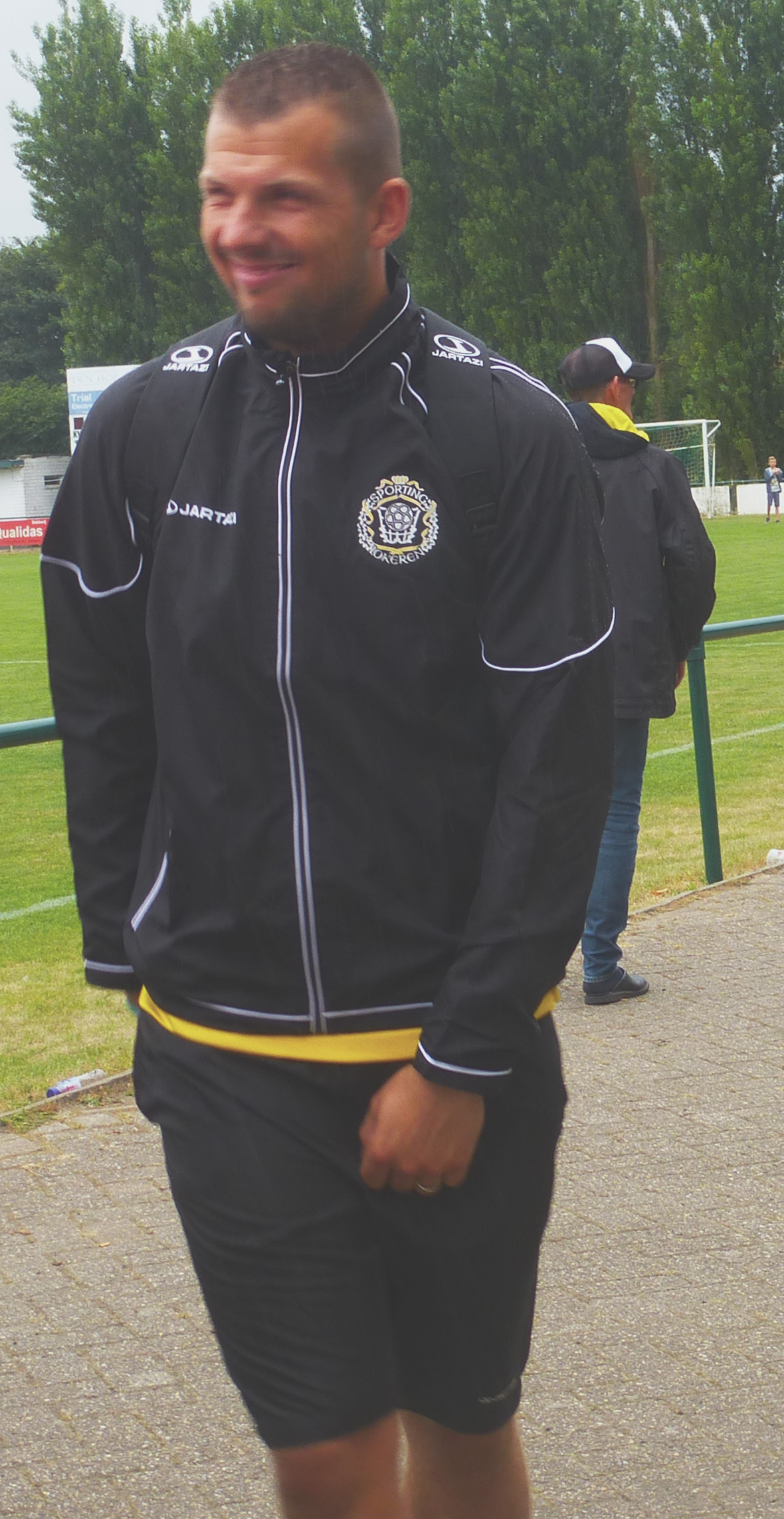

Personal information
- Date of birth: 25 November 1987 (age 38)
- Place of birth: Beveren, Belgium
- Height: 1.93 m (6 ft 4 in)
- Position: Goalkeeper

Team information
- Current team: FC Ekeren

Senior career*
Years	Team	Apps	(Gls)
2003–2007	Beveren	9	(0)
2007–2011	Genk	23	(0)
2010–2011	→ Willem II (loan)	14	(0)
2011–2013	Sint-Truiden	17	(0)
2013–2020	Lokeren	139	(0)
2020–2022	Apollon Smyrnis	43	(0)
2022–2024	Antwerp	0	(0)
2024–2025	Belisia Bilzen	17	(0)
2025–	FC Ekeren		

International career
2005	Belgium U18	4	(0)
2005–2006	Belgium U19	6	(0)
- * Club domestic league appearances and goals as of 1 February 2026

Davino Verhulst (born 25 November 1987) is a Belgian professional footballer who plays as a goalkeeper for FC Ekeren.

== Career ==
At the age of fifteen, he joined the first team of KSK Beveren. Clubs like Manchester City, the Bolton Wanderers, and Udinese Calcio were interested in him but he choose to stay at the Freethiel. However, he has never been able to be a first choice keeper because of the presence of Boubacar Barry. He made his first team debut against Benfica in the UEFA Cup of 2004 after the red card of Copa but he could not avoid the 3–0 defeat and the following elimination.

In the 2005–06 season he played eight matches during an injury of Copa. He made some nice saves against teams like Club Brugge but was again relegated to second choice after Copa's recovery. In the 2006–07 season he came in a twist with Copa, and in the winter transfer period, he was bought by leader KRC Genk as second choice behind Logan Bailly.

Verhulst was a regular member of the Belgium U18 national team.

== Honours ==
Genk

- Belgian Cup: 2008–09

Lokeren

- Belgian Cup: 2013–14

Antwerp

- Belgian Cup: 2022-23
