= Grégory Grisez =

Belgian footballer

Personal information
- Date of birth: 17 August 1989 (age 37)
- Place of birth: La Louvière, Belgium
- Height: 1.85 m (6 ft 1 in)
- Positions: Left-back; left winger

Team information
- Current team: Braine
- Number: 17

Youth career
- –2009: Charleroi

Senior career*
Years	Team	Apps	(Gls)
2009–2011	Francs Borains	48	(6)
2011–2012	Visé	26	(0)
2012–2014	La Louvière Centre	56	(5)
2014–2016	RWS Bruxelles	51	(9)
2016–2018	Roeselare	49	(1)
2018–2021	Beerschot	41	(0)
2021–2022	Fola Esch	21	(7)
2022–2024	Francs Borains	20	(0)
2024–2025	RUS Binche	24	(1)
2025–	Braine	0	(0)
- * Club domestic league appearances and goals as of 16 January 2026

Grégory Grisez (born 17 August 1989) is a Belgian professional footballer who plays as a left back for Braine.
