= Orlando (footballer, born 1981) =

Brazilian footballer

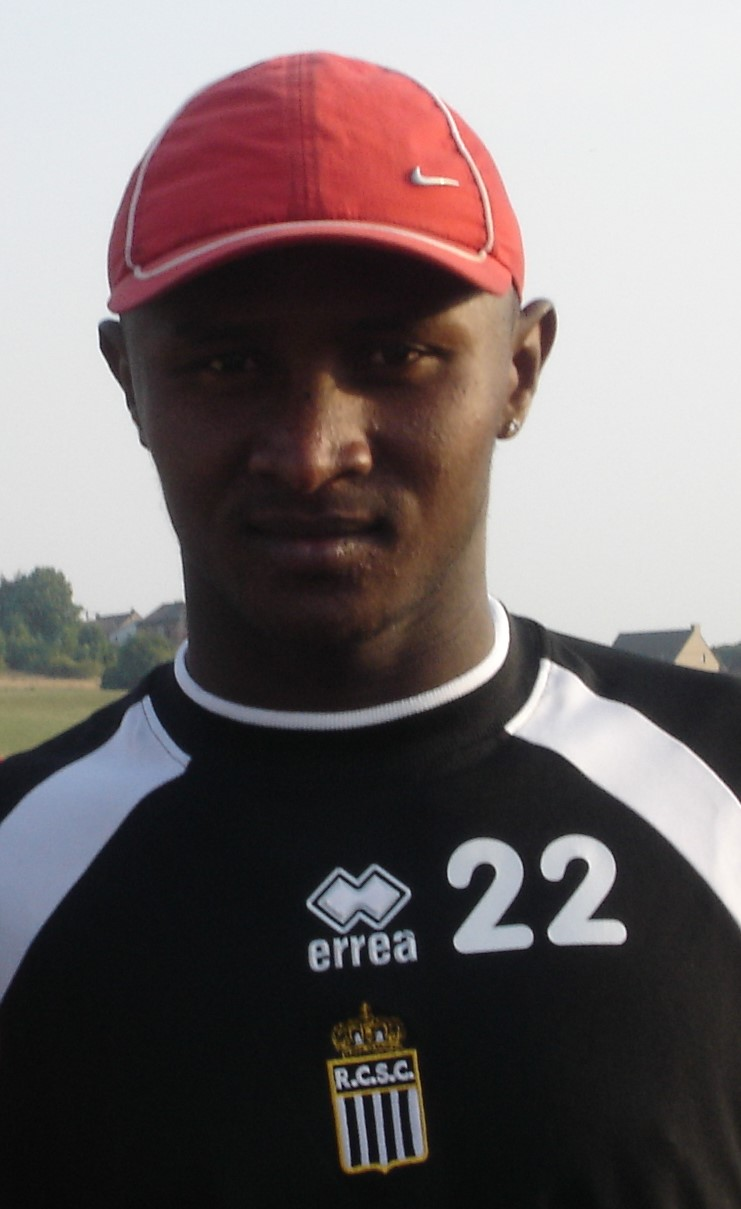
- Orlando in 2005

Personal information
- Full name: Orlando dos Santos Costa
- Date of birth: 26 February 1981 (age 45)
- Place of birth: São Luís, Brazil
- Height: 1.87 m (6 ft 2 in)
- Position: Striker

Senior career*
Years	Team	Apps	(Gls)
2004	Caxias		
2004–2011	Sporting Charleroi	151	(16)
2010	→ Genk (loan)	3	(1)
2011	→ Panthrakikos (loan)	13	(1)
2011–2012	Sampaio Corrêa	7	(2)
- * Club domestic league appearances and goals

Orlando dos Santos Costa (born 26 February 1981) is a Brazilian former professional footballer who played as a striker.

== Career ==
Orlando spent the majority of his career playing for the Belgian Pro League club Sporting Charleroi, making 151 appearances with 16 goals in seven seasons.

On 31 January 2010, Orlando moved to Genk on loan for the remainder of the 2010–11 season. In January 2011, he was sent on loan to Greek club Panthrakikos.
