= Michaël Cordier =

Belgian footballer

Personal information
- Date of birth: 27 March 1984 (age 42)
- Place of birth: Belgium
- Height: 1.84 m (6 ft 1/2 in)
- Position: Goalkeeper

Team information
- Current team: RFC Rapid Symphorinois

Youth career
- 1990–1999: Anderlues
- 1999–2001: Charleroi

Senior career*
Years	Team	Apps	(Gls)
2001–2004	Charleroi	0	(0)
2001–2002	→ Eendracht Aalst (loan)	4	(0)
2004–2006	La Louvière	33	(0)
2006–2008	FC Brussels	28	(0)
2008–2012	Anderlecht	2	(0)
2010	→ Olympic Charleroi (loan)	10	(0)
2012–2015	Westerlo	27	(0)
2015–2016	Club Brugge	0	(0)
2016–2018	URS Centre		
2018–	RFC Rapid Symphorinois		

International career
2006	Belgium U21	4	(0)
- * Club domestic league appearances and goals as of 21 September 2017

Michaël Cordier (born 27 March 1984) is a Belgian professional footballer who plays for RFC Rapid Symphorinois as a goalkeeper.

== Career ==
He formerly played for Charleroi, Eendracht Aalst, La Louvière, FC Brussels and Anderlecht. He participated at the 2007 UEFA European Under-21 Championship.
