= 2012–13 Belgian Second Division =

Belgian Second Division
- Season: 2012–13
- Champions: Oostende
- Promoted: Oostende
- Relegated: Oudenaarde; Sint-Niklaas
- Matches: 306
- Goals: 803 (2.62 per match)
- Top goalscorer: Hervé Onana (17 goals)
- Biggest home win: Dessel Sport 5–0 Antwerp; Sint-Truiden 5–0 Sint-Niklaas
- Biggest away win: Sint-Niklaas 0–5 Tubize
- Highest scoring: Tubize 4–4 Eendracht Aalst; Westerlo 4–4 Sint-Niklaas

The 2012–13 season of the Belgian Second Division (also known as Belgacom League for sponsorship reasons) began on 22 August 2012 and ended in April 2013. The season was won by Oostende, who were thus promoted to the Belgian Pro League. Mouscron-Péruwelz, Westerlo and WS Woluwe played the second division final round but lost this to Cercle Brugge, resulting in no other team gaining promotion. At the bottom end of the table, Sint-Niklaas and Oudenaarde were relegated, while Heist were saved due to the bankruptcy of Beerschot AC.

== Team changes ==
After promotion and relegation, only 13 teams of the previous season remained in the league, with 5 others being replaced:

=== Out ===
- Charleroi were promoted as champions of the previous season.
- Waasland-Beveren ended second, but won the second division final round and was therefore also promoted to the Pro League.
- Tienen ended 16th, but lost the third division playoffs and was subsequently relegated.
- Dender EH was relegated to the Third Division after finishing 17th.
- Wetteren was relegated to the Third Division after finishing 18th.

=== In ===
- Sint-Truiden was directly relegated from the Pro League.
- Westerlo lost the second division final round and as a result they were also relegated from the Pro League.
- Mouscron-Péruwelz promoted as champions from Third Division A.
- Dessel Sport promoted as champions from Third Division B.
- Oudenaarde was promoted after winning the third division playoffs.

== Team information ==
Club	City	Current manager	First season of current spell in second division	Coming from	2011–12 result	Stadium	Capacity
SC Eendracht Aalst	Aalst	(Belgium) Bart Van Renterghem	2011–12	Belgian Third Division	7th (D2)	Pierre Cornelisstadion	7,500
Royal Antwerp F.C.	Antwerp	(Netherlands) Dennis van Wijk	2004–05	Belgian Pro League	10th (D2)	Bosuilstadion	16,649
Boussu Dour Borinage	Boussu	(France) Arnauld Mercier	2009–10	Belgian Third Division	11th (D2)	Stade Robert Urbain	2,000
FC Brussels	Sint-Jans-Molenbeek	(Algeria) Noureddine Zaiour	2008–09	Belgian Pro League	14th (D2)	Edmond Machtens Stadium	11,000
K.F.C. Dessel Sport	Dessel	(Belgium) Stijn Vreven	2012–13	Belgian Third Division	1st (D3B)	Lorzestraat	5,000
K.A.S. Eupen	Eupen	(Spain) Tintín Márquez	2011–12	Belgian Pro League	3rd (D2)	Kehrweg Stadion	8,000
K.S.K. Heist	Heist-op-den-Berg	(Belgium) Francis Bosschaerts	2010–11	Belgian Third Division	8th (D2)	Gemeentelijk Sportcentrum	3,000
Lommel United	Lommel	(Belgium) Philip Haagdoren	2005–06	Belgian Third Division	5th (D2)	Soevereinstadion	12,500
Royal Mouscron-Péruwelz	Mouscron	(France) Arnaud Dos Santos	2012–13	Belgian Third Division	1st (D3A)	Stade Le Canonnier	10,800
K.V. Oostende	Ostend	(Belgium) Frederik Vanderbiest	2005–06	Belgian Pro League	4th (D2)	Albertpark	8,000
K.S.V. Oudenaarde	Oudenaarde	(Belgium) Stefan Leleu	2012–13	Belgian Third Division	3rd (D3A)	Burgemeester Thienpontstadion	5,000
K.S.V. Roeselare	Roeselare	(Ukraine) Serhiy Serebrennikov	2010–11	Belgian Pro League	13th (D2)	Schiervelde Stadion	9,075
F.C.N. Sint-Niklaas	Sint-Niklaas	(Belgium) Alex Czerniatynski	2011–12	Belgian Third Division	15th (D2)	Stedelijk Sportcentrum Meesterstraat	3,000
K. Sint-Truidense V.V.	Sint-Truiden	(Belgium) Guido Brepoels	2012–13	Belgian Pro League	16th (D1)	Stayen	11,250
A.F.C. Tubize	Tubize	(Belgium) Dante Brogno	2009–10	Belgian Pro League	12th (D2)	Stade Leburton	9,000
C.S. Visé	Wezet	(Italy) Manuele Domenicali	2010–11	Belgian Third Division	9th (D2)	Stade de la Cité de l'Oie	6,000
K.V.C. Westerlo	Westerlo	(Belgium) Frank Dauwen	2012–13	Belgian Pro League	15th (D1)	Het Kuipje	7,982
White Star Woluwe F.C.	Woluwe-Saint-Lambert	(Belgium) Felice Mazzu	2011–12	Belgian Third Division	6th (D2)	Stade Fallon	2,500

Locations of the 2012–13 Belgian Second Division teams

== Regular season ==
=== League table ===
Pos	Team	Pld	W	D	L	GF	GA	GD	Pts	Promotion or relegation
1	Oostende (C, P)	34	24	5	5	64	25	+39	77	Belgian First Division
2	Mouscron-Péruwelz (Q)	34	20	7	7	58	29	+29	67	Qualification for Promotion play-off
3	Westerlo (Q)	34	17	12	5	54	29	+25	63	Qualification for Promotion play-off
4	Sint-Truiden	34	17	6	11	54	36	+18	57	
5	Borinage	34	15	10	9	44	34	+10	55	
6	Lommel	34	14	8	12	50	48	+2	50	
7	Woluwe (Q)	34	14	7	13	41	49	−8	49	Qualification for Promotion play-off
8	Eupen	34	13	10	11	44	37	+7	49	
9	Tubize	34	12	10	12	43	42	+1	46	
10	Antwerp	34	12	9	13	42	44	−2	45	
11	Roeselare	34	10	12	12	44	47	−3	42	
12	Dessel	34	11	8	15	35	42	−7	41	
13	Aalst	34	10	11	13	38	52	−14	41	
14	Brussels	34	9	6	19	34	49	−15	33	
15	Visé	34	8	9	17	47	57	−10	33	
16	Heist	34	8	6	20	39	57	−18	30 (Note: Beerschot, who were relegated from the Belgian Pro League, went bankrupt just after the season. As a result the 16th placed team (Heist) was able to remain in the Second Division, while Oudenaarde had to play the relegation round instead of directly relegating.)	
17	Oudenaarde (Q)	34	8	9	17	36	60	−24	30 (Note: During Oudenaarde-Woluwe, Woluwe substituted one of their players for an unregistered player and initially lost the game with a 5-0 score due to forfeit. The Belgian FA later decided that Oudenaarde would not gain 3 points and the result would be cancelled. Oudenaarde then refused to play the relegation round and forfeited their playoff matches, causing them to be relegated.)	Qualification for Relegation play-off
18	Sint-Niklaas (R)	34	7	9	18	34	64	−30	30	Relegation to 2013–14 Belgian Third Division

Source: Belgian Second Division
Rules for classification: 1) points; 2) number of matches won; if teams are still tied a playoff is organised.
(C) Champions; (P) Promoted; (Q) Qualified for the phase indicated; (R) Relegated

=== Period winners ===
Like before, the season was divided into three periods. The first ten matchdays together form the first period, matchdays 11 to 22 form period two and the last 12 form period three. The three period winners take part in the Belgian Second Division final round together with the winner of the 2012–13 Belgian Pro League relegation playoff. The winner of this final round gets to play in the 2013–14 Belgian Pro League.

The first period was won by WS Woluwe and the second and third by Oostende. As Oostende won the title, Mouscron-Péruwelz and Westerlo were given the right to take part in the Final Round as the two highest finishing teams not yet entitled.

==== Period 1 ====
Pos	Team	Pld	W	D	L	GF	GA	GD	Pts	Qualification
1	Woluwe (Q)	10	6	4	0	17	6	+11	22	Belgian Second Division final round
2	Westerlo	10	6	3	1	14	7	+7	21	
3	Borinage	10	5	2	3	14	10	+4	17	
4	Antwerp	10	4	5	1	14	13	+1	17	
5	Tubize	10	4	4	2	17	11	+6	16	

Rules for classification: 1) points; 2) number of matches won; if teams are still tied a playoff is organised.
(Q) Qualified for the phase indicated

==== Period 2 ====
Pos	Team	Pld	W	D	L	GF	GA	GD	Pts	Qualification
1	Oostende (Q)	12	10	1	1	22	7	+15	31	Belgian Second Division final round
2	Mouscron-Péruwelz	12	9	1	2	23	9	+14	28	
3	Sint-Truiden	12	8	1	3	24	10	+14	25	
4	Eupen	12	7	2	3	17	13	+4	23	
5	Lommel	12	6	1	5	19	17	+2	19	

Rules for classification: 1) points; 2) number of matches won; if teams are still tied a playoff is organised.
(Q) Qualified for the phase indicated

==== Period 3 ====
Pos	Team	Pld	W	D	L	GF	GA	GD	Pts	Qualification
1	Oostende (Q)	12	10	1	1	29	8	+21	31	Belgian Second Division final round
2	Mouscron-Péruwelz	12	8	1	3	22	10	+12	25	
3	Westerlo	12	7	4	1	22	8	+14	25	
4	Lommel	12	6	2	4	21	17	+4	20	
5	Borinage	12	5	5	2	14	12	+2	20	

Rules for classification: 1) points; 2) number of matches won; if teams are still tied a playoff is organised.
(Q) Qualified for the phase indicated

== Season statistics ==
=== Top scorers ===
Source: Belgcom League

Rank	Player	Club	Goals
1	(Cameroon) Hervé Onana	Tubize	17
2	(Belgium) Bart Webers	Heist	15
3	(Belgium) Laurent Depoitre	Oostende	14
3	(Brazil) Daniel Oliveira	WS Woluwe	14
3	(Costa Rica) John Jairo Ruiz	Mouscron-Péruwelz	14
6	(Ivory Coast) Koffi	Boussu Dour	13
6	(Belgium) Hans Vanaken	Lommel	13
8	(France) Kamel Ouejdide	Borinage	12
9	(Belgium) Yohan Brouckaert	Oostende	11
9	(Greece) Stavros Glouftsis	Aalst	11
9	(Belgium) Bart Goor	Westerlo	11
9	(Benin) Frédéric Gounongbe	Brussels	11
9	(Japan) Hiroshi Ibusuki	Eupen	11

10 goals (4 players)

- (Belgium) Ratko Vansimpsen (Dessel Sport)
- (Venezuela) Christian Santos (Eupen)
- (Belgium) Joeri Dequevy (Sint-Truiden)
- (France) Raphaël Lecomte (Visé)

9 goals (3 players)

- (France) Baptiste Schmisser (Oostende)
- (Greece) Ioannis Masmanidis (Visé)
- (Ghana) William Owusu (Westerlo)

8 goals (3 players)

- (Belgium) Dieter Van Tornhout (Antwerp)
- (Belgium) Alessandro Cerigioni (Lommel)
- (France) Seïd Khiter (Mouscron-Péruwelz)

7 goals (6 players)

- (Belgium) Leandro Trossard (Lommel)
- (France) Jérôme Mezine (Mouscron-Péruwelz)
- (Belgium) Benjamin Lutun (Roeselare)
- (Democratic Republic of the Congo) Marcel Mbayo (Sint-Niklaas)
- (Belgium) Nils Schouterden (Sint-Truiden)
- (Belgium) Kevin Vandenbergh (Westerlo)

6 goals (11 players)

- (Belgium) Michael Lallemand (Eupen)
- (Belgium) Bram Criel (Heist)
- (Belgium) Jeroen Vanderputte (Heist)
- (France) Anthony Bova (Mouscron-Péruwelz)
- (France) Benjamin Delacourt (Mouscron-Péruwelz)
- (Belgium) Dempsey Vervaecke (Oudenaarde)
- (Belgium) Sven De Rechter (Roeselare)
- (Iran) Reza Ghoochannejhad (Sint-Truiden)
- (Netherlands) Donny de Groot (Sint-Truiden)
- (France) Philippe Liard (Tubize)
- (France) Chris Makiese (Visé)

5 goals (17 players)

- (Belgium) Jonas Bogaerts (Aalst)
- (Belgium) Omar Benassar (Antwerp)
- (France) Jordan Faucher (Antwerp)
- (France) Maxime Lemoine (Borinage)
- (Belgium) Redouan Aalhoul (Brussels)
- (Ghana) Prince Asubonteng (Dessel Sport)
- (Turkey) Huseyin Bilican (Dessel Sport)
- (Belgium) Dieter Dekelver (Lommel)
- (Mali) Mahamadou Dissa (Oostende)
- (France) Xavier Luissint (Oostende)
- (Belgium) Wouter Moreels (Oostende)
- (France) Alexandre Frutos (Oudenaarde)
- (Democratic Republic of the Congo) Junior Kabananga (Roeselare)
- (Belgium) Kurt Weuts (Sint-Niklaas)
- (Haiti) Gary Ambroise (Tubize)
- (Ukraine) Oleg Iachtchouk (Westerlo)
- (Belgium) Julien Guérenne (WS Woluwe)

4 goals (22 players)

- (Belgium) Alexandre Di Gregorio (Aalst)
- (Belgium) Niels Martin (Aalst)
- (Belgium) Oumar Diouck (Antwerp)
- (Niger) Olivier Bonnes (Brussels)
- (Cameroon) Sébastien Siani (Brussels)
- (Nigeria) Anthony Bassey (Eupen)
- (Belgium) Christian Kabasele (Eupen)
- (Belgium) Siegerd Degeling (Heist)
- (Belgium) Wouter Scheelen (Lommel)
- (France) Marvin Turcan (Mouscron-Péruwelz)
- (Belgium) Jesse Martens (Oudenaarde)
- (Belgium) Sébastien Dewaest (Roeselare)
- (Belgium) Anthony Di Lallo (Roeselare)
- (Belgium) Bram Vandenbussche (Roeselare)
- (Belgium) Jonas Vandermarliere (Sint-Niklaas)
- (Brazil) Bruno Andrade (Sint-Truiden)
- (Belgium) Grégory Dufer (Sint-Truiden)
- (Brazil) Andrei (Tubize)
- (Belgium) Arnaud Biatour (Visé)
- (Belgium) Nick Van Belle (Westerlo)
- (Morocco) Chemcedine El Araichi (WS Woluwe)
- (Sweden) Patrick Amoah (WS Woluwe)

3 goals (25 players)

- (Belgium) Marijn Vandewalle (Aalst)
- (Belgium) Seppe Kil (Antwerp)
- (Burundi) Christophe Nahimana (Brussels)
- (Belgium) Zico Gielis (Dessel Sport)
- (Belgium) Hans Hannes (Dessel Sport)
- (Bosnia and Herzegovina) Dino Peljto (Dessel Sport)
- (Belgium) Thomas Stevens (Heist)
- (Belgium) Roy Meeus (Lommel)
- (Belgium) Michiel Jonckheere (Oostende)
- (Belgium) Jamaïque Vandamme (Oostende)
- (Belgium) Jan De Langhe (Oudenaarde)
- (Belgium) Tom Raes (Oudenaarde)
- (Belgium) Frederik Declercq (Roeselare)
- (Belgium) Romain Haghedooren (Roeselare)
- (Belgium) Daniel Ternest (Roeselare)
- (Rwanda) Henri Munyaneza (Sint-Niklaas)
- (Belgium) Guy Dufour (Sint-Truiden)
- (France) Emmanuel Françoise (Visé)
- (Belgium) Jens Cools (Westerlo)
- (Belgium) Kevin Geudens (Westerlo)
- (Belgium) Philippe Janssens (Westerlo)
- (Democratic Republic of the Congo) Trésor Diowo (WS Woluwe)
- (Belgium) Jonathan Heris (WS Woluwe)
- (Belgium) Yannick Loemba (WS Woluwe)
- (Belgium) Ivan Yagan (WS Woluwe)

2 goals (46 players)

- (Belgium) Tjendo De Cuyper (Aalst)
- (Belgium) Sander Van Eyk (Aalst)
- (Montenegro) Predrag Filipović (Aalst)
- (Portugal) Bruno Carvalho (Antwerp)
- (Democratic Republic of the Congo) Freddy Mombongo-Dues (Antwerp)
- (Belgium) Joren Dom (Antwerp)
- (England) Luke Giverin (Antwerp)
- (Belgium) Nicky Hayen (Antwerp)
- (France) Rachid El Barkaoui (Borinage)
- (Belgium) Hicham El Morabit (Borinage)
- (France) Alexandre Laurienté (Borinage)
- (France) Samuel Robail (Borinage)
- (Nigeria) Kingsley Umunegbu (Borinage)
- (Senegal) Mansour Diop (Brussels)
- (Belgium) Wouter Vosters (Dessel Sport)
- (Ghana) Samuel Asamoah (Eupen)
- (Belgium) Romeo Debefve (Eupen)
- (Belgium) Glenn Neven (Heist)
- (Belgium) Bart Goossens (Lommel)
- (Belgium) Thomas Jutten (Lommel)
- (Poland) Egon Wisniowski (Lommel)
- (France) Jugurtha Domrane (Mouscron-Péruwelz)
- (Belgium) Viktor Klonaridis (Mouscron-Péruwelz)
- (France) Mickaël Seoudi (Mouscron-Péruwelz)
- (Belgium) Kevin Vandendriessche (Mouscron-Péruwelz)
- (Belgium) Niels De Schutter (Oostende)
- (Belgium) Mathias Schamp (Oudenaarde)
- (Belgium) Klaas Van Den Bossche (Oudenaarde)
- (Belgium) François Kompany (Sint-Niklaas)
- (Algeria) Abdelhakim Laref (Sint-Niklaas)
- (Belgium) Tail Schoonjans (Sint-Niklaas)
- (Belgium) Lode Vertonghen (Sint-Niklaas)
- (Brazil) Edmilson (Sint-Truiden)
- (Germany) Sascha Kotysch (Sint-Truiden)
- (Croatia) Leopold Novak (Sint-Truiden)
- (Belgium) Lou Wallaert (Tubize)
- (Ghana) Gideon Boateng (Visé)
- (Belgium) Pierre-Alain Laloux (Visé)
- (Belgium) Daan De Pever (Visé)
- (Italy) Matteo Prandelli (Visé)
- (Belgium) Redouane Zerzouri (Visé)
- (Belgium) Laurens Paulussen (Westerlo)
- (Belgium) Jonathan Wilmet (Westerlo)
- (Belgium) Denis Dessaer (WS Woluwe)
- (Belgium) Frédéric Farin (WS Woluwe)
- (Belgium) Jérémy Serwy (WS Woluwe)

1 goal (75 players)

- (Belgium) Sam De Munter (Aalst)
- (Belgium) Maxime Gunst (Aalst)
- (Belgium) Tom Pietermaat (Aalst)
- (Belgium) Ken Van Damme (Aalst)
- (Belgium) Conor Laerenbergh (Antwerp)
- (Belgium) David Vandenbroeck (Antwerp)
- (Zimbabwe) Honour Gombami (Antwerp)
- (Rwanda) Salomon Nirisarike (Antwerp)
- (Netherlands) Gyliano van Velzen (Antwerp)
- (France) Rachid Mourabit (Borinage)
- (Belgium) Geoffrey Cabeke (Brussels)
- (France) Aliou Dia (Brussels)
- (Burundi) David Habarugira (Brussels)
- (France) Kevin Tunani (Brussels)
- (Italy) Francesco Carratta (Dessel Sport)
- (Bulgaria) Aleksandar Kolev (Dessel Sport)
- (Belgium) Jonas Nijs (Dessel Sport)
- (Belgium) Kurt Remen (Dessel Sport)
- (Mali) Alassane Diallo (Eupen)
- (Cameroon) Prisse Kenne (Eupen)
- (Belgium) Kevin Kis (Eupen)
- (Belgium) Luigi Vaccaro (Eupen)
- (Belgium) Jimmy Fockaert (Heist)
- (Belgium) Simon Vermeiren (Heist)
- (Belgium) Jentl Gaethofs (Lommel)
- (Belgium) Toon Lenaerts (Lommel)
- (Netherlands) Ken van Mierlo (Lommel)
- (France) Sébastien Alliotte (Mouscron-Péruwelz)
- (France) Anice Badri (Mouscron-Péruwelz)
- (Belgium) Jérémy Huyghebaert (Mouscron-Péruwelz)
- (France) Dimitri Mohamed (Mouscron-Péruwelz)
- (Belgium) Vincent Provoost (Mouscron-Péruwelz)
- (Belgium) Niels Coussement (Oostende)
- (France) Guillaume Dequaire (Oostende)
- (Belgium) Gertjan Martens (Oostende)
- (Belgium) Ramzi Ben Ahmed (Oudenaarde)
- (Belgium) Viktor De Coker (Oudenaarde)
- (Belgium) Mathieu De Jonckheere (Oudenaarde)
- (Belgium) Dieter De Wilde (Oudenaarde)
- (Belgium) Ludwin Van Nieuwenhuyze (Oudenaarde)
- (Belgium) Arne Naudts (Oudenaarde)
- (Morocco) Abdelhakim Bouhna (Roeselare)
- (Belgium) Yannick Euvrard (Roeselare)
- (Senegal) Papa Sène (Roeselare)
- (Armenia) Masis Voskanyan (Roeselare)
- (Ghana) Prince Bobby (Sint-Niklaas)
- (Belgium) Steve Dessart (Sint-Niklaas)
- (Nigeria) Tosin Dosunmu (Sint-Niklaas)
- (Belgium) Gertjan Martens (Sint-Niklaas)
- (Belgium) Enzo Neve (Sint-Niklaas)
- (Belgium) Steven Schurmann (Sint-Niklaas)
- (Guinea) Souleymane Youla (Sint-Niklaas)
- (Uruguay) Guillermo Méndez (Sint-Truiden)
- (Belgium) Mario Pruna (Sint-Truiden)
- (Netherlands) Ivo Rossen (Sint-Truiden)
- (Belgium) Mathias Schils (Sint-Truiden)
- (Belgium) Pierre-Yves Ngawa (Sint-Truiden)
- (Israel) Yadin Zaris (Sint-Truiden)
- (Mali) Samba Diawara (Tubize)
- (Belgium) Noë Dussenne (Tubize)
- (Belgium) Shean Garlito (Tubize)
- (Belgium) Laurent Kwembeke (Tubize)
- (Belgium) Sami Lkoutbi (Tubize)
- (Rwanda) Jimmy Mulisa (Tubize)
- (Belgium) Jeremy Steens (Tubize)
- (Guinea) Norman Sylla (Tubize)
- (Belgium) Manuel Angiulli (Visé)
- (Mali) Kader Camara (Visé)
- (Belgium) Jeffrey Rentmeister (Visé)
- (France) Harlem Gnohéré (Westerlo)
- (Belgium) Stijn Minne (Westerlo)
- (Belgium) Kenneth Schuermans (Westerlo)
- (Belgium) Jeroen Vanthournout (Westerlo)
- (Guinea) Lanfia Camara (WS Woluwe)
- (France) Sylvain Macé (WS Woluwe)

2 Own goals (1 player)

- (Belgium) Tom Raes (Oudenaarde, scored for Heist and Roeselare)

1 Own goal (11 players)

- (Belgium) Jonas Nijs (Dessel Sport, scored for Visé)
- (Belgium) Christophe Delande (Lommel, scored for Westerlo)
- (Belgium) Hans Vanaken (Lommel, scored for Heist)
- (Belgium) Dieter De Wilde (Oudenaarde, scored for Eupen)
- (Senegal) Elhadji Ndoye (Sint-Truiden, scored for Brussels)
- (Belgium) Pierre-Yves Ngawa (Sint-Truiden, scored for Tubize)
- (Mali) Samba Diawara (Tubize, scored for Visé)
- (Guinea) Kader Camara (Visé, scored for Sint-Truiden)
- (Italy) Aka Kevin Etien (Visé, scored for Heist)
- (Italy) Marco Villagatti (Visé, scored for Antwerp)
- (Belgium) Kenneth Schuermans (Westerlo, scored for Sint-Niklaas)
