= 2013–14 Belgian Second Division =

Belgian Second Division
- Season: 2013–14
- Champions: Westerlo
- Promoted: Westerlo; Royal Mouscron-Péruwelz
- Relegated: Brussels; Visé; Hoogstraten
- Matches: 306
- Goals: 835 (2.73 per match)
- Top goalscorer: Koffi; Michael Lallemand (11 goals each)
- Biggest home win: Westerlo 6–0 Roeselare (15 February 2014)
- Biggest away win: Heist 0–6 Tubize (8 February 2014); Hoogstraten 0–6 Tubize (1 March 2014)
- Highest scoring: Heist 2–7 Antwerp (11 August 2013)

The 2013–14 season of the Belgian Second Division (also known as Belgacom League for sponsorship reasons) began on 2 August 2013 and ended on 27 April 2014.

== Team changes ==
After promotion and relegation, only 15 teams of the previous season remained in the league, with 3 others being replaced:

=== Out ===
- Oostende were promoted as champions of the previous season.
- Oudenaarde was relegated to the Third Division after finishing 17th.
- Sint-Niklaas was relegated to the Third Division after finishing 18th.

=== In ===
- Hoogstraten promoted as champions from Third Division A.
- Virton promoted as champions from Third Division B.
- Verbroedering Geel-Meerhout was promoted after winning the third division playoffs and changed their name before the season started to ASV Geel.

== Team information ==
| Club | City | First season of current spell in second division | Coming from | 2012-13 result | Stadium | Capacity |
|---|---|---|---|---|---|---|
| SC Eendracht Aalst | Aalst | 2011–12 | Belgian Third Division | 13th (D2) | Pierre Cornelisstadion | 7,500 |
| Royal Antwerp F.C. | Antwerp | 2004–05 | Belgian Pro League | 10th (D2) | Bosuilstadion | 16,649 |
| Boussu Dour Borinage | Boussu | 2009–10 | Belgian Third Division | 5th (D2) | Stade Robert Urbain | 2,000 |
| K.F.C. Dessel Sport | Dessel | 2012–13 | Belgian Third Division | 12th (D2) | Lorzestraat | 5,000 |
| K.A.S. Eupen | Eupen | 2011–12 | Belgian Pro League | 8th (D2) | Kehrweg Stadion | 8,000 |
| AS Verbroedering Geel | Geel | 2013–14 | Belgian Third Division | 3rd (D3A) | De Leunen | 10,022 |
| K.S.K. Heist | Heist-op-den-Berg | 2010–11 | Belgian Third Division | 16th (D2) | Gemeentelijk Sportcentrum | 3,000 |
| Lommel United | Lommel | 2005–06 | Belgian Third Division | 6th (D2) | Soevereinstadion | 12,500 |
| Royal Mouscron-Péruwelz | Mouscron | 2012–13 | Belgian Third Division | 2nd (D2) | Stade Le Canonnier | 10,800 |
| K.S.V. Roeselare | Roeselare | 2010–11 | Belgian Pro League | 11th (D2) | Schiervelde Stadion | 9,075 |
| RWDM Brussels FC | Brussels | 2008–09 | Belgian Pro League | 14th (D2) | Edmond Machtens Stadium | 11,000 |
| K. Sint-Truidense V.V. | Sint-Truiden | 2012–13 | Belgian Pro League | 4th (D2) | Stayen | 11,250 |
| A.F.C. Tubize | Tubize | 2009–10 | Belgian Pro League | 9th (D2) | Stade Leburton | 9,000 |
| C.S. Visé | Wezet | 2010–11 | Belgian Third Division | 15th (D2) | Stade de la Cité de l'Oie | 6,000 |
| K.V.C. Westerlo | Westerlo | 2012–13 | Belgian Pro League | 3rd (D2) | Het Kuipje | 7,982 |
| R. White Star Bruxelles | Brussels | 2011–12 | Belgian Third Division | 7th (D2) | Stade Fallon | 2,500 |
| R.E. Virton | Virton | 2013–14 | Belgian Third Division | 1st (D3B) | Stade Yvan Georges | 4,000 |
| Hoogstraten VV | Hoogstraten | 2013–14 | Belgian Third Division | 1st (D3A) | Sportcomplex Seminarie | 5,000 |

Locations of the 2013–14 Belgian Second Division teams

== Regular season ==
=== League table ===
| Pos | Team | Pld | W | D | L | GF | GA | GD | Pts | Promotion or relegation |
|---|---|---|---|---|---|---|---|---|---|---|
| 1 | Westerlo (C, P) | 34 | 24 | 6 | 4 | 68 | 23 | +45 | 78 | Promoted to Belgian First Division |
| 2 | Eupen | 34 | 22 | 8 | 4 | 75 | 27 | +48 | 74 | Qualified for Promotion play-off |
| 3 | Sint-Truiden | 34 | 20 | 7 | 7 | 51 | 31 | +20 | 67 | Qualified for Promotion play-off |
| 4 | Mouscron-Péruwelz (P) | 34 | 20 | 6 | 8 | 53 | 27 | +26 | 66 | Qualified for Promotion play-off |
| 5 | Lommel | 34 | 16 | 11 | 7 | 56 | 34 | +22 | 59 | |
| 6 | Tubize | 34 | 15 | 9 | 10 | 59 | 45 | +14 | 54 | |
| 7 | Antwerp | 34 | 13 | 10 | 11 | 47 | 35 | +12 | 49 | |
| 8 | Brussels (R) | 34 | 12 | 9 | 13 | 38 | 42 | −4 | 45 | Relegation to 2014–15 Belgian Third Division (Note: Following the conclusion of the season, RWDM Brussels was refused a license for the following season, forcing them to be relegated to the Belgian Third Division, where they were to start the 2014–15 season on -3 points. As a result, Hoogstraten was saved from direct relegation and instead forced to play the relegation playoff instead of Heist. Heist was allowed to remain in the Second Division. Hoogstraten lost the relegation playoff and was relegated.) |
| 9 | Borinage | 34 | 12 | 9 | 13 | 45 | 51 | −6 | 45 | |
| 10 | ASV Geel | 34 | 11 | 10 | 13 | 45 | 49 | −4 | 43 | |
| 11 | Aalst | 34 | 11 | 9 | 14 | 37 | 48 | −11 | 42 | |
| 12 | WS Bruxelles | 34 | 10 | 10 | 14 | 37 | 38 | −1 | 40 | |
| 13 | Virton | 34 | 10 | 8 | 16 | 47 | 48 | −1 | 38 | |
| 14 | Roeselare | 34 | 8 | 11 | 15 | 41 | 62 | −21 | 35 | |
| 15 | Dessel | 34 | 10 | 5 | 19 | 37 | 60 | −23 | 35 | |
| 16 | Heist | 34 | 7 | 10 | 17 | 38 | 74 | −36 | 31 | Spared from relegation |
| 17 | Hoogstraten (R) | 34 | 7 | 7 | 20 | 33 | 61 | −28 | 28 | Qualification for Relegation play-off |
| 18 | Visé (R) | 34 | 2 | 7 | 25 | 26 | 77 | −51 | 13 | Relegation to 2014–15 Belgian Third Division |

Source: Belgian Second Division
Rules for classification: Rules for classification: 1) points; 2) number of matches won; if teams are still tied a playoff is organised.
(C) Champions; (P) Promoted; (R) Relegated

=== Period winners ===
Like before, the season was divided into three periods. The first ten matchdays together form the first period, matchdays 11 to 22 form period two and the last 12 form period three. The three period winners take part in the Belgian Second Division final round together with the winner of the 2013–14 Belgian Pro League relegation playoff. The winner of this final round gets to play in the 2014–15 Belgian Pro League.

Eupen and Westerlo respectively won the first and second period and qualified for the final round. But as eventual champions Westerlo also won the third period, this left two spots open for Sint-Truiden and Mouscron-Péruwelz to qualify as highest placed finishers (third and fourth in the league respectively) who had not already qualified.

==== Period 1 ====
| Pos | Team | Pld | W | D | L | GF | GA | GD | Pts | Qualification |
|---|---|---|---|---|---|---|---|---|---|---|
| 1 | Eupen (Q) | 10 | 8 | 2 | 0 | 29 | 8 | +21 | 26 | Belgian Second Division final round |
| 2 | Mouscron-Péruwelz | 10 | 8 | 1 | 1 | 22 | 7 | +15 | 25 | |
| 3 | Westerlo | 10 | 6 | 4 | 0 | 19 | 9 | +10 | 22 | |
| 4 | Sint-Truiden | 10 | 6 | 4 | 0 | 14 | 6 | +8 | 22 | |
| 5 | Antwerp | 10 | 6 | 3 | 1 | 20 | 6 | +14 | 21 | |

Source: Belgische Tweede Klasse
Rules for classification: Rules for classification: 1) points; 2) number of matches won; if teams are still tied a playoff is organised.
(Q) Qualified for the phase indicated

==== Period 2 ====
| Pos | Team | Pld | W | D | L | GF | GA | GD | Pts | Qualification |
|---|---|---|---|---|---|---|---|---|---|---|
| 1 | Westerlo (Q) | 12 | 8 | 1 | 3 | 22 | 11 | +11 | 25 | Belgian Second Division final round (Note: Westerlo was automatically promoted due to winning the overall title. The second period winner spot was given to the highest finisher in the overall league not yet entitled to play in the playoffs.) |
| 2 | Tubize | 12 | 6 | 4 | 2 | 23 | 13 | +10 | 22 | |
| 3 | Lommel | 12 | 6 | 3 | 3 | 20 | 11 | +9 | 21 | |
| 4 | Eupen | 12 | 5 | 5 | 2 | 19 | 14 | +5 | 20 | |
| 5 | Sint-Truiden | 12 | 6 | 1 | 5 | 14 | 13 | +1 | 19 | |

Source: Belgische Tweede Klasse
Rules for classification: Rules for classification: 1) points; 2) number of matches won; if teams are still tied a playoff is organised.
(Q) Qualified for the phase indicated

==== Period 3 ====
| Pos | Team | Pld | W | D | L | GF | GA | GD | Pts | Qualification |
|---|---|---|---|---|---|---|---|---|---|---|
| 1 | Westerlo (Q) | 12 | 10 | 1 | 1 | 26 | 3 | +23 | 31 | Belgian Second Division final round (Note: Westerlo was automatically promoted due to winning the overall title. The third period winner spot was given to the highest finisher in the overall league not yet entitled to play in the playoffs.) |
| 2 | Lommel | 12 | 9 | 2 | 1 | 27 | 11 | +16 | 29 | |
| 3 | Eupen | 12 | 9 | 1 | 2 | 27 | 5 | +22 | 28 | |
| 4 | Sint-Truiden | 12 | 8 | 2 | 2 | 19 | 8 | +11 | 26 | |
| 5 | Mouscron-Péruwelz | 12 | 7 | 2 | 3 | 18 | 11 | +7 | 23 | |

Source: Belgische Tweede Klasse
Rules for classification: Rules for classification: 1) points; 2) number of matches won; if teams are still tied a playoff is organised.
(Q) Qualified for the phase indicated

=== Results ===
| Home \ Away | AAL | ANT | BDB | DES | EUP | GEE | HEI | HOO | LOM | MOU | ROE | RWD | STV | TUB | VIR | VIS | WES | WSB |
|---|---|---|---|---|---|---|---|---|---|---|---|---|---|---|---|---|---|---|
| Aalst | | 1–0 | 0–4 | 0–0 | 0–2 | 1–1 | 2–0 | 1–1 | 2–2 | 2–3 | 4–1 | 2–1 | 1–1 | 0–2 | 3–0 | 1–1 | 1–0 | 0–2 |
| Antwerp | 2–0 | | 0–2 | 1–0 | 0–0 | 1–1 | 3–0 | 0–0 | 1–0 | 0–1 | 1–1 | 4–1 | 0–5 (Note: Sint-Truiden was awarded a 0-5 win after Antwerp supporters invaded the pitch after 24 minutes with Sint-Truiden leading 0-1.) | 1–3 | 1–0 | 1–1 | 2–0 | 2–1 |
| Borinage | 2–1 | 1–1 | | 2–0 | 0–4 | 2–1 | 2–1 | 1–2 | 2–2 | 1–1 | 3–0 | 0–1 | 1–2 | 1–2 | 2–3 | 2–1 | 0–0 | 2–1 |
| Dessel | 2–0 | 2–0 | 5–1 | | 1–0 | 3–3 | 1–0 | 0–2 | 2–3 | 0–5 | 1–2 | 0–1 | 0–2 | 2–2 | 2–2 | 1–4 | 0–2 | 0–1 |
| Eupen | 2–0 | 1–0 | 2–2 | 5–0 | | 4–2 | 5–1 | 5–2 | 3–2 | 0–1 | 4–2 | 1–0 | 0–1 | 2–2 | 4–0 | 4–2 | 1–0 | 1–0 |
| ASV Geel | 0–1 | 2–2 | 3–0 | 1–2 | 0–2 | | 4–3 | 2–1 | 0–3 | 0–1 | 3–1 | 2–0 | 1–0 | 1–2 | 2–1 | 1–1 | 1–3 | 1–1 |
| Heist | 2–2 | 2–7 | 0–0 | 2–1 | 1–1 | 1–1 | | 2–1 | 1–1 | 1–2 | 3–0 | 3–1 | 0–2 | 0–6 | 2–1 | 1–1 | 0–3 | 1–1 |
| Hoogstraten | 2–0 | 2–0 | 2–3 | 1–3 | 0–6 | 1–3 | 0–1 | | 2–5 | 0–4 | 1–0 | 2–2 | 0–2 | 1–2 | 0–3 | 1–1 | 1–1 | 1–2 |
| Lommel | 3–0 | 1–0 | 3–1 | 1–1 | 1–1 | 0–0 | 0–0 | 2–1 | | 3–1 | 0–0 | 1–0 | 1–0 | 3–0 | 1–0 | 5–1 | 0–2 | 1–1 |
| Mouscron-Péruwelz | 0–0 | 1–0 | 0–0 | 3–1 | 1–2 | 2–1 | 5–0 | 2–1 | 2–1 | | 2–0 | 0–1 | 1–1 | 0–1 | 0–0 | 2–1 | 0–1 | 2–1 |
| Roeselare | 0–2 | 1–1 | 3–2 | 2–5 | 2–2 | 1–1 | 2–1 | 0–1 | 3–1 | 1–1 | | 0–1 | 2–2 | 3–3 | 2–0 | 3–1 | 1–2 | 0–0 |
| RWDM Brussels | 1–1 | 1–1 | 1–1 | 2–0 | 1–3 | 1–1 | 5–0 | 1–1 | 2–0 | 1–2 | 3–2 | | 1–0 | 1–3 | 2–1 | 2–0 | 1–2 | 0–0 |
| Sint-Truiden | 2–0 | 1–1 | 2–1 | 1–0 | 0–3 | 2–0 | 2–1 | 3–0 | 1–2 | 2–1 | 1–1 | 1–0 | | 3–2 | 2–5 | 2–1 | 3–2 | 1–0 |
| Tubize | 3–1 | 0–2 | 1–3 | 3–0 | 0–1 | 0–1 | 2–2 | 0–0 | 0–3 | 0–1 | 2–0 | 1–1 | 0–1 | | 1–0 | 3–2 | 2–2 | 0–3 |
| Virton | 1–2 | 0–3 | 3–0 | 3–0 | 1–1 | 0–2 | 3–3 | 1–0 | 0–0 | 0–2 | 1–1 | 5–0 (Note: Excelsior Virton was awarded a 5-0 win when RWDM Brussels was suspended temporarily for paying its six former players beyond the set deadline but before the game was played.) | 0–0 | 1–1 | | 5–0 | 0–1 | 3–2 |
| Visé | 1–4 | 1–5 | 0–1 | 0–1 | 0–0 | 0–1 | 0–1 | 0–3 | 0–2 | 1–3 | 1–3 | 0–2 | 1–0 | 1–6 | 0–4 | | 0–1 | 1–1 |
| Westerlo | 4–0 | 2–1 | 3–0 | 3–0 | 1–0 | 4–1 | 2–1 | 2–0 | 2–1 | 1–0 | 6–0 | 1–0 | 1–1 | 2–2 | 5–0 | 2–0 | | 3–3 |
| WS Brussels | 1–2 | 0–3 | 0–0 | 0–1 | 0–2 | 2–1 | 5–1 | 1–0 | 2–2 | 1–2 | 0–1 | 0–0 | 0–1 | 0–2 | 1–0 | 3–1 | 0–1 | |

Updated to match(es) played on 27 April 2014. Source: Soccerway
Legend: Blue = home team win; Yellow = draw; Red = away team win.

== Season statistics ==
=== Top scorers ===
Source: Soccerway

Up to and including matches played on 16 May.

| Rank | Player | Club | Goals |
|---|---|---|---|
| 1 | (Ivory Coast) Koffi | Westerlo (6) & Boussu Dour (13) | 19 |
| 2 | (Belgium) Michael Lallemand | Eupen | 18 |
| 3 | (Belgium) Nils Schouterden | Eupen | 16 |
| 4 | (Netherlands) Sherjill MacDonald | Westerlo | 14 |
| 5 | (Netherlands) Romero Regales | Lommel United | 13 |
| 6 | (Belgium) Jason Adesanya | ASV Geel | 12 |
| 6 | (Belgium) Emrullah Güvenç | Antwerp | 12 |
| 6 | (Belgium) Bart Webers | Heist | 12 |
| 6 | (France) Florian Taulemesse | Eupen | 12 |
| 10 | (Belgium) Anthony Di Lallo | Roeselare | 11 |
| 10 | (Benin) Frédéric Gounongbe | RWDM Brussels | 11 |
| 10 | (France) Seïd Khiter | Mouscron-Péruwelz | 11 |
| 10 | (France) Florent Stevance | Boussu Dour | 11 |
| 14 | (Belgium) Bart Goor | RWDM Brussels | 10 |
| 14 | (France) Philippe Liard | Tubize | 10 |
| 14 | (Democratic Republic of the Congo) Ibrahim Somé | Sint-Truiden | 10 |

9 goals (7 players)

- (Belgium) Bart Goor (Dessel Sport)
- (France) Florian Taulemesse (Eupen)
- (Belgium) Frédéric Gounongbe (RWDM Brussels)
- (Belgium) Mohammed Aoulad (Sint-Truiden)
- (Belgium) Joeri Dequevy (Sint-Truiden)
- (Guinea) Lonsana Doumbouya (Tubize)
- (Belgium) Philippe Liard (Tubize)

8 goals (8 players)

- (Belgium) Wesley Vanbelle (Aalst)
- (Netherlands) Sandro Calabro (Antwerp)
- (Belgium) Sven De Rechter (Roeselare)
- (Belgium) Dieter Van Tornhout (Roeselare)
- (Belgium) Grégory Dufer (Sint-Truiden)
- (Haiti) Gary Ambroise (Tubize)
- (Belgium) Leandro Bailly (Tubize)
- (France) Samy Kehli (Virton)

7 goals (7 players)

- (Bulgaria) Aleksandar Kolev (ASV Geel)
- (Belgium) Simon Vermeiren (Heist)
- (Belgium) Wouter Scheelen (Lommel United)
- (France) Grégory Molnar (Virton)
- (Belgium) Arnaud Biatour (Visé)
- (Belgium) Fayçal Rherras (Visé)
- (Guinea-Bissau) Basile de Carvalho (WS Brussels)

6 goals (8 players)

- (Greece) Stavros Glouftsis (Aalst)
- (Belgium) Omar Bennassar (Dessel Sport)
- (South Africa) Phakamani Mngadi (Eupen)
- (Ivory Coast) Moussa Traoré (Hoogstraten)
- (Belgium) Loris Brogno (Lommel United)
- (Belgium) Zinho Gano (Lommel United)
- (Belgium) Mathieu Cornet (Virton)
- (Belgium) Raphaël Lecomte (Westerlo)

5 goals (10 players)

- (France) Jordan Faucher (Antwerp)
- (Democratic Republic of the Congo) Freddy Mombongo-Dues (Antwerp)
- (Netherlands) Kevin Tano (Antwerp)
- (France) Anice Badri (Mouscron-Péruwelz)
- (France) Harlem Gnohéré (Mouscron-Péruwelz)
- (France) Kevin Vandendriessche (Mouscron-Péruwelz)
- (France) Sofian Kheyari (Tubize)
- (France) Yohan Croizet (Virton)
- (Belgium) Laurens Paulussen (Westerlo)
- (Colombia) Jaime Ruiz (Westerlo)

4 goals (20 players)

- (Belgium) Arne Hoefnagels (ASV Geel)
- (Belgium) Marijn Steurs (ASV Geel)
- (France) Romain Tainmont (Boussu Dour)
- (Belgium) Ratko Vansimpsen (Dessel Sport)
- (Spain) Juan Ochoa (Eupen)
- (Belgium) Yannick Rymenants (Heist)
- (Netherlands) Tom Boere (Hoogstraten)
- (Belgium) Ruben Tilburgs (Hoogstraten)
- (Belgium) Toon Lenaerts (Lommel United)
- (Belgium) Glenn Neven (Lommel United)
- (France) Julian Michel (Mouscron-Péruwelz)
- (France) Nicolas Perez (Mouscron-Péruwelz)
- (Belgium) Sami Lkoutbi (RWDM Brussels)
- (France) Mikael Seoudi (RWDM Brussels)
- (France) Yohan Dufour (Virton)
- (Belgium) Maxime Annys (Westerlo)
- (Belgium) Jens Cools (Westerlo)
- (Belgium) Kevin Vandenbergh (Westerlo)
- (Senegal) Amady Diop (WS Brussels)
- (Senegal) Mamadou Fall (WS Brussels)

3 goals (31 players)

- (Belgium) Donjet Shkodra (Aalst)
- (Belgium) Ken Van Damme (Aalst)
- (France) Mathieu Manset (Antwerp)
- (Belgium) Jo Christiaens (ASV Geel)
- (Belgium) Kenneth Kerckhofs (ASV Geel)
- (France) Lilian Bochet (Boussu Dour)
- (France) Jean-François Christophe (Boussu Dour)
- (France) Rachid Mourabit (Boussu Dour)
- (Ghana) Prince Asubonteng (Dessel Sport)
- (Belgium) Zico Gielis (Dessel Sport)
- (Belgium) Roy Meeus (Dessel Sport)
- (Ghana) Samuel Asamoah (Eupen)
- (Belgium) Bram Criel (Heist)
- (Belgium) Jonas Vandermarliere (Heist)
- (Belgium) Roy Van der Linden (Hoogstraten)
- (Belgium) Jentl Gaethofs (Lommel United)
- (Belgium) Thomas Jutten (Lommel United)
- (Belgium) Yohan Brouckaert (Mouscron-Péruwelz)
- (Belgium) Jean-François Mbuba (Roeselare)
- (Belgium) Nils Sarrazyn (Roeselare)
- (Belgium) Tortol Lembi (Sint-Truiden)
- (Belgium) Rob Schoofs (Sint-Truiden)
- (Belgium) Jonathan Heris (Tubize)
- (Burundi) Dugary Ndabashinze (Tubize)
- (Cameroon) Hervé Onana (Tubize)
- (Belgium) David Vandenbroeck (Tubize)
- (Belgium) Jarno Molenberghs (Westerlo)
- (Belgium) Kenneth Schuermans (Westerlo)
- (Belgium) Leandro Trossard (Westerlo)
- (Belgium) Roméo Debefve (WS Brussels)
- (Belgium) Yannick Loemba (WS Brussels)

2 goals (36 players)

- (Belgium) Steve Bael (Aalst)
- (Belgium) Jonas Bogaerts (Aalst)
- (Belgium) Kevin Janssens (Aalst)
- (Belgium) Ben Santermans (Aalst)
- (Belgium) Nick Van Belle (Aalst)
- (Rwanda) Salomon Nirisarike (Antwerp)
- (Ghana) Gideon Boateng (ASV Geel)
- (Belgium) Thomas Frederix (ASV Geel)
- (France) Alexandre Lauriente (Boussu Dour)
- (Belgium) Hans Hannes (Dessel Sport)
- (Belgium) Dries Van Lommel (Dessel Sport)
- (Nigeria) Anthony Bassey (Eupen)
- (Mali) Alassane Diallo (Eupen)
- (Spain) Manel Expósito (Eupen)
- (Belgium) Christian Kabasele (Eupen)
- (Belgium) Nick Van Huffel (Hoogstraten)
- (Belgium) Sam Vanaken (Lommel United)
- (France) Benjamin Delacourt (Mouscron-Péruwelz)
- (Mali) Abdoulay Diaby (Mouscron-Péruwelz)
- (Croatia) Antonio Jakoliš (Mouscron-Péruwelz)
- (France) Dimitri Mohamed (Mouscron-Péruwelz)
- (Montenegro) Petar Bojović (Roeselare)
- (France) Yohan Boli (Roeselare)
- (Brazil) Marcos Camozzato (Roeselare)
- (Belgium) Hakan Bilgiç (RWDM Brussels)
- (Belgium) Hamid Bouyfoulkitne (RWDM Brussels)
- (Burundi) David Habarugira (RWDM Brussels)
- (Belgium) Guy Dufour (Sint-Truiden)
- (Uruguay) Guillermo Méndez (Sint-Truiden)
- (Belgium) Pierre Gevaert (Tubize)
- (Belgium) Jonathan Benteke (Visé)
- (Belgium) Alessio Cascio (Visé)
- (Belgium) Daan De Pever (Visé)
- (Germany) Ioannis Masmanidis (Visé)
- (Belgium) Luigi Vaccaro (Visé)
- (Belgium) Kevin Geudens (Westerlo)

1 goal (77 players)

- (Bosnia and Herzegovina) Armin Čerimagić (Aalst)
- (Belgium) Gianni De Neve (Aalst)
- (Belgium) Niels Martin (Aalst)
- (Cameroon) Yves Ngasseu (Aalst)
- (Belgium) Mike Smet (Aalst)
- (Belgium) Thomas Weydisch (Aalst)
- (Netherlands) Roy Bakkenes (Antwerp)
- (England) John Bostock (Antwerp)
- (Belgium) David Iboma (Antwerp)
- (Netherlands) Kelvin Maynard (Antwerp)
- (Italy) Davide Petrucci (Antwerp)
- (Belgium) Christophe Bertjens (ASV Geel)
- (Belgium) Hannes Meeus (ASV Geel)
- (Belgium) Ken Van Mierlo (ASV Geel)
- (Belgium) Stefan Belic (Boussu Dour)
- (France) Julien Berthomier (Boussu Dour)
- (Morocco) Chemcedine El Araichi (Boussu Dour)
- (Belgium) Nassim Saadi (Boussu Dour)
- (Belgium) Ivan Mateso (Dessel Sport)
- (Belgium) Kurt Remen (Dessel Sport)
- (France) Kevin Tapoko (Dessel Sport)
- (Belgium) Jonathan D'Ostilio (Eupen)
- (Cameroon) Raoul Kenne (Eupen)
- (Belgium) Mukoni Mata (Eupen)
- (Spain) Lucas Porcar (Eupen)
- (South Africa) Ntuthoko Radebe (Eupen)
- (Belgium) Jorn Rijmenams (Heist)
- (Belgium) Raphaël Thys (Heist)
- (Belgium) Jeroen Vanderputte (Heist)
- (Belgium) Ivan Yagan (Heist)
- (Belgium) Bart Cornelissen (Hoogstraten)
- (Belgium) Koen Gommers (Hoogstraten)
- (Serbia) Milan Savić (Hoogstraten)
- (Belgium) Thijs Schrauwen (Hoogstraten)
- (Belgium) Jorne Segers (Hoogstraten)
- (Belgium) Glenn Van der Linden (Hoogstraten)
- (Belgium) Ken Debauve (Lommel United)
- (Belgium) Christopher Verbist (Lommel United)
- (France) Sébastien Aliotte (Mouscron-Péruwelz)
- (France) Sanaa Altama (Mouscron-Péruwelz)
- (France) Anthony Bova (Mouscron-Péruwelz)
- (Belgium) Jérémy Huygebaert (Mouscron-Péruwelz)
- (France) Thibault Peyre (Mouscron-Péruwelz)
- (Belgium) Daniel Ternest (Roeselare)
- (Belgium) Bram Vandenbussche (Roeselare)
- (Belgium) Geoffrey Cabeke (RWDM Brussels)
- (Guinea) Lanfia Camara (RWDM Brussels)
- (Burkina Faso) Mahamoudou Kéré (RWDM Brussels)
- (Chad) Kévin Nicaise (RWDM Brussels)
- (Burkina Faso) Jérôme Nollevaux (RWDM Brussels)
- (Belgium) Naïm Aarab (Sint-Truiden)
- (Belgium) Giel Deferm (Sint-Truiden)
- (Belgium) Edmilson (Sint-Truiden)
- (France) Yvan Erichot (Sint-Truiden)
- (Italy) Alessandro Iandoli (Sint-Truiden)
- (Belgium) Mathias Schils (Sint-Truiden)
- (Belgium) Olivier Vinamont (Tubize)
- (Luxembourg) Guy Blaise (Virton)
- (Belgium) Simon Dupuis (Virton)
- (Belgium) Marvin Etienne (Virton)
- (France) Valentin Focki (Virton)
- (Benin) Arsène Menessou (Virton)
- (France) Jordan Yéyé (Virton)
- (Belgium) Pierre-Alain Laloux (Visé)
- (Belgium) Philippe Janssens (Westerlo)
- (Nigeria) Kennedy Nwanganga (Westerlo)
- (Belgium) Jeffrey Rentmeister (Westerlo)
- (Belgium) Jeroen Vanthournout (Westerlo)
- (Morocco) Chakhir Belghazouani (WS Brussels)
- (France) Grégory Christ (WS Brussels)
- (France) Mehdi Courgnaud (WS Brussels)
- (Belgium) Soufiane El Banouhi (WS Brussels)
- (Belgium) Michel Goffin (WS Brussels)
- (France) Jessim Mahaya (WS Brussels)
- (Algeria) Hemza Mihoubi (WS Brussels)
- (Senegal) Elhadji Ndoye (WS Brussels)
- (Senegal) Noël Soumah (WS Brussels)

1 Own goal (10 players)

- (Belgium) Stijn Minne (ASV Geel, scored for Heist)
- (Belgium) Miguel Dachelet (Heist, scored for Tubize)
- (Belgium) Roel Engelen (Hoogstraten, scored for Eupen)
- (Belgium) Stéphane Pichot (Mouscron-Péruwelz, scored for Visé)
- (Belgium) Bram Vandenbussche (Roeselare, scored for Hoogstraten)
- (France) Constant Delsanne (Tubize, scored for Lommel United)
- (Belgium) Philippe Liard (Tubize, scored for Eupen)
- (France) Yoann Grosperrin (Virton, scored for Aalst)
- (Belgium) Luigi Vaccaro (Visé, scored for Lommel United)
- (Senegal) Elhadji Ndoye (WS Brussels, scored for Westerlo)
