= Daniel Oliveira (footballer, born 1985) =

Brazilian footballer

Personal information
- Full name: Daniel Rodrigo de Oliveira
- Date of birth: 14 September 1985 (age 41)
- Place of birth: Brazil
- Height: 1.80 m (5 ft 11 in)
- Position: Forward

Team information
- Current team: Lokeren-Temse
- Number: 11

Senior career*
Years	Team	Apps	(Gls)
2002–2004	Guarani		
2004–2006	Palmeiras		
2006	Araçatuba		
2006–2007	Portuguesa		
2007–2008	Hamme	30	(8)
2008–2011	Sportkring Sint-Niklaas	69	(39)
2010	→ JV Lideral (loan)		
2011	Rupel Boom	13	(6)
2011–2013	White Star Bruxelles	57	(26)
2013–2014	Metalurh Donetsk	10	(1)
2014–2015	Eendracht Aalst		
2015	Al-Ettifaq	9	(8)
2015	Deinze	18	(3)
2016–2017	Cercle Brugge	7	(3)
2017–2018	Cercle Brugge II		
2018–2019	Mandel United		
2019–2020	Knokke	24	(7)
2020–	Lokeren-Temse		
- * Club domestic league appearances and goals as of 18:56, 4 February 2021 (UTC)

Daniel Rodrigo de Oliveira (born 14 September 1985) is a Brazilian footballer who plays as a forward for Belgian amateur side Lokeren-Temse.

== Career ==
He initially played in his native Brazil before moving to Belgium where he spent the majority of his career playing in the Belgian Second Division and Belgian Third Division before moving to Ukraine.

On June 20, 2013, he signed 1+2 years contract with FC Metalurh Donetsk.

== Personal life ==
Oliveira is married, him and wife Milena have a son called Caua.

== Career statistics ==
As of match played 3 May 2014.

Club	Season	League		National Cup		Other		Total	
Club	Season	Apps	Goals	Apps	Goals	Apps	Goals	Apps	Goals
Hamme	2007–08	30	8	—	—	—	—	30	8
Hamme	Total	30	8	—	—	—	—	30	8
Sportkring Sint-Niklaas	2008–09	25	15	—	—	—	—	25	15
Sportkring Sint-Niklaas	2009–10	31	19	—	—	—	—	31	19
Sportkring Sint-Niklaas	2010–11	13	5	—	—	—	—	13	5
Sportkring Sint-Niklaas	Total	69	39	—	—	—	—	69	39
Rupel Boom	2010–11	13	6	—	—	—	—	13	6
Rupel Boom	Total	13	6	—	—	—	—	13	6
White Star Bruxelles	2011–12	30	12	1	0	0	0	31	12
White Star Bruxelles	2012–13	27	14	2	1	0	0	29	15
White Star Bruxelles	Total	57	26	3	1	0	0	60	27
Metalurh Donetsk	2013–14	10	1	1	0	3	1	14	2
Metalurh Donetsk	Total	10	1	1	0	3	1	14	2
Career total		179	80	4	1	3	1	186	82
