= Kamel Ouejdide =

French-Moroccan footballer (1980–2024)

Personal information
- Date of birth: 1 May 1980
- Place of birth: Rabat, Morocco
- Date of death: 14 September 2024 (aged 44)
- Height: 1.81 m (5 ft 11 in)
- Position: Striker

Senior career*
Years	Team	Apps	(Gls)
1997–2002	Caen	10	(1)
2001–2002	→ Red Star (loan)	5	(1)
2002	Göztepe	10	(0)
2003–2004	Fortuna Düsseldorf	24	(7)
2004–2005	ASOA Valence	31	(11)
2005–2006	FC Sète	30	(3)
2006–2008	Clermont	39	(20)
2008	Cannes	11	(0)
2009–2010	Racing de Ferrol	19	(4)
2010–2013	Boussu Dour Borinage	58	(29)
2013–2014	WS Bruxelles	3	(0)
Total		240	(76)
- * Club domestic league appearances and goals

Kamel Ouejdide (Arabic: كامل وجديد; 1 May 1980 – 14 September 2024) was a French-Moroccan professional footballer who played as a striker.

== Death ==
Ouejdide died on 14 September 2024, at the age of 44.

== Career statistics ==
Appearances and goals by club, season and competition
Club	Season	League		
Club	Season	Division	Apps	Goals
Caen	1997–98	Ligue 2	1	0
Caen	1998–99	Ligue 2	1	0
Caen	1999-00	Ligue 2	8	1
Caen	2001–02	Ligue 2	0	0
Caen	Total		10	1
Red Star	2000–01	National	5	1
Göztepe	2002–03	Süper Lig	10	0
Fortuna Düsseldorf	2003–04	Oberliga Nordrhein	24	7
ASOA Valence	2004–05	National	31	11
FC Sète	2005–06	Ligue 2	30	3
Clermont	2006–07	National	30	19
Clermont	2007–08	Ligue 2	9	1
Clermont	Total		39	20
Cannes	2008	National	11	0
Racing de Ferrol	2009–10	Segunda División B	19	4
Boussu Dour Borinage	2010–11	Belgian Second Division	24	17
Boussu Dour Borinage	2011–12	Belgian Second Division	3	0
Boussu Dour Borinage	2012–13	Belgian Second Division	31	12
Boussu Dour Borinage	Total		58	29
WS Bruxelles	2013–14	Belgian Second Division	3	0
Career total			240	76
