= Lanfia Camara =

Guinean footballer

Personal information
- Full name: Lanfia Camara
- Date of birth: 3 October 1986 (age 40)
- Place of birth: Conakry, Guinea
- Height: 1.85 m (6 ft 1 in)
- Positions: Midfielder; defender

Team information
- Current team: FC Ganshoren

Senior career*
Years	Team	Apps	(Gls)
2004–2009	FC Ganshoren		
2009–2010	Tempo Overijse		
2010–2013	White Star Woluwe	84	(4)
2013–2014	FC Brussels	14	(1)
2014–2015	KRC Mechelen	14	(0)
2015–2016	Patro Eisden	17	(0)
2016–2017	Lokeren-Temse	3	(0)
2017–	FC Ganshoren	164	(6)

International career
2012–2015	Guinea	14	(0)
- * Club domestic league appearances and goals as of 1 August 2024

Lanfia Camara (born 3 October 1986) is a Guinean football defender who plays in Belgium for FC Ganshoren.

== Career ==
Born in Conakry, Camara moved to Belgium at age 18. He had played in Guinea's youth national teams, but began playing in the Belgian provincial leagues with Tempo Overijse. Eventually, he joined Brussels side White Star Woluwe F.C. and helped them gain promotion to the Belgian Second Division. In the summer of 2013, he signed for local rivals and fellow Second Division side FC Brussels. Since August 2014 he plays for Belgian second division club KRC Mechelen
