= Schamp =

Schamp may refer to:

- 6376 Schamp, a main-belt asteroid
- Mathias Schamp (born 1988), a Belgian footballer
