= Belgian Second Division play-offs 2011–20 =

Belgian football league play-offs

This article gives a summary of results for the Belgian Second Division play-offs from 2011 to 2015.

After the reformation of Belgian Football League system in 2016, the Belgian Second Division play-offs was scrapped. An expanded Europa League playoff of the new Belgian First Division A was created, which consists three teams from the new Belgian First Division B. But these teams, unlike teams before, were not eligible to promote through these playoffs. Only the champions of the newly established Belgian First Division B could be promoted from 2015-16 season to 2018-19 season. For 2019-20 season, due to coronavirus pandemic, relegation from Belgian First Division A, as well as the Europa League playoff, were cancelled, thus both of the split season winners were promoted. From 2020-21 season, Belgian First Division B has 1.5 promotion berths, which de facto resumed Belgian Second Division play-offs.

== 2011 ==
=== Qualifiers ===
The following teams qualified for the 2011 play-offs:

- Eupen for winning the Belgian Pro League Relegation Play-off.
- Lommel United for winning the first period of the 2010–11 Belgian Second Division
- Waasland-Beveren for winning the second period of the 2010–11 Belgian Second Division
- Mons as the best finishing team not yet entitled to play in the play-offs. Oud-Heverlee Leuven won the third period but was already directly promoted.

=== Results and table ===
Pos	Team	Pld	W	D	L	GF	GA	GD	Pts	MON	W-B	LOM	EUP
1	Mons	6	4	1	1	18	7	+11	13		2–2	4–0	3–1
2	Waasland-Beveren	6	4	1	1	13	9	+4	13	3–2		2–1	4–2
3	Lommel United	6	3	0	3	12	14	−2	9	1–5	2–1		4–1
4	Eupen	6	0	0	6	5	18	−13	0	0–2	0–1	1–4	

Legend: Blue = home team win; Yellow = draw; Red = away team win.

=== Test match ===
Since Mons and Waasland-Beveren finished with the same number of points and the same number of matches won, a test match was organised on a neutral ground to determine the play-off winner. Mons beat Waasland-Beveren due to a late goal and thus promotes to the Belgian Pro League.

29 May 2011
16:00 CEST

Mons	2 – 1	Waasland-Beveren
Jarju 43'; Timmermans 87'	Report	Bourabia 66'

Stade Leburton, Tubize
Referee: Peter Vervecken

== 2012 ==
=== Qualifiers ===
- Westerlo for winning the Belgian Pro League Relegation Play-off.
- Eupen for winning the first period of the 2011–12 Belgian Second Division.
- Waasland-Beveren for winning the third period of the 2011–12 Belgian Second Division.
- Oostende as the best finishing team not yet entitled to play in the play-offs (fourth place).

=== Results and table ===
Pos	Team	Pld	W	D	L	GF	GA	GD	Pts	W-B	EUP	WES	OOS
1	Waasland-Beveren	6	5	1	0	14	5	+9	16		2–0	3–1	4–1
2	Eupen	6	3	1	2	8	7	+1	10	1–2		2–1	1–0
3	Westerlo	6	1	2	3	9	9	0	5	1–2	1–1		5–1
4	Oostende	6	0	2	4	4	14	−10	2	1–1	1–3	0–0	

Legend: Blue = home team win; Yellow = draw; Red = away team win.

== 2013 ==
=== Qualifiers ===
- Cercle Brugge for winning the Belgian Pro League Relegation Play-off.
- WS Woluwe for winning the first period of the 2012–13 Belgian Second Division.
- Mouscron-Péruwelz and Westerlo as the best finishing teams not yet entitled to play in the play-offs (second and third place).

=== Results and table ===
Pos	Team	Pld	W	D	L	GF	GA	GD	Pts	CER	RMP	WES	WSW
1	Cercle Brugge	6	4	0	2	13	8	+5	12		1–2	1–0	4–0
2	Mouscron-Péruwelz	6	4	0	2	9	9	0	12	0–3		1–0	3–1
3	Westerlo	6	3	1	2	11	4	+7	10	5–0	3–1		1–1
4	WS Woluwe	6	0	1	5	4	16	−12	1	1–4	1–2	0–2	

Legend: Blue = home team win; Yellow = draw; Red = away team win.

== 2014 ==
=== Qualifiers ===
- OH Leuven, as winner of the Belgian Pro League Relegation Play-off.
- Eupen, as winner of the first period of the 2013–14 Belgian Second Division.
- Sint-Truiden and Mouscron-Péruwelz qualified as highest placed finishers in the 2013–14 Belgian Second Division (third and fourth respectively) who had not already qualified, as champions Westerlo won both the second and third period of the 2013–14 Belgian Second Division, leaving two spots open.

=== Results and table ===
Pos	Team	Pld	W	D	L	GF	GA	GD	Pts	RMP	EUP	STV	OHL
1	Mouscron-Péruwelz	6	3	2	1	9	6	+3	11		0–1	2–1	1–0
2	Eupen	6	2	2	2	9	11	−2	8	2–2		2–2	0–3
3	Sint-Truiden	6	2	1	3	10	12	−2	7	2–4	2–3		2–1
4	OH Leuven	6	2	1	3	6	5	+1	7	0–0	2–1	0–1	

Legend: Blue = home team win; Yellow = draw; Red = away team win.

Note: Sint-Truiden ranked ahead of OH Leuven on head to head results.

== 2015 ==
=== Qualifiers ===
- OH Leuven as winners of the first period.
- Lommel United as winners of the third period.
- Eupen as highest finishers in the league not already promoted or qualified, taking second period winners Sint-Truiden's spot, who were directly promoted after winning the title.
- Lierse as winner of the Belgian Pro League Relegation Play-off.

=== Results and table ===
Pos	Team	Pld	W	D	L	GF	GA	GD	Pts	Qualification	OHL	EUP	LIE	LOM
1	OH Leuven (O, P)	6	4	2	0	8	3	+5	14	2015–16 Belgian Pro League		1–1	0–0	3–1
2	Eupen	6	2	2	2	5	4	+1	8		0–1		0–1	1–0
3	Lierse	6	2	1	3	8	10	−2	7		1–2	1–3		4–2
4	Lommel United	6	1	1	4	6	10	−4	4		0–1	0–0	3–1	

Source: Soccerway
Legend: Blue = home team win; Yellow = draw; Red = away team win.
Rules for classification: 1) points; 2) number of matches won; 3) points obtained in matches between tied teams; 4) goals scored in matches between tied teams; 5) away goals scored in matches between tied teams; 6) testmatches (home + away)
(O) Play-off winners; (P) Promoted
