= Marco Villagatti =

Italian footballer

Personal information
- Date of birth: 15 May 1983 (age 43)
- Place of birth: Florence, Italy
- Position: Defender

Team information
- Current team: Ghivizzano Borgoamozzano

Youth career
- Empoli

Senior career*
Years	Team	Apps	(Gls)
2002–2003	Empoli	0	(0)
2002–2003	→ Tivoli (loan)	0	(0)
2003–2004	Sangiovannese	5	(0)
2004–2005	Sestese Fiorentino	25	(1)
2005–2006	Venturina		
2006–2010	Lecco	110	(7)
2010–2011	Matera	24	(1)
2011–2012	Entella	31	(1)
2012–2013	Visé	18	(0)
2013–2014	Sorrento	32	(1)
2014	Correggese		
2014–2015	Arezzo	30	(1)
2015–2016	Delta Rovigo	28	(2)
2016	Viareggio 2014	9	(0)
2016–2017	Massese	17	(1)
2017–	Ghivizzano Borgoamozzano	0	(0)
- * Club domestic league appearances and goals

Marco Villagatti (born 15 May 1983) is an Italian footballer who plays for Ghivizzano Borgoamozzano. His position he plays is defender.

== Biography ==
Born in Florence, Tuscany, Villagatti was signed by Tivoli from Tuscan team Empoli in summer 2002. In January 2003 he left for Sangiovannese in another loan. Despite only 3 league appearances, the team signed him in co-ownership. After no appearance in the whole 2003–04 Serie C2, Empoli gave up the remain 50% registration rights to Sangiovannese in June 2004.

He played the first 2 games of 2004–05 Serie C1, but transferred to Serie D club Sestese at the end of summer transfer window. He moved to another amateur club Venturina in 2005.

In 2006, he was signed by Serie C2 club Lecco, where he spent 6 professional seasons.

In 2010, he was signed by Matera. The club folded in 2011. In the same transfer window he was signed by Virtus Entella.

In 2012, he left for Belgian club Visé. in 2013 he returned to Italy for Sorrento.

On 16 September 2014 he was signed by Serie D club Correggese. However, on 2 October 2014 he returned to Lega Pro (Serie C) for Arezzo.
