= Anthony Di Lallo =

Belgian footballer (born 1988)

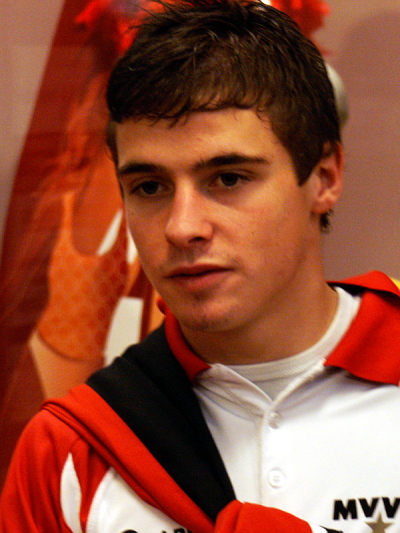
- Di Lallo with MVV in 2008

Personal information
- Date of birth: 14 September 1988 (age 38)
- Place of birth: Huy, Belgium
- Position: Winger

Team information
- Current team: Jemappes (sporting director)

Youth career
- –2006: Genk

Senior career*
Years	Team	Apps	(Gls)
2006–2009	MVV	78	(8)
2009–2011	Fortuna Sittard	66	(6)
2011–2014	Roeselare	97	(29)
2014–2016	Antwerp	26	(1)
2016	→ La Louvière Centre (loan)	19	(6)
2016–2017	Sporting Hasselt	22	(2)
2017–2018	Rebecq		
2018–2020	Wanze/Bas-Oha		
2020	Jehay		
2020–2022	Union Rochefortoise		
2022–2023	Morlanwelz		
2023–2025	Tertre-Hautrage		
2025	Jemappes	2	(0)
Total		310+	(52+)

International career
2003	Belgium U15	3	(0)
2003–2004	Belgium U16	9	(2)
2004	Belgium U17	5	(0)
- * Club domestic league appearances and goals

Anthony Di Lallo (born 14 September 1988) is a Belgian former professional footballer who serves as sporting director of Belgian Provincial Leagues club Jemappes.

A forward, he began his professional career in the Netherlands with MVV and Fortuna Sittard before moving to Belgium, where he spent the peak years of his career in the Belgian Second Division with Roeselare and Antwerp. Following spells at a series of lower-division clubs, he joined Jemappes in 2025, but a serious injury early in the season ended his playing career and led to his appointment as the club's sporting director. Di Lallo is a former Belgium youth international.

== Club career ==
=== MVV ===
Di Lallo began his professional career in the Netherlands with Eerste Divisie club MVV, making his debut on 21 August 2006 as a 73rd-minute substitute for Damien Miceli in a 1–0 loss to Dordrecht. He scored his first professional goal in the following match, netting in a 6–1 away win over Eindhoven after coming on as a 66th-minute substitute for Aziz Moutawakil.

In January 2009, MVV suspended Di Lallo after he spat in the direction of head coach Fuat Çapa during a friendly against PSV. He was reinstated two months later.

=== Fortuna Sittard ===
On 17 July 2009, Di Lallo signed a two-year contract with Fortuna Sittard. He made his debut for the club as a starter in a 4–0 home defeat to Helmond Sport on the opening matchday of the 2009–10 season. He spent two seasons at Fortuna, scoring six goals in 68 appearances.

=== Roeselare ===
Di Lallo joined Belgian Second Division club Roeselare in the summer of 2011. He scored on his competitive debut for the club on 17 August 2011, converting a penalty in a 1–1 away draw against Boussu Dour Borinage on the opening matchday of the 2011–12 season. He had a productive season, scoring 14 goals in 34 appearances. Over three seasons with the club, he scored 29 goals in 97 appearances.

=== Antwerp ===
In June 2014, Di Lallo signed with league rivals Antwerp. He made his debut for the club on 2 August, starting in a 1–1 home draw against Seraing United. On 6 February 2015, he scored his first and only goal for The Great Old, converting a penalty in a 4–1 league loss to Eupen. While he was a regular in his first season at the club, he made only one appearance in the first half of the 2015–16 season following the appointment of head coach David Gevaert. As a result, he was loaned to Belgian Third Division club UR La Louvière Centre for six months in January 2016.

=== Later career ===
On 31 May 2016, Di Lallo signed a two-year contract with recently promoted third-tier club Sporting Hasselt in the Belgian First Amateur Division. He scored three goals in 24 appearances during his sole season at the club. He then spent the following years at various lower-division clubs, playing for Rebecq, Wanze/Bas-Oha, Jehay, Union Rochefortoise, and AS Morlanwelz.

In July 2023, Di Lallo joined Saint-Ghislain Tertre-Hautrage (USGTH), a club in the Belgian Provincial Leagues, and helped secure promotion to the Belgian Division 3 in his first season.

In July 2025, Di Lallo joined USC Jemappes in the Belgian Provincial Leagues. A serious injury sustained early in the 2025–26 season brought his playing career to a close; his final appearance came in August 2025. He subsequently took on the role of sporting director at the club, saying the position allowed him to "compensate for what I was unable to contribute as a player on the pitch."

== International career ==
Di Lallo is a former Belgium youth international, having represented his country at under-15, under-16, and under-17 levels.

== Personal life ==
Since 2019, Di Lallo has worked as human resources consultant for Tempo-Team, a Dutch employment agency, alongside his football career. In 2024, he also became a player mentor for the sports agency Quadrans, led by former MVV teammate Gunter Thiebaut.
