= Manuel Angiulli =

Belgian footballer (born 1995)

Personal information
- Full name: Manuel Charly Angiulli
- Date of birth: 26 June 1995 (age 31)
- Place of birth: Liège, Belgium
- Height: 1.83 m (6 ft 0 in)
- Position: Centre-back

Team information
- Current team: FC United Richelle
- Number: 26

Youth career
- Visé

Senior career*
Years	Team	Apps	(Gls)
2013–2014	Visé	14	(1)
2014–2015	Alemannia Aachen II	10	(0)
2015–2020	Virton	108	(3)
2020	Politehnica Iași	2	(0)
2021	MVV	10	(1)
2021–2022	Mouscron	20	(0)
2022–2023	La Louvière Centre	17	(0)
2025–	FC United Richelle	0	(0)
- * Club domestic league appearances and goals as of 19:01, 16 January 2026 (UTC)

Manuel Charly Angiulli (born 26 June 1995) is a Belgium professional footballer who plays as a centre back for FC United Richelle.

== Career ==
Angiulli started his career with Belgian second division side Visé.

In 2014, he signed for Alemannia Aachen II in the German fifth division.

In 2020, Angiulli signed for Romanian club Politehnica Iași, where he made 3 appearances and scored 0 goals. On 11 November 2020, he debuted for Politehnica Iași during a 1–0 win over CFR Cluj.

Before the second half of 2020–21, Angiulli signed for MVV in the Netherlands.

On 27 July 2021, he signed a two-year deal with Mouscron.
