= Stavros Glouftsis =

Greek footballer

Personal information
- Date of birth: 20 October 1981 (age 45)
- Place of birth: Etterbeek, Belgium
- Height: 1.85 m (6 ft 1 in)
- Position: Forward

Youth career
- Anderlecht

Senior career*
Years	Team	Apps	(Gls)
1999–2000	Tubize	0	(0)
2000–2001	Dender	1	(0)
2001–2002	Léopold		
2002–2003	Rhodienne-Verrewinkel	7	(3)
2003–2004	Tempo Overijse	13	(8)
2004–2006	KFCV Geel	41	(13)
2005–2006	RAAL La Louvière	4	(0)
2006–2007	Union SG	33	(9)
2007–2008	Royal Antwerp	27	(6)
2008–2009	KVC Willebroek-Meerhof	25	(11)
2009–2010	Rupel Boom	34	(27)
2010–2011	Royal Antwerp	27	(5)
2011–2012	Sint-Niklaas	33	(13)
2012–2014	Eendracht Aalst	52	(18)
2014–2018	Lokeren-Temse	119	(74)
2018–2019	FC Ganshoren		
2019–2021	ROFC Stockel		
2021–2022	SK Rapid Leest		
2022	Stade Everois RC		
Total		416	(187)
- * Club domestic league appearances and goals

Stavros Glouftsis (Greek: Σταύρος Γλουφτσής; born 20 October 1981) is a Belgian former professional footballer who plays as a forward. He has Greek descent.

== Career ==
He made his debut in Belgian football for A.F.C. Tubize in 1999 in Belgian Third Division, after which he moved on to a number of clubs (FC Dender, R. Léopold Uccle Forestoise, K.F.C. Rhodienne-Verrewinkel and Tempo Overijse). In 2004, he was snapped up by Verbroedering Geel and made an immediate impact with 10 goals in the Second Division.

After two years he moved to R.A.A. Louviéroise to play in the Belgian First Division. He could not break through and he moved on to R. Union Saint-Gilloise in 2006.

After an unsuccessful stint with Second Division club Royal Antwerp, he moved to Third Division club Willebroek-Meerhof. One year later he moved to K Rupel Boom FC.

Glouftsis was an important part of the team. He was a prolific striker by scoring 27 goals in 1 season.

After narrowly missing out on the Belgian Third Division title with K Rupel Boom FC in 2010, he went to America to go on trial with Major League Soccer team Chicago Fire. On 21 July 2010 Glouftsis signed for second time with Royal Antwerp FC.

After a disappointing season with Royal Antwerp FC, Stavros signed a contract with Belgian Second Division outfit KSK Sint-Niklaas., and after the relegation of the club he signed a 2-year deal with Belgian Second Division side Eendracht Aalst.

In August 2014, Glouftsis signed a new contract with Belgian Third Division side KSV Temse
