= Daan De Pever =

Belgian footballer

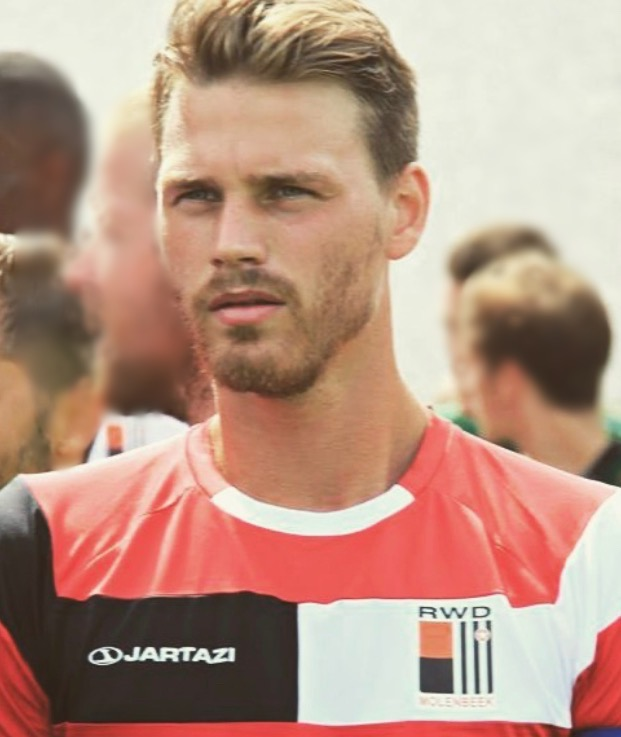

Personal information
- Date of birth: 17 January 1989 (age 37)
- Height: 1.73 m (5 ft 8 in)
- Position: Midfielder

Team information
- Current team: RWDM Brussels

Youth career
- FCV Dender EH

Senior career*
Years	Team	Apps	(Gls)
2007–2009	FCV Dender EH	30	(5)
2009–2011	KSV Roeselare	26	(0)
2011–2012	Standaard Wetteren	25	(3)
2012–2015	CS Visé	55	(4)
2015	FCV Dender EH	7	(1)
2015–	RWDM Brussels	7	(2)
- * Club domestic league appearances and goals as of 1 November 2015

Daan De Pever (born 17 January 1989) is a Belgian footballer who plays for RWDM Brussels.
