= David Habarugira =

Burundian footballer

Personal information
- Full name: David Habarugira
- Date of birth: 16 August 1988 (age 38)
- Place of birth: Bujumbura, Burundi
- Height: 1.85 m (6 ft 1 in)
- Position: Centre-back

Team information
- Current team: Léopold FC

Youth career
- 2002–2006: Anderlecht

Senior career*
| Years | Team | Apps | (Gls) |
| 2007–2009 | Anderlecht | 1 | (0) |
| 2007–2008 | → Saint-Gilloise (loan) | 24 | (0) |
| 2009–2010 | D.C. United | 0 | (0) |
| 2012–2014 | FC Brussels | 39 | (2) |
| 2014–2015 | Sint-Truiden | 22 | (0) |
| 2015–2017 | Lierse | 27 | (1) |
| 2017–2018 | Lierse II | | |
| 2018–2019 | Stade Lausanne | 3 | (0) |
| 2020– | Léopold FC | | |
| Total | | 116 | (3) |

International career
| 2008–2014 | Burundi | 9 | (1) |
- * Club domestic league appearances and goals as of 13:29, 3 January 2021 (UTC)

David Habarugira (born 16 August 1988 in Bujumbura) is a Burundian footballer who plays for Léopold FC.

== Career ==
=== Club ===
Habarugira grew up in Brussels, and began his career in 2002 playing in the youth system of storied Belgian club Anderlecht. He began his professional career in 2007 on loan to Union Saint-Gilloise, having been made being part of the team's EXQI League squad in the 2007–08 season. He played his first professional game on 22 September 2007 against Kortrijk.

Habarugira signed with Major League Soccer side D.C. United on 14 August 2009. He made appearances for the team in the CONCACAF Champions League. He was released by D.C. United on 20 January 2010.

=== International ===
Habarugira is a full international for the Burundi national football team. He made his first appearance for the team on 1 June 2008 in a 2010 FIFA World Cup qualifier against the Seychelles.

== Personal life ==
David's brother, Jean-Paul Habarugira, is also a professional soccer player, for Atlético Olympic and the national side.
