= Hemza Mihoubi =

Algerian-French footballer (born 1986)

Personal information
- Date of birth: 13 January 1986 (age 40)
- Place of birth: Oran, Algeria
- Height: 1.82 m (6 ft 0 in)
- Position: Defender

Team information
- Current team: FC Locarno
- Number: 6

Youth career
- 2002–2004: Metz

Senior career*
Years	Team	Apps	(Gls)
2004–2006	Metz	14	(0)
2006–2007	Lecce	7	(0)
2006–2007	→ Charleroi (loan)	11	(0)
2007–2009	Lecce	32	(0)
2009–2011	Bellinzona	27	(1)
2011–2012	Losone Sportiva	24	(0)
2012–2013	Wohlen	28	(0)
2013–2015	White Star Bruxelles	19	(0)
2016–	FC Locarno	3	(0)

International career
	Algeria U18	2	
2005	France U19	5	
- * Club domestic league appearances and goals as of 10 February 2017

Hemza Mihoubi (born 13 January 1986) is an Algerian-French footballer who currently plays for FC Locarno.

== Club career ==
Mihoubi started his professional career at FC Metz, where he came up through the club's youth system. After a season with the first team, he joined the Italian club U.S. Lecce. He was loaned out to Belgian club SC Charleroi, but failed to make an impact there and returned to US Lecce, where he now plays regular football. On 28 July 2009, AC Bellinzona signed the French-Algerian left-back from US Lecce on a two-year deal.

== International career ==
Mihoubi started his international career for the Algerian Under 18 team, earning two caps at this level. However, taking advantage of FIFA regulations, he switched allegiances and played for the French Under 19 team, where he got five caps. He played at 2005 UEFA European Under-19 Football Championship qualifying round. He is the first known Algerian player to make this switch, with most players doing the reverse.
