= Ioannis Masmanidis =

Greek-German footballer (born 1983)

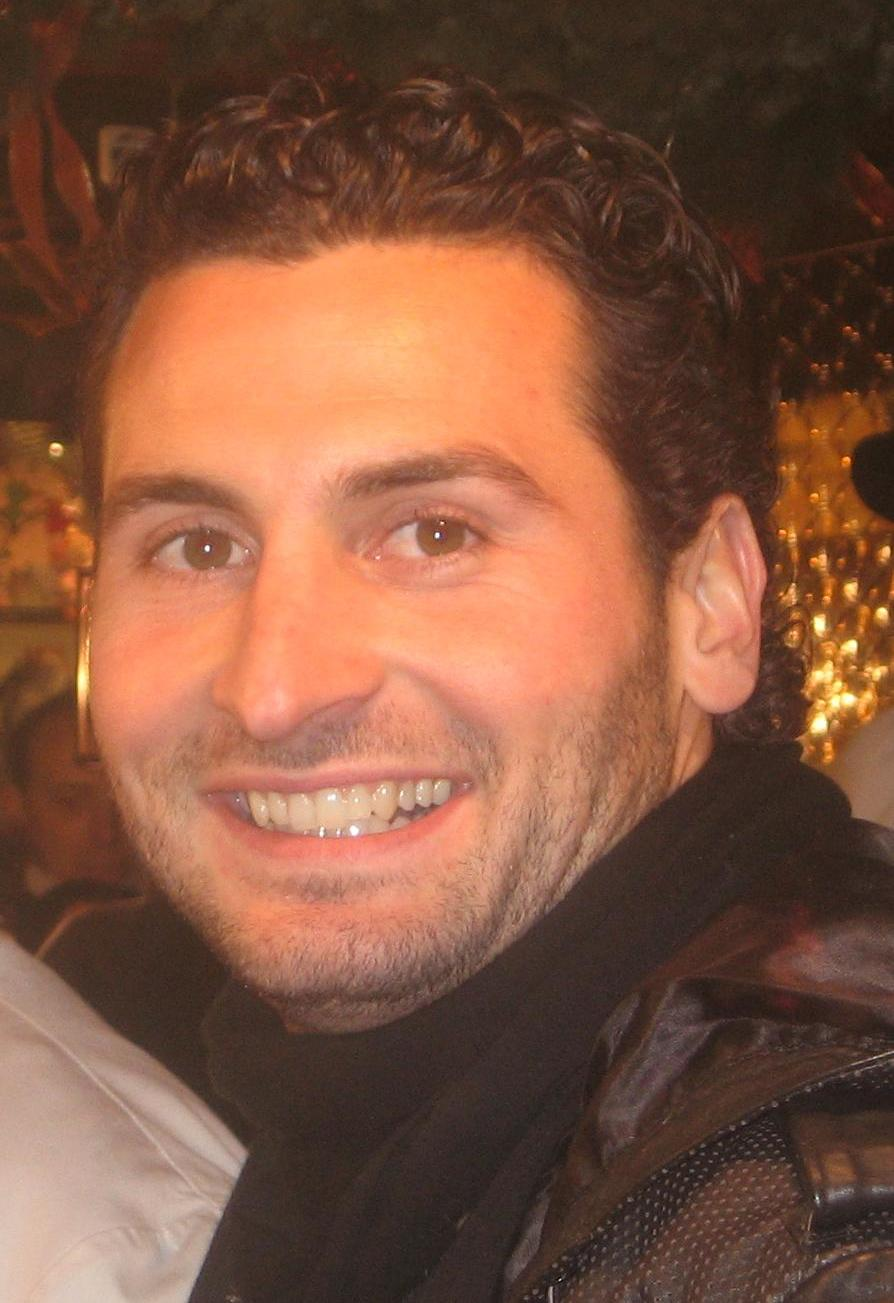
- Ioannis Masmanidis 2008

Personal information
- Date of birth: 9 March 1983 (age 43)
- Place of birth: Leverkusen, West Germany
- Height: 1.74 m (5 ft 8 1/2 in)
- Position: Midfielder

Youth career
- 1989–2001: Bayer 04 Leverkusen

Senior career*
Years	Team	Apps	(Gls)
2001–2004	Bayer 04 Leverkusen	14	(0)
2004–2006	Karlsruher SC	47	(9)
2006–2008	Arminia Bielefeld	46	(2)
2008	1. FC Nürnberg	9	(0)
2008–2010	Apollon Limassol	15	(4)
2010	Anorthosis Famagusta	6	(0)
2010–2011	Ethnikos Piraeus	6	(0)
2011	SV Wehen Wiesbaden	10	(0)
2011–2012	K.A.S. Eupen	29	(14)
2012–2014	Visé	38	(11)
2014–	VfL Wolfsburg II	8	(0)
- * Club domestic league appearances and goals as of 10:48, 14 March 2015 (UTC)

Ioannis Masmanidis (Greek: Γιάννης Μασμανίδης, born 9 March 1983) is a Greek-German retired footballer.

== Club career ==
He moved to Arminia Bielefeld during the winter transfer period 2005–06 from Karlsruher SC. He usually plays on the left side of attack or midfield. He also played for the German U-21 national team.

In July 2008, he moved to 1. FC Nürnberg, after six months he left the club and moved to Apollon Limassol on 6 January 2009. He left Apollon Limassol in summer 2010 and signed for Greek side Ethnikos Piraeus F.C. Masmanidis played in the first half of the 2010–11 season six games in the Beta Ethniki for Ethnikos and returned in January 2011 to his homeland Germany when he signed for SV Wehen Wiesbaden.

In the summer of 2011, he joined Belgian Second Division side K.A.S. Eupen on a free transfer. After a year he moved on to fellow leaguer Visé, where he stayed another two years.

In August 2014, he returned to Germany and signed for VfL Wolfsburg II of fourth tier Regionalliga Nord on a one-year deal.

== National team ==
He represented the German under-20 team at the 2003 FIFA World Youth Championship and the under-21 team at European under-21 championship 2006.
