= Egon Wisniowski =

Belgian footballer

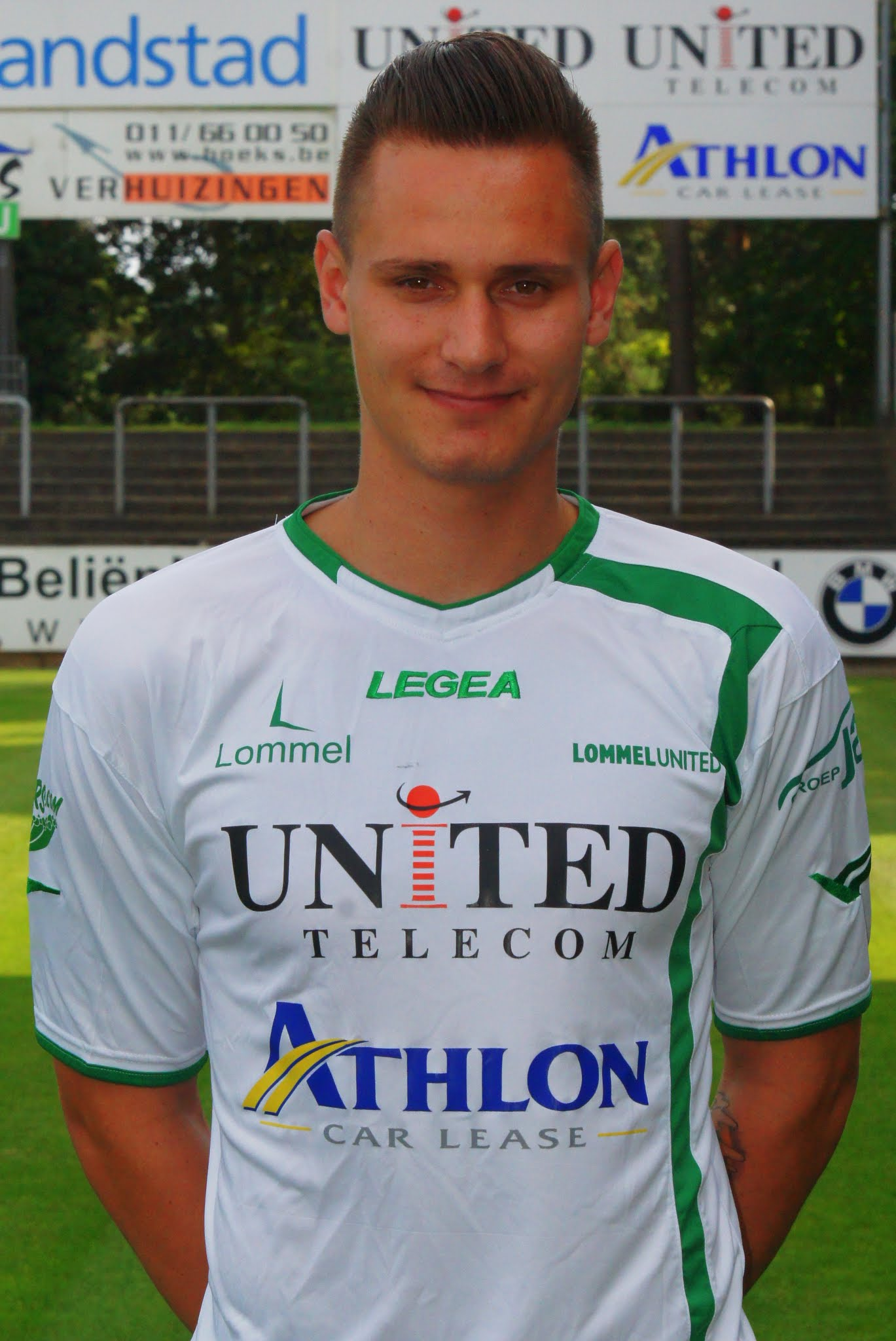
- Wisniowski with Lommel

Personal information
- Date of birth: 19 February 1985 (age 41)
- Place of birth: Belgium
- Height: 1.91 m (6 ft 3 in)
- Position: Defender

Senior career*
| Years | Team | Apps | (Gls) |
| –2008 | STVV | 65 | (3) |
| 2008–2009 | Progresul Bucureşti | | (3) |
| 2009–2011 | Visé | 23+ | (2+) |
| 2011–2013 | Lommel | 50 | (2) |
| | Sporting Hasselt | 16 | (1) |
- SK Herkenrode
- * Club domestic league appearances and goals

Egon Wisniowski (born 19 February 1985) is a Belgian former professional footballer who played as a defender.

== Career ==
In 2008, Wisniowski signed for Romanian second division side Progresul Bucureşti from STVV in the Belgian top flight, where he was injured.

In 2013, he signed for Belgian fourth division club Sporting Hasselt from Lommel in the Belgian second division, before joining Belgian eighth division team SK Herkenrode.
