= Tom Raes =

Belgian footballer

Personal information
- Full name: Tom Raes
- Date of birth: 8 January 1988 (age 38)
- Place of birth: Roeselare, Belgium
- Height: 1.90 m (6 ft 3 in)
- Position: Centre-back

Team information
- Current team: SK Westrozebeke
- Number: 15

Youth career
- –2006: KSV Roeselare

Senior career*
| Years | Team | Apps | (Gls) |
| 2006–2008 | KSV Roeselare | 2 | (0) |
| 2008–2014 | KSV Oudenaarde | 33 | (5) |
| 2014–2017 | KSV Roeselare | 60 | (5) |
| 2017 | → KFC VW Hamme (loan) | 13 | (1) |
| 2017– | Mandel United | | |
- * Club domestic league appearances and goals as of 7 December 2016 (UTC)

Tom Raes (born 8 January 1988) is a Belgian footballer who currently plays for SK Westrozebeke as a centre-back.
