= Luigi Vaccaro =

Belgian footballer

Personal information
- Date of birth: 26 March 1991 (age 35)
- Place of birth: Liège, Belgium
- Height: 1.83 m (6 ft 0 in)
- Position: Midfielder

Team information
- Current team: Union Hutoise
- Number: 66

Youth career
- Standard Liège
- Sporting Charleroi

Senior career*
Years	Team	Apps	(Gls)
2011–2013	Eupen	34	(1)
2013–2014	Visé	26	(2)
2014–2015	Seraing United	20	(1)
2015–2016	Mouscron	19	(2)
2017–2018	Virton	27	(2)
2019–2020	URSL Visé	14	(1)
2020–2023	Wiltz 71	66	(7)
2023–2024	Stade Verviétois	22	(1)
2024–	Union Hutoise	24	(1)
- * Club domestic league appearances and goals as of 11:01, 21 January 2026 (UTC)

Luigi Vaccaro (born 26 March 1991) is a Belgian professional footballer who plays as a midfielder for Union Hutoise.
