= Kevin Geudens =

Belgian footballer (born 1980)

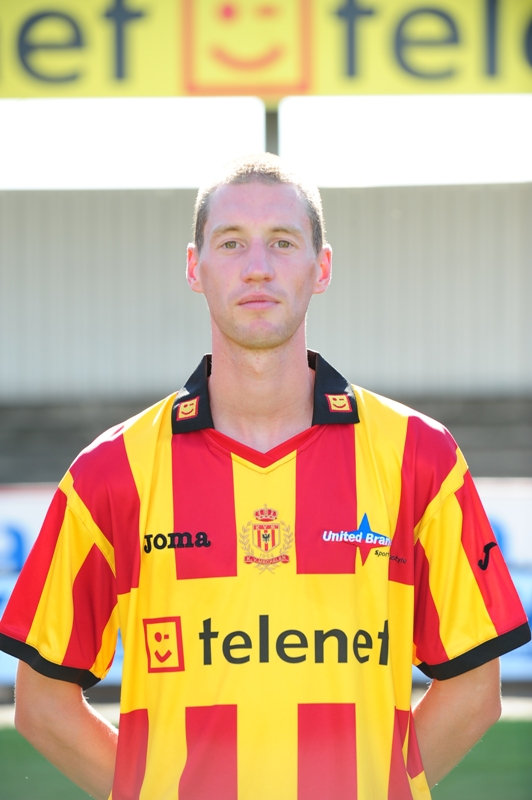

Personal information
- Date of birth: 2 December 1980 (age 45)
- Place of birth: Geel, Belgium
- Height: 1.85 m (6 ft 1 in)
- Position: Defensive midfielder

Team information
- Current team: Beerschot Wilrijk
- Number: 8

Senior career*
Years	Team	Apps	(Gls)
2001–2003	Meerhout	54	(6)
2003–2005	Dessel Sport	59	(8)
2005–2006	Geel	24	(2)
2006–2012	KV Mechelen	98	(9)
2012–2015	Westerlo	94	(9)
2015–	Beerschot Wilrijk	7	(1)
- * Club domestic league appearances and goals as of 22 November 2015

Kevin Geudens (born 2 December 1980 in Geel, Belgium) is a Belgian football midfielder. He currently plays for Beerschot Wilrijk in the Belgian Third Division.
