= Hervé Ndjana Onana =

Cameroonian footballer

Hervé Onana
Personal information
- Full name: Hervé Anselme Ndjana Onana
- Date of birth: 1 June 1986 (age 40)
- Place of birth: Yaoundé, Cameroon
- Height: 1.68 m (5 ft 6 in)
- Position: Forward

Team information
- Current team: Mariekerke

Youth career
- 1990–2003: Foudre d'Akonolinga

Senior career*
Years	Team	Apps	(Gls)
2003–2007	Foudre d'Akonolinga	38	(18)
2007–2009	Red Star Waasland	69	(38)
2009–2012	Sint-Truiden	35	(2)
2011	→ Enosis Neon Paralimni (loan)	7	(2)
2011–2012	→ Waasland-Beveren (loan)	38	(15)
2012–2014	Tubize	48	(20)
2014–2015	Sint-Eloois-Winkel		
2015–2017	Union SG	7	(0)
2016	→ La Louvière Centre (loan)		
2016–2017	→ Bornem (loan)		
2017–	Mariekerke		
- * Club domestic league appearances and goals as of 08:59, 29 December 2020 (UTC)

Hervé Anselme Ndjana Onana (born 1 June 1986) is a Cameroonian footballer who plays as a striker for Belgian club FC Mariekerke.

== Career ==
Onana began his career with Foudre d’Akonolinga and moved in summer 2007 to Red Star Waasland. In his second season at the club, he became top goalscorer of the Belgian Second Division with 26 goals. He left the club on 17 June 2009, to sign for Belgian Pro League club Sint-Truiden. After two seasons with Sint-Truiden, he was loaned out twice, first to Enosis Neon Paralimni in Cyprus and then to Waasland-Beveren in Belgium, the successor team of Red Star Waasland. At Waasland-Beveren, he was part of the team that managed promotion to the Belgian Pro League during the 2011–12 season. However that same season Sint-Truiden made the opposite move as the team relegated to the Belgian Second Division and as he result, upon return from Waasland-Beveren he was allowed to leave. Onana then signed for Tubize. There, he became league top goalscorer of the Belgian Second Division in his first season with 17 goals; his second top scorer title of the division. but was unable to repeat his strong performances in the following season. Onana subsequently played for Sint-Eloois-Winkel Sport, Union Saint-Gillouse, La Louvière Centre, KSV Bornem and FC Mariekerke.

== International career ==
Onana's first call up for the Cameroon national football team was on 15 February 2009 for a trial camp in Paris.
