= Geoffrey Cabeke =

Belgian footballer

Personal information
- Full name: Geoffrey Cabeke
- Date of birth: 5 November 1988 (age 38)
- Place of birth: Belgium
- Height: 1.75 m (5 ft 9 in)
- Position: Left wing back

Team information
- Current team: RWDM47

Youth career
- FC Brussels

Senior career*
Years	Team	Apps	(Gls)
2007–2010	FC Brussels	39	(4)
2010–2012	Westerlo	23	(0)
2012–2014	Brussels	48	(2)
2014–2017	Union SG	80	(4)
2017–	RWDM47	0	(0)
- * Club domestic league appearances and goals as of 22 September 2017

Geoffrey Cabeke (born 5 November 1988) is a Belgian defender, who currently plays for RWDM47.
