= Jonas Vandermarliere =

Belgian footballer

Personal information
- Full name: Jonas Vandermarliere
- Date of birth: 7 March 1986 (age 40)
- Place of birth: Poperinge, Belgium
- Height: 1.75 m (5 ft 9 in)
- Position: Midfielder

Youth career
- 1993–1996: KFC Poperinge
- 1996–2003: Anderlecht

Senior career*
Years	Team	Apps	(Gls)
2003–2005	Anderlecht	0	(0)
2004–2005	→ Union SG (loan)	0	(0)
2006–2009	Zulte-Waregem	26	(0)
2007	→ Hamme (loan)	12	(0)
2008–2009	Hamme	34	(2)
2009–2010	KSV Temse	21	(1)
2010–2011	FC Brussels	25	(1)
2011–2013	SK Sint-Niklaas	62	(11)
2013–2015	Heist	65	(8)
2015–2017	OMS Ingelmunster		
2017–2020	KVK Westhoek	24	(6)
2020–2024	Sassport Boezinge	75	(6)

Managerial career
- 2022: Sassport Boezinge (caretaker)
- * Club domestic league appearances and goals

Jonas Vandermarliere (born 7 March 1986 in Poperinge) is a Belgian footballer.

== Career ==
He started his football career in his home town of Poperinge with K.F.C. Poperinge but from his tenth year on he played for R.S.C. Anderlecht. After spending 10 years at the Anderlecht youth team, Zulte-Waregem signed him to let him play in the first team. He is most known for scoring the all-important away goal in the 94th minute against FC Lokomotiv Moscow in the UEFA Cup 2006-07.
