= Guy Blaise =

Luxembourgish footballer

Personal information
- Date of birth: 12 December 1980 (age 45)
- Place of birth: Aubange, Belgium
- Height: 1.84 m (6 ft 0 in)
- Position: Centre-back

Team information
- Current team: RUS Martelange

Senior career*
| Years | Team | Apps | (Gls) |
| 2000–2016 | Virton | 334 | (6) |
| 2016–2018 | RRC Longlier | 46 | (1) |
| 2018–2025 | ROC Meix-devant-Virton | 106 | (8) |
| 2025– | RUS Martelange | | |

International career
| 2009–2013 | Luxembourg | 30 | (0) |
- * Club domestic league appearances and goals as of 19:34, 30 October 2026 (UTC)

Guy Blaise (born 12 December 1980) is a footballer who played as a centre-back for RUS Martelange. Born in Belgium, he represented the Luxembourg national team.

== Club career ==
Blaise began his career as a forward, but later changed to a defender by Michel Le Flochmoan, who gave him his with Virton in 2000. In 2012, despite interest from several clubs in Luxembourg, he chose to extend his contract with Vitron. Later that year, he made his 300th appearance for the club. In April 2016, it was announced that he would join RRC Longlier at the end of the season.

In 2018, he signed for ROC Meix-devant-Virton, and by 2023, was the oldest player in the Belgian Division 3. In 2025, he joined RUS Martelange.

== International career ==
Blaise made his debut for the Luxembourg national team on 12 August 2009, in a 1–0 defeat to Lithuania. Between 2009 and 2013, Blaise made 30 appearances for Luxembourg. His last appearance for Luxembourg came in a 1–1 draw with Armenia on 5 February 2013, before retiring from international football in November after being dropped by manager Luc Holtz.

== Personal life ==
Born in Belgium, his wife is from Luxembourg, allowing him to become a naturalized citizen in August 2009.
