= Raphaël Lecomte =

French footballer (born 1988)

Personal information
- Date of birth: 22 May 1988 (age 38)
- Place of birth: Guingamp, France
- Height: 1.79 m (5 ft 10 in)
- Position: Midfielder

Team information
- Current team: RSC Habay-la-Neuve

Youth career
- Saint-Étienne
- Real Zaragoza

Senior career*
| Years | Team | Apps | (Gls) |
| 2009 | Navalcarnero | 14 | (1) |
| 2009–2013 | Visé | 96 | (29) |
| 2013–2016 | Westerlo | 69 | (8) |
| 2016–2018 | Roeselare | 67 | (7) |
| 2018–2020 | Virton | 62 | (7) |
| 2020–2022 | Deinze | 50 | (2) |
| 2022– | RSC Habay-la-Neuve | 0 | (0) |
- * Club domestic league appearances and goals as of 19 August 2022

Raphaël Lecomte (born 22 May 1988) is a French footballer who plays as a midfielder for Belgian fifth-tier Belgian Division 3 club RSC Habay-la-Neuve.

== Career ==
Lecomte started his career with Navalcarnero in the Spanish third division after playing for the youth academy of French Ligue 1 side Saint-Étienne.

In 2009, he signed for Belgian third division club Visé, but left due to financial problems.

In 2013, Lecomte signed for Westerlo in the Belgian second division, where he made 75 appearances and scored 8 goals.

In 2018, he signed for Belgian third division team Virton.
