= Gary Ambroise =

French-Haitian footballer (born 1985)

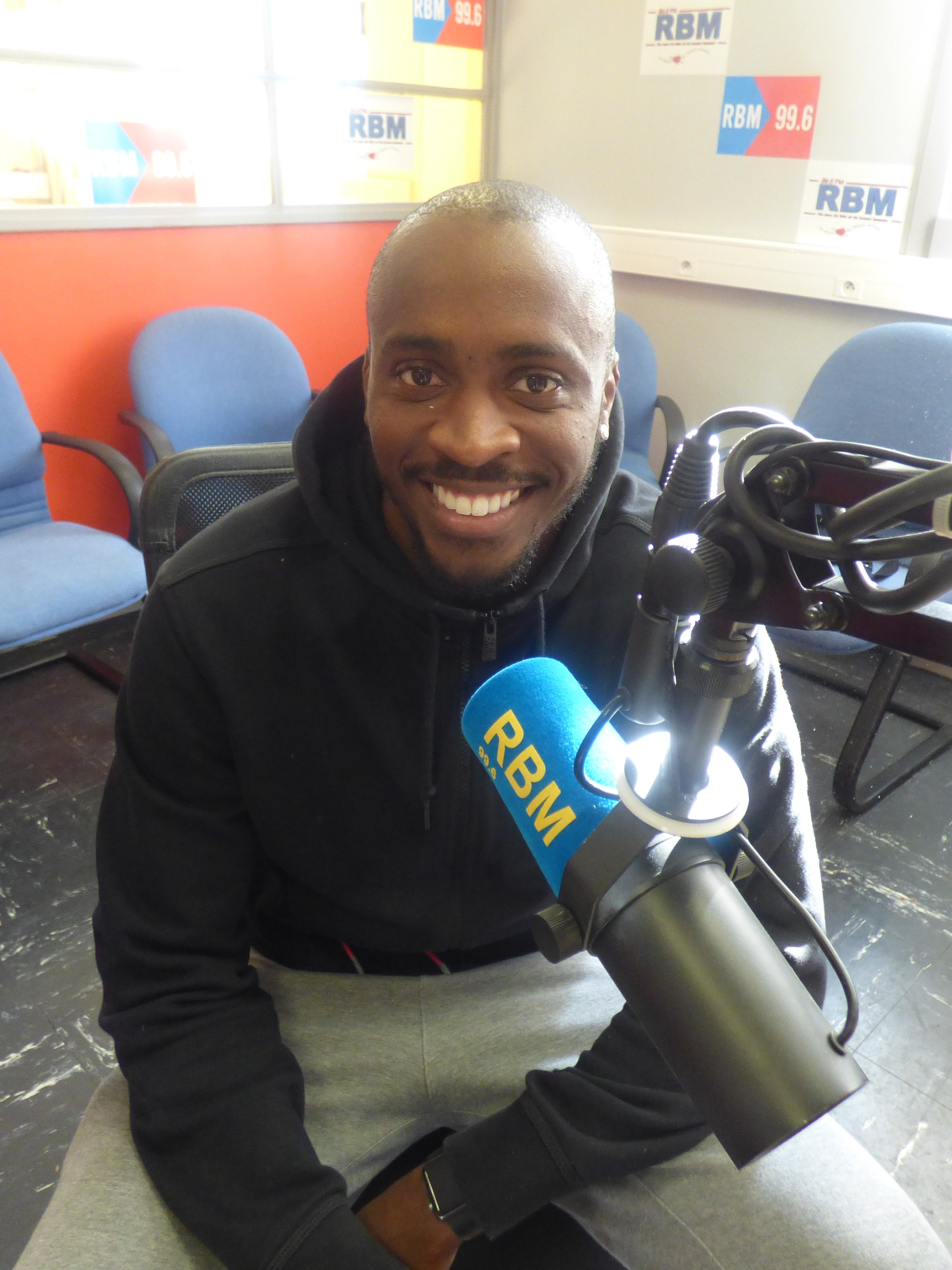
- Ambroise at RBM studios, in Billy-Montigny (Pas-de-Calais)

Personal information
- Date of birth: 17 July 1985 (age 41)
- Place of birth: Paris, France
- Position: Striker

Team information
- Current team: White Star Bruxelles
- Number: 7

Senior career*
| Years | Team | Apps | (Gls) |
| 2005–2008 | FC Les Lilas | | |
| 2008–2010 | US Roye-Noyon | 28 | (5) |
| 2010–2014 | Tubize | 123 | (27) |
| 2014–2015 | Doxa Katokopias | 9 | (0) |
| 2015– | White Star Bruxelles | 9 | (2) |

International career^{‡}
| 2011– | Haiti | 3 | (0) |
- * Club domestic league appearances and goals as of 26 July 2015 ‡ National team caps and goals as of 23 June 2014

Gary Ambroise (born 17 July 1985) is a professional footballer who plays for Belgian club White Star Bruxelles, as a striker.

Born in France, he represents Haiti at international level.

== Career ==
Ambroise has played in France for FC Les Lilas and US Roye-Noyon, and in Belgium for Tubize.

He made his international debut for Haiti in 2011, and has appeared in FIFA World Cup qualifying matches.
