= Gideon Boateng =

Ghanaian footballer (born 1991)

Personal information
- Full name: Gideon Acheampong Boateng
- Date of birth: 26 August 1991 (age 35)
- Place of birth: Accra, Ghana
- Height: 1.84 m (6 ft 0 in)
- Position: Striker

Youth career
- 2001–2004: Tubantia Borgerhout
- 2004–2005: Royal Antwerp
- 2005–2006: Lierse
- 2006–2007: Anderlecht

Senior career*
Years	Team	Apps	(Gls)
2007–2008	Anderlecht	0	(0)
2009–2012	MVV	73	(12)
2012–2013	Visé	27	(6)
2013	ASV Geel	11	(2)
2014–2016	Bilzen-Waltwilder		

International career
2006	Belgium U15	6	(1)
2006	Belgium U16	1	(0)
- * Club domestic league appearances and goals

Gideon Acheampong Boateng (born 26 August 1991) is a Ghanaian former professional footballer who played as a striker.

== Career ==
Boateng was born in Accra, Ghana, and moved to Belgium in 2000, later obtaining Belgian citizenship. He began playing football at Tubantia Borgerhout before joining Antwerp and then Lierse. Known for his speed, he was often deployed as a direct attacking threat. Seeking to develop his technical skills, he later joined Anderlecht in 2006.

After three years at Anderlecht, Boateng signed a three-and-a-half-year contract with Dutch Eerste Divisie club MVV Maastricht on 15 December 2008. Boateng became part of MVV's first-team rotation during his first seasons in Maastricht. In the 2008–09 Eerste Divisie season, he made 20 league appearances, including eight starts, and scored five goals. The following season he appeared in 34 league matches, starting 21, and recorded five goals and five assists. In January 2012, Boateng returned to Belgium where he joined CS Visé. In 2013, he moved to ASV Geel. He then played some time for Bilzen-Waltwilder, where he picked off interest from Lokeren in March 2015.
