= Toon Lenaerts =

Belgian footballer

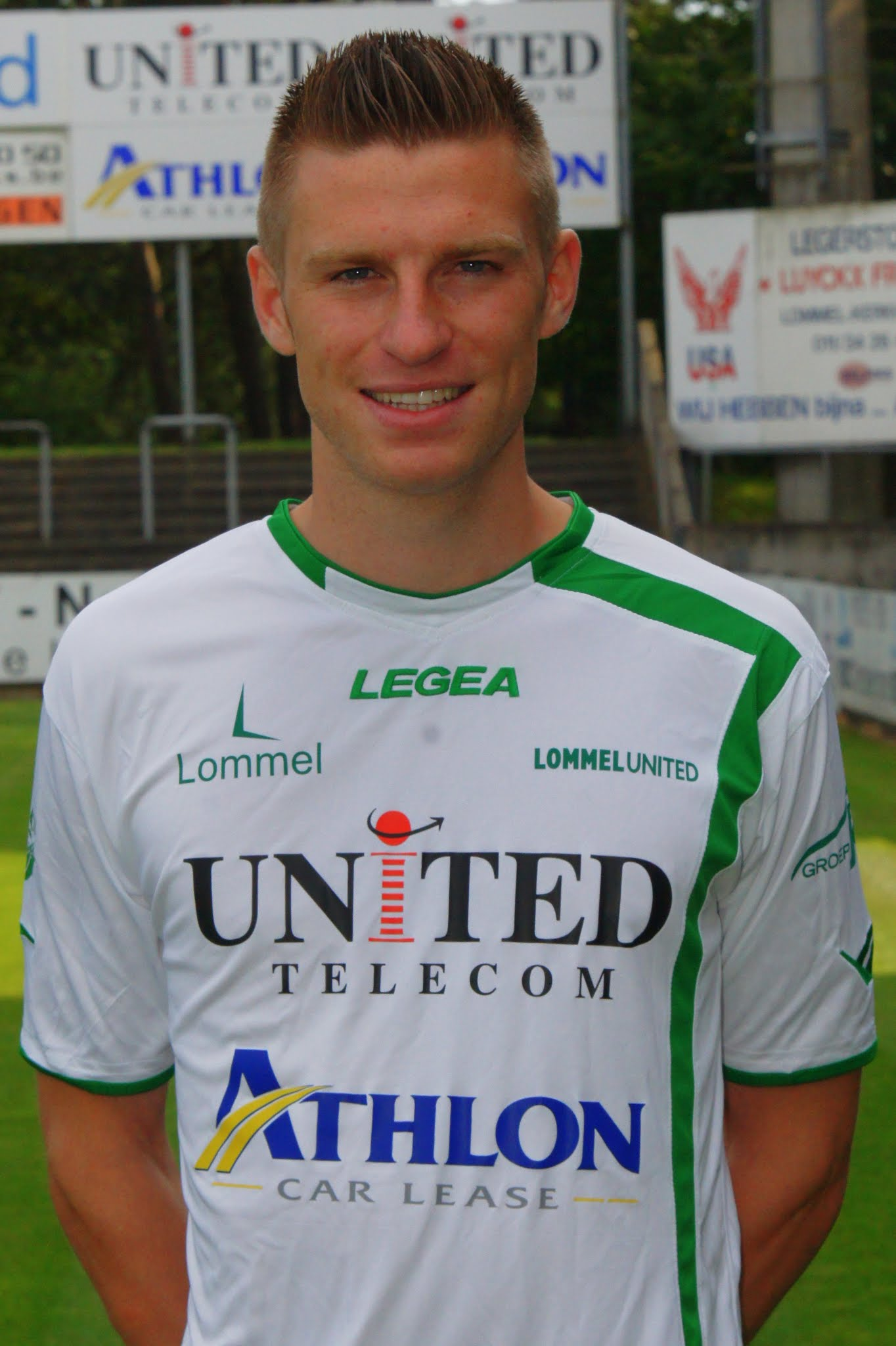

Personal information
- Date of birth: 16 July 1990 (age 36)
- Place of birth: Belgium
- Height: 1.86 m (6 ft 1 in)
- Position: Centre-back

Team information
- Current team: Bocholt VV
- Number: 4

Youth career
- –2008: Lommel

Senior career*
Years	Team	Apps	(Gls)
2008–2017	Lommel	231	(13)
2017–2022	Dessel Sport	108	(6)
2022–	Bocholt VV	86	(9)
- * Club domestic league appearances and goals as of 25 January 2026

Toon Lenaerts (born 16 July 1990) is a Belgian footballer who plays as a centre back for Bocholt VV.
