= Ratko Vansimpsen =

Belgian footballer

Personal information
- Date of birth: 16 July 1989 (age 37)
- Place of birth: Sint-Truiden, Belgium
- Height: 1.87 m (6 ft 1 1/2 in)
- Position: Striker

Team information
- Current team: Dessel Sport
- Number: 9

Youth career
- Sint-Truiden
- 2005–2010: Willem II

Senior career*
Years	Team	Apps	(Gls)
2010–2012	FC Eindhoven	46	(12)
2012–2014	Dessel Sport	51	(14)
2014–2015	Eendracht Aalst	34	(11)
2015–2016	Beerschot Wilrijk	30	(8)
2016–	Dessel Sport		
- * Club domestic league appearances and goals as of 21:15, 19 May 2016 (UTC)

Ratko Vansimpsen (born 16 July 1989) is a Belgian professional footballer who plays for Dessel Sport, as a striker.

== Early and personal life ==
Vansimpsen was born in Sint-Truiden, Belgium. He was named after Serbian goalkeeper Ratko Svilar. He is half-Dutch, and from the age of 16 lived in Tilburg in the Netherlands. His wife is Dutch and he speaks with a Dutch accent. When not playing football, Vansimpsen cares for his young daughter.

== Career ==
Vansimpsen played youth football with Sint-Truiden and Willem II.

Vansimpsen has played professionally with FC Eindhoven, Dessel Sport, Eendracht Aalst and Beerschot Wilrijk.

He was top scorer (with 10 goals) during his first season with FC Eindhoven, but his second season was interrupted by injury. He was also the top scorer (again with 10 goals) during his first season with Dessel Sport, although his second season was also marred by injury problems.

He moved from Dessel Sport to Eendracht Aalst in May 2014, after rejecting a new contract offer from his former club.

He returned to Dessel Sport in May 2016.
