= Mathias Schamp =

Belgian footballer

Personal information
- Full name: Mathias Schamp
- Date of birth: 18 June 1988 (age 38)
- Place of birth: Zottegem, Belgium
- Height: 1.78 m (5 ft 10 in)
- Positions: Striker; left winger

Team information
- Current team: KVK Ninove

Youth career
- –2008: Lokeren

Senior career*
Years	Team	Apps	(Gls)
2008–2009	Lokeren	0	(0)
2008–2009	→ Oudenaarde (loan)	1	(0)
2009–2013	Oudenaarde	81	(21)
2013	Heracles Almelo	5	(0)
2013–2014	Oudenaarde	26	(5)
2014–2016	Deinze	35	(9)
2015–2016	→ Sint-Eloois-Winkel (loan)	16	(3)
2016	Deinze		
2016–2017	FC Pepingen		
2017–	KVK Ninove		
- * Club domestic league appearances and goals as of 2 January 2016

Mathias Schamp is a Belgian footballer who plays as a striker or left winger for Sint-Eloois-Winkel.
