= Benjamin Delacourt =

French footballer (born 1985)

Personal information
- Date of birth: 10 September 1985 (age 41)
- Place of birth: Croix, Nord, France
- Height: 1.77 m (5 ft 10 in)
- Position: Centre back

Team information
- Current team: RWDM

Senior career*
Years	Team	Apps	(Gls)
2004–2006	Mouscron	1	(0)
2006–2011	ES Wasquehal		
2011–2015	Royal Mouscron	100	(10)
2015–2017	KMSK Deinze	35	(1)
2017–2019	Cercle Brugge	34	(2)
2019–	RWDM	0	(0)
- * Club domestic league appearances and goals as of 13:07, 5 July 2019 (UTC)

Benjamin Delacourt (born 10 September 1985) is a French footballer who plays for R.W.D. Molenbeek.

== Career ==
Ahead of the 2019/20 season, Delacourt joined R.W.D. Molenbeek.
