= Glenn Neven =

Belgian footballer

Glenn Nevens
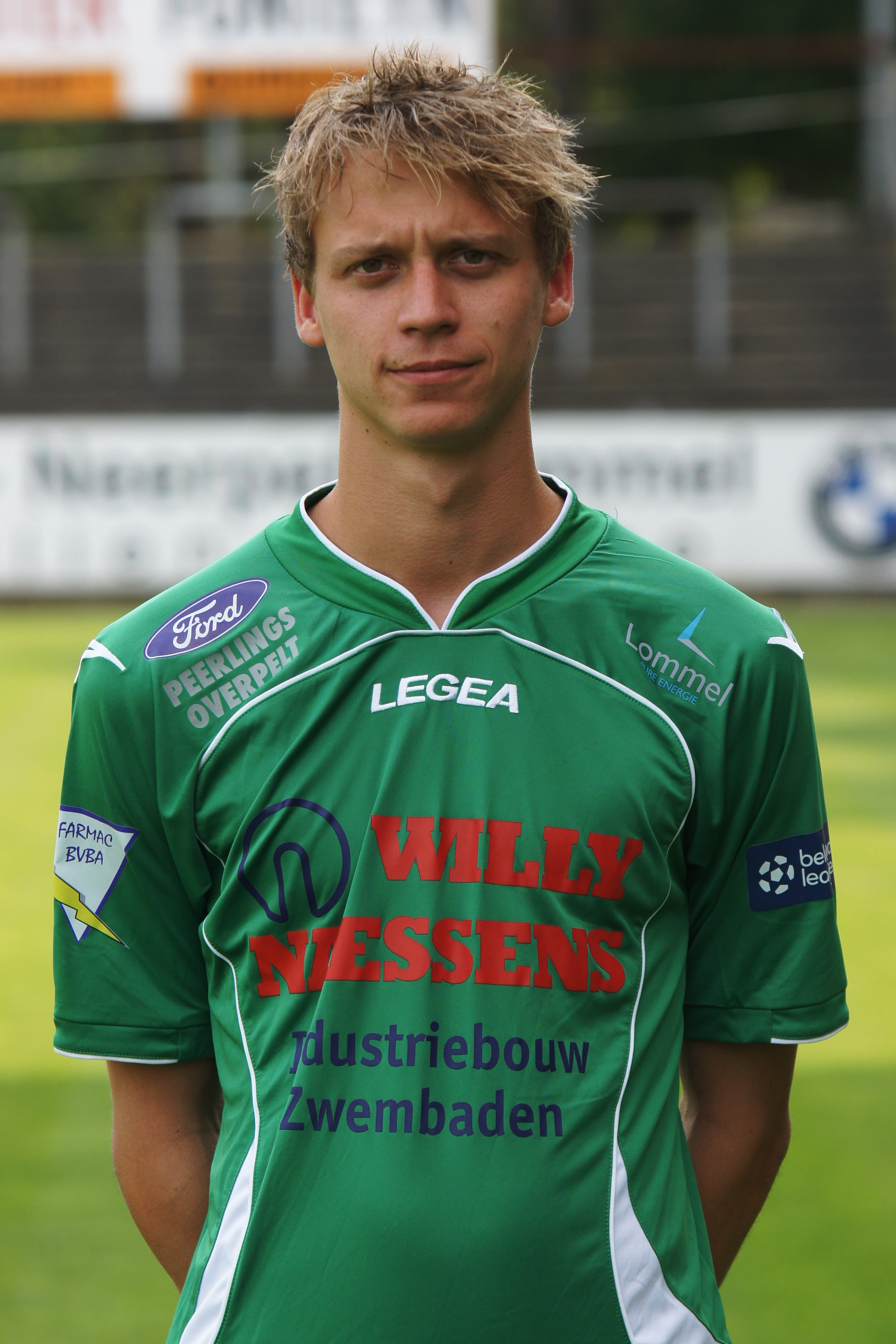

Personal information
- Date of birth: 8 February 1990 (age 36)
- Place of birth: Tongeren, Belgium
- Height: 1.83 m (6 ft 0 in)
- Position: Centre-back

Team information
- Current team: Eendracht Termien
- Number: 24

Youth career
- –2009: Tienen

Senior career*
Years	Team	Apps	(Gls)
2009–2012	Tienen	92	(2)
2012–2013	Heist	27	(2)
2013–2024	Lommel	256	(22)
2024–	Eendracht Termien	42	(4)
- * Club domestic league appearances and goals as of 7 December 2025

Glenn Nevens (born 8 February 1990) is a Belgian footballer who plays as a centre-back, and occasionally as a defensive midfielder or right-back, for Belgian Division 2 club Eendracht Termien.

== Club career ==
Nevens is under contract through June 2026 with Eendracht Termien, after joining from Lommel.
