= Simon Vermeiren =

Belgian footballer

Personal information
- Date of birth: 22 December 1990 (age 35)
- Place of birth: Leuven, Belgium
- Height: 1.85 m (6 ft 1 in)
- Position: Forward

Team information
- Current team: Lokeren-Temse (assistant)

Youth career
- Kessel-Lo
- Sint-Truiden
- Westerlo
- –2009: Mechelen

Senior career*
Years	Team	Apps	(Gls)
2009–2012	OH Leuven	16	(3)
2011–2012	→ Wijgmaal (loan)	21	(5)
2012–2015	Heist	61	(13)
2015–2016	Oosterzonen Oosterwijk	31	(24)
2016–2017	Beerschot-Wilrijk	32	(12)
2017–2018	Lommel	25	(5)
2018–2021	Lierse Kempenzonen	64	(23)
2021–2024	Lokeren-Temse	28	(9)

Managerial career
- 2024–: Lokeren-Temse (assistant)
- * Club domestic league appearances and goals as of 28 August 2024

Simon Vermeiren (born 22 December 1990) is a Belgian former professional footballer and currently assistant manager of Lokeren-Temse.
