= Bram Vandenbussche =

Belgian footballer

Personal information
- Full name: Bram André Vandenbussche
- Date of birth: 1 February 1981 (age 45)
- Place of birth: Bruges, Belgium
- Height: 1.84 m (6 ft 0 in)
- Position: Centre-back

Youth career
- 1987–2000: Cercle Brugge

Senior career*
Years	Team	Apps	(Gls)
2000–2009	Cercle Brugge	195	(14)
2009–2014	SV Roeselare	137	(10)
2014–2020	SVV Damme		
2020–2022	SK Eernegem		
- * Club domestic league appearances and goals

Bram Vandenbussche (born 1 February 1981 in Bruges) is a retired Belgian professional footballer.

He usually plays as central defender, although he is sometimes fielded as defensive midfielder in times of need. His heading is his strongest point.

== Career ==
Vandenbussche started his career at Cercle Brugge, where he made his first team debut on 17 December 2000, in a 1–2 home loss against Maasland. His last match was against SV Roeselare, his new team. Cercle won 1–2.

In 2002, Bram Vandenbussche won the Cercle Brugge Pop Poll.

In the 2005-2006 season, Vandenbussche startled the Belgian football competition when he failed a doping test. Traces of corticosteroids were found. Luckily for Vandenbussche, he could prove that he had suffered from his back. The Cercle Brugge medical staff had given him an injection for this, so they also took responsibility for Vandenbussche's positive doping test.

After becoming a back-up player for Cercle, Bram Vandenbussche signed a contract for 3 years with SV Roeselare. He will meet his former coach Dennis Van Wijk there. Vandenbussche played more than 22 years for the green and black side.

== Trivia ==
- Bram Vandenbussche holds an academic degree of physical education.
- His father has a bakery in Assebroek, a municipality of Bruges.
