= RWDM Brussels FC =

R.W.D.M. Brussels
- Full name: Racing White Daring Molenbeek Brussels Football Club
- Nickname: Les Coalisés (The United)
- Founded: 1932
- Dissolved: 2014
- Ground: Stade Edmond Machtens, Molenbeek
- Capacity: 11,266
- Final season; 2013–14: 8th in Belgian Second Division (dissolved)
Home colours	Away colours

Racing White Daring Molenbeek Brussels Football Club, often simply referred to as RWDM Brussels, F.C. Brussels or simply Brussels, was a Belgian professional association football club based in the municipality of Molenbeek, in the Brussels Capital-Region. They last played in the second division during the 2013–14 season where they finished 8th, but folded at the end of the season due to financial trouble. The club was a continuation of FC Strombeek, a club from the Brussels suburb of Strombeek-Bever with matricule №1936 which was formed in 1932. However, Strombeek moved to Molenbeek to replace defunct Racing White Daring Molenbeek (RWDM) there. FC Brussels played at the Stade Edmond Machtens, Molenbeek's former stadium. Their highest league ranking was a 10th place in the first division in 2005–06.

== History ==
F.C. Strombeek first registered at the Royal Belgian Football Association in 1932. After many seasons played at the lower levels of Belgian football, Strombeek first reached the third division by winning the Promotion D – Belgium's 4th highest level of football – in 1995–96. After three seasons at that level, they won the third division A in 1999–2000, gaining promotion to the second division for the first time in their history. They finished at the 10th place in the second division in 2000–01. The next season, Strombeek finished at the 9th place. At the same time, the club of R.W.D. Molenbeek, though ranked 10th in the first division, were refused their professional license, and were subsequently relegated to the third division, struggling with financial problems.

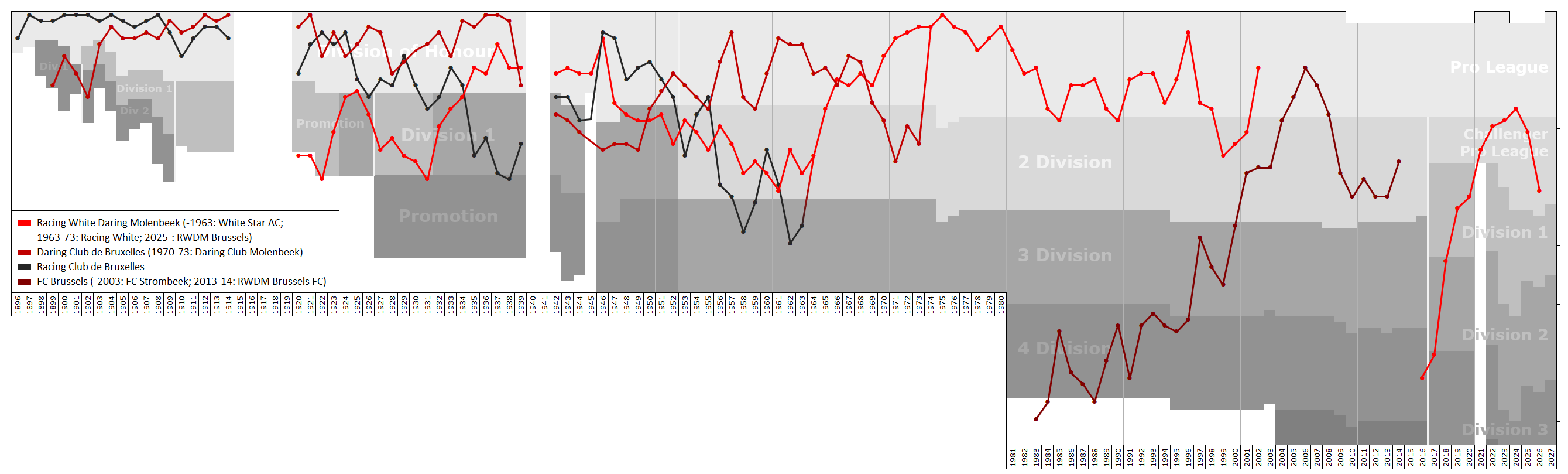
Historical league performance chart of FC Brussels and its predecessors

Johan Vermeersch decicided to create another club by moving KFC Strombeek from the Singelstadion, their stadium in Grimbergen, to Molenbeek's stadium, the Stade Edmond Machtens. KFC Strombeek finished at the 9th place again in the second division in the 2002–03 season. Only 2 players from Strombeek remaining at the club, and the new club was named FC Molenbeek Brussels Strombeek, with the aim to promote to the first division the next season.

In April 2014, the club announced to change the name again. Effectively at the start of 2013–14 season, the club would known as R.W.D.M. Brussels F.C.. The club ultimately folded at the end of that season.

They had won the 2003–04 Belgian Second Division.

== Honours ==
- Belgian Second Division:
  - Winners: 2003–04
- Belgian Third Division A:
  - Winners: 1999–2000
