= Belgian Third Division =

- Founded: 1926
- Folded: 2016
- Country: Belgium
- Confederation: UEFA
- Divisions: Belgian Third Division A Belgian Third Division B
- Number of clubs: 36
- Level on pyramid: 3
- Promotion to: Belgian Second Division
- Relegation to: Belgian Fourth Division
- Domestic cup: Belgian Cup
- Last champions: Beerschot Wilrijk and Hamme (2015–16)

The Belgian Third Division (Dutch: Derde klasse, French: Division III) was the third highest level in Belgian football. It had two leagues of 18 teams each (A and B) at the same level. This competition, originally known as the Belgian Promotion (Dutch: Bevordering) was first played in the 1926-27 season with three leagues, then with four leagues between 1931 and 1952. From 1952 on, only two leagues remained and the competition was named the Third Division. Originally set to 16 clubs, the number of clubs in each division was increased in 2009 to 18 clubs. At the end of the regular season, both league winners promoted to the second division and a play-off was played to determine a possible third club to promote. The champion of the third division was determined after a two-legged match between the winners of the two leagues. If those matches ended in a draw, a third match was played on a neutral ground. However, in recent years this final game was not organised anymore due to lack of interest. In 2016, the Belgian Third Division was replaced by the Belgian Second Amateur Division.

== Competition format and naming ==
=== Competition ===
The competition consisted of the regular season (two leagues of 18 teams, 34 matchdays each) followed by the third division play-off (7 teams, 3 matchdays). Each team played 34 matches during the regular season (from August till May). The regular season was divided in 3 periods with the first period consisting of the first 10 match days, the second period consisting of the next 12 match days and the third period consisting of the final 12 match days. For each period in each league, a ranking was computed in the same way as the overall league rankings (three points for a win, one point for a draw and no point for a loss). In each league, the winner of the regular season promoted to the second division and the two worst-placed teams (17th and 18th) were relegated to the Belgian Fourth Division. The 16th placed teams had to play the Promotion play-off with teams from Promotion (see Fourth Division playoff).

The three period winners in each league qualified for the third division play-off along with the 16th-placed team in the second division. If the league winner also won one or more periods or that a period winner won more than one period, finished in the last three places or had not received a second division license, the best-placed teams in the league overall ranking qualified for the play-off so that 3 teams in each league qualified. The playoff was played in three rounds. In the first round, the 6 qualifiers from the third division ware drawn in three matches played in two legs. The winners of the first round and the 16th-placed team from the second division entered the second round (2 matches played in two legs). The final round was also played in two legs. The winner qualified for the second division. In each round, the away goals rule was used to declare the winner in case of aggregate tie score. If each team had scored the same number of away goals, the teams played extra time of two 15-minutes periods. If there was still a tie, the away goals rule was applied once again. Finally, the matches went to penalties.

As a part of changes in the Belgian league system that were implemented in 2016, when the third division was rebranded as Second Amateur Division, the 2015–16 season had 37 teams (one division has 19 and the other, 18) and the division contracted to 16 teams. The three-period rankings and promotion playoff between third and fourth tier teams were scrapped. The 7th to 17th (or 18th) placers in each group remained in the division, which is called Belgian Second Amateur Division and now lies at the fourth level of the Belgian football pyramid, while the last placers relegated to the new fifth level called Belgian Third Amateur Division.

From the 2016–17 season onwards, the Belgian First Amateur Division is made up of nine teams relegated from the 2015–16 Belgian Second Division, the 2015–16 champion and runner-up of each Third Division group, and three winners of a qualifying playoff contested by 3rd to 6th ranked teams. These teams must meet technical and administrative criteria.

=== Naming ===
- 1926-1952: Promotion
- 1952–2016: Third Division

== Past winners ==
=== Past play-off winners ===
The final games of the third division play-off are listed here:

- 1994: V.V. Overpelt Fabriek beat R. Cappellen F.C.
- 1995: K.V. Turnhout beat K. Tesamen Hogerop Diest (2-0)
- 1996: F.C. Denderleeuw beat R. Union Saint-Gilloise (4-1)
- 1997: K. Sint-Niklase S.K.E. beat K.F.C. Strombeek
- 1998: R.C.S. Visétois beat K.S.V. Ingelmunster (2-1)
- 1999: K.M.S.K. Deinze beat Eendracht Hekelgem (3-0)
- 2000: K. Heusden-Zolder beat K.V. Kortrijk (4-1)
- 2001: K.V. Kortrijk beat R.C.S. Visétois (2-1)
- 2002: K.F.C. Vigor Wuitens Hamme beat K.V. Oostende (4-1)
- 2003: V.C. Eendracht Aalst 2002 beat Oud-Heverlee Leuven (1-1 after extra-time, 8-7 after penalty shootout)
- 2004: K.V. Kortrijk beat K.V. Turnhout
- 2005: Oud-Heverlee Leuven beat C.S. Visé (4-2 after extra-time)
- 2006: Racing Waregem beat R.O.C. de Charleroi-Marchienne (1-0)
- 2007: K.F.C. Verbroedering Geel beat U.R. Namur (3-0 aggregate score)
- 2008: U.R. Namur beat C.S. Visé (0-0 aggregate score, 6-5 after penalty shootout)
- 2009: Royal Boussu Dour Borinage beat K.V. Woluwe-Zaventem (5-1 aggregate score)
- 2010: K. Rupel Boom F.C. beat UR La Louvière Centre (5-4 aggregate score)
- 2011: Sportkring Sint-Niklaas beat K.V. Woluwe-Zaventem (2-1 aggregate score)
- 2012: K.S.V. Oudenaarde beat UR La Louvière Centre (1-1 aggregate score, 5-4 penalty shootout)
- 2013: AS Verbroedering Geel beat K.R.C. Mechelen (4-1 aggregate score)
- 2014: K. Patro Eisden Maasmechelen beat Royale Union Saint-Gilloise (3-2 aggregate score)
- 2015: Not played. K.M.S.K. Deinze promoted (KS Kermt-Hasselt and FCV Dender EH were denied licenses).
- 2016: Play-off abolished.

== See also ==
- Belgian Third Division A
- Belgian Third Division B
