= RWS Bruxelles =

Association football club in Belgium

- Full name: Royal White Star Bruxelles
- Nickname: Les Étoilés
- Founded: 1948
- Dissolved: 2017
- Ground: Stade Edmond Machtens, Molenbeek-Saint-Jean, Brussels
- Capacity: 15,266
Home colours	Away colours

RWS Bruxelles (Royal White Star Bruxelles) was a Belgian football club located in the municipality of Molenbeek-Saint-Jean, Brussels.

== History ==
The crest of Royal White Star Woluwe FC, kept until the name change in 2013.

The club, founded in 1948, was formerly known as Kapelleveld FC, playing in Evere, but they changed their name in 1950 to Woluwe FC when they moved to the Stade Fallon in Woluwe-Saint-Lambert. In 1959, Woluwe FC left the Stade Fallon to play in Kapelleveld in a stadium located Avenue Albert Dumonlaan. In 1963, as the main club from Woluwe, White Star AC, merged with the famous RR de Bruxelles, becoming the RR White, Woluwe FC changed their name to White Star Woluwe FC, taking over the star of the former club's logo. In 1972, the club moved from their stadium in Kapelleveld to the 2nd ground of the Stade Fallon, home of the RR White. The next year, as RR White merged with the R Daring Club Molenbeek and moved to the Edmond Machtens Stadium in Molenbeek-Saint-Jean, White Star Woluwe FC took over the main ground of the Stade Fallon. In 2013, the team changed name again, to Royal White Star Bruxelles, and three years later, following a reform in the Belgian football pyramid, finished first in the new Second Division but was refused a professional football license after running into financial difficulties and was thus not allowed to play in the First Division A or B. Instead, RWS Bruxelles was demoted to the First Amateur Division. As a result, runner-up Eupen was promoted instead and ninth placed Roeselare avoided relegation. RWS was relegated again, this time to the Second Amateur Division, from which the club was expelled in September 2017 and automatically placed in last position. The club failed to pay its outstanding debts and its matricule was later cancelled. The club ceased to exist following a court order.

=== Affiliated clubs ===
The following club was affiliated with R.W.S. Bruxelles:

- (England) Sheffield United F.C.

== See also ==
- Category:RWS Bruxelles players
