= CS Visé =

Belgian football club

Visé
- Full name: Cercle Sportif Visé
- Nickname: Les Oies ('The Geese')
- Founded: 1924; 102 years ago
- Dissolved: 28 October 2014
- Ground: Stade de la Cité de l'Oie, Visé
- Capacity: 5,400

Cercle Sportif Visé was a Belgian association football club based in the city of Visé, Liège. The club played its home matches at Stade de la Cité de l'Oie in Visé. They were nicknamed Les Oies (the geese), after the city of Visé nickname. On 28 October 2014, the club was declared bankrupt.

== History ==
The club was founded in 1924 as C.S. Visétois and received the matricule number 369 from the Belgian Football Association. Their first spell in national football was in 1948–49, and they remained at this level for two consecutive seasons. Starting from the 1960s, the club played several seasons in the Belgian Promotion again, each decade until the 1990s. In 1996, they finally reached the third division, by winning their series in promotion (serie C). In July 1994, they achieved their best result in the Belgian Cup by reaching the round of 32, to lose to rivals Standard Liège. In 1998, they were promoted to the second division via the promotion playoff. They played two consecutive seasons at this level, then were relegated, to come back the next year in the second division, this time for 4 consecutive seasons. They were promoted to second division in the 2009–10 season.

In 2011 the club was acquired by Indonesian conglomerate Bakrie Group, led by Aga Bakrie. Several Indonesian players were brought to the club as a result of the takeover. On 13 May 2014, the club was taken over by investors from England and Belgium. Former England international Terry Fenwick was appointed head coach and former Charlton and Millwall head of recruitment Steve Davies was appointed director of football.

On 28 October 2014, the nv behind the club was declared bankrupt. Several players and staff members were released, but the club continued the season under a liquidator with youth players, among others. In June 2015, the trustee informed the Royal Belgian Football Association (KBVB) that no reliable solution had been found to restore the club to a healthy economy.
