= Belgian Second Division =

- Founded: 1909
- Folded: 2016
- Replaced by: Belgian First Division B
- Country: Belgium
- Confederation: UEFA
- Number of clubs: 17 (2015–16)
- Level on pyramid: 2
- Promotion to: Belgian First Division A
- Relegation to: Belgian Third Division
- Domestic cup: Belgian Cup
- Last champions: WS Brussels (2015–16)

The Belgian Second Division was the second-highest division in the Belgian football league system, one level below the Belgian Pro League. It was founded by the Royal Belgian Football Association in 1909 and folded in 2016, when it was replaced by the Belgian First Division B (known as the Proximus League for sponsorship reasons)).

== History ==
The second division was created in 1909 and was known as the Promotion Dutch: bevordering at the time. From 1923 on there were two leagues in that division (called Promotion A and Promotion B). In 1926, the system changed, with only one league of 14 clubs at the second-highest level now called Division I. At the end of the 1930–31 season, Division I was split into two leagues again (of 14 clubs each). Each year, the bottom two teams of each league were relegated to Division II and the top two clubs were promoted to the Premier Division. In 1952, the division was renamed to Division II with 16 teams (one league). The first two clubs qualified for the first division. In 1974, play-offs were introduced to qualify a second team to the top level. Finally, in 1994, the number of clubs was increased to 18 clubs. A win earns three points since the 1993–94 season. In the seasons 2008-09 and 2009–10, the second division was played between 19 teams following the Namur – Geel case (both teams claiming their rights to access the second division). In June 2015, reforms in top three divisions were approved by the Belgian FA, with the second tier reformed and renamed Belgian First Division B starting in 2016. The Belgian Second Division ceased to exist following the 2015–16 season.

== Competition format and naming ==
=== Competition ===
The season consisted of a regular season (18 teams, 34 matchdays) and the play-offs. The regular season was a double round-robin tournament played from August to May, with a 3 weeks hiatus in the winter. Beside the overall classification of teams, 3 other period rankings were computed. The first period consisted of the first 10 matchdays, the second of the next 12 matchdays and the third of the final 12 matchdays. At the beginning of each period, all teams started with a blank record for the next period ranking. The winner of the overall regular season was promoted to the first division. The teams with the best record in each of the 3 periods qualified for the play-offs, together with the 15th-placed team in the first division. If one or several periods were won by the regular season champion or if another team won multiple periods, the best-placed teams in the overall ranking qualified for the play-offs, to allow it to be played between 4 teams. The play-offs were a double round-robin, with the winner earning a place in the first division.

The standings, for both the regular season and the 3 periods, were determined by the following criteria, in order:

1. number of points
2. number of wins
3. goal-average
4. a play-off at a neutral venue (with extra time and penalty shootout if necessary)

The standings during the play-offs were determined following the same criteria, excluding goal-average. Also a team to play in the first division had to have a professional license. A team removed due to lack of a license was replaced by the next preceding team in the overall regular season ranking. For the automatic promotion spot (as opposed to the play-offs) the team must have ranked as a top three club. The lack of any club to replace an excluded club would result in a less than full roster competing in the first division.

The two lowest-placed teams relegated to the third division (which is divided into 2 leagues of 18 clubs) and were replaced by the two champions of that division. Furthermore, the 16th-placed team in the second division played the third division play-off with 6 teams from the third division, entering in the second round of those playoffs. The winner of this play-off remained or promoted to the second division.

As part of changes in the league system to be implemented in the 2016–17 season, the 2015–16 transitional season saw the champions promoted and 9 teams relegated to the third division, while no team was promoted from the third division.

=== Naming ===
- 1905–1926: Promotion
- 1926–1952: Division I
- 1952–2008: Division II
- 2008–2010: EXQI League
- 2010–2012: Division II
- 2012–2016: Belgacom League

=== Past winners ===
Last 5 winners:

Season	Winner	Runner-up	Playoff Winner
2011–12	Charleroi	Waasland-Beveren	Waasland-Beveren
2012–13	Oostende	Mouscron-Péruwelz	Cercle Brugge
2013–14	Westerlo	Eupen	Mouscron-Péruwelz
2014–15	Sint-Truiden	Lommel United	OH Leuven
2015–16	WS Brussels	Eupen	No playoff
