= List of Belgian football transfers summer 2009 =

This is a list of Belgian football transfers for the 2009 summer transfer window. Only transfers involving a team from the Jupiler League are listed.

The summer transfer window opened on 1 July 2009, although some transfers took place prior to that date; The first non-free non-loan move was completed on 3 January 2009. Players without a club may join one at any time, regardless if during or between transfer windows. The transfer window ended on 31 August 2009, although a few completed transfers were only announced a few days later.

== Sorted by date ==
=== January 2009 ===
Date	Name	Moving from	Moving to	Fee
3 January 2009	(Niger) Ouwo Moussa Maazou	Lokeren	(Russia) CSKA Moscow	Undisclosed
23 January 2009	Christophe Lepoint	Mouscron	Gent	Undisclosed

=== February 2009 ===
Date	Name	Moving from	Moving to	Fee
6 February 2009	Glenn Van Asten	Heist	Westerlo	Undisclosed

=== March 2009 ===
Date	Name	Moving from	Moving to	Fee
9 March 2009	(Morocco) Soufiane Bidaoui	Diegem	Westerlo	Undisclosed
19 March 2009	Kevin Vandenbergh	Germinal Beerschot	(Netherlands) Utrecht	Loan Return

=== April 2009 ===
Date	Name	Moving from	Moving to	Fee
1 April 2009	Alessandro Cordaro	Mons	Charleroi	Undisclosed
16 April 2009	(Czech Republic) Stanislav Vlček	Anderlecht	(Czech Republic) Slavia Prague	Undisclosed
23 April 2009	Gilles Lentz	Standard Liège	Genk	Undisclosed
24 April 2009	Tom De Mul	Genk	(Spain) Sevilla	Loan Return

=== May 2009 ===
Date	Name	Moving from	Moving to	Fee
2 May 2009	Franck Defays	Charleroi	(Luxembourg) F91 Dudelange	Undisclosed
2 May 2009	Christophe Grégoire	Charleroi	(Netherlands) Willem II	Loan Return
4 May 2009	Steven de Petter	Dender	Westerlo	Undisclosed
4 May 2009	(Netherlands) Sherjill MacDonald	(England) West Bromwich Albion	Germinal Beerschot	Undisclosed^{1}
13 May 2009	Mathieu Cornet	Standard	Germinal Beerschot	Undisclosed
16 May 2009	(Ghana) Nana Asare	Mechelen	(Netherlands) FC Utrecht	Undisclosed
22 May 2009	(Croatia) Dario Smoje	Gent	(Greece) Panionios	Free
25 May 2009	(Senegal) Elimane Coulibaly	Kortrijk	Gent	Free
25 May 2009	Jonas De Roeck	Gent	(Germany) FC Augsburg	Free
26 May 2009	Yoni Buyens	Lierse	Mechelen	Undisclosed
26 May 2009	(Gabon) Aymar Moro	(France) Lille	Mechelen	Undisclosed
28 May 2009	Marc Hendrikx	Sint-Truiden	Eupen	Free

- ^{1} MacDonald was on loan to Roeselare from West Bromwich Albion, now sold to Germinal Beerschot.

=== End of 2008-09 season ===
After the end of the 2008-09 season, several players have returned from loan to another club or did not have had their contracts extended. They are listed here when the date is otherwise not specified. For a list of transfers where the returned players are also mentioned, see.

Date	Name	Moving from	Moving to	Fee
End of 2008-09 season	(Netherlands) Harrie Gommans	Roeselare	(Netherlands) Roda JC	Loan Return
End of 2008-09 season	Robin Henkens	KVSK United	Genk	Loan Return
End of 2008-09 season	Edouard Kabamba	(Spain) Real Madrid Castilla	Standard Liège	Loan Return
End of 2008-09 season	(Brazil) Kanu	Cercle Brugge	Anderlecht	Loan Return
End of 2008-09 season	(Senegal) Cheikhou Kouyaté	Kortrijk	Anderlecht	Loan Return
End of 2008-09 season	(United States) Patrick Lane	Cercle Brugge	Unknown	End of Contract
End of 2008-09 season	Tim Matthys	(Greece) Panthrakikos	Zulte Waregem	Loan Return
End of 2008-09 season	Silvio Proto	Germinal Beerschot	Anderlecht	Loan Return
End of 2008-09 season	(Cameroon) Sébastien Siani	Sint-Truiden	Anderlecht	Loan Return
End of 2008-09 season	(France) Grégory Christ	(Germany) MSV Duisburg	Charleroi	Loan Return

=== June 2009 ===
Date	Name	Moving from	Moving to	Fee
2 June 2009	(South Africa) Elrio Van Heerden	Club Brugge	(England) Blackburn Rovers	Free
3 June 2009	(North Macedonia) Igor Mitreski	Germinal Beerschot	(Germany) FC Energie Cottbus	Loan Return
5 June 2009	Bjorn Vleminckx	Mechelen	(Netherlands) NEC	Undisclosed
8 June 2009	David Destorme	Dender	Mechelen	Free
8 June 2009	(Senegal) Ibrahima Gueye	(Serbia) Red Star Belgrade	Lokeren	Undisclosed
9 June 2009	(North Macedonia) Boban Grnčarov	Gent	(Cyprus) APOEL	Undisclosed^{2}
11 June 2009	(Montenegro) Bojan Božović	(Hungary) Kaposvári Rákóczi	Cercle Brugge	Undisclosed
11 June 2009	Ludovic Buysens	Mons	Sint-Truiden	Undisclosed
11 June 2009	(Denmark) Steffen Ernemann	(Denmark) Silkeborg	Zulte Waregem	Free
12 June 2009	Brecht Capon	Club Brugge	Kortrijk	Loan
12 June 2009	(France) Teddy Chevalier	Francs Borains	Zulte Waregem	Undisclosed
12 June 2009	(France) Moussa Koita	Virton	Genk	Undisclosed
12 June 2009	Glenn Verbauwhede	Club Brugge	Kortrijk	Loan
13 June 2009	Maxim Geurden	Genk	Germinal Beerschot	Undisclosed
13 June 2009	(Czech Republic) Štěpán Kučera	(Czech Republic) Jablonec	Club Brugge	Loan Return
15 June 2009	Tom Vandenbossche	Club Brugge	Kortrijk	Undisclosed
16 June 2009	(Croatia) Nikica Jelavić	Zulte Waregem	(Austria) Rapid Wien	Undisclosed^{3}
16 June 2009	(France) Jonathan Mendes	(France) Auxerre	Standard Liège	Undisclosed
16 June 2009	(France) Jérémy Taravel	(France) Lille	Zulte Waregem	Undisclosed^{4}
17 June 2009	Hervé Kage	Anderlecht	Charleroi	Undisclosed
17 June 2009	(Cameroon) Hervé Onana	Waasland	Sint-Truiden	Undisclosed
18 June 2009	Stijn de Wilde	Lokeren	Beveren	Free
19 June 2009	(Netherlands) Istvan Bakx	Kortrijk	Genk	Free
19 June 2009	(Serbia) Mladen Lazarević	Roeselare	Kortrijk	Undisclosed
19 June 2009	(France) Badis Lebbihi	(France) Lille	Zulte Waregem	Undisclosed
19 June 2009	Andréa Mbuyi-Mutombo	(England) Portsmouth	Standard Liège	Free
19 June 2009	(France) Loris Reina	Zulte Waregem	Kortrijk	Undisclosed
19 June 2009	(Jordan) Abdullah Deeb	(Jordan) Shabab Al-Ordon	Mechelen	Undisclosed
20 June 2009	Nicolas Digiugno	Charleroi	Olympic Charleroi	Loan
21 June 2009	(Tunisia) Fabien Camus	Charleroi	Genk	Undisclosed
21 June 2009	(Germany) Torben Joneleit	Charleroi	Genk	Undisclosed
21 June 2009	Tom Soetaers	Genk	Kortrijk	Free
21 June 2009	(France) Marvin Turcan	Mouscron	Brussels	Undisclosed
21 June 2009	(France) Kristopher Vicente	Charleroi	Brussels	Undisclosed
22 June 2009	(Brazil) Renan Boufleur	(Brazil) Santos	Anderlecht	Undisclosed
22 June 2009	(Brazil) Cleber	(Brazil) Juventude	Club Brugge	Undisclosed
22 June 2009	(North Macedonia) Tomislav Pačovski	(North Macedonia) Vardar	Germinal Beerschot	Undisclosed
22 June 2009	(Serbia) Nebojša Pavlović	Lokeren	Kortrijk	Free
23 June 2009	Janis Coppin	Zulte Waregem	Mons	Undisclosed
23 June 2009	(Serbia) Dušan Đokić	(Cyprus) Omonia	Club Brugge	Loan Return
23 June 2009	(Senegal) Khalifa Sankaré	Zulte Waregem	Mons	Undisclosed
23 June 2009	(Morocco) Salaheddine Sbai	Charleroi	(France) Nîmes	Undisclosed
24 June 2009	Bernt Evens	Club Brugge	Cercle Brugge	Undisclosed
24 June 2009	(Czech Republic) Ondřej Mazuch	(Italy) Fiorentina	Anderlecht	Loan
25 June 2009	(Guadeloupe) Cédric Collet	Mons	Standard Liège	Undisclosed
25 June 2009	(Netherlands) Donovan Deekman	(Netherlands) Heerenveen	Lokeren	Undisclosed
25 June 2009	(Trinidad and Tobago) Khaleem Hyland	(England) Portsmouth	Zulte Waregem	Free^{5}
25 June 2009	Peter Mollez	Kortrijk	Dender	Undisclosed
25 June 2009	(Cameroon) Patrice Noukeu	Gent	KVSK United	Loan^{6}
25 June 2009	Bram Vandenbussche	Cercle Brugge	Roeselare	Undisclosed
26 June 2009	(Netherlands) Ryan Donk	(Netherlands) AZ	Club Brugge	Undisclosed
26 June 2009	(Netherlands) Samir El Gaaouiri	(Netherlands) Venlo	Roeselare	Undisclosed
27 June 2009	Kristof Snelders	Cercle Brugge	Beveren	Undisclosed
29 June 2009	(Croatia) Leon Benko	Standard Liège	Kortrijk	Free
30 June 2009	(Brazil) Diogo	Morlanwelz	Charleroi	Undisclosed
30 June 2009	Geoffrey Ghesquière	Deinze	Roeselare	Free
30 June 2009	(Spain) Jose Antonio Salcedo	(Spain) Albacete	Mouscron	Undisclosed

- ^{2} The loan period of Grnčarov to Maccabi Petah Tikva ended, now sold to APOEL.
- ^{3} Nikica Jelavić was already on loan to Rapid Wien, now sold.
- ^{4} Jérémy Taravel was already on loan from Lille, now bought.
- ^{5} The loan period of Hyland from Portsmouth ended. As his contract with Portsmouth had expired, he signed with Zulte Waregem.
- ^{6} The loan period of Noukeu to KVSK United had ended, but a new loan deal for another season was negotiated by the clubs.

=== July 2009 ===
Date	Name	Moving from	Moving to	Fee
1 July 2009	Didier Dheedene	Germinal Beerschot	Cappellen	Free
1 July 2009	(Netherlands) Sergio Hellings	Westerlo	Roeselare	Undisclosed
1 July 2009	(Spain) Carlos Hernández	(Spain) Valencia B	Mouscron	Undisclosed
1 July 2009	(France) Bertrand Laquait	Charleroi	(France) Croix de Savoie	Undisclosed
1 July 2009	Björn Smits	Roeselare	Cappellen	Free
2 July 2009	Grégory Dufer	Tubize	Standard	Loan Return
2 July 2009	(Netherlands) Collins John	(England) Fulham	Roeselare	Undisclosed
2 July 2009	(Portugal) Tiago	(Portugal) Vitória Guimarães	Standard	Free
2 July 2009	(Ivory Coast) Moussa Traoré	(Burkina Faso) CF Ouagadougou	Standard	Loan
3 July 2009	(Spain) Jonathan Aspas	(Italy) Piacenza	Mouscron	Undisclosed
3 July 2009	(Israel) Salim Toama	Standard	(Greece) AEL	Undisclosed
5 July 2009	(Cameroon) Antonio Ghomsi	(Italy) Siena	Mechelen	Loan
5 July 2009	(Democratic Republic of the Congo) Pieter Mbemba	Mechelen	(Turkey) Sivasspor	Undisclosed
6 July 2009	Sander Debroux	Sint-Truiden	OH Leuven	Undisclosed
6 July 2009	Denis Odoi	OH Leuven	Sint-Truiden	Undisclosed
6 July 2009	Kurt Weuts	Sint-Truiden	OH Leuven	Loan
7 July 2009	(United States) Oguchi Onyewu	Standard Liège	(Italy) AC Milan	Free
7 July 2009	(Bosnia and Herzegovina) Sulejman Smajić	Dender EH	Lokeren	Undisclosed
8 July 2009	(Croatia) Tomo Šokota	(Croatia) Dinamo Zagreb	Lokeren	Undisclosed
8 July 2009	Nicolas Timmermans	Westerlo	Mons	Undisclosed
9 July 2009	(Croatia) Ivan Bošnjak	Genk	(Greece) Iraklis	Free
9 July 2009	Stéphane Demets	Kortrijk	Mons	Undisclosed
9 July 2009	(Ghana) Baba Iddi	(North Macedonia) Vardar	Lokeren	Undisclosed
10 July 2009	(Brazil) Alex Moraes	(Brazil) Juventude	Standard Liège	Undisclosed
13 July 2009	(France) Cédric Berthelin	Dender EH	Mouscron	Undisclosed
13 July 2009	(France) Maxime Brillault	(France) Amiens	Charleroi	Undisclosed
13 July 2009	(France) Sébastien Chabbert	(France) Amiens	Charleroi	Undisclosed
15 July 2009	Rocky Peeters	Germinal Beerschot	(Cyprus) Paralimni FC	Loan
15 July 2009	(Costa Rica) Bryan Ruiz	Gent	(Netherlands) Twente	Undisclosed
17 July 2009	(Russia) Dmitri Bulykin	Anderlecht	(Germany) Fortuna Düsseldorf	Loan
17 July 2009	Stijn De Smet	Cercle Brugge	Gent	Undisclosed
18 July 2009	(Spain) Alejandro Cortell	(Spain) Valencia B	Mouscron	Undisclosed
18 July 2009	(Spain) Manuel Micó	(Spain) Valencia B	Mouscron	Undisclosed
19 July 2009	Fazlı Kocabaş	Standard Liège	Eupen	Undisclosed
19 July 2009	Mohamed Messoudi	(Netherlands) Willem II	Kortrijk	Undisclosed
19 July 2009	(France) Thomas Phibel	Standard Liège	Antwerp	Free^{7}
20 July 2009	(Brazil) Alex da Silva	Genk	Sint-Truiden	Free
20 July 2009	(Democratic Republic of the Congo) Bavon Tshibuabua	Free Player	Germinal Beerschot	Free
24 July 2009	Kevin Goeman	(France) Lens	Zulte Waregem	Loan
28 July 2009	(Slovakia) Adam Nemec	Genk	(Germany) 1. FC Kaiserslautern	Undisclosed
29 July 2009	Philippe Clement	Club Brugge	Germinal Beerschot	Undisclosed
29 July 2009	Alan Da Silva	Standard Liège	Tubize	Undisclosed
29 July 2009	Alex Da Silva	Standard Liège	Tubize	Undisclosed
30 July 2009	(Serbia) Dušan Đokić	Club Brugge	(Israel) Maccabi Tel Aviv	Undisclosed

- ^{7} The loan period of Phibel to FC Brussels had ended, but he was released and signed for Antwerp.

=== August 2009 ===
Date	Name	Moving from	Moving to	Fee
3 August 2009	(Argentina) Hernán Losada	Anderlecht	(Netherlands) Heerenveen	Loan
3 August 2009	Tim Matthys	Zulte Waregem	Lierse	Undisclosed
5 August 2009	(France) Robert Maah	(Italy) Grosseto	Mouscron	Undisclosed
5 August 2009	(Italy) Tommaso Pieroni	(Italy) Fortis Juventus	Mouscron	Undisclosed
6 August 2009	Christian Benteke	Standard Liège	Kortrijk	Loan
6 August 2009	(France) David Grondin	Mechelen	Mons	Undisclosed
6 August 2009	Kristof Van Hout	Kortrijk	Standard Liège	Undisclosed
8 August 2009	(Czech Republic) Štěpán Kučera	Club Brugge	Roeselare	Loan
10 August 2009	David Vandenbroeck	Charleroi	Kortrijk	Loan
14 August 2009	Daan De Pever	Dender	Roeselare	Undisclosed
17 August 2009	(Rwanda) Henri Munyaneza	Germinal Beerschot	Dender	Loan
18 August 2009	Damien Lahaye	Charleroi	Kortrijk	Loan
19 August 2009	Tom Van Imschoot	Westerlo	Mons	Free
21 August 2009	Laurent Ciman	Club Brugge	Kortrijk	Loan
21 August 2009	Carl Hoefkens	(England) West Bromwich Albion	Club Brugge	Free
21 August 2009	(Hungary) László Köteles	(Hungary) Diósgyőri	Genk	Undisclosed
21 August 2009	(Montenegro) Stefan Nikolić	Lierse	Roeselare	Loan
26 August 2009	(Croatia) Ivan Perišić	(France) Sochaux	Club Brugge	€250,000
27 August 2009	(Brazil) Diogo	Charleroi	None	Released
27 August 2009	(Israel) Rami Gershon	(Israel) Hapoel Rishon Lezion	Standard Liège	Loan
27 August 2009	(Peru) Johan Sotil	Westerlo	None	Released
28 August 2009	(France) Peter Franquart	(France) Lille	Charleroi	Loan
31 August 2009	(Bosnia and Herzegovina) Adnan Mravac	(Austria) Mattersburg	Westerlo	Undisclosed
28 August 2009	(Finland) Berat Sadik	(Germany) Arminia Bielefeld	Zulte Waregem	Loan
28 August 2009	(Serbia) Đorđe Svetličić	Germinal Beerschot	None	Released
29 August 2009	(Spain) Daniel Calvo	Kortrijk	OH Leuven	Loan
29 August 2009	(Bosnia and Herzegovina) Boubacar Diabang	(Spain) Murcia	Mechelen	Released
30 August 2009	(Cameroon) Dorge Kouemaha	(Germany) MSV Duisburg	Club Brugge	Undisclosed
30 August 2009	(Germany) Marc-André Kruska	Club Brugge	(Germany) Energie Cottbus	Undisclosed
31 August 2009	(France) Cédric Bétrémieux	Roeselare	OH Leuven	Loan
31 August 2009	(Brazil) Felipe	(Brazil) Coritiba	Standard Liège	Undisclosed
31 August 2009	(Ukraine) Aleksandr Jakovenko	Anderlecht	Westerlo	Loan
31 August 2009	Benjamin Lutun	Roeselare	Ieper	Undisclosed
31 August 2009	(Syria) Sanharib Malki	Germinal Beerschot	Lokeren	Undisclosed
31 August 2009	Massimo Moia	Charleroi	Sint-Truiden	Loan
31 August 2009	(Peru) Nelinho Quina	(Peru) Universitario	Westerlo	Undisclosed
31 August 2009	(Brazil) Victor Ramos	(Brazil) Vitória	Standard Liège	Undisclosed
31 August 2009	(Ivory Coast) Bassilia Sakanoko	Mouscron	OH Leuven	Undisclosed
31 August 2009	Nils Schouterden	OH Leuven	Sint-Truiden	Undisclosed
31 August 2009	Daan Vaesen	Sint-Truiden	OH Leuven	Undisclosed
31 August 2009	(Iceland) Bjarni Viðarsson	(Netherlands) Twente	Roeselare	Undisclosed
31 August 2009	(Cameroon) Eric Yopa	(Cameroon) Fovu Baham	Zulte Waregem	Undisclosed

=== September 2009 ===
Date	Name	Moving from	Moving to	Fee
1 September 2009	Thomas Buffel	Cercle Brugge	Genk	Undisclosed
1 September 2009	Olivier Claessens	Racing Mechelen	Cercle Brugge	Undisclosed
1 September 2009	Hans Cornelis	Genk	Cercle Brugge	Undisclosed
1 September 2009	Sem Franssen	Genk	None	Released
1 September 2009	(Portugal) Ricardo Rocha	(England) Tottenham Hotspur	Standard Liège	Free
1 September 2009	Sven Verdonck	Genk	(Netherlands) Fortuna Sittard	Undisclosed
1 September 2009	Jelle Vossen	Genk	Cercle Brugge	Loan
2 September 2009	(Guinea) Aboubacar M'Baye Camara	Lokeren	(United Arab Emirates) Al-Khaleej	Undisclosed

== Sorted by team ==
=== Anderlecht ===
In: Note: Flags indicate national team as defined under FIFA eligibility rules; some limited exceptions apply. Players may hold more than one non-FIFA nationality.

No.	Pos.	Nation	Player
2	DF	CZE	Ondřej Mazuch (on loan from Fiorentina)
10	FW	BRA	Kanu (loan return from Cercle Brugge)
16	MF	SEN	Cheikhou Kouyaté (loan return from Kortrijk)
24	GK	BEL	Silvio Proto (loan return from Germinal Beerschot)
—	DF	BRA	Renan Boufleur (from Santos)
—	FW	CMR	Sébastien Siani (loan return from Sint-Truiden)

Out: Note: Flags indicate national team as defined under FIFA eligibility rules; some limited exceptions apply. Players may hold more than one non-FIFA nationality.

No.	Pos.	Nation	Player
7	FW	CZE	Stanislav Vlček (to Slavia Prague)
17	MF	ARG	Hernán Losada (on loan to Heerenveen)
20	MF	UKR	Aleksandr Jakovenko (on loan to Westerlo)
—	FW	RUS	Dmitri Bulykin (on loan to Fortuna Düsseldorf)
—	DF	BEL	Hervé Kage (to Charleroi)

=== Cercle Brugge ===
In: Note: Flags indicate national team as defined under FIFA eligibility rules; some limited exceptions apply. Players may hold more than one non-FIFA nationality.

No.	Pos.	Nation	Player
10	FW	MNE	Bojan Božović (from Kaposvári Rákóczi)
—	FW	BEL	Olivier Claessens (from Racing Mechelen)
—	DF	BEL	Hans Cornelis (from Genk)
—	DF	BEL	Bernt Evens (from Club Brugge)
—	FW	BEL	Jelle Vossen (on loan from Genk)

Out: Note: Flags indicate national team as defined under FIFA eligibility rules; some limited exceptions apply. Players may hold more than one non-FIFA nationality.

No.	Pos.	Nation	Player
19	FW	BEL	Stijn De Smet (to Gent)
21	DF	BEL	Bram Vandenbussche (to Roeselare)
—	DF	NED	Wouter Artz (to Volendam)
—	FW	BEL	Thomas Buffel (to Genk)
—	FW	BRA	Kanu (loan return to Anderlecht)
—	GK	USA	Patrick Lane (contract ended)
—	FW	BEL	Kristof Snelders (to Beveren)

=== Charleroi ===
In: Note: Flags indicate national team as defined under FIFA eligibility rules; some limited exceptions apply. Players may hold more than one non-FIFA nationality.

No.	Pos.	Nation	Player
14	MF	BRA	Diogo (from Morlanwelz)
15	GK	FRA	Sébastien Chabbert (from Amiens)
24	MF	FRA	Grégory Christ (loan return from Duisburg)
26	DF	BEL	Hervé Kage (from Anderlecht)
29	MF	BEL	Alessandro Cordaro (from Mons)
55	MF	FRA	Maxime Brillault (from Amiens)
—	DF	FRA	Peter Franquart (on loan from Lille)

Out: Note: Flags indicate national team as defined under FIFA eligibility rules; some limited exceptions apply. Players may hold more than one non-FIFA nationality.

No.	Pos.	Nation	Player
1	GK	BEL	Damien Lahaye (on loan to Kortrijk)
2	DF	BEL	Franck Defays (to F91 Dudelange)
3	DF	MAR	Salaheddine Sbai (to Nîmes)
4	FW	GER	Torben Joneleit (to Racing Genk)
14	MF	BRA	Diogo (released)
15	MF	TUN	Fabien Camus (to Racing Genk)
18	DF	BEL	David Vandenbroeck (on loan to Kortrijk)
28	GK	FRA	Bertrand Laquait (to Croix de Savoie)
29	FW	BEL	Nicolas Digiugno (on loan to Olympic Charleroi)
80	MF	BEL	Christophe Grégoire (to Willem II)
—	DF	BEL	Massimo Moia (on loan to Sint-Truiden)
—	DF	FRA	Kristopher Vicente (to FC Brussels)

=== Club Brugge ===
In: Note: Flags indicate national team as defined under FIFA eligibility rules; some limited exceptions apply. Players may hold more than one non-FIFA nationality.

No.	Pos.	Nation	Player
4	DF	BEL	Carl Hoefkens (from West Bromwich Albion)
9	FW	SRB	Dušan Đokić (loan return from Omonia)
17	DF	BRA	Cleber Sonda (from Juventude)
18	DF	NED	Ryan Donk (from AZ)
44	FW	CRO	Ivan Perišić (from Sochaux)
40	FW	CMR	Dorge Kouemaha (from Duisburg)
—	DF	CZE	Štěpán Kučera (loan return from Baumit Jablonec)

Out: Note: Flags indicate national team as defined under FIFA eligibility rules; some limited exceptions apply. Players may hold more than one non-FIFA nationality.

No.	Pos.	Nation	Player
4	DF	BEL	Bernt Evens (to Cercle Brugge)
6	DF	BEL	Philippe Clement (to Germinal Beerschot)
9	FW	SRB	Dušan Đokić (loaned to Astra Ploieşti)
16	MF	RSA	Elrio van Heerden (to Blackburn Rovers)
28	FW	BEL	Brecht Capon (loaned to Kortrijk)
—	DF	BEL	Laurent Ciman (loaned to Kortrijk)
—	MF	GER	Marc-André Kruska (to Energie Cottbus)
—	DF	CZE	Štěpán Kučera (loaned to Roeselare)
—	GK	BEL	Tom Vandenbossche (to Kortrijk)
—	GK	BEL	Glenn Verbauwhede (loaned to Kortrijk)

=== Racing Genk ===
In: Note: Flags indicate national team as defined under FIFA eligibility rules; some limited exceptions apply. Players may hold more than one non-FIFA nationality.

No.	Pos.	Nation	Player
4	FW	GER	Torben Joneleit (from Charleroi)
7	MF	TUN	Fabien Camus (from Charleroi)
9	FW	FRA	Moussa Koita (from Virton)
11	FW	NED	Istvan Bakx (from Kortrijk)
19	FW	BEL	Thomas Buffel (from Cercle Brugge)
34	MF	BEL	Robin Henkens (loan return from United Overpelt-Lommel)
—	GK	HUN	László Köteles (from Diósgyőri VTK)
—	GK	BEL	Gilles Lentz (from Standard Liège)

Out: Note: Flags indicate national team as defined under FIFA eligibility rules; some limited exceptions apply. Players may hold more than one non-FIFA nationality.

No.	Pos.	Nation	Player
9	FW	CRO	Ivan Bošnjak (to Iraklis)
10	MF	BEL	Tom Soetaers (to Kortrijk)
11	DF	BRA	Alex da Silva (to Sint-Truiden)
14	MF	BEL	Tom De Mul (loan return to Sevilla)
32	FW	SVK	Adam Nemec (to Kaiserslautern)
—	DF	BEL	Hans Cornelis (to Cercle Brugge)
—	GK	BEL	Sem Franssen (released)
—	MF	BEL	Maxim Geurden (to Germinal Beerschot)
—	DF	BEL	Sven Verdonck (to Fortuna Sittard)
—	FW	BEL	Jelle Vossen (on loan to Cercle Brugge)

=== Gent ===
In: Note: Flags indicate national team as defined under FIFA eligibility rules; some limited exceptions apply. Players may hold more than one non-FIFA nationality.

No.	Pos.	Nation	Player
—	FW	SEN	Elimane Coulibaly (from Kortrijk)
—	FW	BEL	Stijn De Smet (from Cercle Brugge)
—	MF	BEL	Christophe Lepoint (from Mouscron)

Out: Note: Flags indicate national team as defined under FIFA eligibility rules; some limited exceptions apply. Players may hold more than one non-FIFA nationality.

No.	Pos.	Nation	Player
2	DF	CRO	Dario Smoje (to Panionios)
16	DF	BEL	Jonas De Roeck (to Augsburg)
20	FW	CRC	Bryan Ruiz (to Twente)
—	DF	MKD	Boban Grnčarov (to APOEL)
—	MF	CMR	Patrice Noukeu (on loan to United Overpelt-Lommel)

=== Germinal Beerschot ===
In: Note: Flags indicate national team as defined under FIFA eligibility rules; some limited exceptions apply. Players may hold more than one non-FIFA nationality.

No.	Pos.	Nation	Player
1	GK	MKD	Tomislav Pačovski (from Vardar)
3	MF	BEL	Maxim Geurden (from Racing Genk)
7	DF	BEL	Philippe Clement (from Club Brugge)
12	MF	KEN	Victor Wanyama (free transfer)
19	FW	NED	Sherjill MacDonald (from West Bromwich Albion)
21	FW	COD	Bavon Tshibuabua (free transfer)
27	FW	BEL	Mathieu Cornet (from Standard Liège)

Out: Note: Flags indicate national team as defined under FIFA eligibility rules; some limited exceptions apply. Players may hold more than one non-FIFA nationality.

No.	Pos.	Nation	Player
1	GK	BEL	Silvio Proto (loan return to Anderlecht)
3	DF	MKD	Igor Mitreski (loan return to Energie Cottbus)
7	MF	BEL	Rocky Peeters (loaned to Enosis Neon Paralimni)
19	FW	BEL	Kevin Vandenbergh (loan return to Utrecht)
25	DF	BEL	Đorđe Svetličić (released)
72	DF	BEL	Didier Dheedene (to Cappellen)
—	FW	SYR	Sanharib Malki (to Lokeren)
—	FW	RWA	Henri Munyaneza (on loan to Verbroedering Dender)

=== Kortrijk ===
In: Note: Flags indicate national team as defined under FIFA eligibility rules; some limited exceptions apply. Players may hold more than one non-FIFA nationality.

No.	Pos.	Nation	Player
—	FW	CRO	Leon Benko (from Standard Liège)
—	FW	BEL	Christian Benteke (on loan from Standard Liège)
—	FW	BEL	Brecht Capon (on loan from Club Brugge)
—	DF	BEL	Laurent Ciman (on loan from Club Brugge)
—	GK	BEL	Damien Lahaye (on loan from Charleroi)
—	DF	SRB	Mladen Lazarević (from Roeselare)
—	MF	BEL	Mohamed Messoudi (from Willem II)
—	MF	SRB	Nebojša Pavlović (from Lokeren Oost-Vlaanderen)
—	DF	FRA	Loris Reina (from Zulte Waregem)
—	MF	BEL	Tom Soetaers (from Racing Genk)
—	GK	BEL	Tom Vandenbossche (from Club Brugge)
—	DF	BEL	David Vandenbroeck (on loan from Charleroi)
—	GK	BEL	Glenn Verbauwhede (on loan from Club Brugge)

Out: Note: Flags indicate national team as defined under FIFA eligibility rules; some limited exceptions apply. Players may hold more than one non-FIFA nationality.

No.	Pos.	Nation	Player
1	GK	BEL	Kristof Van Hout (to Standard Liège)
3	DF	BEL	Stéphane Demets (to Mons)
24	GK	BEL	Peter Mollez (to Dender)
—	FW	NED	Istvan Bakx (to Racing Genk)
—	MF	ESP	Daniel Calvo (to OH Leuven)
—	FW	SEN	Elimane Coulibaly (to Gent)
—	MF	SEN	Cheikhou Kouyaté (loan return to Anderlecht)

=== Lokeren ===
In: Note: Flags indicate national team as defined under FIFA eligibility rules; some limited exceptions apply. Players may hold more than one non-FIFA nationality.

No.	Pos.	Nation	Player
19	MF	BIH	Sulejman Smajić (from Verbroedering Dender)
20	FW	NED	Donovan Deekman (from Heerenveen)
21	FW	SYR	Sanharib Malki (from Germinal Beerschot)
22	FW	GHA	Baba Iddi (from Vardar)
23	DF	SEN	Ibrahima Gueye (from Red Star Belgrade)
27	FW	CRO	Tomo Šokota (from Dinamo Zagreb)

Out: Note: Flags indicate national team as defined under FIFA eligibility rules; some limited exceptions apply. Players may hold more than one non-FIFA nationality.

No.	Pos.	Nation	Player
8	MF	SRB	Nebojša Pavlović (to Kortrijk)
20	FW	NIG	Ouwo Moussa Maazou (to CSKA Moscow)
21	MF	GUI	Aboubacar M'Baye Camara (to Al-Khaleej)
31	FW	BEL	Stijn de Wilde (to Beveren)

=== Mechelen ===
In: Note: Flags indicate national team as defined under FIFA eligibility rules; some limited exceptions apply. Players may hold more than one non-FIFA nationality.

No.	Pos.	Nation	Player
—	MF	BEL	Yoni Buyens (from Lierse)
—	MF	BEL	David Destorme (from Verbroedering Dender)
—	MF	BIH	Boubacar Diabang (from Murcia)
—	MF	CMR	Antonio Ghomsi (on loan from Siena)
—	DF	GAB	Aymar Moro (from Lille)
—	FW	JOR	Abdullah Deeb (from Shabab Al-Ordon)

Out: Note: Flags indicate national team as defined under FIFA eligibility rules; some limited exceptions apply. Players may hold more than one non-FIFA nationality.

No.	Pos.	Nation	Player
2	MF	FRA	David Grondin (to Mons)
17	MF	GHA	Nana Asare (to Utrecht)
18	FW	BEL	Bjorn Vleminckx (to N.E.C.)
—	DF	COD	Pieter Mbemba (to Sivasspor)

=== Mouscron ===
In: Note: Flags indicate national team as defined under FIFA eligibility rules; some limited exceptions apply. Players may hold more than one non-FIFA nationality.

No.	Pos.	Nation	Player
2	DF	ESP	Carlos Hernández (from Valencia B)
7	FW	ESP	Alejandro Cortell (from Valencia B)
13	GK	ESP	José Antonio Salcedo (from Albacete)
26	MF	ESP	Jonathan Aspas (from Piacenza)
30	DF	ESP	Manuel Micó (from Valencia B)
31	FW	FRA	Robert Maah (from Grosseto)
—	GK	FRA	Cédric Berthelin (from Verbroedering Dender)
—	MF	ITA	Tommaso Pieroni (from Fortis Juventus)

Out: Note: Flags indicate national team as defined under FIFA eligibility rules; some limited exceptions apply. Players may hold more than one non-FIFA nationality.

No.	Pos.	Nation	Player
26	MF	BEL	Christophe Lepoint (to Gent)
—	FW	CIV	Bassilia Sakanoko (to OH Leuven)
—	MF	FRA	Marvin Turcan (to FC Brussels)

=== Roeselare ===
In: Note: Flags indicate national team as defined under FIFA eligibility rules; some limited exceptions apply. Players may hold more than one non-FIFA nationality.

No.	Pos.	Nation	Player
—	MF	BEL	Daan De Pever (from Verbroedering Dender)
—	MF	NED	Samir El Gaaouiri (from VVV-Venlo)
—	MF	BEL	Geoffrey Ghesquière (from Deinze)
—	DF	NED	Sergio Hellings (from Westerlo)
—	FW	NED	Collins John (from Fulham)
—	DF	CZE	Štěpán Kučera (on loan from Club Brugge)
—	FW	MNE	Stefan Nikolić (on loan from Lierse)
—	DF	BEL	Bram Vandenbussche (from Cercle Brugge)
—	MF	ISL	Bjarni Viðarsson (from Twente)

Out: Note: Flags indicate national team as defined under FIFA eligibility rules; some limited exceptions apply. Players may hold more than one non-FIFA nationality.

No.	Pos.	Nation	Player
9	FW	NED	Sherjill MacDonald (to Germinal Beerschot)
14	DF	BEL	Björn Smits (to Cappellen)
28	DF	SRB	Mladen Lazarević (to Kortrijk)
29	FW	NED	Harrie Gommans (loan return to Roda JC)
—	FW	FRA	Cédric Bétrémieux (to OH Leuven)
—	DF	BEL	Benjamin Lutun (to Ieper)

=== Sint-Truiden ===
In: Note: Flags indicate national team as defined under FIFA eligibility rules; some limited exceptions apply. Players may hold more than one non-FIFA nationality.

No.	Pos.	Nation	Player
—	DF	BRA	Alex da Silva (from Racing Genk)
—	MF	BEL	Ludovic Buysens (from Mons)
—	DF	BEL	Massimo Moia (on loan from Charleroi)
—	DF	BEL	Denis Odoi (from Oud-Heverlee Leuven)
—	FW	CMR	Hervé Onana (from Red Star Waasland)
—	MF	BEL	Nils Schouterden (from Oud-Heverlee Leuven)

Out: Note: Flags indicate national team as defined under FIFA eligibility rules; some limited exceptions apply. Players may hold more than one non-FIFA nationality.

No.	Pos.	Nation	Player
—	MF	BEL	Sander Debroux (to Oud-Heverlee Leuven)
—	MF	BEL	Marc Hendrikx (to Eupen)
—	FW	CMR	Sébastien Siani (loan return to Anderlecht)
—	DF	BEL	Daan Vaesen (to Oud-Heverlee Leuven)
—	FW	BEL	Kurt Weuts (on loan to Oud-Heverlee Leuven)

=== Standard Liège ===
In: Note: Flags indicate national team as defined under FIFA eligibility rules; some limited exceptions apply. Players may hold more than one non-FIFA nationality.

No.	Pos.	Nation	Player
5	DF	BRA	Alex Moraes (from Juventude)
13	MF	BEL	Grégory Dufer (loan return from Tubize)
18	MF	BEL	Andréa Mbuyi-Mutombo (from Portsmouth)
20	FW	CIV	Moussa Traoré (on loan from CF Ouagadougou)
22	FW	GLP	Cédric Collet (from Mons)
24	MF	POR	Tiago (from Vitória de Guimarães)
27	MF	FRA	Jonathan Mendes (from Auxerre)
—	DF	BRA	Felipe (from Coritiba)
—	DF	ISR	Rami Gershon (on loan from Hapoel Rishon Lezion)
—	FW	BEL	Edouard Kabamba (loan return from Real Madrid Castilla)
—	DF	BRA	Victor Ramos (from Vitória)
—	DF	POR	Ricardo Rocha (from Tottenham Hotspur)
—	GK	BEL	Kristof Van Hout (from Kortrijk)

Out: Note: Flags indicate national team as defined under FIFA eligibility rules; some limited exceptions apply. Players may hold more than one non-FIFA nationality.

No.	Pos.	Nation	Player
5	DF	USA	Oguchi Onyewu (to Milan)
11	MF	ISR	Salim Toama (to AEL)
20	FW	CRO	Leon Benko (to Kortrijk)
—	FW	BEL	Christian Benteke (on loan to Kortrijk)
—	FW	BEL	Mathieu Cornet (to Germinal Beerschot)
—	DF	BEL	Alex da Silva (to Tubize)
—	DF	BEL	Fazlı Kocabaş (to Eupen)
—	GK	BEL	Gilles Lentz (to Racing Genk)
—	DF	FRA	Thomas Phibel (to Royal Antwerp)

=== Westerlo ===
In: Note: Flags indicate national team as defined under FIFA eligibility rules; some limited exceptions apply. Players may hold more than one non-FIFA nationality.

No.	Pos.	Nation	Player
—	FW	MAR	Soufiane Bidaoui (from Diegem)
—	MF	BEL	Steven de Petter (from Verbroedering Dender)
—	MF	UKR	Aleksandr Jakovenko (on loan from Anderlecht)
—	DF	BIH	Adnan Mravac (from Mattersburg)
—	DF	PER	Nelinho Quina (from Universitario)
—	MF	BEL	Glenn Van Asten (from Heist)

Out: Note: Flags indicate national team as defined under FIFA eligibility rules; some limited exceptions apply. Players may hold more than one non-FIFA nationality.

No.	Pos.	Nation	Player
24	DF	NED	Sergio Hellings (to Roeselare)
—	FW	PER	Johan Sotil (released)
—	DF	BEL	Nicolas Timmermans (to Mons)
—	MF	BEL	Tom Van Imschoot (to Mons)

=== Zulte Waregem ===
In: Note: Flags indicate national team as defined under FIFA eligibility rules; some limited exceptions apply. Players may hold more than one non-FIFA nationality.

No.	Pos.	Nation	Player
21	MF	TTO	Khaleem Hyland (from Portsmouth)
—	FW	FRA	Teddy Chevalier (from Francs Borains)
—	MF	DEN	Steffen Ernemann (from Silkeborg)
—	GK	BEL	Kevin Goeman (on loan from Lens)
—	DF	FRA	Badis Lebbihi (from Lille)
—	FW	BEL	Tim Matthys (loan return from Panthrakikos)
—	FW	FIN	Berat Sadik (on loan from Arminia Bielefeld)
—	DF	FRA	Jérémy Taravel (from Lille)
—	FW	CMR	Eric Yopa (from Fovu Baham)

Out: Note: Flags indicate national team as defined under FIFA eligibility rules; some limited exceptions apply. Players may hold more than one non-FIFA nationality.

No.	Pos.	Nation	Player
5	DF	FRA	Loris Reina (to Kortrijk)
—	FW	BEL	Janis Coppin (to Mons)
—	FW	CRO	Nikica Jelavić (to Rapid Wien)
—	FW	BEL	Tim Matthys (on loan to Lierse)
—	MF	BEL	Andréa Mbuyi-Mutombo (loan return to Portsmouth)
—	DF	SEN	Khalifa Sankaré (to Mons)
