= 2007–08 Belgian Cup =

Tournament details
- Country: Belgium

Final positions
- Champions: Anderlecht
- Runners-up: Gent

The Belgian Cup 2007-08 was the 53rd staging of the Belgian Cup which is the main knock-out football competition in Belgium, won by Anderlecht.

== Results ==
Sixth round
KV Mechelen	2
Cercle Brugge	4
Club Brugge	4
D3	Francs Borains	2
Standard Liège	3
D2	KVSK United	0
Genk	4
D2	Olympic Charleroi	2
D2	Kortrijk	2
Mouscron	0
D2	KV Oostende	0
Zulte-Waregem	3
Mons	2 (3)
D3	Wetteren	2 (2)
Gent	2
D2	Tienen	0
Anderlecht	2
D2	Hamme	1
Lokeren	~~1~~ 0
D2	Waasland	~~0~~ 5
Dender	4
Westerlo	1
Sint-Truiden	1
D3	Eendracht Aalst	2
Germinal Beerschot	1
D2	Union	0
FC Brussels	2*
D2	OH Leuven	3*
Roeselare	4*
D2	Eupen	1*
Charleroi	3
D2	Deinze	0

Seventh round
Cercle Brugge	1
Club Brugge	0
Standard Liège	2
Genk	0
D2	Kortrijk	2*
Zulte-Waregem	1*
Mons	0*
Gent	1*
Anderlecht	2
D2	Waasland	0
Dender	2
D3	Eendracht Aalst	1
Germinal Beerschot	2 (3)
D2	OH Leuven	2 (1)
Roeselare	2 (5)
Charleroi	2 (4)

Quarter-finals
Cercle Brugge	4 0
Standard Liège	1 4
D2	Kortrijk	5 0
Gent	1 4
Anderlecht	3 1
Dender	0 1
Germinal Beerschot	5 1
Roeselare	1 1

Semifinals
Standard Liège	2 0
Gent	2 4
Anderlecht	1 1
Germinal Beerschot	0 1

Final
Gent	2
Anderlecht	3

=== Legend ===
- * = after extra-time
- D2 = second division
- D3 = third division

== Matches ==
=== Round 6 ===
Teams from the Jupiler League enter the competition at this stage except for the newly promoted teams. The teams from the Jupiler League are seeded and can't meet each other, except again for the newly promoted teams, Dender EH and KV Mechelen. Apart from the 18 teams directly qualified, 14 other teams had qualified through winning in the fifth round:

- 11 from Division 2: Olympic Charleroi, Deinze, Eupen, Hamme, Kortrijk, OH Leuven, KV Oostende, Tienen, Union, KVSK United and Waasland.
- 3 from Division 3: Eendracht Aalst, Francs Borains and Wetteren.

The draw was made on August 29, 2007.

23 November 2007	FC Brussels	2–3 (a.e.t.)	OH Leuven (D2)	Sint-Jans-Molenbeek
20:30	Matumona 47', 75'		Baghdad 59'; Ruytinx 73', 92'	Stadium: Edmond Machtens Stadium; Referee: Johan Verbist

24 November 2007	Club Brugge	4–2	Francs Borains (D3)	Bruges
20:30	Blondel 22', 90'; Van Heerden 59'; Đokić 77'		Issankoy 16'; Duez 44'	Stadium: Jan Breydel Stadion

24 November 2007	Lokeren	~~1–0~~; 0–5 (w/o)	Waasland (D2)	Lokeren
20:00	Tambwe 23'			Stadium: Daknamstadion

24 November 2007	Genk	4–2	Olympic Charleroi (D2)	Genk
20:00	Soetaers 48'; Vandooren 49'; Vrancken 55'; Bošnjak 78'		Banga 23'; Niangbo 64'	Stadium: Cristal Arena

24 November 2007	Charleroi	3–0	Deinze (D2)	Charleroi
20:30	Jovial; Camus		L. Buyssens (red card)	Stadium: Stade du Pays de Charleroi

24 November 2007	Anderlecht	2–1	Hamme (D2)	Brussels
20:30	Legear 31'; Mpenza 71'		Van der Heyden 35'	Stadium: Constant Vanden Stock Stadium

24 November 2007	KV Oostende (D2)	0–3	Zulte-Waregem	Ostend
20:30			Jelavić 27'; Leye 33'; Van Nieuwenhuyze 90'	Stadium: Albertpark

24 November 2007	Roeselare	4–1 (a.e.t.)	Eupen (D2)	Roeselare
20:30	M. Dissa 37', 117'; Kpaka 94'; Vanderbiest 113'		G. Molnar 53'	Stadium: Schiervelde Stadion

24 November 2007	Mons	2–2 (a.e.t.) (3–2 p)	Wetteren (D3)	Mons
20:30	Cordaro 12'; Mirri 29'		Staelens 24'; Schockaert 38'	Stadium: Stade Charles Tondreau

24 November 2007	Kortrijk (D2)	2–0	Mouscron	Kortrijk
20:30	Bétrémieux 18'; Nfor 86'			Stadium: Guldensporen Stadion

24 November 2007	Standard Liège	3–0	KVSK United (D2)	Liège
20:30	Mbokani 15'; Dufer 55'; Dante 64' (pen.)			Stadium: Stade de Sclessin

24 November 2007	Gent	2–0	Tienen (D2)	Ghent
20:30	Marić 7'; Thijs 47'			Stadium: Jules Ottenstadion

24 November 2007	Sint-Truiden	1–2	Eendracht Aalst (D3)	Sint-Truiden
20:30	K. Buvens 45'		Boto 7'; Milenković 90' (o.g.)	Stadium: Staaienveld

25 November 2007	Dender	4–1	Westerlo	Denderleeuw
15:00	N. Sylla 7', 81'; Dufoor 73'; De Storme 90'		Corstjens 22'	Stadium: Florent Beeckmanstadion

25 November 2007	Germinal Beerschot	1–0	Union (D2)	Antwerp
15:00	Dheedene 57'			Stadium: Olympisch Stadion

26 November 2007	Mechelen	2–4	Cercle Brugge	Mechelen
20:45	Imschoot 32'; Vleminckx 37'		De Sutter 1', 6', 13', 22'	Stadium: Veolia Stadium Achter de Kazerne

=== Round 7 ===
The draw was made on December 5, 2007.

12 January 2008	Anderlecht	2–0	Waasland (D2)	Brussels
20:00	Akın 60'; Boussoufa 62'	Report		Stadium: Constant Vanden Stock Stadium; Referee: Jean-Baptist Bultynck

12 January 2008	Mons	0–1 (a.e.t.)	Gent	Mons
20:00		Report	G. Vermuth 122'	Stadium: Stade Charles Tondreau; Referee: Luc Wouters

12 January 2008	Germinal Beerschot	2–2 (a.e.t.) (3–1 p)	OH Leuven (D2)	Antwerp
20:00	Tormena 109'; Malki 120'	Report	Ruytinx 96'; Janssens 107'	Stadium: Olympisch Stadion; Referee: Tim Pots

12 January 2008	Kortrijk (D2)	2–1 (a.e.t.)	Zulte-Waregem	Kortrijk
20:30	Hempte 73'; Nfor 123'	Report	Reina 35'	Stadium: Guldensporen Stadion; Referee: Peter Vervecken

13 January 2008	Dender	2–1	Eendracht Aalst (D3)	Denderleeuw
15:00	Munyaneza 48'; Sylla 84'	Report	Boto 32'	Stadium: Florent Beeckmanstadion; Referee: Serge Gumienny

13 January 2008	Roeselare	2–2 (a.e.t.) (5–4 p)	Charleroi	Roeselare
16:00	Thompson 89'; Smits 109'	Report	Akpala 12'; Camus 107'	Stadium: Schiervelde Stadion; Referee: Joeri Van de Velde

14 January 2008	Standard Liège	2–0	Genk	Liège
20:30	Jovanović 74'; Mbokani 88'	Report		Stadium: Stade de Sclessin; Referee: Johan Verbist

14 January 2008	Cercle Brugge	1–0	Club Brugge	Bruges
20:45	De Sutter 74'	Report		Stadium: Jan Breydel Stadion; Referee: Jérome Efong Nzolo

=== Quarter-finals ===
The draw for the quarter-finals and semi finals was made on January 15, 2008.

==== First legs ====
30 January 2008	Germinal Beerschot	5–1	Roeselare	Antwerp
20:30	Monteyne 13'; Losada 26'; Monteyne 67'; Malki 80'; Cruz 86'	Report	Akgül 32'	Stadium: Olympisch Stadion; Referee: Serge Gumienny

30 January 2008	Kortrijk (D2)	5–1	Gent	Kortrijk
20:30	Bakx 11', 53'; Nfor 55'; Bakx; Bétrémieux 89' (pen.)	Report	Ruiz 72'	Stadium: Guldensporen Stadion

30 January 2008	Anderlecht	3–0	Dender	Brussels
20:30	Vlček 1', 46'; Mpenza 87'	Report		Stadium: Constant Vanden Stock Stadium; Referee: Jérome Efong Nzolo

30 January 2008	Cercle Brugge	4–1	Standard Liège	Bruges
20:45	Nyoni 26'; Fred 45' (o.g.); Snelders 65'; De Sutter 74'	Report	A. Witsel 17'	Stadium: Jan Breydel Stadion

==== Second legs ====
27 February 2008	Roeselare	1–1 (2–6 agg.)	Germinal Beerschot	Roeselare
20:30	Čović 33'	Report	Cruz 88'	Stadium: Schiervelde Stadion; Referee: Jean-Baptist Bultynck

27 February 2008	Gent	4–0 (5a–5 agg.)	Kortrijk (D2)	Ghent
20:30	Marić 12', 20'; Mutavdžić 82'; Ljubijankić 93'	Report		Stadium: Jules Ottenstadion; Referee: Johan Verbist

27 February 2008	Dender	1–1 (1–4 agg.)	Anderlecht	Denderleeuw
20:30	Żewłakow 89'	Report	Goor 17'	Stadium: Florent Beeckmanstadion; Referee: Claude Bourdouxhe

27 February 2008	Standard Liège	4–0 (5–4 agg.)	Cercle Brugge	Liège
20:45	Fellaini 52'; Defour 58'; Goreux 89'; Jovanović 93'	Report		Stadium: Stade de Sclessin; Referee: Paul Allaerts

=== Semi-finals ===
==== First legs ====
18 March 2008	Standard Liège	2–2	Gent	Liège
20:45	De Camargo 18'; Mbokani 35'	Report	Azofeifa 70'; Ruiz 90'	Stadium: Stade de Sclessin; Referee: Serge Gumienny

19 March 2008	Anderlecht	1–0	Germinal Beerschot	Brussels
20:45	Dheedene 87' (o.g.)	Report		Stadium: Constant Vanden Stock Stadium; Referee: Frank De Bleeckere

==== Second legs ====
15 April 2008	Gent	4–0 (6–2 agg.)	Standard Liège	Ghent
20:45	Foley 45+2'; Ruiz 68'; Moia 70'; Vermuth 82'			Stadium: Jules Ottenstadion; Referee: Paul Allaerts

16 April 2008	Germinal Beerschot	1–1 (1–2 agg.)	Anderlecht	Antwerp
20:45	Colman 45'		Vlček 54'	Stadium: Olympisch Stadion; Referee: Jerome Efong Nzolo

=== Final ===
18 May 2008
16:30 CET

Gent	2–3	Anderlecht
Foley 7'; Olufadé 34'		Polák 8'; Boussoufa 70'; Gillet 71'

King Baudouin Stadium, Brussels
Attendance: 50,000
Referee: Serge Gumienny

== See also ==
- Belgian Cup - main article
