= Calvo (surname) =

Calvo is a Spanish, Italian and Sephardic surname, meaning bald, which was first used during the Middle Ages. It may refer to:

== Art ==
- Carmen Calvo (artist), Spanish conceptual artist
- Edmond-François Calvo, French comics artist
- Matilde Calvo Rodero, Spanish printmaker and bookbinder
- Pilar Calvo Rodero, Spanish sculptor, costume designer, and set designer

== Cinema ==
- A.D. Calvo, Argentine film producer
- Armando Calvo, Spanish film actor
- Juan Calvo (actor), Spanish film actor
- José Calvo, Spanish film actor
- Pablito Calvo, Spanish child actor

== Literature ==
- Agustín García Calvo, Spanish writer
- Bonifaci Calvo, Genoese troubadour
- Cesar Calvo, Peruvian writer
- César Calvo de Araujo, Peruvian writer and painter
- Emanuel Calvo, Italian poet and physician
- Javier Calvo (writer), Spanish writer
- Pedro Calvo Asensio, Spanish playwright
- Sabrina Calvo (born David), French writer

== Politics ==
- Bartolomé Calvo, Colombian politician
- Carmen Calvo Poyato, Spanish politician
- Horace L. Calvo, American politician and jurist
- Joaquín Bernardo Calvo Rosales, Costa Rican politician
- José Calvo Sotelo, Spanish politician
- Kristof Calvo, Belgian politician
- Leopoldo Calvo Sotelo, Spanish politician
- Mariano Enrique Calvo Cuellar, Bolivian politician
- Martín Calvo Encalada, Chilean politician
- Pilar Calvo (born 1963), Catalan politician

== Sports ==
- Alex Calvo García, Spanish football player
- Carlos Calvo Sobrado, Spanish football player
- Daniel Calvo (footballer) (born 1979), Belgian footballer
- Daniel Calvo Panizo, Spanish football player
- Diego Calvo, Costa Rican footballer
- Dionisio Calvo, Filipino basketball player
- Eugenio Baena Calvo (1953–2025), Colombian sports journalist
- Francisco Calvo, Costa Rican football player
- Gabriel Calvo (1955–2021), Spanish gymnast
- Jack Calvo, Cuban baseball player
- Javier Arley Reina Calvo, Colombian football player
- José Antonio García Calvo, Spanish football player
- José María Calvo, Argentine football player
- Juan Carlos Calvo, Uruguayan football player
- Luis Darío Calvo, Argentine football player
- Michael Calvo, Cuban triple jumper
- Miguel Palencia Calvo, Spanish football player
- Ricardo Calvo, Spanish chess player
- Toni Calvo, Spanish football player

== Others ==
- Adriana Calvo (1947–2010), Argentine physicist and activist
- Adrianne Calvo, American chef
- Emanuel Calvo, Italian physician and Neo-Hebraic poet
- Carlos Calvo (historian), Argentine historian
- Daniel Calvo (judge), Chilean judge
- Fortuna Calvo-Roth, American journalist
- Guillermo Calvo, Argentine-American economist
- Maria Rosa Calvo-Manzano, Spanish harp professor
- Marta Calvo (1994–2019), Spanish murder victim
- Michel-Dimitri Calvocoressi (1877–1944), music critic and musicologist
- Pedro Calvo, Cuban singer
- Rafael Calvo Serer, Spanish professor
- Randolph Roque Calvo, American Roman Catholic bishop
