= Ghesquière =

Ghesquière is a surname. Notable people with the surname include:

- Nicolas Ghesquière (born 1971), French fashion designer, creative director for Louis Vuitton
- Régis Ghesquière (1949–2015), Belgian decathlete
- Geoffrey Ghesquière (born 1989), Belgian footballer
- Ferdinand Ghesquière (1933–2021), Belgian politician, member of the Chamber of Representatives and the Senate
- Kris Ghesquière (born 1973), Belgian art dealer and designer, founder of Composition Gallery
