= Verdonk =

Verdonk and Verdonck are Dutch toponymic surnames. They are a contraction of van der Donk ("from the donk"), where "donk" was a name for sandy raised terrain in a swamp. The spelling Verdonk is more common in the Netherlands (2126 vs. 261 people in 2007), while Verdonck is more common in Belgium (4341 vs 118 people in 2008). Notable people with the surname include:

Verdonk

- Calvin Verdonk (born 1997), Indonesian footballer
- Eric Verdonk (1959–2020), New Zealand rower
- Lambert Verdonk (born 1944), Dutch footballer
- Rita Verdonk (born 1955), Dutch politician

Verdonck

- Cornelis Verdonck (1563–1625), Flemish composer
- Jan Verdonck (1546–1624), Flemish composer
- Maurice Verdonck (1873–?), Belgian rower
- Nico Verdonck (born 1985), Belgian racing driver
- Rudy Verdonck (born 1965), Belgian cyclist
- Sven Verdonck (born 1988), Belgian footballer

== See also ==
- Adriaen van der Donck (c.1618–1656), Dutch lawyer in New Netherland
- Sabrina van der Donk (born 1988), Dutch model
