= Mike Smet =

Belgian footballer (born 1991)

Personal information
- Date of birth: 6 March 1991 (age 35)
- Place of birth: Beveren, Belgium
- Position: Right-back

Team information
- Current team: Heist
- Number: 22

Youth career
- Germinal Beerschot

Senior career*
Years	Team	Apps	(Gls)
2007–2012	Germinal Beerschot	2	(0)
2012–2015	Eendracht Aalst	84	(1)
2015–2016	Beerschot Wilrijk	31	(0)
2016–2020	Dessel Sport	118	(8)
2020–2023	Dender	47	(1)
2023–	Heist	49	(3)
- * Club domestic league appearances and goals as of 7 May 2025

Mike Smet (born 6 March 1991) is a Belgian professional footballer who plays for Heist, as a right-back.

== Career ==
After playing for their youth team, Smet made his senior debut for Germinal Beerschot in the 2007–08 season.
