= Damien Lahaye =

Belgian footballer

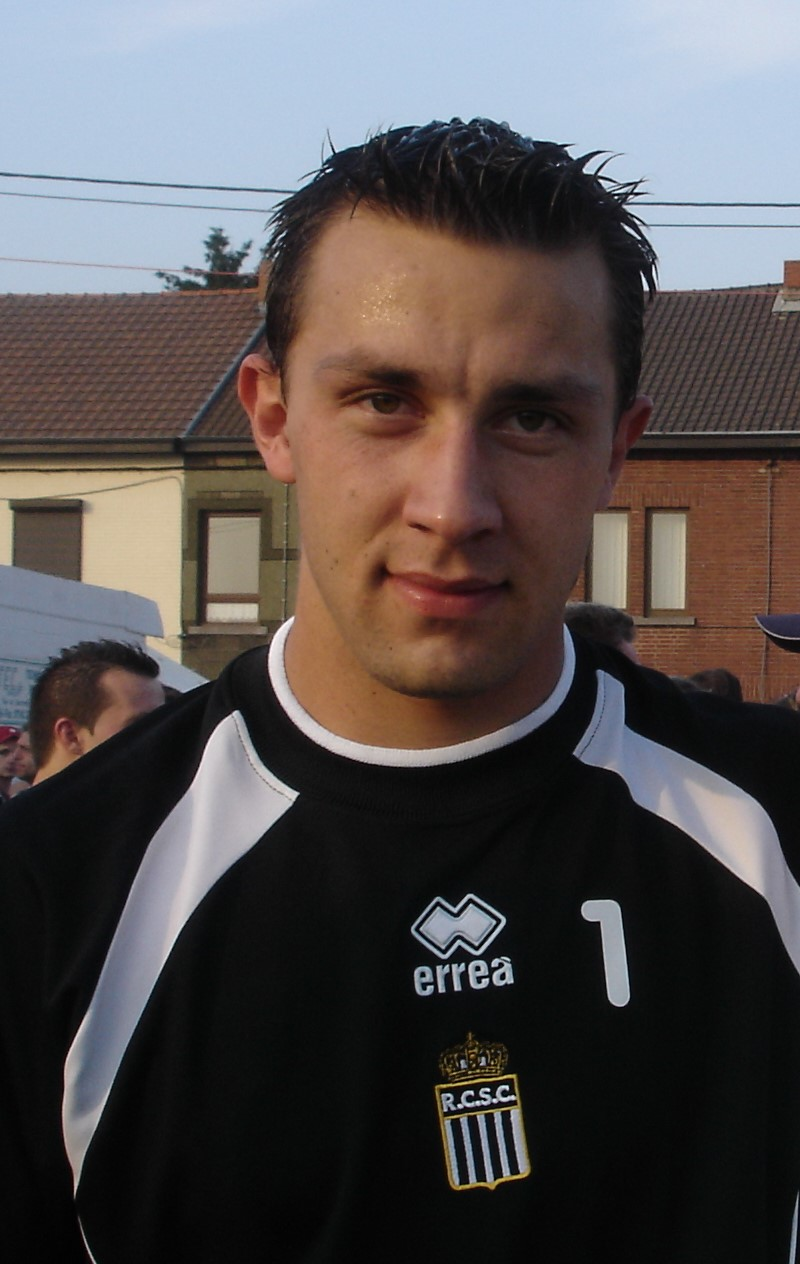

Personal information
- Full name: Damien Lahaye
- Date of birth: 30 January 1984 (age 42)
- Place of birth: Chimay, Belgium
- Height: 1.80 m (5 ft 11 in)
- Position: Goalkeeper

Team information
- Current team: Pont-à-Celles-Buzet
- Number: 28

Senior career*
Years	Team	Apps	(Gls)
2005–2010	Sporting Charleroi	6	(0)
2008–2009	→ Namur (loan)	18	(0)
2009	→ URLC (loan)		(0)
2009–2010	→ KV Kortrijk (loan)	1	(0)
2010–2011	KV Kortrijk	6	(0)
2011–2013	AFC Tubize	66	(0)
2013–2014	White Star Bruxelles	13	(0)
2014–2015	Mons	3	(0)
2015–2016	Meux		
2016	Heist	8	(0)
2018–2019	Rapid Symphorinois		
2019–2021	RUS Rebecq	44	(0)
2021–	Pont-à-Celles-Buzet		
- * Club domestic league appearances and goals as of 7 December 2015

Damien Lahaye (born 30 January 1984) is a Belgian footballer who plays as a goalkeeper for Pont-à-Celles-Buzet. Lahaye has appeared in six Belgian First Division matches for Charleroi.

== Career ==
After almost one and a half year without club, Lahaye joined RFC Rapid Symphorinois in January 2018. In February 2019, he joined R.U.S. Rebecquoise.
