= Norman Sylla =

French-born Guinean footballer (born 1982)

Personal information
- Full name: Norman Sylla
- Date of birth: 27 September 1982 (age 44)
- Place of birth: Paris, France
- Height: 6 ft 1 in (1.85 m)
- Position: Striker

Senior career*
| Years | Team | Apps | (Gls) |
| 2001–2002 | Oxford United | 0 | (0) |
| 2002 | Banbury United | 24 | (27) |
| 2002–2003 | Havant & Waterlooville | 4 | (0) |
| 2003 | Barnet | 4 | (0) |
| 2003–2004 | Tamworth | 25 | (4) |
| 2004–2005 | Redditch United | ? | (22) |
| 2005–2006 | Acharnaikos | | |
| 2006–2007 | Ronse | 32 | (15) |
| 2007–2009 | Dender | 60 | (15) |
| 2009–2010 | Denizlispor | 1 | (0) |
| 2010–2013 | Tubize | 65 | (31) |
| 2014 | Dender | 7 | (1) |
| 2014–2015 | KFC Duffel | 10 | (1) |

International career
| 2007–2013 | Guinea | 31 | (12) |
- * Club domestic league appearances and goals

Norman Sylla (born 27 September 1982) is a Guinean retired football striker.

== Career ==
=== Club career ===
Prior to playing for the Belgian sides Ronse and Dender, Sylla played for the English side Banbury United and a host of other English non-league teams, including legendary status at his one season at Redditch United where he scored 22 goals. He had agreed a contract to come back for the following season, but didn't return from holiday and never came back to play for Redditch United again. He has been capped 31 times for his country.

== Personal life ==
Sylla is the brother-in-law of Olivier Dacourt.
