= Olivier Claessens =

Belgian footballer

Personal information
- Date of birth: 22 December 1988 (age 37)
- Place of birth: Edegem, Belgium
- Height: 1.84 m (6 ft 0 in)
- Position: Forward

Team information
- Current team: KFC Baal

Youth career
- 1994–2000: Kontich FC
- 2000–2004: TSV Lyra
- 2004–2007: Antwerp
- 2007–2008: Willem II

Senior career*
Years	Team	Apps	(Gls)
2008–2009	RC Mechelen	30	(9)
2009–2010	Cercle Brugge	15	(0)
2010–2011	FCV Dender EH	32	(8)
2011–2012	Sint-Niklaas	17	(2)
2012–2013	KSC Grimbergen	23	(6)
2013–2015	K. Berchem Sport	59	(7)
2015–2016	KAC Betekom	5	(3)
2016–2017	KFC Herent		
2017–2018	KFC Kontich		
2018–2020	KFC Herent		
2020–	KFC Baal		
- * Club domestic league appearances and goals as of 15 October 2015 (UTC)

Olivier Claessens (born 22 December 1988 in Edegem) is a Belgian former professional football player (currently playing as amateur). His position on the field is forward and he is currently under contract with Belgian side KFC Baal from the Belgian Provincial Leagues.

Claessens was part of the starting eleven in RC Mechelen's cup successes against Germinal Beerschot and Zulte Waregem. Against Germinal Beerschot, Claessens missed an open goal from a tight angle. In the confrontation with Zulte Waregem, he saw a valid goal disallowed.
