= Emanuel Calvo =

- Born: Thessaloniki, Greece
- Occupation: Physician

Emanuel Calvo (late-seventeenth century - before 1772) was an Italian physician and Neo-Hebraic poet.

He was born at Thessaloniki. In early youth he went to Livorno with his learned father, Raphael Calvo, and on October 23, 1724, he graduated as a doctor in Padua. Calvo practiced medicine with considerable success at Livorno, but inclined to the Kabbala toward the end of his life. Several of Calvo's poems are included in A.B. Piperno's collection Ḳol 'Ugab, Livorno, 1846. He was an intimate friend of the poet Abraham Isaac Castello and of Moses Hayyim Luzzatto, who wrote a eulogy of him in a Hebrew poem after his graduation, and subsequently corresponded with him. When Calvo died Joseph ben David wrote an elegy, which is published in his Yeḳara de-Shakbe, 1774.
