= Fortuna Calvo-Roth =

Fortuna Calvo-Roth (born 1934) is an American journalist, professor and businesswoman. She was born in Paris to Sephardic Jewish parents, and raised in Lima, Peru.

She emigrated to the United States in 1952 and attended the University of Missouri, majoring in journalism. She returned to Peru to begin a writing career. She was hired as a copy editor at La Prensa, which had been modeled on the New York Herald Tribune. but after three days was informed by the editor-in-chief that he would not employ women in the newsroom. He offered her a job on the society page but she declined.

A year later she got a job at Vision, a Latin American magazine, as the New York correspondent for the Brazil edition. On one assignment she interviewed the editor who had fired her who had become Peru's finance minister. He failed to recognize her, but when he asked her why she was not working in her native country (Peru), she quickly refreshed his memory. She remained at Vision for 12 years, rising to editor-in-chief of the Spanish-language edition, but left in 1969, in part to raise her children.

She attended New York University's School of the Arts, studying film, television and radio. She also studied acting with Stella Adler, and played "Kitty Duval" in William Saroyan's The Time of Your Life.

In 2018 she had a lead role in the play Wait/Espera by Veronica Picone and Jenifer Badamo at the Hudson Guild Theater, NYC, 2018. She had a guest role in two episodes of the TV series The Blacklist. She has also acted in a number of commercials, among them for Target, IKEA, Ridgewood Savings Bank, Cheerios.

She taught politics at NYU and Hofstra through the 1980s and also partnered to form Lima's Channel 2 and Vista, a magazine supplement for Latinos in the U.S. She also co-created, with her son, Stephen, Coral Communications Group, which produces the Nueva Onda audio book label.

== Affiliations ==
- Member, SAG-AFTRA.
- Former Foundation Board of The Graduate Center at CUNY.
- Former Advisory Board of CUNY's Center for Latin American, Caribbean, and Latino Studies.
- Former President of the New York chapter of Women in Communications.
- Member, The Jury Project, 1994.

== Author ==
- What! No Yiddish?, in the anthology "Taking Root. The Lives of Jewish Women in Latin America." (Marjorie Agosin, ed., Ohio University Press).

== Awards ==
- Earphones Award from AudioFile magazine for Nueva Onda's “La Sombra de un Pájaro”, 2011
- Medal of Honor, University of Missouri School of Journalism, 2018
- Woman of Distinction, NY State Senate, 2014
- Named among 50 Outstanding Latinas in the U.S. by El Diario-La Prensa, 2002

== Sources ==
- New York Daily News, "Big Town Big Dreams", p. 28, June 6, 2007.
- El Diario-La Prensa, March 20, 2002
- NYPL Digital Collections, 1992
- AudioFile magazine, Aug-Sept. 2011
- Journal of Peruvian Studies, Academic Publishing Wiki (review)
- IMDb
