= Maxime Brillault =

French football defender (born 1983)

Personal information
- Date of birth: 25 April 1983 (age 43)
- Place of birth: Tours, France
- Height: 1.88 m (6 ft 2 in)
- Position: Defender

Youth career
- 1998–2000: Stade Rennais

Senior career*
Years	Team	Apps	(Gls)
2000–2004	Chamois Niortais	0	(0)
2004–2006	Orléans	66	(4)
2006–2008	Libourne	53	(4)
2008–2009	Amiens	23	(0)
2009–2011	Charleroi	51	(1)
2011–2012	Vannes	47	(2)
2012–2015	Orléans	89	(7)
2015–2016	Brest	6	(0)
2016–2017	Boulogne	20	(0)
- * Club domestic league appearances and goals as of 13:22, 3 February 2021 (UTC)

Maxime Brillault (born 25 April 1983) is a French football defender who most recently played for Boulogne.

Brillault played professional in France in Ligue 2 with FC Libourne Saint-Seurin, Amiens SC, Vannes OC and Stade Brestois 29, and in Belgium with Royal Charleroi.
