= Kristof Van Hout =

Belgian footballer

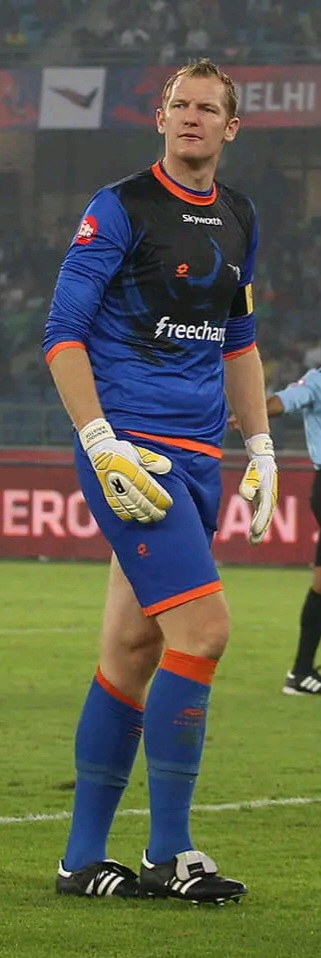

Personal information
- Date of birth: 9 February 1987 (age 39)
- Place of birth: Lommel, Belgium
- Height: 2.08 m (6 ft 10 in)
- Position: Goalkeeper

Youth career
- 1992–2003: Lommel
- 2003–2004: Geel
- 2004–2006: Willem II

Senior career*
Years	Team	Apps	(Gls)
2006–2007	Willem II	0	(0)
2007–2009	Kortrijk	4	(0)
2009–2011	Standard Liège	9	(0)
2011–2012	Kortrijk	32	(0)
2012–2014	Genk	25	(0)
2014–2015	Delhi Dynamos	14	(0)
2015–2022	Westerlo	16	(0)
2022–2023	Lommel	1	(0)
- * Club domestic league appearances and goals

Kristof Van Hout (born 9 February 1987) is a Belgian former professional footballer who played as a goalkeeper. With a height of 2.08 metres, he is considered one of the tallest footballers in history.

== Career ==
Van Hout joined Willem II in 2004 from Verbroedering Geel as a youth player. On 6 August 2009, Standard Liège signed him from Kortrijk on a three-year deal. On 11 June 2011, he returned to Kortrijk on a one-year contract.

On 23 May 2022, Van Hout signed a one-season contract with Lommel.

== Honours ==
Genk

- Belgian Cup: 2012–13
