= Manu Micó =

Spanish footballer

Personal information
- Full name: Manuel Micó Yébana
- Date of birth: 18 July 1986 (age 40)
- Place of birth: Valencia, Spain
- Height: 1.79 m (5 ft 10 in)
- Position: Left back

Youth career
- Torre Levante
- 2004–2005: Atlético Madrid

Senior career*
Years	Team	Apps	(Gls)
2005–2006	Novelda		
2006–2007	Benidorm B		
2007–2009	Valencia B	25	(1)
2009	Mouscron	6	(0)
2010–2011	Orihuela	28	(2)
2011–2012	Recreativo	0	(0)
2013	Ontinyent	11	(0)
2013–2014	Atlético Saguntino	9	(0)
2014	Écija	6	(0)
2014	Alzira	4	(0)
2014–2015	Acero	7	(0)

Managerial career
- 2018: Vilamarxant
- * Club domestic league appearances and goals

Manuel 'Manu' Micó Yébana (born 18 July 1986 in Valencia) is a Spanish retired footballer who played as a left back.
