= Stéphane Demets =

Belgian football manager and former player

Personal information
- Date of birth: 26 December 1976 (age 49)
- Place of birth: Brussels, Belgium
- Height: 1.96 m (6 ft 5 in)
- Position: Defender

Team information
- Current team: KSK Heist (Manager)

Youth career
- 1983–1987: Zellik Sport
- 1987–1990: SC Anderlecht
- 1990–1991: HO Merchtem
- 1991–1994: R.W.D. Molenbeek

Senior career*
Years	Team	Apps	(Gls)
1994–1998	RWD Molenbeek	43	(1)
1998–1999	RWDM Brussels FC	20	(1)
1999–2004	KSK Beveren	88	(1)
2004–2009	KV Kortrijk	103	(2)

Managerial career
- 2010–2011: K. Wolvertem SC (U-19)
- 2010–2011: K. Wolvertem SC (assistant)
- 2011–2012: AFC Tubize II
- 2012–2014: RAEC Mons (assistant)
- 2014: FCV Dender EH
- 2015–XXXX: White Star Bruxelles (assistant)
- 2017–2019: Royal Stade Waremmien
- 2019–2022: KSK Heist
- 2022-2022: K Rupel Boom FC
- * Club domestic league appearances and goals

Stéphane Demets (born 26 December 1976 in Brussels) is a Belgian football manager and former defender. He is currently the manager of K Rupel Boom FC.

== Career ==
He joined K.S.K. Beveren in 1999, he came from FC Molenbeek Brussels Strombeek. After four years at K.S.K. Beveren he signed with K.V. Kortrijk.

== Coaching career ==
In 2009, he played his last season and was hired as a scout at RAEC Mons. From 2010 to 2011, he worked for K. Wolvertem SC as the manager of their U-19 squad and also assisting the first team senior squad. In the 2011/12 season, he was the manager of AFC Tubize's reserve team.

In 2012, he returned to RAEC Mons and was working as an assistant manager until the end of the 2013/14 season. In July 2014, he was appointed as manager of FCV Dender EH, which he only was for three months. In 2015 he became the assistant manager of White Star Bruxelles.

On 7 December 2017, Demets was appointed as manager of Stade Waremmien FC. In February 2019, Demets launched an ultimatum to the management of the club, because no one in the club had been paid their salary for three months. Nothing changed, and Demets decided to resign on 23 February 2019.

On 11 March 2019 it was announced that Demets would become the manager of K.S.K. Heist for the 2019/20 season.

On 21 May 2022 it was announced that Stephane Demets would become the manager of K Rupel Boom FC. for the 2022/2023 season.
