= Janis Coppin =

Belgian footballer

Personal information
- Date of birth: 11 May 1988 (age 38)
- Place of birth: Belgium
- Height: 1.83 m (6 ft 0 in)
- Position: Forward

Team information
- Current team: KM Torhout

Youth career
- –2006: Germinal Beerschot
- 2006–2007: Roeselare

Senior career*
Years	Team	Apps	(Gls)
2007–2009	Zulte Waregem	19	(3)
2009–2010	Mons	22	(4)
2010–2013	Dender EH	90	(27)
2013–2015	KM Torhout	64	(29)
2015–2016	Coxyde	24	(1)
2016–2017	Gullegem		
2017–2018	KM Torhout		
2018–2019	Mandel United		
2019–	KM Torhout		

International career
2009	Belgium U21	1	(0)
- * Club domestic league appearances and goals as of 19:26, 22 October 2019 (UTC)

Janis Coppin (born 11 May 1988) is a Belgian professional football striker who plays for KM Torhout in the Belgian Second Division. From 2007 to 2009 he played for Zulte Waregem, before moving to Mons.
