= Maria Rosa Calvo-Manzano =

Madrid Harpist and Professor

Maria Rosa Calvo-Manzano (born 16 February 1946 in Madrid) is a harp professor at the Royal Superior Music Conservatory of Madrid (Real Conservatorio Superior de Música de Madrid). She is also one of the founding members of the RTVE Orchestra. She has been credited with the creation of the Modern Spanish Harp School (Moderna Escuela Española de Arpa).

== Life ==
Born in Madrid, she began studying music at the age of four. At six years old, she joined the city’s Real Conservatorio Superior de Música to study harp, piano and ballet. After quickly building a career as a soloist, winning many awards and distinctions and touring cities such as Sienna and Paris, she became a founding member of the Radio Televisión Española Symphony Orchestra.

At just 18 years old, she became the Chair Professor of Harp at Madrid’s Real Conservatorio Superior de Música, the youngest Chair Professor in the history of music in Spain, with her field of work now including performance, teaching, and research.

== Education ==
Calvo-Manzano graduated from the Royal Superior Music Conservatory of Madrid with an "Extraordinary Conservatory Degree Achievement" recognition. She has a Masters in Philosophy and Human Arts, a PhD in Architecture from the Department of Architectural Graphical Ideation at the Universidad Politécnica de Madrid, and a second PhD in History from the Department of History and Thought at the University San Pablo-CEU of Madrid.

== Career ==
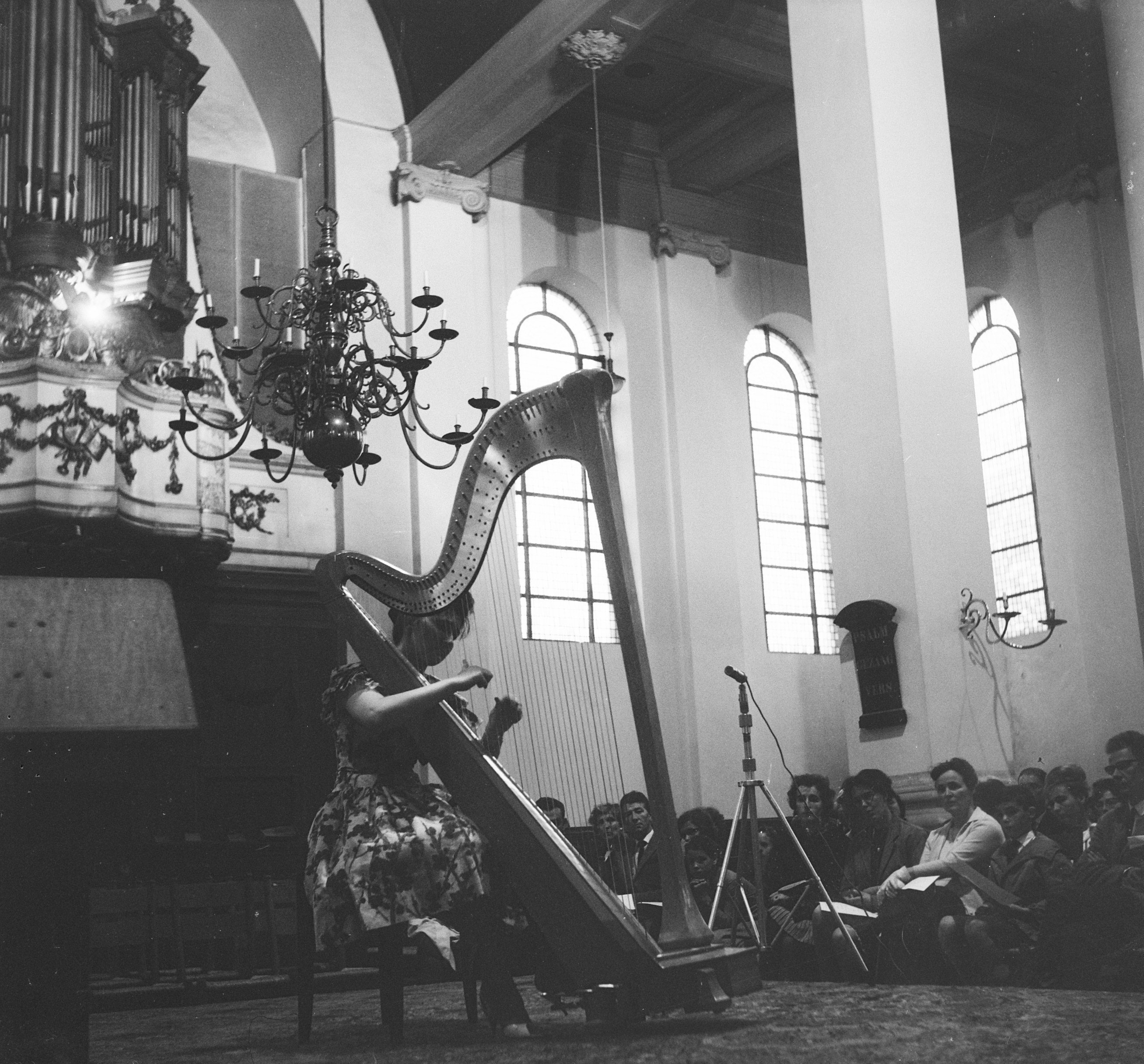
Maria Rosa Calvo-Manzano in 1963 (Nieuwe Kerk in Haarlem, Netherlands)

In 1976, her debut at Carnegie Hall in New York receiving positive reviews from critics, and the New York Times recognized her as a ground-breaking harpist who was revolutionizing contemporary harp with her sound and technique. Following her debut concert, she was named by the City of New York as the Best Young Foreign Artist of the Year.

Calvo-Manzano has written essays about pedagogy, historiography, and musicology. She has concentrated her efforts on the critical study of Spanish works, particularly on those written for harp, and has researched manuscripts with important paleographic contributions. Her books have been published by ARLU publications, a branch of Association Arpista Ludovido (Ludovido Harpist Association). She has published in specialized magazines and has collaborated in the publishing of music dictionaries and reference books on music history.

In addition, Calvo-Manzano has recorded several albums, mostly dealing with Spanish music and a style known as "ludoviquiano". These albums were produced with the purpose of remembering the legendary figure of Ludovico, a harpist in the High Renaissance period and Chamber Musician to the Catholic Monarchs. Calvo-Manzano has published editions of critical studies on works by Spanish composers included in her repertoire.

Calvo-Manzano created a didactic technique, known as the ARLU Technique, which is used in courses at the Universidad Complutense de Madrid (Madrid Complutense University) and at the RCSM de Madrid. Many music school and conservatory professors in Spain are former students of Calvo-Manzano, and her foreign students have spread her harp and didactic theories. The method consists of understanding the instrument in more than simply musical terms. Her search to equip the harp with a technique that is not only dynamic but also expressive in the application of musical effects with a purist approach, appropriate to the era's tendencies and aesthetics, has dubbed her a true innovator in harp technique. She is recognized as the founder of the modern Spanish school of harp. She has also been frequently visited by foreign students who have been attracted by her achievements as a concert harpist and scholar. In many cases, her students pursue their PhD under her guidance.

In 1988, the Ludovico Harpist Association was founded to safeguard the Spanish harp heritage and to celebrate Ludovico. In 1993, the association began the Harpist Ludovico International Harp Competition (Concurso Internacional de Arpa Arpista Ludovico) with the objective of encouraging talented young harpists. This competition has become one of the most important in the world with a simultaneous multicultural festival taking place in association with the competition. The competition takes place at the royal site of "Real Sitio de San Lorenzo de El Escorial" every three years with Calvo-Manzano as the main patron.

In 2000, she donated her personal harp heritage collection, which included historical instruments and a library of specialized documents, to the foundation with the purpose of providing the coming generations with a document base of instrumental organology and assets with more than 10,000 volumes related to art, history, philosophy, and music.

She has also started the Spanish Chamber Music Group "Ludovico Harpist" which carries out the task of releasing works of Spanish chamber music, which are often dedicated to Calvo-Manzano, and published and recorded by ARLU Association.

She has been appointed a member of the Academy of Fines Arts and Historic Sciences of Spain. She has also been recognized with numerous national and international prizes and decorated by the King of Spain with "El Lazo de Isabel la Católica" and "La Encomienda de Alfonso X el Sabio".
