= Sergio Hellings =

Dutch footballer (born 1984)

Personal information
- Full name: Sergio Hellings
- Date of birth: 11 October 1984 (age 42)
- Place of birth: Amsterdam, Netherlands
- Height: 1.85 m (6 ft 1 in)
- Position: Central midfielder

Youth career
- 1990-1992: Bijlmer
- 1992-2002: Ajax

Senior career*
| Years | Team | Apps | (Gls) |
| 2002–2005 | Anderlecht | 0 | (0) |
| 2005–2006 | Heracles | 43 | (4) |
| 2006–2007 | AGOVV | 25 | (6) |
| 2007–2008 | Leicester City | 0 | (0) |
| 2008–2009 | Westerlo | 0 | (0) |
| 2009–2010 | Roeselare | 14 | (0) |

International career
| 2000–2001 | Netherlands U17 | 8 | (2) |
| 2001–2003 | Netherlands U19 | 6 | (1) |
- * Club domestic league appearances and goals as of 21 August 2009

Sergio Hellings (born 11 October 1984) is a Dutch retired footballer who played as a midfielder.

== Career ==
A natural defender, Hellings was snapped up by Ajax at an early age, and was nurtured through the Dutch side's world-famous youth system as one of the biggest talents. He has represented his country at all youth levels up to Under-21 next to now top players, Nigel de Jong, Wesley Sneijder, Arjen Robben and John Heitinga. Hellings didn't wait to play for the first team, so he joined Belgian side Anderlecht for €2 million on 11 October 2002, signing a five-year contract. He only made it to 7 pre-season friendlies for Anderlecht. Middlesbrough originally wanted to sign Hellings, but the clubs could agree on the transfer fee. Leeds United were also interested in signing Hellings, but the club took too long in deciding to pursue a deal.

In the 2004–05 winter break he returned to the Netherlands and joined Heracles Almelo in the Eerste Divisie, with whom he won promotion to the Eredivisie. The next season, he helped Heracles Almelo to remain in the Eredivisie, and made it to the Netherlands national under-21 football team. He moved back to the Eerste Divisie himself when he joined AGOVV Apeldoorn, making 25 appearances.

Hellings was signed by Leicester City on 19 June 2007 under manager Martin Allen, Manager Martin Allen that signed Hellings lasted for only 4 months, so he was transfer listed by Ian Holloway on 23 December. He came close to making his senior debut against Chelsea in a League Cup match on 31 October, but was left on the substitute bench as Leicester lost 4–3. He has recently been on trial at Luton town and scored twice for their reserves. Hellings didn't got a chance due to manager switches on short terms and on 30 July 2008 he parted company with Leicester City by mutual consent, having secured a two-year deal (with an option of a third year) at Belgian Jupiler League side Westerlo two days earlier. As he did not get any playing time with both Leicester and Westerlo, Hellings moved to KSV Roeselare in summer 2009.

== International career ==
Hellings played 8 games for the Netherlands national under-17 football team and 6 for the U19s.

== Coaching ==
Since leaving Westerlo, unable to find another club Hellings has been volunteering in a coaching capacity at Ajax Amsterdam.

== Honours ==
Heracles Almelo

- Winner
  - Eerste Divisie: 2004/05
