= Bertrand Laquait =

French footballer (born 1977)

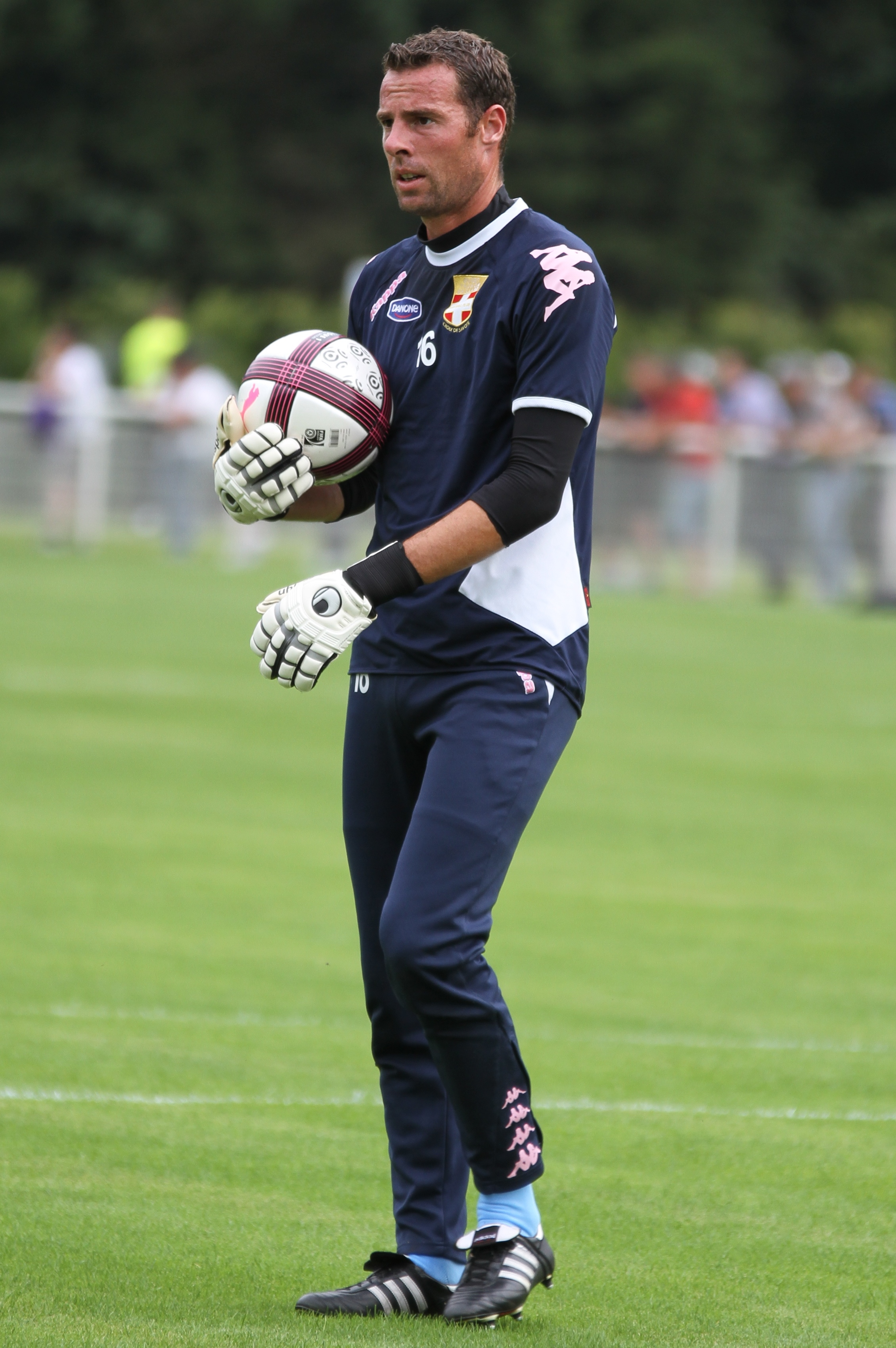
- Laquait training with Évian in 2011

Personal information
- Full name: Bertrand Marcel Laquait
- Date of birth: 13 April 1977 (age 49)
- Place of birth: Vichy, France
- Height: 1.85 m (6 ft 1 in)
- Position: Goalkeeper

Youth career
- ASPTT Vichy
- RC Vichy
- 1990–1992: Sochaux
- 1992–1997: Nancy

Senior career*
Years	Team	Apps	(Gls)
1997–2002	Nancy	94	(0)
2002–2009	Charleroi	117	(1)
2006–2007	→ Recreativo (loan)	9	(0)
2009–2014	Évian	116	(0)
2014–2015	Valenciennes	20	(0)
Total		356	(1)
- * Club domestic league appearances and goals

Bertrand Marcel Laquait (born 13 April 1977) is a French retired professional footballer who played as a goalkeeper.

== Club career ==
Born in Vichy, Laquait started his professional career with AS Nancy in Ligue 2, appearing in only two matches in his first year in a final promotion to Ligue 1 and adding five the next season. He was first-choice the following two campaigns, the last one spent in the second division.

In summer 2002, Laquait joined R. Charleroi S.C. in Belgium, starting for the Zèbres from his second season onwards. On 21 December 2003 he scored from his goal against R.A.E.C. Mons, and was nominated for the campaign's Belgian Goalkeeper of the Year award, eventually losing to Silvio Proto of R.A.A. Louviéroise.

Laquait spent 2006–07 on loan to Recreativo de Huelva in Spain, making his La Liga debut on 14 October 2006 in a 1–2 away loss against Atlético Madrid (45 minutes played). He played understudy to Javier López Vallejo during the season, and failed to appear in the league for Charleroi upon his return, leaving the club in June 2009.

Aged 32, Laquait returned to his country and signed for Thonon Évian F.C. of Championnat National, being first-choice as the team achieved two consecutive promotions. On 1 October 2011 he played his first match in the top flight in more than 11 years, a 1–1 draw at his first professional team Nancy where he was named player of the match.
