= Alexandre Jansen Da Silva =

Belgian footballer

Personal information
- Date of birth: 16 January 1987 (age 39)
- Place of birth: Waregem, Belgium
- Height: 1.87 m (6 ft 2 in)
- Position: Defender

Team information
- Current team: Mons

Youth career
- Zulte Waregem

Senior career*
Years	Team	Apps	(Gls)
2007–2008	Club Brugge	1	(0)
2008–2009	Standard Liège	1	(0)
2009–2012	Tubize	58	(1)
2013	Oudenaarde	3	(0)
2013–2014	Turnhout	26	(4)
2014–2015	Cappellen	25	(0)
2015–2016	Houtvenne		
2016	Nõmme Kalju	3	(0)
2017	KVK Westhoek		
2017–2018	Houtvenne		
2018–2019	Sint-Niklaas		
2019–2020	KVK Westhoek	19	(2)
2020–	Mons		
- * Club domestic league appearances and goals as of 18:28, 16 December 2019 (UTC)

Alexandre Jansen Da Silva (born 16 January 1987) is a Belgian professional footballer who plays as a centre-back for Renaissance Mons 44.

== Career ==
Jansen Da Silva and his one-year younger brother Alandson were born in West Flanders to Brazilian parents. Their father Sérgio da Silva played in the late 1980s for KSV Waregem and KRC Harelbeke. Alexandre made his debut at the highest level of Belgian football as a replacement for Brian Priske at Club Brugge. He played his first match for Standard Liège against FCV Dender one day after his 22nd birthday, when he achieved a spot in the starting eleven.
