= Daniel Calvo (judge) =

Chilean judge (born c. 1958)

Daniel Calvo Flores (born c.1958) is a former Santiago Court of Appeals judge of the Republic of Chile. At the moment he is a 4º judicial attorney (Spanish: Fiscal Judicial) in the Santiago Court of Appeals.

The privately owned TV station Chilevisión aired a broadcast of film taken with a hidden camera of Calvo stating that he frequented a gay sauna.
