= Peter Mollez =

Belgian footballer

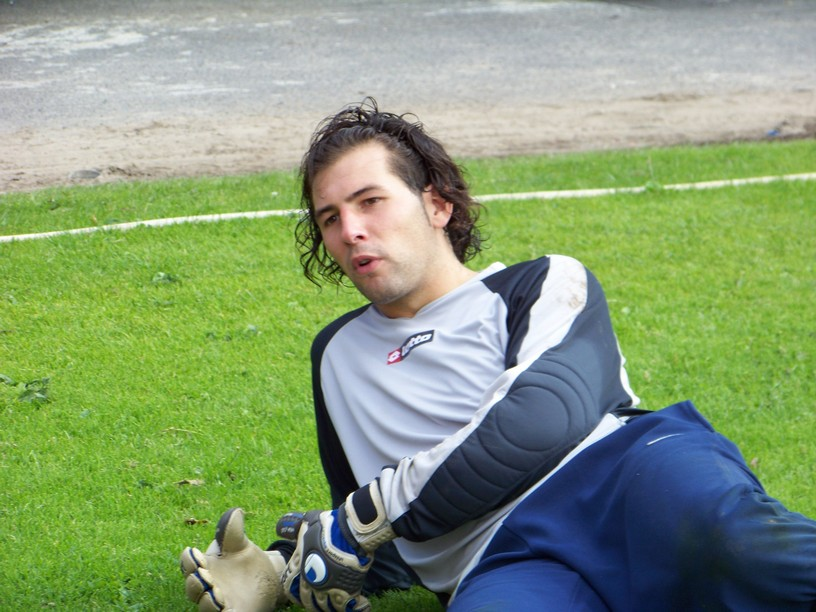

Personal information
- Date of birth: 23 September 1983 (age 43)
- Place of birth: Poperinge, Belgium
- Position: Goalkeeper

Youth career
- 1989–1993: VK Ieper
- 1993–1997: KV Kortrijk
- 1997–2003: Club Brugge

Senior career*
Years	Team	Apps	(Gls)
2003–2005	Club Brugge	0	(0)
2004–2005	→Cercle Brugge (loan)	25	(0)
2005	AA Gent	1	(0)
2006–2009	KV Kortrijk	93	(0)
2009–2010	FCV Dender	29	(0)

International career^{‡}
	Belgium	0	(0)
- * Club domestic league appearances and goals as of 16 May 2009 ‡ National team caps and goals as of 16 May 2008

Peter Mollez (born 23 September 1983 in Poperinge) is a Belgian football goalkeeper.

== Career ==
Mollez was a promising youngster. He was even offered a test period at Arsenal, but Club Brugge refused that. However, Mollez never achieved his break-through at Club, and he was eventually loaned to Cercle Brugge. Quite ironically, Mollez made his début at the highest level of Belgian football with Cercle Brugge in a match against Club Brugge. Mollez had to replace the red carded Ricky Begeyn. Cercle lost the match 5–0.

Mollez finally became a first team regular with KV Kortrijk in second division as KV Kortrijk became Second Division champions.
