= Izzet Akgül =

Belgian footballer

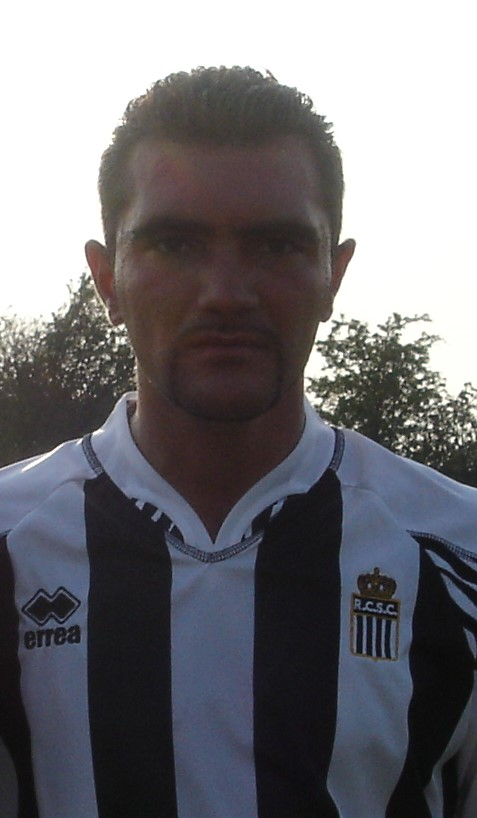

Personal information
- Date of birth: 28 January 1982 (age 44)
- Place of birth: Belgium
- Position: Forward

Senior career*
Years	Team	Apps	(Gls)
–2002	Galatasaray S.K.	0	(0)
2002	FC Sion	8	(1)
2002–2003	Yıldırım Bosna S.K.	1	(0)
2003–2004	Union Royale Namur		
2004–2007	R. Charleroi S.C.	54	(19)
2007–2008	K.S.V. Roeselare	18	(4)
2008–2010	Denizlispor	23	(4)
2010–2011	Samsunspor	1	(0)
2011–2012	A.F.C. Tubize	2	(0)
2012–2013	Union Royale Namur		
2013–2015	Gümüşhanespor	34	(13)
2015–2016	Pazarspor	9	(0)
2016–2017	Couvin-Mariembourg		
2017–2018	CS Wépionnais		
2020–2021	Union Namur B		
- * Club domestic league appearances and goals

Izzet Akgül (born 28 January 1982 in Belgium) is a Belgian footballer.

== Personal life ==
Akgül is of Turkish descent.
