= Tiago Ronaldo =

Portuguese footballer (born 1988)

Ronaldo
Personal information
- Full name: Tiago Alexandre Carvalho Gonçalves
- Date of birth: 28 December 1988 (age 37)
- Place of birth: Loures, Portugal
- Height: 1.78 m (5 ft 10 in)
- Position: Midfielder

Team information
- Current team: Pevidém

Youth career
- 1997–2005: Loures
- 2005–2007: Vitória Guimarães

Senior career*
| Years | Team | Apps | (Gls) |
| 2007−2009 | Vitória Guimarães | 0 | (0) |
| 2009−2010 | Standard Liège | 0 | (0) |
| 2010−2011 | Moreirense | 5 | (0) |
| 2011−2012 | Juventude Évora | 29 | (7) |
| 2012−2013 | Tourizense | 24 | (3) |
| 2013−2014 | Vizela | 31 | (5) |
| 2014−2016 | Santa Clara | 75 | (1) |
| 2016−2017 | Vizela | 26 | (2) |
| 2017−2019 | Penafiel | 42 | (1) |
| 2019−2020 | Trofense | 21 | (1) |
| 2020− | Pevidém | 149 | (10) |
- * Club domestic league appearances and goals as of 17:57, 4 August 2026 (UTC)

Tiago Alexandre Carvalho Gonçalves (born 28 December 1988), commonly known as Ronaldo, is a Portuguese professional footballer who plays as a midfielder for Pevidém.

== Club career ==
Born in Loures, Lisbon metropolitan area, Ronaldo graduated from Vitória de Guimarães' youth academy for the 2007–08 season, as the Minho club had just returned to the Primeira Liga. His competitive input with the first team consisted of two substitute appearances, against C.F. União de Lamas in the Taça de Portugal (4–2 home win) on 19 October 2008 and against S.C. Olhanense in the Taça da Liga the following 18 January (3–0 victory, also at the Estádio D. Afonso Henriques).

On 2 July 2009, Ronaldo signed with Belgium's Standard Liège on a two-year deal. The following year, without having featured in the country's Belgian Pro League, he returned to Portugal and joined Moreirense F.C. of the Segunda Liga. He made his professional league debut on 29 August 2010, playing seven minutes in a 1–0 home win over G.D. Estoril Praia.

Ronaldo continued his career in the third division in the following years, representing Juventude Sport Clube (in Évora), G.D. Tourizense and F.C. Vizela. He moved to C.D. Santa Clara in the second tier for the 2014–15 campaign, joining Vizela in the same league two years later.
