= Alandson Jansen Da Silva =

Belgian footballer

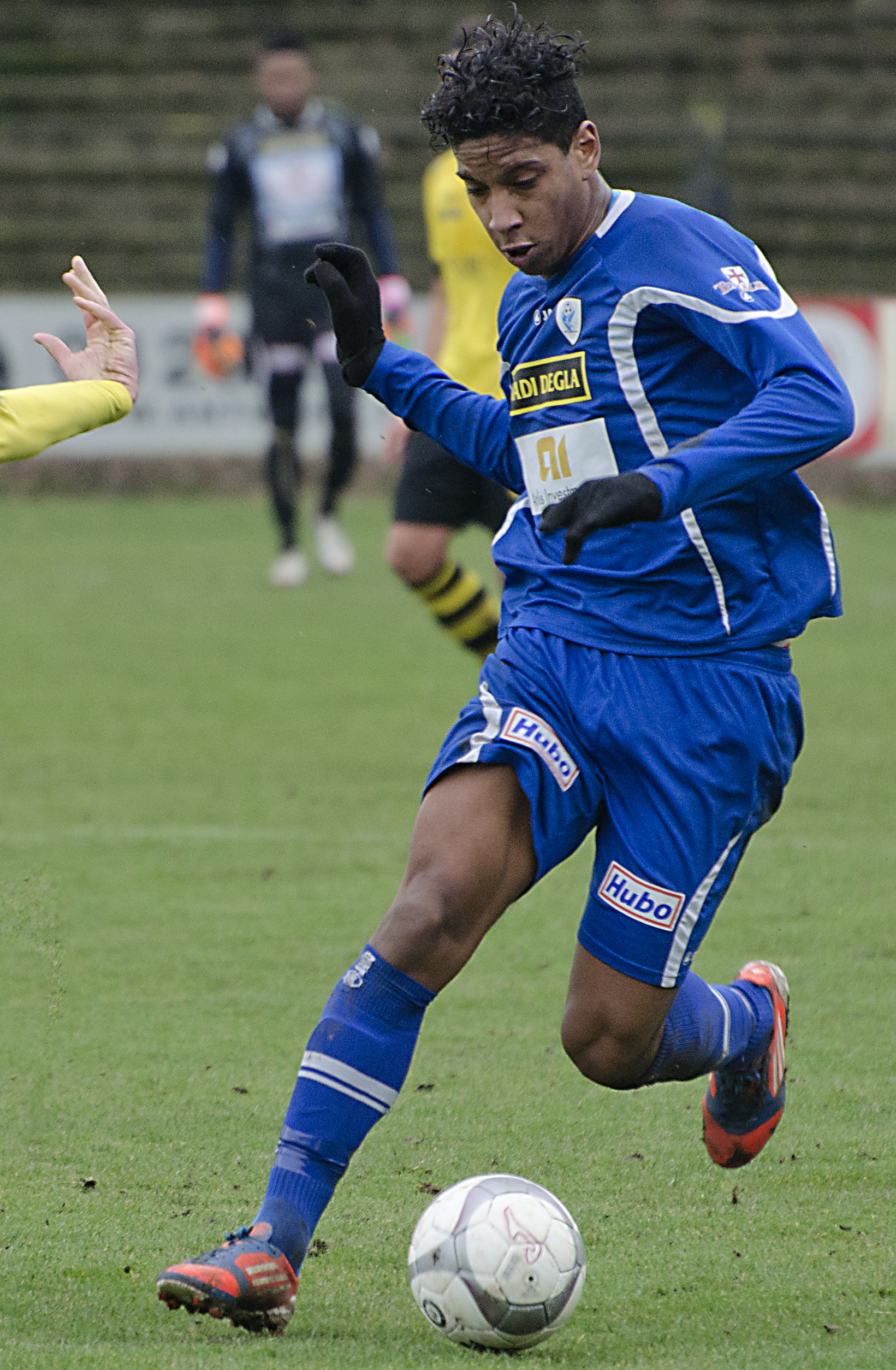

Personal information
- Full name: Alandson Jansen da Silva
- Date of birth: 4 October 1988 (age 38)
- Place of birth: Torhout, Belgium
- Position: Forward

Team information
- Current team: Gent-Zeehaven
- Number: 11

Youth career
- Club Brugge

Senior career*
Years	Team	Apps	(Gls)
2007–2008	Club Brugge	0	(0)
2008–2009	Standard Liège	0	(0)
2009–2011	AFC Tubize	29	(6)
2011–2012	AGOVV Apeldoorn	14	(0)
2012	Floriana	9	(1)
2012–2013	KVV Coxyde	7	(1)
2013–2014	KV Turnhout	22	(3)
2015–	Gent-Zeehaven	30	(9)
- * Club domestic league appearances and goals as of 29 December 2015

Alandson Jansen Da Silva (born 4 October 1988) is a Belgian professional footballer who plays for Gent-Zeehaven.

== Career ==
Jansen Da Silva and his one-year older brother Alexandre have Brazilian parents but grew up in Waregem, West Flanders. Alandson made his professional debut for AGOVV Apeldoorn in the 2011–12 season.
