= Sander Debroux =

Belgian footballer

Personal information
- Date of birth: 23 September 1982 (age 44)
- Place of birth: Etterbeek, Belgium
- Height: 1.79 m (5 ft 10 in)
- Position: Midfielder

Youth career
- 1989–95: Tempo Overijse
- 1995–2000: RWDM

Senior career*
Years	Team	Apps	(Gls)
2000–2002	ZD Oud-Heverlee		
2002–2004	OH Leuven		
2004–2009	Sint-Truiden		
2009–2010	OH Leuven		
2010–2013	Tempo Overijse		
- * Club domestic league appearances and goals

Sander Debroux (born 23 September 1982 in Etterbeek) is a Belgian retired footballer.

Between 2004 and 2009, Debroux played five seasons for Sint-Truiden, the first four of which were in the Belgian First Division. He played 94 matches at the highest level, scoring 4 goals. Thereafter, he moved back to OH Leuven at the beginning of the 2009–10 season and in the 2010–11 season, he moved to Tempo Overijse.
