= Baba Iddi =

Ghanaian football striker (born 1982)

Personal information
- Date of birth: July 6, 1982 (age 44)
- Place of birth: Kumasi, Ghana
- Height: 1.90 m (6 ft 3 in)
- Position: Forward

Youth career
- –2000: Great Africans
- 2000–2002: Alemannia Aachen

Senior career*
Years	Team	Apps	(Gls)
2002–2003	Alemannia Aachen	4	(0)
2003–2004	Maccabi Tel Aviv		
2004–2005	Asante Kotoko		
2005–2006	Hearts of Oak		
2006–2007	King Faisal Babes		
2007–2008	Perak FA		
2008–2009	Vardar Skopje		
2009–2010	Lokeren	3	(0)

International career
- Ghana U-17
- * Club domestic league appearances and goals as of 5 August 2010

Baba Iddi (born 6 July 1982) is a Ghanaian football striker.

== Career ==
Iddi began his career with Great Africans in Kumasi before being scouted for Alemannia Aachen in 2000. He was the top scorer in the reserve team and he moved to the first team in 2002 playing in the 2. Fußball-Bundesliga. After one season, he moved to Maccabi Tel Aviv F.C. in 2004. After a year, he was sold to Asante Kotoko and played a year in Kumasi before being sold for €100.000 to Hearts of Oak in January 2005. He played another year with Hearts of Oak and moved in July 2006 to King Faisal Babes, where he was a finalist for the 2007 Ghana Premier League All-Star Team. He tried out for Perak FA in Malaysia and Dalian Shide in China, but did not get a contract. In August 2008, he left Perak and moved to FK Vardar in Macedonia. In summer 2009 he moved to Belgium and signed with KSC Lokeren.
