= Geoffrey Ghesquière =

Belgian footballer (born 1989)

Personal information
- Date of birth: 6 December 1989 (age 36)
- Place of birth: Roncq, France
- Height: 1.80 m (5 ft 11 in)
- Position: Midfielder

Team information
- Current team: Entente Acren-Lessines
- Number: 10

Youth career
- MFC Fontenelle
- FAN 96
- KFC Lille
- –2004: Wasquehal
- 2004–2008: Auxerre

Senior career*
| Years | Team | Apps | (Gls) |
| 2008 | Cercle Brugge | 0 | (0) |
| 2009 | Deinze | 3 | (0) |
| 2009–2010 | Roeselare | 0 | (0) |
| 2010–2012 | Kortrijk | 1 | (0) |
| 2012–2015 | Feignies | 62 | (7) |
| 2013 | → Saint-Quentin (loan) | 1 | (0) |
| 2016–2020 | Grande-Synthe | 82 | (3) |
| 2020 | La Louvière Centre | 7 | (1) |
| 2020–2022 | Olympic Charleroi | 29 | (1) |
| 2022–2023 | Royal Knokke | 37 | (4) |
| 2023–2025 | Olympic Charleroi | 54 | (3) |
| 2025– | Entente Acren-Lessines | 14 | (0) |
- * Club domestic league appearances and goals as of 14 December 2025

Geoffrey Ghesquière (born 6 December 1989) is a Belgian footballer who plays for Belgian Division 2 club Entente Acren-Lessines.

== Career ==
Ghesquière began his career with Belgian in Namur based club MFC Fontenelle, followed by Stations in France for Ferrain Association Neuvilloise in Neuville-en-Ferrain, Belgian club KFC Lille and another French side Wasquehal. In summer 2004 left Wasquehal and joined to French top club AJ Auxerre. After five years in France with AJ Auxerre joined back to his homeland Belgium to sign with Cercle Brugge K.S.V. Ghesquière moved in January 2009 from Cercle to K.M.S.K. Deinze who played three games. He played in this half year at Deinze only three games and was sold on 30 June 2009 a contract with K.S.V. Roeselare. After three year in Belgian, returned to France and signed for Feignies. Ghesquière played by Feignies, 43 games and scored six goals, before signed in January 2014 by Olympique Saint-Quentin.

On 22 June 2020 it was confirmed by Olympic Charleroi, that Ghesquière had joined the club.

== Personal life ==
His younger brother, Jérémy Ghesquière, is also a footballer who among others played for Namur based club MFC Fontenelle.
