= Daniel Calvo (footballer) =

Belgian footballer (born 1979)

Personal information
- Full name: Daniel Calvo Panizo
- Date of birth: 11 July 1979 (age 47)
- Place of birth: Brussels, Belgium
- Height: 1.74 m (5 ft 9 in)
- Position: Defender

Youth career
- –1998: Anderlecht

Senior career*
Years	Team	Apps	(Gls)
1998–2001	Anderlecht	1	(0)
2001–2003	Charleroi	17	(0)
2003–2009	Kortrijk	143	(2)
2009–2010	OH Leuven	20	(0)
2010–2013	UR Namur	54	(2)
2013–2014	BX Brussels		
- * Club domestic league appearances and goals

Daniel Calvo Panizo (born 11 July 1979) is a Belgian former professional footballer who played as a defender. Before playing at Namur, he played one match for Anderlecht and 17 for Charleroi in the Belgian Pro League. He then moved to Kortrijk in 2003, where he stayed until 2010. In this period, he promoted with Kortrijk from the Belgian Third Division back to the Belgian Pro League. After a one-season spell with OH Leuven, he then moved to UR Namur.
