= Kristof Snelders =

Belgian footballer

Personal information
- Full name: Kristof Snelders
- Date of birth: 5 September 1982 (age 44)
- Place of birth: Ekeren, Belgium
- Height: 1.68 m (5 ft 6 in)
- Position: Striker

Youth career
- 1992–1995: Germinal Ekeren
- 1995–1998: Feyenoord

Senior career*
Years	Team	Apps	(Gls)
1998–1999	Gent	1	(0)
1999–2004	G. Beerschot	91	(22)
2004–2006	FC Brussels	52	(4)
2006–2007	Lierse	32	(7)
2007–2009	Cercle Brugge	43	(6)
2009–2012	Beveren	51	(15)
2012–2013	Cappellen	27	(2)
2013–2016	Antonia KFC		
- * Club domestic league appearances and goals

Kristof Snelders is a Belgian professional retired football player. He was usually fielded as a striker, although also able to play as right winger.

== Career ==
In the beginning of July 2007, Snelders was signed by Cercle Brugge due to a relegation release clause in his contract with his former team Lierse, where he was voted Player of the Season by the fans.

Due to hard competition with De Smet, De Sutter, Iachtchouk and Gombami for a place in Cercle's attack, Snelders has become a super sub, scoring relatively frequently compared to his minutes played.

After a disappointing 2008-09 season, Snelders decided to watch out for a new team. SV Roeselare and KV Kortrijk were said to be interested. Eventually, he chose to sign for SK Beveren, thus rejecting an offer from RS Waasland. However Beveren and Waasland merged in 2010 and Snelders stayed with the fusion team Waasland-Beveren until the summer of 2012, when he moved to Cappellen. After one season at Cappellen, Snelders chose to retire from professional football at the age of 30.
