= Didier Dheedene =

Belgian footballer

Personal information
- Date of birth: 22 January 1972 (age 54)
- Place of birth: Antwerp, Belgium
- Height: 1.83 m (6 ft 0 in)
- Position: Defender

Youth career
- VAV Beerschot
- Olympia Wilrijk

Senior career*
Years	Team	Apps	(Gls)
1990–1997	Germinal Ekeren	169	(16)
1997–2001	Anderlecht	100	(9)
2001–2002	1860 Munich	19	(1)
2002–2006	Austria Vienna	86	(4)
2006–2009	Germinal Beerschot	68	(7)
2009–2010	Cappellen	0	(0)
Total		442	(37)

International career
2001–2004	Belgium	12	(0)
- * Club domestic league appearances and goals

Didier Dheedene (born 22 January 1972) is a Belgian former professional footballer who played as a left back and central defender. At club level he played for Royal Cappellen, K.F.C. Germinal Beerschot in Antwerp, Austria WIen, 1860 Munich and Anderlecht. He played twelve times for the Belgium national team.

== Honours ==
Germinal Ekeren

- Belgian Cup: 1996–97

Anderlecht

- Belgian First Division A: 1999–2000, 2000–01
- Belgian Super Cup: 2000
