= Cédric Bétrémieux =

French footballer (born 1982)

Personal information
- Date of birth: 14 May 1982 (age 44)
- Place of birth: Douai, France
- Height: 1.80 m (5 ft 11 in)
- Position: Striker

Team information
- Current team: Harelbeke

Youth career
- AC Cambrai

Senior career*
| Years | Team | Apps | (Gls) |
| 2000–2005 | Cambrai | | |
| 2005–2006 | Ronse | 9 | (1) |
| 2006–2007 | Feignies | 9 | (1) |
| 2007–2008 | Kortrijk | 34 | (15) |
| 2008 | Roeselare | 13 | (2) |
| 2009–2011 | Kortrijk | 0 | (0) |
| 2009–2010 | → OH Leuven (loan) | 24 | (13) |
| 2011 | → Péruwelz (loan) | | |
| 2011 | Fréjus Saint-Raphaël | 11 | (4) |
| 2012 | Paris Saint-Germain B | 16 | (1) |
| 2012–2013 | Compiègne | 15 | (4) |
| 2013–2014 | Feignies | 19 | (8) |
| 2015 | Istres | 11 | (3) |
| 2016–2017 | Izegem | | |
| 2017–2019 | Dikkelvenne | | |
| 2019– | Harelbeke | | |
- * Club domestic league appearances and goals as of 25 April 2015

Cédric Bétrémieux (born 14 May 1982) is a French footballer who is currently playing for Harelbeke in the Belgian Second Amateur Division. He previously played in the Belgian Pro League for Roeselare and Kortrijk.
