= Sven Verdonck =

Belgian footballer

Personal information
- Date of birth: 30 January 1988 (age 38)
- Place of birth: Herentals, Belgium
- Height: 1.85 m (6 ft 1 in)
- Position: Centre back

Team information
- Current team: KFC De Kempen

Youth career
- KFC Herselt
- –2005: Lierse
- 2005–2006: Racing Genk

Senior career*
Years	Team	Apps	(Gls)
2006–2009	Racing Genk	17	(0)
2007–2008	→ Brussels FC (loan)	8	(0)
2009–2010	Fortuna Sittard	12	(1)
2010–2013	Witgoor Sport Dessel		
2013–2014	Verbroedering Geel		
2014–2015	Witgoor Sport Dessel		
2015–	KFC De Kempen		

International career
2007	Belgium U-21	1	(0)
- * Club domestic league appearances and goals as of 27 December 2015

Sven Verdonck (born 30 January 1988 in Herentals) is a Belgian football player who plays in the central defence. He currently plays for KFC De Kempen.

== Career ==
In 2007, he went on loan to FC Brussels.

In August 2010 Verdonck was fired by Fortuna when he received a two-year suspension by the KNVB for the use of stanozolol in April 2010. The suspension was confirmed by the FIFA in March 2011.
