= Henri Munyaneza =

Rwandan footballer

Personal information
- Date of birth: 19 June 1984 (age 42)
- Place of birth: Kigali, Rwanda
- Height: 1.88 m (6 ft 2 in)
- Position: Striker

Senior career*
Years	Team	Apps	(Gls)
2003–2008	Dender EH	115	(40)
2003–2004	→ Aalst (loan)	23	(4)
2006–2007	→ Sint-Truidense VV (loan)	32	(5)
2008–2010	Germinal Beerschot	12	(1)
2009–2010	→ Dender EH (loan)		
2011	WS Woluwe		
2012–2013	Sint-Niklaas		
2013–2018	Berlare		

International career
2003–2008	Rwanda	7	(0)
- * Club domestic league appearances and goals

Henri Munyaneza (born 19 June 1984) is a retired Rwandan footballer. He was capped for the Rwanda national football team and was a squad member at the 2004 African Cup of Nations.
