= Fabien Camus =

Tunisian footballer (born 1985)

Personal information
- Full name: Fabien Bachir Camus
- Date of birth: 28 February 1985 (age 41)
- Place of birth: Arles, France
- Height: 1.76 m (5 ft 9 in)
- Position: Attacking midfielder

Youth career
- Arles-Avignon
- 2000–2002: Montpellier

Senior career*
Years	Team	Apps	(Gls)
2002–2003	Marseille B		
2003–2005	Marseille	2	(0)
2005–2009	Charleroi	100	(10)
2009–2015	Genk	104	(12)
2012–2013	→ Troyes (loan)	32	(7)
2014–2015	→ Évian (loan)	19	(0)
2015	→ Évian B (loan)	7	(0)
2015–2016	Troyes	35	(5)
2016–2018	Antwerp	18	(5)
2018	YR KV Mechelen	5	(0)
2018–2019	Montélimar		

International career^{‡}
2009–2015	Tunisia	3	(1)
- * Club domestic league appearances and goals as of 08:42, 17 July 2019 (UTC) ‡ National team caps and goals as of 08:38, 17 July 2019 (UTC)

Fabien Bachir Camus (born 28 February 1985) is a footballer who plays as an attacking midfielder. Born in France, he has played for the Tunisia national team.

== Club career ==
Camus joined Montpellier HSC at the age of 15. Two years later, he was remarked by a scout and taken to sign a contract with another French team Olympique de Marseille. Until he was 18, he played in the reserves, but after a while, he was promoted to the main team and he played several Ligue 1 matches.

He scored his first goal in the Belgian Jupiler League on 30 September 2005 against Club Brugge.

He had a great 2006–07 season, which raised the attention of major European clubs like Bayer Leverkusen, PSG, AS Monaco or Spartak Moscow and Panathinaikos.

In the summer of 2009, Camus signed a four-year deal with K.R.C. Genk. He joined French Ligue 1 side Évian in July 2014, signing a one-year loan deal.

In the summer of 2016, Camus signed a four-year deal with Royal Antwerp F.C.

In January 2018, Camus signed till the end of the season with YR KV Mechelen.

In December 2018, he signed with UMS Montélimar. He left the club again at the end of the season.

== International career ==
Camus was called to the Tunisia national football team in February 2009.

== Fraud ==
In October 2018, midfielder Camus was charged and detained as part of an anti-corruption investigation.

In November 2018, Camus, who had been locked up since October, was to be released from prison. The at that time club-less player was suspected of belonging to a criminal organization and of money laundering. He returned to the south of France.

== Career statistics ==
=== International ===
As of matches played on 17 July 2019

Tunisia national team
Year	Apps	Goals
2009	1	0
2010	0	0
2011	0	0
2012	0	0
2013	1	0
2014	0	0
2015	1	1
Total	3	1

== Honours ==
- Belgian Super Cup: 2011
