= Loris Reina =

French footballer (born 1980)

Personal information
- Date of birth: 10 June 1980 (age 46)
- Place of birth: Marseille, France
- Height: 1.80 m (5 ft 11 in)
- Position: Defender

Youth career
- 1990–1999: Olympique de Marseille

Senior career*
Years	Team	Apps	(Gls)
1999–2003	Olympique de Marseille	6	(0)
2000–2001	→ AS Nancy (loan)	30	(0)
2001–2002	→ Servette FC (loan)	8	(0)
2003–2006	R. Charleroi S.C.	66	(1)
2006–2009	S.V. Zulte Waregem	74	(1)
2009–2011	KV Kortrijk	20	(0)
- * Club domestic league appearances and goals as of 7 May 2011

Loris Reina (born 10 June 1980) is a French football player who last played for the Belgian club, KV Kortrijk.

== Career ==
The left back has previously played for Olympique Marseille. After three seasons, the 29-year-old French defender has left SV Zulte-Waregem to sign for KV Kortrijk on 19 June 2009.
