= Massimo Moia =

Belgian footballer

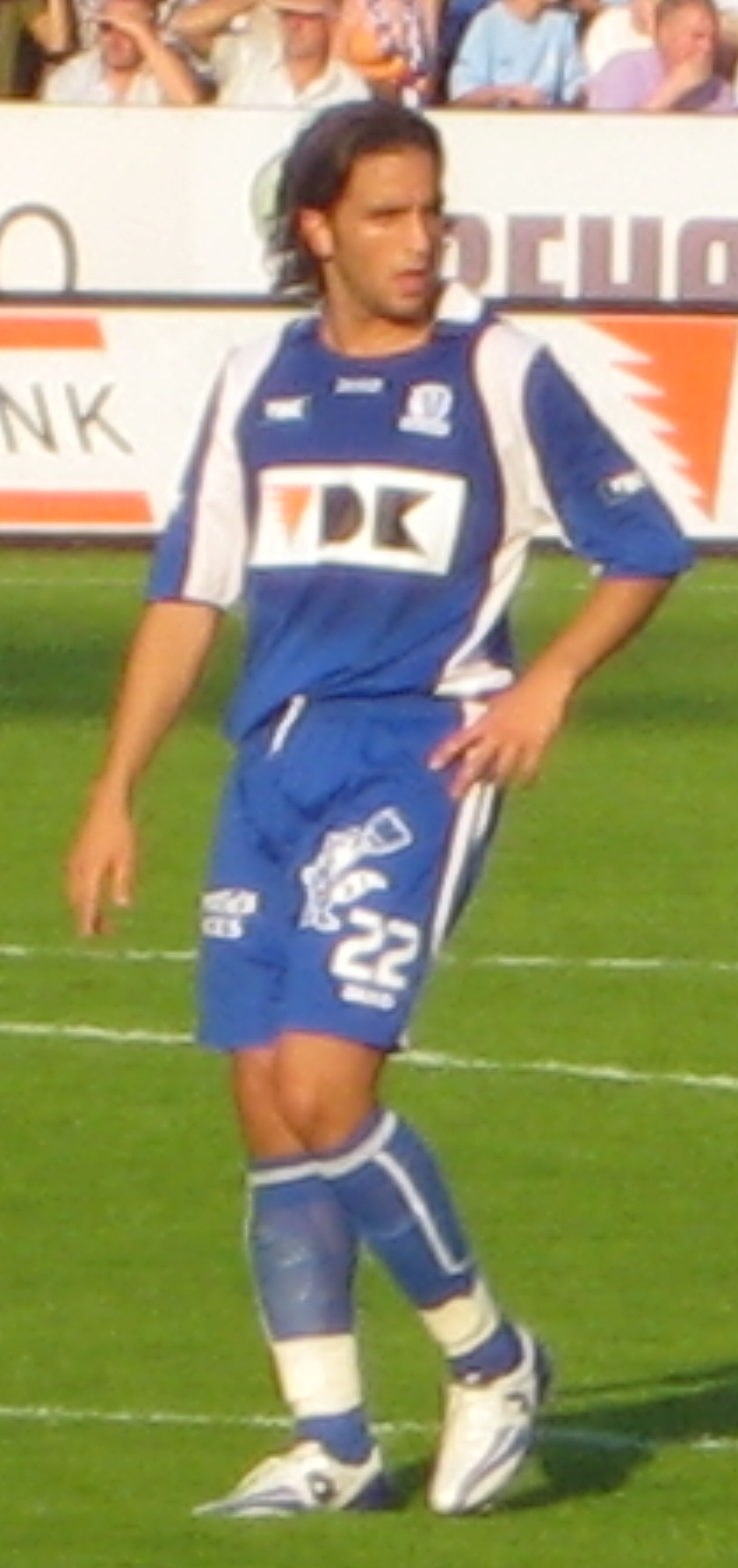

Personal information
- Date of birth: 9 March 1987 (age 39)
- Place of birth: Belgium
- Height: 1.77 m (5 ft 10 in)
- Position: Midfielder

Team information
- Current team: Grâce-Hollogne

Senior career*
Years	Team	Apps	(Gls)
2005–2007	FC Sochaux B		
2007–2008	Gent	30	(1)
2009–2010	Charleroi	13	(0)
2009	→ Sint-Truidense (Loan)	3	(0)
2011	Tubize		
2011–2012	Visé		
2012–	Grâce-Hollogne		

International career
2005–2006	Belgium U19	11	(1)
2007	Belgium U21	5	(0)
- * Club domestic league appearances and goals as of 28 September 2009

Massimo Moia (born 9 March 1987) is a Belgian football midfielder, who currently plays for Grâce-Hollogne in Belgium.
