= KSK Heist =

Professional football club from Heist-op-den-Berg, Belgium

Heist
- Full name: Koninklijke Sportkring Heist
- Short name: Heist
- Founded: 1940; 86 years ago
- Ground: Gemeentelijk Sportcentrum, Heist-op-den-Berg, Belgium
- Capacity: 7,000
- Chairman: Patrick Wijns
- Manager: Stéphane Demets
- League: Belgian Division 1
- 2025–26: Belgian Division 2 VV B, 1st of 16 (promoted)
- Website: www.kskheist.be
| Home colours | Away colours |

Koninklijke Sportkring Heist is a professional Belgian association football club from Heist-op-den-Berg in the province of Antwerp. They are affiliated to the Royal Belgian Football Association with matricule 2948 and have white and blue as traditional colours. The club plays at the Gemeentelijk Sportcentrum and currently play in the Belgian Division 1. Heist spent nine seasons at the third level of Belgian football, from 1987 to 1994 and from 2008 to 2010.

== History ==
The club was founded as FC Heist-Sportief in September 1940 . In January 1941, the team played in the Flemish Association, not part of the Belgian Football Association, but a different competitive amateur football league. In the spring of 1941 they moved to the Belgian Football Association, where they were awarded matriculation number 2948. Since then, it received the royal prefix Koninklijke in 1990, and in July 1995 it merged with KSV Heist-op-den-Berg to become the professional club it is today KSK Heist.

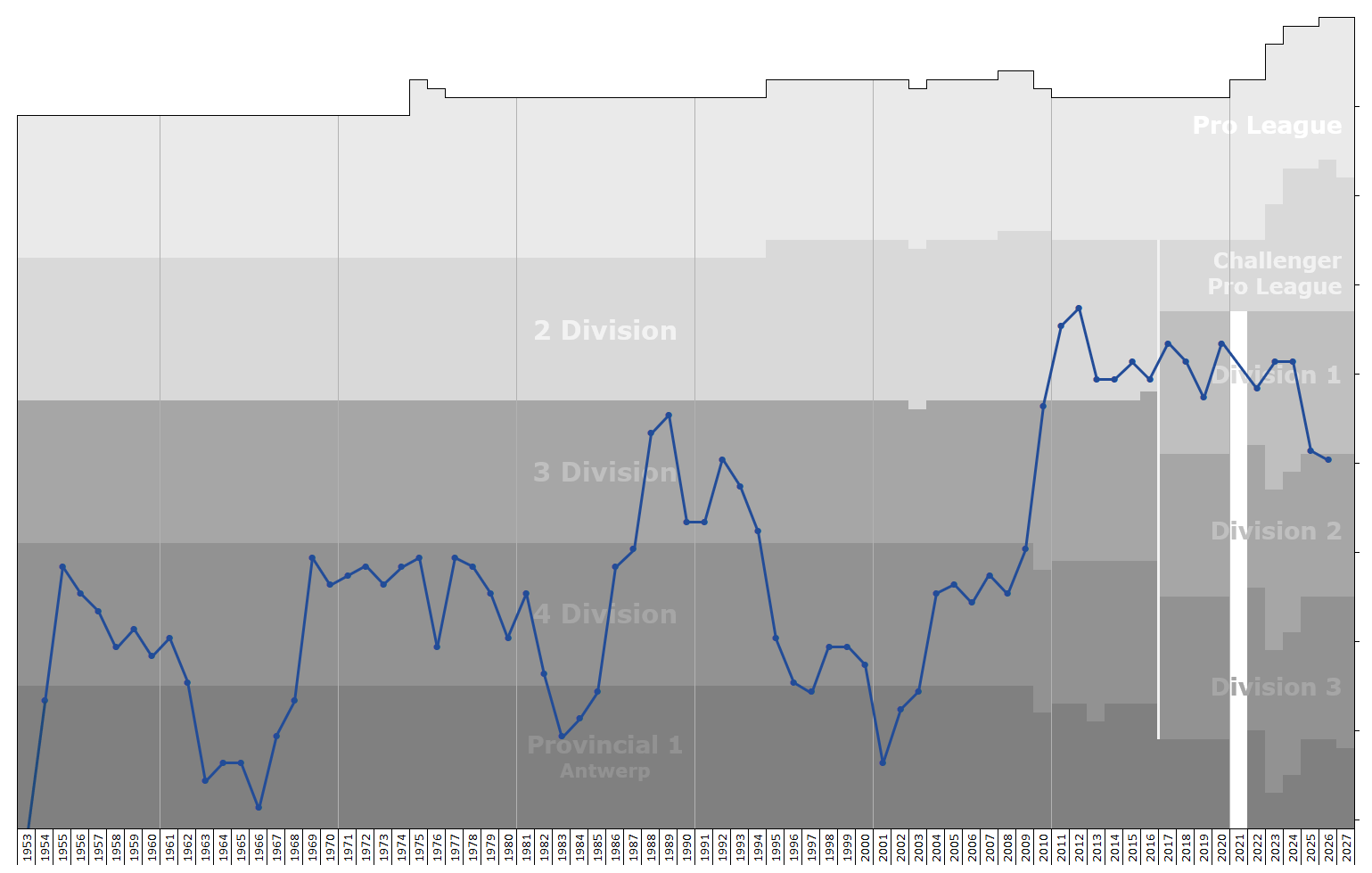
Historical chart of KSK Heist league performance

== Stadium ==
KSK Heist play their home games at Gemeentelijk Sportcentrum in Heist-op-den-Berg. The Stadium has a capacity of 3,500, and home games are well attended throughout the season, with larger crowds expected for the local rivalry games against KVC Westerlo and KV Mechelen.

== Current squad ==
As of 1 March 2025.

Note: Flags indicate national team as defined under FIFA eligibility rules; some limited exceptions apply. Players may hold more than one non-FIFA nationality.

| No. | Pos. | Nation | Player |
|---|---|---|---|
| 1 | GK | BEL | Fré Van Aerschot |
| 2 | DF | BEL | Axel Dierickx |
| 3 | FW | CMR | Brice Melo |
| 4 | DF | BEL | Maxim Nys |
| 5 | MF | CGO | Scott Bitsindou |
| 6 | MF | BEL | Yousri Sabhaoui |
| 7 | FW | BEL | Mylan Carrasco |
| 8 | FW | MAR | Faissal Boujemaoui |
| 9 | FW | BEL | Jef Colman |
| 10 | MF | BEL | Yannick Reuten |
| 11 | MF | BEL | Jasper Goossens |
| 14 | DF | BEL | Kobe Lemmans |
| 15 | DF | BEL | Sebastien Zoete |

| No. | Pos. | Nation | Player |
|---|---|---|---|
| 17 | FW | BEL | Mathieu Troonbeeckx |
| 18 | DF | BEL | Beau De Wit |
| 20 | MF | BEL | Mathis Heyselberghs |
| 22 | DF | BEL | Mike Smet |
| 24 | DF | BEL | Brent Peers |
| 25 | DF | BEL | Kobe Vande Cauter |
| 27 | FW | NED | Keone Maho |
| 34 | MF | BEL | Rayane Hannach |
| 39 | MF | BEL | Yannis Augustijnen |
| 45 | FW | BEL | Matt Jannes |
| 49 | GK | BEL | Anton Kemps |
| 81 | FW | BEL | Glenn Van Hout |
| 87 | GK | BEL | Hendrik Fierens |
