= Istvan Bakx =

Dutch footballer

Personal information
- Full name: Istvan Bakx
- Date of birth: 20 January 1986 (age 40)
- Place of birth: Vlissingen, Netherlands
- Height: 1.74 m (5 ft 9 in)
- Position: Midfielder

Youth career
- 1992–1996: Zeeland Sport
- 1996: Feyenoord
- 1996–2003: RCS

Senior career*
Years	Team	Apps	(Gls)
2003–2005	Kloetinge		
2005–2006	Sparta Rotterdam	2	(0)
2006–2007	Hoek	23	(3)
2007–2009	Kortrijk	58	(17)
2009–2012	Genk	3	(0)
2010–2011	→ Den Bosch (loan)	32	(8)
2012	Willem II	9	(3)
2012–2013	AGOVV Apeldoorn	17	(0)
2013–2014	Den Bosch	38	(4)
2014–2018	FC Oss	141	(21)
2018–2019	Go Ahead Eagles	35	(4)
2019	Spakenburg	0	(0)
2019–2020	Ajax Cape Town	22	(0)
2020–2022	Hoek	31	(6)

International career
2008	Netherlands U21	1	(0)
- * Club domestic league appearances and goals

Istvan Bakx (born 20 January 1986) is a Dutch former professional footballer. He was a left-footed winger, and could also be used as a striker.

== Club career ==
Bakx was discovered by Sparta Rotterdam in 2005, while he was playing for VV Kloetinge in the Hoofdklasse, the highest Dutch amateur league. At the end of the season, Sparta offered Bakx a new contract. But Bakx refused to sign, opting to focus on his school career, and went to HSV Hoek, another team playing in the Hoofdklasse. Bakx was chosen as Player of the Year at the end of his season in Hoek. In July 2007, Bakx went to Belgian second division side KV Kortrijk. He promoted with Kortrijk to the highest level of Belgian football. When his manager and discoverer Hein Vanhaezebrouck signed for RC Genk after the 2008-09 season, he took Bakx with him.

=== The Google Striker ===
Bakx gained some notability in Belgium with his transfer to Kortrijk. Manager Hein Vanhaezebrouck was searching for a left-footed attacker and had typed in those words at search engine Google. Search results showed a positive report on Bakx, and Vanhaezebrouck contacted Kortrijk's head scout. As these scouting reports were also positive, Bakx' transfer to Kortrijk became a fact. As a result, Belgian media nicknamed Bakx the Google striker. Bakx impressed in Belgium as part of the KV Kortrijk side that chalked up a shock 5-1 Belgian Cup victory against AA Gent, in which Bakx scored a hat-trick. Sadly for Bakx and Kortrijk, Gent won the return 4-0, defeating Kortrijk on aggregate.

=== South Africa ===
On 26 July 2019, SV Spakenburg announced that Bakx had joined the club. But however, one month later, he left the club again to join South African club Ajax Cape Town.

=== Return to Hoek ===
In September 2020, Bakx returned to HSV Hoek after leaving the club 13 years earlier.

== International career ==
On 13 March 2008, Bakx was taken up into the pre-selection for Netherlands national under-21 for the match against Estonia.
