= 2012–13 Belgian Pro League =

110th season of top-tier football in Belgium

Jupiler Pro League
- Season: 2012–13
- Champions: Anderlecht
- Relegated: Beerschot
- Champions League: Anderlecht; Zulte Waregem
- Europa League: Genk; Club Brugge; Standard Liège
- Matches: 302
- Goals: 880 (2.91 per match)
- Top goalscorer: Carlos Bacca (25 goals)
- Biggest home win: Standard 7–0 Gent
- Biggest away win: Beerschot 1–7 Club Brugge
- Highest scoring: Charleroi 2–6 Standard Liège; Waasland-Beveren 2–6 Club Brugge; Beerschot 1–7 Club Brugge; OH Leuven 2–6 Lokeren
- Longest winning run: 11 matches Anderlecht
- Longest unbeaten run: 17 matches Zulte Waregem
- Longest winless run: 14 matches Beerschot; Cercle Brugge
- Longest losing run: 9 matches Cercle Brugge

The 2012–13 season of the Belgian Pro League (also known as Jupiler Pro League for sponsorship reasons) was the 110th season of top-tier football in Belgium. It started on 28 July 2012 with the first match of the regular season between Kortrijk and defending champions Anderlecht, and ended on 26 May 2013, which was the return leg of the European playoff.

During the regular season, Club Brugge took the early lead but then started struggling, eventually leading to the sacking of head coach Georges Leekens when they dropped out of the top 6 in November. Anderlecht and overachievers Zulte Waregem took over the top two positions and comfortably held these until the playoffs.

The title playoffs started with Anderlecht on 34 points and Zulte Waregem just behind them on 32. Due to the division of the points by two, they held a smaller lead over Genk (28 points), Club Brugge (27), Lokeren (26) and Standard (25). To the surprise of many, Zulte Waregem took the lead about halfway through the playoffs and with Anderlecht not performing well and suffering a penalty kick trauma (missing no less than 10 penalty kicks over the course of the season and going out on penalties to Genk in the Belgian Cup), both Genk, Club Brugge and Standard Liège rapidly close the gap. Anderlecht managed to overtake Zulte Waregem again and went into the final match on 19 May 2013, at home against Zulte Waregem, with a two-point lead. Anderlecht equalized after going down 0-1 and under pressure managed to hold on, even though losing Cheikhou Kouyaté due to a red card. With that, Anderlecht won its 32nd title. The draw allowed Zulte Waregem to remain just in front of Club Brugge, thereby gaining access to the Champions League. Club Brugge and Genk qualified for the Europa League, due to finishing 3rd and winning the Cup respectively.

The Europa League playoff groups were won by Gent and Oud-Heverlee Leuven, with Gent easily beating OH Leuven for the overall win. Gent had played a disappointing season, initially aiming for the top 6 but eventually finishing 12th. By winning the Europa League playoff, they won the right to play against Standard Liège for the final Europa League ticket. Gent won the first match 1-0 but lost the return 7–0, allowing Standard to take the last European ticket.

In the bottom end of the table, Cercle Brugge faced a miserable season after finishing 7th the previous season, as now only three wins and five draws out of thirty matches caused them to end in last place. Lierse narrowly held of Beerschot, causing Cercle Brugge and Beerschot to play the relegation playoff. Beerschot initially extended their lead, but Cercle Brugge came back and on 20 April 2013, a 2–1 win by Cercle caused Beerschot to be relegated. Beerschot had been playing in the top division since 1989–90, initially as Germinal Ekeren, then as Germinal Beerschot. A few days after the relegation it was announced that Beerschot was in severe financial trouble and was not given a license for professional football. On 21 May, Beerschot was officially declared bankrupt and dissolved as a whole. Cercle Brugge on the other hand, had to play the Belgian Second Division final round with second division teams Mouscron-Péruwelz, Westerlo and WS Woluwe. On 23 May 2013, Cercle Brugge became the first team succeeding in avoiding relegation after playing the relegation playoff, since the installation of the playoffs system in 2009–10.

== Teams ==
Following the 2011–12 Belgian Pro League, Sint-Truiden were relegated to the 2012–13 Belgian Second Division after losing their relegation playoff series against Westerlo, ending a three-season tenure in the league. Sint-Truiden were replaced by 2011–12 Second Division champions Charleroi, who made their immediate comeback to the highest Belgian football league. In the 2012 Belgian Second Division final round, Westerlo faced Second Division teams Eupen, Oostende and Waasland-Beveren. On 17 May 2012, Westerlo were relegated after a 0–0 draw away to Oostende. Also in Oostende, Waasland-Beveren secured the promotion one week later after a 1–1 draw.

=== Stadia and locations ===
Location of the 2012–13 Belgian Pro League teams

Club	Location	Venue	Capacity
R.S.C. Anderlecht	Anderlecht	Constant Vanden Stock Stadium	21,000
Beerschot A.C.	Antwerp	Olympisch Stadion	13,132
Cercle Brugge K.S.V.	Bruges	Jan Breydel Stadium	29,945
R. Charleroi S.C.	Charleroi	Stade du Pays de Charleroi	25,000
Club Brugge KV	Bruges	Jan Breydel Stadium	29,945
K.R.C. Genk	Genk	Cristal Arena	24,900
K.A.A. Gent	Ghent	Jules Ottenstadion	12,919
K.V. Kortrijk	Kortrijk	Guldensporen Stadion	9,500
Lierse S.K.	Lier	Herman Vanderpoortenstadion	14,538
K.S.C. Lokeren Oost-Vlaanderen	Lokeren	Daknamstadion	10,000
K.V. Mechelen	Mechelen	Argosstadion Achter de Kazerne	13,123
R.A.E.C. Mons	Mons	Stade Charles Tondreau	12,000
Oud-Heverlee Leuven	Leuven	Den Dreef	9,493
Standard Liège	Liège	Stade Maurice Dufrasne	30,000
Waasland-Beveren	Beveren	Freethiel Stadion	13,290
S.V. Zulte Waregem	Waregem	Regenboogstadion	8,500

=== Managerial changes ===
Team	Outgoing manager	Manner of departure	Date of vacancy	Position	Replaced by	Date of appointment
Club Brugge	(Germany) Christoph Daum	Mutual consent	10 May 2012	Pre-season	(Belgium) Georges Leekens	13 May 2012
Anderlecht	(Belgium) Ariël Jacobs	Resigned	End of 2011–12 season	Pre-season	(Netherlands) John van den Brom	30 May 2012
Standard Liège	(Belgium) José Riga	Resigned	End of 2011–12 season	Pre-season	(Netherlands) Ron Jans	29 May 2012
Mechelen	(Belgium) Marc Brys	Sacked	End of 2011–12 season	Pre-season	(Belgium) Harm van Veldhoven	25 May 2012
Charleroi	(Netherlands) Dennis van Wijk	Resigned	End of 2011–12 season	Pre-season	(Belgium) Yannick Ferrera	13 July 2012
Standard Liège	(Netherlands) Ron Jans	Mutual consent	22 October 2012	12th	(Romania) Mircea Rednic	27 October 2012
Gent	(Norway) Trond Sollied	Sacked	23 October 2012	7th	(Belgium) Bob Peeters	1 November 2012
Cercle Brugge	(Belgium) Bob Peeters	Sacked	27 October 2012	16th	(Netherlands) Foeke Booy	5 November 2012
Club Brugge	(Belgium) Georges Leekens	Sacked	4 November 2012	7th	(Spain) Juan Carlos Garrido	15 November 2012
Lierse	(Belgium) Chris Janssens	Sacked	12 November 2012	14th	(Egypt) Hany Ramzy	12 November 2012
Waasland-Beveren	(Belgium) Dirk Geeraerd	Sacked	18 November 2012	16th	(Belgium) Glen De Boeck	19 November 2012
Beerschot	(Netherlands) Adrie Koster	Sacked	29 November 2012	12th	(Belgium) Wim De Corte	29 November 2012
Gent	(Belgium) Bob Peeters	Sacked	3 January 2013	12th	(Spain) Víctor Fernández	9 January 2013
Beerschot	(Belgium) Wim De Corte	Resigned	22 January 2013	15th	(Belgium) Jacky Mathijssen	23 January 2013
Charleroi	(Belgium) Yannick Ferrera	Resigned	14 February 2013	11th	(Croatia) Luka Peruzović	14 February 2013
Lierse	(Egypt) Hany Ramzy	Became technical director	14 March 2013	14th	(Belgium) Eric Van Meir	14 March 2013
Charleroi	(Croatia) Luka Peruzović	Replaced	18 March 2013	11th	(Italy) Mario Notaro (Belgium) Michel Iannacone (Belgium) Philippe Simonin	18 March 2013
Cercle Brugge	(Netherlands) Foeke Booy	Sacked	2 April 2013	2nd in Relegation Playoff	(Belgium) Lorenzo Staelens	2 April 2013

== Regular season ==
=== League table ===
Pos	Team	Pld	W	D	L	GF	GA	GD	Pts	Qualification
1	Anderlecht	30	20	7	3	69	27	+42	67	Qualification for the Championship play-offs
2	Zulte Waregem	30	19	6	5	49	29	+20	63	Qualification for the Championship play-offs
3	Genk	30	15	10	5	63	40	+23	55	Qualification for the Championship play-offs
4	Club Brugge	30	15	9	6	66	43	+23	54	Qualification for the Championship play-offs
5	Lokeren	30	14	9	7	53	38	+15	51	Qualification for the Championship play-offs
6	Standard Liège	30	15	5	10	54	33	+21	50	Qualification for the Championship play-offs
7	Mons	30	13	5	12	48	53	−5	44	Qualification for the Europa League play-offs
8	Mechelen	30	12	5	13	44	42	+2	41	Qualification for the Europa League play-offs
9	Kortrijk	30	11	6	13	31	30	+1	39	Qualification for the Europa League play-offs
10	OH Leuven	30	8	12	10	46	51	−5	36	Qualification for the Europa League play-offs
11	Charleroi	30	10	4	16	30	49	−19	34	Qualification for the Europa League play-offs
12	Gent	30	8	10	12	33	40	−7	34	Qualification for the Europa League play-offs
13	Waasland-Beveren	30	7	9	14	28	49	−21	30	Qualification for the Europa League play-offs
14	Lierse	30	5	11	14	28	53	−25	26	Qualification for the Europa League play-offs
15	Beerschot	30	6	5	19	31	61	−30	23	Qualification for the Relegation play-offs
16	Cercle Brugge	30	3	5	22	30	65	−35	14	Qualification for the Relegation play-offs

Source: Belgian Pro League
Rules for classification: 1) points; 2) number of matches won; if teams are still tied a playoff is organised.

=== Positions by round ===
Note: The classification was made after the weekend (or midweek) of each matchday, so postponed matches were only processed at the time they were played to represent the real evolution in standings.

The following matches were postponed during the season:

- Matchday 23: on 20 January both the match between leaders Anderlecht and second placed Zulte Waregem and the Bruges derby between Club Brugge and Cercle Brugge were postponed due to intensive snowing. They have been rescheduled to be played end of February between matchdays 28 and 29.
- Matchday 24: also due to snow, the match between Charleroi and Cercle Brugge was postponed on 26 January. The match was played on 20 February, between matchdays 27 and 28.
- Matchday 28: yet again it was snow that prevented a match to be played. The fixture between Charleroi and Zulte Waregem was postponed on 24 February and rescheduled to 3 March, between matchdays 28 and 29.

Team ╲ Round	1	2	3	4	5	6	7	8	9	10	11	12	13	14	15	16	17	18	19	20	21	22	23	24	25	26	27	28	29	30
Anderlecht	9	7	1	2	2	2	3	2	2	3	2	3	2	2	1	1	1	1	1	1	1	1	1	1	1	1	1	1	1	1
Zulte Waregem	6	1	3	2	5	5	2	6	4	2	5	1	1	1	2	2	2	2	2	2	2	2	2	2	2	2	2	2	2	2
Genk	8	9	6	7	6	7	6	4	3	4	3	4	5	3	3	4	4	4	3	5	6	6	6	6	5	4	3	3	3	3
Club Brugge	4	1	2	1	1	1	1	1	1	1	1	2	4	8	8	5	5	6	6	4	3	4	5	5	6	6	6	4	4	4
Lokeren	2	4	7	5	7	9	8	8	10	11	9	9	6	4	4	3	3	3	4	6	4	3	3	3	3	3	5	5	6	5
Standard Liège	11	11	8	4	3	3	7	10	12	9	12	11	8	7	7	9	7	5	5	3	5	5	4	4	4	5	4	6	5	6
Mons	1	3	4	8	11	8	10	12	9	10	8	8	10	9	9	7	9	8	8	8	8	7	9	9	9	9	9	8	7	7
Mechelen	3	5	5	9	11	13	11	7	8	12	10	10	11	11	11	11	11	11	10	10	10	9	8	7	8	8	7	7	8	8
Kortrijk	10	6	10	11	8	6	5	9	6	5	4	5	7	5	5	6	6	7	7	7	7	8	7	8	7	7	8	9	9	9
OH Leuven	16	14	13	10	10	12	14	13	11	8	6	6	3	6	6	8	8	9	9	9	9	10	10	10	10	10	10	10	10	10
Charleroi	13	15	11	12	14	15	13	14	14	14	13	13	13	13	13	14	14	13	13	12	11	11	11	12	13	11	12	12	12	11
Gent	5	8	9	6	4	3	4	3	5	6	7	7	9	10	10	10	10	10	11	11	12	12	12	13	11	12	11	11	11	12
Waasland-Beveren	14	12	16	16	15	14	15	15	15	15	15	15	16	15	15	16	15	15	14	13	13	13	13	11	12	13	13	13	13	13
Lierse	15	13	12	13	9	11	12	11	13	13	14	14	14	14	14	13	13	14	15	15	15	15	14	15	14	14	15	14	14	14
Beerschot	12	15	14	15	13	10	9	5	7	7	11	12	12	12	12	12	12	12	12	14	14	14	15	14	15	15	14	15	15	15
Cercle Brugge	7	10	15	14	16	16	16	16	16	16	16	16	15	16	16	15	16	16	16	16	16	16	16	16	16	16	16	16	16	16

Source: soccerassociation.com

=== Results ===
Home \ Away	AND	BEE	CER	CHA	BRU	GNK	GNT	KVK	LIE	LOK	KVM	MON	OHL	STA	WBE	ZWA
Anderlecht		1–0	2–1	2–0	6–1	2–2	5–0	1–0	4–1	3–0	1–0	2–1	2–1	2–2	2–0	0–1
Beerschot	1–4		3–1	2–0	1–7	0–2	2–2	2–1	1–3	2–4	0–2	0–0	1–3	3–2	1–2	1–1
Cercle Brugge	0–3	3–1		1–0	0–3	3–1	2–2	1–2	0–3	0–1	1–2	1–3	1–1	0–1	2–2	1–2
Charleroi	2–0	1–0	2–1		0–1	1–2	1–1	2–0	1–0	0–2	1–1	1–2	0–4	2–6	3–0	0–1
Club Brugge	2–2	3–1	4–0	1–0		1–1	0–0	0–0	3–0	2–3	1–1	2–0	3–1	4–2	3–1	0–1
Genk	2–4	3–0	3–3	3–1	4–1		3–2	2–0	4–1	1–0	2–1	5–1	1–1	0–2	1–1	2–0
Gent	1–1	2–1	2–0	1–2	2–2	1–2		0–1	2–0	2–1	0–2	2–0	1–1	0–0	0–2	0–1
Kortrijk	1–1	4–0	3–1	0–1	1–1	1–1	1–0		4–1	2–3	2–1	0–1	0–0	2–1	2–1	1–2
Lierse	1–1	1–3	1–1	0–1	3–2	1–1	2–0	1–0		1–1	0–2	0–3	1–1	0–0	0–0	1–4
Lokeren	0–2	1–0	3–0	1–1	1–1	3–4	2–2	0–1	2–2		2–1	2–2	2–2	2–1	2–0	1–1
Mechelen	1–4	0–2	2–0	4–2	3–3	2–1	1–0	0–2	3–0	2–1		3–0	1–2	0–2	0–1	2–3
Mons	0–5	1–0	3–2	2–3	1–3	1–5	0–2	1–0	1–1	1–2	2–3		5–2	3–1	3–0	1–1
OH Leuven	1–1	1–1	3–2	1–0	4–1	2–2	1–1	0–0	2–2	2–6	3–1	1–3		0–4	5–2	0–1
Standard Liège	2–1	3–0	2–1	6–1	1–3	0–0	1–2	2–0	3–0	0–2	3–2	0–1	2–0		3–1	0–1
Waasland-Beveren	1–2	3–2	2–0	0–0	2–6	1–1	0–2	1–0	1–1	0–0	0–0	2–2	2–0	0–2		0–2
Zulte Waregem	2–3	0–0	3–1	4–1	1–2	3–2	3–1	2–0	2–0	0–3	1–1	2–4	2–1	0–0	2–0	

Source: Soccerway
Legend: Blue = home team win; Yellow = draw; Red = away team win.

== Championship playoff ==
The points obtained during the regular season were halved (and rounded up) before the start of the playoff. As a result, the teams started with the following points before the playoff: Anderlecht 34 points, Zulte Waregem 32, Genk 28, Club Brugge 27, Lokeren 26 and Standard 25. In the event of ties at the end of the playoffs, the half point will be deducted if it was added. Anderlecht, Genk, Lokeren and Zulte Waregem received this type of bonus due to rounding and will thus always be ranked below Club Brugge and Standard in the event of ties.

=== Playoff table ===
Pos	Team	Pld	W	D	L	GF	GA	GD	Pts	Qualification
1	Anderlecht (C)	10	4	3	3	16	11	+5	49	Qualification for the Champions League group stage
2	Zulte Waregem	10	4	3	3	20	20	0	47	Qualification for the Champions League third qualifying round
3	Club Brugge	10	6	1	3	21	17	+4	46	Qualification for the Europa League third qualifying round
4	Standard Liège	10	5	2	3	22	20	+2	42	Qualification for the Testmatches
5	Genk	10	3	3	4	11	13	−2	40	Qualification for the Europa League play-off round
6	Lokeren	10	1	2	7	15	24	−9	31	

Source: soccerway.com
Rules for classification: 1) points; 2) points after deduction of (possible) half points added due to rounding; 3) number of wins; 4) goal difference; 5) number of goals scored; 6) number of away goals scored; 7) number of away wins.
(C) Champions

=== Positions by round ===
Below the positions per round are shown. As teams did not all start with an equal number of points, the initial pre-playoffs positions are also given.

Team ╲ Round	Initial	1	2	3	4	5	6	7	8	9	10
Anderlecht	1	1	1	1	1	2	2	1	1	1	1
Zulte Waregem	2	2	2	3	2	1	1	3	3	2	2
Club Brugge	4	5	4	5	5	5	4	2	2	3	3
Standard Liège	6	4	5	4	3	3	3	5	5	5	4
Genk	3	3	3	2	4	4	5	4	4	4	5
Lokeren	5	6	6	6	6	6	6	6	6	6	6

=== Results ===
Home \ Away	AND	ZWA	GNK	BRU	STA	LOK
Anderlecht		1–1	1–2	1–1	2–0	3–0
Zulte Waregem	2–1		0–4	5–2	3–4	1–1
Genk	1–2	1–1		0–2	1–1	2–1
Club Brugge	2–1	3–4	1–0		0–2	2–1
Standard Liège	0–0	1–0	3–0	2–4		4–3
Lokeren	2–4	2–3	0–0	1–4	4–1	

Legend: Blue = home team win; Yellow = draw; Red = away team win.

== Europa League Playoff ==
Group A contains the teams finishing the regular season in positions 7, 9, 12 and 14. The teams finishing in positions 8, 10, 11 and 13 are placed in Group B.

=== Group A ===
Pos	Team	Pld	W	D	L	GF	GA	GD	Pts	Qualification	GNT	MON	LIE	KVK
1	Gent (A)	6	4	2	0	9	3	+6	14	Qualification for the Playoff Final		2–1	3–0	1–0
2	Mons	6	3	1	2	7	8	−1	10		1–1		2–1	2–1
3	Lierse	6	1	1	4	5	8	−3	4		1–2	0–1		0–0
4	Kortrijk	6	1	2	3	4	6	−2	2 (Note: 3 points deducted)		0–0	ANN (Note: In the match between Kortrijk and Mons, Kortrijk substituted in Brecht Dejaegere in the 89th minute while leading 3-0. As Dejaegere had not been submitted on the match sheet prior to the match, he was not allowed to play. The Belgian FA ruled that neither team received the points, thus annulling the result and taking away three points from Kortrijk.)	0–3	

Legend: Blue = home team win; Yellow = draw; Red = away team win.
(A) Advanced to the Final

=== Group B ===
Pos	Team	Pld	W	D	L	GF	GA	GD	Pts	OHL	KVM	CHA	W-B
1	OH Leuven (A)	6	3	1	2	9	8	+1	10		0–3	0–0	3–1
2	Mechelen	6	3	1	2	8	7	+1	10	1–5		0–0	2–0
3	Charleroi	6	1	4	1	5	3	+2	7	3–0	1–2		1–1
4	Waasland-Beveren	6	1	2	3	3	7	−4	5	0–1	1–0	0–0	

Legend: Blue = home team win; Yellow = draw; Red = away team win.
(A) Advanced to the Final

=== Europa League playoff final ===
The winners of both playoff groups will compete in a two-legged match to play the fourth-placed team of the championship playoff, called Testmatch. The winners of this Testmatch are granted entry to the second qualifying round of the 2012–13 UEFA Europa League.

11 May 2013
18:00 CEST

OH Leuven	1–4	Gent
Ruytinx 3'	report	Soumahoro 19'; Kage 33' van der Bruggen 59'; Mboyo 81' (pen.)

Den Dreef, Leuven
Attendance: 6,580
Referee: Alexandre Boucaut

18 May 2013
20:00 CEST

Gent	4–1	OH Leuven
López 6', 42'; Brüls 72'; Coulibaly 82'	report	Ngolok 59'

Jules Ottenstadion, Ghent
Attendance: 6,190
Referee: Jérôme Efong Nzolo

Gent won 8–2 on aggregate.

=== Testmatches Europa League ===
The Europa League playoff final winners will compete with the fourth placed team (or fifth placed in case the winner of the 2012–13 Belgian Cup finishes third or fourth) in the Championship playoff for the final European ticket.

23 May 2013
20:30 CEST

Gent	1–0	Standard Liège
Mboyo 83'	report

Jules Ottenstadion, Ghent
Attendance: 10,110
Referee: Johan Verbist

26 May 2013
20:00 CEST

Standard Liège	7–0	Gent
Batshuayi 4'; Bulot 15'; M'Poku 35', 40' (pen.), 79' (pen.); Ghoochannejhad 73', 83'

Stade Maurice Dufrasne, Liège
Referee: Serge Gumienny

Standard Liège won 7–1 on aggregate.

== Relegation playoff ==
Beerschot and Cercle Brugge, the teams finishing in the last two positions, faced each other in the relegation playoff. Beerschot initially extended their three-point bonus to a six-point lead, but thereafter Cercle Brugge won three matches in a row. This caused Beerschot to be relegated to the Second Division on 20 April 2013 after playing in the first division since 1989 (as Germinal Ekeren until 1999 and as Germinal Beerschot from 1999 until 2011). One month later however, it was announced that Beerschot had gone bankrupt and dissolved.

Cercle Brugge was forced to play the second division playoff with three Belgian Second Division teams, which they won to avoid relegation. It was the first time a team from the Pro League succeeded in surviving the Second Division Final Round since the installment of the Belgian Pro League playoffs.

Pos	Team	Pld	W	D	L	GF	GA	GD	Pts	Qualification or relegation
1	Cercle Brugge	4	3	0	1	3	2	+1	9	Qualification for the Belgian Second Division final round
2	Beerschot (R)	4	1	0	3	2	3	−1	6	Relegation to 2013–14 Belgian Second Division

Source: soccerway.com
Rules for classification: 1) points; 2) head-to-head points; 3) head-to-head goal difference; 4) head-to-head goals scored; 5) goal difference; 6) number of goals scored.
(R) Relegated

Home \ Away	CER	BEE	CER	BEE	CER	BEE
Cercle Brugge		1–0		2–1		
Beerschot	1–0		1–2		– (Note: Match not played as Beerschot could no longer overtake Cercle Brugge in the standings. In case of ties, Cercle Brugge was always ranked above Beerschot due to the head-to-head points in the relegation playoff.)	

Source: soccerway.com
Legend: Blue = home team win; Yellow = draw; Red = away team win.

== Season statistics ==
Source: Sporza.be and Sport.be (in Dutch)

=== Top scorers ===
Position	Player	Club	Goals
1	(Colombia) Carlos Bacca	Club Brugge	25
2	(Belgium) Ilombe Mboyo	Gent	20
3	(The Gambia) Ibou	OH Leuven	19
3	(Democratic Republic of the Congo) Dieumerci Mbokani	Anderlecht	19
5	(Belgium) Maxime Lestienne	Club Brugge	17
5	(Senegal) Mbaye Leye	Zulte Waregem	17
5	(Belgium) Jelle Vossen	Genk	17
8	(Nigeria) Imoh Ezekiel	Standard Liège	16
9	(France) Franck Berrier	Zulte Waregem	14
10	(Belgium) Michy Batshuayi	Standard Liège	12
10	(Belgium) Tom De Sutter	Anderlecht	12
10	(Tunisia) Hamdi Harbaoui	Lokeren	12
10	(The Gambia) Mustapha Jarju	Mons	12
10	(Denmark) Nicklas Pedersen	Mechelen	12
10	(France) Jérémy Perbet	Mons	12

10 goals (2 players)

- (Israel) Lior Refaelov (Club Brugge)
- (Netherlands) Glynor Plet (Genk)

9 goals (6 players)

- (Iceland) Eiður Guðjohnsen (Club Brugge (3) & Cercle Brugge (6))
- (Belgium) Benjamin De Ceulaer (Genk (6) & Lokeren (3))
- (Bulgaria) Kostadin Hazurov (Lierse)
- (Belgium) Benjamin Mokulu (Lokeren)
- (Cameroon) Aloys Nong (Mons)
- (Belgium) Paul-Jose M'Poku (Standard Liège)

8 goals (5 players)

- (Serbia) Milan Jovanović (Anderlecht)
- (Nigeria) Chuka (OH Leuven)
- (Belgium) Karel Geraerts (OH Leuven)
- (Belgium) Yoni Buyens (Standard Liège)
- (Israel) Barak Badash (Waasland-Beveren)

7 goals (8 players)

- (Belgium) Massimo Bruno (Anderlecht)
- (Ukraine) Sacha Iakovenko (Anderlecht)
- (Norway) Mushaga Bakenga (Cercle Brugge)
- (France) Julien Gorius (Genk)
- (Argentina) Pablo Chavarría (Kortrijk)
- (France) Rachid Bourabia (Lierse)
- (Switzerland) Mijat Marić (Lokeren)
- (South Africa) Ayanda Patosi (Lokeren)

6 goals (10 players)

- (Belgium) Guillaume Gillet (Anderlecht)
- (Belgium) David Pollet (Charleroi)
- (Belgium) Giuseppe Rossini (Charleroi)
- (Israel) Elyaniv Barda (Genk)
- (Belgium) Christophe Lepoint (Gent (1) & Waasland-Beveren (5))
- (Serbia) Miloš Marić (Lokeren)
- (Belgium) Koen Persoons (Lokeren)
- (Uruguay) Nacho González (Standard Liège)
- (Central African Republic) Habib Habibou (Zulte Waregem)
- (Belgium) Jens Naessens (Zulte Waregem)

5 goals (15 players)

- (Argentina) Lucas Biglia (Anderlecht)
- (Argentina) Hernán Losada (Beerschot)
- (Belgium) Benito Raman (Beerschot)
- (Belgium) Vadis Odjidja-Ofoe (Club Brugge)
- (Belgium) Mohammed Tchité (Club Brugge)
- (France) Steeven Joseph-Monrose (Genk)
- (Senegal) Elimane Coulibaly (Gent (2) & Beerschot (3))
- (Belgium) Mustapha Oussalah (Kortrijk)
- (Bosnia and Herzegovina) Ervin Zukanović (Kortrijk)
- (Egypt) Mohamed El-Gabbas (Lierse)
- (Belgium) Nill De Pauw (Lokeren)
- (Ghana) Abdul-Yakuni Iddi (Mechelen)
- (Denmark) Mads Junker (Mechelen)
- (Israel) Shlomi Arbeitman (Mons (3) & Gent (2))
- (Cameroon) Christian Pouga (OH Leuven)

4 goals (20 players)

- (Brazil) Kanu (Anderlecht)
- (Belgium) Onur Kaya (Charleroi)
- (Netherlands) Ryan Donk (Club Brugge)
- (Belgium) Thomas Meunier (Club Brugge)
- (Belgium) Thomas Buffel (Genk)
- (Belgium) Hervé Kage (Gent (3) & Charleroi (1))
- (Cameroon) Ernest Nfor (Kortrijk)
- (France) Jérémy Taravel (Lokeren)
- (Senegal) Boubacar Dialiba (Mechelen)
- (Belgium) Steven De Petter (Mechelen)
- (Belgium) David Destorme (Mechelen)
- (Belgium) Seth de Witte (Mechelen)
- (Denmark) Thomas Enevoldsen (Mechelen)
- (Belgium) Robin Henkens (Mechelen)
- (Gabon) Frédéric Bulot (Standard Liège)
- (France) William Vainqueur (Standard Liège)
- (Belgium) Stijn De Smet (Waasland-Beveren)
- (Belgium) Jordan Remacle (Waasland-Beveren (2) & Gent (2))
- (Belgium) Davy De fauw (Zulte Waregem)
- (Belgium) Thorgan Hazard (Zulte Waregem)

3 goals (24 players)

- (United States) Sacha Kljestan (Anderlecht)
- (Argentina) Matías Suárez (Anderlecht)
- (Israel) Roei Dayan (Beerschot)
- (Serbia) Dalibor Veselinović (Beerschot)
- (Portugal) Rudy (Cercle Brugge)
- (Belgium) Lukas Van Eenoo (Cercle Brugge)
- (Belgium) Ziguy Badibanga (Charleroi)
- (Switzerland) Danijel Milićević (Charleroi)
- (Costa Rica) Óscar Duarte (Club Brugge)
- (Spain) Víctor Vázquez (Club Brugge)
- (Belgium) Björn Vleminckx (Club Brugge)
- (Belgium) Christian Benteke (Genk)
- (Trinidad and Tobago) Khaleem Hyland (Genk)
- (Belgium) Christian Brüls (Gent)
- (Ivory Coast) Yaya Soumahoro (Gent)
- (Belgium) Brecht Dejaegere (Kortrijk)
- (Serbia) Stefan Mitrović (Kortrijk)
- (Croatia) Ivan Leko (Lokeren)
- (France) Jérémy Sapina (Mons)
- (Iran) Reza Ghoochannejhad (Standard Liège)
- (Venezuela) Luis Seijas (Standard Liège)
- (Belgium) Jelle Van Damme (Standard Liège)
- (Belgium) Junior Malanda (Zulte Waregem)
- (North Macedonia) Aleksandar Trajkovski (Zulte Waregem)

2 goals (43 players)

- (Belgium) Olivier Deschacht (Anderlecht)
- (Belgium) Dennis Praet (Anderlecht)
- (Venezuela) Ronald Vargas (Anderlecht)
- (Republic of the Congo) Maël Lépicier (Beerschot (1) & Mons (1))
- (Belgium) Joachim Mununga (Beerschot)
- (Belgium) Stijn Wuytens (Beerschot)
- (Portugal) William Carvalho (Cercle Brugge)
- (Belgium) Bernt Evens (Cercle Brugge)
- (Belgium) Gregory Mertens (Cercle Brugge)
- (Belgium) Tim Smolders (Cercle Brugge)
- (Nigeria) Michael Uchebo (Cercle Brugge)
- (Belgium) Mohammed Aoulad (Charleroi)
- (Montenegro) Mijuško Bojović (Charleroi)
- (France) Harlem Gnohéré (Charleroi)
- (Ghana) Abraham Kumedor (Charleroi)
- (Ghana) Bennard Kumordzi (Genk)
- (Senegal) Kara Mbodj (Genk)
- (South Africa) Anele Ngcongca (Genk)
- (Spain) César Arzo (Gent)
- (Zambia) Rodgers Kola (Gent)
- (Spain) Jorge López (Gent)
- (Mali) Mamoutou N'Diaye (Gent)
- (Belgium) Hannes van der Bruggen (Gent)
- (Belgium) Gertjan De Mets (Kortrijk)
- (Serbia) Nebojša Pavlović (Kortrijk)
- (Belgium) Dolly Menga (Lierse)
- (Egypt) Ahmed Okka (Lierse)
- (Brazil) Junior Dutra (Lokeren)
- (Trinidad and Tobago) Sheldon Bateau (Mechelen)
- (Belgium) Arnor Angeli (Mons)
- (Belgium) Tim Matthys (Mons)
- (Democratic Republic of the Congo) Zola Matumona (Mons)
- (Belgium) Tom Van Imschoot (Mons)
- (Belgium) Alessandro Cerigioni (OH Leuven)
- (Iceland) Stefán Gíslason (OH Leuven)
- (Belgium) Evariste Ngolok (OH Leuven)
- (Belgium) Bjorn Ruytinx (OH Leuven)
- (Brazil) Augusto Da Silva (Waasland-Beveren)
- (Belgium) Benoît Ladrière (Waasland-Beveren)
- (Belgium) Wesley Sonck (Waasland-Beveren)
- (Guinea) Ibrahima Conté (Zulte Waregem (1) & Gent (1))
- (France) Jonathan Delaplace (Zulte Waregem)
- (Croatia) Ivan Lendrić (Zulte Waregem)

1 goal (82 players)

- (Sweden) Samuel Armenteros (Anderlecht)
- (Netherlands) Demy de Zeeuw (Anderlecht)
- (Senegal) Cheikhou Kouyaté (Anderlecht)
- (Netherlands) Bram Nuytinck (Anderlecht)
- (Hungary) Boldizsár Bodor (Beerschot)
- (France) Frédéric Brillant (Beerschot)
- (Belgium) Wim De Decker (Beerschot)
- (Belgium) Guillaume François (Beerschot)
- (Belgium) Conor Laerenbergh (Beerschot)
- (Belgium) Marvin Ogunjimi (Beerschot)
- (Belgium) Funso Ojo (Beerschot)
- (Belgium) Alpaslan Öztürk (Beerschot)
- (Uruguay) Joaquín Boghossian (Cercle Brugge)
- (Belgium) Frederik Boi (Cercle Brugge)
- (Belgium) Stephen Buyl (Cercle Brugge)
- (Ukraine) Oleg Iachtchouk (Cercle Brugge)
- (Belgium) Anthony Portier (Cercle Brugge)
- (Belgium) Igor Vetokele (Cercle Brugge)
- (Germany) Viktor Bopp (Charleroi)
- (Slovenia) Elvedin Džinić (Charleroi)
- (Senegal) Jamal Thiaré (Charleroi)
- (Belgium) Jonathan Blondel (Club Brugge)
- (Denmark) Jesper Jørgensen (Club Brugge)
- (North Macedonia) Ivan Tričkovski (Club Brugge)
- (Denmark) Niki Zimling (Club Brugge)
- (France) Kalidou Koulibaly (Genk)
- (Belgium) Anthony Limbombe (Genk)
- (Nigeria) Kim Ojo (Genk)
- (Belgium) Jeroen Simaeys (Genk)
- (Burundi) Valery Nahayo (Gent)
- (Belgium) Bernd Thijs (Gent)
- (Brazil) Wallace (Gent)
- (Belgium) Brecht Capon (Kortrijk)
- (Croatia) Mario Carević (Kortrijk)
- (Belgium) Thomas Matton (Kortrijk)
- (Democratic Republic of the Congo) Landry Mulemo (Kortrijk)
- (Egypt) Ahmed Abou Moslem (Lierse)
- (Belgium) Jason Adesanya (Lierse)
- (Morocco) Soufiane Bidaoui (Lierse)
- (Ethiopia) Saladin Said (Lierse)
- (Netherlands) Arjan Swinkels (Lierse)
- (Belgium) Julien Vercauteren (Lierse)
- (Spain) Walter Fernández (Lokeren)
- (Senegal) Ibrahima Gueye (Lokeren)
- (Belgium) Enes Sağlık (Lokeren)
- (Belgium) Maxime Biset (Mechelen)
- (Belgium) Alessandro Cordaro (Mechelen)
- (Belgium) Joachim Van Damme (Mechelen)
- (Belgium) Wannes Van Tricht (Mechelen)
- (France) Peter Franquart (Mons)
- (Belgium) Thomas Chatelle (Mons)
- (France) Grégory Lorenzi (Mons)
- (Belgium) Pieterjan Monteyne (Mons)
- (France) Benjamin Nicaise (Mons)
- (Belgium) Nicolas Timmermans (Mons)
- (Belgium) Thomas Azevedo (OH Leuven)
- (Belgium) Joren Dehond (OH Leuven)
- (Zimbabwe) Ovidy Karuru (OH Leuven)
- (Croatia) Tomislav Mikulić (OH Leuven)
- (Belgium) Wim Raymaekers (OH Leuven)
- (Brazil) Robson (OH Leuven)
- (Belgium) Kenneth Van Goethem (OH Leuven)
- (Belgium) Koen Weuts (OH Leuven)
- (Sweden) Astrit Ajdarević (Standard Liège)
- (Belgium) Dino Arslanagic (Standard Liège)
- (Israel) Maor Buzaglo (Standard Liège)
- (Israel) Dudu Biton (Standard Liège)
- (Belgium) Laurent Ciman (Standard Liège)
- (Belgium) Ibrahima Cissé (Standard Liège)
- (Haiti) Réginal Goreux (Standard Liège)
- (Brazil) Kanu (Standard Liège)
- (Belgium) Jurgen Cavens (Waasland-Beveren)
- (Mali) Kassim Doumbia (Waasland-Beveren)
- (Burundi) Dugary Ndabashinze (Waasland-Beveren)
- (England) Jonny Rowell (Waasland-Beveren)
- (France) Mikaël Seoudi (Waasland-Beveren)
- (Israel) Gal Shish (Waasland-Beveren)
- (Belgium) Karel D'Haene (Zulte Waregem)
- (Belgium) Bruno Godeau (Zulte Waregem)
- (Peru) Hernán Hinostroza (Zulte Waregem)
- (Iceland) Ólafur Ingi Skúlason (Zulte Waregem)
- (Belgium) Bryan Verboom (Zulte Waregem)

2 Own goals (2 players)

- (Belgium) Jelle Van Damme (Standard Liége, scored for Gent and Zulte Waregem)
- (Belgium) Bruno Godeau (Zulte Waregem, scored twice for Genk)

1 Own goal (15 players)

- (Belgium) Denis Odoi (Anderlecht, scored for Club Brugge)
- (Netherlands) Bram Nuytinck (Anderlecht, scored for Lokeren)
- (Poland) Marcin Wasilewski (Anderlecht, scored for Charleroi)
- (Belgium) Gregory Mertens (Cercle Brugge, scored for Mons)
- (Belgium) Anthony Portier (Cercle Brugge, scored for Genk)
- (Switzerland) Danijel Milićević (Charleroi, scored for Standard Liège)
- (Sweden) Michael Almebäck (Club Brugge, scored for Zulte Waregem)
- (Costa Rica) Óscar Duarte (Club Brugge, scored for Standard Liège)
- (Trinidad and Tobago) Khaleem Hyland (Genk, scored for Anderlecht)
- (Belgium) Derrick Tshimanga (Genk, scored for OH Leuven)
- (Spain) César Arzo (Gent, scored for Beerschot)
- (France) Baptiste Martin (Kortrijk, scored for Lierse)
- (Senegal) Ibrahima Gueye (Lokeren, scored for Lierse)
- (Switzerland) Mijat Marić (Lokeren, scored for Beerschot)
- (Netherlands) Bas Sibum (Waasland-Beveren, scored for Standard Liège)

=== Hat-tricks ===
Player	For	Against	Result	Date
(Democratic Republic of the Congo) Dieumerci Mbokani	Anderlecht	Cercle Brugge	3–0	12 August 2012
(Belgium) Maxime Lestienne	Club Brugge	Cercle Brugge	4–0	23 September 2012
(Central African Republic) Habib Habibou	Zulte Waregem	Lierse	4–1	29 September 2012
(Nigeria) Chuka	OH Leuven	Charleroi	4–0	6 October 2012
(The Gambia) Ibou	OH Leuven	Club Brugge	4–1	20 October 2012
(Belgium) Tom De Sutter	Anderlecht	Mechelen	4–1	3 November 2012
(France) Jérémy Perbet	Mons	OH Leuven	3–1	17 November 2012
(Belgium) Jelle Vossen	Genk	Lokeren	4–3	2 December 2012
(Democratic Republic of the Congo) Dieumerci Mbokani	Anderlecht	Mons	5–0	8 December 2012
(Belgium) Benjamin Mokulu	Lokeren	OH Leuven	6–2	19 January 2013
(Senegal) Mbaye Leye	Zulte Waregem	Club Brugge	4–3	18 April 2013
(Belgium) Paul-Jose M'Poku	Standard Liège	Gent	7–0	26 May 2013

== Attendances ==
No.	Club	Average attendance	Change	Highest
1	Club Brugge	24,433	1,1%	29,042
2	Anderlecht	20,675	-7,1%	22,500
3	Genk	20,590	-5,6%	24,750
4	Standard de Liège	20,415	-17,1%	25,000
5	Mechelen	10,159	-0,9%	11,500
6	Gent	10,090	-8,1%	12,012
7	Cercle Brugge	8,495	0,3%	13,499
8	Oud-Heverlee Leuven	8,006	10,0%	9,500
9	Zulte Waregem	7,691	3,4%	9,500
10	Beerschot	7,519	-2,4%	11,333
11	Kortrijk	7,202	3,9%	9,144
12	Charleroi	6,580	24,2%	11,153
13	Lierse	6,555	-19,0%	8,000
14	Sporting Lokeren	6,169	23,3%	8,000
15	Waasland-Beveren	5,916	61,2%	13,000
16	RAEC	4,162	-8,8%	8,150
