= 2011–12 Belgian Cup =

Tournament details
- Country: Belgium
- Teams: 293

Final positions
- Champions: Lokeren
- Runners-up: Kortrijk

Tournament statistics
- Matches played: 292

The 2011–12 Belgian Cup (also known as Cofidis Cup because of sponsoring purposes) is the 57th season of the main knockout football competition in Belgium. It commenced on 31 July 2011 with the first matches of Round 1 and concluded on 24 March 2012, which is exceptionally early, but was chosen to make sure all matches would be finished before the start of the UEFA Euro 2012 tournament. The winner of the competition qualifies for the play-off round of the 2012–13 UEFA Europa League.

Standard Liège were the defending champions.

== Competition modus ==
The competition consists of ten rounds. The first seven rounds were held as single-match elimination rounds. When tied after 90 minutes in the first three rounds, penalties were taken immediately. In rounds four to seven, when tied after 90 minutes first an extra time period of 30 minutes are played, then penalties would be taken if still necessary. The quarter- and semifinals were played in a two-leg modus, where the team winning on aggregate advances. The final was played as a single match.

Teams entered the competition in different rounds, based upon their 2010–11 league affiliation. Teams from the fourth-level Promotion or lower began in Round 1. Third Division teams entered in Round 3, with Second Division teams joining in the following round. Teams from the Belgian First Division entered in Round 6.

Round	Clubs remaining	Clubs involved	Winners from previous round	New entries this round	Leagues entering at this round
Round 1	293	223	none	223	Levels 4 to 8 in football league pyramid
Round 2	182	112	111 (+1 bye)	none	none
Round 3	126	92	56	36	Belgian Third Division
Round 4	80	64	46	18	Belgian Second Division
Round 5	48	32	32	none	none
Round 6	32	32	16	16	Belgian Pro League
Round 7	16	16	16	none	none
Quarter-Finals	8	8	8	none	none
Semifinals	4	4	4	none	none
Final	2	2	2	none	none

== Starting Rounds ==
The starting five rounds featured only teams of lower divisions and all matches were played during the summer and early autumn, mostly in July and August.

=== Round 1 ===
The matches will be played on 30 and 31 July 2011.

Tie no	Home team	Score	Away team
1	K.VK.Ieper (IV)	3–0	K.F.C.Langemark (P.I)
2	R.Knokke FC (P.I)	0–0 (p.) 2–4	OMS.Ingelmunster (P.I)
3	Football Club Gullegem (P.I)	3–2	K.SC.Blankenberge (P.I)
4	K.SV.De Ruiter Roeselare (P.I)	0–0 (p.) 4–3	K.FC.Sparta Petegem (IV)
5	K.VK.Avelgem (P.II)	0–2	Sporting W.I.Harelbeke (IV)
6	K.SK.Oostnieuwkerke (P.I)	1–5	K.FC.Izegem (IV)
7	K.SV.Rumbeke (P.I)	1–1 (p.) 2–3	K.SC.Wielsbeke (IV)
8	K.VC.Wingene (IV)	1–2	K.Sassport Boezinge (P.I)
9	Club Roeselare (P.I)	3–3 (p.) 4–5	KSK Maldegem (IV)
10	S.V.V.Damme (P.I)	0–1	SK.Eernegem (IV)
11	K.SV.Diksmuide (IV)	7–0	K.SV.Bredene (P.I)
12	H.O.Oostveld Oedelem (P.III)	1–4	K.BS.Poperinge (IV)
13	K.Sint-Eloois-Winkel Sp. (IV)	3–0	R.SC.Templeuvois (P.I)
14	K.SC.Menen (P.I)	4–0	FC.Brunehaut (P.II)
15	FC.Etoiles D'Ere-Allain (P.III)	1–4	K.FC.Varsenare (P.II)
16	R.RC.Gent-Zeehaven (IV)	1–1 (p.) 3–1	VC.K.Zwevegem Sport (P.I)
17	K.VV.Kl.Kemzeke (P.I)	1–1 (p.) 3–2	K.FC.Jong VL.Kruibeke (P.I)
18	K.VV.H.ende T. Zwijnaarde (P.IV)	2–4	K.Racing Club Bambrugge (P.I)
19	K.SV.Sottegem (P.I)	0–1	K.VK.Svelta Melsele (P.I)
20	K.Eendr.Opstal (P.I)	2–4	K.VV.Windeke (P.III)
21	K.FC.Eendr.Zele (P.I)	1–1 (p.) 4–3	K.FC.Merelbeke (P.I)
22	Rapide Club Lebbeke (P.I)	5–1	FC.Daknam (P.III)
23	K.SK.Lebbeke (P.II)	1–1 (p.) 5–3	K.FC.Sp.St-Gillis Waas (IV)
24	K.FC.Vrasene (P.II)	1–1 (p.) 5–6	K.E.Appelterre-Eichem (P.I)
25	SK.Terjoden-Welle (IV)	9–0	FC.Wieze (P.III)
26	SV.Voorde (P.I)	3–0	K.VC.Jong Lede (IV)
27	K.VK.Ninove (P.I)	1–1 (p.) 4–2	Verbroedering Meldert (IV)
28	SK.Berlare (IV)	4–0	SK.Denderhoutem (P.III)
29	R.AS.Saintoise (P.III)	1–2	VC.Kester (P.III)
30	K.SK.L.Ternat (IV)	2–1	K.Stade Bierbeek (P.I)
31	R.Léopold Uccle FC. (IV)	4–0	K.HO.Huizingen (P.III)
32	Dilbeek Sport (IV)	1–1 (p.) 5–3	K.FC.Wezembeek-Oppem (P.II)
33	R.FC.Evere (P.I)	3–0	R.Un.Auderghem (P.III)
34	Sp.Roosbeek (P.III)	0–0 (p.) 4–2	R.SD.Jette (P.I)
35	Tempo Overijse (IV)	0–0 (p.) 5–4	SK.St.P.Opwijk (P.I)
36	FC Ganshoren (IV)	7–0	R.AS.Jodoigne (P.III)
37	SK.Verbrande Brug (P.III)	0–3	R.CS.Brainois (P.I)
38	Voorwaarts Mollem (P.III)	0–3	K.Kampenhout SK. (IV)
39	K.CS.Machelen (P.III)	1–2	Racing Butsel (P.III)
40	K.Londerzeel SK. (IV)	3–1	FC.Saint-Michel (P.II)
41	K.FC.Duffel (IV)	4–0	K.SK. 'S Gravenwezel (P.I)
42	K.VV.Vosselaar (IV)	6–0	Veerle Sport (P.IV)
43	K.FC.St.-Lenaarts (IV)	3–2	Sp.Tisselt (P.II)
44	KFC.Oosterzonen Oosterw. (IV)	5–3	K.Gooreind VV. (P.I)
45	VV.Molenkring Lichtaart (P.III)	1–3	K.FC.Zwarte Leeuw (IV)
46	K.Berchem Sport 2004 (IV)	3–0	K.Nieuwmoer FC. (P.I)
47	K.Antonia FC. (P.I)	1–1 (p.) 0–3	K.Lyra TSV. (IV)
48	K.FC.Beekhoek Sport (P.III)	1–0	K.FC.Verbr.Arendonk (P.I)
49	K.FC.Lille (P.I)	0–1	FC.Ekeren (P.II)
50	K.Berg en Dal VV. (P.II)	2–3	R.Cappellen FC. (IV)
51	W.S. Schorvoort Turnhout (P.III)	0–3	K.Everbeur Sport Averbode (IV)
52	K.SK.Oelegem (P.IV)	1–3	K.FC.De Kempen T.L. (IV)
53	K.Witgoor Sport Dessel (IV)	1–0	K.Kalmthout SK. (P.III)
54	K.FC.Zoerle Sport (P.IV)	2–1	K.VVOG.Vorselaar (P.II)
55	FC.Berlaar-Heikant (P.II)	1–0	FC.Mariekerke (IV)
56	K.FC.Katelijne-Waver (IV)	4–0	K.FC.Broechem (P.III)

Tie no	Home team	Score	Away team
57	K.VV.Weerstand Koersel (P.I)	0–0 (p.) 1–4	K.ESK.Leopoldsburg (IV)
58	VV.Thes Sport Tessenderlo (P.I)	4–1	Waltwilder V.V. (P.I)
59	K.Lutlommel VV. (P.I)	2–0	K.Daring Huvo Jeuk (P.II)
60	K.Herk-De-Stad FC. (IV)	1–1 (p.) 3–4	RC.Hades (P.I)
61	K.Overpeltse VV. (IV)	1–0	K.Vlijtingen VV. (P.I)
62	K.VV.Verbr.Maasmechelen (P.II)	2–0	K.Zonhoven VV. (P.I)
63	Exc.Veldwezelt (IV)	11–1	SK.Rooierheide (P.II)
64	Lindelhoeven VV (P.I)	1–3	K.Esperanza Neerpelt (IV)
65	K.FC.Diest (P.I)	1–2	K.VK.Beringen (P.I)
66	Valencia VC.Piringen (P.IV)	0–4	Sparta Walshoutem (P.III)
67	K.Sporting Spalbeek (P.III)	0–1	K.VK.Wellen (P.I)
68	K.Sportclub Tongeren (IV)	0–0 (p.) 2–4	FC.Torpedo Hasselt (P.I)
69	K.VV.Heuden-Zolder (P.I)	0–4	Spouwen-Mopertingen (IV)
70	Groen Star Beek (P.I)	0–3	K.SK.Bree (IV)
71	US.Solrezienne (P.I)	3–1	US.Neufvilloise (P.II)
72	AS.Ghlinoise (P.III)	1–3	R.Soignies Sports (P.I)
73	R.FC.Sportif Marcinelle (P.II)	0–6	R.US.Genly-Quevy 89 (P.I)
74	U.St.Ghisl. Tertre-Hautr. (IV)	0–0 (p.) 4–5	FC.Rapid Symphorinois (P.I)
75	Club Olympic Trivières (P.II)	0–3	R.ES.Acrenoise (IV)
76	R.SC.Wasmes (P.III)	1–2	Espoir Cl. Erpion (P.III)
77	SC.Montigniesv (P.II)	2–0	Racing FC.Fosses (P.II)
78	R.FC.Bioul 81 (P.I)	5–2	Jeunesse Sportive De Bray (P.II)
79	FC.Charleroi (IV)	12–3	Union Sportive Walcourt (P.II)
80	US.De Pesche B (P.III)	0–1	R.FC.Houdinois (P.I)
81	Flavion Sport (P.III)	1–2	R.FC.Spy (P.I)
82	R.Chatelet SC. (P.II)	4–0	La R.U.Sambrevilloise (P.III)
83	R.Jeun.Aischoise (P.I)	2–0	K.FC.Weywertz (P.I)
84	R.U.S.Loyers (P.I)	1–6	R.RC.Hamoir (IV)
85	R.Arquet FC. (P.I)	1–2	R.Dar.Cl. de Cointe-Liège (P.I)
86	U.C.E. De Liège (P.III)	0–5	R.RC.Mormont (IV)
87	R.Spa FC (P.I)	2–1	RFC.Turkania Faymonville (IV)
88	R.FC.de Liège (IV)	1–0	R.FC.Vyle-Tharoul (P.I)
89	FC.Soumagne (P.III)	2–5	R.All.Mélen-Micheroux (P.II)
90	R.FC.Meux B (P.II)	bye	
91	R.Avenir Fouron FC. (P.II)	4–2	E.H.Braives (P.II)
92	R.CS.Profondeville (P.I)	2–0	R.Aywaille FC. (IV)
93	R.Etoile FC.Wegnez (P.III)	0–3	R.Ent.Blegnytoise (IV)
94	R.FC. 1912 Raeren (P.II)	1–4	R.Sprimont Comblain Sport (IV)
95	R.Harzé FC (P.III)	1–1 (p.) 4–3	R.FC.Sérésien (IV)
96	R.W.Walhain CG. (IV)	3–0	R.FC.Warnant (P.I)
97	R.Ent.Racing Club Amay (P.I)	1–1 (p.) 3–5	ET.Elsautoise (IV)
98	Union Royale Namur (IV)	1–5	R.All.FC.Oppagne-Wéris (P.I)
99	R.AF.Franchimontois (P.II)	0–2	R.FC.Meux A (IV)
100	AC.Milanello Vottem (P.III)	0–4	R.FC.Tilleur St.-Gilles (P.I)
101	R.CS.Libramontois (P.I)	1–3	R.Standard FC.Bièvre (IV)
102	R.OC.Rochois (P.I)	3–2	US.Beauraing 61 (P.I)
103	R.FC.Messancy (P.II)	3–2	Et.Sp.Bourcy (P.II)
104	R.U.St-G.Sinsin-Waillet (P.III)	0–4	ES.Wellinoise (P.I)
105	Football Club Bercheux (P.I)	3–1	SC.Mussy (P.II)
106	R.ES.Vaux (P.I)	1–0	R.U.S.Marbehan (P.II)
107	R.US.Givry (IV)	10–0	R.FC.Compogne Bertogne (P.II)
108	FC.Jeun.Lorr.Arlonaise (P.I)	6–1	Entente Sommenoise (P.II)
109	R.RC.Longlier (P.I)	0–2	JS.Habaysienne (IV)
110	R.ES.Champlonaise (P.I)	4–2	J.Rochefortoise Jemelle A (P.I)
111	ES.Chatillon (P.II)	2–5	R.US.Ethe Belmont (P.II)
112	R.U.Wallonne Ciney (IV)	7–0	R.ES.Aubange (P.II)

=== Round 2 ===
The matches will be played on 7 August 2011.

Tie no	Home team	Score	Away team
113	SK.Eernegem (IV)	2–0	Football Club Gullegem (P.I)
114	Sporting W.I.Harelbeke (IV)	2–0	K.SC.Wielsbeke (IV)
115	K.VK.Ieper (IV)	1–2	K.FC.Izegem (IV)
116	K.BS.Poperinge (IV)	2–0	K.SV.De Ruiter Roeselare (P.I)
117	K.Sint-Eloois-Winkel Sp. (IV)	1–0	K.FC.Varsenare (P.II)
118	K.SV.Diksmuide (IV)	2–2 (p.) 3–5	KSK Maldegem (IV)
119	K.Sassport Boezinge (P.I)	0–1	OMS.Ingelmunster (P.I)
120	R.RC.Gent-Zeehaven (IV)	0–0 (p.) 3–4	K.SC.Menen (P.I)
121	SK.Berlare (IV)	1–3	SK.Terjoden-Welle (IV)
122	K.VV.Kl.Kemzeke (P.I)	0–3	K.Racing Club Bambrugge (P.I)
123	K.VK.Svelta Melsele (P.I)	2–5	Rapide Club Lebbeke (P.I)
124	K.VK.Ninove (P.I)	3–1	K.SK.Lebbeke (P.II)
125	K.VV.Windeke (P.III)	3–2	K.FC.Eendr.Zele (P.I)
126	SV.Voorde (P.I)	1–2	K.E.Appelterre-Eichem (P.I)
127	K.Londerzeel SK. (IV)	0–1	R.Léopold Uccle FC. (IV)
128	K.SK.L.Ternat (IV)	1–1 (p.) 4–3	Dilbeek Sport (IV)
129	R.CS.Brainois (P.I)	0–3	FC Ganshoren (IV)
130	Tempo Overijse (IV)	0–0 (p.) 5–4	K.Kampenhout SK. (IV)
131	VC.Kester (P.III)	0–1	R.FC.Evere (P.I)
132	Racing Butsel (P.III)	2–0	Sp.Roosbeek (P.III)
133	FC.Ekeren (P.II)	0–2	K.Witgoor Sport Dessel (IV)
134	K.FC.Beekhoek Sport (P.III)	1–0	K.Lyra TSV. (IV)
135	K.FC.Katelijne-Waver (IV)	1–0	K.FC.Zwarte Leeuw (IV)
136	K.FC.De Kempen T.L. (IV)	1–2	K.Berchem Sport 2004 (IV)
137	R.Cappellen FC. (IV)	2–0	K.FC.Zoerle Sport (P.IV)
138	K.VV.Vosselaar (IV)	1–1 (p.) 8–9	K.Everbeur Sport Averbode (IV)
139	KFC.Oosterzonen Oosterw. (IV)	4–0	FC.Berlaar-Heikant (P.II)
140	K.FC.St.-Lenaarts (IV)	3–0	K.FC.Duffel (IV)

Tie no	Home team	Score	Away team
141	Sparta Walshoutem (P.III)	2–3	K.VK.Wellen (P.I)
142	K.Esperanza Neerpelt (IV)	1–0	K.VK.Beringen (P.I)
143	FC.Torpedo Hasselt (P.I)	0–5	RC.Hades (P.I)
144	Exc.Veldwezelt (IV)	4–0	VV.Thes Sport Tessenderlo (P.I)
145	K.ESK.Leopoldsburg (IV)	2–1	K.Lutlommel VV. (P.I)
146	K.SK.Bree (IV)	4–0	K.VV.Verbr.Maasmechelen (P.II)
147	K.Overpeltse VV. (IV)	2–3	Spouwen-Mopertingen (IV)
148	FC.Charleroi (IV)	0–0 (p.) 4–3	R.FC.Bioul 81 (P.I)
149	R.ES.Acrenoise (IV)	1–1 (p.) 5–4	R.FC.Spy (P.I)
150	US.Solrezienne (P.I)	3–0	SC.Montignies (P.II)
151	R.Chatelet SC. (P.II)	0–0 (p.) 4–5	Espoir Cl. Erpion (P.III)
152	R.Soignies Sports (P.I)	2–1	R.FC.Houdinois (P.I)
153	FC.Rapid Symphorinois (P.I)	2–1	R.US.Genly-Quevy 89 (P.I)
154	R.W.Walhain CG. (IV)	1–0	R.RC.Mormont (IV)
155	R.FC.Meux A (IV)	2–4	R.Avenir Fouron FC. (P.II)
156	R.Spa FC (P.I)	2–3	R.Dar.Cl. de Cointe-Liège (P.I)
157	R.FC.Meux B (P.II)	5–0	R.CS.Profondeville (P.I)
158	R.Harzé FC (P.III)	0–6	R.All.Mélen-Micheroux (P.II)
159	ET.Elsautoise (IV)	2–1	R.Jeun.Aischoise (P.I)
160	R.FC.de Liège (IV)	0–1	R.Ent.Blegnytoise (IV)
161	R.FC.Tilleur St.-Gilles (P.I)	0–6	R.Sprimont Comblain Sport (IV)
162	R.RC.Hamoir (IV)	4–1	R.All.FC.Oppagne-Wéris (P.I)
163	R.ES.Champlonaise (P.I)	7–0	Football Club Bercheux (P.I)
164	R.OC.Rochois (P.I)	3–0	R.ES.Vaux (P.I)
165	R.US.Ethe Belmont (P.II)	2–2 (p.) 1–3	ES.Wellinoise (P.I)
166	JS.Habaysienne (IV)	2–3	FC.Jeun.Lorr.Arlonaise (P.I)
167	R.FC.Messancy (P.II)	0–4	R.U.Wallonne Ciney (IV)
168	R.Standard FC.Bièvre (IV)	1–3	R.US.Givry (IV)

=== Round 3 ===
The matches will be played on 14 August 2011.

Tie no	Home team	Score	Away team
169	K.Racing Club Bambrugge (P.I)	4–0	KSK Maldegem (IV)
170	VW Hamme (III)	3–0	K.Berchem Sport 2004 (IV)
171	US.Solrezienne (P.I)	2–2 (p.) 6–7	K.FC.Beekhoek Sport (P.III)
172	Tournai (III)	1–0	RC.Hades (P.I)
173	Exc.Veldwezelt (IV)	1–0	R.Avenir Fouron FC. (P.II)
174	K.FC.Katelijne-Waver (IV)	1–1 (p.) 1–3	Torhout 1992 KM (III)
175	K.Esperanza Neerpelt (IV)	1–1 (p.) 4–2	Olympic Charleroi (III)
176	K.VV.Windeke (P.III)	0–1	K.S.C. Grimbergen (III)
177	Racing Mechelen (III)	1–0	FC Ganshoren (IV)
178	K.Sint-Eloois-Winkel Sp. (IV)	1–1 (p.) 4–5	Union SG (III)
179	SK.Terjoden-Welle (IV)	3–1	K.SK.Bree (IV)
180	Spouwen-Mopertingen (IV)	1–1 (p.) 4–5	FC.Bleid-Gaume (III)
181	K.S.V. Bornem (III)	2–2 (p.) 3–4	FC.Charleroi (IV)
182	OMS.Ingelmunster (P.I)	0–1	K.V. Woluwe-Zaventem (III)
183	Espoir Cl. Erpion (P.III)	0–5	K.SC.Menen (P.I)
184	R.Geants Athois (III)	2–1	K.BS.Poperinge (IV)
185	KFC.Oosterzonen Oosterw. (IV)	1–6	Heppig.-Lambusart-Fleurus (III)
186	R.Cappellen FC. (IV)	4–1	R.Sprimont Comblain Sport (IV)
187	K.Witgoor Sport Dessel (IV)	2–2 (p.) 4–5	R.C.S. Verviétois (III)
188	Ronse (III)	4–0	R.FC.Evere (P.I)
189	K.VK.Wellen (P.I)	4–4 (p.) 3–4	K.S.K. Hasselt (III)
190	R.ES.Acrenoise (IV)	1–3	Rupel Boom (III)
191	K.FC.St.-Lenaarts (IV)	0–0 (p.) 4–5	Turnhout (III)

Tie no	Home team	Score	Away team
192	ET.Elsautoise (IV)	1–2	Hoogstraten V.V. (III)
193	R.F.C. Huy (III)	2–0	K.Everbeur Sport Averbode (IV)
194	Mouscron-Peruwelz (III)	2–0	K.ESK.Leopoldsburg (IV)
195	SK.Eernegem (IV)	1–3	R.Ent.Bertrigeoise (III)
196	R.US.Genly-Quevy 89 (P.I)	0–0 (p.) 6–5	R.US.Givry (IV)
197	Sporting W.I.Harelbeke (IV)	2–2 (p.) 4–2	K.V.V. Coxyde (III)
198	URS Centre (III)	0–0 (p.) 0–3	R.Dar.Cl. de Cointe-Liège (P.I)
199	ES.Wellinoise (P.I)	1–0	R.Soignies Sports (P.I)
200	K.S.V. Temse (III)	2–0	R.ES.Champlonaise (P.I)
201	R.ES.Vaux (P.I)	1–6	R.W.Walhain CG. (IV)
202	Rapide Club Lebbeke (P.I)	0–2	K.Bocholter VV. (III)
203	K.Patro Eisden Maasmech. (III)	4–2	Racing Butsel (P.III)
204	Tempo Overijse (IV)	1–1 (p.) 4–3	Racing Waregem (III)
205	K.VK.Ninove (P.I)	0–2	R.FC.Union La Calamine (III)
206	K.E.Appelterre-Eichem (P.I)	2–0	K.Olsa Brakel (III)
207	Dessel Sport (III)	1–0	R.Ent.Blegnytoise (IV)
208	R.CS.Profondeville (P.I)	1–4	Oudenaarde (III)
209	R.RC.Hamoir (IV)	1–3	K.Olympia SC.Wijgmaal (III)
210	R.Léopold Uccle FC. (IV)	5–4	K.FC.Izegem (IV)
211	Diegem (III)	1–0	K.SK.L.Ternat (IV)
212	FC.Jeun.Lorr.Arlonaise (P.I)	2–6	Deinze (III)
213	Virton (III)	2–4	R.All.Mélen-Micheroux (P.II)
214	R.U.Wallonne Ciney (IV)	3–5	Verbroed.Geel-Meerhout (III)

=== Round 4 ===
The matches were played during the weekend of 21 August 2011.

Team 1	Score	Team 2
K.V. Woluwe-Zaventem (III)	1–4	Virton (III)
Union SG (III)	0–1 (a.e.t)	Oostende (II)
R.FC.Union La Calamine (III)	0–3	R.US.Genly-Quevy 89 (P.I)
K.S.K. Hasselt (III)	0–5 FF	Antwerp (II)
Standaard Wetteren (II)	4–1	K.Olympia SC.Wijgmaal (III)
Charleroi (II)	3–1	K.E.Appelterre-Eichem (P.I)
R.Dar.Cl. de Cointe-Liège (P.I)	0–2	R.Cappellen FC. (IV)
K.Racing Club Bambrugge (P.I)	0–3	WS Woluwe (II)
Dessel Sport (III)	6–0	R.F.C. Huy (III)
R.Léopold Uccle FC. (IV)	1–2	Ronse (III)
Roeselare (II)	2–1	Torhout 1992 KM (III)
K.Esperanza Neerpelt (IV)	1–0	Eendracht Aalst (II)
K.Patro Eisden Maasmech. (III)	4–0	K.S.C. Grimbergen (III)
K.SC.Menen (P.I)	2–3	VW Hamme (III)
FC.Bleid-Gaume (III)	0–5	Visé (II)
Deinze (III)	1–0	Tempo Overijse (IV)
Racing Mechelen (III)	8–0	ES.Wellinoise (P.I)
Heppig.-Lambusart-Fleurus (III)	0–1	Tienen (II)
FC.Charleroi (IV)	2–1	R.W.Walhain CG. (IV)
SK.Terjoden-Welle (IV)	2–2 (a.e.t) (p 2–4)	Tubize (II)
Hoogstraten V.V. (III)	4–4 (a.e.t) (p 4–2)	Dender EH (II)
Tournai (III)	3–1	FC Brussels (II)
Rupel Boom (III)	3–0	Boussu Dour (II)
K.S.V. Temse (III)	4–1	Oudenaarde (III)
R.Geants Athois (III)	6–0	K.FC.Beekhoek Sport (P.III)
Sporting W.I.Harelbeke (IV)	3–1 (a.e.t)	R.C.S. Verviétois (III)
Exc.Veldwezelt (IV)	1–2	Lommel United (II)
Waasland-Beveren (II)	3–1	Verbroed.Geel-Meerhout (III)
K.Bocholter VV. (III)	2–3	Sportkring Sint-Niklaas (II)
R.Ent.Bertrigeoise (III)	0–1	Eupen (II)
Turnhout (III)	2–0	Diegem (III)
Heist (II)	2–3	Mouscron-Peruwelz (III)

=== Round 5 ===
The matches took place on 28 August 2011.

Team 1	Score	Team 2
Visé (II)	0–2 (a.e.t)	Oostende (II)
Eupen (II)	8–0	R.US.Genly-Quevy 89 (P.I)
Tubize (II)	2–1	Virton (III)
Deinze (III)	2–1	Sportkring Sint-Niklaas (II)
Waasland-Beveren (II)	4–2	VW Hamme (III)
Antwerp (II)	6–0	FC.Charleroi (IV)
Mouscron-Peruwelz (III)	2–0	Tienen (II)
Roeselare (II)	1–0	Tournai (III)
K.Patro Eisden Maasmech. (III)	1–2	Dessel Sport (III)
Lommel United (II)	2–0	K.Esperanza Neerpelt (IV)
WS Woluwe (II)	0–2	Ronse (III)
Racing Mechelen (III)	3–1	K.S.V. Temse (III)
R.Cappellen FC. (IV)	0–2	Rupel Boom (III)
R.Geants Athois (III)	2–0	Sporting W.I.Harelbeke (IV)
Charleroi (II)	1–2	Turnhout (III)
Hoogstraten V.V. (III)	3–2	Standaard Wetteren (II)

== Final Stages ==
=== Round 6 ===
The draw for round 6 was made on 23 August 2011, whereas the matches took place on 20 and 21 September 2011.

20 September 2011	Kortrijk	1–1 (a.e.t.) (6−5 p)	Antwerp	Kortrijk
20:30 CEST	Joseph-Monrose 56'		Dosunmu 30'	Stadium: Guldensporen Stadion
	Penalties
	Chavarría (penalty scored); Zukanović (penalty scored); De Mets (penalty scored); Messoudi (penalty missed); Martin (penalty scored); Capon (penalty scored); N'Diaye (penalty scored)		Oris (penalty scored); Dunković (penalty scored); Van Geele (penalty missed); Chergui (penalty scored); Viane (penalty scored); De Smet (penalty scored); Pollemans (penalty missed)

20 September 2011	Tubize	0–3	Mons	Tubize
20:30 CEST			Sapina 12'; Camargo 28' (o.g.); Makiese 79'	Stadium: Stade Leburton

21 September 2011	Hoogstraten	2–8	Standard Liège	Liège ^{1}
20:00 CEST	Mathyssen 21'; Fockaert 25'		Tchité 23', 28', 37'; Van Damme 31'; Nong 44', 71'; Buyens 67'; Seijas 68'	Stadium: Stade Maurice Dufrasne

21 September 2011	Beerschot	1–1 (a.e.t.) (4−3 p)	Mouscron-Peruwelz	Antwerp
20:00 CEST	Dayan 54'		Dog 21'	Stadium: Olympisch Stadion
	Penalties
	Kagelmacher (penalty scored); Porokara (penalty missed); Dayan (penalty scored); Losada (penalty scored); Goor (penalty scored)		Broccolicchi (penalty scored); Provoost (penalty missed); Felix (penalty scored); Morjean (penalty scored); Mezine (penalty missed)

21 September 2011	Ronse	0–6	Zulte Waregem	Waregem ^{1}
20:00 CEST			Rossini 33', 64'; Habibou 76', 90+1'; Trajkovski 89'; Serwy 90+3'	Stadium: Regenboogstadion

21 September 2011	Lokeren	3–0	Eupen	Lokeren
20:30 CEST	De Ceulaer 21', 64'; Harbaoui 83'			Stadium: Daknamstadion

21 September 2011	Oostende	0–3	Mechelen	Ostend
20:30 CEST			Oliveira 41', 68'; Destorme 88'	Stadium: Albertpark

21 September 2011	Gent	4–0	Roeselare	Ghent
20:30 CEST	Jørgensen 22'; Conté 45'; Soumahoro 52'; Melli 87'			Stadium: Jules Ottenstadion

21 September 2011	Sint-Truiden	3–0	Waasland-Beveren	Sint-Truiden
20:30 CEST	Ghoochannejhad 42' (pen.); Schouterden 44'; Taelemans 53'			Stadium: Staaienveld

21 September 2011	OH Leuven	1–2	Rupel Boom	Heverlee
20:30 CEST	Remacle 74' (pen.)		Ventose 34' (pen.), 43' (pen.)	Stadium: Den Dreef

21 September 2011	Dessel Sport	2–3	Club Brugge	Dessel
20:30 CEST	Asubonteng 15' (pen.); Benassar 29'		Blondel 70', 81'; Meunier 83'	Stadium: Lorzestraat

21 September 2011	Turnhout	0–1	Lierse	Lier ^{1}
20:30 CEST			El-Gabbas 60' (pen.)	Stadium: Herman Vanderpoortenstadion

21 September 2011	Westerlo	1–0	Ath	Westerlo
20:30 CEST	Arbeitman 76'			Stadium: Het Kuipje

21 September 2011	Cercle Brugge	1–0	RC Mechelen	Bruges
20:30 CEST	Iachtchouk 79'			Stadium: Jan Breydel Stadium

21 September 2011	Deinze	2–6	Genk	Deinze
20:30 CEST	Van Mieghem 58'; Iakovlevski 72'		Vossen 3', 61'; Simaeys 14'; Hyland 38'; Limbombe 48'; Nwanganga 79'	Stadium: Burgemeester Van de Wiele Stadion

21 September 2011	Lommel United	0–4	Anderlecht	Lommel
20:45 CEST			Kanu 8'; Juhász 30'; De Sutter 48'; Vargas 84' (pen.)	Stadium: Soevereinstadion

Notes

- Note 1: Lierse, Standard and Zulte Waregem bought home advantage from their opponents as they were originally drawn away.

=== Round 7 ===
The draw for round 7 was made on 23 August 2011, whereas the matches took place on 26 October 2011.

26 October 2011	Zulte Waregem	1–2	Standard Liège	Waregem
20:00 CEST	Sivakov 67'		Van Damme 45+1'; González 90' (pen.)	Stadium: Regenboogstadion; Referee: Laurent Colemonts

26 October 2011	Kortrijk	1–0	Sint-Truiden	Kortrijk
20:30 CEST	Nfor 50'			Stadium: Guldensporen Stadion; Referee: Christof Virant

26 October 2011	Genk	0–2	Lierse	Genk
20:30 CEST			Huysegems 28'; Marić 55'	Stadium: Cristal Arena; Referee: Christophe Delacour

26 October 2011	Cercle Brugge	0–1 (a.e.t.)	Beerschot	Bruges
20:30 CEST			Rojas 108'	Stadium: Jan Breydel Stadium; Referee: Frederik Geldhof

26 October 2011	Mons	1–0	Mechelen	Mons
20:30 CEST	Sapina 58'			Stadium: Stade Charles Tondreau; Referee: Frank De Bleeckere

26 October 2011	Lokeren	3–1	Westerlo	Lokeren
20:30 CEST	Marić 40' (pen.); Finnbogason 80', 84'		Wils 25' (pen.)	Stadium: Daknamstadion; Referee: Luc Wouters

26 October 2011	Anderlecht	1–2	Rupel Boom	Brussels
20:30 CEST	Praet 89'		De Smedt 32'; Mertens 83'	Stadium: Constant Vanden Stock Stadium; Referee: Wim Smet

26 October 2011	Gent	4–4 (a.e.t.) (4−2 p)	Club Brugge	Ghent
20:45 CEST	Coulibaly 8', 48'; Soumahoro 76'; Thijs 81'		Zimling 19'; Dirar 44'; Donk 45+2'; Vleminckx 90+2'	Stadium: Jules Ottenstadion; Referee: Alexandre Boucaut
	Penalties
	Thijs (penalty scored); Jørgensen (penalty scored); Mboyo (penalty missed); Brüls (penalty scored); Melli (penalty scored)		Vázquez (penalty scored); Zimling (penalty scored); Refaelov (penalty missed); Vleminckx (penalty missed)

=== Quarter-finals ===
The draw for the quarter- and semifinals took place on October 28, 2011. The matches were played over two legs on 21 December 2011 (leg 1) and 18 January 2012 (leg 2).

==== First legs ====
21 December 2011	Lierse	1–2	Standard Liège	Lier
20:30 CET	Bidaoui 48'		Batshuayi 12', 30'	Stadium: Herman Vanderpoortenstadion; Referee: Geldhof

21 December 2011	Kortrijk	2–0	Beerschot	Kortrijk
20:30 CET	Zukanović 81'; Messoudi 84'			Stadium: Guldensporen Stadion; Attendance: 5000; Referee: Vervecken

21 December 2011	Mons	3–1	Rupel Boom	Mons
20:30 CET	Perbet 37', 59'; Ibou 71'		De Smedt 90+3'	Stadium: Stade Charles Tondreau; Attendance: 1900; Referee: Delacour

21 December 2011	Lokeren	1–1	Gent	Lokeren
20:45 CET	Mokulu 1'		El Ghanassy 22'	Stadium: Daknamstadion; Attendance: 4404; Referee: Nzolo

==== Second legs ====
18 January 2012	Standard Liège	2–4 (a.e.t.) (4–5 agg.)	Lierse	Liège
20:30 CET	Vainqueur 84'; Marić 119' (o.g.)	Report	Marić 67'; Grnčarov 90+1'; Bidaoui 100'; Adesanya 120'	Stadium: Stade Maurice Dufrasne; Attendance: 4,500; Referee: Delacour

18 January 2012	Gent	3–3 (4–4a agg.)	Lokeren	Ghent
20:30 CET	Smolders 6' (pen.); Coulibaly 84'; El Ghanassy 90+1'	Report	Marić 33' (pen.); Patosi 50'; Persoons 87'	Stadium: Jules Ottenstadion; Attendance: 7,395; Referee: Gumienny

18 January 2012	Beerschot	2–1 (2–3 agg.)	Kortrijk	Antwerp
20:30 CET	Dayan 9'; Mikulić 55'	Report	Veselinović 67'	Stadium: Olympisch Stadion; Attendance: 3,343; Referee: Nzolo

18 January 2012	Rupel Boom	2–2 (3–5 agg.)	Mons	Boom
20:30 CET	Pellegriti 81'; Beyens 89'	Report	Ibou 12'; Perbet 50'	Stadium: Gemeentelijk Parkstadion; Attendance: 2,000; Referee: Van de Velde

=== Semi-finals ===
The semifinals were also two-legged.

==== First legs ====
31 January 2012	Lokeren	1–0	Lierse	Lokeren
20:45	Taravel 57'			Stadium: Daknamstadion; Referee: Sébastien Delferière

1 February 2012	Mons	1–2	Kortrijk	Mons
20:30	Lépicier 87'		Joseph-Monrose 62'; Messoudi 90'	Stadium: Stade Charles Tondreau; Attendance: 3,000; Referee: Luc Wouters

==== Second legs ====
8 February 2012	Kortrijk	2–2 (4–3 agg.)	Mons	Kortrijk
20:30	Joseph-Monrose 33'; Sapina 37' (o.g.)		Perbet 8'; Martin 47' (o.g.)	Stadium: Guldensporen Stadion; Referee: Serge Gumienny

22 February 2012	Lierse	0–3 (0–4 agg.)	Lokeren	Lier
18:30			De Pauw 38', 83'; Persoons 42'	Stadium: Herman Vanderpoortenstadion; Referee: Johan Verbist

=== Final ===
24 March 2012
20:30 CET

Lokeren	1–0	Kortrijk
Harbaoui 77'

King Baudouin Stadium, Brussels
Referee: Jérôme Efong Nzolo

== See also ==
- 2011–12 Belgian Pro League
