= 2012–13 Belgian Cup =

Tournament details
- Country: Belgium
- Teams: 292

Final positions
- Champions: Genk
- Runners-up: Cercle Brugge

Tournament statistics
- Matches played: 297
- Goals scored: 1,073 (3.61 per match)

The 2012–13 Belgian Cup (also known as Cofidis Cup for sponsorship purposes) was the 58th season of the main knockout football competition in Belgium. It commenced on 25 July 2012 with the first matches of Round 1 and ended on 9 May 2013. Genk defeated Cercle Brugge 2–0 in the final, therefore qualifying for the play-off round of the 2013–14 UEFA Europa League.

Lokeren were the defending champions, but they were knocked out of the cup by Gent after losing out on penalty kicks in the round of 16.

== Competition format ==
The competition consists of ten rounds. The first seven rounds are held as single-match elimination rounds. When tied after 90 minutes in the first three rounds, penalties are taken immediately. In rounds four to seven, when tied after 90 minutes first an extra time period of 30 minutes are played, then penalties are taken if still necessary. The quarter- and semifinals will be played over two legs, where the team winning on aggregate advances. The final will be played as a single match.

Teams enter the competition in different rounds, based upon their 2011–12 league affiliation. Teams from the fourth-level Promotion or lower began in Round 1. Third Division teams entered in Round 3, with Second Division teams joining in the following round. Teams from the Belgian First Division enter in Round 6.

Round	Clubs remaining	Clubs involved	Winners from previous round	New entries this round	Leagues entering at this round
Round 1	292	222	none	222	Levels 4 to 8 in football league pyramid
Round 2	182	112	110 (+2 bye)	none	none
Round 3	126	92	56	36	Belgian Third Division
Round 4	80	64	46	18	Belgian Second Division
Round 5	48	32	32	none	none
Round 6	32	32	16	16	Belgian Pro League
Round 7	16	16	16	none	none
Quarter-Finals	8	8	8	none	none
Semi-Finals	4	4	4	none	none
Final	2	2	2	none	none

== Preliminary rounds ==
The starting five rounds featured only teams of lower divisions and all matches were played during the summer and early autumn, mostly in July and August. The Roman numeral in brackets denotes the tier in which each team plays. Teams with no numeral next to their name play in tiers 6 to 8.

=== Round 1 ===
Round 1 matches were played on 25, 26, 28 and 29 July 2012, and included teams from tiers 4 to 8 in the Belgian league system.

Tie no	Home team	Score	Away team
1	K.BS.Poperinge (IV)	1–0	K.Sassport Boezinge (V)
2	S.K.Westrozebeke	0–4	K.VK.Ieper (IV)
3	Davo Westende	1–1 (p.) 3–4	K.SC.Blankenberge
4	VC.K.Zwevegem Sport (V)	1–3	K.SV.De Ruiter Roeselare (V)
5	K.SC.Wielsbeke (V)	2–1	K.VC.Wingene (V)
6	K.De Noordstar Heule	4–0	K.SV.Rumbeke (V)
7	Sporting West Harelbeke (IV)	3–6	Olympic de Warcoing (V)
8	SVD.Kortemark	1–3	K.Sint-Eloois-Winkel Sport (IV)
9	R.Knokke FC.	4–5	SK.Eernegem (IV)
10	OMS.Ingelmunster (IV)	1–2	S.V.V.Damme (V)
11	K.SK.Oostnieuwkerke (V)	0–1	R.SC.Templeuvois (IV)
12	K.FC.Lendelede Sport	0–0 (p.) 5–6	K.SC.Menen (IV)
13	R.US.Herseautoise Sp.	3–2	K.SV.Diksmuide (V)
14	Club Roeselare (V)	2–2 (p.) 3–5	K.FC.Langemark
15	K.SV.Geraardsbergen (V)	0–2	R.RC.Gent-Zeehaven (IV)
16	SK.Berlare (IV)	2–1	AC.Anvaing
17	R.US.Beloeil (V)	2–2 (p.) 3–4	K.SK.Maldegem (IV)
18	K.FC.Vrasene	1–1 (p.) 2–3	U.St-Ghislane-Tertre-Hautrage (IV)
19	SV.Ressegem	0–7	R.RC.Wetteren-Kwatrecht (V)
20	J.U.S.Maubray	1–2	VC.Eendracht Houtem
21	K.SK.De Jeugd Lovendegem (V)	1–2	Thor Kokerij-Meldert (IV)
22	SK.Terjoden-Welle (IV)	1–1 (p.) 4–5	Rapide Club Lebbeke (V)
23	K.Eendracht Opstal (V)	1–1 (p.) 2–4	K.E.Appelterre-Eichem (IV)
24	K.V.Eendracht Aalter	0–5	K.FC.Merelbeke (V)
25	K.FC.Sparta Petegem (IV)	3–0	K.FC.Sporting Sint-Gillis Waas (V)
26	SV.Voorde (V)	3–3 (p.) 4–2	K.FC.Eendracht Zele (IV)
27	K.VC.Jong Lede (IV)	14–1	Ertvelde United
28	R.FC Tournai (IV)	3–0	K.VV.Klauwaerts Kemzeke (V)
29	K.SK.Lebbeke (V)	2–2 (p.) 4–2	K.Racing Club Bambrugge (V)
30	K.VV.Zelzate (V)	1–4	R.ES.Acrenoise (IV)
31	K.Eendracht FC.Zoersel	1–1 (p.) 5–3	K.FC.Poppel
32	K.Retie SK.	2–1	K.FC.Katelijne-Waver (IV)
33	K.FC.O.Wilrijk (V)	0–1	K.FC.Duffel (IV)
34	VC.Herentals (V)	1–0	K.VV.Vosselaar (IV)
35	SV.Grasheide	0–2	FC.Turnhout
36	K.FC.De Kempen T.L (V)	3–0	K.FC.Putte
37	KFC.Oosterzonen Oosterwijk (IV)	1–2	K.FC.Zwarte Leeuw (V)
38	K.Sint-Job FC. (V)	1–0	FC.Mariekerke (V)
39	K.Nieuwmoer FC.	0–2	Merksem-Antwerp Noord SC. (IV)
40	K.Witgoor Sport Dessel (IV)	3–0	K.VVOG.Vorselaar
41	FC.Turkuaz Antwerpen	1–4	K.SK.Wavria
42	K.Lyra TSV. (IV)	4–1	K.VK.Svelta Melsele (V)
43	K.Ternesse VV.Wommelgem (IV)	4–1	K.FC.Jong VL.Kruibeke (V)
44	K.VC.Houtvenne (V)	2–2 (p.) 1–4	K.FC.Sint-Lenaarts (IV)
45	SC.Beauvechain	4–3	K.FC.Wambeek
46	R.RC.D'Etterbeek (V)	0–2	Sporting Eizeringen
47	K.Stade Bierbeek (V)	2–3	FC.Pepingen (V)
48	Racing Butsel	7–1	FC.Eendracht Kapelle-Op-Den-Bos
49	Tempo Overijse (IV)	6–0	Lubbeek Sint-Martinus Sport (V)
50	K.FC.Herent	3–2	Dilbeek Sport (IV)
51	VC.Bekkevoort	bye	
52	VK.Holsbeek	0–5	R.Léopold Uccle FC. (IV)

Tie no	Home team	Score	Away team
53	SK.Leeuw	1–1 (p.) 6–7	FC Ganshoren (IV)
54	Crossing Schaerbeek Evere (V)	0–0 (p.) 4–3	K.Londerzeel SK. (IV)
55	RC.De Schaerbeek (V)	1–3	K.SK.L.Ternat (IV)
56	K.Olympia SC.Wijgmaal (IV)	2–2 (p.) 2–4	FC.Suryoyes Bruxellois
57	K.SK.Halle (IV)	8–2	FC.Moorsel
58	VK.Liedekerke	1–0	K.Kampenhout SK. (IV)
59	K.Everbeur Sport Averbode (IV)	3–1	Herk Sport Hasselt
60	K.VK.Wellen (V)	1–1 (p.) 4–5	K.VV.Weerstand Koersel (V)
61	FC.Landen (V)	1–2	K.Esperanza Neerpelt (IV)
62	K.Zonhoven VV. (V)	2–2 (p.) 3–5	K.Vlijtingen VV. (V)
63	K.Herk-De-Stad FC. (V)	0–4	Spouwen-Mopertingen (IV)
64	K.VK.Beringen (V)	5–0	K.Standard Elen
65	K.ESK.Leopoldsburg (IV)	2–2 (p.) 5–4	SK.Moelingen (V)
66	K.Overpeltse VV. (IV)	2–2 (p.) 3–2	Sporting Landen
67	FC.Torpedo Hasselt (V)	2–1	K.FC.Ham United
68	FC.Melosport Zonhoven	2–2 (p.) 3–5	Excelsior Veldwezelt (IV)
69	K.Lutlommel VV. (IV)	2–1	K.Verbr.Balen
70	K.Sportclub Tongeren (V)	3–0	Eendracht Termien (V)
71	K.SK.Hasselt (IV)	6–0	Kadijk SK.Overpelt
72	K.SK.Bree (IV)	3–2	RC.Hades (V)
73	R.OC.de Charleroi-March. (IV)	3–1	R.FC.Bioul 81 (V)
74	R.Arquet FC. (V)	1–6	FC.Charleroi (IV)
75	R.Léopold Club Mesvinois	2–2 (p.) 5–4	Espoir Cl. Erpion
76	FC.Ligny	3–3 (p.) 3–5	SC.Montignies
77	R.US.Genly-Quevy 89 (IV)	6–0	Royal Baileux Sport
78	FC.Malonne 2000 II	0–4	Sp.Espoir Jemeppe (V)
79	R.FC.Spy (V)	2–0	FC.Somzée
80	RJ Entente Binchoise (V)	2–2 (p.) 4–5	CS.Entité Manageoise (V)
81	US.Solrezienne (V)	1–3	R.W.Walhain CG. (IV)
82	CS.Onhaye (V)	2–0	Trazegnies Sports
83	R.FC.Farciennes	2–6	R.SP.Bosquetia Frameries
84	CS.Bossièrois	0–9	Union Royale Namur (IV)
85	Pont-A Celles-Buzet	1–2	R.FC.Meux (IV)
86	R.ES.Couvin-Mariembourg (V)	4–1	R.Jeun.Aischoise (V)
87	FC.Malonne 2000	1–3	JS.Taminoise (IV)
88	R.U.S.Loyers (V)	bye	
89	AC.Milanello Herstal	0–2	R.CS.Verlaine
90	R.FC.Warnant (V)	4–0	R.CS.Xhorisien
91	FC.Soumagne	0–4	R.FC.Tilleur St.-Gilles (V)
92	Cité Sport Grace-Hollogne (IV)	8–0	U.C.E. De Liège
93	R.FC.Vyle-Tharoul (V)	0–4	R.Sprimont Comblain Sport (IV)
94	R.FC.Hannutois	2–0	R.Flemalle FC.
95	R.CS.Jalhaytois	0–2	Stade Disonais (V)
96	R.Ent.Blegnytoise (IV)	0–1	R.FC. 1912 Raeren (V)
97	R.Skill FC.D'Ivoz-Ramet	3–4	R.RC.Hamoir (IV)
98	R.Stade Waremmien FC. (V)	1–1 (p.) 3–5	RFC.Turkania Faymonville (IV)
99	E.H.Braives	0–4	R.Aywaille FC. (IV)
100	FC.Jupille	0–4	R.FC.de Liège (IV)
101	J.Rochefortoise Jemelle A (V)	0–2	Un.R.St-Louis-Saint-Léger (V)
102	FC.Vencimontois	2–4	R.OC.Rochois (V)
103	R.RC.Longlier (V)	4–0	R.ES.Vaux (V)
104	Un.St.André Ochamps	2–5	R.All.FC.Oppagne-Wéris (V)
105	ES.Wellinoise	0–2	R.OC.Meix-Dt-Virton (V)
106	R.US.Givry (IV)	4–1	R.CS.Libramontois (V)
107	ES.De Saint-Pierre	0–3	R.RC.Mormont (IV)
108	US.Beauraing 61 (V)	4–1	R.US.Ethe Belmont (V)
109	US.Waha	1–3	R.SC.Habay-La-Neuve
110	R.US.Gouvy	0–5	R.Standard FC.Bièvre (IV)
111	R.US.Sartoise (V)	2–1	R.RAC.Athl.Florenvillois (V)
112	R.ES.Champlonaise (V)	2–2 (p.) 4–5	FC.Jeun.Lorr.Arlonaise (IV)

112 teams progressed to the next round, of which 53 came from the Promotion league (tier 4), 37 came from the top Provinciaal leagues (tier 5) and 22 came from the lower Provinicaal leagues (tiers 6 to 8).

=== Round 2 ===
The matches were played on 3, 4 and 5 August 2012.

Tie no	Home team	Score	Away team
113	K.VK.Ieper (IV)	6–2	Olympic de Warcoing (V)
114	SK.Eernegem (IV)	0–5	K.Sint-Eloois-Winkel Sport (IV)
115	K.SC.Menen (IV)	2–3	K.BS.Poperinge (IV)
116	K.De Noordstar Heule	1–3	K.SC.Wielsbeke (V)
117	K.SC.Blankenberge	0–2	K.SV.De Ruiter Roeselare (V)
118	R.SC.Templeuvois (IV)	2–3	S.V.V.Damme (V)
119	K.FC.Langemark	2–0	R.US.Herseautoise Sp.
120	K.SK.Lebbeke (V)	3–3 (p.) 5–6	K.SK.Maldegem (IV)
121	R.ES.Acrenoise (IV)	3–2	R.RC.Wetteren-Kwatrecht (V)
122	SV.Voorde (V)	1–1 (p.) 5–4	K.E.Appelterre-Eichem (IV)
123	SK.Berlare (IV)	2–5 (p.) 5–6	K.VC.Jong Lede (IV)
124	R.RC.Gent-Zeehaven (IV)	1–2	Rapide Club Lebbeke (V)
125	U.St-Ghislane-Tertre-Hautrage (IV)	2–1	Thor Kokerij-Meldert (IV)
126	VC.Eendracht Houtem	0–3	R.FC Tournai (IV)
127	K.FC.Sparta Petegem (IV)	2–0	K.FC.Merelbeke (V)
128	VC.Herentals (V)	1–1 (p.) 4–5	K.Witgoor Sport Dessel (IV)
129	K.FC.Sint-Lenaarts (IV)	3–2	K.Ternesse VV.Wommelgem (IV)
130	K.FC.Duffel (IV)	2–1	FC.Turnhout
131	Merksem-Antwerp Noord SC. (IV)	3–0	K.Sint-Job FC. (V)
132	K.FC.Zwarte Leeuw (V)	1–1 (p.) 2–4	K.Lyra TSV. (IV)
133	K.FC.De Kempen T.L (V)	2–1	K.Retie SK.
134	K.SK.Wavria	2–3	K.Eendracht FC.Zoersel
135	Racing Butsel	6–0	SC.Beauvechain
136	Sporting Eizeringen	1–2	VK.Liedekerke
137	Crossing Schaerbeek Evere (V)	1–1 (p.) 5–3	K.SK.Halle (IV)
138	R.Léopold Uccle FC. (IV)	1–4	FC.Pepingen (V)
139	K.FC.Herent	0–8	Tempo Overijse (IV)

Tie no	Home team	Score	Away team
140	FC Ganshoren (IV)	2–0	VC.Bekkevoort
141	K.SK.L.Ternat (IV)	0–1	FC.Suryoyes Bruxellois
142	K.VK.Beringen (V)	1–1 (p.) 4–3	K.Esperanza Neerpelt (IV)
143	K.SK.Hasselt (IV)	2–0	K.Everbeur Sport Averbode (IV)
144	K.Vlijtingen VV. (V)	3–1	FC.Torpedo Hasselt (V)
145	K.ESK.Leopoldsburg (IV)	4–1	K.Lutlommel VV. (IV)
146	K.Overpeltse VV. (IV)	0–3	K.SK.Bree (IV)
147	K.Sportclub Tongeren (V)	1–4	Spouwen-Mopertingen (IV)
148	Excelsior Veldwezelt (IV)	1–0	K.VV.Weerstand Koersel (V)
149	Union Royale Namur (IV)	5–1	JS.Taminoise (IV)
150	R.ES.Couvin-Mariembourg (V)	4–0	CS.Entité Manageoise (V)
151	R.US.Genly-Quevy 89 (IV)	2–0	R.W.Walhain CG. (IV)
152	CS.Onhaye (V)	3–0	R.Léopold Club Mesvinois
153	R.U.S.Loyers (V)	2–2 (p.) 0–3	R.FC.Spy (V)
154	R.FC.Meux (IV)	6–4	R.OC.de Charleroi-March. (IV)
155	SC.Montignies	0–3	Sp.Espoir Jemeppe (V)
156	R.SP.Bosquetia Frameries	3–8	FC.Charleroi (IV)
157	R.RC.Hamoir (IV)	3–2	R.FC.Warnant (V)
158	R.FC.Hannutois	0–4	R.FC.de Liège (IV)
159	Cité Sport Grace-Hollogne (IV)	2–2 (p.) 7–6	R.CS.Verlaine
160	R.FC. 1912 Raeren (V)	0–1	R.FC.Tilleur St.-Gilles (V)
161	Stade Disonais (V)	1–1 (p.) 4–3	R.Aywaille FC. (IV)
162	R.Sprimont Comblain Sport (IV)	1–2	RFC.Turkania Faymonville (IV)
163	R.RC.Longlier (V)	3–1	R.SC.Habay-La-Neuve
164	R.OC.Rochois (V)	3–0	R.US.Givry (IV)
165	R.RC.Mormont (IV)	2–1	Un.R.St-Louis-Saint-Léger (V)
166	R.All.FC.Oppagne-Wéris (V)	1–2	FC.Jeun.Lorr.Arlonaise (IV)
167	R.Standard FC.Bièvre (IV)	3–2	US.Beauraing 61 (V)
168	R.OC.Meix-Dt-Virton (V)	1–0	R.US.Sartoise (V)

56 teams progressed to the third round, of which 32 came from the Promotion league (tier 4), 19 came from the top Provinciaal leagues (tier 5) and 5 came from the lower Provinciaal leagues (tiers 6 to 8).

=== Round 3 ===
The matches were played on 11 and 12 August 2012. All of the teams in the Belgian Third Division entered at this stage, joining the 56 winning teams from the previous round.

Tie no	Home team	Score	Away team
169	K. Rupel Boom F.C. (III)	4–1	FC Ganshoren (IV)
170	FC.Suryoyes Bruxellois	2–4	K.SV.De Ruiter Roeselare (V)
171	R.RC.Hamoir (IV)	1–4	Torhout 1992 KM (III)
172	Crossing Schaerbeek Evere (V)	2–0	FC.V.Dender E.H. (III)
173	K.FC.Izegem (III)	3–0	K.Lyra TSV. (IV)
174	K.V. Turnhout (III)	5–0	Union Royale Namur (IV)
175	Stade Disonais (V)	0–3	K.V.Woluwe Zaventem (III)
176	R.U. Saint-Gilloise (III)	2–1	R.Standard FC.Bièvre (IV)
177	K.SK.Bree (IV)	0–0 (p.) 0–2	K.SC.Grimbergen (III)
178	R.OC.Rochois (V)	1–5	Spouwen-Mopertingen (IV)
179	K.Witgoor Sport Dessel (IV)	1–2	K.SV.Bornem (III)
180	K.Eendracht FC.Zoersel	0–4	K.VK.Ieper (IV)
181	FC.Jeun.Lorr.Arlonaise (IV)	2–0	FC.Bleid-Gaume (III)
182	R.US.Genly-Quevy 89 (IV)	2–1	K.FC.Sparta Petegem (IV)
183	K.FC.Vigor Wuitens Hamme (III)	3–0	Cité Sport Grace-Hollogne (IV)
184	K.R.C. Mechelen (III)	6–1	K.VK.Beringen (V)
185	RFC.Turkania Faymonville (IV)	3–3 (p.) 7–6	S.V.V.Damme (V)
186	K.FC.Langemark	0–4	UR La Louvière Centre (III)
187	K.SK.Maldegem (IV)	0–1	K.Bocholter VV. (III)
188	R.U.Wallonne Ciney (III)	4–1	R.RC.Longlier (V)
189	R.OC.Meix-Dt-Virton (V)	1–4	K.MSK.Deinze (III)
190	K.ESK.Leopoldsburg (IV)	0–2	K.SK.Ronse (III)
191	Excelsior Veldwezelt (IV)	0–2	Tempo Overijse (IV)
192	R.FC.Meux (IV)	0–1	K.SK.Hasselt (IV)
193	R.ES.Acrenoise (IV)	1–2	K.FC.De Kempen T.L (V)
194	R.FC.Spy (V)	1–6	K. Olsa Brakel (III)
195	K.FC.Sint-Lenaarts (IV)	0–0 (p.) 4–3	K. Berchem Sport 2004 (III)

Tie no	Home team	Score	Away team
196	K. Diegem Sport (III)	1–1 (p.) 4–3	K.FC.Duffel (IV)
197	K.Vlijtingen VV. (V)	0–2	Hoogstraten VV. (III)
198	R.Geants Athois (III)	4–0	CS.Onhaye (V)
199	Racing Butsel	0–0 (p.) 2–4	Merksem-Antwerp Noord SC. (IV)
200	R.ES.Couvin-Mariembourg (V)	0–3	K.SV. Temse (III)
201	VK.Liedekerke	1–5	K.VV.Coxyde (III)
202	Verbroedering Geel-Meerhout (III)	0–2	R.FC.de Liège (IV)
203	K.VK.Tienen (III)	1–1 (p.) 5–4	K.Sint-Eloois-Winkel Sport (IV)
204	K.SC.Wielsbeke (V)	0–5	R.Excelsior Virton (III)
205	K. Standaard Wetteren (III)	1–1 (p.) 2–3	R.FC.Tilleur St.-Gilles (V)
206	R.FC Tournai (IV)	2–0	K. Racing Waregem (III)
207	R.FC.Un.La Calamine (III)	1–0	Rapide Club Lebbeke (V)
208	SV.Voorde (V)	1–1 (p.) 5–3	Heppig.-Lambusart-Fleurus (III)
209	K. Patro Eisden Maasmechelen (III)	3–2	K.BS.Poperinge (IV)
210	K.VC.Jong Lede (IV)	1–0	R.C.S. Verviétois (III)
211	U.St-Ghislane-Tertre-Hautrage (IV)	0–6	R. Entente Bertrigeoise (III)
212	FC.Pepingen (V)	1–0	R. Cappellen F.C. (III)
213	R.RC.Mormont (IV)	0–3	R.FC.Huy (III)
214	FC.Charleroi (IV)	5–0	Sp.Espoir Jemeppe (V)

At the end of this round, 46 teams progressed, of which 26 came from the Third Division, 14 came from the Promotion league (tier 4) and 6 came from the top Provinciaal leagues (tier 5) - all remaining teams from tiers 6 to 8 were eliminated in this round.

=== Round 4 ===
The matches were played on 18 and 19 August 2012. All of the teams in the Belgian Second Division entered at this stage, joining the 46 winning teams from the previous round.

Tie no	Home team	Score	Away team
215	Spouwen-Mopertingen (IV)	3–1	Lommel United (II)
216	K. Rupel Boom F.C. (III)	0–1	K. Olsa Brakel (III)
217	K.SK.Ronse (III)	2–4	K.V.Woluwe Zaventem (III)
218	Eendracht Aalst (II)	1–3	R.U. Saint-Gilloise (III)
219	K. Diegem Sport (III)	0–3	Tubize (II)
220	Torhout 1992 KM (III)	0–1	K.VV.Coxyde (III)
221	K. Patro Eisden Maasmechelen (III)	0–2	UR La Louvière Centre (III)
222	R.FC Tournai (IV)	3–0	K.V. Turnhout (III)
223	K.R.C. Mechelen (III)	0–1	K.SC.Grimbergen (III)
224	K.SV.De Ruiter Roeselare (V)	1–3	SV.Voorde (V)
225	R.FC.Un.La Calamine (III)	2–1	K.SK.Hasselt (IV)
226	Heist (II)	3–2	K.FC.De Kempen T.L (V)
227	R.FC.de Liège (IV)	2–0	Roeselare (II)
228	K.FC.Izegem (III)	0–2	Boussu Dour (II)
229	R.Geants Athois (III)	0–1	WS Woluwe (II)
230	Westerlo (II)	3–0	R.FC.Huy (III)

Tie no	Home team	Score	Away team
231	Merksem-Antwerp Noord SC. (IV)	2–4	R. Entente Bertrigeoise (III)
232	K.SV.Bornem (III)	1–2	R.U.Wallonne Ciney (III)
233	K.VC.Jong Lede (IV)	0–3	FC Brussels (II)
234	K.FC.Sint-Lenaarts (IV)	2–3	K.MSK.Deinze (III)
235	Hoogstraten VV. (III)	4–0	R.FC.Tilleur St.-Gilles (V)
236	FC.Charleroi (IV)	1–4	Visé (II)
237	FC.Pepingen (V)	3–2	Sportkring Sint-Niklaas (II)
238	K.Bocholter VV. (III)	1–0	K.SV. Temse (III)
239	R.Excelsior Virton (III)	3–0	Crossing Schaerbeek Evere (V)
240	FC.Jeun.Lorr.Arlonaise (IV)	1–4	Eupen (II)
241	K.FC.Vigor Wuitens Hamme (III)	0–4	Sint-Truiden (II)
242	Dessel Sport (II)	5–0	RFC.Turkania Faymonville (IV)
243	K.VK.Ieper (IV)	0–5	Mouscron-Peruwelz (II)
244	Antwerp (II)	1–1 (p 5–4	K.VK.Tienen (III)
245	Oostende (II)	2–1	Tempo Overijse (IV)
246	Oudenaarde (II)	6–1	R.US.Genly-Quevy 89 (IV)

At the end of this round, 32 teams progressed to round 5, of which 14 came from the Second Division, 13 came from the Third Division, 3 came from the Promotion league and 2 came from the top Provinciaal leagues.

=== Round 5 ===
The matches took place on 25 and 26 August 2012, between the 32 winning teams from round 4.

Tie no	Home team	Score	Away team
247	R.U.Wallonne Ciney (III)	2–0	R.FC.Un.La Calamine (III)
248	Oostende (II)	2–0	UR La Louvière Centre (III)
249	Oudenaarde (II)	1–2	WS Woluwe (II)
250	Westerlo (II)	2–0	Heist (II)
251	K.V.Woluwe Zaventem (III)	6–1	SV.Voorde (V)
252	Boussu Dour (II)	1–0	Antwerp (II)
253	K.Bocholter VV. (III)	2–1	R.Excelsior Virton (III)
254	K.VV.Coxyde (III)	2–1	Eupen (II)

Tie no	Home team	Score	Away team
255	K.SC.Grimbergen (III)	1–2	Dessel Sport (II)
256	FC Brussels (II)	2–0	R.FC.de Liège (IV)
257	K.MSK.Deinze (III)	2–0	K. Olsa Brakel (III)
258	R.U. Saint-Gilloise (III)	3–1	Tubize (II)
259	Hoogstraten VV. (III)	3–1	R.FC Tournai (IV)
260	R. Entente Bertrigeoise (III)	2–1	FC.Pepingen (V)
261	Sint-Truiden (II)	1–1 (p 4–2	Visé (II)
262	Mouscron-Peruwelz (II)	3–0	Spouwen-Mopertingen (IV)

Of the 16 teams who progressed to round 6, 8 came from the Second Division and 8 came from the Third Division.

== Final Stages ==
=== Bracket ===
Round of 32
Gent	8
Bocholt	0
Lokeren	3
Dessel Sport	0
Anderlecht	2
Boussu Dour	0
Mechelen	6
Bertrix	0
Zulte Waregem	1
Coxyde	0
Deinze	2
Charleroi	4 (aet)
Union	0
Genk	6
Mouscron-Péruwelz	2
Standard Liège	3 (aet)
Westerlo	2
Lierse	0
Sint-Truiden	1 (4 pen.)
Beerschot	1 (2)
WS Woluwe	1
Kortrijk	2 (aet)
Mons	3
Ciney	0
Club Brugge	3
Woluwe Zaventem	0
Hoogstraten	1
Cercle Brugge	3
Brussels	1
Waasland-Beveren	3 (aet)
Oostende	2
OH Leuven	1

Round of 16
Gent	0 (4 pen.)
Lokeren	0 (2)
Anderlecht	2 (aet)
Mechelen	0
Zulte Waregem	2 (4 pen.)
Charleroi	2 (2)
Genk	1
Standard Liège	0
Westerlo	5 (2)
Sint-Truiden	5 (4 pen.)
Kortrijk	1
Mons	0
Club Brugge	0
Cercle Brugge	1
Waasland-Beveren	0
Oostende	3

Quarterfinals
Gent	1	0	1
Anderlecht	1	1	2
Zulte Waregem	0	1	1
Genk	5	0	5
Sint-Truiden	0	0	0
Kortrijk	0	1	1
Cercle Brugge	2	2	4
Oostende	1	1	2

Semifinals
Anderlecht	1	1	1 (6)
Genk	0	1	1 (7 pen.)
Kortrijk	1	2	3
Cercle Brugge	2	2	4 (aet)

Final
Genk	2
Cercle Brugge	0

=== Round 6 ===
The draw for round 6 was made on 6 September 2012, and the matches took place on 25 and 26 September 2012. The 16 teams from the Belgian Pro League entered at this stage, and each will play one of the 16 winners from the previous round.

25 September 2012	Mouscron-Peruwelz (II)	2–3 (a.e.t.)	Standard Liège (I)	Mouscron
20:15 CEST	Mezine 7'; Ruiz 99' (pen.)		Ajdarević 90+4' (pen.); Domrane 93' (o.g.); Van Damme 114'	Stadium: Stade Le Canonnier; Attendance: 5,500; Referee: Wim Smet

26 September 2012	Mons (I)	3–0	R.U.Wallonne Ciney (III)	Mons
20:00 CEST	Perbet 31', 90', 90+1'			Stadium: Stade Charles Tondreau; Attendance: 1,174; Referee: Jürgen Brinckman

26 September 2012	Lokeren (I)	3–0	Dessel Sport (II)	Lokeren
20:00 CEST	Mokulu 14'; Harbaoui 17', 21'			Stadium: Daknamstadion; Attendance: 1,100; Referee: Carlos Manuel Alho-Guereirro

26 September 2012	Gent (I)	8–0	K.Bocholter VV. (III)	Ghent
20:00 CEST	Conté 9' (pen.), 22'; Raman 33'; Melli 43', 68'; Nahayo 62'; N'Diaye 75', 83'			Stadium: Jules Ottenstadion; Attendance: 3,096; Referee: Peter Vervecken

26 September 2012	WS Woluwe (II)	1–2 (a.e.t.)	Kortrijk (I)	Woluwe-Saint-Lambert
20:00 CEST	Oliveira 22' (pen.)		Nfor 3'; Pavlović 98'	Stadium: Stade Fallon, Attendance: 650; Referee: Sam Loeman

26 September 2012	Anderlecht (I)	2–0	Boussu Dour (II)	Brussels
20:00 CEST	Bruno 63'; Praet 87'			Stadium: Constant Vanden Stock Stadium; Attendance: 7,930; Referee: Nicolas Laforge

26 September 2012	Club Brugge (I)	3–0	K.V. Woluwe-Zaventem (III)	Bruges
20:00 CEST	Figueras 33'; Odjidja-Ofoe 37'; Vleminckx 85'			Stadium: Jan Breydelstadion; Attendance: 2,800; Referee: Bart Vertenten

26 September 2012	Zulte Waregem (I)	1–0	K.V.V. Coxyde (III)	Waregem
20:00 CEST	Habibou 52'			Stadium: Regenboogstadion; Attendance: 1,320; Referee: Christof Virant

26 September 2012	Union SG (III)	0–6	Genk (I)	Forest
20:00 CEST			Croux 14'; Plet 19'; Limbombe 27'; Vossen 33'; Nadson 50'; Kumordzi 88'	Stadium: Stade Joseph Marien; Attendance: 2,500; Referee: Laurent Colemonts

26 September 2012	Westerlo (II)	2–0	Lierse (I)	Westerlo
20:00 CEST	Van Belle 6'; Goor 9' (pen.)			Stadium: Het Kuipje; Attendance: 2,750; Referee: Serge Gumienny

26 September 2012	Deinze (III)	2–4 (a.e.t.)	Charleroi (I)	Deinze
20:00 CEST	Vandenhende 34'; De Groote 56'		Rossini 48'; Badibanga 78'; Escoe 101'; Gnohéré 120+1'	Stadium: Burgemeester Van de Wiele Stadion; Attendance: 1,200; Referee: Frederik Geldhof

26 September 2012	Oostende (II)	2–1	OH Leuven (I)	Ostend
20:00 CEST	Dissa 67'; Vandamme 80'		Dehond 82'	Stadium: Albertparkstadion; Attendance: 795; Referee: Christof Dierick

26 September 2012	Mechelen (I)	6–0	R. Entente Bertrigeoise (III)	Mechelen
20:00 CEST	Destorme 11'; Van Damme 61'; Cordaro 65'; Enevoldsen 68', 88'; Pedersen 73'			Stadium: Argosstadion Achter de Kazerne; Attendance: 2,713; Referee: Denis Vanbecelaere

26 September 2012	FC Brussels (II)	1–3 (a.e.t.)	Waasland-Beveren (I)	Molenbeek-Saint-Jean
20:00 CEST	Siani 78' (pen.)		Ndabashinze 71'; Plut 112'; Cavens 119' (pen.)	Stadium: Stade Edmond Machtens; Attendance: 900; Referee: Johan Verbist

26 September 2012	Hoogstraten VV. (III)	1–3	Cercle Brugge (I)	Hoogstraten
20:30 CEST	Tilburgs 14'		Uchebo 12'; Van Gassen 26' (o.g.); Rudy 83'	Stadium: Sportcomplex Seminarie; Attendance: 1,700; Referee: Erik Lambrechts

26 September 2012	Sint-Truiden (II)	1–1 (a.e.t.) (4–2 p)	Beerschot (I)	Sint-Truiden
20:45 CEST	Ghoochannejhad 16'		Veselinović 52'	Stadium: Stayen; Attendance: 1,050; Referee: Sebastien Delferière
	Penalties
	Rossen (penalty scored); Bonemme (penalty scored); Ghoochannejhad (penalty scored); Andrade (penalty missed); Verhulst (penalty scored)		(penalty scored) Losada; (penalty missed) Veselinović; (penalty missed) Ojo; (penalty scored) Öztürk

=== Round 7 ===
The draw for round 7 was made on 1 October 2012, and the matches will take place on 27, 28 and 29 November 2012.

27 November 2012	Anderlecht (I)	2–0 (a.e.t.)	Mechelen (I)	Brussels
20:00 CET	Praet 109'; Mbokani 118'			Stadium: Constant Vanden Stock Stadium; Referee: Jérôme Efong Nzolo

28 November 2012	Westerlo (II)	5–5 (a.e.t.) (2–4 p)	Sint-Truiden (II)	Westerlo
20:00 CET	Goor 61'; Owusu 87', 107'; Laureys 110'; Wilmet 116'		Ghoochannejhad 23', 109'; Edmilson 60'; Schouterden 91', 98'	Stadium: Het Kuipje
	Penalties
	Van Belle (penalty missed); Wilmet (penalty scored); Trenson (penalty scored); Maertens (penalty missed)		(penalty scored) Rossen; (penalty scored) Bonemme; (penalty scored) Dufer; (penalty scored) Ghoochannejhad

28 November 2012	Gent (I)	0–0 (a.e.t.) (4–2 p)	Lokeren (I)	Ghent
20:00 CET				Stadium: Jules Ottenstadion
	Penalties
	Maréval (penalty scored); Rafinha (penalty scored); Mboyo (penalty scored); Messoudi (penalty scored)		(penalty missed) Taravel; (penalty scored) Persoons; (penalty missed) De Bock; (penalty scored) Mil. Marić

28 November 2012	Zulte Waregem (I)	2–2 (a.e.t.) (4–2 p)	Charleroi (I)	Waregem
20:00 CET	Lendrić 34'; Colpaert 80'		Bopp 25'; Kudemor 72'	Stadium: Regenboogstadion; Referee: Wim Smet
	Penalties
	Leye (penalty scored); Lendrić (penalty scored); Berrier (penalty scored); Naessens (penalty scored)		(penalty missed) Džinić; (penalty scored) Kudemor; (penalty scored) Satli; (penalty missed) N'Ganga

28 November 2012	Kortrijk (I)	1–0	Mons (I)	Kortrijk
20:00 CET	Chavarría 64'			Stadium: Guldensporenstadion

28 November 2012	Waasland-Beveren (I)	0–3	Oostende (II)	Beveren
20:30 CET			Moreels 8'; Vandamme 21'; Depoitre 64'	Stadium: Freethiel Stadion

28 November 2012	Club Brugge (I)	0–1	Cercle Brugge (I)	Bruges
20:45 CET			Guðjohnsen 7'	Stadium: Jan Breydelstadion

29 November 2012	Genk (I)	1–0	Standard Liège (I)	Genk
20:45 CET	Vossen 49'			Stadium: Cristal Arena

=== Quarter-finals ===
The draw for the quarterfinals took place together with the draw for round 7 on 1 October 2012. The matches will be played over two legs on 12 December 2012 (leg 1) and 16 January 2013 (leg 2).

==== First legs ====
11 December 2012	Gent (I)	1–1	Anderlecht (I)	Ghent
20:00 CET	Mboyo 15'		Jovanović 10'	Stadium: Jules Ottenstadion

12 December 2012	Cercle Brugge (I)	2–1	Oostende (II)	Bruges
20:00 CET	Bakenga 24'; Mertens 80' (pen.)		De Schutter 90'	Stadium: Jan Breydelstadion

12 December 2012	Sint-Truiden (II)	0–0	Kortrijk (I)	Sint-Truiden
20:30 CET				Stadium: Stayen,

13 December 2012	Zulte Waregem (I)	0–5	Genk (I)	Waregem
20:45 CET			Barda 9'; Gorius 16'; De Ceulaer 36', 59'; Buffel 52'	Stadium: Regenboogstadion

==== Second legs ====
16 January 2013	Anderlecht (I)	1–0 (2–1 agg.)	Gent (I)	Brussels
20:00	De Sutter 17'			Stadium: Constant Vanden Stock Stadium; Referee: Serge Gumienny

16 January 2013	Genk (I)	0–1 (5–1 agg.)	Zulte Waregem (I)	Genk
			Leye 68' (pen.)	Stadium: Cristal Arena; Referee: Christof Dierick

16 January 2013	Kortrijk (I)	1–0 (1–0 agg.)	Sint-Truiden (II)	Kortrijk
20:00	Dejaegere 80'			Stadium: Guldensporenstadion; Referee: Joeri Van De Velde

16 January 2013	Oostende (II)	1–2 (2–4 agg.)	Cercle Brugge (I)	Ostend
20:00	Schmisser 72'		Van Eenoo 50'; Mertens 90+3' (pen.)	Stadium: Albertparkstadion; Referee: Jérôme Efong Nzolo

=== Semi-finals ===
The matches will be played over two legs on 29 January 2013 (leg 1) and 2 March 2013 (leg 2).

==== First legs ====
30 January 2013	Anderlecht (I)	1–0	Genk (I)	Brussels
20:00	Jovanović 29'			Stadium: Constant Vanden Stock Stadium; Attendance: 15,000; Referee: Sébastien Delferiere

3 March 2013	Kortrijk (I)	1–2	Cercle Brugge (I)	Kortrijk
14:30	Chavarría 4'		D'haene 26'; Bakenga 62'	Stadium: Guldensporenstadion; Attendance: 6,360; Referee: Luc Woyters

==== Second legs ====
2 March 2013	Genk (I)	1–0 (a.e.t.) (1–1 agg.) (7–6 p)	Anderlecht (I)	Genk
18:00	Vossen 62'			Stadium: Cristal Arena; Attendance: 13,912; Referee: Alexandre Boucaut
	Penalties
	Gorius (penalty scored); Hyland (penalty scored); Plet (penalty missed); Vossen (penalty scored); Simaeys (penalty scored); Koulibaly (penalty missed); Ngcongca (penalty missed); Tshimanga (penalty scored); Croux (penalty scored); Köteles (penalty scored)		(penalty missed) Biglia; (penalty scored) Nuytinck; (penalty scored) Gillet; (penalty scored) Wasilewski; (penalty scored) De Sutter; (penalty missed) Odoi; (penalty missed) Jovanović; (penalty scored) Kouyaté; (penalty scored) Deschacht; (penalty missed) Proto

27 March 2013	Cercle Brugge (I)	2–2 (a.e.t.) (4–3 agg.)	Kortrijk (I)	Bruges
20:45 CET	Uchebo 73', 120'		Pavlović 29'; Nfor 52'	Stadium: Jan Breydelstadion; Attendance: 2,100; Referee: Serge Gumienny

== Final ==
9 May 2013
20:45 CEST

Cercle Brugge	0–2	Genk
	Report; Line-ups	Kumordzi 85'; Vossen 89'

King Baudouin Stadium, Brussels
Attendance: 43,000
Referee: Johan Verbist

== See also ==
- 2012–13 Belgian Pro League
