= Mijat Marić =

Swiss footballer (born 1984)

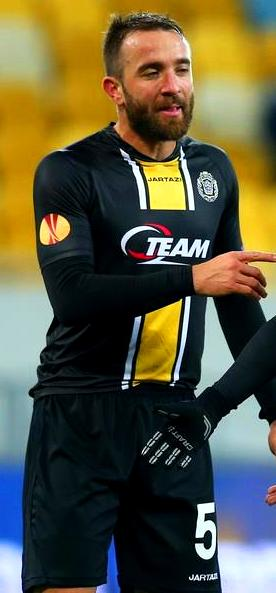

Personal information
- Date of birth: 30 April 1984 (age 42)
- Place of birth: Minusio, Switzerland
- Height: 1.88 m (6 ft 2 in)
- Position: Defender

Youth career
- Malcantone Agno

Senior career*
Years	Team	Apps	(Gls)
2002	Lugano	18	(2)
2003–2008	St. Gallen	92	(3)
2007	→ Luzern (loan)	9	(0)
2008–2009	Bari	0	(0)
2009	→ Eupen (loan)	13	(2)
2009–2010	Eupen	30	(5)
2010–2018	Lokeren	199	(30)
2018–2022	Lugano	100	(12)

International career
–2006	Switzerland U21	8	(1)
- * Club domestic league appearances and goals

Mijat Marić (born 30 April 1984) is a Swiss former footballer of Croatian descent, who played as a defender.

== Career ==
Marić started his career at AC Lugano of Ticino, an Italian speaking region. After the bankrupt of the club, he joined FC Malcantone Agno. In summer 2003 he joined FC St. Gallen of Swiss Super League. He played 2 matches for the club before left on loan to FC Luzern until December 2007.

In March 2007, he signed a 3-year contract with Bari on free transfer, effective on 1 July 2008.

After not getting to play any matches for Bari at Serie B, he left for K.A.S. Eupen of Belgian Second Division.

He played one year in K.A.S. Eupen and was voted for the best player in second tier of Belgium football.

In August 2018, Maric returned to Lugano after 10 years playing abroad.

== Honours ==
Lokeren

- Belgian Cup: 2011–12, 2013–14

Lugano

- Swiss Cup: 2021–22
