= Wim De Corte =

Belgian footballer and manager

Personal information
- Date of birth: 13 November 1971 (age 54)
- Place of birth: Wetteren, Belgium

Team information
- Current team: OH Leuven

Managerial career
- Years: Team
- 2000–2011: Standaard Wetteren
- 2012–2013: Beerschot AC
- 2013–2014: Roeselare
- 2016–: OH Leuven (technical director)

Wim De Corte (born 13 November 1971) is a Belgian football manager. His previous clubs include Standaard Wetteren, Beerschot AC and Roeselare.
