= Samuel Dog =

French footballer (born 1985)

Personal information
- Date of birth: 13 February 1985 (age 41)
- Place of birth: Lille, France
- Height: 1.95 m (6 ft 5 in)
- Positions: Defensive midfielder; centre-back

Senior career*
| Years | Team | Apps | (Gls) |
| 2004–2006 | Wevelgem City | | |
| 2006–2008 | Union SG | | |
| 2008–2009 | Deinze | 7 | (0) |
| 2010–2011 | Charleroi-Marchienne | 28 | (3) |
| 2011–2014 | Mouscron-Peruwelz | 57 | (0) |
| 2014–2015 | IC Croix | | |
| 2015–2017 | Progrès Niederkorn | 31 | (1) |
| 2017–2021 | Rodange 91 | 36 | (2) |
| 2021–2023 | Schifflange 95 | | |
- * Club domestic league appearances and goals

Samuel Dog (born 13 February 1985) is a French former professional footballer who played as a defensive midfielder or centre-back.
