= Karel De Smet =

Belgian footballer

Personal information
- Date of birth: 21 August 1980 (age 46)
- Place of birth: Ghent, Belgium
- Height: 1.89 m (6 ft 2 in)
- Position: Centre back

Youth career
- KFC Eendracht Moortsele

Senior career*
Years	Team	Apps	(Gls)
1999–2000	Lokeren	10	(0)
2001	Verbroedering Geel	12	(1)
2001–2002	Harelbeke	30	(4)
2002–2009	Hamme	210	(21)
2009–2011	Tienen	60	(2)
2011–2012	Antwerp	42	(0)
2013	Daejeon Citizen	0	(0)
- * Club domestic league appearances and goals

Karel De Smet (born 21 August 1980) is a Belgian former professional footballer who played as centre back.
