= Benjamin De Ceulaer =

Belgian footballer

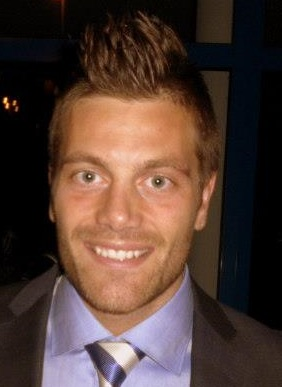
- De Ceulaer in 2013

Personal information
- Full name: Benjamin De Ceulaer
- Date of birth: 19 December 1983 (age 42)
- Place of birth: Genk, Belgium
- Height: 1.75 m (5 ft 9 in)
- Positions: Forward; winger

Youth career
- 1990–1992: Eendracht Termien
- 1992–1993: Sporting Hasselt
- 1993–1995: Anderlecht
- 1995–1999: Genk
- 1999–2000: Hasselt

Senior career*
| Years | Team | Apps | (Gls) |
| 2000–2002 | Hasselt | 29 | (3) |
| 2002–2005 | Sint-Truiden | 67 | (5) |
| 2005–2006 | Feyenoord | 2 | (0) |
| 2006–2010 | RKC Waalwijk | 113 | (19) |
| 2010–2012 | Lokeren | 73 | (26) |
| 2012–2015 | Genk | 68 | (11) |
| 2015–2018 | Westerlo | 36 | (7) |
| 2018 | Eendracht Termien | 0 | (0) |
| Total | | 388 | (71) |

International career
| 2002–2003 | Belgium U20 | 3 | (1) |
| 2004–2005 | Belgium U21 | 17 | (6) |
- * Club domestic league appearances and goals

Benjamin De Ceulaer (born 19 December 1983) is a Belgian former footballer. He had to retire in November 2018 because of injuries.

== Career ==
On 20 January 2007, De Ceulaer played his first Eredivisie match with RKC Waalwijk against FC Twente. In the play-offs for a ticket to the Eredivisie he scored the winning goal in the third match against De Graafschap.

On 13 July 2010, he signed for K.S.C. Lokeren Oost-Vlaanderen leaving RKC.

In February 2012, he received his first call-up to the senior national team of his country for a friendly match against Greece.

== Honours ==
Lokeren

- Belgian Cup (1): 2011–12

Genk

- Belgian Cup (1): 2012–13
