= Roei Dayan =

Israeli footballer

Roei Dayan רועי דיין
Personal information
- Full name: Roei Dayan
- Date of birth: September 19, 1984 (age 42)
- Place of birth: Tel Aviv, Israel
- Height: 1.82 m (6 ft 0 in)
- Position: Centre forward

Youth career
- 2000–2003: Maccabi Tel Aviv

Senior career*
Years	Team	Apps	(Gls)
2003–2007	Maccabi Tel Aviv	44	(2)
2004–2005	→ Hakoah Maccabi Ramat Gan (loan)	12	(2)
2007–2008	Hapoel Tel Aviv	12	(0)
2008–2009	Hapoel Kfar Saba	11	(5)
2009–2011	Hapoel Acre	55	(18)
2011–2013	Beerschot AC	31	(9)
2013–2015	Maccabi Petah Tikva	36	(10)
2015–2016	F.C. Ashdod	15	(3)
2016–2017	Maccabi Netanya	22	(4)
2017	Hakoah Amidar Ramat Gan	5	(1)
2017–2020	F.C. Holon Yermiyahu	54	(12)
2020	Shimshon Tel Aviv	0	(0)

International career
2000–2001	Israel U16	6	(1)
2002–2003	Israel U19	10	(4)
2006–2007	Israel U21	5	(1)
- * Club domestic league appearances and goals

Roei Dayan (Hebrew: רועי דיין, pronounced Rō'ī Dayan; born September 19, 1984) is a retired Israeli professional footballer who is mostly known for his time playing in Maccabi Tel Aviv and Hapoel Acre.

== Playing career ==
=== Club career ===
A product of the Maccabi Tel Aviv youth system, Dayan played his first match in the full team when he came on as a substitute in a Toto Cup match.

After being supposedly released by Maccabi, Dayan joined Scottish side, St Mirren for a week long trial. He impressed manager, Gus MacPherson, enough to have his trial extended by another week before being offered a contract.

However the proposed deal to bring him to St Mirren has fallen through because of the €400,000 price tag that Maccabi Tel Aviv placed on Dayan.

On 29 June 2011, Dayan signed a two-year contract with Belgian Pro League side Beerschot AC.

=== National team ===
Dayan was a part of the player pool for the Israel national under-21 football team that qualified for the 2007 UEFA European Under-21 Football Championship in the Netherlands.
