= Jérémy Sapina =

French footballer (born 1985)

Personal information
- Date of birth: 1 February 1985 (age 41)
- Place of birth: Rillieux-la-Pape, France
- Height: 1.87 m (6 ft 2 in)
- Position: Centre back

Senior career*
Years	Team	Apps	(Gls)
2003–2007	AS Nancy	2	(0)
2007–2010	R.E. Mouscron	58	(1)
2010–2011	Maritimo	0	(0)
2011–2015	RAEC	97	(9)
2015	Rapid București	11	(0)
2015–2016	SR Colmar	19	(1)
2016–2017	GF38	2	(0)
2017–2018	Louhans-Cuiseaux	22	(0)
Total		211	(11)
- * Club domestic league appearances and goals as of 23 March 2021

Jérémy Sapina (born 1 February 1985) is a French footballer who played as a central defender.
