= Benjamin Mokulu =

Association football player (born 1989)

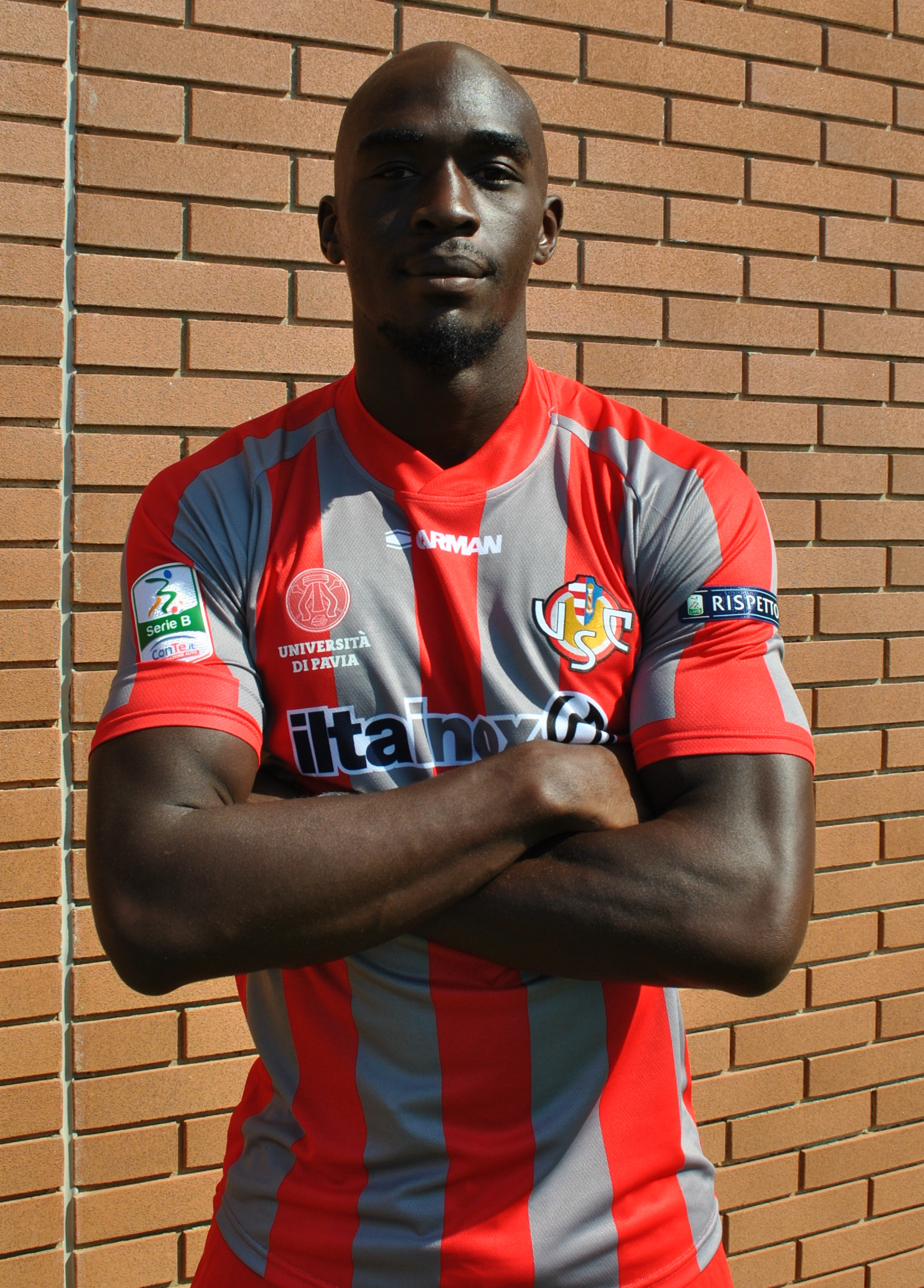
- Mokulu with Cremonese in 2017

Personal information
- Full name: Benjamin Mokulu Tembe
- Date of birth: 11 October 1989 (age 37)
- Place of birth: Brussels, Belgium
- Height: 1.87 m (6 ft 2 in)
- Position: Forward

Team information
- Current team: Heraclea
- Number: 89

Youth career
- –2007: FC Brussels

Senior career*
Years	Team	Apps	(Gls)
2007–2008	FC Brussels	12	(1)
2008	→ Union SG (loan)	11	(5)
2008–2009	Oostende	44	(19)
2010–2013	Lokeren	103	(18)
2013–2015	Mechelen	30	(4)
2014	→ Bastia (loan)	4	(0)
2015–2018	Avellino	60	(12)
2017	→ Frosinone (loan)	19	(2)
2017–2018	→ Cremonese (loan)	16	(4)
2018–2019	Carpi	16	(3)
2019	→ Juventus U23 (loan)	13	(4)
2019–2021	Padova	17	(1)
2020–2021	→ Ravenna (loan)	26	(13)
2022	Swift Hesperange	12	(6)
2022	Trapani	10	(0)
2022–2023	United Riccione	23	(3)
2023–2024	Matera	20	(5)
2024	Brindisi	12	(0)
2024–2025	Acireale	19	(11)
2025	UniPomezia	11	(0)
2025–	Heraclea	7	(0)

International career^{‡}
2010	Belgium U21	2	(1)
2011	DR Congo	1	(0)
- * Club domestic league appearances and goals as of 15 March 2026 ‡ National team caps and goals as of 3 September 2010

Benjamin Mokulu Tembe (born 11 October 1989) is a professional footballer who plays as a forward for Italian Serie D club Heraclea. Born in Belgium, he has represented the DR Congo national team.

== Club career ==
In January 2019, he joined Juventus U23 on loan.

After the end of the 2018–19 season, he was bought by Juventus. On 16 July 2019, he moved to Padova on a two-year contract. On 24 January 2020, he joined Ravenna on loan. On 3 September 2020, he returned to Ravenna on a season-long loan.

On 24 April 2021, Mokulu was suspended by a year for doping.

In January 2022, he joined Luxembourg club Swift Hesperange. In September 2022, he returned in Italy to play with Serie D club Trapani. On 1 December 2022, Mokulu joined United Riccione.

== International career ==
Mokulu played two matches, in 2010, in Belgium U21.

He also has a cap in DR Congo national team having made his debut against Gabon in 2011.

== Honours ==
Lokeren

- Belgian Cup: 2011–12
