= Abraham Kumedor =

Ghanaian footballer

Personal information
- Full name: Abraham Kumedor
- Date of birth: 25 February 1985 (age 41)
- Place of birth: Kpandu, Ghana
- Height: 1.81 m (5 ft 11 1/2 in)
- Position: Midfielder

Youth career
- Heart of Lions

Senior career*
| Years | Team | Apps | (Gls) |
| 2002–2004 | Heart of Lions | 24 | (?) |
| 2004–2008 | Saint-George SA | | |
| 2008–2010 | Budućnost Podgorica | 55 | (9) |
| 2011–2014 | Charleroi | 66 | (6) |
| 2014 | Al Fateh SC | | |
- * Club domestic league appearances and goals as of 23 April 2011

Abraham Kumedor (born 25 February 1985 in Kpandu) is a Ghanaian footballer. He currently plays in the Belgian Pro League for Charleroi.

== Career ==
Kumedor began his career with Heart of Lions, helping the club qualify for the CAF Confederation Cup for the first time in its history. In July 2004, he joined Saint-George SA, which won the Ethiopian Premier League in consecutive years. In July 2008, the defensive midfielder joined FK Budućnost Podgorica, a club competing in the Montenegrin First League. He remained there until the end of 2010 before joining Charleroi.

== Honours ==
Saint George

- Ethiopian Premier League (3): 2005, 2006 and 2008
- Ethiopian Super Cup (2): 2005 and 2006
