= Ibrahima Conté (footballer, born 1991) =

Guinean footballer

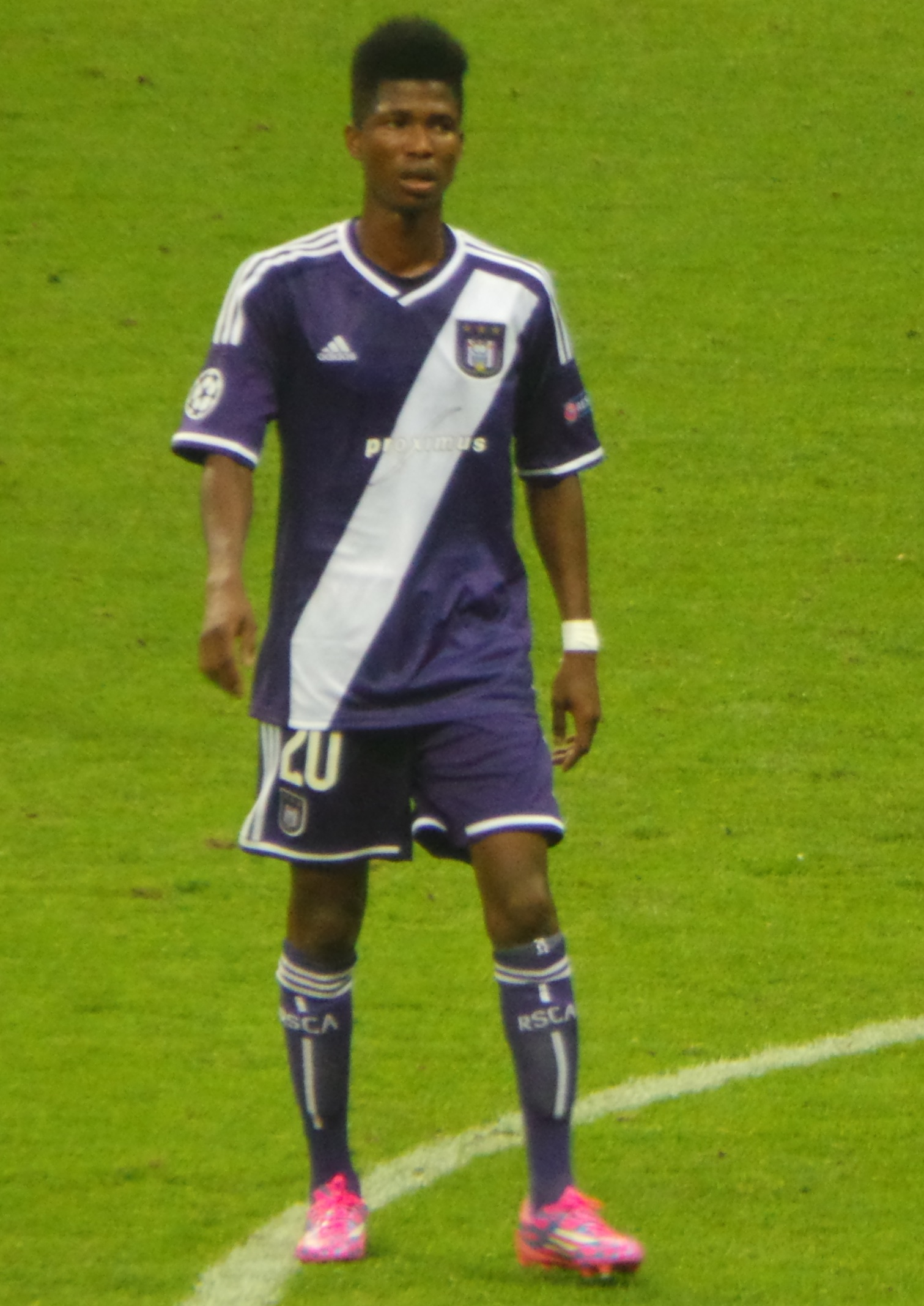
- Conté with Anderlecht

Personal information
- Full name: Ibrahima Sory Conté
- Date of birth: 3 April 1991 (age 35)
- Place of birth: Conakry, Guinea
- Height: 1.77 m (5 ft 10 in)
- Positions: Winger; attacking midfielder

Team information
- Current team: Maccabi Jaffa

Youth career
- 1996–2008: Gent

Senior career*
Years	Team	Apps	(Gls)
2009–2013	Gent	68	(4)
2013–2014	Zulte Waregem	56	(4)
2014–2016	Anderlecht	28	(2)
2016–2019	KV Oostende	17	(2)
2017	→ Waasland-Beveren (loan)	4	(0)
2019–2021	Beroe	42	(10)
2021–2023	Bnei Sakhnin	43	(3)
2023–	Maccabi Jaffa	0	(0)

International career^{‡}
2010–	Guinea	55	(4)
- * Club domestic league appearances and goals as of 17 January 2022 ‡ National team caps and goals as of 29 November 2021

Ibrahima Sory Conté (born 3 April 1991) is a Guinean professional footballer who plays as a midfielder for Liga Leumit club Maccabi Jaffa.

== Career ==
Conté comes from the youth section of Fello Star. He played his first games in Belgium in the youth division of K.A.A. Gent. His first game was in the 2009–10 season. He played for the team of Gent against KVC Westerlo as a substitute. In the 2010–11 season, he was definitely part of the A-team.

Conté joined KV Oostende in the end of August 2016. In January 2017, he was loaned out to Waasland-Beveren. Conté left KV Oostende on 5 March 2019.

Conté made his debut for Guinea on 17 November 2010, coming on as a substitute in the 1:2 loss against Burkina Faso in a friendly match.

== Career statistics ==
=== Club ===
As of 17 January 2016

Appearances and goals by club, season and competition
Club	Season	League			Cup		Europe		Total	
Club	Season	Division	Apps	Goals	Apps	Goals	Apps	Goals	Apps	Goals
Gent	2009–10	Belgian Pro League	1	0	0	0	1	0	2	0
Gent	2010–11	Belgian Pro League	30	2	3	1	4	1	37	4
Gent	2011–12	Belgian Pro League	21	1	1	1	0	0	22	2
Gent	2012–13	Belgian Pro League	14	1	1	2	4	1	19	4
Gent	Total		66	4	5	4	9	2	80	10
Zulte Waregem	2012–13	Belgian Pro League	16	1	0	0	5	0	21	1
Zulte Waregem	2013–14	Belgian Pro League	37	3	6	0	10	0	53	3
Zulte Waregem	2014–15	Belgian Pro League	5	0	0	0	4	1	9	1
Zulte Waregem	Total		58	4	6	0	19	1	83	5
Anderlecht	2014–15	Belgian Pro League	23	2	5	1	7	0	35	3
Anderlecht	2015–16	Belgian Pro League	3	0	2	0	1	0	6	0
Anderlecht	Total		28	2	7	1	8	0	43	3
Career total			152	10	18	5	36	3	206	18

=== International goals ===
As of ?
Scores and results list Guinea's goal tally first, score column indicates score after each Conté goal.

List of international goals scored by Ibrahima Sory Conté
No.	Date	Venue	Opponent	Score	Result	Competition
1	15 November 2011	Stade Henri Longuet, Paris, France	Burkina Faso	1–1	1–1	Friendly
2	13 January 2015	Stade Larbi Benbarek, Casablanca, Morocco	Senegal	2–5	2–5	Friendly
3	15 October 2019	Estadio José Rico Pérez, Alicante, Spain	Chile	1–0	2–3	Friendly
