= Hamdi Harbaoui =

Tunisian footballer

Personal information
- Date of birth: 5 January 1985 (age 41)
- Place of birth: Bizerte, Tunisia
- Height: 1.86 m (6 ft 1 in)
- Position: Forward

Senior career*
Years	Team	Apps	(Gls)
2003–2008	Espérance Tunis	107	(38)
2008	→ Mouscron (loan)	6	(0)
2008–2010	Visé	50	(35)
2010–2011	OH Leuven	34	(25)
2011–2014	Lokeren	107	(46)
2014–2015	Qatar SC	28	(21)
2015–2016	Lokeren	16	(12)
2016	Udinese	0	(0)
2016–2017	Anderlecht	19	(4)
2017	→ Charleroi (loan)	14	(4)
2017–2019	Zulte Waregem	52	(44)
2019–2020	Al-Arabi	23	(11)
2021	Excel Mouscron	10	(2)

International career^{‡}
2005–2006	Tunisia U-21	12	(3)
2008	Tunisia U-23	2	(2)
2012–2017	Tunisia	16	(4)
- * Club domestic league appearances and goals as of 09:11, 20 April 2021 (UTC) ‡ National team caps and goals as of 10 June 2018 (UTC)

Hamdi Harbaoui (Arabic: حمدي الحرباوي; born 5 January 1985) is a Tunisian professional footballer who plays as a forward.

== Club career ==
Harbaoui started his career in his home country with Espérance Tunis.

In the winter transfer window in season 2007–08, Harbaoui joined Belgian side Mouscron, who loaned him to Visé. After two successful seasons with Visé he was signed by OH Leuven, who were at that time playing in the Belgian Second Division. At OH Leuven, he immediately became a key player, scoring 25 goals during the 2010–11 season and thereby became the second division top scorer. Having helped OH Leuven to promotion to the Belgian Pro League, he signed with Lokeren.

With Lokeren, he won the 2011–12 Belgian Cup, scoring the only goal in the cup final. In the 2013–14 season, still with Lokeren, he won the Belgian Cup again and also became the season's top scorer in the league with 22 goals in 33 games.

In July 2014, Harbaoui moved to Qatar SC on a two-year contract, for a reported transfer fee of €2.5 million

On 9 May 2016, Harbaoui signed a three-year contract with Italian side Udinese Calcio.

On 30 August 2016, just three months after joining Udinese and without having made an appearance in a competitive match, Harbaoui returned to Belgium, moving to Anderlecht on a one-year deal. In January 2017, he was sent out on loan to Charleroi for the second half of the season.

== Career statistics ==
Scores and results list Tunisia's goal tally first, score column indicates score after each Harbaoui goal.

List of international goals scored by Hamdi Harbaoui
No.	Date	Venue	Opponent	Score	Result	Competition
1	27 May 2012	Stade Mustapha Ben Jannet, Monastir, Tunisia	Rwanda	2–0	5–1	Friendly
2	27 May 2012	Stade Mustapha Ben Jannet, Monastir, Tunisia	Rwanda	3–0	5–1	Friendly
3	2 June 2012	Stade Mustapha Ben Jannet, Monastir, Tunisia	Equatorial Guinea	2–1	3–1	2014 FIFA World Cup qualification
4	3 June 2016	Stade du Ville, Djibouti, Djibouti	Djibouti	2–0	3–0	2017 Africa Cup of Nations qualification

== Honours ==
ES Tunis

- Tunisian Ligue Professionnelle 1: 2003–04, 2005–06
- Tunisian Cup: 2005–06, 2006–07, 2007–08

Lokeren

- Belgian Cup: 2011–12, 2013–14

Individual

- Belgian Second Division top scorer: 2010–11
- Belgian Lion Award: 2013, 2014
- Belgian First Division A top scorer: 2013–14, 2017–18, 2018–19
