= Baptiste Martin =

French football defender (born 1985)

Personal information
- Full name: Baptiste Martin
- Date of birth: May 14, 1985 (age 41)
- Place of birth: Troyes, France
- Height: 1.85 m (6 ft 1 in)
- Position: Defender

Team information
- Current team: Clermont
- Number: 3

Youth career
- 2003–2005: Auxerre

Senior career*
Years	Team	Apps	(Gls)
2005–2010	Auxerre	29	(0)
2008–2009	→ Clermont (loan)	25	(0)
2010–2014	Kortrijk	113	(1)
2014–2017	Clermont	47	(3)
- * Club domestic league appearances and goals as of 00:02, 10 February 2018 (UTC)

Baptiste Martin (born 14 May 1985) is a French football defender who last played for Clermont Foot.

== Career ==
Martin was born in Troyes. In the 2008–09 season he played on loan for Clermont Foot from Auxerre. In May 2010 he left Auxerre to sign a two-year deal with K.V. Kortrijk. He played over 100 league matches for the Belgian Pro League club in the years 2010–14. On 12 June 2014, he rejoined his former club Clermont on a three-year deal.
