= David Destorme =

Belgian footballer

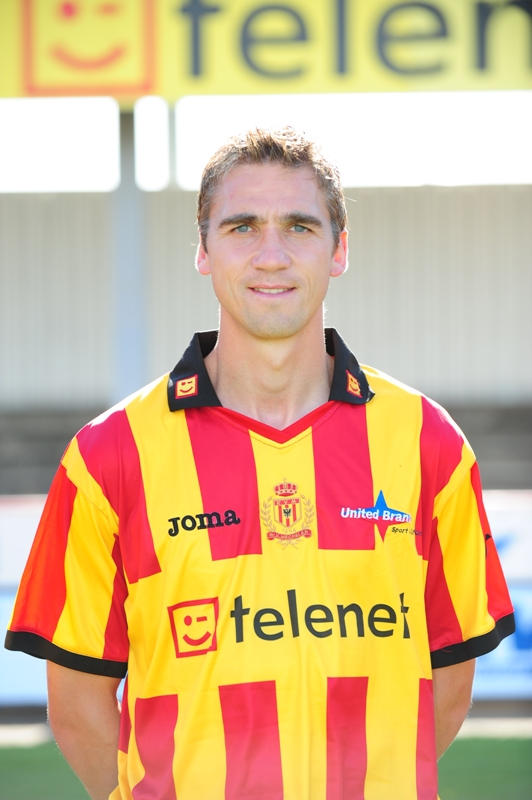
- Destorme with KV Mechelen

Personal information
- Date of birth: 30 August 1979 (age 47)
- Place of birth: Gent, Belgium
- Height: 1.87 m (6 ft 2 in)
- Position: Attacking midfielder

Senior career*
Years	Team	Apps	(Gls)
–2004	K.F.C. Evergem-Center		
2004–2005	HSV Hoek		
2005–2006	K.F.C. Evergem-Center		
2006–2009	FCV Dender EH	48	(14)
2009–2015	KV Mechelen	140	(25)
2014–2015	→ Waasland-Beveren (loan)	29	(5)
2015–2016	Waasland-Beveren	6	(0)
- * Club domestic league appearances and goals

David Destorme (born 30 August 1979) is a Belgian former professional footballer who played as an attacking midfielder.

== Career ==
On 10 June 2009, Destorme left FCV Dender EH to sign a four-year deal with KV Mechelen.
