= Jules Ottenstadion =

Stadium in Belgium

Coordinates: 51°01′53″N 3°45′58″E

- Den Ot
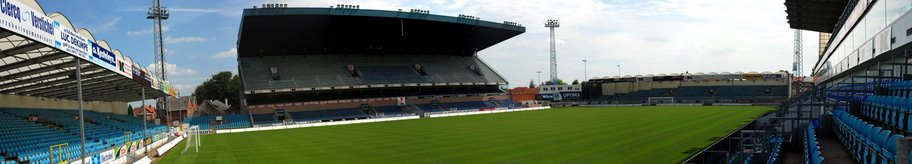
- Interactive map of Jules Ottenstadion
- Location: Gentbrugge
- Capacity: 12,919

Construction
- Opened: 1920
- Closed: 2013

Tenant
- K.A.A. Gent

Jules Ottenstadion was a multi-purpose stadium in Gentbrugge, Ghent, Belgium. It was used mostly for football matches and used to be the home ground of K.A.A. Gent. The stadium held 12,919 seats and was built in 1920. It was replaced as the club's home ground by the new Ghelamco Arena in 2013. At the end of the use of the stadium for the home matches of KAA Gent, it was simply called Ottenstadion by the people of Ghent. It was situated in the centre of a residential neighbourhood in the Bruiloftstraat in Gentbrugge.

== History ==
The stadium was built in 1920 and was officially opened on 22 August of that year by the Dauphin of that time, Prince Leopold. The stadium was named after Jules Otten, one of the founders of KAA Gent, which was called La Gantoise at that time.

During the 1920 Summer Olympics in Antwerp, it hosted the Italy-Egypt football match which the Italians won 2–1.

K.A.A. Gent played its home games at the stadium for 90 years, before moving to the new Ghelamco Arena, which is situated at the Ottergemsesteenweg. It was planned that the new stadium would be ready by the 2007–2008 season, but due to many delays, it wasn't opened until 2013. The new Arena with 20,000 seats was officially inaugurated on 17 July 2013.

The Jules Ottenstadium has been demolished and will be replaced by a residential environment.
