= List of Belgian football transfers summer 2014 =

This is a list of Belgian football transfers for the 2014 summer transfer window. Only transfers involving a team from the Belgian Pro League are listed.

The summer transfer window will open on 1 July 2014, although some transfers were announced prior to that date. Players without a club may join one at any time, either during or in between transfer windows. The transfer window ends on 1 September 2014, although a few completed transfers could still be announced a few days later.

== Sorted by date ==
=== January 2014 ===
| Date | Name | Moving from | Moving to | Fee | Note |
|---|---|---|---|---|---|
| 9 January 2014 | Christian Kabasele | Eupen | Genk | Undisclosed | |

=== February 2014 ===
| Date | Name | Moving from | Moving to | Fee | Note |
|---|---|---|---|---|---|
| 1 February 2014 | (Norway) Tom Høgli | Club Brugge | (Denmark) Copenhagen | Free | |
| 21 February 2014 | Jason Adesanya | ASV Geel | Mechelen | Undisclosed | |

=== March 2014 ===
| Date | Name | Moving from | Moving to | Fee | Note |
|---|---|---|---|---|---|
| 4 March 2014 | Sam Valcke | Londerzeel | Cercle Brugge | Undisclosed | |
| 7 March 2014 | (Serbia) Ivan Obradović | Free Agent | Mechelen | NA | |
| 16 March 2014 | (Sweden) Viktor Prodell | Mechelen | (Sweden) Elfsborg | Loan | |
| 18 March 2014 | Bjorn Ruytinx | OH Leuven | Oostende | Free | |
| 20 March 2014 | Olivier Werner | Mons | Cercle Brugge | Undisclosed | |
| 21 March 2014 | (Senegal) Elimane Coulibaly | Gent | Oostende | Undisclosed | (Note: Coulibaly was on loan from Gent to Kortrijk during the 2013–14 season. The loan ended and Coulibaly was sold to Oostende.) |
| 26 March 2014 | Laurent Depoitre | Oostende | Gent | Free | |

=== April 2014 ===
| Date | Name | Moving from | Moving to | Fee | Note |
|---|---|---|---|---|---|
| 2 April 2014 | Cyriel Dessers | OH Leuven | Lokeren | Undisclosed | |
| 4 April 2014 | Brian Vandenbussche | (Netherlands) Heerenveen | Gent | Free | |
| 7 April 2014 | Vincent Provoost | Mouscron-Péruwelz | Roeselare | Undisclosed | |
| 10 April 2014 | (France) Mikael Seoudi | Waasland-Beveren | Roeselare | Free | (Note: Seoudi was on loan from Waasland-Beveren to RWDM Brussels during the 2013–14 season. The loan ended and Seoudi was released to Roeselare.) |
| 14 April 2014 | (Mali) Kalifa Coulibaly | (France) PSG Youth Academy | Charleroi | Undisclosed | |
| 16 April 2014 | (Brazil) Fernando Canesin | Anderlecht | Oostende | Undisclosed | (Note: Canesin was already on loan from Anderlecht to Oostende during the 2013–14 season. The loan ended but Anderlecht and Oostende agreed on a full transfer of Canesin.) |
| 17 April 2014 | Thomas De Bie | Mechelen | Cercle Brugge | Undisclosed | |
| 22 April 2014 | (Mali) Kassim Doumbia | Waasland-Beveren | (Iceland) Hafnarfjarðar | Undisclosed | |
| 23 April 2014 | Laurens Vermijl | Lommel United | Genk | Undisclosed | |
| 25 April 2014 | Thomas Goddeeris | Cercle Brugge | Torhout | Undisclosed | (Note: Goddeeris was already on loan from Cercle Brugge to Torhout during the second half of the 2013–14 season. The loan ended but Cercle Brugge and Torhout agreed on a full transfer of Goddeeris.) |
| 29 April 2014 | (France) Jean Chopin | (France) Lens | Oostende | Undisclosed | |
| 29 April 2014 | Carl Hoefkens | Lierse | Oostende | Undisclosed | |
| 29 April 2014 | (France) Kalidou Koulibaly | Genk | (Italy) Napoli | ± 10 000 000 € | |

=== May 2014 ===
| Date | Name | Moving from | Moving to | Fee | Note |
|---|---|---|---|---|---|
| 2 May 2014 | Adriano Bertaccini | Club Brugge | Genk | Undisclosed | |
| 2 May 2014 | Paolino Bertaccini | Club Brugge | Genk | Undisclosed | |
| 2 May 2014 | Tim Matthys | Mons | Mechelen | Undisclosed | |
| 2 May 2014 | Stevy Okitokandjo | Gent | Mechelen | Undisclosed | |
| 4 May 2012 | (Benin) Frédéric Gounongbe | RWDM Brussels | Westerlo | Free | |
| 7 May 2012 | Xavier Gies | Anderlecht | Roeselare | Free | |
| 10 May 2014 | Nabil Jaadi | Anderlecht | (Italy) Udinese | Undisclosed | |
| 12 May 2014 | Daimy Deflem | Woluwe-Zaventem | Waasland-Beveren | Free | |
| 15 May 2014 | Mohamed Mrabet | Charleroi | Virton | Loan | |
| 16 May 2014 | Ibrahima Cissé | Standard Liège | Mechelen | Undisclosed | |
| 16 May 2014 | (Algeria) Sofiane Hanni | (Turkey) Ankaraspor | Mechelen | Undisclosed | |
| 18 May 2014 | (Germany) Richard Sukuta-Pasu | (Germany) 1. FC Kaiserslautern | Cercle Brugge | Undisclosed | |
| 19 May 2014 | Laurens Paulussen | Westerlo | Mechelen | Free | |
| 19 May 2014 | (Portugal) Jorge Teixeira | (Switzerland) Zürich | Standard Liège | Undisclosed | |
| 19 May 2014 | Julien Vercauteren | Lierse | (France) Nice | Undisclosed | |
| 20 May 2014 | Philippe Janssens | Westerlo | Aalst | Free | |
| 20 May 2014 | Jordan Lukaku | Anderlecht | Oostende | Undisclosed | (Note: Lukaku was already on loan from Anderlecht to Oostende during the 2013–14 season. The loan ended but Anderlecht and Oostende agreed on a full transfer of Lukaku.) |
| 20 May 2014 | (France) Adrien Trebel | (France) Nantes | Standard Liège | Undisclosed | |
| 23 May 2014 | (Burkina Faso) Elis Koulibaly | Anderlecht | Eendracht Aalst | Loan | |
| 23 May 2014 | Youri Lapage | Anderlecht | Eendracht Aalst | Loan | |
| 23 May 2014 | Arne Naudts | Cercle Brugge | Deinze | Loan | |
| 24 May 2014 | Jasper Van Der Heyden | Lierse | ASV Geel | Undisclosed | |
| 27 May 2014 | (Israel) Rami Gershon | Waasland-Beveren | Gent | Undisclosed | |
| 27 May 2014 | (Democratic Republic of the Congo) Cédric Mitu | Lokeren | Zulte Waregem | Free | |
| 28 May 2014 | Clinton Mata | Eupen | Charleroi | Undisclosed | |
| 29 May 2014 | (Croatia) Ante Blažević | (Croatia) Hajduk Split Reserves | Oostende | Undisclosed | |

=== End of 2013–14 season ===
After the end of the 2013–14 season, several players will return from loan to another club or will not have their contracts extended. These will be listed here when the date is otherwise not specified.

| Date | Name | Moving from | Moving to | Fee | Note |
|---|---|---|---|---|---|
| End of 2013–14 season | (Ivory Coast) Bobley Anderson | Zulte Waregem | (Spain) Málaga | Loan Return | |
| End of 2013–14 season | (Sweden) Samuel Armenteros | (Netherlands) Feyenoord | Anderlecht | Loan Return | |
| End of 2013–14 season | (France) Franck Berrier | Zulte Waregem | Oostende | Undisclosed | (Note: Berrier was already on loan from Zulte Waregem to Oostende during the 2013–14 season. The loan ended but Oostende used their option to acquire Berrier on a permanent basis.) |
| End of 2013–14 season | (Israel) Dudu Biton | (Spain) Alcorcón | Standard Liège | Loan Return | |
| End of 2013–14 season | (Panama) Roberto Chen | Zulte Waregem | (Spain) Málaga | Loan Return | |
| End of 2013–14 season | Jo Coppens | Cercle Brugge | Free Agent | Contract Ended | |
| End of 2013–14 season | Salvatore Crimi | Charleroi | Zulte Waregem | Loan Return | |
| End of 2013–14 season | Jimmy De Jonghe | Lierse | Club Brugge | Loan Return | |
| End of 2013–14 season | (Netherlands) Demy de Zeeuw | Anderlecht | (Russia) Spartak Moscow | Loan Return | |
| End of 2013–14 season | (France) Joris Delle | Cercle Brugge | (France) Nice | Loan Return | |
| End of 2013–14 season | (Serbia) Djordje Despotović | Lokeren | (Serbia) Red Star Belgrade | Free | |
| End of 2013–14 season | (Ivory Coast) Zié Diabaté | Gent | (France) Dijon | Loan Return | |
| End of 2013–14 season | (Senegal) Mbaye Diagne | Lierse | (Italy) Juventus | Loan Return | |
| End of 2013–14 season | Yassine El Ghanassy | (United Arab Emirates) Al Ain | Gent | Loan Return | |
| End of 2013–14 season | (Cameroon) Gaël Etock | Cercle Brugge | Free Agent | Contract Ended | |
| End of 2013–14 season | (Nigeria) Kehinde Fatai | Club Brugge | (Romania) Astra Giurgiu | Loan Return | |
| End of 2013–14 season | (Spain) Walter Fernández | (Romania) Petrolul Ploiești | Lokeren | Loan Return | |
| End of 2013–14 season | Thomas Foket | Oostende | Gent | Loan Return | |
| End of 2013–14 season | (Greece) Spyros Fourlanos | (Greece) AEL Kalloni | Club Brugge | Loan Return | |
| End of 2013–14 season | (France) Harlem Gnohéré | Mouscron-Péruwelz | Charleroi | Loan Return | |
| End of 2013–14 season | (Netherlands) Joey Godee | (Netherlands) Go Ahead Eagles | Cercle Brugge | Loan Return | |
| End of 2013–14 season | (Iceland) Eiður Guðjohnsen | Club Brugge | Free Agent | Contract Ended | |
| End of 2013–14 season | Geoffry Hairemans | Turnhout | Lierse | Loan Return | |
| End of 2013–14 season | Thorgan Hazard | Zulte Waregem | (England) Chelsea | Loan Return | |
| End of 2013–14 season | Koenraad Hendrickx | Cercle Brugge | Free Agent | Contract Ended | |
| End of 2013–14 season | Michaël Heylen | Kortrijk | Anderlecht | Loan Return | |
| End of 2013–14 season | (Estonia) Enar Jääger | Lierse | Free Agent | Released | |
| End of 2013–14 season | (Germany) Torben Joneleit | Genk | End of Career | NA | |
| End of 2013–14 season | (Denmark) Mads Junker | Mechelen | (India) Delhi Dynamos | Free | |
| End of 2013–14 season | Nathan Kabasele | (Netherlands) De Graafschap | Anderlecht | Loan Return | |
| End of 2013–14 season | (Turkey) Anıl Koç | (England) Charlton Athletic | Standard Liège | Loan Return | |
| End of 2013–14 season | (Democratic Republic of the Congo) Mulopo Kudimbana | Oostende | Anderlecht | Undisclosed | (Note: Kudimbana was already on loan from Oostende to Anderlecht during second half of the 2013–14 season. The loan ended but the transfer was now made permanent.) |
| End of 2013–14 season | Simon Ligot | (Hungary) Újpest | Standard Liège | Loan Return | |
| End of 2013–14 season | Tortol Lumanza | Sint-Truiden | Standard Liège | Loan Return | |
| End of 2013–14 season | (Brazil) Fernando Menegazzo | (Saudi Arabia) Al Shabab | Club Brugge | Free | |
| End of 2013–14 season | Niels Mestdagh | Hamme | Cercle Brugge | Loan Return | |
| End of 2013–14 season | (Switzerland) Elton Monteiro | (Portugal) Académica de Coimbra | Club Brugge | Loan Return | |
| End of 2013–14 season | (Luxembourg) Anthony Moris | Sint-Truiden | Standard Liège | Loan Return | |
| End of 2013–14 season | (Zimbabwe) Nyasha Mushekwi | Oostende | (South Africa) Mamelodi Sundowns | Loan Return | |
| End of 2013–14 season | (Nigeria) Kennedy Nwanganga | Westerlo | Genk | Loan Return | |
| End of 2013–14 season | (Cameroon) Fabrice Olinga | Zulte Waregem | (Spain) Málaga | Loan Return | |
| End of 2013–14 season | (France) Alexandre Oukidja | Mouscron-Péruwelz | (France) Lille | Loan Return | |
| End of 2013–14 season | (Germany) Marvin Pourié | Zulte Waregem | (Denmark) Copenhagen | Loan Return | |
| End of 2013–14 season | Benito Raman | Kortrijk | Gent | Loan Return | |
| End of 2013–14 season | (Portugal) Nuno Reis | Cercle Brugge | (Portugal) Sporting | Loan Return | |
| End of 2013–14 season | (Latvia) Valērijs Šabala | (Latvia) Skonto | Club Brugge | Loan Return | |
| End of 2013–14 season | (Netherlands) Bas Sibum | Waasland-Beveren | Free Agent | Contract Ended | |
| End of 2013–14 season | (Slovakia) Peter Sládek | Oostende | (Slovakia) Spartak Myjava | Loan Return | |
| End of 2013–14 season | (France) Alassane També | Antwerp | Kortrijk | Loan Return | |
| End of 2013–14 season | Mehdi Tarfi | Zulte Waregem | Anderlecht | Loan Return | |
| End of 2013–14 season | Mohammed Tchité | Club Brugge | Free Agent | Contract Ended | |
| End of 2013–14 season | Bernd Thijs | Gent | End of Career | NA | |
| End of 2013–14 season | (North Macedonia) Aleksandar Trajkovski | Mechelen | Zulte Waregem | Loan Return | |
| End of 2013–14 season | (Nigeria) Michael Uchebo | Cercle Brugge | Free Agent | Contract Ended | |
| End of 2013–14 season | Lukas Van Eenoo | OH Leuven | Cercle Brugge | Loan Return | |
| End of 2013–14 season | (Venezuela) Ronald Vargas | Anderlecht | (Turkey) Balıkesirspor | Free | |
| End of 2013–14 season | (Spain) Fede Vico | Oostende | Anderlecht | Loan Return | |
| End of 2013–14 season | (Iceland) Arnar Viðarsson | Cercle Brugge | End of Career | NA | |
| End of 2013–14 season | (Greece) Valentinos Vlachos | (Greece) Aris | Club Brugge | Loan Return | |
| End of 2013–14 season | (Scotland) Tony Watt | Lierse | (Scotland) Celtic | Loan Return | |

=== June 2014 ===
| Date | Name | Moving from | Moving to | Fee | Note |
|---|---|---|---|---|---|
| 4 June 2014 | Ludovic Buysens | OH Leuven | Lierse | Free | |
| 4 June 2014 | (Guinea) Alhassane Keita | (France) Metz | Lierse | Undisclosed | |
| 4 June 2014 | (Netherlands) Evander Sno | (Netherlands) RKC | Westerlo | Free | |
| 6 June 2014 | (Netherlands) Mitch Apau | (Netherlands) RKC | Westerlo | Undisclosed | |
| 6 June 2014 | Leandro Trossard | Genk | Lommel United | Loan | (Note: Trossard was on loan from Genk to Westerlo during the 2013–14 season. The loan ended and Trossard was now loaned to Lommel United.) |
| 7 June 2014 | (Serbia) Dalibor Veselinović | Anderlecht | Mechelen | Undisclosed | (Note: Veselinović was on loan from Anderlecht to Waasland-Beveren during the 2013–14 season. The loan ended and Veselinović was sold to Mechelen.) |
| 8 June 2014 | Mohamed Soumaré | Anderlecht | (Italy) Avellino | Undisclosed | |
| 9 June 2014 | (Nepal) Bimal Magar | Free Agent | Anderlecht | NA | |
| 11 June 2014 | Gertjan Martens | Oostende | Antwerp | Loan | |
| 11 June 2014 | Arno Verschueren | OH Leuven | Westerlo | Undisclosed | |
| 12 June 2014 | (Croatia) Stipe Bačelić-Grgić | (Croatia) Hrvatski Dragovoljac | Cercle Brugge | Undisclosed | |
| 12 June 2014 | (Algeria) Ramy Bensebaini | (Algeria) Paradou | Lierse | Loan | |
| 12 June 2014 | Massimo Bruno | Anderlecht | (Austria) Red Bull Salzburg | Undisclosed | |
| 12 June 2014 | (France) Baptiste Martin | Kortrijk | (France) Clermont Foot | Undisclosed | |
| 12 June 2014 | Mustapha Oussalah | Kortrijk | Gent | Undisclosed | |
| 12 June 2014 | (France) Benoît Poulain | (France) Nîmes | Kortrijk | Free | |
| 13 June 2014 | (France) Karim Belhocine | Waasland-Beveren | Gent | Free | |
| 13 June 2014 | (France) Pierre Bourdin | (France) Paris Saint-Germain Academy | Cercle Brugge | Undisclosed | |
| 13 June 2014 | (Greece) Spyros Fourlanos | Club Brugge | (Greece) Panionios | Undisclosed | |
| 13 June 2014 | (Bosnia and Herzegovina) Nermin Zolotić | (Bosnia and Herzegovina) Željezničar Sarajevo | Gent | Undisclosed | |
| 14 June 2014 | (Senegal) Christophe Diandy | Mons | Charleroi | Loan | |
| 14 June 2014 | Noë Dussenne | Mons | Cercle Brugge | Free | |
| 14 June 2014 | (Colombia) Jaime Alfonso Ruiz | Westerlo | Heist | Undisclosed | |
| 14 June 2014 | Karim Tarfi | Anderlecht | (Netherlands) De Graafschap | Undisclosed | |
| 16 June 2014 | Michaël Clepkens | Kortrijk | (Luxembourg) F91 Dudelange | Undisclosed | |
| 16 June 2014 | (Denmark) Thomas Enevoldsen | Mechelen | (Denmark) AaB | Loan | |
| 16 June 2014 | (Cameroon) Dorge Kouemaha | (Turkey) Adana Demirspor | Lierse | Undisclosed | |
| 17 June 2014 | Georgios Kaminiaris | Oostende | Mons | Undisclosed | |
| 17 June 2014 | (Senegal) Cheikhou Kouyaté | Anderlecht | (England) West Ham | 9 000 000 € | |
| 17 June 2014 | (France) Sloan Privat | Gent | (France) SM Caen | Loan | |
| 17 June 2014 | (Netherlands) Danny Verbeek | Standard Liège | (Netherlands) Utrecht | Loan | (Note: Verbeek was on loan from Standard Liège to NAC Breda during both the 2012–13 and 2013–14 seasons. The loan ended and Verbeek was now loaned to Utrecht.) |
| 18 June 2014 | (Serbia) Adam Marušić | (Serbia) Voždovac | Kortrijk | Undisclosed | |
| 18 June 2014 | (Serbia) Sergej Milinković-Savić | (Serbia) Vojvodina | Genk | Undisclosed | |
| 18 June 2014 | (Morocco) Zakaria M'Sila | Gent | Waasland-Beveren | Undisclosed | |
| 18 June 2014 | Benny Rogiest | RWDM Brussels | Waasland-Beveren | Free | |
| 18 June 2014 | (Georgia (country)) Luka Zarandia | (Georgia (country)) Lokomotivi Tbilisi | Genk | Undisclosed | |
| 19 June 2014 | (Senegal) Boubacar Dialiba | Mechelen | (Poland) Cracovia | Undisclosed | |
| 19 June 2014 | Denis Dessaer | Oostende | Woluwe-Zaventem | Undisclosed | |
| 20 June 2014 | (Netherlands) Tom Boere | Gent | (Netherlands) FC Eindhoven | Undisclosed | (Note: Boere was on loan from Gent to Hoogstraten during the 2013–14 season. The loan ended and Boere was sold to Eindhoven.) |
| 20 June 2014 | Davy De fauw | Zulte Waregem | Club Brugge | Undisclosed | |
| 20 June 2014 | (Brazil) Wigor Alan Do Nascimento | (Brazil) Capivariano | Anderlecht | Undisclosed | |
| 20 June 2014 | (Bosnia and Herzegovina) Ervin Zukanović | Gent | (Italy) Chievo | Loan | |
| 21 June 2014 | (England) Chuks Aneke | (England) Arsenal | Zulte Waregem | Free | (Note: Aneke was on loan from Arsenal to Crewe Alexandra during the 2013–14 season. The loan ended and Aneke was released to Zulte Waregem.) |
| 21 June 2014 | Yoni Buyens | Standard Liège | (England) Charlton Athletic | Loan | |
| 21 June 2014 | Kylian Hazard | WS Bruxelles | Zulte Waregem | Undisclosed | |
| 21 June 2014 | Jérémy Huyghebaert | Mouscron-Péruwelz | WS Bruxelles | Undisclosed | |
| 21 June 2014 | (Turkey) Sefa Isçi | Anderlecht | Zulte Waregem | Free | |
| 22 June 2014 | (Tunisia) Fabien Camus | Genk | (France) Evian | Loan | |
| 22 June 2014 | (Netherlands) Sergio Padt | Gent | (Netherlands) Groningen | Undisclosed | |
| 23 June 2014 | (Netherlands) Marco Bizot | (Netherlands) Groningen | Genk | Undisclosed | |
| 25 June 2014 | (Zambia) Rodgers Kola | Gent | (Israel) Ironi Kiryat Shmona | Loan | |
| 26 June 2014 | Alessio Alessandro | Genk | (Netherlands) MVV | Loan | |
| 26 June 2014 | Michy Batshuayi | Standard Liège | (France) Marseille | Undisclosed | |
| 26 June 2014 | Jordy Croux | Genk | (Netherlands) MVV | Loan | (Note: Croux was on loan from Genk to OH Leuven during the second half of the 2013–14 season. The loan ended and Croux was loaned to MVV.) |
| 26 June 2014 | (Egypt) Hossam Ghaly | Lierse | (Egypt) Al Ahly | Undisclosed | |
| 26 June 2014 | Jonathan Kindermans | Anderlecht | (Netherlands) Telstar | Loan | |
| 26 June 2014 | Pieterjan Monteyne | Mons | Mouscron-Péruwelz | Free | |
| 26 June 2014 | Willem Ofori | Genk | (Netherlands) MVV | Loan | |
| 26 June 2014 | Stef Peeters | Genk | (Netherlands) MVV | Loan | |
| 26 June 2014 | (Brazil) Robson | OH Leuven | Waasland-Beveren | Undisclosed | |
| 27 June 2014 | Jonathan Benteke | Visé | Zulte Waregem | Undisclosed | |
| 27 June 2014 | (Bosnia and Herzegovina) Armin Čerimagić | Gent | (Poland) Górnik Zabrze | Undisclosed | (Note: Čerimagić was on loan from Gent to Eendracht Aalst during the 2013–14 season. The loan ended and Čerimagić was sold to Górnik Zabrze.) |
| 27 June 2014 | (France) William Vainqueur | Standard Liège | (Russia) Dynamo Moscow | Undisclosed | |
| 28 June 2014 | Bram Verbist | Cercle Brugge | (Netherlands) Roda JC | Undisclosed | (Note: Verbist was on loan from Cercle Brugge to Brøndby during the second half of the 2013–14 season. The loan ended and Verbist was sold to Roda JC.) |
| 29 June 2014 | (France) Romain Reynaud | Kortrijk | OH Leuven | Free | (Note: Reynaud was on already loan from Kortrijk to OH Leuven during the second half of the 2013–14 season. The loan ended, but Reynaud was released and moved to OHL as a free agent player.) |
| 30 June 2014 | (Egypt) Luca Badr | Lierse | (Egypt) Al Ahly | Undisclosed | |
| 30 June 2014 | Jentl Gaethofs | Genk | Lommel United | Loan | (Note: Gaethofs was signed from Lommel United and immediately loaned out back to his former team.) |
| 30 June 2014 | (Slovenia) Martin Milec | (Slovenia) Maribor | Standard Liège | Undisclosed | |
| 30 June 2014 | David Pollet | Anderlecht | Gent | € 1 500 000 | |

=== July 2014 ===
| Date | Name | Moving from | Moving to | Fee | Note |
|---|---|---|---|---|---|
| 1 July 2014 | (Brazil) Ederson | Charleroi | (Greece) Asteras Tripolis | Undisclosed | |
| 1 July 2014 | Sven Kums | Zulte Waregem | Gent | Undisclosed | |
| 1 July 2014 | (Costa Rica) John Jairo Ruiz | (France) Lille | Oostende | Loan | |
| 1 July 2014 | (Poland) Grzegorz Sandomierski | Genk | (Poland) Zawisza Bydgoszcz | Undisclosed | (Note: Sandomierski was on loan from Genk to Dinamo Zagreb during the 2013–14 season. The loan ended and Sandomierski was sold to Zawisza Bydgoszcz.) |
| 2 July 2014 | (France) Yarouba Cissako | (France) Monaco | Zulte Waregem | Loan | |
| 2 July 2014 | (Brazil) Kanu | Standard Liège | Free Agent | Contract terminated | |
| 3 July 2014 | (France) Anice Badri | (France) Lille | Mouscron-Péruwelz | Undisclosed | (Note: Badri and Michel were already on loan from Lille to Mouscron-Péruwelz during the 2013–14 season. The loan ended but both players were now transferred on a permanent basis.) |
| 3 July 2014 | (France) Julian Michel | (France) Lille | Mouscron-Péruwelz | Undisclosed | |
| 3 July 2014 | Pierre-Yves Ngawa | Standard Liège | Lierse | Undisclosed | (Note: Ngawa was on loan from Standard Liège to Újpest during the 2013–14 season. The loan ended and Ngawa was sold to Lierse.) |
| 3 July 2014 | (France) Sébastien Pennacchio | (France) Lille | Mouscron-Péruwelz | Loan | (Note: Pennacchio, Perez and Peyre were already on loan from Lille to Mouscron-Péruwelz during the 2013–14 season. The loans were extended with another season.) |
| 3 July 2014 | (France) Nicolas Perez | (France) Lille | Mouscron-Péruwelz | Loan | |
| 3 July 2014 | (France) Thibault Peyre | (France) Lille | Mouscron-Péruwelz | Loan | |
| 4 July 2014 | Sven Dhoest | Club Brugge | Mouscron-Péruwelz | Loan | |
| 4 July 2014 | (France) Florent Hanin | (Portugal) Braga | Lierse | Undisclosed | |
| 4 July 2014 | (Turkey) Alpaslan Öztürk | Standard Liège | (Turkey) Kasımpaşa | Loan | (Note: Öztürk was already on loan from Standard Liège to Kasımpaşa during the second half of the 2013–14 season. The loan was extended with another season.) |
| 4 July 2014 | Alessio Staelens | Cercle Brugge | Deinze | Loan | |
| 7 July 2014 | (France) Julian Jeanvier | (France) Lille | Mouscron-Péruwelz | Loan | |
| 7 July 2014 | (France) Lynel Kitambala | (France) Saint-Étienne | Charleroi | Undisclosed | |
| 7 July 2014 | (France) Teddy Mézague | (France) Montpellier | Mouscron-Péruwelz | Undisclosed | |
| 8 July 2014 | (Ghana) Enoch Adu | Club Brugge | (Sweden) Malmö | Undisclosed | (Note: Adu was on loan from Club Brugge to Stabæk during the second half of the 2013–14 season. The loan ended and Adu was sold to Malmö.) |
| 8 July 2014 | (Norway) Mushaga Bakenga | Club Brugge | (Germany) Eintracht Braunschweig | Loan | (Note: Bakenga was on loan from Club Brugge to Esbjerg during the 2013–14 season. The loan ended and Bakenga was now loaned to Braunschweig.) |
| 8 July 2014 | Zinho Gano | Club Brugge | Mouscron-Péruwelz | Loan | (Note: Gano was on loan from Club Brugge to Lommel United during the 2013–14 season. The loan ended and Gano was now loaned to Mouscron-Péruwelz.) |
| 8 July 2014 | (Guinea) Djibril Paye | (Moldova) Sheriff Tiraspol | Zulte Waregem | Undisclosed | |
| 8 July 2014 | Birger Verstraete | Club Brugge | Mouscron-Péruwelz | Loan | |
| 9 July 2014 | Guillaume Gillet | Anderlecht | (France) Bastia | Loan | |
| 9 July 2014 | (Netherlands) Glynor Plet | (Israel) Hapoel Be'er Sheva | Zulte Waregem | Undisclosed | |
| 10 July 2014 | Nils Schouterden | Eupen | Westerlo | Undisclosed | |
| 10 July 2014 | (North Macedonia) Ivan Tričkovski | Club Brugge | Free Agent | Released | (Note: Tričkovski was on loan from Club Brugge to Waasland-Beveren during the 2013–14 season. The loan ended after which Club Brugge and Tričkovski mutually agreed to terminate the contract.) |
| 11 July 2014 | (Israel) Tal Ben Haim | Standard Liège | (England) Charlton Athletic | Undisclosed | |
| 11 July 2014 | (France) Pierrick Cros | (France) Sochaux | Mouscron-Péruwelz | Undisclosed | |
| 11 July 2014 | (Mali) Abdoulay Diaby | (France) Lille | Mouscron-Péruwelz | Loan | (Note: Diaby was already on loan from Lille to Mouscron-Péruwelz during the 2013–14 season. The loan ended but was extended for another season.) |
| 11 July 2014 | Charni Ekangamene | (England) Manchester United | Zulte Waregem | Undisclosed | |
| 11 July 2014 | (France) Nolan Mbemba | (France) Lille | Mouscron-Péruwelz | Loan | |
| 12 July 2014 | Nicolas Delporte | Gent | OH Leuven | Undisclosed | |
| 13 July 2014 | (Brazil) Arthur Henrique | (Bulgaria) Botev Plovdiv | Lokeren | Undisclosed | |
| 14 July 2014 | Wouter Corstjens | Gent | Waasland-Beveren | Loan | (Note: Corstjens was on loan from Gent to Lierse during the 2013–14 season. The loan ended and now Corstjens was loaned to Waasland-Beveren.) |
| 14 July 2014 | Laurent Henkinet | Standard Liège | Kortrijk | Undisclosed | (Note: Henkinet was on loan from Standard Liège to Dessel Sport during the second half of the 2013–14 season. The loan ended and now Henkinet was sold to Kortrijk.) |
| 14 July 2014 | David Hubert | Gent | Waasland-Beveren | Loan | (Note: Hubert was on loan from Gent to Hapoel Be'er Sheva during the 2013–14 season. The loan ended and now Hubert was loaned to Waasland-Beveren.) |
| 14 July 2014 | (Sweden) Fredrik Stenman | Club Brugge | (Sweden) Djurgårdens IF | Undisclosed | |
| 15 July 2014 | Mohammed Aoulad | Sint-Truiden | Westerlo | Undisclosed | |
| 15 July 2014 | (Portugal) Tiago Ferreira | (Portugal) Porto B | Zulte Waregem | Undisclosed | |
| 15 July 2014 | (France) Harlem Gnohéré | Charleroi | Mons | Undisclosed | |
| 15 July 2014 | (Romania) George Țucudean | Standard Liège | (England) Charlton Athletic | Undisclosed | (Note: Țucudean was on loan from Standard Liège to Dinamo București during the 2013–14 season. The loan ended and Țucudean was sold to Charlton Athletic.) |
| 16 July 2014 | Bruno Godeau | Zulte Waregem | Westerlo | Undisclosed | |
| 16 July 2014 | (France) Steeven Langil | (France) Guingamp | Mouscron-Péruwelz | Undisclosed | |
| 16 July 2014 | (Greece) Apostolos Vellios | (England) Everton | Lierse | Undisclosed | |
| 17 July 2014 | (France) Tristan Dingomé | (France) Monaco | Mouscron-Péruwelz | Undisclosed | |
| 19 July 2014 | (The Gambia) Ibou | OH Leuven | Waasland-Beveren | Undisclosed | |
| 22 July 2014 | (Portugal) Manuel Curto | (Poland) Zagłębie Lubin | Lierse | Undisclosed | |
| 22 July 2014 | (Greece) Sokratis Dioudis | (Greece) Aris | Club Brugge | Undisclosed | |
| 24 July 2014 | Matthias Trenson | Westerlo | OH Leuven | Undisclosed | |
| 25 July 2014 | Stevy Okitokandjo | Mechelen | Roeselare | Loan | |
| 25 July 2014 | Kenny Van Hoevelen | Mechelen | OH Leuven | Free | (Note: Van Hoevelen was on loan from Mechelen to RKC Waalwijk during the 2013–14 season. The loan ended and Van Hoevelen was released to OHL.) |
| 28 July 2014 | Hervé Kage | Gent | Genk | Undisclosed | |
| 28 July 2014 | (Georgia (country)) Tornike Okriashvili | (Ukraine) Shakhtar Donetsk | Genk | Undisclosed | |
| 28 July 2014 | (Scotland) Tony Watt | (Scotland) Celtic | Standard Liège | Undisclosed | |
| 29 July 2014 | (Tunisia) Hamdi Harbaoui | Lokeren | Qatar SC | € 2 500 000 | |
| 30 July 2014 | (Ghana) David Addy | (Portugal) Vitória Guimarães | Waasland-Beveren | Undisclosed | |
| 30 July 2014 | Christian Brüls | Gent | (France) Rennes | Undisclosed | (Note: Brüls was on loan from Gent to Nice during the 2013–14 season. The loan ended and Brüls was sold to OHL.) |
| 30 July 2014 | (Nigeria) Imoh Ezekiel | Standard Liège | (Qatar) Al-Arabi | Undisclosed | |
| 30 July 2014 | (Senegal) Jamal Thiaré | Charleroi | (France) Avranches | Loan | |

=== August 2014 ===
| Date | Name | Moving from | Moving to | Fee | Note |
|---|---|---|---|---|---|
| 2 August 2014 | David Destorme | Mechelen | Waasland-Beveren | Loan | |
| 5 August 2014 | (Germany) Christian Dorda | (Netherlands) Utrecht | Westerlo | Free | |
| 5 August 2014 | Jari Vandeputte | Gent | Roeselare | Loan | |
| 6 August 2014 | (North Macedonia) Besart Abdurahimi | (Croatia) Zagreb | Lokeren | Undisclosed | |
| 6 August 2014 | Lens Annab | Lierse | ASV Geel | Undisclosed | |
| 7 August 2014 | Rik Impens | Gent | Roeselare | Loan | |
| 7 August 2014 | (France) Nicolas Penneteau | (France) Valenciennes | Charleroi | Undisclosed | |
| 8 August 2014 | (Colombia) Darwin Andrade | (Hungary) Újpest | Standard Liège | Loan | |
| 8 August 2014 | (Haiti) Jeff Louis | (France) Nancy | Standard Liège | Undisclosed | |
| 8 August 2014 | Evariste Ngolok | OH Leuven | Lokeren | Undisclosed | |
| 8 August 2014 | (Israel) Kenny Hasan Sayef | (Israel) Hapoel Nir Ramat HaSharon | Gent | Undisclosed | |
| 9 August 2014 | (Switzerland) Elton Monteiro | Club Brugge | (Portugal) Braga | Undisclosed | |
| 11 August 2014 | (Senegal) Mbaye Leye | Zulte Waregem | Lokeren | Free | |
| 12 August 2014 | Jeffrey Rentmeister | Westerlo | (England) Blackpool | Undisclosed | |
| 13 August 2014 | Steven Defour | (Portugal) Porto | Anderlecht | Undisclosed | |
| 13 August 2014 | Anthony Van Loo | Mechelen | Kortrijk | Free | |
| 13 August 2014 | (Croatia) Ante Vukušić | (Italy) Pescara | Waasland-Beveren | Loan | |
| 14 August 2014 | Lukas Van Eenoo | Cercle Brugge | Kortrijk | Undisclosed | |
| 14 August 2014 | Mohamed Messoudi | Free Agent | Zulte Waregem | NA | (Note: Messoudi was fired by Oud-Heverlee Leuven a few days before the transfer for violent behaviour after punching a player in the face during a friendly.) |
| 15 August 2014 | Jimmy De Jonghe | Club Brugge | Roeselare | Loan | |
| 15 August 2014 | (Denmark) Jim Larsen | Club Brugge | (Denmark) Midtjylland | Undisclosed | |
| 15 August 2014 | (Nigeria) Kennedy Nwanganga | Genk | Roeselare | Loan | |
| 19 August 2014 | (Senegal) Ricardo Faty | (France) Ajaccio | Standard Liège | Undisclosed | |
| 19 August 2014 | Kristof Van Hout | Genk | (India) Delhi Dynamos | Undisclosed | |
| 20 August 2014 | (France) Damien Dussaut | (France) Valenciennes | Standard Liège | Undisclosed | |
| 20 August 2014 | (Albania) Mërgim Vojvoda | Standard Liège | Sint-Truiden | Loan | |
| 22 August 2014 | Karel Geraerts | OH Leuven | Charleroi | Free | |
| 25 August 2014 | (Latvia) Valērijs Šabala | Club Brugge | (Cyprus) Anorthosis Famagusta | Loan | |
| 26 August 2014 | (Brazil) Vinícius Araújo | (Spain) Valencia | Standard Liège | Loan | |
| 27 August 2014 | (Sweden) Samuel Armenteros | Anderlecht | (Netherlands) Willem II | Loan | |
| 28 August 2014 | (Indonesia) Arthur Irawan | (Spain) Atlético Malagueño | Waasland-Beveren | Free | |
| 28 August 2014 | (France) Jérémy Labor | (France) Monaco | Zulte Waregem | Undisclosed | |
| 29 August 2014 | (France) Maxime Colin | (France) Troyes | Anderlecht | Undisclosed | |
| 29 August 2014 | Geoffry Hairemans | Lierse | Heist | Undisclosed | |
| 29 August 2014 | (Cameroon) Éric Matoukou | (Ukraine) Dnipro Dnipropetrovsk | Lierse | Undisclosed | (Note: Matoukou was on loan from Dnipro Dnipropetrovsk to Volyn Lutsk during the 2013–14 season. The loan ended and Matoukou was sold to Lierse.) |
| 29 August 2014 | Vadis Odjidja-Ofoe | Club Brugge | (England) Norwich City | Undisclosed | |
| 29 August 2014 | Gilles Ruyssen | Gent | Westerlo | Undisclosed | |
| 29 August 2014 | (Australia) James Troisi | (Italy) Juventus | Zulte Waregem | Undisclosed | |
| 30 August 2014 | Yohan Brouckaert | Mouscron-Péruwelz | OH Leuven | Undisclosed | |
| 30 August 2014 | (Gabon) Frédéric Bulot | Standard Liège | (England) Charlton Athletic | Loan | |
| 30 August 2014 | (Cameroon) Eyong Enoh | (Turkey) Antalyaspor | Standard Liège | Undisclosed | |
| 30 August 2014 | (Brazil) Felipe Gedoz | (Uruguay) Defensor | Club Brugge | Undisclosed | |
| 30 August 2014 | (Colombia) José Izquierdo | (Colombia) Once Caldas | Club Brugge | Undisclosed | |
| 30 August 2014 | Anthony Limbombe | Genk | (Netherlands) NEC | Undisclosed | |
| 31 August 2014 | (Croatia) Fran Brodić | (Croatia) Dinamo Zagreb | Club Brugge | Undisclosed | |
| 31 August 2014 | Dolly Menga | Lierse | (Portugal) Benfica | Undisclosed | |
| 31 August 2014 | (Chile) Francisco Silva | (Spain) Osasuna | Club Brugge | Loan | |
| 31 August 2014 | (Netherlands) Ruud Vormer | (Netherlands) Feyenoord | Club Brugge | Undisclosed | |

=== September 2014 ===
| Date | Name | Moving from | Moving to | Fee | Note |
|---|---|---|---|---|---|
| 1 September 2014 | (Guinea-Bissau) Amido Baldé | (Scotland) Celtic | Waasland-Beveren | Loan | |
| 1 September 2014 | (Israel) Dudu Biton | Standard Liège | (Slovenia) Maribor | Loan | |
| 1 September 2014 | (Serbia) Aleksandar Čavrić | (Serbia) OFK Beograd | Genk | Undisclosed | |
| 1 September 2014 | (Guinea) Ibrahima Conté | Zulte Waregem | Anderlecht | Undisclosed | |
| 1 September 2014 | (French Guiana) Roy Contout | (France) Sochaux-Montbéliard | Mouscron-Péruwelz | Free | |
| 1 September 2014 | Tuur Dierckx | Club Brugge | Kortrijk | Loan | |
| 1 September 2014 | (Central African Republic) Habib Habibou | Gent | (France) Rennes | Undisclosed | |
| 1 September 2014 | David Henen | Anderlecht | (Greece) Olympiacos | Undisclosed | |
| 1 September 2014 | (Ghana) Abdul-Yakuni Iddi | Mechelen | OH Leuven | Loan | |
| 1 September 2014 | (Denmark) Jesper Jørgensen | Club Brugge | Zulte Waregem | Undisclosed | |
| 1 September 2014 | Thomas Kaminski | Anderlecht | (Cyprus) Anorthosis Famagusta | Loan | |
| 1 September 2014 | (Turkey) Anıl Koç | Standard Liège | Sint-Truiden | Loan | |
| 1 September 2014 | Maxime Lestienne | Club Brugge | (Qatar) Al-Arabi | Undisclosed | |
| 1 September 2014 | Simon Ligot | Standard Liège | Visé | Loan | |
| 1 September 2014 | (Kenya) Ayub Masika | Genk | Lierse | Loan | |
| 1 September 2014 | Yannis Mbombo | Standard Liège | (France) Auxerre | Loan | |
| 1 September 2014 | (Serbia) Luka Milivojević | Anderlecht | (Greece) Olympiacos | Loan | |
| 1 September 2014 | Benjamin Mokulu | Mechelen | (France) Bastia | Loan | |
| 1 September 2014 | (Luxembourg) Anthony Moris | Standard Liège | Free Agent | Released | |
| 1 September 2014 | Jens Naessens | Zulte Waregem | Mechelen | Undisclosed | |
| 1 September 2014 | (Burundi) Valery Nahayo | Gent | Free Agent | Contract terminated | |
| 1 September 2014 | (Denmark) Lasse Nielsen | (Netherlands) NEC | Gent | Loan | |
| 1 September 2014 | (Brazil) Ygor Nogueira | (Brazil) Fluminense | Gent | Loan | |
| 1 September 2014 | (Nigeria) Kim Ojo | Genk | (Hungary) Újpest | Loan | |
| 1 September 2014 | (Cameroon) Willie Overtoom | (Netherlands) AZ | Zulte Waregem | Free | |
| 1 September 2014 | Tom Rosenthal | (England) Watford | Zulte Waregem | Undisclosed | |
| 1 September 2014 | Jeroen Simaeys | Genk | (Russia) Krylia Sovetov Samara | Undisclosed | |
| 1 September 2014 | (Spain) Fede Vico | Anderlecht | (Spain) Córdoba | Loan | |
| 1 September 2014 | (Spain) Jonathan Viera | (Spain) Valencia | Standard Liège | Undisclosed | |
| 1 September 2014 | Jelle Vossen | Genk | (England) Middlesbrough | Loan | |

== Sorted by team ==
=== Anderlecht ===
In:

| No. | Pos. | Nation | Player |
|---|---|---|---|
| 12 | DF | FRA | Maxime Colin (from (France) Troyes) |
| 16 | MF | BEL | Steven Defour (from (Portugal) Porto) |
| 20 | MF | GUI | Ibrahima Conté (from Zulte Waregem) |
| 24 | DF | BEL | Michaël Heylen (loan return from Kortrijk) |
| 26 | GK | COD | Mulopo Kudimbana (was on loan from Oostende, now bought) |
| 40 | MF | BRA | Wigor Alan Do Nascimento (from (Brazil) Capivariano) |
| 42 | FW | BEL | Nathan Kabasele (loan return from (Netherlands) De Graafschap) |
| — | FW | NEP | Bimal Magar (free agent) |
| — | MF | BEL | Mehdi Tarfi (loan return from Zulte Waregem) |

Out:

| No. | Pos. | Nation | Player |
|---|---|---|---|
| 6 | MF | NED | Demy de Zeeuw (loan return to (Russia) Spartak Moscow) |
| 8 | MF | SRB | Luka Milivojević (on loan to (Greece) Olympiacos) |
| 11 | FW | BEL | David Pollet (to Gent) |
| 13 | GK | BEL | Thomas Kaminski (on loan to (Cyprus) Anorthosis Famagusta) |
| 16 | DF | SEN | Cheikhou Kouyaté (to (England) West Ham) |
| 17 | MF | BEL | Massimo Bruno (to (Austria) Red Bull Salzburg) |
| 30 | MF | BEL | Guillaume Gillet (on loan to (France) Bastia) |
| 70 | MF | VEN | Ronald Vargas (to (Turkey) Balıkesirspor) |
| — | FW | SWE | Samuel Armenteros (was on loan to (Netherlands) Feyenoord, now loaned to (Netherlands) Willem II) |
| — | FW | BRA | Fernando Canesin (was on loan to Oostende, now sold) |
| — | GK | BEL | Xavier Gies (to Roeselare) |
| — | FW | BEL | David Henen (to (Greece) Olympiacos) |
| — | DF | TUR | Sefa Isçi (to Zulte Waregem) |
| — | MF | BEL | Nabil Jaadi (to (Italy) Udinese) |
| — | MF | BEL | Jonathan Kindermans (on loan to (Netherlands) Telstar) |
| — | FW | BFA | Elis Koulibaly (on loan to Eendracht Aalst) |
| — | FW | BEL | Youri Lapage (on loan to Eendracht Aalst) |
| — | DF | BEL | Jordan Lukaku (was on loan to Oostende, now sold) |
| — | FW | BEL | Mohamed Soumaré (to (Italy) Avellino) |
| — | MF | BEL | Karim Tarfi (to (Netherlands) De Graafschap) |
| — | FW | SRB | Dalibor Veselinović (was on loan to Waasland-Beveren, now sold to Mechelen) |
| — | MF | ESP | Fede Vico (was on loan to Oostende, now loaned to (Spain) Córdoba) |

=== Cercle Brugge ===
In:

| No. | Pos. | Nation | Player |
|---|---|---|---|
| 1 | GK | BEL | Olivier Werner (from Mons) |
| 3 | DF | BEL | Noë Dussenne (from Mons) |
| 10 | MF | CRO | Stipe Bačelić-Grgić (from (Croatia) Hrvatski Dragovoljac) |
| 11 | FW | BEL | Sam Valcke (from Londerzeel) |
| 14 | MF | BEL | Lukas Van Eenoo (loan return from OH Leuven) |
| 15 | DF | FRA | Pierre Bourdin (from (France) Paris Saint-Germain Academy) |
| 22 | FW | NED | Joey Godee (loan return from (Netherlands) Go Ahead Eagles) |
| 42 | GK | BEL | Thomas De Bie (from Mechelen) |
| 89 | FW | GER | Richard Sukuta-Pasu (from (Germany) 1. FC Kaiserslautern) |
| — | DF | BEL | Niels Mestdagh (loan return from Hamme) |

Out:

| No. | Pos. | Nation | Player |
|---|---|---|---|
| 5 | DF | POR | Nuno Reis (loan return to (Portugal) Sporting) |
| 6 | MF | ISL | Arnar Viðarsson (retired) |
| 10 | FW | NGR | Michael Uchebo (end of contract) |
| 11 | FW | CMR | Gaël Etock (end of contract) |
| 14 | MF | BEL | Lukas Van Eenoo (to Kortrijk) |
| 18 | GK | FRA | Joris Delle (loan return to (France) Nice) |
| 20 | DF | BEL | Thomas Goddeeris (was on loan to Torhout, now sold) |
| 32 | MF | BEL | Alessio Staelens (on loan to Deinze) |
| 34 | FW | BEL | Arne Naudts (on loan to Deinze) |
| 39 | GK | BEL | Jo Coppens (end of contract) |
| — | DF | BEL | Koenraad Hendrickx (was on loan to Woluwe-Zaventem, now end of contract) |
| — | GK | BEL | Bram Verbist (was on loan to (Denmark) Brøndby, now sold to (Netherlands) Roda JC) |

=== Charleroi ===
In:

| No. | Pos. | Nation | Player |
|---|---|---|---|
| 13 | MF | SEN | Christophe Diandy (on loan from Mons) |
| 19 | MF | BEL | Clinton Mata (from Eupen) |
| 26 | FW | MLI | Kalifa Coulibaly (from (France) PSG Youth Academy) |
| 99 | FW | FRA | Lynel Kitambala (from (France) Saint-Étienne) |
| — | MF | BEL | Karel Geraerts (from OH Leuven) |
| — | GK | FRA | Nicolas Penneteau (from (France) Valenciennes) |

Out:

| No. | Pos. | Nation | Player |
|---|---|---|---|
| 3 | DF | BEL | Mohamed Mrabet (on loan to Virton) |
| 16 | FW | SEN | Jamal Thiaré (on loan to (France) Avranches) |
| 24 | GK | BEL | Salvatore Crimi (loan return to Zulte Waregem) |
| 27 | MF | BRA | Ederson (to (Greece) Asteras Tripolis) |
| — | FW | FRA | Harlem Gnohéré (was on loan to Mouscron-Péruwelz, now sold to Mons) |

=== Club Brugge ===
In:

| No. | Pos. | Nation | Player |
|---|---|---|---|
| 2 | DF | BEL | Davy De fauw (from Zulte Waregem) |
| 6 | MF | BRA | Fernando Menegazzo (from (Saudi Arabia) Al Shabab) |
| 13 | GK | GRE | Sokratis Dioudis (from (Greece) Aris) |
| 14 | FW | CRO | Fran Brodić (from (Croatia) Dinamo Zagreb) |
| 18 | MF | BRA | Felipe Gedoz (from (Uruguay) Defensor) |
| 22 | FW | COL | José Izquierdo (from (Colombia) Once Caldas) |
| 25 | MF | NED | Ruud Vormer (from (Netherlands) Feyenoord) |
| — | MF | CHI | Francisco Silva (on loan from (Spain) Osasuna) |
| — | DF | GRE | Valentinos Vlachos (loan return from (Greece) Aris) |

Out:

| No. | Pos. | Nation | Player |
|---|---|---|---|
| 2 | DF | NOR | Tom Høgli (to (Denmark) Copenhagen) |
| 5 | DF | SWE | Fredrik Stenman (to (Sweden) Djurgårdens IF) |
| 7 | FW | BEL | Mohammed Tchité (contract ended) |
| 10 | DF | DEN | Jesper Jørgensen (to Zulte Waregem) |
| 14 | DF | DEN | Jim Larsen (to (Denmark) Midtjylland) |
| 16 | MF | BEL | Maxime Lestienne (to (Qatar) Al-Arabi) |
| 22 | FW | ISL | Eiður Guðjohnsen (contract ended) |
| 32 | MF | BEL | Vadis Odjidja-Ofoe (to (England) Norwich City) |
| 50 | GK | BEL | Sven Dhoest (on loan to Mouscron-Péruwelz) |
| 55 | FW | BEL | Tuur Dierckx (on loan to Kortrijk) |
| 90 | FW | NGR | Kehinde Fatai (loan return to (Romania) Astra Giurgiu) |
| — | MF | GHA | Enoch Adu (was on loan to (Norway) Stabæk, now sold to (Sweden) Malmö) |
| — | FW | NOR | Mushaga Bakenga (was on loan to (Denmark) Esbjerg, now loaned to (Germany) Eintracht Braunschweig) |
| — | FW | BEL | Adriano Bertaccini (to Genk) |
| — | FW | BEL | Paolino Bertaccini (to Genk) |
| — | MF | BEL | Jimmy De Jonghe (was on loan to Lierse, now loaned to Roeselare) |
| — | MF | GRE | Spyros Fourlanos (was on loan to (Greece) AEL Kalloni, now sold to (Greece) Panionios) |
| — | FW | BEL | Zinho Gano (was on loan to Lommel United, now loaned to Mouscron-Péruwelz) |
| — | DF | SUI | Elton Monteiro (was on loan to (Portugal) Académica de Coimbra, now sold to (Portugal) Braga) |
| — | FW | LAT | Valērijs Šabala (was on loan to (Latvia) Skonto, now loaned to (Cyprus) Anorthosis Famagusta) |
| — | FW | MKD | Ivan Tričkovski (loan return from Waasland-Beveren, then released) |
| — | MF | BEL | Birger Verstraete (on loan to Mouscron-Péruwelz) |

=== Genk ===
In:

| No. | Pos. | Nation | Player |
|---|---|---|---|
| 1 | GK | NED | Marco Bizot (from (Netherlands) Groningen) |
| 11 | MF | BEL | Hervé Kage (from Gent) |
| 14 | FW | GEO | Luka Zarandia (from (Georgia (country)) Lokomotivi Tbilisi) |
| 20 | MF | SRB | Sergej Milinković-Savić (from (Serbia) Vojvodina) |
| 27 | FW | BEL | Christian Kabasele (from Eupen) |
| 49 | MF | GEO | Tornike Okriashvili (from (Ukraine) Shakhtar Donetsk) |
| — | FW | BEL | Adriano Bertaccini (from Club Brugge) |
| — | FW | BEL | Paolino Bertaccini (from Club Brugge) |
| — | MF | SRB | Aleksandar Čavrić (from (Serbia) OFK Beograd) |
| — | MF | BEL | Laurens Vermijl (from Lommel United) |

Out:

| No. | Pos. | Nation | Player |
|---|---|---|---|
| 4 | DF | GER | Torben Joneleit (retired) |
| 5 | MF | FRA | Kalidou Koulibaly (to (Italy) Napoli) |
| 6 | FW | NGR | Kim Ojo (on loan to (Hungary) Újpest) |
| 9 | FW | BEL | Jelle Vossen (on loan to (England) Middlesbrough) |
| 15 | MF | TUN | Fabien Camus (on loan to (France) Evian) |
| 17 | DF | BEL | Jeroen Simaeys (to (Russia) Krylia Sovetov Samara) |
| 22 | GK | BEL | Kristof Van Hout (to (India) Delhi Dynamos) |
| 35 | MF | BEL | Anthony Limbombe (to (Netherlands) NEC) |
| 36 | MF | KEN | Ayub Masika (on loan to Lierse) |
| — | MF | BEL | Alessio Alessandro (on loan to (Netherlands) MVV) |
| — | MF | BEL | Jordy Croux (was on loan to OH Leuven, now loaned to (Netherlands) MVV) |
| — | MF | BEL | Jentl Gaethofs (on loan to Lommel United) |
| — | FW | NGR | Kennedy Nwanganga (was on loan to Westerlo, now loaned to Roeselare) |
| — | DF | BEL | Willem Ofori (on loan to (Netherlands) MVV) |
| — | MF | BEL | Stef Peeters (on loan to (Netherlands) MVV) |
| — | GK | POL | Grzegorz Sandomierski (was on loan to (Croatia) Dinamo Zagreb, now sold to (Poland) Zawisza Bydgoszcz) |
| — | FW | BEL | Leandro Trossard (was on loan to Westerlo, now loaned to Lommel United) |

=== Gent ===
In:

| No. | Pos. | Nation | Player |
|---|---|---|---|
| 5 | MF | FRA | Karim Belhocine (from Waasland-Beveren) |
| 6 | MF | BIH | Nermin Zolotić (from (Bosnia and Herzegovina) Željezničar Sarajevo) |
| 8 | MF | BEL | Mustapha Oussalah (from Kortrijk) |
| 9 | FW | BEL | Laurent Depoitre (from Oostende) |
| 11 | MF | BEL | Benito Raman (loan return from Kortrijk) |
| 14 | MF | BEL | Sven Kums (from Zulte Waregem) |
| 15 | MF | ISR | Kenny Hasan Sayef (from (Israel) Hapoel Nir Ramat HaSharon) |
| 25 | GK | BEL | Brian Vandenbussche (from (Netherlands) Heerenveen) |
| 32 | FW | BEL | Thomas Foket (loan return from Oostende) |
| 55 | DF | ISR | Rami Gershon (from Waasland-Beveren) |
| 99 | FW | BEL | David Pollet (from Anderlecht) |
| — | MF | BEL | Yassine El Ghanassy (loan return from (United Arab Emirates) Al Ain) |
| — | DF | DEN | Lasse Nielsen (on loan from (Netherlands) NEC) |
| — | DF | BRA | Ygor Nogueira (on loan from (Brazil) Fluminense) |

Out:

| No. | Pos. | Nation | Player |
|---|---|---|---|
| 5 | DF | BDI | Valery Nahayo (released) |
| 7 | FW | CAF | Habib Habibou (to (France) Rennes) |
| 8 | MF | BEL | Bernd Thijs (retired) |
| 11 | MF | BEL | Hervé Kage (to Genk) |
| 12 | MF | BEL | Jari Vandeputte (on loan to Roeselare) |
| 15 | DF | CIV | Zié Diabaté (loan return to (France) Dijon) |
| 16 | FW | ZAM | Rodgers Kola (on loan to (Israel) Ironi Kiryat Shmona) |
| 18 | MF | BEL | Rik Impens (on loan to Roeselare) |
| 23 | DF | BIH | Ervin Zukanović (on loan to (Italy) Chievo) |
| 33 | GK | NED | Sergio Padt (to (Netherlands) Groningen) |
| 39 | FW | FRA | Sloan Privat (on loan to (France) SM Caen) |
| — | FW | NED | Tom Boere (was on loan to Hoogstraten, now sold to (Netherlands) FC Eindhoven) |
| — | MF | BEL | Christian Brüls (was on loan to (France) Nice, now sold to (France) Rennes) |
| — | MF | BIH | Armin Čerimagić (was on loan to Eendracht Aalst, now sold to (Poland) Górnik Zabrze) |
| — | MF | BEL | Wouter Corstjens (was on loan to Lierse, now loaned to Waasland-Beveren) |
| — | FW | SEN | Elimane Coulibaly (was on loan to Kortrijk, now sold to Oostende) |
| — | DF | BEL | Nicolas Delporte (to OH Leuven) |
| — | MF | BEL | David Hubert (was on loan to (Israel) Hapoel Be'er Sheva, now loaned to Waasland-Beveren) |
| — | MF | MAR | Zakaria M'Sila (to Waasland-Beveren) |
| — | FW | BEL | Stevy Okitokandjo (to Mechelen) |
| — | DF | BEL | Gilles Ruyssen (to Westerlo) |

=== Kortrijk ===
In:

| No. | Pos. | Nation | Player |
|---|---|---|---|
| 5 | DF | FRA | Alassane També (loan return from Antwerp) |
| 6 | DF | FRA | Benoît Poulain (from (France) Nîmes) |
| 11 | FW | SRB | Adam Marušić (from (Serbia) Voždovac) |
| 26 | GK | BEL | Laurent Henkinet (from Standard Liège) |
| — | FW | BEL | Tuur Dierckx (on loan from Club Brugge) |
| — | MF | BEL | Lukas Van Eenoo (from Cercle Brugge) |
| — | DF | BEL | Anthony Van Loo (from Mechelen) |

Out:

| No. | Pos. | Nation | Player |
|---|---|---|---|
| 3 | DF | FRA | Baptiste Martin (to (France) Clermont Foot) |
| 11 | MF | BEL | Mustapha Oussalah (to Gent) |
| 25 | DF | BEL | Michaël Heylen (loan return to Anderlecht) |
| 27 | MF | BEL | Benito Raman (loan return to Gent) |
| 31 | FW | SEN | Elimane Coulibaly (loan return to Gent) |
| — | GK | BEL | Michaël Clepkens (to (Luxembourg) F91 Dudelange) |
| — | DF | FRA | Romain Reynaud (was on loan to OH Leuven, now released to OH Leuven) |

=== Lierse ===
In:

| No. | Pos. | Nation | Player |
|---|---|---|---|
| 7 | FW | GRE | Apostolos Vellios (from (England) Everton) |
| 11 | FW | GUI | Alhassane Keita (from (France) Metz) |
| 15 | DF | ALG | Rami Bensebaini (on loan from (Algeria) Paradou) |
| 21 | DF | FRA | Florent Hanin (from (Portugal) Braga) |
| 24 | DF | BEL | Ludovic Buysens (from OH Leuven) |
| 28 | FW | CMR | Dorge Kouemaha (from (Turkey) Adana Demirspor) |
| 55 | DF | BEL | Pierre-Yves Ngawa (from Standard Liège) |
| — | MF | POR | Manuel Curto (from (Poland) Zagłębie Lubin) |
| — | MF | KEN | Ayub Masika (on loan from Genk) |
| — | DF | CMR | Éric Matoukou (from (Ukraine) Dnipro Dnipropetrovsk) |

Out:

| No. | Pos. | Nation | Player |
|---|---|---|---|
| 6 | MF | BEL | Julien Vercauteren (to (France) Nice) |
| 10 | DF | BEL | Carl Hoefkens (to Oostende) |
| 13 | MF | BEL | Wouter Corstjens (loan return to Gent) |
| 14 | MF | EGY | Hossam Ghaly (to (Egypt) Al Ahly) |
| 17 | FW | BEL | Lens Annab (to ASV Geel) |
| 26 | FW | SEN | Mbaye Diagne (loan return to (Italy) Juventus) |
| 28 | MF | BEL | Jimmy De Jonghe (loan return to Club Brugge) |
| 29 | FW | BEL | Dolly Menga (to (Portugal) Benfica) |
| 32 | FW | SCO | Tony Watt (loan return to (Scotland) Celtic) |
| — | DF | EGY | Luca Badr (to (Egypt) Al Ahly) |
| — | MF | BEL | Geoffry Hairemans (was on loan to Turnhout, now sold to Heist) |
| — | DF | EST | Enar Jääger (released) |
| — | FW | BEL | Jasper Van Der Heyden (to ASV Geel) |

=== Lokeren ===
In:

| No. | Pos. | Nation | Player |
|---|---|---|---|
| 6 | DF | BRA | Arthur Henrique (from (Bulgaria) Botev Plovdiv) |
| — | FW | MKD | Besart Abdurahimi (from (Croatia) Zagreb) |
| — | FW | BEL | Cyriel Dessers (from OH Leuven) |
| — | MF | ESP | Walter Fernández (loan return from (Romania) Petrolul Ploiești) |
| — | FW | SEN | Mbaye Leye (from Zulte Waregem) |
| — | MF | BEL | Evariste Ngolok (from OH Leuven) |

Out:

| No. | Pos. | Nation | Player |
|---|---|---|---|
| 9 | FW | TUN | Hamdi Harbaoui (to Qatar SC) |
| 22 | FW | SRB | Djordje Despotović (to (Serbia) Red Star Belgrade) |
| — | FW | COD | Cédric Mitu (to Zulte Waregem) |

=== Mechelen ===
In:

| No. | Pos. | Nation | Player |
|---|---|---|---|
| 2 | DF | BEL | Laurens Paulussen (from Westerlo) |
| 7 | MF | BEL | Tim Matthys (from Mons) |
| 9 | FW | SRB | Dalibor Veselinović (from Anderlecht) |
| 16 | FW | BEL | Jason Adesanya (from ASV Geel) |
| 27 | MF | ALG | Sofiane Hanni (from (Turkey) Ankaraspor) |
| 37 | DF | SRB | Ivan Obradović (free agent) |
| 44 | MF | BEL | Ibrahima Cissé (from Standard Liège) |
| — | FW | BEL | Jens Naessens (from Zulte Waregem) |

Out:

| No. | Pos. | Nation | Player |
|---|---|---|---|
| 7 | FW | SEN | Boubacar Dialiba (to (Poland) Cracovia) |
| 9 | FW | DEN | Mads Junker (to (India) Delhi Dynamos) |
| 10 | MF | GHA | Abdul-Yakuni Iddi (on loan to OH Leuven) |
| 14 | FW | BEL | Benjamin Mokulu (on loan to (France) Bastia) |
| 15 | MF | DEN | Thomas Enevoldsen (on loan to (Denmark) AaB) |
| 16 | FW | SWE | Viktor Prodell (on loan to (Sweden) Elfsborg) |
| 17 | FW | BEL | Stevy Okitokandjo (signed from Gent, then loaned to Roeselare) |
| 18 | MF | BEL | David Destorme (on loan to Waasland-Beveren) |
| 21 | DF | BEL | Anthony Van Loo (to Kortrijk) |
| 27 | FW | MKD | Aleksandar Trajkovski (loan return to Zulte Waregem) |
| — | GK | BEL | Thomas De Bie (to Cercle Brugge) |
| — | DF | BEL | Kenny Van Hoevelen (was on loan to (Netherlands) RKC, now sold to OH Leuven) |

=== Mouscron-Péruwelz ===
In:

| No. | Pos. | Nation | Player |
|---|---|---|---|
| 1 | GK | FRA | Pierrick Cros (from (France) Sochaux) |
| 5 | DF | BEL | Pieterjan Monteyne (from Mons) |
| 6 | DF | FRA | Teddy Mézague (from (France) Montpellier) |
| 7 | FW | BEL | Zinho Gano (on loan from Club Brugge) |
| 8 | MF | BEL | Birger Verstraete (on loan from Club Brugge) |
| 9 | FW | FRA | Anice Badri (was on loan from (France) Lille, now signed) |
| 10 | MF | FRA | Julian Michel (was on loan from (France) Lille, now signed) |
| 15 | DF | FRA | Julian Jeanvier (on loan from (France) Lille) |
| 18 | FW | GUF | Roy Contout (from (France) Sochaux-Montbéliard) |
| 19 | DF | FRA | Tristan Dingomé (from (France) Monaco) |
| 23 | FW | MLI | Abdoulay Diaby (again on loan from (France) Lille) |
| 27 | MF | FRA | Sébastien Pennacchio (again on loan from (France) Lille) |
| 30 | MF | FRA | Steeven Langil (from (France) Guingamp) |
| 31 | DF | FRA | Nolan Mbemba (on loan from (France) Lille) |
| — | GK | BEL | Sven Dhoest (on loan from Club Brugge) |
| — | FW | FRA | Nicolas Perez (again on loan from (France) Lille) |
| — | DF | FRA | Thibault Peyre (again on loan from (France) Lille) |

Out:

| No. | Pos. | Nation | Player |
|---|---|---|---|
| 7 | DF | BEL | Jérémy Huyghebaert (to WS Bruxelles) |
| 12 | MF | BEL | Vincent Provoost (to Roeselare) |
| 16 | DF | BEL | Yohan Brouckaert (to OH Leuven) |
| — | FW | FRA | Harlem Gnohéré (loan return to Charleroi) |
| — | GK | FRA | Alexandre Oukidja (loan return to (France) Lille) |

=== Oostende ===
In:

| No. | Pos. | Nation | Player |
|---|---|---|---|
| 1 | GK | FRA | Jean Chopin (from (France) Lens) |
| 9 | FW | BEL | Bjorn Ruytinx (from OH Leuven) |
| 16 | FW | SEN | Elimane Coulibaly (from Gent) |
| 19 | DF | BEL | Carl Hoefkens (from Lierse) |
| 25 | FW | BRA | Fernando Canesin (was on loan from Anderlecht, now bought) |
| 26 | DF | BEL | Jordan Lukaku (was on loan from Anderlecht, now bought) |
| 27 | MF | FRA | Franck Berrier (was on loan from Zulte Waregem, now bought) |
| 29 | FW | CRC | John Jairo Ruiz (on loan from (France) Lille) |
| — | FW | CRO | Ante Blažević (from (Croatia) Hajduk Split Reserves) |

Out:

| No. | Pos. | Nation | Player |
|---|---|---|---|
| 9 | FW | BEL | Laurent Depoitre (to Gent) |
| 11 | FW | BEL | Thomas Foket (loan return to Gent) |
| 19 | MF | BEL | Denis Dessaer (to Woluwe-Zaventem) |
| 21 | DF | BEL | Gertjan Martens (on loan to Antwerp) |
| 23 | FW | ZIM | Nyasha Mushekwi (loan return to (South Africa) Mamelodi Sundowns) |
| 29 | MF | SVK | Peter Sládek (loan return to (Slovakia) Spartak Myjava) |
| — | DF | BEL | Georgios Kaminiaris (to Mons) |
| — | GK | COD | Mulopo Kudimbana (was on loan to Anderlecht, now sold) |
| — | MF | ESP | Fede Vico (loan return to Anderlecht) |

=== Standard Liège ===
In:

| No. | Pos. | Nation | Player |
|---|---|---|---|
| 4 | MF | SEN | Ricardo Faty (from (France) Ajaccio) |
| 5 | DF | POR | Jorge Teixeira (from (Switzerland) Zürich) |
| 11 | MF | ESP | Jonathan Viera (from (Spain) Valencia) |
| 19 | DF | FRA | Damien Dussaut (from (France) Valenciennes) |
| 23 | MF | FRA | Adrien Trebel (from (France) Nantes) |
| 25 | MF | HAI | Jeff Louis (from (France) Nancy) |
| 27 | DF | COL | Darwin Andrade (on loan from (Hungary) Újpest) |
| 32 | FW | SCO | Tony Watt (from (Scotland) Celtic) |
| 66 | DF | SLO | Martin Milec (from (Slovenia) Maribor) |
| 67 | MF | BEL | Tortol Lumanza (loan return from Sint-Truiden) |
| — | FW | BRA | Vinícius Araújo (from (Spain) Valencia) |
| — | MF | CMR | Eyong Enoh (from (Turkey) Antalyaspor) |

Out:

| No. | Pos. | Nation | Player |
|---|---|---|---|
| 11 | MF | GAB | Frédéric Bulot (on loan to (England) Charlton Athletic) |
| 16 | MF | BEL | Yoni Buyens (on loan to (England) Charlton Athletic) |
| 21 | MF | FRA | William Vainqueur (to (Russia) Dynamo Moscow) |
| 23 | FW | BEL | Michy Batshuayi (to (France) Marseille) |
| 25 | DF | BRA | Kanu (contract terminated) |
| 26 | DF | ISR | Tal Ben Haim (to (England) Charlton Athletic) |
| 39 | FW | NGR | Imoh Ezekiel (to (Qatar) Al-Arabi) |
| 44 | DF | BEL | Ibrahima Cissé (to Mechelen) |
| 52 | FW | BEL | Yannis Mbombo (on loan to (France) Auxerre) |
| — | MF | ISR | Dudu Biton (was on loan to (Spain) Alcorcón, now loaned to (Slovenia) Maribor) |
| — | GK | BEL | Laurent Henkinet (was on loan to Dessel Sport, now sold to Kortrijk) |
| — | MF | TUR | Anıl Koç (was on loan to (England) Charlton Athletic, now loaned to Sint-Truiden) |
| — | DF | BEL | Simon Ligot (on loan to Visé) |
| — | GK | LUX | Anthony Moris (was on loan to Sint-Truiden, now released) |
| — | DF | BEL | Pierre-Yves Ngawa (was on loan to (Hungary) Újpest, now sold to Lierse) |
| — | MF | TUR | Alpaslan Öztürk (again on loan to (Turkey) Kasımpaşa) |
| — | FW | ROU | George Țucudean (was on loan to (Romania) Dinamo București, now sold to (England) Charlton Athletic) |
| — | FW | NED | Danny Verbeek (was on loan to (Netherlands) NAC Breda, now loaned to (Netherlands) Utrecht) |
| — | DF | ALB | Mërgim Vojvoda (on loan to Sint-Truiden) |

=== Waasland-Beveren ===
In:

| No. | Pos. | Nation | Player |
|---|---|---|---|
| 1 | GK | BEL | Benny Rogiest (from RWDM Brussels) |
| 2 | MF | BEL | Wouter Corstjens (on loan from Gent) |
| 4 | DF | BRA | Robson (from OH Leuven) |
| 6 | MF | BEL | David Hubert (on loan from Gent) |
| 7 | DF | GHA | David Addy (from (Portugal) Vitória Guimarães) |
| 9 | FW | CRO | Ante Vukušić (on loan from (Italy) Pescara) |
| 12 | FW | GAM | Ibou (from OH Leuven) |
| 17 | MF | BEL | David Destorme (on loan from Mechelen) |
| 33 | DF | IDN | Arthur Irawan (from (Spain) Atlético Malagueño) |
| 55 | MF | MAR | Zakaria M'Sila (from Gent) |
| 77 | MF | BEL | Daimy Deflem (from Woluwe-Zaventem) |
| — | FW | GBS | Amido Baldé (on loan from (Scotland) Celtic) |

Out:

| No. | Pos. | Nation | Player |
|---|---|---|---|
| 4 | DF | MLI | Kassim Doumbia (to (Iceland) Hafnarfjarðar) |
| 6 | MF | FRA | Karim Belhocine (to Gent) |
| 7 | FW | MKD | Ivan Tričkovski (loan return to Club Brugge) |
| 9 | FW | SRB | Dalibor Veselinović (loan return to Anderlecht) |
| 13 | DF | NED | Bas Sibum (contract ended) |
| 55 | DF | ISR | Rami Gershon (to Gent) |
| — | MF | FRA | Mikael Seoudi (was on loan to RWDM Brussels, now released to Roeselare) |

=== Westerlo ===
In:

| No. | Pos. | Nation | Player |
|---|---|---|---|
| 2 | DF | NED | Mitch Apau (from (Netherlands) RKC) |
| 5 | DF | BEL | Bruno Godeau (from Zulte Waregem) |
| 10 | MF | NED | Evander Sno (from (Netherlands) RKC) |
| 12 | FW | BEN | Frédéric Gounongbe (from RWDM Brussels) |
| 14 | FW | BEL | Mohammed Aoulad (from Sint-Truiden) |
| 15 | DF | GER | Christian Dorda (from (Netherlands) Utrecht) |
| 18 | MF | BEL | Nils Schouterden (from Eupen) |
| 19 | MF | BEL | Arno Verschueren (from OH Leuven) |
| 22 | DF | BEL | Gilles Ruyssen (to Westerlo) Gent |

Out:

| No. | Pos. | Nation | Player |
|---|---|---|---|
| 7 | FW | BEL | Leandro Trossard (loan return to Genk) |
| 8 | MF | BEL | Laurens Paulussen (to Mechelen) |
| 11 | FW | COL | Jaime Alfonso Ruiz (to Heist) |
| 14 | MF | BEL | Philippe Janssens (to Aalst) |
| 16 | FW | NGR | Kennedy Nwanganga (loan return to Genk) |
| 20 | DF | BEL | Matthias Trenson (to OH Leuven) |
| — | DF | BEL | Jeffrey Rentmeister (to (England) Blackpool) |

=== Zulte Waregem ===
In:

| No. | Pos. | Nation | Player |
|---|---|---|---|
| 2 | DF | FRA | Yarouba Cissako (on loan from (France) Monaco) |
| 6 | DF | POR | Tiago Ferreira (from (Portugal) Porto B) |
| 9 | FW | NED | Glynor Plet (from (Israel) Hapoel Be'er Sheva) |
| 12 | FW | MKD | Aleksandar Trajkovski (loan return from Mechelen) |
| 15 | FW | BEL | Jonathan Benteke (from Visé) |
| 18 | MF | BEL | Kylian Hazard (from WS Bruxelles) |
| 23 | DF | TUR | Sefa Isçi (from Anderlecht) |
| 26 | MF | ENG | Chuks Aneke (from (England) Arsenal) |
| 28 | DF | GUI | Djibril Paye (from (Moldova) Sheriff Tiraspol) |
| 43 | MF | BEL | Charni Ekangamene (from (England) Manchester United) |
| 50 | GK | BEL | Salvatore Crimi (loan return from Charleroi) |
| — | DF | DEN | Jesper Jørgensen (from Club Brugge) |
| — | DF | FRA | Jérémy Labor (from (France) Monaco) |
| — | MF | BEL | Mohamed Messoudi (from OH Leuven) |
| — | FW | COD | Cédric Mitu (from Lokeren) |
| — | MF | CMR | Willie Overtoom (from (Netherlands) AZ) |
| — | MF | BEL | Tom Rosenthal (from (England) Watford) |
| — | MF | AUS | James Troisi (from (Italy) Juventus) |

Out:

| No. | Pos. | Nation | Player |
|---|---|---|---|
| 2 | DF | BEL | Davy De fauw (to Club Brugge) |
| 7 | FW | CMR | Fabrice Olinga (loan return to (Spain) Málaga) |
| 8 | MF | BEL | Sven Kums (to Gent) |
| 10 | MF | BEL | Thorgan Hazard (loan return to (England) Chelsea) |
| 12 | FW | GER | Marvin Pourié (loan return to (Denmark) Copenhagen) |
| 14 | FW | SEN | Mbaye Leye (to Lokeren) |
| 17 | MF | GUI | Ibrahima Conté (to Anderlecht) |
| 21 | DF | BEL | Bruno Godeau (to Westerlo) |
| 23 | MF | BEL | Mehdi Tarfi (loan return to Anderlecht) |
| 26 | FW | BEL | Jens Naessens (to Mechelen) |
| 33 | MF | CIV | Bobley Anderson (loan return to (Spain) Málaga) |
| 43 | DF | PAN | Roberto Chen (loan return to (Spain) Málaga) |
| — | MF | FRA | Franck Berrier (was on loan to Oostende, now sold) |
