= Pierrick Cros =

Pierrick Cros may refer to:

- Pierrick Cros (footballer, born 1991), French football goalkeeper
- Pierrick Cros (footballer, born 1992), French football defender
