= Oussalah =

Oussalah is a surname. Notable people with the surname include:

- Mustapha Oussalah (born 1982), Belgian-Moroccan footballer
- Nassim Oussalah (born 1981), Algerian footballer
