= David Pollet =

Belgian footballer (born 1988)

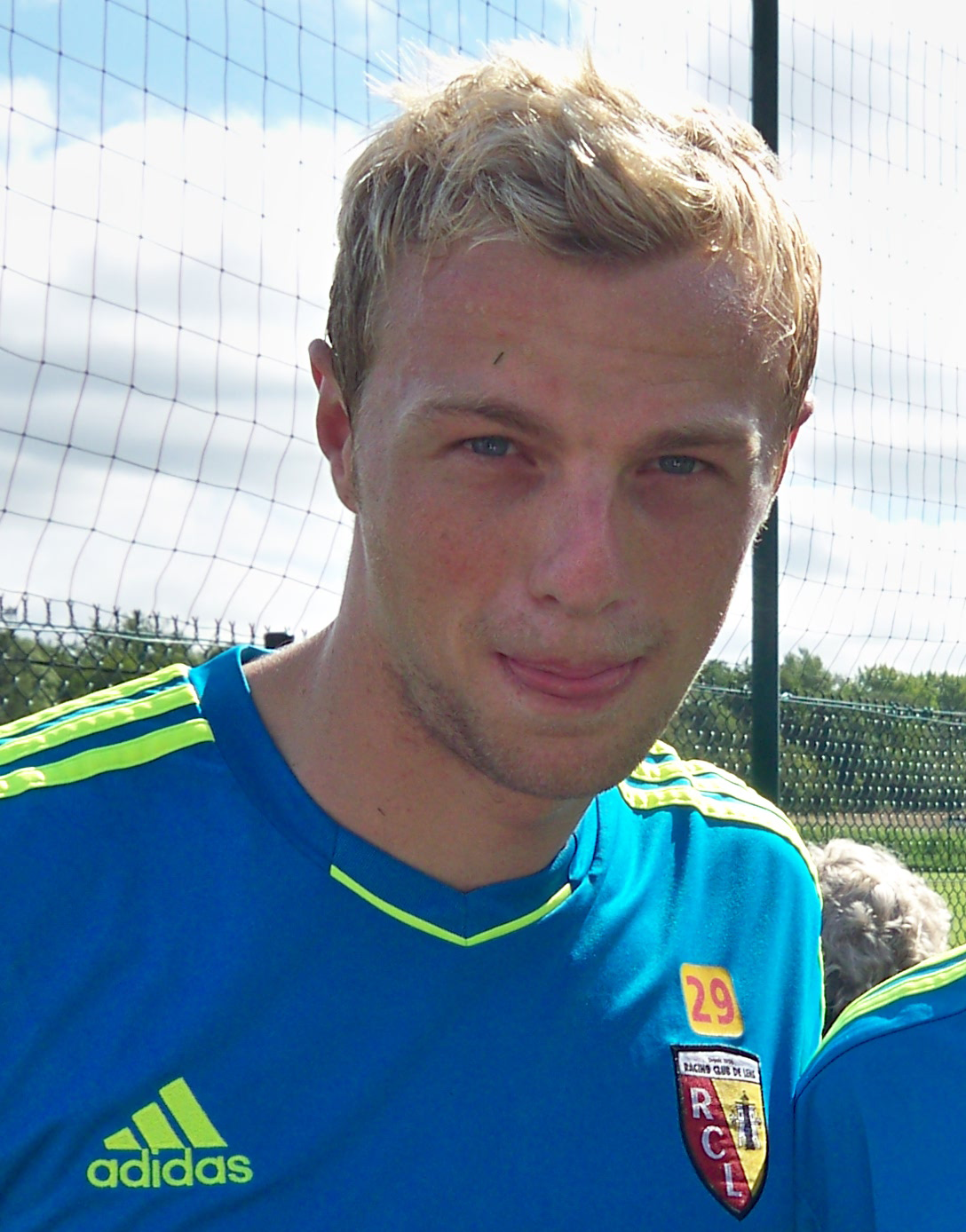

Personal information
- Date of birth: 12 August 1988 (age 38)
- Place of birth: La Bassée, France
- Height: 1.88 m (6 ft 2 in)
- Position: Forward

Team information
- Current team: Wasquehal
- Number: 9

Senior career*
Years	Team	Apps	(Gls)
2006–2013	Lens	73	(16)
2008	→ Reims (loan)	6	(0)
2009	→ Gueugnon (loan)	18	(5)
2009–2010	→ Paris FC (loan)	35	(22)
2013–2014	Charleroi	30	(16)
2014	Anderlecht	6	(2)
2014–2015	Gent	18	(2)
2015–2019	Charleroi	66	(11)
2018–2019	→ Eupen (loan)	19	(0)
2019–2021	Gazélec Ajaccio	25	(13)
2021–2023	Avranches	44	(11)
2021–2023	Avranches II	4	(2)
2023–	Wasquehal	8	(4)

International career
2005–2006	Belgium U18	9	(2)
2006–2007	Belgium U19	6	(7)
2007	Belgium U20	1	(0)
2007	Belgium U21	3	(0)
- * Club domestic league appearances and goals as of 25 November 2023

David Pollet (born 12 August 1988) is a Belgian professional footballer who plays as a forward for French fourth-tier Championnat National 1 club Wasquehal. He also holds French citizenship.

== Career ==
In 2008, Pollet played on loan at Stade de Reims from RC Lens.

On 15 January 2013 it was announced by his club Lens that Pollet has signed for Belgian club Charleroi on a free transfer with a further 30% of any future transfer fee going to Lens. He signed a 2.5-year contract and was handed the number 10 shirt, previously worn by the departing Hervé Kage.

On 12 August 2019, he signed with French club GFC Ajaccio.

== Career statistics ==
=== Club ===
As of match played 21 June 2019

Appearances and goals by club, season and competition
Club	Season	League			National Cup		League Cup		Continental		Other		Total	
Club	Season	Division	Apps	Goals	Apps	Goals	Apps	Goals	Apps	Goals	Apps	Goals	Apps	Goals
Lens	2007–08	Ligue 1	1	0	0	0	0	0	–		–		1	0
Lens	2008–09	Ligue 1	0	0	0	0	0	0	–		–		0	0
Lens	2009–10	Ligue 1	0	0	0	0	0	0	–		–		0	0
Lens	2010–11	Ligue 1	16	1	0	0	1	0	–		–		17	1
Lens	2011–12	Ligue 2	38	11	0	0	2	1	–		–		40	12
Lens	2012–13	Ligue 2	18	4	1	0	1	0	–		–		20	4
Lens	Total		73	16	1	0	4	1	0	0	0	0	78	17
Reims	2008–09	Ligue 2	6	0	0	0	1	0	–		–		7	0
Gueugnon (loan)	2008–09	National	18	5	0	0	–		–		–		18	5
Paris FC (loan)	2009–10	National	35	22	0	0	–		–		–		35	22
Lens II	2010–11	CFA	9	4	–		–		–		–		9	4
Lens II	2011–12	CFA	1	0	–		–		–		–		1	0
Lens II	Total		10	4	0	0	0	0	0	0	0	0	10	4
Charleroi	2012–13	Pro League	8	5	0	0	–		0	0	6	1	14	6
Charleroi	2013–14	Pro League	22	11	1	0	–		0	0	0	0	23	11
Charleroi	Total		30	16	1	0	0	0	0	0	6	1	37	17
Anderlecht	2013–14	Pro League	6	2	0	0	–		0	0	6	0	12	2
Gent	2014–15	Pro League	18	2	1	0	–		0	0	3	0	22	2
Charleroi	2015–16	Pro League	26	3	1	1	–		4	2	8	0	39	6
Charleroi	2016–17	Belgian First Division A	23	6	2	0	–		0	0	9	2	34	8
Charleroi	2017–18	Belgian First Division A	17	2	0	0	–		0	0	5	1	22	3
Charleroi	Total		66	11	3	1	0	0	4	2	22	3	95	17
Eupen (loan)	2018–19	Belgian First Division A	19	0	2	0	–		–		0	0	21	0
Charleroi total			96	27	4	1	0	0	4	2	28	4	132	34
Career total			281	78	8	1	5	1	4	2	37	4	335	86

== Honours ==
Lens

- Coupe de la Ligue: runner-up 2008

Anderlecht

- Belgian Pro League: 2014

Gent

- Belgian Pro League: 2015
