= Marcos Angeleri =

Argentine footballer

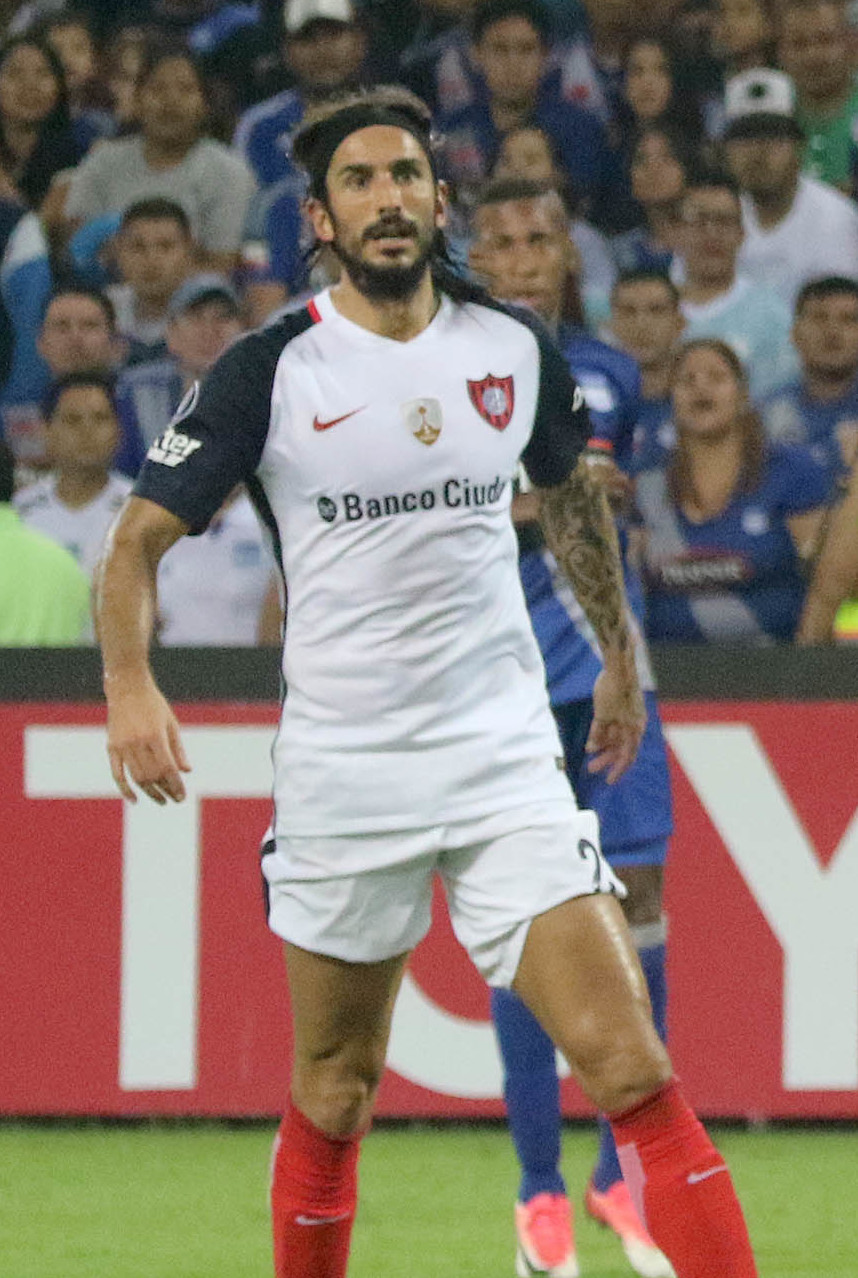

Personal information
- Full name: Marcos Alberto Angeleri
- Date of birth: 7 April 1983 (age 43)
- Place of birth: La Plata, Argentina
- Height: 1.80 m (5 ft 11 in)
- Position: Centre-back

Youth career
- Estudiantes

Senior career*
Years	Team	Apps	(Gls)
2002–2010	Estudiantes	184	(2)
2010–2012	Sunderland	2	(0)
2012–2013	Estudiantes	23	(0)
2013–2016	Málaga	61	(0)
2016–2018	San Lorenzo	48	(1)
2018–2019	Nacional	13	(0)
2019–2020	Argentinos Juniors	8	(0)

International career
2009–2011	Argentina	4	(0)
- * Club domestic league appearances and goals

Marcos Alberto Angeleri (born 7 April 1983) is an Argentine former footballer who played as a centre-back.

== Career ==
=== Estudiantes ===
Born in La Plata, Buenos Aires Province, Angeleri made his first appearance for Estudiantes in 2002. He played in the championship decider for the Apertura 2006 title, and in 2008 was called by Diego Maradona to the Argentina national football team.

Angeleri is mostly deployed as a wingback on the right, where he is noted for his aggressive defense and solid transition play along the right flank. Under coach Diego Simeone he also played as a libero. His freedom to join the attack was increased after the arrival of Leonardo Astrada as coach in mid-2008, causing Angeleri to be noticed by Maradona and by South American sports journalists, who voted Angeleri in a top-ten place in the 2008 edition of the South American Footballer of the Year award.

In 2008 Angeleri was part of the Estudiantes team that finished as runners up in the Copa Sudamericana 2008, and then was a regular player in the team that won the Copa Libertadores 2009, although he missed the latter stages of the tournament through an injury, which also frustrated a transfer to Europe, where several top sides were interested in him. Having fully recovered, Angeleri played in the 2010 Clausura tournament and the 2010 Copa Libertadores.

Angeleri's nicknames have been a matter of some good-natured controversy. Former Estudiantes coach Carlos Bilardo, who is noted for his superstitions, argued that "Mambrú" was a poor choice ("Mambrú" is the subject of a children's song that relates how the Duke of Marlborough died fighting a war). "Comandante" was proposed (referring to Subcomandante Marcos), as well as "Cacique" (chief). Angeleri revealed that his childhood nickname was "Cascarita" (egg shell); other nicknames bestowed upon him are "Gordo" (fat guy) and "Cobra" (for his aggressive defending).

=== Sunderland ===
Angeleri signed for Sunderland in the Premier League for an undisclosed fee believed to be in the region of £1.5 million on a three-year contract on 24 July 2010, after training with Sunderland. Weeks later, reports claimed that Angeleri was unsettled in England, a report denied by Steve Bruce Eventually, He was included in Sunderland's 25-man squad for the 2010–11 season. In late November, reports claims Angeleri was linked with a move to a French Giant Marseille. He made his debut on 26 December 2010 against Manchester United as a late replacement for Bolo Zenden in a 2–0 defeat. He made his first start for Sunderland in a FA Cup match against Notts County on 8 January 2011. With few appearance, his time in England was forgettable, having failed to make an impact and even worse his first team opportunities were limited. In March, Angeleri was selected for the Argentina national team despite having played only three matches during the season. Shortly after, Angeleri was in a row with Bruce after accusing Bruce of avoiding him and told ESPN Radio "The boss doesn't talk to me, he doesn't even say hello to me when he sees me, I think he doesn't like me because I'm not English. Steve Bruce is not a nice person at all. He is a little unpleasant. I have played just a few minutes in Sunderland since my arrival. I want to play, that's my job. That's why I'm not happy here in Sunderland. I don't understand why I'm not playing. The boss is too defensive." In Bruce's response, he will sort out with Angeleri, having upset Bruce.

In May 2011, Angeleri returned to Argentina to see a knee specialist about an injury problem picked up during the pre-season game between Sunderland and Benfica in Portugal. The following month, Angeleri was given an all clear, following surgery on his knee However three months on, Angeleri suffered a knee injury, resulting an undergoing a knee operation but this in England, rather than his homeland In February 2012, Angeleri had a second knee operation, having to continue recovering his injury.

In June 2012, his agent says he hopes his return to Argentina, with Sunderland keen to let him go Several clubs in South America want to sign him, with the likes of Independiente, San Lorenzo and two unknown South American clubs.

=== Return to Estudiantes ===
After spending two unsuccessful years at Sunderland, Angeleri rejoined Estudiantes on 20 July 2012. Estudiantes were keen on signing him back already in 2011, but nothing came out of it.

=== Málaga ===
On 24 July 2013, it was announced that Spanish La Liga club Málaga CF had signed Angeleri on a three-year contract, with the transfer fee of €230,000 He featured regularly for the Andalusians in his debut campaign, appearing in 26 matches (2,228 minutes of action).

=== San Lorenzo ===
On 30 January 2016, he returned to Argentina to play in San Lorenzo de Almagro transferring as a free agent on a two-year contract. On 13 May 2017, he scored his first goal as a San Lorenzo player in the derby against Huracán de Tres Arroyos.

=== Nacional ===
He transferred to Club Nacional de Football on 20 July 2018 after not having much play time in his last season.

== Honours ==
Estudiantes

- Argentine Primera División: 2006 Apertura
- Copa Libertadores: 2009

San Lorenzo

- Supercopa Argentina: 2015
