= Sefa İşçi =

Turkish footballer

Personal information
- Date of birth: 26 March 1996 (age 30)
- Place of birth: Ghent, Belgium
- Height: 1.82 m (6 ft 0 in)
- Position: Right back

Youth career
- 2002–2004: WS SC Sint-Amandsberg
- 2004–2012: Gent
- 2012–2014: Anderlecht

Senior career*
Years	Team	Apps	(Gls)
2014–2016	Zulte-Waregem	1	(0)
2016	Fatih Karagümrük	7	(0)

International career
2011	Belgium U15	8	(0)
2011–2012	Belgium U16	8	(0)
2012–2013	Belgium U17	14	(2)
2013	Belgium U18	1	(0)
2014–2015	Turkey U19	10	(0)
- * Club domestic league appearances and goals as of 28 December 2016 (UTC)

Sefa İşçi (born 26 March 1996) is a Turkish footballer who last played for Fatih Karagümrük as a right back.

== Career ==
In July 2014 he joined S.V. Zulte Waregem, coming from R.S.C. Anderlecht's youth academy. He made his first team debut at 31 July 2014 in the UEFA Europa League qualifying round against Shakhtyor Soligorsk.
