= Stef Peeters =

Belgian footballer (born 1992)

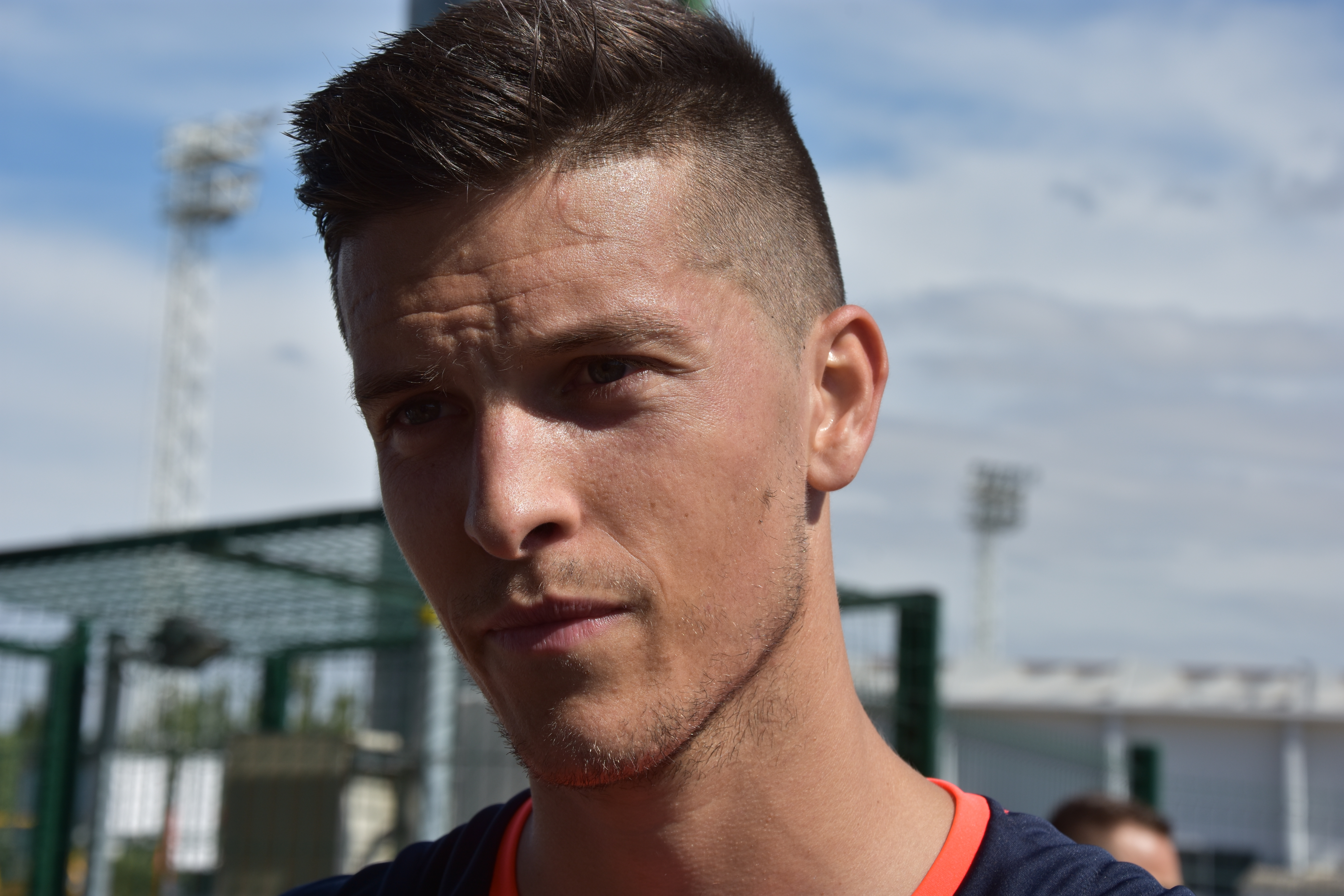
- Peeters in 2017

Personal information
- Date of birth: 9 February 1992 (age 34)
- Place of birth: Meeuwen-Gruitrode, Belgium
- Height: 1.88 m (6 ft 2 in)
- Position: Midfielder

Team information
- Current team: Patro Eisden
- Number: 8

Youth career
- 1998–1999: Sporting Nevok Gruitrode
- 1999–2011: Genk

Senior career*
| Years | Team | Apps | (Gls) |
| 2011–2015 | Genk | 5 | (0) |
| 2013–2014 | → Sparta Rotterdam (loan) | 27 | (2) |
| 2014–2015 | → MVV (loan) | 33 | (7) |
| 2015–2016 | MVV | 35 | (10) |
| 2016–2017 | Sint-Truiden | 37 | (5) |
| 2017–2019 | Caen | 27 | (0) |
| 2019 | → Zulte Waregem (loan) | 14 | (1) |
| 2019–2020 | Cercle Brugge | 24 | (6) |
| 2020–2023 | Eupen | 94 | (12) |
| 2023– | Patro Eisden | 57 | (5) |
- * Club domestic league appearances and goals as of 20 April 2026

Stef Peeters (born 9 February 1992) is a Belgian professional footballer who plays as a midfielder for Challenger Pro League club Patro Eisden. He formerly played for Genk, Sparta Rotterdam, MVV, Sint-Truiden, Cercle Brugge and Eupen.

== Career ==
=== Genk ===
Born in Meeuwen-Gruitrode, Peeters is a Genk youth exponent, joining them from childhood club Sporting Nevok Gruitrode as a seven-year-old. He made his professional debut for Genk under head coach Mario Been on 19 November 2011, replacing Dániel Tőzsér in the 83rd minute of a 3–0 league win over Westerlo. He signed his first contract three days later, on 22 November, keeping him at Genk until 2013.

On 1 January 2013, Peeters was sent on a one-and-a-half-season loan to Sparta Rotterdam, after extending his contract with Genk until 2015. He made his debut for Sparta as a starter on 3 February 2013 in a 1–0 victory against Cambuur in the Eerste Divisie. Peeters scored his first professional goal exactly one year later, on 3 February 2014, opening the score in Sparta's 2–1 away win over Jong PSV.

=== MVV ===
Ahead of the 2014–15 season, Peeters was sent on loan to Eerste Divisie club MVV alongside fellow Genk players Jordy Croux, Willem Ofori-Appiah and Alessio Alessandro as part of the two clubs' cooperation agreement. He made his debut for the club on 8 August 2014 in a 5–0 loss away to Almere City in a game where MVV started seven Belgians. On 25 August he scored his first goal for MVV on a penalty-kick in an away win over Jong Twente.

Peeters signed a permanent deal with MVV on 23 June 2015, a one-year contract with an option for an additional season.

=== Sint-Truiden ===
In summer 2016, Peeters joined Belgian Pro League side Sint-Truiden from MVV on a two-year deal. During the 2016–17 season he amassed 13 assists and five goals in 39 matches.

=== Caen ===
On 22 June 2017, French Ligue 1 Caen announced that they had reached an agreement for the transfer of Peeters on a three-year contract, for a reported fee of €1.5 million.

He made his debut for Caen on 5 August 2017, the opening matchday of the 2017–18 season, replacing Durel Avounou in the 70th minute of a 1–0 away loss to Montpellier. He would mostly remain a substitute during the first half of the season, only making his first league start on 20 December, playing 71 minutes before being subbed off in a 3–1 loss to Paris Saint-Germain. In the second half of the season he became a starter for the club, finishing with a total of 25 appearances for Caen, who managed to avoid relegation.

=== Eupen ===
On 7 July 2020, Peeters moved to Eupen. On 10 August, he made his debut for the club in a league game against Oud-Heverlee Leuven. He scored his first goal for the Pandas on 21 November 2020, giving his team the lead in the 57th minute of an eventual 2–2 away draw against Standard Liège.

=== Patro Eisden ===
On 1 September 2023, Challenger Pro League club, Patro Eisden, made a remarkably unexpected move by signing Peeters as a free agent. He signed a four-year contract with the club, recently promoted from the third-tier Belgian National Division 1, and managed by former Belgian international Stijn Stijnen. Peeters made his debut for the club in the Belgian Cup, starting in a 2–0 victory against Hoogstraten on 9 September. One week later, he made his debut for Klein Anderlecht in the Challenger Pro League, contributing to a 3–1 away victory against the real Anderlecht's reserves, the RSCA Futures. He provided an assist for Stefán Ingi Sigurðarson's goal in the 54th minute.
