= Paolino Bertaccini =

Belgian footballer

Personal information
- Date of birth: 19 November 1997 (age 28)
- Place of birth: Charleroi, Belgium
- Height: 1.65 m (5 ft 5 in)
- Positions: Winger; attacking midfielder

Team information
- Current team: UR Namur
- Number: 7

Youth career
- Charleroi
- Standard Liège
- –2014: Club Brugge
- 2014–2015: Genk

Senior career*
Years	Team	Apps	(Gls)
2015–2017	Genk	2	(0)
2016–2017	→ Cercle Brugge (loan)	22	(1)
2017–2019	Arouca	16	(0)
2019–2020	Deinze	0	(0)
2020	→ Wacker Innsbruck II (loan)	0	(0)
2020–2021	Wacker Innsbruck II	27	(15)
2021–2022	Wacker Innsbruck	16	(1)
2022–2025	Floridsdorfer AC	82	(11)
2025–	UR Namur	31	(8)

International career
2012	Belgium U15	4	(1)
2012–2013	Belgium U16	11	(2)
2013–2014	Belgium U17	15	(3)
2014	Belgium U18	3	(2)
2014–2015	Belgium U19	4	(0)
- * Club domestic league appearances and goals as of 28 June 2026

Paolino Bertaccini (born 19 November 1997) is a Belgian professional footballer who plays as a winger for UR Namur.

== Career ==
Born in Charleroi, Bertaccini played with Charleroi, Standard Liège, Club Brugge and Genk as a junior. He made his Belgian Pro League debut with K.R.C. Genk on 18 January 2015 against Lokeren.

His younger brother Adriano Bertaccini is also a professional footballer who plays for R.S.C. Anderlecht since the summer of 2025.

== Personal life ==
Born in Belgium, Bertaccini is of Italian descent.
