= Daimy Deflem =

Belgian footballer

Personal information
- Date of birth: 4 May 1994 (age 32)
- Place of birth: Tienen, Belgium
- Height: 1.78 m (5 ft 10 in)
- Position: Forward

Team information
- Current team: Diegem Sport
- Number: 10

Youth career
- –2011: Tienen

Senior career*
Years	Team	Apps	(Gls)
2011–2013	Tienen	38	(2)
2013–2014	Woluwe-Zaventem	30	(3)
2014–2015	Waasland-Beveren	5	(0)
2015–2016	Tempo Overijse	27	(8)
2016–2017	Heist	22	(1)
2017–2018	Londerzeel		
2018–2019	Tempo Overijse	20	(4)
2019–2020	Tienen	17	(1)
2020–2021	Diest		
2021–	Diegem Sport	149	(81)

International career
2009	Belgium U15	2	(0)
2009	Belgium U16	1	(0)
- * Club domestic league appearances and goals as of 3 May 2026

Daimy Deflem (born 4 May 1994) is a Belgian professional footballer who plays as a forward for Diegem Sport.

== Club career ==
Deflem signed a two-year contract with Waasland-Beveren in May 2014, coming from Woluwe-Zaventem. He made his top flight debut at 26 July 2014 against Club Brugge in a 0–2 home defeat. He replaced Hrvoje Čale after 75 minutes.
