= Karim Tarfi =

Belgian footballer

Personal information
- Full name: Karim Tarfi
- Date of birth: 5 July 1993 (age 33)
- Place of birth: Jette, Belgium
- Height: 1.75 m (5 ft 9 in)
- Position: Midfielder

Youth career
- ?–2012: Anderlecht

Senior career*
Years	Team	Apps	(Gls)
2012–2014	Anderlecht	0	(0)
2012–2013	→ De Graafschap (loan)	6	(2)
2014–2016	De Graafschap	55	(9)

International career
2008	Belgium U15	1	(0)
2008–2009	Belgium U16	3	(0)
2010	Belgium U17	5	(0)
2010–2011	Belgium U18	4	(1)
2011	Belgium U19	1	(0)
2012	Belgium U20	1	(0)
- * Club domestic league appearances and goals as of 21 May 2016

Karim Tarfi (born 5 July 1993 in Jette) is a Belgian professional footballer who plays as a midfielder. He formerly played for Anderlecht and De Graafschap.
