= Jasper Van Der Heyden =

Belgian footballer (born 1995)

Van Der Heyden
Personal information
- Full name: Van Der Heyden Jasper
- Date of birth: 3 July 1995 (age 31)
- Place of birth: Belgium
- Height: 1.80 m (5 ft 11 in)
- Position: Winger

Team information
- Current team: 07 Vestur
- Number: 7

Youth career
- 2004–2013: Lierse

Senior career*
Years	Team	Apps	(Gls)
2013–2014	Lierse	4	(0)
2014–2015	ASV Geel	27	(3)
2015–2016	Hoogstraten VV	6	(2)
2016–2017	ASV Geel	32	(2)
2017–2018	Zwarte Leeuw		
2018–2019	Þróttur	42	(10)
2020	AB Argir	23	(2)
2021	KÍ Klaksvík	14	(6)
2022–2023	07 Vestur	52	(15)
2024–2025	NSÍ Runavík	47	(8)
2026–	07 Vestur	25	(4)

International career
2013	Belgium U18	5	(1)
- * Club domestic league appearances and goals as of 1 November 2026

Jasper Van Der Heyden (born 3 July 1995) is a Belgian professional footballer who plays for 07 Vestur in the Faroe Islands. He is a fast winger that uses both feet and is the son of Stephan Van Der Heyden.

== Career ==
He made his top flight debut with Lierse at age 17 during the 2012–13 season. From 2018 to 2019 he played for the Icelandic club Þróttur. In 2020 he played for the Faroese club AB Argir and the following season in January 2021 he signed a one-year contract with Faroese champions from the 2019 season KÍ Klaksvík.

== Honours ==
KÍ

- Faroe Islands Premier League: 2021
