= Gilles Ruyssen =

Belgian footballer

Personal information
- Date of birth: 18 June 1994 (age 32)
- Place of birth: Belgium
- Height: 1.86 m (6 ft 1 in)
- Position: Center back

Team information
- Current team: Kortrijk
- Number: 22

Youth career
- 1999–2006: Ronse
- 2006–2014: Gent

Senior career*
| Years | Team | Apps | (Gls) |
| 2013–2014 | Gent | 1 | (0) |
| 2014–2017 | Westerlo | 32 | (1) |
| 2017–2018 | Lommel United | 32 | (4) |
| 2018–2023 | RWDM47 | 105 | (9) |
| 2023–2025 | Dender EH | 73 | (2) |
| 2025– | Kortrijk | 27 | (0) |

International career
| 2013 | Belgium U19 | 4 | (0) |
- * Club domestic league appearances and goals as of 19 April 2026

Gilles Ruyssen (born 18 June 1994) is a Belgian professional footballer who plays for Kortrijk in the Challenger Pro League as a center back.

== Club career ==
He made his Belgian Pro League debut on 3 May 2014 in the last game of the 2013–14 season for Gent against K. Lierse S.K. He played the full game in a 4–0 home win at the Ghelamco Arena.

On 31 May 2025, Ruyssen signed a two-year contract with Kortrijk.
