= Cédric Mitu =

Congolese footballer

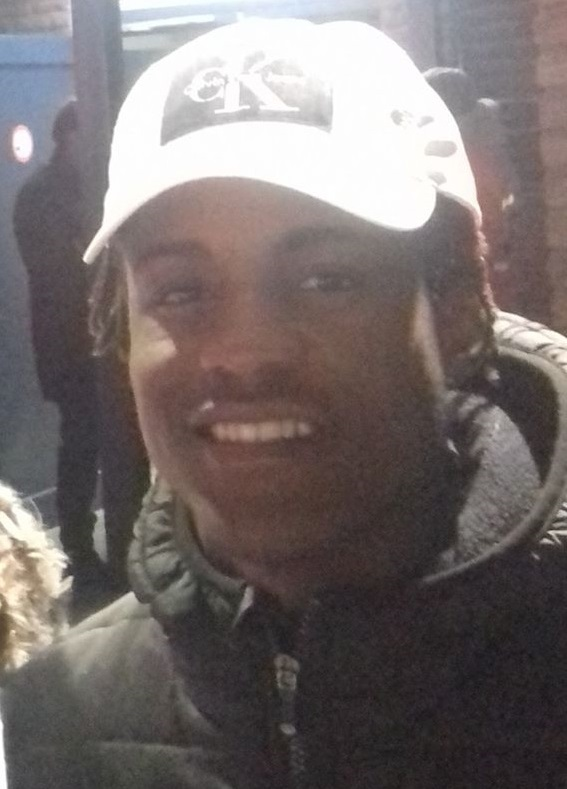
- Mitu in 2018

Personal information
- Full name: Cédric Makekula Muendele Mitu
- Date of birth: 14 January 1995 (age 31)
- Place of birth: Kinshasa, Zaire
- Position: Forward

Team information
- Current team: Wetteren
- Number: 10

Youth career
- SKV Overmere
- Lokeren

Senior career*
| Years | Team | Apps | (Gls) |
| 2012–2014 | Lokeren | 1 | (0) |
| 2014–2015 | Zulte Waregem | 0 | (0) |
| 2015–2016 | Bornem | 28 | (4) |
| 2016–2020 | Eendracht Aalst | 92 | (27) |
| 2020–2021 | Londerzeel | 4 | (0) |
| 2021 | Sint-Eloois-Winkel | 3 | (0) |
| 2022– | Wetteren | 76 | (13) |
- * Club domestic league appearances and goals as of 13:55, 15 June 2024 (UTC)

Cédric Makekula Muendele Mitu (born 14 January 1995) is a Congolese professional footballer who plays as a forward for Wetteren. His first football club was SKV Overmere.

== Career ==
When Mitu was eight, his parents moved from the Congolese capital Kinshasa to Belgium. The family settled in Berlare where young Mitu joined local club SKV Overmere, where he was plucked away by Sporting Lokeren's youth scouts after barely one year. At Lokeren, Mitu made it all the way to the first team squad a few years later.

Mitu made his first appearance in the Belgian Pro League for Lokeren on 8 December 2012 against KV Mechelen, after a substitution.

Between 2016 and 2020, Mitu played for Eendracht Aalst. In April 2020, he moved to Londerzeel.

In January 2021, Mitu signed with Sint-Eloois-Winkel. He made his debut for the club on 31 October 2021, coming on as a late substitute for Nagim Amini in a 1–1 draw against RFC Liège in the third-tier Belgian National Division 1.
