= Darwin Andrade =

Colombian footballer (born 1991)

Personal information
- Full name: Darwin Zamir Andrade Marmolejo
- Date of birth: 11 February 1991 (age 35)
- Place of birth: Quibdó, Colombia
- Height: 1.73 m (5 ft 8 in)
- Position: Left back

Team information
- Current team: Jaguares de Córdoba
- Number: 27

Senior career*
Years	Team	Apps	(Gls)
2010–2014	La Equidad	94	(3)
2014	St. Truiden	0	(0)
2014	→ Újpest (loan)	0	(0)
2014–2015	Újpest	1	(0)
2014–2015	→ Standard Liège (loan)	19	(0)
2015–2017	Standard Liège	32	(1)
2017–2022	Deportivo Cali	128	(2)
2023	Águilas Doradas	1	(0)
2023–	Jaguares de Córdoba	40	(0)

International career^{‡}
2015	Colombia	3	(0)
- * Club domestic league appearances and goals as of 28 March 2025 ‡ National team caps and goals as of 6 June 2015

Darwin Zamir Andrade Marmolejo (born 11 February 1991) is a Colombian football player who plays as a left back for Jaguares de Córdoba.

== Honours ==
Standard Liège

- Belgian Cup: 2015–16

Deportivo Cali

- Categoría Primera A: 2021–II
