= Bobley Anderson =

Ivorian footballer

Personal information
- Full name: Bobley Anderson Allegne
- Date of birth: 3 March 1992 (age 34)
- Place of birth: La Boa, Ivory Coast
- Height: 1.85 m (6 ft 1 in)
- Position: Attacking midfielder

Youth career
- AFAD Djékanou

Senior career*
Years	Team	Apps	(Gls)
2010–2012	AFAD Djékanou		
2012–2013	Wydad Casablanca	24	(3)
2013–2015	Málaga	8	(0)
2014	→ Zulte Waregem (loan)	4	(0)
2014–2015	→ Alcorcón (loan)	17	(1)
2015–2016	Châteauroux	1	(1)

International career
2012	Ivory Coast U23	1	(0)
- * Club domestic league appearances and goals as of 21:05, 4 February 2018 (UTC)

Bobley Anderson Allegne (born 3 March 1992), is an Ivorian footballer who plays as an attacking midfielder.

== Club career ==
A youth product of the AFAD Djékanou, Anderson was promoted to the club's first team squad in 2010, aged 18. He was part of the team which finished as second in the 2011 Ivorian Ligue 1, and appeared in the following year's CAF Champions League.

On 17 July 2012, Anderson signed a five-year contract with Moroccan club Wydad Casablanca for 200.000 MAD. He appeared regularly for the club, playing in 24 matches and scoring three goals.

On 4 July 2013, Anderson signed a five-year deal with La Liga side Málaga CF. He made his debut in the competition on 17 August, coming on as a second-half substitute in a 0–1 loss at Valencia CF.

On 24 January 2014, Anderson moved to SV Zulte Waregem on loan until June. After appearing sparingly, he returned to the Andalusians in June and moved to AD Alcorcón on 1 September, in the same predicament.

Anderson scored his first goal in Spain on 21 December 2014, in a 1–2 away loss against Sporting de Gijón in the Segunda División championship. On 30 June of the following year he was released by the Andalusians, after his loan ended.

== International career ==
Anderson made his debut for Ivory Coast U23 in January 2012 in a friendly match against Niger.

== Club statistics ==
As of 6 April 2015

Club	Season	League		Cup		Continental		Total	
Club	Season	Apps	Goals	Apps	Goals	Apps	Goals	Apps	Goals
AFAD Djékanou	2011	?	?	—	—	—	—	—	—
AFAD Djékanou	2012	?	?	—	—	4	1	4	1
AFAD Djékanou	Total	?	?	—	—	4	1	4	1
Wydad Casablanca	2012–13	24	3	—	—	—	—	24	3
Wydad Casablanca	Total	24	3	—	—	—	—	24	3
Málaga	2013–14	8	0	1	0	0	0	9	0
Málaga	Total	8	0	1	0	0	0	9	0
Zulte Waregem (loan)	2013–14	4	0	1	0	0	0	5	0
Zulte Waregem (loan)	Total	4	0	1	0	0	0	5	0
Alcorcón (loan)	2014–15	17	1	1	0	0	0	18	1
Alcorcón (loan)	Total	17	1	1	0	0	0	18	1
Career Total		53	4	3	0	4	1	60	5

== Honours ==
=== Club ===
AFAD Djékanou

- Côte d'Ivoire Ligue 1: 2011 (runner-up)

=== Individual ===
- Côte d'Ivoire Ligue 1 Best Player: 2011
