= Nicolas Perez =

French footballer (born 1990)

Personal information
- Date of birth: 26 October 1990 (age 36)
- Place of birth: Marseille, France
- Height: 1.80 m (5 ft 11 in)
- Position: Striker

Team information
- Current team: FC UNA Strassen
- Number: 90

Senior career*
Years	Team	Apps	(Gls)
2009-2010	FC Gueugnon	2	(0)
2012-2013	CSO Amnéville	32	(13)
2013-2014	Lille II	13	(11)
2013-2015	→ Royal Excel Mouscron (loan)	22	(6)
2015-2016	FC Martigues	15	(1)
2017-2018	FC Differdange 03	24	(17)
2018-2019	F91 Dudelange	16	(7)
2020-2021	FC Swift Hesperange	25	(9)
2021–	FC UNA Strassen	150	(60)
- * Club domestic league appearances and goals as of 21 September 2026

Nicolas Perez (born October 26, 1990) is a French footballer who plays for Luxembourgish side FC UNA Strassen.

== Career ==
From Marseille, he played for FC Gueugnon from the age of 15 years-old and turned professional with Lille OSC but terminated his contract a year early due to a lack of playing time. He also played for CSO Amnéville, Royal Excel Mouscron and FC Martigues. He joined Luxembourg side F91 Dudelange in 2017. For them, Perez played in the UEFA Champions League qualifiers against MOL Vidi FC and played in the Luxembourgers successful run to the UEFA Europa League group stages beating CFR Cluj and Legia Warsaw. Perez joined FC UNA Strassen from FC Swift Hesperange in the summer of 2021.
