= Sven Dhoest =

Belgian footballer

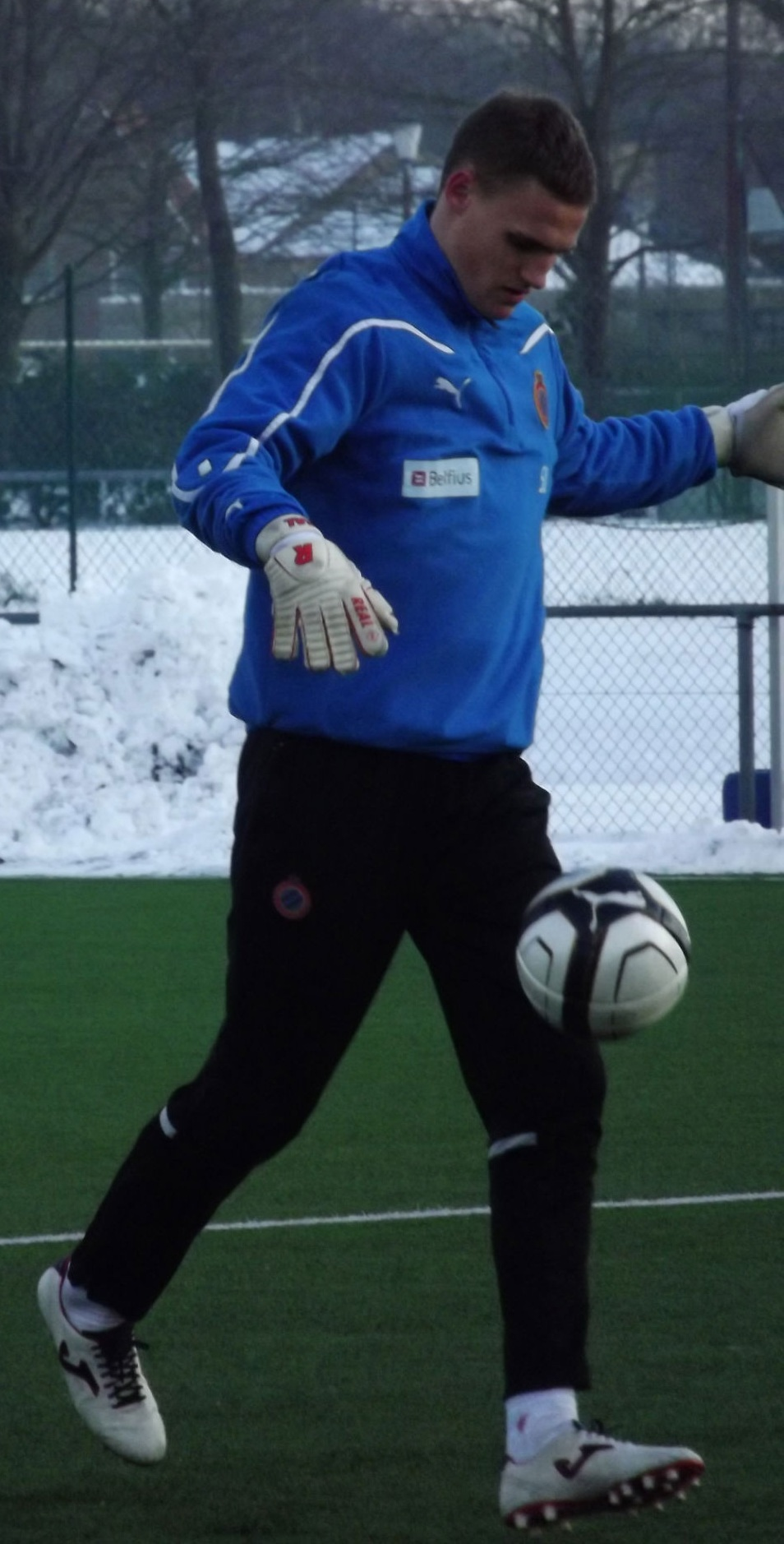

Personal information
- Date of birth: 9 April 1994 (age 32)
- Place of birth: Bruges, Belgium
- Height: 1.86 m (6 ft 1 in)
- Position: Goalkeeper

Team information
- Current team: Knokke
- Number: 1

Youth career
- 2000–2005: KFC Varsenare
- 2005–2010: Club Brugge

Senior career*
Years	Team	Apps	(Gls)
2010–2015	Club Brugge	1	(0)
2014–2015	→ Mouscron (loan)	0	(0)
2015–2016	RFC Wetteren		
2016–2019	Sint-Eloois-Winkel		
2019–	Knokke	39	(0)

International career
2009	Belgium U15	2	(0)
2009	Belgium U16	4	(0)
2009–2011	Belgium U17	25	(1)
2012–2013	Belgium U19	5	(0)
- * Club domestic league appearances and goals as of 21:10, 19 December 2021 (UTC)

Sven Dhoest (born 9 April 1994) is a Belgian professional footballer who plays as a goalkeeper for Knokke.

== Career ==
Ahead of the 2019–20 season, Dhoest joined Knokke. The two-year deal was already signed in February 2019.
