= Laurens Vermijl =

Belgian footballer (born 1997)

Personal information
- Date of birth: 3 February 1997 (age 29)
- Place of birth: Peer, Belgium
- Position: Winger

Team information
- Current team: Bocholt VV
- Number: 18

Youth career
- –2014: Lommel United
- 2014–2017: Genk

Senior career*
| Years | Team | Apps | (Gls) |
| 2016–2017 | Genk | 1 | (0) |
| 2017–2020 | Lommel | 61 | (7) |
| 2020 | → Thes (loan) | 4 | (0) |
| 2020–2024 | Thes | 66 | (11) |
| 2024– | Bocholt VV | 13 | (2) |
- * Club domestic league appearances and goals as of 19:24, 30 November 2024 (UTC)

Laurens Vermijl (born 3 February 1997) is a Belgian footballer who plays as a winger for Belgian Division 2 club Bocholt VV.

Vermijl made his professional debut for Genk in May 2017, in a 1–1 draw with Lokeren, as part of the 2016–17 Belgian First Division A.

He is the brother of Marnick Vermijl, who is also a professional footballer.
