= Alessio Alessandro =

Belgian footballer (born 1996)

Personal information
- Date of birth: 29 April 1996 (age 30)
- Place of birth: Genk, Belgium
- Height: 1.75 m (5 ft 9 in)
- Position: Midfielder

Team information
- Current team: Houtvenne (on loan from Patro Eisden)
- Number: 6

Youth career
- –2014: Genk

Senior career*
Years	Team	Apps	(Gls)
2014–2016	Genk	0	(0)
2014–2015	→ MVV (loan)	2	(0)
2015–2016	→ Patro Eisden (loan)	4	(0)
2016–2019	Westerlo	43	(0)
2017	→ Hades (loan)		
2019–	Patro Eisden	8	(0)
2021–2023	→ ASV Geel (loan)	12	(2)
2023–	→ Houtvenne (loan)	3	(0)

International career
2010–2011	Belgium U15	6	(0)
2011–2012	Belgium U16	9	(0)
2012–2013	Belgium U17	14	(2)
2014	Belgium U18	1	(0)
2014	Belgium U19	3	(0)
- * Club domestic league appearances and goals as of 9 September 2023

Alessio Alessandro (born 29 April 1996) is a Belgian professional footballer who plays as a midfielder for Houtvenne on loan from Patro Eisden.

== Club career ==
Born in Genk, Alessandro kicked off his career with local club Genk in 2014. He was immediately loaned out to Eerste Divisie club MVV Maastricht along with a host of other teammates. He made his debut against Almere City where he was substituted off in the 58th minute.

On 23 October 2019, Alessandro joined Patro Eisden.

For the 2023–24 season, Alessandro was loaned to Houtvenne.
