= Nolan Mbemba =

French footballer (born 1995)

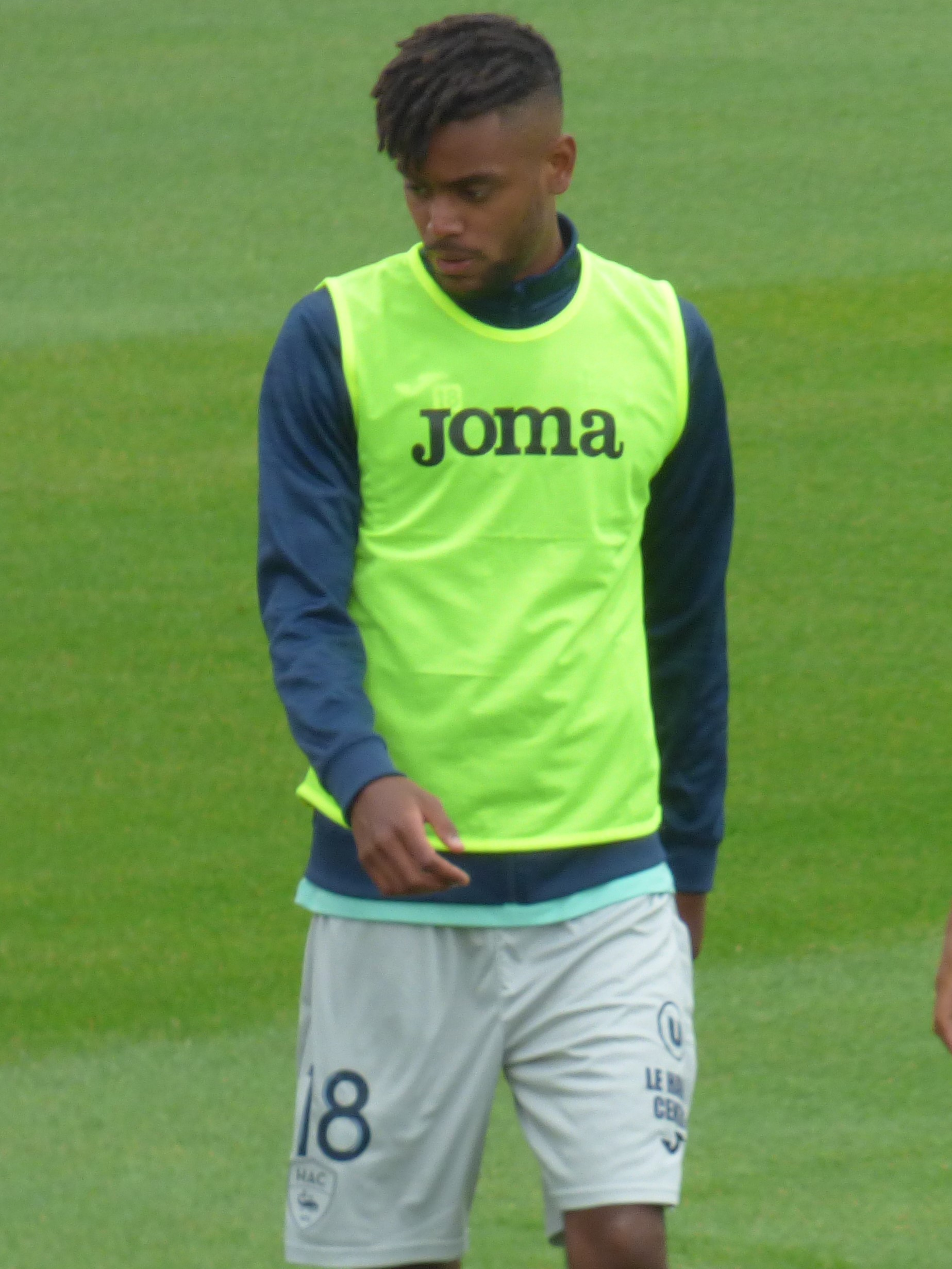
- Mbemba with Le Havre in 2020

Personal information
- Date of birth: 19 February 1995 (age 31)
- Place of birth: Amiens, France
- Height: 1.81 m (5 ft 11 in)
- Position: Midfielder

Youth career
- –2013: Lille

Senior career*
Years	Team	Apps	(Gls)
2012–2016	Lille B	57	(13)
2014–2015	→ Mouscron (loan)	13	(0)
2014–2015	Lille	1	(0)
2016–2017	Vitória Guimarães B	5	(0)
2017–2020	Reims	24	(1)
2018–2019	Reims B	10	(0)
2020–2024	Le Havre	80	(2)
2024–2025	Grenoble	30	(2)

International career^{‡}
2021–	Congo	7	(0)
- * Club domestic league appearances and goals as of 11 May 2025 ‡ National team caps and goals as of 21:08, 16 January 2023 (UTC)

Nolan Mbemba (born 19 February 1995) is a professional footballer who plays as a midfielder. Born in France, he represents Republic of the Congo internationally.

== Club career ==
Mbemba is a youth exponent from Lille. During the 2014–15 season, he joined Royal Mouscron-Péruwelz on a loan deal. He made his top division debut on 15 August 2014 against Standard Liège in a 5–2 home win. On 21 November 2015, he made his debut with Lille's first team on an away draw against Troyes.

In May 2016 Mbemba moved to Portugal, signing for Vitória Guimarães.

Mbemba helped Reims win the 2017–18 Ligue 2, helping promote them to the Ligue 1 for the 2018–19 season.

On 22 January 2024, Mbemba signed a contract with Grenoble until June 2025.

== International career ==
Mbemba was born in France and is of Republic of the Congo, and Democratic Republic of the Congo descent. He was called up to the DR Congo national under-20 football team for a friendly against France U20s in 2015.

He later switched his international allegiance to the Republic of the Congo. He made his debut for the Congo national football team on 2 September 2021 in a World Cup qualifier against Namibia, a 1–1 away draw. He started and played a full game.

== Career statistics ==
As of 7 June 2024

Appearances and goals by club, season and competition
Club	Season	League			National cup		Continental		Other		Total	
Club	Season	Division	Apps	Goals	Apps	Goals	Apps	Goals	Apps	Goals	Apps	Goals
Lille B	2012-13	Championnat National 2	12	2	—		—		—		12	2
Lille B	2013-14	Championnat National 2	26	5	—		—		—		26	5
Lille B	2015-16	Championnat National 3	19	6	—		—		—		19	6
Lille B	Total		57	13	—		—		—		57	13
Mouscron (loan)	2014-15	Belgian Pro League	13	0	1	0	—		—		14	0
Lille	2015-16	Ligue 1	1	0	—		—		0	0	1	0
Lille	2016-17	Ligue 1	—		—		0	0	—		0	0
Lille	Total		1	0	—		0	0	0	0	1	0
Vitória Guimarães	2016-17	Primeira Liga	0	0	1	0	—		1 (Note: Appearance(s) in Taça da Liga)	0	2	0
Vitória Guimarães B	2016-17	Liga Portugal 2	5	0	—		—		—		5	0
Reims	2017-18	Ligue 2	16	1	—		—		—		16	1
Reims	2018-19	Ligue 1	8	0	2	0	—		0	0	10	0
Reims	2019-20	Ligue 1	0	0	—		—		0	0	0	0
Reims	Total		24	1	2	0	—		0	0	26	1
Reims B	2017-18	Championnat National 2	2	0	—		—		—		2	0
Reims B	2018-19	Championnat National 2	4	0	—		—		—		4	0
Reims B	2019-20	Championnat National 2	4	0	—		—		—		4	0
Reims B	Total		10	0	—		—		—		10	0
Le Havre	2020-21	Ligue 2	23	1	1	0	—		—		24	1
Le Havre	2021-22	Ligue 2	21	0	1	0	—		—		22	0
Le Havre	2022-23	Ligue 2	30	0	1	0	—		—		31	0
Le Havre	2023-24	Ligue 1	6	1	1	0	—		—		7	1
Le Havre	Total		80	2	4	0	—		—		84	2
Grenoble	2023-24	Ligue 2	15	1	—		—		—		15	1
Career total			205	17	8	0	0	0	1	0	214	17

== Honours ==
Reims

- Ligue 2: 2017–18
