= Georgios Kaminiaris =

Belgian footballer

Personal information
- Full name: Georgios Kaminiaris
- Date of birth: 20 October 1988 (age 38)
- Place of birth: Belgium
- Height: 1.73 m (5 ft 8 in)
- Position: Left-back

Senior career*
Years	Team	Apps	(Gls)
2009–2011	Royal Francs-Borains	52	(1)
2011–2012	UR La Louvière Centre	36	(0)
2012–2014	KV Oostende	28	(0)
2014–2015	RAEC Mons	34	(0)
2015–	RU Saint-Gilloise	31	(0)
- * Club domestic league appearances and goals as of 7 December 2016 (UTC)

Georgios Kaminiaris (born 20 October 1988) is a Belgian former footballer who played for RAEC Mons as a left-back.
