= Mehdi Tarfi =

Belgian footballer

Personal information
- Date of birth: 5 July 1993 (age 33)
- Place of birth: Brussels, Belgium
- Height: 1.78 m (5 ft 10 in)
- Position: Midfielder

Team information
- Current team: Houtvenne
- Number: 11

Youth career
- –2013: Anderlecht

Senior career*
Years	Team	Apps	(Gls)
2013–2015	Anderlecht	0	(0)
2013–2014	→ Zulte Waregem (loan)	1	(0)
2015–2016	Antwerp	2	(0)
2016–2018	Dender EH	50	(5)
2018–2022	Deinze	89	(12)
2022–2024	Lierse	25	(0)
2024–	Houtvenne	14	(1)

International career
2008	Belgium U15	1	(0)
2008–2009	Belgium U16	3	(0)
2011	Belgium U18	2	(0)
2012	Belgium U19	2	(0)
2013	Belgium U21	1	(0)
- * Club domestic league appearances and goals as of 14 December 2025

Mehdi Tarfi (born 5 July 1993) is a Belgian footballer who plays for Belgian Division 1 club Houtvenne.
