= Anthony Van Loo =

Belgian footballer (born 1988)

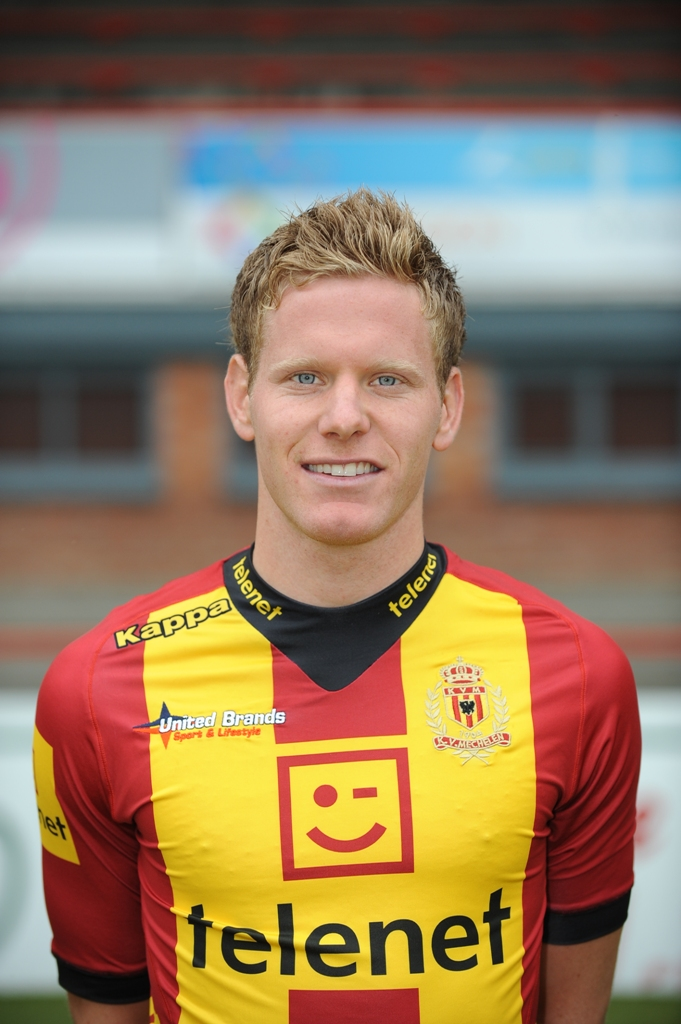

Personal information
- Date of birth: 5 October 1988 (age 38)
- Place of birth: Roeselare, Belgium
- Height: 1.78 m (5 ft 10 in)
- Position: Right back

Youth career
- Roeselare

Senior career*
Years	Team	Apps	(Gls)
2007–2010	Roeselare	41	(0)
2010–2014	KV Mechelen	49	(0)
2014–2018	Kortrijk	30	(0)

International career
2008–2009	Belgium U21	4	(0)
- * Club domestic league appearances and goals as of 28 December 2015

Anthony Van Loo (born 5 October 1988) is a Belgian retired football defender, who last played for Kortrijk in the Belgian First Division A.

== Career ==
Around June 2008 he was diagnosed with a heart condition, but was allowed to resume his career after having a defibrillator implanted. A video clip showing Van Loo's defibrillator at work, shocking his heart back into a normal rhythm after he had suffered a cardiac arrhythmia during a match, was posted to YouTube on 8 June 2009.

In 2015, he drew interest from Zawisza Bydgoszcz. After his visit, he heavily criticised the club's management, training, and the accommodation he was given during his stay before announcing "Never again!". Officially the club stated that the reason for the transfer falling through was because he failed the medical.

Van Loo collapsed again in May 2018 in a match against Excel Mouscron. In November 2018 he concluded, after a medical visit, that although his recovery was going well, he would never be able to return to his former level of play, leading him to announce his retirement from football.

== International ==
Van Loo was a member of Belgium's squad for the 2007–09 International Challenge Trophy.
