= Wouter Corstjens =

Dutch-born Belgian footballer

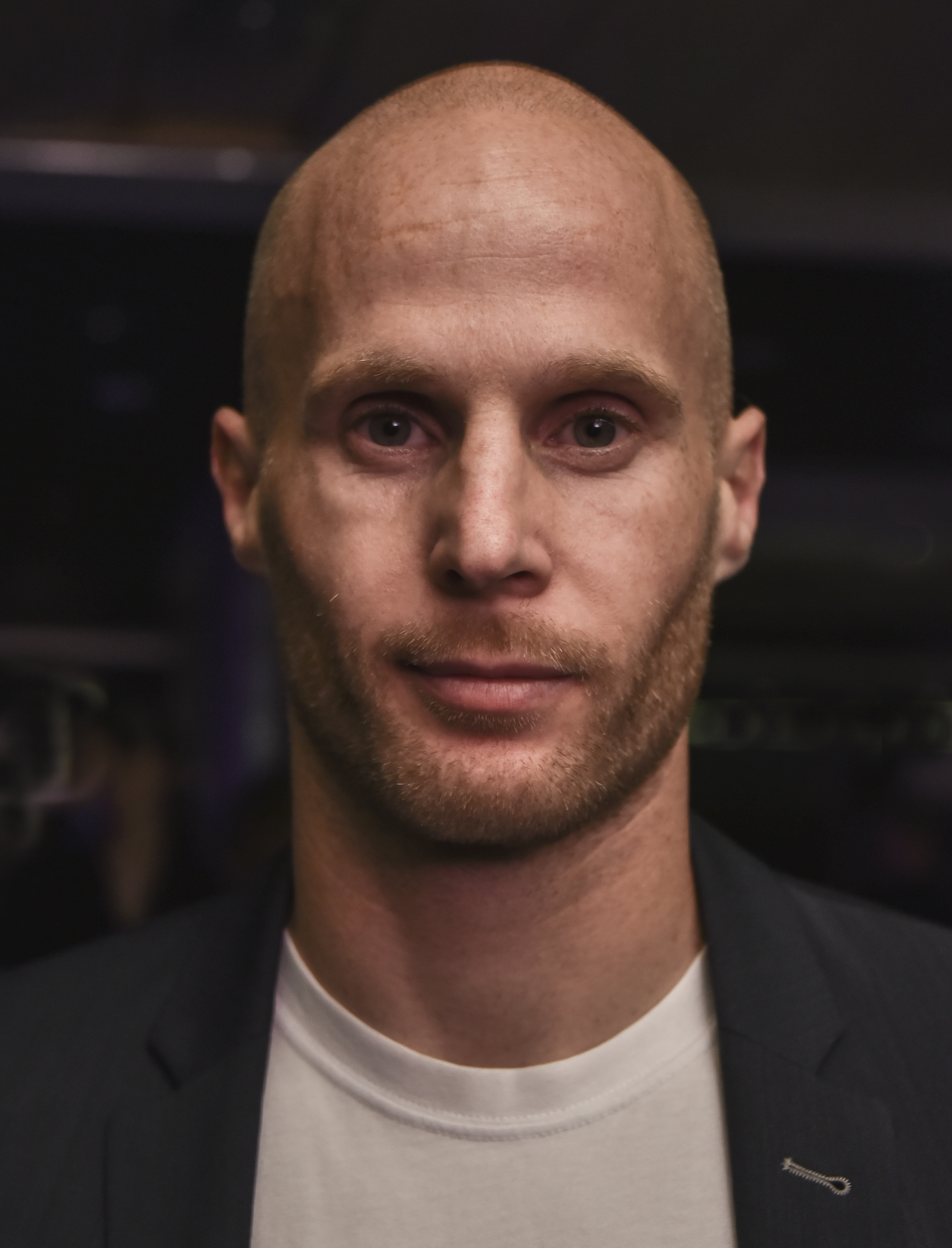

Personal information
- Full name: Wouter Corstjens
- Date of birth: 13 February 1987 (age 39)
- Place of birth: Maastricht, Netherlands
- Height: 1.85 m (6 ft 1 in)
- Position: Centre back

Team information
- Current team: Patro Eisden
- Number: 4

Youth career
- Genk

Senior career*
Years	Team	Apps	(Gls)
2006	Genk	1	(0)
2006–2012	Westerlo	150	(6)
2012–2015	Gent	0	(0)
2013	→ Westerlo (loan)	8	(0)
2013–2014	→ Lierse (loan)	19	(1)
2014	→ Waasland-Beveren (loan)	22	(1)
2015–2016	Panetolikos	3	(0)
2017	Lommel United	12	(2)
2017–2020	Westerlo	47	(2)
2019–2020	→ Patro Eisden (loan)	20	(0)
2020–	Patro Eisden	91	(6)

International career
2002–2003	Belgium U16	17	(0)
2003–2004	Belgium U17	11	(3)
2005	Belgium U18	2	(0)
2006	Belgium U19	6	(0)
2006–2007	Belgium U20	2	(0)
2007–2008	Belgium U21	10	(0)
- * Club domestic league appearances and goals as of 12 May 2024

Wouter Corstjens (born 13 February 1987) is a Dutch-born Belgian football defender, who currently plays for K. Patro Eisden Maasmechelen.
