= Hervé Kage =

Congolese footballer

Personal information
- Date of birth: 10 April 1989 (age 37)
- Place of birth: Kinshasa, Zaire
- Height: 1.79 m (5 ft 10 in)
- Position: Winger

Team information
- Current team: Virton
- Number: 77

Youth career
- 2002–2004: FC ASSE–Zellik 2002
- 2004–2006: Anderlecht

Senior career*
Years	Team	Apps	(Gls)
2007–2009	Anderlecht	0	(0)
2007	→ RKC Waalwijk (loan)	2	(0)
2008	→ Union SG (loan)	14	(1)
2009–2013	Charleroi	88	(6)
2011	→ Beitar Jerusalem (loan)	6	(0)
2013–2014	Gent	43	(10)
2014–2015	Genk	22	(3)
2015–2020	Kortrijk	81	(15)
2018	→ Karabükspor (loan)	13	(0)
2018–2019	→ Adana Demirspor (loan)	24	(3)
2021	Swift Hesperange	0	(0)
2021–2022	Botoșani	14	(3)
2022–	Virton	27	(3)

International career^{‡}
2004	Belgium U15	1	(0)
2007	Belgium U18	9	(4)
2009	Belgium U20	1	(0)
2009	Belgium U21	1	(0)
2008	DR Congo U23	2	(0)
2012–2017	DR Congo	5	(0)
- * Club domestic league appearances and goals as of 15 June 2023 ‡ National team caps and goals as of 5 January 2017

Hervé Kage (born 10 April 1989) is a Congolese footballer who plays for Belgian First Division B side Virton as winger.

== Career ==
Kage began his career in the youth side with FC ASSE-Zellik 2002 and was in summer 2004 scouted from Anderlecht. On 24 January 2007 left Anderlecht and joined on loan to Eredivisie team Waalwijk. After only two games with Waalwijk in the half-year that he was there, Kage returned to Anderlecht. On 31 January 2008, he was loaned out to farm team Union SG.

After few years with Anderlecht, Kage signed a two years contract on 17 June 2009 with Charleroi.

Before signing a contract at Gent in January 2013 Kage was loaned out to Beitar Jerusalem in 2011.

In July 2014 he joined Genk.

On 29 January 2022, Kage returned to Belgium and signed with Virton.

== International ==
Kage was member of the DR Congo national under-23 football team, and later a part of the DR Congo national football team at the 2015 African Cup of Nations. Kage debuted for DR Congo in a friendly against Cameroon on 7 January 2015.

=== International stats ===
As of matches played 5 January 2017.

National team	Year	Apps	Goals
DR Congo	2012	1	0
DR Congo	2013	0	0
DR Congo	2014	0	0
DR Congo	2015	3	0
DR Congo	2016	0	0
DR Congo	2017	1	0
Total		5	0

== Honours ==
=== Club ===
Charleroi

- Belgian Second Division: 2011–12

=== National ===
DR Congo

- Africa Cup of Nations bronze: 2015
