= Tom Rosenthal (footballer) =

Israeli footballer

Personal information
- Date of birth: 3 September 1996 (age 30)
- Place of birth: London, England
- Position: Midfielder

Youth career
- 2006–2014: Watford

Senior career*
Years	Team	Apps	(Gls)
2014–2015	Zulte-Waregem	4	(0)
2015–2016	Queens Park Rangers	0	(0)
2017–2018	Dordrecht	13	(0)
2018–2020	Tubize	12	(0)

International career^{‡}
2013–2014	Belgium U18	7	(2)
2014–2015	Belgium U19	11	(1)
2018	Israel U21	1	(0)
- * Club domestic league appearances and goals as of 5 July 2019 ‡ National team caps and goals as of 25 March 2018

Tom Rosenthal (born 3 September 1996) is a professional footballer who most recently played as a midfielder for Belgian First Division B side Tubize. He previously played for Watford, Zulte-Waregem and Queens Park Rangers. Born in England, he has represented Israel and Belgium internationally at youth levels.

== Club career ==
Born in London, Rosenthal was in the youth system of English club Watford from the age of 10. His father, 60-cap Israel international Ronny Rosenthal, finished his career in 1999 after two seasons at the club, following seven years playing in the English top flight. Between the ages of 13 and 15 Rosenthal had problems following a growth spurt. He started a two-year scholarship at the start of the 2013–14 season and travelled with the first-team for their FA Cup fixture with Bristol City in January 2014.

On 1 September 2014, Watford announced Rosenthal had moved for an undisclosed fee to Belgian Pro League side Zulte-Waregem in order for him to be closer to an ill family member, signing a two-year professional contract. However, his brother and agent Dean subsequently announced that the main reason Rosenthal had left was due to the prospect of first-team football.

He made his first team debut with Zulte Waregem on 21 January 2015 in the Belgian Cup in a 4–2 away defeat against Anderlecht. He played 58 minutes, before being substituted off for Ghislain Gimbert.

On 11 August 2017, Rosenthal signed for Eerste Divisie side FC Dordrecht on a one-year contract.

== International career ==
A former youth international for Belgium, Rosenthal debuted for the Israel national under-21 football team in a 3–0 2019 UEFA European Under-21 Championship qualification loss to the Germany U21s on 22 March 2018.
