= Pierrick Cros (footballer, born 1991) =

French footballer

Personal information
- Full name: Pierrick Cros
- Date of birth: 23 June 1991 (age 35)
- Place of birth: Albi, France
- Height: 1.85 m (6 ft 1 in)
- Position: Goalkeeper

Youth career
- 1997–1999: Labastide de Levis
- 1999–2005: Le Sequestre la Mygale
- 2005–2006: Toulouse Fontaines
- 2006–2010: Sochaux

Senior career*
Years	Team	Apps	(Gls)
2010–2014	Sochaux	30	(0)
2014–2015	Mouscron-Péruwelz	22	(0)
2016–2017	Red Star	23	(0)

International career
2006–2007	France U16	1	(0)
2007–2008	France U17	1	(0)
2010–2011	France U20	3	(0)
- * Club domestic league appearances and goals as of 21:08, 5 December 2020 (UTC)

Pierrick Cros (born 23 June 1991) is a French footballer who plays as a goalkeeper.

== Overview ==
Cros is a French youth international and has served as the goalkeeper at under-16 and under-17 level. On 30 October 2010, Cros made his professional debut with Sochaux in a league match against Lyon; Sochaux lost the match 2–1.
