= Mustapha Oussalah =

Moroccan footballer

Personal information
- Date of birth: 19 February 1982 (age 44)
- Place of birth: Liège, Belgium
- Height: 1.77 m (5 ft 10 in)
- Position: Midfielder

Senior career*
Years	Team	Apps	(Gls)
2000–2003	Standard Liège	28	(0)
2004	Gent	16	(1)
2005	→ Eupen (loan)	12	(0)
2005–2008	Mouscron	65	(8)
2006–2007	→ Standard Liège (loan)	9	(0)
2009–2014	Kortrijk	139	(12)
2014–2016	Gent	6	(0)
2015–2016	→ Mouscron (loan)	27	(1)
2017	Sprimont Comblain	7	(0)

International career
2003	Morocco	1	(0)
- * Club domestic league appearances and goals

Mustapha Oussalah (born 19 February 1982) is a former professional footballer who played as a midfielder. Born in Belgium, Oussalah represented Morocco internationally.

== Career ==
Born in Liège, Oussalah started in January 2009 as a central midfielder for KV Kortrijk, after being transferred from Excelsior Moeskroen. In his youth, he played at Tilleur-Liégeois and RFC Seraing. Before the 2014–15 season, he moved, together with his coach Hein Vanhaezebrouck of KV Kortrijk, to KAA Gent.
