= Belgium national youth football team =

The Belgium national youth football teams are a group of four teams that represents Belgium in association football at various specific age levels, ranging from under-17 to under-21. All of the teams are controlled by Royal Belgian Football Association, the governing body for football in Belgium.

The four teams are the following:

- Belgium national under-21 football team
- Belgium national under-19 football team
- Belgium national under-18 football team
- Belgium national under-17 football team
