= 2013–14 Belgian Cup =

Tournament details
- Country: Belgium

Final positions
- Champions: Lokeren
- Runners-up: Zulte Waregem

Tournament statistics
- Matches played: 335

The 2013–14 Belgian Cup (also known as Cofidis Cup for sponsorship purposes) was the 59th season of the main knockout football competition in Belgium. It commenced on 26 July 2013 with the first matches of Round 1 and ended on 22 March 2014. The winners qualified for the play-off round of the 2014–15 UEFA Europa League and the 2014 Belgian Super Cup. Genk were the defending champions, but they did not retain their title as they were eliminated at the quarter-final by Oostende.

Lokeren won the trophy after beating Zulte Waregem 1-0 in the final on 22 March 2014.

== Competition format ==
The competition consists of ten rounds. The first seven rounds are held as single-match elimination rounds. When tied after 90 minutes in the first three rounds, penalties are taken immediately. In rounds four to seven, when tied after 90 minutes first an extra time period of 30 minutes are played, then penalties are taken if still necessary. The quarter- and semifinals will be played over two legs, where the team winning on aggregate advances. The final will be played as a single match.

Teams enter the competition in different rounds, based upon their 2012–13 league affiliation. Teams from the fourth-level Promotion or lower began in Round 1. Third Division teams entered in Round 3, with Second Division teams joining in the following round. Teams from the Belgian First Division enter in Round 6.

Round	Clubs remaining	Clubs involved	Winners from previous round	New entries this round	Leagues entering at this round
Round 1	286	216	none	216	Levels 4 to 8 in football league pyramid
Round 2	182	112	104 (+8 bye)	none	none
Round 3	126	92	56	36	Belgian Third Division
Round 4	80	64	46	18	Belgian Second Division
Round 5	48	32	32	none	none
Round 6	32	32	16	16	Belgian Pro League
Round 7	16	16	16	none	none
Quarter-Finals	8	8	8	none	none
Semi-Finals	4	4	4	none	none
Final	2	2	2	none	none

== First round ==
These round of matches were played on 26, 27 & 28 July 2013.

Tie no	Home team (tier)	Score	Away team (tier)
1.	Bastogne (5)	0–3	Lorraine Arlon (4)
2.	Royal Aubel (6)	1–3	Royal Aywaille (4)
3.	Excelsior Vorst (6)	1–3	Averbode Okselaar (5)
4.	Vosselaar (4)	1–2	Putte (6)
5.	Club Roeselare (5)	0–3	Olympic Molensport Ingelmunster (4)
6.	Osta Meerbeke (6)	2–2 (4–3p)	Destelbergen (6)
7.	Landen (5)	5–2	Lindelhoeven (5)
8.	Berlaar-Heikant (5)	0–1	Sint-Lenaarts (4)
9.	Olympic Charleroi (4)	6–0	Marbaisien (6)
10.	Mormont (5)	1–0	Montleban (5)
11.	Oostnieuwkerke (6)	0–2	Sporting West Harelbeke (4)
12.	Eendracht Buggenhout (6)	2–4	Voorde (6)
13.	Thes Sport Tessenderlo (5)	2–2 (3–4p)	Eendracht Termien (5)
14.	Beringen (5)	2–1	Overpeltse (4)
15.	Wanze/Bas-Oha (6)	0–1	De Liege (4)
16.	Clermont (6)	1–3	Vencimontois (6)
17.	Grasheide (6)	1–6	Zwarte Leeuw (4)
18.	La Roche (5)	5–1	Nothomb-Post (6)
19.	Oppagne-Wéris (5)	0–3	Saint-Louis-Saint-Léger (5)
20.	Rossignol (5)	1–0	Royal Entente Bertrigeoise (4)
21.	Wingene (6)	2–0	Helkijn (6)
22.	Wevelgem City (6)	0–0 (4–5p)	De Ruiter Roeselare (6)
23.	Damme (6)	4–0	Oostende (6)
24.	Racing Waregem (4)	1–1 (4–1p)	SK Torhout (6)
25.	Sint-Eloois-Winkel (4)	6–0	Oostduinkerke (6)
26.	Sassport Boezinge (4)	5–1	White Star Adinkerke (6)
27.	Westhoek (4)	4–0	Royal Knokke (6)
28.	Menen (4)	3–2	Rumbeke (6)
29.	Sparta Petegem (6)	1–0	Acrenoise (4)
30.	Eendracht Zele (4)	2–1	Lessines-Ollignies (6)
31.	Geraardsbergen (6)	1–7	Jong Lede (6)
32.	Fusieclub Merelbeke (6)	1–4	Berlare (4)
33.	Ternat (5)	3–1	Halle (4)
34.	Olympia Sterrebeek (4)	2–1	Kampenhout (5)
35.	Suryoyés Bruxellois (6)	1–3	Tempo Overijse (4)
36.	Pepingen (4)	4–0	Schaerbeek (5)
37.	Diest (6)	1–1 (2–4p)	Excelsior Leopoldsburg (4)
38.	Etoilés D'Ére-Allain (6)	0–4	Eendracht Wervik (6)
39.	Dosko Kanegem (6)	1–3	Zwevegem Sport (6)
40.	Templeuvois (4)	0–0 (6–5p)	Meulebeke (6)
41.	Pays Blanc Antoinien (6)	2–4	Maldegem (6)
42.	Eernegem (4)	5–3	Royal Dottignies Sports (6)
43.	Gullegem (4)	1–0	Belœil (6)
44.	Sint-Gillis Waas (4)	2–3	Bambrugge (6)
45.	Ostiches (6)	0–5	Dikkelvenne (6)
46.	Sint-Antelinks (6)	1–4	Lebbeke (6)
47.	Svelta Melsele (6)	1–1 (2–4p)	Zelzate (6)
48.	Ronse (4)	2–1	Kunnen Eine (6)
49.	Jong Vlaanderen Kruibeke (6)	0–2	TK Meldert (4)
50.	Union Lovenjoel (6)	1–3	BX Brussels (4)
51.	Léopold Uccle-Woluwé (4)	1–1 (4–2p)	Sporting Bruxelles (6)
52.	Jeunesse Molenbeek (6)	0–15	Ganshoren (4)

Tie no	Home team (tier)	Score	Away team (tier)
53.	Hoeilaart (6)	1–2	Wolvertem (4)
54.	Waterloo (5)	2–4	Tienen (4)
55.	Eendracht Hekelgem (6)	3–0	Itna Itterbeek (6)
56.	Sporting Erps-Kwerps (6)	1–2	Olympia Wijgmaal (4)
57.	Opwijk (5)	2–5	VC Groot Dilbeek (6)
58.	Wellen (5)	3–0	Samen Sport Doen Opoeteren (6)
59.	White Star Linkhout (6)	0–4	Vlijtingen Vlug En Vrig (4)
60.	Nieuwe Kempen (6)	0–8	Spouwen-Mopertingen (4)
61.	Moelingen (5)	0–3	Lutlommel (4)
62.	Herk-De-Stad (5)	1–1 (3–5p)	Esperanza Neerpelt (4)
63.	Hades (4)	3–2	Waltwilder (5)
64.	Zonhoven (5)	6–1	Herderen-Millen (6)
65.	Bree (4)	3–0	Racing Peer (6)
66.	Schelle Sport (6)	0–3	Blauwvoet Oevel (6)
67.	FC Turnhout (6)	2–1	Tielen-Lichtaart (5)
68.	Lyra (4)	2–1	Rapid Leest (6)
69.	Duffel (4)	1–0	Wuustwezel (6)
70.	Merksem (4)	4–1	Houtvenne (5)
71.	Katelijne-Waver (5)	0–5	Witgoor Dessel (4)
72.	Groen Rood Katelijne (5)	4–2	Berlaar (6)
73.	Sint-Job (4)	2–2 (4–5p)	Excelsior Kaart (5)
74.	Entente Binchoise (4)	4–1	Royal Léopold Club Hornu (6)
75.	Wallonia Walhain (4)	3–2	Ransartoise (6)
76.	Anderlues (6)	2–5	Meux (4)
77.	Sporting Châtelet (6)	4–1	Rhisnois (6)
78.	Wépionnais (6)	1–2	Sartois (6)
79.	Union Royale Namur (4)	5–0	Turque (6)
80.	Ronquières-Hy 86 (6)	0–4	Genly-Quévy (4)
81.	Fontainoise (6)	1–7	Grand-Leez (5)
82.	Charleroi (4)	0–5 (awarded)	Entité Manageoise (5)
83.	Houdeng (6)	1–2	Loyers (5)
84.	Forchies (6)	0–4	Ligny (5)
85.	Royal Jeunesse Aischoise (5)	2–5	Onhaye (4)
86.	Hannutois (6)	4–3	Vyle-Tharoul (6)
87.	Xhoffraix (6)	0–0 (5–3p)	Royale Entente Racing Club Amay (5)
88.	Jalhaytois (6)	1–3	Raeren (5)
89.	Cointe-Liège (6)	1–0	Solières Sport (4)
90.	Royale Union Momalloise (6)	1–4	Tilleur-Saint-Gilles (5)
91.	Faymonville (4)	3–1	Ster-Francorchamps (6)
92.	Cité Sport (4)	8–0	Royal Standard (6)
93.	Stade Disonais (5)	2–3	Hamoir (4)
94.	Etoile Elsautoise (5)	0–5	Royal Spa (4)
95.	Champlon (5)	4–2	Meix-Devant-Virton (5)
96.	Vance (6)	1–2	Rus Melreux (6)
97.	Libramont (6)	4–2	Espérance Han-Sur-Lesse (6)
98.	Habaysienne (6)	2–3	Bomal (5)
99.	Givry (4)	6–0	Châtillon (6)
100.	Seraing Athlétique (6)	0–0 (4–3p)	Stockay-Warfusée (6)
101.	De Jeugd Lovendegem (6)	0–2	Wetteren-Kwatrecht (4)
102.	Hooikt (6)	1–2	Ternesse (5)
103.	Longlier (4)	1–0	Rochefortoise Jemelle (5)
104.	Terjoden-Welle (4)	2–0	Appelterre-Eichem (6)

On top of these fixtures, 8 teams received a bye to the second round, namely Torpedo Hasselt (6), Belgica Edegem (6), Wilrijk (6), Assesse (6), Spy (5), Couvin-Mariembourg (4), Gouy (6) and Wellin (5).

== Second round ==
These round of matches were played on 3 & 4 August 2013.

Tie no	Home team (tier)	Score	Away team (tier)
1.	Templeuvois (4)	1–2	Gullegem (4)
2.	Maldegem (6)	1–7	Westhoek (4)
3.	Olympic Molensport Ingelmunster (4)	2–0	Eendracht Wervik (6)
4.	Entente Binchoise (4)	2–1	Onhaye (4)
5.	Mormont (5)	2–0	Saint-Louis-Saint-Léger (5)
6.	Excelsior Leopoldsburg (4)	1–1 (3–0p)	Beringen (5)
7.	Vlijtingen Vlug En Vrij (4)	1–1 (8–9p)	Torpedo Hasselt (6)
8.	Libramont (6)	5–2	Rus Melreux (6)
9.	Cité Sport (4)	3–3 (4–5p)	De Liege (4)
10.	Sporting West Harelbeke (4)	1–2	Menen (4)
11.	Sint-Eloois-Winkel (4)	3–2	Zwevegem Sport (5)
12.	De Ruiter Roeselare (5)	1–3	Eernegem (4)
13.	Wingene (5)	1–2	Sassport Boezinge (4)
14.	Racing Waregem (4)	1–2	Damme (5)
15.	Voorde (5)	0–2	Eendracht Zele (4)
16.	Sparta Petegem (6)	1–3	Wetteren-Kwatrecht (4)
17.	Ronse (4)	1–0	Zelzate (5)
18.	Lebbeke (5)	4–0	Bambrugge (5)
19.	Osta Meerbeke (6)	3–3 (3–1p)	Berlare (4)
20.	Halle (4)	1–3	Olympia Wijgmaal (4)
21.	Eendracht Hekelgem (6)	0–3	Tempo Overijse (4)
22.	Tienen (4)	0–0 (4–5p)	Wolvertem (4)
23.	Léopold Uccle-Woluwé (4)	1–2	Olympia Sterrebeek (4)
24.	VC Groot Dilbeek (6)	0–3	Pepingen (4)
25.	Ganshoren (4)	0–2	BX Brussels (4)
26.	Eendracht Termien (5)	1–1 (3–5p)	Spouwen-Mopertingen (4)
27.	Bree (4)	2–5	Esperanza Neerpelt (4)
28.	Hades (4)	2–1	Zonhoven (5)

Tie no	Home team (tier)	Score	Away team (tier)
29.	Lutlommel (4)	2–1	Landen (5)
30.	Wellen (5)	1–3	Averbode Okselaar (5)
31.	Witgoor Dessel (4)	2–0	Blauwvoet Oevel (6)
32.	Union Royale Namur (4)	2–0	Sartois (6)
33.	Sporting Châtelet (5)	2–2 (3–5p)	Wallonia Walhain (4)
34.	Vencimontois (6)	0–3	Grand-Leez (5)
35.	Loyers (5)	3–0	Ligny (6)
36.	Meux (4)	1–1 (4–5p)	Entité Manageoise (5)
37.	Royal Aywaille (4)	2–0	Seraing Athlétique (6)
38.	Hannutois (6)	2–1	Xhoffraix (6)
39.	Cointe-Liège (5)	2–2 (4–5p)	Tilleur-Saint-Gilles (5)
40.	Champlon (5)	0–2	Lorraine Arlon (4)
41.	Belgica Edegem (6)	0–4	Duffel (4)
42.	Putte (6)	1–0	Wilrijk (6)
43.	Assesse (6)	0–3	Spy (5)
44.	Genly-Quévy (4)	11–0	Gouy (6)
45.	Sint-Lenaarts (4)	2–2 (4–3p)	Lyra (4)
46.	Couvin-Mariembourg (4)	0–3	Olympic Charleroi (4)
47.	Faymonville (4)	1–2	Hamoir (4)
48.	Royal Spa (4)	2–0	Raeren (5)
49.	Excelsior Kaart (5)	2–2 (5–3p)	Ternesse (6)
50.	FC Turnhout (6)	1–3	Groen Rood Katelijne (5)
51.	Dikkelvenne (5)	1–1 (4–2p)	Jong Lede (6)
52.	Givry (4)	2–2 (5–4p)	Bomal (5)
53.	Longlier (4)	2–0	Rossignol (5)
54.	Wellin (6)	1–3	La Roche (5)
55.	Terjoden-Welle (4)	4–1	TK Meldert (4)
56.	Merksem (4)	1–1 (7–8p)	Zwarte Leeuw (4)

== Third round ==
These round of matches are to be played on 10 & 11 August 2013.

Tie no	Home team (tier)	Score	Away team (tier)
1.	Torpedo Hasselt (6)	0–4	Temse (3)
2.	BX Brussels (4)	0–2	Gullegem (4)
3.	Lorraine Arlon (4)	3–3 (2–3p)	Union Saint-Gilloise (3)
4.	Olympic Charleroi (4)	3–3 (3–5p)	La Roche (5)
5.	Géants Athois (3)	5–2	Genly-Quévy (4)
6.	Hades (4)	1–4	Patro Eisden Maasmechelen (3)
7.	Dikkelvenne (5)	1–3	Coxyde (3)
8.	Sint-Lenaarts (4)	1–2	Grimbergen (3)
9.	Zwarte Leeuw (4)	2–2 (6–5p)	Londerzeel (3)
10.	Terjoden-Welle (4)	1–1 (3–5p)	Vigor Wuitens Hamme (3)
11.	Deinze (3)	2–0	Wetteren-Kwatrecht (4)
12.	Wallonne Ciney (3)	3–1	Libramont (6)
13.	Verviers (3)	3–0	Mormont (5)
14.	Tournai (3)	3–2	Groen Rood Katelijne (5)
15.	Bornem (3)	1–3	Westhoek (4)
16.	Damme (5)	0–0 (2–4p)	Grand-Leez (5)
17.	Sint-Eloois-Winkel (4)	2–0	Huy (3)
18.	Olsa Brakel (3)	1–1 (5–6p)	Menen (4)
19.	Pepingen (4)	1–2	Olympic Molensport Ingelmunster (4)
20.	Hamoir (4)	2–5	Sint-Niklaas (3)
21.	Sassport Boezinge (4)	1–2	Sprimont-Comblain (3)
22.	Excelsior Leopoldsburg (4)	1–1 (6–5p)	Royal Charleroi Fleurus (3)
23.	Eendracht Zele (4)	5–1	Lutlommel (4)

Tie no	Home team (tier)	Score	Away team (tier)
24.	Diegem-Sport (3)	1–1 (3–4p)	Duffel (4)
25.	Berchem Sport (3)	1–1 (2–4p)	Esperanza Neerpelt (4)
26.	Union Royale Namur (4)	3–1	Torhout (3)
27.	Wallonia Walhain (4)	3–1	Royal Cappellen (3)
28.	Putte (6)	0–2	La Louvière Centre (3)
29.	Averbode Okselaar (5)	0–4	Standaard Wetteren (3)
30.	Spouwen-Mopertingen (4)	0–2	Tempo Overijse (4)
31.	Loyers (5)	1–0	Turnhout (3)
32.	Olympia Wijgmaal (4)	2–2 (3–1p)	Spy (5)
33.	Wolvertem (4)	4–1	Royal Aywaille (4)
34.	Entité Manageoise (5)	1–4	Oudenaarde (3)
35.	Witgoor Dessel (4)	2–1	Izegem (3)
36.	Entente Binchoise (4)	2–2 (1–4p)	Racing Club Mechelen (3)
37.	Eernegem (4)	1–2	Oosterzonen Oosterwijk (3)
38.	Rupel Boom (3)	2–0	Osta Meerbeke (6)
39.	Gent-Zeehaven (3)	2–1	Givry (4)
40.	Union La Calamine (3)	4–0	Hannutois (6)
41.	Longlier (4)	0–3	Woluwe-Zaventem (3)
42.	Royal Spa (4)	1–1 (4–5p)	Bocholter (3)
43.	Sporting Hasselt (3)	5–0	Excelsior Kaart (5)
44.	Olympia Sterrebeek (4)	2–1	De Liege (4)
45.	Verbroedering Dender Hekelgem (3)	1–0	Tilleur-Saint-Gilles (5)
46.	Lebbeke (5)	0–3	Ronse (4)

== Fourth round ==
These round of matches were played on 17 & 18 August 2013.

Tie no	Home team (tier)	Score	Away team (tier)
1.	Tempo Overijse (4)	3–0	La Roche (5)
2.	Duffel (4)	3–2	Witgoor Dessel (4)
3.	Allemaal Samen Verbroedering Geel (2)	2–0	Menen (4)
4.	Tournai (3)	0–2	Westerlo (2)
5.	Dessel Sport (2)	1–0	Zwarte Leeuw (4)
6.	Hoogstraten (2)	0–1	Wolvertem (4)
7.	Grand-Leez (5)	0–5	Roeselare (2)
8.	Olympia Wijgmaal (4)	2–4 (a.e.t.)	Géants Athois (3)
9.	Sporting Club Aalst (2)	2–4	Temse (3)
10.	Olympia Sterrebeek (4)	1–3 (a.e.t.)	Olympic Molensport Ingelmunster (4)
11.	Sint-Eloois-Winkel (4)	1–1 (4–5p)	Eupen (2)
12.	Sint-Niklaas (3)	1–1 (1–4p)	Wallonia Walhain (4)
13.	Sint-Truidense (2)	1–2	Excelsior Leopoldsburg (4)
14.	Lommel United (2)	1–0	Sprimont-Comblian (3)
15.	Verviers (3)	4–4 (7–6p)	Ronse (4)
16.	Union Royale Namur (4)	1–4	Royal White Star Bruxelles (2)

Tie no	Home team (tier)	Score	Away team (tier)
17.	Coxyde (3)	2–2 (5–4p)	Racing White Daring Molenbeek Brussels (2)
18.	Woluwe-Zaventem (3)	2–3 (a.e.t.)	Westhoek (4)
19.	Esperanza Neerpelt (4)	1–2	Verbroedering Dender Hekelgem (3)
20.	Eendracht Zele (4)	1–1 (4–2p)	Virton (2)
21.	Tubize (2)	4–1	Gent-Zeehaven (3)
22.	Union La Calamine (3)	0–1	Royal Mouscron-Péruwelz (2)
23.	Union Saint-Gilloise (3)	1–1 (3–5p)	Oosterzonen Oosterwijk (3)
24.	Oudenaarde (3)	5–4 (a.e.t.)	Patro Eisden Maasmechelen (3)
25.	Rupel Boom (3)	1–1 (4–5p)	Vigor Wuitens Hamme (3)
26.	Standaard Wetteren (3)	0–2	Visé (2)
27.	Heist (2)	3–1	Gullegem (4)
28.	Loyers (5)	0–2	Deinze (3)
29.	Wallonne Ciney (3)	6–0	Grimbergen (3)
30.	Royal Antwerp (2)	0–1	Bocholter (3)
31.	Racing Club Mechelen (3)	2–0	Sporting Hasselt (3)
32.	La Louvière Centre (3)	1–3	Boussu Dour Borinage (2)

== Fifth round ==
These round of matches were played on 24 & 25 August 2013.

Tie no	Home team (tier)	Score	Away team (tier)
1.	Tempo Overijse (4)	2–0	Racing Club Mechelen (3)
2.	Wolvertem (4)	2–1 (a.e.t.)	Olympic Molensport Ingelmunster (4)
3.	Verbroedering Dender Hekelgem (3)	0–2	Oosterzonen Oosterwijk (3)
4.	Westerlo (2)	2–1	Wallonne Ciney (3)
5.	Deinze (3)	2–3 (a.e.t.)	Westhoek (4)
6.	Royal Mouscron-Péruwelz (2)	2–2 (5–6p)	Lommel United (2)
7.	Excelsior Leopoldsburg (4)	0–1	Oudenaarde (3)
8.	Visé (2)	4–1	Heist (2)

Tie no	Home team (tier)	Score	Away team (tier)
9.	Boussu Dour Borinage (2)	4–2	Wallonia Walhain (4)
10.	Vigor Wuitens Hamme (3)	2–1 (a.e.t.)	Eendracht Zele (4)
11.	Duffel (4)	1–3	Tubize (2)
12.	Bocholter (3)	1–2	Eupen (2)
13.	Coxyde (3)	3–4 (a.e.t.)	Géants Athois (3)
14.	Roeselare (2)	1–0	Verviers (3)
15.	Royal White Star Bruxelles (2)	3–1	Dessel Sport (2)
16.	Temse (3)	1–2 (a.e.t.)	Allemaal Samen Verbroedering Geel (2)

== Final Stages ==
=== Bracket ===
Round of 32
Oostende	5
Ath (3)	1
Lommel United (2)	2
Lierse	3
Mechelen	5
Boussu Dour (2)	1
Genk	3
Tubize (2)	1
Westerlo (2)	1 (4) pen.
Mons	1 (3)
Anderlecht	7
Eupen (2)	0
Roeselare (2)	1
Waasland-Beveren	5
ASV Geel (2)	0
Lokeren	1
Gent	4
Oosterzonen (3)	0
Visé (2)	0
OH Leuven	2
Overijse (4)	0
Kortrijk	1
Oudenaarde (3)	0
Club Brugge	1
Charleroi	1
Westhoek (4)	0
Hamme (3)	1
Zulte Waregem	2
Wolvertem (4)	0
Cercle Brugge	3
WS Brussels (2)	0
Standard Liège	4

Round of 16
Oostende	0 (8) pen.
Lierse	0 (7)
Mechelen	1
Genk	2
Westerlo (2)	2 (4) pen.
Anderlecht	2 (3)
Waasland-Beveren	1
Lokeren	3
Gent	3
OH Leuven	0
Kortrijk	1 aet
Club Brugge	0
Charleroi	0
Zulte Waregem	3
Cercle Brugge	1
Standard Liège	0

Quarterfinals
Oostende	0	1 aet	1
Genk	0	0	0
Westerlo (2)	0	2	2
Lokeren	1	4	5
Gent	1	0	1 (5) pen.
Kortrijk	0	1	1 (4)
Zulte Waregem	1	2	3 a.g.
Cercle Brugge	0	3	3

Semifinals
Oostende	1	1	2 (8) pen.
Lokeren	1	1	2 (9)
Gent	0	0	0
Zulte Waregem	1	0	1

Final
Lokeren	1
Zulte Waregem	0

=== Round 6 ===
The draw for round 6 was made on 28 August 2013 and the matches took place on 25 September 2013. The 16 teams from the Belgian Pro League entered at this stage, and each will play one of the 16 winners from the previous round.

25 September 2013	Oostende	5–1	Ath (3)	Ostend
20:15 CEST	Depoitre 15', 56'; Berrier 66'; Foket 82'; Wilmet 84'		Sakanoko 33'	Stadium: Albertpark

25 September 2013	Genk	3–1	Tubize (2)	Genk
20:00 CEST	Vossen 59' (pen.), 85'; Ojo 66'		Lonsana 31'	Stadium: Cristal Arena

25 September 2013	Mechelen	3–0	Boussu Dour (2)	Mechelen
20:00 CEST	Biset 35'; Diabang 60', 87'; Cordaro 64'; Prodell 88'		Koffi 59'	Stadium: Argosstadion Achter de Kazerne

25 September 2013	Westerlo (2)	1–1 (a.e.t.) (4–3 p)	Mons	Westerlo
20:00 CEST	Cools 9'		Arbeitman 69'	Stadium: Het Kuipje
	Penalties
	Paulussen (penalty scored); Lecomte (penalty missed); Trenson (penalty scored); Geudens (penalty scored); Maertens (penalty missed); Kennedy (penalty scored)		(penalty scored) Angeli; (penalty scored) Matthys; (penalty missed) Arbeitman; (penalty missed) Lorenzi; (penalty scored) De Belder; (penalty missed) Sapina

25 September 2013	Anderlecht	7–0	Eupen (2)	Brussels
20:00 CEST	Bruno 6' (pen.), 52'; De Zeeuw 26'; Acheampong 36'; Suárez 42'; Tielemans 49'; Cyriac 74'			Stadium: Constant Vanden Stock Stadium,

25 September 2013	Roeselare (2)	1–5	Waasland-Beveren	Roeselare
20:00 CEST	Di Lallo 23'		Veselinović 6', 27'; Oumarou 13'; Henkens 14'; Tričkovski 71'	Stadium: Schiervelde Stadion

25 September 2013	ASV Geel (2)	0–1	Lokeren	Geel
20:00 CEST			Marić 57'	Stadium: De Leunen

25 September 2013	Tempo Overijse (4)	0–1	Kortrijk	Overijse
20:00 CEST			Santini 71'	Stadium: Begijnhofstadion

25 September 2013	Gent	4–0	Oosterzonen Oosterwijk (3)	Ghent
20:00 CEST	Lepoint 45+11'; Soumahoro 56'; Privat 87'; Neto 89'			Stadium: Ghelamco Arena

25 September 2013	Visé (2)	0–2	OH Leuven	Visé
20:00 CEST			Ruytinx 54'; Messoudi 57' (pen.)	Stadium: Stade de la Cité de l'Oie

25 September 2013	Hamme (3)	1–2	Zulte Waregem	Hamme
20:00 CEST	Quintelier 38'		Cacérès 69'; Habibou 80'	Stadium: Gemeentelijk Stadion Vigor Wuitens Hamme

25 September 2013	Charleroi	1–0	Westhoek (4)	Charleroi
20:00 CEST	Kebano 39'			Stadium: Stade du Pays de Charleroi

25 September 2013	Wolvertem (4)	0–3	Cercle Brugge	Wolvertem
20:00 CEST			Van Eenoo 49'; Kabananga 79'; Staelens 82'	Stadium: Frans Lathouwersstadion

25 September 2013	Lommel United (2)	2–3	Lierse	Lommel
20:30 CEST	Vanaken 26'; Gano 49'		Vercauteren 27'; Watt 82'; Ghaly 89'	Stadium: Soevereinstadion

25 September 2013	WS Brussels (2)	0–4	Standard Liège	Woluwe-Saint-Lambert
20:30 CEST			M'Poku 5' (pen.); Ezekiel 34'; Ghoochannejhad 45+1'; Biton 85'	Stadium: Stade Fallon

25 September 2013	Oudenaarde (3)	0–1	Club Brugge	Oudenaarde
20:45 CEST			Jørgensen 59'	Stadium: Burgemeester Thienpontstadion

=== Round 7 ===
The draw for round 7 was made on 28 August 2013 and the matches took place on 4 December 2013.

4 December 2013	Oostende	0–0 (a.e.t.) (8–7 p)	Lierse	Ostend
20:00 CET				Stadium: Albertpark
	Penalties
	Canesin (penalty scored); Berrier (penalty scored); Brillant (penalty scored); Brouckaert (penalty scored); Siani (penalty scored); Mushekwi (penalty scored); De Schutter (penalty scored); Schmisser (penalty scored)		(penalty scored) Losada; (penalty scored) Swinkels; (penalty scored) Farag; (penalty scored) Wils; (penalty scored) Hoefkens; (penalty scored) Menga; (penalty scored) De Jonghe; (penalty missed) Lambot

4 December 2013	Mechelen	1–2	Genk	Mechelen
20:00 CET	de Witte 68' (pen.)		Kumordzi 13'; Hyland 90+1'	Stadium: Argosstadion Achter de Kazerne

4 December 2013	Charleroi	0–3	Zulte Waregem	Charleroi
20:00 CET			Habibou 13'; Kums 50'; Colpaert 60'	Stadium: Stade du Pays de Charleroi

4 December 2013	Cercle Brugge	1–0	Standard Liège	Bruges
20:00 CET	Smolders 83' (pen.)			Stadium: Jan Breydel Stadium

4 December 2013	Westerlo (2)	2–2 (a.e.t.) (4–3 p)	Anderlecht	Westerlo
20:30 CET	MacDonald 7'; Trossard 101'		Bruno 48', 107'	Stadium: Het Kuipje
	Penalties
	Trenson (penalty scored); Vanthournout (penalty scored); Kennedy (penalty scored); Rentmeister (penalty missed); MacDonald (penalty scored)		(penalty scored) Praet; (penalty scored) Kljestan; (penalty scored) Bruno; (penalty missed) Milivojević; (penalty missed) Mitrović

4 December 2013	Waasland-Beveren	1–3	Lokeren	Beveren
20:30 CET	Maman 69'		Bojović 14' (o.g.); Dutra 31'; De Pauw 34'	Stadium: Freethiel Stadion

4 December 2013	Gent	3–0	OH Leuven	Ghent
20:30 CET	Pedersen 38' (pen.); Neto 58'; Privat 70'			Stadium: Ghelamco Arena

4 December 2013	Kortrijk	1–0 (a.e.t.)	Club Brugge	Kortrijk
20:45 CET	Santini 98'			Stadium: Guldensporen Stadion

=== Quarter-finals ===
The draw for the quarterfinals took place together with the draw for rounds 6 and 7 on 25 September 2013. The matches will be played over two legs on 18 December 2013 (leg 1) and 15 January 2014 (leg 2).

==== First legs ====
18 December 2013	Genk	0–0	Oostende	Genk
20:00 CET				Stadium: Cristal Arena

18 December 2013	Westerlo (2)	0–1	Lokeren	Westerlo
20:00 CET			Dutra 53'	Stadium: Het Kuipje

18 December 2013	Zulte Waregem	1–0	Cercle Brugge	Waregem
20:00 CET	De Fauw 7'			Stadium: Regenboogstadion

18 December 2013	Gent	1–0	Kortrijk	Ghent
20:45 CET	Soumahoro 85'			Stadium: Ghelamco Arena

==== Second legs ====
14 January 2014	Kortrijk	1–0 (a.e.t.) (1–1 agg.) (4–5 p)	Gent	Kortrijk
20:45 CET	Raman 33'			Stadium: Guldensporen Stadion; Referee: Serge Gumienny
	Penalties
	De Smet (penalty scored); Chanot (penalty scored); Matton (penalty missed); Raman (penalty scored); Heylen (penalty scored); Petrović (penalty missed)		(penalty scored) Neto; (penalty scored) El Ghanassy; (penalty missed) Soumahoro; (penalty scored) Pedersen; (penalty scored) Habibou; (penalty scored) Van der Bruggen

15 January 2014	Cercle Brugge	3–2 (3–3 agg.)	Zulte Waregem	Bruges
20:00 CET	Naudts 30'; A. Staelens 87'; Kabananga 90+4'		Bongonda 41'; Hazard 57'	Stadium: Jan Breydel Stadium

15 January 2014	Lokeren	4–2 (5–2 agg.)	Westerlo (2)	Lokeren
20:30 CET	Vanaken 64'; Marić 69' (pen.); Dutra 70'; Trompet 87'		Cools 49'; Paulussen 53' (pen.)	Stadium: Daknamstadion; Referee: Bart Vertenten

15 January 2014	Oostende	1–0 (a.e.t.) (1–0 agg.)	Genk	Ostend
20:45 CET	Siani 95'			Stadium: Albertpark; Referee: Sebastien Delferiere

=== Semi-finals ===
The matches will be played over two legs on 27 & 28 January 2014 (leg 1) and 5 February 2014 (leg 2).

==== First legs ====
28 January 2014	Lokeren	1–1	Oostende	Lokeren
20:45 CET	Harbaoui 63'		Mushekwi 18'	Stadium: Daknamstadion

29 January 2014	Gent	0–1	Zulte Waregem	Ghent
20:45 CET		Report	Pourié 62'	Stadium: Ghelamco Arena; Attendance: 9,960; Referee: Sébastien Delferière

==== Second legs ====
5 February 2014	Oostende	1–1 (a.e.t.) (2–2 agg.) (8–9 p)	Lokeren	Ostend
20:45 CET	Depoitre 24'		Harbaoui 3'	Stadium: Albertpark
	Penalties
	Berrier (penalty scored); Jali (penalty scored); Schmisser (penalty scored); Wilmet (penalty scored); Siani (penalty missed); Hempte (penalty scored); Brillant (penalty scored); Mushekwi (penalty scored); De Schutter (penalty scored); Depoitre (penalty missed)		Patosi (penalty missed); Mertens (penalty scored); Scholz (penalty scored); Persoons (penalty scored); Harbaoui (penalty scored); Overmeire (penalty scored); Galitsios (penalty scored); Odoi (penalty scored); Kaya (penalty scored); Ansah (penalty scored)

5 February 2014	Zulte Waregem	0–0 (1–0 agg.)	Gent	Waregem
20:45 CET				Stadium: Regenboogstadion

== Final ==
22 March 2014
20:30 CET

Lokeren	1–0	Zulte Waregem
Scholz 57'	Report

King Baudouin Stadium, Brussels
Attendance: 40,000
Referee: Luc Wouters

== See also ==
- 2013–14 Belgian Pro League
