= Denis Odoi =

Ghanaian footballer (born 1988)

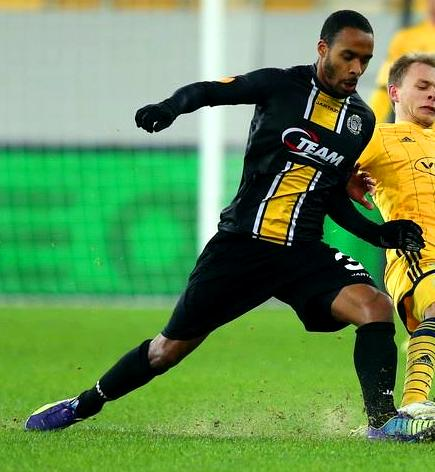
- Odoi playing for Lokeren in 2014

Personal information
- Full name: Denis Frimpong Odoi
- Date of birth: 27 May 1988 (age 38)
- Place of birth: Leuven, Belgium
- Height: 1.78 m (5 ft 10 in)
- Position: Full-back

Team information
- Current team: Club NXT
- Number: 96

Senior career*
Years	Team	Apps	(Gls)
2006–2009	OH Leuven	58	(3)
2009–2011	Sint-Truiden	70	(2)
2011–2013	Anderlecht	33	(0)
2013–2016	Lokeren	109	(2)
2016–2022	Fulham	151	(4)
2022–2024	Club Brugge	67	(3)
2024–2025	Royal Antwerp	28	(1)
2025–2026	NAC Breda	19	(0)
2026–	Club NXT	0	(0)

International career^{‡}
2008	Belgium U20	1	(0)
2010	Belgium U21	3	(0)
2012	Belgium	1	(0)
2022–2024	Ghana	14	(0)
- * Club domestic league appearances and goals as of 21 May 2026 ‡ National team caps and goals as of 25 February 2026

Denis Frimpong Odoi (born 27 May 1988) is a professional footballer who plays as a defender for Challenger Pro League side Club NXT. A right-footed full-back who can play on both sides, he is nicknamed the Professor because of his maturity and discipline on the field of play. Born in Belgium, and a one-time representative of the Belgium national team, he represented the Ghana national team.

== Club career ==
=== Oud-Heverlee Leuven ===
Born in Leuven, Belgium, Odoi began playing football when he was five years old, leading to join K. Stade Leuven and played there for five years. When Odoi was ten years old, he moved to join Anderlecht. However, Odoi said: "When I was almost eleven, Anderlecht came to get me. That was great, but the transfers from Kessel-Lo, where I live, to Anderlecht and back were not without obstacles, I remember. Traveling went a lot smoother when Genk incorporated me a few years later." During his time at Genk, he met Steven Defour and became good friends with him. After a year spent at Genk, Odoi joined Oud-Heverlee Leuven when he was eighteen years old and joined the club, citing "a lot more chance to play there".

Odoi progressed through the ranks at Oud-Heverlee Leuven and played for a reserve team for two years. Following this, he was promoted to the first team and made his Oud-Heverlee Leuven debut on 28 April 2007 against Royal Antwerp, starting a match and played 80 minutes before being substituted, in a 1–0 win. Odoi went on to make four appearances for the club. At the start of the 2007–08 season, Odoi appeared in the first two matches before being substituted at half time during a 2–1 loss against Tubize on 30 August 2007and didn't play for two months. It wasn't until on 14 October 2007 when he returned to the starting line–up, in a 4–0 win against K.V. Kortrijk. Odoi's return was short–lived when he played 71 minutes before being substituted, in a 4–0 loss against Overpelt-Lommel and didn't play for the next four matches. He then returned to the starting line–up against Eupen on 18 November 2007, playing the whole game, in a 2–0 win. Since returning to the starting line–up, Odoi became a first team regular for the side. In the Round of 16 of Beker Van Belgie against Germinal Beerschot, he played 120 minutes and missed a penalty in the shootout, resulting in Oud-Heverlee Leuven's elimination. Despite facing suspensions and injury, Odoi continued to remain in the first team for the rest of the 2007–08 season. At the end of the 2007–08 season, he went on to make twenty–four appearances in all competitions.

At the start of the 2008–09 season, Odoi continued to remain in the first team for Oud-Heverlee Leuven. He then scored two goals in two matches between 13 September 2008 and 21 September 2008 against K.V. Red Star Waasland and Olympic Club Charleroi Farciennes. Odoi started in every match until he was suspended for one match for picking up five yellow cards. Odoi returned to the starting line–up against Eupen on 22 November 2008 and helped the side win 2–1. However, his return was short–lived when he was once again suspended. Since returning from suspended, Odoi continued to regain his first team place for the side. It wasn't until on 1 April 2009 when he scored his third goal of the season, in a 2–1 loss against R.F.C. Tournai. At the end of the 2008–09 season, Odoi went on to make thirty–five appearances and scoring three times in all competitions.

=== Sint-Truiden ===
In July 2009, Odoi left Oud-Heverlee Leuven to join Sint-Truiden, signing a three–year contract with the club.

Odoi made his Sint-Truiden debut, starting the whole game, in a 2–2 draw against Standard Liège in the opening game of the season. He then started in the next matches for the side, playing in the left–back position. This lasted until Odoi received a red card for a second bookable offence in the 83rd minute, in a 1–0 win against K.V. Kortrijk on 19 September 2009. After serving a one match suspension, he returned to the starting line–up, in a 1–0 win against Westerlo on 26 September 2009. Once again, Odoi was sent–off for the second time this season, for a straight red card in the 82nd minute, losing 4–1 against Germinal Beerschot on 7 November 2009. After serving a one match suspension, he returned to the starting line–up, and helped Sint-Truiden kept a clean sheet, in a 2–0 win against Standard Liège on 29 November 2009. Despite being suspended twice, Odoi continued to regain his first team place for the side, rotating in the left–back position and midfield position. Despite facing suspension, he helped Sint-Truiden finished fifth place to qualify for the Championship play–offs. During a 3–1 loss against Cercle Brugge on 21 March 2010, Odoi was subjected of ‘Odoi janet' chant from the supporters of the opposition team. Odoi helped the side finish fourth place in the Championship play–offs, resulting in them qualifying for the Testmatches Europa League. However, in the Testmatches Europa League, he played in both legs against Genk, as Sint-Truiden lost 5–3 on aggregate. At the end of the 2009–10 season, Odoi made thirty–nine appearances in all competitions.

Ahead of the 2010–11 season, Odoi was linked a move away from Sint-Truiden, as Standard Liège wanted to sign him. But he ended the transfer speculation by signing a five-year deal, keeping him until 2015. At the start of the 2010–11 season, Odoi kept two clean sheets between 20 August 2010 and 28 August 2010 against Standard Liège and K.V. Mechelen. Since the start of the 2010–11 season, he continued to regain his first team place, rotating in the defender and midfield positions. This lasted until Odoi was sent–off for a second bookable offence, in a 3–0 loss against Zulte Waregem on 6 November 2010. After serving a one match suspension, he continued to remain involved in the first team for the side. His performance continued to attract interests from clubs, both from Belgium and outside Belgium, but ended up staying at Sint-Truiden. However, in a 2–0 loss against Anderlecht on 5 February 2011, he was sent–off for another second bookable offence and said his fourth red card since joining the club was 'the darkest day of his life'. After serving a one match suspension, Odoi returned to the starting line–up against Charleroi on 19 February 2011, as Sint-Truiden lost 1–0. After being suspended for the third time this season, he returned to the starting line–up against Cercle Brugge on 9 April 2011, as the club drew 1–1. Odoi then scored his first goal of the season, as well as, setting up Sint-Truiden's second goal of the game, in a 2–1 win against K.V. Mechelen. At the end of the 2010–11 season, Odoi made thirty–four appearances and scoring once in all competitions. For his performance, he was awarded by the club's supporters for Player of the Season and the club's Team of the Year.

=== Anderlecht ===
Following a transfer speculation over his future at Sint-Truiden, it was announced on 29 April 2011 that Odoi joined Anderlecht, signing a four–year contract for a reported 1.5 million euros transfer fee. Upon joining the club, he said: "When I started playing football as a little boy it was never really the intention to become a professional and look where I am now. I already played with the youth in Anderlecht and then left of my own accord, because the chance to make the first team was not really realistic at the time. I hope to have a chance now." Odoi also rejected a move from Standard Liège in favour of joining Anderlecht, which he later revealed that Roland Duchâtelet was the reason of his refusal to join Standard Liège.

Odoi made his Anderlecht debut in the opening game of the season against former club, Oud-Heverlee Leuven, where he started the match, only to be sent–off in the 33rd minute for professional foul, as they lost 2–1. Following the match the club unsuccessfully appealed his sending off, a three match suspension. He then played in both legs of the UEFA Europa League Play–Offs Round against Bursaspor, as the club won 4–3 on aggregate to progress to the group stage. After serving a three match suspension, Odoi returned to the starting line–up against Gent on 18 September 2011 and helped the side keep a clean sheet, in a 1–0 win. Since returning to the first team from suspension, Odoi found himself in a competition with Marcin Wasilewski over the right–back position and Guillaume Gillet over the left–back position. As a result, he found himself in and out of the starting line–up, resulting in him being placed at the substitute bench. Manager Ariël Jacobs evaluated his performance in February, saying: "I'm not in the habit of talking about individual performance, but I do in the case of Denis. I think he played a good game. He played with little nerves and like the Odoi we always know: defend when necessary, try to participate in the game when possible. He's also grown in the game." By April, Odoi received more playing time, as he helped Anderlecht win the league. Despite suffering from injury later in the 2011–12 season, Odoi went on to make twenty–six appearances in all competitions.

At the start of the 2012–13 season, Odoi started the season well when he helped Anderlecht beat Lokeren 3–2 to win the Belgium Super Cup. Odoi became a first team regular for the side in the first month to the season. He then played a role, assisting four times: which one occurred in the UEFA Champions League third round in both legs against FK Ekranas, and another one in the league against Cercle Brugge and RAEC Mons. This lasted until Odoi suffered a shoulder injury that kept him out for two months. It wasn't until on 3 November 2012 when he returned to the first team from injury, coming on as a 77th-minute substitute, in a 4–1 win against Mechelen. Since returning to the first team, Odoi found himself placed on the substitute bench throughout the 2012–13 season. As a result, he was expected to leave Anderlecht at the January transfer window but ended up staying at the club. It wasn't until on 16 January 2013 when Odoi made his return to the starting line–up against Gent in the second leg of the Beker Van Belgie quarter–finals, winning 1–0. However, in the second leg of the Beker Van Belgie semi–finals against Genk, he played throughout 120 minutes and missed the penalty in shootout, resulting in the club's elimination. By mid–March, Odoi made three starts for the side, playing in the right–back position. However, he was sent–off for a straight red card in the 32nd minute, in a 1–1 draw against Club Brugge on 14 April 2013. Following the match, Odoi served a one match suspension. On the last match of the Pro League play-off, he was not included in the squad, as the club drew 1–1 against title contender against Zulte Waregem, which gave Anderlecht the title. At the end of the 2012–13 season, Odoi made twenty–one appearances in all competitions.

=== Lokeren ===
Having put on sale by Anderlecht as part of the club's cost cutting, Odoi joined Lokeren on 18 June 2013, signing a four–year contract. The move was officially confirmed on 21 June 2013. Upon joining the club, he said that his time at Anderlecht didn't work out for him.

Odoi made his Lokeren debut, starting the whole game, in a 3–2 win against his former club, Anderlecht in the opening game of the season. Since making his debut for the club, he quickly established himself in the starting eleven, playing in the left–back position. Odoi also rotated in playing in the midfield position. He helped Lokeren keep two consecutive clean sheets between 31 August 2013 and 14 September 2013 against Oostende and Cercle Brugge. Odoi, once again, helped Lokeren keep two consecutive clean sheets between 26 October 2013 and 30 October 2013 against Waasland-Beveren and nl. He then was in the left–back position by helping the club keep three clean sheets out of the five matches between 8 December 2013 and 18 January 2014. In the semi-finals of the Beker Van Belgie, Odoi played in both legs against Oostende and in the second leg, scored in the penalty shootout, as the club won 9–8 to advance in the final. However, in a match against his former club, Anderlecht on 21 February 2014, he scored an own goal in the 57th minute despite winning 2–1. Things got worse for Odoi in a follow–up match against K.V. Mechelen when he was sent–off in the 40th minute for a professional foul, in a 1–0 loss on 28 February 2014. Initially suspended for three matches, Odoi's suspension was reduced to two. After serving a two match suspension, Odoi returned to the starting line–up in the final against Zulte Waregem, starting the whole game and helped Lokeren win 1–0 to win the tournament. In a follow–up match against Club Brugge, he scored his first goal for the club, as they lost 5–1. Odoi later helped Lokeren finish fifth place in the Championship play–off. Despite being suspended twice during the 2013–14 season, Odoi went on to make forty–three appearances and scoring once in all competitions.

At the start of the 2014–15 season, Odoi started in Belgian Super Cup against Anderlecht, where he set up a goal for Hamdi Harbaoui but scored an own goal at the last minute, resulting Lokeren losing 2–1. Odoi then set up two goals in two matches between 8 August 2014 and 16 August 2014 against Genk and Lierse. He played in both leg of the UEFA Europa League Play–Off Round against Hull City, as they drew 2–2 on aggregate, eventually going through to the group stage, thanks to away goal. Since the start of the 2014–15 season, Odoi continued to establish himself in the first team, playing in the left–back position. At times, he did rotate into playing in the right–back position. Odoi played all six matches of the league's Group Stage playoffs for the UEFA Europa League spot and helped Lokeren finish at the top of the table. He played in both legs of the league's playoffs for the UEFA Europa League spot against K.V. Mechelen, as the club lost 4–3 on aggregate. Despite missing one match during the 2014–15 season, Odoi went on to make fifty appearances in all competitions.

At the start of the 2015–16 season, Odoi continued to establish himself in the first team, playing in the left–back position. At times, he did rotate into playing in the right–back position. Odoi helped Lokeren two clean sheets in two matches between 8 August 2015 and 15 August 2015 against K.V. Kortrijk and Mechelen. In a match against Oud-Heverlee Leuven on 13 February 2016, he scored his first goal of the season, only to be sent–off in the 83rd minute for a professional foul, as the club drew 3–3. After the match, Odoi was given a two match suspension, only to be rescinded. Two weeks later on 26 February 2016 against Gent, he captained Lokeren for the first time in his career, as they lost 3–1. Odoi then featured five out of the six matches in the league's Group Stage playoffs for the UEFA Europa League spot, as the club finished second Charleroi through goal differences. At the end of the 2015–16 season, he made thirty–seven appearances and scoring once in all competitions.

Four years later after leaving Lokeren, Odoi reflected on his time at the club, upon learning about their liquidation, saying: "That's really crazy. I'm not sure what to think. I didn't believe it would be okay for a while. I didn't follow it that well anymore, but when those first messages came, I called Koen Persoons. I am particularly sorry for Killian Overmeire. He really gave his whole life to that club. At a certain point he could also play higher football, but he remained loyal to Lokeren. He would also be there after his career. Have been given a role. But now he should not come down. I also think he wants to keep playing as high as possible. My best memory of Lokeren? Our semi-final in the cup against KV Oostende in 2014 and the final itself, of course. Then you had that European qualification against Hull. And the match in Legia Warsaw. I had little expectations in advance; but it was incredible. The atmosphere was great, the stadium was good, the hotel. We did lose, but I played that match well myself."

=== Fulham ===
On 14 July 2016, it was announced that Odoi had signed for then-English Championship side Fulham for an undisclosed fee, signing a three-year contract with an option of a further 12 months. Upon joining the club, he was given a number four shirt for the side.

==== 2016–17 season ====
On 5 August 2016, Odoi made his debut for Fulham in a 1–0 win against Newcastle United – his debut drawing acclaim for his "outrageous display of skill" controlling the ball off of his back shoulder. Since making his debut for the club, he established himself in the first team, playing in the right–back position for the first two months to the 2016–17 season. Odoi then set up the equalising goal for Tom Cairney, in a 1–1 draw against Nottingham Forest on 27 September 2016. After being dropped to the substitute bench for two matches, he returned to the first team, coming on as a 76th-minute substitute, in a 1–1 draw against Sheffield Wednesday on 19 November 2016. Odoi then found himself in and out of the starting line–up, as he competed with Ryan Fredericks over the right–back position. Odoi then scored his first goal for Fulham in a 3–2 win against Wigan Athletic on 11 February 2017. His second goal for the club came on 18 March 2017, in a 3–1 loss against Wolverhampton Wanderers. However, he suffered an injury that saw him miss five matches. It wasn't until on 22 April 2017 when Odoi returned to the first team, coming on as a second-half substitute, in a 4–1 win against Huddersfield Town. At the end of the 2016–17 season, he went on to make thirty–two appearances and scored twice in all competitions.

==== 2017–18 season ====
In the summer of 2017, Odoi nearly signed for Gent but stayed on an improved contract following intervention from the Fulham chairman's son. At the start of the 2017–18 season, he scored his first goal of the season, in a 2–0 win against Wycombe Wanderers in the first round of the League Cup. Since the start of the 2017–18 season, Odoi continued to establish himself in the starting eleven for the side, playing in various defending positions. Around the same time, he also rotated to the substitute bench as well. Odoi then scored his second goal of the season, in a 2–2 draw against Preston North End on 14 October 2017. However, in a match against rivals, Brentford on 2 December 2017, he was sent–off for a second bookable offence, as they lost 3–1. After not playing for the next three matches due to serving a one match suspension and rotation, Odoi returned to the starting line–up against Cardiff City on 26 December 2017 and helped Fulham win 4–2. He then helped the club keep two clean sheets in two matches between 13 January 2018 and 20 January 2018 against Middlesbrough and Burton Albion. In a match against rivals, Queens Park Rangers on 17 March 2018, he was at fault after "conceding possession to allow Paweł Wszołek levelled with a composed finish", resulting a 2–2 draw. Odoi, once again, helped the club keep four clean sheets in two matches between 30 March 2018 and 10 April 2018 against Norwich City, Leeds United, Sheffield Wednesday and Reading.

Since returning to the first team in late–December, Odoi regained his first team and continued to play in various defending positions.

On 14 May 2018, he scored the winning goal as Fulham beat Derby County to reach the 2018 EFL Championship play-off final. In the play-off final against Aston Villa, Odoi started the match and played 70 minutes before being sent–off for a second bookable offence, as the club won 1–0 to gain promotion to the Premier League. At the end of the 2017–18 season, he made forty–three appearances and scored three times in all competitions. Following this, Odoi was awarded for his outstanding contribution in his role as the Foundation's Official Schools Ambassador.

==== 2018–19 season ====
Having served the first two league matches of the 2018–19 season, Odoi made his Premier League debut, starting the whole game, in a 4–2 win against Burnley on 26 August 2018. Since returning from suspension, he continued to establish himself in the starting eleven for the side, playing in the centre–back position. Odoi also rotated in playing in the right–back position on four occasions by the end of the first half to the season. He scored his first goal of the season, coming against Oldham Athletic on 6 January 2019 in the third round of the FA Cup, as Fulham lost 2–1. By February, Odoi then began too play in the right–back position, due to both Claudio Ranieri and Scott Parker prefer to pick Maxime Le Marchand, Tim Ream and Håvard Nordtveit. Despite this, Fulham were relegated to the Championship after losing 4–1 against Watford on 2 April 2019. However, in a 1–0 win against Cardiff City on 27 April 2019, he suffered a concussion after accidentally being kicked in the head by his team-mate Le Marchand, resulting in him taken off on a stretcher in the 28th minute. Following this, Odoi was sidelined for the rest of the 2018–19 season. At the end of the 2018–19 season, Odoi went on to make thirty–four appearances and scoring once in all competitions.

==== 2019–20 season ====
Ahead of the 2019–20 season, Fulham opted to take up their option of a contract extension that would ensure Odoi remained under contract for the 2019–20 season. He started in the first two league matches before suffering a knee injury that kept him out for a month. Odoi returned from injury, coming on as a late substitute, in a 1–1 draw against West Bromwich Albion on 14 September 2019. Since returning from injury, he regained his first team place, playing in the right–back position for three months despite competing with Steven Sessegnon and Cyrus Christie. This lasted until Odoi was sent–off for a straight red card in the 28th minute, in a 3–1 loss against Preston North End on 10 December 2019. After serving a three match suspension, he returned to the first team, coming on as a 67th-minute substitute, in a 1–0 win against Stoke City on 29 December 2019. Odoi then helped the club keep three consecutive clean sheets between 11 January 2020 and 22 January 2020 against Hull City, Middlesbrough and Charlton Athletic. He did once again by helping Fulham keep two sheets in two matches between 26 February 2020 and 29 February 2020 against Swansea City and Preston North End. Odoi continued as a first-team regular, and by the time the season was suspended because of the COVID-19 pandemic, he had made 26 league appearances.

Odoi remained an integral part of the team once the season resumed behind closed doors, and helped Fulham keep three out four clean sheets between 4 July 2020 and 14 July 2020 against Birmingham City, Nottingham Forest and West Bromwich Albion.

In the EFL Championship play-off final against Brentford, he played 110 minutes, as Fulham won 2–1 to help the side reach the Premier League once again.

At the end of the 2019–20 season, Odoi had made thirty–nine appearances in all competitions.

==== 2020–21 season ====
On 8 September 2020, he signed a contract extension, keeping him at Craven Cottage until 2023.

=== Club Brugge ===
On 1 February 2022, Odoi joined Belgian First Division A side Club Brugge KV for an undisclosed fee.

=== Antwerp ===
On 25 June 2024, Odoi signed a two-year contract with Royal Antwerp. However, he decided to terminate his contract with Antwerp in the summer of 2025.

=== NAC Breda ===
On 24 November 2025, Odoi signed a contract with Dutch side NAC Breda until the end of the 2025–26 season, with the club option to extend for an additional season. Six days later, he started the match against Excelsior Rotterdam, making him, at 37, the oldest player ever to debut in the Eredivisie.

=== Return to Club Brugge ===
On 27 July 2026, Odoi returned to Club Brugge, signing a one-season contract with their reserve team Club NXT.

== International career ==
=== Belgium ===
Odoi is eligible to play for Belgium (through his mother) and Ghana (through his father).

Odoi made his only Belgium U20 appearance, playing 45 minutes, in a 1–1 draw against Slovakia U20 on 25 March 2008. A year later, he was called up to the Belgium U21 for the first time but did not play. It wasn't until on 12 August 2010 when Odoi made his Belgium U21 debut, starting the whole game in the left–back position, in a 1–0 win against France U21. He went on to make three appearances for the U21 side.

Odoi was called up to the Belgium's senior team for the first time in February 2011 but did not play for the rest of the year. He made his senior Belgian debut on 25 May 2012, starting the whole game, in a 2–2 draw against Montenegro.

=== Ghana ===
Two years later, Odoi stated his intention to play for Ghana, saying: "Even if that was a practice match. I can still come out for Ghana. Playing for that country seems like the ideal way to discover my roots." He later become critical of Marc Wilmots for overlooking him for the Belgium squad. But in October 2018, Odoi changed his mind by stating that he wanted to earn a place in the Belgium national squad. He switched to represent Ghana in 2022, and debuted in a 0–0 2022 FIFA World Cup qualification tie with Nigeria on 25 March 2022.

In November 2022, Odoi was named in the Black Stars of Ghana squad for the 2022 FIFA World Cup in Qatar.

== Personal life ==
Outside of football, Odoi studied to become a physical education teacher and was studying that in college while working his way of becoming a professional footballer. In doing so, Odoi said in an interview with The Guardian that he received good grades at school.

Odoi is close friends with Napoli and Belgium striker Dries Mertens, having known each other since they were both five. However, at one point, Odoi revealed in the interview with The Guardian that he once tackled Mertens so seriously that he got "suspended from training for the rest of the week" and did not tell his parents, though it gave him "more time to do my homework." Growing up, Odoi watched Premier League and Serie A when he was a youngster and served to be an inspiration for him to play football.

In June 2017, Odoi married Katleen Thijs. Two years later, he became a father.

== Career statistics ==
=== Club ===
As of match played 17 August 2023

Appearances and goals by club, season and competition
Club	Season	League			National cup (Note: Includes Belgian Cup, FA Cup)		League cup (Note: Includes EFL Cup)		Europe		Other		Total	
Club	Season	Division	Apps	Goals	Apps	Goals	Apps	Goals	Apps	Goals	Apps	Goals	Apps	Goals
Oud-Heverlee Leuven	2008–09	Belgian Second Division	13	3	0	0	—		—		—		13	3
Sint-Truidense	2009–10	Belgian Pro League	37	1	2	0	—		—		—		39	1
Sint-Truidense	2010–11	Belgian Pro League	33	1	1	0	—		—		—		34	1
Sint-Truidense	Total		70	2	3	0	—		—		—		73	2
Anderlecht	2011–12	Belgian Pro League	19	0	2	0	—		5 (Note: Appearances in UEFA Europa League)	0	—		26	0
Anderlecht	2012–13	Belgian Pro League	14	0	2	0	—		4 (Note: Appearances in UEFA Champions League)	0	1 (Note: Appearance in Belgian Super Cup)	0	21	0
Anderlecht	Total		33	0	4	0	—		9	0	1	0	47	0
Lokeren	2013–14	Belgian Pro League	37	1	7	0	—		—		—		44	1
Lokeren	2014–15	Belgian Pro League	37	0	4	0	—		8	0	—		49	0
Lokeren	2015–16	Belgian Pro League	35	1	1	0	—		—		—		36	1
Lokeren	Total		109	2	12	0	—		8	0	—		129	2
Fulham	2016–17	Championship	30	2	3	0	0	0	—		—		33	2
Fulham	2017–18	Championship	38	1	1	0	1	1	—		2 (Note: Appearances in the EFL Championship play-offs)	1	42	3
Fulham	2018–19	Premier League	31	0	1	1	2	0	—		—		34	1
Fulham	2019–20	Championship	34	0	2	0	0	0	—		3	0	39	0
Fulham	2020–21	Premier League	3	0	1	0	3	0	—		—		7	0
Fulham	2021–22	Championship	15	1	0	0	0	0	—		—		15	1
Fulham	Total		151	4	8	1	6	1	—		5	1	170	7
Club Brugge	2021–22	Belgian Pro League	14	1	2	0	—		—		—		16	1
Club Brugge	2022–23	Belgian Pro League	29	0	1	0	—		7	0	1	0	38	0
Club Brugge	2023–24	Belgian Pro League	24	2	0	0	—		8 (Note: Appearances in UEFA Europa Conference League)	0	—		3	0
Club Brugge	2024–25	Belgian Pro League	28	1	0	0	—		2 (Note: Appearances in UEFA Europa Conference League)	0	—		3	0
Club Brugge	Total		44	1	3	0	—		9	0	1	0	57	1
NAC	2025–26	Eredivisie	1	0	0	0	—		—		—		1	0
Career total			420	12	30	1	6	1	26	0	7	1	489	15

== Honours ==
Anderlecht

- Belgian Pro League: 2011–12, 2012–13
- Belgian Super Cup: 2012

Lokeren

- Belgian Cup: 2013–14

Fulham

- EFL Championship: 2021–22; play-offs: 2018, 2020

Club Brugge

- Belgian Pro League: 2021–22
- Belgian Super Cup: 2022
