= 2014 Belgian Super Cup =

Anderlecht	Lokeren
2	1
- Date: 20 July 2014
- Venue: Constant Vanden Stock Stadium, Anderlecht
- Referee: Jonathan Lardot

The 2014 Belgian Super Cup was a football match played on 20 July 2014, between 2013–14 Belgian Pro League winners Anderlecht and 2013–14 Belgian Cup winners Lokeren, won by Anderlecht, winning their twelfth super cup.

Anderlecht had played in eighteen previous editions of the Belgian Super Cup, winning in 1985, 1987, 1993, 1995, 2000, 2001, 2006, 2007, 2010, 2012 and their most recent appearance in 2013. Lokeren had played in a Belgian Super Cup once before, two years previous in 2012, also facing Anderlecht and losing 3-2.

== Match ==
=== Details ===
20 July 2014
18:00 CEST

Anderlecht	2–1	Lokeren
Mitrović 29'; Odoi 90+1' (o.g.)	Report	Harbaoui 73'

Constant Vanden Stock Stadium, Anderlecht, Belgium
Referee: Jonathan Lardot

Anderlecht	Lokeren

RSC ANDERLECHT:
GK	13	(Belgium) Thomas Kaminski
DF	2	(France) Fabrice N'Sakala
DF	22	(Democratic Republic of the Congo) Chancel Mbemba
DF	14	(Netherlands) Bram Nuytinck
DF	3	(Belgium) Olivier Deschacht (c)
MF	18	(Ghana) Frank Acheampong	(yellow card) 52'
MF	31	(Belgium) Youri Tielemans
MF	8	(Serbia) Luka Milivojević
MF	10	(Belgium) Dennis Praet		(substituted off) 66'
FW	15	(Ivory Coast) Gohi Bi Cyriac	(yellow card) 44'	(substituted off) 85'
FW	45	(Serbia) Aleksandar Mitrović		(substituted off) 45'
Substitutes:
MF	7	(Honduras) Andy Najar		(substituted on) 66'
MF	9	(Argentina) Matías Suárez		(substituted on) 45'
MF	19	(United States) Sacha Kljestan
DF	24	(Belgium) Michaël Heylen
MF	32	(Belgium) Leander Dendoncker
GK	33	(Belgium) Davy Roef
FW	42	(Belgium) Nathan Kabasele		(substituted on) 85'
Manager:
(Albania) Besnik Hasi

LOKEREN:
GK	30	(Belgium) Davino Verhulst
DF	3	(Belgium) Denis Odoi
DF	5	(Switzerland) Mijat Marić
DF	4	(Belgium) Gregory Mertens
DF	6	(Brazil) Arthur Henrique
MF	7	(Belgium) Killian Overmeire (c)	(substituted off) 65'
MF	8	(Belgium) Koen Persoons
MF	19	(Brazil) Júnior Dutra
MF	20	(Belgium) Hans Vanaken
MF	14	(Belgium) Jordan Remacle	(substituted off) 86'
FW	9	(Tunisia) Hamdi Harbaoui
Substitutes:
MF	11	(Belgium) Onur Kaya	(substituted on) 77'
GK	12	(Serbia) Jugoslav Lazić
DF	13	(Greece) Georgios Galitsios
FW	23	(Ghana) Eugene Ansah	(substituted on) 86'
DF	25	(Belgium) Alexander Corryn
MF	26	(Belgium) Cedric Mingiedi
FW	29	(Belgium) Nill De Pauw	(substituted on) 65' (substituted off) 77'
Manager:
(Belgium) Peter Maes

== See also ==
- 2014–15 Belgian Pro League
- 2014–15 Belgian Cup
