= Jugoslav Lazić =

Serbian footballer

Personal information
- Full name: Jugoslav Lazić
- Date of birth: 12 December 1979 (age 46)
- Place of birth: Kruševac, SFR Yugoslavia
- Height: 1.97 m (6 ft 6 in)
- Position: Goalkeeper

Team information
- Current team: Zamalek SC (goalkeeping coach)

Senior career*
Years	Team	Apps	(Gls)
1997–2004	Napredak Kruševac	135	(0)
2004–2015	Lokeren	123	(0)
Total		258	(0)
- * Club domestic league appearances and goals

Jugoslav Lazić (Serbian Cyrillic: Југослав Лазић; born 12 December 1979) is a Serbian goalkeeping coach and retired footballer who played as a goalkeeper. He currently works as goalkeeping coach for Egyptian Premier League side Zamalek SC.

== Career ==
Lazić made his senior debut at his hometown club Napredak Kruševac in 1997. He spent seven seasons with the team, appearing for them in the 2000–01 UEFA Cup. In the summer of 2004, Lazić moved abroad to Belgian side Lokeren. He spent the following 11 years at the club, winning two national cups and announced his retirement in May 2015.

After retiring, he worked as goalkeeper coach at K.V. Mechelen.

== Career statistics ==
Club	Season	League	
Club	Season	Apps	Goals
Napredak Kruševac	1997–98	6	0
Napredak Kruševac	1998–99	1	0
Napredak Kruševac	1999–2000	12	0
Napredak Kruševac	2000–01	26	0
Napredak Kruševac	2001–02	33	0
Napredak Kruševac	2002–03	32	0
Napredak Kruševac	2003–04	25	0
Napredak Kruševac	Total	135	0

== Honours ==
Napredak Kruševac

- Second League of FR Yugoslavia: 1999–2000, 2002–03
- FR Yugoslavia Cup: Runner-up 1999–2000

Lokeren

- Belgian Cup: 2011–12, 2013–14
- Belgian Super Cup: Runner-up 2012, 2014
