= 2000 Belgian Super Cup =

2000 Belgian Supercup
Anderlecht	Genk
3	1
- Date: 5 August 2000
- Venue: Constant Vanden Stock Stadium, Brussels
- Referee: Eric Blareau
- Attendance: 15,000

The 2000 Belgian Supercup was a football match between the winners of the previous season's 1999–2000 Belgian First Division and 1999–2000 Belgian Cup competitions: cup winners Genk and league champions Anderlecht.

The match was played on 5 August 2000 at the ground of the league winners Anderlecht, Constant Vanden Stock Stadium. Prior to the game, the clubs agreed to allow more substitutions, leading to Anderlecht making six changes at halftime and seven in total during the game. Anderlecht won the match by three goals to one, winning its fifth Belgian Super Cup, while for Genk it marked the third loss in three years.

== Details ==
5 August 2000

Anderlecht	3–1	Genk
Pirard 34'; Stoica 39'; Anastasiou 58' (pen.)		Thijs 43' (pen.)

Constant Vanden Stock Stadium, Brussels
Attendance: 15,000
Referee: Eric Blareau

Anderlecht	Genk

GK	1	(Belgium) Filip De Wilde	(substituted off) 46'
CB	16	(Belgium) Bertrand Crasson
CB	6	(Belgium) Lorenzo Staelens	(substituted off) 46'
CB	5	(Belgium) Glen De Boeck (c)
LW	7	(Belgium) Bart Goor	(substituted off) 67'
CM	15	(Albania) Besnik Hasi
CM	11	(Romania) Alin Stoica	(substituted off) 46'
CM	10	(Belgium) Walter Baseggio	(substituted off) 46'
RW	21	(Belgium) Emmanuel Pirard
CF	8	(Czech Republic) Jan Koller	(substituted off) 46'
CF	13	(Canada) Tomasz Radzinski	(substituted off) 46'
Substitutes:
CM	4	(Belgium) Yves Vanderhaeghe	(substituted on) 46'
LB	9	(Belgium) Didier Dheedene	(substituted on) 67'
CM	14	(Netherlands) Patrick van Diemen	(substituted on) 46'
CF	20	(Greece) Giannis Anastasiou	(substituted on) 46'
CM	22	(Ukraine) Oleg Yashchuk	(substituted on) 46'
GK	23	(Federal Republic of Yugoslavia) Zvonko Milojevic	(substituted on) 46'
CF	26	(Ivory Coast) Aruna Dindane	(substituted on) 46'
Manager:
(Belgium) Aimé Anthuenis

GK	1	(Belgium) Jan Moons
RB	2	(Belgium) Wilfried Delbroek
CB	3	(Belgium) Domenico Olivieri (c)
CB	4	(Ivory Coast) Didier Zokora
LB	13	(Morocco) Akram Roumani		(substituted off) 71'
RM	7	(Kenya) Mike Origi
CM	10	(Australia) Josip Skoko
CM	14	(Belgium) Bernd Thijs	Booked
LM		(Nigeria) Blessing Kaku		(substituted off) 71'
CF	8	(Belgium) Wesley Sonck
CF	20	(Croatia) Zoran Ban		(substituted off) 71'
Substitutes:
RM	12	(Belgium) Thomas Chatelle		(substituted on) 71'
GK		(Hungary) István Brockhauser
RB		(Rwanda) Fritz Emeran		(substituted on) 71'
		(Belgium) Céderic Van der Elst		(substituted on) 71'
Manager:
(Netherlands) Johan Boskamp

== See also ==
- 2000–01 Belgian First Division
- 2000–01 Belgian Cup
