= Giannis Anastasiou =

Greek football manager and former player

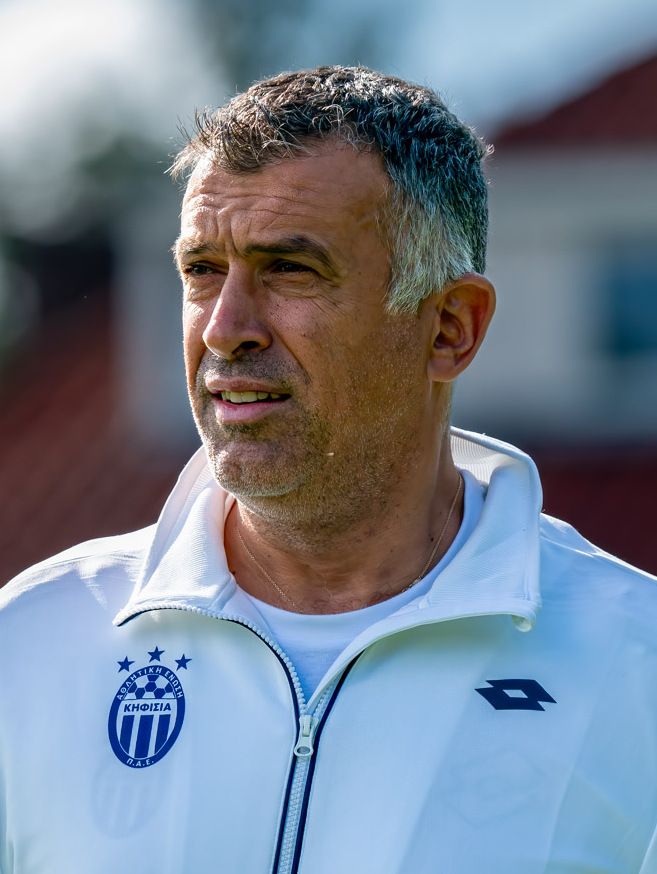

Personal information
- Date of birth: 5 March 1973 (age 53)
- Place of birth: Arta, Greece
- Position: Striker

Senior career*
Years	Team	Apps	(Gls)
1990–1991	Preveza	32	(13)
1991–1996	Ethnikos Piraeus	106	(25)
1996–1999	OFI	82	(22)
1999–2000	Anderlecht	23	(9)
2000–2004	Roda JC	114	(48)
2004–2006	Ajax	32	(7)
2006–2007	Sparta	16	(1)
2007–2008	Omniworld	11	(2)
Total		416	(127)

International career
1998–1999	Greece	5	(0)

Managerial career
- 2013–2015: Panathinaikos
- 2016–2017: Roda JC
- 2017: Kortrijk
- 2018–2019: Omonia
- 2019: Atromitos
- 2021–2023: Panetolikos
- 2023: Kifisia
- 2024: Omonia
- 2025–2026: Panetolikos
- * Club domestic league appearances and goals

Giannis Anastasiou (Greek: Γιάννης Αναστασίου; born 5 March 1973) is a Greek professional football coach and former player.

As a player, Anastasiou played as a striker, and was active professionally in Greece, Belgium and the Netherlands. He also represented the Greece national team at senior international level.

== Playing career ==
Born in Arta, Anastasiou played professionally in Greece, Belgium and the Netherlands for PAS Preveza, Ethnikos Piraeus, OFI, Anderlecht, Roda JC, Ajax, Sparta Rotterdam and Omniworld.

He also earned five caps for the Greece national team between 1998 and 1999.

== Managerial career ==
After his retirement from football in 2008, Anastasiou joined Panathinaikos as an assistant to manager Henk ten Cate. In 2011, he left Greece for the Netherlands as assistant coach for Jong Ajax, the reserve team of Ajax. After two years, Anastasiou joined English club Reading in January 2013 as a first team coach; he had first met their manager Brian McDermott in June 2012 while completing his UEFA Pro License. His stay at Reading lasted just two months, and he left the club following the departure of McDermott on 11 March 2013.

=== Panathinaikos ===
Anastasiou was named manager of Panathinaikos in May 2013. In his first year, the team won the Greek Football Cup with a 4–1 victory against PAOK in the final. During that year, he also led the team in a 3–0 victory against Olympiacos, a record away victory in the derby. In the Super League Greece, the team finished fourth in the regular season and first in the play-offs, qualifying for next year's UEFA Champions League third qualifying round. In February 2015, he was named Manager of the Year for 2014.

In the 2014–15 season, Panathinaikos, was eliminated in the UEFA Champions League third qualifying round by Standard Liège with an aggregate score of 1–2. The team succeeded in entering the UEFA Europa League group stage, finishing last in Group E, against Dynamo Moscow, PSV and Estoril. In the domestic league, Panathinaikos finished second behind Olympiacos in the league and first in the play-offs. On 24 May 2015, Anastasiou managed his 100th game at the side of Panathinaikos, against Atromitos.

In the beginning of the 2015–16 season, the team failed to qualify in the Europa League group stage, getting eliminated by Gabala in the play-offs. On 2 November 2015, Panathinaikos announced the termination of his contract on terms of mutual consent.

=== Roda ===
On 18 June 2016, Anastasiou signed a one-year contract as manager of Dutch Eredivisie side Roda JC, for whom he was also active as a player from 2000 until 2004.

On 24 April 2017, Belgian side KV Kortrijk announced the signing of Anastasiou as their head coach, moving from Roda to Kortrijk at the end of the 2016–17 season.

Anastasiou led Roda to a 17th-place finish in the Eredivisie, which meant that Roda had to play promotion/relegation play-offs. However, on 23 May 2017, midway through the play-offs, Anastasiou was sacked as manager of Roda.

=== Kortrijk ===
At Kortijk, Anastasiou was sacked on 8 November 2017 with the team in penultimate position in the league, just one point above last place.

=== Omonia (first spell) ===
He became manager of Omonia in November 2018.

=== Atromitos ===
On 23 May 2019, Anastasiou became the new head coach of Atromitos, penning a one-year deal with the Peristeri club. On 16 November 2019, Atromitos announced the termination of Anastasiou's contract as coach.

=== Panetolikos ===
In July 2021 he signed a contract with Panetolikos.

=== Omonia (second spell) ===
In February 2024 he returned to Omonia as interim manager until the end of the 2023–24 season, after which he will continue to work for the club as a Strategic Football Planning Consultant.

== Managerial statistics ==
As of match played 7 November 2026

Managerial record by team and tenure
Team	From	To	Record					Ref
Team	From	To	G	W	D	L	Win %	Ref
Panathinaikos	1 June 2013	2 November 2015	118	66	24	28	55.93	
Roda JC	18 June 2016	23 May 2017	37	8	13	16	21.62	
Kortrijk	1 July 2017	8 November 2017	15	3	5	7	20.00	
Omonia	1 November 2018	23 May 2019	28	9	7	12	32.14	
Atromitos	23 May 2019	16 November 2019	14	5	3	6	35.71	
Panetolikos	14 June 2021	23 May 2023	72	21	17	34	29.17	
A.E. Kifisia	29 June 2023	5 December 2023	14	2	5	7	14.29	
Omonia	21 February 2024	30 June 2024	12	8	2	2	66.67	
Panetolikos	7 October 2025	9 November 2026	47	13	9	25	27.66	
Total			357	135	85	137	37.82	—

== Honours ==
=== Player ===
Anderlecht

- Belgian First Division A: 1999–2000
- Belgian Super Cup: 2000

Ajax

- Eredivisie: 2003–04

=== Manager ===
Panathinaikos

- Greek Cup: 2013–14

=== Individual ===
- Super League Greece Manager of the Season: 2013–14
