= 2012 Belgian Cup final =

- Event: 2011–12 Belgian Cup
Lokeren	Kortrijk
1	0
- Date: 24 March 2012
- Venue: King Baudouin Stadium, Brussels
- Referee: Jérôme Efong Nzolo

The 2012 Belgian Cup final, named the Cofidis Cup after the sponsor, was played on 24 March 2012 between Kortrijk and Lokeren. It was the 57th Belgian Cup final and was won by Lokeren.

The match started intensely, with both teams attacking from the start. Kortrijk already had a scoring chance within the first minute, while Lokeren scored an early goal through Hamdi Harbaoui which was correctly disallowed for offside. The major talking point of the match happened after 19 minutes, when a linesman signalled a foul by Lokeren forward and Belgian international Benjamin De Ceulaer, who was subsequently dismissed by referee Jérôme Efong Nzolo with a red card. Nzolo followed the instructions of his assistant and initially showed the red card to a Kortrijk player, when the linesman made clear it should have been De Ceulaer. Both spectators in the stadium and through radio and television broadcast were left unsure about the exact reason as initial replays showed a struggle between Brecht Capon and De Ceulaer, for which a red card seemed very harsh. Although Lokeren played more defensively after the red card, a moderate Kortrijk was not able to create any major chances for the remainder of the first half.

During the second half, Kortrijk did push for the goal and almost scored, with Nebojša Pavlović just missing the cross from Mohamed Messoudi, Ernest Nfor testing the reflexes of Lokeren goalkeeper Copa and Dalibor Veselinović heading a chance wide. In the attacking department of Lokeren, Hamdi Harbaoui was left to handle it on his own, not managing to create any danger. However, with just over an hour played, Lokeren coach brought in Baye Djiby Fall to strengthen the attack and after 77 minutes a play between Fall, Nill De Pauw and Harbaoui set up the latter to lob the ball over Kortrijk goalie Darren Keet. Lokeren was under moderate pressure during the final minutes, but ultimately held on without giving away any major chances. With that, Lokeren had won its first Belgian Cup.

Right after the match, Benjamin De Ceulaer stated that "I'm very happy for our team and president. But for me... the referee took away the most beautiful moment of my career. I will never forgive him. I hope I never meet him again. I refuse to look him in the eye from now on.", but zoomed in replays of the phase indeed showed that De Ceulaer had kicked the legs of Brecht Capon while the ball was nowhere near. Referee Nzolo also stated that he stood behind his decision and although he was forced to follow the judgement of his linesman anyway, he also believed that the linesman made the right judgement and De Ceulaer had been sent off for valid reasons.

== Road to the Final ==
Lokeren		Round	Kortrijk	
Eupen [D2] H 3–0	De Ceulaer 21', 64'; Harbaoui 83'	Round Six	Antwerp [D2] H 1–1 (AET) p.s.: 6–5	Joseph-Monrose 56'
Westerlo [D1] H 3–1	Marić 40' (pen.); Finnbogason 80', 84'	Round Seven	Sint-Truiden [D1] H 1–0	Nfor 50'
Gent [D1] H 1–1	Mokulu 1'	Quarter Finals; First Leg	Beerschot [D1] H 2–0	Zukanović 81'; Messoudi 84'
Gent [D1] A 3–3	Marić 33' (pen.); Patosi 50'; Persoons 87'	Quarter Finals; Second Leg	Beerschot [D1] A 1–2	Veselinović 67'
Lierse [D1] H 1–0	Taravel 57'	Semi-finals; First Leg	Mons [D1] A 2–1	Joseph-Monrose 62'; Messoudi 90'
Lierse [D1] A 3–0	De Pauw 38', 83'; Persoons 42'	Semi-finals; Second Leg	Mons [D1] H 2–2	Joseph-Monrose 33'; Sapina 37' (OG)

- Both clubs received a bye to round six.
- In square brackets is a letter that represents the opposition's division
  - [D1] = Belgian First Division
  - [D2] = Belgian Second Division

== Match details ==
24 March 2012
20:30 CET

Lokeren	1–0	Kortrijk
Harbaoui 77'

King Baudouin Stadium, Brussels
Referee: Jérôme Efong Nzolo

Lokeren	Kortrijk

LOKEREN:
GK	21	(Ivory Coast) Copa
DF	13	(Greece) Georgios Galitsios
DF	23	(Senegal) Ibrahima Gueye
DF	4	(France) Jérémy Taravel
DF	28	(Belgium) Laurens De Bock
MF	7	(Belgium) Killian Overmeire
MF	8	(Belgium) Koen Persoons
MF	10	(Croatia) Ivan Leko		(substituted off) 62'
FW	29	(Belgium) Nill De Pauw		(substituted off) 90+3'
FW	9	(Tunisia) Hamdi Harbaoui		(substituted off) 86'
FW	11	(Belgium) Benjamin De Ceulaer	(red card) 19'
Substitutes:
DF	3	(Morocco) Hassan El Mouataz		(substituted on) 86'
MF	6	(Democratic Republic of the Congo) Tiko
GK	12	(Serbia) Jugoslav Lazić
FW	14	(Democratic Republic of the Congo) Benjamin Mokulu
MF	17	(Norway) Geir Ludvig Fevang		(substituted on) 90+3'
FW	19	(Senegal) Baye Djiby Fall		(substituted on) 62'
MF	24	(South Africa) Ayanda Patosi
Manager:
(Belgium) Peter Maes

KORTRIJK:
GK	16	(South Africa) Darren Keet
MF	21	(Belgium) Brecht Capon
DF	3	(France) Baptiste Martin	(yellow card) 25'
DF	23	(Bosnia and Herzegovina) Ervin Zukanović
MF	11	(Morocco) Mustapha Oussalah
MF	8	(Serbia) Nebojša Pavlović
MF	17	(Belgium) Gertjan De Mets	(yellow card) 60'
MF	10	(Cameroon) Ernest Nfor		(substituted off) 69'
MF	20	(Belgium) Mohamed Messoudi
FW	18	(Argentina) Pablo Chavarría	(yellow card) 13'	(substituted off) 81'
FW	9	(Serbia) Dalibor Veselinović
Substitutes:
GK	1	(Belgium) Kristof van Hout
MF	4	(Senegal) Ismaïla N'Diaye
DF	5	(France) Alassane També
DF	6	(Belgium) David Wijns
FW	7	(France) Steeven Joseph-Monrose		(substituted on) 69'
DF	14	(Democratic Republic of the Congo) Landry Mulemo
MF	19	(Belgium) Brecht Dejaeghere		(substituted on) 81'
Manager:
(Belgium) Hein Vanhaezebrouck

MATCH RULES
- 90 minutes.
- 30 minutes of extra-time if necessary.
- Penalty shoot-out if scores still level.
- Maximum 7 named substitutes
- Maximum of 3 substitutions.

== See also ==
- 2011–12 Belgian Cup
