= 2012 Belgian Super Cup =

Anderlecht	Lokeren
3	2
- Date: 22 July 2012
- Venue: Constant Vanden Stock Stadium, Anderlecht
- Referee: Laurent Colemonts

The 2012 Belgian Super Cup was a football match played on 22 July 2012, between 2011–12 Belgian Pro League winners Anderlecht and 2011–12 Belgian Cup winners Lokeren.

In a dull first half without many chances, Anderlecht took the lead after 25 minutes when Dennis Praet scored the opening goal. Anderlecht had possession, but was not able to create any chances, while Hamdi Harbaoui almost equalized before half time.

Immediately after the break, Jérémy Taravel was wearing the wrong tape around his ankles and asked to change it by the referee, while play continued. Anderlecht used the extra man situation, allowing Dieumerci Mbokani to head in the 2–0. Lokeren coach Peter Maes was furious with Taravel, but could smile again soon after as Ivan Leko lobbed the ball into the Anderlecht goal. On the hour mark, Leko scored the equalizing goal, although Harbaoui had touched the ball with his hands during the play, without being noticed by the referee. Anderlecht then again took control of the match and scored the 3–2 winner 15 minutes from the end through Guillaume Gillet, who shot the ball perfectly into the top corner of the goal. Lokeren was unable to score thereafter, with Anderlecht coming close to a fourth goal as Mbokani hit the post. It stayed 3–2, allowing Anderlecht to win their 10th Belgian Supercup trophy.

== Match details ==
22 July 2012
18:00 CEST

Anderlecht	3–2	Lokeren
Praet 24'; Mbokani 47'; Gillet 76'	Report	Leko 48', 58'

Constant Vanden Stock Stadium, Brussels
Referee: Laurent Colemonts

Anderlecht	Lokeren

RSC ANDERLECHT:
GK	1	(Belgium) Silvio Proto
DF	3	(Belgium) Olivier Deschacht	(yellow card) 36'
MF	5	(Argentina) Lucas Biglia (c)
DF	8	(Belgium) Denis Odoi
FW	10	(Brazil) Kanu		(substituted off) 88'
FW	11	(Serbia) Milan Jovanović		(substituted off) 86'
DF	20	(Sweden) Behrang Safari
FW	25	(Democratic Republic of the Congo) Dieumerci Mbokani	(yellow card) 29'
MF	26	(Belgium) Dennis Praet		(substituted off) 60'
DF	27	(Poland) Marcin Wasilewski
MF	30	(Belgium) Guillaume Gillet
Substitutes:
DF	4	(Saudi Arabia) Osama Hawsawi
GK	13	(Belgium) Thomas Kaminski
FW	17	(Ukraine) Sacha Iakovenko		(substituted on) 88'
MF	19	(United States) Sacha Kljestan		(substituted on) 86'
FW	21	(Belgium) Tom De Sutter
MF	55	(Brazil) Fernando Canesin
MF	70	(Brazil) Reynaldo		(substituted on) 60'
Manager:
(Netherlands) John van den Brom

LOKEREN:
GK	12	(Serbia) Jugoslav Lazić
DF	13	(Greece) Georgios Galitsios
DF	5	(Switzerland) Mijat Marić
DF	4	(France) Jérémy Taravel
DF	28	(Belgium) Laurens De Bock
MF	29	(Belgium) Nill De Pauw	(substituted off) 47'
MF	8	(Belgium) Koen Persoons
MF	7	(Belgium) Killian Overmeire (c)
MF	10	(Croatia) Ivan Leko	(substituted off) 81'
FW	24	(South Africa) Ayanda Patosi	(substituted off) 79'
FW	16	(Tunisia) Hamdi Harbaoui
Substitutes:
GK	30	(Belgium) Nicolas Lemaire
FW	11	(Belgium) Benjamin De Ceulaer	(substituted on) 47'
DF	2	(Belgium) Sepp De Roover
MF	16	(Belgium) Jore Trompet
DF	23	(Senegal) Ibrahima Gueye
FW	19	(Senegal) Baye Djiby Fall	(substituted on) 81'
DF	25	(Belgium) Alexander Corryn	(substituted on) 79'
Manager:
(Belgium) Peter Maes

== See also ==
- 2012–13 Belgian Pro League
- 2012–13 Belgian Cup
