= Olivier Deschacht =

Belgian footballer

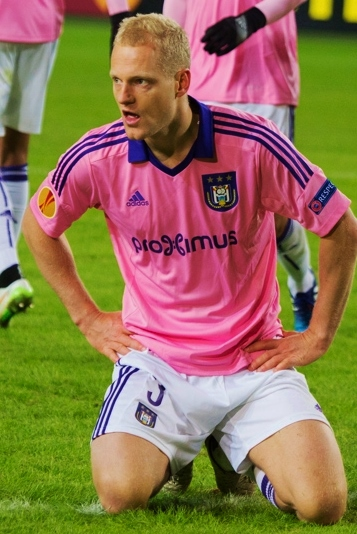
- Deschacht with Anderlecht in 2015

Personal information
- Date of birth: 16 February 1981 (age 45)
- Place of birth: Ghent, Belgium
- Height: 1.86 m (6 ft 1 in)
- Positions: Left-back; centre-back

Team information
- Current team: Belgium U21 (assistant coach)

Youth career
- 1988–1991: Begonia Lochristi
- 1991–1995: Gent
- 1995–1997: Lokeren
- 1997–2001: Anderlecht

Senior career*
Years	Team	Apps	(Gls)
2001–2018	Anderlecht	395	(8)
2018–2019	Lokeren	24	(2)
2019–2021	Zulte Waregem	57	(2)
Total		476	(12)

International career
2002–2003	Belgium U21	6	(0)
2003–2014	Belgium	20	(0)

Managerial career
- 2021–: Belgium U21 (assistant)
- * Club domestic league appearances and goals

Olivier Deschacht (born 16 February 1981) is a Belgian professional football coach and a former football player who played as a left-back or centre-back. He is currently an assistant coach for the Belgium national under-21 football team.

== Career ==
=== Early career ===
At the age of 7, Deschacht began playing for S.K. Begonia Lochristi before he moved to K.A.A. Gent in 1991. He then spent two years (1995–1997) at K.S.C. Lokeren Oost-Vlaanderen.

=== Anderlecht ===
In 1997 he signed for R.S.C. Anderlecht to play in their academy. He made his first team debut on 18 December 2001 under the coaching of Aimé Anthuenis.

For the 2007 season, Deschacht was awarded the captain's armband replacing teammate Bart Goor during Goor's injuries. After Goor's move to Germinal Beerschot, he was awarded captaincy full-time in 2008.

=== Lokeren ===
In August 2018, free agent Deschacht joined Lokeren on a season-long contract, returning to his former youth club.

=== Retirement ===
In April 2021, Deschacht announced that he would retire at the end of the 2020–21 season.

== Coaching career ==
In October 2021, Deschact was appointed assistant coach for the Belgium under-21 national team.

== Career statistics ==
=== Club ===
Appearances and goals by club, season and competition
Club	Season	League			Cup		Europe		Other		Total		Ref.
Club	Season	Division	Apps	Goals	Apps	Goals	Apps	Goals	Apps	Goals	Apps	Goals	Ref.
Anderlecht	2001–02	First Division	12	0	0	0	0	0	0	0	12	0	
Anderlecht	2002–03	First Division	19	0	3	0	0	0	—		22	0	
Anderlecht	2003–04	First Division	29	0	5	0	10	0	—		44	0	
Anderlecht	2004–05	First Division	33	1	2	0	8	0	1 (Note: Appearances in the Belgian Super Cup)	0	44	1	
Anderlecht	2005–06	First Division	33	0	1	0	9 (Note: Appearances in the Champions League)	0	–		43	0	
Anderlecht	2006–07	First Division	34	1	6	0	6	0	1	0	47	1	
Anderlecht	2007–08	First Division	27	0	5	0	9	0	1	0	42	0	
Anderlecht	2008–09	Pro League	32	0	2	0	1	0	3 (Note: Appearances in the Belgian Pro League playoffs)	0	38	0	
Anderlecht	2009–10	Pro League	27	0	3	0	13 (Note: Nine appearances in the Europa League and four in the Champions League)	0	10	0	53	0	
Anderlecht	2010–11	Pro League	12	1	0	0	6 (Note: Three appearances in the Europa League and three in the Champions League)	0	2	0	20	1	
Anderlecht	2011–12	Pro League	13	0	2	0	3 (Note: Appearances in the Europa League)	0	3	0	21	0	
Anderlecht	2012–13	Pro League	20	2	3	0	8	0	8	0	39	2	
Anderlecht	2013–14	Pro League	18	2	2	0	2	0	11	0	33	2	
Anderlecht	2014–15	Pro League	30	1	7	0	8 (Note: Two appearances in the Europa League and six in the Champions League)	0	10	3	55	4	
Anderlecht	2015–16	Pro League	28	0	1	0	10	0	4	0	43	0	
Anderlecht	2016–17	First Division A	12	0	0	0	4	0	4 (Note: Appearances in the Belgian First Division A playoffs)	0	20	0	
Anderlecht	2017–18	First Division A	16	0	1	0	4	0	5	0	26	0	
Anderlecht	Total		395	8	43	0	101	0	63	3	602	11	–
Lokeren	2018–19	First Division A	24	2	2	0	0	0	0	0	26	2	
Zulte Waregem	2019–20	First Division A	24	0	3	0	0	0	0	0	27	0	
Zulte Waregem	2020–21	First Division A	33	2	0	0	0	0	0	0	33	2	
Zulte Waregem	Total		57	2	3	0	0	0	0	3	60	2	–
Career total			476	12	48	0	101	0	63	3	688	15	–

=== International ===
Appearances and goals by national team and year
National team	Year	Apps	Goals
Belgium	2003	3	0
Belgium	2004	5	0
Belgium	2005	6	0
Belgium	2009	4	0
Belgium	2010	2	0
Total		20	0

== Honours ==
Anderlecht

- Belgian First Division: 2003–04, 2005–06, 2006–07, 2009–10, 2011–12, 2012–13, 2013–14, 2016–17
- Belgian Cup: 2007–08
- Belgian Super Cup: 2006, 2007, 2010, 2012, 2013, 2014, 2017

Individual

- Anderlecht Player of the Season: 2014–15
- Player with the most games for Anderlecht (2018): 602
- La Dernière Heure Anderlecht All-Time XI: 2020
