= Philippe Vande Walle =

Belgian footballer

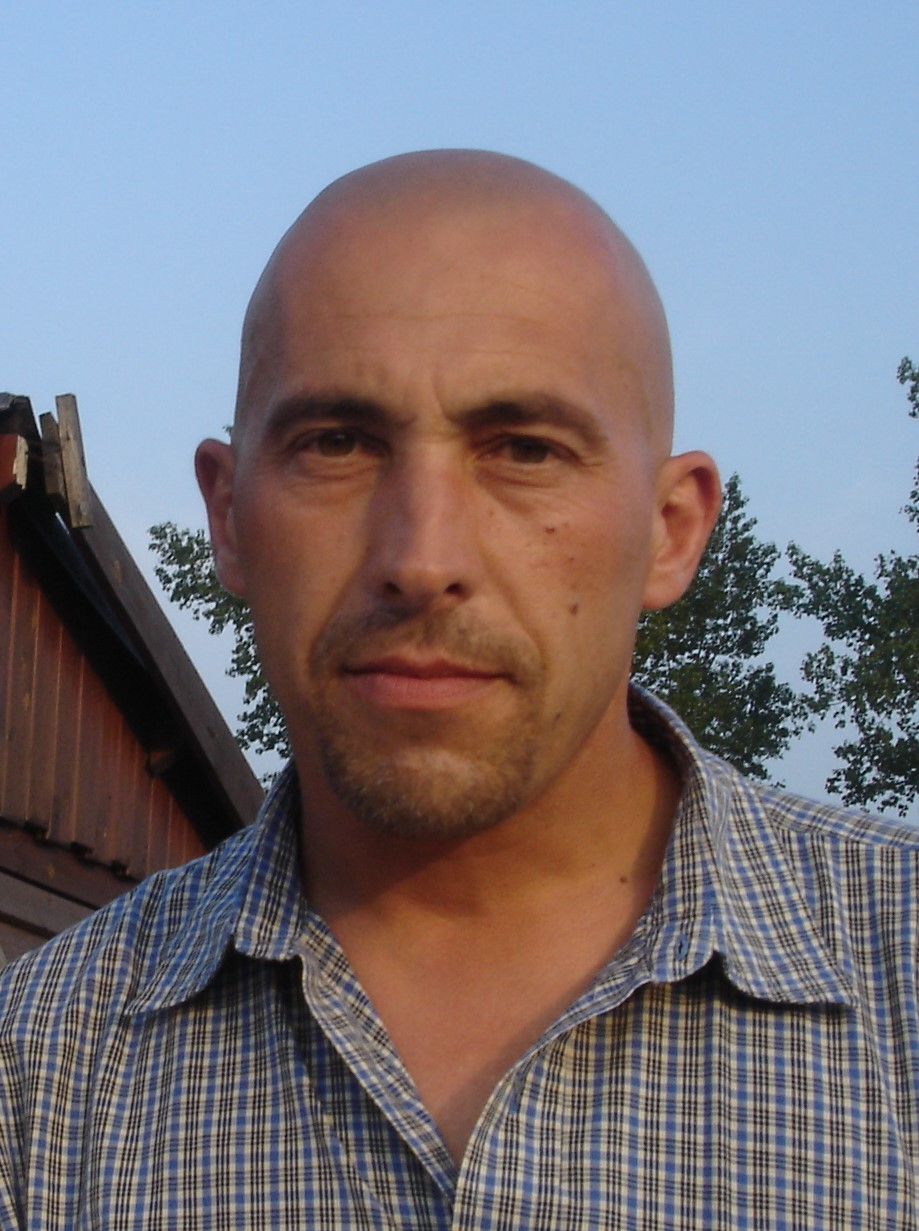

Personal information
- Date of birth: 22 December 1961 (age 64)
- Place of birth: Brugge, Belgium
- Height: 1.84 m (6 ft 1/2 in)
- Position: Goalkeeper

Senior career*
Years	Team	Apps	(Gls)
1979–1980	R. Charleroi S.C.		
1980–1990	Club Brugge		
1990–1997	Germinal Ekeren		
1997	Lierse S.K.		
1998–1999	Eendracht Aalst		
1999	Club Brugge		

International career
1996–1999	Belgium	8	(0)

Managerial career
- 2000–2004: K.A.A. Gent (goalkeeper coach)
- 2004–2007: R. Charleroi S.C. (goalkeeper coach)
- 2007–2008: R. Charleroi S.C.
- 2008–2009: R. Charleroi S.C. (goalkeeper coach)
- 2009–2011: KV Kortrijk (goalkeeper coach)
- 2011–2012: R.A.E.C. Mons (goalkeeper coach)
- 2012–2013: Club Brugge K.V. (goalkeeper coach)
- 2014–2016: KV Mechelen (goalkeeper coach)
- 2016–2017: Standard Liège (goalkeeper coach)
- 2017–: Standard Liège (youth)
- * Club domestic league appearances and goals

Philippe "Nic" Vande Walle (born 22 December 1961) is a former Belgian football goalkeeper. His former clubs include FC Bruges, K.F.C. Germinal Ekeren, K.S.K. Lierse and Eendracht Aalst. Vande Walle was part of the Belgium national team for the 1998 World Cup.

== Honours ==
Germinal Ekeren

- Belgian Cup: 1996–97

Lierse SK

- Belgian Super Cup: 1997
