= Alin Stoica =

Romanian footballer

Personal information
- Full name: Alin Tudor Adi Stoica
- Date of birth: 10 December 1979 (age 46)
- Place of birth: Bucharest, Romania
- Height: 1.76 m (5 ft 9 in)
- Position: Attacking midfielder

Senior career*
Years	Team	Apps	(Gls)
1995–1996	Steaua București	1	(0)
1996–2002	Anderlecht	128	(23)
2002–2004	Club Brugge	34	(6)
2005	Siena	0	(0)
2005	Național București	6	(0)
2006	Politehnica Timișoara	4	(1)
2006–2008	Gent	33	(2)
2008	Mouscron	5	(0)
2009	Braşov	1	(0)
2009	Vojvodina	4	(0)
2013	Politehnica Timișoara	6	(1)
2014	Standaard Wetteren	0	(0)
2015	Concordia Chiajna	0	(0)
Total		222	(33)

International career
1996–1998	Romania U21	8	(1)
1998–2003	Romania	13	(0)
- * Club domestic league appearances and goals

Alin Tudor Adi Stoica (born 10 December 1979) is a Romanian former professional footballer who played as an attacking midfielder. He has been called "one of the greatest, if not the greatest talent" in Belgian football in the late 1990s and early 2000s. In 2003, having recently retired as a player, Gheorghe Hagi named Stoica his potential successor.

Having come through the youth ranks at Steaua București, the biggest club in Romania, he made his senior and professional debut in 1995 at the age of 16. He moved to Belgian club Anderlecht a year later and went on to win three Belgian First Division titles in his six-year stay at the Belgium club. Ahead of the 2002–03 season, he moved to rivals Club Brugge where he won one league title before leaving in 2004 in his mid-20s. Following a two-year spell at Belgian club Gent from 2006 to 2008, he had various stints in Italy, Romania and Serbia but did not settle with any team until his retirement in 2015.

== Club career ==
Stoica joined the Steaua București youth team at the age of six and made his professional debut for Steaua in 1995 at the age of 16. He spent one season at the Romanian champions before moving to the most successful club in Belgium Anderlecht for a transfer fee of €1.2 million in 1996.

He quickly became a fan favorite, being nicknamed "Le Petit Prince du Parc Astrid", and helped the Club to win five titles from 1999 to 2001. In the 2000–01 season he scored four goals, against Real Madrid, Lazio, Leeds United and Dynamo Kyiv, becoming the only Romanian player to achieve this feat in one Champions League season. With 44 games and 13 goals in the 2000–01 season he won the Young Football of the Year award.

In his last year of contract, after he was on the transfer list of several big European Clubs, his negotiations with chairman Roger Vanden Stock for a new contract with a huge salary raise did not conclude and Stoica left Anderlecht to sign with league rivals Club Brugge, just before the beginning of the 2002–03 campaign. With 19 matches and five goals he helped Brugge clinch the league title in his debut season. After two seasons and four trophies he left the Club and signed with Serie A's Siena before joining Romanian club FC Naţional București.

In the winter of 2006, Stoica moved to Politehnica Timişoara, at the request of Gheorghe Hagi, the team's manager. After a good debut, he decided to part ways with "Poli Timisoara" and returned to Belgium in the following summer, starting the season with Gent.

In Stoica's first game for Gent, against Charleroi, a superb back heel pass from him resulted in the 2–1 winning goal. After the departure of manager Georges Leekens, Stoica was not happy with the time given by his new coach Trond Sollied, with whom he had worked before at Club Brugge. After one-and-a-half seasons for "De Buffalo's" he ended his contract and became a free agent.

On 31 January 2008, under the management of his former teammate Enzo Scifo Stoica signed a contract with R.E. Mouscron, which was terminated three months later.

In February of the following year, he returned to Romania, joining FC Brașov on a one-year deal.

Stoica moved to Serbia in 2009, signing for two years with Serbian club FK Vojvodina, but his contract was terminated after one year due to several injuries.

He had two further stints with ASU Politehnica from Romania in 2013 and Standaard Wetteren from Belgium in 2014.

In January 2015, he moved to Liga I club Concordia Chiajna before retiring from professional football.

== International career ==
Stoica's debut for the Romania national team came on 18 March 1998, in a friendly with Israel.

== Personal life ==
Stoica's father, Tudorel, was also a footballer and a midfielder. He is the most capped player in the history of Steaua Bucharest, helping them to win the 1986 European Cup and UEFA Super Cup 1986.

After retiring from football, Stoica served as scout for Anderlecht, and subsequently settled in Belgium.

== Honours ==
Steaua București

- Divizia A: 1995–96
- Romanian Cup: 1995–96

Anderlecht

- Belgian League: 1999–00, 2000–01
- Belgian League Cup: 2000–01
- Belgian Supercup: 2000, 2001

Club Brugge

- Belgian League: 2002–03
- Belgian League Cup: 2003–04
- Belgian Supercup: 2003, 2004

Individual

- Belgian League Young Football of the Year: 2001
