= 1997 Belgian Super Cup =

1997 Belgian Supercup
| Lierse | Germinal Ekeren |
| 1 | 0 |
- Date: 6 August 1997
- Venue: Constant Vanden Stock Stadium, Brussels
- Referee: Marcel Javaux
- Attendance: 7,000

The 1997 Belgian Super Cup was a football match which was played on 6 August 1997, between the winner of the 1996–97 Belgian First Division, Lierse, and the winner of the 1996–97 Belgian Cup, Germinal Ekeren. Lierse won the match 1-0, their first Super Cup victory.

== Match details ==
6 August 1997

| Lierse | 1–0 | Germinal Ekeren |
|---|---|---|
| Huistra 73' |

Constant Vanden Stock Stadium, Anderlecht
Attendance: 7,000
Referee: Marcel Javaux

| Lierse | Germinal |

Lierse SK:
| GK | (Belgium) Philippe Vande Walle |
| RWB | (Belgium) David Brocken (c) |
| CB | (Belgium) Yves Serneels |
| CB | (Norway) Claus Eftevaag | Booked |
| CB | (Belgium) Pascal Bovri |
| LWB | (Belgium) Nico Van Kerckhoven |
| CM | (Poland) Tomasz Zdebel | 89' |
| CM | (Belgium) Frank Leen |
| RW | (Belgium) Robby Van de Weyer | 46' |
| CF | (Austria) Ralph Hasenhüttl | 78' |
| LW | (Netherlands) Pieter Huistra |
Wisselspelers:
| RB | (Belgium) Carl Hoefkens | 89' |
| CB | (Belgium) Daniel Scavone | 78' |
| RF | (Belgium) Frederic Wilkin | 46' |
Coach:
(Belgium) Jos Daerden

Germinal Ekeren:
| GK | (Belgium) Jan Moons |
| RB | (Belgium) Marc Schaessens |
| CB | (Belgium) Alex Camerman | Booked |
| CB | (Belgium) Mike Verstraeten (c) |
| LB | (Belgium) Nick Descamps | Booked | (substituted off) 59' |
| RM | (Belgium) Laurent Dauwe | (substituted off) 81' |
| CM | (Belgium) Emmanuel Karagiannis | Booked | (substituted off) 85' |
| CM | (Belgium) Gunther Hofmans | 75' |
| LM | (Belgium) Ronny Van Geneugden |
| RF | (Canada) Tomasz Radzinski |
| LF | (Netherlands) Edwin van Ankeren | 85' |
Wisselspelers:
| CB | (Belgium) Rudy Moury | 59' |
| CM | (Belgium) Tom Vandervee | 85' |
| CM | (Bosnia and Herzegovina) Cvijan Milošević | 75' |
| CF | (Belgium) Alex Czerniatynski | 85' |
| RF | (Italy) Fiorenzo Serchia | 81' |
Coach:
(Belgium) Herman Helleputte

== See also ==
- 1997–98 Belgian First Division
- 1997–98 Belgian Cup
