= Alassane També =

French footballer (born 1992)

Personal information
- Full name: Alassane També
- Date of birth: 26 January 1992 (age 34)
- Place of birth: Villepinte, France
- Height: 1.82 m (6 ft 0 in)
- Positions: Right-back; centre-back

Youth career
- Villepinte FC
- 2002–2009: Paris Saint-Germain

Senior career*
| Years | Team | Apps | (Gls) |
| 2009–2012 | Paris Saint-Germain B | 44 | (0) |
| 2012–2014 | Kortrijk | 41 | (0) |
| 2013–2014 | → Antwerp (loan) | 13 | (0) |
| 2015–2016 | Genoa | 6 | (0) |
| 2016–2017 | Tondela | 5 | (0) |
| 2018–2019 | Aubervilliers | 11 | (0) |
| 2019 | Sant Julià | | |
| 2020–2021 | FC 93 | 0 | (0) |

International career
| 2006–2007 | France U16 | 4 | (0) |
| 2007–2009 | France U17 | 12 | (2) |
| 2009–2010 | France U18 | 9 | (0) |
| 2010–2011 | France U19 | 1 | (0) |
| 2011 | France U20 | 1 | (0) |
- * Club domestic league appearances and goals as of 19:56, 16 June 2022 (UTC)

Alassane També (born 26 January 1992) is a French professional footballer who plays as a right-back and centre-back.

== Club career ==
=== Early career ===
També started playing football in the streets of Villepinte, a city in the Île-de-France region. After playing for local side Villepinte FC, he joined Paris Saint-Germain (PSG) in 2002. In the Paris Saint-Germain Academy, he established himself as a leader of his generation, being a captain from under-11 to under-17 level, while having teammates such as Chris Mavinga, Loïck Landre and Gianelli Imbula.

=== Paris Saint-Germain ===
During the 2008–09 season, També signed a three-year professional deal with PSG, and became at the time the youngest player to sign a professional contract for the club. També said "It means a lot for me to sign my first contract with Paris Saint-Germain. It's also great that the club is looking after their youth players. To sign at just 17 years of age a pro contract is simply fantastic, my dream came true but it's only the start for me. I have to keep on working and continue my development." Across three seasons, També went on to make 44 appearances for Paris Saint-Germain's reserve side in the Championnat de France Amateur (CFA). He never made a professional appearance for the club's first team.

=== Kortrijk ===
In January 2012, També signed for Belgian club Kortrijk. He made his debut for the club on 4 February 2012. També played and started most of the games during the second half of the 2011–12 season, helping his to reach the 2012 Belgian Cup Final against Lokeren, where they lost 1–0 at the King Baudouin Stadium.

=== Genoa and Tondela ===
In February 2015, També signed a four-and-a-half-year deal with Genoa. On 13 July 2016, he joined Primeira Liga team Tondela on a one-year deal.

== Honours ==
Paris Saint-Germain U19

- Championnat National U19: 2010–11

Kortrijk

- Belgian Cup runner-up: 2011–12
