= Tsholola Tshinyama =

Congolese footballer (born 1980)

Tiko
Personal information
- Full name: Tsholola Tshinyama
- Date of birth: 12 December 1980 (age 45)
- Place of birth: Kananga, DR Congo
- Height: 1.77 m (5 ft 10 in)
- Position: Midfielder

Senior career*
Years	Team	Apps	(Gls)
2000	Saint-Luc	30	(1)
2001–2003	TP Mazembe	63	(6)
2003–2007	Ajax Cape Town	98	(5)
2007–2013	Lokeren	135	(2)
2013–2014	K.S.K. Halle	1	(0)
Total		327	(14)

International career
2001–2011	DR Congo	39	(1)
- * Club domestic league appearances and goals

Tsholola Tshinyama (born 12 December 1980), commonly known as Tiko, is a Congolese former professional footballer who played as a midfielder.

Tshinyama started his career at Congolese side Saint-Luc before moving to TP Mazembe. In 2003, he signed for the South African team Ajax Cape Town and went on to make more than 60 appearances for the side. Despite playing primarily as a defensive midfielder Tshinyama also scored on several occasions for them.

In June 2007 it was announced that Tshinyama had signed a four-year contract with SC Lokeren where he would join up with international teammates Marcel Mbayo and Patiyo Tambwe.

== Honours ==
Lokeren

- Belgian Cup: 2011–12
