= Guillaume Gillet =

Belgian footballer (born 1984)

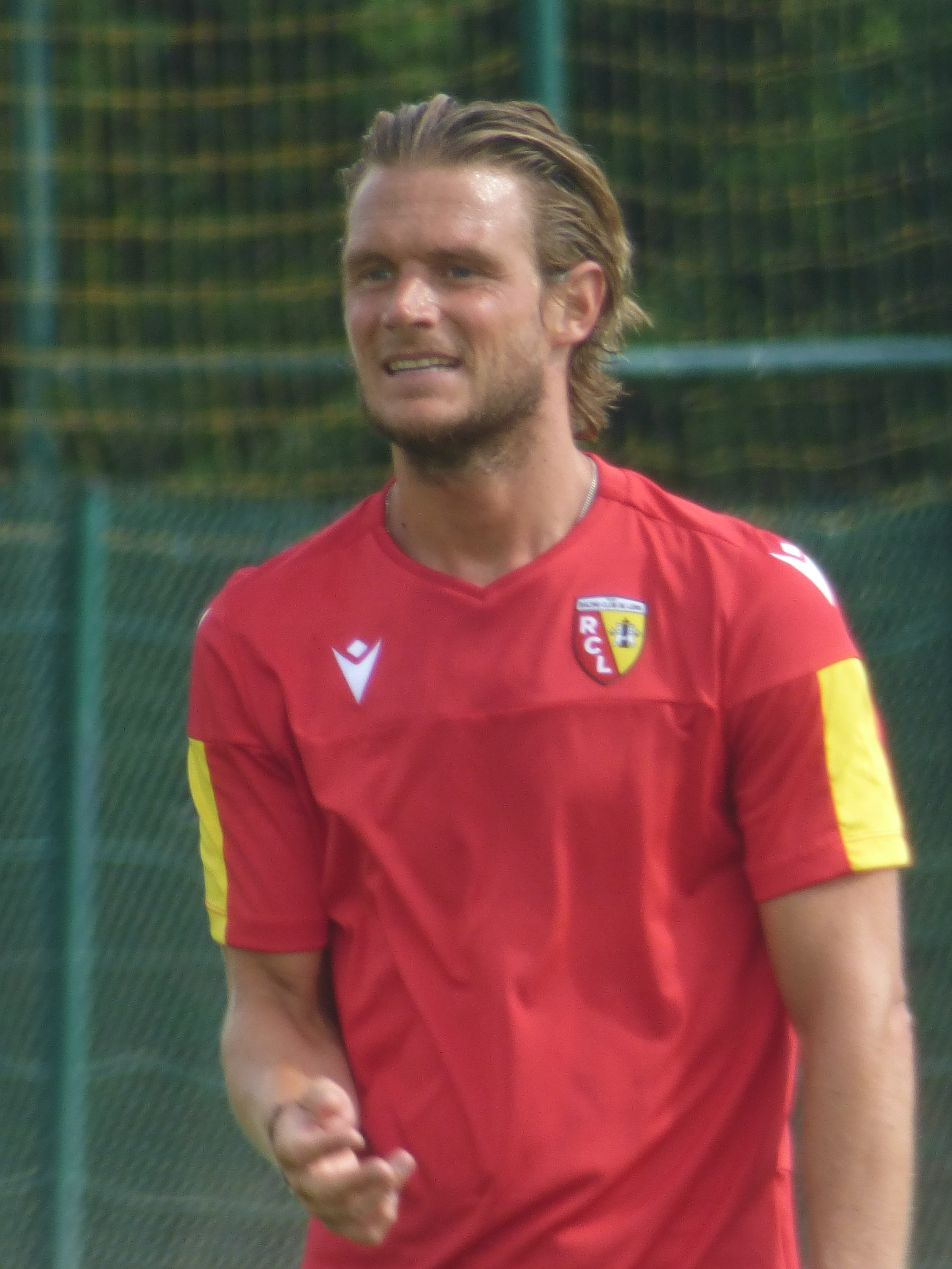
- Gillet with Lens in 2019

Personal information
- Date of birth: 9 March 1984 (age 42)
- Place of birth: Liège, Belgium
- Positions: Midfielder; right back

Senior career*
Years	Team	Apps	(Gls)
2002–2004	Liège	32	(3)
2004–2005	Visé	33	(4)
2005–2006	Eupen	32	(16)
2006–2008	Gent	45	(4)
2008–2015	Anderlecht	248	(48)
2014–2015	→ Bastia (loan)	38	(2)
2015–2017	Nantes	58	(4)
2017–2018	Olympiacos	16	(1)
2018–2020	Lens	48	(3)
2020–2022	Charleroi	44	(0)
2022	Waasland-Beveren	12	(0)
2022	Anderlecht	0	(0)
Total		606	(85)

International career
2006–2007	Belgium U21	2	(0)
2007–2016	Belgium	22	(1)

Managerial career
- 2022–2023: RSCA Futures
- * Club domestic league appearances and goals

Guillaume Gillet (born 9 March 1984) is a Belgian professional football coach and former player.

== Club career ==
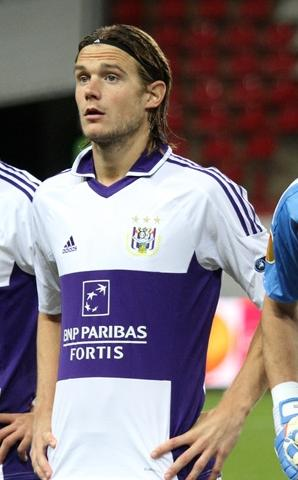
Gillet with Anderlecht during 2011.

Born in Liège, Gillet has played for RFC Liège, Visé, Eupen, Gent, Anderlecht and SC Bastia who Gillet joined on a season-long loan deal with on 10 July 2014. On 1 November Gillet scored a costly own goal as Bastia lost 1–0 at home to Guingamp.

In December 2015, while at Anderlecht, Gillet said he had turned down an offer from LA Galaxy but that he could still move to Major League Soccer that winter. He was out of contract at the end of the season. Eventually on 28 December 2015 has joined FC Nantes from Jupiler League champions Anderlecht.

On 7 August 2017, Gillet signed a two-year contract with Olympiacos, thereby re-uniting with his former manager at Anderlecht, Besnik Hasi. On 18 November 2017, he scored his first goal with the club opening the score in a 2–1 home league game against Levadiakos. He left Olympiakos at the end of the 2017–18 season.

On 2 August 2018, Gillet signed a two-year contract with French Ligue 2 club RC Lens. After his second season with Lens, during which he helped the club achieve promotion to Ligue 1, his contract was not renewed.

In July 2020, Gillet returned to Belgium having agreed a one-year contract with Sporting Charleroi.

On 12 January 2022, Gillet joined Waasland-Beveren in the second-tier Belgian First Division B until the end of the 2021–22 season.

In May 2022 he returned to Anderlecht, to play with their under-23 team.

== International career ==
Gillet made his international debut for Belgium in 2007, and has appeared in FIFA World Cup qualifying matches for his country, scoring the equalising goal in the 45th minute in a 1–1 draw with Croatia.

=== International goals ===
List of international goals scored by Guillaume Gillet
#	Date	Venue	Opponent	Score	Result	Competition
1.	11 September 2012	King Baudouin Stadium, Brussels, Belgium	Croatia	1–1	1–1	2014 FIFA World Cup qualification

== Coaching career ==
He became head coach of RSCA Futures in November 2022. He left the club in June 2023, being replaced by Marink Reedijk.

== Honours ==
Anderlecht

- Belgian Cup: 2007–08
- Belgian Super Cup: 2010, 2012, 2013
- Belgian Pro League: 2009–10, 2011–12, 2012–13, 2013–14
