= Emmanuel Pirard =

Belgian footballer (born 1974)

Personal information
- Date of birth: 21 February 1974 (age 52)
- Place of birth: Belgium
- Position: Defender

Senior career*
Years	Team	Apps	(Gls)
1994–1995	FC Herstal		
1995–1996	Hoeselt VV		
1996–1997	RRFC Montegnée		
1997–1998	RFC Liège	16	(2)
1998–2000	RAA Louviéroise	42	(5)
2000–2002	RSC Anderlecht	9	(0)
2002–2004	CS Visé	23	(2)
2004–2006	RRFC Montegnée	37	(2)
2006–2008	CS Visé	38	(0)
- * Club domestic league appearances and goals

Emmanuel Pirard (born 21 February 1974) is a Belgian former footballer who played as a defender.

== Early life ==
Pirard was born in 1974 in Belgium. He has been a supporter of Belgian side RSC Anderlecht.

== Career ==
Pirard started his career with Belgian side FC Herstal. In 1995, he signed for Belgian side Hoeselt VV. In 1996, he signed for Belgian side RRFC Montegnée. In 1997, he signed for Belgian side RFC Liège. In 1998, he signed for Belgian side RAA Louviéroise. In 2000, he signed for Belgian side RSC Anderlecht. He helped the club win the Belgian Super Cup. In 2002, he signed for Belgian side CS Visé. In 2004, he returned to Belgian side RRFC Montegnée. In 2006 he returned to Belgian side CS Visé.

== Personal life ==
Pirard is a native of Juslenville, Belgium. After retiring from professional football, he worked at a rehabilitation center.
