= Hassan El Mouataz =

Moroccan footballer

Personal information
- Full name: Hassan El Mouataz
- Date of birth: 21 September 1981 (age 45)
- Place of birth: Rabat, Morocco
- Height: 1.79 m (5 ft 10 in)
- Position: Left back

Senior career*
Years	Team	Apps	(Gls)
2000–2006	FAR Rabat		
2006–2013	Lokeren	114	(3)

International career
2009–	Morocco	6	(2)
- * Club domestic league appearances and goals as of 17 May 2011

Hassan El Mouataz (born 21 September 1981 in Rabat, Morocco) is a Moroccan football defender.

El Mouataz played 8 seasons for Belgian side Lokeren between 2006 and 2013 and has also made six appearances for Morocco, scoring two goals. As of 2013, he is a free agent player after his contract with Lokeren ended.

== International career ==
Mouataz earned his first cap for the Morocco national football team during a friendly against Czech Republic on 11 February 2009. The match was played in Morocco and finished 0-0.

== Honours ==
Lokeren

- Belgian Cup: 2011–12
