= Jérémy Taravel =

French footballer (born 1987)

Personal information
- Date of birth: 17 April 1987 (age 39)
- Place of birth: Vincennes, France
- Height: 1.91 m (6 ft 3 in)
- Position: Centre-back

Team information
- Current team: Anderlecht (assistant)

Youth career
- 1993–1997: Club Olympique Vincennois
- 2000–2002: INF Clairefontaine
- 2001–2005: Créteil
- 2005–2007: Lille

Senior career*
Years	Team	Apps	(Gls)
2007–2009	Lille B	10	(0)
2008	→ Troyes (loan)	0	(0)
2009	→ Zulte Waregem (loan)	15	(1)
2009–2010	Zulte Waregem	27	(2)
2010–2013	Lokeren	110	(11)
2013–2016	Dinamo Zagreb	34	(5)
2016–2017	Gent	3	(0)
2017	→ Sion (loan)	5	(0)
2017–2021	Cercle Brugge	75	(6)
2021–2022	Mouscron	22	(0)
Total		301	(25)

Managerial career
- 2026: Anderlecht
- * Club domestic league appearances and goals

Jérémy Taravel (born 17 April 1987) is a French professional football manager and former player who played as a centre-back. He is currently the assistant manager of Belgian Pro League club Anderlecht.

== Career ==
Jérémy Taravel began his career as a professional footballer at the second team of Lille after working his way up from the youth academy. A loan spell at Troyes AC in 2008 was unsuccessful as he did not manage a single appearance but the next year, on 2 January 2009, he was loaned to Belgian side S.V. Zulte Waregem. For a period while on loan, Taravel was consistently a starter in the first team; Zulte Waregem exercised their buy option included in the deal and signed him on a permanent basis from Lille.

On 24 June 2010, Taravel signed a three-year contract with Belgian side K.S.C. Lokeren Oost-Vlaanderen, transferring from Zulte Waregem. Over the next three and a half years at Lokeren Oost-Vlaanderen, he amassed 125 appearances and scored 25 goals.

His consistent performances at Lokeren persuaded Croatian side Dinamo Zagreb to acquire Taravel for €1.6 million in January 2014. Taravel made just one appearance for Dinamo Zagreb that season, in a 2–1 home win over RNK Split due to a severe knee ligaments injury in training which ruled him out for the rest of the season.

With dwindling performances due to injuries, Taravel transferred to Belgian side Gent in August 2016 for €500,000 fee. He failed to meet the expectations during the 2016–17 season which prompted a loan move to Swiss side FC Sion in February 2017.

Taravel joined Cercle Brugge in August 2017; on 13 August 2021, he joined Mouscron on a one-year deal with an option for extension.

== Personal life ==
Taravel is the older brother of Nicolas Taravel, who is also a professional footballer.

== Managerial statistics ==
As of 24 May 2026

Managerial record by team and tenure
Team	From	To	Record								Ref
Team	From	To	G	W	D	L	GF	GA	GD	Win %	Ref
Anderlecht (interim)	9 February 2026	30 June 2026	18	6	4	8	34	35	−1	33.33	
Total			18	6	4	8	34	35	−1	33.33	—

== Honours ==
Lokeren

- Belgian Cup: 2011–12
