= Baptiste Schmisser =

French footballer (born 1986)

Personal information
- Date of birth: 26 February 1986 (age 40)
- Place of birth: Metz, France
- Height: 1.94 m (6 ft 4 in)
- Position: Centre-back

Team information
- Current team: Excelsior Zedelgem

Senior career*
Years	Team	Apps	(Gls)
2010–2012	CS Visé	39	(1)
2012–2016	Oostende	91	(11)
2016	Royal Antwerp	2	(0)
2016–2019	Roeselare	70	(6)
2019–2020	Torhout		
2020–2021	URSL Visé	2	(0)
2021–2022	Oostnieuwkerke		
2022–2024	Roeselare-Daisel		
2024–	Excelsior Zedelgem		
- * Club domestic league appearances and goals as of 21 January 2026

Baptiste Schmisser (born 26 February 1986) is a French professional footballer who plays as a centre back for Excelsior Zedelgem.

== Career ==
=== KM Torhout ===
On 31 August 2019, Schmisser joined KM Torhout.
