= KFC Eendracht Zele =

Belgian football club

Eendracht Zele
- Full name: KFC Eendracht Zele
- Short name: Eendracht Zele
- Founded: 1970
- Ground: Ter Elst Stadium, Zele, Belgium
- Capacity: 1000
- Chairman: (Belgium) Philippe Verbeeck
- Manager: Erik Beeckman
- League: Provincial Leagues
- 2016–17: Third Amateur Division, 16th (relegated)
- Website: http://www.eendrachtzele.be/
Home colours	Away colours

Koninklijke Football Club Eendracht Zele is a Belgian association football club from the city of Zele, in East Flanders.

== History ==
The club was founded in 1927 as SK Zele and remained that way for 25 years, as the name of the association was renamed the KSK Zele in 1952. The name KSK Zele would eventually last 18 more years, until 1970, when several mergers, a merger of the KSK Zele to the KFC Scela Zele and FC De Zeven, to currently playing as club KFC Eendracht Zele. the clubs matricule number is 1046 and the team colours are black and red.

== Current squad ==
As of 1 August 2017

Note: Flags indicate national team as defined under FIFA eligibility rules; some limited exceptions apply. Players may hold more than one non-FIFA nationality.

No.	Pos.	Nation	Player
—	GK		Yannick Laboeuf
—	GK		Alexander van Wauwe
—	GK		Kenneth Leemans
—	DF		Cedric Heylen
—	DF		Quinten Crapoen
—	DF		Niels Loriers
—	DF		Keanu Heirewegh
—	DF		Thorben van den Abbeele
—	DF		Sander van Bogaert
—	DF		Laurence Tronckoe
—	DF		Maxime Bicque
—	DF		Thomas Michet
—	MF		Lucas Coppens

No.	Pos.	Nation	Player
—	MF		Timo Roels
—	MF		Lars Kint
—	MF		Nick Dhaene
—	MF		Kevin Kesteloot
—	MF		Randy Mayeto
—	MF		Stef De Bruyne
—	FW		Elias Kaddouch
—	FW		Ian Raemaekers
—	FW		Danté Cooreman
—	FW		Thomas Zwart
—	FW		Papy Keita
—	FW		Jordy De Caluwe
