= Alessio Staelens =

Belgian footballer

Personal information
- Date of birth: 30 July 1994 (age 32)
- Place of birth: Belgium
- Height: 1.82 m (6 ft 0 in)
- Position: Attacking midfielder

Team information
- Current team: Mandel United
- Number: 13

Youth career
- –2013: Cercle Brugge

Senior career*
Years	Team	Apps	(Gls)
2013– 2015	Cercle Brugge	16	(0)
2014–2015	→ Deinze (loan)	31	(8)
2015–2016	KVK Westhoek	12	(2)
2016–2019	Knokke	100	(65)
2019–2025	Deinze	136	(18)
2025	Roeselare	10	(1)
2025–	Mandel United	0	(0)
- * Club domestic league appearances and goals as of 21 January 2026

Alessio Staelens (born 30 July 1994) is a Belgian professional footballer who plays as a midfielder for the Belgian club RFC Mandel United.

== Club career ==
On 23 May 2013 he replaced Michael Uchebo in the promotion/relegation game between Cercle Brugge and Royal Mouscron-Péruwelz after 86 minutes. Cercle lost the game by two goals of John Jairo Ruiz, but in spite of this result for Cercle this meant they remained in the Belgian Pro League because of their large point advantage.

== Family ==
Alessio Staelens is son of the former international footballer and current Cercle Brugge coach Lorenzo Staelens. Alessio's brother-in-law is Daan van Gijseghem who also plays in Belgian First Division (currently with RAEC Mons).
