= Matthias Trenson =

Belgian footballer

Personal information
- Date of birth: 3 October 1986 (age 40)
- Place of birth: Bruges, Belgium
- Height: 1.83 m (6 ft 0 in)
- Position: Wing back

Team information
- Current team: KFC Lille

Youth career
- 1991–1994: KFC Varsenare
- 1994–2006: Club Brugge

Senior career*
Years	Team	Apps	(Gls)
2007	Sint-Truiden	6	(0)
2007–2010	Royal Antwerp FC	66	(0)
2010–2012	Enosis Neon Paralimni FC	52	(1)
2012–2014	KVC Westerlo	49	(0)
2014–2015	OH Leuven	13	(0)
2015–2016	Sporting Hasselt	18	(0)
2016–2019	Nijlen	0	(0)
2019–	KFC Lille	0	(0)
- * Club domestic league appearances and goals as of 29 December 2015

Matthias Trenson (born 3 October 1986) is a Belgian football player, who plays for KFC Lille in the Belgian Provincial Leagues as a defender.

== Club career ==
Trenson started his professional career with Sint-Truiden, but was born in Bruges and spent his youth career mostly with Club Brugge.
