= Jan Moons =

Belgian footballer

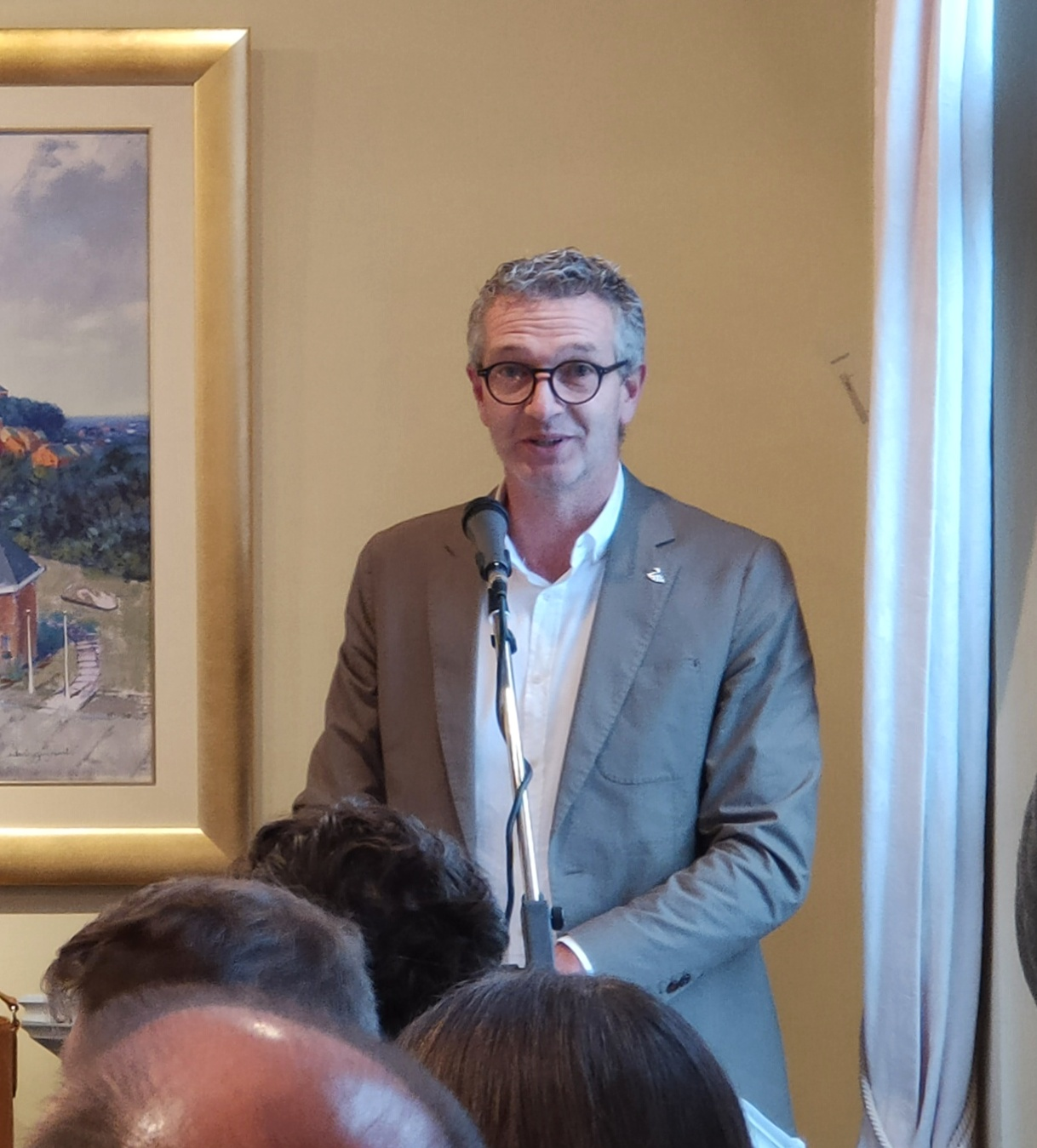

Jan Moons (born 26 September 1970) is a Belgian former professional footballer who played as a goalkeeper. He played in the Jupiler League for K.F.C. Germinal Beerschot, K.R.C. Genk and S.K. Lierse. Moons entered politics after his retirement from football in 2010. Between 2022 and 2024 he was mayor of Heist-op-den-Berg.
