= Killian Overmeire =

Belgian footballer (born 1985)

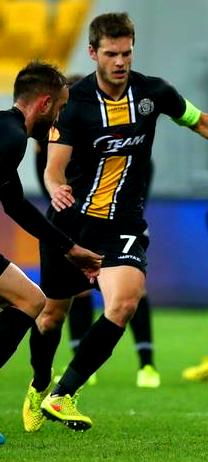

Personal information
- Full name: Killian Per Overmeire
- Date of birth: 6 December 1985 (age 40)
- Place of birth: Lokeren, Belgium
- Height: 1.88 m (6 ft 2 in)
- Position: Midfielder

Youth career
- 1994–2003: Lokeren

Senior career*
Years	Team	Apps	(Gls)
2003–2020	Lokeren	474	(15)
2020–2021	Lokeren-Temse	0	(0)

International career
2003–2004	Belgium U19	11	(2)
2005–2008	Belgium U21	12	(0)
2008	Belgium	1	(0)
- * Club domestic league appearances and goals

Killian Overmeire (born 6 December 1985) is a Belgian former professional footballer who played as a defensive midfielder.

== Career ==
A youth exponent of Lokeren, Overmeire was active at the club from 2003 until 2020, where the club was declared bankrupt. He went on to play more than 400 league games for Lokeren. After the bankruptcy, Overmeire moved to Lokeren-Temse where he only made one cup appearance, before retiring from football in April 2021. He has since run two businesses with a partner.

== Honours ==
Lokeren

- Belgian Cup: 2011–12, 2013–14

== See also ==
- List of one-club men
