= Belgian Super Cup =

- Organiser(s): Royal Belgian Football Association; Belgian Pro League
- Founded: 1979
- Region: Belgium
- Teams: 2
- Related competitions: Belgian Cup (qualifier); Belgian Pro League (qualifier)
- Current champions: Club Brugge (18th title)
- Most championships: Club Brugge (18 titles)
- Broadcaster: Dazn
- Website: Official website
- 2026 Belgian Super Cup

The Belgian Super Cup (Dutch: Belgische Supercup [ˈbɛlɣisə ˈsʏpərˌkʏp]; French: Supercoupe de Belgique [sypɛʁkup də bɛlʒik]; German: Belgischer Fußball-Super Cup), Pro League Supercup, is a Belgian club competition played as a single match between the Belgian Pro League champions (also received the Super Cup host) and the Belgian Cup winners. If both teams are the same, the Belgian Cup runners-up participates as the second club. Since the 2025 edition, the match is called the Volkswagen Supercup for sponsorship reasons.

The most successful Super Cup club is Club Brugge with 18 titles, followed by Anderlecht (13), Standard Liège (4), Genk (2), Beveren (2) and Lierse (2). It was created in 1979 and held every year since, with the only exception 1989 and 2020.

The current holders are Club Brugge, who defeated Union SG in the 2025 Belgian Super Cup.

== Results ==
The winner of the Belgian Super Cup receives this trophy from the Pro League.

The winning team is shown in green background and italic is used for cup runners-up taking part when the league champion also won the cup the prior season. The score of the penalty shoot-out is mentioned between brackets.

Year	League champions	Result	Cup winners (Note: Unless noted otherwise.)	Attendance	Venue	Note
1979	Beveren	1–1 (3–2 pen.)	Beerschot VAC	8,000	Olympic Stadium	
1980	Club Brugge	1–1 (4–3 pen.)	Beveren		Heysel Stadium	(Note: In 1980 and 1982, the Belgian Cup was won by Waterschei. However, as an amateur team, they were not allowed by the Belgian FA to play the Super Cup. As such, their place was taken by the losing cup finalists, Beveren (in 1980) and Waregem (in 1982).)
1981	Anderlecht	0–0 (1–3 pen.)	Standard Liège	35,000		
1982	Standard Liège	2–3	Waregem			
1983	Standard Liège	1–1 (5–4 pen.)	Beveren			
1984	Beveren	5–1	Gent		Constant Vanden Stock Stadium	
1985	Anderlecht	2–1	Cercle Brugge			
1986	Anderlecht	0–1	Club Brugge		Constant Vanden Stock Stadium	
1987	Anderlecht	1–1	KV Mechelen			(Note: In 1987, the Super Cup was played over two legs.)
1987	Anderlecht	2–0	KV Mechelen			(Note: In 1987, the Super Cup was played over two legs.)
1988	Club Brugge	1–0	Anderlecht			
1989	KV Mechelen	—	Anderlecht	—	—	(Note: In 1989, the Super Cup was not played.)
1990	Club Brugge	2–2 (7–6 pen.)	RFC Liége		Heysel Stadium	
1991	Anderlecht	3–3 (5–6 pen.)	Club Brugge		Constant Vanden Stock Stadium	
1992	Club Brugge	1–1 (4–1 pen.)	Antwerp		Olympiastadion	
1993	Anderlecht	3–0	Standard Liège		Constant Vanden Stock Stadium	
1994	Anderlecht	1–3	Club Brugge		Constant Vanden Stock Stadium	(Note: As Anderlecht had won the double, cup finalist Club Brugge played the Super Cup.)
1995	Anderlecht	2–1	Club Brugge		Constant Vanden Stock Stadium	
1996	Club Brugge	5–2	Cercle Brugge		Olympiastadion	(Note: As Club Brugge had won the double, cup finalist Cercle Brugge played the Super Cup.)
1997	Lierse	1–0	Germinal Ekeren	7,000	Constant Vanden Stock Stadium	
1998	Club Brugge	2–1	Genk	1,700	Jan Breydel Stadium	
1999	Genk	1–3	Lierse	16,000	Fenix stadium	
2000	Anderlecht	3–1	Genk	15,000	Constant Vanden Stock Stadium	
2001	Anderlecht	4–1	Westerlo	5,000	Het Kuipje	
2002	Genk	0–2	Club Brugge	8,163	Fenix stadium	
2003	Club Brugge	1–1 (5–4 pen.)	La Louvière	3,268	Jan Breydel Stadium	
2004	Anderlecht	0–2	Club Brugge	8,500	Constant Vanden Stock Stadium	
2005	Club Brugge	1–1 (4–2 pen.)	Germinal Beerschot	3,632	Jan Breydel Stadium	
2006	Anderlecht	3–1	Zulte Waregem	13,000	Constant Vanden Stock Stadium	(Note: The match was originally played on 22 July 2006, but had to be stopped at half-time (0–0) due to heavy rain. The match was replayed on 20 December of the same year.)
2007	Anderlecht	3–1	Club Brugge	15,000	Constant Vanden Stock Stadium	
2008	Standard Liège	3–1	Anderlecht	17,500	Stade Maurice Dufrasne	
2009	Standard Liège	2–0	Genk		Stade Maurice Dufrasne	
2010	Anderlecht	1–0	Gent	14,000	Constant Vanden Stock Stadium	
2011	Genk	1–0	Standard Liège	7,000	Cristal Arena	
2012	Anderlecht	3–2	Lokeren	15,000	Constant Vanden Stock Stadium	
2013	Anderlecht	1–0	Genk	18,000	Constant Vanden Stock Stadium	
2014	Anderlecht	2–1	Lokeren		Constant Vanden Stock Stadium	
2015	Gent	1–0	Club Brugge	15,000	Ghelamco Arena	
2016	Club Brugge	2–1	Standard Liège	15,000	Jan Breydel Stadium	
2017	Anderlecht	2–1	Zulte Waregem	21,500	Constant Vanden Stock Stadium	
2018	Club Brugge	2–1	Standard Liège	16,000	Jan Breydel Stadium	
2019	Genk	3–0	KV Mechelen	14,160	Cristal Arena	
2020	Club Brugge	—	Antwerp	—	—	(Note: In 2020, the Super Cup was not played.)
2021	Club Brugge	3–2	Genk	10,000	Jan Breydel Stadium	
2022	Club Brugge	1–0	Gent	18,166	Jan Breydel Stadium	
2023	Antwerp	1–1 (5–4 pen.)	KV Mechelen	16,000	Bosuilstadion	(Note: As Antwerp had won the double, cup finalist KV Mechelen played the Super Cup.)
2024	Club Brugge	1–2	Union SG	18,000	Jan Breydel Stadium	
2025	Union SG	1–2	Club Brugge	8,500	Joseph Marien Stadium	
2026	Club Brugge vs. Union SG				Jan Breydel Stadium	

== Performance by club ==
Below is the performance listed per club, sorted by number of wins.

Team	Winners	Runners-up	Years won	Years runners-up	Total appearances
Club Brugge	18	4	1980, 1986, 1988, 1990, 1991, 1992, 1994, 1996, 1998, 2002, 2003, 2004, 2005, 2016, 2018, 2021, 2022, 2025	1995, 2007, 2015, 2024	22
Anderlecht	13	7	1985, 1987, 1993, 1995, 2000, 2001, 2006, 2007, 2010, 2012, 2013, 2014, 2017	1981, 1986, 1988, 1991, 1994, 2004, 2008	20
Standard Liège	4	5	1981, 1983, 2008, 2009	1982, 1993, 2011, 2016, 2018	9
Genk	2	7	2011, 2019	1998, 1999, 2000, 2002, 2009, 2013, 2021	9
Beveren	2	2	1979, 1984	1980, 1983	4
Lierse	2	0	1997, 1999	–	2
Gent	1	3	2015	1984, 2010, 2022	4
Antwerp	1	1	2023	1992	2
Union SG	1	1	2024	2025	2
Waregem	1	0	1982	–	1
Mechelen	0	3	–	1987, 2019, 2023	3
Cercle Brugge	0	2	–	1985, 1996	2
Lokeren	0	2	–	2012, 2014	2
Zulte Waregem	0	2	–	2006, 2017	2
Beerschot AC	0	2	–	1997 (as Germinal Ekeren), 2005 (as Germinal Beerschot)	2
Westerlo	0	1	–	2001	1
RFC Liège	0	1	–	1990	1
Beerschot VAC	0	1	–	1979	1
La Louvière	0	1	–	2003	1
