= Massimo Bruno =

Belgian footballer (born 1993)

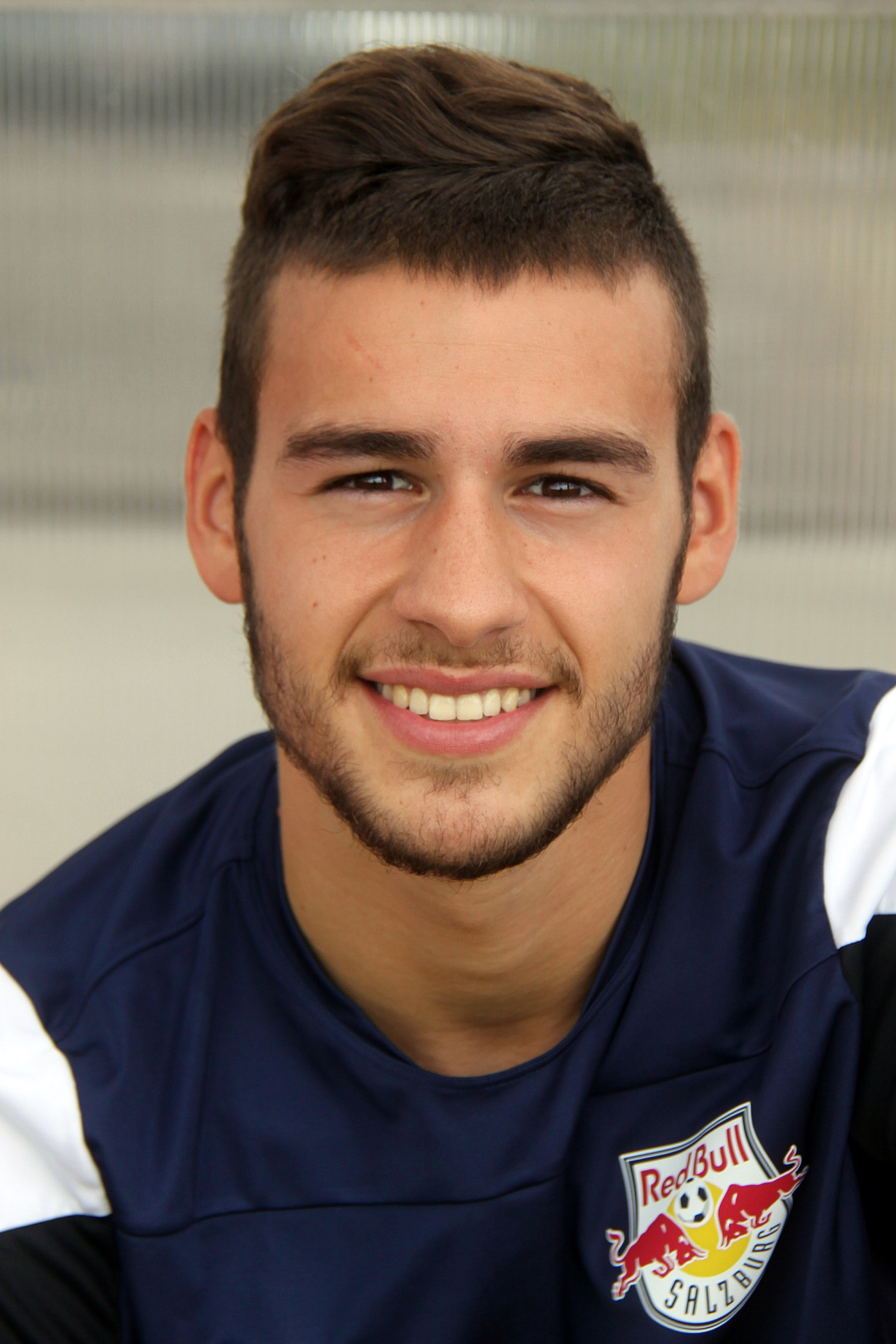

Personal information
- Date of birth: 17 September 1993 (age 33)
- Place of birth: Boussu, Belgium
- Height: 1.78 m (5 ft 10 in)
- Position: Winger

Youth career
- 1999–2000: RSB Frameries
- 2000–2002: Mons
- 2002–2006: Anderlecht
- 2006–2009: Mons
- 2009–2010: Charleroi

Senior career*
Years	Team	Apps	(Gls)
2010–2011	Charleroi	1	(0)
2011–2014	Anderlecht	55	(13)
2014–2018	RB Leipzig	25	(2)
2014–2015	→ Red Bull Salzburg (loan)	24	(6)
2016–2018	→ Anderlecht (loan)	45	(6)
2018–2021	Charleroi	78	(10)
2021–2022	Bursaspor	28	(6)
2022–2025	Kortrijk	63	(4)
2025–2026	Francs Borains	26	(3)

International career
2009–2010	Belgium U17	15	(1)
2010–2011	Belgium U18	11	(1)
2011–2012	Belgium U19	10	(3)
2012–2014	Belgium U21	13	(0)
- * Club domestic league appearances and goals

Massimo Bruno (born 17 September 1993) is a Belgian former footballer who played as a right winger.

== Club career ==
=== Charleroi ===
Born in Boussu, Belgium, Bruno started his football career at RSB Frameries before he moved to Mons. Bruno joined Anderlecht when he was eight years old. Bruno was progressing well at the club until he suffered "a growth spurt and was injured in the heel" and was out for four months. After making a recovery from his injury, however, Anderlecht released Bruno and he returned to Mons. Bruno then joined Charleroi, where he would begin his professional career. After progressing through the ranks at the club, Bruno was part of the squad for two league matches in November 2010, each time as an unused substitute. On 23 March 2011, he finally made his professional debut – and only appearance of the 2010–11 season – in a 3–0 loss to Cercle Brugge.

=== Anderlecht ===
On 23 May 2011, Bruno signed a three-year deal with Anderlecht, where he had previously played in the youth system. However, in his first season at the club, Bruno failed to appear in the first team and was featured in the club's reserves instead.

Ahead of the 2012–13 season, Bruno signed his first professional contract with Anderlecht. On 12 August 2012, he made his debut for the club, coming on as an 85th-minute substitute, in a 3–0 win against Cercle Brugge. On 28 August, coming off the bench, Bruno gave the assist for the winning goal against AEL Limassol, securing Anderlecht's place in the UEFA Champions League group stage. On 2 September 2012, he scored his first professional goal in a 2–2 draw against Genk. After the match, he described scoring against AEL Limassol and Genk as "a dream week" for him. Since then, Bruno became a first team regular for Anderlecht, playing in the right–wing position. On 18 September 2012 against Milan in a UEFA Champions League match, he produced good performances by "succeeding wonderfully with his many sprints" throughout the match, according to Het Nieuwsblad, as the club drew 0–0. Bruno scored four more goals in competitions by the end of the year against Boussu Dour Borinage, Gent, Club Brugge and Beerschot. On 20 November, he signed a contract extension with Anderlecht, keeping him at the club until 2017. Bruno scored three more goals in the second half of the season, including two consecutive goals against Charleroi and Club Brugge on 15 February 2013 and 24 February 2013 respectively. On 10 May 2013, he was awarded the club's player of the month. Despite being on the substitute bench in the last two matches of the season, Anderlecht went on to win the Belgian Pro League following a 1–1 against title contender, Zulte Waregem on the last matchday of the season. Despite facing competitions and his own injury concerns throughout the 2012–13 season, Bruno finished the season with 44 appearances and scoring 8 goals in all competitions.

In the Belgian Super Cup, Bruno scored the only goal of the game, in a 1–0 win over Genk to help Anderlecht win the cup. He started the 2013–14 season well by scoring five goals in the first month, including a brace against Cercle Brugge. Bruno continued to establish himself in the first team, playing in the right–wing position for the club. His performances led teammate Dennis Praet praising Bruno, saying: "There is no competition with Bruno for the best statistics. We sometimes laugh about it, but I can't catch up with him anymore." He later scored seven more goals by the end of the year, including two braces in the Belgian Cup matches against Eupen and Westerlo; and a UEFA Champions League match against Benfica. In May 2014, Bruno played in a striker in the remaining three matches for Anderlecht when he contributed to scoring three goals, resulting in the club winning the Belgian Pro League for the second time in a row. Despite suffering minor setbacks throughout the season, Bruno finished as Anderlecht's joint top-scorer along with Aleksandar Mitrović with 16 goals in all competitions as the club won the Pro League again.

=== RB Leipzig ===
==== Red Bull Salzburg (loan) ====
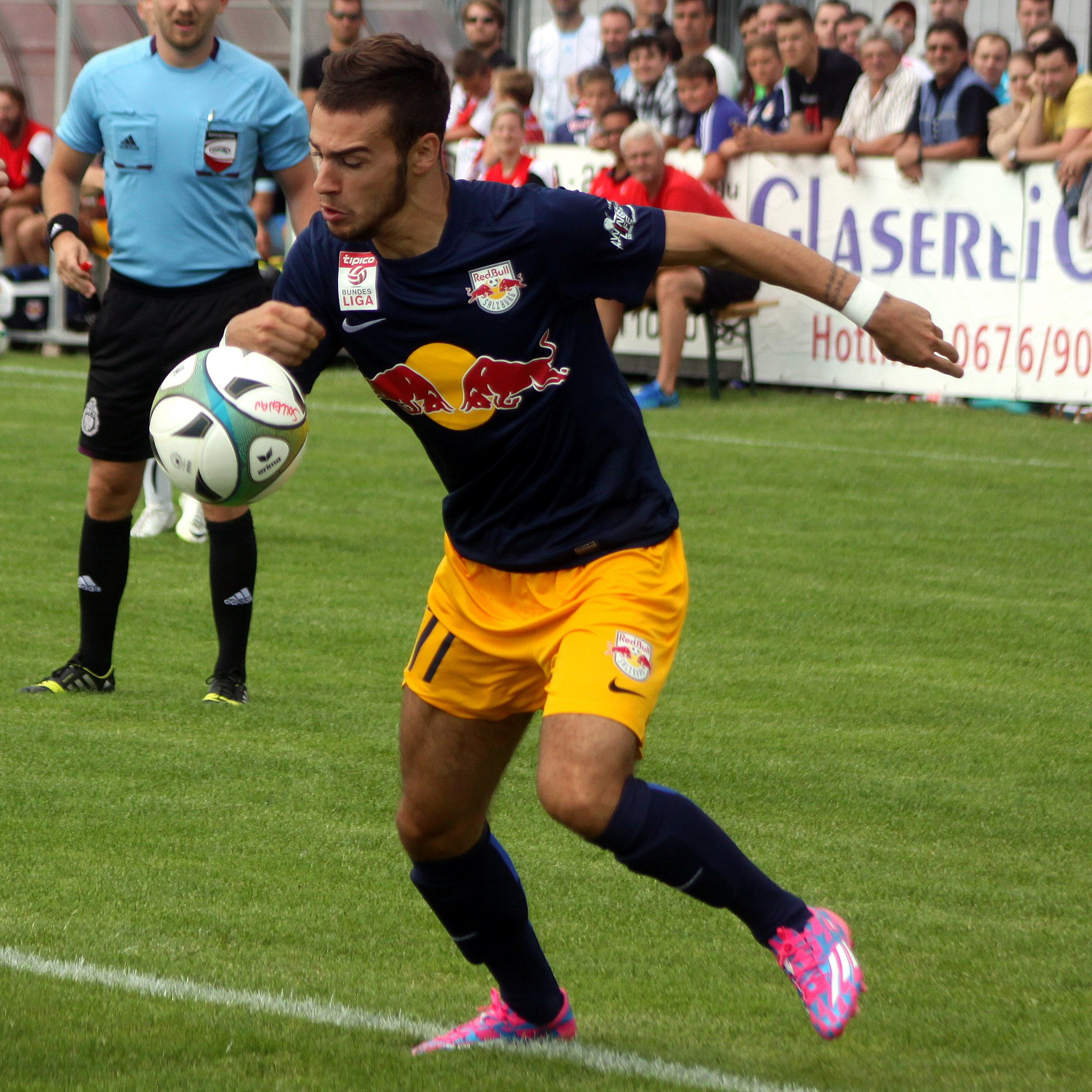
Massimo Bruno playing on his debut for Red Bull Salzburg in an Austrian Cup match against 1. SC Sollenau on 12 July 2014.

It was expected that Bruno would be leaving Anderlecht in the summer, according to his father. On 12 June 2014, he signed for RB Leipzig in the 2. Bundesliga and was immediately loaned to sister club Red Bull Salzburg for the 2014–15 season. The transfer fee reported to have cost 5 million euros after sporting director Ralf Rangnick said that Leipzig did not pay 9 million euros, which would have been the club's transfer record at the time. He was previously linked with a move to Bundesliga side 1899 Hoffenheim. Rangnick defended his decision to immediately loaning Bruno out, saying: "It's a very common practice in international football."

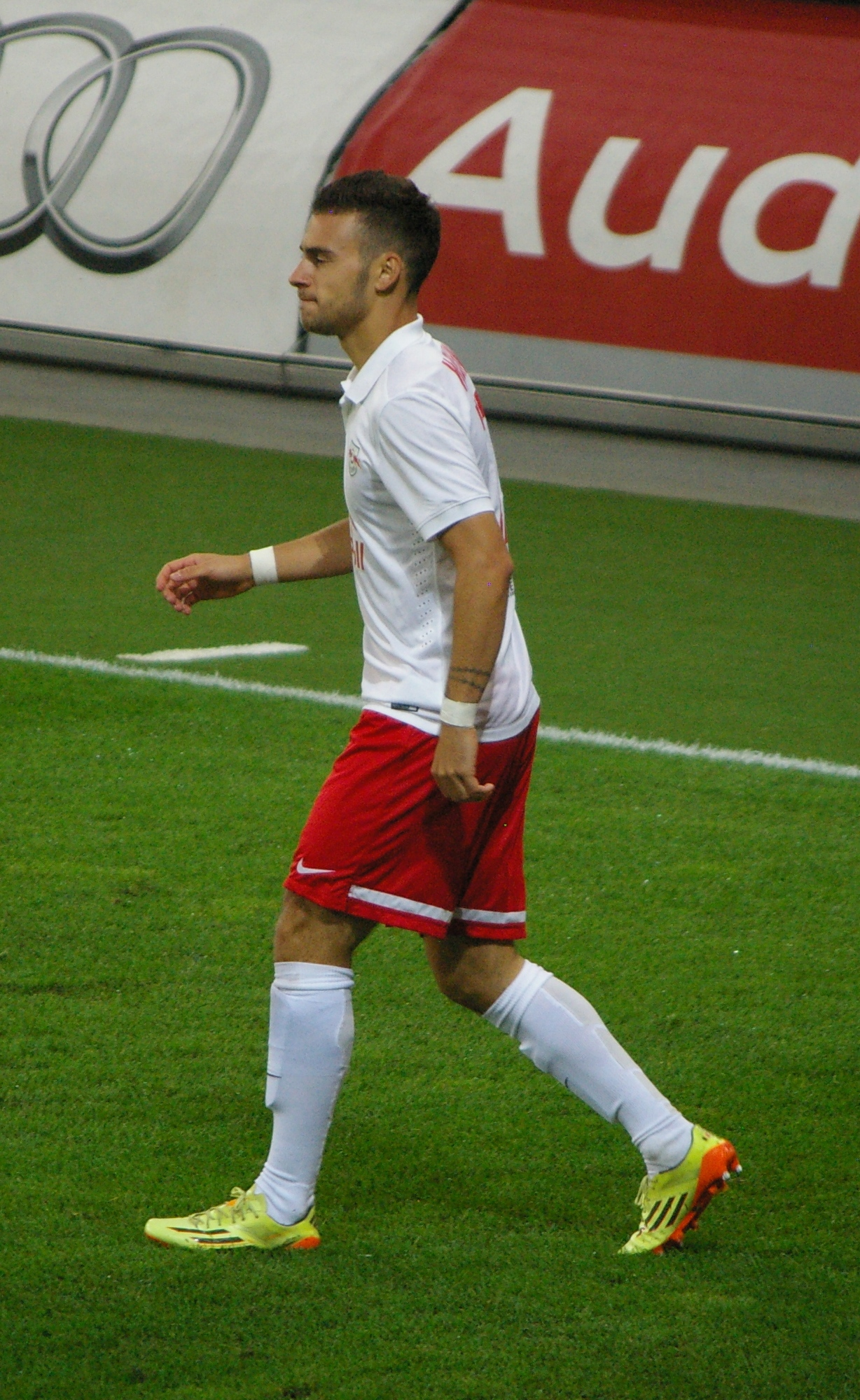
Bruno playing for Red Bull Salzburg in a UEFA Champions League match against Qarabağ on 6 August 2014.

He made his debut for Red Bull Salzburg, coming on as a substitute in the 66th minute and setting up the ninth goal of the game for the club, in a 10–1 win over 1. SC Sollenau in the first round of the Austrian Cup. Bruno scored his first goal for the club in the last minute of the 2–0 win against SV Ried on 2 August 2014. He scored two more goals by the end of August, scoring against Admira Wacker Mödling and Rheindorf Altach. Since joining the club, Bruno became a first team regular, playing and rotating in different positions in midfield, such as, attacking, left–wing and right–wing. He then scored two goals in two matches in all competitions between 24 September 2014 and 28 September 2014 against Wiener Sport-Club and Rapid Wien respectively. After suffering an abdominal muscle problems, Bruno scored three goals in three matches in all competitions between 7 November 2014 and 23 November 2014 against Dinamo Zagreb, Rheindorf Altach and Sturm Graz. In his single season with the club, Bruno helped Salzburg to the domestic double, recording 39 total appearances and scoring eight goals. Following his season with Red Bull Salzburg, it was announced that Bruno would be returning to RB Leipzig.

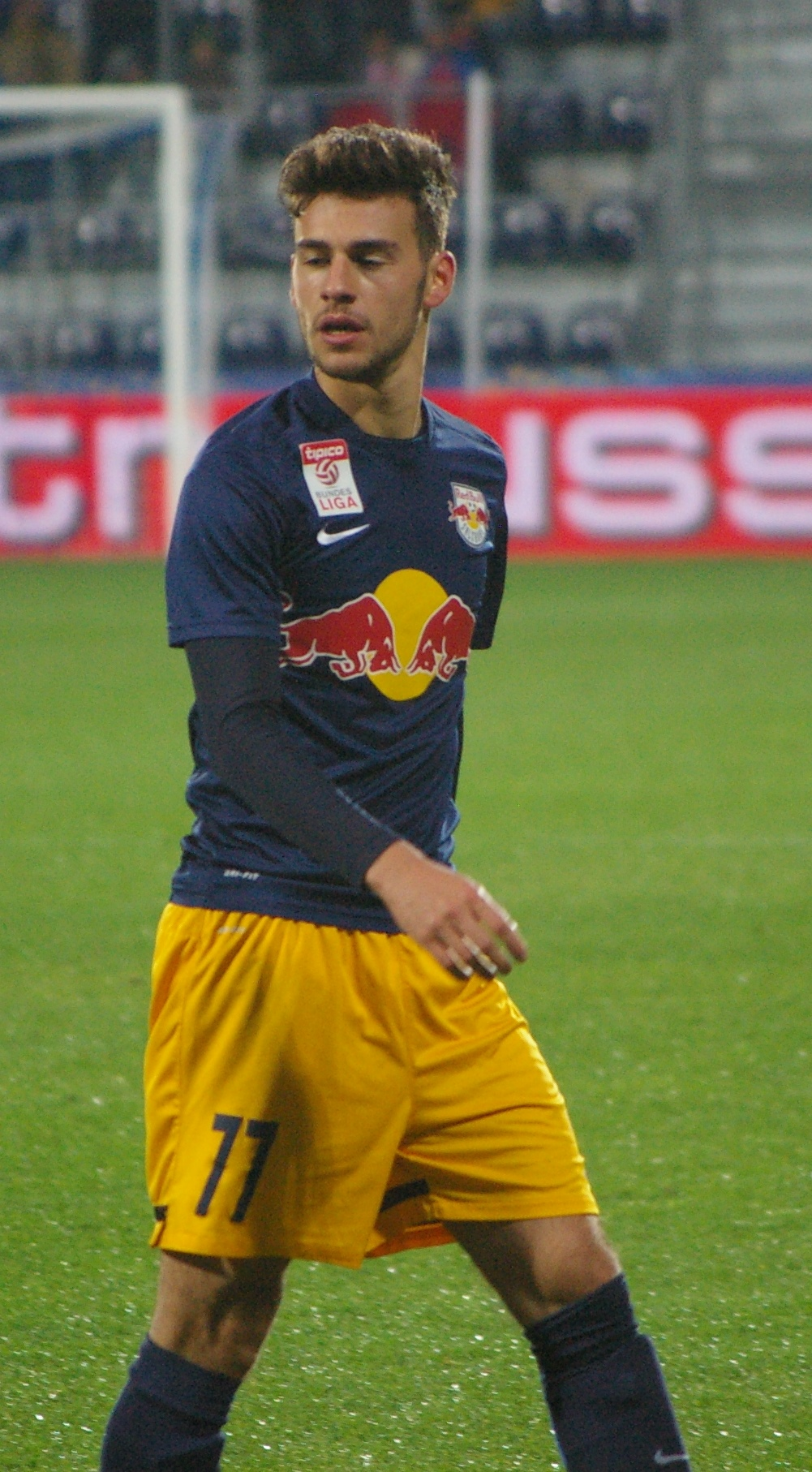
Bruno playing for Red Bull Salzburg in a semi-finals of the Austrian Cup match against SV Grödig on 28 April 2015.

==== Return to RB Leipzig ====
Returning to RB Leipzig, competing in 2. Bundesliga in the 2015–16 season, Bruno made his debut for the club as a 64th-minute substitute in a 1–0 win against FSV Frankfurt in the opening game of the season. Since joining RB Leipzig, Bruno quickly became a first team regular, playing and rotating in different positions in midfield, such as, attacking, left–wing and right–wing. However, he was dropped from the squad and didn't play in the first team throughout November, due to tactical reasons. During this time, Bruno started the whole game for the club's reserve match in a 2–1 loss against Berliner FC Dynamo on 23 November 2015. On 6 December 2015, he returned to starting line–up against MSV Duisburg and set up RB Leipzig's fourth goal of the game, in a 4–2 win. Following his return to the first team, Bruno found himself in and out of the starting line–up later in the season, he faced competitions in the midfield position and his own injury concerns. On 2 April 2016, he scored his first goals for the club in a 3–1 win against VfL Bochum. On 8 May 2016, Bruno came on as a 79th-minute substitute and helped the club win 2–0 against Karlsruher SC to seal their first-ever promotion to the Bundesliga. At the end of the 2015–16 season, he had made 26 appearances and scored two goals in all competitions.

On 27 August 2016, Bruno made his Bundesliga debut, coming on as an 86th-minute substitute in a 1–1 draw against Hoffenheim in what turned out to be his only appearance in the 2016–17 season. Two years later on 2 August 2018, he made his only appearance of the 2018–19 season against BK Häcken in the second leg of the UEFA Europa League's second qualifying round and scored the equalising goal, in a 1–1 draw and saw RB Leipzig through to the next round, in what turned out to be last appearance for the club.

==== Return to Anderlecht (loan) ====
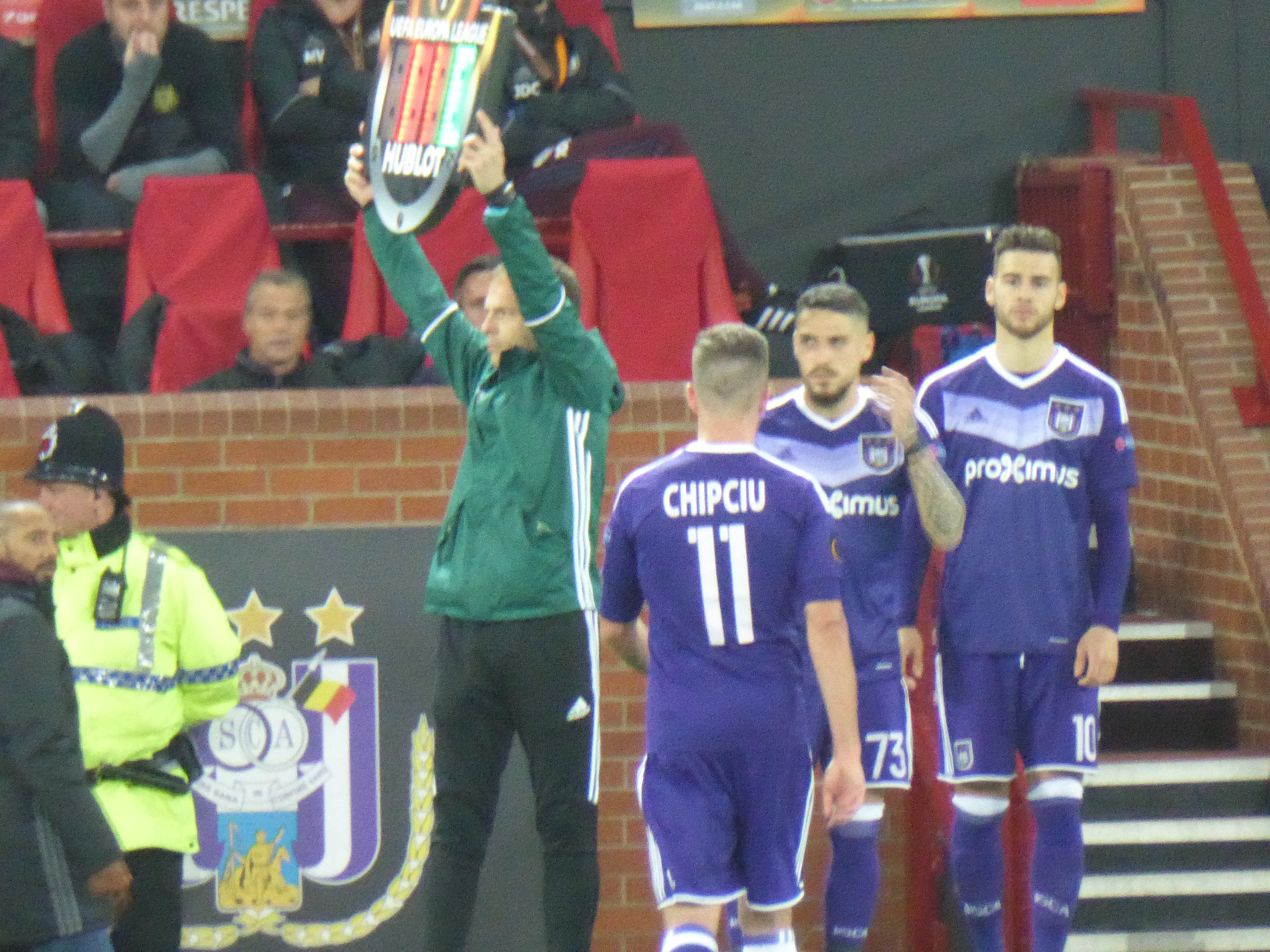
Bruno (wearing a number ten shirt) about to come on as a substitute during Anderlecht's UEFA Europa League match against Manchester United.

On 31 August 2016, Bruno returned to his former club Anderlecht on loan for the rest of the 2016–17 season. On 11 September 2016, he made his second debut for the club, coming on as a 79th-minute substitute in a 3–2 win against Charleroi. Since re-joining Anderlecht, Bruno found himself alternating between a starting and a substitute role throughout the 2016–17 season. On 3 November 2016, he scored his first goal for the club in two years, in a 6–1 win against 1. FSV Mainz 05 in the UEFA Europa League. After the match, Bruno said he hoped to have more opportunities to prove himself instead of sitting on the bench. Bruno added two more goals in all competitions by the end of November, scoring against Gabala and Royal Excel Mouscron. On 18 May 2017, he came on as a 77th-minute substitute and scored Anderlecht's third goal of the game to win 3–1 over Charleroi, which helped the club to the Pro League title for the first time in three years. Despite missing one match because of injury, Bruno made 39 appearances and scored six goals in all competitions during his first loan spell at Anderlecht.

On 1 July 2017, Bruno's loan at Anderlecht was extended for the 2017–18 season. On 20 August 2017, he scored his first goal of the season, in a 3–2 loss against Sint-Truidense. On 18 November 2017, Bruno scored his second goal of the season, in a 2–1 win against Royal Excel Mouscron. This was followed up by providing a hat–trick assists, in a 4–0 win against K.V. Kortrijk. However, he was unable to establish himself in the first team, due to injuries and facing competitions in the midfield position that resulted in him being placed on the substitute bench. However, Anderlecht finished the season in third place behind Club Brugge and Standard Liège, and Bruno finished the campaign with 23 appearances and two goals in all competitions. After the season, it was confirmed that the club opted not to sign him on a permanent deal.

=== Return to Charleroi ===
On 31 August 2018, Bruno re–joined Charleroi, making his return to the club for the first time in seven years.

The following day he made his second debut for Charleroi, coming on as a 61st-minute substitute in a 3–1 win over Royal Excel Mouscron. Since joining the club, Bruno rotated in the first team, playing in different midfield positions, such as, attacking, left–wing and right–wing. On 10 November 2018, he scored on his return from injury, in a 2–1 win over Club Brugge. On 14 December 2018, Bruno came on as a 70th-minute substitute and set up an equalising goal for Victor Osimhen before he scored a goal for himself, winning 2–0 against Gent. In the first three months of 2019, Bruno scored two more goals for Charleroi, coming against Waasland-Beveren and Royal Antwerp. In the remaining two matches of the league's play–offs for the UEFA Europa League spot, he assisted three times; twice against Beerschot Wilrijk and once against Westerlo to help the club qualify for the semi–finals of the league's play–offs. On 22 May 2019, Bruno returned to the starting line–up from suspension, and set up the Charleroi ‘s equalising goal for Osimhen, in a 2–1 win against K.V. Kortrijk to help the club reach the final. In the final decider against Royal Antwerp for the UEFA Europa League spot, he started the match and set up Charleroi's second goal of the game, as the club loss 3–2. At the end of the 2018–19 season, Bruno made thirty–five appearances and scoring four times in all competitions.

In the opening game of the 2019–20 season, Bruno scored his first goal of the season, scoring a last minute equalising goal, in a 1–1 draw against Gent. Since the start of the season, he continued to rotate in the first team, playing in different midfield positions, such as, attacking, left–wing and right–wing. He later scored four goals in all competitions by the end of the year, coming against Waasland-Beveren, Cercle Brugge (twice in two different league matches) and Gent. On 11 February 2020, Bruno played a role to the match when he set up a winning goal for Mamadou Fall, in a 2–1 win against Mechelen, During the match, however, Bruno ruptured his cruciate ligaments and was substituted in the 87th minute. Bruno never played in the remaining matches of the 2019–20 season, all leading up to the COVID-19 pandemic, which the league was cancelled. He ended the season, making twenty–seven appearances and scoring five times in all competitions.

The start of the 2020–21 season saw Bruno continuing to recover from his injury and returned to training in October. On 7 December 2020, he returned from injury, coming on as an 86th-minute substitute, in a 0–0 draw against K.V. Kortrijk. On 15 December 2020, Bruno came on as an 80th-minute substitute, and scored a winning goal seven minutes later, in a 4–3 win against Cercle Brugge. Since returning from injury, his playing time came from the substitute for the rest of the season. At the end of the 2020–21 season, he made twenty appearances and scoring two times in all competitions. Following this, he was released by Charleroi after failing to reach an agreement to sign a contract with the club.

=== Bursaspor ===
On 14 August 2021, Bruno signed for TFF First League side Bursaspor.

On 23 August, he made his debut for the club, setting up the second goal of the game in a 2–1 loss to BB Erzurumspor. On 15 September, Bruno scored his first goal for Bursaspor in a 4–1 win against Samsunspor. Since joining the club, he became a first team regular for Bursaspor, playing in a winger position. Bruno scored his second goal for the club and set up one of the goals, in a 3–1 win against Boluspor on 17 October 2021. He then scored two more goals for Bursaspor by the end of the year, coming against İstanbulspor and Denizlispor. Bruno then scored his fifth goal for the club, in a 3–1 loss against Adanaspor on 8 January 2022.

However, he suffered a knee injury that saw him out for two months. It wasn't until on 20 March 2022 when Bruno made his return from injury, coming on as a 39th-minute substitute in a 2–1 win against Balıkesirspor. He then assisted three times in two matches between 1 May 2022 and 8 May 2022, including twice against Manisa. In a follow–up match against Bandırmaspor, Bruno scored his sixth goal for Bursaspor, in a 4–2 loss, which saw the club relegated. At the end of the 2021–22 season, he went on to make twenty–nine appearances and scoring six times in all competitions.

Shortly after the season ended, it was expected that Bruno would be leaving Bursaspor. He later described his time at the club as "disastrous", saying: "Everything was good there, the organization, the climate, the modern city, only the results were disappointing in relation to the quality of players we had. With Bursa we had to win on the final day to stay in the second division, we got stuck on a draw. No foreigners are allowed in the third division, so I definitely had to look for another club."

=== Kortrijk ===
On 29 June 2022, Bruno signed a three-year contract with Kortrijk.

He made his debut for the club, coming on as a second-half substitute, in a 2–1 loss against Royale Union Saint-Gilloise on 13 August 2022. However, Bruno suffered two separate injuries in the first four months to the season. He made his return from injury, coming on as a second-half substitute, in a 1–1 draw against Cercle Brugge on 29 October 2022. Bruno followed up the next two matches by scoring his first goals, including a brace against RWD Molenbeek. He later scored three more goals for Kortrijk. Since returning from injury, Bruno found himself alternating between a starting and a substitute role throughout the 2022–23 season. At the end of the 2022–23 season, he made twenty–five appearances and scoring six times in all competitions.

In the opening game of the 2023–24 season, Bruno set up one of the goals, in a 3–2 loss against Gent. However, he continued to find himself alternating between a starting and a substitute role throughout the 2023–24 season. Bruno acknowledged Kortrijk's performance that saw the club find themselves in a relegation zone. He scored his first goal of the season, in a 3–3 draw against Club Brugge on 30 January 2024. Bruno helped Kortrijk retain their Belgian Pro League status after the club beat Lommel 5–2 on aggregate in the final of the Promotion/relegation play-offs. At the end of the 2023–24 season, he made thirty–two appearances and scoring once in all competitions.

In the 2024–25 season, Bruno started five times out of the first six matches of the first month before being demoted to the substitute bench.

=== Francs Borains ===
On 8 September 2025, Bruno signed a one-year contract with his hometown club Francs Borains, with an optional second year. He announced retirement from playing in July 2026.

== International career ==
In May 2009, Bruno appeared two times for Belgium U16 against Portugal U16 and scored in the second leg, losing both matches. On 11 August 2009, he then made his Belgium U17 debut, starting a match and played 70 minutes before being substituted, in a 2–2 draw against Switzerland U17. On 29 August 2009, Bruno scored his first goal for the U17 national team, in a 2–1 win against Hungary U17. He later made fifteen appearances and scoring once for Belgium U17.

On 15 September 2010, Bruno made his debut for Belgium U18, coming on as a second-half substitute, in a 2–2 draw against Switzerland U18. On 17 March 2011, he scored his first goal for the U18 national team, in a 2–0 win against Estonia U18. Bruno later made eleven appearances and scoring once for Belgium U18. On 11 August 2011, he made his debut for Belgium U19, starting the whole game, in a 0–0 draw against Denmark U19. Bruno scored in the next two matches for the U19 national team, coming against Germany U19 and Turkey U19. On 28 May 2012, Bruno scored his third goal for Belgium U19, in a 2–1 loss against Spain U19. He made ten appearances and scoring three times for the U19 national team.

On 6 September 2012, Bruno made his debut for Belgium U21, starting a match and played 57 minutes before being substituted, in a 3–1 win against Norway U21. He had to wait until on 5 February 2013 to make another appearance for the U21 national team, coming on as a second-half substitute, in a 1–1 draw against Spain U21. Following this, Bruno made thirteen appearances for Belgium U21.

== Personal life ==
Bruno is of Italian descent through his parents. This would have made him eligible to play for Italy, His father, Afonso, was an amateur footballer and revealed that he was at the Heysel Stadium when the disaster happened, resulting in the deaths of 39 people but he escaped by running to the pitch for his own safety. Growing up, he supported Juventus and idolised Zinedine Zidane.

Bruno is a cousin of footballer Leandro Zorbo.

== Career statistics ==
As of 17 April 2021.

Club	Season	League			National Cup		Europe		Other		Total	
Club	Season	Division	Apps	Goals	Apps	Goals	Apps	Goals	Apps	Goals	Apps	Goals
Charleroi	2010–11	Belgian Pro League	1	0	0	0	—		—		1	0
Anderlecht	2011–12	Belgian Pro League	0	0	0	0	0	0	—		0	0
Anderlecht	2012–13	Belgian Pro League	26	6	5	1	6 (Note: Appearances in UEFA Champions League)	0	8 (Note: Appearances in Belgian Pro League play-offs)	1	44	8
Anderlecht	2013–14	Belgian Pro League	29	7	2	4	3	1	8 (Note: One appearance in Belgian Super Cup, seven appearances in Belgian Pro League play-offs)	3	42	16
Anderlecht	Total		55	13	7	5	9	1	16	4	86	24
Red Bull Salzburg (loan)	2014–15	Austrian Bundesliga	24	6	4	1	11 (Note: Four appearances in UEFA Champions League, seven appearances and one goal in UEFA Europa League)	1	—		39	8
RB Leipzig	2015–16	2. Bundesliga	24	2	2	0	—		—		26	2
RB Leipzig	2016–17	Bundesliga	1	0	0	0	—		—		1	0
RB Leipzig	Total		25	2	2	0	0	0	0	0	27	2
Anderlecht (loan)	2016–17	Belgian First Division A	28	4	2	0	9 (Note: Appearances in UEFA Europa League)	2	—		39	6
Anderlecht (loan)	2017–18	Belgian First Division A	17	2	2	0	4	0	0	0	23	2
Anderlecht (loan)	Total		45	6	4	0	13	2	0	0	62	8
Charleroi	2018–19	Belgian First Division A	23	4	1	0	—		11	0	35	4
Charleroi	2019–20	Belgian First Division A	25	4	2	1	—		—		27	5
Charleroi	2020–21	Belgian First Division A	18	2	2	0	0	0	—		20	2
Charleroi	Total		66	10	5	1	0	0	11	0	82	11
Career total			216	37	22	7	33	4	27	4	297	53

== Honours ==
=== Club ===
Anderlecht

- Belgian Pro League: 2012–13, 2013–14, 2016–17
- Belgian Super Cup: 2013, 2017

Red Bull Salzburg

- Austrian Bundesliga: 2014–15
- Austrian Cup: 2014–15
