= Leander Dendoncker =

Belgian footballer (born 1995)

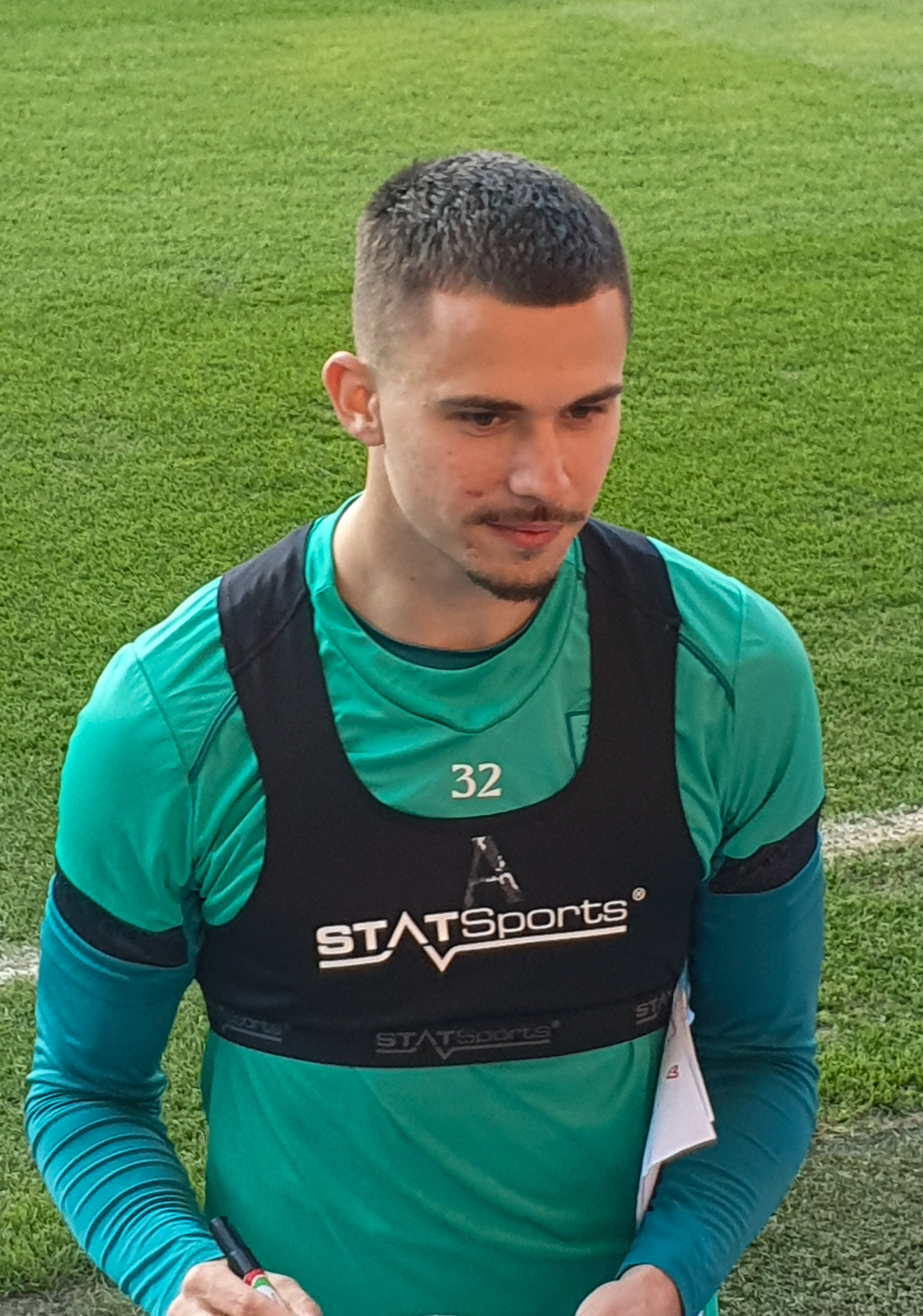
- Dendoncker with Anderlecht in 2025

Personal information
- Full name: Leander Dendoncker
- Date of birth: 15 April 1995 (age 31)
- Place of birth: Passendale, Belgium
- Height: 1.88 m (6 ft 2 in)
- Positions: Defensive midfielder; centre-back

Team information
- Current team: Hajduk Split
- Number: 18

Youth career
- 2001–2003: FC Passendale
- 2003–2009: Roeselare
- 2009–2013: Anderlecht

Senior career*
Years	Team	Apps	(Gls)
2013–2019	Anderlecht	125	(9)
2018–2019	→ Wolverhampton Wanderers (loan)	19	(2)
2019–2022	Wolverhampton Wanderers	105	(7)
2022–2025	Aston Villa	28	(1)
2024	→ Napoli (loan)	3	(0)
2024–2025	→ Anderlecht (loan)	30	(2)
2025–2026	Oviedo	19	(1)
2026–	Hajduk Split	2	(0)

International career
2010–2011	Belgium U16	10	(0)
2011–2012	Belgium U17	8	(2)
2013–2014	Belgium U19	9	(0)
2014–2015	Belgium U21	5	(3)
2015–2023	Belgium	32	(1)
Medal record
Men's football
Representing Belgium
FIFA World Cup
Third place	2018 Russia
- * Club domestic league appearances and goals as of 21 February 2026 (UTC)

Leander Dendoncker (born 15 April 1995) is a Belgian professional footballer who plays as a defensive midfielder or centre-back for Croatian Football League club Hajduk Split.

Dendoncker joined Anderlecht in 2009 and made his professional debut in July 2013, going on to play 171 matches and score eleven goals for the club as well as winning two Belgian Super Cups and a Belgian Pro League title. In 2018, he signed for newly-promoted Premier League side Wolverhampton Wanderers on loan, before transferring permanently for €15 million the following season. After making 159 appearances and scoring twelve goals for the club, Dendoncker moved to fellow Premier League side Aston Villa in September 2022 for an undisclosed fee. After brief loan spells with Serie A club Napoli and a return to Anderlecht in 2024, he transferred to Spanish club Real Oviedo permanently in August 2025.

Having represented Belgium at youth and senior level, Dendoncker made his senior international debut for Belgium in June 2015. He was part of their squad that finished third at the 2018 FIFA World Cup, also featuring at UEFA Euro 2020 and the 2022 World Cup.

== Club career ==
=== Anderlecht ===
Dendoncker transferred from K.S.V. Roeselare to R.S.C. Anderlecht in 2009, choosing that club ahead of Standard Liège, Club Brugge and K.R.C. Genk. After performances for the youth team in the NextGen Series and a training camp in Turkey, he was incorporated into the first team in January 2013. He said at the time that he modelled his game on that of the Spanish midfielder Sergio Busquets.

He made his professional debut on 21 July in the 2013 Belgian Super Cup, replacing Dennis Praet for the final nine minutes of the 1–0 win over Genk at the Constant Vanden Stock Stadium. On 26 September, he extended his contract until 2016.

However, it was not until 1 August 2014 that he debuted in the Belgian Pro League, on the first day of the season away to KV Oostende. After scoring his first professional goal on 18 January 2015 in a 3–0 win at Lierse S.K., Dendoncker was praised by former Anderlecht player Paul Van Himst, who said that there was no better player at his position in the club. He played six matches in the 2014–15 Belgian Cup, which his team lost 2–1 in the final to Brugge.

Anderlecht won the 2016–17 Belgian First Division A. Dendoncker scored five goals along the way, including two on 18 December in a 4–0 home win over K.A.S. Eupen. He also played all 16 games in their European campaign that season, which ended with elimination by eventual winners Manchester United in the quarter-finals of the UEFA Europa League. In the first leg of that tie on 13 April 2017, he scored a late equaliser in a 1–1 draw.

=== Wolverhampton Wanderers ===
On 9 August 2018, Dendoncker moved to newly promoted English Premier League club Wolverhampton Wanderers on an initial season-long loan with an obligation on Wolves to make the player a permanent Wolves signing in summer 2019. He made his debut on 28 August in the second round of the EFL Cup away to Sheffield Wednesday (2–0 victory), with coach Nuno Espírito Santo making nine changes from the previous game. In late September, The Football Association rejected the obligatory purchase clause in Dendoncker's Wolves contract and made his deal permanent for €15 million.

He finally made a league appearance on 5 December in a 2–1 win against Chelsea, playing the final nine minutes in place of goalscorer Raúl Jiménez, and scored his first Premier League goal on his sixth appearance in the competition, in a 1–3 win at Everton on 2 February 2019.

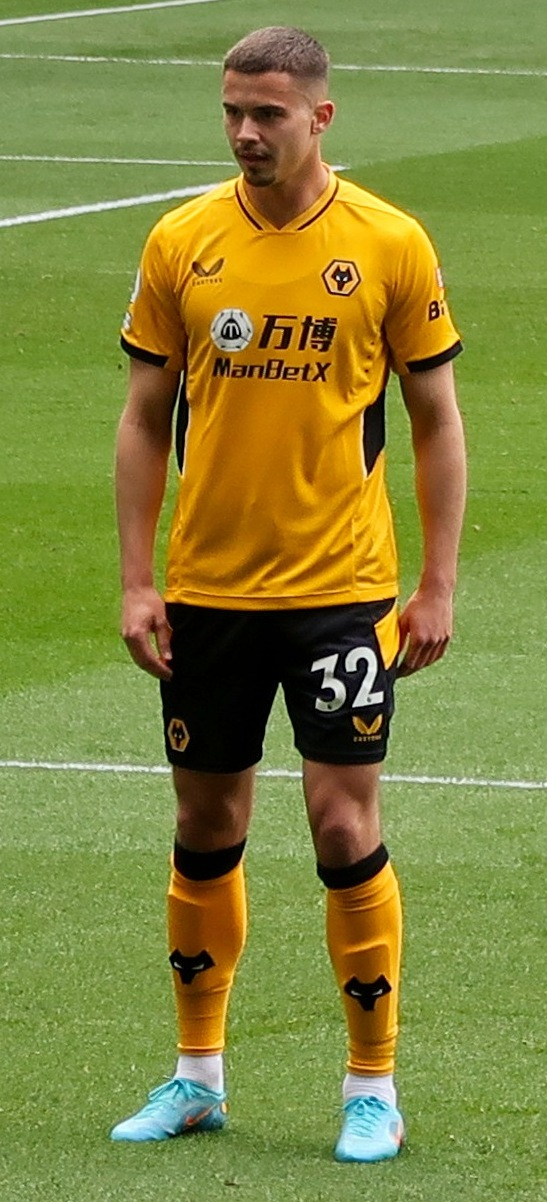
Dendoncker with Wolves in April 2022

Dendoncker committed a foul in the Wolves penalty area with just 180 seconds remaining of their April 2019 FA Cup semi-final with Watford while leading 2–1, thereby conceded the penalty that enabled the opponents to draw the game and then win in extra time. On 4 May he scored the only goal of a home win over Fulham, which enabled Wolves to make the Europa League as a result of Watford losing the cup final.

Dendoncker became a permanent Wolves signing on 1 July 2019, his original loan agreement having included an obligation on the club to sign him permanently at the end of the original season-long loan period. Following the introduction of Video Assistant Referees (VAR) by the Premier League for the 2019–20 season, he was the first Wolves player to have a 'goal' ruled out using VAR in a league match during Wolves' opening fixture away to Leicester City on 11 August.

On 14 December 2020, it was announced by Wolverhampton Wanderers that Dendoncker had extended his contract with the club until 2023, with an option of a further twelve months available to the club. He made his 100th competitive appearance for the club in an FA Cup 4th Round tie away to non-league Chorley the following 22 January, a game Wolves won 1–0. He scored his first goal of the 2020–21 season at home to West Ham United in a 3–2 loss on 5 April 2021. He scored his first goal in the 2021–22 Premier League season in 2–0 win away to Tottenham Hotspur on 13 February 2022.

=== Aston Villa ===
On 1 September 2022, 27-year-old Dendoncker moved to fellow West Midlands-based Premier League club Aston Villa for a fee of around £13 million. He made his debut 15 days later, as a 67th-minute substitute for Jacob Ramsey in a 1–0 home victory over Southampton. He was mainly used as a substitute in his first season, and missed out on games altogether, and manager Unai Emery said that it was because of "a problem at home"; he was absent from all of March 2023 with a hand injury.

Dendoncker scored his first goal for Aston Villa on 26 December 2023, his team's second in a 3–2 defeat away at Old Trafford against Manchester United.

==== Loan to Napoli ====
On 26 January 2024, Dendoncker was sent to Serie A club Napoli on loan until the end of the season, with the option to buy for around £8 million at the end of the loan. He made his Napoli debut two days later in a 0–0 draw at Lazio. On 30 June, Napoli confirmed that they would not be agreeing to the option to sign Dendoncker permanently, and he would subsequently return to his parent club Aston Villa.

==== Loan to Anderlecht ====
On 31 August 2024, Dendoncker returned to Anderlecht on loan until the end of the season. Both clubs agreed on a purchase option, but the amount was undisclosed. At the end of his loan, the Belgian club decided not to act on the purchase option and Dendoncker returned to Aston Villa once again.

=== Real Oviedo ===
On 19 August 2025, Dendoncker signed for newly promoted La Liga club Real Oviedo permanently for an undisclosed fee. Despite the official statement on the transfer stating there was an undisclosed fee, media reported that it was actually a free transfer with Aston Villa keen to rid themselves of Dendoncker's wages.

== International career ==
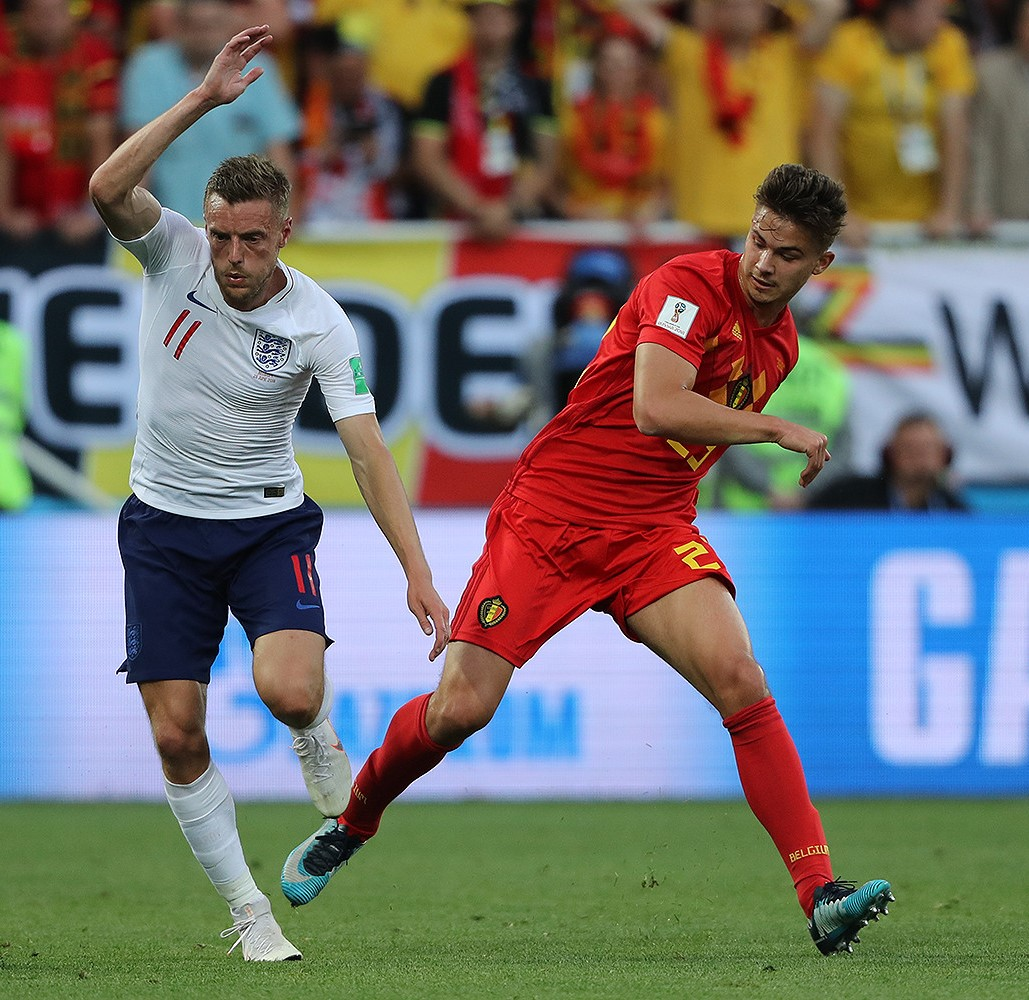
Dendoncker (right) and England's Jamie Vardy at the 2018 FIFA World Cup

At the age of 20 on 22 May 2015, Dendoncker received his first call-up to the Belgium national football team by coach Marc Wilmots, along with his Anderlecht teammate Youri Tielemans. He made his debut on 7 June in an away friendly match against France, replacing Jason Denayer for the final five minutes of a 4–3 victory.

On 4 June 2018, coach Roberto Martínez named Dendoncker in Belgium's 23-man squad for the 2018 FIFA World Cup in Russia. He made his tournament debut on 29 June in a 1–0 victory against England at the Kaliningrad Stadium, with both teams fielding unfamiliar teams having already advanced to the last 16.

In May 2021, Dendoncker was named in Martínez's 26-man Belgian squad for the postponed UEFA Euro 2020. After starting the first two matches, he was replaced for the rest of the tournament for the quarter-finals once Axel Witsel recovered from injury.

On 8 June 2022, Dendoncker scored his first international goal in a 6–1 home victory against Poland in the Nations League. At the 2022 FIFA World Cup, he started Belgium's opening match against Canada in a three-man defence alongside veterans Jan Vertonghen and Toby Alderweireld in a 1–0 victory. Dendoncker was dropped out in a 2–0 defeat against Morocco. He returned to the starting line-up in a goalless draw against Croatia, which led the Belgians to be eliminated from the group stage.

== Personal life ==
Dendoncker was born in Passendale, West Flanders, to pig farming parents. He is the middle of three footballing sons: younger brother Lars was on the books of Club Brugge KV before moving to Brighton & Hove Albion in 2020, while older Andres played local football and became an agent for his siblings. Lars retired at age 22 in 2023, due to a heart condition.

Dendoncker moved to Brussels to play for Anderlecht while in their under-15 team and suffered from homesickness while adjusting to the difference between a largely white rural setting and a diverse urban environment. He attended the Sint-Guido-Instituut school in Anderlecht at the time that it was being filmed for the fly-on-the-wall documentary De School van Lukaku (Lukaku's School) focusing on his teammate Romelu Lukaku.

Dendoncker speaks four languages fluently; English, French, Spanish and Dutch. He has noted that he speaks in West Flemish to his family, but the Brabantian dialect when doing interviews for Anderlecht.

== Career statistics ==
=== Club ===
As of match played 21 February 2026

Appearances and goals by club, season and competition
Club	Season	League			National cup (Note: Includes Belgian Cup, FA Cup)		League cup (Note: Includes EFL Cup)		Europe		Other		Total	
Club	Season	Division	Apps	Goals	Apps	Goals	Apps	Goals	Apps	Goals	Apps	Goals	Apps	Goals
Anderlecht	2013–14	Belgian Pro League	0	0	1	0	—		0	0	1 (Note: Appearance in Belgian Super Cup)	0	2	0
Anderlecht	2014–15	Belgian Pro League	26	2	6	0	—		6 (Note: Four appearances in UEFA Champions League, two appearances in UEFA Europa League)	0	0	0	38	2
Anderlecht	2015–16	Belgian Pro League	23	1	1	1	—		6 (Note: Appearances in UEFA Europa League)	0	—		30	2
Anderlecht	2016–17	Belgian Pro League	40	5	1	0	—		16 (Note: Two appearances in UEFA Champions League, fourteen appearances and one goal in UEFA Europa League)	1	—		57	6
Anderlecht	2017–18	Belgian Pro League	36	1	2	0	—		6 (Note: Appearances in UEFA Champions League)	0	0	0	44	1
Anderlecht	Total		125	9	11	1	—		34	1	1	0	171	11
Wolverhampton Wanderers (loan)	2018–19	Premier League	19	2	5	0	2	0	—		—		26	2
Wolverhampton Wanderers	2019–20	Premier League	38	4	2	0	0	0	17	2	—		57	6
Wolverhampton Wanderers	2020–21	Premier League	33	1	3	0	1	0	—		—		37	1
Wolverhampton Wanderers	2021–22	Premier League	30	2	2	0	2	1	—		—		34	3
Wolverhampton Wanderers	2022–23	Premier League	4	0	0	0	1	0	—		—		5	0
Wolverhampton Wanderers	Wolves total		124	9	12	0	6	1	17	2	—		159	12
Aston Villa	2022–23	Premier League	20	0	1	0	—		—		—		21	0
Aston Villa	2023–24	Premier League	8	1	1	0	1	0	5 (Note: Appearances in UEFA Europa Conference League)	0	—		15	1
Aston Villa	2024–25	Premier League	0	0	0	0	0	0	0	0	—		0	0
Aston Villa	Total		28	1	2	0	1	0	5	0	—		36	1
Napoli (loan)	2023–24	Serie A	3	0	—		—		0	0	—		3	0
Anderlecht (loan)	2024–25	Belgian Pro League	30	2	5	1	—		8	0	—		43	3
Oviedo	2025–26	La Liga	19	1	0	0	—		—		—		18	1
Career total			330	22	30	2	7	1	60	5	1	0	432	28

=== International ===
Appearances and goals by national team and year
National team	Year	Apps	Goals
Belgium	2015	1	0
Belgium	2016	1	0
Belgium	2017	2	0
Belgium	2018	2	0
Belgium	2019	3	0
Belgium	2020	3	0
Belgium	2021	12	0
Belgium	2022	7	1
Belgium	2023	1	0
Total		32	1

Belgium score listed first, score column indicates score after each Dendoncker goal.

List of international goals scored by Leander Dendoncker
No.	Date	Venue	Cap	Opponent	Score	Result	Competition
1	8 June 2022	King Baudouin Stadium, Brussels, Belgium	27	Poland	5–1	6–1	2022–23 UEFA Nations League A

== Honours ==
Anderlecht

- Belgian First Division A: 2016–17
- Belgian Super Cup: 2013, 2014

Belgium

- FIFA World Cup third place: 2018
