= 2013–14 RSC Anderlecht season =

R.S.C. Anderlecht
2013–14 season
- Chairman: Roger Vanden Stock
- Manager: John van den Brom (until 10 March); Besnik Hasi (from 10 March)
- Stadium: Constant Vanden Stock Stadium
- Belgian Pro League: 1st (champions)
- Belgian Super Cup: Winners
- Belgian Cup: Seventh round
- UEFA Champions League: Group stage
- Top goalscorer: League: Aleksandar Mitrović (16); All: Massimo Bruno (16) Aleksandar Mitrović (16)
- Highest home attendance: 26,112 vs Charleroi, Belgian Pro League, 25 August 2013
- Lowest home attendance: 10,000 vs AS Eupen, Belgian Cup, 25 September 2013
Home colours	Away colours	Third colours

The 2013–14 season is a season in Belgian Pro League played by R.S.C. Anderlecht, a Belgian football club based in Anderlecht, Brussels. The season covers the period from 1 July 2013 to 30 June 2014.

== Match results ==
League positions are sourced from Statto, while the remaining contents of each table are sourced from the references in the "Ref" column.

=== Belgian Pro League ===
==== Regular season ====
Pos	Team	Pld	W	D	L	GF	GA	GD	Pts	Qualification
1	Standard Liège	30	20	7	3	59	17	+42	67	Qualification for the Championship play-offs
2	Club Brugge	30	19	6	5	54	28	+26	63	Qualification for the Championship play-offs
3	Anderlecht	30	18	3	9	61	31	+30	57	Qualification for the Championship play-offs
4	Zulte Waregem	30	14	11	5	51	38	+13	53	Qualification for the Championship play-offs
5	Lokeren	30	15	6	9	48	31	+17	51	Qualification for the Championship play-offs

Source: Belgian Pro League
Rules for classification: 1) points; 2) number of matches won; if teams are still tied a playoff is organised.

Date	League position	Opponents	Venue	Result	Score F–A	Scorers	Attendance	Ref
28 July 2013	11th	Lokeren	H	L	2–3	Bruno 55', Gillet 76' pen.	26,000	
2 August 2013	1st	Cercle Brugge	A	W	4–0	Deschacht 7', Suárez 41', Bruno (2) 51', 57'	9,900	
11 August 2013	5th	Gent	H	W	4–1	Kljestan 32', Praet 34', Bruno 49', Acheampong 78'	24,000	
18 August 2013	5th	Waasland-Beveren	A	W	3–0	Kljestan 74', Acheampong 82', Gillet 90+2'	7,252	
25 August 2013	2nd	Sporting Charleroi	H	W	5–2	Suárez (3) 21', 32', 47', Nuytinck 57', Bruno 75'	26,112	
1 September 2013	5th	Zulte-Waregem	A	L	3–4	Kljestan 18', Suárez 59', de Zeeuw 78'	9,489	
14 September 2013	4th	Mechelen	H	W	5–0	Mitrović (2) 2', 38', Kljestan 18', Suárez 41', Acheampong 89'	21,000	
22 September 2013	5th	Club Brugge	A	L	0–4		27,024	
29 September 2013	4th	Lierse	H	W	2–0	Gillet 65', Praet 84'	21,000	
6 October 2013	5th	Kortrijk	H	L	0–1		22,000	
18 October 2013	4th	Mons	A	W	2–0	Mitrović 29', Mbemba 45'	6,200	
27 October 2013	5th	Standard Liège	H	D	1–1	Kljestan 1'	26,000	
30 October 2013	5th	KV Oostende	A	W	3–0	Mitrović 45+1', Mbemba 71', Kljestan 73'	6,352	
2 November 2013	4th	OH Leuven	H	W	3–1	Kljestan 43', Mitrović (2) 44', 81'	20,000	
10 November 2013	4th	Genk	A	W	1–0	Mbemba 78'	24,236	
23 November 2013	4th	Sporting Charleroi	A	L	1–2	Gillet 73'	9,157	
1 December 2013	5th	Cercle Brugge	H	W	2–1	Bruno 30', Mitrović 86'	19,351	
7 December 2013	3rd	Waasland-Beveren	H	W	2–0	Mitrović 33', Vargas 65'	19,500	
15 December 2013	2nd	Gent	A	W	2–1	Bruno 60' pen., Mitrović 76'	19,866	
22 December 2013	3rd	Standard Liège	A	D	1–1	Praet 18'	27,489	
26 December 2013	2nd	Zulte-Waregem	H	W	1–0	Malanda 66' o.g.	20,000	
19 January 2014	2nd	Mechelen	A	L	1–2	Najar 2'	11,911	
26 January 2014	2nd	Club Brugge	H	W	2–0	Mitrović 39', N'Sakala 88'	20,300	
31 January 2014	2nd	Lierse	A	L	0–2		9,300	
8 February 2014	2nd	Kortrijk	A	D	2–2	Cyriac 76', Pollet 90+3'	9,214	
16 February 2014	3rd	Mons	H	W	2–0	Kljestan 37', Vargas 49'	20,000	
21 February 2014	3rd	Lokeren	A	L	1–2	Odoi 57' o.g.	9,093	
2 March 2014	3rd	Genk	H	W	2–0	Mitrović 63', Pollet 90+1'	20,100	
8 March 2014	3rd	OH Leuven	A	L	0–1		9,200	
16 March 2014	3rd	KV Oostende	H	W	4–0	Mitrović (2) 9' pen., 77', Najar 28', Deschacht 83'	21,000	

==== Championship playoff ====
Pos	Team	Pld	W	D	L	GF	GA	GD	Pts	Qualification
1	Anderlecht (C)	10	7	1	2	17	6	+11	51	Qualification for the Champions League group stage
2	Standard Liège	10	4	3	3	14	11	+3	49	Qualification for the Champions League third qualifying round
3	Club Brugge	10	5	1	4	16	11	+5	48	Qualification for the Europa League third qualifying round
4	Zulte Waregem	10	4	2	4	16	15	+1	41	Qualification for the Testmatches
5	Lokeren	10	2	2	6	14	25	−11	34	Qualification for the Europa League play-off round
6	Genk	10	2	3	5	10	19	−9	32	

Source: soccerway.com
Rules for classification: 1) points; 2) points after deduction of (possible) half points added due to rounding; 3) number of wins; 4) goal difference; 5) number of goals scored; 6) number of away goals scored; 7) number of away wins.
(C) Champions

Date	League position	Opponents	Venue	Result	Score F–A	Scorers	Attendance	Ref
30 March 2014	4th	Standard Liège	A	L	0–1		27,700	
6 April 2014	4th	Club Brugge	H	W	3–0	Tielemans 22', Cyriac (2) 32', 40'	19,000	
11 April 2014	2nd	Lokeren	A	W	2–1	Cyriac 6', Mitrović 60'	7,233	
15 April 2014	3rd	Zulte-Waregem	H	D	0–0		18,603	
21 April 2014	4th	Genk	A	L	0–1		21,430	
27 April 2014	3rd	Standard Liège	H	W	2–1	Mbemba 52', Mitrović 78'	23,000	
4 May 2014	2nd	Club Brugge	A	W	1–0	Meunier 86' o.g.	26,000	
11 May 2014	1st	Genk	H	W	4–0	Bruno (2) 16', 53', Najar 45', Praet 81'	21,000	
15 May 2014	1st	Zulte-Waregem	A	W	2–1	Kouyaté 15', Bruno 24'	9,482	
18 May 2014	1st	Lokeren	H	W	3–1	Mitrović 19', Mbemba 59', Praet 67'	22,000	

=== Belgian Super Cup ===
Round	Date	Opponents	Venue	Result	Score F–A	Scorers	Attendance	Ref
Final	21 July 2013	Genk	H	W	1–0	Bruno 45+1'	18,000	

=== Belgian Cup ===
Round	Date	Opponents	Venue	Result	Score F–A	Scorers	Attendance	Ref
Sixth round	25 September 2013	AS Eupen	H	W	7–0	Bruno (2) 5' pen., 52', de Zeeuw 23', Acheampong 35', Suárez 42', Tielemans 50', Cyriac 74'	10,000	
Seventh round	4 December 2013	Westerlo	A	D	2–2 (a.e.t.) (3–4 p)	Bruno (2) 48', 106'	7,500	

=== UEFA Champions League ===
==== Group stage ====
Pos	Team	Pld	W	D	L	GF	GA	GD	Pts	Qualification	PAR	OLY	BEN	AND
1	(France) Paris Saint-Germain	6	4	1	1	16	5	+11	13	Advance to knockout phase	—	2–1	3–0	1–1
2	(Greece) Olympiacos	6	3	1	2	10	8	+2	10 (Note: Head-to-head points: Olympiacos 4, Benfica 1.)	Advance to knockout phase	1–4	—	1–0	3–1
3	(Portugal) Benfica	6	3	1	2	8	8	0	10	Transfer to Europa League	2–1	1–1	—	2–0
4	(Belgium) Anderlecht	6	0	1	5	4	17	−13	1		0–5	0–3	2–3	—

Source: UEFA
Notes:

Round	Date	Opponents	Venue	Result	Score F–A	Scorers	Attendance	Ref
Group	17 September 2013	Benfica	A	L	0–2		29,393	
Group	2 October 2013	Olympiakos Piraeus	H	L	0–3		17,000	
Group	23 October 2013	PSG	H	L	0–5		18,465	
Group	5 November 2013	PSG	A	D	1–1	de Zeeuw 68'	43,091	
Group	27 November 2013	Benfica	H	L	2–3	Mbemba 18', Bruno 77'	16,780	
Group	10 December 2013	Olympiakos Piraeus	A	L	1–3	Kljestan 39'	31,444	

== Appearances and goals ==
As of match played 18 May 2014.

Numbers in parentheses denote appearances as substitute.
Players with names struck through and marked † left the club during the playing season.
Players with names in italics and marked * were on loan from another club with Anderlecht.
Key to positions: GK – Goalkeeper; DF – Defender; MF – Midfielder; FW – Forward

No.	Pos.	Nat.	Name	League		Super Cup		Cup		UEFA CL		Total		Discipline	
No.	Pos.	Nat.	Name	Apps	Goals	Apps	Goals	Apps	Goals	Apps	Goals	Apps	Goals	A yellow rectangle, denoting the yellow penalty card shown to a player being cautioned	A red rectangle, denoting the red penalty card shown to a player being sent off
1	GK	BEL	Silvio Proto	31	0	1	0	0	0	3	0	35	0	2	1
2	DF	COD	Fabrice N'Sakala	15 (3)	1	0	0	0 (1)	0	6	0	21 (4)	1	6	2
3	DF	BEL	Olivier Deschacht	28	2	1	0	2	0	2	0	33	2	4	1
6	MF	NED	Demy de Zeeuw *	6 (8)	1	1	0	1	1	2	1	10 (8)	3	3	0
7	FW	SWE	Samuel Armenteros	1 (1)	0	0 (1)	0	0	0	0	0	1 (2)	0	0	0
8	MF	SER	Luka Milivojević	13 (3)	0	0	0	1	0	3 (1)	0	17 (4)	0	8	0
9	FW	ARG	Matías Suárez	11	6	1	0	1	1	3	0	16	7	2	0
10	MF	BEL	Dennis Praet	31 (6)	5	1	0	1 (1)	0	5 (1)	0	38 (8)	5	3	0
11	FW	BEL	David Pollet	2 (10)	2	0	0	0	0	0	0	2 (10)	2	0	0
12	MF	HON	Andy Najar	23 (2)	3	0	0	1	0	1	0	25 (2)	3	1	0
13	GK	BEL	Thomas Kaminski	9 (1)	0	0	0	2	0	3	0	14 (1)	0	1	0
14	DF	NED	Bram Nuytinck	22 (1)	0	1	0	2	0	3 (2)	0	28 (3)	0	2	0
15	FW	CIV	Gohi Bi Cyriac	15 (12)	4	1	0	1 (1)	1	0 (2)	0	17 (15)	5	1	0
16	MF	SEN	Cheikhou Kouyaté	39	1	1	0	2	0	6	0	48	1	4	2
17	MF	BEL	Massimo Bruno	28 (8)	10	1	1	2	4	3	1	34 (8)	16	4	0
18	FW	GHA	Frank Acheampong	9 (15)	3	0	0	2	1	0 (6)	0	11 (21)	4	1	0
19	MF	USA	Sacha Kljestan	21 (2)	8	1	0	1	0	5	1	28 (2)	9	5	1
22	DF	COD	Chancel Mbemba	31 (4)	5	0	0	0	0	5	1	36 (4)	6	4	0
23	GK	BEL	Xavier Gies	0	0	0	0	0	0	0	0	0	0	0	0
24	DF	BEL	Michaël Heylen	0	0	0	0	0	0	0	0	0	0	0	0
26	GK	COD	Mulopo Kudimbana *	0	0	0	0	0	0	0	0	0	0	0	0
29	MF	ESP	Fede Vico	0	0	0	0	0	0	0	0	0	0	0	0
30	MF	BEL	Guillaume Gillet	26 (7)	4	1	0	0	0	5	0	32 (7)	4	4	0
31	MF	BEL	Youri Tielemans	21 (8)	1	0	0	2	1	2 (2)	0	25 (10)	2	2	0
32	MF	BEL	Leander Dendoncker	0	0	0 (1)	0	0 (1)	0	0	0	0 (2)	0	0	0
33	GK	BEL	Davy Roef	0 (1)	0	0	0	0	0	0	0	0 (1)	0	0	0
34	MF	MAR	Nabil Jaadi	0	0	0	0	0	0	0	0	0	0	0	0
35	MF	BEL	Samy Bourard	0	0	0	0	0	0	0	0	0	0	0	0
36	FW	COL	Oswal Álvarez	0	0	0	0	0	0	0	0	0	0	0	0
37	DF	BEL	Jordan Lukaku	0 (2)	0	0 (1)	0	0	0	0	0	0 (3)	0	0	0
38	FW	BEL	Andy Kawaya	0	0	0	0	0 (1)	0	0	0	0 (1)	0	0	0
39	DF	BEL	Anthony Vanden Borre	26 (1)	0	0	0	1	0	3	0	30 (1)	0	8	2
45	FW	SRB	Aleksandar Mitrović	29 (3)	16	0	0	0 (1)	0	6	0	35 (4)	16	8	2
55	MF	BRA	Fernando Canesin	0	0	0	0	0	0	0	0	0	0	0	0
70	MF	VEN	Ronald Vargas	4 (6)	2	0	0	0	0	0 (1)	0	4 (7)	2	1	0
