= Youri Tielemans =

Belgian footballer (born 1997)

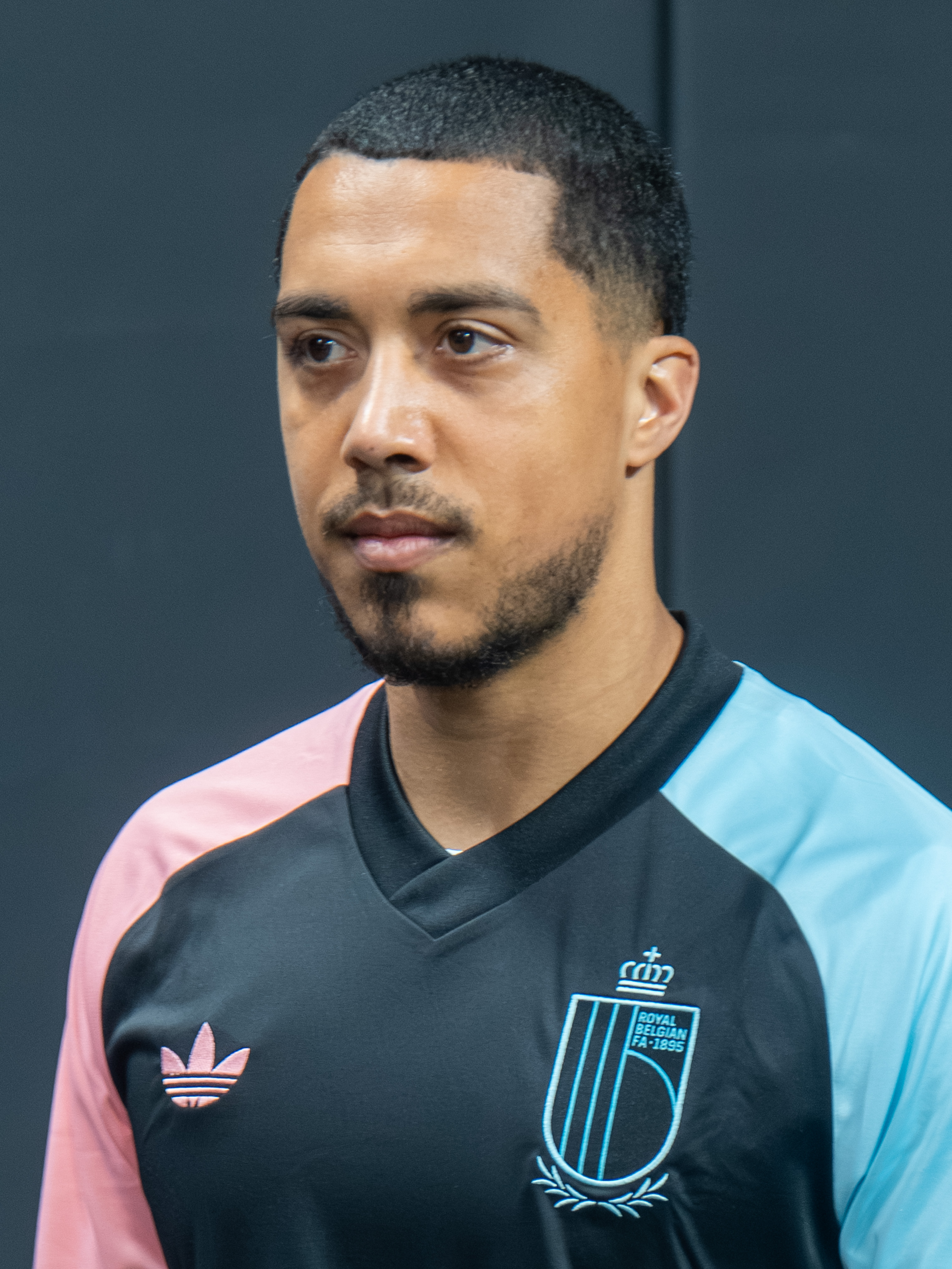
- Tielemans with Belgium in 2026

Personal information
- Full name: Youri Marion A. Tielemans
- Date of birth: 7 May 1997 (age 29)
- Place of birth: Sint-Pieters-Leeuw, Flemish Brabant, Belgium
- Height: 1.76 m (5 ft 9 in)
- Position: Midfielder

Team information
- Current team: Manchester United
- Number: 18

Youth career
- –2013: Anderlecht

Senior career*
Years	Team	Apps	(Gls)
2013–2017	Anderlecht	139	(26)
2017–2019	Monaco	47	(5)
2019	→ Leicester City (loan)	13	(3)
2019–2023	Leicester City	138	(18)
2023–2026	Aston Villa	93	(5)
2026–	Manchester United	10	(1)

International career^{‡}
2012–2013	Belgium U15	4	(2)
2012–2013	Belgium U16	10	(8)
2013–2016	Belgium U21	14	(6)
2016–	Belgium	95	(15)
Medal record
Men's football
Representing Belgium
FIFA World Cup
Third place	2018 Russia
- * Club domestic league appearances and goals as of 20:49, 22 November 2026 (UTC) ‡ National team caps and goals as of 21:57, 15 November 2026 (UTC)

Youri Marion A. Tielemans (Flemish pronunciation: [ˈjuːri ˈtiləmɑns]; born 7 May 1997) is a Belgian professional footballer who plays as a midfielder for Premier League club Manchester United and captains the Belgium national team.

Tielemans began his career at Anderlecht, where he made 184 appearances and scored 35 goals across four seasons. He won the league title twice and in 2017 was chosen as the Belgian Professional Footballer of the Year. He is the youngest Belgian to play in the UEFA Champions League, making his debut in the competition at the age of 16 years and 148 days. After two years at Monaco in Ligue 1, he joined Leicester City in 2019, initially on loan and then for an estimated fee of £33 million. He played 195 total games and scored 28 goals, including the only goal of the 2021 FA Cup final. In 2023, when his contract with Leicester expired and the club were relegated to the Championship, he joined Aston Villa, where he made 134 appearances over three seasons, and won the UEFA Europa League in the 2025–26 season. He joined Manchester United in July 2026.

Tielemans represented Belgium at several youth levels before gaining his first cap for the senior team in November 2016, aged 19. He was part of the squad that came third at the 2018 FIFA World Cup, also featuring at UEFA Euro 2020, the 2022 World Cup, Euro 2024 and the 2026 World Cup.

== Club career ==
=== Anderlecht ===
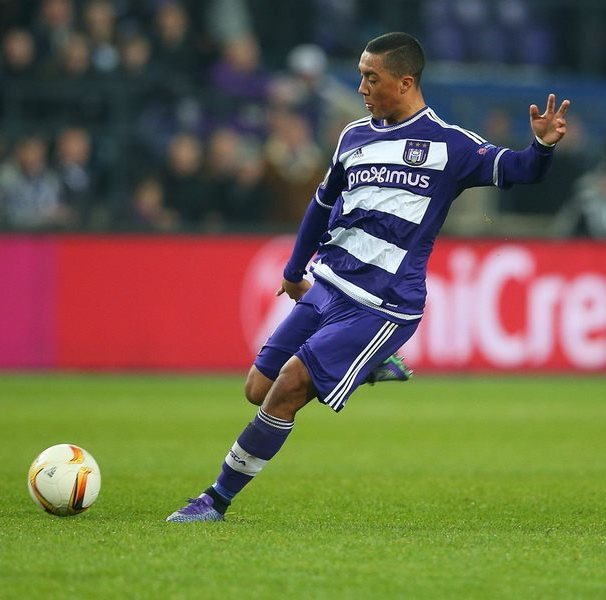
Tielemans playing for Anderlecht in 2016

Tielemans is a youth product of Anderlecht and signed his first professional contract with the club at the age of 16.

On 21 July 2013, he was included in the senior squad for the first time, remaining an unused substitute in the 1–0 win over Genk in the 2013 Belgian Super Cup. On 28 July 2013, he made his first-team debut in the opening round of the Belgian Pro League season against Lokeren, replacing injured Sacha Kljestan after 25 minutes of a 2–3 home loss. This made him the fourth-youngest player in the league's history.

On 2 October 2013, he became the youngest Belgian player to play in the UEFA Champions League, starting in a match against Olympiacos at the age of 16 years and 148 days. He played 29 games – of which 21 starts – as Anderlecht won the 2013–14 Belgian Pro League, scoring to open a 3–0 win over Club Brugge at the Constant Vanden Stock Stadium on 6 April 2014, a game in which he also assisted Cyriac. Tielemans won the Belgian Young Player of the Year award in each of his first two seasons.

Tielemans scored 13 times in 37 Belgian First Division A matches as Anderlecht won the 2016–17 Belgian First Division A. He won the 2017 Ebony Shoe Award for best player of African origin, and was named 2016–17 Belgian Professional Footballer of the Year. He scored five goals in 15 2016–17 UEFA Europa League matches, with his club reaching the quarter-finals, and was selected in its Squad of the Season.

=== Monaco ===
On 24 May 2017, Tielemans joined 2016–17 Ligue 1 champions Monaco on a five-year deal for a fee of around €25 million. He made his competitive debut on 29 July in the Trophée des Champions at the Grand Stade de Tanger, playing the full 90 minutes in the 2–1 loss to Paris Saint-Germain and assisting Djibril Sidibé's opening goal.

On 4 August 2017, Tielemans made his Ligue 1 debut in the 3–2 home win over Toulouse, coming on as a substitute for Radamel Falcao in the 87th minute. He made his UEFA club competition debut for Monaco on 13 September in the UEFA Champions League group match away to RB Leipzig, playing the full 90 minutes and registering his first competitive goal for Monaco by equalising in a 1–1 draw. On 16 September, Tielemans made his first Ligue 1 start and played the entire match in the 3–0 home win over Strasbourg, after having played a total of 56 minutes as a substitute in his first four Ligue 1 matches.

France Football named Tielemans in their lists of the biggest flops of the first half of the season and the season overall. He scored his first Ligue 1 goal in his 31st game on 2 September 2018, in a 3–2 home loss to Marseille.

=== Leicester City ===
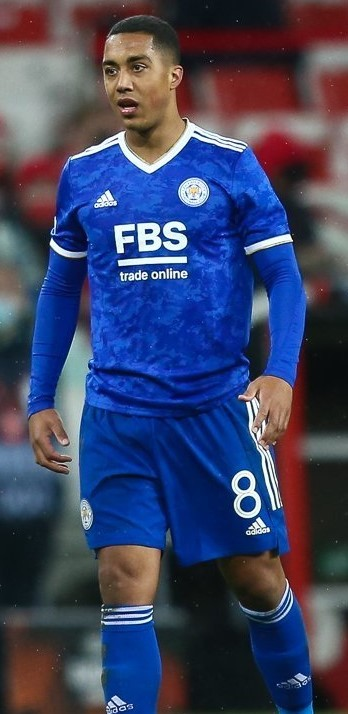
Tielemans playing for Leicester City in 2021

On 31 January 2019, Tielemans joined Premier League club Leicester City on loan until the end of the season, with Adrien Silva going the other way in a swap deal. On 9 March, Tielemans scored his first goal for the club in a 3–1 win over Fulham. Tielemans completed a permanent move to Leicester City on 8 July 2019, on a four-year deal for an estimated fee of £32 million. He scored in a 3–1 home win over Bournemouth on 31 August, but courted controversy with a high challenge on Callum Wilson that escaped punishment even after consultation with the video assistant referee; referees' chief Mike Riley ruled that this was an incorrect decision and Tielemans should have been sent off.

On 15 May 2021, Tielemans scored the only goal of the 2021 FA Cup Final with a long-range strike against Chelsea in the 63rd minute, sealing Leicester's first ever FA Cup title. He was named the man of the match and later won Leicester's Supporters' Player of the Year and the Players' Player of the Year awards.

In 2022, Tielemans was linked with a transfer to Arsenal, and there was speculation over whether he would sign a new contract. In June 2023, after Leicester's relegation from the Premier League, Tielemans announced he would be leaving the club.

=== Aston Villa ===
On 10 June 2023, Premier League club Aston Villa announced that they had reached an agreement to sign 26-year-old Tielemans on a free transfer, upon the expiry of his Leicester City contract on 1 July. He made his debut on 12 August in the season opener, a 5–1 loss at Newcastle United, in which he replaced the injured Leon Bailey at half time.

On 26 October 2023, Tielemans scored his first goal for Aston Villa in a 4–1 away UEFA Europa Conference League victory over AZ.

At the end-of-season awards for the 2024–25 campaign, Tielemans was voted both Supporters' and Players' Player of the Season for Aston Villa. On 20 May 2026, he opened the scoring in a 3–0 victory over SC Freiburg in the Europa League final, helping his club win their first title in the competition.

=== Manchester United ===
On 14 July 2026, fellow Premier League club Manchester United signed Tielemans to a five-year contract after activating his £35 million release clause.

== International career ==
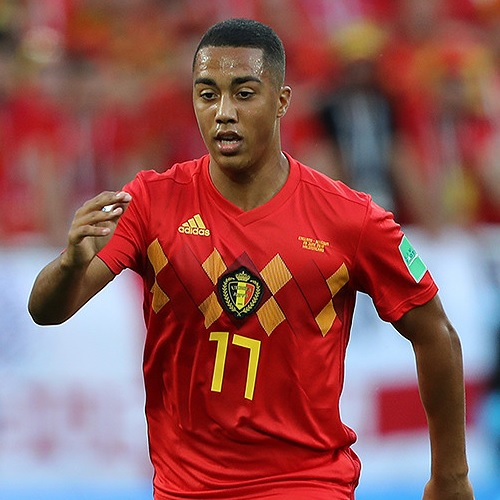
Tielemans with Belgium during the 2018 FIFA World Cup.

In June 2015, Tielemans was called up to the senior Belgium squad for a UEFA Euro 2016 qualifier against Wales. The 19-year-old finally made his senior international debut on 9 November 2016, in a 1–1 friendly away draw to rival Netherlands, replacing Steven Defour in the 82nd minute.

Tielemans was included in manager Roberto Martínez's 23-man squad for the 2018 FIFA World Cup in Russia. He played four matches in the tournament, including the 2–0 win over England in the third-place match.

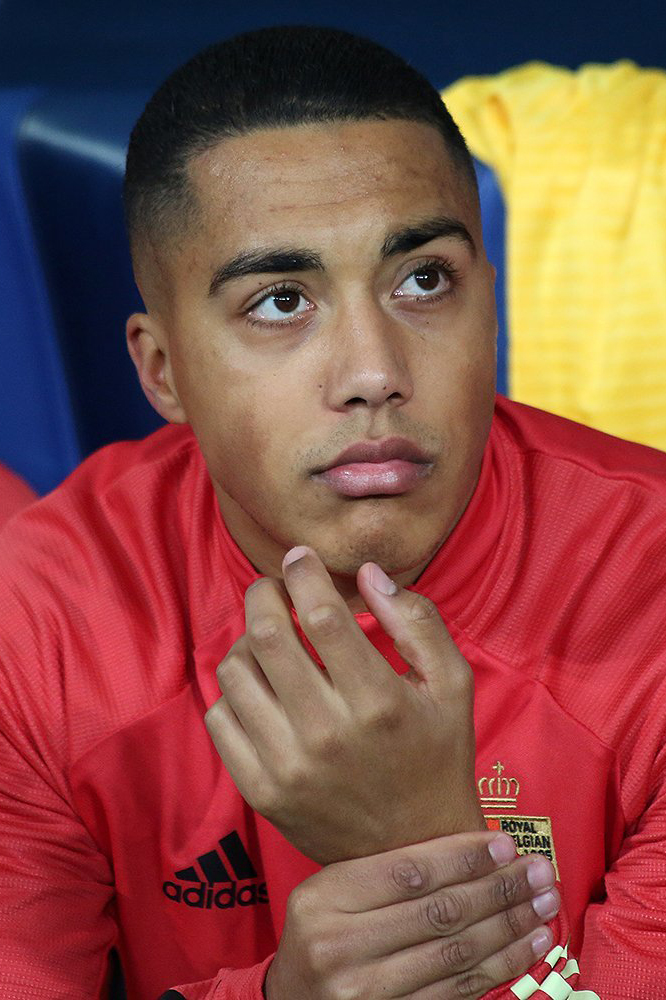
Tielemans with Belgium in 2019.

Tielemans scored his first senior goal for Belgium on 21 March 2019, in a UEFA Euro 2020 qualifying match against Russia. He was called up for the delayed final tournament in May 2021, and for the 2022 FIFA World Cup in Qatar. At the latter tournament, he was substituted at half time for Amadou Onana as the team struggled to a 1–0 win over Canada in their opening match. He was a substitute in the two other games of the group stage elimination, in which Onana and then Leander Dendoncker started alongside Axel Witsel.

Tielemans playing for Belgium at the 2026 FIFA World Cup

On 3 September 2025, Tielemans was appointed as the permanent captain of the Belgian national team by manager Rudi Garcia. On 15 May 2026, he was called up to Belgium's 26-man squad for the 2026 FIFA World Cup. At the latter tournament, he scored an 89th-minute equalizer against Senegal in the Round of 32 to complete Belgium's comeback from two goals down and force extra time. He then converted a penalty in the 125th minutes of extra time to secure a 3–2 victory and send Belgium into the Round of 16, while also earning the Man of the Match award. He became the second Belgian to score multiple goals in a World Cup knockout match; Bernard Voorhoof previously achieved the feat in 1934. He sustained a hamstring injury during the warm-up ahead of the quarterfinal against Spain and was replaced by Hans Vanaken. Belgium eventually lost the match 2–1.

== Player profile ==
Tielemans began as a holding midfielder, but was moved by Anderlecht manager Besnik Hasi to a more attacking role, where he scored long-range goals and was compared to Frank Lampard and Axel Witsel. A 2015 profile by Sky Sports noted his versatility as a defensive or attacking midfielder, concluding that his pace, passing and shot power suited the latter role better. Paul Van Himst, a former Anderlecht and Belgium player, noted at the same time that Tielemans had good skills with long passes.

Primarily a box-to-box midfielder at Leicester, Tielemans played frequently as a number 10 under Unai Emery at Aston Villa, frequently making progressive passes and recovering the ball for his team. During the 2024–25 season, Tielemans was highlighted as one of Aston Villa's best players and was praised for his footballing intelligence, accurate shooting, ball recoveries and passing, with his midfield performances being compared to that of his Belgian compatriot Kevin De Bruyne. He set a Premier League record in November 2024, completing 126 successful passes in Villa's 3–2 victory against Everton. In addition to his playmaking abilities, Tielemans has demonstrated proficiency in a deeper, defensive screening role. Regarded as an anchoring midfielder, he is noted for his press resistance and ability to dictate play from deep. During the 2025–26 season, a tactical analysis by The Athletic highlighted his exceptional passing range; he led all Premier League midfield or attacking players in defensive lines broken per 100 passes (18.3) and ranked first among defensive and central midfield players for passes breaking two lines. Defensively, rather than relying on pace or agility, Tielemans effectively utilizes his reading of the game to screen the defense and win tackles in transition, often acting as the catalyst for his team's attacking sequences.

Tielemans has been widely praised for his professionalism and leadership qualities, particularly his ability to lead by example. During his breakthrough at Anderlecht, he was regarded as a future club captain due to his maturity and leadership skills despite his young age. In August 2025, Belgium head coach Rudi Garcia appointed him as the permanent captain of the national team, stating that Tielemans enjoys the respect of both senior and younger players and serves as a unifying figure within the squad.

== Personal life ==
Tielemans was born in Sint-Pieters-Leeuw, Flemish Brabant. His father is of Flemish descent and his mother is of Congolese descent. He continued pursuing his education until the age of 18, splitting time between his studies and his professional career. Tielemans and his wife, Mendy, have three daughters. During the course of his footballing career, he has lived in Anderlecht, Brussels-Capital Region, Monte Carlo, Monaco, Quorn, Leicestershire, England, Aston, Birmingham, England, and currently resides in the Greater Manchester area.

== Career statistics ==
=== Club ===
As of match played 22 November 2026

Appearances and goals by club, season and competition
Club	Season	League			National cup (Note: Includes Belgian Cup, Coupe de France, FA Cup)		League cup (Note: Includes Coupe de la Ligue, EFL Cup)		Europe		Other		Total	
Club	Season	Division	Apps	Goals	Apps	Goals	Apps	Goals	Apps	Goals	Apps	Goals	Apps	Goals
Anderlecht	2013–14	Belgian Pro League	29	1	1	1	—		4 (Note: Appearances in UEFA Champions League)	0	0	0	34	2
Anderlecht	2014–15	Belgian Pro League	39	6	4	2	—		8 (Note: Six appearances in UEFA Champions League, two appearances in UEFA Europa League)	0	1 (Note: Appearance in Belgian Super Cup)	0	52	8
Anderlecht	2015–16	Belgian Pro League	34	6	2	1	—		9 (Note: Appearances in UEFA Europa League)	0	—		45	7
Anderlecht	2016–17	Belgian Pro League	37	13	1	0	—		15 (Note: Two appearances and one goal in UEFA Champions League, thirteen appearances and four goals in UEFA Europa League)	5	—		53	18
Anderlecht	Total		139	26	8	4	—		36	5	1	0	184	35
Monaco	2017–18	Ligue 1	27	0	1	0	2	0	4	1	1 (Note: Appearance in Trophée des Champions)	0	35	1
Monaco	2018–19	Ligue 1	20	5	1	0	2	0	6	0	1	0	30	5
Monaco	Total		47	5	2	0	4	0	10	1	2	0	65	6
Leicester City (loan)	2018–19	Premier League	13	3	—		—		—		—		13	3
Leicester City	2019–20	Premier League	37	3	2	0	5	2	—		—		44	5
Leicester City	2020–21	Premier League	38	6	6	3	0	0	7	0	—		51	9
Leicester City	2021–22	Premier League	32	6	2	1	2	0	13 (Note: Five appearances in UEFA Europa League, eight appearances in UEFA Europa Conference League)	0	1 (Note: Appearance in FA Community Shield)	0	50	7
Leicester City	2022–23	Premier League	31	3	2	0	4	1	—		—		37	4
Leicester City	Leicester total		151	21	12	4	11	3	20	0	1	0	195	28
Aston Villa	2023–24	Premier League	32	2	2	0	1	0	11 (Note: Appearances in UEFA Europa Conference League)	1	—		46	3
Aston Villa	2024–25	Premier League	36	3	5	0	0	0	12	2	—		53	5
Aston Villa	2025–26	Premier League	25	0	1	0	0	0	9	2	—		35	2
Aston Villa	Total		93	5	8	0	1	0	32	5	—		134	10
Manchester United	2026–27	Premier League	10	1	0	0	1	0	4	0	—		15	1
Career total			440	58	30	8	17	3	102	11	4	0	593	80

=== International ===
As of match played 15 November 2026

Appearances and goals by national team and year
National team	Year	Apps	Goals
Belgium	2016	2	0
Belgium	2017	6	0
Belgium	2018	11	0
Belgium	2019	9	2
Belgium	2020	6	2
Belgium	2021	13	0
Belgium	2022	11	1
Belgium	2023	7	0
Belgium	2024	9	4
Belgium	2025	7	3
Belgium	2026	14	3
Total		95	15

As of match played 15 November 2026
Scores and results list Belgium's goal tally first.

List of international goals scored by Youri Tielemans
No.	Date	Venue	Opponent	Score	Result	Competition
1	21 March 2019	King Baudouin Stadium, Brussels, Belgium	Russia	1–0	3–1	UEFA Euro 2020 qualifying
2	10 October 2019	King Baudouin Stadium, Brussels, Belgium	San Marino	6–0	9–0	UEFA Euro 2020 qualifying
3	15 November 2020	Den Dreef, Leuven, Belgium	England	1–0	2–0	2020–21 UEFA Nations League A
4	18 November 2020	Den Dreef, Leuven, Belgium	Denmark	1–0	4–2	2020–21 UEFA Nations League A
5	11 June 2022	Cardiff City Stadium, Cardiff, Wales	Wales	1–0	1–1	2022–23 UEFA Nations League A
6	26 March 2024	Wembley Stadium, London, England	England	1–0	2–2	Friendly
7	26 March 2024	Wembley Stadium, London, England	England	2–1	2–2	Friendly
8	22 June 2024	RheinEnergieStadion, Cologne, Germany	Romania	1–0	2–0	UEFA Euro 2024
9	6 September 2024	Nagyerdei Stadion, Debrecen, Hungary	Israel	2–1	3–1	2024–25 UEFA Nations League A
10	9 June 2025	King Baudouin Stadium, Brussels, Belgium	Wales	2–0	4–3	2026 FIFA World Cup qualification
11	4 September 2025	Rheinpark Stadion, Vaduz, Liechtenstein	Liechtenstein	2–0	6–0	2026 FIFA World Cup qualification
12	4 September 2025	Rheinpark Stadion, Vaduz, Liechtenstein	Liechtenstein	5–0	6–0	2026 FIFA World Cup qualification
13	2 June 2026	Stadion Rujevica, Rijeka, Croatia	Croatia	1–0	2–0	Friendly
14	1 July 2026	Lumen Field, Seattle, United States	Senegal	2–2	3–2 (a.e.t.)	2026 FIFA World Cup
15	1 July 2026	Lumen Field, Seattle, United States	Senegal	3–2	3–2 (a.e.t.)	2026 FIFA World Cup

== Honours ==
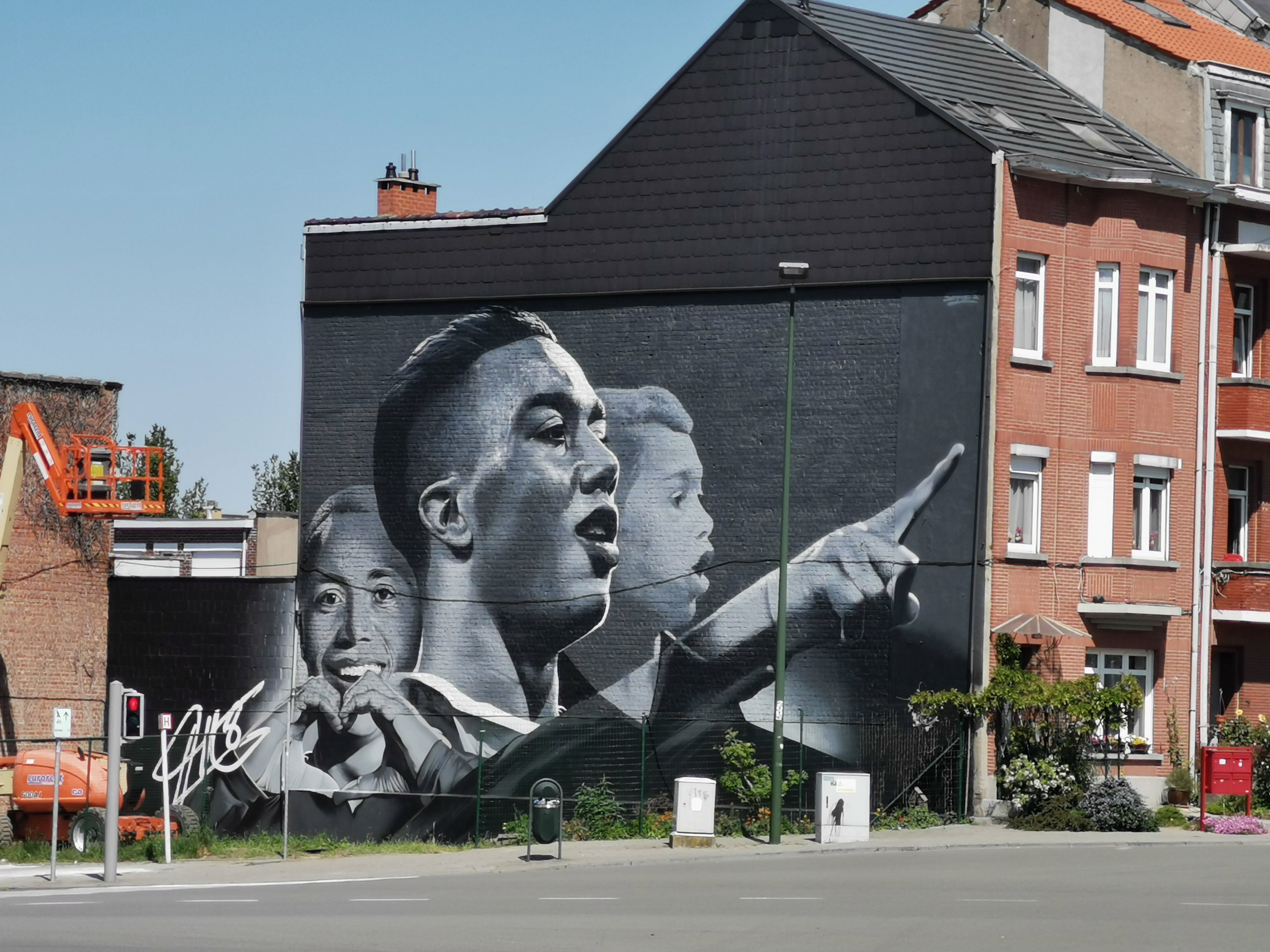
Mural of Tielemans in Anderlecht

Anderlecht

- Belgian Pro League/First Division A: 2013–14, 2016–17
- Belgian Super Cup: 2013, 2014

Leicester City

- FA Cup: 2020–21
- FA Community Shield: 2021

Aston Villa

- UEFA Europa League: 2025–26

Belgium

- FIFA World Cup third place: 2018

Individual

- Belgian Young Professional Footballer of the Year: 2013–14, 2014–15
- Belgian Talent of the Year: 2014
- Best Youngster of the Belgian Pro League: 2014, 2015
- Goal.com NxGn: 2016
- Belgian Professional Footballer of the Year: 2016–17
- Belgian Pro League top assist provider: 2016–17
- UEFA Europa League Squad of the Season: 2016–17
- Ebony Shoe: 2017
- Belgian Silver Shoe: 2017
- Leicester City Player of the Season: 2020–21
- Leicester City Players' Player of the Season: 2020–21
- Aston Villa Player of the Season: 2024–25
- Aston Villa Players' Player of the Season: 2024–25
