= Cheikhou Kouyaté =

Senegalese footballer (born 1989)

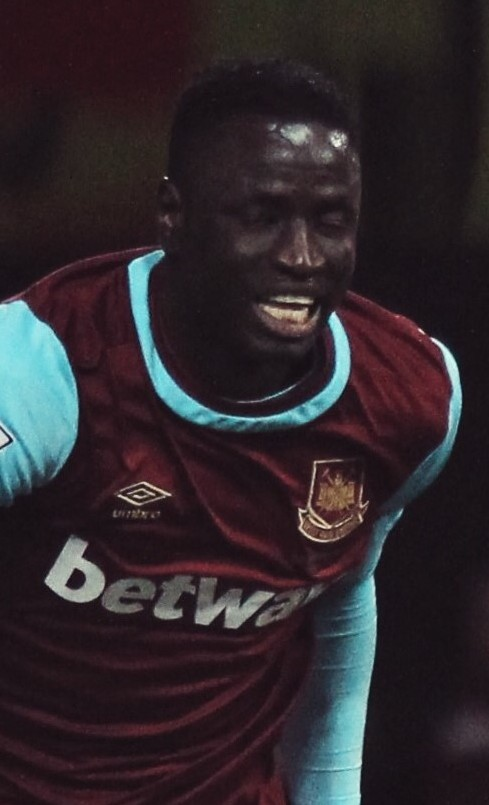
- Kouyaté playing for West Ham United in 2016

Personal information
- Full name: Cheikhou Kouyaté
- Date of birth: 21 December 1989 (age 36)
- Place of birth: Dakar, Senegal
- Height: 1.92 m (6 ft 4 in)
- Positions: Defensive midfielder; centre-back

Youth career
- 1996–2006: ASC Yego Dakar
- 2006–2007: RWDM Brussels

Senior career*
Years	Team	Apps	(Gls)
2007–2008	RWDM Brussels	10	(0)
2008–2014	Anderlecht	153	(4)
2008–2009	→ Kortrijk (loan)	26	(3)
2014–2018	West Ham United	129	(12)
2018–2022	Crystal Palace	129	(2)
2022–2024	Nottingham Forest	33	(1)
2025–2026	Amedspor	8	(0)

International career
2007	Senegal U20	3	(2)
2012	Senegal Olympic	4	(0)
2012–2024	Senegal	92	(4)
Medal record
Men's football
Representing Senegal
Africa Cup of Nations
Winner	2021 Cameroon
Runner-up	2019 Egypt
- * Club domestic league appearances and goals

Cheikhou Kouyaté (born 21 December 1989) is a Senegalese former professional footballer who played as a defensive midfielder or centre-back.

Kouyaté moved from Senegal to Belgium in 2006, having been offered a youth contract at RWDM Brussels. He played ten games before moving to Anderlecht aged 19, where he made 206 appearances and won the Belgian First Division A four times. In June 2014, he joined West Ham United of the Premier League. In 2018, he transferred to Crystal Palace for an estimated £9.5 million, and played for the latter across four seasons until signing for Nottingham Forest in 2022.

A full international from 2012 to 2024, Kouyaté debuted for the Senegal national team at the age of 22 and represented the national team at that year's Olympics. He played at two FIFA World Cups (the 2018 and 2022 editions specifically) and four Africa Cup of Nations tournaments, including Senegal's victory in 2021.

== Club career ==
=== Early career ===
Kouyaté began his footballing career in 1996 in his hometown with ASC Yego Dakar and was scouted by RWDM Brussels in September 2006. RWDM Brussels then signed the player in January the following year. He went on to play ten league appearances for the first team between 2007 and 2008.

=== Anderlecht ===
As Kouyaté turned 19, he left Brussels because his former employers did not pay his wages for three months. He subsequently moved to Anderlecht on a free transfer and signed a four-year deal. He also had a loan at KV Kortrijk. Kouyaté made 153 league appearances for Anderlecht, scoring four goals in five seasons at the club. He won the 2009–10, 2011–12, 2012–13 and 2013–14 league titles as well as the 2010–11, 2012–13 and 2013–14 Belgian Super Cups.

=== West Ham United ===
==== 2014–15 season ====
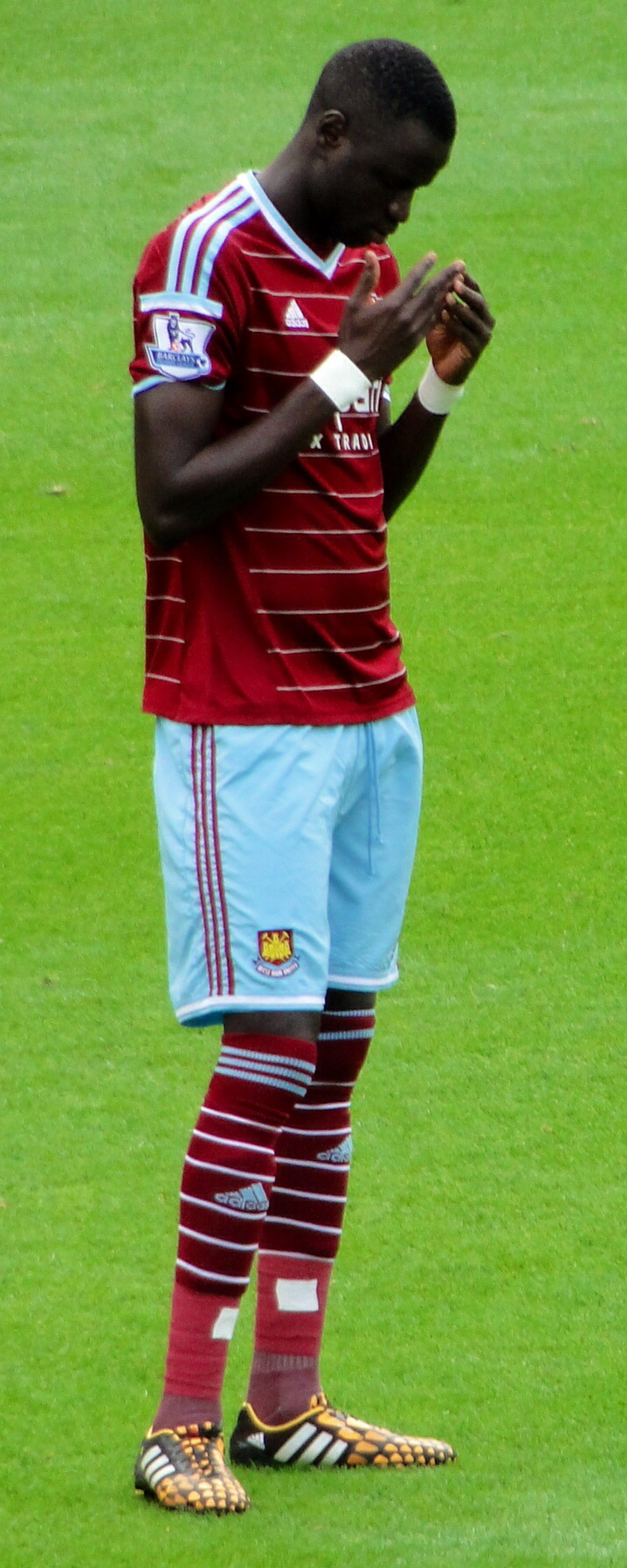
Kouyaté praying before a West Ham match, August 2014

On 18 June 2014, Kouyaté signed for West Ham United on a four-year contract for a fee of £7 million. He made his West Ham debut on 16 August in a 1–0 home defeat to Tottenham Hotspur, for which his performance was described as "impressive" by the BBC. The following week, manager Sam Allardyce compared him to ex-Arsenal captain Patrick Vieira. On 28 December, Kouyaté scored his first West Ham goal in a 2–1 defeat to Arsenal. His second goal of the season came on 8 February 2015 in a 1–1 draw with Manchester United. His performance in the game won praise from manager Allardyce for Kouyaté's Man of the Match performance which was also singled out as the Individual Performance of the Season, by a West Ham player, at the clubs' annual awards. He scored two further goals in the season, in a 2–2 away draw with Tottenham and in a 2–1 away defeat to Leicester City. Kouyaté finished the season having played 31 out of a possible 38 Premier League games.

==== 2015–16 season ====
On 9 August 2015, Kouyaté scored the opening goal in the 43rd minute in a 2–0 win over Arsenal at the Emirates Stadium. He then scored in a 4–3 home defeat to Bournemouth on 22 August. He scored his third goal of the season in a 2–2 draw with Norwich City on 26 September, netting the equalizer in the 90th minute to rescue a point for West Ham. In March 2016, Kouyate signed a new, five-year contract with West Ham that could keep him at the club until 2021. Kouyaté was sent-off twice during the 2015–16 season and on both occasions had the card rescinded by The Football Association (FA). On 21 February, he was dismissed by referee Jonathan Moss in a 5–1 FA Cup win at Blackburn Rovers, only for the card to be rescinded a few days later. On 2 April, he was dismissed in a Premier League game at the Boleyn Ground against Crystal Palace by referee Mark Clattenburg. This too, however, was overturned a few days later.

==== 2016–17 season ====
On 4 August 2016, Kouyaté scored West Ham's first ever goal at the Olympic Stadium, coming in the eighth minute of a Europa League game against NK Domžale. He also scored the second in the game, which West Ham won 3–0. On 26 October 2016, Kouyaté scored the opening goal in a 2–1 EFL Cup victory against rivals Chelsea. On 8 April 2017, Kouyaté scored a "stunning low 25-yard strike", as West Ham beat relegation rivals Swansea City.

==== 2017–18 season ====
On 23 September 2017, Kouyaté scored his first goal of the season in a 3–2 loss against Tottenham. Kouyaté's final goal for the club came on 24 November 2017, scoring the equaliser in a 1–1 draw with Leicester City. Kouyaté marked the headed goal with a lowered crossed-armed celebration, designed to help raise awareness about the ongoing slavery in Libya.

=== Crystal Palace ===
On 1 August 2018, Kouyaté completed a move to fellow London club Crystal Palace on a four-year deal for an undisclosed fee, believed to be £9.5 million. He made his debut ten days later in a 2–0 win at Fulham, as an 88th-minute substitute for Andros Townsend. He scored his first goal in his 54th game on 26 December 2019, equalising in a 2–1 win over his previous club at Selhurst Park.

After the arrival of Patrick Vieira as manager in 2021, Kouyaté continued to play in midfield or an expanded defence in a 5–3–2 formation (as against part of a back-four in 2020–21) while his former midfield partners Luka Milivojević and James McArthur waned in importance. Kouyaté played in Palace's run to the semi-finals of the 2021–22 FA Cup, scoring in a 2–1 home win over Stoke City in the fifth round on 1 March. In May 2022, Kouyaté called his Senegalese teammate Idrissa Gueye a "real man" for reportedly refusing to wear a Paris Saint-Germain shirt with a rainbow-coloured number for LGBT rights. Vieira said that he would have a private discussion with Kouyaté.

=== Nottingham Forest ===
On 13 August 2022, Kouyaté signed a two-year contract with Premier League club Nottingham Forest. He made his debut for Forest in a 1–1 draw with Everton on 21 August and scored his first goal in a 3–2 loss to Bournemouth on 4 September. On 5 June 2024, the club announced that Kouyaté would depart the club in the summer when his contract expired.

== International career ==
Kouyaté was called up aged 18 to the Senegal under-20s in the same year as his RWDM Brussels debut. He scored two goals in just three games for the side in 2007.

On 29 February 2012, Kouyaté made his debut for the Senegal senior team as a 56th-minute substitute for Mohamed Diamé in a goalless friendly draw away to South Africa. At the time, he had been in the process of naturalisation as a Belgian citizen, and had been linked to the European country's national team. In the same year, he was announced to be in the squad for Senegal Olympic football team. He played in every game as Senegal's debut appearance in the tournament, which ended in a knockout in the quarter-final.

In January 2015, he was a member of the squad for the 2015 Africa Cup of Nations, held in Equatorial Guinea. He scored his first international goal on 5 September in 2017 Africa Cup of Nations qualification, in a 2–0 win away to Namibia.

He was part of the 23-man squad for the 2018 FIFA World Cup in Russia, and played all seven games as Senegal finished runners-up in the 2019 Africa Cup of Nations in Egypt. At the 2021 Africa Cup of Nations, he played six matches for the winners, having been suspended for the last 16 against Cape Verde. Returning for the quarter-finals against Equatorial Guinea, he restored their lead in a 3–1 win having been on for two minutes as a substitute.

Kouyaté was a member of Senegal's squad for the 2022 FIFA World Cup in Qatar. He started the opening match against the Netherlands, where he sustained a hamstring injury that led to him playing no further part at the tournament.

In December 2023, he was named in Senegal's squad for the postponed 2023 Africa Cup of Nations held in the Ivory Coast.

== Personal life ==
Kouyaté is married to Zahra Mbow. They have a son born in 2021. According to various Senegalese media outlets, Kouyaté has a second wife. Kouyaté is a practising Muslim and made the Hajj pilgrimage to Mecca.

He was appointed a Grand Officer of the National Order of the Lion by President of Senegal Macky Sall following the nation's victory at the 2021 Africa Cup of Nations.

== Career statistics ==
=== Club ===
As of match played 19 May 2024

Appearances and goals by club, season and competition
Club	Season	League			National cup		League cup		Other		Total	
Club	Season	Division	Apps	Goals	Apps	Goals	Apps	Goals	Apps	Goals	Apps	Goals
RWDM Brussels	2007–08	Belgian First Division	10	0	0	0	—		—		10	0
K.V. Kortrijk (loan)	2008–09	Belgian Pro League	26	3	0	0	—		—		26	3
Anderlecht	2009–10	Belgian Pro League	21	1	3	1	—		9	0	33	2
Anderlecht	2010–11	Belgian Pro League	23	1	2	0	—		8	0	33	1
Anderlecht	2011–12	Belgian Pro League	38	0	0	0	—		10	0	48	0
Anderlecht	2012–13	Belgian Pro League	33	1	4	0	—		8	0	45	1
Anderlecht	2013–14	Belgian Pro League	38	1	2	0	—		7	0	47	1
Anderlecht	Total		153	4	11	1	—		42	0	206	5
West Ham United	2014–15	Premier League	31	4	1	0	0	0	—		32	4
West Ham United	2015–16	Premier League	34	5	5	0	1	0	2 (Note: Appearances in UEFA Europa League)	0	42	5
West Ham United	2016–17	Premier League	31	1	0	0	2	1	3	2	36	4
West Ham United	2017–18	Premier League	33	2	1	0	3	0	—		37	2
West Ham United	Total		129	12	7	0	6	1	5	2	147	15
Crystal Palace	2018–19	Premier League	31	0	4	0	2	0	—		37	0
Crystal Palace	2019–20	Premier League	35	1	1	0	0	0	—		36	1
Crystal Palace	2020–21	Premier League	36	1	1	0	0	0	—		37	1
Crystal Palace	2021–22	Premier League	27	0	3	1	1	0	—		31	1
Crystal Palace	Total		129	2	9	1	3	0	—		141	3
Nottingham Forest	2022–23	Premier League	21	1	0	0	1	0	—		22	1
Nottingham Forest	2023–24	Premier League	12	0	1	0	1	0	—		14	0
Nottingham Forest	Total		33	1	1	0	2	0	—		36	1
Career total			480	22	28	2	11	1	47	2	566	27

=== International ===
As of match played 26 March 2024

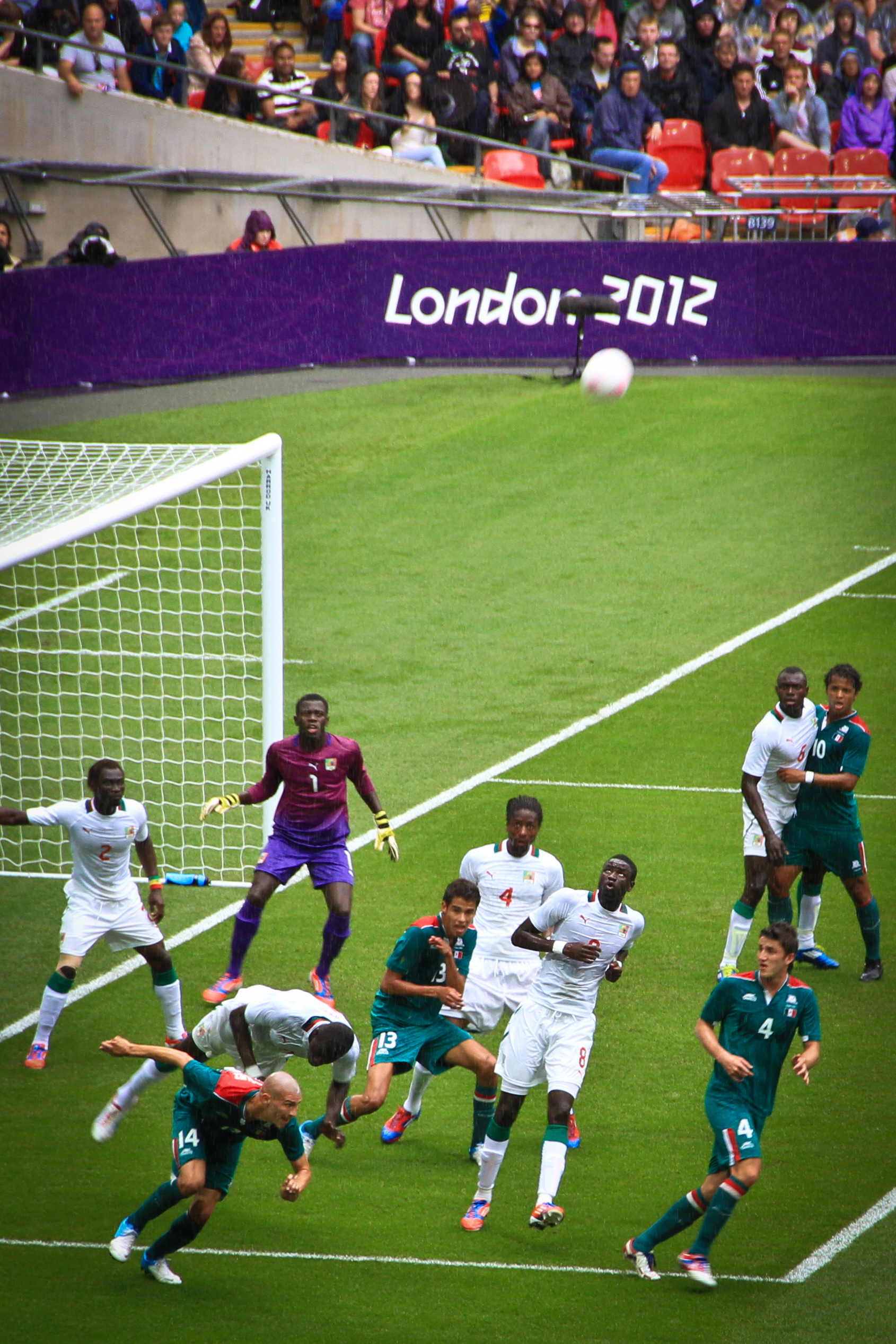
Kouyaté (white shirt, number 8) playing for Senegal against Mexico at the 2012 Olympics

Appearances and goals by national team and year
National team	Year	Apps	Goals
Senegal	2012	6	0
Senegal	2013	4	0
Senegal	2014	6	0
Senegal	2015	10	2
Senegal	2016	6	0
Senegal	2017	10	0
Senegal	2018	9	0
Senegal	2019	11	0
Senegal	2020	3	0
Senegal	2021	8	1
Senegal	2022	11	1
Senegal	2023	5	0
Senegal	2024	3	0
Total		92	4

Scores and results list Senegal's goal tally first.

List of international goals scored by Cheikhou Kouyaté
No.	Date	Venue	Opponent	Score	Result	Competition
1.	5 September 2015	Sam Nujoma Stadium, Windhoek, Namibia	Namibia	1–0	2–0	2017 Africa Cup of Nations qualification
2.	15 November 2015	Stade Léopold Sédar Senghor, Dakar, Senegal	Madagascar	1–0	3–0	2018 FIFA World Cup qualification
3.	30 March 2021	Stade Lat-Dior, Thiès, Senegal	Eswatini	1–1	1–1	2021 Africa Cup of Nations qualification
4.	30 January 2022	Ahmadou Ahidjo Stadium, Yaoundé, Cameroon	Equatorial Guinea	2–1	3–1	2021 Africa Cup of Nations

== Honours ==
Anderlecht

- Belgian Pro League: 2009–10, 2011–12, 2012–13, 2013–14
- Belgian Super Cup: 2010, 2012, 2013

Senegal

- African Cup of Nations: 2021; runner-up: 2019

Individual

- Grand Officer of the National Order of the Lion: 2022
