= 2013 Belgian Super Cup =

Anderlecht	Genk
1	0
- Date: 21 July 2013
- Venue: Constant Vanden Stock Stadium, Anderlecht
- Referee: Joeri Van de Velde

The 2013 Belgian Super Cup was a football match played on 21 July 2013, between 2012–13 Belgian Pro League winners Anderlecht and 2012–13 Belgian Cup winners Genk.

== Match details ==
21 July 2013
16:00 CEST

Anderlecht	1–0	Genk
Bruno 45+3'	Report

Constant Vanden Stock Stadium, Anderlecht
Referee: Joeri Van de Velde

Anderlecht	Genk

RSC ANDERLECHT:
GK	1	(Belgium) Silvio Proto
DF	3	(Belgium) Olivier Deschacht
MF	6	(Netherlands) Demy de Zeeuw
MF	9	(Argentina) Matías Suárez	(substituted off) 88'
MF	10	(Belgium) Dennis Praet	(substituted off) 83'
DF	14	(Netherlands) Bram Nuytinck
FW	15	(Ivory Coast) Cyriac	(substituted off) 90+2'
DF	16	(Senegal) Cheikhou Kouyaté
MF	17	(Belgium) Massimo Bruno
DF	19	(United States) Sacha Kljestan
MF	30	(Belgium) Guillaume Gillet (c)
Substitutes:
FW	7	(Sweden) Samuel Armenteros	(substituted on) 90+2'
GK	13	(Belgium) Thomas Kaminski
MF	18	(Ghana) Frank Acheampong
DF	22	(Democratic Republic of the Congo) Chancel Mbemba
MF	31	(Belgium) Youri Tielemans
MF	32	(Belgium) Leander Dendoncker	(substituted on) 83'
DF	37	(Belgium) Jordan Lukaku	(substituted on) 88'
Manager:
(Netherlands) John van den Brom

GENK:
GK	26	(Hungary) László Köteles
DF	2	(Senegal) Kara Mbodji
DF	3	(Belgium) Derrick Tshimanga
DF	5	(France) Kalidou Koulibaly
MF	7	(Trinidad and Tobago) Khaleem Hyland		(substituted off) 76'
FW	9	(Belgium) Jelle Vossen (c)
MF	10	(France) Julien Gorius
MF	16	(South Africa) Anele Ngcongca		(substituted off) 86'
MF	19	(Belgium) Thomas Buffel
FW	23	(Belgium) Benjamin De Ceulaer	(yellow card) 90'
MF	35	(Belgium) Anthony Limbombe		(substituted off) 66'
Substitutes:
FW	6	(Nigeria) Kim Ojo		(substituted on) 66'
DF	11	(Denmark) Brian Hamalainen
DF	17	(Belgium) Jeroen Simaeys
GK	22	(Belgium) Kristof Van Hout
MF	37	(Belgium) Jordy Croux		(substituted on) 86'
MF	39	(Belgium) Pieter Gerkens
MF	45	(Ghana) Bennard Kumordzi		(substituted on) 76'
Manager:
(Netherlands) Mario Been

== See also ==
- 2013–14 Belgian Pro League
- 2013–14 Belgian Cup
