= Dennis Praet =

Belgian footballer (born 1994)

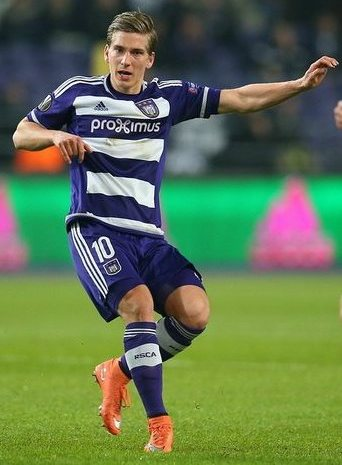
- Praet playing for Anderlecht in 2016

Personal information
- Full name: Dennis Praet
- Date of birth: 14 May 1994 (age 32)
- Place of birth: Leuven, Belgium
- Height: 1.81 m (5 ft 11 in)
- Position: Midfielder

Team information
- Current team: Mechelen
- Number: 26

Youth career
- 1999–2000: SJV Motbroek
- 2000–2002: Stade Leuven
- 2002–2003: OH Leuven
- 2003–2010: Genk
- 2010–2011: Anderlecht

Senior career*
Years	Team	Apps	(Gls)
2011–2016	Anderlecht	139	(20)
2016–2019	Sampdoria	98	(4)
2019–2024	Leicester City	81	(3)
2021–2022	→ Torino (loan)	23	(2)
2024–2026	Antwerp	57	(0)
2026–	Mechelen	2	(0)

International career
2009	Belgium U15	3	(0)
2009–2010	Belgium U16	10	(1)
2010–2011	Belgium U17	11	(2)
2011	Belgium U18	2	(0)
2012	Belgium U19	7	(2)
2012–2016	Belgium U21	17	(2)
2014–2023	Belgium	15	(2)
- * Club domestic league appearances and goals as of 16 August 2026

Dennis Praet (born 14 May 1994) is a Belgian professional footballer who plays as a midfielder for Belgian Pro League club Mechelen.

== Early life ==
Praet was born in Leuven, Flemish Brabant.

== Club career ==
=== Youth at Genk ===
Praet joined the Genk youth academy in 2003 at the age of eight. He went on to spend most of his youth career at Genk, where he quickly made an impression and played for the club's youth teams until 2010. He was part of a strong generation at the club and scouts considered him one of the top talents. He became part of Belgium's youth teams and attracted the interest of clubs like Arsenal, Barcelona, Ajax and Lille.

=== Anderlecht ===
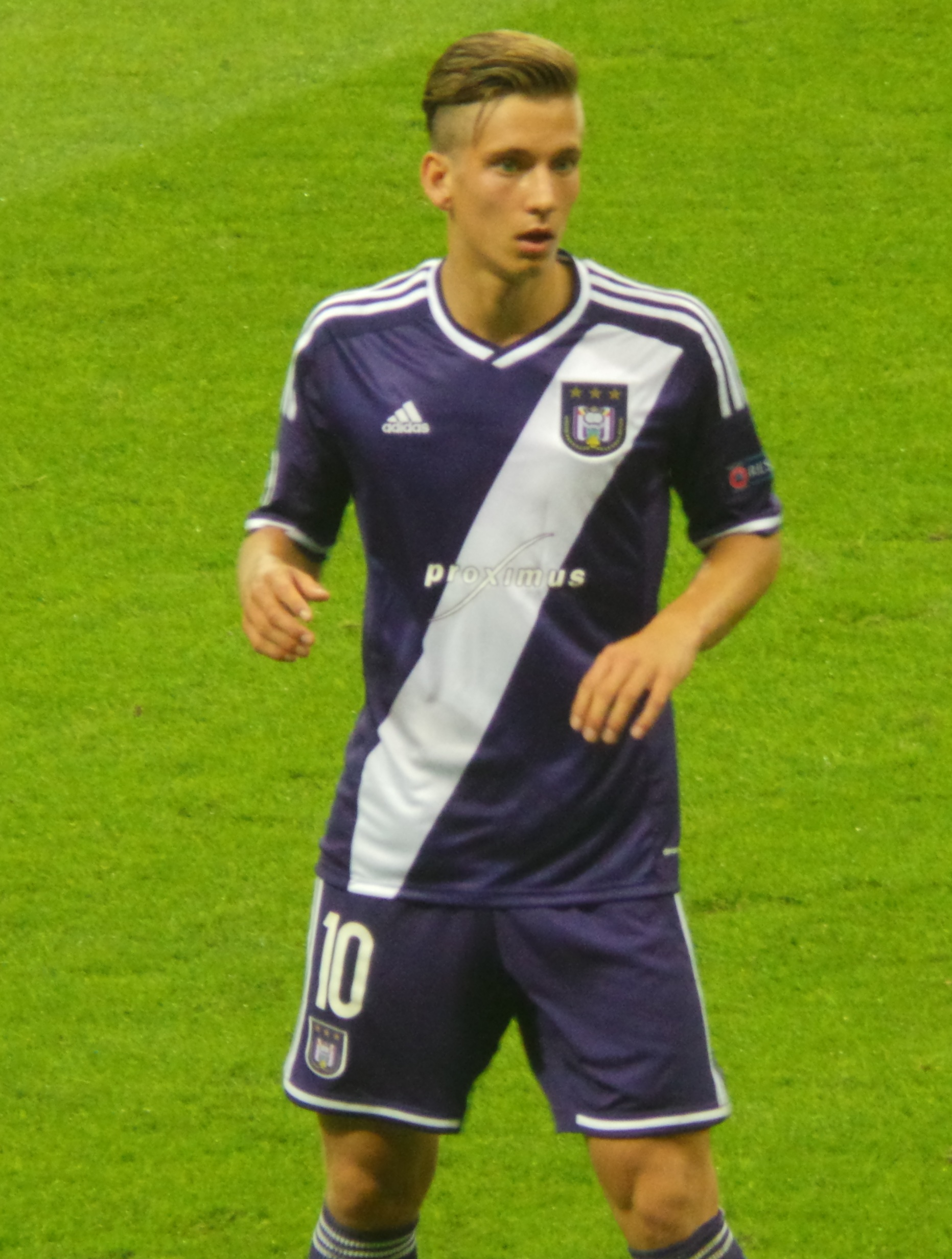
Praet playing for Anderlecht in 2014

In May 2010 Praet transferred from Genk to Anderlecht turning down more lucrative offers. At Anderlecht he started out with the under-19 team, continuing to impress. In 2011, he received the prize for best player during the AEGON Future Cup in Amsterdam, a youth tournament in which teams like Ajax and Bayern Munich also competed.

Praet debuted in Anderlecht's first team on 21 September 2011 starting in the Belgian Cup against Lommel United and provided two assists in a 4–0 win. In the next round of the cup, he scored his first official goal for Anderlecht, against Rupel Boom. Not long after, on 30 October, he also made his debut in the Belgian Pro League as a substitute for Fernando Canesin while playing against Lierse. In March 2012, Praet signed a new contract until 2015.

During the 2012–13 season, Praet played regularly for Anderlecht as the club won their second straight league title. A two-year contract extension was agreed in early 2014 to take him through to the summer of 2017. He scored the third goal in Anderlecht's 3–1 Jupiler Pro League play-off win over Lokeren on 25 May 2014 to seal Anderlecht's 33rd league title, and their third in a row.

Praet made his 100th competitive appearance for the club in the league match at Club Brugge on 31 August 2014. On 16 September, he scored away to Galatasaray in the UEFA Champions League group stage to put Anderlecht in front, but the Turkish club equalised in added time. His first league goal of the 2014–15 season came in the 2–2 draw at home to Club Brugge when he scored Anderlecht's opening goal to equalise midway through the first-half. Like his strike against Galatasaray in the Champions League, it went in off the post. He scored in four consecutive games for Anderlecht between 14 and 26 December 2014, with the league wins over Oostende, Waasland Beveren and Westerlo and the Belgian Cup win against Zulte Waregem.

This rich of form at the end of the year was rewarded at a ceremony on 14 January 2015 where Praet won the 2014 Belgian Golden Shoe, the annual award given to the best player in the Jupiler Pro League for the previous calendar year. He polled five points (250) ahead of Víctor Vázquez of Club Brugge (245).

=== Sampdoria ===
On 24 August 2016, Praet's move to Sampdoria was finalised. Sampdoria paid a transfer fee of €10 million. After being heavily linked with a move to reigning Serie A champions Juventus during the 2018 summer transfer window, in November 2018, Praet signed a contract extension with Sampdoria, extending his stay at the club until 2021.

Praet was an ever present in the Sampdoria side during his three-year spell, appearing in 98 Serie A games and scoring four goals, as the club finished in the top half of the table all three seasons.

=== Leicester City ===
On 8 August 2019, Praet signed for Premier League club Leicester City on a five-year contract, for a reported fee of €20 million. On 18 August 2019, he made his league debut as a 73rd-minute substitute in a 1–1 draw against Chelsea. On 11 January 2020, Praet scored his first goal for Leicester City in 1–2 defeat against Southampton. On 20 September 2020, he scored his second goal in a 4–2 win over Burnley.

==== Torino (loan) ====
On 31 August 2021, Praet joined Torino on a season-long loan.

==== Return to Leicester ====
Praet returned to Leicester for the 2022–23 season, scoring his only goal of the Premier League campaign in a 4–2 away win over Aston Villa on 4 February 2023. However, the club were relegation after ending up in the 18th position on the league table.

In the 2023–24 season, he achieved the EFL Championship with the club, securing promotion back to the Premier League. On 7 June 2024, he was among the players announced to depart the club upon the conclusion of the season.

=== Antwerp ===
On 6 September 2024, Praet signed a contract with Antwerp for two seasons with an option for a third.

=== Mechelen ===
On 16 July 2026, Praet signed a two-year contract with Mechelen.

== International career ==
Praet has represented Belgium at every age group under-15 and older making an appearance in the U21 team a mere three years after first playing for the U15 team.

On 6 November 2014, Praet received his first call up to the senior Belgian squad for the friendly at home to Iceland on 12 November, and the Euro 2016 Qualifier against Wales on 16 November. He made his senior international début coming on as a 76th-minute substitute for Christian Benteke after all four goals had been scored in the 3–1 friendly win over Iceland in Brussels.

Praet earned his second cap for Belgium almost four years on from his debut featuring in a 1–1 draw against rivals Netherlands in October 2018. On 17 May 2021, he was named in the Belgian squad for the UEFA Euro 2020.

== Career statistics ==
=== Club ===
As of match played 23 April 2024

Appearances and goals by club, season and competition
Club	Season	League			National cup (Note: Includes Belgian Cup, Coppa Italia, FA Cup)		League cup (Note: Includes EFL Cup)		Europe		Other		Total	
Club	Season	Division	Apps	Goals	Apps	Goals	Apps	Goals	Apps	Goals	Apps	Goals	Apps	Goals
Anderlecht	2011–12	Belgian Pro League	7	0	2	1	—		—		—		9	1
Anderlecht	2012–13	Belgian Pro League	27	2	6	2	—		6 (Note: Appearances in UEFA Champions League)	1	1 (Note: Appearance in Belgian Super Cup)	1	40	6
Anderlecht	2013–14	Belgian Pro League	37	5	2	0	—		6	0	1	0	46	5
Anderlecht	2014–15	Belgian Pro League	30	7	2	1	—		6	1	1	0	39	9
Anderlecht	2015–16 (Note: Some sources, e.g. WorldFootball.net, attribute Anderlecht's third goal against Club Brugge on 25 October 2015 to Praet; that goal and two others in the same match were officially ruled by the Pro League to be own goals.)	Belgian Pro League	37	6	0	0	—		9 (Note: Appearance(s) in UEFA Europa League)	0	—		46	6
Anderlecht	2016–17	Belgian Pro League	1	0	0	0	—		1	0	—		2	0
Anderlecht	Total		139	20	12	4	—		28	2	3	1	182	27
Sampdoria	2016–17	Serie A	32	1	2	0	—		—		—		34	1
Sampdoria	2017–18	Serie A	32	1	3	0	—		—		—		35	1
Sampdoria	2018–19	Serie A	34	2	3	0	—		—		—		37	2
Sampdoria	Total		98	4	8	0	—		—		—		106	4
Leicester City	2019–20	Premier League	27	1	4	0	5	0	—		—		36	1
Leicester City	2020–21	Premier League	15	1	2	0	1	0	6	1	—		24	2
Leicester City	2022–23	Premier League	22	1	2	0	3	0	—		—		27	1
Leicester City	2023–24	Championship	17	0	2	1	1	0	—		—		20	1
Leicester City	Total		81	3	10	1	10	0	6	1	—		107	5
Torino (loan)	2021–22	Serie A	23	2	1	0	—		—		—		24	2
Career total			339	29	31	5	10	0	34	3	3	1	417	38

=== International ===
As of match played 11 June 2022

Appearances and goals by national team and year
National team	Year	Apps	Goals
Belgium	2014	1	0
Belgium	2015	0	0
Belgium	2016	0	0
Belgium	2017	0	0
Belgium	2018	1	0
Belgium	2019	4	0
Belgium	2020	3	0
Belgium	2021	5	2
Belgium	2022	1	0
Total		15	2

As of match played 11 June 2022
Belgium score listed first, score column indicates score after each Praet goal

List of international goals scored by Dennis Praet
No.	Date	Venue	Cap	Opponent	Score	Result	Competition	Ref.
1	30 March 2021	Den Dreef, Leuven, Belgium	10	Belarus	5–0	8–0	2022 FIFA World Cup qualification	
2	8 September 2021	Central Stadium, Kazan, Russia	14	Belarus	1–0	1–0	2022 FIFA World Cup qualification	

== Honours ==
Anderlecht

- Belgian Pro League: 2011–12, 2012–13, 2013–14
- Belgian Super Cup: 2012, 2013, 2014

Leicester City

- FA Cup: 2020–21
- EFL Championship: 2023–24

Individual

- Best player of AEGON Future Cup: 2011
- Belgian Golden Shoe: 2014
