= 2010–11 Standard Liège season =

Standard Liège
2010–11 season
- Chairman: (Switzerland) Reto Stiffler
- Manager: (Belgium) Dominique D'Onofrio
- Stadium: Stade Maurice Dufrasne
- Belgian Pro League: 6th
- Belgian Cup: Winners
- Top goalscorer: Mehdi Carcela (13)

During the 2010–11 Belgian football season, Standard Liège competed in the Belgian Pro League.

== Season summary ==
This is the first season since 2003-04 that Standard Liège did not compete in a European competition. Standard Liège started off the season with a 1–1 draw S.V. Zulte-Waregem. Standard Liège won the Belgium Cup defeating K.V.C. Westerlo 2–0 in the final. In the Championship play-off, Standard Liège came in second to qualify for the Champions League Third qualifying round.

At the end of the season, Dominique D'Onofrio's contract ended and was not renewed.

== Kit ==
Liège's kits were sponsored by e-lotto.be and its kit-maker being Planete Rouge.

== First-team squad ==
Squad at end of season

Note: Flags indicate national team as defined under FIFA eligibility rules; some limited exceptions apply. Players may hold more than one non-FIFA nationality.

No.	Pos.	Nation	Player
1	GK	BEL	Kristof Van Hout
2	DF	BEL	Réginal Goreux
3	DF	BRA	Victor Ramos
4	DF	GHA	Daniel Opare
5	DF	BRA	Felipe
6	DF	BEL	Laurent Ciman
7	MF	FRA	Wilfried Dalmat
8	MF	BEL	Steven Defour (captain)
9	FW	COD	Dieumerci Mbokani
10	FW	BEL	Mohamed Tchité
11	MF	MAR	Mehdi Carcela
13	FW	CMR	Aloys Nong
14	MF	BRA	Danilo Sousa Campos
15	DF	BEL	Sébastien Pocognoli
16	DF	MAR	Abdelfettah Boukhriss
20	MF	BEL	Leroy Labylle
22	DF	FRA	Eliaquim Mangala

No.	Pos.	Nation	Player
23	MF	BEL	Tom De Mul (on loan from Sevilla)
24	MF	BEL	Koen Daerden
25	DF	BRA	Kanu
27	MF	BEL	Arnor Angeli
28	MF	BEL	Axel Witsel
29	FW	CIV	Gohi Bi Zoro Cyriac
30	FW	BEL	Michy Batshuayi
31	MF	BEL	Tino Susic
32	MF	BEL	Christopher Verbist
33	GK	MNE	Srdjan Blažić
35	MF	TOG	Henri Eninful
36	MF	SEN	Pape Abdou Camara
37	DF	BEL	Jelle Van Damme
38	GK	TUR	Sinan Bolat
77	MF	ROU	Gheorghe Grozav
99	FW	SEN	Mbaye Leye

=== Left the Club ===
Note: Flags indicate national team as defined under FIFA eligibility rules; some limited exceptions apply. Players may hold more than one non-FIFA nationality.

No.	Pos.	Nation	Player
6	MF	FRA	Cédric Collet (Unattached)
10	FW	BRA	Igor de Camargo (Borussia Mönchengladbach)
14	DF	BEL	Landry Mulemo (to Bucaspor)
15	FW	BEL	Andréa Mbuyi-Mutombo (on loan to Sint-Truidense V.V.)
16	MF	BEL	Grégory Dufer (to Sint-Truidense V.V.)
17	DF	BRA	Camozzato (to Club Brugge KV)

No.	Pos.	Nation	Player
18	GK	BEL	Jesse Soubry (to Royale Union Saint-Gilloise)
19	DF	SEN	Mohamed Sarr (to Hércules CF)
23	FW	SRB	Milan Jovanović (Liverpool)
25	FW	BEL	Christian Benteke (on loan to Mechelen)
26	MF	FRA	Benjamin Nicaise (to Lierse S.K.)

== Results ==
=== Belgian Cup ===
==== Sixth round ====
27 October 2010
20:30 CET

Standard Liège	2 - 1	Royal Antwerp (II)
Opare 44'; Nong 57'		De Vriese 21'

Stade Maurice Dufrasne, Liège

==== Seventh round ====
9 November 2010
20:45 CET

Standard Liège	2 – 1	Genk
Witsel 19' (pen.); Tchité 58'		Leye 36' (o.g.)

Stade Maurice Dufrasne, Liège

==== Quarterfinals ====
===== First legs =====
26 January 2011
20:35 CET

Standard Liège	2 – 0	Mechelen
Tchité 24'; Daerden 53'

Stade Maurice Dufrasne, Liège

===== Second legs =====
2 March 2011
20:30 CET

Mechelen	1 – 4	Standard Liège
Gorius 70' (pen.)		Leye 48', 72'; Tchité 64'; Witsel 68'

Argosstadion Achter de Kazerne, Mechelen

Standard wins 6–1 on aggregate.

==== Semifinals ====
===== First legs =====
16 March 2011

Gent	1 – 0	Standard Liège
El Ghanassy 29'

Jules Ottenstadion, Ghent

===== Second legs =====
6 April 2011

Standard Liège	4 – 2	Gent
Van Damme 19'; Tchité 33', 74'; Carcela 69'		Coulibaly 20'; Mboyo 82'

Stade Maurice Dufrasne, Liège

Standard wins 4–3 on aggregate.

==== Final ====
21 May 2011
20:30

Westerlo	0 – 2	Standard Liège
		Mangala 34'; Mravac 61' (o.g.)

King Baudouin Stadium, Brussels
Referee: Frank De Bleeckere
