= 2011–12 Standard Liège season =

Standard Liège
2011–12 season
- Chairman: Roland Duchâtelet
- Manager: José Riga
- Stadium: Stade Maurice Dufrasne
- Belgian Pro League: 4th
- Belgian Cup: Quarter-finals
- Belgian Super Cup: Runners-up
- UEFA Champions League: Third qualifying round
- UEFA Europa League: Round of 16
- Top goalscorer: League: Mohammed Tchité (11); All: Mohammed Tchité (18)
Home colours	Away colours	Third colours

The 2011–12 season was the 114th in the history of Standard Liège and their 92nd consecutive season in the top flight. The club participated in the Belgian Pro League, the Belgian Cup, Belgian Super Cup, UEFA Champions League, and UEFA Europa League.

== Players ==
Note: Flags indicate national team as defined under FIFA eligibility rules; some limited exceptions apply. Players may hold more than one non-FIFA nationality.

No.	Pos.	Nation	Player
2	DF	HAI	Réginal Goreux
3	DF	FRA	Karim Belhocine
4	DF	GHA	Daniel Opare
5	DF	BRA	Felipe
6	DF	BEL	Laurent Ciman
7	MF	ISL	Birkir Bjarnason
8	MF	ISR	Maor Buzaglo
10	FW	BEL	Mohammed Tchité
11	FW	CIV	Cyriac
14	MF	URU	Ignacio González
15	DF	BEL	Sébastien Pocognoli
17	MF	BEL	Yoni Buyens
18	GK	BEL	Anthony Moris
20	MF	VEN	Luis Manuel Seijas

No.	Pos.	Nation	Player
21	MF	FRA	William Vainqueur
23	FW	BEL	Michy Batshuayi
25	DF	BRA	Kanu
27	GK	BEL	Laurent Henkinet
36	DF	BEL	Dino Arslanagic
37	DF	BEL	Jelle Van Damme (captain)
38	GK	TUR	Sinan Bolat
40	MF	BEL	Paul-Jose M'Poku
41	MF	BEL	Franco Zennaro
44	MF	BEL	Ibrahima Cissé
49	DF	BEL	Jonathan Hendrickx
55	DF	ISR	Rami Gershon
77	FW	TOG	Serge Gakpé (on loan from Nantes)
89	MF	BEL	Geoffrey Mujangi Bia

== Pre-season and friendlies ==
Win Draw Loss

25 June 2011 Friendly	Richelle United (Belgium)	1–6	(Belgium) Standard Liège	Blegny
19:00 CEST (UTC+2)				Stadium: Complexe sportif

29 June 2011 Friendly	Hannut (Belgium)	0–7	(Belgium) Standard Liège	Hannut
19:00 CEST (UTC+2)				Stadium: Stade Alfred Ducarme

2 July 2011 Friendly	Namur (Belgium)	0–4	(Belgium) Standard Liège	Namur
19:00 CEST (UTC+2)				Stadium: Stade Communal des Bas-Prés

6 July 2011 Friendly	Tienen (Belgium)	1–2	(Belgium) Standard Liège	Tienen
20:00 CEST (UTC+2)				Stadium: Bergéstadion

9 July 2011 Friendly	Standard Liège (Belgium)	1–2	(France) Sedan	Eghezée
19:00 CEST (UTC+2)				Stadium: Stade Bernard Rubay

15 July 2011 Friendly	Standard Liège (Belgium)	3–0	(Netherlands) Twente	Tubize
18:00 CEST (UTC+2)				Stadium: Stade Leburton

16 July 2011 Friendly	Standard Liège (Belgium)	1–3	(Turkey) Fenerbahçe	Tubize
20:00 CEST (UTC+2)				Stadium: Stade Leburton

7 January 2012 Friendly	Borussia Dortmund (Germany)	3–0	(Belgium) Standard Liège	La Manga
16:00 CET (UTC+1)				Stadium: La Manga Club Football Centre A

== Competitions ==
=== Overall record ===
Competition	First match	Last match	Starting round	Final position	Record							
Competition	First match	Last match	Starting round	Final position	Pld	W	D	L	GF	GA	GD	Win %
Belgian Pro League	30 July 2011	21 March 2012	Matchday 1	4th	40	16	12	12	53	50	+3	40.00
Belgian Cup	21 September 2011	18 January 2012	Round 6	Quarter-finals	4	3	0	1	14	8	+6	75.00
UEFA Champions League	27 July 2011	3 August 2011	Third qualifying round	Third qualifying round	2	0	1	1	1	2	−1	0.00
UEFA Europa League	18 August 2011	25 August 2011	Play-off round	Round of 16	12	6	5	1	17	10	+7	50.00
Total					58	25	18	15	85	70	+15	43.10

Source: Competitions

=== Belgian Pro League ===
==== Regular season ====
Pos	Team	Pld	W	D	L	GF	GA	GD	Pts	Qualification
2	Club Brugge	30	19	4	7	51	32	+19	61	Qualification to Championship play-offs
3	Gent	30	17	5	8	63	35	+28	56	Qualification to Championship play-offs
4	Standard Liège	30	14	9	7	43	33	+10	51	Qualification to Championship play-offs
5	Genk	30	13	7	10	60	44	+16	46	Qualification to Championship play-offs
6	Kortrijk	30	13	7	10	39	36	+3	46	Qualification to Championship play-offs

Source: soccerway.com
Rules for classification: 1) points; 2) number of matches won; if teams are still tied a playoff is organised.

==== Matches ====
30 July 2011 1	Mons	1–1	Standard Liège
18:00 CEST (UTC+2)

7 August 2011 2	Standard Liège	3–1	Lokeren
18:00 CEST (UTC+2)

13 August 2011 3	Gent	3–1	Standard Liège
18:00 CEST (UTC+2)

21 August 2011 4	Standard Liège	3–1	Kortrijk
20:30 CEST (UTC+2)

28 August 2011 5	Beerschot	1–1	Standard Liège
20:30 CEST (UTC+2)

10 September 2011 6	Standard Liège	1–0	Westerlo
20:00 CEST (UTC+2)

18 September 2011 7	Genk	3–0	Standard Liège
18:00 CEST (UTC+2)

25 September 2011 8	Standard Liège	0–0	Cercle Brugge
20:30 CEST (UTC+2)

2 October 2011 9	Standard Liège	2–0	Lierse
14:30 CEST (UTC+2)

16 October 2011 10	Anderlecht	5–0	Standard Liège
18:00 CEST (UTC+2)

23 October 2011 11	Standard Liège	1–0	Zulte Waregem
20:30 CEST (UTC+2)

30 October 2011 12	Sint-Truiden	1–1	Standard Liège
20:30 CET (UTC+1)

6 November 2011 13	Standard Liège	2–1	Club Brugge
20:30 CEST (UTC+2)

18 November 2011 14	OH Leuven	1–3	Standard Liège
20:30 CET (UTC+1)

25 November 2011 15	Standard Liège	3–2	Mechelen
20:30 CEST (UTC+2)

4 December 2011 16	Standard Liège	0–0	Gent
18:00 CEST (UTC+2)

10 December 2011 17	Lokeren	1–1	Standard Liège
18:00 CEST (UTC+2)

18 December 2011 18	Standard Liège	0–0	Genk
14:30 CEST (UTC+2)

==== Championship playoff ====
Pos	Team	Pld	W	D	L	GF	GA	GD	Pts	Qualification
1	Anderlecht (C)	10	5	3	2	16	8	+8	52	Qualification to Champions League third qualifying round
2	Club Brugge (Q)	10	5	2	3	14	11	+3	48	Qualification to Champions League third qualifying round
3	Genk (Q)	10	6	0	4	19	19	0	41	Qualification to Europa League third qualifying round
4	Gent	10	4	0	6	16	16	0	40	Qualification to Europa League Testmatch
5	Standard Liège	10	2	3	5	10	17	−7	35	
6	Kortrijk	10	3	2	5	16	20	−4	34	

Source: soccerway.com
Rules for classification: 1) points; 2) points after deduction of (possible) half points added due to rounding; 3) number of wins; 4) goal difference; 5) number of goals scored; 6) number of away goals scored; 7) number of away wins.
(C) Champions; (Q) Qualified for the phase indicated

=== Belgian Cup ===
21 September 2011 Round 6	Hoogstraten	2–8	Standard Liège	Liège
CEST (UTC+2)	Mathyssen 21'; Fockaert 25'		Tchité 23', 28', 37'; Van Damme 31'; Nong 44', 71'; Buyens 67'; Seijas 68'	Stadium: Stade Maurice Dufrasne

26 October 2011 Round 7	Zulte Waregem	1–2	Standard Liège	Waregem
CEST (UTC+2)

21 December 2011 Quarter-finals; First leg	Lierse	1–2	Standard Liège	Lierse
CET (UTC+1)

21 December 2011 Quarter-finals; Second leg	Standard Liège	2–4 (4–5 agg.)	Lierse	Liège
CET (UTC+1)				Stadium: Stade Maurice Dufrasne

=== UEFA Champions League ===
==== Third qualifying round ====
27 July 2011 First leg	Standard Liège (Belgium)	1–1	(Switzerland) Zürich	Liège
20:15 CEST (UTC+2)	González 90'		Mehmedi 79'	Stadium: Stade Maurice Dufrasne; Attendance: 13,727; Referee: Alon Yefet (Israel)

3 August 2011 Second leg	Zürich (Switzerland)	1–0 (2–1 agg.)	(Belgium) Standard Liège	Zürich
20:15 CEST (UTC+2)	Mehmedi 58'			Stadium: Letzigrund; Attendance: 10,500; Referee: Paolo Valeri (Italy)

=== UEFA Europa League ===
==== Play-off round ====
18 August 2011 First leg	Standard Liège (Belgium)	1–0	(Sweden) Helsingborg	Liège
20:15 CEST (UTC+2)	Tchité 60'			Stadium: Stade Maurice Dufrasne; Attendance: 10,457; Referee: Bülent Yıldırım (Turkey)

25 August 2011 Second leg	Helsingborg (Sweden)	1–3 (1–4 agg.)	(Belgium) Standard Liège	Helsingborg
20:15 CEST (UTC+2)	Jönsson 61' (pen.)		Mbaye 14'; Berrier 34'; Kanu 68'	Stadium: Olympia; Attendance: 6,656; Referee: Saïd Ennjimi (France)

==== Group stage ====
Pos	Team	Pld	W	D	L	GF	GA	GD	Pts	Qualification	SL	HAN	COP	VP
1	(Belgium) Standard Liège	6	4	2	0	9	1	+8	14	Advance to knockout phase	—	2–0	3–0	0–0
2	(Germany) Hannover 96	6	3	2	1	9	7	+2	11	Advance to knockout phase	0–0	—	2–2	3–1
3	(Denmark) Copenhagen	6	1	2	3	5	9	−4	5		0–1	1–2	—	1–0
4	(Ukraine) Vorskla Poltava	6	0	2	4	4	10	−6	2		1–3	1–2	1–1	—

Source: Soccerway

15 September 2011 1	Hannover 96 (Germany)	0–0	(Belgium) Standard Liège	Hanover
19:00 CEST (UTC+2)				Stadium: AWD-Arena; Attendance: 42,500; Referee: Aleksandar Stavrev (Macedonia)

29 September 2011 2	Standard Liège (Belgium)	3–0	(Denmark) Copenhagen	Liège
21:05 CEST (UTC+2)	Seijas 57'; Felipe 72'; Kanu 79'			Stadium: Stade Maurice Dufrasne; Attendance: 13,368; Referee: Anastassios Kakos (Greece)

20 October 2011 3	Standard Liège (Belgium)	0–0	(Ukraine) Vorskla Poltava	Liège
21:05 CEST (UTC+2)				Stadium: Stade Maurice Dufrasne; Attendance: 13,496; Referee: Simon Lee Evans (Wales)

3 November 2011 4	Vorskla Poltava (Ukraine)	1–3	(Belgium) Standard Liège	Poltava
19:00 CET (UTC+1)	Kurylov 5'		Seijas 17'; Kanu 45+4'; Tchité 74'	Stadium: Butovsky Vorskla Stadium; Attendance: 8,000; Referee: Libor Kovařik (Czech Republic)

30 November 2011 5	Standard Liège (Belgium)	2–0	(Germany) Hannover 96	Liège
21:05 CET (UTC+1)	Tchité 26'; Cyriac 59'			Stadium: Stade Maurice Dufrasne; Attendance: 18,104; Referee: Antonio Damato (Italy)

15 December 2011 6	Copenhagen (Denmark)	0–1	(Belgium) Standard Liège	Copenhagen
19:00 CET (UTC+1)			Batshuayi 31'	Stadium: Parken Stadium; Attendance: 9,722; Referee: Hüseyin Göçek (Turkey)

==== Knockout phase ====
===== Round of 32 =====
16 February 2012 First leg	Wisła Kraków (Poland)	1–1	(Belgium) Standard Liège	Kraków
21:05 CET (UTC+1)	Genkov 88'		Cyriac 27' (pen.)	Stadium: Stadion Miejski im. Henryka Reymana; Attendance: 19,000; Referee: David Fernández Borbalán (Spain)

23 February 2012 Second leg	Standard Liège (Belgium)	0–0 (1 (a)–1 agg.)	(Poland) Wisła Kraków	Liège
19:00 CET (UTC+1)				Stadium: Stade Maurice Dufrasne; Attendance: 20,289; Referee: Milorad Mažić (Serbia)

===== Round of 16 =====
8 March 2012 First leg	Standard Liège (Belgium)	2–2	(Germany) Hannover 96	Liège
21:05 CET (UTC+1)	Buyens 27'; Tchité 30'		Stindl 22' (pen.); Diouf 56'	Stadium: Stade Maurice Dufrasne; Attendance: 17,498; Referee: Tony Chapron (France)

15 March 2012 Second leg	Hannover 96 (Germany)	4–0 (6–2 agg.)	(Belgium) Standard Liège	Hanover
19:00 CET (UTC+1)	Abdellaoue 4'; Kanu 21', 73' (o.g.); Pinto 90+3'			Stadium: AWD-Arena; Attendance: 43,000; Referee: Pavel Královec (Czech Republic)
