= 2011 Belgian Super Cup =

Genk	Standard Liège
1	0
- Date: 21 July 2011
- Venue: Cristal Arena, Genk
- Referee: Luc Wouters

The 2011 Belgian Super Cup was a football match played on 21 July 2011 between 2010–11 Belgian Pro League winners Genk and 2010–11 Belgian Cup winners Standard Liège. Genk won the game one nil and with that won their first Super Cup, after being on the losing end on five previous occasions.

== Match details ==
2011-07-21
18:00 CET

Genk	1–0	Standard Liège
Tőzsér 45+1'	Report

Cristal Arena, Genk
Attendance: around 7,000
Referee: Luc Wouters

KRC GENK:
GK	26	(Hungary) László Köteles
DF	16	(South Africa) Anele
DF	4	(Germany) Torben Joneleit
DF	20	(Brazil) Nadson	(yellow card) 16'
MF	33	(Czech Republic) Daniel Pudil	(yellow card) 41'
DF	11	(Belgium) Anthony Vanden Borre		(substituted off) 78'
MF	6	(Belgium) David Hubert (c)
MF	8	(Hungary) Dániel Tőzsér
MF	14	(Belgium) Kevin De Bruyne		(substituted off) 89'
FW	9	(Belgium) Jelle Vossen	(red card) 28'
FW	27	(Nigeria) Kennedy
Substitutes:
GK	32	(Belgium) Gilles Lentz
DF	15	(Tunisia) Fabien Camus		(substituted on) 89'
DF	24	(Belgium) Timothy Durwael
FW	18	(Israel) Elyaniv Barda
FW	19	(Belgium) Thomas Buffel		(substituted on) 78'
FW	31	(Belgium) Marvin Ogunjimi
MF	35	(Belgium) Anthony Limbombe
Manager:
(Belgium) Franky Vercauteren

STANDARD LIEGE:
GK	38	(Turkey) Sinan Bolat	(yellow card) 45'
DF	6	(Belgium) Laurent Ciman		(substituted off) 35'
DF	25	(Brazil) Kanu
DF	4	(Ghana) Daniel Opare		(substituted off) 38'
DF	15	(Belgium) Sébastien Pocognoli
FW	99	(Senegal) Mbaye Leye	(yellow card) 52'
MF	34	(Senegal) Pape Abdou Camara		(substituted off) 67'
MF	2	(Belgium) Réginal Goreux
FW	13	(Cameroon) Aloys Nong
DF	37	(Belgium) Jelle Van Damme (c)	(yellow card) 86'
FW	10	(Belgium) Mohammed Tchité
Substitutes:
GK	33	(Montenegro) Srđan Blažić
DF	3	(France) (Algeria) Karim Belhocine		(substituted on) 38'
DF	5	(Brazil) Felipe		(substituted on) 35'
DF	7	(Belgium) Michy
FW	9	(Belgium) Christian Benteke		(substituted on) 67'
DF	16	(Morocco) Abdelfettah Boukhriss
MF	17	(Belgium) Yoni Buyens
Manager:
(Belgium) José Riga

Match rules

- 90 minutes
- No extra-time if scores still level, instead there will be a penalty shoot-out
- 7 named substitutes
- Maximum of 7 substitutions

== See also ==
- 2011–12 Belgian Pro League
- 2011–12 Belgian Cup
