= 2011 Belgian Cup final =

- Event: 2010–11 Belgian Cup
Westerlo	Standard Liège
0	2
- Date: 21 May 2011
- Venue: King Baudouin Stadium, Brussels
- Referee: Frank De Bleeckere

The 2011 Belgian Cup final, named Cofidis Cup after the sponsor, was played on 21 May 2011 between Westerlo and Standard Liège. It was the sixth time Standard Liège won the Belgian Cup, 18 years having passed since their last trophy in the competition.

== Road to the Final ==
Westerlo		Round	Standard	
Roeselare [D2] H 2–0	Mravac 55'; Dekelver 76'	Round Six	Antwerp [D2] H 2–0	Opare 44'; Nong 57'
Anderlecht [D1] H 1–0	Henrique 47'	Round Seven	Genk [D1] H 2–1	Witsel 19' (pen.); Tchité 58'
Lierse [D1] H 1–2	Dekelver 44'	Quarter Finals; First Leg	Mechelen [D1] H 2–0	Tchité 24'; Daerden 53'
Lierse [D1] A 2–3	De Petter 32'; Henrique 60'; Dekelver 69'	Quarter Finals; Second Leg	Mechelen [D1] A 1–4	Leye 48', 72'; Tchité 64'; Witsel 68'
Cercle Brugge [D1] H 0–0		Semi-finals; First Leg	Gent [D1] A 1–0	
Cercle Brugge [D1] A 3–3	Henrique 45+1', 61'; Ngolok 58'	Semi-finals; Second Leg	Gent [D1] H 4–2	Van Damme 19'; Tchité 33', 74'; Carcela 69'

- Both clubs received a bye to round six.
- In square brackets is a letter that represents the opposition's division
  - [D1] = Belgian First Division
  - [D2] = Belgian Second Division

== Match details ==
21 May 2011
20:30 CET

Westerlo	0–2	Standard Liège
		Mangala 34'; Mravac 61' (o.g.)

King Baudouin Stadium, Brussels
Referee: Frank De Bleeckere

Westerlo	Standard

WESTERLO:
GK	30	(Belgium) Bart Deelkens
DF	4	(Belgium) Wouter Corstjens
DF	18	(Belgium) Jef Delen (c)
MF	24	(Belgium) Jens Cools
DF	27	(Bosnia and Herzegovina) Adnan Mravac
DF	3	(Belgium) Steven De Petter	(yellow card) 82'
MF	8	(Belgium) Christian Brüls
FW	22	(Ukraine) Oleksandr Yakovenko		(substituted off) 72'
MF	28	(Cameroon) Evariste Ngolok
FW	7	(Belgium) Dieter Dekelver		(substituted off) 72'
FW	12	(Brazil) Paulo Henrique
Substitutes:
GK	1	(Belgium) Yves De Winter
FW	9	(Brazil) Ellenton Liliu		(substituted on) 72'
FW	10	(Belgium) Lens Annab		(substituted on) 72'
DF	16	(Belgium) Joris Van Hout
MF	21	(Belgium) Rachid Farssi
MF	23	(Belgium) Jarno Molenberghs
DF	32	(Belgium) Günther Vanaudenaerde
Manager:
(Belgium) Jan Ceulemans

STANDARD:
GK	38	(Turkey) Sinan Bolat
DF	4	(Ghana) Daniel Opare
DF	16	(Morocco) Abdelfettah Boukhriss
DF	22	(France) Eliaquim Mangala
DF	25	(Brazil) Kanu
MF	2	(Belgium) Réginal Goreux		(substituted off) 78'
MF	8	(Belgium) Steven Defour (c)
MF	28	(Belgium) Axel Witsel
MF	34	(Senegal) Pape Abdou Camara
MF	37	(Belgium) Jelle Van Damme	(yellow card) 53'	(substituted off) 86'
FW	10	(Burundi) Mohammed Tchité		(substituted off) 90'
Substitutes:
GK	33	(Montenegro) Srđan Blažić
DF	5	(Brazil) Felipe
DF	6	(Belgium) Laurent Ciman
MF	7	(France) Franck Berrier
FW	13	(Cameroon) Aloys Nong		(substituted on) 86'
MF	24	(Belgium) Koen Daerden		(substituted on) 90'
FW	99	(Senegal) Mbaye Leye		(substituted on) 78'
Manager:
(Belgium) Dominique D'Onofrio

=== Match Rules ===
- 90 minutes.
- 30 minutes of extra-time if necessary.
- Penalty shoot-out if scores still level.
- Maximum 7 named substitutes
- Maximum of 3 substitutions.

== See also ==
- 2010–11 Belgian Cup
