= 2010–11 Belgian Cup =

Tournament details
- Country: Belgium

Final positions
- Champions: Standard Liège
- Runners-up: Westerlo

The 2010–11 Belgian Cup (also known as Cofidis Cup because of sponsoring purposes) is the 56th season of the main knockout football competition in Belgium. It commenced on 24 July 2010 with the first matches of Round 1 and will conclude with the Final in May 2011. K. A. A. Gent are the defending champions having won their third Belgian Cup in the 2009-10 season.

== Competition modus ==
The competition consisted of ten rounds. The first seven rounds were held as single-match elimination rounds. When tied after 90 minutes in the first three rounds, penalties were taken immediately. In rounds four to seven, when tied after 90 minutes first an extra time period of 30 minutes was played, then penalties were taken if still necessary. The quarter- and semifinals were played in a two-leg modus, where the team winning on aggregate advanced. The Final was then again played as a single match.

Teams entered the competition in different rounds, based upon their 2009–10 league affiliation. Teams from the fourth-level Promotion or lower began in Round 1. Third Division teams entered in Round 3, with Second Division teams joining in the following round. Teams from the Belgian First Division entered in Round 6.

== Starting Rounds ==
The starting five rounds featured only teams of lower divisions and all matches were played during the summer and early fall, mostly in July and August.

=== Round 1 ===
The matches were played on 23 through 27 July 2010.

Tie no	Home team	Score	Away team
1	K.SC.Menen	3–0	K.SV.Rumbeke
2	S.V.V.Damme	0–2	VG.Oostende
3	SK.Oostnieuwkerke	0–3	Sporting W.I.Harelbeke
4	K.V.C.S.V.Oostkamp	1–2	KSK Maldegem
5	K.Excelsior Zedelgem	1–0	K.SV.Bredene
6	K.Sassport Boezinge	8–0	K.SK.Steenbrugge
7	K.FC.Varsenare	3–0	SK.Bellem
8	ASS.Montkainoise	3–4	K.BS.Poperinge
9	K.Sint-Eloois-Winkel	1–0	Sp. Olympic de Warcoing
10	SK.Eernegem	2–0	VC.K.Zwevegem Sport
11	K.VK.Ieper	4–0	R.Knokke FC
12	R.RC.Peruwelz	5–0	K.WS.Club Lauwe
13	Club Roeselare	0–2	K.FC.Sparta Petegem
14	K.SV.Moorsele	0–3	K.SV.Diksmuide
15	KFC.Vrasene	1–1 (p 8–7)	K.VV.Kl.Kemzeke
16	K.FC.Herleving Sinaai	1–0	K.VV.Zelzate
17	KFC Olympic Burst	1–4	K.Racing Club Bambrugge
18	R.RC.Gent-Zeehaven	3–1	K.Eendr.Opstal
19	K.SV.Sottegem	1–0	K.FC.Evergem-Center
20	FC.Kerksken	0–2	K.FC.Eendr.Zele
21	SV.Voorde	1–3	K.FC.Merelbeke
22	K.SK.Lebbeke	0–1	Verbroedering Meldert
23	SK.Berlare	1–0	K.VK.Ninove
24	K.E.Appelterre-Eichem	2–0	K.FC.Eeklo
25	K.F.A.C.Waarschoot	0–2	K.FC.Sp.St-Gillis Waas
26	K.VC.Jong Lede	1–3	SK.Terjoden-Welle
27	Sp.Roosbeek	2–2 (p 4–5)	Dilbeek Sport
28	Voorwaarts Mollem	1–2	Tempo Overijse
29	K.FC.Rapide Wezemaal	0–4	K.Olympia SC.Wijgmaal
30	FC.Baal	1–1 (p 5–3)	VC.Kester
31	R.Léopold Uccle FC.	2–1	Blue Star Bruxelles
32	FC.Ganshoren K.Everbeur	0–0 (p 2–4)	Sport Averbode
33	R.FC.Evere	1–2	K.FC.Wambeek
34	FC.Merchtem 2000	1–4	K.Wolvertem SC.
35	K.FC.Meise	0–2	FC.Rillaar Sport
36	K.Vilvoorde FC.	0–3	K.Londerzeel SK.
37	SK.St.P.Opwijk	0–0 (p 4–2)	Sport.Oud Heverlee Leuven
38	Lubbeek St-Martinus Sport	1–3	KFC.Rhodienne-De Hoek
39	K.V.Bonheiden	2–6	K.FC.Duffel
40	K.VV.Belg.-Edegem Sp.	0–5	K.FC.St.-Lenaarts
41	K.SK.Wavria	0–1	K.Sint-Job FC.
42	K.FC.Jong VL.Kruibeke	7–1	K.SK.Sefa Herentals
43	K.Wijnegem VC.	0–0 (p 5–4)	K.Vlimmeren Sport
44	K.FC.Lille	3–0	K.VV.Vosselaar
45	K.AC.Olen	0–4	K.FC.Zwarte Leeuw
46	FC.Mariekerke	2–4	K.FC.De Kempen T.L.
47	K.Lyra TSV.	8–0	K.Verbr.Hemiksem
48	K.FC.Katelijne-Waver	4–1	SK.Wilrijk
49	K.Berchem Sport 2004	2–1	K.VC.Houtvenne
50	K.Schelle Sport	1–4	KFC.Oosterzonen Oosterw.
51	K.VV.Dosko Baarle-Hertog	0–2	K.RC.Mechelen
52	VC.Herentals	5–0	K.VC.Willebroek-Meerhof
53	VV.Thes Sport Tessenderlo	2–0	Cobox 76
54	K.Esperanza Neerpelt	1–3	K.Witgoor Sport Dessel
55	K.VK.Zepperen	0–2	Waltwilder V.V.
56	K.VV.Weerstand Koersel	3–1	K.FC.Flandria Paal

Tie no	Home team	Score	Away team
57	Kadijk SK.Overpelt	0–1	K.FC.Mol
58	K.SK.Meeuwen	0–4	K.Herk-De-Stad FC.
59	K.Lutlommel VV.	5–0	Sport.Nevok.Gruitrode
60	K.VK.Wellen	1–1 (p 2–3)	K.ESK.Leopoldsburg
61	Spouwen-Mopertingen	0–0 (p 4–5)	SK.Moelingen
62	K.VV.Heusden-Zolder	1–2	SC.Zichen-Zussen-Bolder
63	Runkst VV.	2–5	K.Sportclub Tongeren
64	FC.Ezaart Sport Mol	0–1	K.Overpeltse VV.
65	K.Patro Eisden Maasmech.	4–0	KVC.Ross.Hulsen Sportief
66	K.Zonhoven VV.	0–3	Exc.Veldwezelt
67	K.SK.Bree	3–2	RC.Hades
68	K.Vlijtingen VV.	8–3	Riemst Vooruit
69	R.US.Genly-Quevy 89	0–3	Club Olympic Trivières
70	Amicale Club Morlanwelz	0–4	CS.Entité Manageoise
71	FC.Vacresse	1–2	FC.Saint-Vaast
72	SC.Montignies	1–1 (p 4–5)	R.FC.Bioul 81
73	Ass.Sp.Chimay-Virelles	1–8	Royal Baileux Sport
74	R.Geants Athois	13–0	R.FC.Surice
75	FC.Rapid Symphorinois	0–2	F.Couillet-La Louvière
76	Ent.Sportive Elouges	1–2	Dour CS.Onhaye
77	Union Entité Estinnoise	2–3	Bracquegnies Sp.
78	R.Soignies Sports	0–2	R.ES.Couvin-Mariembourg
79	R.Stade Brainois	5–1	Racing Jet Wavre
80	La Jeun.Sportive Morialmé	0–7	Pont-A Celles-Buzet
81	FC.Ligny	0–5	JS.Taminoise
82	R.CS.Brainois	0–1	St.Ghisl.-Tertre-Hautrage
83	R.FC.Grand-Leez	5–2	R.RFC.Montegnée
84	R.AC.Leuze-Longchamps	1–1 (p 1–3)	AC.Hombourg
85	R.Jeun.Aischoise	3–1	R.Arquet FC.
86	K.FC.Weywertz	0–3	R.Sprimont Comblain Sport
87	R.AF.Franchimontois	2–3	R.FC.Meux
88	R.W.Walhain CG.	11–1	R.Skill FC.D'Ivoz-Ramet
89	Football Club Cheratte	4–1	FC.Jupille
90	R.FC. 1912 Raeren	4–0	Ent.Sp.Fernelmont
91	SC.Petit-Waret	1–3	R.S.C.Beaufays
92	R.FC.Tilleur St.-Gilles	2–0	FC.St-Germain
93	R.Avenir Fouron FC.	1–2	ET.Elsautoise
94	R.CS.Verlaine	1–2	R.Aywaille FC.
95	R.FC.Hannutois	7–1	R.Etoile Sp.Dalhemoise
96	RFC.Turkania Faymonville	0–0 (p 3–1)	Grupo Desportivo Poulseur
97	R.FC.Vyle-Tharoul	3–2	R.RC.Hamoir
98	RJS.Bas-Oha	6–0	R.FC.Croatia Wandre
99	R.FC.Union La Calamine	2–2 (p 9–10)	R.Ent.Blegnytoise
100	R.FC.Sérésien	1–0	Cité Sport Grace-Hollogne
101	R.OC.Meix-Dt-Virton	1–0	R.Jeunesse Reunie d'Aye
102	R.ES.Champlonaise	0–1	R.CS.Condruzien
103	US.Martelangeoise	0–3	R.LC.Bastogne
104	R.All.FC.Oppagne-Wéris	1–1 (p 5–3)	R.RC.Mormont
105	FC.Montleban	5–2	ES.Jamoigne
106	FC.Jeun.Lorr.Arlonaise	3–0	J.Rochefortoise Jemelle A
107	US.Beauraing 61	0–3	ES.Wellinoise
108	R.RC.Longlier	1–7	R.Standard FC.Bièvre
109	R.US.Givry	8–0	Tenneville Sports
110	Un.R.St-Louis-Saint-Léger	2–0	JS.Habaysienne
111	ES.Vaux	3–1	ESC.Poupehan
112	R.Jeunesse Freylangeoise	0–2	R.U.Wallonne Ciney

=== Round 2 ===
The matches were played on 31 July and 1 August 2010.

Tie no	Home team	Score	Away team
113	K.FC.Sparta Petegem	3–0	K.FC.Varsenare
114	K.BS.Poperinge	5–0	K.Excelsior Zedelgem
115	K.VK.Ieper	5–2	Sporting W.I.Harelbeke
116	KSK Maldegem	2–2 (p 4–2)	SK.Eernegem
117	R.RC.Peruwelz	1–0	K.Sassport Boezinge
118	K.SV.Diksmuide	3–0	K.SC.Menen
119	VG.Oostende	2–4	K.Sint-Eloois-Winkel
120	K.Racing Club Bambrugge	3–0	Verbroedering Meldert
121	K.SV.Sottegem	3–2	SK.Terjoden-Welle
122	K.FC.Eendr.Zele	2–0	K.FC.Herleving Sinaai
123	R.RC.Gent-Zeehaven	2–1	K.FC.Merelbeke
124	SK.Berlare	2–0	KFC.Vrasene
125	K.FC.Sp.St-Gillis Waas	1–3	K.E.Appelterre-Eichem
126	K.Olympia SC.Wijgmaal	1–0	K.Wolvertem SC.
127	K.Londerzeel SK.	3–4	R.Léopold Uccle FC.
128	Dilbeek Sport	2–0	FC.Rillaar Sport
129	FC.Baal	0–4	Tempo Overijse
130	K.FC.Wambeek	3–0	KFC.Rhodienne-De Hoek
131	SK.St.P.Opwijk	1–0	Sport Averbode
132	K.FC.Jong VL.Kruibeke	0–3	KFC.Oosterzonen Oosterw.
133	K.FC.Duffel	0–1	K.FC.De Kempen T.L.
134	K.Sint-Job FC.	2–0	K.Wijnegem VC.
135	K.FC.Zwarte Leeuw	0–0 (p 1–3)	K.RC.Mechelen
136	K.FC.Lille	3–0	VC.Herentals
137	K.FC.St.-Lenaarts	0–1	K.Berchem Sport 2004
138	K.Lyra TSV.	2–2 (p 9–8)	K.FC.Katelijne-Waver
139	SC.Zichen-Zussen-Bolder	2–2 (p 4–5)	K.FC.Mol
140	K.Patro Eisden Maasmech.	0–1	VV.Thes Sport Tessenderlo

Tie no	Home team	Score	Away team
141	K.Vlijtingen VV.	0–1	K.Witgoor Sport Dessel
142	K.VV.Weerstand Koersel	5–4	K.SK.Bree
143	K.Sportclub Tongeren	3–2	K.Overpeltse VV.
144	K.Lutlommel VV.	2–0	Exc.Veldwezelt
145	K.ESK.Leopoldsburg	0–1	SK.Moelingen
146	Waltwilder V.V.	0–3	K.Herk-De-Stad FC.
147	R.FC.Bioul 81	3–2	JS.Taminoise
148	R.ES.Couvin-Mariembourg	3–1	Club Olympic Trivières
149	R.Geants Athois	1–1 (p 4–3)	R.Stade Brainois
150	CS.Entité Manageoise	1–3	Pont-A Celles-Buzet
151	Bracquegnies Sp.	1–3	FC.Saint-Vaast
152	St.Ghisl.-Tertre-Hautrage	5–2	Dour CS.Onhaye
153	F.Couillet-La Louvière	7–0	Royal Baileux Sport
154	R.W.Walhain CG.	1–1 (p 2–4)	R.Ent.Blegnytoise
155	R.FC.Tilleur St.-Gilles	3–3 (p 4–2)	RFC.Turkania Faymonville
156	R.Jeun.Aischoise	3–6	ET.Elsautoise
157	Football Club Cheratte	0–8	RJS.Bas-Oha
158	AC.Hombourg	0–1	R.S.C. Beaufays
159	R.FC.Meux	3–2	R.FC.Hannutois
160	R.FC. 1912 Raeren	2–2 (p 4–2)	R.FC.Vyle-Tharoul
161	R.Sprimont Comblain Sport	1–1 (p 4–2)	R.Aywaille FC.
162	R.FC.Grand-Leez	1–1 (p 5–4)	R.FC.Sérésien
163	FC.Montleban	2–3	R.U.Wallonne Ciney
164	Un.R.St-Louis-Saint-Léger	3–1	FC.Jeun.Lorr.Arlonaise
165	R.OC.Meix-Dt-Virton	0–1	R.Standard FC.Bièvre
166	R.US.Givry	5–1	R.LC.Bastogne
167	FC.Jeun.Lorr.Arlonaise	3–0	ES.Vaux
168	R.CS.Condruzien	1–3	R.All.FC.Oppagne-Wéris

=== Round 3 ===
The matches were played on 7 and 8 August 2010.

Tie no	Home team	Score	Away team
169	FC.Bleid-Gaume	2–2 (p 5–4)	R.FC. 1912 Raeren
170	R.Ent.Bertrigeoise	3–3 (p 9–8)	R.RC.Gent-Zeehaven
171	K.Olsa Brakel	2–2 (p 11–10)	SK.Berlare
172	K.S.K. Ronse	3–0	Un.R.St-Louis-Saint-Léger
173	K.V. Woluwe-Zaventem	5–2	VV.Thes Sport Tessenderlo
174	K.Witgoor Sport Dessel	0–0 (p 3–5)	K.FC.Izegem
175	K.S.V. Temse	0–2	K.Berchem Sport 2004
176	K.RC.Mechelen	3–0	R.F.C. de Liège
177	Heppig.-Lambusart-Fleurus	3–0	FC.Saint-Vaast
178	Dilbeek Sport	0–3	R.O.C. de Charleroi-Marchienne
179	K. Diegem Sport	0–1	K.FC.Eendr.Zele
180	K.Racing Club Bambrugge	0–2	K. Racing Waregem
181	R.U.Wallonne Ciney	4–2	K.SV.Sottegem
182	Pont-A Celles-Buzet	0–0 (p 6–7)	K.F.C. Dessel Sport
183	R.All.FC.Oppagne-Wéris	6–0	R.Union St.-Gilloise
184	K.V.V. Koksijde	5–0	K.SV.Diksmuide
185	K.BS.Poperinge	1–4	U.R.S. du Centre
186	R.Sprimont Comblain Sport	2–2 (p 1–3)	K.FC.Sparta Petegem
187	KSK Maldegem	1–2	K.Bocholter VV.
188	K.FC.Mol	0–2	R.Standard FC.Bièvre
189	R.ES.Couvin-Mariembourg	2–3	Sportkring Sint-Niklaas
190	R.FC.Bioul 81	3–3 (p 5–3)	S.C. Wielsbeke
191	F.Couillet-La Louvière	0–0 (p 3–5)	K.FC.Lille

Tie no	Home team	Score	Away team
192	R.FC.Meux	3–1	FC.Jeun.Lorr.Arlonaise
193	K.M.S.K. Deinze	0–1	R.Léopold Uccle FC.
194	R.FC.Grand-Leez	2–3	K.Olympia SC.Wijgmaal
195	K.Sint-Job FC.	0–2	White Star Woluwe F.C.
196	Union Royale Namur	3–0	K.Sint-Eloois-Winkel
197	K.Lutlommel VV.	1–1 (p 4–2)	K.F.C. V.W. Hamme
198	K.E.Appelterre-Eichem	1–3	K.SK.L.Ternat
199	R.Ent.Blegnytoise	0–1	K.S.C. Grimbergen
200	R.E. Virton	3–0	K.Sportclub Tongeren
201	K.S.C. Hasselt	1–2	R.US.Givry
202	St.Ghisl.-Tertre-Hautrage	0–1	Hoogstraten V.V.
203	V.C. Eendracht Aalst 2002	7–0	SK.Moelingen
204	R.RC.Peruwelz	0–0 (p 4–3)	Verbr.Geel-Meerhout
205	K.VK.Ieper	1–1 (p 3–4)	R.S.C. Beaufays
206	KFC.Oosterzonen Oosterw.	1–2	R. Cappellen F.C.
207	K.Herk-De-Stad FC.	3–4	K.Lyra TSV.
208	R.FC.Tilleur St.-Gilles	2–2 (p 3–4)	R.Geants Athois
209	K.FC.De Kempen T.L.	3–3 (p 3–0)	K.S.V. Oudenaarde
210	R.F.C. Huy	4–1	Tempo Overijse
211	K.S.V. Bornem	3–0	SK.St.P.Opwijk
212	R.C.S. Verviétois	1–1 (p 5–4)	RJS.Bas-Oha
213	K.FC.Wambeek	1–5	Torhout 1992 KM
214	ET.Elsautoise	3–0	K.VV.Weerstand Koersel

=== Round 4 ===
The matches were played during the weekend of 14 and 15 August 2010.

Team 1	Score	Team 2
Sportkring Sint-Niklaas	1–2	K.S.K. Heist
R.Ent.Bertrigeoise	1–2	K.S.C. Grimbergen
K.V. Woluwe-Zaventem	3–4 (a.e.t.)	V.C. Eendracht Aalst 2002
Oud-Heverlee Leuven	7–0 ^{1}	R.S.C. Beaufays
K.FC.Lille	2–1	F.C. Verbroedering Dender E.H.
K.FC.De Kempen T.L.	1–1 (a.e.t) (p 3–1)	FC Brussels
K.Olsa Brakel	4–2	Torhout 1992 KM
R.F.C. Huy	1–2 (a.e.t.)	K. Standaard Wetteren
Heppig.-Lambusart-Fleurus	6–1	FC.Bleid-Gaume
R.Léopold Uccle FC.	2–4	K.S.K. Ronse
Boussu Dour Borinage	1–2 (a.e.t.)	K.FC.Sparta Petegem
R.O.C. de Charleroi-Marchienne	2–4	K.V. Red Star Waasland-Beveren
K.V. Turnhout	3–0	K.Bocholter VV.
K.RC.Mechelen	2–1	Union Royale Namur
K. Rupel Boom F.C.	2–1	K.FC.Izegem
K.V.V. Koksijde	3–0	K.FC.Eendr.Zele
White Star Woluwe F.C.	2–0	R.Standard FC.Bièvre
K.Berchem Sport 2004	2–2 (a.e.t.) (p 2–5)	U.R.S. du Centre
ET.Elsautoise	2–4	K. Racing Waregem
K.S.V. Bornem	0–1	C.S. Visé
R.C.S. Verviétois	1–2 (a.e.t.)	R.F.C. Tournai
K.Lutlommel VV.	1–1 (a.e.t.) (p 4–2)	R.Geants Athois
K.F.C. Dessel Sport	0–0 (a.e.t.) (p 3–4)	K.S.V. Roeselare
R.U.Wallonne Ciney	0–3	R.A.E.C. Mons
A.F.C. Tubize	1–2	R.RC.Peruwelz
K.SK.L.Ternat	1–1 (a.e.t.) (p 4–5)	R. Cappellen F.C.
R.All.FC.Oppagne-Wéris	0–3	R.E. Virton
K.Olympia SC.Wijgmaal	0–1	K.Lyra TSV.
K.V.K. Tienen	7–1	R.FC.Bioul 81
K.V. Oostende	1–3	Hoogstraten V.V.
Royal Antwerp FC	2–1	R.US.Givry
K.V.S.K. United Overpelt-Lommel	6–0	R.FC.Meux

Note

- Note 1: Order of legs reversed after original draw.

=== Round 5 ===
The matches were played on 22 August 2010.

Team 1	Score	Team 2
R. Cappellen F.C.	0–2	K.V. Turnhout
K.V.S.K. United Overpelt-Lommel	3–0	Heppig.-Lambusart-Fleurus
K.V. Red Star Waasland-Beveren	4–2	K.S.K. Heist
R.F.C. Tournai	2–2 (a.e.t) (p 4–3)	Oud-Heverlee Leuven
K.Olsa Brakel	1–3	K. Racing Waregem
C.S. Visé	0–3	R.E. Virton
K.Lutlommel VV.	2–3	Royal Antwerp FC
K. Standaard Wetteren	2–1	Hoogstraten V.V.
K. Rupel Boom F.C.	1–0	K.S.C. Grimbergen
K.R.C. Mechelen	1–3	K.V.V. Koksijde
U.R.S. du Centre	1–0	K.F.C. Sparta Petegem
White Star Woluwe F.C.	4–0	K.FC.De Kempen T.L.
R.A.E.C. Mons	1–3 (a.e.t)	K.S.V. Roeselare
K.V.K. Tienen	3–1	K. Lyra T.S.V.
V.C. Eendracht Aalst 2002	2–0	K.S.K. Ronse
R.R.C. Peruwelz	3–3 (a.e.t) (p 2–5)	K.F.C. Lille

== Final Stages ==
=== Bracket ===
Round 6
Westerlo	2
Roeselare	0
Centre	2 (1)
Anderlecht (p)	2 (4)
Lierse	4
Rupel Boom	0
Tournai	2
Sint-Truidense	1
Lille	0
Cercle Brugge	4
Charleroi	1
Waasland-Beveren	2
Germinal Beerschot	3
Eendracht Aalst 2002	0
Club Brugge	3
Lommel United	1
White Star Woluwe	2
Zulte Waregem	1
Standaard Wetteren	2
Lokeren (aet)	4
Gent	4
Tienen	1
Eupen	2
Turnhout	1
Standard Liège	2
Antwerp	1
Genk	3
Koksijde	0
Kortrijk (aet)	2
Virton	1
Mechelen	7
Racing Waregem	0

Round 7
Westerlo	1
Anderlecht	0
Lierse	4
Tournai	1
Cercle Brugge	3
Waasland-Beveren	1
Germinal Beerschot	2
Club Brugge	1
White Star Woluwe	1
Lokeren	0
Gent	3
Eupen	1
Standard Liège	2
Genk	1
Kortrijk	1
Mechelen	2

Quarter-finals
Westerlo (a)	1	3	4
Lierse	2	2	4
Cercle Brugge	2	1	3
Germinal Beerschot	0	1	1
White Star Woluwe	0	0	0
Gent	2	1	3
Standard Liège	2	4	6
Mechelen	0	1	1

Semi-finals
Westerlo (a)	0	3	3
Cercle Brugge	0	3	3
Gent	1	2	3
Standard Liège	0	4	4

Final
Westerlo	0
Standard Liège	2

=== Round 6 ===
These matches took place on 26–27 October 2010.

26 October 2010	Charleroi	1–2	Waasland-Beveren (II)	Charleroi
20:30 CET	Cordaro 9'		Snelders 71'; Veldeman 88'	Stadium: Stade du Pays de Charleroi

26 October 2010	Kortrijk	2–1 (a.e.t.)	Virton (III)	Kortrijk
20:30 CET	Belhocine 89'; Rossini 98'		Molnar 59'	Stadium: Guldensporen Stadion

27 October 2010	Gent	4–1	Tienen (II)	Ghent
19:30 CET	Smolders 22' (pen.), 68'; De Smet 45+2'; Soumahoro 84'		Coulibaly 62' (o.g.)	Stadium: Jules Ottenstadion

27 October 2010	Lille (IV)	0–4	Cercle Brugge	Lille
20:00 CET			Van Eenoo 9', 57'; D'haene 32'; Reynaldo 79'	Stadium: Sportcentrum Balsakker

27 October 2010	Genk	3–0	Koksijde (III)	Genk
20:00 CET	Barda 41', 76'; Ogunjimi 80'			Stadium: Cristal Arena

27 October 2010	Mechelen	7–0	Racing Waregem (III)	Mechelen
20:30 CET	de Storme 29'; Mununga 36'; Gorius 45', 76'; Vidarsson 51'; Benteke 74' van Hoevelen 88'			Stadium: Argosstadion Achter de Kazerne

27 October 2010	Eupen	2–1	Turnhout (II)	Eupen
20:30 CET	Obradović 43'; Jefferson 78'		Ven 81' (pen.)	Stadium: Kehrweg Stadion

27 October 2010	Westerlo	2–0	Roeselare (II)	Westerlo
20:30 CET	Mravac 55'; Dekelver 76'			Stadium: Het Kuipje

27 October 2010	Standaard Wetteren (II)	2–4 (a.e.t.)	Lokeren	Wetteren
20:30 CET	De Langhe 8', 73'		Deekman 20'; De Ceulaer 69'; Persoons 112' (pen.); De Pauw 119'	Stadium: Marcel De Kerpelstadion

27 October 2010	Standard Liège	2–1	Royal Antwerp (II)	Liège
20:30 CET	Opare 44'; Nong 57'		De Vriese 21'	Stadium: Stade Maurice Dufrasne

27 October 2010	Tournai (II)	2–1	Sint-Truidense	Tournai
20:30 CET	Duquesnoy 10'; Olungu Lomani 52'		Bertjens 90+4'	Stadium: Stade Luc Varenne

27 October 2010	Germinal Beerschot	3–0	Eendracht Aalst 2002 (III)	Antwerp
20:30 CET	Goor 15'; De Castro 36' (o.g.); Haroun 63'			Stadium: Olympisch Stadion

27 October 2010	White Star Woluwe (III)	2–1	Zulte Waregem	Woluwe-Saint-Lambert
20:30 CET	Dessaer 4'; Miceli 59'		Vandiepenbeeck 7' (o.g.)	Stadium: Stade Communal Fallon

27 October 2010	Lierse	4–0	Rupel Boom (II)	Lier
20:30 CET	Radzinski 25'; Sonck 30', 33'; Nicaise 58'			Stadium: Herman Vanderpoortenstadion

27 October 2010	Club Brugge	3–1	Lommel United (II)	Bruges
20:30 CET	Vargas 4'; Kouemaha 26'; Blondel 69'		Dufour 51'	Stadium: Jan Breydel Stadium

27 October 2010	U.R.S. du Centre (III)	2–2 (a.e.t.) (1–4 p)	Anderlecht	La Louviere
20:45 CET	Delaby 14', 45+1'		Chavarría 25'; Gillet 50'	Stadium: Stade du Tivoli
	Penalties
	Stilmant (penalty missed); Nicaise (penalty scored); Le Part (penalty missed)		Kljestan (penalty scored); Kanu (penalty scored); Bernárdez (penalty scored); Lukaku (penalty scored)

=== Round 7 ===
These matches took place in November 2010.

9 November 2010	Standard Liège	2–1	Genk	Liège
20:45 CET	Witsel 19' (pen.); Tchité 58'		Leye 36' (o.g.)	Stadium: Stade Maurice Dufrasne

10 November 2010	Gent	3–1	Eupen	Ghent
20:00 CET	Arbeitman 45+2', 59'; Ljubijankič 84'		Mombongo 61'	Stadium: Jules Ottenstadion

10 November 2010	Kortrijk	1–2	Mechelen	Kortrijk
20:30 CET	Rossini 85'		Pandža 74'; Geudens 77'	Stadium: Guldensporen Stadion

10 November 2010	Westerlo	1–0	Anderlecht	Westerlo
20:30 CET	Henrique 47'			Stadium: Het Kuipje

10 November 2010	Lierse	4–1	Tournai (II)	Lier
20:30 CET	Radzinski 19'; El-Gabbas 32', 74'; Kovács 64'		Duquesnoy 88'	Stadium: Herman Vanderpoortenstadion

10 November 2010	Germinal Beerschot	2–1	Club Brugge	Antwerp
20:30 CET	Negrão 90+1' (pen.); Čustović 90+3'		Kouemaha 42'	Stadium: Olympisch Stadion

10 November 2010	Cercle Brugge	3–1	Waasland-Beveren (II)	Bruges
20:30 CET	Cornelis 21', 66' (pen.); Reynaldo 50'		Gommans 89'	Stadium: Jan Breydel Stadium

10 November 2010	White Star Woluwe (III)	1–0	Lokeren	Woluwe-Saint-Lambert
20:40 CET	Dessaer 42'			Stadium: Stade Communal Fallon

=== Quarter-finals ===
The draw for the quarter- and semifinals took place on November 24, 2010. The matches will be played over two legs.

==== First legs ====
26 January 2011	Westerlo	1–2	Lierse	Westerlo
20:30 CET	Dekelver 44'		De Wree 2'; Radzinski 83'	Stadium: Het Kuipje; Referee: Luc Wouters

26 January 2011	White Star Woluwe (III)	0–2	Gent	Woluwe-Saint-Lambert
20:30 CET			Thijs 64'; Bryssinck 90+1' (o.g.)	Stadium: Stade Communal Fallon

26 January 2011	Cercle Brugge	2–0	Germinal Beerschot	Bruges
20:30 CET	Wang 5'; Cornelis 45'			Stadium: Jan Breydel Stadium

26 January 2011	Standard Liège	2–0	Mechelen	Liège
20:35 CET	Tchité 24'; Daerden 53'			Stadium: Stade Maurice Dufrasne

==== Second legs ====
2 March 2011	Gent	1–0 (3–0 agg.)	White Star Woluwe (III)	Ghent
20:30 CET	Conte 28'			Stadium: Jules Ottenstadion

2 March 2011	Germinal Beerschot	1–1 (1–3 agg.)	Cercle Brugge	Antwerp
20:30 CET	Cruz 66'		Owusu 67'	Stadium: Olympisch Stadion

2 March 2011	Mechelen	1–4 (1–6 agg.)	Standard Liège	Mechelen
20:30 CET	Gorius 70' (pen.)		Leye 48', 72'; Tchité 64'; Witsel 68'	Stadium: Argosstadion Achter de Kazerne

2 March 2011	Lierse	2–3 (4–4a agg.)	Westerlo	Lier
20:45 CET	Sonck 28'; Cavens 82'		De Petter 32'; Henrique 60'; Dekelver 69'	Stadium: Herman Vanderpoortenstadion

=== Semi-finals ===
The semi finals will also be two-legged.

==== First legs ====
16 March 2011	Westerlo	0–0	Cercle Brugge	Westerlo
				Stadium: Het Kuipje

16 March 2011	Gent	1–0	Standard Liège	Ghent
	El Ghanassy 29'			Stadium: Jules Ottenstadion

==== Second legs ====
6 April 2011	Cercle Brugge	3–3 (3–3a agg.)	Westerlo	Bruges
	Neto 24'; D'Haene 49'; Foley 80'		Henrique 45+1', 61'; Ngolok 58'	Stadium: Jan Breydel Stadium

6 April 2011	Standard Liège	4–2 (4–3 agg.)	Gent	Liège
	Van Damme 19'; Tchité 33', 74'; Carcela 69'		Coulibaly 20'; Mboyo 82'	Stadium: Stade Maurice Dufrasne

=== Final ===
21 May 2011
20:30 CET

Westerlo	0–2	Standard Liège
		Mangala 34'; Mravac 61' (o.g.)

King Baudouin Stadium, Brussels
Referee: Frank De Bleeckere

== See also ==
- 2010–11 Belgian First Division
