= Mehdi Carcela =

Footballer (born 1989)

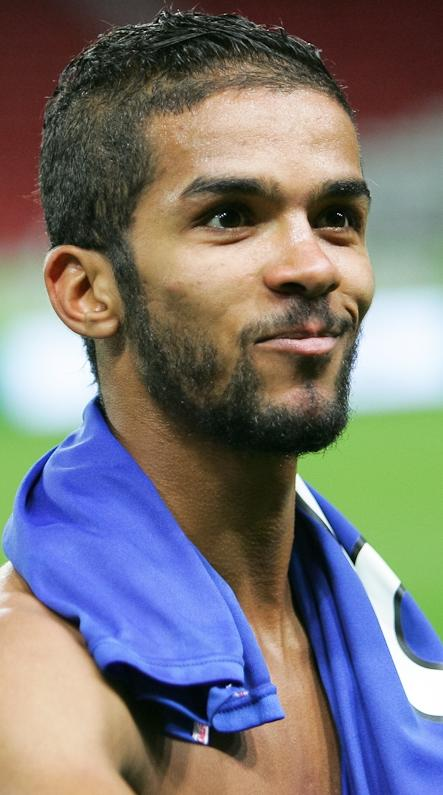
- Carcela with Anzhi Makhachkala in 2012

Personal information
- Full name: Mehdi François Carcela-González
- Date of birth: 1 July 1989 (age 37)
- Place of birth: Liège, Belgium
- Height: 1.76 m (5 ft 9 in)
- Position: Midfielder

Youth career
- 1994–2008: Standard Liège

Senior career*
Years	Team	Apps	(Gls)
2008–2011	Standard Liège	83	(18)
2011–2013	Anzhi Makhachkala	31	(1)
2013–2015	Standard Liège	45	(6)
2015–2016	Benfica	20	(2)
2016–2018	Granada	22	(5)
2017–2018	→ Olympiacos (loan)	6	(0)
2018	→ Standard Liège (loan)	6	(2)
2018–2022	Standard Liège	100	(9)

International career^{‡}
2004	Belgium U16	2	(0)
2005–2006	Belgium U17	11	(2)
2006–2007	Belgium U18	12	(1)
2009–2010	Belgium U21	8	(1)
2009–2010	Belgium	2	(0)
2011–2019	Morocco	22	(1)
- * Club domestic league appearances and goals as of 10 April 2022 ‡ National team caps and goals as of 21:00, 15 October 2019 (UTC)

Mehdi François Carcela-González (Arabic: المهدي كارسيلا; born 1 July 1989) is a former professional footballer who plays as a midfielder.

He began his career in his hometown club Standard Liège, playing 157 games and scoring 25 goals in two spells from 2008 to 2015. He won the league in 2009 and the cup two years later. In between his two stints, he played for Anzhi Makhachkala in Russia, joining for a fee of €5.7 million. In 2015, he signed with Benfica in Portugal, and a year later with Granada in Spain.

Carcela represented Belgium at all youth levels and played twice for its senior team before changing his allegiance to his ancestral Morocco in 2010. He represented the latter country at the 2012 and 2017 Africa Cup of Nations.

== Club career ==
=== Standard Liège ===
Carcela is a product of the Standard Liège academy, having joined the club at age five. He made his professional debut at nineteen, when he came on as a substitute for Igor de Camargo in the 81st minute. Standard won 2–0 against Kortrijk on 13 September 2008. He later made his European debut in the last game of the group stage of the UEFA Cup against Stuttgart on 18 December 2008, coming on as a substitute for Wilfried Dalmat in the 65th minute of a 3–0 away defeat. In his first season, the club won the league and Belgian Super Cup, with him making only twelve appearances.

Carcela began the 2009–10 season as a substitute, as Standard won the Belgian Super Cup for the second time running. He then scored his first goal for the club and made an assist, in a 5–1 win over Roeselare on 15 August. Four weeks later, on 13 September, he scored twice, as the team beat Mechelen 3–0. He then scored in the next match six days later, in a 3–1 win over Lokeren. On 24 November he was sent off in the Champions League group match at Arsenal after he head-butted Cesc Fàbregas in the waning moments of the 2–0 defeat at Emirates Stadium. As a result, Carcela missed two matches in the next European games. This season proved a breakthrough season for Carcela, as he scored five goals in 44 appearances in all competitions.

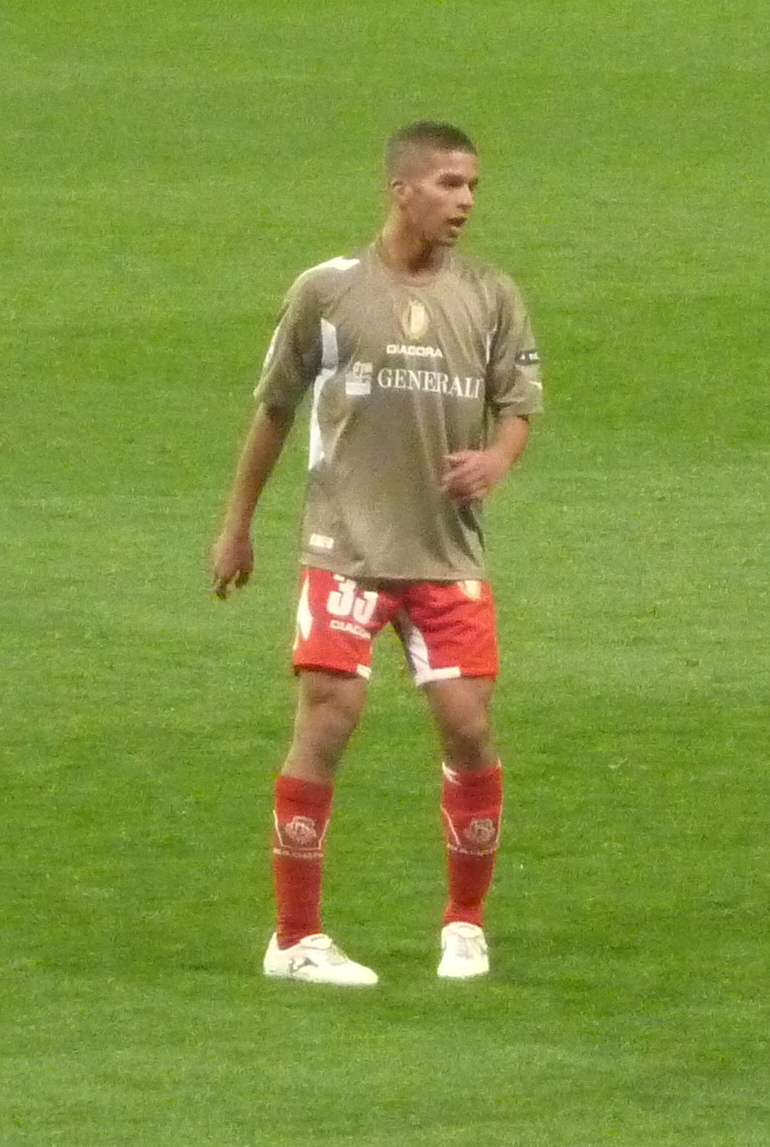
Carcela with Standard Liège in 2009

In the 2010–11 season, Carcela's performances were observed by Zinedine Zidane from Real Madrid. He made an impressive start to the season when he scored four goals in two games against Lierse on 6 August and Lokoren eight days later. He then scored three goals in three matches between game weeks 10 and 12, as he helped the club humiliate Anderlecht in a 5–1 win; then scored another in a loss against Genk on 17 October; and a 2–1 win against Gent a week later. At the end of 2010, Carcela was listed among the 100 best young players in the world by Don Balón.

On 17 May 2011, he was on the receiving end of a kick in the face from Chris Mavinga while both players were tussling for the ball in a league match against Genk, which left him with several facial fractures and broken teeth. After the match, Mavinga apologised to Carcela for his actions. Meanwhile, that season, Carcela would help the club progress in the Belgian Cup by scoring in the second leg of the semi-final, as Standard Liège beat Gent 4–1 to reach the final. Carcela had surgery to treat the injury he sustained from Mavinga. He described the incident as the "most difficult period of his life" because he feared that he could have died. As a result of having surgery, He missed the final of the Belgian Cup, in which his team won 2–0 against Westerlo. By the end of the season, Carcela had made 44 appearances in all competitions and scoring 14 times, making him the club's top scorer of the 2010–11 season.

=== Anzhi Makhachkala ===
In September 2011, Carcela moved to Russia by joining Anzhi Makhachkala for €5.7 million, where he signed a four-year contract. Upon joining the club, he revealed that Spartak Moscow offered a wage double what Anzhi offered. However, Spartak Moscow's sporting director, Dmitri Popov, denied the claim, suggesting he joined Anzhi because of his religion. Makhachkala, capital of the Republic of Dagestan, has a large Muslim population and Carcela joined with his compatriot teammate Mbark Boussoufa.

In his first season, Carcela made only eight appearances, because of his injury concerns and his upcoming commitments in the African Cup of Nations. At one point, Carcela played in the centre forward position on 1 April 2012, in a 1–0 loss against Rubin Kazan.

In his first full season, Carcela saw his future at the club in doubt and considered leaving the club if he did not get enough playing time, and the club management considered selling him. As a result, he was suspected to be moving to Udinese Despite this situation, he scored his first goal for the club, in a 1–0 win over Amkar Perm on 5 August 2012. In the UEFA Europa League play-off round, Carcela-González scored again, as Anzhi thrashed AZ 5–0, beating them 6–0 on aggregate. From there, Carcela had an extended run in the first team that he considered a step forward in his career.

In August 2013, following restructuring at business level, Anzhi chose to transfer list its whole squad, including Carcela. Following this, he expressed a desire to leave the club, and was rumored to be moving back to Standard, or to Roma, Marseille, Toulouse or Nice.

=== Return to Standard Liège ===
After two years in Russia, Carcela returned to Standard Liège on a three-year contract for an undisclosed fee.

On 8 December 2013, after Oud-Heverlee Leuven's Bjorn Ruytinx committed a bad foul on Carcela and then appeared to be laughing, Carcela got up, punched him in the face, and was sent off. He received a four-match suspension. He scored in a 1–0 against Charleroi on 15 February 2014. Carcela then scored his second goal of the season, in a 1–0 win over Anderlecht on 30 March 2014. In the last game of the season, he scored for the third time of the season, in a 1–0 win over Gent, but Anderlecht's victory gave them instead of Standard the title.

=== Benfica ===
On 13 June 2015, Carcela signed a four-year deal with Portuguese champions Benfica. He debuted for the team on 23 August in a 1–0 away loss at Arouca in the Primeira Liga, and scored his first goal for Benfica on 16 October in a 2–1 away win at Vianense in the Taça de Portugal. Two weeks later, he scored his first goal in the Primeira Liga, in a 4–0 league win at Tondela. He was mostly used as a substitute as the Reds retained their title, and played four matches in their victorious Taça da Liga campaign but was an unused substitute in the final.

=== Granada ===
On 31 August 2016, Carcela-González signed a four-year contract with Spanish club Granada. He made his La Liga debut on 11 September as a 65th-minute substitute for Omer Atzili in a 2–1 home loss to Eibar, and five days later he scored his first goal, opening a 2–2 draw at fellow Andalusians Real Betis. Carcela finished with 24 games and five goals across all competitions while his team were relegated in last place.

=== Olympiacos ===
On 7 July 2017, Olympiacos officially announced the signing of Carcela on a three-year deal. He was officially set for release from the club on 4 December 2017 as his performances and work rate did not live up to the expectations of the Olympiacos management, but was reinstated to first-team training sessions on 18 January 2018 under the reign of Oscar Garcia.

=== Return to Standard Liège ===
On the last day of the January transfer window, Carcela returned for third time in his career to Standard Liège. Carcela was out of the plans of former coach Takis Lemonis, however received a second chance when Oscar Garcia was appointed. Despite returning to the club's practices in recent weeks, Olympiakos decided to let the player go. His former teammate Silvio Proto attributed Carcela's below-par performances for Thrylos to him being unsettled at the club.

On 17 March 2018, he played as Standard Liège beat Genk 1–0 in extra time to win the 2018 Belgian Cup Final and qualify for the UEFA Europa League.

== International career ==
Carcela initially chose to represent his country of birth, Belgium, and even played two friendlies with the Red Devils, but in December 2010 he changed his mind and decided to represent Morocco.

In February 2011, Carcela made his debut with the Atlas Lions of Morocco against Niger in a 3–0 win for his new side, coming on as a late substitute and winning a penalty. After making his debut, he spoke out on his decision to play for Morocco, saying that he is proud to represent the national team and that it felt "like a childhood dream".

Carcela made the squad for the 2012 Africa Cup of Nations, playing two matches in a group stage exit.

On 11 October 2016, Carcela scored his first goal for Morocco in a 4–0 friendly victory against Canada at the Stade de Marrakech.

Manager Hervé Renard named Carcela in his squad for the 2017 Africa Cup of Nations in Gabon. He played one match, the opening 1–0 loss to the DR Congo, in a quarter-final finish.

In May 2018 he was named in Morocco's 23-man squad for the 2018 FIFA World Cup in Russia.

== Personal life ==
Carcela was born in Liège, Belgium, to a Spanish father and Moroccan mother. He remains in touch with his hometown. His cousin Joachim Carcela is also a professional footballer.

== Career statistics ==
=== Club ===
As of 22 October 2020

Appearances and goals by club, season and competition
Club	Season	League			National cup (Note: Includes Belgian Cup, Russian Cup, Taça de Portugal, Copa del Rey, Greek Football Cup)		League cup (Note: Includes Taça da Liga)		Europe		Other		Total	
Club	Season	Division	Apps	Goals	Apps	Goals	Apps	Goals	Apps	Goals	Apps	Goals	Apps	Goals
Standard Liège	2008–09	Belgian First Division	13	0	0	0	–		2 (Note: Appearances in UEFA Cup)	0	–		15	0
Standard Liège	2009–10	Belgian Pro League	32	5	2	0	–		10 (Note: Five appearances in UEFA Champions League, five appearances in UEFA Europa League)	0	1 (Note: Appearance in Belgian Super Cup)	0	45	5
Standard Liège	2010–11	Belgian Pro League	38	13	6	1	–		–		–		44	14
Standard Liège	Total		83	18	8	1	–		12	0	1	0	104	19
Anzhi	2011–12	Russian Premier League	8	0	0	0	–		0	0	–		8	0
Anzhi	2012–13	Russian Premier League	20	1	2	0	–		14 (Note: Appearances in UEFA Europa League)	1	–		36	2
Anzhi	2013–14	Russian Premier League	3	0	0	0	–		–		–		3	0
Anzhi	Total		31	1	2	0	–		14	1	–		47	2
Standard Liège	2013–14	Belgian Pro League	25	3	2	0	–		3	0	–		30	3
Standard Liège	2014–15	Belgian Pro League	20	3	0	0	–		3 (Note: Two appearances in UEFA Champions League, one appearance in UEFA Europa League)	0	–		23	3
Standard Liège	Total		45	6	2	0	–		6	0	–		53	6
Benfica	2015–16	Primeira Liga	20	2	1	1	4	0	4 (Note: Appearances in UEFA Champions League)	0	0	0	29	3
Granada	2016–17	La Liga	22	5	2	0	—		—		—		24	5
Olympiacos	2017–18	Super League Greece	6	0	2	0	—		8	1	—		16	1
Standard Liège	2017–18	Belgian Pro League	16	5	2	0	—		—		—		18	5
Standard Liège	2018–19	Belgian Pro League	37	5	0	0	—		8 (Note: Two appearances and one goal in UEFA Champions League, six appearances and one goal in UEFA Europa League)	2	1	0	46	7
Standard Liège	2019–20	Belgian Pro League	26	3	2	0	—		6	0	—		34	3
Standard Liège	2020–21	Belgian Pro League	4	0	0	0	—		4	0	—		8	0
Standard Liège	Total		83	13	4	0	0	0	18	2	1	0	106	15
Career total			290	45	21	2	4	0	62	4	2	0	379	51

=== International ===
Appearances and goals by national team and year
National team	Year	Apps	Goals
Belgium	2009	1	0
Belgium	2010	1	0
Total		2	0
Morocco	2011	3	0
Morocco	2012	4	0
Morocco	2014	3	0
Morocco	2016	4	1
Morocco	2017	5	0
Morocco	2018	3	0
Total		22	1

Scores and results list Morocco's goal tally first, score column indicates score after each Carcela goal.

List of international goals scored by Mehdi Carcela'
No.	Date	Venue	Opponent	Score	Result	Competition
1	11 October 2016	Stade de Marrakech, Marrakesh, Morocco	Canada	1–0	4–0	Friendly

== Honours ==
Standard Liège

- Belgian Pro League: 2008–09
- Belgian Cup: 2010–11, 2017–18
- Belgian Super Cup: 2009

Anzhi Makhachkala

- Russian Cup runner-up: 2012–13

Benfica

- Primeira Liga: 2015–16
- Taça da Liga: 2015–16

Individual

- Belgian Lion Award: 2015, 2018, 2019
