= Eliaquim Mangala =

French footballer (born 1991)

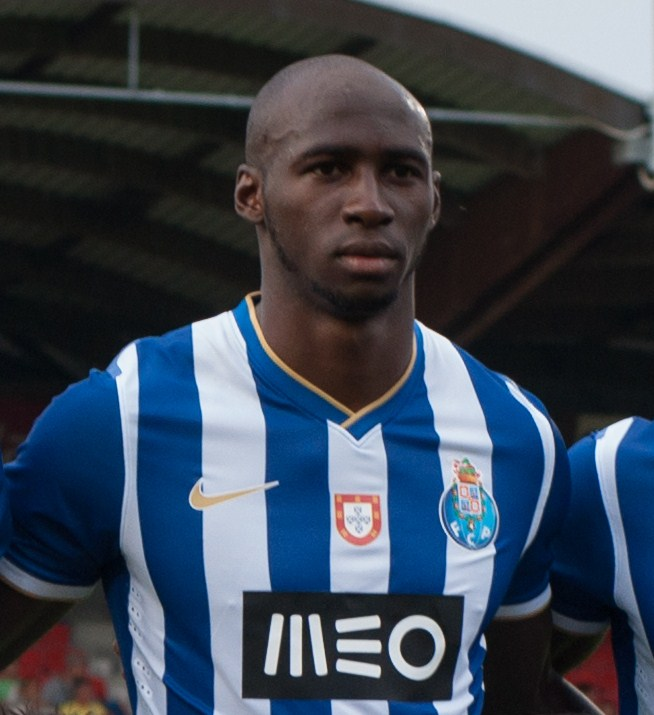
- Mangala lining up for Porto in 2013

Personal information
- Full name: Eliaquim Hans Mangala
- Date of birth: 13 February 1991 (age 35)
- Place of birth: Colombes, Hauts-de-Seine, France
- Height: 1.88 m (6 ft 2 in)
- Position: Centre-back

Youth career
- 1996–2002: AC Lustin
- 2002–2004: CS Wépionnais
- 2004–2007: UR Namur
- 2007–2008: Standard Liège

Senior career*
Years	Team	Apps	(Gls)
2008–2011	Standard Liège	77	(2)
2011–2014	Porto	51	(6)
2014–2019	Manchester City	57	(0)
2016–2017	→ Valencia (loan)	30	(2)
2018	→ Everton (loan)	2	(0)
2019–2021	Valencia	15	(0)
2022	Saint-Étienne	14	(1)
2023–2025	Estoril	26	(1)
2026	Oriente Petrolero	5	(1)

International career
2009–2012	France U21	21	(2)
2013–2016	France	8	(0)
Medal record
Men's football
Representing France
UEFA European Championship
Runner-up	2016 France
- * Club domestic league appearances and goals as of 3 June 2025

Eliaquim Hans Mangala (born 13 February 1991) is a French former professional footballer who played as a centre-back.

Born in France, he moved to Belgium as a child and began his career there at Standard Liège, going onto Porto in 2011 where he won consecutive Primeira Liga titles before joining Manchester City in 2014 for £32 million. He played 79 matches for City, won the Premier League in 2017–18, and had loans at Valencia and Everton, before joining the former on a free transfer in 2019.

Mangala made his debut with the France national team on 6 June 2013 against Uruguay. He was included in the nation's squads for the 2014 FIFA World Cup and UEFA Euro 2016, making a substitute appearance in the latter.

== Club career ==
=== Early career ===
Mangala was born in the northwestern Parisian suburb of Colombes, Hauts-de-Seine, to Congolese parents. He acquired French nationality on 5 December 1995, through the collective effect of his mother's naturalization. He moved to Belgium at the age of five to live in the French-speaking city of Namur. At the same age, he joined local club Athletic Club Lustin as a youth player and spent six years at the club before moving to CS Wépionnais in nearby Wépion. After two years in Wépion, Mangala joined the biggest club in the city, UR Namur, and quickly impressed. While at Namur, Mangala was utilised as a striker and his positive displays at youth level led to interest from Standard Liège. In 2007, Mangala and Standard reached an agreement on a three-year youth contract.

=== Standard Liège ===
Mangala joined Standard Liège and, upon his arrival, was converted into a left back and inserted into the club's under-17 team for the 2007–08 season. Mangala's admirable play with the team led to the player being promoted to Standard's under-19 team in January 2008, where he again switched positions, this time moving into central defence. During his time with the under-19 team, Mangala made the bench several times for Standard's under-21 team, despite being only 17 years old.

For the 2008–09 season, Mangala was given the opportunity to train and play with the first team. On 23 October 2008, he signed his first professional contract, agreeing to a five-year deal with the club. Mangala was officially promoted to the senior team and assigned the number 22 shirt. On 9 November, he made his professional debut as an 89th-minute substitute in a 3–1 victory over Germinal Beerschot. He made another late appearance against Gent before earning his first career league start against Dender on 17 January 2009. In the match, Mangala provided the assist on the opening goal scored by Milan Jovanović in the 3rd minute of play. Standard won the match 3–2 with Mangala playing the entire match. He finished the season with 11 league appearances as Standard Liège were crowned champions. He also appeared in UEFA Cup matches against Italian club Sampdoria, German club Stuttgart, and Portuguese team Sporting CP, starting the match against the latter.

Mangala was inserted as a starter for the 2009–10 season making his debut in the club's 2–0 victory over Genk in the Belgian Supercup on 25 July 2009. On 12 September, Mangala scored his first professional goal in a league match against Mechelen in a 3–0 victory. Four days later, Mangala scored another goal against English club Arsenal in the club's opening UEFA Champions League group stage match. Mangala scored the goal in the 3rd minute and Standard striker Jovanović scored two minutes later to put Standard Liège up 2–0, however, the club went on to lose the match 3–2 following three unanswered goals from the English team.

In what proved to be his final league match for Standard, Mangala converted a Steven Defour free-kick to give his team a 1–0 lead over KRC Genk at half-time, but striker Kennedy Ugoala Nwanganga earned a 1–1 draw for Genk, securing the league title by just half a point over Standard. In his final appearance for the club on 21 May 2011, Mangala scored Standard's first goal in their 2–0 victory over K.V.C. Westerlo in the final of the Belgian Cup, ending an 18-year cup drought.

=== Porto ===
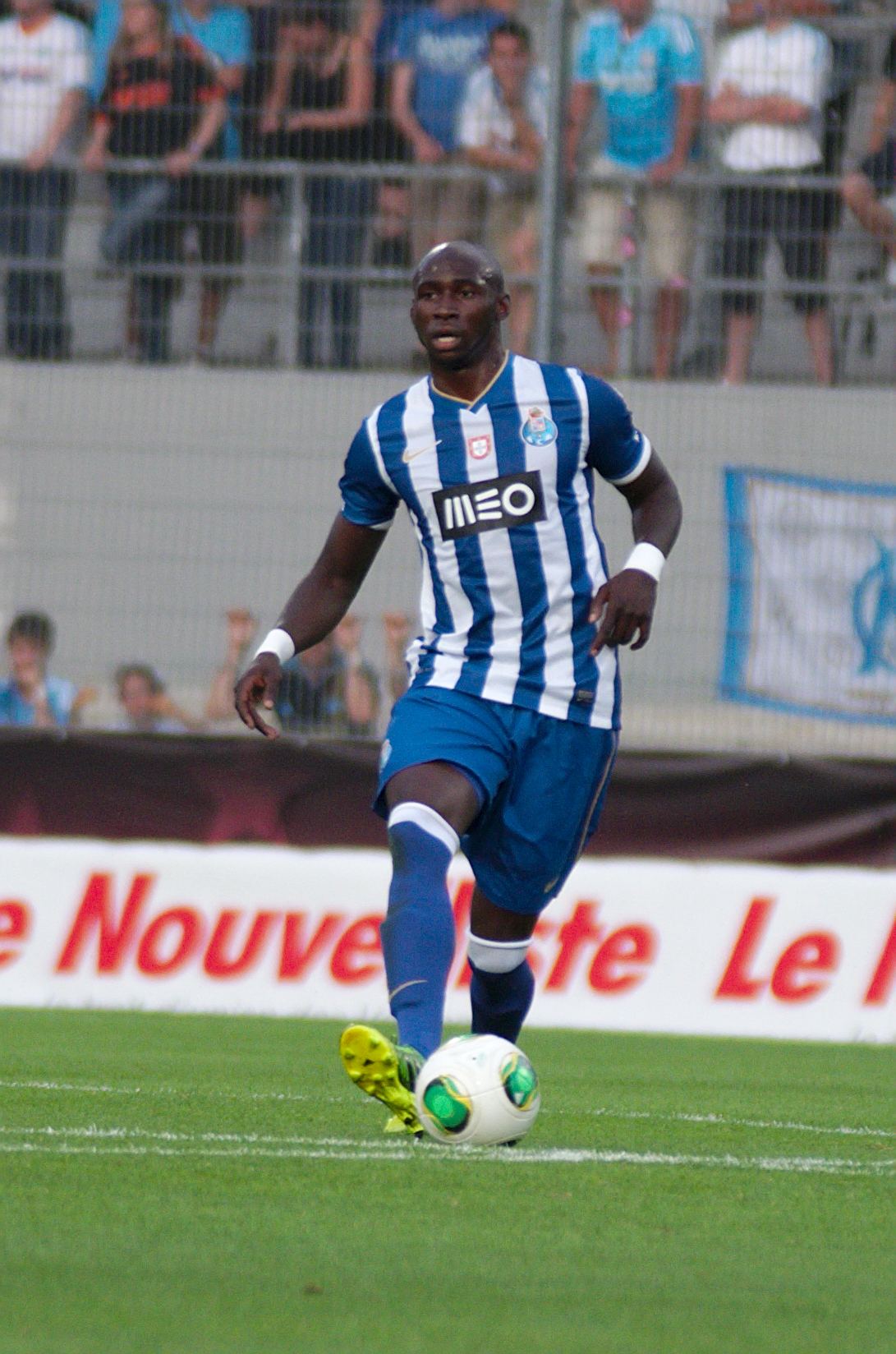
Mangala playing for Porto in 2013

Mangala joined reigning Europa League champions Porto on 16 August 2011. The deal also included Porto signing his Standard teammate Steven Defour in a combined deal that totalled £11.4 million. He played his first season with Porto as a substitute behind the likes of Rolando, Maicon and Nicolás Otamendi. He made his first appearance in the 2012–13 season for Porto in the Supertaça Cândido de Oliveira against Académica on 11 August 2012, playing the full 90 minutes as Porto won the pre-season title with a 1–0 win. He made his first-team breakthrough with Porto that season, becoming the first-choice centre back and scoring four league goals, one of which was in a 2–2 draw with Benfica on 13 January 2013. Mangala featured in Porto's 2–0 win over Paços de Ferreira on 19 May 2013, leading the club to an undefeated season and a third-straight league title, by just one point over rivals Benfica.

In the January 2014 transfer window, Manchester City made an offer for Mangala and his teammate Fernando, but abandoned interest when Porto held out for £50 million. On 23 February, he was sent off for a reckless challenge inside the area and Porto fell to a 1–0 defeat to Estoril as Evandro converted the spot kick. In Porto's Europa League Round of 16-second leg against Eintracht Frankfurt four days later, Mangala scored two goals, both from headers, as Porto battled back from 2–0 down to draw 3–3 and secure passage to the quarter-finals on away goals. On 3 April, he headed in the game's only goal as Porto defeated Sevilla in the first-leg of that round. His goal would not be enough to guide the Portuguese into the next round as they fell to a 4–1 loss in Spain seven days later.

=== Manchester City ===
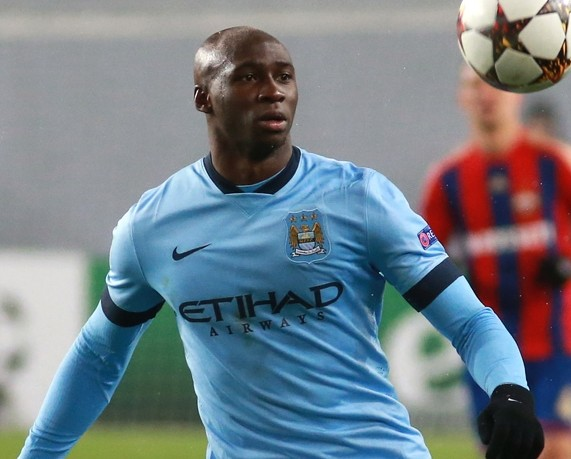
Mangala playing for Manchester City in 2014

On 11 August 2014, Mangala signed for English club Manchester City on a five-year contract, for a reported £31.8 million transfer fee. It was however reported 18 months into his contract that the fee was more in the region of £42m due to spiralling costs as a result of Mangala's split ownership at Porto, with City having to pay in the region of £18m to two companies which owned over 40% of Mangala's economic rights. This second figure would make Mangala the most expensive defender in British transfer history at the time. He reunited with his former Porto teammate, Fernando, who had joined City earlier in the summer.

Mangala made his debut in City's fifth match of the Premier League season, a 1–1 home draw against Chelsea on 21 September. Lining up alongside captain Vincent Kompany, his performance was described by BBC Sport as "colossal". Six days later, an own goal and concession of a penalty by Mangala caused City to lose a 2–0 lead against Hull City, although they eventually triumphed 4–2. Despite media criticism, manager Manuel Pellegrini said "we continue to trust him because he is a very good player who had very bad luck". On 30 November, Mangala was sent off for two yellow cards in City's 3–0 win away to Southampton.

==== Valencia (loan) ====
On 31 August 2016, Mangala joined Spanish club Valencia on a season-long loan. He made his debut for the Che on 11 September, starting alongside fellow newcomer Ezequiel Garay in a 3–2 home loss to Real Betis. On 28 February 2017, he scored his first goal to defeat Leganés at Mestalla, and on 19 March he headed the opening goal of a 4–2 away loss at FC Barcelona in which he was sent off for pulling at Luis Suárez in the penalty area.

==== Everton (loan) ====
Mangala joined Premier League club Everton on loan on 31 January 2018. He made his debut against Arsenal, but in his second game against Crystal Palace he was forced off at half-time with a knee injury. He later underwent surgery and was ruled out for the remainder of the season. At the end of the season he was eligible for a Premier League winners' medal having previously made nine league appearances for Manchester City before joining Everton.

=== Valencia ===
On 12 August 2019, Mangala returned to former club Valencia on a permanent basis after agreeing to a two-year contract on a free transfer. He and teammates Ezequiel Garay and José Luis Gayà tested positive for COVID-19 virus during the COVID-19 pandemic in Spain.

=== Saint-Étienne ===
On 20 January 2022, Mangala signed for Saint-Étienne on a free transfer, on a six-month contract. He played 14 Ligue 1 matches, and scored an equaliser in a 2–1 home loss to Reims in the penultimate fixture on 14 May. He was suspended three times due to accumulating nine yellow cards, missing the first leg of the promotion/relegation playoff against Auxerre and returning in the second leg for the penalty shootout defeat.

=== Estoril ===
On 7 August 2023, being without a club for over a year, Mangala returned to Portugal to join Primeira Liga club Estoril after trialling with the side, he was signed on a one-year deal.

=== Retirement ===
On 26 June 2026, Mangala announced his retirement from professional football.

== International career ==
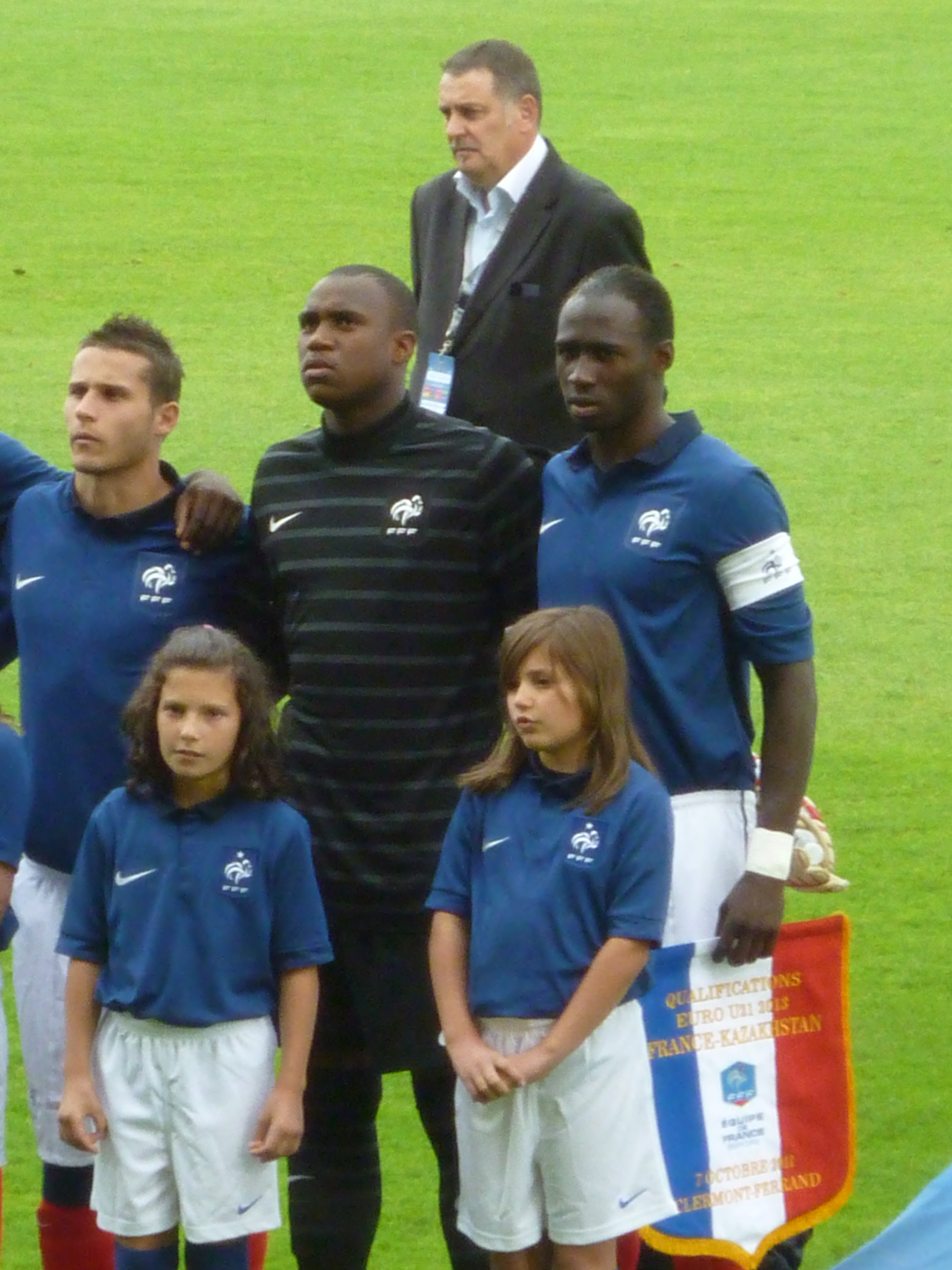
Mangala lining up as the captain of France U21 in 2011

Due to being raised in Belgium, Mangala did not feature with any of France's youth football teams. In 2008, he was approached by the Royal Belgian Football Association who called the player up to the country's under-18 national team. However, due to not possessing a passport at the time, the call up was deemed futile. After excelling with Standard Liège's senior team, Mangala drew the interest of the French Football Federation with France under-21 manager Erick Mombaerts attending a match between Liège and Mouscron at the Stade Le Canonnier in November. On 5 November 2009, Mangala was selected, for the first time, to the under-21 team for a friendly match against Tunisia on 13 November and a 2011 UEFA European Under-21 Championship qualification match against Slovenia on 17 November. Mangala made his under-21 debut in the Tunisia match, but missed the match against Slovenia after withdrawing from the team due to an injury suffered the previous day in training. On 2 March 2010, he earned his second straight selection to the under-21 team and started in central defence alongside captain Mamadou Sakho in the team's 3–1 win over Croatia.

Mangala made his debut with the France senior team in a 1–0 loss to Uruguay on 6 June 2013. He was included in France's squad for the 2014 FIFA World Cup but did not make an appearance during the tournament, in which Les Bleus reached the quarter-finals.

Mangala was also included in France's squad that finished runners-up at UEFA Euro 2016 on home soil. He made one appearance in the quarter-finals on 3 July, replacing Laurent Koscielny for the final 18 minutes of a 5–2 win over Iceland at the Stade de France.

== Career statistics ==
=== Club ===
As of 10 June 2025

Appearances and goals by club, season and competition
Club	Season	League			National Cup		League Cup		Europe		Other		Total	
Club	Season	Division	Apps	Goals	Apps	Goals	Apps	Goals	Apps	Goals	Apps	Goals	Apps	Goals
Standard Liège	2008–09	Belgian First Division	11	0	0	0	—		3	0	0	0	14	0
Standard Liège	2009–10	Belgian Pro League	31	1	3	0	—		11	1	1	0	46	2
Standard Liège	2010–11	Belgian Pro League	35	1	5	1	—		—		—		40	2
Standard Liège	Total		77	2	8	1	—		14	1	1	0	100	4
Porto	2011–12	Primeira Liga	7	0	1	0	4	1	2	0	—		14	1
Porto	2012–13	Primeira Liga	23	4	2	2	5	1	8	0	1	0	39	7
Porto	2013–14	Primeira Liga	21	2	4	0	4	0	12	3	1	0	42	5
Porto	Total		51	6	7	2	13	2	22	3	2	0	95	13
Manchester City	2014–15	Premier League	25	0	1	0	2	0	3	0	0	0	31	0
Manchester City	2015–16	Premier League	23	0	0	0	3	0	7	0	—		33	0
Manchester City	2017–18	Premier League	9	0	0	0	4	0	2	0	—		15	0
Manchester City	2018–19	Premier League	0	0	0	0	0	0	0	0	0	0	0	0
Manchester City	Total		57	0	1	0	9	0	12	0	0	0	79	0
Valencia (loan)	2016–17	La Liga	30	2	3	0	—		—		—		33	2
Everton (loan)	2017–18	Premier League	2	0	—		—		—		—		2	0
Valencia	2019–20	La Liga	8	0	1	0	—		2	0	0	0	11	0
Valencia	2020–21	La Liga	7	0	3	0	—		—		—		10	0
Valencia	Total		15	0	4	0	—		2	0	0	0	21	0
Saint-Étienne	2021–22	Ligue 1	14	1	0	0	—		—		1	0	15	1
Estoril	2023–24	Primeira Liga	17	1	2	0	3	0	—		—		22	1
Estoril	2024–25	Primeira Liga	9	0	0	0	0	0	—		—		9	0
Estoril	Total		26	1	2	0	3	0	0	0	0	0	31	1
Career total			272	12	25	3	25	2	50	4	4	0	376	21

=== International ===
Appearances and goals by national team and year
National team	Year	Apps	Goals
France	2013	1	0
France	2014	4	0
France	2015	2	0
France	2016	1	0
Total		8	0

== Honours ==
Standard Liège

- Belgian First Division: 2008–09
- Belgian Cup: 2010–11
- Belgian Super Cup: 2009

Porto

- Primeira Liga: 2011–12, 2012–13
- Supertaça Cândido de Oliveira: 2012, 2013

Manchester City

- Premier League: 2017–18

Individual

- O Jogo Team of the Year: 2013
- UEFA Europa League Squad of the season: 2013–14
