= Franck Berrier =

French footballer (1984–2021)

- Berrier with Oostende in 2016

Personal information
- Date of birth: 2 February 1984
- Place of birth: Argentan, France
- Date of death: 13 August 2021 (aged 37)
- Height: 1.77 m (5 ft 10 in)
- Position: Midfielder

Youth career
- 2000–2004: Caen

Senior career*
Years	Team	Apps	(Gls)
2004–2005	Caen	2	(0)
2005–2007	Beauvais	38	(10)
2007–2008	Cannes	35	(12)
2008–2010	Zulte Waregem	58	(8)
2010–2012	Standard Liège	13	(2)
2012–2013	Zulte Waregem	55	(15)
2013–2014	→ Oostende (loan)	20	(0)
2014–2018	Oostende	86	(16)
2018	KV Mechelen	0	(0)
Total		307	(63)

Managerial career
- 2019: KV Mechelen (scout)
- 2020: KV Oostende (assistant)
- * Club domestic league appearances and goals

Franck Berrier (2 February 1984 – 13 August 2021) was a French professional footballer who played as a midfielder, spending much of his career in Belgium.

== Career ==
On 12 May 2010, Berrier left S.V. Zulte Waregem to sign a three-year deal with Standard Liège.

== Post-playing career ==
After retiring in January 2019 due to heart problems, Berrier was hired in the scouting department of KV Mechelen. He left the position on 1 December 2019, when his contract expired.

In March 2020, he joined K.V. Oostende as an assistant coach under Adnan Čustović. The duo left again at the end of the season.

On 12 August 2021, Berrier suffered a heart attack and was then rushed to the hospital in critical condition. The next day, he suffered a second heart attack and died. He was aged 37.

== Honours ==
Standard Liège

- Belgian Cup: 2010–11
