= Dieter Dekelver =

Belgian footballer

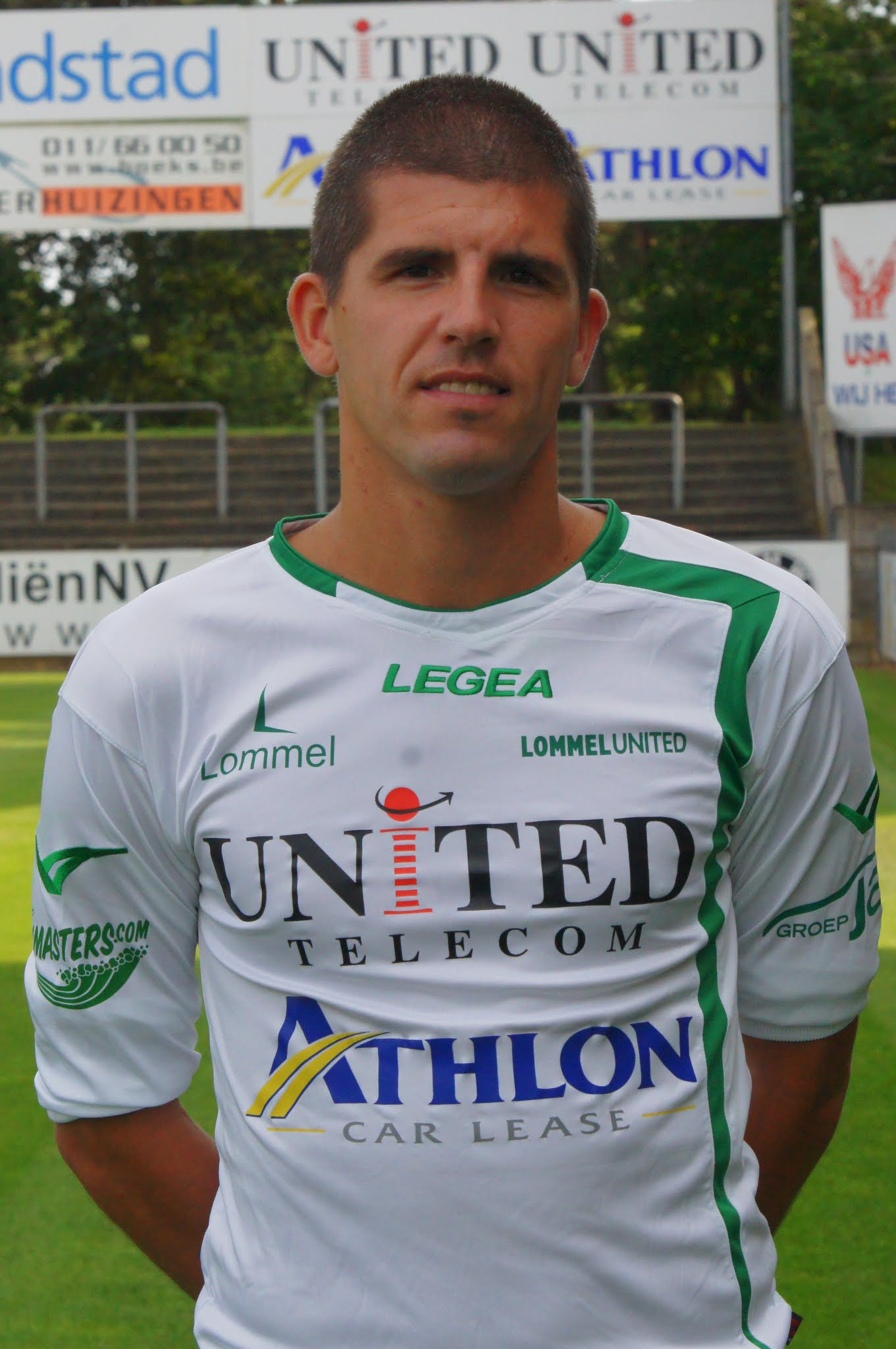

Personal information
- Date of birth: 17 August 1979 (age 47)
- Place of birth: Beringen, Belgium
- Height: 1.81 m (5 ft 11 in)
- Position: Forward

Youth career
- 1987–1990: Gerhees Oostham
- 1991–1997: SK Lommel

Senior career*
Years	Team	Apps	(Gls)
1997–2002	SK Lommel	106	(30)
2003	FC Strombeek		
2003–2004	FC Brussels	32	(16)
2004–2007	Cercle Brugge	76	(23)
2007–2012	VC Westerlo	119	(28)
2012–2013	Lommel United	19	(5)

International career
	Belgium	0	(0)
- * Club domestic league appearances and goals

Dieter Dekelver (born 17 August 1979) is a Belgian former professional footballer who played as a forward.
