= Koen Daerden =

Belgian football coach and former player

Personal information
- Date of birth: 8 March 1982 (age 44)
- Place of birth: Tongeren, Belgium
- Height: 1.91 m (6 ft 3 in)
- Position: Midfielder

Team information
- Current team: Racing Genk (head of youth)

Youth career
- K.V.'s Herenelderen FC
- KSK Tongeren

Senior career*
Years	Team	Apps	(Gls)
1999–2006	Racing Genk	162	(24)
2006–2010	Club Brugge	47	(16)
2010–2012	Standard Liège	26	(10)
2011–2012	→ Sint-Truiden (loan)	19	(1)
2013	MVV Maastricht	11	(1)
Total		265	(52)

International career
2000–2001	Belgium U18	9	(3)
2001–2003	Belgium U21	8	(3)
2002–2007	Belgium	10	(3)

Managerial career
- 2014–2015: MVV Maastricht (assistant)
- 2014–2015: Racing Genk (youth)
- 2015–: Racing Genk (head of youth)
- * Club domestic league appearances and goals

Koen Daerden (Dutch pronunciation: [kun ˈdaːrdə(n)]; born 8 March 1982) is a Belgian former professional football player and current coach, who works as sporting director for the youth or head of the youth department at Racing Genk.

== Club career ==
Daerden was born in Tongeren. He started his senior career with K.R.C. Genk, where he became captain.

He signed a one-year contract with Club Brugge in June 2006 for a reported transfer fee of €4,000,000.

On 15 January 2010, Daerden joined Standard Liège from Club Brugge until June 2013. However, after a loan spell at Sint-Truiden, he was released in the summer of 2013 due to a lack of playing time.

After being on trial with Dutch side Willem II in the summer of 2013, Daerden eventually signed with Dutch Eerste Divisie side MVV Maastricht. On the last day of 2013, Daerden decided to retire from professional football as a result of sustained injuries.

== International career ==
Daerden also played ten times for the Belgium national team.

== Career statistics ==
=== International goals ===
Scores and results list Belgium's goal tally first, score column indicates score after each Daerden goal.

List of international goals scored by Koen Daerden
No.	Date	Venue	Opponent	Score	Result	Competition
1	26 March 2005	Stade Roi Baudouin, Brussels	Bosnia and Herzegovina	2–1	4–1	2006 World Cup Qualification
2	7 September 2005	Olympisch Stadion, Antwerp	San Marino	2–0	8–0	2006 World Cup Qualification
3	7 September 2005	Olympisch Stadion, Antwerp	San Marino	6–0	8–0	2006 World Cup Qualification

== Honours ==
Genk

- Belgian First Division: 2001–02
- Belgian Cup: 1999–2000

Standard Liège

- Belgian Cup: 2010–11
