= Srđan Blažić =

Montenegrin footballer

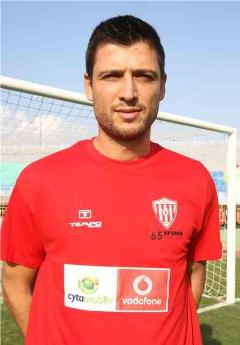

Personal information
- Date of birth: 26 November 1982 (age 43)
- Place of birth: Titograd, Yugoslavia
- Height: 1.98 m (6 ft 6 in)
- Position: Goalkeeper

Senior career*
Years	Team	Apps	(Gls)
2000–2001	Zeta	1	(0)
2001–2002	Budućnost Podgorica	6	(0)
2002	Mornar	14	(0)
2003–2004	Kom	20	(0)
2005–2006	Zora	51	(0)
2006–2007	Rudar Pljevlja	33	(0)
2007–2010	Levadiakos	59	(0)
2010–2011	Standard Liège	16	(0)
2011–2012	Panetolikos	12	(0)
2012–2013	Anorthosis	0	(0)
2013–2014	Nea Salamis (loan)	15	(0)
2014–2015	Lamia	22	(0)
2015–2016	Chania	13	(0)
2016–2021	Iskra	116	(0)

International career^{‡}
2009–2010	Montenegro	2	(0)
- * Club domestic league appearances and goals as of 11 September 2016 ‡ National team caps and goals as of 26 May 2012

Srđan Blažić (Cyrillic: Срђан Блажић; born 26 November 1982) is a Montenegrin retired football goalkeeper.

== Club career ==
In January 2010, Standard Liège officials struck a deal with the Montenegrin goalkeeper, who left Greek club Levadiakos on a free transfer at the end of the season. He signed with Panetolikos in August 2011

=== Anorthosis / Nea Salamina ===
On 29 May 2012, he signed a two-year contract with Anorthosis Famagusta FC. On January he was given on loan to Nea Salamis Famagusta FC.

On 2 July 2013, Blažić's contract with Anorthosis was mutually terminated.

== International career ==
Blažić made his debut for Montenegro in a November 2009 friendly match against Belarus and has earned a total of 2 caps, scoring no goals. His second and final international was a November 2010 friendly against Azerbaijan.

== Honours ==
Standard Liège

- Belgian Cup: 2010–11
