= Steven De Petter =

Belgian footballer (born 1985)

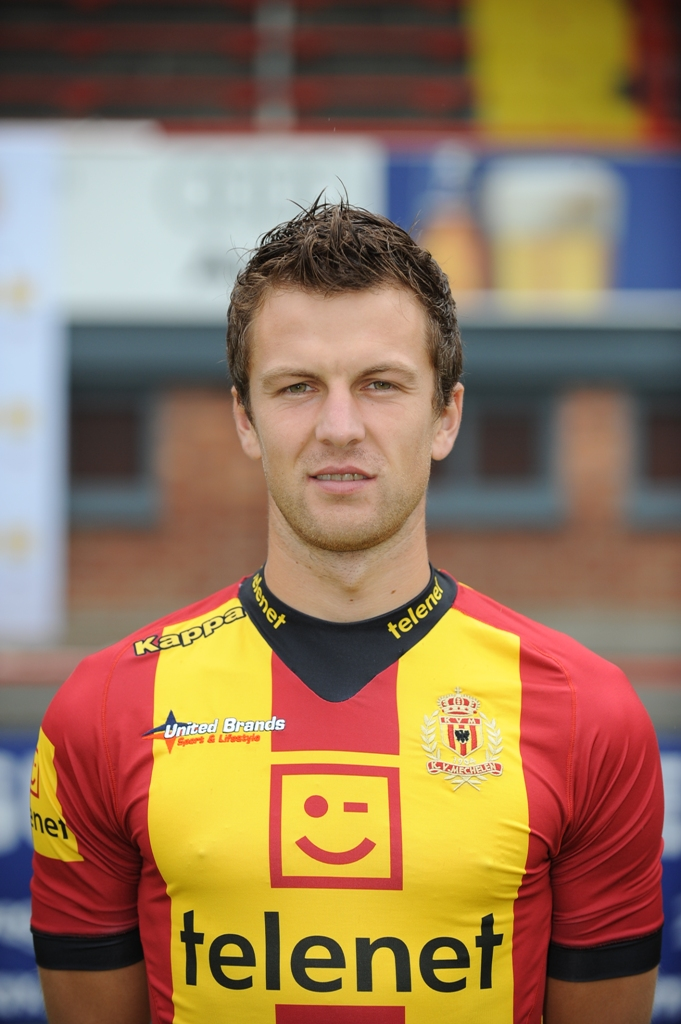

Personal information
- Full name: Steven De Petter
- Date of birth: 22 November 1985 (age 40)
- Place of birth: Aalst, Belgium
- Height: 1.81 m (5 ft 11 in)
- Position: Midfielder

Youth career
- 1993–1998: Terjoden-Welle
- 1998–2002: FC Denderleeuw

Senior career*
Years	Team	Apps	(Gls)
2002–2005	FC Denderleeuw	57	(1)
2005–2009	FCV Dender EH	107	(13)
2009–2012	Westerlo	90	(14)
2012–2016	Mechelen	86	(12)
2016–2020	Sint-Truidense	91	(4)
- * Club domestic league appearances and goals as of 21:16, 11 August 2021 (UTC)

Steven De Petter (born 22 November 1985) is a retired Belgian football player. He was born in Aalst, Belgium.

De Petter retired in the summer 2020.
