= Evariste Ngolok =

Cameroonian footballer

Personal information
- Full name: Evariste N'Golok
- Date of birth: November 15, 1988 (age 37)
- Place of birth: Cameroon
- Height: 1.78 m (5 ft 10 in)
- Position: Defensive midfielder

Youth career
- WS Woluwe FC
- –2005: RFC Liège
- 2005–2006: R.S.C. Anderlecht

Senior career*
Years	Team	Apps	(Gls)
2007–2009	Anderlecht	2	(0)
2007–2008	→ Union SG (loan)	19	(1)
2009–2011	Dender EH	49	(9)
2011–2012	Westerlo	37	(4)
2012–2014	OH Leuven	57	(7)
2014–2017	Lokeren	29	(7)
2017–2018	Aris Limassol	17	(1)
2019	ÍBV	5	(0)
Total		215	(29)
- * Club domestic league appearances and goals as of 23:19, 31 May 2019 (UTC)

Evariste Ngolok (born November 15, 1988, in Cameroon) is a Cameroonian footballer last seen playing for ÍBV.

== Career ==
Ngolok is a defensive midfielder who made his debut in professional football, being part of the R. Union Saint-Gilloise squad in the 2007-08 season.
