= Mbaye Leye =

Senegalese footballer

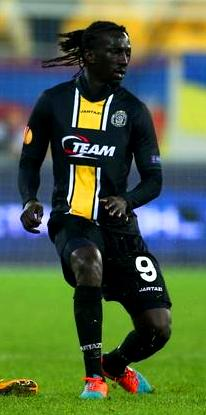

Personal information
- Date of birth: 1 December 1982 (age 43)
- Place of birth: Birkelane, Senegal
- Height: 1.83 m (6 ft 0 in)
- Position: Striker

Team information
- Current team: Gent (assistant coach)

Youth career
- Dakar UC

Senior career*
Years	Team	Apps	(Gls)
2000–2004	OC Cesson Sévigné	?	(?)
2004–2006	FC Lorient B	?	(?)
2006–2007	Amiens SC	15	(3)
2007–2008	Zulte Waregem	47	(25)
2009–2010	KAA Gent	46	(11)
2010–2012	Standard Liège	43	(8)
2012–2014	Zulte Waregem	58	(21)
2014–2015	Lokeren	32	(5)
2015–2017	Zulte Waregem	78	(36)
2017–2018	Eupen	26	(9)
2018–2019	Mouscron	24	(6)
Total		369	(124)

International career
2008	Senegal	3	(0)

Managerial career
- 2019–2020: Standard Liège (assistant)
- 2020–2021: Standard Liège
- 2022–2023: Zulte Waregem
- 2024–2025: Seraing
- 2025–: Gent (assistant)
- * Club domestic league appearances and goals

Mbaye Leye (born 1 December 1982) is a Senegalese football manager and former professional footballer who played as a striker. He is an assistant coach with Belgian Pro League club Gent. Born in Senegal, Leye started his professional career in France before moving to Belgium in 2007. He played in Belgium until his retirement in 2019, finishing his playing career with Mouscron. As a player, he played for the Senegal national team.

== Playing career ==
Leye played for Standard Liège from 2010 to 2012, scoring 11 goals in 56 games. He helped them to win the Belgian Cup in 2011.

He also won the Belgian Cup with KAA Gent in 2010 and in 2017 with Zulte Waregem where he had three spells.

Over the course of his professional career in Belgium, Leye netted 124 goals in 369 Belgian top flight league games and featured in 21 European cup matches scoring three goals.

At international level, he was capped seven times by Senegal.

== Coaching career ==
Leye began his coaching career in June 2019 at his former club, Standard Liège. On 4 October 2021, he was fired by Standard Liège, following four losses in the preceding five games.

Before the 2022–23 season, Leye was hired by Zulte Waregem.

On 19 December 2025, Leye joined Gent as an assistant coach.

== Career statistics ==
Appearances and goals by club, season and competition
Club	Season	League			Cup		Other		Total	
Club	Season	Division	Apps	Goals	Apps	Goals	Apps	Goals	Apps	Goals
Zulte Waregem	2008–09	Belgian First Division	16	9	0	0	0	0	16	9
Gent	2008–09	Belgian First Division	12	4	0	0	0	0	12	4
Gent	2009–10	Belgian Pro League	34	7	5	2	3 (Note: Appearances in UEFA Europa League)	1	42	10
Gent	2010–11	Belgian Pro League	0	0	0	0	2 (Note: One Appearance in Belgian Super Cup, One Appearance in UEFA Champions League)	0	2	0
Gent	Total		46	11	5	2	5	1	56	14
Standard Liège	2010–11	Belgian Pro League	32	5	7	2	0	0	39	7
Standard Liège	2011–12	Belgian Pro League	11	3	0	0	6 (Note: One Appearance in Belgian Super Cup, Three Appearances in UEFA Europa League, Two Appearances in UEFA Champions League)	1	17	4
Standard Liège	Total		43	8	7	2	6	1	56	11
Zulte Waregem	2011–12	Belgian Pro League	12	3	0	0	0	0	12	3
Zulte Waregem	2012–13	Belgian Pro League	36	17	3	1	0	0	39	18
Zulte Waregem	2013–14	Belgian Pro League	10	1	1	0	3 (Note: Two Appearances in UEFA Champions League, One Appearance in UEFA Europa League)	0	14	1
Zulte Waregem	Total		58	21	4	1	3	0	65	22
Lokeren	2014–15	Belgian Pro League	32	5	2	2	8	1	42	8
Zulte Waregem	2015–16	Belgian Pro League	38	20	2	0	0	0	40	20
Zulte Waregem	2016–17	Belgian First Division A	40	16	6	2	0	0	46	18
Zulte Waregem	Total		78	36	8	2	0	0	86	38
AS Eupen	2017–18	Belgian First Division A	21	9	2	1	0	0	23	10
Career total			294	99	28	10	22	3	344	112

== Managerial statistics ==
As of match played 1 October 2021

Managerial record by team and tenure
Team	From	To	Record				
Team	From	To	G	W	D	L	Win %
Standard Liège	30 December 2020	4 October 2021	36	15	6	15	41.67
Total			36	15	6	15	41.67

== Honours ==
Gent

- Belgian Cup: 2009–10

Standard Liège

- Belgian Cup: 2010–11

Zulte Waregem

- Belgian Cup: 2016–17

Individual

- Belgian Ebony Shoe: 2013
