= Kanu (footballer, born 1984) =

Brazilian footballer

Personal information
- Full name: Antônio Eduardo Pereira dos Santos
- Date of birth: 3 May 1984 (age 42)
- Place of birth: Salvador, Brazil
- Height: 1.87 m (6 ft 2 in)
- Position: Centre-back

Team information
- Current team: Jacuipense

Youth career
- 2003: Cabofriense

Senior career*
Years	Team	Apps	(Gls)
2004	Cabofriense		
2005	Alecrim		
2005	Teotônio		
2006	ABC		
2007	Ituano	3	(0)
2008	Águia Negra		
2008–2011	Beira-Mar	71	(6)
2011–2014	Standard Liège	88	(4)
2014–2015	Vitória Guimarães	5	(1)
2015	→ Vitória (loan)	8	(1)
2016	OH Leuven	7	(1)
2016–2018	Vitória	109	(12)
2019	Oeste	28	(0)
2020	Juazeirense	7	(0)
2020–2021	Jacuipense	28	(1)
2021	Sampaio Corrêa	2	(0)
2023–	Jacuipense	0	(0)
- * Club domestic league appearances and goals as of 21:03, 15 November 2022 (UTC)

Antônio Eduardo Pereira dos Santos (born 3 May 1984), commonly known as Kanu, is a Brazilian footballer who plays as a centre-back for Jacuipense.

== Career ==
Kanu joined Beira-Mar in the summer of 2008 from Águia Negra. His time with Auri-negros saw him feature regularly in a side which in the 2009–10 season claimed the Segunda Liga, thus gaining promotion to the Portuguese top flight. Kanu scored the goal which sealed promotion to the top flight against Carregado.

In January 2011, Kanu would leave Beira-Mar for Belgian side Standard Liège on an undisclosed fee. In the summer of 2013, he attracted interest from Anderlecht and Sporting CP, but decided to stay with Standard Liège.

After his release from Liège in the summer of 2014, Kanu signed for Primeira Liga side Vitória de Guimarães.

On 29 December 2015, Belgian Pro League team Oud-Heverlee Leuven announced the signing of Kanu for two and a half years as he was brought in to help the team avoid relegation, however only three months later as the team had suffered relegation his contract was deemed to be too much of a burden for the second division and he was subsequently released. In his short period back in Belgium, Kanu appeared seven times, scoring one goal against Lokeren.

== Honours ==
Beira-Mar

- Segunda Liga: 2009–10

Standard Liège

- Belgian Cup: 2010–11

Vitória

- Campeonato Baiano: 2017

Individual

- Beira-Mar Player of the Year: 2010
