= Felipe Trevizan =

Brazilian footballer (born 1987)

Personal information
- Full name: Felipe Trevizan Martins
- Date of birth: 15 May 1987 (age 39)
- Place of birth: Americana, Brazil
- Height: 1.93 m (6 ft 4 in)
- Position: Centre-back

Team information
- Current team: Lemense

Youth career
- Rio Branco-SP
- 2006: FC Basel
- 2006–2007: Coritiba

Senior career*
Years	Team	Apps	(Gls)
2007–2009	Coritiba	35	(1)
2009–2012	Standard Liège	58	(3)
2012–2020	Hannover 96	61	(4)
2020–2021	Boluspor	0	(0)
2022–	Lemense	0	(0)
- * Club domestic league appearances and goals as of 4 January 2021

Felipe Trevizan Martins or simply Felipe (born 15 May 1987) is a Brazilian professional footballer who plays as a centre-back for Lemense.

== Career ==
On 28 August 2009, Felipe Trevizan transferred from Coritiba Foot Ball Club to Belgium club Standard Liège, the transfer fee was € 1.2 million, plus an option for his old club with 10% involved in the resale.

Felipe Trevizan played in four games for Standard against German Bundesliga side Hannover 96 in the 2011–12 UEFA Europa League and left a lasting impression. After the tournament, Hannover became interested in signing him, and on 20 June 2012, Felipe joined the Bundesliga club. On 12 September 2015, Felipe conceded two penalties and scored an own goal in Hannover's match against Borussia Dortmund.

On 1 September 2020, Felipe Trevizan agreed the termination of his contract with Hannover 96.

On 14 September 2020, Felipe Trevizan signed for Turkish second tier side Boluspor.

== Honours ==
Standard Liège

- Belgian Cup: 2010–11
