= Adnan Mravac =

Bosnia and Herzegovina footballer (born 1982)

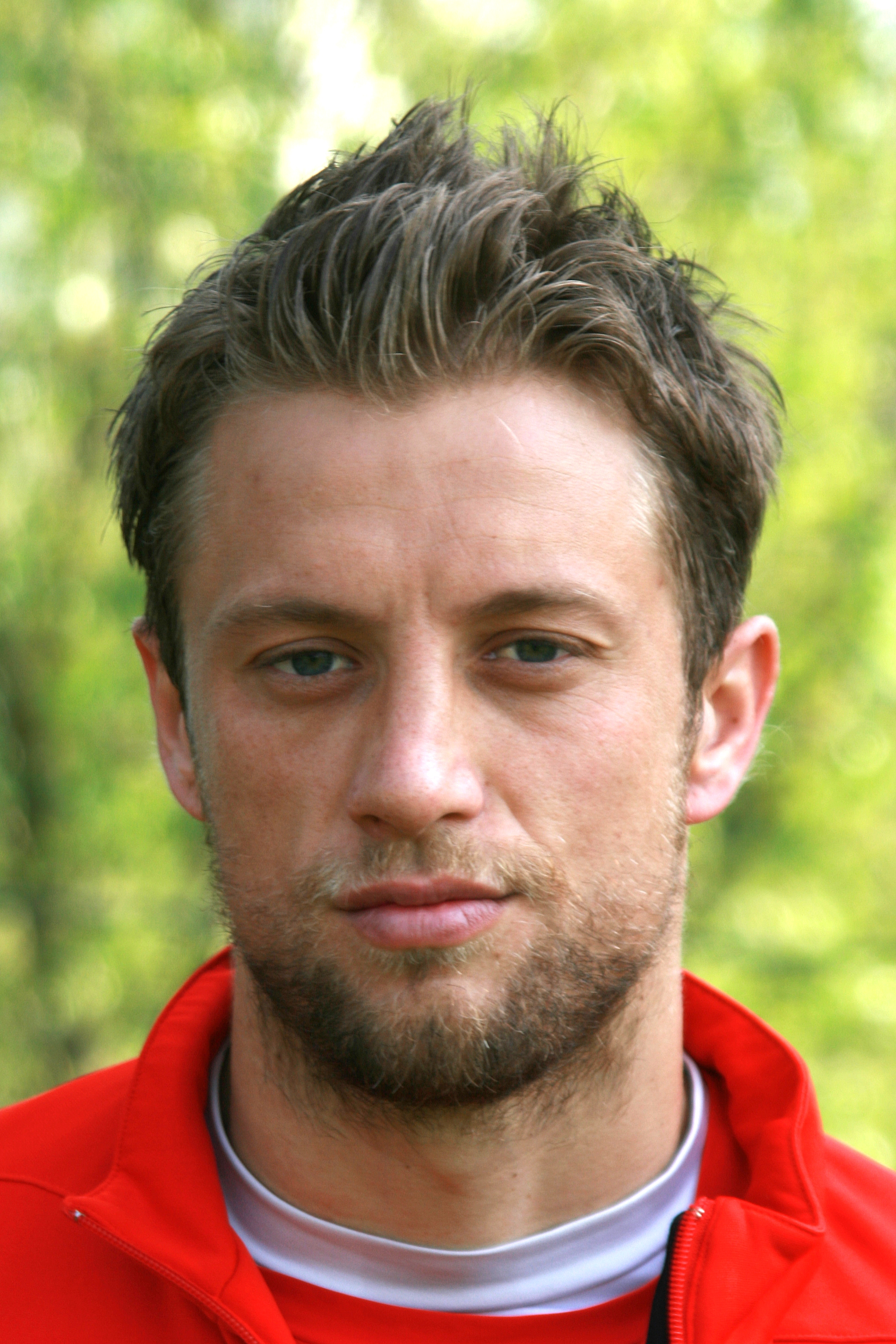
- Mravac with SV Mattersburg

Personal information
- Full name: Adnan Mravac
- Date of birth: 10 April 1982 (age 44)
- Place of birth: Banja Luka, SFR Yugoslavia
- Height: 1.90 m (6 ft 3 in)
- Position: Defender

Youth career
- Jedinstvo Bihać
- Čakovec

Senior career*
Years	Team	Apps	(Gls)
2001	Lillestrøm II	9	(0)
2002	Čakovec	5	(0)
2002–2009	SV Mattersburg	185	(3)
2009–2011	Westerlo	54	(3)
2011–2013	SV Mattersburg	64	(0)
2013–2014	Dynamo Dresden	8	(0)
2015–2016	SC Mannsdorf	11	(1)
2016–2017	Admira Landhaus	0	(0)

International career
2003–2004	Bosnia and Herzegovina U21	5	(0)
2008–2011	Bosnia and Herzegovina	13	(0)
- * Club domestic league appearances and goals as of 29 October 2010

Adnan Mravac (born 10 April 1982) is a Bosnian-Herzegovinian former professional footballer who played as a defender. He made 13 appearances for the Bosnia and Herzegovina national team.

He also holds Austrian citizenship.

== International career ==
He made his debut for Bosnia and Herzegovina in an October 2008 FIFA World Cup qualification match against Armenia and has earned a total of 13 caps, scoring no goals. His final international was an August 2011 friendly match against Greece.
