= Daniel Opare =

Ghanaian footballer (born 1990)

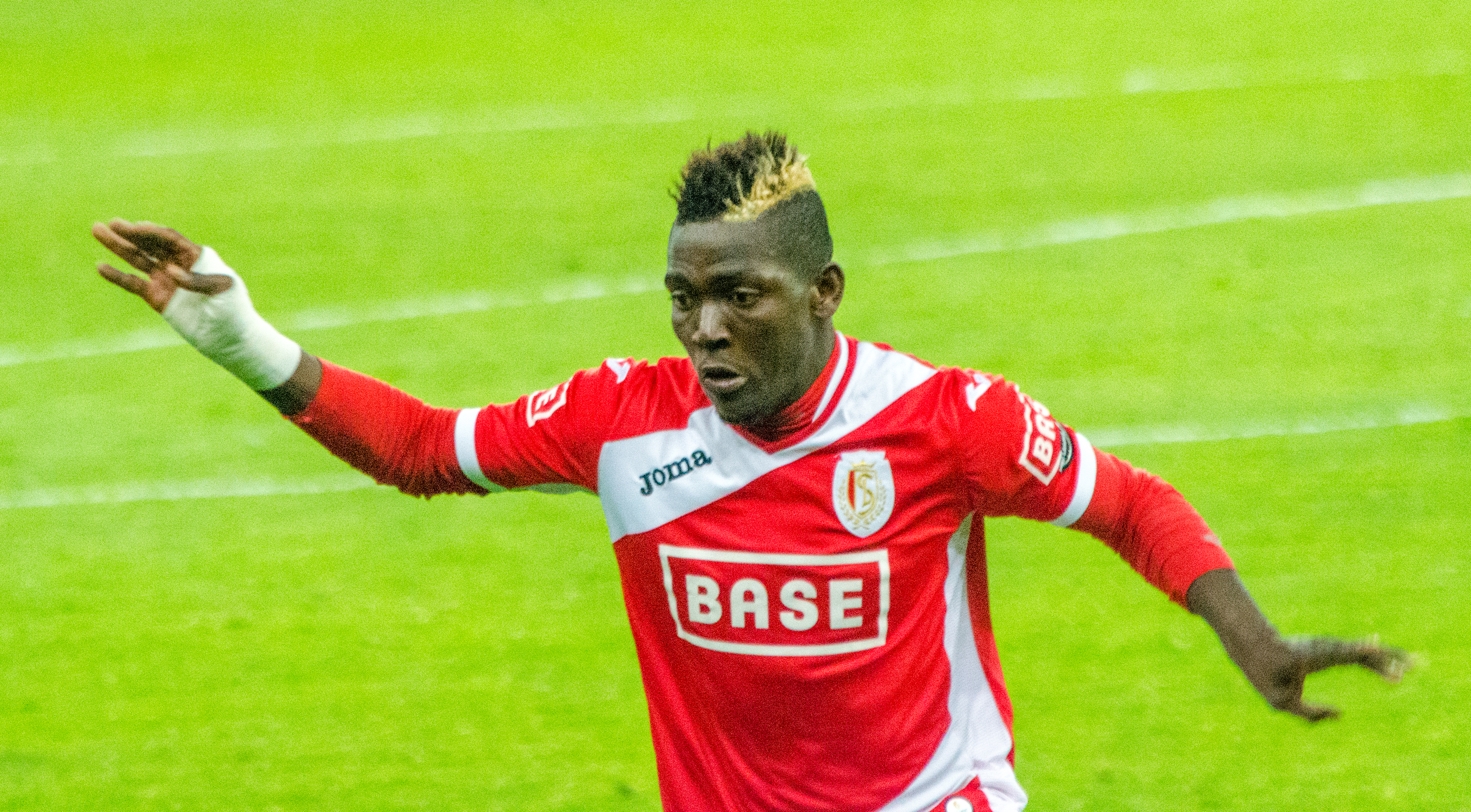
- Opare with Standard Liège in 2014

Personal information
- Full name: Daniel Tawiah Opare
- Date of birth: 18 October 1990 (age 36)
- Place of birth: Accra, Greater Accra, Ghana
- Height: 1.73 m (5 ft 8 in)
- Position: Right back

Youth career
- 2001: Volta Academy
- 2001–2004: Ajax Football Academy
- 2004–2007: Ashanti Gold

Senior career*
Years	Team	Apps	(Gls)
2006–2007	Ashanti Gold	14	(4)
2007–2008	CS Sfaxien	21	(6)
2008–2010	Real Madrid Castilla	6	(0)
2010–2014	Standard Liège	88	(0)
2014–2015	Porto	0	(0)
2014	Porto B	2	(0)
2015	→ Beşiktaş (loan)	6	(1)
2015–2018	FC Augsburg	21	(0)
2017	→ Lens (loan)	7	(0)
2018–2020	Antwerp	23	(0)
2020–2021	Zulte Waregem	29	(0)
2022–2023	Seraing	35	(0)

International career^{‡}
2007	Ghana U17	7	(0)
2009	Ghana U20	2	(0)
2007–2018	Ghana	19	(0)
Medal record
Football
CS Sfaxien
Winner	CAF Confederation Cup	2008
Runner-up	CAF Super Cup	2008
Standard Liège
Winner	Belgian Cup	2011
Runner-up	Belgian Super Cup	2011
Runner-up	Belgian Pro League	2014
Ghana
Winner	FIFA U-20 World Cup	2009
- * Club domestic league appearances and goals as of 6 June 2023 ‡ National team caps and goals as of 6 June 2019 (UTC)

Daniel Tawiah Opare (/ɒˈpæˈreɪ/; born 18 October 1990) is a Ghanaian former professional footballer who played as a right-back.

== Club career ==
=== Early career ===
In November 2007, Opare was recognized by World Soccer as one of the "50 Most Exciting Teenagers on the Planet". He received rave reviews for using his incredible footspeed and precision crossing to great effect for the Ghana national under-17 team, the Black Starlets, at the 2007 U-17 World Cup.

On 3 July 2010, Opare left Real Madrid Castilla to sign for Belgian club Standard Liège.

On 20 May 2014, just before the 2014 FIFA World Cup, it was announced Opare had signed for Portuguese club Porto after a successful four-year stint with Standard Liège.

=== Augsburg ===
On 13 August 2015, Opare signed a three-year contract with German club FC Augsburg for an undisclosed transfer fee.

=== Royal Antwerp ===
In July 2018 Opare signed a contract with Belgian club Royal Antwerp as a free agent after his contract with his previous team had run out.

=== Seraing ===
On 12 January 2022, Opare signed a 1.5-year contract with Seraing.

== International career ==
=== Youth ===
2007 FIFA U-17 World Cup

A converted midfielder and skillful lateral defender, Opare initiated the Black Starlets attacking moves with surging runs and was responsible for supplying the forwards Ransford Osei and Sadick Adams with precise crosses from wide areas. At the back, he looks equally comfortable and composed. He assisted on many of Ghana's goals at the 2007 African Under-17 Championship in Togo in March 2007, as well as in the U-17 World Cup, where he was a standout in all seven matches he played in. Opare was widely regarded as the best defender at the 2007 FIFA U17 World Cup.

2009 FIFA U-20 World Cup

In September 2009, Opare was included in the Ghana national under-20 team (the Black Satellites) for the 2009 U-20 World Cup in Egypt, in which Opare had helped the Ghana team win for the first time by defeating Brazil in the finals at the Cairo International Stadium on 16 October 2009.

=== Senior ===
On 13 November 2007, three weeks after his 17th birthday, he received his first senior International call-up from Ghana's coach, Claude Le Roy for a FIFA international friendly match against Togo at the Ohene Djan Stadium in Accra, Ghana, on 18 November 2007, after another excellent display, assisting twice on a superb hat-trick by Ransford Osei against Togo's U-17 team in a junior international friendly at the same venue on Sunday, 11 November 2007.

2008 African Cup of Nations

The U-17 World Cup star was part of Ghana's squad for the 2008 African Cup of Nations. However, on 10 January 2008, Ghana's team doctor, Martin Engmann, told the media Opare had not recovered from an ankle injury he sustained in the Pre-Tournament Training Camp at the Jebel Ali Hotel Resort and Spa in Dubai, and was excluded from the squad together alongside injured teammates Matthew Amoah and captain Stephen Appiah.

2012 African Cup of Nations

In December 2011, Opare was named to the Ghana's provisional 25-man squad for the 2012 Africa Cup of Nations. In January 2012, he was selected for the tournament's 23-man squad.

Opare was never given an opportunity by the then head coach of Ghana, Goran Stevanović, to feature in any of the six matches the Ghana national team played at the 2012 African Cup of Nations.

2014 FIFA World Cup

On 2 June 2014, Opare was named in Ghana's squad for the 2014 FIFA World Cup. In the team's opening match, he started at right-back against the United States in a 2–1 defeat, however he did not appear in their other two matches as Ghana failed to advance past the group stage.

== Career statistics ==
=== Club ===
As of match played on 18 May 2014.

Appearances and goals by club, season and competition
Club	Season	League			Cup		Continental		Other		Total	
Club	Season	Division	Apps	Goals	Apps	Goals	Apps	Goals	Apps	Goals	Apps	Goals
Ashanti Gold	2006–07	Ghana Premier League	13	4							13	4
CS Sfaxien	2007–08	Tunisian Ligue Professionnelle 1	21	6							21	6
Real Madrid Castilla	2008–09	Segunda División B	5	0	0	0	0	0	0	0	5	0
Real Madrid Castilla	2009–10	Segunda División B	1	0	0	0	0	0	0	0	1	0
Real Madrid Castilla	Total		6	0	0	0	0	0	0	0	6	0
Standard Liège	2010–11	Belgian First Division A	24	0	6	1	0	0	9 (Note: Appearances in Belgian First Division A playoffs)	0	39	1
Standard Liège	2011–12	Belgian First Division A	10	0	2	0	8	0	7 (Note: One appearances in Belgian Super Cup)	0	27	0
Standard Liège	2012–13	Belgian First Division A	4	0	1	0	0	0	9	0	14	0
Standard Liège	2013–14	Belgian First Division A	22	0	1	0	8	0	8	0	39	0
Standard Liège	Total		60	0	10	1	16	0	33	0	119	1
Porto B	2014–15	LigaPro	2	0	–		–		0	0	2	0
Beşiktaş (loan)	2014–15	Süper Lig	6	0	2	0	3	0	0	0	11	0
Career total			108	10	12	1	19	0	33	0	172	11

=== International ===
As of match played on 29 April 2020.

National team	Year	Apps	Goals
Ghana	2011	7	0
Ghana	2012	3	0
Ghana	2013	5	0
Ghana	2014	1	0
Ghana	2015	0	0
Ghana	2016	0	0
Ghana	2017	1	0
Ghana	2018	1	0
Total		18	0

== Honours ==
CS Sfaxien

- CAF Confederation Cup: 2008

Standard Liège

- Belgian Cup: 2011

Ghana U-20

- FIFA U-20 World Cup: 2009
