= Aloys Nong =

Cameroonian footballer (born 1983)

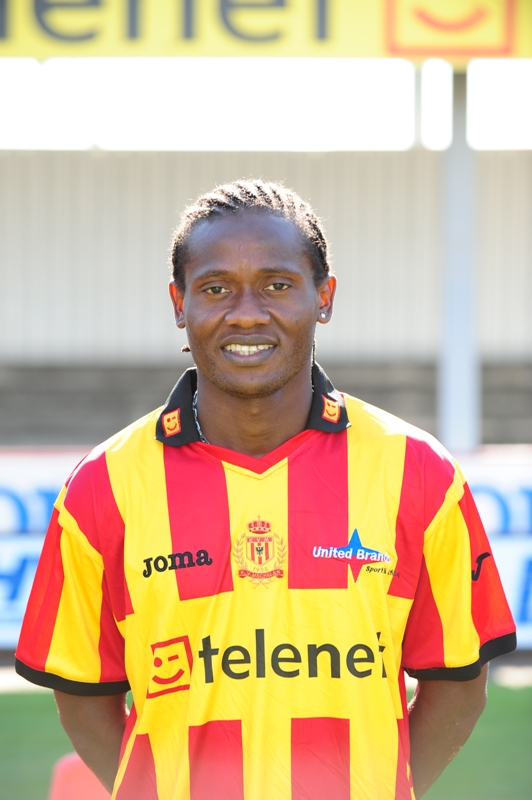

Personal information
- Full name: Aloys Bertrand Nong
- Date of birth: 16 October 1983 (age 43)
- Place of birth: Douala, Cameroon
- Height: 5 ft 10 in (1.78 m)
- Position: Striker

Youth career
- 1999: Kadji Sports Academy
- 2000–2002: Eendracht Aalst

Senior career*
Years	Team	Apps	(Gls)
2002–2004	Visé	27	(14)
2003	→ Royal Liège (loan)	16	(4)
2004–2005	Brussels	30	(2)
2005–2007	Kortrijk	67	(36)
2007–2010	Mechelen	73	(24)
2010–2012	Standard Liège	30	(5)
2012–2013	RAEC Mons	50	(9)
2013–2014	Levante	6	(0)
2014	→ Recreativo (loan)	12	(1)
2014–2015	Foolad	14	(9)
2015–2016	Naft Tehran	12	(4)
2016	Tractor	7	(3)
2017	Esteghlal Khuzestan	12	(2)
2017–2018	Pars Jonoubi Jam	15	(4)
2018–2019	Saipa	3	(0)
Total		374	(117)
- * Club domestic league appearances and goals

Aloys Bertrand Nong (born 16 October 1983) is a Cameroonian footballer.

== Club career ==
Nong was born in Douala. He moved to Belgium in 2000, aged 16, and signed with SC Eendracht Aalst. In the 2002 summer Nong joined C.S. Visé, and after a short loan spell at Royal de Liège he quickly established himself as a starter.

In January 2005, Nong joined KV Kortrijk, after a six-month spell at FC Brussels. After featuring regularly for the side he moved to KV Mechelen in July 2007. This is around the same time he secured a lucrative deal with Geox shoes.

On 31 August 2010 Nong joined Standard Liège for a € 1.25 million fee. In January 2012, however, he rescinded his link and agreed to a three-and-a-half-year deal with RAEC Mons.

On 7 August 2013 Nong signed a three-year deal with La Liga side Levante UD. He made his debut in the competition on 3 November, replacing Rubén García in the 76th minute of a 0–1 home loss against Granada CF.

After appearing rarely with the Valencian side, Nong was loaned to Recreativo de Huelva on 30 January 2014. He returned to the Granotes in June, and rescinded his link on 1 September.

=== Iran ===
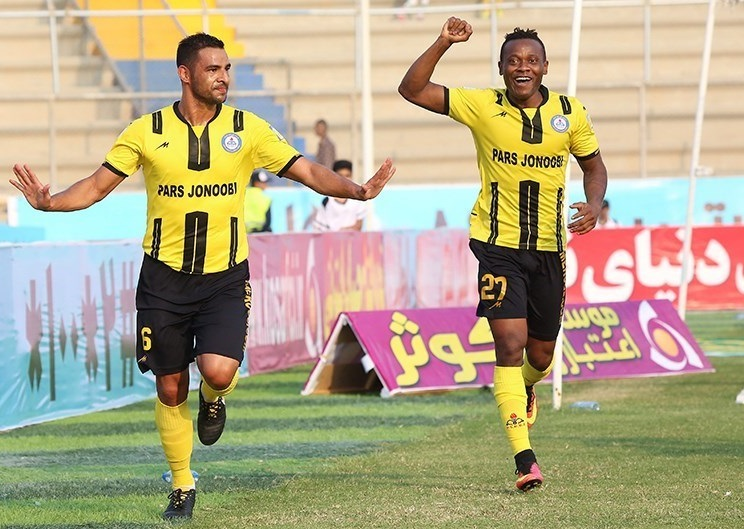
Aloys Nong and Michael Umaña in F.C. Pars Jonoubi.

Nong signed for Iranian club Foolad in the middle of the 2014–2015 season and played in the AFC Champions League with the team. At the end of the season he left the club and signed with Naft Tehran. Nong scored on 21 September 2015 in a 2–1 loss against Esteghlal at the famous Azadi Stadium. He was sold by Naft midway through the season because of financial issues.

Nong joined Tractor for the second half of the 2015–16 season. His contract was not extended and he was released at the end of the season. He spent the first half of the 2016–17 season as a free agent before signing a 6-month contract with Iranian champions Esteghlal Khuzestan on 12 December 2016.

== Career statistics ==
=== Club ===
Appearances and goals by club, season and competition
Club	Season	League			National cup		Continental		Other		Total	
Club	Season	Division	Apps	Goals	Apps	Goals	Apps	Goals	Apps	Goals	Apps	Goals
Brussels	2003–04	Belgian Second Division	16	2	0	0	—		—		16	2
Brussels	2004–05	Belgian First Division	14	0	0	0	—		—		14	0
Brussels	Total		30	2	0	0	—		—		30	2
Kortrijk	2004–05	Belgian Second Division	10	7	—		—		—		10	7
Kortrijk	2005–06	Belgian Second Division	29	12	0	0	—		—		29	12
Kortrijk	2006–07	Belgian Second Division	28	17	3	2	—		—		31	19
Kortrijk	Total		67	36	3	2	—		—		70	38
Mechelen	2007–08	Belgian First Division	30	13	1	0	—		—		31	13
Mechelen	2008–09	Belgian First Division	8	0	3	0	—		—		11	0
Mechelen	2009–10	Belgian Pro League	30	9	5	1	—		—		35	10
Mechelen	2010–11	Belgian Pro League	5	2	—		—		—		5	2
Mechelen	Total		73	24	9	1	—		—		82	25
Standard Liège	2010–11	Belgian Pro League	24	4	2	1	—		—		26	5
Standard Liège	2011–12	Belgian Pro League	6	1	1	2	4	0	1	0	12	3
Standard Liège	Total		30	5	3	3	4	0	1	0	38	8
RAEC Mons	2011–12	Belgian Pro League	16	0	2	1	—		—		18	1
RAEC Mons	2012–13	Belgian Pro League	33	9	1	0	—		—		34	9
RAEC Mons	2013–14	Belgian Pro League	1	0	—		—		—		1	0
RAEC Mons	Total		50	9	3	1	—		—		57	10
Levante	2013–14	La Liga	6	0	6	0	—		—		12	0
Recreativo (loan)	2013–14	Segunda División	12	1	—		—		—		12	1
Foolad	2014–15	Persian Gulf Pro League	14	9	—		6	0	—		20	9
Naft Tehran	2015–16	Persian Gulf Pro League	12	4	2	0	2	0	—		16	4
Tractor	2015–16	Persian Gulf Pro League	7	3	—		6	2	—		13	5
Esteghlal Khuzestan	2016–17	Persian Gulf Pro League	12	2	—		8	3	—		20	5
Pars Jonoubi Jam	2017–18	Persian Gulf Pro League	15	4	1	0	—		—		16	4
Saipa	2017–18	Persian Gulf Pro League	3	0	—		—		—		3	0
Career total			331	99	27	7	26	5	1	0	385	111

== Honours ==
Standard Liège

- Belgian Cup: 2010–11
