= Mohamed Tchité =

Burundian footballer (born 1984)

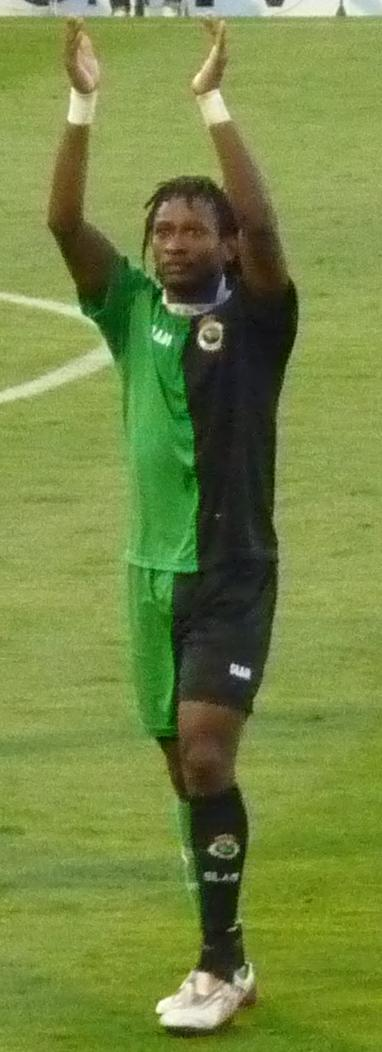
- Tchité after a game with Racing in 2009

Personal information
- Full name: Mohamed Gasana Tchité
- Date of birth: 31 January 1984 (age 42)
- Place of birth: Bujumbura, Burundi
- Height: 1.76 m (5 ft 9 in)
- Position: Striker

Youth career
- 1996–2001: AS Rangers

Senior career*
Years	Team	Apps	(Gls)
2001–2002	Prince Louis		
2002–2003	Mukura Victory		
2003–2006	Standard Liège	58	(21)
2006–2007	Anderlecht	33	(21)
2007–2010	Racing Santander	88	(24)
2010–2012	Standard Liège	52	(23)
2012–2014	Club Brugge	25	(5)
2015	Petrolul Ploiești	11	(0)
2015–2016	Sint-Truiden	12	(1)
2016–2017	White Star Bruxelles	17	(2)
Total		296	(97)

International career
2001	Burundi U20		
- * Club domestic league appearances and goals

Mohamed Gasana Tchité (born 31 January 1984) is a Burundian–Belgian former professional footballer who played as a striker. He spent most of his professional career in Belgium, with Standard Liége, Anderlecht, Club Brugge, Sint-Truiden and White Star Bruxelles, and in Spain with Racing de Santander.

== Club career ==
Tchité was born and brought up in Bujumbura, the largest city and capital of Burundi, but his parents hailed from neighbouring Rwanda and the Democratic Republic of the Congo. He started his footballing career with local AS Rangers FC – later named Dragon Super Rangers FC Nyakabiga. He joined Prince Louis FC in 2001, winning the Burundi Premier League and the Revelation Footballer of the Year award, and also being the finalist in the Kagame Inter-Club Cup; in 2002 he left for Mukura Victory Sports in Rwanda, where he would be noticed by scouts from Belgium's Standard Liège.

In 2003, Tchité arrived in Liège, where he became a regular member of the first team, scoring 21 goals in 58 matches during his three years with the club. In 2005–06 season, he netted 16 times in the Belgian First Division A to help his team finish as runners-up to Anderlecht, and that tally put him second in the goalscoring list behind only Tosin Dosunmu of Germinal Beerschot; at the end of the following campaign, he was named Belgium's Professional Footballer of the Year, also being the recipient of the Belgian Ebony Shoe.

On 31 August 2007, the last day of the summer transfer period, Racing de Santander announced the signing of Tchité in order to replace Valencia CF-bound Nikola Žigić. In the 11 November match against Deportivo de La Coruña, he scored the only goal in a 1–0 road win, repeating the feat on 24 February 2008, against Almeria (home fixture); he netted four times in his first twenty La Liga matches, finishing the season at seven, squad best.

On 1 November 2008, Tchité scored a hat-trick against Valencia at the Mestalla Stadium, in a 4–2 win that signified the Che side's first defeat in 2008–09. He appeared significantly less in his second year, but managed to score the same number of goals, adding one in the UEFA Cup, the 1–1 home draw against Schalke 04.

Tchité struggled initially in the 2009–10 season, even though he started most of the games. However, in two consecutive matches in April 2010, he netted braces for Racing at home against Espanyol (3–1) and at Xerez (2–2) – three penalties; on 16 May, he added two in a 2–0 home win over Sporting de Gijón, taking his league tally to 11 as the Cantabrians certified their permanence in the top flight for a further year.

In the last hours of the 2010 August transfer window, Tchité returned to former club Standard Liège, on a three-year contract. In July 2012 he changed teams again, signing with Club Brugge for an estimated fee of €1.5 million and becoming the first player to wear the jerseys of Standard, Anderlecht and Brugge. Less than six months after his arrival, Georges Leekens was sacked and he did not seem to enter the plans of the new coach Juan Carlos Garrido, who was himself fired in September 2013, making way for Michel Preud'homme who also did not feature the player regularly, and the latter eventually became a free agent.

In February 2015, ex-Standard manager Mircea Rednic convinced 31-year-old Tchité to sign for Petrolul Ploiești until the end of the season. He made his debut on 5 March in the first leg of the Cupa României semi-final against Steaua București, scoring his team's goal in a 1–1 home draw.

== International career ==
Despite his African roots, Tchité announced his desire to play for Belgium once he obtained his citizenship having played for Standard Liège for over two years. He officially became a Belgian citizen on 11 July 2008.

National team coach René Vandereycken called up Tchité for the 2010 FIFA World Cup qualifying campaign, but FIFA intervened and ruled the player ineligible because he had previously represented Burundi at senior level in the CECAFA Cup in 2000, also having appeared for the nation at under-20 level and having changed international allegiances to Rwanda when he moved to Mukura Victory Sports in 2002, even though he never played for the Rwandan national side, which meant he remained eligible for the latter according to the main governing body's regulations.

== Honours ==
Prince Louis

- Burundi Premier League: 2001

Standard Liège

- Belgian Cup: 2010–11

Anderlecht

- Belgian Pro League: 2006–07
- Belgian Supercup: 2006, 2007

Individual

- Burundian Revelation Footballer of the Year: 2001
- Belgian Footballer of the Year: 2006–07
- Belgian Ebony Shoe: 2007
