= 2007–08 Standard Liège season =

Standard Liège
2007–08 season
- Manager: Michel Preud'homme
- First Division: 1st
- UEFA Cup: First round
- Belgian Cup: Semi-final
- Top goalscorer: Milan Jovanović (16)

Standard Liège lost one match all league season, winning the Belgian First Division for the ninth time in club history. The season marked the breakthrough of teenage midfield duo Marouane Fellaini and Steven Defour, while strikers Milan Jovanović and Dieumerci Mbokani were right up there in terms of the top scoring charts of the domestic top division. The UEFA Cup run ended early, being knocked out to eventual winners Zenit Saint Petersburg in the last qualifying round.

== Squad ==
=== Goalkeepers ===
- (Belgium) Olivier Renard
- (Belgium) Jérémy De Vriendt
- (Ecuador) Rorys Aragón

=== Defenders ===
- (Guadeloupe) (France) Thomas Phibel
- (Senegal) Mohamed Sarr
- (Belgium) Frédéric Dupré
- (United States) (Belgium) Oguchi Onyewu
- (Belgium) Eric Deflandre
- (Brazil) Fred
- (Democratic Republic of the Congo) (Belgium) Landry Mulemo
- (Belgium) Marco Ingrao
- (Brazil) Dante

=== Midfielders ===
- (Belgium) Réginal Goreux
- (Belgium) Grégory Dufer
- (Belgium) Jonathan Walasiak
- (Belgium) Axel Witsel
- (Belgium) Steven Defour (C)
- (Israel) Salim Tuama
- (France) Siramana Dembélé
- (Belgium) Marouane Fellaini
- (Belgium) Vittorio Villano
- (Belgium) Yanis Papassarantis

=== Attackers ===
- (Serbia) Milan Jovanović
- Jordan ayman
- (Democratic Republic of the Congo) Dieumerci Mbokani
- (Brazil) Igor de Camargo

== First Division ==
=== Matches ===
1	Zulte Waregem	1–4	Standard Liège
	Jelavić 34'		Fellaini 38'; Onyewu 48'; De Camargo 50'; Witsel 83'

2	Standard Liège	4–1	Brussels
	Jovanović 11', 34', 74'; Fellaini 70'		Culek 59'

3	Standard Liège	4–1	Cercle Brugge
	Mbokani 2', 44'; Fellaini 24'; Witsel 56'		Iachtchouk 37'

4	Roeselare	0–4	Standard Liège
			Jovanović 12', 27', 71'; Mbokani 67'

5	Standard Liège	2–1	Club Brugge
	Jovanović 64'; Mbokani 69'		Vermant 65'

6	Gent	1–1	Standard Liège
	Thijs 70'		De Camargo 44'

7	Standard Liège	2–1	Westerlo
	Tuama 1', 78'		Dirar 19'

8	Sint-Truiden	0–0	Standard Liège

9	Standard Liège	3–1	Germinal Beerschot
	Fellaini 28'; De Camargo 35'; Witsel 43'		Dosunmu 20'

10	Mons	1–1	Standard Liège
	Zoko 87'		De Camargo 48'

11	Standard Liège	2–2	Mechelen
	Defour 30'; Mbokani 51'		Persoons 4', 50'

12	Excelsior Mouscron	0–0	Standard Liège

13	Standard Liège	1–0	Lokeren
	De Camargo 24'

14	Anderlecht	0–0	Standard Liège

15	Standard Liège	5–1	Charleroi
	Witsel 23' (pen.); De Camargo 28', 57'; Camozzato 36'; Jovanović 49'		Mujangi Bia 66'

16	Dender	0–0	Standard Liège

17	Standard Liège	3–1	Genk
	Dufer 19'; Witsel 46'; Jovanović 48'		Vossen 68'

18	Standard Liège	3–1	Zulte Waregem
	Dante 24'; Witsel 59'; Mbokani 67'		Leye 44'

19	Brussels	0–1	Standard Liège
			Mbokani 35'

20	Cercle Brugge	0–0	Standard Liège

21	Standard Liège	0–0	Roeselare

22	Club Brugge	1–2	Standard Liège
	Sonck 88'		Jovanović 48', 66'

23	Standard Liège	0–0	Gent

24	Westerlo	1–3	Standard Liège
	Van Den Eede 5'		Fellaini 66'; Mbokani 79'; Witsel 84'

25	Standard Liège	2–1	Sint-Truiden
	Mbokani 32'; De Camargo 45'		Peeters 43'

26	Germinal Beerschot	1–2	Standard Liège
	Losada 62'		Jovanović 15'; Fellaini 41'

27	Standard Liège	2–0	Mons
	Mbokani 53'; Goreux 79'

28	Mechelen	0–1	Standard Liège
			Jovanović 78'

29	Standard Liège	1–0	Excelsior Mouscron
	Onyewu 86'

30	Lokeren	0–0	Standard Liège

31	Standard Liège	2–0	Anderlecht
	Mbokani 54', 77'

32	Charleroi	2–1	Standard Liège
	Chakouri 37'; Kéré 66'		Jovanović 44' (pen.)

33	Standard Liège	3–0	Dender
	Mbokani 37', 83'; Jovanović 43'

34	Genk	0–2	Standard Liège
			Mbokani 27'; Jovanović 85'

=== Top scorers ===
- (Serbia) Milan Jovanović – 16
- (Democratic Republic of the Congo) Dieumerci Mbokani – 15
- (Belgium) Marouane Fellaini – 7
- (Brazil) Igor de Camargo – 7

== Sources ==
- "Standard de Liège". Soccerway. Archived from the original on February 8, 2013.
