= 2008–09 Standard Liège season =

Standard Liège
2008–09 season
- Manager: László Bölöni
- First Division: 1st (champions)
- Champions League: Final qualifying round
- Belgian Cup: Round of 32
- UEFA Cup: Round of 32
- Top goalscorer: Dieumerci Mbokani (16)

Standard Liège won their tenth ever league title thanks to a playoff victory against Anderlecht. They finished on the same point as them with the same number of games won. Following 1-1 away from home in Brussels, Standard won 1-0 at home thanks to a penalty scored by Axel Witsel.

The season also saw the club nearly qualifying for the Champions League, following two 0-0 draws against Liverpool. In the extra time, however, Dirk Kuyt scored a decisive late goal. In the UEFA Cup, where Standard dropped down to, they beat Everton in the qualifying phase, which caused Everton to pay £15 million for playmaker Marouane Fellaini, the highest ever fee paid for a Belgian player. In the UEFA Cup proper, Standard reached the Round of 32, where they were knocked out of the competition by Braga of Portugal.

== Squad ==
=== Goalkeepers ===
- (Belgium) Anthony Moris
- (Turkey) (Belgium) Sinan Bolat
- (Ecuador) Rorys Aragón

=== Defenders ===
- (Brazil) Dante
- (Guadeloupe) (France) Thomas Phibel
- (Belgium) (Brazil) Alexandre Jansen Da Silva
- (Senegal) (Belgium) Mohamed Sarr
- (Brazil) Digão
- (United States) (Belgium) Oguchi Onyewu
- (Croatia) Tomislav Mikulić
- (Brazil) (Italy) Marcos Camozzato
- (Democratic Republic of the Congo) (Belgium) Landry Mulemo
- (Belgium) Marco Ingrao
- (France) Eliaquim Mangala

=== Midfielders ===
- (Belgium) Réginal Goreux
- (France) Wilfried Dalmat
- (Belgium) Jonathan Walasiak
- (Belgium) Axel Witsel
- (Belgium) Steven Defour (C)
- (Israel) Salim Tuama
- (France) Benjamin Nicaise
- (Belgium) Marouane Fellaini
- (Morocco) (Belgium) Mehdi Carcela

=== Attackers ===
- (Serbia) Milan Jovanović
- (Ivory Coast) Cyriac
- (Democratic Republic of the Congo) Dieumerci Mbokani
- (Brazil) Igor de Camargo
- (Croatia) Leon Benko
- (Jordan) Ayman

== Sources ==
- "Belgium - Standard de Liège (for results)". Soccerway. Archived from the original on February 8, 2013.
