= 2008 Belgian Super Cup =

Standard Liège	Anderlecht
3	1
- Date: 9 August 2008
- Venue: Stade Maurice Dufrasne, Liège
- Referee: Paul Allaerts

The 2008 Belgian Super Cup was a football match played between 2007–08 Belgian First Division winners Standard Liège and 2007–08 Belgian Cup winners Anderlecht. Standard won 3–1, denying Anderlecht a third-straight Super Cup win.

== Match details ==
2008-08-09

Standard Liège	3–1	Anderlecht
Onyewu 12', 18'; Nicaise 87'		Suárez 73' (pen.)

Stade Maurice Dufrasne, Liège
Attendance: 28,000
Referee: Paul Allaerts

Standard	Anderlecht

STANDARD LIÈGE:
GK	1	(Ecuador) Rorys Aragón
DF	4	(Brazil) Dante
DF	5	(United States) Oguchi Onyewu
DF	19	(Senegal) Mohamed Sarr		(substituted off) 86'
MF	17	(Brazil) Marcos
MF	28	(Belgium) Axel Witsel
MF	8	(Belgium) Steven Defour (c)		(substituted off) 90'
MF	6	(France) Wilfried Dalmat		(substituted off) 84'
MF	11	(Israel) Salim Tuama		(substituted off) 83'
FW	10	(Brazil) Igor de Camargo		(substituted off) 90'
FW	23	(Serbia) Milan Jovanović		(substituted off) 75'
Substitutes:
MF	15	(Croatia) Tomislav Mikulić		(substituted on) 86'
MF	30	(France) Siramana Dembélé		(substituted on) 90'
DF	2	(Belgium) Réginal Goreux	(red card) 95'	(substituted on) 84'
DF	29	(Belgium) Marco Ingrao		(substituted on) 83'
FW	21	(Belgium) Edouard Kabamba		(substituted on) 90'
MF	26	(France) Benjamin Nicaise		(substituted on) 75'
Manager:
(Romania) László Bölöni

RSC ANDERLECHT:
GK	24	(Belgium) Silvio Proto
DF	3	(Belgium) Olivier Deschacht
DF	23	(Hungary) Roland Juhász	Booked
DF	14	(Belgium) Bart Goor (c)
MF	30	(Belgium) Guillaume Gillet
MF	5	(Argentina) Lucas Biglia		(substituted off) 46'
MF	17	(Argentina) Hernán Losada	Booked	(substituted off) 64'
MF	8	(Czech Republic) Jan Polák		(substituted off) 78'
MF	11	(Morocco) Mbark Boussoufa		(substituted off) 74'
FW	9	(Argentina) Matías Suárez	Booked
FW	7	(Czech Republic) Stanislav Vlček		(substituted off) 46'
Substitutes:
GK	1	(Czech Republic) Daniel Zítka
MF	13	(Belgium) Jonathan Legear		(substituted on) 64'
MF	99	(Ivory Coast) Bakary Saré		(substituted on) 46'
DF	44	(Serbia) Nemanja Rnić		(substituted on) 78'
FW	21	(Belgium) Roland Lamah		(substituted on) 74'
FW	10	(Brazil) Kanu		(substituted on) 46'
Manager:
(Belgium) Ariel Jacobs

== See also ==
- 2008–09 Belgian First Division
- 2008–09 Belgian Cup
