= Dieumerci Mbokani =

Congolese footballer (born 1985)

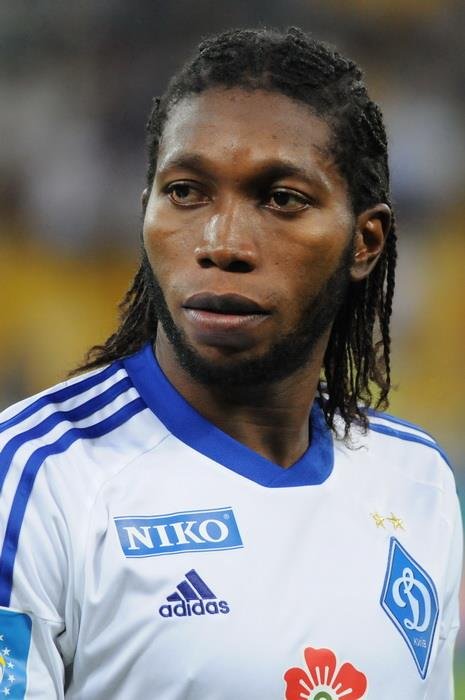
- Mbokani with Dynamo Kyiv in 2013

Personal information
- Full name: Dieudonné Mbokani Bezua
- Date of birth: 22 November 1985 (age 40)
- Place of birth: Kinshasa, Zaire
- Height: 1.85 m (6 ft 1 in)
- Position: Striker

Senior career*
Years	Team	Apps	(Gls)
2004	Bel'Or	23	(16)
2005–2007	TP Mazembe	72	(67)
2006–2007	→ Anderlecht (loan)	9	(4)
2007–2010	Standard Liège	87	(39)
2010–2011	Monaco	10	(1)
2011	→ VfL Wolfsburg (loan)	7	(0)
2011–2013	Anderlecht	53	(33)
2013–2018	Dynamo Kyiv	54	(25)
2015–2016	→ Norwich City (loan)	29	(7)
2016–2017	→ Hull City (loan)	12	(0)
2018–2021	Antwerp	91	(43)
2021–2022	Kuwait SC	3	(3)
2022–2023	Beveren	23	(14)
2023–2024	Noah	10	(2)
Total		483	(254)

International career
2005–2022	DR Congo	49	(22)
- * Club domestic league appearances and goals

Dieudonné "Dieumerci" Mbokani Bezua (born 22 November 1985) is a Congolese professional footballer who plays as a striker. He was captain and is the all-time top goalscorer of the DR Congo national football team.

He has previously played for TP Mazembe, Anderlecht, VfL Wolfsburg, Monaco, Standard Liège, Norwich City, Hull City, Dynamo Kyiv, Al-Kuwait and Beveren.

== Club career ==
Mbokani began his career at local side Bel'or and was a league topscorer in the 2004 season with 16 goals. Then he moved to TP Mazembe.

In the 2006–07 season, he made nine appearances for Anderlecht and scored four goals, including a hat-trick against Beveren on 7 May 2007. In 2007, he joined Standard de Liège and scored 35 goals in 81 league appearances.

On 30 July 2010, Mbokani signed a deal with French side AS Monaco, after spurning reported interest from Liverpool, for a fee in the region of €7 million.

After failing to impress in Ligue 1, on 9 August 2011, he signed a contract with Anderlecht for a reported fee of €3 million, stating that he looked forward to playing together again with his friend Milan Jovanović. The start of his spell at Anderlecht was dramatic, first injuring himself during one of his first training sessions, meaning he would be sidelined for at least two months. On 21 June 2013, Mbokani officially signed a contract with the Ukrainian club FC Dynamo Kyiv. On 14 July 2013, he scored his first goal in the very first game of the Ukrainian Premier League against Volyn Lutsk during the first half, which ended 1–1.

On 31 August 2015, Mbokani was loaned out to English club Norwich City.

On 31 August 2016, Mbokani was loaned out to English club Hull City. Mbokani made his debut on 17 September 2016 when he came off the bench, after 77-minutes, as a replacement for Abel Hernández in a 4–1 loss at home to Arsenal.

On 20 June 2017, Mbokani was close to completing a transfer to Greek powerhouse Olympiacos but the deal did not ultimately go ahead as the player failed his medical.

In August 2018 he signed a one-year contract with Belgian club Royal Antwerp. He extended his contract with the club in June 2019.

On 14 August 2023, Armenian Premier League Noah announced the signing of Mbokani.

== International career ==
Mbokani represented the DR Congo at the Africa Cup of Nations in 2013 and 2015, helping them to third place at the latter tournament.

Mbokani was caught up in the 2016 Brussels bombings, alongside his international teammate Cédric Bakambu. Though both escaped unscathed, Mbokani was reportedly left "shaken". In the aftermath of this, after being sanctioned for missing a game as a result, he retired from international football with 31 caps. However, he returned to DR Congo's squad for the 2017 Cup of Nations in Gabon, and he was recalled to the national team in March 2019, although he withdrew due to injury.

== Personal life ==
Mbokani was born in Kinshasa in the Democratic Republic of the Congo, then called Zaire. The name "Dieumerci" means "Thank God" in French.

In August 2011, his five-month-old son, David Mbokani, died of a cardiac arrest in his sleep.

== Career statistics ==
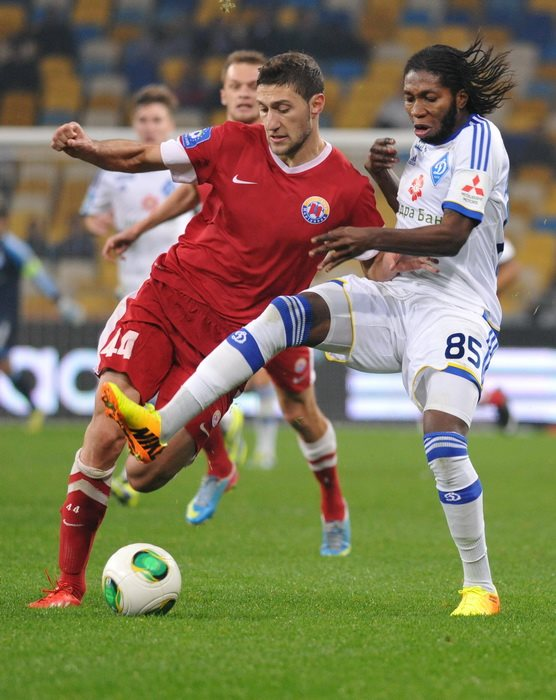
Mbokani (right) playing for Dynamo Kyiv in 2014

=== Club ===
As of 29 November 2023

Appearances and goals by club, season and competition
Club	Season	League			National cup (Note: Includes Belgian Cup, Coupe de France, Ukrainian Cup, FA Cup, Kuwait Emir Cup, Kuwait Crown Prince Cup)		League cup (Note: Includes Coupe de la Ligue, EFL Cup)		Continental		Other		Total	
Club	Season	Division	Apps	Goals	Apps	Goals	Apps	Goals	Apps	Goals	Apps	Goals	Apps	Goals
Anderlecht (loan)	2006–07	Belgian First Division	9	4	0	0	—		—		—		9	4
Standard Liège	2007–08	Belgian First Division	32	15	0	0	—		—		—		32	15
Standard Liège	2008–09	Belgian First Division	31	17	0	0	—		10 (Note: Appearances in UEFA Cup)	3	—		41	20
Standard Liège	2009–10	Belgian Pro League	24	7	1	0	—		12	3	1 (Note: Appearance in Belgian Super Cup)	0	38	10
Standard Liège	Total		87	39	1	0	0	0	22	6	1	0	111	45
Monaco	2010–11	Ligue 1	10	1	0	0	1	0	—		—		11	1
VfL Wolfsburg (loan)	2010–11	Bundesliga	7	0	0	0	—		—		—		7	0
Anderlecht	2011–12	Belgian Pro League	26	14	0	0	—		5 (Note: Appearances in UEFA Europa League)	1	—		31	15
Anderlecht	2012–13	Belgian Pro League	27	19	2	1	—		8 (Note: Appearances in UEFA Champions League)	6	1	1	38	27
Anderlecht	Total		53	33	2	1	0	0	13	7	1	1	69	42
Dynamo Kyiv	2013–14	Ukrainian Premier League	25	13	2	1	—		6	2	—		33	16
Dynamo Kyiv	2014–15	Ukrainian Premier League	8	3	1	0	—		3	0	1 (Note: Appearance in Ukrainian Super Cup)	0	13	3
Dynamo Kyiv	2017–18	Ukrainian Premier League	21	9	2	0	—		7 (Note: Two appearances and one goal in UEFA Champions League, four appearances and two goals in UEFA Europa League)	3	1	0	31	12
Dynamo Kyiv	Total		54	25	5	1	0	0	16	5	2	0	77	31
Norwich City (loan)	2015–16	Premier League	29	7	0	0	1	0	—		—		30	7
Hull City (loan)	2016–17	Premier League	12	0	0	0	2	0	—		—		14	0
Antwerp	2018–19	Belgian Pro League	32	13	1	1	—		—		—		33	14
Antwerp	2019–20	Belgian Pro League	28	18	5	5	—		4	1	—		37	24
Antwerp	2020–21	Belgian Pro League	32	14	0	0	—		3	0	—		35	14
Antwerp	Total		92	45	6	6	0	0	7	1	0	0	105	52
Kuwait	2021–22	Kuwait Premier League	3	3	2	2	1	1	–		–		6	6
Beveren	2022–23	Challenger Pro League	23	14	1	2	–		–		–		24	16
Noah	2023–24	Armenian Premier League	10	2	0	0	–		–		–		10	2
Career total			389	173	17	12	5	1	58	19	4	1	473	206

=== International ===
Scores and results list DR Congo's goal tally first, score column indicates score after each Mbokani goal.

List of international goals scored by Dieumerci Mbokani
No.	Date	Venue	Opponent	Score	Result	Competition
1	16 November 2005	Stade Sébastien Charléty, Paris, France	Libya		1–2	Friendly
2	12 May 2006	Estadio Azteca, Mexico City, Mexico	Mexico	1–2	1–2	Friendly
3	26 March 2008	Stade Maurice Bacquet, Gonfreville-l'Orcher, France	Algeria	1–0	1–1	Friendly
4	13 June 2008	El Hadj Hassan Gouled Aptidon Stadium, Djibouti City, Djibouti	Djibouti	1–0	6–0	2010 FIFA World Cup qualification
5	13 June 2008	El Hadj Hassan Gouled Aptidon Stadium, Djibouti City, Djibouti	Djibouti	4–0	6–0	2010 FIFA World Cup qualification
6	22 June 2008	Stade des Martyrs, Kinshasa, Democratic Republic of the Congo	Djibouti	5–0	5–1	2010 FIFA World Cup qualification
7	10 June 2012	Stade des Martyrs, Kinshasa, Democratic Republic of the Congo	Togo	2–0	2–0	2014 FIFA World Cup qualification
8	17 June 2012	Stade des Martyrs, Kinshasa, Democratic Republic of the Congo	Seychelles	1–0	3–0	2013 Africa Cup of Nations qualification
9	9 September 2012	Stade des Martyrs, Kinshasa, Democratic Republic of the Congo	Equatorial Guinea	1–0	4–0	2013 Africa Cup of Nations qualification
10	9 September 2012	Stade des Martyrs, Kinshasa, Democratic Republic of the Congo	Equatorial Guinea	4–0	4–0	2013 Africa Cup of Nations qualification
11	20 January 2013	Nelson Mandela Bay Stadium, Port Elizabeth, South Africa	Ghana	2–2	2–2	2013 Africa Cup of Nations
12	28 January 2013	Moses Mabhida Stadium, Durban, South Africa	Mali	1–0	1–1	2013 Africa Cup of Nations
13	31 January 2015	Estadio de Bata, Bata, Equatorial Guinea	Congo	1–2	4–2	2015 Africa Cup of Nations
14	31 January 2015	Estadio de Bata, Bata, Equatorial Guinea	Congo	4–2	4–2	2015 Africa Cup of Nations
15	4 February 2015	Estadio de Bata, Bata, Equatorial Guinea	Ivory Coast	1–1	1–3	2015 Africa Cup of Nations
16	18 October 2015	Stade de la Cité de l'Oie, Visé, Belgium	Nigeria	1–0	2–0	Friendly
17	8 October 2016	Stade des Martyrs, Kinshasa, Democratic Republic of the Congo	Libya	1–0	4–0	2018 FIFA World Cup qualification
18	8 October 2016	Stade des Martyrs, Kinshasa, Democratic Republic of the Congo	Libya	3–0	4–0	2018 FIFA World Cup qualification
19	2 September 2021	Stade TP Mazembe, Lubumbashi, Democratic Republic of the Congo	Tanzania	1–0	1–1	2022 FIFA World Cup qualification
20	6 September 2021	Stade de l'Amitié, Cotonou, Benin	Benin	1–0	1–1	2022 FIFA World Cup qualification
21	7 October 2021	Stade des Martyrs, Kinshasa, Democratic Republic of the Congo	Madagascar	2–0	2–0	2022 FIFA World Cup qualification
22	14 November 2021	Stade des Martyrs, Kinshasa, Democratic Republic of the Congo	Benin	1–0	2–0	2022 FIFA World Cup qualification

== Honours ==
Anderlecht

- Belgian First Division: 2006–07, 2011–12, 2012–13
- Belgian Super Cup: 2012

Standard Liège

- Belgian First Division: 2007–08, 2008–09
- Belgian Super Cup: 2009

Dynamo Kiev

- Ukrainian Premier League: 2014–15
- Ukrainian Cup: 2013–14, 2014–15

Royal Antwerp

- Belgian Cup: 2019–20

Kuwait SC

- Kuwaiti Premier League: 2021–22

DR Congo

- Africa Cup of Nations bronze: 2015

Individual

- Belgian Golden Shoe: 2012
- Ebony Shoe: 2012, 2020
- Africa Cup of Nations top scorer: 2015
- Belgian First Division A Top Scorer: 2019–20
- DH The Best Standard Liège Team Ever: 2020
