= Siramana Dembélé =

French footballer (born 1977)

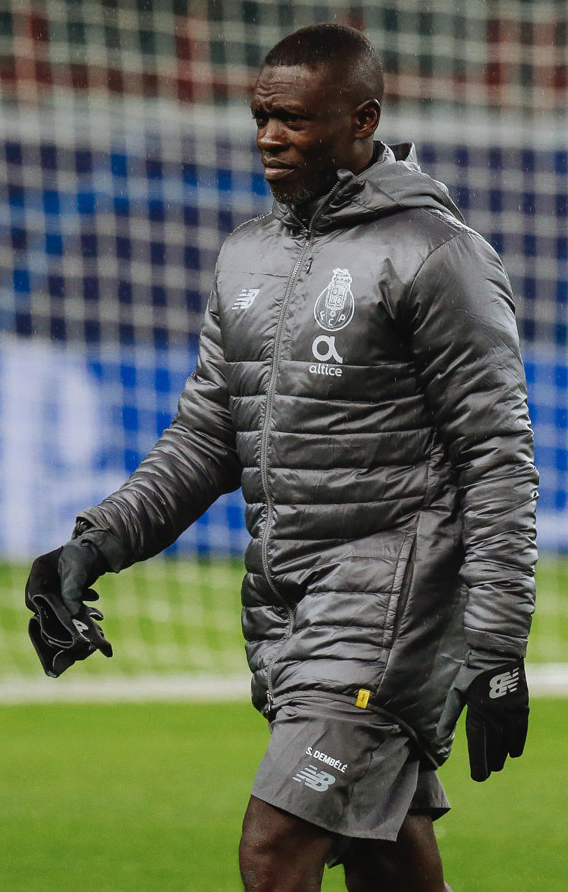
- Dembélé with Porto in 2018

Personal information
- Full name: Siramana Dembélé
- Date of birth: 27 January 1977 (age 49)
- Place of birth: Paris, France
- Height: 1.70 m (5 ft 7 in)
- Position: Defensive midfielder

Team information
- Current team: AC Milan (assistant coach)

Youth career
- –1998: Les Lilas

Senior career*
Years	Team	Apps	(Gls)
1998–2002	Les Lilas	–	(–)
2002–2003	Olympique Alès	27	(2)
2003–2004	Cannes	33	(2)
2004–2005	Nîmes	36	(0)
2005–2006	Vitória Setúbal	13	(0)
2006–2009	Standard Liège	49	(0)
2008–2009	→ Maccabi Petah Tikva (loan)	27	(0)

Managerial career
- 2010–2011: Standard Liège (assistant)
- 2012–2013: Olhanense (assistant)
- 2013–2014: Académica (assistant)
- 2014–2015: Braga (assistant)
- 2016–2017: Nantes (assistant)
- 2024–: AC Milan (assistant)
- * Club domestic league appearances and goals

Siramana Dembélé (born 27 January 1977) is a French former footballer and current assistant coach of Serie A club AC Milan.

In the summer of 2005, Dembélé joined Portuguese side Vitória Setúbal from Nîmes, in which he would play for the Sadinos until January 2006, before completing a move to Belgian side Standard Liège.

== Honours (as player) ==
Standard Liège

- Belgian Pro League: 2007–08, 2008–09
- Belgian Super Cup: 2008

== Honours (as assistant coach) ==
Standard Liège

- Belgian Cup: 2010–11

Porto

- Primeira Liga: 2017–18, 2019–20, 2021–22
- Taça de Portugal: 2019–20, 2021–22, 2022–23, 2023–24
- Taça da Liga: 2022–23
- Supertaça Cândido de Oliveira: 2018, 2020, 2022
