= Réginal Goreux =

Haitian footballer (born 1987)

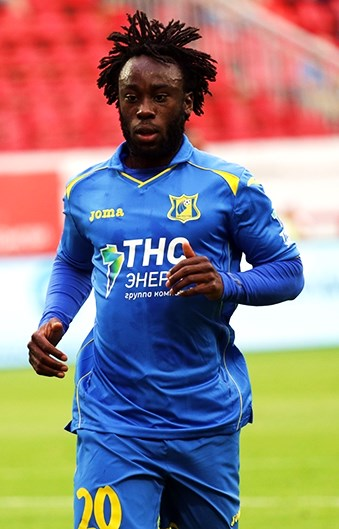
- Playing for FC Rostov in 2014

Personal information
- Date of birth: 31 December 1987 (age 38)
- Place of birth: Saint-Michel, Haiti
- Height: 1.75 m (5 ft 9 in)
- Position: Defender

Team information
- Current team: Standard Liège (academy coach)

Youth career
- –2000: Berloz FC
- 2000–2008: Standard Liège

Senior career*
| Years | Team | Apps | (Gls) |
| 2008–2013 | Standard Liège | 103 | (5) |
| 2013–2014 | Krylia Sovetov | 38 | (3) |
| 2014–2015 | FC Rostov | 14 | (0) |
| 2015–2020 | Standard Liège | 41 | (1) |
| Total | | 219 | (11) |

International career
| 2007–2008 | Belgium U21 | 5 | (0) |
| 2011–2017 | Haiti | 29 | (2) |

Managerial career
- 2020–: Standard Liège (academy)
- 2023–2024: SL16 FC (caretaker)
- * Club domestic league appearances and goals

Réginal Goreux (born 31 December 1987) is a Haitian professional football coach and a former player. He is the youth team coach for Standard Liège. He played as a defender or midfielder. He also holds Belgian nationality.

== Club career ==
=== Standard Liège ===
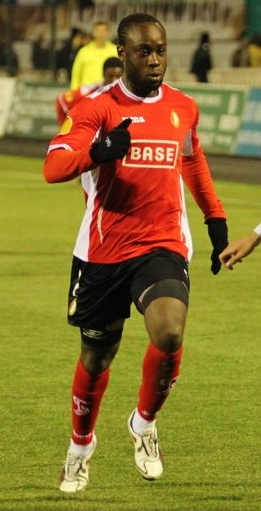
Goreux playing for Standard Liège in his first spell at the club.

Goreux started his football career before moving to Standard Liège when he was eight. In March 2005, while at the youth system at Standard Liège, Goreux suffered an injury that resulted in him sidelined for almost two years, almost threatened his football career. Having progressed through the youth system at Standard Liège, Goreux was promoted to the club's first team squad in November 2007.

It wasn't until on 30 January 2008 when he made his Standard Liège debut, coming on as a 72nd-minute substitute, in a 4–1 loss against Cercle Brugge in the quarter–final first leg of the Belgian Cup. Goreux then made his league debut for the club, coming on as a late substitute, in a 0–0 draw against Gent on 23 February 2008. In the quarter–final second leg of the Belgian Cup against Cercle Brugge, he scored the club's third goal of the game, in a 4–0 win to ensure Standard Liège's qualification to the next round. In a follow–up match against Westerlo, Goreux set up the club's second goal of the game, in a 3–1 win. In the matches afterwards, he was mostly given a place in the starting eleven. Goreux scored his first league goal, in a 2–0 win against Mons on 23 March 2008. He later helped the club win the league after beating Anderlecht on 20 April 2008. At the end of the 2007–08 season, Goreux went on to make sixteen appearances and scoring two times in all competitions.

At the start of the 2008–09 season, Goreux made his first appearance of the season in a Belgian Super Cup match against Anderlecht, coming on as a late substitute in the 84th minute, but was sent–off in stoppage time, as Standard Liège won 3–1. However, he appeared on the substitute bench in a number of matches for the side. As a result, Goreux did receive playing time for the side. He made his UEFA Cup debut against Partizan, starting a match and played 71 minutes before being substituted, in a 1–0 win. In a follow–up UEFA Cup match against Sampdoria, Goreux set up a goal for Milan Jovanović, in a 3–0 win. As the 2008–09 season progressed, he continued to fight for his first team place. It wasn't until on 1 March 2009 when Goreux scored his first goal of the season, in a 4–0 win against Cercle Brugge. He later played in playoff, coming on as a late substitute, in a 1–0 win in the second leg; which Standard Liège won the playoff by 2–1 on aggregate and thereby retained the title. At the end of the 2008–09 season, Goreux went on to make twenty–nine appearances and scoring once in all competitions.

At the start of the 2009–10 season, Goreux continued to have his first team opportunities limited, appearing on the substitute bench. It wasn't until on 16 September 2009 when he made his first appearance of the season, coming on as an 82nd-minute substitute, in a 3–2 loss against Arsenal in the UEFA Champions League match. Ten days later on 26 September 2009, Goreux made his first start of the season, helping the side win 2–0 against K.V. Kortrijk. He continued to feature in and out of the first team for the side later in the 2009=10 season. At one point during a match against Sint-Truidense on 29 November 2010, which Standard Liège lost 2–0. Goreux made a tackle on Wim Mennes and was booked as a result. As a result, this led to reviews on whether he would face disciplinary action for the tackle. It wasn't until on 12 January 2010 that Goreux was recommended a four match suspension by the Royal Belgian Football Association. But the club appealed for his suspension. Amid to his suspension appeal, he suffered an injury that saw him miss two matches. Eventually, Goreux was suspended for three matches, which took effect from 14 March 2010. After serving a three match suspension, he made his return to the starting line-up against Genk on 4 April 2010. Following this, Goreux was featured in the first team for the league's play–off qualification of the UEFA Europa League, which the club was unsuccessful. At the end of the 2009–10 season, he went on to make nineteen appearances in all competitions.

At the start of the 2010–11 season, Goreux didn't appear in the starting line-up for the first four league matches of the season. It wasn't until on 28 August 2010 when he made his first appearance of the season, starting and played 67 minutes before being substituted, in a 1–0 win against K.V. Kortrijk. Following this, Goreux featured for the next four matches before being sent–off for a second bookable offence, in a 2–1 win against Westerlo on 25 September 2010. However, he was plagued with abductor injury that kept him out for two months. It wasn't until on 17 December 2010 when Goreux made his return to the first team against K.V. Kortrijk, coming on as a 77th-minute substitute, in a 2–1 loss. Since returning, he regained his first team place for the side for the rest of the 2010–11 season. It wasn't until on 29 January 2011 when Goreux scored his first goal of the season, in a 2–1 win. In a follow–up match against Eupen, he assisted a goal, resulting an own goal from Ervin Zukanović, as Standard Liège won 1–0. Two months later on 3 April 2011, Goreux scored his second goal of the season, in a 3–1 win against Anderlecht. A month later, his third goal of the season came on 11 May 2011 against Lokeren, which saw Standard Liège won 1–0. He was later featured in Belgian Cup, starting the match and played 78 minutes before being substituted, in a 2–0 win against Westerlo to win the tournament. Following this, Goreux signed a contract extension with the club, keeping him until 2014. At the end of the 2010–11 season, he went on to make twenty–three appearances and scoring three times in all competitions.

At the start of the 2011–12 season, Goreux started the season when he scored his first goal of the season, in a 3–1 win against Lokeren on 7 August 2011. Goreux wore the captain for the first time in his career, where he helped the side beat Helsingborg 1–0 in the first leg of the UEFA Europa League Qualification Round. Goreux was linked with a move to EFL Championship side Nottingham Forest but ended up staying at Standard Liège. However, he lost his first team place in the defence and was placed on the substitute bench. It wasn't until on 30 October 2011 when Goreux returned to the starting line-up against Sint-Truidense, setting up an equalising goal, in a 1–1 draw. He regained his first team place for Standard Liège since returning to the starting line-up. Goreux then resumed his role as captain in the UEFA Europa League match against Copenhagen and helped the side win 1–0. Over the next several months, he continued to remain as captain for Standard Liège. Having played in the right–back position for most of the season, Goreux also played in the right–midfield position. During a 2–0 loss against Club Brugge on 1 May 2012, he pushed Ryan Donk and after the match, there were calls that Goreux should face disciplinary action. In the end, he did not face further actions after appearing at the Sports Committee of the Belgian Football Association. At the end of the 2011–12 season, Goreux went on to make forty–two appearances and scoring two times in all competitions.

Having missed the opening game of the season, due to suspension, Goreux made his first appearance of the 2012–13 season, starting the whole game, in a 0–0 draw against Lierse on 3 August 2012. Since returning he started in a number of matches, playing in the right–back position. This lasted until 7 October 2012 when Goreux was sent–off for a second bookable offence, in a 2–1 win against Anderlecht. After returning from suspension, he regained his first team place for Standard Liège. Goreux then helped the club's defence keep three consecutive clean sheets between 18 November 2012 and 2 December 2012. It wasn't until on 7 December 2012 when he scored his first goal of the season, in a 6–1 win against Charleroi. Belgian media criticised Goreux's performances that he stopped talking to the media temporary. On the day Goreux signed for FC Krylia Sovetov Samara, he made his last appearance for the side, appearing as captain, in a 0–0 draw against Gent. By the time he left the club, Goreux had made twenty–one appearances and had scored once in all competitions.

=== FC Krylia Sovetov Samara ===
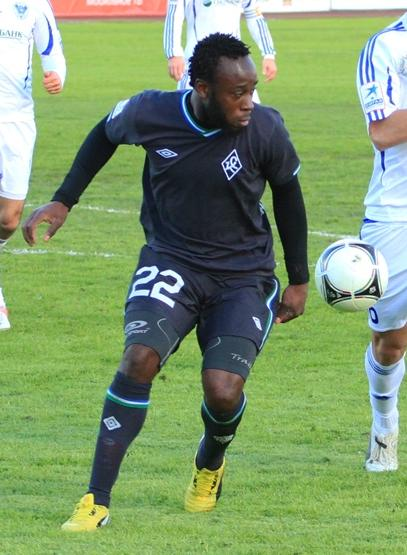
Goreux pictured during his time at Krylia Sovetov in April 2013.

It was reported on 12 January 2013 that Goreux agreed a move to Krylia Sovetov for a transfer fee worth 250,000 euros. The move was confirmed on 21 January 2013 and signed a three-year contract, becoming the first Haiti player to play in the Russian Premier League. Goreux later said his relationship with the club's board of directors as the reason from his departure from Standard Liège.

He made his FC Krylia Sovetov Samara debut, starting a match and played 73 minutes before being substituted, in a 2–0 loss against CSKA Moscow on 9 March 2013. Since making his debut for the club, Goreux quickly became a first team regular for the side, playing in the right–midfield position. It wasn't until on 13 April 2013 when he scored his first goal for the club, and setting up the club's second goal of the game, in a 3–0 win against FC Krasnodar. In a follow–up match against Spartak Vladikavkaz, Goreux scored his second goal for the club, in a 2–1 win. At the end of the 2012–13 season, he went on to make thirteen appearances and scoring two times in all competitions.

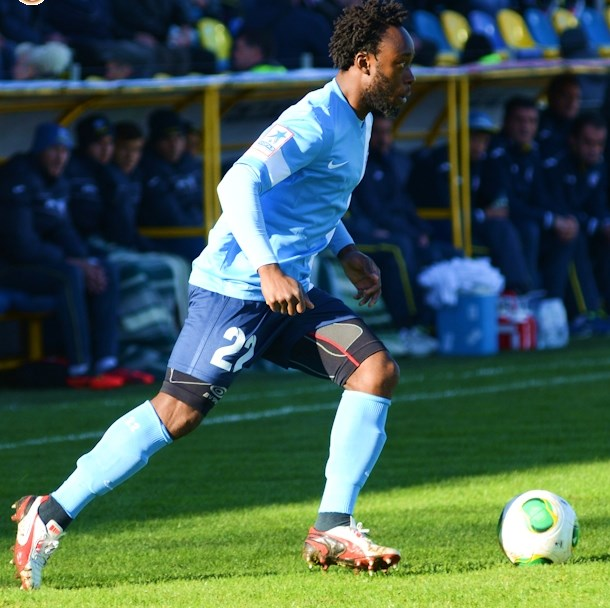
Goreux pictured during his time at Krylia Sovetov in October 2013.

At the start of the 2013–14 season, Goreux missed the opening game of the season against Spartak Moscow, due to injury. He then made his return to the starting line–up against CSKA Moscow on 22 July 2013, coming on as a 62nd-minute substitute, in a 2–1 loss. His performance attracted interests from Anzhi Makhachkala, but couldn't agree terms. Amid the transfer speculation, Goreux set up a goal for Ibragim Tsallagov, who scored the only goal of the game, in a 1–-0 win against Tom Tomsk on 18 August 2013. A month later on 25 September 2013, he scored his first goal of the season, in a 4–1 loss against Zenit Saint Petersburg. Goreux then played a role, setting up two goals, in a 2–1 win against FC Rostov on 20 October 2013. Since returning to the starting line–up, he regained his first team place, playing in the midfield position. On two occasions, Goreux played in the right–back position. However, he played in the first leg of relegation play–offs against Torpedo Moscow; as FC Krylia Sovetov Samara were relegated to the Russian Football National League. Despite being sidelined on two occasions later in the 2013–14 season, Goreux went on to make twenty–nine appearances and scoring once in all competitions. Following this, he was among several FC Krylia Sovetov Samara players to leave the club.

=== FC Rostov ===
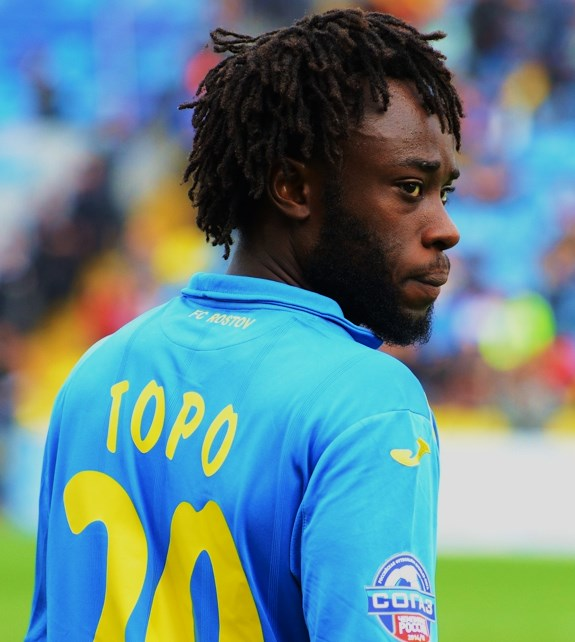
Goreux playing for FC Rostov in a match against Zenit Saint Petersburg on 20 September 2014.

On 11 August 2014, Goreux signed a two-year contract with FC Rostov, keeping him until 2016.

He made his FC Rostov debut three days later on 14 August 2014, coming on as a 34th-minute substitute, in a 2–1 loss against Lokomotiv Moscow. Since making his debut, Goreux quickly became a first team regular, playing in the right–back position. During his time at FC Rostov, he was involved in an incident on the pitch at least three occasions; the first incident occurred on 28 September 2014 against Terek Grozny. The second incident occurred on 22 November 2014 against Torpedo Moscow when Goreux were among several black players on the pitch to be racially abused by supporters. The third incident occurred on 8 December 2014 against Arsenal Tula when he was booked in the 30th minute for unprofessional conduct, in what turned out to be his last appearance. It was announced on 26 February 2015 that his contract was cancelled by the club. By the time he departed from FC Rostov, Goreux made seventeen appearances in all competitions.

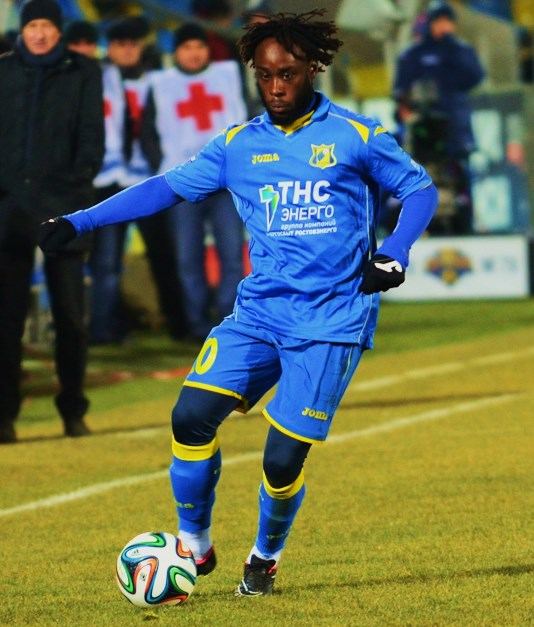
Goreux playing for FC Rostov in a match against Amkar Perm on 30 November 2014.

=== Return to Standard Liège ===
After spending six months as a free agent, Goreux rejoined Standard Liège for the second time in his career, signing a contract until the end of the 2015–16 season on 14 October 2015. He previously went on trial with the club to keep up with his fitness and spent two months there.

However, Goreux's return debut was delayed due to his international clearance wasn't completed in time but was given all clear on 23 October 2015. It wasn't until on 25 October 2015 when Goreux made his Standard Liège debut since leaving the club two years ago, starting the whole game, in a 3–2 win against Charleroi. His debut was overshadowed when he went to Standard Liège's stand and took the flag to place it on the centre spot. He then started in the next five matches before being sent–off in the 86th minute for an unprofessional foul, in a 3–2 win against Zulte Waregem on 27 November 2015. Following the match, Goreux was initially given a four match ban but was reduced to three instead. After serving a three match suspension, he made his return to the starting line-up, in a 4–1 loss against Oostende on 20 December 2015. Goreux regained his first team for the next six matches before suffering an injury that kept him out for three matches. He made his return to the starting line-up on 13 March 2016, in a 4–0 loss against K.V. Mechelen. As a result of his disappointment return performance against K.V. Mechelen, Goreux was dropped to the substitute bench in the Belgian Cup Final, as Standard Liège beat Club Brugge 2–1 to win the trophy. He then appeared in two matches as captain on 17 April 2016 and 22 April 2016 against Royal Excel Mouscron. However, Goreux suffered ankle injury that kept him out of the rest of the 2015–16 season. At the end of the 2015–16 season, he went on to make twenty appearances in all competitions. Following this, he signed a contract extension with the club, keeping him until 2018.

At the start of the 2016–17 season, Goreux started in the first six league matches of the season in the right–back position. However, he was dropped to the substitute bench, with Collins Fai preferred in the right–back position. But Goreux slowly returned to the starting line–up in the first team by the end of the year. He then scored his first goal for the club since 2012, in a 1–1 draw against Lokeren on 21 December 2016. After the match, Goreux was named Man of the Match on the club's website. As the 2016–17 season progressed, he continued to slowly return to the starting line–up in the first team. At the end of the 2016–17 season progressed, Goreux went on to make twenty–five appearances and scoring once in all competitions.

Goreux made his first appearance of the 2017–18 season, starting the whole game, in a 1–1 draw against K.V. Mechelen in the opening game of the season. However, he lost his first team place to Collins Fai, who was preferred in the right–back position, as well as, his own injury concern throughout the season. But Goreux did make another appearance on 30 March 2018, coming on as a late substitute, in a 3–1 win against Charleroi. Having finished the season making two appearances in the 2017–18 season, he signed a contract extension with the club.

In the 2018–19 season, Goreux continued to remain on the substitute bench, as he remain behind the pecking order in the right–back position. As a result, Goreux found his playing time at the club's reserves in a number of matches. It wasn't until on 23 September 2018 when he made his first appearance of the season, coming on as a late substitute, in a 2–1 loss against Anderlecht. Goreux later appeared as captain on two matches between 10 May 2019 and 16 May 2019 against Gent and Club Brugge. Both of the matches he started was praised by Het Nieuwsblad. At the end of the 2018–19 season, Goreux went on to make five appearances in all competitions.

In the 2019–20 season, Goreux continued to remain on the substitute bench, as he remain behind the pecking order in the right–back position, as well as, his own injury concern. It wasn't until on 4 December 2019 when Goreux made his first appearance of the season, appearing as captain and helped beat R.U.S. Rebecquoise 3–0 in Round of 16 of Beker Van België (the Belgian Crocky Cup). He also made another start in the league against Waasland-Beveren on 21 December 2019, only to be sent–off for the second bookable offence after 32 minutes, in a 2–1 loss; in what turned out to be his last appearance of his professional career. After the match, Manager Michel Preud'homme criticised Goreux for getting sent–off. After turning 32 on 31 December 2019, Goreux announced his retirement from professional football and was appointed as the club's youth coach. By the time he announced his retirement from professional football, Goreux made two appearances in the 2019–20 season.

== International career ==
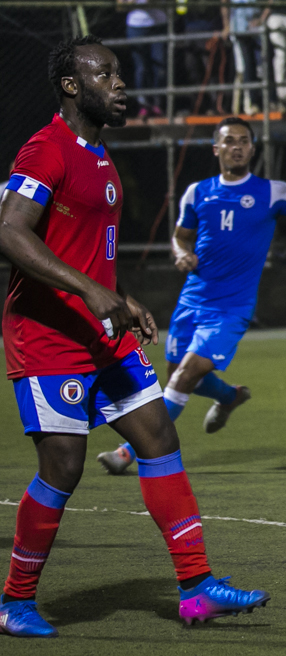
Goreux playing for the national team against Nicaragua in March 2017.

Goreux made his Belgium U21 debut, coming on as a second-half substitute, in a 2–1 loss against Switzerland U21 on 22 August 2007. He then made his first start for the U21 side, playing in the right–back position, in a 1–0 loss against Austria U21 on 7 September 2007. Goreux went on to make six appearances for the Belgium U21 side.

Goreux was called up for Haiti's friendly match against Trinidad and Tobago and the 2014 World Cup qualifiers against Curaçao, US Virgin Islands, and Antigua and Barbuda. He scored twice on his Haiti debut, as they won 7–0 against US Virgin Islands. A year later in September 2012, Goreux helped Haiti finish top of the Group One of the Caribbean Cup qualification.

In October 2014, Goreux was called up to the squad for the 2014 Caribbean Cup qualification and appeared three times, as he helped Haiti qualify for the tournament. The following month, he was called up to the squad for the Caribbean Cup, appearing three times in the tournament. The following July, he was called up to the squad for the 2015 CONCACAF Gold Cup, appearing two times in the tournament.

In May 2016, Goreux was called to Haiti's squad for the Copa América Centenario and appeared two times in the tournament. The following March, he played in both legs against Nicaragua in the Gold Cup Play-Off, as Haiti lost 4–3 on aggregate, in what turned out to be his last appearance for the national side.

== Career statistics ==
=== Club ===
As of 12 July 2017

| Club | Season | League | | | National Cup | | Europe | | Other | | Total | |
| Club | Season | Division | Apps | Goals | Apps | Goals | Apps | Goals | Apps | Goals | Apps | Goals |
|---|---|---|---|---|---|---|---|---|---|---|---|---|
| Standard Liège | 2008–09 | Pro League | 23 | 1 | 0 | 0 | 4 (Note: Appearances in the Europa League) | 0 | 1 (Note: Appearances in the Belgian Super Cup) | 0 | 28 | 1 |
| Standard Liège | 2009–10 | Pro League | 12 | 0 | 1 | 0 | 6 (Note: Three appearances in the Europa League and three in the Champions League) | 0 | ~ | ~ | 19 | 0 |
| Standard Liège | 2010–11 | Pro League | 19 | 2 | 3 | 0 | ~ | ~ | ~ | ~ | 22 | 2 |
| Standard Liège | 2011–12 | Pro League | 30 | 1 | 4 | 0 | 7 (Note: Six appearances in the Europa League and one in the Champions League) | 0 | 1 | 0 | 42 | 1 |
| Standard Liège | 2012–13 | Pro League | 19 | 1 | 2 | 0 | ~ | ~ | ~ | ~ | 21 | 1 |
| Standard Liège | Standard total I | | 103 | 5 | 10 | 0 | 17 | 0 | 2 | 0 | 132 | 5 |
| Sovetov | 2012–13 | Russian Premier League | 11 | 2 | 0 | 0 | 0 | 0 | 2 (Note: Appearances in the Russian Premier League relegation play-offs) | 0 | 13 | 2 |
| Sovetov | 2013–14 | Russian Premier League | 27 | 1 | 1 | 0 | 0 | 0 | 1 | 0 | 29 | 1 |
| Sovetov | Sovetov total | | 38 | 3 | 1 | 0 | 0 | 0 | 3 | 0 | 42 | 3 |
| Rostov | 2014–15 | Russian Premier League | 14 | 0 | 1 | 0 | 2 | 0 | 0 | 0 | 17 | 0 |
| Standard Liège | 2015–16 | Pro League | 17 | 3 | 0 | 0 | ~ | ~ | 0 | 0 | 17 | 3 |
| Standard Liège | 2016–17 | First Division A | 16 | 1 | 1 | 0 | 1 | 0 | 7 | 0 | 25 | 1 |
| Standard Liège | 2017–18 | First Division A | 0 | 0 | 0 | 0 | 0 | 0 | 0 | 0 | 0 | 0 |
| Standard Liège | Standard total II | | 33 | 4 | 1 | 0 | 1 | 0 | 7 | 0 | 42 | 4 |
| Career total | | | 188 | 12 | 13 | 0 | 20 | 0 | 12 | 0 | 233 | 12 |

== Personal life ==
Born in Saint-Michel, Haiti, Goreux moved to Belgium when he was two and half years old; Goreux have since holds Belgian nationality. Growing up, he lived in a foster home, where his foster mother worked as an economics teacher and his foster father René worked as a financial director at the provincial government of Liège. Goreux began playing football when he was a toddler. Goreux said in an interview that he could considered to be 50-50 Belgian and Haiti.

Following the earthquake in Haiti, Goreux said that he would plan a humanitarian action by establishing a school. During his time in Russia, Goreux was asked in an interview about Racism in Russia, which he responded by saying: "No, I have not encountered. In fact, racism is everywhere. In the world there is persecution of both white people and Arabs and black people." But Goreux recalled the racism incident in Samara, saying: "I calmly expected my taxi. We talked with an unknown guy, and then I got a blow in the face. I am not interested in football, only then they told me that the player of the Standard hit me. The guy really received a couple of slaps in the face from my friends, but I did not participate in this."

== Honours ==
Standard Liège

- Belgian First Division A: 2007–08, 2008–09
- Belgian Cup: 2010–11, 2015–16, 2017–18
- Belgian Super Cup: 2008

Haiti

- Caribbean Cup bronze:2014
