= Rorys Aragón =

Ecuadorian footballer (born 1982)

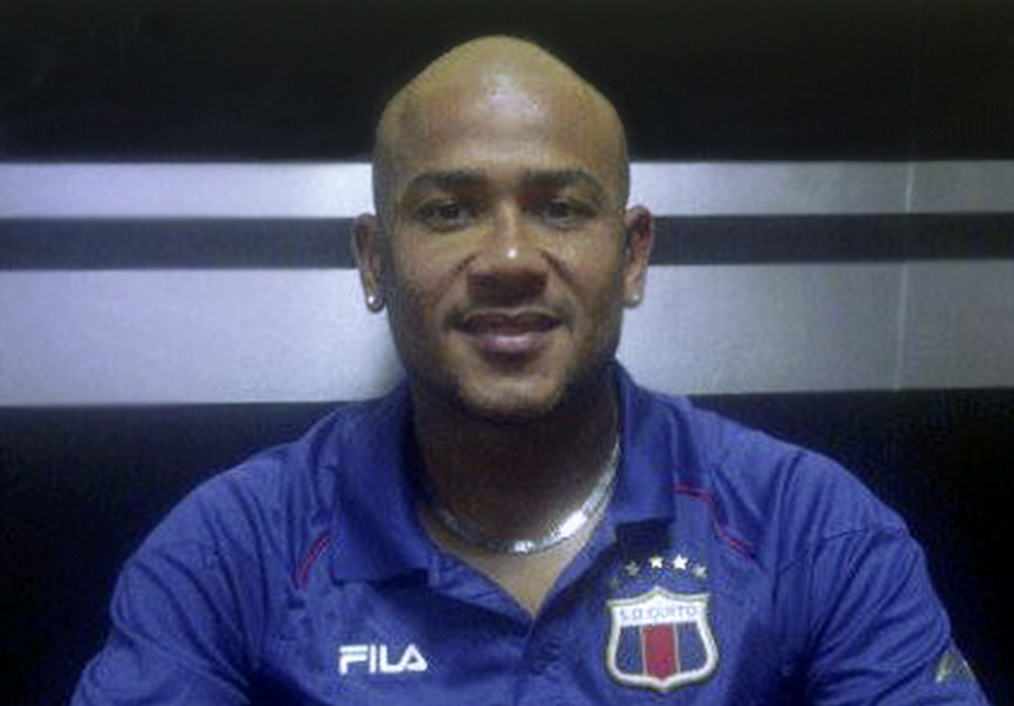

Personal information
- Full name: Rorys Andrés Aragón Espinoza
- Date of birth: 28 June 1982 (age 44)
- Place of birth: Esmeraldas, Ecuador
- Height: 1.88 m (6 ft 2 in)
- Position: Goalkeeper

Youth career
- 1999–2002: Emelec

Senior career*
Years	Team	Apps	(Gls)
1999–2004	Emelec	110	(0)
2004–2006	El Nacional	16	(0)
2006–2009	Standard Liège	55	(0)
2009	Diyarbakırspor	10	(0)
2010	El Nacional	24	(0)
2011	Barcelona SC	5	(0)
2012	Mushuc Runa S.C.	15	(0)
2013	Deportivo Azogues	2	(0)
2014	S.D. Quito	17	(0)

International career^{‡}
2007–2010	Ecuador	3	(0)
- * Club domestic league appearances and goals as of 14:32, 23 August 2010 (UTC) ‡ National team caps and goals as of 16:01, 21 March 2010 (UTC)

Rorys Andrés Aragón Espinoza (born 28 June 1982), commonly known as Rorys Aragón, is a former Ecuadorian football goalkeeper who used to play for numerous club teams and the Ecuadorian national team.

== Club career ==
Aragon played club football for Club Sport Emelec from 2001 to 2004 in his home town of Guayaquil, where he impressed in the domestic league as well as international tournaments at club level. He left the club and joined El Nacional de Quito from 2004 to 2006.

In 2006, he joined the Belgian club Standard Liège. Having won a league and cup double in his final season with Standard Liège, he joined Turkish Super Lig club Diryarbakirspor.

In 2010, he departed Turkey and returned to Ecuador, where he joined a succession of clubs, before retiring in 2014.

== International career ==
He appeared for the national team three times, starting two friendlies in 2007, and making a substitute appearance in 2010.

== Honours ==
Standard Liège

- Belgian First Division A: 2007–08, 2008–09
- Belgian Super Cup: 2008
