= Mohamed Sarr =

Senegalese footballer

Momo Sarr
Personal information
- Full name: Adama Mohamed Sarr
- Date of birth: 23 December 1983 (age 42)
- Place of birth: Dakar, Senegal
- Height: 1.84 m (6 ft 0 in)
- Position: Centre-back

Youth career
- –2000: Treviso

Senior career*
Years	Team	Apps	(Gls)
2000–2001	Treviso	12	(0)
2001–2005	Milan	10	(0)
2002–2003	→ Galatasaray(loan)	17	(1)
2003	→ Ancona (loan)	12	(0)
2003–2004	→ Atalanta (loan)	16	(0)
2004–2005	→ Vittoria (loan)	29	(0)
2005–2010	Standard Liège	109	(1)
2010–2011	Hércules	24	(0)
2011–2012	Genk	21	(0)
2012–2014	OFI	19	(2)
Total		269	(4)

International career
2001–2010	Senegal	16	(0)
- * Club domestic league appearances and goals

Mohamed Adama 'Momo' Sarr - Abdallah (born 23 December 1983) is a Senegalese former professional footballer who played as a centre-back.

== Career ==
Sarr's clubs include Treviso, AC Milan, Galatasaray, Ancona, Atalanta, Vittoria, Standard Liège, Hércules CF, Genk and OFI.

Whilst at Milan Sarr scored once against FC BATE Borisov in a 4–0 UEFA Cup win in September 2001.

Sarr made his debut for the Senegal national football team in 2001. He was part of the preliminary Senegal squad for 2002 Africa Cup of Nations.Ahead of Senegal's group stage match against France at the 2026 FIFA World Cup, Sarr shared his thoughts on the national team's progress. He stated in an interview that Senegal, as African champions, are no longer underdogs like they were in 2002.

== Honours ==
Standard Liège

- Belgian First Division A: 2007–08, 2008–09
- Belgian Super Cup: 2008, 2009
