= Jean-Pierre Vande Velde =

Belgian footballer

Personal information
- Date of birth: 10 September 1955 (age 71)
- Place of birth: Belgium
- Position: Midfielder

Senior career*
Years	Team	Apps	(Gls)
1968–1975	Anderlecht		
1975–1977	Union SG		
1977–1983	Ninove		
1983–1986	Lombeek		
1986–1987	Vorst		

Managerial career
- 1983–1986: Lombeek
- 1986–1987: Vorst
- 1987–1990: Tienen
- 1990–1992: Anderlecht (youth)
- 1992: Eendracht Aalst
- 1993–1995: Tienen
- 1995–1997: Standaard Wetteren
- 1997–1998: Standard Liège (assistant)
- 1998–1999: Strombeek
- 1999–2002: ZD Oud-Heverlee
- 2002–2004: OH Leuven
- 2004–2005: Denderleeuw EH
- 2005: Tienen
- 2005–2007: Dender EH
- 2008: Sint-Niklaas
- 2008–2009: Oostende
- 2009–2010: OH Leuven
- 2010–2012: VW Hamme
- 2012–2013: Dender EH
- 2013: Union SG
- 2014: Temse
- 2014–2015: Eendracht Zele
- 2016–2017: Dender EH
- 2017: Tienen
- 2017–2019: Ninove
- 2019–2020: Londerzeel
- 2022: Lokeren-Temse
- * Club domestic league appearances and goals

Jean-Pierre Vande Velde (born 10 September 1955) is a Belgian football manager and former player who is currently unemployed after most recently managing Lokeren-Temse playing in the Belgian Division 2.

Vande Velde has a managerial career of 30 years, including spells at Belgian giants Anderlecht (as youth trainer) and Standard Liège (as assistant). His major success was guiding Dender EH from the Belgian Third Division into the Belgian Pro League between 2005 and 2007. Other clubs include Oostende and OH Leuven.

In February 2014, Vande Velde took over from Colin Andrews as head coach at Temse and narrowly saved the team from relegation. In spite of that he was released at the end of the season. He then took charge at Eendracht Zele but was released with one match to go as Zele was relegated from the 2014–15 Belgian Third Division. In 2016, he returned to Dender EH, now playing in the Belgian First Amateur Division.
