= Benjamin Nicaise =

French footballer (born 1980)

Personal information
- Full name: Benjamin Nicaise
- Date of birth: 28 September 1980 (age 46)
- Place of birth: Maisons-Alfort, France
- Height: 1.84 m (6 ft 0 in)
- Position: Defensive midfielder

Youth career
- 1998–2000: Nancy

Senior career*
Years	Team	Apps	(Gls)
2000–2004	Nancy	104	(3)
2004–2005	Metz	14	(0)
2005–2006	Amiens	40	(2)
2007–2008	Mons	34	(2)
2008–2010	Standard Liège	25	(1)
2010–2011	Lierse	8	(0)
2011	Panthrakikos	10	(0)
2011–2013	Mons	38	(1)

Managerial career
- 2013: FC Brussels
- * Club domestic league appearances and goals

Benjamin Nicaise (born 28 September 1980) is a retired French footballer.

== Honours ==
Standard Liège

- Belgian First Division A: 2008–09
- Belgian Super Cup: 2008
