= Oguchi Onyewu =

American soccer player (born 1982)

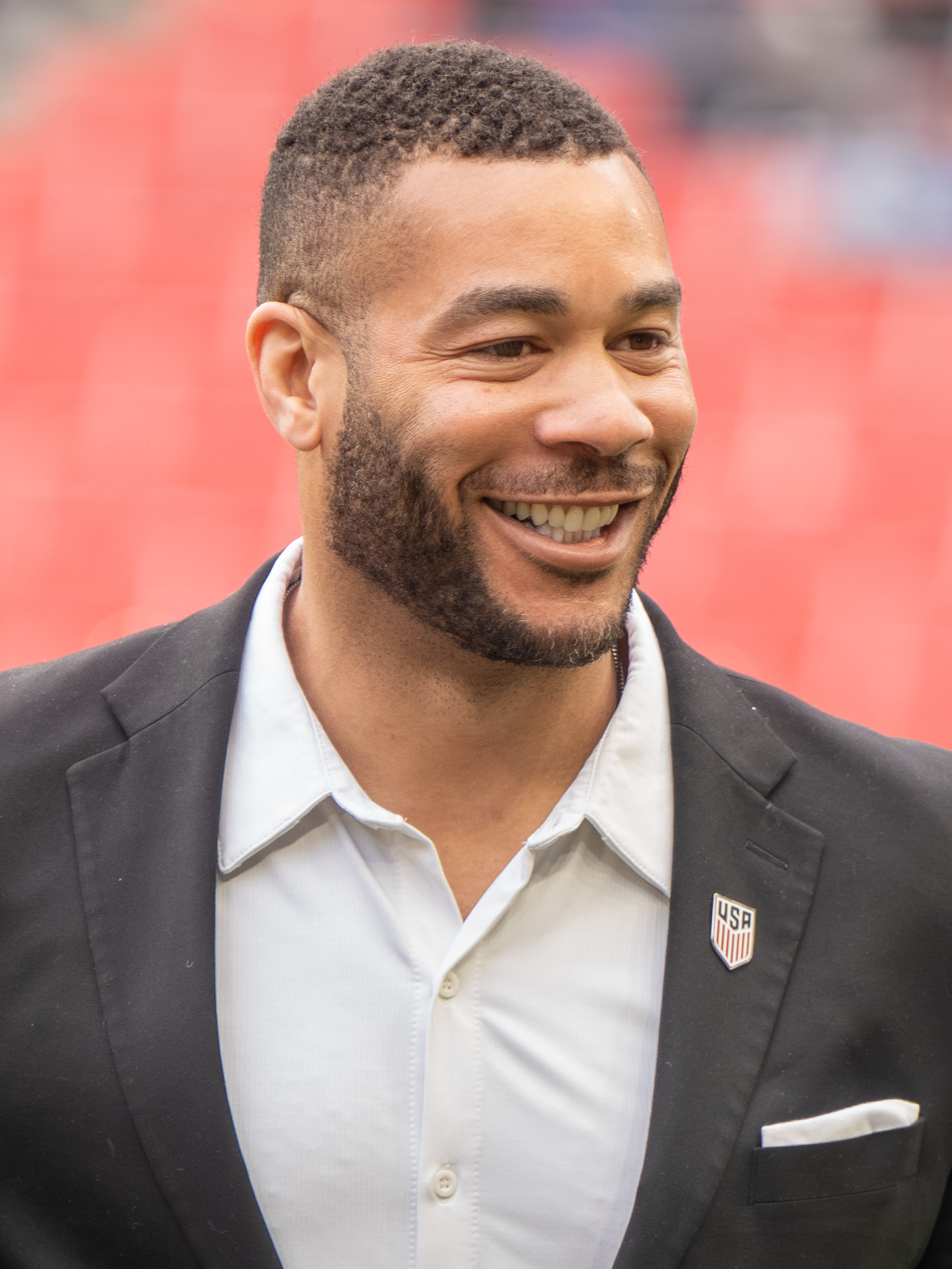
- Onyewu in 2026

Personal information
- Full name: Oguchialu Chijioke Onyewu
- Date of birth: May 13, 1982 (age 44)
- Place of birth: Washington, D.C., United States
- Height: 6 ft 4 in (1.93 m)
- Position: Center back

Youth career
- 1999: IMG Academy

College career
Years	Team	Apps	(Gls)
2000–2001	Clemson Tigers	43	(12)

Senior career*
Years	Team	Apps	(Gls)
2002–2004	Metz	3	(0)
2003–2004	→ La Louvière (loan)	24	(1)
2004–2009	Standard Liège	139	(11)
2007	→ Newcastle United (loan)	11	(0)
2009–2011	A.C. Milan	0	(0)
2011	→ Twente (loan)	8	(0)
2011–2013	Sporting CP	17	(4)
2012–2013	→ Málaga (loan)	9	(2)
2013–2014	Queens Park Rangers	0	(0)
2014	Sheffield Wednesday	18	(0)
2014–2015	Charlton Athletic	3	(0)
2017	Philadelphia Union	22	(1)
Total		255	(19)

International career
1999	United States U17	5	(2)
2001	United States U20	4	(0)
2004–2014	United States	69	(6)

Managerial career
- 2018–2020: Orlando City B (sporting director)
- 2021–2022: R.E. Virton (secretary general)
- 2023–: United States Soccer Federation (assistant sporting director)
Medal record
Representing United States
FIFA Confederations Cup
Runner-up	2009 South Africa	Team
CONCACAF Gold Cup
Winner	CONCACAF Gold Cup	2005
Winner	CONCACAF Gold Cup	2007
Winner	CONCACAF Gold Cup	2013
Runner-up	CONCACAF Gold Cup	2011
Men's Soccer
- * Club domestic league appearances and goals

Oguchialu Chijioke Onyewu // (born May 13, 1982) is an American former soccer player who is the Vice President of Sporting for the United States Soccer Federation. He was previously the sporting director for Orlando City B and secretary-general of R.E. Virton.

During his professional career, he played as a defender for clubs in France, Belgium, England, Italy, the Netherlands, Portugal, Spain, and the United States. Onyewu earned over 60 caps with the United States men's national soccer team and played for the United States at the 2006 and 2010 World Cups.

== Club career ==
=== College soccer and move to Europe ===
Onyewu grew up in the Washington, D.C. suburbs of Silver Spring and Olney, Maryland, where he attended St. Andrew Apostle School and Sherwood High School. Onyewu enrolled in the U.S. residency program in Bradenton, Florida, before returning to Sherwood to graduate. He then played two years of college soccer at Clemson University in South Carolina. He moved to Europe in 2002, signing with Metz of Ligue 2 in France. In 2003, he was loaned out to La Louvière in Belgium.

=== Standard Liège and Newcastle ===
Onyewu was loaned to Standard Liège in 2004. The move to Liège was made permanent for the 2004–05 season. After the season, he was named to the Belgian league's Best XI as well as Foreign Player of the Year for 2005. Having been the subject of many transfer rumors regarding clubs throughout Europe, Onyewu finally completed a loan deal with Newcastle United in January 2007, covering the remainder of the 2006–07 season. He made his debut for Newcastle against Fulham on February 3, and his home debut a week later, alongside Titus Bramble, in a 2–1 victory over Liverpool. The two formed an ill-fated partnership, making a number of costly mistakes which was ultimately to cost Onyewu his place. Following the arrival of new manager Sam Allardyce, Onyewu fell out of favor, and Newcastle decided not to make the loan deal permanent.

Onyewu returned to Standard, and his play continued to improve. He made his 100th Belgian First Division appearance for Standard Liège on March 14, 2008, against Germinal Beerschot, and was an integral part of the club as they went on a 29-match unbeaten streak to win the 2007–08 Belgian First Division. After the season, he was named to the Belgian league Best XI for the second time. His strong form continued during the 2008–09 season. He led the Standard defense to a second consecutive Belgian league title. Standard was drawn with Anderlecht at season's end, and Standard won a two-legged playoff for the championship.

Onyewu dealt with racism during his time in Belgium, even having been punched and shouted at by racist fans while playing for Standard Liège. The most well-publicized incident occurred in the 2008–09 Championship playoff when Anderlecht defender Jelle Van Damme, according to Onyewu, allegedly repeatedly called him a "dirty ape," even after Onyewu relayed the information to the referees. Van Damme denied the accusations following the match and in return said that Onyewu himself taunted him in a racist way by calling him "dirty Flemish." Approximately two weeks later, Onyewu's lawyer announced that he was suing Van Damme in an effort to end on-field racism in European soccer. The case was withdrawn in February 2011 after a meeting between the two players when Van Damme apologized for any offense he may have given.

=== Milan and loan spell with Twente ===
Onyewu signed a three-year contract with A.C. Milan in July 2009, but never played a league game in his eighteen-month spell at the club. He made his debut on September 30 as a substitute in a Champions League loss to Zürich at San Siro. Onyewu missed all the 2009–10 season—appearing in only one Champions League match—due to a knee injury suffered while on national team duty. At the end of the season, it was announced that Onyewu's contract with Milan was extended by one season, keeping him under contract with the club until the end of the 2012–13 season. Upon Onyewu's request, the one-year extension included no salary.

On November 5, 2010, Onyewu made international headlines when he and teammate Zlatan Ibrahimović engaged in a fight during training, before a league match against Bari. It was reported that Onyewu suffered a reckless tackle from Ibrahimović, causing Onyewu to confront him. The two were then separated by teammates, though the club reported he and Ibrahimović have made up for their fight.

In January 2011, Onyewu joined Dutch side Twente on loan until the end of the season. Onyewu made his debut for the Tukkers on the January 19 against Heracles Almelo in an Eredivisie fixture where he would play the full 90 minutes. Despite his stay being short lived at the Dutch side, Onyewu would feature predominantly in both domestic competitions and European competitions where his side reached the quarter finals. His stint with Twente saw him accumulate 14 appearances, as well as pick up a cup winners medal after Twente defeated Ajax 3–2 in the KNVB Cup final.

=== Spells in Portugal and Spain ===
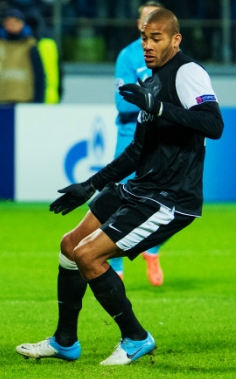
Onyewu with Málaga in 2012

In June 2011, Onyewu joined Portuguese side Sporting CP on a free transfer where he signed a three-year deal from A.C. Milan. In Sporting CP's first five competitive games of the season, three Primeira Liga and two European qualifying matches, Sporting manager Domingos Paciência opted to start central defenders Daniel Carriço and Alberto Rodríguez alongside Ânderson Polga, which left Onyewu on the bench. Injuries during the start of the season to Carriço and Polga led to manager Domingos Paciência starting Onyewu in Sporting's line-up. Onyewu made his team debut on the September 10 in a 3–2 away victory over Paços de Ferreira where he would play the full 90 minutes. He scored his first goal for Sporting CP against Rio Ave at the Estádio dos Arcos on September 19, a week after making his Sporting CP debut, in a 3–2 win in which Onyewu scored the winning goal from a header after a Diego Capel corner kick found him unmarked in the penalty area.

Unlike his time with A.C. Milan, Onyewu's playing time increased during the 2011–12 season. During the season, he gradually established himself as the first team regular starter, playing as a center-back alongside Ânderson Polga. Despite the sacking of Domingos Paciência and the introduction of Ricardo Sá Pinto as Sporting manager in early 2012, Onyewu remained a first team regular until mid February where he sustained an injury in a league match against Paços de Ferreira. Onyewu's injury, which turned out to be an internal lateral ligament and an external meniscus fracture to his right knee, kept the American out of action for two months. Onyewu's recovery saw him back in late April where he played his first match in two months against Nacional. Onyewu's recovery meant he would be available to compete in the 2012 Taça de Portugal Final where his side would come up on the losing end against Académica de Coimbra. Onyewu finished his first season with the Leões with 31 appearances to his name, and scoring five goals.

The appointment of Ricardo Sá Pinto as Sporting manager led to the arrival of Khalid Boulahrouz and Marcos Rojo, which saw Onyewu loaned out to Spanish La Liga outfit Málaga in August 2012. Onyewu made his team debut on October 24 in a UEFA Champions League match as a substitute in a 1–0 victory over his former side A.C. Milan. A week later, he started and scored his first Málaga goal against CP Cacereño on October 31 in a fourth-round Copa del Rey tie. Onyewu's goal-scoring form continued in the same competition against SD Eibar on December 18, where his stoppage time goal earned his side a draw. However, Onyewu's stay with Málaga proved to be unsuccessful as he struggled to establish himself as a first-team regular and only managed to play nine matches all season, contributing two goals.

Onyewu returned to Sporting in the summer of 2013 but agreed to a contract termination by mutual consent.

=== Return to England and beyond ===
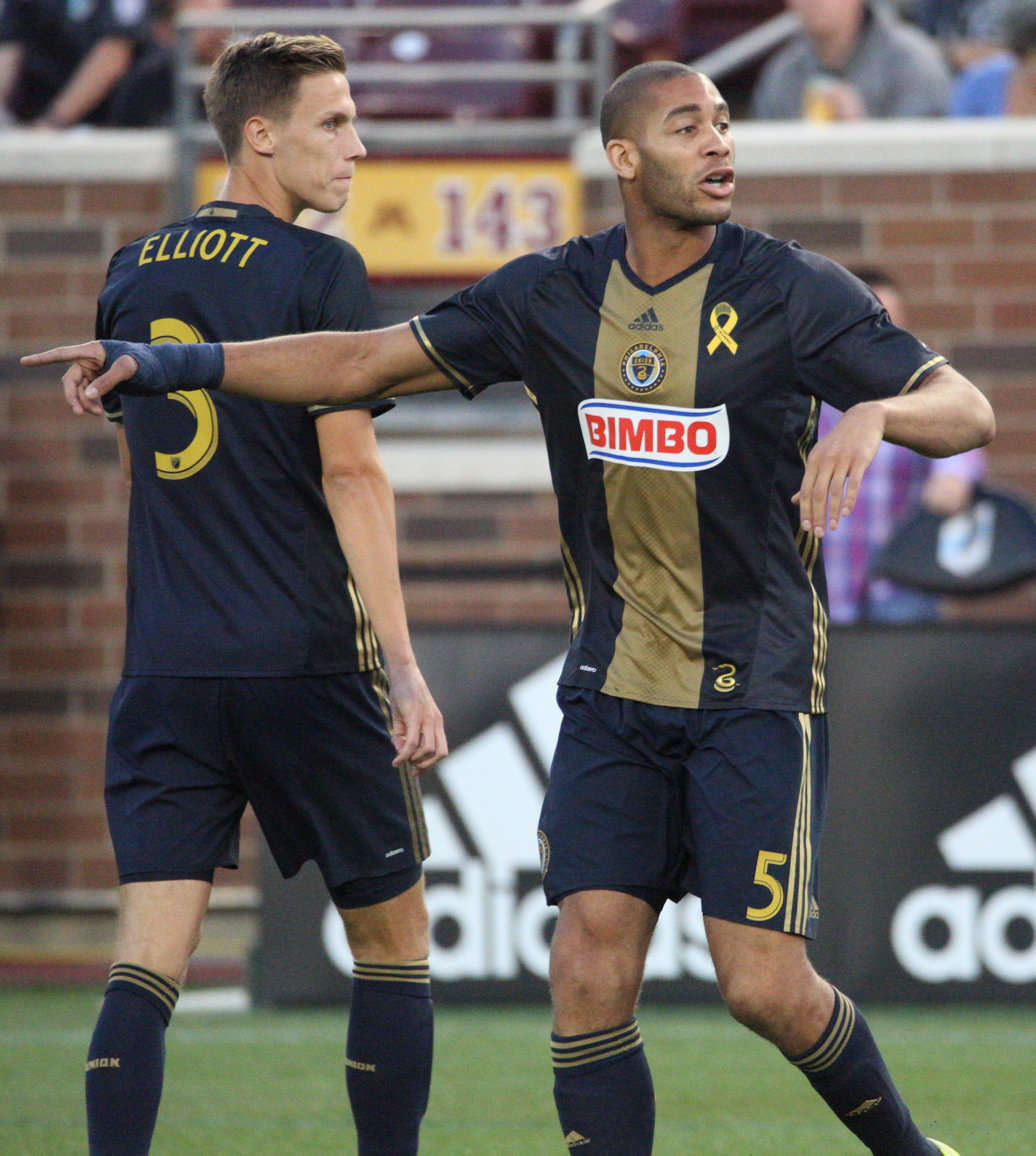
Onyewu with the Philadelphia Union in 2017

In October 2013, Onyewu signed with Queens Park Rangers on a free transfer, but he failed to make any appearances and was an unused substitute on six occasions. In January 2014, Onyewu joined Sheffield Wednesday until the end of the season.

In October 2014, Onyewu signed for Charlton Athletic on a short-term contract, making his debut as a substitute on December 26. The club extended his contract through the end of the season, but he was released following the conclusion of the season. Onyewu was released at the end of his contract in May 2015.

Onyewu trialed with Major League Soccer's New York City FC in May 2015 but was not signed. He later spent a preseason tour with Rangers of the Scottish Premiership in June 2016 but was not offered a contract.

=== Return to America ===
Onyewu signed with the Philadelphia Union during the 2017 MLS preseason. Originally brought in to be a veteran presence for a young backline Philadelphia, Onyewu became a regular starter for the Union earning 22 appearances and scoring once. Onyewu was released by the Union at the conclusion of the 2017 season.

=== Retirement ===
In September 2018, Onyewu announced his retirement from professional soccer via Instagram concluding a 15-year career.

== International career ==
Onyewu was a mainstay on the United States national team for the 2006 and 2010 World Cup cycles. Early in his career, Onyewu represented the U.S. at various youth levels, including at the 2001 World Youth Championship. He made his first appearance for the senior national team on October 13, 2004, against Panama. Onyewu scored his first international goal in the 2005 Gold Cup, nodding home the extra time winner in the semifinal against Honduras, and was later named to the tournament Best XI.

Oguchi played for the United States in the 2006 World Cup, and started in all three United States games. Just before halftime of the third and final group stage match against Ghana, Onyewu conceded a penalty from which Ghana scored, and the United States was eliminated by the 2–1 defeat. Onyewu was voted the 2006 U.S. Soccer Athlete of the Year. He was the first defender to earn the award since Alexi Lalas in 1995.

During the 2009 Confederations Cup, Onyewu was paired with Jay DeMerit due to the injury of his normal partner, Carlos Bocanegra, who was unable to play in the group stage. Onyewu played well against Egypt, helping lead the United States to a 3–0 win that earned them a berth in the semifinals. He also had a standout performance in the 2–0 semifinal victory over Spain.

In a World Cup qualifier draw against Costa Rica on October 14, 2009, Onyewu suffered a patellar tendon rupture, forcing him to miss the rest of qualifying.

During the 2010 World Cup, Onyewu started and played the full 90 minutes in the United States's first group match against England. During the second group match against Slovenia, he got his second start but was subbed out in the 80th minute. He did not play in the third group match against Algeria or the second round meeting against Ghana.

== Personal life ==
Onyewu's parents moved to the United States from Nigeria to study in Washington, D.C. They are ethnic Igbo people of Nigeria. Onyewu has two brothers, Uche and Nonye, and two sisters, Chi-Chi and Ogechi. He also holds Belgian citizenship. He speaks English, French, Italian, and Portuguese. Onyewu is a practicing Catholic.

At 6 ft 4 in (1.93 m) and 210 lb (95 kg), Onyewu is the second-tallest outfield player in United States national team history (after Omar Gonzalez). He is the first Vice President of Sport in the US.

Onyewu is a Global Ambassador for Grassroot Soccer, an adolescent health organization that leverages the power of soccer to equip young people with the life-saving information, services, and mentorship they need to live healthier lives.

Onyewu is also a lecturer at the HELEGS Executive Program in Law, Economics and Geopolitics of Professional Sports, where he shares his knowledge of the North American sports model.

=== Business interests ===
In early 2017, Onyewu co-opened a sports performance facility in Richmond, Virginia.

== Career statistics ==
=== Club ===
Appearances and goals by club, season and competition
Club	Season	League			National cup		League cup		Continental		Total	
Club	Season	Division	Apps	Goals	Apps	Goals	Apps	Goals	Apps	Goals	Apps	Goals
Metz	2002–03	Ligue 2	3	0	0	0	0	0	0	0	3	0
La Louvière (loan)	2003–04	Belgian Pro League	24	1	0	0	0	0	0	0	24	1
Standard Liège	2004–05	Belgian Pro League	30	3	0	0	0	0	0	0	30	3
Standard Liège	2005–06	Belgian Pro League	29	2	0	0	0	0	0	0	29	2
Standard Liège	2006–07	Belgian Pro League	15	1	2	0	0	0	2	0	19	1
Standard Liège	2007–08	Belgian Pro League	33	2	0	0	0	0	0	0	33	2
Standard Liège	2008–09	Belgian Pro League	34	3	1	2	0	0	8	1	43	6
Standard Liège	Total		141	11	3	2	0	0	10	1	154	14
Newcastle United (loan)	2006–07	Premier League	11	0	0	0	0	0	0	0	11	0
A.C. Milan	2009–10	Serie A	0	0	0	0	0	0	1	0	1	0
A.C. Milan	2010–11	Serie A	0	0	0	0	0	0	0	0	0	0
A.C. Milan	Total		0	0	0	0	0	0	1	0	1	0
Twente (loan)	2010–11	Eredivisie	8	0	1	0	0	0	5	0	14	0
Sporting CP	2011–12	Primeira Liga	17	4	5	0	3	1	5	0	30	5
Málaga (loan)	2012–13	La Liga	2	0	4	2	0	0	3	0	9	2
Queens Park Rangers	2013–14	Championship	0	0	0	0	0	0	0	0	0	0
Sheffield Wednesday	2013–14	Championship	18	0	1	1	0	0	0	0	19	1
Charlton Athletic	2014–15	Championship	3	0	0	0	0	0	0	0	3	0
Philadelphia Union	2017	MLS	22	1	0	0	–	–	0	0	22	1
Career total			249	17	14	5	3	1	24	1	290	24

=== International ===
Appearances and goals by national team and year
National team	Year	Apps	Goals
United States	2004	2	0
United States	2005	9	1
United States	2006	6	0
United States	2007	11	1
United States	2008	10	3
United States	2009	13	0
United States	2010	7	1
United States	2011	4	0
United States	2012	5	0
United States	2013	1	0
United States	2014	1	0
Total		69	6

Scores and results list United States' goal tally first, score column indicates score after each Onyewu goal.

List of international goals scored by Oguchi Onyewu
No.	Date	Venue	Opponent	Score	Result	Competition	Ref.
1.	July 21, 2005	Giants Stadium, East Rutherford, United States	Honduras	2–1	2–1	2005 CONCACAF Gold Cup	
2.	June 2, 2007	Spartan Stadium, San Jose, United States	China	4–1	4–1	Friendly	
3.	February 6, 2008	Reliant Stadium, Houston, United States	Mexico	1–0	2–2	Friendly	
4.	March 26, 2008	Stadion Miejski, Kraków, Kraków, Poland	Poland	2–0	3–0	Friendly	
5.	October 11, 2008	RFK Stadium, Washington, D.C., United States	Cuba	6–1	6–1	2010 World Cup qualifying	
6.	October 9, 2010	Soldier Field, Chicago, Illinois, United States	Poland	2–1	2–2	Friendly	

== Honors ==
La Louvière

- Belgian Cup: 2002–03

Standard Liège

- Belgian First Division: 2007–08, 2008–09
- Belgian Supercup: 2008

Twente

- KNVB Cup: 2010–11

United States

- CONCACAF Gold Cup: 2005, 2007, 2013

Individual

- NCAA: All-American: NSCAA Second Team: 2001
- Belgian First Division: Best XI: 2004–05, 2007–08
- Belgian First Division: Best Foreign Player: 2003–05
- U.S. Soccer Athlete of the Year: 2006
- CONCACAF Gold Cup Best XI: 2005
