= Steven Defour =

Belgian footballer and manager (born 1988)

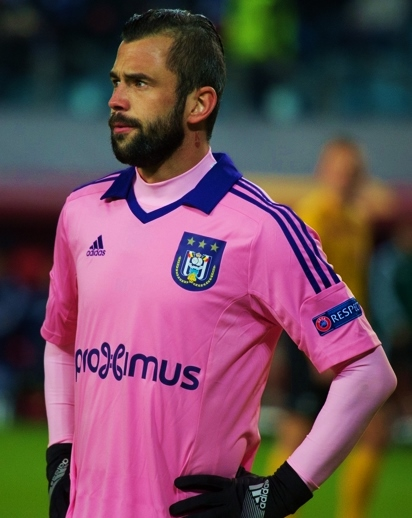
- Defour playing for Anderlecht in 2015

Personal information
- Full name: Steven Arnold Defour
- Date of birth: 15 April 1988 (age 38)
- Place of birth: Mechelen, Belgium
- Height: 1.73 m (5 ft 8 in)
- Position: Midfielder

Youth career
- 1993–1997: Zennester Hombeek
- 1997–2004: Mechelen

Senior career*
Years	Team	Apps	(Gls)
2004–2006	Genk	30	(1)
2006–2011	Standard Liège	127	(13)
2011–2014	Porto	65	(3)
2014–2016	Anderlecht	63	(9)
2016–2019	Burnley	51	(2)
2019–2020	Antwerp	11	(0)
2020–2021	Mechelen	16	(0)
Total		363	(28)

International career
2003	Belgium U15	5	(1)
2003–2004	Belgium U16	11	(1)
2004–2005	Belgium U17	11	(1)
2005	Belgium U18	1	(0)
2006–2017	Belgium	52	(2)

Managerial career
- 2021–2022: Mechelen (assistant)
- 2022–2023: Mechelen
- * Club domestic league appearances and goals

Steven Arnold Defour (born 15 April 1988) is a Belgian former professional footballer who played as a midfielder, currently a manager.

He played 247 games and scored 23 goals in the Belgian Pro League for Genk, Standard Liège, Anderlecht, Antwerp and Mechelen, winning two league titles and a national cup with the second team. Abroad, he won the Primeira Liga twice at Porto and played in the Premier League for three years at Burnley.

Defour earned 52 caps for Belgium in an 11-year international career that began in 2006, and represented the nation in the 2014 World Cup.

== Club career ==
=== Genk ===
Born in Mechelen, Defour played youth football with local K.V. Mechelen, moving to K.R.C. Genk in 2004. He made his Pro League debut on 30 October 2004 as a 78th-minute substitute for Paul Kpaka in a 1–0 home win against Sint-Truidense V.V. in a Limburg derby, and scored his first goal on 5 November the following year, also assisting in the 4–1 victory over K.S.V. Roeselare at the Fenixstadion. At just 17, he became first choice, finishing the 2005–06 campaign with 26 games and one goal to help his team to the fifth position.

When Genk failed to qualify for European competition, Defour tried to move to AFC Ajax in the summer of 2006. Enraged by earlier reports that Ajax had approached the player to broker a deal without their consent, Genk did not accept the proposed transfer fee, and after protracted negotiations, Ajax pulled out of the deal. Defour tried to force a transfer by threatening to leave, using a Belgian law that allowed professional athletes on fixed-term contracts to leave their employers before the end of the stipulated term, but Ajax did not express a renewed interest in his services, and he ended up signing for Standard Liège for a much-reduced transfer fee, effectively breaking a gentlemen's agreement between Belgian sides not to sign under-contract players using the aforementioned law.

=== Standard Liège ===
Defour joined Standard on a five-year deal, being appointed team captain at the start of his second year after taking over from Portugal's Sérgio Conceição – he was just 19 years old. He received the Belgian Golden Shoe at the end of the season in the process, leading the Reds to their first league title in 25 years.

In late 2009, shortly after scoring four goals in 31 games to help Standard renew their domestic supremacy, Defour broke his right foot. During his period of recovery he received a letter from Alex Ferguson, manager of Manchester United, wishing him all the best in his recovery, and this led to persistent rumours of a switch to the English club, but he refuted these by saying "I do know that Manchester United are monitoring me – if everything goes well and I continue playing as I am, there is a better chance of me leaving than there was at the start of the season"; eventually, nothing came of it.

=== Porto ===
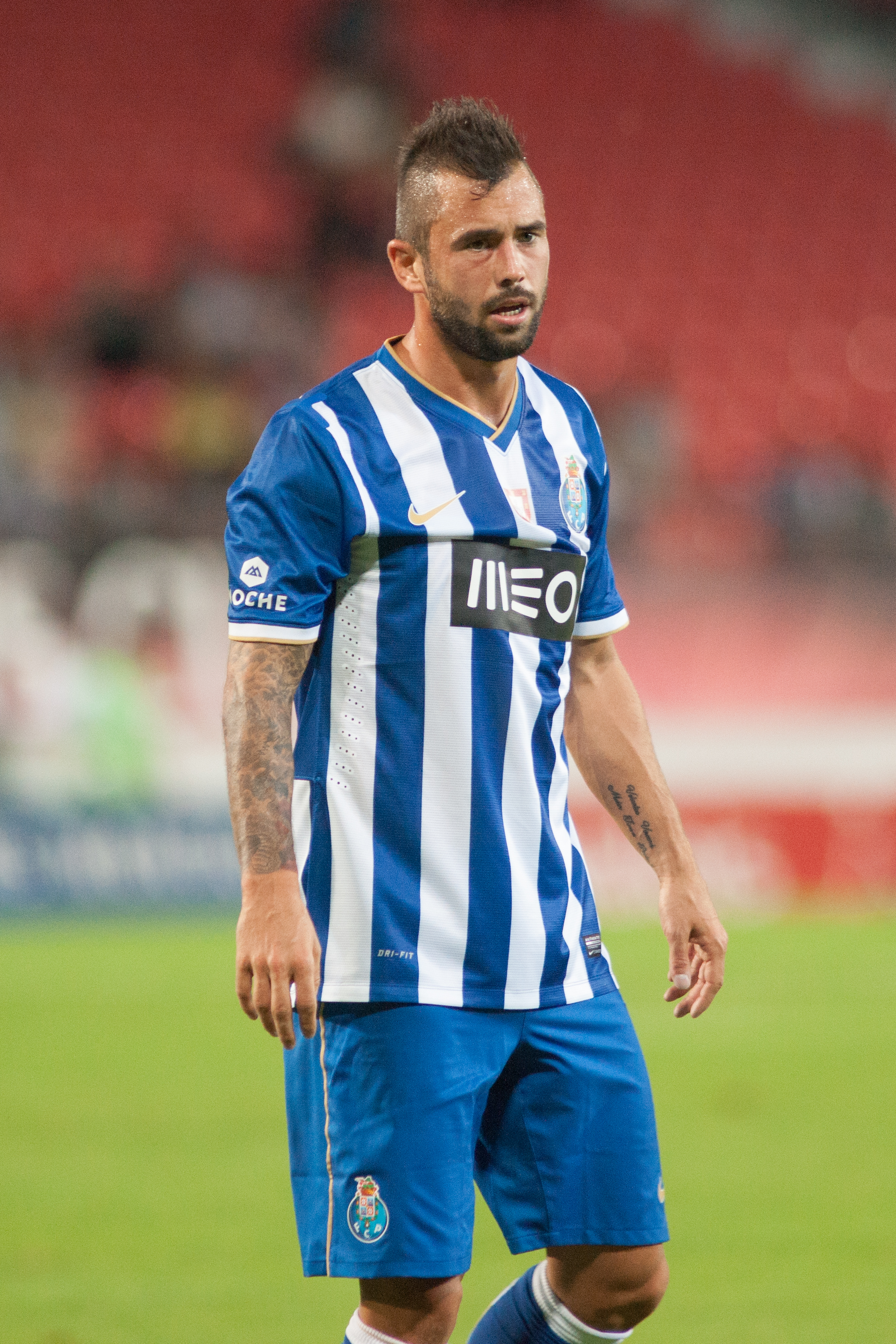
Defour playing for Porto in 2013

On 15 August 2011, Portuguese club FC Porto agreed to buy the sporting rights of Defour for €6 million, and he signed a five-year contract. He finished his first year with 37 official appearances and added two goals, helping his new team to win the Primeira Liga championship.

Defour netted Porto's second goal against GNK Dinamo Zagreb on 18 September 2012 in the group stage of the UEFA Champions League (2–0 away win). The following 13 March, for the same competition but in the round of 16, he was booked twice and subsequently sent off in the 49th minute of the second leg of the tie at Málaga CF, as the northerners lost 2–0 at La Rosaleda Stadium and 2–1 on aggregate.

=== Anderlecht ===
On 13 August 2014, Defour moved to R.S.C. Anderlecht on a five-year deal, for €6 million. On 25 January of the following year, when playing at Standard Liège, he was sent off for deliberately kicking the ball at home fans who had unfurled a banner depicting his severed head under the slogan "Red or Dead". His ejection caused the visiting supporters to rip out their seats and throw them onto the pitch, and the banner received criticism from both the Royal Belgian Football Association and the league.

=== Burnley ===
On 16 August 2016, Defour signed for Premier League club Burnley on a three-year deal for a club-record transfer fee of £8 million. He made his competitive debut four days later, starting in a 2–0 home win over Liverpool in which he helped create the second goal by Andre Gray but was substituted early in the second half due to a lack of fitness. On 10 September, also at Turf Moor, he scored his first goal for his new team to open a 1–1 draw with fellow promotee Hull City, and was praised after the match by manager Sean Dyche.

Defour scored a 25-yard direct free kick on 26 December 2017, as Burnley led 2–0 at half-time in an eventual draw at Manchester United. During his later spell, he was constantly bothered by injury problems. His contract was extended in September 2018 to last until June 2020, but on 31 August 2019, he had it terminated citing personal reasons and a need to return to Belgium.

In September 2022, Dyche named Defour as the most talented player he ever coached in his ten years at Burnley.

=== Later career ===
In September 2019, aged 31, Defour joined Antwerp on a one-year deal. On 16 October 2020, he returned to Mechelen 13 years after leaving the Achter de Kazerne, agreeing to a performance-oriented contract.

Defour announced his retirement on 11 May 2021.

== International career ==
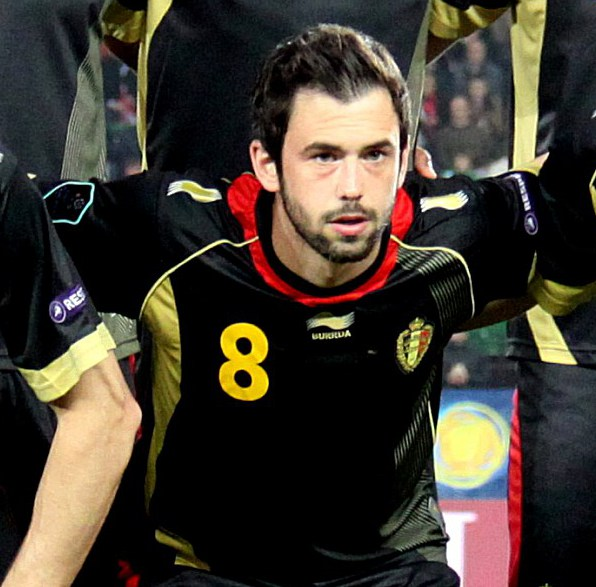
Defour lining up for Belgium in 2011

Defour was first called up for the Belgian senior team by manager René Vandereycken in May 2006, aged just 18. He made his debut on 11 May in a friendly against Saudi Arabia in Sittard in the Netherlands, playing all but the last minute of a 2–1 win; he scored his first goal on 6 September 2008, in a 3–2 victory over Estonia at his club ground the Stade Maurice Dufrasne for the 2010 FIFA World Cup qualifiers.

Defour scored once in three appearances in qualification for the 2014 World Cup, opening a 2–0 away defeat of Scotland on 6 September 2013. He was selected for the finals in Brazil by manager Marc Wilmots, making his debut in the competition on 26 June in the third group stage match against South Korea after Belgium had already won their first two outings and sealed qualification, and was sent off in the last minute of the first half of the eventual 1–0 win after a rash tackle on Kim Shin-wook.

Defour missed UEFA Euro 2016 due to injury and the 2018 World Cup, having been sidelined since that January. On 25 May that year, the 30-year-old announced his retirement from international football.

== Coaching career ==
On 17 October 2022, Defour returned to Mechelen as head coach; previously an assistant, he replaced the dismissed Danny Buijs. In his first game two days later, he won 2–0 at home to Standard; he reached the final of the Belgian Cup in his first season, losing 2–0 to Mark van Bommel's Antwerp.

On 2 November 2023, after having been ousted by lowly Royal Knokke F.C. in the round of 32 of the domestic cup and with the team inside the relegation zone in the league, Defour was shown the door.

== Career statistics ==
=== Club ===
Appearances and goals by club, season and competition
Club	Season	League			National Cup		League Cup		Europe		Other		Total	
Club	Season	Division	Apps	Goals	Apps	Goals	Apps	Goals	Apps	Goals	Apps	Goals	Apps	Goals
Genk	2004–05	Belgian First Division	4	0	0	0	—		0	0	—		4	0
Genk	2005–06	Belgian First Division	26	1	2	0	—		1 (Note: Appearances in UEFA Cup)	0	—		29	1
Genk	Total		30	1	2	0	—		1	0	—		33	1
Standard Liège	2006–07	Belgian First Division	29	4	7	1	—		4 (Note: Two appearances in UEFA Champions League, two in UEFA Cup)	0	—		40	5
Standard Liège	2007–08	Belgian First Division	24	1	3	1	—		3	0	—		30	2
Standard Liège	2008–09	Belgian Pro League	33	4	1	0	—		10 (Note: Two appearances in UEFA Champions League, eight in UEFA Cup)	0	1 (Note: Appearance in Belgian Super Cup)	0	45	4
Standard Liège	2009–10	Belgian Pro League	13	1	0	0	—		3 (Note: Appearances in UEFA Europa League)	0	1	0	17	1
Standard Liège	2010–11	Belgian Pro League	27	3	5	0	—		—		—		32	3
Standard Liège	2011–12	Belgian Pro League	1	0	—		—		—		0	0	1	0
Standard Liège	Total		127	13	16	2	—		20	0	2	0	165	15
Porto	2011–12	Primeira Liga	24	1	2	1	3	0	8 (Note: Six appearances in UEFA Champions League, two in UEFA Europa League)	0	0	0	37	2
Porto	2012–13	Primeira Liga	25	2	2	0	5	1	7 (Note: Appearances in UEFA Champions League)	1	1 (Note: Appearance in Supertaça Cândido de Oliveira)	0	40	4
Porto	2013–14	Primeira Liga	16	0	6	1	4	0	9 (Note: Five appearances in UEFA Champions League, four in UEFA Europa League)	0	1	0	36	1
Porto	Total		65	3	10	2	12	1	24	1	2	0	113	7
Anderlecht	2014–15	Belgian Pro League	29	6	4	1	—		6 (Note: Four appearances in UEFA Champions League, two in UEFA Europa League)	0	—		39	7
Anderlecht	2015–16	Belgian Pro League	32	2	1	1	—		9	0	—		42	3
Anderlecht	2016–17	Belgian First Division A	2	1	—		—		2	0	—		4	1
Anderlecht	Total		63	9	5	2	—		17	0	—		85	11
Burnley	2016–17	Premier League	21	1	3	1	0	0	—		—		24	2
Burnley	2017–18	Premier League	24	1	0	0	1	0	—		—		25	1
Burnley	2018–19	Premier League	6	0	2	0	1	0	0	0	—		9	0
Burnley	Total		51	2	5	1	2	0	0	0	—		58	3
Royal Antwerp	2019–20	Belgian First Division A	11	0	1	0	—		—		—		12	0
Mechelen	2020–21	Belgian First Division A	16	0	3	0	—		—		—		19	0
Career total			363	28	42	7	14	1	62	1	4	0	485	37

=== International ===
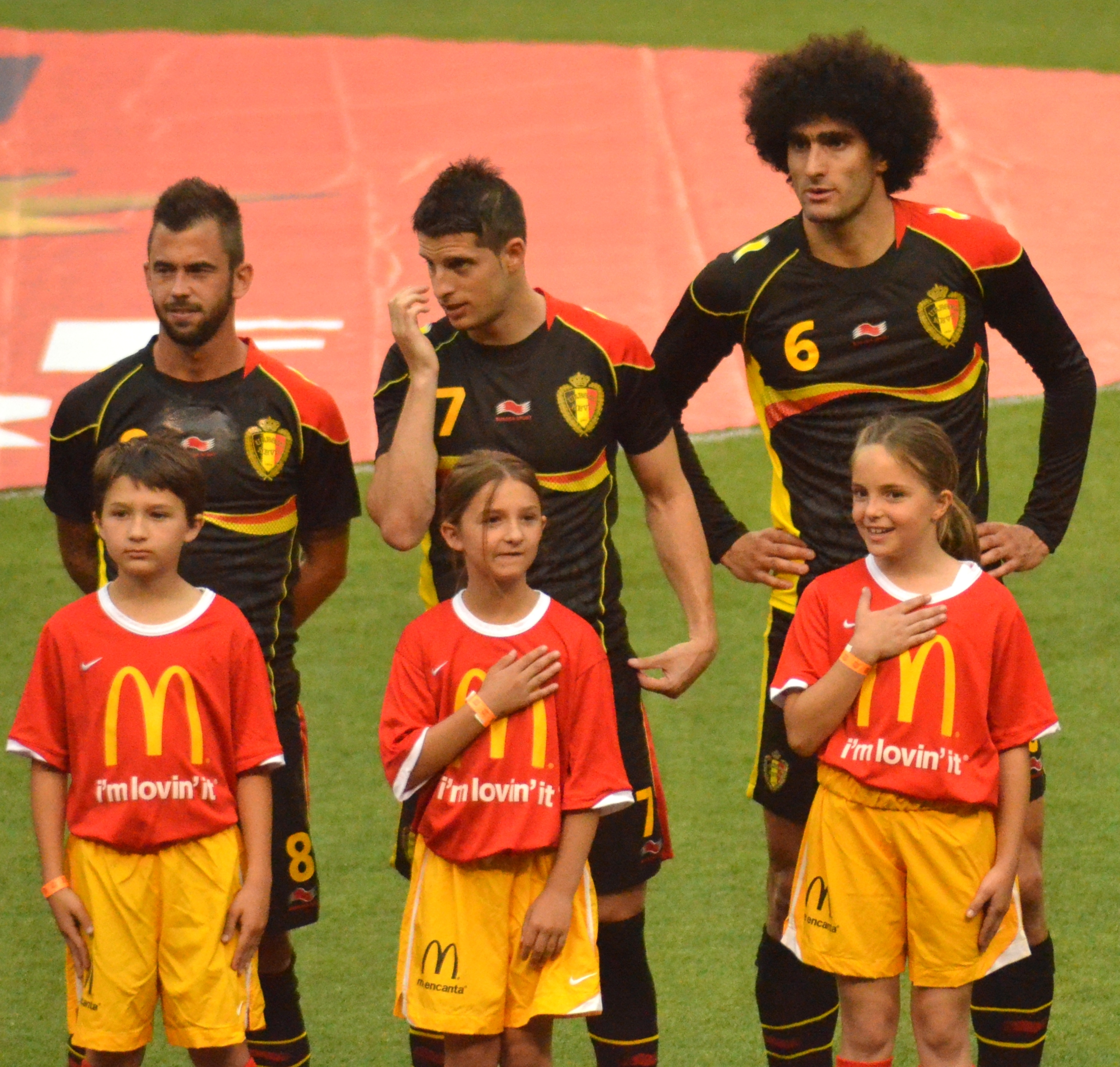
Defour (left) with Belgian teammates Kevin Mirallas (middle) and Marouane Fellaini before a friendly against the United States on 29 May 2013

Appearances and goals by national team and year
National team	Year	Apps	Goals
Belgium	2006	3	0
Belgium	2007	9	0
Belgium	2008	6	1
Belgium	2009	5	0
Belgium	2010	4	0
Belgium	2011	5	0
Belgium	2012	5	0
Belgium	2013	5	1
Belgium	2014	6	0
Belgium	2016	3	0
Belgium	2017	1	0
Total		52	2

Scores and results list Belgium's goal tally first, score column indicates score after each Defour goal.

International goals by date, venue, cap, opponent, score, result and competition
No.	Date	Venue	Cap	Opponent	Score	Result	Competition
1	6 September 2008	Stade Maurice Dufrasne, Liège, Belgium	15	Estonia	2–1	3–2	2010 World Cup qualification
2	6 September 2013	Hampden Park, Glasgow, Scotland	39	Scotland	1–0	2–0	2014 World Cup qualification

== Managerial statistics ==
As of match played 31 October 2023

Managerial record by team and tenure
Team	Nat	From	To	Record							
Team	Nat	From	To	G	W	D	L	GF	GA	GD	Win %
Mechelen	(Belgium)	17 October 2022	2 November 2023	41	15	9	17	50	62	−12	36.59
Career totals				41	15	9	17	50	62	−12	36.59

== Honours ==
Standard Liège

- Belgian Pro League: 2007–08, 2008–09
- Belgian Cup: 2010–11
- Belgian Supercup: 2008, 2009

Porto

- Primeira Liga: 2011–12, 2012–13
- Supertaça Cândido de Oliveira: 2012, 2013

Individual

- Belgian Golden Shoe: 2007
- Belgian First Division Man of the Season: 2007–08
