= Salim Tuama =

Israeli footballer (born 1979)

Salim Tuama سليم طعمه
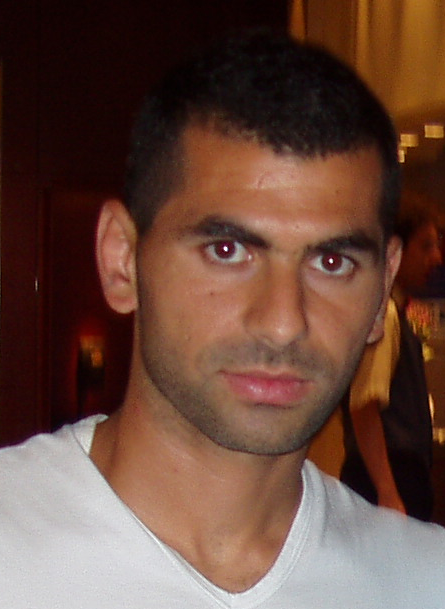

Personal information
- Date of birth: August 9, 1979 (age 47)
- Place of birth: Lod, Israel
- Height: 1.73 m (5 ft 8 in)
- Position: Left winger

Youth career
- 1995–1997: Gadna Tel Aviv Yehuda

Senior career*
Years	Team	Apps	(Gls)
1998–2003	Hapoel Tel Aviv	148	(27)
2003–2004	Maccabi Petah Tikva	28	(5)
2004	Kayserispor	5	(0)
2005–2006	Maccabi Petah Tikva	31	(4)
2006–2007	Hapoel Tel Aviv	29	(8)
2007–2009	Standard Liège	30	(5)
2009–2010	AEL	23	(2)
2010–2014	Hapoel Tel Aviv	99	(10)
2014–2015	Hapoel Bnei Lod	32	(3)
2015–2017	Maccabi Sha'arayim	27	(3)

International career
1999–2000	Israel U21	10	(1)
2005–2009	Israel	13	(1)

Managerial career
- 2016–2017: Maccabi Sha'arayim (manager-player)
- * Club domestic league appearances and goals as of 1 June 2014

Salim Tuama (Arabic: سليم طعمه, Hebrew: סלים טועמה; born August 9, 1979) is an Israeli footballer who plays as a midfielder for Maccabi Sha'arayim. His former clubs include Hapoel Tel Aviv, Standard Liège, Maccabi Petah Tikva, Kayserispor, AEL, Hapoel Bnei Lod and the youth club Gadna Tel Aviv Yehuda.

An Arab citizen of Israel of Greek Orthodox descent, he has 13 caps for the Israel national team.

== Career ==
Tuama has lived his life in the city of Lod, but began his career using the facilities of the Gadna club due to the poor conditions of Lod's fields and football schools.

Tuama became the hottest prospect in Israeli football in the 1998–99 season when he, along with Kfir Udi, Omri Afek, and Pini Balili, all of whom had been chosen by Israeli manager Dror Kashtan, led Hapoel to their first State Cup title since 1983, followed by a double in the next season 1999–2000.

He also played a main role in the historic appearance of Hapoel Tel Aviv in the quarter-finals of the 2001–02 UEFA Cup where they were defeated by AC Milan.

At the time it was believed that Hapoel was on its way to a golden age, but Kashtan left the club in 2004 to take a break from football. By then Tuama had moved on to Maccabi Petah Tikva, where they won the Toto Cup (an event staged each year by league level for a financial prize). He received his first big break the following season by signing with the Turkish club Kayserispor (today, "Kayseri Erciyesspor"), where he filled in a disappointing season with little playing time. At the same time his old Hapoel teammate Balili had signed with Sivasspor, a B league club he helped climb to the Süper Lig. In the same season he returned to Maccabi Petah Tikva to help them log in perhaps their most impressive finish, second place and a ticket to the UEFA Cup.

After a disappointing 2005–06 season with Maccabi Petah Tikva, after a great start in the UEFA Cup qualifiers, he signed with Hapoel Tel Aviv. On June 28, 2007, Toama had signed a three-year contract with Standard Liège.

Tuama left Belgium after two seasons at Standard Liège, as he was injured for many parts of his second season there, and did not get many chances. He signed for Greek side AEL and spent one season there, scoring two goals. At the end of the 2009–10 season, Tuama returned to Israel and signed, for the third time in his career, with then double holders Hapoel Tel Aviv. He scored the winning goal in a 1–0 victory over newly crowned champions Maccabi Haifa in the Israeli State Cup final of 2010–11.

== International goals ==
#	Date	Venue	Opponent	Score	Result	Competition
1.	October 11, 2008	Stade Josy Barthel, Luxembourg	Luxembourg	3–1	3–1	World Cup 2010 qualifier

== Honours ==
- Israeli Premier League (1):
  - 1999–00
- State Cup (5):
  - 1999, 2000, 2007, 2011, 2012
- Toto Cup (1):
  - 2001–02
- Belgian League (2):
  - 2007–08, 2008–09
- Belgian Supercup (1):
  - 2008
- Toto Cup Leumit (1):
  - 2014-15
