= Marcos Camozzato =

Brazilian footballer

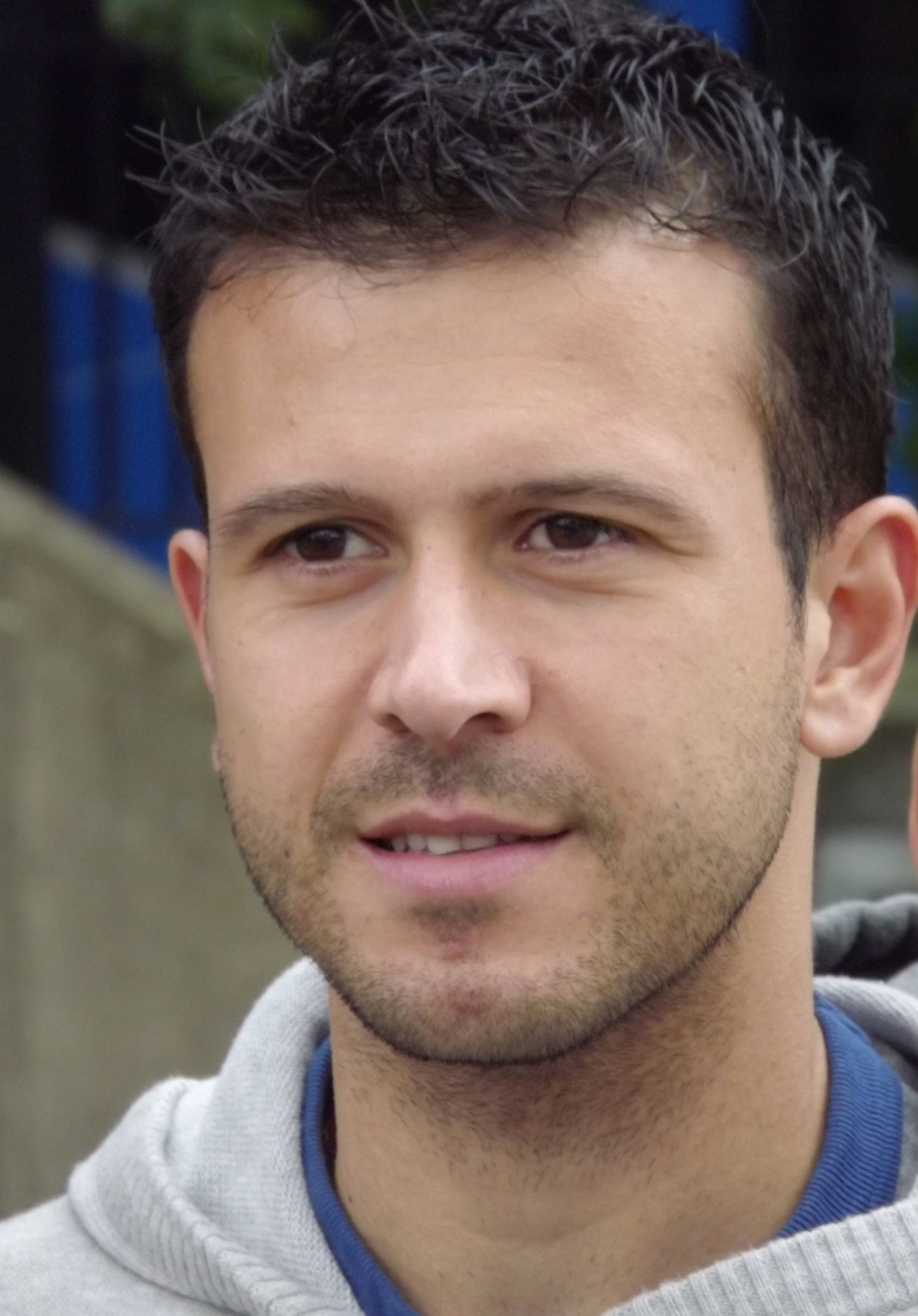

Personal information
- Full name: Marcos Camozzato
- Date of birth: June 17, 1983 (age 43)
- Place of birth: Porto Alegre, Brazil
- Height: 1.77 m (5 ft 9 1/2 in)
- Position: Right wing back

Youth career
- 2002–2003: Internacional

Senior career*
Years	Team	Apps	(Gls)
2003–2007	Internacional	4	(0)
2005	→ Caxias (loan)		
2006–2007	→ Standard Liège (loan)	1	(0)
2007–2010	Standard Liège	94	(1)
2010–2012	Club Brugge	23	(0)
2012–2013	Ponte Preta		
2013–2015	K.S.V. Roeselare		
- * Club domestic league appearances and goals as of May 10, 2011

Marcos Camozzato (born June 17, 1983 in Porto Alegre, Rio Grande do Sul) is a retired Brazilian footballer who last played for Roeselare in the Belgian Second Division.

== Career ==
He started in the youth categories of Internacional, known only by his first name, Marcos. Inter's president at the time, Fernando Carvalho, suggested the change to only Camozzatto, the surname of his Italian origins, because it could be more attractive for the European leagues, where the boy could get dual citizenship (in a similar case of his fellows from Inter's youth team, Rafael Sobis and Marcelo Labarthe – differently from them, he would be known only by his surname).

On 16 June 2010, Club Brugge signed the Brazilian right-back from League rival Standard Liège on a three-year contract.

== Honours ==
Standard Liège

- Belgian First Division A: 2007–08, 2008–09
- Belgian Super Cup: 2008, 2009
