= Marco Ingrao =

Belgian-Italian footballer

Personal information
- Full name: Marco Ingrao
- Date of birth: 26 July 1982 (age 44)
- Place of birth: Agrigento, Italy
- Height: 1.85 m (6 ft 1 in)
- Position: Left back

Youth career
- RFC Liège

Senior career*
Years	Team	Apps	(Gls)
1998–1999	RFC Liège		
1999–2004	Racing Genk	44	(2)
2004–2006	Mons	21	(1)
2006	→ Vicenza (loan)	1	(0)
2006–2007	Lierse	13	(0)
2007–2009	Standard Liège	14	(0)
2010–2012	MVV	7	(0)
2012	AS Eupen	0	(0)
2012–2013	RCS Verviétois	12	(1)
- * Club domestic league appearances and goals as of 6 December 2015

Marco Ingrao (born 26 July 1982 in Agrigento) is a Belgian-Italian professional footballer who last played for RCS Verviétois. He normally plays as left back.

== Honours ==
Standard Liège

- Belgian Super Cup: 2008
