= Jonathan Walasiak =

Belgian footballer

Personal information
- Date of birth: 23 October 1982 (age 44)
- Place of birth: Mons, Belgium
- Height: 1.78 m (5 ft 10 in)
- Position: Midfielder

Youth career
- 1987–1989: RUS Tertre
- 1989–1995: Mons
- 1995–2000: Standard de Liège

Senior career*
Years	Team	Apps	(Gls)
2000–2008	Standard de Liège	120	(6)
2006–2007	→ FC Metz (loan)	1	(0)
2008–2009	R.E. Mouscron	29	(2)
2010	Győr		
2010–2011	Royal Francs Borains		
2011–2014	Albert Quévy-Mons		

International career
2003–2005	Belgium	4	(0)
- * Club domestic league appearances and goals

Jonathan Walasiak (born 23 October 1982 in Mons) is a Belgian football player who has been in the national team. He last played for Royal Albert Quévy-Mons and is a right midfielder.

== Career ==
Walasiak played professional football in Belgium and Hungary, beginning his career at Standard.
