= Milan Jovanović (footballer, born 1981) =

Serbian footballer (born 1981)

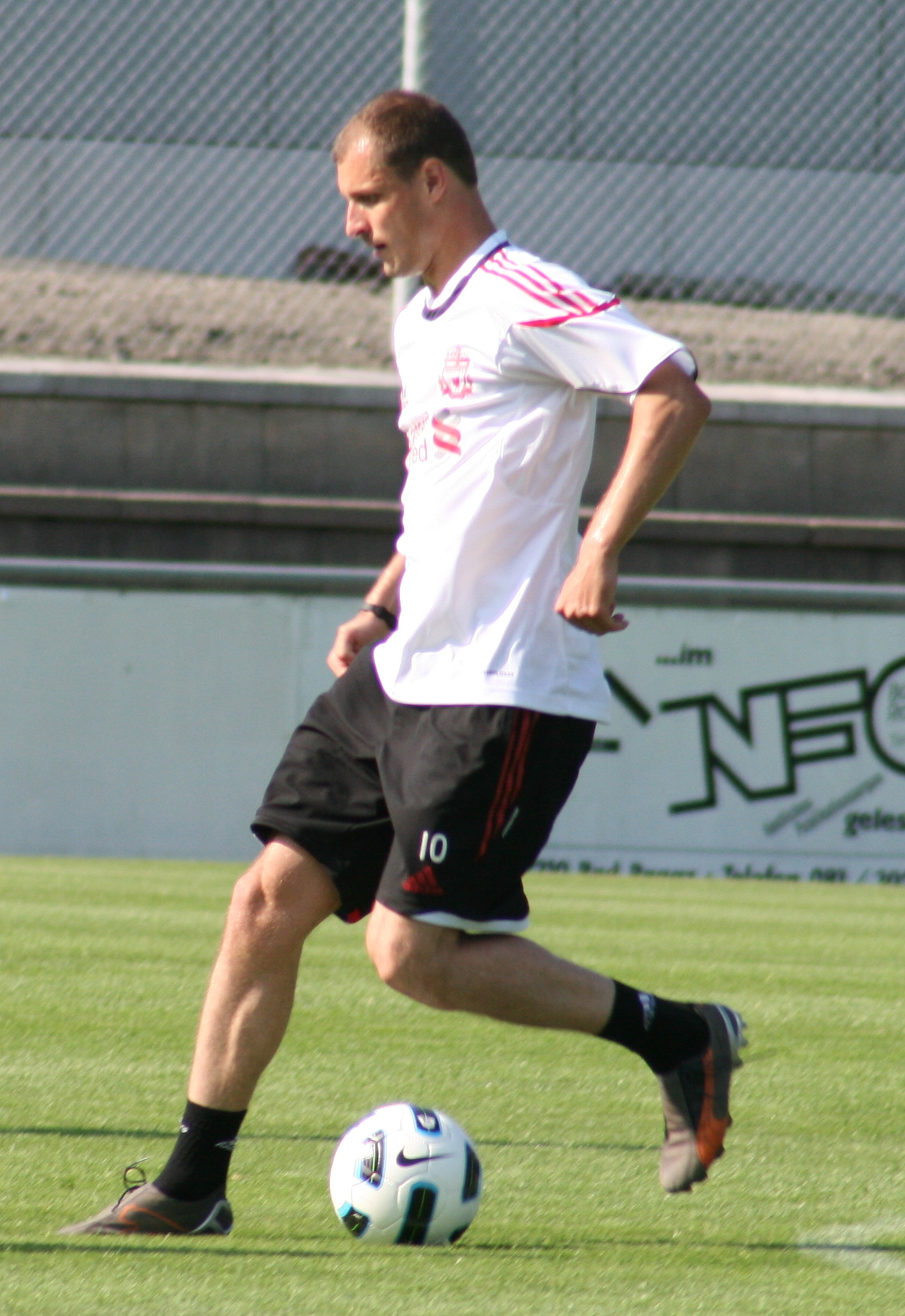
- Jovanović with Liverpool in 2010

Personal information
- Full name: Milan Jovanović
- Date of birth: 18 April 1981 (age 45)
- Place of birth: Bajina Bašta, SR Serbia, SFR Yugoslavia
- Height: 1.83 m (6 ft 0 in)
- Positions: Forward; winger

Youth career
- Kosmos Bajina Bašta
- 1999: Budućnost Valjevo

Senior career*
Years	Team	Apps	(Gls)
1999–2003	Vojvodina	43	(10)
2003–2004	Shakhtar Donetsk	6	(1)
2003	→ Shakhtar-2 Donetsk	1	(0)
2004–2006	Lokomotiv Moscow	3	(0)
2006–2010	Standard Liège	116	(52)
2010–2011	Liverpool	10	(0)
2011–2013	Anderlecht	68	(17)
Total		247	(80)

International career
2007–2012	Serbia	44	(11)
- * Club domestic league appearances and goals

Milan Jovanović (Serbian Cyrillic: Милан Јовановић; born 18 April 1981) is a Serbian former professional footballer who played as a forward or winger.

He began his career with FK Vojvodina and had brief spells at Shakhtar Donetsk and Lokomotiv Moscow before joining Standard Liège, where he was named Belgian Pro League player of the year in 2008 and Belgian Golden Shoe the following year. In 2010–11, he spent the season at Liverpool before returning to Belgium afterwards to spend the rest of his career at Anderlecht.

Jovanović earned 44 caps for the Serbia national team from his debut in 2007, and scored 11 international goals. Coach Radomir Antić created a wing-tandem with Jovanović and Miloš Krasić which is remembered as the best wing-partnership in the modern history of the Serbia national team. He represented Serbia at the 2010 FIFA World Cup. He is commonly referred to by his nickname Lane.

== Early life ==
Son of Stamenko and Gordana, Jovanović was born and raised in Bajina Bašta before moving to Valjevo, Novi Sad, and Belgrade in pursuit of a football career. He played in the youth teams of FK Kosmos Bajina Bašta and FK Budućnost Valjevo.

== Club career ==
=== Early career ===
Jovanović came to make his debut with FK Vojvodina during the 1999–2000 season. He then played at Shakhtar Donetsk and Lokomotiv Moscow, before arriving at Standard Liège in 2006.

=== Standard Liège ===
At Standard Liège, Jovanović quickly became a fan favourite, scoring 14 goals in his first season and earning the nickname "the snake" for his fast movement. Another two highly successful seasons in Belgium followed, with Jovanović turning down a move to Spanish giants Real Madrid in 2009 because he was worried he would not play regularly. Jovanović was hugely successful in Belgium and on 13 January 2010, was named as the Jupiler League's Player of the Year. However, the year after, Standard Liege ended the season at the 8th position, with Jovanović managing to score 10 goals in his last season in Belgium.

=== Liverpool ===
Jovanović joined English Premier League club Liverpool on 8 July 2010 on a free transfer. There had been speculation he would renege on the pre-contract agreement that he had signed after Liverpool manager Rafael Benítez resigned in June 2010: Benítez was reported to be anxious to bring the player to his new club Inter Milan, but Jovanović confirmed his intention to honour his contract, and was given squad number 14.

On 29 July 2010, Jovanović made his competitive debut for Roy Hodgson's Liverpool, starting in a 2–0 away win against FK Rabotnički in the Europa League and made his home debut in the second leg. He went on to make his Premier League debut on 15 August 2010, against Arsenal in a 1–1 draw at Anfield. He scored his first goal for Liverpool in the League Cup tie against League Two side Northampton Town at Anfield on 22 September. After Kenny Dalglish took over as Liverpool manager in early 2011, Jovanović was rarely called upon, occasionally not even being named to the bench.

=== Anderlecht ===
In August 2011, Jovanović moved to Belgian club Anderlecht, signing a two-year contract. On 17 March 2013 Jovanović scored a stunning goal against KAA Gent, where he chested the ball forward before kicking the airborne ball from over 20 meters out into the upper right corner of the goal. In his time at Anderlecht, he scored 23 goals in 69 league games. In the summer of 2013, he did not renew his contract with Anderlecht. He returned to Serbia that summer and trained in Novi Sad, prompting journalists to speculate a Bosman move to FK Vojvodina. However, he did not sign a contract with Vojvodina and remained off the radar of professional football after his departure from Anderlecht.

== International career ==
Jovanović made his debut for the Serbia national team against Finland on 2 June 2007. Serbia won the match 2–0, with Jovanović scoring Serbia's second goal. Jovanović was Serbia's top scorer in 2010 FIFA World Cup qualifying. On 21 May 2010, he was included by coach Radomir Antić in Serbia's initial 23-man squad for the 2010 FIFA World Cup. On 18 June 2010, Jovanović scored his first goal in the FIFA World Cup, against Germany in a Group D match, which Serbia won 1–0. In the same match, Jovanović allegedly had a humorous exchange with Marko Marin, who was born in Bosnia and Herzegovina; Marin admitted that when he substituted Thomas Müller in the 70th minute, Jovanović told him jokingly to "run slower" so as to let Serbia hold on to the 1–0 lead.

== In popular culture ==
In October 2011, Jovanović was mentioned in the Australian soap opera Neighbours, where he was described by Andrew Robinson as "one of the greatest soccer players in the world." Several commentators in the English-speaking football community expressed surprise at this statement.

== Personal life ==
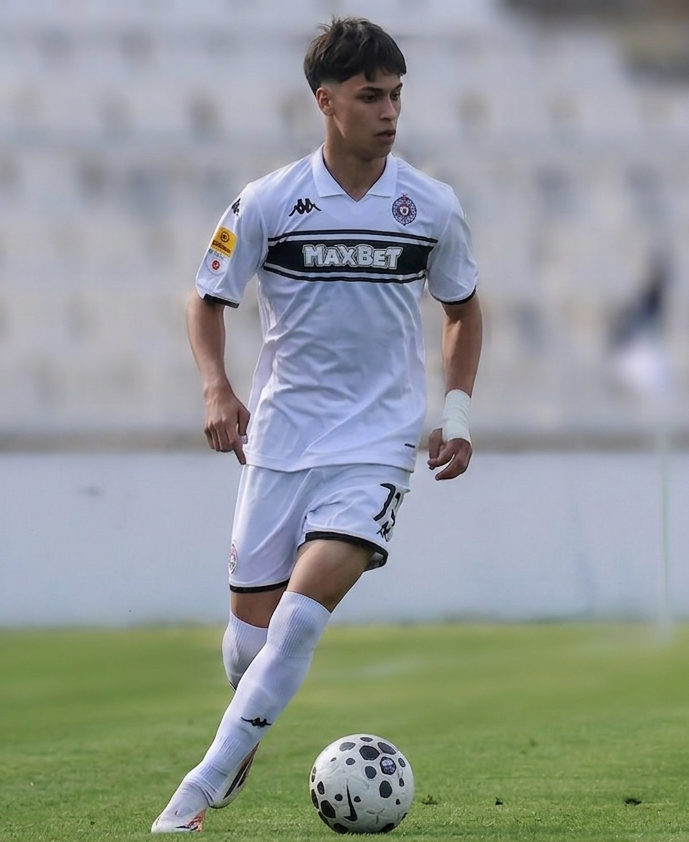
Jovanović's youngest son, Dusan.

He is married to Nataša and has three sons named Lazar, Dušan, and Miloš.

== Career statistics ==
=== Club ===
Appearances and goals by club, season and competition
Club	Season	League			Cup		League Cup		Continental		Other		Total	
Club	Season	Division	Apps	Goals	Apps	Goals	Apps	Goals	Apps	Goals	Apps	Goals	Apps	Goals
Shakhtar Donetsk	2002–03	Ukrainian Premier League	6	1	1	0	—		0	0	0	0	7	1
Shakhtar Donetsk	2003–04	Ukrainian Premier League	0	0	2	1	—		0	0	0	0	2	1
Shakhtar Donetsk	Total		6	1	3	1	—		0	0	0	0	9	2
Lokomotiv Moscow	2004	Russian Premier League	3	0	1	0	—		0	0	0	0	4	0
Lokomotiv Moscow	2005	Russian Premier League	0	0	0	0	—		0	0	0	0	0	0
Lokomotiv Moscow	Total		3	0	1	0	—		0	0	0	0	4	0
Standard Liège	2006–07	Belgian First Division	29	14	6	9	—		4	1	0	0	39	24
Standard Liège	2007–08	Belgian First Division	31	16	4	2	—		1	0	0	0	36	18
Standard Liège	2008–09	Belgian First Division	30	12	0	0	—		8	2	2	0	40	14
Standard Liège	2009–10	Belgian First Division	26	10	0	0	—		11	3	1	0	38	13
Standard Liège	Total		116	52	10	11	—		24	6	3	0	153	69
Liverpool	2010–11	Premier League	10	0	0	0	1	1	7	1	0	0	18	2
Anderlecht	2011–12	Belgian Pro League	35	9	0	0	—		9	3	0	0	44	12
Anderlecht	2012–13	Belgian Pro League	33	8	5	2	—		7	2	1	0	46	12
Anderlecht	Total		68	17	5	2	—		16	5	1	0	90	24
Career total			203	70	19	15	1	1	47	12	4	0	274	98

=== International ===
Appearances and goals by national team and year
National team	Year	Apps	Goals
Serbia	2007	6	1
Serbia	2008	5	3
Serbia	2009	12	5
Serbia	2010	10	1
Serbia	2011	9	1
Serbia	2012	2	0
Total		44	11

Scores and results list Serbia's goal tally first, score column indicates score after each Jovanović goal.

List of international goals scored by Milan Jovanović
No.	Date	Venue	Opponent	Score	Result	Competition
1	2 June 2007	Helsinki Olympic Stadium, Helsinki, Finland	Finland	2–0	2–0	Euro 2008 qualification
2	15 October 2008	Ernst-Happel-Stadion, Vienna, Austria	Austria	2–0	3–1	2010 World Cup qualification
3	19 November 2008	Stadion FK Partizan, Beograd, Serbia	Bulgaria	1–0	6–1	Friendly
4	19 November 2008	Stadion FK Partizan, Beograd, Serbia	Bulgaria	2–1	6–1	Friendly
5	10 February 2009	GSP Stadium, Nicosia, Cyprus	Cyprus	1–0	2–0	Friendly
6	28 March 2009	Stadionul Farul, Constanţa, Romania	Romania	1–0	3–2	2010 World Cup qualification
7	10 June 2009	Tórsvøllur, Tórshavn, Faroe Islands	Faroe Islands	1–0	2–0	2010 World Cup qualification
8	10 October 2009	Stadion FK Crvena zvezda, Beograd, Serbia	Romania	4–0	5–0	2010 World Cup qualification
9	10 October 2009	Stadion FK Crvena zvezda, Beograd, Serbia	Romania	5–0	5–0	2010 World Cup qualification
10	18 June 2010	Nelson Mandela Bay Stadium, Port Elizabeth, South Africa	Germany	1–0	1–0	2010 FIFA World Cup
11	6 September 2011	Stadion FK Partizan, Belgrade, Serbia	Faroe Islands	1–0	3–1	Euro 2012 qualification

== Honours ==
Shakhtar Donetsk

- Ukrainian Cup: 2003–04

Lokomotiv Moscow

- Russian Premier League: 2004

Standard Liège

- Belgian First Division: 2007–08, 2008–09
- Belgian Super Cup: 2008, 2009

Anderlecht

- Belgian Pro League: 2011–12, 2012–13
- Belgian Super Cup: 2012

Individual

- Belgian Footballer of the Year: 2007–08
- Belgian Golden Shoe: 2009
