= Bart Van Den Eede =

Belgian footballer

Personal information
- Date of birth: 3 November 1977 (age 49)
- Place of birth: Hamme, Belgium
- Height: 1.92 m (6 ft 4 in)
- Position: Forward

Youth career
- VK Robur Moerzeke
- Racing Mechelen

Senior career*
Years	Team	Apps	(Gls)
1994–2000	Beveren	113	(30)
2000–2002	Den Bosch	65	(37)
2002–2003	NAC Breda	23	(2)
2003–2004	Willem II	26	(6)
2004	NAC Breda	13	(0)
2005–2006	NEC	20	(5)
2006–2008	Westerlo	33	(9)
2008–2010	Dender	19	(2)
2010	→ Eindhoven (loan)	12	(2)
2010–2011	Mariekerke		
Total		325	(103)
- * Club domestic league appearances and goals

Bart Van Den Eede (born 3 November 1977) is a Belgian former professional footballer who played as a forward for Beveren, FC Den Bosch, NAC Breda, Willem II, NEC, Westerlo, Dender, Eindhoven and Mariekerke.
