= 2007–08 Belgian First Division =

105th season of top-tier football in Belgium

Belgian First Division
- Season: 2007–08
- Champions: Standard Liège
- Relegated: Sint-Truidense; Brussels
- Champions League: Standard Liège; Anderlecht
- UEFA Cup: Club Brugge; Gent
- Matches: 306
- Goals: 795 (2.6 per match)
- Top goalscorer: Joseph Akpala; Elyaniv Barda; Milan Jovanović; Mbaye Leye; Sanharib Malki (16 each)

The 2007–08 season of the Belgian First Division began on August 3, 2007, and concluded on May 10, 2008. The championship was decided in the 31st round on April 20, 2008, when Standard Liège beat Anderlecht 2–0 at home. For Standard it was their 9th League Championship, but just their first in the last 25 years. At the other end of the table, Brussels and Sint-Truiden were relegated on matchdays 31 and 32 respectively. Behind Standard, Anderlecht and Club Brugge fought until the end for the second place which gives right to a place in the qualifying rounds of the 2008–09 UEFA Champions League. On the penultimate matchday, Anderlecht won against Club Brugge with 2–0 which proved decisive in the end for them to become second.

== Clubs ==
Eighteen teams played in the Belgian First Division season 2007–08. Twelve teams were from Flanders, four clubs from Wallonia and two clubs from the Brussels-Capital Region.

=== New teams ===
K.S.K. Beveren had been relegated at the end of the previous season with F. C. Verbroedering Dender E.H. replacing them as they won the Belgian Second Division. Lierse lost their spot during the promotion playoff and were replaced by Y.R. K.V. Mechelen.

=== Overview ===
Location of teams in Belgian First Division 2007–08

Club	Location	Current manager	2007–08 season managers
R.S.C. Anderlecht	Anderlecht	(Belgium) Ariel Jacobs	(Belgium) Franky Vercauteren
K.R.C. Genk	Genk	(Belgium) Ronny Van Geneugden (caretaker)	(Belgium) Hugo Broos
Standard Liège	Liège	(Belgium) Michel Preud'homme	none
K.A.A. Gent	Ghent	(Norway) Trond Sollied	none
R. Charleroi S.C.	Charleroi	(Belgium) Thierry Siquet	(Belgium) Philippe Van de Walle
Club Brugge	Bruges	(Belgium) Jacky Mathijssen	none
K.F.C. Germinal Beerschot	Antwerp	(Belgium) Harm van Veldhoven	none
K.V.C. Westerlo	Westerlo	(Belgium) Jan Ceulemans	none
R.A.E.C. Mons	Mons	(France) Albert Cartier	(Belgium) José Riga
R.E. Mouscron	Mouscron	(Belgium) Enzo Scifo	(Belgium) Marc Brys, (Belgium) Geert Broeckaert (caretaker)
K.S.V. Roeselare	Roeselare	(Belgium) Dirk Geeraerd	none
Cercle Brugge K.S.V.	Bruges	(Belgium) Glen De Boeck	none
F.C. Molenbeek Brussels Strombeek	Sint-Jans-Molenbeek	(Belgium) Franky Van Der Elst	(France) Albert Cartier, (Belgium) Edy De Bolle (caretaker)
S.V. Zulte-Waregem	Waregem	(Belgium) Francky Dury	none
K. Sint-Truidense V.V.	Sint-Truiden	(Netherlands) Dennis Van Wijk	(Belgium) Valère Billen, (Belgium) Peter Voets (caretaker)
K.S.C. Lokeren Oost-Vlaanderen	Lokeren	(Belgium) Georges Leekens	none
F. C. Verbroedering Dender E.H.	Denderleeuw	(Netherlands) Johan Boskamp	(Belgium) Jean-Pierre Vande Velde, (Belgium) Patrick Asselman (caretaker)
Y.R. K.V. Mechelen	Mechelen	(Belgium) Peter Maes	none

== Managerial changes ==
Team	Outgoing manager	Manner of departure	Date of vacancy	Replaced by	Date of appointment
Sint-Truiden	(Belgium) Valère Billen	Quit	18 September 2007	(Belgium) Peter Voets (caretaker)	18 September 2007
Anderlecht	(Belgium) Franky Vercauteren	Mutual consent	12 November 2007	(Belgium) Ariel Jacobs	12 November 2007
Dender EH	(Belgium) Jean-Pierre Vande Velde	Mutual consent	19 November 2007	(Netherlands) Johan Boskamp	27 November 2007
Charleroi	(Belgium) Philippe Van de Walle	Quit	10 December 2007	(Belgium) Thierry Siquet	10 December 2007
Sint-Truiden	(Belgium) Peter Voets	Caretaker replaced	10 December 2007	(Netherlands) Dennis Van Wijk	10 December 2007
Mouscron	(Belgium) Marc Brys	Fired	17 December 2007	(Belgium) Geert Broeckaert (caretaker)	17 December 2007
Brussels	(France) Albert Cartier	Fired	22 December 2007	(Belgium) Edy De Bolle (caretaker)	22 December 2007
Mouscron	(Belgium) Geert Broeckaert	Caretaker replaced	27 December 2007	(Belgium) Enzo Scifo	27 December 2007
Brussels	(Belgium) Edy De Bolle	Caretaker replaced	24 January 2008	(Belgium) Franky Van Der Elst	24 January 2008
Mons	(Belgium) José Riga	Fired	27 January 2008	(France) Albert Cartier	28 January 2008
Genk	(Belgium) Hugo Broos	Fired	23 February 2008	(Belgium) Ronny Van Geneugden (caretaker)	23 February 2008

== Kits ==
Team	Kit maker	Shirt sponsor	Notes
Anderlecht	Adidas	Fortis	
Genk	Airness	Euphony, Carglass and Vasco	Other sponsor: Asap.be
Standard	Umbro	BASE,TNT	
Gent	Jako	VDK	
Charleroi	Errea	VOO, Champion	
Club Brugge	Puma	Dexia	
Germinal Beerschot	Legea	Quick	
Westerlo	Saller	Willy Naessens Industriebouw	Side sponsors: Sika, Veralu, Gouden Gids, ING, Netex
Mons	Jako	Holcim	Side sponsors: SGI, Foruminvest
Mouscron	Errea	Frinver	Side sponsors: O2XA, Renault Mouscron
Roeselare	Joma	Deceuninck	Side sponsors: Alheembouw, Molecule, Vanheede
Cercle Brugge	Masita	Vacansoleil	Side sponsors: Vaillant, Renault Denoyel, Soncotra, Oud Brugge, The city of Bruges
Brussels	Jartazi	Vermeersch Construct and Kia Motors	Side sponsors: Crefibel, Tonissteiner, Verabel, Alno
Zulte-Waregem	Lotto	BIK Woningen NV	Side sponsors: Nollens Poultry, Stortbeton Declerq, Euphony, Mink, Giks Mode
Sint-Truiden	Umbro	Belisol	Side sponsors: Radson, Start People
Lokeren	Jartazi	Edialux	Side sponsors: DCM, Q-Team-VP-Lambrecht, Start People, vitrine.be, Garage Van Winckel, Van De Walle Industriebouw, Pingy
Dender	Nike	De Doncker, Van Roy	
Mechelen	Nike	Telenet	Side sponsors: Veolia Environnement, Krefima, Gybels, United Brands

== Stadiums ==
Team	Stadium	Capacity
Standard	Stade Maurice Dufrasne	30,000
Cercle Brugge	Jan Breydel Stadium	29,415
Club Brugge	Jan Breydel Stadium	29,415
Anderlecht	Constant Vanden Stock Stadium	28,063
Charleroi	Stade du Pays de Charleroi	25,000
Genk	Cristal Arena	24,900
Mechelen	Veolia-Stadion	14,145
Gent	Jules Ottenstadion	12,919
Sint-Truiden	Staaienveld	12,491
Brussels	Edmond Machtens Stadium	12,340
Germinal Beerschot	Olympisch Stadion	12,148
Mouscron	Stade Le Canonnier	11,500
Lokeren	Daknamstadion	10,000
Mons	Stade Charles Tondreau	9,504
Roeselare	Schiervelde Stadion	9,036
Zulte-Waregem	Regenboogstadion	8,500
Westerlo	Het Kuipje	8,200
Dender	Florent Beeckmanstadion	6,800

== League standings ==
Pos	Team	Pld	W	D	L	GF	GA	GD	Pts	Qualification or relegation
1	Standard Liège (C)	34	22	11	1	61	19	+42	77	Qualification to Champions League third qualifying round
2	Anderlecht	34	21	7	6	59	31	+28	70	Qualification to Champions League second qualifying round
3	Club Brugge	34	20	7	7	45	30	+15	67	Qualification to UEFA Cup first round
4	Cercle Brugge	34	17	9	8	62	33	+29	60	
5	Germinal Beerschot	34	16	7	11	46	34	+12	55	Qualification to Intertoto Cup second round
6	Gent	34	14	10	10	57	46	+11	52	Qualification to UEFA Cup second qualifying round
7	Zulte Waregem	34	13	8	13	47	54	−7	47	
8	Charleroi	34	13	7	14	41	45	−4	46	
9	Westerlo	34	12	9	13	43	37	+6	45	
10	Genk	34	12	9	13	54	55	−1	45	
11	Mouscron	34	12	6	16	38	43	−5	42	
12	Lokeren	34	9	15	10	32	33	−1	42	
13	Mechelen	34	10	10	14	45	52	−7	40	
14	Roeselare	34	9	11	14	36	55	−19	38	
15	Dender	34	9	6	19	33	59	−26	33	
16	Mons	34	7	12	15	37	45	−8	33	
17	Sint-Truiden (R)	34	6	9	19	32	58	−26	27	Relegation to 2008–09 Belgian Second Division
18	Brussels (R)	34	4	7	23	27	66	−39	19	Relegation to 2008–09 Belgian Second Division

Source: Jupiler League
Rules for classification: 1) points; 2) number of matches won; if teams are still tied a playoff is organised.
(C) Champions; (R) Relegated

== Results ==
Home \ Away	AND	GBA	CER	BRU	CHA	DEN	GNK	GNT	LOK	KVM	FCB	MON	MOU	ROE	STA	STV	WES	ZWA
Anderlecht		2–0	3–1	2–0	0–1	1–0	1–0	2–1	1–0	1–0	3–0	3–2	2–1	5–0	0–0	4–1	3–1	2–2
Germinal Beerschot	2–0		3–0	0–1	1–0	1–0	1–2	2–2	1–1	4–3	3–0	2–0	3–0	2–0	1–2	2–1	0–2	0–0
Cercle Brugge	0–0	1–1		1–2	3–1	3–0	5–1	4–1	3–2	2–0	0–0	0–0	3–0	0–0	0–0	5–1	1–0	2–0
Club Brugge	1–0	3–0	1–0		0–2	2–0	2–6	0–0	1–1	2–0	1–0	2–1	1–0	1–0	1–2	3–2	4–0	1–0
Charleroi	0–2	0–0	1–3	1–1		1–0	3–1	1–2	1–0	1–0	1–0	3–1	1–3	1–1	2–1	1–1	1–1	2–3
Dender	2–2	1–2	2–4	1–0	2–4		2–0	0–3	0–1	0–3	1–1	0–3	0–3	2–1	0–0	1–0	2–0	2–1
Genk	1–1	1–3	3–1	1–2	1–0	2–0		3–3	2–3	2–1	2–1	1–2	3–1	0–0	0–2	0–1	1–0	5–2
Gent	2–3	2–1	3–2	0–0	2–1	2–4	5–0		4–2	4–1	1–0	2–0	2–0	1–1	1–1	2–3	1–1	1–1
Lokeren	0–0	0–0	1–1	0–1	1–0	1–0	1–1	1–1		3–1	0–1	1–2	0–0	3–0	0–0	2–1	1–1	0–0
Mechelen	0–1	1–2	0–4	1–1	1–0	2–2	2–2	1–0	1–1		4–0	2–0	2–2	4–3	0–1	2–3	1–0	2–1
Brussels	2–4	1–2	1–4	1–3	1–2	4–1	0–5	0–2	2–0	2–2		1–1	0–2	0–0	0–1	2–0	0–1	1–2
Mons	1–2	0–0	0–2	0–1	0–0	2–2	1–1	4–0	0–1	1–1	2–1		2–0	1–1	1–1	0–0	1–3	3–0
Mouscron	1–2	1–0	1–0	2–0	3–1	2–1	1–1	1–4	2–0	0–1	1–1	3–1		1–3	0–0	0–0	1–2	0–2
Roeselare	2–2	1–0	0–2	1–2	1–2	3–1	0–0	0–1	1–1	2–2	2–0	4–3	2–1		0–4	2–0	0–2	3–2
Standard Liège	2–0	3–1	4–1	2–1	5–1	3–0	3–1	0–0	1–0	2–2	4–1	2–0	1–0	0–0		2–1	2–1	3–1
Sint-Truiden	4–3	0–3	0–0	1–1	1–3	1–2	1–2	2–1	1–1	0–1	1–1	1–1	0–2	0–1	0–0		0–2	2–1
Westerlo	0–2	1–2	1–1	0–0	1–0	0–0	2–1	2–0	1–2	1–1	7–2	0–0	0–2	6–0	1–3	2–0		1–1
Zulte Waregem	1–0	2–1	0–3	2–3	2–2	1–2	2–2	2–1	1–1	2–0	1–0	2–1	2–1	3–1	1–4	3–2	1–0	

Source: Jupiler League
Legend: Blue = home team win; Yellow = draw; Red = away team win.

== Season statistics ==
=== Scoring ===
- First goal of the season: Marcin Wasilewski for Anderlecht against Mechelen (3 August 2007)
- Widest winning margin: 6: Westerlo 6–0 Roeselare (20 October 2007)
- Most goals in a match: 9: Westerlo 7–2 Brussels (19 January 2008)
- Best offensive team: Cercle Brugge with 62 goals.
- Best defensive team: Standard Liège with 19 goals.
- Hattricks scored:
  - Milan Jovanović for Standard Liège against Brussels (11 August 2007)
  - Milan Jovanović for Standard Liège against Roeselare (25 August 2007)
  - Joseph Akpala for Charleroi against Sint-Truiden (26 August 2007)
  - Bertin Tomou for Mouscron against Dender EH (27 October 2007)
  - Bryan Ruiz for Gent against Lokeren (8 December 2007)
  - Elyaniv Barda for Genk against Zulte-Waregem (14 December 2007)
  - Bart Van Den Eede for Westerlo against Brussels (19 January 2008)
  - Joseph Akpala for Charleroi against Genk (12 April 2008)
  - Nicolás Frutos for Anderlecht against Sint-Truiden (26 April 2008)

=== Cards ===
- First yellow card: Nicolas Pareja for Anderlecht against Mechelen (3 August 2007)
- First red card: Wim Mennes for Westerlo against Brussels (4 August 2007)

== Top goal scorers ==
As of May 6, 2008:

	Player	Team	Goals
1	Joseph Akpala (NGA)	Charleroi	16
=	Elyaniv Barda (ISR)	Genk	16
=	Milan Jovanović (SRB)	Standard Liège	16
=	Mbaye Leye (SEN)	Zulte Waregem	16
=	Sanharib Malki (SYR)	Germinal Beerschot	16
6	Dieumerci Mbokani (COD)	Standard Liège	15
7	Mahamadou Dissa (MLI)	Roeselare	14
8	Aloys Nong (CMR)	YR KV Mechelen	13
9	Dominic Foley (IRL)	Gent	11
=	Bryan Ruiz (CRI)	Gent	11
=	François Sterchele (BEL) †	Club Brugge	11
=	Bertin Tomou (CMR)	Mouscron	11

† François Sterchele died on May 8, 2008, in a car crash and thus did not complete the full season.

== Attendances ==
No.	Club	Average
1	Club Brugge	26,368
2	Standard de Liège	25,785
3	Anderlecht	24,911
4	Genk	23,271
5	Mechelen	11,143
6	Gent	10,690
7	Cercle Brugge	10,101
8	Germinal Beerschot	9,868
9	Charleroi	9,393
10	STVV	7,824
11	Zulte Waregem	6,704
12	Roeselare	6,096
13	Westerlo	5,941
14	Excelsior Mouscron	5,841
15	Lokeren	5,804
16	Brussels	5,219
17	Dender	4,672
18	RAEC	4,647

== See also ==
- 2007–08 R.S.C. Anderlecht season
