= 2008–09 Belgian First Division =

106th season of top-tier football in Belgium

Jupiler Pro League
- Season: 2008–09
- Champions: Standard Liège
- Relegated: Dender; Tubize; Mons
- Champions League: Standard Liège; Anderlecht
- Europa League: Club Brugge; Gent; Genk
- Matches: 306
- Goals: 855 (2.79 per match)
- Top goalscorer: Jaime Alfonso Ruiz (17 goals)

The 2008–09 season of the Belgian First Division (also known as Jupiler Pro League after a sponsor) was the 106th season of top-tier football in Belgium. The regular season began on 16 August 2008 and ended on 16 May 2009. Standard Liège were the defending champions.

On 19 April 2009, Mons were relegated after Dender beat Roeselare 3–1 and made it mathematically impossible for Mons to climb into 16th position or higher. Tubize were relegated on 3 May 2009 after a 1–1 draw at home to Anderlecht.

The 2008–09 champions were decided in a playoff because Standard and Anderlecht finished the regular season equal on points and number of wins. Standard won the playoff by 2–1 on aggregate and thereby retained the title.

Location of teams in Belgian First Division 2008–09

== Participating teams ==
The league consisted of 18 teams, the best 16 teams from last season and two promoted teams from the Second Division.

The number of participants was reduced to 16 teams the season after, hence relegation was increased from two to three or four teams.

=== Team changes from the previous season ===
Sint-Truidense and Brussels were relegated to the Second Division at the end of the previous season after finishing in the last two places. They were replaced by Second Division champions Kortrijk and promotion playoff winners Tubize.

=== Overview ===
Club	Location	Current manager	Team captain	Stadium	Capacity
Standard Liège	Liège	(Romania) László Bölöni	(Belgium) Steven Defour	Stade Maurice Dufrasne	30,000
R.S.C. Anderlecht	Anderlecht	(Belgium) Ariel Jacobs	(Belgium) Olivier Deschacht	Constant Vanden Stock Stadium	28,063
Club Brugge KV	Bruges	(Belgium) Jacky Mathijssen	(Belgium) Philippe Clement	Jan Breydel Stadium	29,415
Cercle Brugge K.S.V.	Bruges	(Belgium) Glen De Boeck	(Belgium) Denis Viane	Jan Breydel Stadium	29,415
K.F.C. Germinal Beerschot	Antwerp	(Belgium) Aimé Anthuenis	(Colombia) Daniel Cruz	Olympisch Stadion	12,148
K.A.A. Gent	Ghent	(Belgium) Michel Preud'homme	(Costa Rica) Bryan Ruiz	Jules Ottenstadion	12,919
S.V. Zulte Waregem	Waregem	(Belgium) Francky Dury	(Belgium) Ludwin Van Nieuwenhuyze	Regenboogstadion	8,500
R. Charleroi S.C.	Charleroi	(Scotland) John Collins	(Belgium) Frank Defays	Stade du Pays de Charleroi	25,000
K.V.C. Westerlo	Westerlo	(Belgium) Jan Ceulemans	(Belgium) Jef Delen	Het Kuipje	8,200
K.R.C. Genk	Genk	(Belgium) Pierre Denier and (Netherlands) Hans Visser (caretakers)	(Belgium) Hans Cornelis	Cristal Arena	24,900
R.E. Mouscron	Mouscron	(Belgium) Enzo Scifo	(Belgium) Gonzague van Dooren	Stade Le Canonnier	11,500
K.S.C. Lokeren Oost-Vlaanderen	Lokeren	(Serbia) Aleksandar Janković	(Belgium) Olivier Doll	Daknamstadion	10,000
KV Mechelen	Mechelen	(Belgium) Peter Maes	(Belgium) Jonas Ivens	Veolia-Stadion	14,145
K.S.V. Roeselare	Roeselare	(Netherlands) Dennis Van Wijk	(Belgium) Stefaan Tanghe	Schiervelde Stadion	9,036
F.C. Verbroedering Dender E.H.	Denderleeuw	(Netherlands) Johan Boskamp	(Belgium) Steven de Petter	Florent Beeckmanstadion	6,800
R.A.E.C. Mons	Mons	(Belgium) Christophe Dessy (caretaker)	(Italy) Roberto Mirri	Stade Charles Tondreau	9,504
K.V. Kortrijk	Kortrijk	(Belgium) Hein Vanhaezebrouck	(Belgium) Stéphane Demets	Guldensporen Stadion	8,770
A.F.C. Tubize	Tubize	(France) Albert Cartier	(Belgium) Gregory Neels	Stade Leburton	4,000

=== Managerial changes ===
==== During summer break ====
Team	Outgoing manager	Manner of departure	Date of vacancy	Replaced by	Date of appointment	Position in table
Mons	(France) Albert Cartier	Mutual consent	11 May 2008	(Belgium) Philippe Saint-Jean	6 June 2008	Pre-Season
Gent	(Norway) Trond Sollied	Resigned	18 May 2008	(Belgium) Michel Preud'homme	27 May 2008	Pre-Season
Standard Liège	(Belgium) Michel Preud'homme	End of contract	26 May 2008	(Romania) László Bölöni	9 June 2008	Pre-Season
Tubize	(Belgium) Philippe Saint-Jean	Resigned	6 June 2008	(France) Albert Cartier	14 June 2008	Pre-Season

==== During the season ====
Team	Outgoing manager	Manner of departure	Date of vacancy	Replaced by	Date of appointment	Position in table
Mons	(Belgium) Philippe Saint-Jean	Resigned	21 August 2008	(Belgium) Thierry Pister (caretaker)	21 August 2008	18th
Roeselare	(Belgium) Dirk Geeraerd	Sacked	26 October 2008	(Netherlands) Dennis van Wijk	29 October 2008	18th
Germinal Beerschot	(Belgium) Harm van Veldhoven	Resigned	13 November 2008	(Belgium) Aimé Anthuenis	14 November 2008	16th
Mons	(Belgium) Thierry Pister (caretaker)	Sacked	4 December 2008	(Belgium) Christophe Dessy (caretaker)	4 December 2008	15th
Charleroi	(Belgium) Thierry Siquet	Sacked	15 December 2008	(Scotland) John Collins	15 December 2008	11th
Genk	(Belgium) Ronny Van Geneugden	Resigned	5 March 2009	(Belgium) Pierre Denier and (Netherlands) Hans Visser (caretakers)	5 March 2009	4th
Lokeren	(Belgium) Georges Leekens	Resigned	31 March 2009	(Serbia) Aleksandar Janković	6 April 2009	7th

== League standings ==
=== Final table ===
Pos	Team	Pld	W	D	L	GF	GA	GD	Pts	Qualification or relegation
1	Standard Liège (C)	34	24	5	5	66	26	+40	77 (Note: The championship was decided in a playoff (see below).)	Qualification to Champions League group stage
2	Anderlecht	34	24	5	5	75	30	+45	77	Qualification to Champions League third qualifying round
3	Club Brugge	34	18	5	11	59	50	+9	59	Qualification to Europa League third qualifying round
4	Gent	34	17	8	9	67	42	+25	59	Qualification to Europa League second qualifying round
5	Zulte Waregem	34	16	7	11	55	36	+19	55	
6	Westerlo	34	15	7	12	42	38	+4	52	
7	Lokeren	34	13	12	9	40	32	+8	51	
8	Genk	34	15	5	14	48	51	−3	50	Qualification to Europa League play-off round (Note: Genk qualified for the play-off round of the UEFA Europa League by winning the 2008–09 Belgian Cup.)
9	Cercle Brugge	34	14	5	15	48	53	−5	47	
10	Mechelen	34	12	10	12	46	52	−6	46	
11	Mouscron	34	12	8	14	42	49	−7	44	
12	Charleroi	34	12	7	15	43	48	−5	43	
13	Germinal Beerschot	34	11	9	14	44	42	+2	42	
14	Kortrijk	34	9	11	14	37	55	−18	38	
15	Dender (R)	34	9	8	17	44	58	−14	35	Qualification to the Relegation play-offs
16	Roeselare (O)	34	8	6	20	33	59	−26	30	Qualification to the Relegation play-offs
17	Tubize (R)	34	7	6	21	35	77	−42	27	Relegation to 2009–10 Belgian Second Division
18	Mons (R)	34	3	10	21	31	57	−26	19	Relegation to 2009–10 Belgian Second Division

Source: soccerway.com
Rules for classification: 1) points; 2) number of matches won; if teams are still tied a playoff is organised.
(C) Champions; (O) Play-off winners; (R) Relegated

=== Championship playoff ===
Since Anderlecht and Standard were tied on both points and wins, a two-legged playoff was played in order to determine the league champions. Standard won the playoff 2–1 on aggregate and were crowned champions.

21 May 2009
20:30 CEST

Anderlecht	1 – 1	Standard
Legear 52'	Report (in Dutch)	Mbokani 60'

Constant Vanden Stock Stadium, Anderlecht, Brussels
Referee: Johan Verbist

24 May 2009
20:30 CEST

Standard	1 – 0	Anderlecht
Witsel 40' (pen.)	Report (in Dutch)

Stade Maurice Dufrasne, Liège
Referee: Paul Allaerts

=== Positions by matchday ===
Note: The classification was made after the weekend of each matchday, so postponed matches were only processed at the time they were played to represent the real evolution in standings. These postponed matches are:

- Matchday 1: Mechelen vs. Club Brugge (played between 4th and 5th matchday)
- Matchday 2: Club Brugge vs. Zulte-Waregem (played between 8th and 9th matchday)
- Matchday 13: Kortrijk vs. Zulte-Waregem (played between 16th and 17th matchday)
- Matchday 19: Gent vs. Anderlecht (played between 22nd and 23rd matchday)

Team ╲ Round	1	2	3	4	5	6	7	8	9	10	11	12	13	14	15	16	17	18	19	20	21	22	23	24	25	26	27	28	29	30	31	32	33	34
Standard Liège	3	1	4	3	2	1	2	1	2	4	2	2	2	3	3	2	2	2	1	1	1	1	2	2	2	1	2	2	2	2	2	2	2	1
Anderlecht	2	4	2	2	1	2	1	3	3	2	3	4	3	2	1	1	1	1	2	2	2	2	1	1	1	2	1	1	1	1	1	1	1	2
Club Brugge	12	15	10	10	4	4	3	2	1	1	1	1	1	1	2	3	3	3	3	3	3	3	3	3	3	3	3	3	3	3	3	3	4	3
Gent	1	3	2	4	7	8	10	8	7	5	6	7	9	7	9	10	10	9	11	8	7	8	9	7	5	5	5	5	4	4	4	4	3	4
Zulte Waregem	10	11	7	11	15	11	12	10	9	10	11	11	11	11	10	9	9	11	10	10	8	6	5	5	6	7	8	7	7	5	7	8	5	5
Westerlo	5	8	5	6	6	10	6	6	6	6	4	3	5	5	5	5	6	5	6	6	5	5	6	6	7	6	6	6	6	7	6	5	6	6
Lokeren	10	5	6	8	5	7	9	7	8	8	8	8	6	8	6	6	8	7	7	7	9	9	8	9	8	8	7	8	8	8	8	6	7	7
Genk	8	13	8	5	8	5	5	5	5	3	5	6	4	4	4	4	4	6	4	4	4	4	4	4	4	4	4	4	5	6	5	7	8	8
Cercle Brugge	17	18	12	13	10	12	8	11	12	11	9	9	8	9	8	7	5	4	5	5	6	7	7	8	9	11	12	12	11	9	9	11	9	9
Mechelen	12	16	17	17	14	9	11	13	15	15	15	16	16	16	15	13	13	14	14	14	13	13	13	12	11	10	11	10	10	11	11	10	11	10
Mouscron	4	2	1	1	3	3	4	5	4	7	7	5	7	6	7	8	7	8	8	9	10	10	10	11	12	12	9	9	9	10	10	9	10	11
Charleroi	15	7	11	7	11	14	14	12	11	9	10	10	10	10	11	12	12	12	12	13	14	14	14	14	14	14	13	13	13	13	13	13	13	12
Germinal Beerschot	8	10	15	8	12	15	15	15	16	16	16	17	17	17	16	17	15	13	13	12	12	12	12	10	10	9	10	11	12	12	12	12	12	13
Kortrijk	6	6	9	12	9	6	7	9	10	12	12	13	13	13	12	11	11	10	9	11	11	11	11	13	13	13	14	14	14	15	14	14	15	14
Dender	16	13	16	15	12	16	16	16	15	14	14	12	12	12	14	14	16	17	17	16	16	16	16	15	15	15	15	16	16	14	15	15	14	15
Roeselare	6	12	14	16	17	17	18	18	18	17	18	18	18	18	18	18	18	18	18	18	18	18	17	17	16	16	16	15	15	16	16	16	16	16
Tubize	14	17	18	18	18	18	17	17	17	18	17	15	15	14	17	15	17	15	15	15	15	15	15	16	17	17	17	17	17	17	17	17	17	17
Mons	18	9	13	14	16	13	13	14	14	13	13	14	14	15	13	16	14	16	16	17	17	17	18	18	18	18	18	18	18	18	18	18	18	18

Source: soccerassociation.com

== Results ==
Home \ Away	AND	CER	CHA	BRU	DEN	GNK	GNT	GBA	KVK	LOK	KVM	MON	MOU	ROE	STA	TUB	WES	ZWA
Anderlecht		1–2	2–0	1–0	4–0	2–0	2–2	2–0	4–0	2–3	7–1	3–2	2–1	3–1	4–2	5–1	2–0	2–0
Cercle Brugge	0–3		2–2	1–3	1–2	1–2	3–1	1–0	0–1	0–0	2–1	2–1	0–1	4–3	4–1	4–1	2–1	2–0
Charleroi	0–1	3–2		2–2	2–0	3–0	2–5	0–0	1–2	1–1	1–2	3–0	1–0	1–0	1–0	3–2	1–2	1–0
Club Brugge	1–1	3–1	2–1		1–1	0–2	1–4	3–0	4–1	2–3	3–0	3–2	4–1	2–1	1–4	3–1	2–0	2–0
Dender	0–2	1–0	1–2	0–2		2–4	1–1	0–1	1–0	1–1	1–2	0–0	1–2	3–1	1–3	4–0	2–2	2–0
Genk	0–2	3–2	1–0	0–1	4–3		2–2	1–1	0–1	1–0	2–1	2–0	1–1	1–1	0–0	3–0	1–4	1–2
Gent	1–2	2–1	2–0	3–0	1–1	2–3		1–3	1–1	1–1	1–2	5–0	2–0	4–0	0–1	2–0	2–0	1–0
Germinal Beerschot	1–3	1–1	1–2	2–0	1–1	4–1	2–2		3–0	0–2	3–1	2–0	3–0	3–0	1–3	2–0	2–1	1–2
Kortrijk	1–3	2–1	1–1	2–3	1–2	3–1	0–2	0–0		2–3	0–0	1–0	2–2	2–1	0–2	2–2	0–0	1–0
Lokeren	0–0	1–1	0–0	2–0	0–2	1–2	0–1	1–0	2–0		2–2	0–0	3–0	2–1	1–1	4–1	1–1	2–1
Mechelen	2–1	0–1	2–1	1–1	4–1	2–1	3–3	2–1	1–1	3–0		0–0	2–2	1–2	0–0	0–0	1–3	0–2
Mons	1–2	1–1	1–1	1–2	5–2	3–1	1–2	0–0	1–1	0–2	0–1		0–0	2–0	0–1	1–1	0–2	2–2
Mouscron	1–1	0–1	2–1	5–1	0–2	1–2	4–2	3–1	1–0	2–0	3–1	3–2		2–0	0–3	1–1	0–0	0–2
Roeselare	0–3	1–2	3–1	0–1	2–2	1–0	1–3	2–2	2–2	0–1	1–0	3–2	2–0		1–1	1–2	1–0	0–3
Standard Liège	2–1	4–0	1–2	2–0	3–2	2–0	2–1	3–1	2–0	1–0	4–1	2–1	3–1	3–0		4–0	3–0	1–2
Tubize	1–1	3–0	3–1	1–4	2–1	1–3	0–1	1–0	3–3	2–1	1–5	2–1	1–2	0–1	0–1		1–2	0–6
Westerlo	0–1	1–2	1–0	1–1	3–1	1–0	3–2	1–0	1–3	1–0	0–1	2–1	0–0	1–0	0–1	4–1		3–2
Zulte Waregem	4–0	3–1	4–2	3–1	1–0	1–3	0–2	2–2	5–1	0–0	1–1	3–0	2–1	0–0	0–0	1–0	1–1	

Source: soccerway.com
Legend: Blue = home team win; Yellow = draw; Red = away team win.

== Season statistics ==
=== Scoring ===
- First goal of the season: (Democratic Republic of the Congo) Dieumerci Mbokani for Standard Liège against Dender (16 August 2008)
- Widest winning margin: 6: Anderlecht 7–1 Mechelen (25 October 2008) and Tubize 0–6 Zulte Waregem (21 February 2009)
- Most goals in a match: 8: Anderlecht 7–1 Mechelen (25 October 2008)
- Hat-tricks scored:
  - (France) Idir Ouali for Mouscron against Gent (13 September 2008)
  - (Argentina) Nicolás Frutos for Anderlecht against Mechelen (25 October 2008)
  - (France) Habib Habibou for Charleroi against Tubize (22 November 2008)
  - (France) Jérémy Perbet for Tubize against Kortrijk (29 November 2008)
  - (Bosnia and Herzegovina) Adnan Ćustović for Mouscron against Club Brugge (20 December 2008)
  - (France) Chris Makiese for Zulte Waregem against Kortrijk (18 April 2009)

=== Cards ===
- First yellow card: (Belgium) Jimmy Hempte for Kortrijk against Roeselare (16 August 2008)
- First red card: (France) Karim Belhocine for Kortrijk against Roeselare (16 August 2008)

== Goalscorers ==
Sources: soccerway.com, sport.be (in Dutch)

17 goals (1 player)

- (Colombia) Alfonso Ruiz (Westerlo)

16 goals (2 players)

- (Belgium) Tom De Sutter (Cercle Brugge (7) and Anderlecht (9))
- (Democratic Republic of the Congo) Dieumerci Mbokani (Standard Liège)

15 goals (1 player)

- (Nigeria) Joseph Akpala (Club Brugge)

14 goals (3 players)

- (Bosnia and Herzegovina) Adnan Ćustović (Mouscron (10) and Gent (4))
- (Niger) Ouwo Moussa Maazou (Lokeren)
- (Belgium) Wesley Sonck (Club Brugge)

13 goals (2 players)

- (Senegal) Mbaye Leye (Zulte Waregem (9) and Gent (4))
- (France) Jérémy Perbet (Tubize)

12 goals (5 players)

- (Morocco) Mbark Boussoufa (Anderlecht)
- (Ukraine) (Belgium) Oleg Iachtchouk (Cercle Brugge)
- (Serbia) Milan Jovanović (Standard Liège)
- (Costa Rica) Bryan Ruiz (Gent)
- (Belgium) Björn Vleminckx (Mechelen)

11 goals (2 players)

- (Senegal) Elimane Coulibaly (Kortrijk)
- (Belgium) David Destorme (Dender)

10 goals (1 player)

- (Belgium) Giuseppe Rossini (Mechelen)

9 goals (4 players)

- (Algeria) Mohamed Dahmane (Mons (7) and Club Brugge (2))
- (France) Habib Habibou (Charleroi)
- (Togo) Adékambi Olufadé (Gent)
- (Belgium) Kevin Roelandts (Zulte Waregem)

8 goals (8 players)

- (Belgium) Igor de Camargo (Standard Liège)
- (Belgium) Guillaume Gillet (Anderlecht)
- (Belgium) Faris Haroun (Germinal Beerschot)
- (The Gambia) Mustapha Jarju (Mons)
- (Croatia) Ivan Leko (Club Brugge (4) and Germinal Beerschot (4))
- (Slovenia) Zlatan Ljubijankić (Gent)
- (Poland) Marcin Wasilewski (Anderlecht)
- (Belgium) Axel Witsel (Standard Liège)

7 goals (7 players)

- (Brazil) João Carlos (Genk)
- (Belgium) Stijn De Smet (Cercle Brugge)
- (Belgium) Sven Kums (Kortrijk)
- (France) Chris Makiese (Charleroi (1) and Zulte Waregem (6))
- (Serbia) Miloš Marić (Gent)
- (Cameroon) Ernest Nfor (Gent (1) and Zulte Waregem (6))
- (France) Norman Sylla (Dender)

6 goals (9 players)

- (Belgium) Grégory Dufer (Tubize)
- (Argentina) Nicolás Frutos (Anderlecht)
- (Israel) Omer Golan (Lokeren)
- (Netherlands) Sherjill MacDonald (Roeselare)
- (Syria) Sanharib Malki (Germinal Beerschot)
- (Belgium) Thomas Matton (Zulte Waregem)
- (France) Idir Ouali (Mouscron)
- (Belgium) Tim Smolders (Charleroi (4) and Gent (2))
- (Belgium) Kevin Vandenbergh (Germinal Beerschot)

5 goals (14 players)

- (Bosnia and Herzegovina) Admir Aganović (Dender)
- (Brazil) Willian (Kortrijk)
- (Israel) Elyaniv Barda (Genk)
- (Belgium) Frederik Boi (Cercle Brugge)
- (Zimbabwe) Honour Gombami (Cercle Brugge)
- (Poland) Dawid Janczyk (Lokeren)
- (Belgium) Jonathan Legear (Anderlecht)
- (Belgium) Christophe Lepoint (Mouscron)
- (Croatia) Ivan Perišić (Roeselare)
- (Belgium) Jeroen Simaeys (Club Brugge)
- (Bosnia and Herzegovina) Sulejman Smajić (Dender)
- (Belgium) Bernd Thijs (Gent)
- (Cameroon) Bertin Tomou (Westerlo)
- (Hungary) Balázs Tóth (Genk)

4 goals (22 players)

- (France) Franck Berrier (Zulte Waregem)
- (Belgium) Thomas Chatelle (Anderlecht)
- (Peru) Daniel Chávez (Club Brugge)
- (France) Wilfried Dalmat (Standard Liège)
- (Belgium) Steven Defour (Standard Liège)
- (Belgium) Tom De Mul (Genk)
- (Mali) Mahamadou Dissa (Roeselare)
- (Nigeria) Tosin Dosunmu (Germinal Beerschot)
- (France) Julien Gorius (Mechelen)
- (Morocco) Mouhcine Iajour (Charleroi)
- (Bahrain) Jaycee Okwunwanne (Mouscron)
- (Hungary) Roland Juhász (Anderlecht)
- (Belgium) Geoffrey Mujangi Bia (Charleroi)
- (Belgium) Joachim Mununga (Mechelen)
- (Slovakia) Adam Nemec (Genk)
- (Czech Republic) Daniel Pudil (Genk)
- (France) Cyril Théréau (Charleroi)
- (Belgium) Gonzague Van Dooren (Mouscron)
- (Belgium) Vittorio Villano (Tubize)
- (Czech Republic) Stanislav Vlček (Anderlecht)
- (Belgium) Jelle Vossen (Genk)
- (Belgium) Stef Wils (Westerlo (3) and Gent (1))

3 goals (37 players)

- (Paraguay) Antolín Alcaraz (Club Brugge)
- (South Africa) Anele Ngcongca (Genk)
- (Costa Rica) Randall Azofeifa (Gent)
- (Netherlands) Istvan Bakx (Kortrijk)
- (Belgium) Walter Baseggio (Mouscron)
- (Belgium) Christian Benteke (Standard Liège)
- (France) Cédric Bétrémieux (Roeselare (2) and Kortrijk (1))
- (Algeria) Fadel Brahami (Mons)
- (Belgium) Thomas Buffel (Cercle Brugge)
- (Russia) Dmitri Bulykin (Anderlecht)
- (Guinea) Aboubacar Camara (Lokeren)
- (Belgium) Philippe Clement (Club Brugge)
- (Belgium) Daan De Pever (Dender)
- (Morocco) Nabil Dirar (Club Brugge)
- (Belgium) Christophe Grégoire (Charleroi)
- (Senegal) Moussa Gueye (Mons)
- (Belgium) Jimmy Hempte (Kortrijk)
- (Belgium) Stijn Huysegems (Genk)
- (Belgium) Jonas Ivens (Mechelen)
- (Senegal) Cheikhou Kouyaté (Kortrijk)
- (Belgium) Tim Matthys (Zulte Waregem)
- (Belgium) Ilombe Mboyo (Charleroi)
- (Belgium) Andréa Mbuyi-Mutombo (Zulte Waregem)
- (Belgium) Koen Persoons (Mechelen)
- (Nigeria) Obiora Odita (Westerlo)
- (Belgium) Marvin Ogunjimi (Genk)
- (United States) Oguchi Onyewu (Standard Liège)
- (Morocco) Abdelmajid Oulmers (Charleroi)
- (Belgium) Mustapha Oussalah (Mouscron)
- (Belgium) Tony Sergeant (Cercle Brugge)
- (Russia) Valeri Sorokin (Gent (0) and Tubize (3))
- (Slovenia) Marko Šuler (Gent)
- (Israel) Salim Tuama (Standard Liège)
- (Belgium) Jelle Van Damme (Anderlecht)
- (Venezuela) Ronald Vargas (Club Brugge)
- (Belgium) Wouter Vrancken (Mechelen)
- (Belgium) Dieter Wittesaele (Dender)

2 goals (33 players)

- (Morocco) Abdessalam Benjelloun (Charleroi (1) and Roeselare (1))
- (Argentina) Lucas Biglia (Anderlecht)
- (Croatia) Mario Carević (Lokeren)
- (France) Cédric Collet (Mons)
- (Belgium) Wouter Corstjens (Westerlo)
- (Belgium) Koen Daerden (Club Brugge)
- (Belgium) Stijn de Wilde (Lokeren)
- (Belgium) Kris De Wree (Germinal Beerschot)
- (Morocco) Mounir Diane (Mons)
- (Belgium) Rachid Farssi (Westerlo)
- (Republic of Ireland) Dominic Foley (Gent (2) and Cercle Brugge (0))
- (Brazil) Fred (Dender)
- (Belgium) Bart Goor (Anderlecht (1) and Germinal Beerschot (1))
- (Finland) Janne Hietanen (Roeselare)
- (Ukraine) Oleksandr Iakovenko (Anderlecht)
- (Democratic Republic of the Congo) Jean-Paul Kielo-Lezi (Mechelen)
- (Belgium) Stijn Meert (Zulte Waregem)
- (Belgium) Pieterjan Monteyne (Germinal Beerschot)
- (Burundi) Dugary Ndabashinze (Genk)
- (Zimbabwe) Vuza Nyoni (Cercle Brugge)
- (Nigeria) Azubuike Oliseh (Roeselare)
- (Belgium) Kevin Oris (Mons)
- (Ivory Coast) Sekou Ouattara (Roeselare)
- (Belgium) Killian Overmeire (Lokeren)
- (Czech Republic) Jan Polák (Anderlecht)
- (Venezuela) Roberto Rosales (Gent)
- (Belgium) Wouter Scheelen (Westerlo)
- (Ukraine) Serhiy Serebrennikov (Cercle Brugge)
- (Hungary) Dániel Tőzsér (Genk)
- (Belgium) Bart Van Den Eede (Dender)
- (Belgium) Ludwin Van Nieuwenhuyze (Zulte Waregem)
- (Czech Republic) Lukáš Zelenka (Westerlo)
- (Israel) Yoav Ziv (Lokeren)

1 goal (77 players)

- (Nigeria) Mozes Adams (Westerlo)
- (France) Karim Belhocine (Kortrijk)
- (Croatia) Leon Benko (Standard Liège)
- (Honduras) Víctor Bernárdez (Anderlecht)
- (Belgium) Sylvain Berton (Mouscron)
- (Belgium) Siebe Blondelle (Dender)
- (Belgium) Ludovic Buyssens (Mons)
- (France) Jean-Philippe Caillet (Genk)
- (France) Fabien Camus (Charleroi)
- (Belgium) Janis Coppin (Zulte Waregem)
- (Belgium) Alessandro Cordaro (Mons)
- (Colombia) Daniel Cruz (Germinal Beerschot)
- (Bosnia and Herzegovina) Jusuf Dajić (Tubize)
- (Brazil) Dante (Standard Liège)
- (Belgium) Wim De Decker (Genk (0) and Germinal Beerschot (1))
- (Belgium) Dieter Dekelver (Westerlo)
- (Belgium) Bram de Ly (Kortrijk)
- (France) Boubacar Dembélé (Roeselare)
- (Belgium) Steven de Petter (Dender)
- (Belgium) Joeri Dequevy (Roeselare)
- (Belgium) Jonas de Roeck (Gent)
- (Belgium) Karel D'Haene (Zulte Waregem)
- (Belgium) Didier Dheedene (Germinal Beerschot)
- (Belgium) Frédéric Dupré (Lokeren)
- (Belgium) Chemcedine El Araichi (Mouscron)
- (Belgium) Karel Geraerts (Club Brugge)
- (Belgium) Kevin Geudens (Mechelen)
- (Belgium) Réginal Goreux (Standard Liège)
- (France) Christophe Grondin (Gent)
- (Belgium) Romain Haghedooren (Mouscron)
- (Belgium) Alan Haydock (Tubize)
- (Belgium) Kristof Imschoot (Mechelen)
- (Belgium) Steven Jacobs (Dender)
- (France) Frédéric Jay (Mons)
- (Germany) Torben Joneleit (Charleroi)
- (Turkey) Yasin Karaca (Tubize)
- (Burkina Faso) Mahamoudou Kéré (Charleroi)
- (Sierra Leone) Paul Kpaka (Germinal Beerschot)
- (Serbia) Mladen Lazarević (Roeselare)
- (Argentina) Hernán Losada (Anderlecht)
- (Democratic Republic of the Congo) Marcel Mbayo (Lokeren)
- (Belgium) Damien Miceli (Charleroi)
- (Bosnia and Herzegovina) Damir Mirvić (Roeselare)
- (Rwanda) Jimmy Mulisa (Roeselare)
- (Rwanda) Henri Munyaneza (Germinal Beerschot)
- (Costa Rica) Roy Myrie (Gent)
- (Ivory Coast) Arsène Né (Germinal Beerschot)
- (Belgium) Grégoire Neels (Tubize)
- (France) Benjamin Nicaise (Standard Liège)
- (Finland) Antti Okkonen (Mons)
- (Ghana) King Gyan Osei (Germinal Beerschot)
- (France) Jean-Baptiste Paternotte (Tubize)
- (Serbia) Nebojša Pavlović (Lokeren)
- (Belgium) Anthony Portier (Cercle Brugge)
- (Belgium) Silvio Proto (Germinal Beerschot)
- (Belgium) Vincent Provoost (Roeselare)
- (France) Vincent Ramaël (Tubize)
- (Ivory Coast) Bassilia Sakanoko (Mouscron)
- (Brazil) Santiago (Tubize)
- (Senegal) Mohamed Sarr (Standard Liège)
- (South Africa) Asanda Sishuba (Mouscron)
- (Belgium) Björn Smits (Roeselare)
- (Belgium) Tom Soetaers (Genk)
- (Israel) Avi Strool (Lokeren)
- (Argentina) Matías Suárez (Anderlecht)
- (Switzerland) Danijel Subotić (Zulte Waregem)
- (Serbia) Đorđe Svetličić (Germinal Beerschot)
- (France) Jérémy Taravel (Zulte Waregem)
- (Netherlands) Arturo ten Heuvel (Roeselare)
- (Belgium) Kenny Thompson (Gent)
- (Nigeria) Ode Thompson (Roeselare)
- (Belgium) Romeo Van Dessel (Mechelen)
- (Belgium) Brecht Verbrugghe (Kortrijk)
- (Belgium) Jonathan Walasiak (Mouscron)
- (Cameroon) Justice Wamfor (Germinal Beerschot)
- (Belgium) Hiraç Yagan (Standard Liège)
- (Bosnia and Herzegovina) Ervin Zukanović (Dender)

Own goals (17 players, 18 goals)

- (Paraguay) Antolín Alcaraz (Club Brugge, scored for Charleroi)
- (Belgium) Yohan Brouckaert (Tubize, scored for Westerlo)
- (Belgium) Frank Defays (Charleroi, scored for Tubize)
- (Belgium) Jonas De Roeck (Gent, scored for Westerlo)
- (Belgium) Karel D'Haene (Zulte Waregem, scored for Westerlo)
- (Belgium) Chemcedine El Araichi (Mouscron, scored for Tubize)
- (Finland) Janne Hietanen (Roeselare, scored for Kortrijk)
- (Serbia) Bojan Jorgacević (Gent, scored for Mechelen)
- (Belgium) Damien Miceli (Charleroi, scored for Cercle Brugge)
- (Croatia) Tomislav Mikulić (Standard Liège, scored for Mechelen)
- (Belgium) Grégoire Neels (Tubize, scored for Westerlo)
- (United States) Oguchi Onyewu (Standard Liège, scored for Dender)
- (Belgium) Rocky Peeters (Germinal Beerschot, scored for Charleroi and Zulte Waregem)
- (Belgium) Anthony Portier (Cercle Brugge, scored for Charleroi)
- (France) Jérémy Taravel (Zulte Waregem, scored for Germinal Beerschot)
- (Belgium) Kenny Van Hoevelen (Mechelen, scored for Mouscron)
- (Belgium) Stef Wils (Westerlo, scored for Dender)

== Attendances ==
No.	Club	Average attendance	Change	Highest
1	Club Brugge	26,085	-1,1%	28,180
2	Standard de Liège	25,912	0,5%	28,000
3	Anderlecht	23,654	-5,0%	24,377
4	Genk	22,004	-5,4%	24,000
5	Mechelen	11,079	-0,6%	12,800
6	Gent	10,639	-0,5%	13,000
7	Cercle Brugge	10,502	4,0%	23,163
8	Germinal Beerschot	10,002	1,4%	12,000
9	Charleroi	9,267	-1,3%	20,701
10	Zulte Waregem	6,682	-0,3%	8,900
11	Kortrijk	6,307	166,8%	9,000
12	Sporting Lokeren	6,120	5,4%	8,638
13	Westerlo	5,979	0,6%	10,638
14	Mouscron	5,631	-3,6%	10,497
15	Roeselare	5,528	-9,3%	7,000
16	Dender	5,072	8,6%	8,005
17	RAEC	4,294	-7,6%	9,000
18	Tubize	3,953	299,7%	8,000

== See also ==
- 2008–09 R.S.C. Anderlecht season
- List of Belgian football transfers summer 2008
- List of Belgian football transfers winter 2008–09
