= 2008–09 KV Mechelen season =

K.V. Mechelen
2008–09 season
- Chairman: Johan Timmermans
- Manager: Peter Maes
- Stadium: Veoliastadion
- Belgian First Division: 10th
- Belgian Cup: Runners-up
- Top goalscorer: League: Björn Vleminckx (12); All: Björn Vleminckx (12)
- Average home league attendance: 11,079

The 2008–09 season was the 118th season in the history of K.V. Mechelen and the club's third consecutive season in the top flight of Belgian football. In addition to the domestic league, K.V. Mechelen participated in this season's edition of the Belgian Cup.

== Competitions ==
=== Overall record ===
Competition	First match	Last match	Starting round	Final position	Record							
Competition	First match	Last match	Starting round	Final position	Pld	W	D	L	GF	GA	GD	Win %
Belgian First Division	23 August 2008	15 May 2009	Matchday 1	10th	34	12	10	12	46	52	−6	35.29
Belgian Cup	11 November 2008	23 May 2009	Sixth round	Runners-up	7	4	1	2	10	8	+2	57.14
Total					41	16	11	14	56	60	−4	39.02

Last updated: 25 July 2021
Source: Soccerway

=== Belgian First Division ===
==== League table ====
Pos	Team	Pld	W	D	L	GF	GA	GD	Pts	Qualification or relegation
8	Genk	34	15	5	14	48	51	−3	50	Qualification to Europa League play-off round (Note: Genk qualified for the play-off round of the UEFA Europa League by winning the 2008–09 Belgian Cup.)
9	Cercle Brugge	34	14	5	15	48	53	−5	47	
10	Mechelen	34	12	10	12	46	52	−6	46	
11	Mouscron	34	12	8	14	42	49	−7	44	
12	Charleroi	34	12	7	15	43	48	−5	43	

Source: soccerway.com
Rules for classification: 1) points; 2) number of matches won; if teams are still tied a playoff is organised.

==== Results summary ====
Overall								Home						Away					
Pld	W	D	L	GF	GA	GD	Pts	W	D	L	GF	GA	GD	W	D	L	GF	GA	GD
34	12	10	12	46	52	−6	46	6	7	4	24	20	+4	6	3	8	22	32	−10

==== Results by round ====
Round	1	2	3	4	5	6	7	8	9	10	11	12	13	14	15	16	17	18	19	20	21	22	23	24	25	26	27	28	29	30	31	32	33	34
Ground	H	A	H	H	A	H	A	H	A	H	A	H	A	H	A	H	A	A	H	A	A	H	A	H	A	H	A	H	A	H	A	H	A	H
Result	D	L	L	D	W	W	L	L	L	L	D	D	L	D	W	W	D	L	D	D	W	D	W	W	W	W	L	D	W	L	L	W	L	W
Position	12	16	17	17	14	9	11	13	15	15	15	16	16	16	15	13	13	14	14	14	13	13	13	12	11	10	11	10	10	11	11	10	11	10

A = Away; H = Home; W = Win; D = Draw; L = Loss

==== Matches ====
30 August 2008 3	Mechelen	0–2	Zulte Waregem	Mechelen
20:00 CEST (UTC+2)				Stadium: AFAS Stadion

13 September 2008 4	Mechelen	0–0	Tubize	Mechelen
20:00 CEST (UTC+2)				Stadium: AFAS Stadion

24 September 2008 1	Mechelen	1–1	Club Brugge	Mechelen
20:30 CEST (UTC+2)				Stadium: AFAS Stadion

29 September 2008 6	Mechelen	4–1	Dender	Mechelen
20:30 CEST (UTC+2)				Stadium: AFAS Stadion

18 October 2008 8	Mechelen	1–3	Westerlo	Mechelen
20:30 CEST (UTC+2)				Stadium: AFAS Stadion

1 November 2008 10	Mechelen	1–2	Roeselare	Mechelen
20:30 CET (UTC+1)				Stadium: AFAS Stadion

15 November 2008 12	Mechelen	0–0	Mons	Mechelen
20:00 CET (UTC+1)				Stadium: AFAS Stadion

30 November 2008 14	Mechelen	0–0	Standard Liège	Mechelen
18:00 CET (UTC+1)				Stadium: AFAS Stadion

12 December 2008 16	Mechelen	2–1	Germinal Beerschot	Mechelen
20:30 CET (UTC+1)				Stadium: AFAS Stadion

24 January 2009 19	Mechelen	2–2	Excelsior Mouscron	Mechelen
20:00 CET (UTC+1)				Stadium: AFAS Stadion

14 February 2009 22	Mechelen	3–3	Gent	Mechelen
20:00 CET (UTC+1)				Stadium: AFAS Stadion

27 February 2009 24	Mechelen	2–1	Genk	Mechelen
20:30 CET (UTC+1)				Stadium: AFAS Stadion

13 March 2009 26	Mechelen	2–1	Anderlecht	Mechelen
20:30 CET (UTC+1)				Stadium: AFAS Stadion

4 April 2009 28	Mechelen	1–1	Kortrijk	Mechelen
20:00 CEST (UTC+2)				Stadium: AFAS Stadion

11 April 2009 29	Mons	0–1	Mechelen	Mons
20:00 CEST (UTC+2)				Stadium: Stade Charles Tondreau

18 April 2009 30	Mechelen	0–1	Cercle Brugge	Mechelen
20:00 CEST (UTC+2)				Stadium: AFAS Stadion

25 April 2009 31	Standard Liège	4–1	Mechelen	Liège
20:00 CEST (UTC+2)				Stadium: Stade Maurice Dufrasne

2 May 2009 32	Mechelen	2–1	Charleroi	Mechelen
20:00 CEST (UTC+2)				Stadium: AFAS Stadion

8 May 2009 33	Germinal Beerschot	3–1	Mechelen	Antwerp
20:30 CEST (UTC+2)				Stadium: Olympisch Stadion

15 May 2009 34	Mechelen	3–0	Lokeren	Mechelen
20:30 CEST (UTC+2)				Stadium: AFAS Stadion

=== Belgian Cup ===
27 January 2009 Quarter-finals; First leg	Mechelen	1–0	Kortrijk	Mechelen
20:30 CEST (UTC+2)	Persoons 74'			Stadium: Veolia Stadium Achter de Kazerne

17 February 2009 Quarter-finals; Second leg	Kortrijk	0–0 (0–1 agg.)	Mechelen	Kortrijk
20:30 CET (UTC+1)				Stadium: Guldensporen Stadion

4 March 2009 Semi-finals; First leg	Cercle Brugge	2–1	Mechelen	Bruges
20:45 CET (UTC+1)	Gombani 61'; De Smet 75'		Vleminckx 82'	Stadium: Jan Breydel Stadion

21 April 2009 Semi-finals; Second leg	Mechelen	2–1 (3–3 agg.) (5–3 p)	Cercle Brugge	Mechelen
20:45 CEST (UTC+2)	Vleminckx 28'; Mununga 68'		Sergeant 45'	Stadium: Veolia Stadium Achter de Kazerne

23 May 2009 Final	Mechelen	0–2	Genk	Brussels
20:30 CEST (UTC+2)			Ogunjimi 42', 62'	Stadium: King Baudouin Stadium
