= 2021–22 Belgian First Division B =

Belgian First Division B
- Season: 2021–22
- Champions: Westerlo
- Promoted: Westerlo
- Relegated: Excel Mouscron
- Matches: 112
- Goals: 322 (2.88 per match)
- Top goalscorer: Daniel Maderner (13 goals)
- Biggest home win: Lierse Kempenzonen 4–1 RWDM (12 September 2021); Lommel 3–0 Excel Mouscron (17 October 2021); Deinze 3–0 Virton (3 December 2021); Waasland-Beveren 4–1 Deinze (12 December 2021); Excel Mouscron 3–0 Waasland-Beveren (5 February 2022); Westerlo 3–0 Lommel (6 February 2022); Lommel 3–0 Virton (13 February 2022); RWDM 3–0 Virton (20 March 2022); Deinze 3–0 RWDM (3 April 2022)
- Biggest away win: Excel Mouscron 0–4 Waasland-Beveren (28 August 2021); Lierse Kempenzonen 1–5 Westerlo (20 November 2021); Virton 0–4 Waasland-Beveren (23 January 2022); Excel Mouscron 2–6 Westerlo (8 April 2022)
- Highest scoring: Excel Mouscron 2–6 Westerlo (8 April 2022)
- Longest winning run: 4 matches Excel Mouscron and Westerlo
- Longest unbeaten run: 9 matches Lommel and Westerlo

The 2021–22 season of the Belgian First Division B was the 7th season of the Belgian First Division B since its establishment in 2016. The season started in August 2021 and ended in April 2022. Westerlo won the title by a considerable margin over RWDM, the latter going onto lose the promotion play-off, failing to get promoted as a result. Virton ended in last place and would have been relegated, were it not for the fact that after the season Excel Mouscron was not awarded a licence, causing them to be relegated instead.

== Team changes ==
=== In ===
- Royal Excel Mouscron were directly relegated from the 2020–21 Belgian First Division A after finishing last.
- Waasland-Beveren were also relegated from the 2020–21 Belgian First Division A, after losing the promotion/relegation play-offs against Seraing.
- Virton, who were denied both a professional and remunerated license at the end of the 2019–20 season and forced to relegate two levels as a result, successfully appealed this decision and were forced to be reinstated at this level.

=== Out ===
- Union SG were promoted from the 2020–21 Belgian First Division B as champions.
- Seraing were promoted to the 2021–22 Belgian First Division A after winning the promotion/relegation play-offs against Waasland-Beveren.
- Club NXT was removed as it was decided no longer to include U23 teams for the 2021–22 season.

== Format changes ==
Initially, the plan was to change the format of the Belgian First Division B only for the 2020–21 season, with the league no longer consisting of two separate competitions but instead, one single league in which all teams play each other four times, without playoffs. This was however extended with at least one season, meaning the 2021–22 Belgian First Division B continues with the same format as the previous season.

== Team information ==
=== Stadiums and locations ===
Locations of the 2021–22 Belgian First Division B teams

Matricule	Club	City	First season of current spell at second level	Coming from	2020-21 result	Stadium	Capacity
818	K.M.S.K. Deinze	Deinze	2020–21	Belgian First Amateur Division	5th (D1B)	Burgemeester Van de Wiele Stadion	7,515
216	Royal Excel Mouscron	Mouscron	2021–22	Belgian First Division A	18th (D1A)	Stade Le Canonnier	10,800
3970	Lierse Kempenzonen	Lier	2020–21	Belgian First Amateur Division	7th (D1B)	Herman Vanderpoortenstadion	14,538
2554	Lommel SK	Lommel	2018–19	Belgian First Amateur Division	3rd (D1B)	Soevereinstadion	8,000
5479	RWD Molenbeek	Molenbeek	2020–21	Belgian First Amateur Division	6th (D1B)	Edmond Machtens Stadium	12,266
200	R.E. Virton	Virton	2021–22	Belgian Division 2	Unranked (D2)	Stade Yvan Georges	4,015
4068	Waasland-Beveren	Beveren	2021–22	Belgian First Division A	17th (D1A)	Freethiel Stadion	8,190
2024	K.V.C. Westerlo	Westerlo	2017–18	Belgian First Division A	4th (D1B)	Het Kuipje	8,035

=== Personnel and kits ===
Club	Manager	Kit Manufacturer	Sponsors
Deinze	(Belgium) Wim De Decker	Legea	Dakota Vastgoed & Declercq Stortbeton
Excel Mouscron	(Belgium) José Jeunechamps (Note: Enzo Scifo was the manager for matchdays 1 through 7, Philippe Saint-Jean was the caretaker manager on matchday 8.)	Uhlsport	Star Casino
Lierse Kempenzonen	(Belgium) Tom Van Imschoot	Jako	Keukens Van Lommel
Lommel	(England) Brian Eastick (Note: Peter van der Veen was the manager for matchdays 1 through 14, Luíz Felipe was caretaker manager for matchdays 15 through 19, and Patrick Greveraars was caretaker on matchday 20.)	Masita	United Telecom
RWD Molenbeek	(Belgium) Vincent Euvrard	Joma	Symbio
Virton	(Uruguay) Pablo Correa (Note: Christophe Grégoire was the manager for matchdays 1 through 15, while Emmanuel Coquelet was the caretaker manager on matchday 16.)		
Waasland-Beveren	(Spain) Jordi Condom (Note: Marc Schneider was the manager for matchdays 1 through 22.)	Uhlsport	Star Casino
Westerlo	(Belgium) Jonas De Roeck	Saller	Soudal

=== Managerial changes ===
Team	Outgoing manager	Manner of departure	Date of vacancy	Position	Replaced by	Date of appointment
Deinze	(Belgium) Cédric Vlaeminck (caretaker)	Caretaker replaced	End of 2020–21 season	Pre-season	(Belgium) Wim De Decker	4 March 2020 (Note: Wim De Decker was appointed the new manager of Deinze already on 4 March 2020, but would only be observing and analyzing the players for the remainder of the season. Assistant-manager Cédric Vlaeminck will take up the role of manager until the end of the season, leading the training sessions and being on the sideline during matches.)
Westerlo	(Belgium) Bob Peeters	Sacked	End of 2020–21 season	Pre-season	(Belgium) Jonas De Roeck	27 May 2021
Excel Mouscron	(Portugal) Jorge Simão	Hired by (Portugal) Paços Ferreira	End of 2020–21 season	Pre-season	(Belgium) Enzo Scifo	22 June 2021
Waasland-Beveren	(Belgium) Nicky Hayen	Sacked	End of 2020–21 season	Pre-season	(Switzerland) Marc Schneider	18 May 2021
Virton	No manager since end of 2019–20 season			Pre-season	(Belgium) Christophe Grégoire	27 July 2021
Lommel	(England) Liam Manning	Hired by (England) Milton Keynes Dons	11 August 2021	Pre-season	(Netherlands) Peter van der Veen	11 August 2021 (Note: Peter van der Veen was initially appointed caretaker manager at Lommel following the departure of Liam Manning, but took over permanently just one week later.)
Excel Mouscron	(Belgium) Enzo Scifo	Sacked	14 October 2021	8th	(Belgium) Philippe Saint-Jean (caretaker)	14 October 2021
Excel Mouscron	(Belgium) Philippe Saint-Jean	Caretaker replaced	19 October 2021	8th	(Belgium) José Jeunechamps	19 October 2021
Virton	(Belgium) Christophe Grégoire	Sacked	13 December 2021	8th	(France) Emmanuel Coquelet (caretaker)	13 December 2021
Lommel	(Netherlands) Peter van der Veen	Resigned	14 December 2021	7th	(Brazil) Luíz Felipe	14 December 2021 (Note: Luíz Felipe was initially appointed caretaker manager at Lommel following the departure of Peter van der Veen, but was appointed permanent manager one month later.)
Virton	(France) Emmanuel Coquelet	Caretaker replaced	22 December 2021	8th	(Uruguay) Pablo Correa	22 December 2021
Lommel	(Brazil) Luíz Felipe	Mutual Consent	7 February 2022	7th	(Netherlands) Patrick Greveraars (caretaker)	7 February 2022
Lommel	(Netherlands) Patrick Greveraars	Caretaker replaced	16 February 2022	7th	(England) Brian Eastick	16 February 2022
Waasland-Beveren	(Switzerland) Marc Schneider	Sacked	28 February 2022	3rd	(Spain) Jordi Condom	28 February 2022

== League table ==
Pos	Team	Pld	W	D	L	GF	GA	GD	Pts	Qualification	WES	RWD	WAA	DEI	LIE	LOM	EXC	VIR	WES	RWD	WAA	DEI	LIE	LOM	EXC	VIR
1	Westerlo (C, P)	28	17	5	6	52	29	+23	56	Promotion to the 2022–23 Belgian First Division A	—	0–0	1–1	2–2	3–2	2–0	4–3	2–0	—	2–2	2–1	0–3	2–0	3–0	1–0	1–1
2	RWDM47	28	14	7	7	41	33	+8	49	Qualification to Promotion play-off	1–2	—	1–3	2–2	3–3	1–2	3–1	0–0	0–2 (Note: The match between RWDM and Westerlo of 10 December 2021 was postponed due to excessive snow and instead played on 25 January 2022.)	—	2–1	1–0	3–1	2–0	2–0	3–0
3	Waasland-Beveren	28	12	5	11	47	40	+7	41		0–2	2–3	—	0–2	1–3	2–1	0–2	4–3	2–1	1–0	—	4–1	0–1	1–1	2–0	3–1
4	Deinze	28	9	12	7	47	39	+8	39		2–1	1–2	0–0	—	1–1	3–3	3–1	3–0	1–2	3–0	3–3	—	1–2	1–1	2–2	2–1
5	Lierse Kempenzonen	28	9	9	10	39	42	−3	36		1–5	4–1	2–1	2–2	—	2–2	2–2	2–0	1–0	0–1	2–0	1–1	—	0–2	0–1	1–1
6	Lommel	28	9	8	11	39	40	−1	35		0–1	2–3	2–3	2–2	3–1	—	3–0	1–3	2–1	1–1	1–1	2–1	0–1	—	0–0	3–0
7	Excel Mouscron (Note: On 13 April 2022, the Belgian FA announced that Excel Mouscron had not been awarded a Belgian professional football license for the coming season, meaning that the club will not be allowed to play in the top two divisions of Belgian football and thus be relegated to the 2022–23 Belgian National Division 1 instead of Virton. One day later, the committee awarding the licenses announced that the club had also not obtained a Belgian remunerated football license, which meant it will be relegated to the 2022–23 Belgian Division 2, where it will start with a three points handicap. The club has announced that it will appeal the decision, as it has done so successfully already no less than six times during the previous seven years. On 10 May 2022, their appeal was rejected and the club's relegation was confirmed. On 31 May 2022, the club announced it would be filing for bankruptcy, as no party was found willing to take over the club. It is in discussion with the ACFF to possibly continue with a team in the provincial leagues (5th level).) (R)	28	8	6	14	31	45	−14	30	Folded as a team	1–2	1–1	0–4	2–0	2–1	0–1	—	1–1	2–6	0–1	3–0	1–2	0–0	2–1	—	2–1
8	Virton	28	5	6	17	24	52	−28	21		0–2	0–2	0–3	1–1	2–1	2–1	0–2	—	1–0	0–1	0–4	0–2	2–2	2–3	2–0	—

Updated to match(es) played on completed. Source: Belgian First Division B
Rules for classification: 1) Points; 2) Matches won; 3) Goal difference; 4) Goals scored; 5) Away goals scored; 6) Away matches won; 7) Play-off.
(C) Champions; (P) Promoted; (R) Relegated

=== Positions by round ===
The table lists the positions of teams after the completion of each round. In the overview below, not all teams had played the same number of matches:

- The match between RWDM and Westerlo on matchday 15 was postponed and instead played between matchdays 17 and 18.
- The match between Westerlo and Deinze on matchday 17 was postponed and instead played between matchdays 19 and 20.
- The match between Lierse and Westerlo on matchday 21 was postponed and instead played between matchdays 24 and 25.

Team ╲ Round	1	2	3	4	5	6	7	8	9	10	11	12	13	14	15	16	17	18	19	20	21	22	23	24	25	26	27	28
Westerlo	2	4	1	1	1	1	1	1	1	1	1	1	1	1	1	1	1	1	1	1	1	1	1	1	1	1	1	1
RWDM47	1	3	4	5	6	7	6	7	6	6	6	4	3	3	3	3	3	3	2	2	2	2	2	2	2	2	2	2
Waasland-Beveren	3	6	2	4	3	5	2	2	2	2	2	2	2	2	2	2	2	2	3	3	3	3	3	3	3	4	4	3
Deinze	5	1	3	2	2	4	5	5	5	4	4	5	4	4	4	4	4	4	4	4	4	4	4	4	4	3	3	4
Lierse Kempenzonen	4	2	5	3	4	2	3	4	4	3	3	3	5	5	6	6	6	5	6	5	6	6	6	6	6	5	5	5
Lommel	6	5	6	6	5	3	4	3	3	5	5	6	7	6	7	7	7	7	7	7	7	7	7	7	7	7	6	6
Excel Mouscron	7	7	8	8	8	8	8	8	8	8	8	7	6	7	5	5	5	6	5	6	5	5	5	5	5	6	7	7
Virton	8	8	7	7	7	6	7	6	7	7	7	8	8	8	8	8	8	8	8	8	8	8	8	8	8	8	8	8

Updated to match(es) played on completed. Source: worldfootball.net

== Season statistics ==
=== Top scorers ===
As of 17 April 2022

Rank	Player	Club	Goals
1	(Austria) Daniel Maderner	Waasland-Beveren	13
2	(Belgium) Lennart Mertens	Deinze	12
3	(North Macedonia) Erdon Daci	Westerlo	10
4	(Mauritania) Souleymane Anne	Virton	9
4	(Belgium) Dylan De Belder	Deinze	9
4	(France) Kévin Hoggas	Waasland-Beveren	9
7	(Slovakia) Ján Bernát	Westerlo	8
7	(Guinea) Bafodé Dansoko	Deinze	8
7	(Brazil) Arthur Sales	Lommel	8
10	(Madagascar) Hakim Abdallah	Lierse Kempenzonen	7
10	(France) Kévin Nzuzi Mata	RWDM	7
10	(Brazil) Lucas Ribeiro Costa	Waasland-Beveren (includes 5 goals for Excel Mouscron)	7

6 goals (4 players)
- (Belgium) Kenneth Schuermans (Lierse Kempenzonen)
- (Armenia) Ivan Yagan (Lierse Kempenzonen)
- (Japan) Koki Saito (Lommel)
- (Belgium) Maxim De Cuyper (Westerlo)
5 goals (6 players)
- (Belgium) Youssef Challouk (Deinze)
- (Belgium) Joachim Carcela (Excel Mouscron)
- (France) Teddy Chevalier (Excel Mouscron)
- (Belgium) Thibaut Van Acker (Lierse Kempenzonen)
- (Brazil) Cauê (Lommel)
- (Ivory Coast) William Togui (RWDM)
4 goals (10 players)
- (Belgium) Gaëtan Hendrickx (Deinze)
- (Belgium) Stallone Limbombe (Lierse Kempenzonen)
- (France) Florian Le Joncour (RWDM)
- (Guadeloupe) Lenny Nangis (RWDM)
- (Belgium) Nicolas Rommens (RWDM)
- (Belgium) Gilles Ruyssen (RWDM)
- (Morocco) Ayyoub Allach (Virton)
- (South Africa) Lyle Foster (Westerlo)
- (Belgium) Kyan Vaesen (Westerlo)
- (Belgium) Lukas Van Eenoo (Westerlo)
3 goals (7 players)
- (Belgium) Christophe Lepoint (Excel Mouscron)
- (Belgium) Robin Henkens (Lommel)
- (Belgium) Arno Verschueren (Lommel)
- (Democratic Republic of the Congo) Hervé Kage (Virton)
- (Switzerland) Leonardo Bertone (Waasland-Beveren)
- (Belgium) Louis Verstraete (Waasland-Beveren)
- (Belgium) Tuur Dierckx (Westerlo)
2 goals (21 players)
- (France) Frédéric Duplus (Excel Mouscron)
- (France) Clément Tainmont (Excel Mouscron)
- (Belgium) Jonathan Hendrickx (Lierse Kempenzonen)
- (Belgium) Alexander Maes (Lierse Kempenzonen)
- (Belgium) Jens Naessens (Lierse Kempenzonen)
- (Belgium) Nils Schouterden (Lierse Kempenzonen)
- (Belgium) Kevin Kis (Lommel)
- (Brazil) Diego Rosa (Lommel)
- (Iceland) Kolbeinn Þórðarson (Lommel)
- (Mali) Abdoul Karim Danté (RWDM)
- (Belgium) Igor de Camargo (RWDM)
- (Belgium) Kylian Hazard (RWDM)
- (Kazakhstan) Yan Vorogovsky (RWDM)
- (France) Marc-Olivier Doué (Virton)
- (Albania) Din Sula (Virton)
- (Faroe Islands) Jóan Símun Edmundsson (Waasland-Beveren)
- (United States) Joseph Efford (Waasland-Beveren)
- (Belgium) Brendan Schoonbaert (Waasland-Beveren)
- (Switzerland) Léo Seydoux (Westerlo)
- (Belgium) Thomas Van den Keybus (Westerlo)
1 goal (42 players)
- (South Africa) Kurt Abrahams (Deinze)
- (Belgium) Siebe Blondelle (Deinze)
- (Belgium) Viktor Boone (Deinze)
- (Belgium) Christophe Janssens (Deinze)
- (Ukraine) Denis Prychynenko (Deinze)
- (Belgium) Robbe Quirynen (Deinze)
- (Belgium) Alessio Staelens (Deinze)
- (Montenegro) Marko Bakić (Excel Mouscron)
- (France) Eric Bocat (Excel Mouscron)
- (Senegal) Christophe Diandy (Excel Mouscron)
- (France) Dimitri Mohamed (Excel Mouscron)
- (Belgium) Guillaume De Schryver (Lierse Kempenzonen)
- (Belgium) Brent Laes (Lierse Kempenzonen)
- (Burundi) Jordi Liongola (Lierse Kempenzonen)
- (Belgium) Agustin Anello (Lommel)
- (Australia) Daniel Arzani (Lommel)
- (Belgium) Rafik Belghali (Lommel)
- (Algeria) Ishak Boussouf (Lommel)
- (Belgium) Glenn Neven (Lommel)
- (France) Théo Pierrot (Lommel)
- (Netherlands) Bryan Smeets (Lommel)
- (Belgium) Glenn Claes (RWDM)
- (Belgium) Zakaria El Ouahdi (RWDM)
- (Martinique) Thomas Ephestion (RWDM)
- (Belgium) Jarno Libert (RWDM)
- (Belgium) Jamal Aabbou (Virton)
- (Belgium) Valentin Guillaume (Virton)
- (Kosovo) Altin Kryeziu (Virton)
- (France) Aboubakar Sidibé (Virton)
- (Belgium) Michael Davis (Waasland-Beveren)
- (France) Jordan Faucher (Waasland-Beveren)
- (Switzerland) Chris Kablan (Waasland-Beveren)
- (Belgium) Jenthe Mertens (Waasland-Beveren)
- (United States) Jacob Montes (Waasland-Beveren)
- (Belgium) Tom Reyners (Waasland-Beveren)
- (Ivory Coast) Fernand Gouré (Westerlo)
- (Bulgaria) Edisson Jordanov (Westerlo)
- (Belgium) Simon Paulet (Westerlo)
- (Belgium) Pietro Perdichizzi (Westerlo)
- (Belgium) Tibo Persyn (Westerlo)
- (Senegal) Noël Soumah (Westerlo)
- (Angola) Igor Vetokele (Westerlo)
2 own goals (1 player)
- (Belgium) Pietro Perdichizzi (Westerlo, scored for Excel Mouscron and Waasland-Beveren)
1 own goal (9 players)
- (Belgium) William Simba (Excel Mouscron, scored for Waasland-Beveren)
- (Madagascar) Hakim Abdallah (Lierse Kempenzonen, scored for Excel Mouscron)
- (Belgium) Joeri Poelmans (Lierse Kempenzonen, scored for Excel Mouscron)
- (Belgium) Kenneth Schuermans (Lierse Kempenzonen, scored for RWDM)
- (Mali) Abdoul Karim Danté (RWDM, scored for Waasland-Beveren)
- (Belgium) Jenthe Mertens (Waasland-Beveren, scored for Excel Mouscron)
- (Belgium) Brendan Schoonbaert (Waasland-Beveren, scored for Lommel)
- (Serbia) Aleksandar Vukotić (Waasland-Beveren, scored for Deinze)
- (Denmark) David Jensen (Westerlo, scored for Excel Mouscron)

=== Team of the season ===
Upon completion of the regular season a team of the season award was compiled, based upon the results of the team of the week results throughout the season, constructed based on nominations from managers, assistant-managers, journalists and analysts. The results were announced from 25 April 2022, with one player revealed each day.

Pos		Player	Club	Ref
GK	(Belgium)	Théo Defourny	RWDM	
RB	(Algeria)	Rafik Belghali	Lommel	
CB	(Belgium)	Rubin Seigers	Westerlo	
CB	(Belgium)	Kenneth Schuermans	Lierse Kempenzonen	
LB	(Belgium)	Maxim De Cuyper	Westerlo	
RW	(Belgium)	Youssef Challouk	Deinze	
MF	(Belgium)	Lukas Van Eenoo	Westerlo	
MF	(Belgium)	Nicolas Rommens	RWDM	
LW	(Guadeloupe)	Lenny Nangis	RWDM	
FW	(South Africa)	Lyle Foster	Westerlo	
FW	(Austria)	Daniel Maderner	Waasland-Beveren	

== Number of teams by provinces ==
Number of teams	Province or region	Team(s)
2	Antwerp	Lierse Kempenzonen and Westerlo
2	East Flanders	Deinze and Waasland-Beveren
1	Brussels	RWD Molenbeek
1	Hainaut	Excel Mouscron
1	Limburg	Lommel
1	Luxembourg	Virton
