= 2008–09 in Belgian football =

Football in Belgium
- Season: 2008–09

The 2008–09 football season in Belgium, which is the 106th season of competitive football in the country.

== Honours ==
Competition	Winner
First division	Standard Liège
Second division	Sint-Truiden
Third division A	Wetteren
Third division B	Turnhout
Promotion A	Coxyde
Promotion B	Temse
Promotion C	Heist
Promotion D	Bleid
Cup	Genk
Supercup	Standard Liège

== League competitions ==
=== Belgian First Division ===
Pos	Team	Pld	W	D	L	GF	GA	GD	Pts	Qualification or relegation
1	Standard Liège (C)	34	24	5	5	66	26	+40	77 (Note: The championship was decided in a playoff (see below).)	Qualification to Champions League group stage
2	Anderlecht	34	24	5	5	75	30	+45	77	Qualification to Champions League third qualifying round
3	Club Brugge	34	18	5	11	59	50	+9	59	Qualification to Europa League third qualifying round
4	Gent	34	17	8	9	67	42	+25	59	Qualification to Europa League second qualifying round
5	Zulte Waregem	34	16	7	11	55	36	+19	55	
6	Westerlo	34	15	7	12	42	38	+4	52	
7	Lokeren	34	13	12	9	40	32	+8	51	
8	Genk	34	15	5	14	48	51	−3	50	Qualification to Europa League play-off round (Note: Genk qualified for the play-off round of the UEFA Europa League by winning the 2008–09 Belgian Cup.)
9	Cercle Brugge	34	14	5	15	48	53	−5	47	
10	Mechelen	34	12	10	12	46	52	−6	46	
11	Mouscron	34	12	8	14	42	49	−7	44	
12	Charleroi	34	12	7	15	43	48	−5	43	
13	Germinal Beerschot	34	11	9	14	44	42	+2	42	
14	Kortrijk	34	9	11	14	37	55	−18	38	
15	Dender (R)	34	9	8	17	44	58	−14	35	Qualification to the Relegation play-offs
16	Roeselare (O)	34	8	6	20	33	59	−26	30	Qualification to the Relegation play-offs
17	Tubize (R)	34	7	6	21	35	77	−42	27	Relegation to 2009–10 Belgian Second Division
18	Mons (R)	34	3	10	21	31	57	−26	19	Relegation to 2009–10 Belgian Second Division

Source: soccerway.com
Rules for classification: 1) points; 2) number of matches won; if teams are still tied a playoff is organised.
(C) Champions; (O) Play-off winners; (R) Relegated

=== Belgian Second Division ===
Pos	Team	Pld	W	D	L	GF	GA	GD	Pts	Promotion or relegation
1	Sint-Truiden (C, P)	36	24	8	4	72	29	+43	80	Belgian First Division
2	Lierse (P)	36	22	9	5	75	40	+35	75	Belgian Second Division final round
3	Antwerp	36	17	10	9	55	32	+23	61	Belgian Second Division final round
4	Waasland	36	16	7	13	56	48	+8	55	Belgian Second Division final round
5	Tournai	36	14	12	10	53	41	+12	54	Belgian Second Division final round
6	Tienen	36	14	11	11	58	49	+9	53	
7	Oostende	36	13	14	9	54	51	+3	53	
8	Ronse	36	15	7	14	54	52	+2	52	
9	KVSK United	36	14	9	13	48	38	+10	51	
10	Brussels	36	12	13	11	50	37	+13	49	
11	RFC Liège	36	11	15	10	49	48	+1	48	
12	OH Leuven	36	12	10	14	46	48	−2	46	
13	Beveren	36	11	12	13	47	57	−10	45	
14	Eupen	36	12	7	17	47	63	−16	43	
15	Olympic Charleroi (R)	36	10	9	17	48	65	−17	39	Relegation to Belgian Third Division final round
16	Virton (R)	36	9	12	15	46	58	−12	39	Relegation to Belgian Third Division final round
17	Hamme (R)	36	9	9	18	48	64	−16	36	Relegation to Belgian Third Division final round
18	Deinze (R)	36	7	15	14	46	65	−19	36	Relegation to Belgian Third Division
19	UR Namur (R)	36	2	7	27	22	89	−67	13	Relegation to Belgian Third Division

Source: Belgian Second Division
Rules for classification: 1) points; 2) number of matches won; if teams are still tied a playoff is organised.
(C) Champions; (P) Promoted; (R) Relegated

== European Club Results ==
Note that the Belgian team's score is given first

As Cercle Brugge did not desire to play in the Intertoto Cup, Germinal Beerschot took their place but where immediately eliminated. Anderlecht suffered a painful defeat to BATE Borisov in the second qualification round of the Champions League, which did not even send them into the UEFA Cup. Gent also performed weak, losing immediately in their first match. Club Brugge got into the group stage but after drawing in every match against mostly weaker opponents, they finally succumbed at home to Copenhagen. Champions Standard Liège however provided stunning football as they came very close to keeping Liverpool out of the Champions League and then dropped into the UEFA Cup where they beat teams such as Everton, Sevilla, Partizan and Sampdoria before eventually going out against Braga in the last 16.

Date	Team	Competition	Round	Leg	Opponent	Location	Score
July 5 or 6	Germinal Beerschot	Intertoto Cup	Round 2	Leg 1, Home	(Azerbaijan) Neftchi Baku	Het Kiel, Antwerp	1–1
July 12 or 13	Germinal Beerschot	Intertoto Cup	Round 2	Leg 2, Away	(Azerbaijan) Neftchi Baku	Tofik Bakhramov Stadium, Baku	0–1
July 29 or 30	Anderlecht	Champions League	Qual. Round 2	Leg 1, Home	(Belarus) BATE Borisov	Constant Vanden Stock Stadium, Anderlecht	1–2
August 5 or 6	Anderlecht	Champions League	Qual. Round 2	Leg 2, Away	(Belarus) BATE Borisov	Haradzki Stadium, Barysaw	2–2
August 12 or 13	Standard Liège	Champions League	Qual. Round 3	Leg 1, Home	(England) Liverpool	Stade Maurice Dufrasne, Liège	0–0
August 14	Gent	UEFA Cup	Qual. Round 2	Leg 1, Home	(Sweden) Kalmar FF	Jules Ottenstadion, Ghent	2–1
August 21	Gent	UEFA Cup	Qual. Round 2	Leg 2, Away	(Sweden) Kalmar FF	Fredriksskans, Kalmar	0–4
August 26 or 27	Standard Liège	Champions League	Qual. Round 3	Leg 2, Away	(England) Liverpool	Anfield, Liverpool	0–1 (aet)
September 18	Club Brugge	UEFA Cup	Round 1	Leg 1, Away	(Switzerland) Young Boys	Stade de Suisse, Bern	2–2
September 18	Standard Liège	UEFA Cup	Round 1	Leg 1, Away	(England) Everton	Goodison Park, Liverpool	2–2
October 2	Club Brugge	UEFA Cup	Round 1	Leg 2, Home	(Switzerland) Young Boys	Jan Breydel Stadium, Bruges	2–0
October 2	Standard Liège	UEFA Cup	Round 1	Leg 2, Home	(England) Everton	Stade Maurice Dufrasne, Liège	2–1
October 23	Club Brugge	UEFA Cup	Group Stage	Match 1, Away	(Norway) Rosenborg	Lerkendal stadion, Trondheim	0–0
November 6	Standard Liège	UEFA Cup	Group Stage	Match 1, Home	(Spain) Sevilla	Stade Maurice Dufrasne, Liège	1–0
November 27	Club Brugge	UEFA Cup	Group Stage	Match 2, Home	(France) Saint-Étienne	Jan Breydel Stadium, Bruges	1–1
November 27	Standard Liège	UEFA Cup	Group Stage	Match 2, Away	(Serbia) Partizan	Partizan Stadium, Belgrade	1–0
December 3	Standard Liège	UEFA Cup	Group Stage	Match 3, Home	(Italy) Sampdoria	Stade Maurice Dufrasne, Liège	3–0
December 4	Club Brugge	UEFA Cup	Group Stage	Match 3, Away	(Spain) Valencia	Estadio Mestalla, Valencia	1–1
December 17	Club Brugge	UEFA Cup	Group Stage	Match 4, Home	(Denmark) Copenhagen	Jan Breydel Stadium, Bruges	0–1
December 18	Standard Liège	UEFA Cup	Group Stage	Match 4, Away	(Germany) Stuttgart	Mercedes-Benz Arena, Stuttgart	0–3
February 18	Standard Liège	UEFA Cup	Round of 32	Leg 1, Home	(Portugal) Braga	Estádio Municipal de Braga, Braga	0–3
February 26	Standard Liège	UEFA Cup	Round of 32	Leg 2, Away	(Portugal) Braga	Stade Maurice Dufrasne, Liège	1–1

== European qualification for 2008–09 summary ==
Competition	Qualifiers	Reason for Qualification
UEFA Champions League	Standard Liège	1st in Jupiler League
UEFA Champions League Third Qualifying Round for Non-Champions	Anderlecht	2nd in Jupiler League
UEFA Europa League Third Qualifying Round	Club Brugge	3rd in Jupiler League
UEFA Europa League Second Qualifying Round	Gent	4th in Jupiler League
UEFA Europa League Fourth Qualifying Round	Genk	Cup winner

== See also ==
- Jupiler League 2008-09
- Belgian Cup 2008-09
- 2009 Belgian Super Cup
- Belgian Second Division
- Belgian Third Division A
- Belgian Third Division B
