= Dessy =

Dessy is an Italian surname. Notable people with the surname include:

- Elisabetta Dessy (born 1957), Italian swimmer, model and actress
- Christophe Dessy (born 1966), Belgian former footballer and manager
- Angelo Dessy (1907–1983), Italian actor

== See also ==
- Dessy Hinds, rapper of the American hip-hop collective Pro Era
