= 2008–09 Belgian Cup =

Tournament details
- Country: Belgium

Final positions
- Champions: Genk
- Runners-up: KV Mechelen

The Belgian Cup 2008–09 was the 54th season of the main knockout football competition in Belgium. It is commonly named Cofidis Cup, after its sponsor Cofidis. It was won by Genk.

== Bracket ==
Sixth round
Gent	3
D2	OH Leuven	0
Mouscron	3
Tubize	1
Genk	6
D3	Seraing	0
D3	Diegem	1
Lokeren	2
Germinal Beerschot	1
D3	RC Mechelen	4
D2	KV Oostende	0
Zulte-Waregem	1
D3	Dessel	1
Dender	3
Mons	0
D2	Lierse	2
Cercle Brugge	2
D3	Mol-Wezel	1
Charleroi	3
D2	Ronse	1
Club Brugge	1
D2	Beveren	0
D3	Turnhout	1
Roeselare	4
KV Mechelen	4
D3	Veldwezelt	2
Anderlecht	3
D2	Tournai	1
Kortrijk	1 (3)
Standard Liège	1 (2)
D2	KVSK United	1
Westerlo	2

Seventh round
Gent	2
Mouscron	1
Genk	1
Lokeren	0
D3	RC Mechelen	0 (10)
Zulte-Waregem	0 (9)
Dender	2
D2	Lierse	3
Cercle Brugge	2*
Charleroi	1*
Club Brugge	0
Roeselare	1
KV Mechelen	2
Anderlecht	1
Kortrijk	3
Westerlo	1

Quarter-finals
Gent	1 0*
Genk	0 2*
D3	RC Mechelen	1 0
D2	Lierse	0 3
Cercle Brugge	1 1
Roeselare	0 2
KV Mechelen	1 0
Kortrijk	0 0

Semi-finals
Genk	2 4
D2	Lierse	2 1
Cercle Brugge	2 1*
KV Mechelen	1 2*

Final
Genk	2
KV Mechelen	0

=== Legend ===
- * = after extra-time
- D2 = second division
- D3 = third division

== Results ==
In the first two rounds, teams from the provincial leagues and promotion division played each other. In the third round, teams from the third division joined in. Round four was the starting point for the teams from the second division. After the fifth round, only 14 teams remained.

=== Round 6 ===
Teams from the Belgian First Division 2008–09Jupiler Pro League entered the competition at this stage. Teams from the first division were seeded and couldn't meet each other, except for the newly promoted teams, Kortrijk and Tubize, who did not belong to this seeded group.

Apart from the 18 teams directly qualified, 14 other teams had qualified through winning in the fifth round:

- 7 teams from Second Division (D2): Beveren, OH Leuven, Lierse, KV Oostende, Ronse, Tournai and KVSK United.
- 7 teams from Third Division (D3): Dessel, Diegem, RC Mechelen, Mol-Wezel, Seraing, Turnhout and Veldwezelt.

The draw was made on September 3, 2008.

11 November 2008	Cercle Brugge	2–1	Mol-Wezel (D3)	Bruges
15:00 CET	De Smet 14'; Gombami 35'		Jansen 9'	Stadium: Jan Breydel Stadion

11 November 2008	Dessel (D3)	1–3	Dender	Denderleeuw
16:00 CET	Didier 36'		Blondelle 45'; Destorme 70'; Sylla 82'	Stadium: Florent Beeckmanstadion

11 November 2008	KV Oostende (D2)	0–1	Zulte-Waregem	Ostend
16:00 CET			Leye 35'	Stadium: Albertpark

11 November 2008	Turnhout (D3)	1–4	Roeselare	Turnhout
16:00 CET	Janssens 52'		Janssens 11' (o.g.); Tanghe 26'; Mulisa 49'; Dissa 65'	Stadium: Stadsparkstadion

11 November 2008	Mons	0–2	Lierse (D2)	Mons
16:00 CET			J. Mertens 74'; J. Cavens 86'	Stadium: Stade Charles Tondreau

11 November 2008	Diegem (D3)	1–2	Lokeren	Lokeren
16:00 CET	Vanhamel 22'		Touré 45'; Van Grunderbeeck 90' (o.g.)	Stadium: Daknamstadion

11 November 2008	Mouscron	3–1	Tubize	Mouscron
18:00 CET	Okwunwanne 11', 29'; Lepoint 38'		Chantry 90' (o.g.)	Stadium: Stade Le Canonnier

11 November 2008	Anderlecht	3–1	Tournai (D2)	Brussels
18:00 CET	Losada 12'; Legear 67'; Suárez 86'		Frutos 21'	Stadium: Constant Vanden Stock Stadium

11 November 2008	Genk	6–0	Seraing (D3)	Genk
19:00 CET	Dugary 12'; Nemec 42', 45', 69'; Soetaers 61'; Bošnjak 75'			Stadium: Cristal Arena

11 November 2008	Gent	3–0	OH Leuven (D2)	Ghent
19:00 CET	Foley 12'; Sorokin 33'; Azofeifa 57'			Stadium: Jules Ottenstadion

11 November 2008	KV Mechelen	4–2	Veldwezelt (D3)	Mechelen
20:00 CET	Vleminckx 68', 90', 90'; Rossini 85'		Baidjoe 28'; Henke 70'	Stadium: Veolia Stadium Achter de Kazerne

11 November 2008	KVSK United (D2)	1–2	Westerlo	Lommel
20:00 CET	Ketting 17'		Scheelen 40'; Ruiz 46'	Stadium: Stedelijk Sportstadion

12 November 2008	Charleroi	3–1	Ronse (D2)	Charleroi
20:00 CET	Bia 35', 64'; Habibou 84'		Broyer 69'	Stadium: Stade du Pays de Charleroi

12 November 2008	Club Brugge	1–0	Beveren (D2)	Bruges
20:00 CET	Clement 45'			Stadium: Jan Breydel Stadion

12 November 2008	Germinal Beerschot	1–4	RC Mechelen (D3)	Antwerp}
20:30 CET	Vandenbergh 59'		Verstraeten 28'; Calicchio 52'; Silva 73', 90'	Stadium: Olympisch Stadion

12 November 2008	Kortrijk	1–1 (a.e.t.) (3–2 p)	Standard Liège	Kortrijk
20:45 CET	Coulibaly 9'		Mbokani 22'	Stadium: Guldensporen Stadion
	Penalties
	Kums (penalty missed); Ibou (penalty scored); Verbrugghe (penalty scored); Barbosa (penalty scored)		(penalty scored) Mbokani; (penalty missed) Toama; (penalty scored) Dante; (penalty missed) Marcos; (penalty missed) Dalmat

=== Round 7 ===
The draw for the seventh round and the quarterfinals was made on November 21, 2008. The match between Cercle Brugge and Charleroi was postponed from January 13 to January 21 due to insufficient pitch conditions.

11 January 2009	Club Brugge	0–1	Roeselare	Bruges
15:00 CET			Perišić 50'	Stadium: Jan Breydel Stadion

13 January 2009	Dender	2–3	Lierse (D2)	Denderleeuw
20:30 CET	Destorme 54', 69'		Wahed 59'; Dreesen 81'; Radzinski 91'	Stadium: Florent Beeckmanstadion

13 January 2009	KV Mechelen	2–1	Anderlecht	Mechelen
20:45 CET	Vleminckx 18' (pen.); Mununga 50'		Rnić 29'	Stadium: Veolia Stadium Achter de Kazerne

14 January 2009	Genk	1–0	Lokeren	Genk
20:30 CET	Vossen 36'			Stadium: Cristal Arena

14 January 2009	RC Mechelen (D3)	0–0 (a.e.t.) (10–9 p)	Zulte-Waregem	Mechelen
20:30 CET				Stadium: Oscar Vankesbeeck Stadion
	Penalties
	Casagolda (penalty scored); Marcos (penalty missed); El Ayadi (penalty scored); T. Scheers (penalty scored); Silva (penalty scored); Verstappen (penalty scored); Engelen (penalty scored); Claessens (penalty scored); Goessens (penalty scored); Nnaji (penalty scored); Clepkens (penalty scored)		(penalty scored) Leye; (penalty scored) Berrier; (penalty scored) Taravel; (penalty scored) Roelandts; (penalty missed) Minne; (penalty scored) Van Nieuwenhuyze; (penalty scored) Van Zundert; (penalty scored) Roelandts; (penalty scored) Colpaert; (penalty scored) Subotić; (penalty missed) Bossut

14 January 2009	Gent	2–1	Mouscron	Ghent
20:30 CET	Ruiz 36'; Ljubijankić 72'		Deranja 94'	Stadium: Jules Ottenstadion

14 January 2009	Kortrijk	3–1	Westerlo	Kortrijk
20:30 CET	Coulibaly 39', 76', 84'		Van Hout 91'	Stadium: Guldensporen Stadion

21 January 2009	Cercle Brugge	2–1 (a.e.t.)	Charleroi	Bruges
20:00 CET	De Smet 48' (pen.); Snelders 106'		Mujangi Bia 37'	Stadium: Jan Breydel Stadion

=== Quarter-finals ===
The quarter-finals were two-legged.

==== First legs ====
27 January 2009	KV Mechelen	1–0	Kortrijk	Mechelen
20:30 CET	Persoons 74'			Stadium: Veolia Stadium Achter de Kazerne

28 January 2009	Cercle Brugge	1–0	Roeselare	Bruges
20:30 CET	Portier 26'			Stadium: Jan Breydel Stadion

28 January 2009	RC Mechelen (D3)	1–0	Lierse (D2)	Mechelen
20:30 CET	Calicchio 74'			Stadium: Oscar Vankesbeeck Stadion

28 January 2009	Gent	1–0	Genk	Ghent
20:45 CET	Ruiz 37'			Stadium: Jules Ottenstadion

==== Second legs ====
The matches Kortrijk–KV Mechelen and Roeselare–Cercle Brugge were postponed to 17 February due to insufficient pitch conditions.

4 February 2009	Lierse (D2)	3–0 (3–1 agg.)	RC Mechelen (D3)	Lier
20:30 CET	Wahed 27'; Cavens 36' (pen.); Radzinski 79'			Stadium: Herman Vanderpoortenstadion

4 February 2009	Genk	2–0 (a.e.t.) (2–1 agg.)	Gent	Genk
20:45 CET	Vossen 32'; Alex 96' (pen.)			Stadium: Cristal Arena

17 February 2009	Kortrijk	0–0 (0–1 agg.)	KV Mechelen	Kortrijk
20:30 CET				Stadium: Guldensporen Stadion

17 February 2009	Roeselare	2–1 (2–2a agg.)	Cercle Brugge	Roeselare
20:30 CET	Perišić 8', 79' (pen.)		Serebrennikov 34'	Stadium: Schiervelde Stadion

=== Semi-finals ===
The semifinals were also two-legged. The draw was made on February 10, 2009.

==== First legs ====
3 March 2009	Genk	2–2	Lierse (D2)	Genk
20:45 CET	Barda 13' (pen.); De Mul 74'		De Witte 23'; Tshiala 61'	Stadium: Cristal Arena

4 March 2009	Cercle Brugge	2–1	KV Mechelen	Bruges
20:45 CET	Gombani 61'; De Smet 75'		Vleminckx 82'	Stadium: Jan Breydel Stadion

==== Second legs ====
21 April 2009	KV Mechelen	2–1 (a.e.t.) (3–3 agg.) (5–3 p)	Cercle Brugge	Mechelen
20:45 CEST	Vleminckx 28'; Mununga 68'		Sergeant 45'	Stadium: Veolia Stadium Achter de Kazerne

22 April 2009	Lierse (D2)	1–4 (3–6 agg.)	Genk	Lier
20:45 CEST	Janssens 85'		De Mul 47', 90'; Huysegems 53', 88'	Stadium: Herman Vanderpoortenstadion

=== Final ===
23 May 2009
20:45 CET

Genk	2–0	KV Mechelen
Ogunjimi 42', 62'

King Baudouin Stadium, Brussels
Attendance: 45.000
Referee: Frank De Bleeckere
