= 2002 UEFA European Under-21 Championship qualification play-offs =

Football tournament qualification play-offs

The play-off first legs were played on 9–11 November 2001, while the second legs were played on 13–14 November 2001. Winners of play-off round qualified to the championship played following year in May, where Switzerland was chosen to host the fixtures.

== Matches ==
Team 1	Agg.	Team 2	1st leg	2nd leg
Sweden	3–4	Belgium	3–2	0–2
Greece	4–2	Turkey	3–0	1–2
Netherlands	2–3	England	2–2	0–1
Spain	2–2 (a)	Portugal	2–1	0–1
Croatia	1–1 (a)	Czech Republic	1–1	0–0
Poland	2–5	Italy	2–5	0–0
Romania	0–5	France	0–1	0–4
Ukraine	2–4	Switzerland	1–2	1–2

== First leg ==
9 November 2001
19:00

Sweden	3 – 2	Belgium
Berglund 6'; Källström 50'; Wilhelmsson 89'	Report	Vandooren 44'; Soetaers 64'

Olympia, Helsingborg
Attendance: 847
Referee: Željko Širić (Croatia)

9 November 2001
20:00

Greece	3 – 0	Turkey
Vakouftsis 6'; Salpingidis 88'; Amanatidis 90+2'	Report

Zosimades Stadium, Ioannina
Attendance: 6,400
Referee: Laurent Duhamel (France)

9 November 2001
20:15

Netherlands	2 – 2	England
van der Vaart 25'; Kuyt 37'	Report	Davis 45'; Dunn 58'

Stadion Galgenwaard, Utrecht
Attendance: 14,000
Referee: Paulo Costa (Portugal)

10 November 2001
15:30

Romania	0 – 1	France
	Report	Malbranque 10'

Stadionul Cotroceni, Bucharest
Attendance: 8,000
Referee: Attila Hanacsek (Hungary)

10 November 2001
17:30

Croatia	1 – 1	Czech Republic
Andrić 21'	Report	Vachoušek 30'

Stadion Poljud, Split
Attendance: 4,241
Referee: Eduardo Iturralde González (Spain)

10 November 2001
18:00

Poland	2 – 5	Italy
Lewandowski 87'; Gorawski 90+1'	Report	Bonazzoli 4', 38'; Ferrari 45'; Maccarone 79'; Iaquinta 90+2'

Polish Army Stadium, Warsaw
Attendance: 2,276
Referee: Tom Henning Øvrebø (Norway)

10 November 2001
19:00

Spain	2 – 1	Portugal
Couñago 25'; Xisco 81'	Report	Postiga 32'

Nuevo Estadio de La Victoria, Jaén
Attendance: 9,087
Referee: Orhan Erdemir (Turkey)

11 November 2001
16:00

Ukraine	1 – 2	Switzerland
Voronin 71'	Report	Frei 39'; Muff 90'

Valeriy Lobanovskiy Stadium, Kyiv
Attendance: 2,000
Referee: Martin Ingvarsson (Sweden)

== Second leg ==
13 November 2001
17:00

Czech Republic	0 – 0	Croatia
	Report

Na Stínadlech, Teplice
Attendance: 5,260
Referee: Massimo Busacca (Switzerland)

1–1 on aggregate, Czech Republic won on away goals rule.

13 November 2001
19:30

Turkey	2 – 1	Greece
Akın 26'; Güldüren 80' (pen.)	Report	Nastos 57'

Ismet Pasa Stadium, İzmit
Attendance: 9,000
Referee: Helmut Fleischer (Germany)

Greece won 4–2 on aggregate

13 November 2001
20:00

Belgium	2 – 0	Sweden
De Wilde 8'; Vandooren 20'	Report

Jules Ottenstadion, Ghent
Attendance: 2,097
Referee: Tomasz Mikulski (Poland)

Belgium won 4–3 on aggregate

13 November 2001
20:45

England	1 – 0	Netherlands
Carrick 72'	Report

Pride Park Stadium, Derby
Attendance: 32,418
Referee: Vladimír Hriňák (Slovakia)

England won 3–2 on aggregate

13 November 2001
22:00

Portugal	1 – 0	Spain
Leal 77'	Report

Estádio de São Luís, Faro
Attendance: 6,200
Referee: Cosimo Bolognino (Italy)

2–2 on aggregate, Portugal won on away goals rule.

14 November 2001
17:30

France	4 – 0	Romania
Sorlin 13', 60'; Cissé 39', 41'	Report

Stade Francis-Le Blé, Brest
Attendance: 7,719
Referee: Michael Riley (England)

France won 5–0 on aggregate

14 November 2001
19:30

Switzerland	2 – 1	Ukraine
Cabanas 70' (pen.); Frei 78' (pen.)	Report	Akopyan 63'

Stadion Brügglifeld, Aarau
Attendance: 2,500
Referee: Sorin Corpodean (Romania)

Switzerland won 4–2 on aggregate

14 November 2001
21:00

Italy	0 – 0	Poland
	Report

Stadio Oreste Granillo, Reggio Calabria
Attendance: 6,038
Referee: Luc Huyghe (Belgium)

Italy won 5–2 on aggregate
