= Fadel Brahami =

Algerian footballer (born 1978)

Personal information
- Full name: Mohamed Fadel Brahami
- Date of birth: June 27, 1978 (age 48)
- Place of birth: Bondy, Paris, France
- Height: 1.84 m (6 ft 0 in)
- Position: Midfielder

Youth career
- 1993–1995: ES du Blanc Mesnil

Senior career*
Years	Team	Apps	(Gls)
1996–1997	Aubervilliers	5	(1)
1999–2003	Le Havre	43	(3)
2004–2006	La Louvière	47	(4)
2006–2009	Mons	86	(9)
2009–2010	AEP Paphos	13	(2)
2011–2013	Minyor Pernik	43	(6)

International career
2003–2006	Algeria	16	(0)
- * Club domestic league appearances and goals

Mohamed Fadel Brahami (Arabic: محمد براهامي; born June 27, 1978) is an Algerian former professional footballer who played as a midfielder.

== International career ==
Brahami received his first call-up to the Algeria national team when Georges Leekens called him up for a friendly against Angola on March 29, 2003. He played the full 90 minutes in the right-back position with the game ending 1–1.

== Career statistics ==
Algeria national team
Year	Apps	Goals
2003	4	0
2004	6	0
2005	4	0
2006	2	0
Total	16	0
