= Romain Haghedooren =

Belgian footballer (born 1986)

Personal information
- Full name: Romain Haghedooren
- Date of birth: 28 September 1986 (age 40)
- Place of birth: Menen, Belgium
- Position: Defender

Youth career
- 1991–1994: Bas-Warneton
- 1994–1995: Eendracht Wervik
- 1995–2004: Mouscron

Senior career*
Years	Team	Apps	(Gls)
2004–2009	Mouscron	29	(1)
2007–2008	→ OH Leuven (loan)	20	(1)
2009–2010	Tournai	23	(5)
2010–2012	Brussels	49	(2)
2012–2013	Roeselare	0	(0)
2013–2016	Sint-Eloois-Winkel	0	(0)
2016–2018	Torhout	0	(0)
2018–2019	Dadizele	0	(0)
2019	Deerlijk	0	(0)
- * Club domestic league appearances and goals as of 20 June 2012

Romain Haghedooren (born 28 September 1986) is a Belgian retired professional footballer who last played for Deerlijk as a defender.

In 2005, Haghedooren was given the chance to play in the first team of Mouscron, at the highest level of Belgian football, but his real breakthrough came in the following season, playing a decent 16 matches. Still, Mouscron decided to loan out Haghedooren for one season to second division team OH Leuven. Haghedooren returned to Mouscron for the 2008–09 season, after which his contract ended and he was allowed to leave as a free player. Thereafter, he moved to the second division again, playing for Tournai, Brussels and Roeselare.
