= Alexandre Teklak =

Belgian footballer

Personal information
- Date of birth: 16 August 1975 (age 51)
- Place of birth: Charleroi, Belgium
- Height: 1.81 m (5 ft 11 1/2 in)
- Position: Defender

Team information
- Current team: RJS Heppignies-Lambusart-Fleurus
- Number: 22

Youth career
- US Courcelles

Senior career*
Years	Team	Apps	(Gls)
1999–2009	R.E. Mouscron	225	(2)
2005–2006	RAA Louvieroise → loan	32	(0)
2010–	RJS Heppignies-Lambusart-Fleurus		
- * Club domestic league appearances and goals as of 17 July 2009 ‡ National team caps and goals as of 26 April 2009

Alexandre Teklak (born 16 August 1975 in Charleroi) is a Belgian football player who currently plays for RJS Heppignies-Lambusart-Fleurus.
