= Oscar Vankesbeeck Stadion =

Football stadium

Coordinates: 51°2′16″N 4°28′18″E

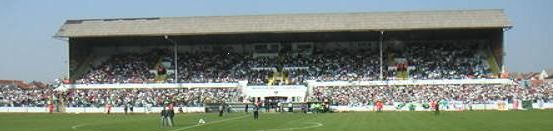
- Interactive map of Oscar Vankesbeeck Stadion
- Location: Mechelen, Belgium
- Capacity: 6,123
- Surface: Grass

Construction
- Opened: 1923
- Renovated: 1947

Tenant
- KRC Mechelen

The Oscar Vankesbeesckstadion is a football stadium, located in Mechelen, Belgium, and is host to K.R.C. Mechelen. With a capacity of 6,123.

The stadium, located Oscar Vankesbeeckstraat, is named after Oscar Van Kesbeeck, a Flemish politician, who was chairman of the Belgian Football Association between 1937 and 1943, and a former chairman and player of Racing Mechelen. It is located about 1.5 kilometers far from the Veolia Stadium of rivals KV Mechelen.
