= Patrick Greveraars =

Dutch football manager (born 1975)

Personal information
- Date of birth: 14 August 1975 (age 51)
- Place of birth: Eindhoven, Netherlands

Managerial career
- Years: Team
- 1995–2007: PSV (youth)
- 2007–2011: Porto (youth)
- 2011–2012: Willem II (youth)
- 2012–2014: Vitesse (assistant)
- 2014–2016: Feyenoord (assistant)
- 2016–2017: Shabab Al Ahli (assistant)
- 2018–2019: Anorthosis (assistant)
- 2019–2020: Al Jazira (assistant)
- 2021: Ghana (assistant)
- 2022: Lommel
- 2022–2024: NEC Nijmegen
- 2026–: Bayer 04 Leverkusen U19

Patrick Greveraars (born 14 August 1975) is a Dutch football manager who manages Bayer 04 Leverkusen U19.

== Career ==
In 2007, Greveraars was appointed youth manager of Portuguese top flight side Porto. In 2016, he was appointed assistant of Shabab Al Ahli in the United Arab Emirates. In 2018, he was appointed assistant manager of Cypriot club Anorthosis.

In 2019, Greveraars was appointed assistant manager of Al Jazira in the United Arab Emirates. In 2021, he was appointed assistant manager of Ghana. In 2022, he was appointed manager of Belgian team Lommel.

In June 2026 he was appointed head coach of the Bayer 04 Leverkusen U19.
