= Aboubakar Sidibé =

French footballer (born 1996)

Personal information
- Date of birth: 3 May 1996 (age 30)
- Place of birth: France
- Height: 1.80 m (5 ft 11 in)
- Position: Forward

Youth career
- –2015: Clermont

Senior career*
Years	Team	Apps	(Gls)
2015–2017	Clermont B	37	(8)
2017	Clermont	2	(0)
2017–2018	Fréjus Saint-Raphaël	5	(1)
2018–2019	Fréjus Saint-Raphaël B		
2019–2020	Thiers	15	(3)
2020–2022	Clermont B	3	(0)
2021–2022	Clermont	1	(0)
2022	Virton	8	(1)
2024–2025	FC Courtételle		
- * Club domestic league appearances and goals

Aboubakar "Bouba" Sidibé (born 3 May 1996) is a French professional footballer who plays as a forward.

== Career ==
Sidibé began his career at Clermont. He left the club in 2017, and went on to play for Fréjus Saint-Raphaël and Thiers. In 2020, he returned to Clermont on an amateur contract. On 4 January 2022, Sidibé joined Belgian club Virton, where he signed his first professional contract.

== Personal life ==
Born in France, Sidibé is of Malian descent. He has both French and Malian citizenship.
