= 2009–10 Belgian Second Division =

Belgian Second Division
- Season: 2009–10
- Champions: Lierse
- Promoted: Lierse; Eupen
- Relegated: Liège; Beveren; Ronse

The 2009–10 season of the Belgian Second Division (also known as EXQI League for sponsorship reasons) started on Wednesday 19 August and is the second tier football league in Belgium. The league was played by 19 teams, with 36 matchdays, so each team plays the 18 other teams twice. The season was divided into 2 periods. Each period winner qualifies for the Belgian Second Division final round.

== Team changes ==
After promotion and relegation, only 13 teams remained in the league, with 6 other being replaced:

=== In ===
- R.A.E.C. Mons relegated from the First Division
- F.C. Tubize relegated from the First Division
- Dender lost the second division final round and as a result they were also relegated from the First Division.
- Standaard Wetteren promoted from Third Division A
- Turnhout promoted from Third Division B
- Boussu Dour Borinage promoted after winning the third division playoffs

=== Out ===
- Sint-Truidense was promoted to the Pro League
- Olympic Charleroi lost the third division playoffs and was subsequently relegated.
- Excelsior Virton lost the third division playoffs and was subsequently relegated.
- K.F.C. V.W. Hamme lost the third division playoffs and was subsequently relegated.
- K.M.S.K. Deinze was relegated to the Third Division.
- UR Namur was relegated to the Third Division.

== Team information ==
=== Personnel and locations ===
Club	City	Current manager
Royal Antwerp FC	Antwerp	
K.S.K. Beveren	Beveren	
R. Boussu Dour Borinage	Boussu	
K.A.S. Eupen	Eupen	
R.F.C. de Liège	Liège	
K. Lierse S.K.	Lier	
R.A.E.C. Mons	Mons	
FC Molenbeek Brussels Strombeek	Molenbeek-Saint-Jean	
K.V. Oostende	Ostend	
Oud-Heverlee Leuven	Leuven	
K.V. Red Star Waasland	Sint-Niklaas	
K.S.K. Ronse	Ronse	
Standaard Wetteren	Wetteren	
K.V.K. Tienen	Tienen	
R.F.C. Tournai	Tournai	
F.C. Tubize	Tubize	
K.F.C. Turnhout	Turnhout	
K.V.S.K. United Overpelt-Lommel	Lommel	
F.C. Verbroedering Dender E.H.	Denderleeuw	

== Regular season ==
=== League table ===
Pos	Team	Pld	W	D	L	GF	GA	GD	Pts	Promotion or relegation
1	Lierse (C, P)	36	21	12	3	75	32	+43	75	Belgian First Division
2	Lommel	36	20	10	6	55	27	+28	70	Qualification for Belgian Second Division final round
3	Mons	36	19	9	8	56	32	+24	66	Qualification for Belgian Second Division final round
4	Eupen (O, P)	36	16	12	8	56	37	+19	60	Qualification for Belgian Second Division final round
5	Borinage	36	13	14	9	46	43	+3	53	
6	Waasland	36	13	13	10	46	49	−3	52	
7	Oostende	36	12	15	9	49	45	+4	51	
8	Antwerp	36	10	17	9	55	53	+2	47	
9	OH Leuven	36	11	12	13	50	66	−16	45	
10	Wetteren	36	12	8	16	48	59	−11	44	
11	Tournai	36	11	11	14	50	51	−1	44	
12	Tienen	36	11	10	15	44	58	−14	43	
13	Dender	36	10	13	13	45	49	−4	43	
14	Brussels	36	11	9	16	47	53	−6	42	
15	Tubize	36	9	15	12	41	41	0	42	
16	Turnhout	36	10	11	15	50	57	−7	41	
17	Ronse (R)	36	10	9	17	51	57	−6	39	Qualification for Relegation play-off
18	Beveren (D, R)	36	8	12	16	37	55	−18	36	Relegation to Belgian Third Division
19	RFC Liège (R)	36	5	8	23	23	60	−37	23	Relegation to Belgian Third Division

Updated to match(es) played on 27 May 2010. Source: Soccerway
Rules for classification: 1) points; 2) number of matches won; if teams are still tied a playoff is organised.
(C) Champions; (D) Ceased operations for men’s team; (O) Play-off winners; (P) Promoted; (R) Relegated
