= Arsène Né =

Ivorian footballer

Personal information
- Full name: Arsène Né
- Date of birth: 4 January 1981 (age 45)
- Place of birth: Abidjan, Ivory Coast
- Height: 1.79 m (5 ft 10 in)
- Position: Defender

Youth career
- –1999: Mimosas Abidjan

Senior career*
| Years | Team | Apps | (Gls) |
| 1999–2001 | ASEC Mimosas | | |
| 2001–2004 | Beveren | 78 | (3) |
| 2004–2008 | Metalurh Donetsk | 49 | (0) |
| 2007–2008 | → Germinal Beerschot (loan) | 0 | (0) |
| 2009 | Eupen | 11 | (0) |
| 2010–2011 | Hasselt | 40 | (4) |
- * Club domestic league appearances and goals as of 25 August 2012

Arsène Né (born 4 January 1981 in Abidjan) is an Ivorian footballer. He is a central defender and last played for the Belgian club Hasselt. He previously played for several other clubs, including Beveren, Metalurh Donetsk and Germinal Beerschot.
