= Damien Miceli =

Belgian footballer

Personal information
- Date of birth: 17 October 1984 (age 42)
- Place of birth: Charleroi, Belgium
- Height: 1.79 m (5 ft 10 1/2 in)
- Position: Midfielder

Team information
- Current team: WS Woluwe FC
- Number: 14

Youth career
- Rensart
- Charleroi SC

Senior career*
Years	Team	Apps	(Gls)
2001–2002	Charleroi SC	4	(1)
2002–2003	RAA La Louviere	28	(7)
2003–2007	MVV	124	(12)
2007–2009	R. Charleroi S.C.	30	(1)
2009–2010	ROCCM	30	(8)
2010–	WS Woluwe FC		
- * Club domestic league appearances and goals

Damien Miceli (born 17 October 1984) is a Belgian football player, who currently plays for WS Woluwe FC.

== Career ==
The left midfielder previously played for MVV in the Dutch Eerste Divisie and Charleroi in the Belgian First Division.
