= Gonzague Vandooren =

Belgian footballer

Personal information
- Full name: Gonzague Vandooren
- Date of birth: 19 August 1979 (age 47)
- Place of birth: Mouscron, Belgium
- Height: 1.93 m (6 ft 4 in)
- Position: Defender

Team information
- Current team: Lierse
- Number: 11

Youth career
- Dottignies
- Mouscron

Senior career*
Years	Team	Apps	(Gls)
1996–2000	Mouscron	78	(12)
2000–2001	Lierse	17	(2)
2001–2005	Standard Liège	105	(10)
2005–2008	Genk	53	(4)
2008–2009	Mouscron	47	(4)
2010–2012	Lierse SK	34	(2)

International career
1998	Belgium U19	1	(0)
1999–2002	Belgium U21	15	(3)
- * Club domestic league appearances and goals

Gonzague Vandooren (born 19 August 1979 in Mouscron) is a retired Belgian professional football player who was last attached to Lierse SK, being released following the 2011–12 season. His position on the field is left back.
