= Hans Visser =

Dutch footballer and manager

Personal information
- Full name: Johannes Hermanus Visser
- Date of birth: 17 December 1966 (age 59)
- Place of birth: Alkmaar, Netherlands
- Height: 1.76 m (5 ft 9 1/2 in)
- Position: Midfielder

Team information
- Current team: NAC Breda (assistant manager)

Youth career
- 1976–1977: AZ
- 1977–1983: SV De Foresters

Senior career*
Years	Team	Apps	(Gls)
1983–1986	SV De Foresters		
1986–1989	AZ	67	(13)
1989–1991	Vitesse	35	(3)
1991–1995	MVV	123	(29)
1995–1997	Utrecht	57	(8)
1997–1999	Harelbeke	62	(15)
1999–2002	Groningen	47	(15)
2002–2003	IVS		

Managerial career
- 2003–2004: MVV (assistant)
- 2004–2006: Tongeren
- 2006–2008: Heerenveen (assistant)
- 2008–2009: Genk (assistant)
- 2009: Genk (caretaker)
- 2009–2015: Genk (assistant)
- 2015–2017: FC Krylia Sovetov Samara (assistant)
- 2016: FC Krylia Sovetov Samara (caretaker)
- 2017–2019: Roda JC Kerkrade (assistant)
- 2019–2020: OH Leuven (assistant)
- 2020–: NAC Breda (assistant)
- * Club domestic league appearances and goals

Johannes Hermanus "Hans" Visser (born 17 December 1966) is a Dutch football manager and a former player. He is the assistant manager for NAC Breda.

== Coaching career ==
He was the caretaker manager for FC Krylia Sovetov Samara in the Russian Premier League.
