= Christophe Dessy =

Belgian football manager

Personal information
- Date of birth: 8 March 1966 (age 60)
- Position: Defender

Team information
- Current team: Ajaccio (U17 manager)

Senior career*
Years	Team	Apps	(Gls)
1983–1989	Racing Jet Wavre		
1989–1992	R. Charleroi	24	(2)
1992–1994	Olympic Charleroi		
1995–1996	Francs Borains		
1996–1997	Racing Jet Wavre		
1997–1998	Olympic Charleroi		

Managerial career
- 1999–2002: Nancy (assistant)
- 2002–2004: Nancy (youth)
- 2004–2007: Standard Liège (youth)
- 2007–2008: Mons (youth)
- 2008–2009: Mons
- 2009–2010: FC Brussels
- 2012–2016: Standard Liège (youth)
- 2016–2018: Guingamp (youth)
- 2018–2019: Etoile du Sahel (youth)
- 2019–2021: Lyon (youth)
- 2021–2022: R. Charleroi (youth)
- 2022–: Ajaccio (U17)
- * Club domestic league appearances and goals

Christophe Dessy (born 8 March 1966) is a Belgian former football player and manager who played as a defender.

During his playing career, he played in the Belgian First Division A for Racing Jet Wavre and R. Charleroi S.C. After retiring he started working within football, mostly with youth development in French and Belgian clubs. In addition, he was the manager of R.A.E.C. Mons in 2008–09 and FC Brussels in 2009–10.

During his time at Standard Liège, Dessy oversaw the development of both Axel Witsel and Marouane Fellaini, "talents whose emergence is often attributed to Dessy".

After ending his two-year stint at En Avant Guingamp, he made his first sejour to another country, signing for Tunisian club Etoile du Sahel in 2018.

In 2021 he was brought back to his former club as a player, Charleroi. In 2022 he moved on to AC Ajaccio to take over as U17 coach.
