= Georges Leekens =

Belgian football manager (born 1949)

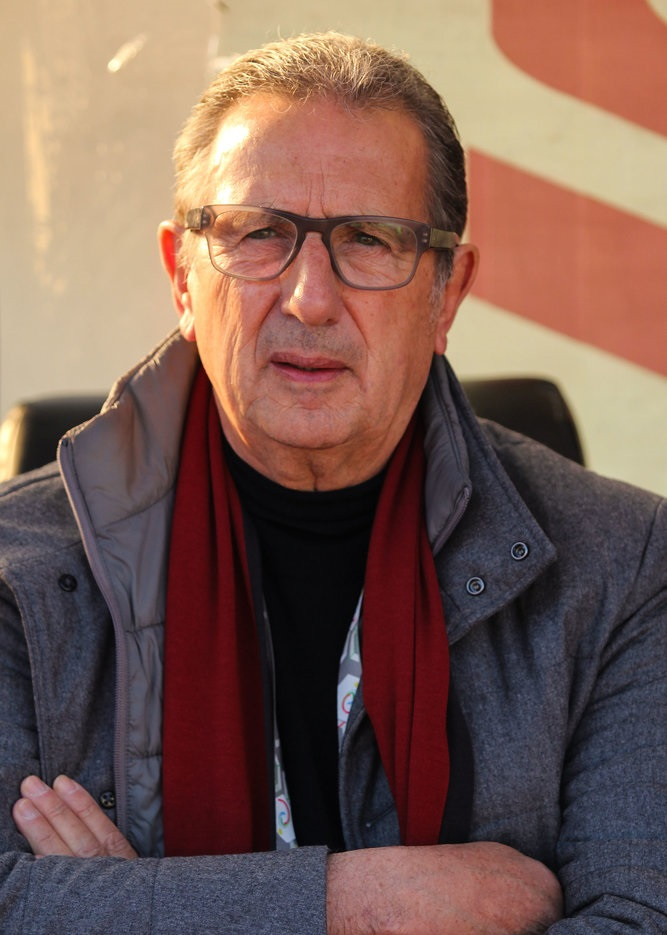
- Leekens in 2019

Personal information
- Date of birth: 18 May 1949 (age 77)
- Place of birth: Meeuwen, Belgium
- Position: Defender

Youth career
- 1958–1969: Sporting Houthalen

Senior career*
| Years | Team | Apps | (Gls) |
| 1969–1970 | Dessel Sport | | |
| 1970–1972 | Crossing Club | | |
| 1972–1981 | Club Brugge | | |
| 1981–1984 | Sint Niklase | | |

International career
| 1975–1978 | Belgium | 3 | (0) |

Managerial career
- 1984–1987: Cercle Brugge
- 1987–1988: Anderlecht
- 1988–1989: Kortrijk
- 1989–1991: Club Brugge
- 1991–1992: KV Mechelen
- 1992–1993: Trabzonspor
- 1993–1994: Cercle Brugge
- 1994–1995: Charleroi
- 1995–1997: Excelsior Mouscron
- 1997–1999: Belgium
- 1999–2001: Lokeren
- 2001–2002: Roda
- 2003: Algeria
- 2003–2004: Excelsior Mouscron
- 2004–2007: Gent
- 2007–2009: Lokeren
- 2009: Al Hilal
- 2009–2010: Kortrijk
- 2010–2012: Belgium
- 2012: Club Brugge
- 2014–2015: Tunisia
- 2015–2016: Lokeren
- 2016–2017: Algeria
- 2017–2018: Hungary
- 2018: Étoile du Sahel
- 2019: Tractor
- * Club domestic league appearances and goals

Georges Leekens (born 18 May 1949) is a Belgian football manager and former player. During his managerial career, he oversaw four national football teams: the Belgian, Tunisian, Algerian and Hungarian national football teams. He also managed numerous clubs in Belgium, the Netherlands, Turkey, Tunisia, Iran and Saudi Arabia.

== Playing career ==
Leekens debuted as a footballer in 1967 with Sporting Houthalen after leaving the lower ranks of the club. He played as a defender. In 1969, he signed for one year with Dessel Sport. After a brief stint at Crossing Club, he was transferred to Club Brugge. With the team, he reached the final of the European Cup in 1978 against Liverpool at Wembley in London, where a single goal defeated them. He also won five Belgian leagues, a Belgian Cup and a Belgian Super Cup in 1980, one year before joining Sint-Niklase, where he retired from football in 1984.

== Coaching career ==
=== Beginning ===
The same year of his retirement, Cercle Brugge signed him as coach for the next three seasons, eventually winning the Belgian Cup a year later. The same title was won with Anderlecht three years after winning it with the Cercle Brugge. After training Kortrijk, he came to Club Brugge to win the Belgian League, the Belgian Super Cup in 1990, the Belgian Cup and again the Belgian Super Cup in 1991. He also trained KV Mechelen and Trabzonspor, before returning to the Cercle Brugge and Charleroi and signing for Excelsior Mouscron, who had been promoted to the Belgian First Division after finishing first in the Belgian Second Division.

=== First spell with Belgium ===
In his first spell as Belgium national team coach, he led them to the 1998 FIFA World Cup finals after a two-legged win against the Republic of Ireland in the qualifying play-off. He was sacked from his role as federal coach after a disappointing third-place finish in the World Cup group stage after failing to qualify Belgium for the second round after drawing with the Netherlands, Mexico and South Korea.

=== Algeria ===
After a brief stint as coach of Lokeren and Roda JC, he was announced as the coach of Algeria at the end of 2002. He qualified for the 2004 African Cup of Nations in Tunisia. Still, he agreed with the Federation to rescind the contract for family reasons.

=== Back to Belgium and a short experience in the Persian Gulf ===
After his African sojourn, he returned to Excelsior Mouscron. Then, he signed for Gent for three years, before returning to Lokeren. In 2009, it was announced that he would be the new coach of Al-Hilal, but he was sacked three months after being defeated by Al-Shabab 3–0; he subsequently coached Kortrijk again for one season.

=== Second spell with Belgium ===
On 11 May 2010, Leekens signed a contract until 2012 to take over the Belgium national team for the second time. Consequently, he had to resign from his coaching role at Kortrijk.

On 12 April 2011, it was announced that Leekens's contract had been extended to 2014 after some promising results in the Euro 2012 qualifying campaign.

On 13 May 2012, it was announced that Leekens would coach Club Brugge for a second time, but was fired a few months later after a series of successive defeats.

=== Tunisia ===
On 27 March 2014, Leekens signed a two-year contract with the Tunisian Football Federation to coach the Carthage Eagles. For his first tournament with Tunisia, Georges Leekens managed to take the team to the quarter-finals, but his team was eliminated 2–1 by Equatorial Guinea, the host country of the 2015 Africa Cup of Nations. On 27 June 2015, the Tunisian federation announced having terminated its contract amicably.

=== Return to Algeria ===
In 2016, he coached the Algerian national football team and led the team to the 2017 Africa Cup of Nations in Gabon. On 24 January 2017, he resigned as a coach after being eliminated in the Group B stage.

In February 2017, he was one of several managers on the vacant Rwanda national team manager role shortlist.

=== Hungary ===
It was announced in October 2017 that Leekens would coach the Hungary national team. After three losses and one draw in four matches, he was fired in June 2018.

=== Experience with African and Asian clubs ===
He was appointed by Tunisian club Étoile du Sahel as coach on 10 October 2018, after failing in the 2018 CAF Champions League, to be his first experience with African clubs after a long period in European clubs and a short experience in Asian clubs with Al Hilal. He managed to qualify the team for the quarter-finals of the Arab Championship with African champions Wydad Casablanca before leaving on 26 November due to unconvincing results in the Tunisian League.

After less than two months in January 2019, Leekens contracted with Tractor of Iran, but his coaching period did not last long, as the contract was rescinded in May 2019.

In May 2020, nearly a year after his last coaching experience, Leekens announced his retirement to devote himself to his affairs.

== Personal life ==
Georges Leekens is the cousin of Louis Leekens, who was the Belgian National Champion of gymnastics in 1966 and is leading the top sports school for gymnastics in Genk.

== Managerial statistics ==
=== Managerial record ===
As of 16 May 2019

Managerial record by team and tenure
| Team | From | To | Record | | | | |
| Team | From | To | G | W | D | L | Win % |
|---|---|---|---|---|---|---|---|
| (Belgium) Cercle Brugge | 1 July 1984 | 30 June 1987 | 128 | 45 | 37 | 46 | 35.16 |
| (Belgium) Anderlecht | 1 July 1987 | 24 February 1988 | 51 | 31 | 11 | 9 | 60.78 |
| (Belgium) Kortrijk | 1 July 1988 | 30 June 1989 | 37 | 11 | 17 | 9 | 29.73 |
| (Belgium) Club Brugge | 1 July 1989 | 30 June 1991 | 79 | 46 | 22 | 11 | 58.23 |
| (Belgium) KV Mechelen | 1 July 1991 | 30 June 1992 | 36 | 15 | 14 | 7 | 41.67 |
| (Turkey) Trabzonspor | 1 July 1992 | 24 September 1993 | 45 | 24 | 14 | 7 | 53.33 |
| (Belgium) Cercle Brugge | 1 November 1993 | 30 June 1994 | 21 | 7 | 7 | 7 | 33.33 |
| (Belgium) Charleroi | 1 July 1994 | 30 June 1995 | 37 | 12 | 11 | 14 | 32.43 |
| (Belgium) Excelsior Mouscron | 1 July 1995 | 23 January 1997 | 36 | 17 | 10 | 9 | 47.22 |
| Belgium | 21 January 1997 | 20 August 1999 | 28 | 10 | 10 | 8 | 35.71 |
| (Belgium) Lokeren | 29 August 1999 | 30 June 2001 | 98 | 43 | 28 | 27 | 43.88 |
| (Netherlands) Roda JC | 19 September 2001 | 30 June 2002 | 36 | 14 | 7 | 15 | 38.89 |
| Algeria | 1 February 2002 | 7 July 2003 | 6 | 2 | 1 | 3 | 33.33 |
| (Belgium) Excelsior Mouscron | 8 July 2003 | 18 May 2004 | 34 | 15 | 14 | 5 | 44.12 |
| (Belgium) Gent | 18 May 2004 | 30 June 2007 | 105 | 55 | 20 | 30 | 52.38 |
| (Belgium) Lokeren | 1 July 2007 | 30 March 2009 | 68 | 22 | 27 | 19 | 32.35 |
| (Saudi Arabia) Al-Hilal | 1 April 2009 | 3 May 2009 | 5 | 4 | 0 | 1 | 80.00 |
| (Belgium) Kortrijk | 28 May 2009 | 11 May 2010 | 44 | 29 | 12 | 3 | 65.91 |
| Belgium | 11 May 2010 | 13 May 2012 | 19 | 8 | 7 | 4 | 42.11 |
| (Belgium) Club Brugge | 13 May 2012 | 4 November 2012 | 22 | 10 | 5 | 7 | 45.45 |
| Tunisia | 27 March 2014 | 26 June 2015 | 19 | 7 | 8 | 4 | 36.84 |
| (Belgium) Lokeren | 25 October 2015 | 26 October 2016 | 38 | 12 | 11 | 15 | 31.58 |
| Algeria | 27 October 2016 | 24 January 2017 | 6 | 2 | 2 | 2 | 33.33 |
| Hungary | 30 October 2017 | 18 June 2018 | 4 | 0 | 1 | 3 | 0.00 |
| (Tunisia) Étoile du Sahel | 10 October 2018 | 26 November 2018 | 7 | 3 | 4 | 0 | 42.86 |
| (Iran) Tractor | 13 January 2019 | 24 May 2019 | 15 | 7 | 5 | 3 | 46.67 |
| Total | | | 1,024 | 451 | 305 | 268 | 44.04 |

== Honours ==
=== As player ===
Club Brugge

- Belgian First Division: 1972–73, 1975–76, 1976–77, 1977–78, 1979–80
- Belgian Cup: 1976–77; 1978–79 (finalists)
- Belgian Super Cup: 1980
- UEFA Cup: 1975–76 (finalists)
- European Champion Clubs' Cup: 1977–78 (finalists)
- Jules Pappaert Cup: 1972, 1978
- Bruges Matins: 1979, 1981
- Japan Cup Kirin World Soccer: 1981

=== As manager ===
Anderlecht

- Belgian Super Cup: 1987

Club Brugge

- Belgian First Division: 1989–90
- Belgian Cup: 1990–91
- Belgian Super Cup: 1990
- Amsterdam Tournament: 1990

Cercle Brugge

- Belgian Cup: 1985

Belgium

- Kirin Cup: 1999

=== Individual ===
- Belgian Professional Manager of the Year: 1989–90

== See also ==
- List of football managers with the most matches
