= Christophe Grégoire =

Belgian footballer

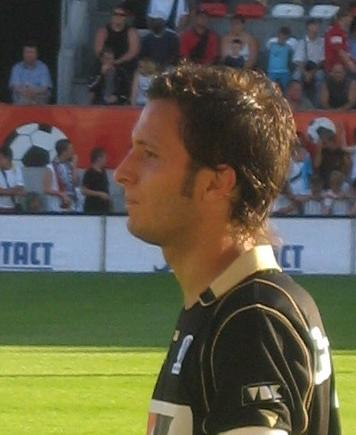
- Grégoire with Gent in August 2007

Personal information
- Date of birth: 20 April 1980 (age 46)
- Place of birth: Liège, Belgium
- Height: 1.86 m (6 ft 1 in)
- Position: Midfielder

Youth career
- 1985–1996: Seraing
- 1996–1998: Royal Liège

Senior career*
Years	Team	Apps	(Gls)
1998–2000	Royal Liège	36	(8)
2000–2004	Mouscron	117	(15)
2004–2005	Anderlecht	6	(1)
2005–2008	Gent	76	(17)
2008–2010	Willem II	45	(5)
2008–2009	→ Charleroi (loan)	14	(3)
2011	Charleroi	9	(0)
2011–2014	RFCB Sprimont		

International career
2002	Belgium U21	4	(0)
2007	Belgium	2	(0)

Managerial career
- 2014–2016: RFCB Sprimont
- 2016–2019: Seraing
- 2021: Virton
- * Club domestic league appearances and goals

Christophe Grégoire (born 20 April 1980) is a Belgian former professional football player and manager, most recently in charge of Virton.

== Coaching career ==
After playing for RFCB Sprimont from 2011 to 2014, he retired and became the manager of the club. He was in charge until November 2016, where he was appointed manager of RFC Seraing. After a streak without any victories, Grégoire was fired on 8 December 2019.
