= Björn Vleminckx =

Belgian footballer

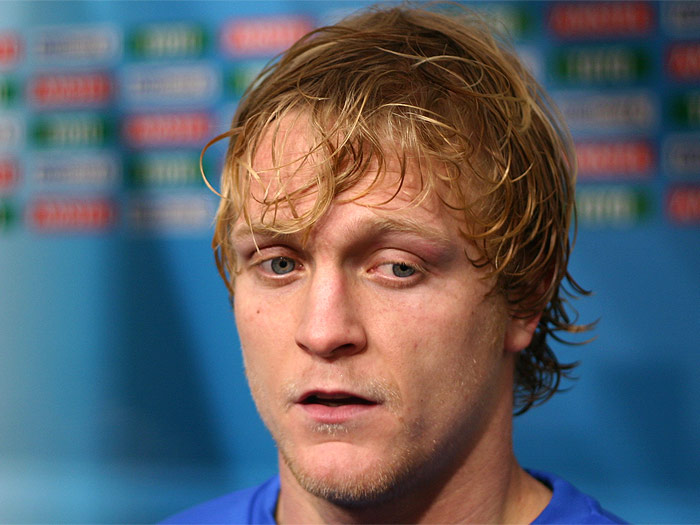

Personal information
- Date of birth: 1 December 1985 (age 40)
- Place of birth: Boom, Belgium
- Height: 1.83 m (6 ft 0 in)
- Position: Forward

Youth career
- 1998–2000: Kallo
- 2000–2002: Beveren

Senior career*
Years	Team	Apps	(Gls)
2002–2006	Beveren	40	(3)
2005–2006	→ Oostende (loan)	30	(8)
2006–2009	Mechelen	93	(37)
2009–2011	NEC Nijmegen	64	(31)
2011–2013	Club Brugge	53	(9)
2013	→ Gençlerbirliği (loan)	16	(9)
2013–2015	Kayseri Erciyesspor	43	(7)
2015–2016	Göztepe	25	(4)
2016–2019	Antwerp	18	(5)
2019–2021	FC Oppuurs		
Total		382	(113)

International career
2004	Belgium U19	8	(1)
2004	Belgium U21	1	(0)
2010–2011	Belgium	3	(0)
- * Club domestic league appearances and goals

Björn Vleminckx (Dutch pronunciation: [ˈbjʏr(ə)ɱ ˈvleːmɪŋks]; born 1 December 1985) is a Belgian former professional footballer who played as a forward.

== Career ==
Born in Boom, Antwerp, Vleminckx began his career with Beveren and joined in July 2005 Oostende on loan. In summer 2006 he signed with KV Mechelen.

In June 2009, he signed a four-year contract until July 2013 with NEC Nijmegen who paid a transfer of €1.8 million to Mechelen for the 23-year-old striker. At NEC he became the top goalscorer in the Eredivisie during the 2010–11 season, with 23 goals.

In March 2011, Vleminckx signed a contract starting from June 2011 at Club Brugge. Brugge paid €3.3 million to NEC as transfer sum.

In January 2013, Vleminckx signed a loan contract until end of season 2012–2013 at Gençlerbirliği. In his first match with the club, he had a successful debut in scoring four goals in a 5–3 win against Antalyaspor.

In June 2013, he signed a two-year contract with Kayseri Erciyesspor.

In August 2016, he agreed to the termination of his contract with Göztepe.

In August 2016, Vleminckx moved to the Belgian Second Division team Antwerp agreeing a two-year contract. A year later, after the club had reached promotion to the Belgian First Division A, it was announced he was no longer part of the club's plans and that he would be allowed to train with the first team.

He trained with the reserve team of Antwerp in nearly two years but however decided to stay at the club until his contract ran out in July 2019. Already in February 2019 it was confirmed, that Vleminckx would join FC Oppuurs ahead of the 2019/20 season. The transfer was also confirmed by Vleminckx himself on 29 May 2019.

== Career statistics ==
=== Club ===
Appearances and goals by club, season and competition
Club	Season	League		Cup (Note: Includes KNVB Cup)		Europe (Note: Counts for appearances and goals at the UEFA Champions League, UEFA Europa League, UEFA Cup, UEFA Supercup and UEFA Intertoto Cup. Including qualifying games.)		Other (Note: Includes Belgian First Division A and Eredivisie playoffs.)		Total	
Club	Season	Apps	Goals	Apps	Goals	Apps	Goals	Apps	Goals	Apps	Goals
Beveren	2002–03	2	0	0	0	–		–		2	0
Beveren	2003–04	18	3	0	0	–		–		18	3
Beveren	2004–05	20	0	0	0	6	1	–		26	1
Beveren	Total	40	3	0	0	6	1	0	0	46	4
Oostende (loan)	2005–06	30	8	0	0	–		–		30	8
Mechelen	2006–07	32	16	0	0	–		–		32	16
Mechelen	2007–08	31	9	0	0	–		–		31	9
Mechelen	2008–09	30	12	7	6	–		–		37	18
Mechelen	Total	93	37	7	6	0	0	0	0	100	43
NEC Nijmegen	2009–10	32	8	4	3	–		–		36	11
NEC Nijmegen	2010–11	32	23	1	1	–		–		33	24
NEC Nijmegen	Total	64	31	5	4	0	0	0	0	69	35
Club Brugge	2011–12	23	6	2	2	8	2	5	0	38	10
Club Brugge	2012–13	10	3	2	1	3	1	0	0	15	5
Club Brugge	Total	33	9	4	3	11	3	5	0	53	15
Gençlerbirliği	2012–13	16	9	0	0	0	0	–		16	9
Kayseri Erciyesspor	2013–14	22	4	0	0	0	0	–		22	4
Kayseri Erciyesspor	2014–15	21	3	1	0	0	0	–		22	3
Kayseri Erciyesspor	Total	43	7	1	0	0	0	0	0	44	7
Göztepe	2015–16	25	4	1	0	0	0	–		26	4
Antwerp	2016–17	18	6	1	0	0	0	0	0	18	6
Career total		362	114	19	13	17	4	5	0	403	131

== Honours ==
Individual

- Eredivisie top scorer: 2010–11
- Best sportsman of Nijmegen 2011
