= Philippe Saint-Jean =

Belgian footballer

Personal information
- Date of birth: 13 May 1954 (age 72)
- Place of birth: Braine-l'Alleud, Belgium

Senior career*
Years	Team	Apps	(Gls)
1970–1980	Braine		

Managerial career
- 1979–1980: Braine (youth)
- 1983–1985: Union SG (youth)
- 1987–1993: Braine
- 1993–1994: Union SG (dir. of sports)
- 1994–1995: Mechelen (youth)
- 1995–1997: Belgium U-21
- 1997–2002: Mouscron (head developer)
- 2002–2004: Tubize
- 2004–2005: Mouscron
- 2006–2008: Tubize
- 2008: Mons
- 2010–2012: Excel Mouscron
- 2012–2015: Tubize (technical director)
- * Club domestic league appearances and goals

Philippe Saint-Jean (born 13 May 1954) is a Belgian football manager.
