= Honour Gombami =

Zimbabwean footballer (born 1983)

Personal information
- Date of birth: 9 January 1983 (age 43)
- Place of birth: Gwanda, Zimbabwe
- Height: 1.75 m (5 ft 9 in)
- Position: Second striker

Youth career
- Bosso Juniors

Senior career*
Years	Team	Apps	(Gls)
2002–2007	Highlanders		
2007–2012	Cercle Brugge	93	(16)
2012–2013	Antwerp	14	(1)
2013–2016	Izegem	80	(4)

International career^{‡}
2004–	Zimbabwe	18	(3)
- * Club domestic league appearances and goals as of 3 October 2016 ‡ National team caps and goals as of 3 August 2007

Honour Gombami (born 9 January 1983) is a Zimbabwean former professional football player. He is a member of the Zimbabwe national football team.

Cercle's new head coach De Boeck was quite immediately impressed by Gombami's skills. He even stated that in the future he saw Gombami playing for Anderlecht, De Boeck's former team and Belgium's most notable top team. Rumours were going that Anderlecht had approached Gombami for a transfer in May 2008. However, Anderlecht manager Herman Van Holsbeeck denied this.

Gombami lives together with his teammate Vuza Nyoni in an apartment in Bruges. They both recommended Obadiah Tarumbwa to the Cercle management.

In December 2010, Gombami was severely injured in a match against RC Genk. It took 15 months for Gombami to make his comeback. In the summer of 2012, Gombami signed for Belgian Second Division team Antwerp. He then played three years for Izegem, and retired in 2016.
