= Royal Excelsior Mouscron =

Mouscron
- Full name: Royal Excelsior Mouscron
- Nicknames: Les Hurlus, Les Frontaliers
- Founded: 1922 (Stade Mouscron, ARA Mouscron); 1 July 1964 (merge and registration)
- Dissolved: 28 December 2009
- Ground: Stade Le Canonnier
- Capacity: 10,571
- Website: www.excelsior.be
Home colours	Away colours

Royal Excelsior Mouscron was a Belgian football club from the municipality of Mouscron, Hainaut. In December 2009 they were declared bankrupt and soon ceased to exist. A new club known as Royal Excel Mouscron was formed in March 2010 and placed in the Belgian Third Division.

== History ==
The club was the result of the merger between Stade Mouscron and A.R.A. Mouscron in 1964.

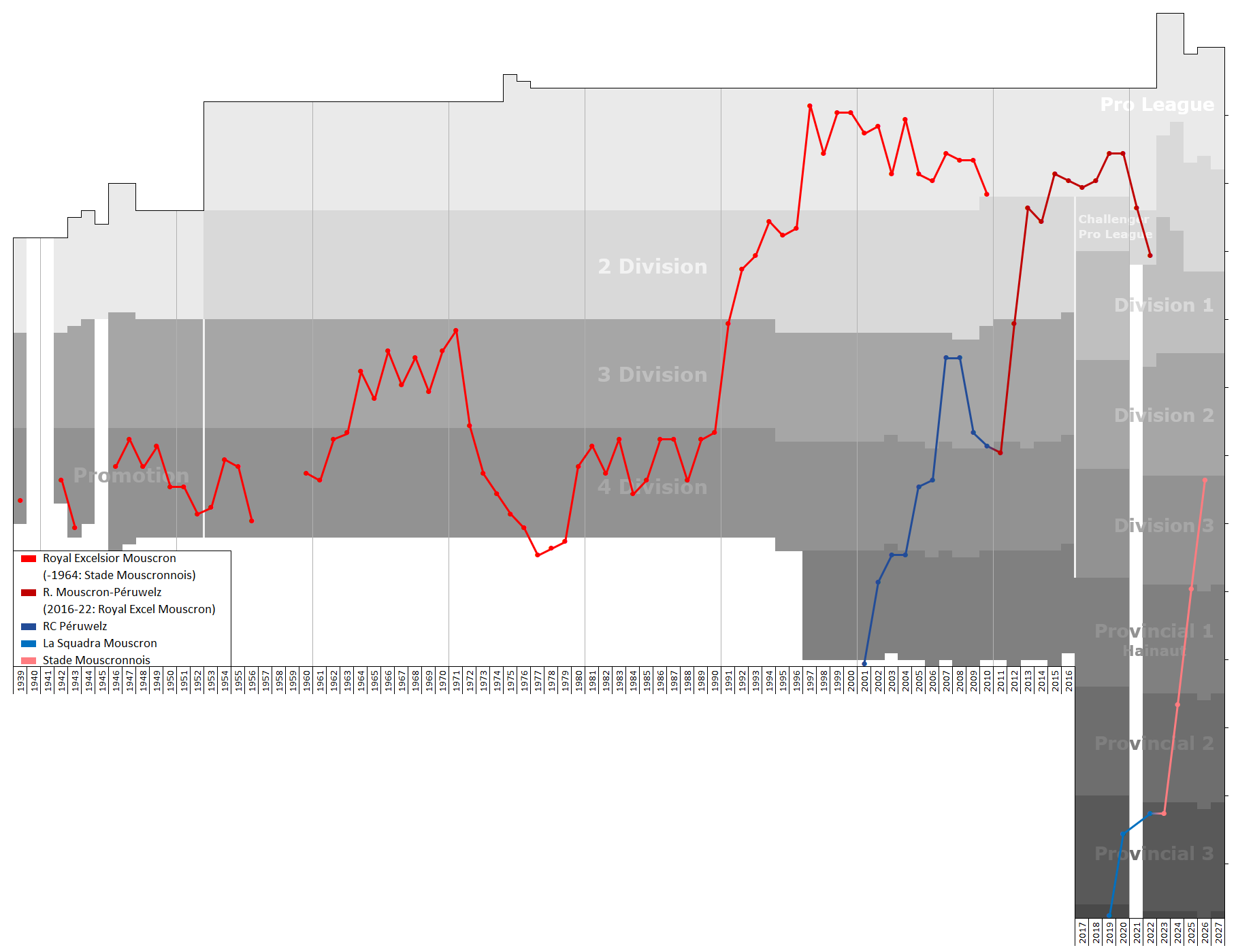
Historical chart of league performance of Excelsior Mouscron, its predecessors and successors

R.E. Mouscron had financial problems during the 2004–05 season and so the president and mayor of Mouscron Jean-Pierre Detremmerie left the club and was replaced by Edward Van Daele. The players with the higher wages were asked to leave the club, as did Marcin Żewłakow, Franky Vandendriessche, Geoffrey Claeys, Koen De Vleeschauwer and Alexandre Teklak.

In late 2009 Manchester City was ready to spend £3million to save R.E. Mouscron from bankruptcy and use them as a feeder club.

On 28 December 2009, Mouscron announced its third forfeit in a row because of enduring financial problems, and was thus, according to Belgian league rules, excluded from competition, with all its previous results in the ongoing competition being scrapped. The club in its current form ceased to exist, with all its players (and staff) becoming free agents.

In March 2010 a successor club was formed with the merging of the bankrupt R.E. Mouscron and R.R.C. Peruwelz. The new club was known as Royal Mouscron-Péruwelz until they later declared bankruptcy in May 2022.

== Honours ==
- Belgian Second Division:
  - Runners-up (1): 1993–94
- Belgian Second Division final round:
  - Winners (1): 1996
- Belgian Cup:
  - Runners-up (2): 2001–02, 2005–06

== European record ==
As of December 2008.

Competition	Apps	Pld	W	D	L	GF	GA
UEFA Cup	2	8	2	3	3	11	15

Season	Competition	Round	Nat.	Club	Home	Away
1997–98	UEFA Cup	2QR	(Cyprus)	Apollon Limassol	3–0	0–0
		1R	(France)	Metz	0–2	1–4
2002–03	UEFA Cup	QR	(Iceland)	Fylkir	3–1	1–1
		1R	(Czech Republic)	Slavia Prague	2–2	1–5

== Former coaches ==
- 1990–1995 : André Van Maldeghem
- 1995–1996 : Georges Leekens
- 1996–1997 : Georges Leekens, Gil Vandenbrouck
- 1997–2002 : Hugo Broos
- 2002–2003 : Lorenzo Staelens
- 2003–2004 : Georges Leekens
- 2004–2005 : Philippe Saint-Jean, Geert Broeckaert
- 2005–2006 : Geert Broeckaert, Paul Put, Gil Vandenbrouck
- 2006–2007 : Gil Vandenbrouck
- 2007–12/2008 : Marc Brys
- 12/2007-06/2009: Enzo Scifo
