= Yannis =

Yannis, Yanis, Yiannis, or Giannis (/ˈjɑːnɪs/ YAHN-is; Greek: Γιάννης pronounced [ˈʝanis]) is a common Greek given name, a variant of John (Hebrew) meaning "God is gracious." In formal Greek (e.g. all government documents and birth certificates) the name exists only as Ioannis (Ιωάννης). Variants include Yannis (Also Janni), Iannis, Yannakis, Yanis, and the rare Yannos, usually found in the Peloponnese and Cyprus.

Feminine forms are Γιάννα (Yianna, Gianna) and Ιωάννα (Ioanna) which is the formal variant used in formal/government documents.

Yannis may refer to:

- Ioannis Amanatidis, Greek footballer
- Yannis Anastasiou, Greek footballer
- Yiannis Andrianopoulos, Greek footballer
- Giannis Antetokounmpo, Greek-Nigerian basketball player
- Giannis Antoniou, Cypriot judoka
- Giannis Apostolidis, Greek footballer
- Yiannis Arabatzis, Greek goalkeeper
- Yannis Bakos, economist
- Ioannis Banias (1939–2012), Greek politician
- Yannis Behrakis, Greek photojournalist
- Giannis Bezos, Greek actor and director
- Yiannis Bourousis, Greek basketball player
- Yannis Brown, composer
- Yiannis Carras, Greek shipping magnate
- Giannis Chondrogiannis, Greek politician
- Jani Christou, Greek composer
- Giannis Chrysafis, Greek footballer
- Ioannis Damanakis, Greek footballer
- Giannis Dragasakis, Greek politician
- Yiannis Dritsas, the inventor of Greek instant frappé
- Yiannis Eitziridis, Greek musician
- Giannis Fysekis, Greek footballer
- Giannis Gagaloudis, Greek basketball player
- Giannis Galitsios, Greek footballer
- Giannis Georgallis, Greek basketball player
- Giannis Giannoulis, Greek-Canadian basketball player
- Giannis Gionakis, Greek actor
- Yannis Goumas, Greek footballer
- Ioannis Gounaris, Greek footballer
- Yiannis Grivas, Greek judge
- Ioannis Hatzidakis, Greek mathematician
- Yannis Hotzeas, Greek communist thinker
- Yanni (Yiánnis Hryssomállis), Greek composer, keyboardist
- Giannis Iliopoulos, Greek basketball player
- Giannis Ioannidis, Greek basketball coach and politician
- Giannis Kalambokis, Greek basketball player
- Ioannis Kalitzakis, Greek footballer
- Giannis Katemis, Greek footballer
- Yannis Kondos, Greek poet
- Yannis Kontos, Greek photojournalist
- Yiannis Koskiniatis, Greek footballer
- Yiannis Kouros, Greek ultramarathon runner
- Ioannis Kyrastas, Greek footballer and football manager
- Giannis Kyriakopoulos, Greek basketball player
- Yiannis Latsis, Greek shipping tycoon
- Giannis Liourdis, Greek footballer
- Yannis Makriyannis, Greek General
- Yannis Manakis, Greek photographer
- Giannis Maniatis, Greek footballer
- Yannis Margaritis, Greek theater director
- Giannis Markopoulos, Greek composer
- Giannis Mihalopoulos, Greek actor
- Giannis Milonas, Greek basketball player
- Yiannis Moralis, Greek artist
- Yiannis N. Moschovakis, Greek theorist
- Yiannis Okkas, Cypriot footballer
- Yiannis Papadopoulos, Greek footballer
- Yiannis Papaioannou, Greek composer
- Yannis Papathanasiou, Greek politician
- Yannis Pappas, Greek-American Comedian and Podcaster. Best-selling books include “Maurica’s Foggy Bottom: A Witch Hazel Journey”, “Chrissy and Me: A Guide To Ordering For The Table”, and “I’m It, You’re It, Das It!”
- Yiannis Parios, Greek singer
- Giannis Pasas, Greek footballer
- Yiannis Patilis, Greek poet
- Yannis Pathiakakis Stadium, Greek stadium
- Yiannis Pharmakis, Greek leader
- Yannis Philippakis, Guitarist and lead singer of Foals
- Giannis Ploutarhos, Greek singer
- Yiannis Poulakas, Greek painter and stage designer
- Giannis Poulopoulos, Greek singer
- Yannis Psycharis, Greek author and philologist
- Yiannis Psychopedis, Greek art movement
- Yiannis Ritsos, Greek poet
- Yanis da Rocha, Portuguese footballer
- Ioannis Samaras, Greek footballer
- Giannis Sampson, Cypriot footballer
- Yannis K. Semertzidis, Greek physicist
- Giannis Sfakianakis, Greek footballer
- Giannis Sioutis, Greek basketball player
- Yiannis Skarimbas, Greek writer
- Giannis Skopelitis, Greek footballer
- Yannis Smaragdis, Greek film director
- Giannis Sotirhos, Greek footballer
- Yiannis Spyropoulos, Greek painter
- Yannis Stavrou, Greek painter
- Yannis Tamtakos, Greek political activist
- Giannis Taralidis, Greek footballer
- Yianis Tomaras, Greek footballer
- Yiannis Tridimas, Greek long-distance runner
- Yannis Tsarouchis, Greek painter
- Giannis Valaoras, Greek footballer
- Giannis Valinakis, Greek politician
- Giannis Vardinogiannis, Greek businessman
- Yanis Varoufakis, Greek economist
- Yannis Varveris, Greek poet
- Giannis Vogiatzis, Greek actor
- Iannis Xenakis, Greek composer
- Yiannis Xipolitas, Cypriot footballer
- Yannis Xirotiris, Greek educator
- Yannis Yfantis, Greek writer and poet
- Giannis Zapropoulos, Greek footballer
- Giannis Zaradoukas, Greek footballer
- Yanis C. Yortsos, current dean of the Viterbi School of Engineering at the University of Southern California
- Yanis Kanidis (1930–2004), a Greek-Russian physical education teacher
- Yanis Papassarantis (born 1988), a Belgian football player of Greek origin
- Yanis Smits, a Latvian theologian active against the Soviet rule over Latvia during 1956–1976

== See also ==
- Alternate forms for the name John
- Janis (disambiguation)
