= Hanns =

Hanns is a male given name. Notable people with the name include:

- Hanns Blaschke (1896–1971), Austrian politician
- Hanns Bolz (1885–1918), German expressionist and cubist painter
- Hanns Brandstätter (born 1949), Austrian fencer
- Hanns Braun (1886–1918), German athlete
- Hanns Cibulka (1920–2004), German Bohemian poet and diarist
- Hanns Eckelkamp (1927–2021), German film producer and founder of Atlas Filmverleih
- Hanns Eisler (1898–1962), Austrian composer
- Hanns Heinz Ewers (1871–1943), German actor, poet, philosopher, and writer of short stories and novels
- Hanns Wolf (1894–1968), German composer and conductor
- Hanns Joachim Friedrichs (1927–1995), German journalist
- Hanns In der Gand, pen name of Ladislaus Krupski (1882–1947), Swiss folklorist and collector of traditional and military songs
- Hanns Bruno Geinitz (1814–1900), German geologist, born at Altenburg, the capital of Saxe-Altenburg
- Hanns Georgi (1901–1989), German painter, printmaker and book illustrator
- Hanns Goebl (1901–1986), Bavarian sculptor who worked for the Nymphenburg Porcelain Factory
- Hanns Grössel (1932–2012), German literary translator and broadcasting journalist
- Hanns Günther, pseudonym of Walter de Haas (1886–1969), a prolific German author, translator, and editor of popular science books
- Hanns Heise (1913–1992), Oberstleutnant in the Luftwaffe during World War II
- Hanns Hopp (1890–1971), German architect
- Hanns Hörbiger (1860–1931), Austrian engineer from Vienna with roots in Tyrol
- Hanns Dieter Hüsch (1925–2005), German author, cabaret artist, actor, songwriter and radio commentator
- Hanns Jana (born 1952), German fencer
- Hanns Jelinek (1901–1969), Austrian composer of Czech descent who is also known under the pseudonym Hanns Elin
- Hanns Johst (1890–1978), German playwright and Nazi Poet Laureate
- Hanns Kerrl (1887–1941), German Nazi politician
- Hanns Kilian (1905–1981), German bobsledder who competed from the late 1920s to the late 1930s
- Hanns Kräly (1884–1950), credited in the United States as Hans Kraly, was a German actor and screenwriter
- Hanns Kreisel (1931–2017), German mycologist and professor emeritus
- Hanns Laengenfelder (1903–1982), Generalmajor in the Wehrmacht during World War II
- Hanns Lilje (1899–1977), German Lutheran bishop and one of the pioneers of the ecumenical movement
- Hanns Lippmann (1890–1929), German film producer of the silent era
- Hanns Lothar (1929–1967), German film actor
- Hanns Ludin (1905–1947), German Nazi diplomat executed for war crimes
- Hanns Maaßen (1908–1983), German journalist and writer
- Hanns Malissa (1920–2010), Austrian analytical chemist and environmental chemist
- Hanns von Meyenburg (1887–1971), Swiss pathologist
- Hanns Nägle (1902–?), German bobsledder who competed in the late 1920s
- Hanns Albin Rauter (1895–1949), high-ranking Austrian-born Nazi war criminal
- Hanns Sachs (1881–1947), one of the earliest psychoanalysts, and a close personal friend of Sigmund Freud
- Hanns Scharff (1907–1992), German Luftwaffe interrogator during the Second World War
- Hanns Martin Schleyer (1915–1977), German business executive and employer and industry representative
- Hanns Schwarz (1888–1945), Austrian film director
- Hanns Seidel (1901–1961), German politician and Bavarian prime minister from 1957 to 1960
- Hanns Egon Wörlen (1915–2014), German architect and art patron
- Hanns Zischler (born 1947), German actor most famous in America for his portrayal of Hans in Steven Spielberg's film Munich

== See also ==
- Hanns-Peter Boehm (1928–2022), German chemist
- Hanns-Christian Kaiser (born 1969), German artist
- Hanns-Heinrich Lohmann (1911–1995), World War II Waffen SS officer
- Hanns-Horst von Necker (1903–1979), Generalmajor in the Luftwaffe during World War II
- Hanns-Josef Ortheil (born 1951), German author, scholar of German literature and pianist
- Hanns-Joachim-Friedrichs-Award, German award for journalism
- Hann (disambiguation)
- Hannes
- Hannus
- Hans (disambiguation)
- Iohannis
- Johannes
- Johannis (disambiguation)
- Ohannes
