= Joannis =

Joannis is a given name. Notable people with the name include:

- Joannis Andreou, Greek swimmer
- Joannis Antonius de Sancto Giorgio, Italian jurist
- Joannis Avramidis, Greek-Austrian sculptor
- Joannis Capodistrias, Greek politician in Russia
- Joannis de Segovia, Spanish theologian
- Joannis Eschuid, English astrologer
- Joannis Melissanidis, Greek artistic gymnast
- Joannis Metaxas, Greek politician
- Joannis Phrangoudis, Greek Army officer
- Joannis Romberch de Kyrspe, Westphalia
- Joannis Vislicensis, medieval author
- Joanni Perronet, French fencer
- Andreas Eudaemon-Joannis, Greek Jesuit and philosopher
- Giovanni Giorgi (composer) (Joannis de Georgiis), Italian composer and priest
- Giovanni Maria Alemanni, Italian composer and lutenist
- Jan Weenix, Dutch painter
- Jan z Lublina, Polish composer and organist
- Jens Nilssøn (Joannis Nicolai), Bishop of Oslo
- Johann Hedwig, German botanist
- John Martyn (botanist), English botanist

as a surname

- Joseph de Joannis (1864–1932), French clergyman and amateur entomologist

== See also ==
- Johannis (disambiguation)
- Iohannis
- Ioannis
- Alternate forms for the name John
