= 2006–07 Standard Liège season =

Standard Liège
2006–07 season
- Manager: Johan Boskamp; Michel Preud'homme
- First Division: 3rd
- Champions League: Final Qualifying Round
- Belgian Cup: Final
- UEFA Cup: Final Qualifying Round
- Top goalscorer: Milan Jovanović (14)

Standard Liège did not manage to win a trophy in the 2006–07 season, falling short to Club Brugge in the domestic cup final, and finishing some way behind champions Anderlecht in the domestic league. The main disappointment was failing to qualify for either the UEFA Champions League or the UEFA Cup group stages, which saw Johan Boskamp being sacked already on 30 August. He was then replaced by legendary goalkeeper Michel Preud'homme for the remainder of the season.

== Squad ==
=== Goalkeepers ===
- (Belgium) Olivier Renard
- (Belgium) Jérémy De Vriendt
- (Venezuela) Rorys Aragón

=== Defenders ===
- (Portugal) Rogério Matias
- (Belgium) Philippe Léonard
- (Portugal) Nuno Coelho
- (Senegal) Mohamed Sarr
- (Belgium) Frédéric Dupré
- (United States) Oguchi Onyewu
- (Belgium) Eric Deflandre
- (Brazil) Fred
- (Brazil) (Italy) Marcos Camozzato
- (Brazil) Felipe
- (Brazil) Dante

=== Midfielders ===
- (Croatia) Milan Rapaić
- (Belgium) Karel Geraerts
- (Belgium) Axel Witsel
- (Portugal) Sérgio Conceição
- (Belgium) Steven Defour
- (Belgium) Gabriel N'Galula
- (France) Siramana Dembélé
- (Belgium) Marouane Fellaini
- (Belgium) Mustapha Oussalah
- (Belgium) Yanis Papassarantis

=== Attackers ===
- (Serbia) Milan Jovanović
- (Democratic Republic of the Congo) (France) Ali Lukunku
- (Portugal) Ricardo Sá Pinto
- (Brazil) Igor de Camargo

== First Division ==
=== Matches ===
1	Lokeren	2–1	Standard Liège
	Kovalenko 14' (o.g.); Overmeire 43'		Geraerts 27'

2	Standard Liège	1–2	Charleroi
	Geraerts 9'		Smolders 1'; Théréau 67'

3	Genk	1–1	Standard Liège
	Bošnjak 30'		Jovanović 31'

4	Standard Liège	1–1	Zulte Waregem
	Jovanović 85' (pen.)		Sergeant 67'

5	Lierse	1–3	Standard Liège
	Andić 49'		Geraerts 4'; Sá Pinto 7'; Kovalenko 47'

6	Standard Liège	2–1	Brussels
	Rapaić 9'; Conceição 49'		Petö 12'

7	Standard Liège	1–0	Cercle Brugge
	Geraerts 44'

8	Gent	2–1	Standard Liège
	Foley 34'; Pavlović 81'		Rapaić 54'

9	Standard Liège	2–1	Roeselare
	Jovanović 75'; Dupré 85'		De Vleeschauwer 21'

10	Beveren	0–3	Standard Liège
			Conceição 28'; Defour 69'; Jovanović 75'

11	Standard Liège	0–0	Anderlecht

12	Mons	2–3	Standard Liège
	Cordaro 55'; Zoko 75'		Geraerts 28', 66'; Jovanović 38'

13	Standard Liège	1–2	Sint-Truiden
	Lopes 74'		Van Houdt 76', 82'

14	Germinal Beerschot	1–3	Standard Liège
	González 51'		De Camargo 8', 60'; Sá Pinto 74'

15	Standard Liège	3–0	Westerlo
	Defour 2'; Jovanović 44'; De Camargo 64'

16	Club Brugge	4–4	Standard Liège
	Balaban 4', 13'; Van Heerden 53'; Salou 64'		De Camargo 58'; Fellaini 69'; Onyewu 83'; Lukunku 89'

17	Standard Liège	2–0	Mouscron
	Jovanović 65', 81'

18	Standard Liège	3–1	Lokeren

19	Charleroi	2–5	Standard Liège
	Perbet 23', 29'		Jovanović 12'; Conceição 37'; Defays 54' (o.g.); De Camargo 68'; Geraerts 75'

20	Standard Liège	2–1	Genk
	Jovanović 29'; De Camargo 49'		Hasoun 61'

21	Zulte Waregem	3–1	Standard Liège
	Matthys 58' (pen.); De Brul 64'; Van Niewenhuyzen 89'		Defour 87'

22	Standard Liège	3–2	Lierse
	Jovanović 30' (pen.); Fellaini 49'; Dupré 90' (pen.)		Snelders 84', 85'

23	Brussels	0–3	Standard Liège
			Lukunku 17', 41'; Conceição 71' (pen.)

24	Cercle Brugge	0–2	Standard Liège
			Lukunku 59', 83'

25	Standard Liège	0–1	Gent
			Stoica 47'

26	Roeselare	2–3	Standard Liège
	Oyen 82', 83'		Witsel 35'; Jovanović 50'; Rapaić 66'

27	Standard Liège	0–0	Beveren

28	Anderlecht	1–0	Standard Liège
	Tchité 19'

29	Standard Liège	1–0	Mons
	De Camargo 44'

30	Sint-Truiden	0–3	Standard Liège
			Fellaini 44'; Witsel 48'; Lukunku 90'

31	Standard Liège	2–2	Germinal Beerschot
	Jovanović 12'; De Roeck 84' (o.g.)		Cruz 35'; Roelandts 59'

32	Westerlo	1–1	Standard Liège
	Dekelver 13'		De Camargo 89'

33	Standard Liège	1–0	Club Brugge
	De Camargo 11'

34	Mouscron	2–0	Standard Liège
	Tomou 36'; Ba 44'

== Sources ==
- RSSSF - Belgium 2006/07
