= 2015–16 FC Zenit Saint Petersburg season =

Zenit Saint Petersburg
2015–16 season
- Chairman: Aleksandr Dyukov
- Manager: André Villas-Boas
- Stadium: Petrovsky Stadium
- Russian Premier League: 3rd
- Russian Cup: Winners
- Russian Super Cup: Winners
- UEFA Champions League: Round of 16 v. Benfica
- Top goalscorer: League: Hulk (17); All: Artyom Dzyuba, Hulk (23)
- Highest home attendance: 18,593 vs Krasnodar; 15 August 2015
- Lowest home attendance: 14,880 vs Ural; 21 November 2015
- Average home league attendance: 16,771; 16 April 2016
Home colours	Away colours

The 2015–16 Zenit Saint Petersburg season was the 91st season in the club's history and its 20th consecutive season in the Russian Premier League. The club also participated in the Russian Cup and the UEFA Champions League.

== Squad ==
Note: Flags indicate national team as defined under FIFA eligibility rules; some limited exceptions apply. Players may hold more than one non-FIFA nationality.

No.	Pos.	Nation	Player
1	GK	RUS	Yuri Lodygin
2	DF	RUS	Aleksandr Anyukov
4	DF	ITA	Domenico Criscito
6	DF	BEL	Nicolas Lombaerts
7	FW	BRA	Hulk
8	MF	BRA	Maurício
9	FW	RUS	Aleksandr Kokorin
10	MF	POR	Danny (captain)
13	DF	POR	Luís Neto
14	MF	RUS	Artur Yusupov
16	GK	RUS	Vyacheslav Malafeev
17	MF	RUS	Oleg Shatov

No.	Pos.	Nation	Player
19	DF	RUS	Igor Smolnikov
20	MF	RUS	Viktor Fayzulin
21	MF	ESP	Javi García
22	FW	RUS	Artyom Dzyuba
23	DF	RUS	Yevgeni Chernov
24	DF	ARG	Ezequiel Garay
26	DF	SRB	Vukašin Jovanović
28	MF	BEL	Axel Witsel
41	GK	RUS	Mikhail Kerzhakov
81	MF	RUS	Yuri Zhirkov
90	FW	RUS	Ramil Sheydayev
94	MF	RUS	Aleksey Yevseyev

=== Out on loan ===
Note: Flags indicate national team as defined under FIFA eligibility rules; some limited exceptions apply. Players may hold more than one non-FIFA nationality.

No.	Pos.	Nation	Player
3	DF	ARG	Cristian Ansaldi (at (Italy) Genoa)
5	MF	RUS	Aleksandr Ryazantsev (at (Russia) Ural)
8	MF	RUS	Pavel Mogilevets (at (Russia) Rostov)
11	FW	RUS	Aleksandr Kerzhakov (at (Switzerland) Zürich)

No.	Pos.	Nation	Player
48	FW	RUS	Aleksei Gasilin (at (Germany) Schalke 04)
77	FW	MNE	Luka Đorđević (at (Spain) Ponferradina)
78	DF	RUS	Dmitri Chistyakov (at (Armenia) Mika)

=== Reserve squad ===
Note: Flags indicate national team as defined under FIFA eligibility rules; some limited exceptions apply. Players may hold more than one non-FIFA nationality.

No.	Pos.	Nation	Player
18	MF	RUS	Konstantin Zyryanov
43	FW	RUS	Pavel Nazimov
50	DF	RUS	Maksim Karpov
52	DF	RUS	Andrei Ivanov
55	DF	RUS	Konstantin Lobov
58	DF	RUS	Ilya Zuev
60	MF	RUS	Maksim Palienko
62	DF	RUS	Stepan Rebenko
65	MF	RUS	Danila Yashchuk
68	MF	RUS	Vyacheslav Zinkov
70	FW	RUS	Dmitri Bogayev

No.	Pos.	Nation	Player
71	GK	RUS	Egor Barubin
74	MF	RUS	Sergei Ivanov
75	DF	RUS	Andrei Vasilyev
76	FW	RUS	Pavel Kireyenko
79	MF	RUS	Konstantin Troyanov
80	GK	RUS	Mikhail Mzhelsky
83	GK	RUS	Igor Obukhov
87	DF	RUS	Artyom Vyatkin
88	MF	RUS	Artyom Popov
92	FW	RUS	Pavel Dolgov
95	GK	RUS	Aleksandr Vasyutin

== Transfers ==
=== Summer ===
In: Note: Flags indicate national team as defined under FIFA eligibility rules; some limited exceptions apply. Players may hold more than one non-FIFA nationality.

No.	Pos.	Nation	Player
14	MF	RUS	Artur Yusupov (from (Russia) Dynamo Moscow)
22	FW	RUS	Artyom Dzyuba (from (Russia) Spartak Moscow)
31	MF	RUS	Denis Tkachuk (from (Russia) Krylia Sovetov Samara)
41	GK	RUS	Mikhail Kerzhakov (from (Russia) Anzhi Makhachkala)
42	MF	RUS	Konstantin Kotov
46	MF	RUS	Vitali Gorulyov
49	MF	RUS	Dmitri Pletnyov
56	DF	RUS	Danil Krugovoy
59	DF	RUS	Sergei Bugriyev
60	MF	RUS	Maksim Paliyenko (from (Russia) Krylia Sovetov Samara)
61	MF	RUS	Dmitri Kirillov
69	DF	RUS	Vladislav Nikitin (April 2015)
72	DF	RUS	Stanislav Mareyev (from (Russia) LFK Lokomotiv Moscow)
75	DF	RUS	Andrei Vasilyev (from (Russia) Rostov)
82	MF	RUS	Igor Drykov (free agent, until April 2015 at (Russia) CSKA Moscow)
84	DF	RUS	Feliks Shalimov
85	GK	RUS	Yaroslav Burychenkov (own academy, April 2015)
86	GK	RUS	Sergei Lazarev (own academy, April 2015)
89	FW	RUS	Yevgeni Markov (end of loan at (Russia) Yenisey Krasnoyarsk)
91	FW	RUS	Yegor Denisov
93	GK	RUS	Mikhail Kizeyev
98	FW	RUS	Yevgeni Reutov

Out: Note: Flags indicate national team as defined under FIFA eligibility rules; some limited exceptions apply. Players may hold more than one non-FIFA nationality.

No.	Pos.	Nation	Player
3	DF	ARG	Cristian Ansaldi (on loan to (Italy) Genoa, previously on loan to (Spain) Atlético Madrid)
8	MF	RUS	Pavel Mogilevets (on loan to (Russia) FC Rostov)
10	MF	RUS	Andrei Arshavin (to (Russia) Kuban Krasnodar)
23	FW	VEN	Salomón Rondón (to (England) West Bromwich Albion)
33	DF	SRB	Milan Rodić (to (Russia) Krylia Sovetov Samara)
34	FW	RUS	Maximilian Pronichev (on loan to (Germany) Schalke 04)
39	DF	RUS	Dmitri Skopintsev (to (Germany) RB Leipzig)
40	DF	RUS	Pavel Barbashov
41	DF	RUS	Andrei Yakovlev (to (Czech Republic) Baumit Jablonec)
42	DF	RUS	Danila Davidenko
44	MF	UKR	Anatoliy Tymoshchuk (to (Kazakhstan) Kairat Almaty)
46	MF	RUS	Zakhar Dilanyan (to (Armenia) Ulisses Yerevan)
48	FW	RUS	Aleksei Gasilin (on loan to (Germany) Schalke 04)
56	DF	RUS	Kirill Kostin
57	DF	RUS	Dzhamaldin Khodzhaniyazov (to (Denmark) AGF Aarhus)
59	MF	RUS	Aleksei Yegorov
60	MF	RUS	Yevgeni Serenkov
61	GK	RUS	Anton Tsvetkov (to (Russia) Dynamo Saint Petersburg)
72	DF	RUS	Stepan Zhalobkov
77	FW	MNE	Luka Đorđević (on loan to (Spain) Ponferradina, previously on loan at (Italy) Sampdoria)
78	DF	RUS	Dmitri Chistyakov (on loan to (Armenia) Mika)
82	FW	RUS	Aleksei Makarov
83	GK	RUS	Igor Obukhov (to (Russia) FC Zenit-2 St. Petersburg)
84	DF	RUS	Mikhail Kovalenko (to (Russia) Dynamo Saint Petersburg)
90	FW	RUS	Ramil Sheydayev (on loan to (Russia) Rubin Kazan)
98	FW	RUS	Yevgeni Kozlov (to (Russia) Dynamo Saint Petersburg)
97	MF	RUS	Dmitri Khodakovsky
—	DF	RUS	Yevgeni Alfyorov (released, previously on loan to (Russia) Arsenal Tula)
—	DF	RUS	Denis Terentyev (to (Russia) FC Rostov, previously on loan at (Russia) Tom Tomsk)
—	MF	RUS	Aleksei Kayukov (to (Russia) Dynamo Saint Petersburg, previously on loan to (Russia) Tom-2 Tomsk)

=== Winter ===
In: Note: Flags indicate national team as defined under FIFA eligibility rules; some limited exceptions apply. Players may hold more than one non-FIFA nationality.

No.	Pos.	Nation	Player
8	MF	BRA	Maurício (from (Russia) Terek Grozny)
9	FW	RUS	Aleksandr Kokorin (from (Russia) Dynamo Moscow)
23	DF	RUS	Yevgeni Chernov (from (Russia) Tom Tomsk)
26	DF	SRB	Vukašin Jovanović (from (Serbia) Red Star Belgrade)
30	MF	RUS	Nikita Salamatov (from (Russia) Vityaz Podolsk)
31	GK	RUS	Mikhail Ponomarenko
35	DF	RUS	David Mildzikhov (from (Russia) Baikal Irkutsk)
38	MF	RUS	Leon Musayev
40	MF	RUS	Yuri Bavin (from (Portugal) Leiria)
53	DF	RUS	Mikhail Slashchyov
81	MF	RUS	Yuri Zhirkov (from (Russia) Dynamo Moscow)
82	MF	RUS	Ilya Ivanov
90	FW	RUS	Ramil Sheydayev (end of loan to (Russia) Rubin Kazan)

Out: Note: Flags indicate national team as defined under FIFA eligibility rules; some limited exceptions apply. Players may hold more than one non-FIFA nationality.

No.	Pos.	Nation	Player
5	MF	RUS	Aleksandr Ryazantsev (on loan to (Russia) Ural Sverdlovsk Oblast)
11	FW	RUS	Aleksandr Kerzhakov (on loan to (Switzerland) FC Zürich)
31	MF	RUS	Denis Tkachuk (to (Russia) Rubin Kazan)
53	DF	RUS	Ivan Ivanidi
81	GK	RUS	Andrei Strozhevskiy
82	MF	RUS	Igor Drykov
89	FW	RUS	Yevgeni Markov (to (Russia) Tosno)

== Competitions ==
=== Russian Premier League ===
==== Results by round ====
Round	1	2	3	4	5	6	7	8	9	10	11	12	13	14	15	16	17	18	19	20	21	22	23	24	25	26	27	28	29	30
Ground	A	H	A	A	H	A	H	A	H	A	H	A	H	A	H	A	H	H	A	H	A	H	A	H	A	H	A	H	A	H
Result	W	W	W	W	L	W	L	D	D	D	W	D	W	D	L	W	L	D	D	W	W	W	W	W	L	W	W	W	D	W
Position	2	1	1	1	2	2	3	3	3	3	3	3	3	4	4	4	4	6	5	5	4	4	3	3	5	3	3	3	3	3

Updated to match(es) played on 21 May 2016. Source: Russian Premier League
A = Away; H = Home; W = Win; D = Draw; L = Loss

==== Matches ====
19 July 2015 1	Zenit St. Petersburg	2 – 1	Dynamo Moscow	Saint Petersburg
12:30 MSK (UTC+3)	Neto (yellow card) 20'; Shatov (yellow card) 38', (goal) 67'; Hulk 44' (pen.)	Summary	Hubočan (yellow card) 15' (yellow-red card) 42'; Kokorin 28'; Obolsky (yellow card) 89'	Stadium: Petrovsky Stadium; Attendance: 16,577; Referee: V. Meshkov

26 July 2015 2	Ural	1 – 4	Zenit St. Petersburg	Yekaterinburg
13:30 MSK (UTC+3)	Erokhin (yellow card) 33', (goal) 67'; Fontanello (yellow card) 50'; Yemelyanov (yellow card) 90'	Summary	Dzyuba 20'; Yusupov (yellow card) 40'; Hulk 50' (pen.), 70'; Danny 90+1'	Stadium: SKB-Bank Arena; Attendance: 9,900; Referee: A. Eskov

1 August 2015 3	Zenit St. Petersburg	3 – 0	Terek Grozny	Saint Petersburg
17:00 MSK (UTC+3)	Neto (yellow card) 4'; Smolnikov 7'; Shatov 11'; Danny 90'	Summary	Rodolfo (yellow card) 37'	Stadium: Petrovsky Stadium; Attendance: 17,835; Referee: S. Ivanov

9 August 2015 4	Ufa	0 – 1	Zenit St. Petersburg	Ufa
16:00 MSK (UTC+3)	Frimpong (yellow card) 64'; Marcinho (yellow card) 73'	Summary	Danny 86'	Stadium: Neftyanik Stadium; Attendance: 14,200; Referee: I. Fedotov

15 August 2015 5	Zenit St. Petersburg	0 – 2	Krasnodar	Saint Petersburg
16:30 MSK (UTC+3)	Hulk (yellow card) 90+5'	Summary	Sigurðsson 26', (yellow card) 39'; Laborde 50'; Mamayev (yellow card) 62'; Bystrov (yellow card) 75'; Dikan (yellow card) 87'	Stadium: Petrovsky Stadium; Attendance: 18,593; Referee: V. Moskalev

24 August 2015 6	Rubin Kazan	1 – 3	Zenit St. Petersburg	Kazan
19:00 MSK (UTC+3)	Ozdoev (yellow card) 53'; Kanunnikov (yellow card) 63'; Bilyanetdinov 72'; Kuzmin (yellow card) 81'	Summary	Shatov 16', 84'; García (yellow card) 60'; Hulk 78'	Stadium: Central Stadium; Attendance: 11,012; Referee: M. Vilkov

29 August 2015 7	Zenit St. Petersburg	1 – 3	Krylia Sovetov	Saint Petersburg
17:00 MSK (UTC+3)	Nadson 49' (o.g.); Criscito (yellow card) 67'	Summary	Gabulov 17'; Taranov (yellow card) 27'; Pomerko (yellow card) 37'; Kornilenko 52', 56'; Konyukhov (yellow card) 70'	Stadium: Petrovsky Stadium; Attendance: 17,974; Referee: I. Fedotov

12 September 2015 8	CSKA Moscow	2 – 2	Zenit St. Petersburg	Khimki
14:00 MSK (UTC+3)	Lombaerts 9' (o.g.); Doumbia 22'; Tošić (yellow card) 38'; Wernbloom (yellow card) 44'	Summary	Hulk 39' (pen.); Dzyuba (yellow card) 41'; García (yellow card) 52'; Garay (yellow card) 79'; Witsel (yellow card) 79'; Smolnikov 88'	Stadium: Arena Khimki; Attendance: 15,000; Referee: V. Meshkov

20 September 2015 9	Zenit St. Petersburg	1 – 1	Amkar Perm	Saint Petersburg
17:00 MSK (UTC+3)	Dzyuba 10', (yellow card) 52'	Summary	Belorukov (yellow card) 58'; Anene 66'; Shavayev (yellow card) 89'; Selikhov (yellow card) 90+3'	Stadium: Petrovsky Stadium; Attendance: 16,480; Referee: A. Nikolaev

26 September 2015 10	Spartak Moscow	2 – 2	Zenit St. Petersburg	Moscow
19:00 MSK (UTC+3)	Zé Luís 6'; Popov 70'	Summary	Hulk 27'; Danny (yellow card) 43'; Dzyuba 87'	Stadium: Otkrytie Arena; Attendance: 41,214; Referee: S. Ivanov

3 October 2015 11	Zenit St. Petersburg	3 – 0	Rostov	Saint Petersburg
17:00 MSK (UTC+3)	Smolnikov 26'; Dzyuba 34'; Danny 89'	Summary	Azmoun (yellow card) 42'	Stadium: Petrovsky Stadium; Attendance: 16,703; Referee: A. Egorov

17 October 2015 12	Kuban Krasnodar	2 – 2	Zenit St. Petersburg	Krasnodar
19:00 MSK (UTC+3)	Xandão 2'; Manolev (yellow card) 29'; Khubulov (yellow card) 31'; Melgarejo 64'	Summary	Neto (yellow card) 35'; Dzyuba 44'; Shatov 54'; Hulk (yellow card) 67'; Yusupov (yellow card) 77'	Stadium: Kuban Stadium; Attendance: 14,427; Referee: A. Eskov

24 October 2015 13	Zenit St. Petersburg	5 – 1	Anzhi Makhachkala	Saint Petersburg
17:00 MSK (UTC+3)	Dzyuba 7', 67'; Criscito (yellow card) 16'; Yusupov (yellow card) 43'; Witsel 55'; Shatov 73'; Hulk 85'	Summary	Maksimov 48'; Haruna (yellow card) 67'	Stadium: Petrovsky Stadium; Attendance: 16,970; Referee: V. Moskalev

31 October 2015 14	Zenit St. Petersburg	0 – 0	Mordovia Saransk	Saint Petersburg
17:00 MSK (UTC+3)	Danny (yellow card) 90+6'	Summary	Tishkin (yellow card) 72'; Makhmudov (yellow card) 73'; Revishvili (yellow card) 90+4'	Stadium: Petrovsky Stadium; Attendance: 15,647; Referee: M. Vilkov

8 November 2015 15	Lokomotiv Moscow	2 – 0	Zenit St. Petersburg	Moscow
19:30 MSK (UTC+3)	Lombaerts 48' (o.g.); Samedov 58'; Maicon (yellow card) 62'; Denisov (yellow card) 80'	Summary	Hulk (yellow card) 49'; García (yellow card) 61'; Neto (yellow card) 74'	Stadium: Lokomotiv Stadium; Attendance: 14,140; Referee: V. Moskalev

21 November 2015 16	Zenit St. Petersburg	3 – 0	Ural	Saint Petersburg
16:30 MSK (UTC+3)	Garay 12'; Shatov (yellow card) 55'; Dzyuba 76'; Yusupov (yellow card) 81'; García 89'	Report	Martynovich (yellow card) 49'	Stadium: Petrovsky Stadium; Attendance: 14,880; Referee: S. Karasev

28 November 2015 17	Terek Grozny	4 – 1	Zenit St. Petersburg	Grozny
17:30 MSK (UTC+3)	Mitrishev 32', 55', (yellow card) 73'; Gorodov (yellow card) 41'; Rybus 42', 87'; Kudryashov (yellow card) 69'; Ivanov (yellow card) 84'; Maurício (yellow card) 90+2'	Summary	Hulk 54', (yellow card) 90+1'; Yevseyev (red card) 72'; García (yellow card) 80'	Stadium: Akhmat-Arena; Attendance: 19,780; Referee: S. Ivanov

3 December 2015 18	Zenit St. Petersburg	1 – 1	Ufa	Saint Petersburg
19:00 MSK (UTC+3)	Criscito (yellow card) 8'; Danny (yellow card) 31'; Garay 86' (pen.)	Report	Zinchenko 36'; Yurchenko (yellow card) 69'; Igboun (yellow card) 80'; Nikitin (yellow card) 85'	Stadium: Petrovsky Stadium; Attendance: 15,203; Referee: I. Fedotov

5 March 2016 19	Krasnodar	0 – 0	Zenit St. Petersburg	Krasnodar
19:30 MSK (UTC+3)	Kaboré (yellow card) 61'; Laborde (yellow card) 73'	Report	García (yellow card) 17'; Hulk (yellow card) 45'	Stadium: Kuban Stadium; Attendance: 16,650; Referee: S. Karasev

13 March 2016 20	Zenit St. Petersburg	4 – 2	Rubin Kazan	Saint Petersburg
20:30 MSK (UTC+3)	Danny 5', 65'; Zhirkov (yellow card) 25'; Neto (yellow card) 40'; Dzyuba 42'; Hulk 48'; Yusupov (yellow card) 90+3'	Report	Kambolov (yellow card) 58'; Dević 64'; Portnyagin 68'	Stadium: Petrovsky Stadium; Attendance: 16,797; Referee: V. Moskalev

20 March 2016 21	Krylia Sovetov	0 – 2	Zenit St. Petersburg	Saransk
15:30 MSK (UTC+3)	Mollo (yellow card) 33'	Report	Dzyuba 20'; Hulk 26' (pen.)	Stadium: Start Stadium; Attendance: 5,320; Referee: A. Nikolayev

3 April 2016 22	Zenit St. Petersburg	2 – 0	CSKA Moscow	Saint Petersburg
MSK (UTC+3)	Hulk 54', 79'; Smolnikov (yellow card) 58'; Witsel (yellow card) 81'	Report	Wernbloom (yellow card) 42'; Berezutski (yellow card) 78'	Stadium: Petrovsky Stadium; Attendance: 17,835; Referee: A. Yegorov

9 April 2016 23	Amkar Perm	0 – 2	Zenit St. Petersburg	Perm
MSK (UTC+3)	Gol (yellow card) 20'; Zanev (yellow card) 26'; Anene (yellow card) 27'; Belorukov (yellow card) 56'; Selikhov (yellow card) 86'; Zaytsev (yellow card) 90'	Report	Neto (yellow card) 8'; Hulk (yellow card) 23'; Dzyuba 30'; Smolnikov (yellow card) 56'; Lodygin (yellow card) 65'; Kokorin 86'	Stadium: Zvezda Stadium; Attendance: 15,350; Referee: V. Meshkov

14 April 2016 24	Zenit St. Petersburg	5 – 2	Spartak Moscow	Saint Petersburg
MSK (UTC+3)	Witsel 15'; Hulk (yellow card) 35', (goal) 46'; Neto (yellow card) 41'; Dzyuba 65'; Maurício 73'; García 87'; Lombaerts (yellow card) 90+3'	Report	Popov 10'; Glushakov 21', (yellow card) 32'; Bocchetti (yellow card) 35'; Makeyev (yellow card) 35' (yellow-red card) 78'; Promes (yellow card) 87'	Stadium: Petrovsky Stadium; Attendance: 18,000; Referee: M. Vilkov

24 April 2016 25	Rostov	3 – 0	Zenit St. Petersburg	Rostov-on-Don
19:30 MSK (UTC+3)	Kanga (yellow card) 41', (goal) 44'; Azmoun 59'; Yerokhin 76'	Report	Witsel (yellow card) 70'; Kokorin (yellow card) 88'	Stadium: Olimp-2; Attendance: 15,800; Referee: Sergey Karasev

28 April 2016 26	Zenit St. Petersburg	4 – 1	Kuban Krasnodar	Saint Petersburg
MSK (UTC+3)	Shatov 22', 72'; García (yellow card) 30'; Dzyuba 39'; Hulk 65'	Report	Seleznyov 24'; Khubulov (yellow card) 37'	Stadium: Petrovsky Stadium; Attendance: 15,301; Referee: Aleksei Nikolayev

7 May 2016 27	Anzhi Makhachkala	0 - 1	Zenit St. Petersburg	Kaspiysk
18:00 MSK (UTC+3)	Berisha (yellow card) 9' (yellow-red card); Gadzhibekov (yellow card) 18'; Maksimov (yellow card) 45'; Mkrtchyan (yellow card) 90+4'; Mayewski (yellow card) 90+4'	Summary	Dzyuba 26'; Luís Neto (yellow card) 36'; Yusupov (yellow card) 45+1'; Smolnikov (yellow card) 50'; Criscito (yellow card) 67'; Zhirkov (yellow card) 76'	Stadium: Anzhi Arena; Attendance: 8,500; Referee: (Russia) Mikhail Vilkov

11 May 2016 28	Mordovia Saransk	0 - 3	Zenit St. Petersburg	Saransk
20:30 MSK (UTC+3)	Perendija (yellow card) 69'; Cebanu (yellow card) 69'	Summary	Maurício (yellow card) 33'; Witsel 45'; Hulk 54' (pen.) 71' (pen.)	Stadium: Start Stadium; Attendance: 9,913; Referee: (Russia) Aleksei Eskov (referee)

15 May 2016 29	Zenit St. Petersburg	1 - 1	Lokomotiv Moscow	Saint Petersburg
20:00 MSK (UTC+3)	Hulk 10' (pen.) (yellow card) 90+4'; Javi García (yellow card) 30'; Smolnikov (yellow card) 50'; Witsel (yellow card) 90+1'; Lodygin (yellow card) 90+7'; Luís Neto (yellow card) 90+8'	Summary	Marinato (yellow card) 9'; Yanbayev (yellow card) 26'; Samedov (yellow card) 41' (goal) 45+3' (pen.); Henty (yellow card) 60'; Miranchuk (yellow card) 88' (yellow-red card); Denisov (yellow card) 90+4'; Tarasov (yellow card) 90+8'	Stadium: Petrovsky Stadium; Attendance: 17,407; Referee: (Russia) Mikhail Vilkov

21 May 2016 30	Dynamo Moscow	0 - 3	Zenit St. Petersburg	Khimki
14:30 MSK (UTC+3)	Zhivoglyadov (yellow card) 41'; Gabulov (yellow card) 83'; Solomatin (yellow card) 90+1'	Summary	Dzyuba 59'; Kokorin 62' (yellow card) 67'; Criscito (yellow card) 86' (goal) 90+2' (pen.)	Stadium: Arena Khimki; Attendance: 12,407; Referee: (Russia) Sergei Ivanov

==== League table ====
Pos	Team	Pld	W	D	L	GF	GA	GD	Pts	Qualification or relegation
1	CSKA Moscow (C)	30	20	5	5	51	25	+26	65	Qualification for the Champions League group stage
2	Rostov	30	19	6	5	41	20	+21	63	Qualification for the Champions League third qualifying round
3	Zenit Saint Petersburg	30	17	8	5	61	32	+29	59	Qualification for the Europa League group stage (Note: Zenit Saint Petersburg qualified for the Europa League group stage by winning the 2015–16 Russian Cup.)
4	Krasnodar	30	16	8	6	54	25	+29	56	Qualification for the Europa League third qualifying round
5	Spartak Moscow	30	15	5	10	48	39	+9	50	Qualification for the Europa League third qualifying round

Source: Russian Premier League, Soccerway
Rules for classification: 1) Points; 2) Matches won; 3) Head-to-head points; 4) Head-to-head matches won; 5) Head-to-head goal difference; 6) Head-to-head goals scored; 7) Head-to-head away goals; 8) Goal difference; 9) Goals scored; 10) Away goals scored.
(C) Champions

=== Russian Super Cup ===
12 July 2015 Final	Zenit St. Petersburg	1 – 1 (a.e.t.) (4 – 2 p)	Lokomotiv Moscow	Saint Petersburg
19:00	Smolnikov 83'; Rondón (yellow card) 90+3'; Criscito (yellow card) 93'; Hulk (yellow card) 96'; Neto (yellow card) 105'	Summary	Niasse 28'; Kasaev (yellow card) 43'; Guilherme (yellow card) 54'; Tarasov (yellow card) 75'; Kolomeytsev (yellow card) 120+1'	Stadium: Petrovsky Stadium; Attendance: 17,337; Referee: A. Nikolaev
	Penalties
	Hulk (penalty scored); Witsel (penalty scored); Ansaldi (penalty scored); Shatov (penalty missed); Criscito (penalty scored)		Grigoryev (penalty missed); Samedov (penalty scored); Pejčinović (penalty scored); Ćorluka (penalty missed)

=== Russian Cup ===
23 September 2015 Round of 32	Volga Tver	0 – 3 (a.e.t.)	Zenit St. Petersburg	Tver
15:00 MSK (UTC+3)	Nastusenko (yellow card) 53'; Sargsyan (yellow card) 81'; Roshchin (yellow card) 96'	Summary	Lombaerts (yellow card) 20'; Danny (yellow card) 29'; Criscito (yellow card) 90'; Tkachuk 95', 105', 112'	Stadium: Khimik Stadium

29 October 2015 Round of 16	Zenit St. Petersburg	5 – 0	Tosno	Saint Petersburg
19:00 MSK (UTC+3)	Dzyuba 11', 39'; Witsel 18', 37'; Ryazantsev 44'; Lombaerts (yellow card) 67'; Neto (yellow card) 85'	Summary	Prychynenko (yellow card) 78'; Tetrashvili (yellow card) 84'; Smirnov (yellow card) 85'	Stadium: Petrovsky Stadium; Attendance: 16,156

28 February 2016 Quarter-finals	Zenit St. Petersburg	1 – 0 (a.e.t.)	Kuban Krasnodar	Saint Petersburg
20:00 MSK (UTC+3)	Hulk (yellow card) 62'; Maurício 104'	Summary	Seleznyov (yellow card) 5'; Kontsedalov (yellow card) 56'; Santana (yellow card) 77'; Rabiu (yellow card) 82'; Xandão (yellow card) 85'	Stadium: Petrovsky Stadium; Attendance: 17,646; Referee: A. Eskov

20 April 2016 Semi-finals	Amkar Perm	1 – 1 (a.e.t.) (3–4 p)	Zenit St. Petersburg	Perm
19:00 MSK (UTC+3)	Idowu 19'; Belorukov (yellow card) 62'; Selikhov (yellow card) 87'; Zanev (yellow card) 101'; Ogude (yellow card) 110'		Kokorin (yellow card) 32'; García 41'; Yusupov (yellow card) 59'; Garay (yellow card) 73'; Dzyuba (yellow card) 119'	Stadium: Zvezda Stadium; Attendance: 15,660; Referee: Igor Fedotov
	Penalties
	Peev (penalty missed); Shavayev (penalty missed); Ogude (penalty scored); Selikhov (penalty scored); Prudnikov (penalty scored); Zaytsev (penalty missed)		(penalty scored) Hulk; (penalty missed) Garay; (penalty missed) Dzyuba; (penalty scored) Witsel; (penalty scored) Criscito; (penalty scored) García

2 May 2016 Final	CSKA Moscow	1 – 4	Zenit St. Petersburg	Kazan
16:00 MSK (UTC+3)	Berezutski (yellow card) 18'; Olanare 36'; Eremenko (yellow card) 53'; Berezutski (red card) 62'; Panchenko (yellow card) 68'	Summary	Hulk 34' (pen.) 63' (pen.) (yellow card) 78'; Kokorin 55'; Yusupov 69'; Shatov (yellow card) 75'	Stadium: Kazan Arena; Attendance: 36,562; Referee: (Russia) Aleksandr Egorov

=== Champions League ===
==== Group stage ====
Pos	Team	Pld	W	D	L	GF	GA	GD	Pts	Qualification	ZEN	GNT	VAL	LYO
1	(Russia) Zenit Saint Petersburg	6	5	0	1	13	6	+7	15	Advance to knockout phase	—	2–1	2–0	3–1
2	(Belgium) Gent	6	3	1	2	8	7	+1	10	Advance to knockout phase	2–1	—	1–0	1–1
3	(Spain) Valencia	6	2	0	4	5	9	−4	6	Transfer to Europa League	2–3	2–1	—	0–2
4	(France) Lyon	6	1	1	4	5	9	−4	4		0–2	1–2	0–1	—

Source: UEFA

16 September 2015 1	Valencia (Spain)	2 – 3	(Russia) Zenit St. Petersburg	Valencia
23:45 MSK (UTC+3)	Alcácer (yellow card) 53'; Cancelo 54'; Gomes 73', (yellow card) 90+6'; Mustafi (yellow card) 90+4'	Summary	Hulk 9', 44', (yellow card) 90+6'; Smolnikov (yellow card) 16'; Witsel (yellow card) 61', (goal) 76'	Stadium: Mestalla Stadium; Attendance: 28,005; Referee: Craig Thomson (Scotland)

29 September 2015 2	Zenit St. Petersburg (Russia)	2 – 1	(Belgium) Gent	Saint Petersburg
21:45 MSK (UTC+3)	Dzyuba 35'; García (yellow card) 60'; Shatov 67'	Summary	Depoitre (yellow card) 42'; Matton 56'; Sayef (yellow card) 88'; Pedersen (yellow card) 90'	Stadium: Petrovsky Stadium; Attendance: 18,095; Referee: Matej Jug (Slovenia)

20 October 2015 3	Zenit St. Petersburg (Russia)	3 – 1	(France) Lyon	Saint Petersburg
21:45 MSK (UTC+3)	Dzyuba 3'; Hulk (yellow card) 5' (goal) 56'; García (yellow card) 51'; Danny 82'	Report	Gonalons (yellow card) 39'; Rafael (yellow card) 46'; Lacazette 49'; Umtiti (yellow card) 51'; Yanga-Mbiwa (yellow card) 90+2'	Stadium: Petrovsky Stadium; Attendance: 17,517; Referee: Martin Atkinson (England)

4 November 2015 4	Lyon (France)	0 – 2	(Russia) Zenit St. Petersburg	Lyon
21:45 MSK (UTC+3)	Gonalons (yellow card) 32' (yellow-red card) 72'	Summary	Witsel (yellow card) 20'; Dzyuba 25', 57'; Criscito (yellow card) 46'; García (yellow card) 54'; Anyukov (yellow card) 56' (yellow-red card) 88'; Danny (yellow card) 74'; Shatov (yellow card) 90'	Stadium: Stade de Gerland; Referee: Felix Brych (Germany)

24 November 2015 5	Zenit St. Petersburg (Russia)	2 – 0	(Spain) Valencia	Saint Petersburg
19:00 MSK (UTC+3)	Shatov 15'; Criscito (yellow card) 17'; Yusupov (yellow card) 71'; Dzyuba 74'; Witsel (yellow card) 78'	Summary	Mir (yellow card) 45'; Vezo (red card) 80'	Stadium: Petrovsky Stadium; Attendance: 17,002; Referee: Svein Oddvar Moen (Norway)

9 December 2015 6	Gent (Belgium)	2 – 1	(Russia) Zenit St. Petersburg	Ghent
21:45 MSK (UTC+3)	Depoitre 18'; Milićević 78', (yellow card) 79'; Mitrović (yellow card) 90+2'	Report	Garay (yellow card) 44'; Dzyuba 65'; García (yellow card) 75'; Yusupov (yellow card) 76'; Lodygin (yellow card) 79'; Lombaerts (yellow card) 89'; Danny (yellow card) 90+2'	Stadium: Ghelamco Arena; Referee: Jorge Sousa (Portugal)

==== Knockout phase ====
===== Round of 16 =====
16 February 2016 1	Benfica (Portugal)	1 – 0	(Russia) Zenit St. Petersburg	Lisbon
23:45 MSK (UTC+3)	Almeida (yellow card) 16'; Jardel (yellow card) 35'; Pizzi (yellow card) 43'; Jonas 90+1', (yellow card) 90+2'	Report	Witsel (yellow card) 32'; García (yellow card) 59'; Criscito (yellow card) 67' (yellow-red card) 90'	Stadium: Estádio da Luz; Attendance: 48,615; Referee: Gianluca Rocchi (Italy)

9 March 2016 2	Zenit St. Petersburg (Russia)	1 – 2 (1 – 3 agg.)	(Portugal) Benfica	Saint Petersburg
20:00 MSK (UTC+3)	Hulk 69', (yellow card) 90+5'	Report	Mitroglou (yellow card) 36'; Pizzi (yellow card) 49'; Gaitán 85'; Talisca 90+6'	Stadium: Petrovsky Stadium; Attendance: 17,688; Referee: Viktor Kassai (Hungary)

== Squad statistics ==
As of match played 28 April 2016

=== Appearances and goals ===
No.	Pos	Nat	Player	Total		Premier League		Super Cup		Russian Cup		Champions League	
No.	Pos	Nat	Player	Apps	Goals	Apps	Goals	Apps	Goals	Apps	Goals	Apps	Goals
1	GK	(Russia) RUS	Yuri Lodygin	37	0	27	0	1	0	2+1	0	6	0
2	DF	(Russia) RUS	Aleksandr Anyukov	25	0	15	0	0	0	3	0	7	0
4	DF	(Italy) ITA	Domenico Criscito	35	0	23	0	1	0	5	0	6	0
6	DF	(Belgium) BEL	Nicolas Lombaerts	29	0	18	0	1	0	2	0	8	0
7	FW	(Brazil) BRA	Hulk	39	23	27	17	1	0	4	2	7	4
8	MF	(Brazil) BRA	Maurício	14	2	11	1	0	0	0+1	1	1+1	0
9	FW	(Russia) RUS	Aleksandr Kokorin	14	3	10	2	0	0	2	1	1+1	0
10	MF	(Portugal) POR	Danny	33	7	18+5	6	0	0	2	0	8	1
13	DF	(Portugal) POR	Luís Neto	35	0	22	0	1	0	5	0	4+3	0
14	MF	(Russia) RUS	Artur Yusupov	34	1	23	0	1	0	3+1	1	1+5	0
17	MF	(Russia) RUS	Oleg Shatov	37	10	27	8	1	0	1+1	0	5+2	2
19	DF	(Russia) RUS	Igor Smolnikov	34	4	26	3	1	1	1+1	0	3+2	0
20	MF	(Russia) RUS	Viktor Faizulin	7	0	1+4	0	0	0	1	0	0+1	0
21	MF	(Spain) ESP	Javi García	38	4	26	3	1	0	5	1	6	0
22	FW	(Russia) RUS	Artyom Dzyuba	43	23	30	15	1	0	2+2	2	8	6
24	DF	(Argentina) ARG	Ezequiel Garay	28	2	20	2	0	0	2	0	6	0
28	MF	(Belgium) BEL	Axel Witsel	41	6	29	3	1	0	2+2	2	7	1
41	GK	(Russia) RUS	Mikhail Kerzhakov	7	0	3	0	0	0	2	0	2	0
68	MF	(Russia) RUS	Vyacheslav Zinkov	1	0	0	0	0	0	1	0	0	0
70	FW	(Russia) RUS	Dmitri Bogaev	3	0	0+1	0	0	0	1	0	0+1	0
79	MF	(Russia) RUS	Konstantin Troyanov	1	0	0	0	0	0	0	0	0+1	0
81	MF	(Russia) RUS	Yuri Zhirkov	12	0	9	0	0	0	1	0	1+1	0
92	FW	(Russia) RUS	Pavel Dolgov	9	0	0+6	0	0	0	1+1	0	0+1	0
94	MF	(Russia) RUS	Aleksei Yevseyev	7	0	0+5	0	0	0	1	0	0+1	0
Players away from the club on loan:
3	DF	(Argentina) ARG	Cristian Ansaldi	1	0	0	0	0	0	0+1	0	0	0
5	MF	(Russia) RUS	Aleksandr Ryazantsev	19	1	1+10	0	0+1	0	2	1	1+4	0
Players who appeared for Zenit but left during the season:
23	FW	(Venezuela) VEN	Salomón Rondón	2	0	0+1	0	0	0	0+1	0	0	0
31	MF	(Russia) RUS	Denis Tkachuk	9	3	0+7	0	0	0	0+2	3	0	0

=== Goal Scorers ===
Place	Position	Nation	Number	Name	Russian Premier League	Super Cup	Russian Cup	Champions League	Total
1	FW	(Russia)	22	Artyom Dzyuba	15	0	2	6	23
2	FW	(Brazil)	7	Hulk	17	0	2	4	23
3	MF	(Russia)	17	Oleg Shatov	8	0	0	2	10
4	MF	(Portugal)	10	Danny	6	0	0	1	7
5	MF	(Belgium)	28	Axel Witsel	3	0	2	1	6
6	DF	(Russia)	19	Igor Smolnikov	3	1	0	0	4
7	FW	(Russia)	9	Aleksandr Kokorin	2	0	1	0	3
7	MF	(Spain)	21	Javi García	2	0	1	0	3
7	MF	(Russia)	31	Denis Tkachuk	0	0	3	0	3
10	DF	(Argentina)	24	Ezequiel Garay	2	0	0	0	2
10	MF	(Brazil)	8	Maurício	1	0	1	0	2
12	DF	(Italy)	4	Domenico Criscito	1	0	0	0	1
12	MF	(Russia)	5	Aleksandr Ryazantsev	0	0	1	0	1
12	MF	(Russia)	14	Artur Yusupov	0	0	1	0	1
				TOTALS	60 +1 o.g.	1	14	14	90

=== Disciplinary record ===
Number	Nation	Position	Name	Russian Premier League		Super Cup		Russian Cup		Champions League		Total	
Number	Nation	Position	Name	Yellow card	Red card	Yellow card	Red card	Yellow card	Red card	Yellow card	Red card	Yellow card	Red card
1	(Russia)	GK	Yuri Lodygin	1	0	0	0	0	0	1	0	2	0
2	(Russia)	DF	Aleksandr Anyukov	0	0	0	0	0	0	1	1	1	1
4	(Italy)	DF	Domenico Criscito	3	0	1	0	1	0	3	1	8	1
6	(Belgium)	DF	Nicolas Lombaerts	1	0	0	0	2	0	1	0	4	0
7	(Brazil)	FW	Hulk	7	0	1	0	1	0	3	0	12	0
9	(Russia)	FW	Kokorin	1	0	0	0	1	0	0	0	2	0
10	(Portugal)	MF	Danny	3	0	0	0	1	0	2	0	6	0
13	(Portugal)	DF	Luís Neto	8	0	1	0	1	0	0	0	10	0
14	(Russia)	MF	Artur Yusupov	5	0	0	0	1	0	2	0	8	0
17	(Russia)	MF	Oleg Shatov	2	0	0	0	0	0	1	0	3	0
19	(Russia)	DF	Igor Smolnikov	2	0	0	0	0	0	1	0	3	0
21	(Spain)	MF	Javi García	6	0	0	0	0	0	5	0	11	0
22	(Russia)	FW	Artyom Dzyuba	2	0	0	0	1	0	0	0	3	0
23	(Venezuela)	FW	Salomón Rondón	0	0	1	0	0	0	0	0	1	0
24	(Argentina)	DF	Ezequiel Garay	1	0	0	0	1	0	1	0	3	0
28	(Belgium)	MF	Axel Witsel	3	0	0	0	0	0	4	0	7	0
81	(Russia)	MF	Yuri Zhirkov	1	0	0	0	0	0	0	0	1	0
94	(Russia)	MF	Aleksei Yevseyev	0	1	0	0	0	0	0	0	0	1
			TOTALS	46	1	4	0	10	0	25	2	85	3
