= Chondroyannos =

Chondroyannos or Chondrogiannis (Greek: Χονδρόγιαννος, Χονδρογιάννης) is a Greek patronymic surname; Chondro (Greek: Χονδρός) for thick or rough and Yannos a derivative of the name Giannis (Greek: Γιάννης) or John. The prefix 'Chondro' is seen combined with other common forenames to form multiple Greek surnames, i.e. Chondrogiorgos, Chondronikolas. Today, it is most common in Greece in the island of Corfu.

== Notable people ==
- Giannis Chondrogiannis (1761–1835), Greek politician and revolutionary leader
