= Margaritis =

Margaritis (Greek: Μαργαρίτης) is a Greek surname. The female version is Margariti (Greek: Μαργαρίτη). It may refer to:

- Alexandros Margaritis (born 1984), Greek-German racing driver
- Dimitrios Margaritis, fighter in the Greek War of Independence
- Filippos Margaritis, merchant, member of the Filiki Eteria
- Filippos Margaritis (1839–1892), Greek photographer
- Giorgos Margaritis (born 1991), Greek footballer
- Yannis Margaritis, Greek theatre director

== See also ==
- Margariti, a municipality in Greece
- Margariti, a settlement in Greece
