= Yianna =

Yianna may refer to:

- Yianna Katsoulos (born 1960), European-American singer
- Yianna Stavrous (fl. 2010s), Australian singer on The Voice season 1 in Australia
- Yianna Olymbiou (fl. 1950s), actress at the Lemos Theater
- SS John Stagg, named Yianna from 1961 to 1968

== See also ==
- Gianna
- Joanna
- Yannis
- Ioannis
