= Hannus =

Hannus is a surname. Notable people with the surname include:

- Arja Hannus, Swedish orienteer
- L. Adrien Hannus (born 1944), American anthropologist and archaeologist
