= Anders Piltz =

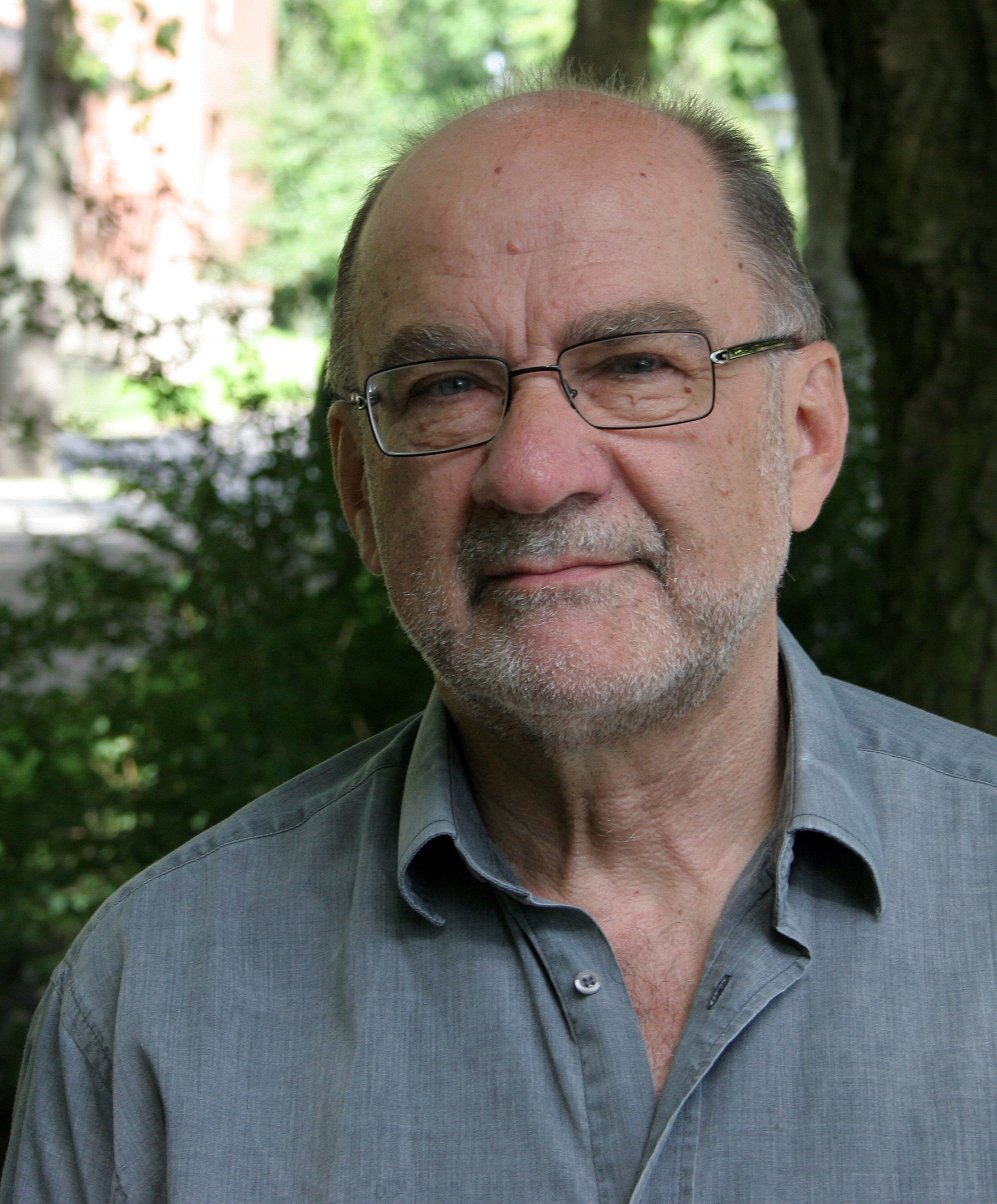
Anders Piltz

Anders Piltz OP (born 7 March 1943) is a Swedish Latinist, medievalist, Dominican friar, and Roman Catholic priest.

Born in Ödeborg in Dalsland, Piltz studied at the University of Uppsala and at the Pontifical University of St. Thomas Aquinas (Angelicum) in Rome. He completed his Ph.D. at Uppsala in 1977. From 1981 he taught at Lund University, where he was appointed professor of Latin in 2000. He is now active as professor emeritus. Piltz's university homepage describes his early career as having focused initially on medieval Latin text criticism, but later shifting towards the history of ideas.

Piltz's first published work was a Prolegomena to a text-critical edition of the work Homo conditus by Magister Mathias Ouidi (c 1300 – c. 1350), the confessor of Saint Bridget of Sweden whom Piltz considers the foremost theologian of the mediaeval Swedish Catholic church. He later returned to the topic in his edition Magistri Mathiae canonici Lincopensis opus sub nomine. Homo conditus, vulgatum (1984), and a selection of texts from Homo conditus in Swedish translation, at the Swedish Catholic publisher Katolska bokförlaget (in 1986). His 1977 dissertation, Studium Upsalense, was a study and edition of few extant sources for the curriculum of the mediaeval University of Uppsala, mainly the preserved lecture notes of the late 15th century Uppsala student Olaus Johannis Gutho, later a Bridgettine monk at Vadstena.

His book Medeltidens lärda värld (Stockholm: Carmina, 1978) on the curriculum and tradition of learning in medieval universities and schools, was translated and published in German and English editions. In a review, the American historian Edward Peters summarized the English edition of the book, The world of medieval learning, as "a distinguished book by a master that is ideally a companion to conventional histories of medieval thought and learning."

Piltz has also published several popular books on religious and historical issues, and is, as a Roman Catholic priest, often used as a spokesperson for the Catholic view in discussions on religious and philosophical matters in Swedish newspapers, radio and television.

Anders Piltz was (along with the psychologist of religion (James W. Jones) one of the two persons awarded honorary doctorates from the Uppsala University Faculty of Theology in the fall semester 2002.

== Publications ==
- See the list of scholarly and popular publications at the official homepage of Anders Piltz at Lund University
