= Axel Witsel =

Belgian footballer (born 1989)

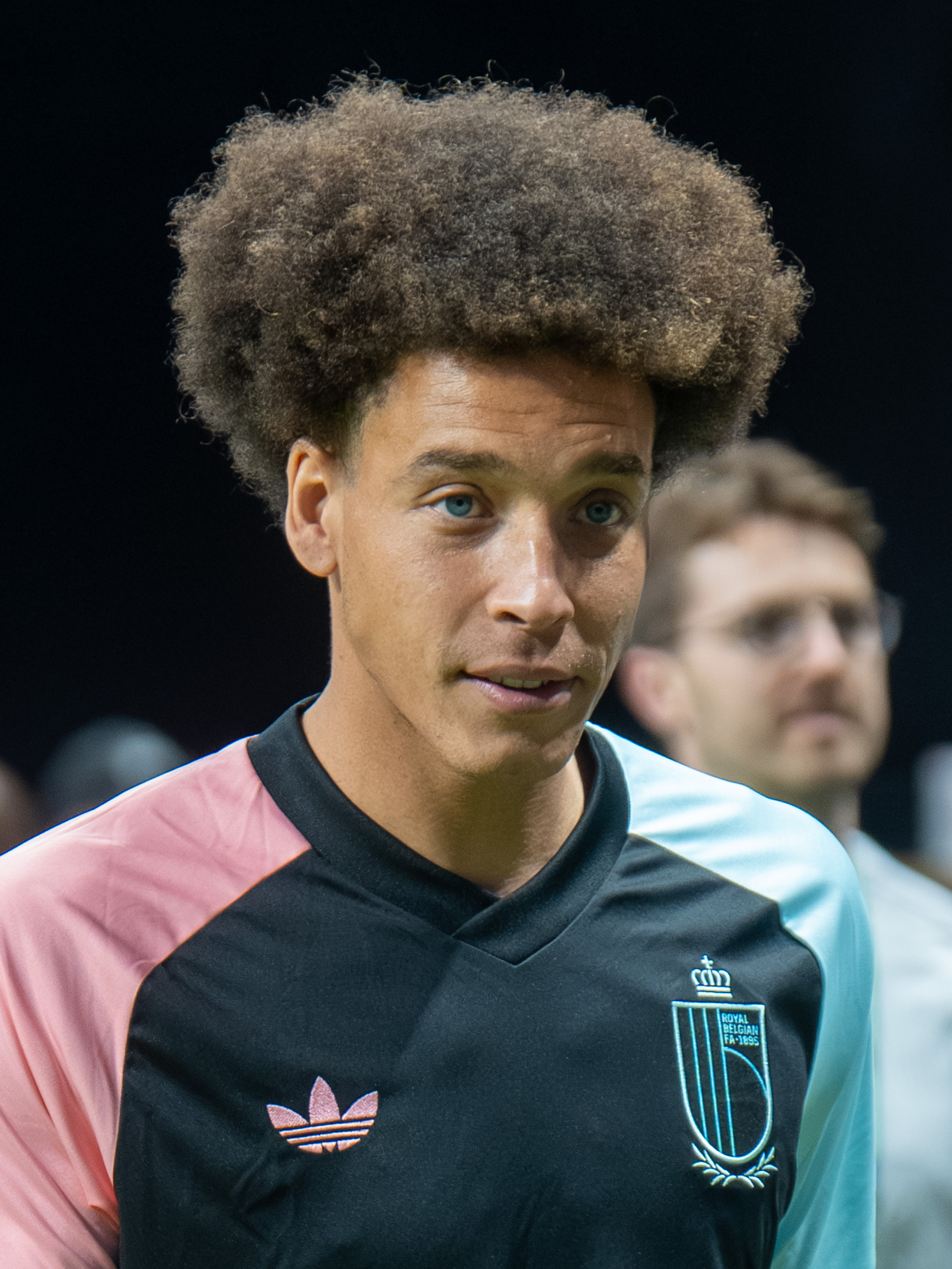
- Witsel with Belgium in 2026

Personal information
- Full name: Axel Laurent Angel Lambert Witsel
- Date of birth: 12 January 1989 (age 37)
- Place of birth: Liège, Belgium
- Height: 1.86 m (6 ft 1 in)
- Positions: Midfielder; centre-back

Team information
- Current team: Nice
- Number: 28

Youth career
- 1995–1997: RRC Vottem
- 1997–1999: CS Visé
- 1999–2006: Standard Liège

Senior career*
| Years | Team | Apps | (Gls) |
| 2006–2011 | Standard Liège | 148 | (33) |
| 2011–2012 | Benfica | 32 | (1) |
| 2012–2016 | Zenit Saint Petersburg | 122 | (16) |
| 2017–2018 | Tianjin Tianhai | 36 | (5) |
| 2018–2022 | Borussia Dortmund | 105 | (10) |
| 2022–2025 | Atlético Madrid | 82 | (2) |
| 2025–2026 | Girona | 32 | (1) |
| 2026– | Nice | 6 | (0) |

International career
| 2004 | Belgium U15 | 1 | (0) |
| 2005 | Belgium U16 | 3 | (0) |
| 2005–2006 | Belgium U17 | 20 | (0) |
| 2006–2007 | Belgium U18 | 5 | (0) |
| 2006 | Belgium U19 | 3 | (0) |
| 2007–2009 | Belgium U21 | 10 | (0) |
| 2008–2026 | Belgium | 140 | (12) |
Medal record
Men's football
Representing Belgium
FIFA World Cup
| Third place | 2018 Russia |
- * Club domestic league appearances and goals as of 18 October 2026 (UTC)

Axel Laurent Angel Lambert Witsel (French pronunciation: [akˈsɛl vɪtˈsɛl]; born 12 January 1989) is a Belgian professional footballer for Ligue 1 club Nice. A versatile midfielder, Witsel is known for his defensive intelligence, vision, playmaking ability, ball retention, and capacity to control the tempo of matches. He has primarily played as a defensive midfielder or central midfielder, but has also been deployed as a centre-back.

Witsel began his career at hometown club Standard Liège, making 183 appearances and scoring 42 goals while winning five domestic trophies. He was awarded the Belgian Golden Shoe in 2008. After a season in Portugal with Benfica, he signed for Zenit Saint Petersburg for a €40 million fee in 2012. Witsel won four honours during his time in Russia, before leaving for Tianjin Tianhai in January 2017. He returned to Europe with Borussia Dortmund in August 2018. With the Bundesliga side, Witsel won the 2019 DFL-Supercup and the 2020–21 DFB-Pokal.

Witsel made his senior international debut for Belgium in 2008, and earned his 100th cap on 15 November 2018. He represented the country at the FIFA World Cup in 2014, 2018, 2022 and 2026, and the UEFA European Championship in 2016, 2020 and 2024, helping them to third place in the 2018 tournament. He retired from the national team in 2026 with 140 total appearances, making him Belgium's second-highest appearance maker.

== Club career ==
=== Standard Liège ===
On 17 September 2006, a 17-year-old Witsel made his debut with Standard Liège during a competitive game against FC Brussels when he replaced Steven Defour in the 89th minute. Eleven days later, he made his European debut as a substitute.

During the 2007–08 season, at 18 years of age, he was a key member in the squad of Standard Liège, winners of the Belgian League title that year. During this year, he formed a very young midfield together with other Belgian talents Defour and Marouane Fellaini. In the following season, he scored the winning goal from the penalty spot in a two-legged playoff to decide the championship.

On 30 August 2009, Witsel sparked controversy when he broke Marcin Wasilewski's leg by stamping on his ankle during the match between Anderlecht and Standard. Following the tackle, Witsel protested the red card, claiming that it was an accident without intent, before being sent off the pitch. He soon apologised, but was the subject of criticism from several media outlets and numerous death threats from angry Anderlecht and Poland fans. The initial ban until 23 November by the Belgian Football Association, was later reduced on appeal to eight matches.

=== Benfica ===
Witsel signed for Portuguese club Benfica on a five-year deal on 13 July 2011, including a €40 million buyout clause. Witsel scored twice in the 3–1 win against FC Twente, in the Champions League play-off second leg, on 24 August 2011, sending Benfica to the group stages with a 5–3 aggregate victory.

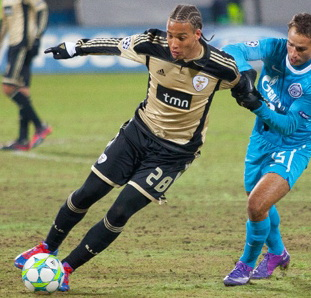
Witsel playing for Benfica against Zenit in 2012

He scored the opening goal in a 4–1 thrashing of Vitória de Guimarães in the Taça da Liga on 9 January 2012. He then assisted Nolito in a 4–1 league defeat of Vitória de Setúbal. Witsel scored his fourth goal against Santa Clara on 18 January in a Taça da Liga match. Benfica reached the final on 14 April against Gil Vicente and Witsel was awarded the Man of the Match award as Benfica claimed their fourth Taça da Liga title with a 2–1 victory.

=== Zenit Saint Petersburg ===
On 3 September 2012, Witsel signed for Zenit Saint Petersburg for €40 million, after signing a five-year contract. Witsel made his debut in the Russian Premier League on 14 September, replacing Konstantin Zyryanov in the 70th minute as Zenit fell 2–0 to Terek Grozny. He scored his first two goals for the club on 30 November when Zenit brushed aside Spartak Moscow 4–2 at the Luzhniki Stadium. Witsel scored Zenit's winner against Terek Grozny on 30 March 2013, an eighth-minute strike, as his side cruised to a 3–0 league victory.

In Zenit's first match of the 2014–15 UEFA Champions League group stage on 16 September 2014, Witsel scored Zenit's second goal in a 2–0 away victory over former club Benfica. After finishing third in their Champions League group, Zenit were parachuted into the Europa League knockout phase; in the first leg of their Round of 16 clash against Torino on 12 March 2015, Witsel scored on a rebound as Zenit defeated the Italian club 2–0. On 26 April, Witsel scored the game's only goal in the seventeenth minute as Zenit defeated Arsenal Tula in a league match at the Petrovsky Stadium. On Sunday 17 May, Witsel played the full 90 minutes as Zenit drew 1–1 with FC Ufa, earning the point they needed to secure the Premier League crown, the club's fourth overall and Witsel's first with Zenit.

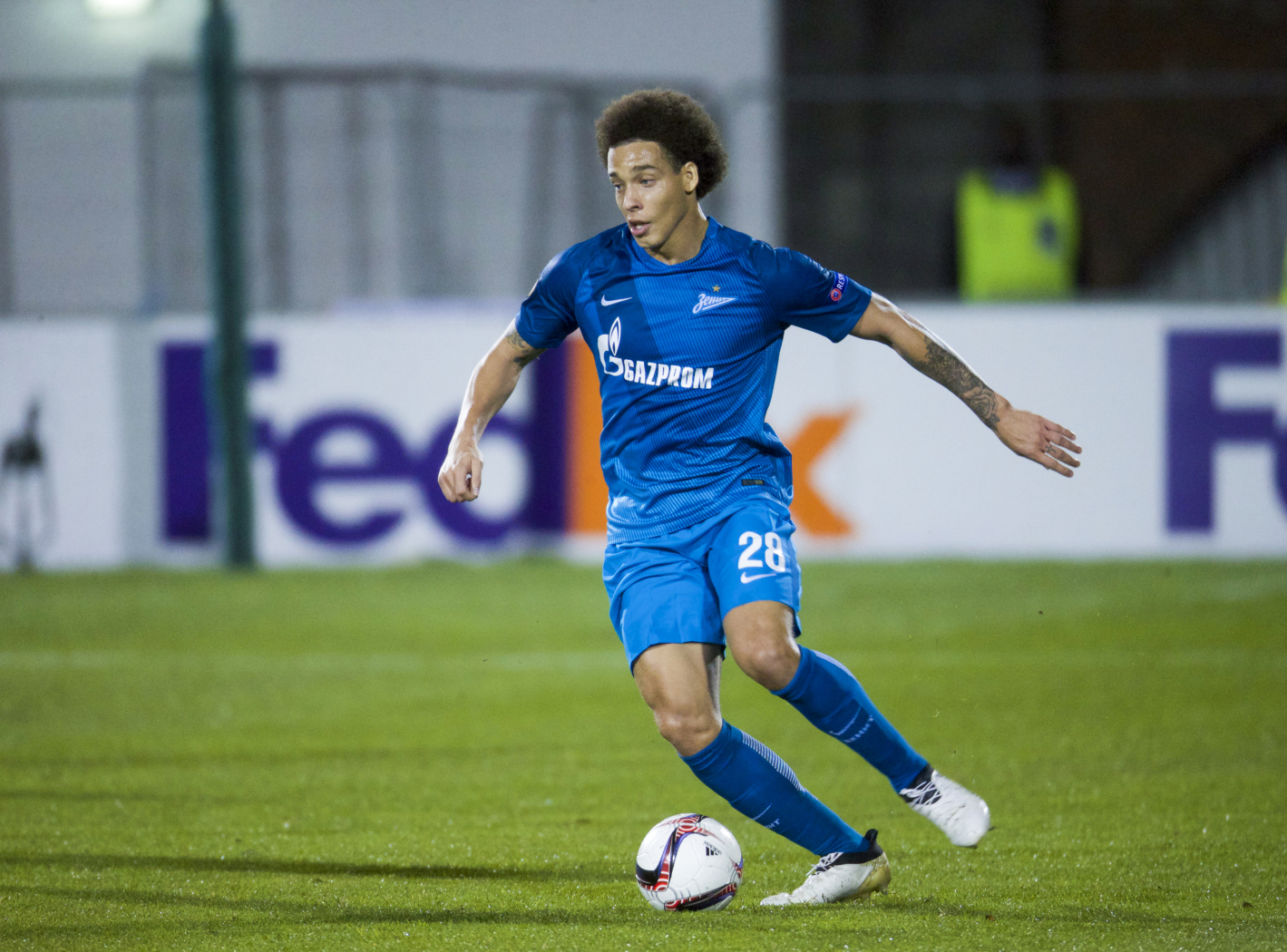
Witsel playing for Zenit Saint Petersburg against Dundalk in 2016

In the 2015 Russian Super Cup on 12 July 2015, Witsel converted his penalty shot in a 4–2 penalty shoot-out victory over FC Lokomotiv Moscow after the match had finished 1–1.

=== Tianjin Tianhai ===
On 3 January 2017, Zenit officially announced that Witsel has moved to Chinese club Tianjin Tianhai. A few months later, on 4 March, Witsel made his debut for Tianhai in a 2–0 loss to Guangzhou R&F. A week later he scored the club's first ever goal in the Chinese Super League during a 1–1 draw with Shanghai Greenland Shenhua.

=== Borussia Dortmund ===
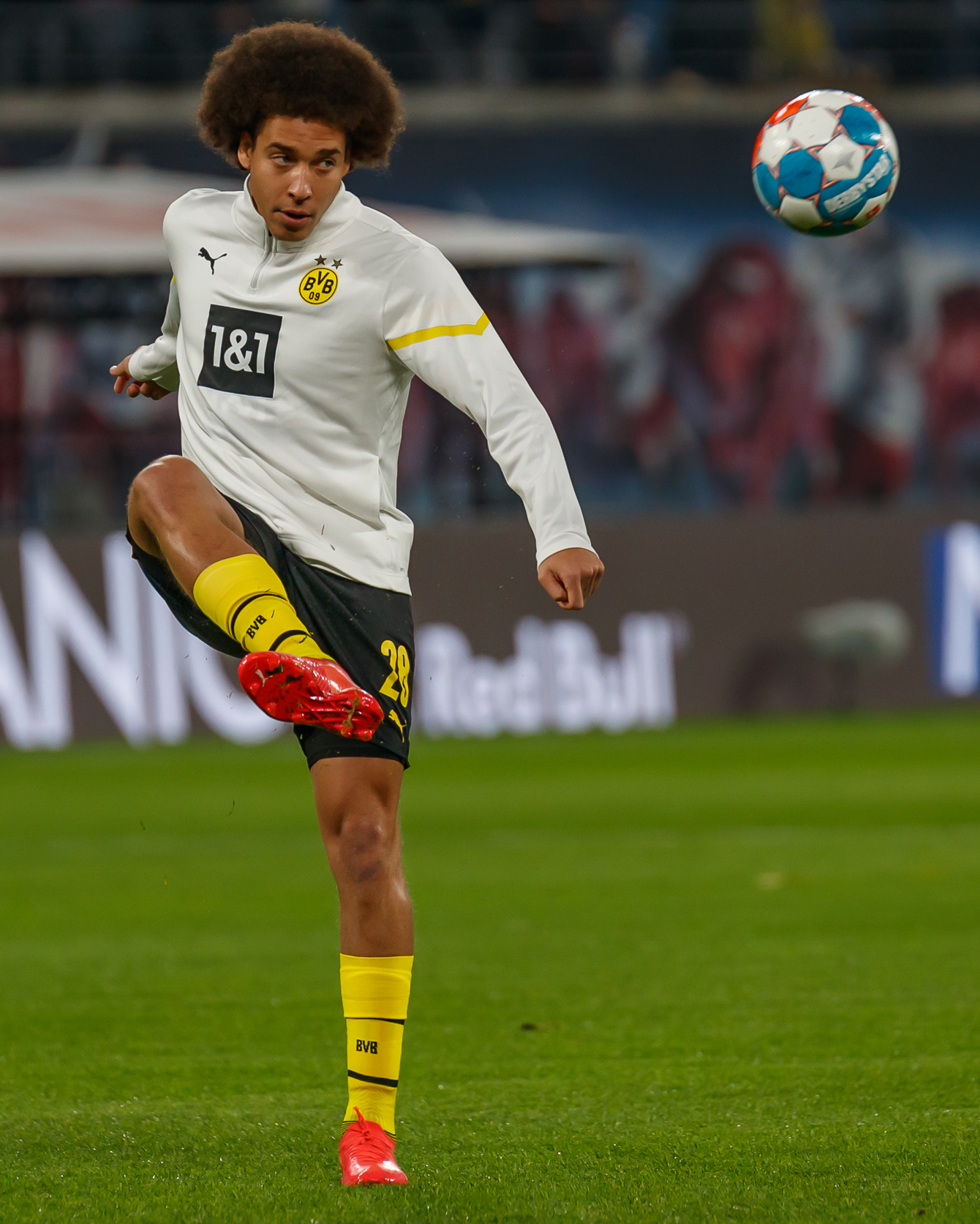
Witsel playing for Borussia Dortmund in 2021

On 6 August 2018, Witsel signed for Bundesliga club Borussia Dortmund and agreed a four-year contract which would last until 30 June 2022. On 21 August, he scored an equalizing goal in the stoppage time to make it 1–1 after coming on as a substitute on his debut for the club against SpVgg Greuther Fürth in the DFB-Pokal first round match and later his side went on to win the match in the extra time with a 2–1 victory. Witsel scored his first Bundesliga goal on his league debut for the club with an overhead kick in a 4–1 victory over RB Leipzig on 26 August.

=== Atlético Madrid ===
Witsel signed a one-year contract with Spanish club Atlético Madrid in July 2022, after his contract with Borussia Dortmund expired. Under manager Diego Simeone, Witsel began to play as a defender in the middle of a back three in the 5–3–2 formation. On 12 November 2023, he scored his first La Liga goal in a 3–1 victory over Villarreal.

On 13 June 2024, he extended his contract until 2025. He participated in the 2025 FIFA Club World Cup, scoring in a 3–1 group stage win against Seattle Sounders, before departing the club upon the expiration of his contract.

=== Girona ===
On 12 August 2025, Witsel signed a one-year deal with Girona also in the Spanish top tier. On 18 October 2025, he scored his first goal for Girona against Barcelona.

=== Nice ===
On 18 August 2026, Witsel signed a one-year deal with Ligue 1 side Nice.

== International career ==
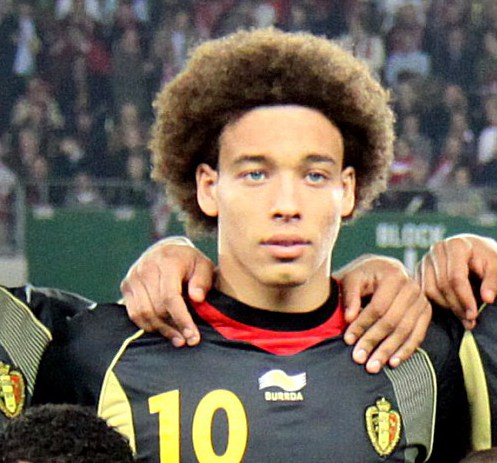
Witsel lining up for Belgium before playing Austria in the qualification for UEFA Euro 2012.

Prior to making his international debut for the senior side, Witsel played for the under-21 side in 2007, earning nine caps as well as helping his side reach the semi-finals of the 2007 UEFA European Under-21 Championship.

On 26 March 2008, Witsel made his senior international debut for Belgium during a friendly game against Morocco. The match resulted in a 1–4 loss, but Witsel scored his first goal.

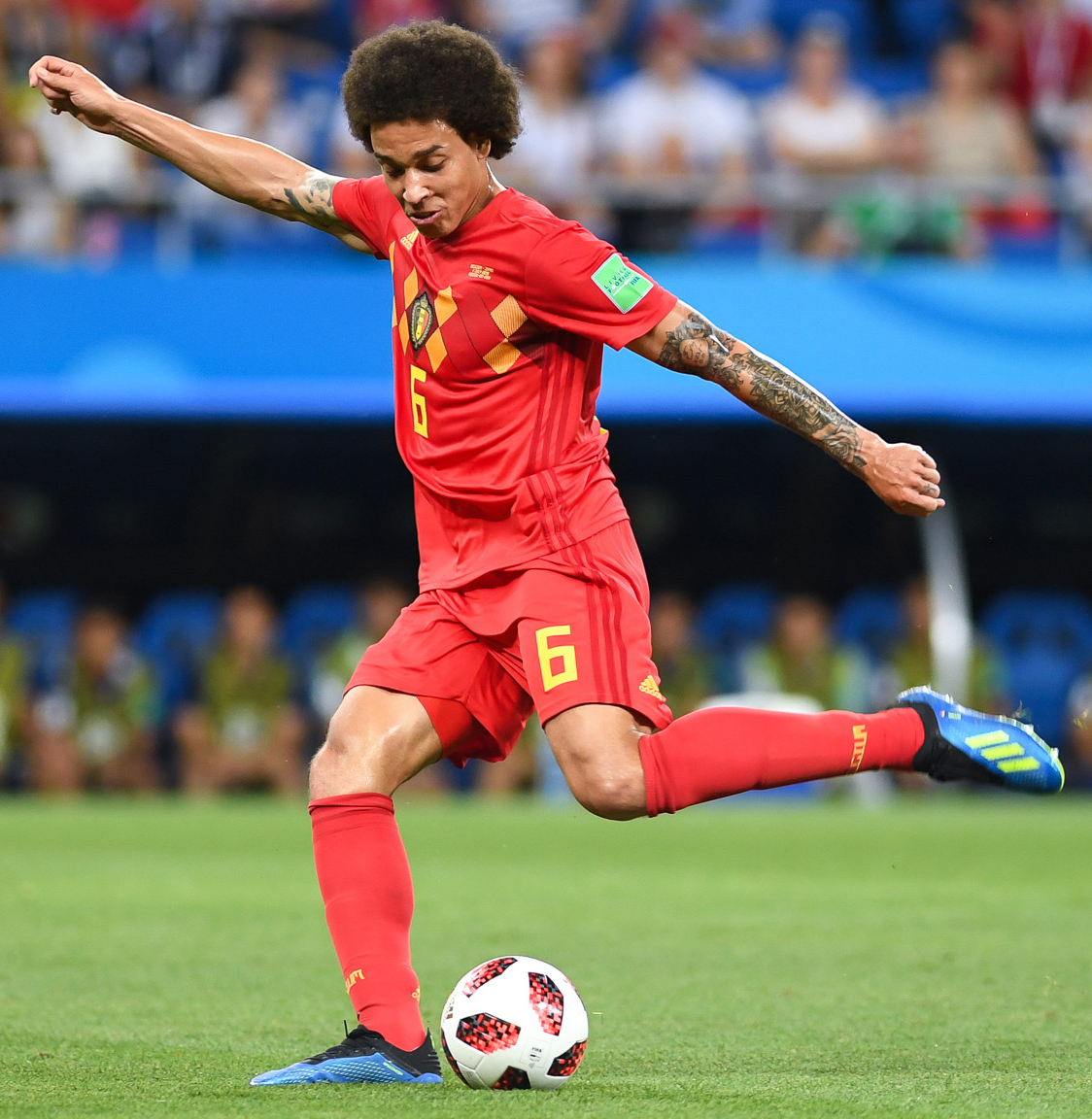
Witsel playing for Belgium during the 2018 FIFA World Cup.

Witsel's first goal in a competitive international match came a day short of three years after the Morocco goal, in the sixth minute against Austria in Group A of the UEFA Euro 2012 qualifying process, and his second would come in the second half. However, Belgian hopes of qualifying for UEFA Euro 2012 were dashed on 11 October 2011, by defeat to Germany coupled with Turkey's victory over Azerbaijan.

On 13 May 2014, Witsel was named in Belgium's squad for the 2014 FIFA World Cup. He started in midfield in the team's first game of the tournament, a 2–1 win against Algeria in Belo Horizonte.

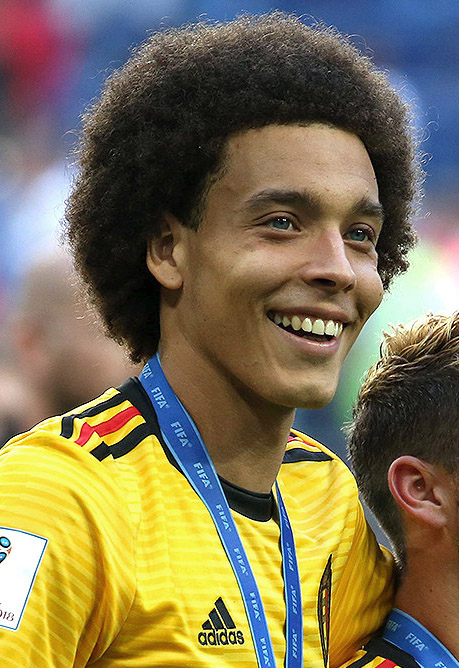
Witsel celebrating the bronze medal with Belgium at the 2018 FIFA World Cup.

Witsel also featured in the Belgian squad at UEFA Euro 2016, announced on 31 May 2016. He scored his first tournament goal during the Championships, in a Group E match against the Republic of Ireland.

He scored twice in 2018 FIFA World Cup qualification, both in wide victories over Gibraltar. Manager Roberto Martínez named him in the squad for the final tournament in Russia. Witsel was part of the Belgian squad for the 2022 World Cup in Qatar, where the team performed badly, failing to make it out of the group stage. On 17 March 2023, new Belgian coach Domenico Tedesco dropped Witsel from the squad for European Championship qualifying games, citing the player's lack of playing time.

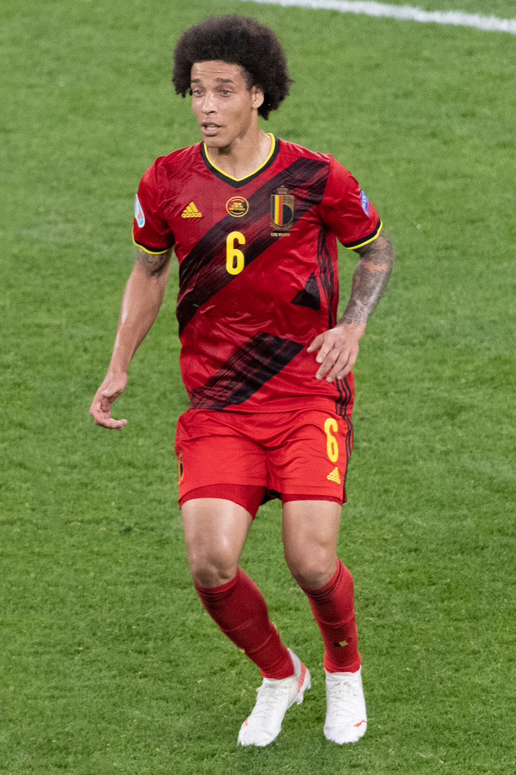
Witsel playing for Belgium during the UEFA Euro 2020.

On 12 May 2023, Witsel announced his retirement from the national team on Instagram, having made 130 appearances for Belgium. However, Witsel would later reverse his decision and on 28 May 2024, he was included in Belgium's squad for UEFA Euro 2024. On 15 May 2026, he was included in Belgium's 26-man squad for the 2026 FIFA World Cup. He featured at his fourth World Cup, coming on as a late substitute in Belgium's 4–1 victory over hosts the United States in the round of 16.

On 16 September 2026, Witsel again retired from the national team, having made 140 total appearances across eighteen years.

== Personal life ==
Witsel has been married since 2015 to Romanian-Hungarian Rafaella Szabo, with whom he has three children. He is of Martiniquais descent through his father Thierry Witsel who migrated to Belgium at the age of eight and became a member of the Walloon Parliament and Belgian Senate. He was a boyhood Arsenal fan.

== Career statistics ==
=== Club ===
As of match played 18 October 2026

Appearances and goals by club, season and competition
| Club | Season | League | | | National cup (Note: Includes Belgian Cup, Taça de Portugal, Russian Cup, Chinese FA Cup, DFB-Pokal, Copa del Rey) | | League cup (Note: Includes Taça da Liga) | | Continental | | Other | | Total | |
| Club | Season | Division | Apps | Goals | Apps | Goals | Apps | Goals | Apps | Goals | Apps | Goals | Apps | Goals |
|---|---|---|---|---|---|---|---|---|---|---|---|---|---|---|
| Standard Liège | 2006–07 | Belgian Pro League | 16 | 2 | — | | — | | 1 (Note: Appearance(s) in UEFA Cup) | 0 | — | | 17 | 2 |
| Standard Liège | 2007–08 | Belgian Pro League | 33 | 7 | — | | — | | 3 | 1 | — | | 36 | 8 |
| Standard Liège | 2008–09 | Belgian Pro League | 35 | 8 | — | | — | | 10 (Note: Two appearances in UEFA Champions League, eight appearances and one goal in UEFA Cup) | 1 | 1 (Note: Appearance in Belgian Super Cup) | 0 | 46 | 9 |
| Standard Liège | 2009–10 | Belgian Pro League | 27 | 6 | 1 | 1 | — | | 12 (Note: Six appearances in UEFA Champions League, six appearances and three goals in UEFA Europa League) | 3 | 1 | 1 | 41 | 11 |
| Standard Liège | 2010–11 | Belgian Pro League | 37 | 10 | 6 | 2 | — | | — | | — | | 43 | 12 |
| Standard Liège | Total | | 148 | 33 | 7 | 3 | — | | 26 | 5 | 2 | 1 | 183 | 42 |
| Benfica | 2011–12 | Primeira Liga | 29 | 1 | 1 | 0 | 4 | 2 | 14 (Note: Appearances in UEFA Champions League) | 2 | — | | 49 | 5 |
| Benfica | 2012–13 | Primeira Liga | 3 | 0 | 0 | 0 | 0 | 0 | — | | — | | 3 | 0 |
| Benfica | Total | | 32 | 1 | 1 | 0 | 4 | 2 | 14 | 2 | — | | 52 | 5 |
| Zenit Saint Petersburg | 2012–13 | Russian Premier League | 19 | 4 | 3 | 0 | — | | 9 (Note: Five appearances in UEFA Champions League, four appearances and one goal in UEFA Europa League) | 1 | — | | 31 | 5 |
| Zenit Saint Petersburg | 2013–14 | Russian Premier League | 30 | 4 | 1 | 0 | — | | 11 | 0 | 1 (Note: Appearance in Russian Super Cup) | 0 | 43 | 4 |
| Zenit Saint Petersburg | 2014–15 | Russian Premier League | 28 | 4 | 1 | 0 | — | | 13 (Note: Seven appearances and one goal in UEFA Champions League, six appearances and one goal in UEFA Europa League) | 2 | — | | 42 | 6 |
| Zenit Saint Petersburg | 2015–16 | Russian Premier League | 29 | 3 | 4 | 2 | — | | 7 | 1 | 1 | 0 | 41 | 6 |
| Zenit Saint Petersburg | 2016–17 | Russian Premier League | 16 | 1 | 1 | 0 | — | | 6 (Note: Appearances in UEFA Europa League) | 0 | 0 | 0 | 23 | 1 |
| Zenit Saint Petersburg | Total | | 122 | 16 | 10 | 2 | — | | 46 | 4 | 2 | 0 | 180 | 22 |
| Tianjin Tianhai | 2017 | Chinese Super League | 27 | 4 | 2 | 0 | — | | — | | — | | 29 | 4 |
| Tianjin Tianhai | 2018 | Chinese Super League | 9 | 1 | 1 | 1 | — | | 8 (Note: Appearances in AFC Champions League) | 0 | — | | 18 | 2 |
| Tianjin Tianhai | Total | | 36 | 5 | 3 | 1 | — | | 8 | 0 | — | | 47 | 6 |
| Borussia Dortmund | 2018–19 | Bundesliga | 33 | 4 | 3 | 1 | — | | 7 | 1 | — | | 43 | 6 |
| Borussia Dortmund | 2019–20 | Bundesliga | 28 | 4 | 3 | 0 | — | | 7 | 0 | 1 (Note: Appearance in DFL-Supercup) | 0 | 39 | 4 |
| Borussia Dortmund | 2020–21 | Bundesliga | 15 | 0 | 2 | 0 | — | | 5 | 1 | 0 | 0 | 22 | 1 |
| Borussia Dortmund | 2021–22 | Bundesliga | 29 | 2 | 3 | 0 | — | | 8 (Note: Six appearances in UEFA Champions League, two appearances in UEFA Europa League) | 0 | 1 | 0 | 41 | 2 |
| Borussia Dortmund | Total | | 105 | 10 | 11 | 1 | — | | 27 | 2 | 2 | 0 | 145 | 13 |
| Atlético Madrid | 2022–23 | La Liga | 33 | 0 | 4 | 0 | — | | 6 | 0 | — | | 43 | 0 |
| Atlético Madrid | 2023–24 | La Liga | 35 | 2 | 5 | 0 | — | | 10 | 0 | 1 (Note: Appearance in Supercopa de España) | 0 | 51 | 2 |
| Atlético Madrid | 2024–25 | La Liga | 14 | 0 | 3 | 0 | — | | 4 | 0 | 1 (Note: Appearance in FIFA Club World Cup) | 1 | 22 | 1 |
| Atlético Madrid | Total | | 82 | 2 | 12 | 0 | — | | 20 | 0 | 2 | 1 | 116 | 3 |
| Girona | 2025–26 | La Liga | 32 | 1 | 0 | 0 | — | | — | | — | | 32 | 1 |
| Nice | 2026–27 | Ligue 1 | 6 | 0 | 0 | 0 | — | | — | | — | | 6 | 0 |
| Career total | | | 562 | 68 | 44 | 7 | 4 | 2 | 141 | 13 | 8 | 2 | 761 | 92 |

=== International ===
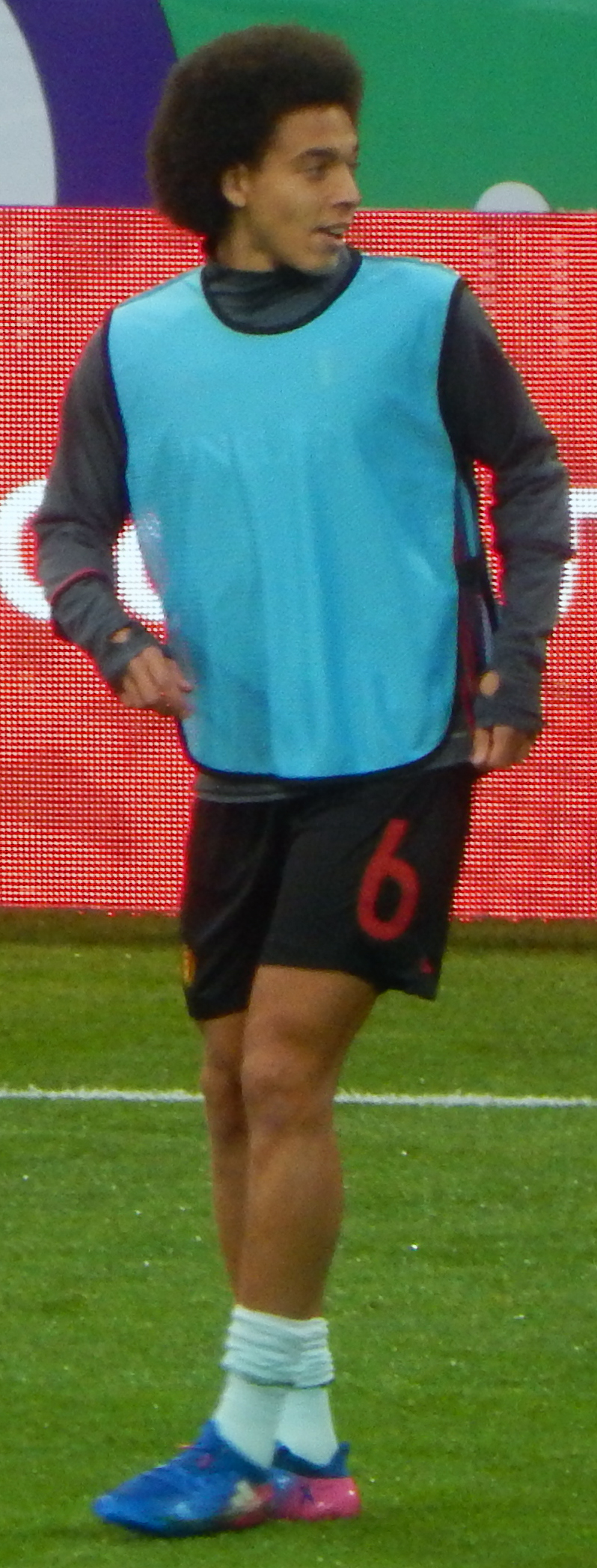
Witsel warming up on international duty, 2017

Appearances and goals by national team and year
| National team | Year | Apps | Goals |
|---|---|---|---|
| Belgium | 2008 | 7 | 1 |
| Belgium | 2009 | 3 | 1 |
| Belgium | 2010 | 5 | 0 |
| Belgium | 2011 | 11 | 3 |
| Belgium | 2012 | 9 | 0 |
| Belgium | 2013 | 10 | 0 |
| Belgium | 2014 | 11 | 1 |
| Belgium | 2015 | 9 | 0 |
| Belgium | 2016 | 15 | 2 |
| Belgium | 2017 | 7 | 1 |
| Belgium | 2018 | 13 | 0 |
| Belgium | 2019 | 5 | 0 |
| Belgium | 2020 | 5 | 1 |
| Belgium | 2021 | 10 | 1 |
| Belgium | 2022 | 10 | 1 |
| Belgium | 2023 | 0 | 0 |
| Belgium | 2024 | 2 | 0 |
| Belgium | 2025 | 2 | 0 |
| Belgium | 2026 | 6 | 0 |
| Total | | 140 | 12 |

Belgium score listed first, score column indicates score after each Witsel goal.

List of international goals scored by Axel Witsel
| No. | Date | Venue | Cap | Opponent | Score | Result | Competition | Ref. |
|---|---|---|---|---|---|---|---|---|
| 1 | 26 March 2008 | King Baudouin Stadium, Brussels, Belgium | 1 | Morocco | 1–2 | 1–4 | Friendly | |
| 2 | 17 November 2009 | Stade Louis Dugauguez, Sedan, France | 10 | Qatar | 1–0 | 2–0 | Friendly | |
| 3 | 9 February 2011 | Jules Ottenstadion, Ghent, Belgium | 16 | Finland | 1–0 | 1–1 | Friendly | |
| 4 | 25 March 2011 | Ernst-Happel-Stadion, Vienna, Austria | 17 | Austria | 1–0 | 2–0 | UEFA Euro 2012 qualification | |
| 5 | 25 March 2011 | Ernst-Happel-Stadion, Vienna, Austria | 17 | Austria | 2–0 | 2–0 | UEFA Euro 2012 qualification | |
| 6 | 4 September 2014 | Stade Maurice Dufrasne, Liège, Belgium | 52 | Australia | 2–0 | 2–0 | Friendly | |
| 7 | 18 June 2016 | Nouveau Stade de Bordeaux, Bordeaux, France | 69 | Republic of Ireland | 2–0 | 3–0 | UEFA Euro 2016 | |
| 8 | 10 October 2016 | Estádio Algarve, Faro/Loulé, Portugal | 76 | Gibraltar | 2–0 | 6–0 | 2018 FIFA World Cup qualification | |
| 9 | 31 August 2017 | Stade Maurice Dufrasne, Liège, Belgium | 81 | Gibraltar | 3–0 | 9–0 | 2018 FIFA World Cup qualification | |
| 10 | 8 September 2020 | King Baudouin Stadium, Brussels, Belgium | 107 | Iceland | 1–1 | 5–1 | 2020–21 UEFA Nations League A | |
| 11 | 2 September 2021 | Lilleküla Stadium, Tallinn, Estonia | 115 | Estonia | 4–1 | 5–2 | 2022 FIFA World Cup qualification | |
| 12 | 8 June 2022 | King Baudouin Stadium, Brussels, Belgium | 122 | Poland | 1–1 | 6–1 | 2022–23 UEFA Nations League A | |

== Honours ==
Standard Liège

- Belgian Pro League: 2007–08, 2008–09
- Belgian Cup: 2010–11
- Belgian Supercup: 2008, 2009

Benfica

- Taça da Liga: 2011–12

Zenit

- Russian Premier League: 2014–15
- Russian Cup: 2015–16
- Russian Super Cup: 2015

Borussia Dortmund

- DFB-Pokal: 2020–21
- DFL-Supercup: 2019

Belgium

- FIFA World Cup third place: 2018

Individual

- Belgian Young Footballer of the Year: 2007–08
- Belgian Golden Shoe: 2008
- O Jogo Team of the Year: 2012
- DH The Best Standard Liège Team Ever: 2020

== See also ==
- List of men's footballers with 100 or more international caps
