= Iohannis =

Iohannis is both a surname and a given name. Notable people with the name include:

== Given name ==
- Iohannis de Lignano, Italian jurist
- Iohannis de Serravalle, Italian Franciscan and humanist
- Iohannis Eckii, Latinized name of Johann Maier von Eck

== Surname ==
- Carmen Iohannis, first lady of Romania
- Klaus Iohannis, the fifth president of Romania

== See also ==
- Johannis (disambiguation)
- Ioannis
- Joannis
- Alternate forms for the name John
