= Ioannis =

Ioannis or Ioannes (Greek: Ιωάννης), shortened to Giannis or Yannis (Γιάννης) is a Greek given name cognate with Johannes and John, ultimately from Hebrew Yohanan. Notable people with the name include:

- Ioannis I, Tzimiskis, Byzantine Emperor
- Ioannis Agorastos-Plagis (John Plagis), Southern Rhodesian flying ace during World War II
- Ioannis Alevras, Greek politician who served as Speaker of the Hellenic Parliament
- Ioannis Altamouras, Greek painter of the 19th century
- Ioannis Anastassakis, professionally known as John Aniston, a Greek-born American actor
- Ioannis Andrianopoulos, Greek footballer and one of the founding members of football club Olympiacos CFP
- Ioannis Antetokounmpo, commonly known as Giannis Antetokounmpo, Greek basketball player
- Ioannis Apakas, Greek painter and priest in the latter part of the 16th century to the early 17th century
- Ioannis Argyropoulos, a lecturer, philosopher and humanist, one of the émigré Greek scholars who pioneered the revival of classical Greek learning in 15th-century Italy
- Ioannis Averoff, Greek economist and politician
- Ioannis Avramidis, Greek para athlete
- Ioannis Bourousis, Greek basketball player and member of Greece men's national basketball team that won the gold medal at EuroBasket 2005
- Ioannis Celivergos Zachos, Greek-American physician, literary scholar, elocutionist, author, lecturer, inventor, and educational pioneer
- Ioannis Chalkeus, a scholar, philosopher and figure of the modern Greek Enlightenment in the 18th century
- Ioannis Chryssomallis, known professionally as Yanni, a Greek-American composer, keyboardist, pianist, and music producer
- Ioannis Dalianidis, Greek film director
- Ioannis Demestichas, Greek Navy officer, known for his participation in the Macedonian Struggle under the nom de guerre of Kapetan Nikiforos
- Ioannis Doukas, Greek painter and one of the main representatives of the so-called 'Greek Munich School'
- Ioannis Dullardi, Flemish philosopher and logician
- Ioannis Filimon, 19th-century Greek historian, militant journalist and publisher
- Ioannis Frangoudis, Greek Army officer and athlete, who competed in the 1896 Summer Olympics in Athens as a shooter and became the only Greek athlete to win a gold, a silver and a bronze medal in a single Olympic
- Ioannis Gennadios, Greek diplomat, writer, and speaker, best known for his donation of his collection of Greek books and art to the Gennadius Library
- Ioannis Hadji Argyris, Greek pioneer of computer applications in science and engineering
- Ioannis Ioannidis, Greek basketball player, professional basketball coach, and politician
- Ioannis Kakridis (1901–1992), Greek classical scholar
- Ioannis Kalatzis, Greek singer
- Ioannis Kaminiates, Byzantine writer of the 10th century
- Ioannis Kapodistrias (John Capodistrias), Greek politician who served as the Foreign Minister of the Russian Empire and the first head of state of independent Greece
- Ioannis Karatzas, Phanariote Greek Prince of Wallachia
- Ioannis Kasoulidis, Cypriot politician
- Ioannis Kolettis (1773–1847), Greek politician who served as Prime Minister of Greece
- Ioannis Makriyannis, born Ioannis Triantaphyllou, Greek merchant, military officer, politician and author, best known today for his Memoirs
- Ioannis Metaxas, Greek general and politician
- Ioannis Okkas, Cypriot football player
- Ioannis Pangas, Greek philanthropist and businessman
- Ioannis Paraskevopoulos, Greek banker and politician
- Ioannis Papadiamantopoulos (1766–1826), Greek Merchant and revolutionary leader
- Ioannis Rallis, Greek politician
- Ioannis Samaras, Greek footballer
- Ioannis Smaragdis, Greek film director
- Ioannis Svoronos, Greek archaeologist and numismatist
- Ioannis Theofilakis, Greek shooter
- Ioannis Theotokis (1880–1961), Greek politician who became Prime Minister of Greece
- Ioannis Topalidis, Greek professional football manager and former player, assistant manager of the Greece national football team winning the UEFA Euro 2004 championship
- Ioannis Tsarouchis, Greek modernist painter and set designer
- Ioannis Varvakis, member of the Filiki Eteria and benefactor
- Ioannis Varoufakis, commonly known as Yanis Varoufakis, Greek-Australian economist and politician
- Ioannis Veliotes, commonly known as Johnny Otis, an American singer, musician, composer, arranger, bandleader, talent scout, disc jockey, record producer, television show host, artist, author, journalist, minister, and impresario
- Ioannis Xenakis, Greek-French avant-garde composer, music theorist, architect, performance director and engineer

== See also ==
- Agios Ioannis Rentis, Athens, Greece
- Iohannis
- Joannis
- Yannis
- Alternate forms for the name John
