= Olaus Johannis Gutho =

Swedish student and monk

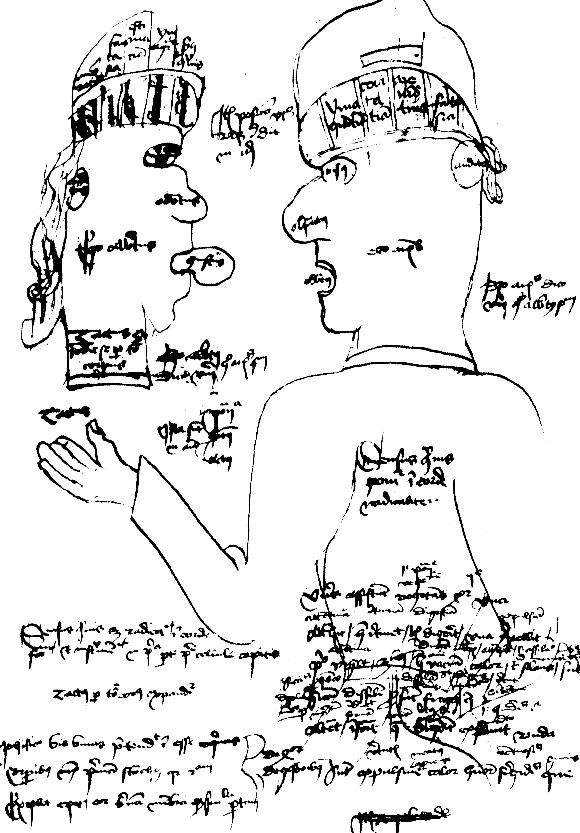
The notes of Olaus Johannis Gutho include this sketch of Aristotle and the medieval scholastic philosopher Albertus Magnus debating.

Olaus Johannis Gutho (died 1516) was a late 15th-century student at Uppsala University, whose preserved lecture notes are one of the few sources for the curriculum of the only mediaeval Swedish university.

== Biography ==
Olaus was a student at Uppsala University from its very first semester in 1477 until at least 1486, and later became a monk in the Brigittine Abbey of Vadstena. His name is a latinization of Olof Johansson or Olof Jonsson (or a similar form), with the byname indicating that he was from the island of Gotland. He is mentioned as a baccalaureus in artibus in an undated note, and was a magister artium by the time he entered the monastery in 1506. However, Olaus had not yet graduated as a baccalaureus in 1486, at the time of the last dated notes, which may be explained by his young age at the time of enrollment; students could enter university as young as seven or eight years old, but were not allowed to take the baccalaureate until the age of seventeen. Olaus died in 1516 during a visit to Poland.

When entering the monastery in 1506, Olaus was required to give up all his private possessions; the notes from lectures in Uppsala which he donated to the monastery library made up seven bound volumes. These were eventually returned to Uppsala along with the rest of the library after the dissolution of the Abbey of Vadstena in the late 16th century, and they now belong to the Uppsala University Library. The manuscripts (C 195, 242, 599, 600, 601, 602 and 627) were edited and published with an introduction by the Latinist Anders Piltz in his dissertation Studium Upsalense (1977).

The earliest notes cover theology, although Olaus started his studies in the Faculty of Philosophy in 1482. The notes show a strong emphasis on Aristotelian philosophy and the influence of Albertus Magnus and Thomas Aquinas that pervaded education in all universities in Europe at the time. His teachers included the theologians Ericus Olai, remembered for his chronicle Chronica regni gothorum, and Peder Galle, who later became known as one of the leading opponents of the Protestant Reformation in Sweden. The Uppsala curriculum also included Euclid's mathematics and the astronomy text De sphaera mundi by Johannes de Sacrobosco. The astronomy notes have influenced Uppsala astronomers to name an asteroid after him, 8869 Olausgutho, discovered in 1992.
