= Frédéric Dupré =

Belgian footballer

Personal information
- Date of birth: 12 May 1979 (age 47)
- Place of birth: Ghent, Belgium
- Height: 1.84 m (6 ft 1/2 in)
- Position: Defender

Youth career
- 1989–1998: KAA Gent

Senior career*
Years	Team	Apps	(Gls)
1999–2000	KAA Gent	10	(0)
2001–2002	Beringen-Heusden-Zolder	15	(0)
2002–2006	Zulte-Waregem	118	(15)
2006–2007	Standard Liège	40	(2)
2008–2010	Lokeren	57	(1)
2011	Waasland-Beveren		
2011–XXXX	Herleving Sinaai		

International career
- Belgium
- * Club domestic league appearances and goals

Frédéric Dupré (born 12 May 1979) is a Belgian football defender who last played for Herleving Sinaai. He played as a defender.

He started to play on his six years at Destelbergen FC. Four years later, he went to the youth teams of AA Gent. He was regularly selected in the national youth teams. In the season 1997/98, he was a part of the selection of AA Gent on his 18 years. This team rented him the next season to KSV Oudenaarde, the team in which he became the top scorer. The team promoted to Fourth Division after winning the final round. After this, he returned to Gent, and under the presidency of Trönd Sollied, he played eight times in the 1999/00-season.

When he was 21, Dupré played at SV Roeselare. The next season, he played at KVV Heusden-Zolder. In 2002, he was transferred for four years to SV Zulte-Waregem. In this team, he was champion in Second Division and he won the national Belgian Cup. He managed to get a transfer to Standard de Liège. Over there, he played a cup final (which was lost against Club Bruges) and he was national champion again. As from 2008, he played at Sporting Lokeren. On 23 October 2009, he was suspended by the team management, after a paper interview in which he accused the team management to be unprofessional. he had a contract in Lokeren until 2011, but this was terminated at the end of December 2010 after an injury. In his entire career, he was a two-times Red Devil.

== Career ==
season	team	country	league	games	goals
2000–2001	SV Roeselare	Belgium	Second Division Belgium	12	0
2001–2002	KVV Heusden-Zolder	Belgium	Second Division Belgium	9	0
2002–2003	Zulte Waregem	Belgium	Second Division Belgium	28	2
2003–2004	Zulte Waregem	Belgium	Second Division Belgium	27	2
2004–2005	Zulte Waregem	Belgium	Second Division Belgium	32	3
2005–2006	Zulte Waregem	Belgium	First Division Belgium	30	4
2006–2007	Standaard Luik	Belgium	First Division Belgium	29	2
2007–2008	Standaard Luik; Sporting Lokeren	Belgium	First Division Belgium	3; 14	0; 0
2008–2009	Sporting Lokeren	Belgium	First Division Belgium	20	1
2009–2010	Sporting Lokeren	Belgium	First Division Belgium	16	0
2010- nov	Sporting Lokeren	Belgium	First Division Belgium	0	0
2011- ...	KFC Herleving Sinaai	Belgium	Second Division Provincial series	62	15
			Totaal	192	25

== Golden Stud ==
January 2006, Dupré was selected in Humo's Gouden Stud (election of the most sexy soccer player in First Division). He finished second, after Jamaique Vandamme.

== Honours ==
Zulte Waregem

- Belgian Cup: 2005–06
