= Johannis =

Johannis may refer to:

- Johannis Winar (born 1970), Indonesian basketball coach and former player
- Klaus Johannis (born 1959), Romanian teacher and politician
- Olaus Johannis Gutho (died 1516), Bridgettine monk
- the Johannis or Iohannis, a Latin epic poem in honour of John Troglita, by Flavius Cresconius Corippus

== See also ==
- St. Johannis (disambiguation)
- Johannis L. Van Alen Farm
