= Joannis Vislicensis =

Joannis Vislicensis (Belarusian: Ян Ві́сьліцкі, Jan Vislicki; Polish: Jan z Wiślicy, Jan from Wiślica; c. 1485/90–1520) was a medieval author of epic poetry in the Grand Duchy of Lithuania and Kingdom of Poland, a representative of the Polish-Latin branch of poetry.

== Biography ==
There is virtually no biographical information about Joannis beyond his poetic works and related correspondence with his teacher, Pavel the Ruthenian, and most of biographical details are uncertain or deduced indirectly. From his letter to Pavel the Ruthenian one may deduce he was a Pole (he called Poland his motherland: "patriae Poloniae cuius alumnum me fore profiteor") From his agnomen it is deduced he was born in a Wislica/Vislitsa. Polish historians consider Wiślica in Poland to be his birthplace. Belarusian historians claim Joannis Vislicensis was born in the Belarusian territory (then within the Grand Duchy of Lithuania), between Kletsk and Pinsk by the river Vislitsa.

Joannis Vislicensis studied at the University of Kraków, His teacher of literature was Pavel from Krosno alias Rusin ("Pavel the Ruthenian"). Some historians claim he received a bachelor's degree in 1505 or 1506 and a Master of Fine Arts degree in 1510. In 1510–1512, Joannis Vislicensis taught Aristotle's philosophy, Euclid's mathematics and Cicero's rhetoric classes to students. Some historians (e.g., Bronisław Kruczkiewicz and Henryk Barycz) doubt his scholarly credentials and claim that the scholarly degrees and extraneus non de facultate teachership belong to another Jan from Wislica, the name indeed appearing in Liber Promotionum. Kruczkiewich argues that otherwise Joannis would have added his academic title to his name with the poem, the way his teacher Pavel habitually did, since this would have been important for the promotion of the first book by a new poet. Kruczkiewich, comparing the dates, also raises doubts that a successful master [Jan of Wislica II] would drop his occupation and start anew studies in literature with Pavel the Ruthenian.

He began writing epigrams to his friends, he also wrote an ode to Konstanty Ostrogski who was a commander in the well-known Battle of Orsha in 1514. Joannis Vislicensis' best-known work is his poem The Prussian War [Bellum Prutenum] (1516). He also wrote Ode to the King Sigismund, Elegy to the Blessed Virgin Mary, Epigram on the Envious.

== The Prussian War ==
The poem consists of 1,300 verses in hexameter divided into three parts, or three books, according to the terminology of that time:

- The first part is a poetic prelude, the exposition of the heroic epics, addressing the gods of Olympus and Calliope, muse of the epic poetry, in order to ask for an inspiration to glorify the king and the Grand Duke Sigismund I the Old, his grandfather Jogaila and the Jagiellon dynasty. Metaphorically Vislicensis calls them "the kings of Sarmats", implying the Sarmatian origin of the Slavic nations.
- The second part is described by the author as a "history of Lithuania, telling about the great nation where Jogaila came from". It describes the history of the Old Prussians, their conquest by the Teutonic Knights, the preparation and the fighting of the Battle of Grunwald (1410). As a source of historical knowledge Vislicensis used The History of Poland by Johannes Dlugossius, letters of Jogaila, legends and historicized narratives. Describing wars Vislicensis used the experience of the ancient poetry, imitation of the pagan mythology, creating specific images. Thus, "the gifts of Ceres" means "grain crops", "Severe Mars has risen" means "the war has started".
- The third part of the poem is dedicated to the marriage of Jogaila to Sophia Galshanska. Vislicensis describes the Duchess as "the most beautiful girl in the world", who is even more beautiful than Greek goddesses and nymphs.

== Translations ==
The only original copy of The Prussian War is kept in the Jagiellon Library in Kraków. In 1887 the original copy in Latin was reprinted with Bronisław Kruczkiewicz's comments, also in Latin. In 1874 Władysław Syrokomla translated a part of the poem into Polish. In 1880 Karol Mecherzyński wrote a work on Joannis Vislicensis in which he quoted some verses from The Prussian War. A full translation of the poem appeared in Polish in 1932 in Lwów. In 2006, the poem was translated into Belarusian by Zhanna Nekrashevich-Karotka. The texts in the book are printed both in Latin and Belarusian.
