= St. Johannis =

St. Johannis is a common name for several churches in Germany dedicated to or named after Johannes (St. John):

- St. Johannis, Ansbach
- St. Johannis Harvestehude Hamburg
- Neustädter Hof- und Stadtkirche St. Johannis zu Hannover
- St. Johannis, Lüneburg

It is also the name of a part of Nuremberg.
