= L. Adrien Hannus =

American professor of anthropology

L. Adrien Hannus (born 1944) is a retired American professor of anthropology and the former director of the Archeology Laboratory at Augustana University in Sioux Falls, South Dakota. He is also the editor of the journal “South Dakota Archaeology,” a member of the scientific boards for the Mammoth Site in Hot Springs, South Dakota, leads the scientific team at the Mitchell Prehistoric Indian Village in Mitchell, South Dakota, and is an adjunct professor at the University of Exeter in Exeter, England. He recently participated as lead archaeologist on the first season of the PBS television series Time Team America. Since 2003, Hannus has annually co-directed summer field school excavations at the Mitchell Prehistoric Indian Village with Dr. Alan K. Outram of the University of Exeter in Exeter, England.

== Early life ==
Hannus was born in Wichita, Kansas.

== Education and research ==
Hannus took a B.A. in Psychology and Political Science from Wichita State University in 1965, an M.A. in Cultural Anthropology from Wichita State University in 1972, and a PhD from the University of Utah in 1983. His doctoral dissertation detailed the excavations of the Lange/Ferguson Clovis mammoth kill and butchery site in the White River Badlands of South Dakota Hannus’ work at the Lange/Ferguson site, dating to more than 11,000 years ago, provided the first evidence of Clovis period flaked bone tools. Hannus’ work has been published in journals such as American Antiquity and Plains Anthropologist. His work also appears in a number of edited volumes. Additionally, Hannus has participated in numerous conferences, including the American Anthropological Association Annual Meetings, The Plains Conference, The Midwest Anthropological Conference, The International Conference on Bone Modification, The World Archaeological Conference, and many others. Dr Hannus currently serves as a professor of Anthropology at Augustana College where he has recently overseen the creation of an undergraduate major in Anthropology. Dr. Hannus has directed work at many important archaeological sites on the Northern Plains, including the Ray Long site (the Angostura type site) in southwestern South Dakota, the Westhorse Creek quarry site in the White River Badlands of South Dakota, the Crow Creek site in central South Dakota, and the Mitchell Prehistoric Indian Village in Mitchell, South Dakota, as well as international work in Egypt, France, Mexico, and the United Kingdom. His research interests include the Paleo-Indian period in North America, Clovis culture, and the peopling of the New World.

== Publicity and impact ==
Hannus recently participated in the first season of the PBS series Time Team America, an adaptation of a popular British television program. He was involved in excavations at The Lost Colony on Roanoke Island, North Carolina, the Topper site on the Savannah River, South Carolina, the site of New Philadelphia in Illinois, the Range Creek complex in southern Utah, and the Fort James site in South Dakota.
