= Artyom Roshchin =

Russian footballer

Personal information
- Full name: Artyom Vadimovich Roshchin
- Date of birth: 12 January 1993 (age 33)
- Place of birth: Kimry, Russia
- Height: 1.75 m (5 ft 9 in)
- Position: Forward

Senior career*
Years	Team	Apps	(Gls)
2012–2015	FC Volga Tver	55	(16)
2016	FC Fakel Voronezh	8	(0)
2017–2018	SSh Volna Dubna		
- * Club domestic league appearances and goals

Artyom Vadimovich Roshchin (Russian: Артём Вади́мович Ро́щин; born 12 January 1993) is a Russian former football forward.

== Club career ==
He made his debut in the Russian Second Division for FC Volga Tver on 23 July 2012 in a game against FC Tekstilshchik Ivanovo.

He made his Russian Football National League debut for FC Fakel Voronezh on 16 March 2016 in a game against FC Luch-Energiya Vladivostok.
