= Giannis Chondrogiannis =

- Born: c. 1761; Mazeika, Ottoman Empire (now Kleitoria, Greece)
- Died: 1835; Greece
- Occupation: Greek revolutionary leader

Giannis Chondrogiannis or Hondrogiannis (Greek: Γιάννης Χοντρογιάννης; c. 1761–1835) was a Greek revolutionary of the Greek War of Independence and a politician. He also worked as the bodyguard of Asimakis Zaimis, an influential Greek revolutionary and politician.

== Biography ==
The leading figures of the Greek War of Independence had scheduled the Greek Revolution for March 25; however, without them knowing it, on March 15, 1821, Chondrogiannis asked permission from the revolutionary Asimakis Zaimis to ambush Ottoman tax collector Seidis Laliotis, Greek banker Nikolaos Tampakopoulos, and his secretary Nikolaos Giannakopoulos at Chelonospilia, a place at the village Lykouria, near Kalavryta, in order to confiscate the money they were transferring to Tripolis.

The next day, Chondrogiannis and his six children attacked the Turkish delegation, but failed to capture or inflict harm on Seidis and Tampakopoulos, who escaped. Among the ones they managed to capture was Giannakopoulos, from whom they took some money belonging to Tampakopoulos; they handed the confiscated sum over to Zaimis, who used it to fund revolutionary causes.

Soon, the story circulated among the local Ottoman Turks who came to believe that the Revolution had started and subsequently begun fortifying themselves in the castles of Patras, Aigio and Kalavryta. Seeing that the Ottomans had initiated the fortification process, the Greeks started the Revolution earlier than they had originally planned.

After the Revolution, Giannakopoulos filed a lawsuit against Chondrogiannis demanding that he received a compensation as a victim of robbery. The court accepted the accusations. Although the money Chondrogiannis stole had been given to the leaders of the Revolution, and were managed exclusively by them, all of Chondrogiannis' property was confiscated; he was convicted of robbery and imprisoned at Bourtzi, Nafplion.

After the conviction of their father and the verdict pertaining to the confiscation of his property, Chondrogiannis' children resorted to crime so as to survive; although many appeals for pardon and amnesty were made by the Chondrogiannis family, the newly established Greek State eventually arrested and executed all six of them. Another man who had helped Chondrogiannis steal Tampakopoulos' money, Petiotis, was not prosecuted, despite his involvement.

== The Chondrogiannis family ==
The Chondroyannos surname is believed to have been incorporated during the period of Ottoman rule in Greece (14th to 19th centuries). As is often dictated by Greek custom, the forenames of family members are passed on from preceding generations. Additionally, traditional Greek Orthodox/Christian forenames are common within the Chondroyannos lineage.

Chondroyannos is a family name of lineage most commonly associated to members of the Greek diaspora from the Dodecanese region of Greece. Prior to taking root in the Dodecanese, family members resided in Asia Minor (present day, western coastal Turkey) for what is believed to have been centuries before a massive population exchange between Greece and Turkey; which took place in the early 20th century. In accordance with the stipulations of the Treaty of Lausanne, the Chondroyannos family, along with an estimated 1,500,000 Greeks, were forcibly relocated within the area of Greece's then newly defined boundary. Later in the same century, only a small number from the clan established themselves in communities outside Greece (Canada and the United States of America are known). The surname was transliterated during the family's migration from Greece to produce the Latin phonetic spelling. The original Greek name is known to be shared by Hellenes in other regions of Greek society.

When translating, today's Hellenes of Greece and Europeans who have the surname Chondroyannos more commonly spell the name using a shallow orthographic method, relating each Greek letter to a corresponding letter in the Latin alphabet. This literal translation of the surname Chondroyannos thus becomes Hondrogiannos or Hondrogiannis.
