= Yanis Papassarantis =

Belgian footballer

Personal information
- Date of birth: 11 May 1988 (age 38)
- Place of birth: Charleroi, Belgium
- Height: 1.83 m (6 ft 0 in)
- Position: Attacking midfielder

Youth career
- 1996–2001: Charleroi
- 2001–2004: Anderlecht
- 2004–2006: Standard Liège

Senior career*
Years	Team	Apps	(Gls)
2006–2008	Standard Liège	1	(0)
2008–2010	Roeselare	7	(0)
2010–2011	Union SG	52	(15)
2012	Tienen	10	(1)
2012–2014	Dender EH	63	(12)
2014	Union SG	11	(0)
2015	UR La Louvière Centre	20	(5)
2016–	CS Grevenmacher	7	(0)
- * Club domestic league appearances and goals as of 4 January 2016

Yanis Papassarantis (Greek: Γιάννης Παπασαράντης; born 12 March 1988, in Charleroi) is a Belgian football player.

== Career ==
The left midfielder of Greek origin previously played for Roeselare, Standard Liège, Anderlecht, Charleroi and Tienen, but had his most successful period with Union SG, where he scored 15 goals in 52 matches.
