= Yannis Margaritis =

Greek theatre director

Yannis Margaritis (Greek: Γιάννης Μαργαρίτης) is a Greek theatre director, perhaps best known for his presentation of the play Electra.

Margaritis is the son of Niki Kypreou and Alkis Margaritis. He is currently married to Chrysanthi Douzi and has a daughter, Semeli-Niki.

In 1987 he made his Epidaurus directorial debut with the National Theatre being the youngest-ever director performing at the ancient theatre. He was 31.

He is the co-founder of Spring Theatre, Το Θέατρο της Άνοιξης.
