= List of Belgian football transfers summer 2008 =

This is a list of Belgian football transfers for the 2008 summer transfer window. Only transfers involving a team from the Jupiler League are listed.

== Sorted by date ==
=== January 2008 ===
Date	Name	Moving from	Moving to	Fee
17 January 2008	Bernt Evens	Westerlo	Club Brugge	Undisclosed
24 January 2008	Vincent Provoost	Kortrijk	Roeselare	Undisclosed

=== February 2008 ===
Date	Name	Moving from	Moving to	Fee
6 February 2008	(Netherlands) Arnold Kruiswijk	(Netherlands) Groningen	Anderlecht	Undisclosed

=== March 2008 ===
Date	Name	Moving from	Moving to	Fee
15 March 2008	(France) Christophe Copel	UR Namur	Dender	Undisclosed
16 March 2008	Steve Colpaert	Brussels	Zulte-Waregem	Free
17 March 2008	Stijn Van Der Kelen	Gent	Zulte-Waregem	Undisclosed
19 March 2008	Sébastien Phiri	Brussels	Gent	Undisclosed
22 March 2008	Thierry Berghmans	Tubize	Willebroek-Meerhof	Undisclosed
25 March 2008	(Egypt) Ahmed Hassan	Anderlecht	(Egypt) Al Ahly	Undisclosed
28 March 2008	Giuseppe Rossini	(Netherlands) Utrecht	Mechelen	Undisclosed
31 March 2008	Kevin Stuckens	Tubize	Woluwe-Zaventem	Undisclosed

=== April 2008 ===
Date	Name	Moving from	Moving to	Fee
3 April 2008	(Brazil) Gustavo Tormena	(Brazil) Juventude	Germinal Beerschot	Undisclosed
6 April 2008	(Sierra Leone) Paul Kpaka	Roeselare	Germinal Beerschot	Undisclosed
9 April 2008	(Colombia) Juan Pablo Pino	Charleroi	(France) AS Monaco	Loan Ended
18 April 2008	Lens Annab	Eisden Sport	Westerlo	Undisclosed
19 April 2008	(Brazil) Kanu	(Brazil) Barueri	Anderlecht	Undisclosed
21 April 2008	Wouter Biebauw	Roeselare	Mechelen	Free
21 April 2008	Joos Valgaeren	Club Brugge	(Netherlands) Emmen	Free
23 April 2008	Bart Goossens	Hamme	Roeselare	Undisclosed
27 April 2008	Steve Dugardein	Mouscron	Oud-Heverlee Leuven	Free
29 April 2008	Björn De Wilde	Unattached	Roeselare	Free
30 April 2008	Thomas Matton	Oud-Heverlee Leuven	Zulte-Waregem	Undisclosed
30 April 2008	(Serbia) Đorđe Svetličić	Gent	Germinal Beerschot	Undisclosed

=== May 2008 ===
Date	Name	Moving from	Moving to	Fee
1 May 2008	Jo Coppens	Genk	Cercle Brugge	Undisclosed
2 May 2008	(Argentina) Matías Suárez	(Argentina) Belgrano	Anderlecht	€1.2m
3 May 2008	Bart Van den Eede	Westerlo	Dender	Undisclosed
3 May 2008	Tom Van Mol	Cercle Brugge	FCN Sint-Niklaas	Undisclosed
6 May 2008	Christophe Lepoint	Tubize	Mouscron	Undisclosed
6 May 2008	(Burkina Faso) Saidou Panandétiguiri	Lokeren	(Germany) SV Wehen Wiesbaden	Undisclosed
7 May 2008	(Ivory Coast) Bassalia Sakanoko	Péruwelz	Mouscron	Undisclosed
8 May 2008	(France) Karim Belhocine	Virton	Kortrijk	Free
9 May 2008	Bart Deelkens	Beveren	Westerlo	Undisclosed
9 May 2008	Nicolas Timmermans	Kortrijk	Westerlo	Undisclosed
10 May 2008	(France) David Grondin	Mouscron	Mechelen	Free
12 May 2008	Jonathan Bourdon	Couillet	Roeselare	Undisclosed
13 May 2008	Marc Wagemakers	Westerlo	Sint-Truiden	Free
14 May 2008	(Tunisia) Anis Boussaidi	Mechelen	(Austria) Salzburg	Loan Ended
14 May 2008	(Venezuela) Ronald Vargas	(Venezuela) Caracas	Club Brugge	Undisclosed
15 May 2008	(France) Nasser Daineche	(France) Istres	Roeselare	Undisclosed
15 May 2008	(France) Boubacar Dembele	(France) Beauvais	Roeselare	Undisclosed
16 May 2008	Siebe Blondelle	(Netherlands) Vitesse Arnhem	Dender	Free
16 May 2008	(The Gambia) Mustapha Jarju	Lierse	Mons	Undisclosed
16 May 2008	Thomas Troch	Aalst	Roeselare	Undisclosed
17 May 2008	(Serbia) Nemanja Rnić	(Serbia) Partizan	Anderlecht	Undisclosed
18 May 2008	(Algeria) Adlène Guedioura	(France) Créteil	Kortrijk	Undisclosed
18 May 2008	(The Gambia) Ebrahim Savaneh	Beveren	Kortrijk	Undisclosed
20 May 2008	(France) Mamadou Diakité	(France) Metz	Mouscron	Undisclosed
20 May 2008	(Morocco) Nabil Dirar	Westerlo	Club Brugge	Undisclosed
20 May 2008	Jérôme van der Zijl	Lierse	Mons	Undisclosed
21 May 2008	Charly Konstantinidis	Mons	(Cyprus) Nea Salamis	Undisclosed
21 May 2008	Benoît Ladrière	La Louvière	Gent	Undisclosed
22 May 2008	(Argentina) Gustavo Colman	Germinal Beerschot	(Turkey) Trabzonspor	Undisclosed
22 May 2008	Chemcedine El Araichi	Roeselare	Mouscron	Undisclosed
22 May 2008	Tim Vleminckx	Germinal Beerschot	Hamme	Undisclosed
22 May 2008	(Poland) Marcin Żewłakow	Gent	(Cyprus) APOEL Nicosia	Free
23 May 2008	(Ukraine) Oleksandr Iakovenko	Genk	Anderlecht	Undisclosed ^{1}
23 May 2008	Yannick Thoelen	Geel	Mechelen	Undisclosed
24 May 2008	Rubin Dantschotter	Cercle Brugge	Beveren	Loan
24 May 2008	Jasper Vermeerbergen	Germinal Beerschot	Beveren	Undisclosed
24 May 2008	(Iceland) Arnar Viðarsson	(Netherlands) Twente	Cercle Brugge	Undisclosed
25 May 2008	Frederik Declercq	Kortrijk	Deinze	Undisclosed
25 May 2008	(Nigeria) Emmanuel Okoduwa	Germinal Beerschot	(Ukraine) Dynamo Kyiv	Undisclosed
25 May 2008	Luigi Pieroni	Anderlecht	(France) Nantes	Loan Ended
26 May 2008	(Senegal) Khalilou Fadiga	Gent	Germinal Beerschot	Undisclosed
26 May 2008	(Brazil) Fred	Standard Liège	Dender	Undisclosed
26 May 2008	(Bosnia and Herzegovina) Sulejman Smajić	(Bosnia and Herzegovina) Zrinjski Mostar	Dender	Undisclosed
27 May 2008	Garry de Graef	(Germany) SC Paderborn 07	Lierse	Free
27 May 2008	(France) Frédéric Dindeleux	Zulte-Waregem	Oostende	Free
27 May 2008	Timothy Dreesen	Club Brugge	Lierse	Loan ^{2}
27 May 2008	Arne Nilis	Genk	(Netherlands) PSV Eindhoven	Undisclosed
28 May 2008	Nathan D'Haemers	Zulte-Waregem	Beveren	Undisclosed
28 May 2008	Kevin Kempeneer	Mechelen	Waasland	Undisclosed
28 May 2008	(Rwanda) Jimmy Mulisa	Hamme	Roeselare	Undisclosed
29 May 2008	Michaël Wiggers	Mons	Dender	Undisclosed
30 May 2008	(France) Franck Berrier	(France) Cannes	Zulte-Waregem	Undisclosed
30 May 2008	Miguel Dachelet	Standard Liège	Zulte-Waregem	Undisclosed
30 May 2008	Geert De Vlieger	Zulte-Waregem	Club Brugge	Undisclosed
30 May 2008	(Peru) José Carlos Fernández	(Ukraine) FC Chornomorets	Cercle Brugge	Undisclosed
30 May 2008	(Denmark) Brian Priske	Club Brugge	(Denmark) Vejle	Undisclosed
31 May 2008	(Croatia) Ivica Džidić	(Bosnia and Herzegovina) Zrinjski Mostar	Mons	Undisclosed

Notes:

- ^{1} Iakovenko was already on loan to Anderlecht since January 2008. Anderlecht used the option in the contract to buy him.
- ^{2} Dreesen was on loan to Sint-Truiden, now loaned to Lierse.

=== June 2008 ===
Date	Name	Moving from	Moving to	Fee
2 June 2008	Yves Vanderhaeghe	Roeselare	Kortrijk	End of Career ^{3}
3 June 2008	Sven De Volder	Club Brugge	Mouscron	Undisclosed
4 June 2008	Bartholomeo Ferrara	(France) Sochaux	Germinal Beerschot	Undisclosed
4 June 2008	(Algeria) Khaled Kharroubi	(France) Valenciennes	Dender	Undisclosed
4 June 2008	Sven Kums	Anderlecht	Kortrijk	Undisclosed ^{4}
4 June 2008	(Argentina) Hernán Losada	Germinal Beerschot	Anderlecht	Undisclosed
4 June 2008	(Rwanda) Henri Munyaneza	Dender	Germinal Beerschot	Undisclosed
4 June 2008	(France) Cyril Théréau	Anderlecht	Charleroi	Undisclosed ^{5}
5 June 2008	(Finland) Janne Hietanen	(France) Troyes	Roeselare	Undisclosed
5 June 2008	(Hungary) Dániel Tőzsér	(Greece) AEK Athens	Genk	Undisclosed
6 June 2008	(Croatia) Nikica Jelavić	Zulte-Waregem	(Austria) Rapid Wien	Loan
7 June 2008	Sébastien Dufoor	Roeselare	Tienen	Undisclosed ^{6}
7 June 2008	Steven Jacobs	(Germany) Borussia Mönchengladbach	Dender	Undisclosed
9 June 2008	(France) Cédric Bétrémieux	Kortrijk	Roeselare	Undisclosed
10 June 2008	(Brazil) João Carlos	Lokeren	Genk	Undisclosed
11 June 2008	(France) Wilfried Dalmat	Mons	Standard Liège	Undisclosed
11 June 2008	(Slovakia) Adam Nemec	(Germany) Erzgebirge Aue	Genk	Undisclosed
11 June 2008	(Ivory Coast) Cheik Tioté	Anderlecht	(Netherlands) Twente	€2.5m ^{7}
12 June 2008	Issame Charaï	Mechelen	Sint-Truiden	Undisclosed
12 June 2008	Daan Vaesen	Roeselare	Sint-Truiden	Undisclosed
13 June 2008	(Israel) Avi Strool	(Israel) Maccabi Netanya	Lokeren	Undisclosed
14 June 2008	Laurent Ciman	Charleroi	Club Brugge	Undisclosed
14 June 2008	(United States) Jared Jeffrey	(United States) Dallas Texans	Club Brugge	Undisclosed
14 June 2008	(Peru) Johan Sotil	(Peru) José Gálvez	Westerlo	Undisclosed
15 June 2008	(Ivory Coast) Alexandre Tokpa	Beveren	Roeselare	Free
17 June 2008	Jean-Philippe Charlet	Mouscron	Brussels	Undisclosed
18 June 2008	(Brazil) William Xavier Barbosa	(Brazil) Botafogo	Kortrijk	Undisclosed
18 June 2008	Mark De Man	Anderlecht	(Netherlands) Roda JC	Undisclosed
18 June 2008	Gil Servaes	Dender	Anderlecht	Free
19 June 2008	Sébastien Chabaud	Germinal Beerschot	Charleroi	Undisclosed
20 June 2008	(Germany) Markus Neumayr	(Germany) MSV Duisburg	Zulte-Waregem	Free
21 June 2008	(North Macedonia) Ertan Demiri	(North Macedonia) Rabotnički	Lokeren	Undisclosed
23 June 2008	Gaëtan Englebert	Club Brugge	(France) Tours	Undisclosed
23 June 2008	(France) Benjamin Nicaise	Mons	Standard Liège	Undisclosed
23 June 2008	Gunter Van Handenhoven	(Qatar) Al-Ahli	Roeselare	Free
23 June 2008	Jo Vermast	(Netherlands) MVV	Kortrijk	Undisclosed
24 June 2008	(Czech Republic) Štěpán Kučera	Club Brugge	(Czech Republic) Sparta Prague	Loan
24 June 2008	Birger Maertens	Club Brugge	(Netherlands) Heracles	Free
24 June 2008	Joachim Mununga	Tubize	Mechelen	Undisclosed
24 June 2008	Glenn Verbauwhede	Club Brugge	Kortrijk	Loan
25 June 2008	(Bahrain) Jesse John	(Bahrain) Muharraq Club	Mouscron	Undisclosed
25 June 2008	(France) Tristan Lahaye	(France) Amiens	Kortrijk	Undisclosed
27 June 2008	Vittorio Villano	Standard Liège	Tubize	Undisclosed
29 June 2008	Mbo Mpenza	Anderlecht	(Greece) AEL	Free
30 June 2008	Alan Haydock	Brussels	Tubize	Undisclosed

Notes:

- ^{3} Vanderhaeghe ends his career as a footballer and becomes assistant-coach under Hein Vanhaezebrouck at Kortrijk.
- ^{4} Kums was already on loan to Kortrijk since January 2008. Kortrijk used the option in the contract to buy him.
- ^{5} Théréau was already on loan to Charleroi, now bought.
- ^{6} Dufoor was on loan to Dender, now sold to Tienen.
- ^{7} Tioté was on loan to Roda JC, now sold to Twente.

=== July 2008 ===
Date	Name	Moving from	Moving to	Fee
1 July 2008	Thomas Buffel	(Scotland) Rangers	Cercle Brugge	Undisclosed
1 July 2008	(Spain) Chapi	(Spain) Deportivo La Coruña	Zulte-Waregem	Free
1 July 2008	Rocky Peeters	Sint-Truiden	Germinal Beerschot	Undisclosed
1 July 2008	(Czech Republic) Daniel Pudil	(Czech Republic) Slovan Liberec	Genk	Undisclosed ^{8}
3 July 2008	(Morocco) Mouhcine Iajour	(Switzerland) Chiasso	Charleroi	Undisclosed
3 July 2008	(France) Zahir Zerdab	(France) Reims	Zulte-Waregem	Undisclosed
4 July 2008	Dieter Wittesaele	Gent	Dender	Undisclosed
5 July 2008	Arnaud Sutchuin	Brussels	Anderlecht	Free
7 July 2008	(France) Cédric Collet	(France) Brest	Mons	Undisclosed
8 July 2008	(Serbia) Slobodan Slović	Cercle Brugge	Antwerp	Free ^{9}
9 July 2008	(France) Grégory Christ	Charleroi	(Germany) MSV Duisburg	Loan
9 July 2008	(Colombia) Jaime Alfonso Ruiz	(Peru) Alianza Lima	Westerlo	Undisclosed
11 July 2008	Grégory Delwarte	Tournai	Mons	Undisclosed
11 July 2008	(Brazil) Adriano Duarte	Mons	Gent	Undisclosed
11 July 2008	Yannick Vervalle	(Greece) Ilisiakos	Tubize	Undisclosed
13 July 2008	(Brazil) Thiago	(Brazil) Rio Claro	Tubize	Undisclosed
13 July 2008	(Brazil) Rafael Santiago	unclear	Tubize	Undisclosed
14 July 2008	(Senegal) Cheikhou Kouyaté	Brussels	Anderlecht	Undisclosed
15 July 2008	(Croatia) Tomislav Mikulić	(Croatia) Dinamo Zagreb	Standard Liège	Undisclosed
15 July 2008	(Ivory Coast) Bertin Tomou	Mouscron	Westerlo	Undisclosed
16 July 2008	Faris Haroun	Genk	Germinal Beerschot	Undisclosed
17 July 2008	Frank Boeckx	Sint-Truiden	Gent	Undisclosed
17 July 2008	(France) Alexandre Martinovic	Gent	Dender	Loan
18 July 2008	(Nigeria) Joseph Akpala	Charleroi	Club Brugge	Undisclosed
18 July 2008	(France) Julien Gorius	Brussels	KV Mechelen	Undisclosed
18 July 2008	Kevin Oris	KVSK United	Mons	Undisclosed
18 July 2008	(France) Vincent Ramaël	(France) AS Monaco	Tubize	Loan
19 July 2008	(Israel) Barak Yitzhaki	Genk	(Israel) Beitar Jerusalem	Undisclosed
24 July 2008	(Ghana) Salou Ibrahim	Club Brugge	(Germany) MSV Duisburg	Undisclosed
28 July 2008	(Netherlands) Sergio Hellings	(England) Leicester City	Westerlo	Free
30 July 2008	(United States) Patrick Lane	(United States) LMU	Cercle Brugge	Undisclosed
30 July 2008	Kevin Vandenbergh	(Netherlands) Utrecht	Germinal Beerschot	Loan
30 July 2008	(Israel) Gil Vermuth	Gent	(Israel) Hapoel Tel Aviv	Undisclosed
31 July 2008	(Ivory Coast) Marco Né	Free Agent	Germinal Beerschot	Free

- ^{8} Pudil was on loan to Slavia Prague, now sold to Genk.
- ^{9} Slović was on loan to Antwerp, contract was now ended and Antwerp signed him for free on 22 July.

=== August 2008 ===
Date	Name	Moving from	Moving to	Fee
1 August 2008	(Croatia) Josip Barišić	(Croatia) Segesta	Tubize	Undisclosed
1 August 2008	(Nigeria) Osahon Eboigbe	Cercle Brugge	OH Leuven	Loan
1 August 2008	Jason Vandelannoite	(Turkey) Bursaspor	Tubize	Undisclosed
4 August 2008	(Croatia) Leon Benko	(Germany) 1. FC Nürnberg	Standard Liège	Undisclosed
5 August 2008	(France) Kamulete Makiese	(France) Lille	Charleroi	Loan
6 August 2008	(France) Thomas Phibel	Standard Liège	Brussels	Loan
7 August 2008	(Switzerland) Danijel Subotić	(England) Portsmouth	Zulte Waregem	Loan
9 August 2008	(Morocco) Tarik Bendamou	(Morocco) Marrakech	Charleroi	Free
9 August 2008	(Morocco) Abdessalam Benjelloun	(Scotland) Hibernian	Charleroi	Loan
10 August 2008	Vincenzo Verhoeven	Germinal Beerschot	Hamme	Undisclosed
13 August 2008	(Brazil) Digão	(Italy) Milan	Standard Liège	Loan
13 August 2008	(Cameroon) Sébastien Siani	Anderlecht	Sint-Truiden	Loan^{10}
16 August 2008	(Turkey) Serhat Akın	Anderlecht	(Turkey) Kocaelispor	Free
18 August 2008	Lander Van Steenbrugghe	Zulte Waregem	OH Leuven	Loan
19 August 2008	Roland Lamah	Anderlecht	(France) Le Mans	€3.5m
20 August 2008	(Russia) Dmitri Bulykin	(Germany) Bayer 04 Leverkusen	Anderlecht	Undisclosed
21 August 2008	(France) Romain Beynié	(France) Lyon	Tubize	Loan
22 August 2008	Andrea Mbuyi-Mutombo	(England) Portsmouth	Zulte Waregem	Loan
29 August 2008	(Algeria) Mansour Boutabout	(France) Angers	Kortrijk	Undisclosed
29 August 2008	Silvio Proto	Anderlecht	Germinal Beerschot	Loan
29 August 2008	Kenny Steppe	Germinal Beerschot	(Netherlands) Heerenveen	Undisclosed
29 August 2008	Frederik Vanderbiest	Dender	OH Leuven	Loan
29 August 2008	Wouter Vrancken	Genk	Mechelen	Undisclosed
31 August 2008	Grégory Dufer	Standard Liège	Tubize	Loan
31 August 2008	(Senegal) Cheikhou Kouyaté	Anderlecht	Kortrijk	Loan
31 August 2008	(Argentina) Nicolás Pareja	Anderlecht	(Spain) Espanyol	€4.5m
31 August 2008	(Serbia) Ivan Vukomanović	Lokeren	Antwerp	Undisclosed ^{11}

- ^{10} Siani was on loan to Brussels, now loaned to Sint-Truiden.
- ^{11} Vukomanović was on loan to Maccabi Herzliya, now sold to Antwerp.

=== September 2008 ===
Date	Name	Moving from	Moving to	Fee
1 September 2008	Steve Barbé	Dender	Lierse	Undisclosed
2 September 2008	Marouane Fellaini	Standard Liège	(England) Everton	€18.5m

== Sorted by team ==
=== Anderlecht ===
In: Note: Flags indicate national team as defined under FIFA eligibility rules; some limited exceptions apply. Players may hold more than one non-FIFA nationality.

No.	Pos.	Nation	Player
4	DF	NED	Arnold Kruiswijk (from Groningen)
9	FW	ARG	Matías Suárez (from Belgrano)
10	FW	BRA	Kanu (from Barueri)
16	MF	SEN	Cheikhou Kouyaté (from Brussels)
17	MF	ARG	Hernán Losada (from Germinal Beerschot)
18	DF	BEL	Gil Servaes (from Dender)
20	MF	UKR	Oleksandr Iakovenko (from Genk)
28	MF	BEL	Arnaud Sutchuin (from Brussels)
29	FW	RUS	Dmitri Bulykin (from Leverkusen)
44	DF	SRB	Nemanja Rnić (from Partizan)

Out: Note: Flags indicate national team as defined under FIFA eligibility rules; some limited exceptions apply. Players may hold more than one non-FIFA nationality.

No.	Pos.	Nation	Player
—	FW	TUR	Serhat Akın (to Kocaelispor)
—	DF	BEL	Mark De Man (to Roda JC)
—	MF	EGY	Ahmed Hassan (to Al Ahly)
—	MF	SEN	Cheikhou Kouyaté (loaned to Kortrijk)
—	FW	BEL	Sven Kums (to Kortrijk)
—	FW	BEL	Roland Lamah (to Le Mans)
—	FW	BEL	Mbo Mpenza (to AEL)
—	DF	ARG	Nicolás Pareja (to Espanyol)
—	FW	BEL	Luigi Pieroni (loan return to Nantes)
—	GK	BEL	Silvio Proto (loaned to Germinal Beerschot)
—	MF	CIV	Sébastien Siani (loaned to Sint-Truiden)
—	FW	FRA	Cyril Théréau (to Charleroi)
—	MF	CIV	Cheik Tioté (to Twente)

=== Cercle Brugge ===
In: Note: Flags indicate national team as defined under FIFA eligibility rules; some limited exceptions apply. Players may hold more than one non-FIFA nationality.

No.	Pos.	Nation	Player
1	GK	USA	Patrick Lane (from LMU Lions)
4	MF	ISL	Arnar Viðarsson (from Twente)
8	FW	BEL	Thomas Buffel (from Rangers)
11	FW	PER	José Carlos Fernández (from Odesa)
37	GK	BEL	Jo Coppens (from Genk)

Out: Note: Flags indicate national team as defined under FIFA eligibility rules; some limited exceptions apply. Players may hold more than one non-FIFA nationality.

No.	Pos.	Nation	Player
—	DF	BEL	Rubin Dantschotter (loan to Beveren)
—	FW	NGR	Osahon Eboigbe (loan to OH Leuven)
—	MF	SRB	Slobodan Slović (to Antwerp)
—	DF	BEL	Tom Van Mol (to FCN Sint-Niklaas)

=== Charleroi ===
In: Note: Flags indicate national team as defined under FIFA eligibility rules; some limited exceptions apply. Players may hold more than one non-FIFA nationality.

No.	Pos.	Nation	Player
8	MF	BEL	Sébastien Chabaud (from Germinal Beerschot)
9	FW	MAR	Abdessalam Benjelloun (loaned from Hibernian)
13	FW	FRA	Kamulete Makiese (loaned from Lille)
20	FW	MAR	Mouhcine Iajour (from Chiasso)
24	MF	MAR	Tarik Bendamou (from Marrakech)
77	FW	FRA	Cyril Théréau (from Anderlecht)

Out: Note: Flags indicate national team as defined under FIFA eligibility rules; some limited exceptions apply. Players may hold more than one non-FIFA nationality.

No.	Pos.	Nation	Player
—	FW	NGR	Joseph Akpala (to Club Brugge)
—	MF	FRA	Grégory Christ (loaned to Duisburg)
—	DF	BEL	Laurent Ciman (to Club Brugge)
—	DF	COL	Juan Pablo Pino (loan return to AS Monaco)

=== Club Brugge ===
In: Note: Flags indicate national team as defined under FIFA eligibility rules; some limited exceptions apply. Players may hold more than one non-FIFA nationality.

No.	Pos.	Nation	Player
2	DF	BEL	Laurent Ciman (from Charleroi)
3	MF	USA	Jared Jeffrey (from Dallas Texans)
4	DF	BEL	Bernt Evens (from Westerlo)
8	MF	MAR	Nabil Dirar (from Westerlo)
13	GK	BEL	Geert De Vlieger (from Zulte Waregem)
15	FW	NGR	Joseph Akpala (from Charleroi)
20	MF	VEN	Ronald Vargas (from Caracas)

Out: Note: Flags indicate national team as defined under FIFA eligibility rules; some limited exceptions apply. Players may hold more than one non-FIFA nationality.

No.	Pos.	Nation	Player
—	DF	BEL	Olivier De Cock (released)
—	GK	BEL	Sven De Volder (to Mouscron)
—	DF	BEL	Timothy Dreesen (loaned to Lierse)
—	MF	BEL	Gaëtan Englebert (to Tours)
—	FW	GHA	Salou Ibrahim (to Duisburg)
—	DF	CZE	Štěpán Kučera (loaned to Sparta Prague)
—	DF	BEL	Birger Maertens (to Heracles)
—	DF	DEN	Brian Priske (to Vejle)
—	DF	BEL	Joos Valgaeren (to Emmen)
—	GK	BEL	Glenn Verbauwhede (loaned to Kortrijk)
—	MF	BEL	Sven Vermant (retired)

=== Dender ===
In: Note: Flags indicate national team as defined under FIFA eligibility rules; some limited exceptions apply. Players may hold more than one non-FIFA nationality.

No.	Pos.	Nation	Player
4	DF	BRA	Fred (from Standard Liège)
6	MF	ALG	Khaled Kharroubi (from Valenciennes)
9	FW	BEL	Bart Van den Eede (from Westerlo)
10	MF	BIH	Sulejman Smajić (from Zrinjski Mostar)
11	FW	FRA	Christophe Copel (from UR Namur)
12	DF	BEL	Michaël Wiggers (from Mons)
22	DF	BEL	Siebe Blondelle (from Vitesse Arnhem)
23	MF	BEL	Steven Jacobs (from Mönchengladbach)
—	GK	FRA	Alexandre Martinovic (on loan from Gent)
—	FW	BEL	Dieter Wittesaele (from Gent)

Out: Note: Flags indicate national team as defined under FIFA eligibility rules; some limited exceptions apply. Players may hold more than one non-FIFA nationality.

No.	Pos.	Nation	Player
—	MF	BEL	Steve Barbé (to Lierse)
—	FW	RWA	Henri Munyaneza (to Germinal Beerschot)
—	DF	BEL	Gil Servaes (to Anderlecht)
—	MF	BEL	Frederik Vanderbiest (loaned to OH Leuven)

=== Genk ===
In: Note: Flags indicate national team as defined under FIFA eligibility rules; some limited exceptions apply. Players may hold more than one non-FIFA nationality.

No.	Pos.	Nation	Player
30	DF	BRA	João Carlos (from Lokeren)
32	FW	SVK	Adam Nemec (from Erzgebirge Aue)
33	DF	CZE	Daniel Pudil (from Slavia Prague)
88	MF	HUN	Dániel Tőzsér (from AEK Athens)

Out: Note: Flags indicate national team as defined under FIFA eligibility rules; some limited exceptions apply. Players may hold more than one non-FIFA nationality.

No.	Pos.	Nation	Player
—	GK	BEL	Jo Coppens (to Cercle Brugge)
—	FW	BEL	Faris Haroun (to Germinal Beerschot)
—	MF	UKR	Oleksandr Iakovenko (to Anderlecht)
—	FW	BEL	Arne Nilis (to PSV)
—	MF	BEL	Wouter Vrancken (to Mechelen)
—	MF	ISR	Barak Yitzhaki (to Beitar Jerusalem)

=== Gent ===
In: Note: Flags indicate national team as defined under FIFA eligibility rules; some limited exceptions apply. Players may hold more than one non-FIFA nationality.

No.	Pos.	Nation	Player
6	DF	BEL	Sébastien Phiri (from Brussels)
27	MF	BEL	Benoît Ladrière (from La Louvière)
—	GK	BEL	Frank Boeckx (from Sint-Truiden)
—	DF	BRA	Adriano Duarte (from Mons)

Out: Note: Flags indicate national team as defined under FIFA eligibility rules; some limited exceptions apply. Players may hold more than one non-FIFA nationality.

No.	Pos.	Nation	Player
—	MF	SEN	Khalilou Fadiga (to Germinal Beerschot)
—	GK	FRA	Alexandre Martinovic (on loan to Dender)
—	DF	SRB	Đorđe Svetličić (to Germinal Beerschot)
—	GK	BEL	Stijn Van Der Kelen (to Zulte Waregem)
—	MF	ISR	Gil Vermuth (to Hapoel Tel Aviv)
—	FW	BEL	Dieter Wittesaele (to Dender)
—	FW	POL	Marcin Żewłakow (to APOEL Nicosia)

=== Germinal Beerschot ===
In: Note: Flags indicate national team as defined under FIFA eligibility rules; some limited exceptions apply. Players may hold more than one non-FIFA nationality.

No.	Pos.	Nation	Player
3	DF	BRA	Gustavo Tormena (from Juventude)
7	MF	BEL	Rocky Peeters (from Sint-Truiden)
9	MF	BEL	Faris Haroun (from Genk)
11	FW	RWA	Henri Munyaneza (from Dender)
16	MF	CIV	Marco Né (free agent)
18	FW	SLE	Paul Kpaka (from Roeselare)
19	FW	BEL	Kevin Vandenbergh (on loan from Utrecht)
25	DF	SRB	Đorđe Svetličić (from Gent)
90	FW	BEL	Bartholomeo Ferrara (from Sochaux)
99	MF	SEN	Khalilou Fadiga (from Gent)
—	GK	BEL	Silvio Proto (on loan from Anderlecht)

Out: Note: Flags indicate national team as defined under FIFA eligibility rules; some limited exceptions apply. Players may hold more than one non-FIFA nationality.

No.	Pos.	Nation	Player
—	MF	BEL	Sébastien Chabaud (to Charleroi)
—	MF	ARG	Gustavo Colman (to Trabzonspor)
—	MF	ARG	Hernán Losada (to Anderlecht)
—	FW	NGR	Emmanuel Okoduwa (to Dynamo Kyiv)
—	GK	BEL	Kenny Steppe (to Heerenveen)
—	FW	BEL	Vincenzo Verhoeven (to Hamme)
—	DF	BEL	Jasper Vermeerbergen (to Beveren)
—	DF	BEL	Tim Vleminckx (to Hamme)

=== Kortrijk ===
In: Note: Flags indicate national team as defined under FIFA eligibility rules; some limited exceptions apply. Players may hold more than one non-FIFA nationality.

No.	Pos.	Nation	Player
5	MF	FRA	Karim Belhocine (from Virton)
7	MF	ALG	Adlène Guedioura (from Créteil)
8	MF	BEL	Jo Vermast (from MVV)
9	FW	BRA	William (from Botafogo)
10	FW	BEL	Sven Kums (from Anderlecht)
12	FW	GAM	Ebrahim Savaneh (from Beveren)
13	GK	BEL	Glenn Verbauwhede (on loan from Club Brugge)
23	DF	FRA	Tristan Lahaye (from Amiens)
—	FW	ALG	Mansour Boutabout (from Angers)
—	MF	SEN	Cheikhou Kouyaté (on loan from Anderlecht)
—		BEL	Yves Vanderhaeghe (from Roeselare. Career ended, now assistant-coach)

Out: Note: Flags indicate national team as defined under FIFA eligibility rules; some limited exceptions apply. Players may hold more than one non-FIFA nationality.

No.	Pos.	Nation	Player
—	FW	FRA	Cédric Bétrémieux (to Roeselare)
—		BEL	Frederik Declercq (to Deinze)
—	MF	BEL	Vincent Provoost (to Roeselare)
—	DF	BEL	Nicolas Timmermans (to Westerlo)

=== Lokeren ===
In: Note: Flags indicate national team as defined under FIFA eligibility rules; some limited exceptions apply. Players may hold more than one non-FIFA nationality.

No.	Pos.	Nation	Player
5	DF	ISR	Avi Strool (from Maccabi Netanya)
13	MF	MKD	Ertan Demiri (from Rabotnički)

Out: Note: Flags indicate national team as defined under FIFA eligibility rules; some limited exceptions apply. Players may hold more than one non-FIFA nationality.

No.	Pos.	Nation	Player
—	DF	BRA	João Carlos (to Genk)
—		BFA	Saidou Panandétiguiri (to Wiesbaden)
—	MF	SRB	Ivan Vukomanović (to Antwerp)

=== Mechelen ===
In: Note: Flags indicate national team as defined under FIFA eligibility rules; some limited exceptions apply. Players may hold more than one non-FIFA nationality.

No.	Pos.	Nation	Player
1	GK	BEL	Yannick Thoelen (from Geel)
2	MF	FRA	David Grondin (from Mouscron)
9	FW	BEL	Giuseppe Rossini (from Utrecht)
11	MF	BEL	Joachim Mununga (from Tubize)
15	MF	FRA	Julien Gorius (from Brussels)
20	GK	BEL	Wouter Biebauw (from Roeselare)
—	MF	BEL	Wouter Vrancken (from Genk)

Out: Note: Flags indicate national team as defined under FIFA eligibility rules; some limited exceptions apply. Players may hold more than one non-FIFA nationality.

No.	Pos.	Nation	Player
—	DF	TUN	Anis Boussaidi (loan ended, back to Salzburg)
—	MF	BEL	Issame Charaï (to Sint-Truiden)
—	GK	BEL	Kevin Kempeneer (to Waasland)

=== Mons ===
In: Note: Flags indicate national team as defined under FIFA eligibility rules; some limited exceptions apply. Players may hold more than one non-FIFA nationality.

No.	Pos.	Nation	Player
4	DF	CRO	Ivica Džidić (from Zrinjski Mostar)
14	MF	FRA	Cédric Collet (from Stade Brest)
16	GK	BEL	Grégory Delwarte (from Tournai)
17	MF	BEL	Jérôme van der Zijl (from Lierse)
18	MF	GAM	Mustapha Jarju (from Lierse)
22	FW	BEL	Kevin Oris (from KVSK United)

Out: Note: Flags indicate national team as defined under FIFA eligibility rules; some limited exceptions apply. Players may hold more than one non-FIFA nationality.

No.	Pos.	Nation	Player
—	MF	FRA	Wilfried Dalmat (to Standard Liège)
—	DF	BRA	Adriano Duarte (to Gent)
—	GK	BEL	Charly Konstantinidis (to Nea Salamis)
—	DF	BIH	Danijel Krivić (contract terminated)
—	MF	FRA	Benjamin Nicaise (to Standard Liège)
—	DF	BEL	Michaël Wiggers (to Dender)

=== Mouscron ===
In: Note: Flags indicate national team as defined under FIFA eligibility rules; some limited exceptions apply. Players may hold more than one non-FIFA nationality.

No.	Pos.	Nation	Player
9	FW	BHR	Jesse John (from Muharraq Club)
12	FW	CIV	Bassilia Sakanoko (from Péruwelz)
34	GK	BEL	Sven De Volder (from Club Brugge)
—	MF	FRA	Mamadou Diakité (from Metz)
—	DF	BEL	Chemcedine El Araichi (from Roeselare)
—	MF	BEL	Christophe Lepoint (from Tubize)

Out: Note: Flags indicate national team as defined under FIFA eligibility rules; some limited exceptions apply. Players may hold more than one non-FIFA nationality.

No.	Pos.	Nation	Player
—		BEL	Jean-Philippe Charlet (to Brussels)
—	MF	BEL	Steve Dugardein (to OH Leuven)
—	MF	FRA	David Grondin (to Mechelen)
—	MF	CIV	Adolphe Tohoua (released)
—	FW	CMR	Bertin Tomou (to Westerlo)

=== Roeselare ===
In: Note: Flags indicate national team as defined under FIFA eligibility rules; some limited exceptions apply. Players may hold more than one non-FIFA nationality.

No.	Pos.	Nation	Player
4	DF	FRA	Nasser Daineche (from Istres)
7	FW	RWA	Jimmy Mulisa (from Hamme)
10	FW	BEL	Björn De Wilde (unattached)
11	MF	CIV	Alexandre Tokpa (from Beveren)
13	MF	BEL	Gunter Van Handenhoven (from Al-Ahli)
14	MF	BEL	Thomas Troch (from Aalst)
16	MF	BEL	Bart Goossens (from Hamme)
17	FW	FRA	Cédric Bétrémieux (from Kortrijk)
18	MF	BEL	Vincent Provoost (from Kortrijk)
19	MF	FRA	Boubacar Dembele (from Beauvais)
22	DF	FIN	Janne Hietanen (from Troyes)
24	GK	BEL	Jonathan Bourdon (from Couillet)

Out: Note: Flags indicate national team as defined under FIFA eligibility rules; some limited exceptions apply. Players may hold more than one non-FIFA nationality.

No.	Pos.	Nation	Player
—	GK	BEL	Wouter Biebauw (to Mechelen)
—	FW	BEL	Sébastien Dufoor (to Tienen)
—	DF	BEL	Chemcedine El Araichi (to Mouscron)
—	FW	SLE	Paul Kpaka (to Germinal Beerschot)
—	DF	BEL	Daan Vaesen (to Sint-Truiden)
—		BEL	Yves Vanderhaeghe (to Kortrijk. Career ended, now assistant-coach)

=== Standard Liège ===
In: Note: Flags indicate national team as defined under FIFA eligibility rules; some limited exceptions apply. Players may hold more than one non-FIFA nationality.

No.	Pos.	Nation	Player
6	MF	FRA	Wilfried Dalmat (from Mons)
15	DF	CRO	Tomislav Mikulić (from Dinamo Zagreb)
20	FW	CRO	Leon Benko (from Nürnberg)
26	MF	FRA	Benjamin Nicaise (from Mons)
—	DF	BRA	Digão (on loan from Milan)

Out: Note: Flags indicate national team as defined under FIFA eligibility rules; some limited exceptions apply. Players may hold more than one non-FIFA nationality.

No.	Pos.	Nation	Player
—	DF	BEL	Miguel Dachelet (to Zulte Waregem)
—	MF	BEL	Grégory Dufer (loaned to Tubize)
—	MF	BEL	Marouane Fellaini (to Everton)
—	DF	BRA	Fred (to Dender)
—	DF	BEL	Thomas Phibel (loaned to Brussels)
—	MF	BEL	Vittorio Villano (to Tubize)

=== Tubize ===
In: Note: Flags indicate national team as defined under FIFA eligibility rules; some limited exceptions apply. Players may hold more than one non-FIFA nationality.

No.	Pos.	Nation	Player
2	MF	FRA	Romain Beynié (on loan from Lyon)
10	MF	BEL	Vittorio Villano (from Standard Liège)
13	MF	BEL	Alan Haydock (from Brussels)
14	DF	CRO	Josip Barišić (from Segesta)
18	DF	BEL	Jason Vandelannoite (from Bursaspor)
20	MF	BRA	Thiago (from Rio Claro)
59	FW	FRA	Vincent Ramaël (on loan from AS Monaco)
99	FW	BRA	Santiago (unclear)
—	MF	BEL	Grégory Dufer (on loan from Standard Liège)
—	MF	BEL	Yannick Vervalle (from Ilisiakos)

Out: Note: Flags indicate national team as defined under FIFA eligibility rules; some limited exceptions apply. Players may hold more than one non-FIFA nationality.

No.	Pos.	Nation	Player
—	GK	BEL	Thierry Berghmans (to Willebroek-Meerhof)
—	MF	BEL	Christophe Lepoint (to Mouscron)
—	MF	BEL	Joachim Mununga (to Mechelen)
—	FW	BEL	Kevin Stuckens (to Woluwe-Zaventem)

=== Westerlo ===
In: Note: Flags indicate national team as defined under FIFA eligibility rules; some limited exceptions apply. Players may hold more than one non-FIFA nationality.

No.	Pos.	Nation	Player
2	DF	BEL	Nicolas Timmermans (from Kortrijk)
9	FW	CMR	Bertin Tomou (from Mouscron)
17	MF	PER	Johan Sotil (from José Gálvez)
19	FW	COL	Jaime Alfonso Ruiz (from Alianza Lima)
24	MF	NED	Sergio Hellings (from Leicester City)
30	GK	BEL	Bart Deelkens (from Beveren)
—	MF		Lens Annab (from Eisden Sport)

Out: Note: Flags indicate national team as defined under FIFA eligibility rules; some limited exceptions apply. Players may hold more than one non-FIFA nationality.

No.	Pos.	Nation	Player
—	DF	BEL	Bernt Evens (to Club Brugge)
—	MF	MAR	Nabil Dirar (to Club Brugge)
—	FW	BEL	Bart Van den Eede (to Dender)
—	MF	BEL	Marc Wagemakers (to Sint-Truiden)

=== Zulte Waregem ===
In: Note: Flags indicate national team as defined under FIFA eligibility rules; some limited exceptions apply. Players may hold more than one non-FIFA nationality.

No.	Pos.	Nation	Player
3	DF	BEL	Steve Colpaert (from Brussels)
9	FW	FRA	Zahir Zerdab (from Reims)
12	MF	BEL	Thomas Matton (from OH Leuven)
15	DF	BEL	Miguel Dachelet (from Standard Liège)
16	MF	FRA	Franck Berrier (from Cannes)
17	DF	ESP	Chapi (from Deportivo La Coruña)
18	FW	BEL	Andréa Mbuyi-Mutombo (on loan from Portsmouth)
19	FW	SUI	Danijel Subotić (on loan from Portsmouth)
21	MF	GER	Markus Neumayr (from Duisburg)
22	GK	BEL	Stijn Van Der Kelen (from Gent)

Out: Note: Flags indicate national team as defined under FIFA eligibility rules; some limited exceptions apply. Players may hold more than one non-FIFA nationality.

No.	Pos.	Nation	Player
—	MF	BEL	Nathan D'Haemers (to Beveren)
—	GK	BEL	Geert De Vlieger (to Club Brugge)
—	DF	FRA	Frédéric Dindeleux (to Oostende)
—	FW	CRO	Nikica Jelavić (loaned to Rapid Wien)
—	DF	BEL	Lander Van Steenbrugghe (loaned to OH Leuven)

== See also ==
- List of Dutch football transfers Summer 2008
- List of English football transfers Summer 2008
- List of Spanish football transfers Summer 2008
