= 2006–07 Belgian Cup =

Tournament details
- Country: Belgium

Final positions
- Champions: Club Brugge
- Runners-up: Standard Liège

The 2006–07 Belgian Cup was the 52nd staging of the Belgian Cup which is the main knock-out football competition in Belgium, won by Club Brugge.

== Results ==
Sixth round
Roeselare	3
P	Mol-Wezel	0
D2	Tienen	1
Gent	2
D2	Mechelen	1*
Germinal Beerschot	0*
Zulte-Waregem	7
D3	La Louvière	0
Club Brugge	2
D2	Union	0
Westerlo	1
P	Woluwe-Zaventem	0
D2	Kortrijk	3*
FC Brussels	1*
D3	Cappellen	1 (2)
Sint-Truidense	1 (3)
Racing Genk	3
D3	Geel	2
Mouscron	2
D2	Tubize	0
Anderlecht	5
D2	Dessel	1
D2	Dender EH	1
Cercle Brugge	0
Lierse	1
SK Beveren	0
D2	Antwerp	4
SC Lokeren	1
Standard Liège	6
Eupen	1
Charleroi	2 (3)
D2	Hamme	2 (4)

Seventh Round
Roeselare	2
Gent	3
D2	Mechelen	1
Zulte-Waregem	0
Club Brugge	1
Westerlo	0
D2	Kortrijk	4
Sint-Truidense	2
Racing Genk	1
Excelsior Mouscron	0
Anderlecht	5
D2	Dender EH	2
Lierse	1
D2	Antwerp	4
Standard Liège	5
D2	Hamme	0

Quarter-finals
Gent	2 1
D2	Mechelen	1 0
Club Brugge	2 1
D2	Kortrijk	1 1
Racing Genk	0 0
Anderlecht	1 6
D2	Antwerp	0 0
Standard Liège	1 4

Semifinals
Gent	3 0
Club Brugge	1 2
Anderlecht	0 1
Standard Liège	1 2

Final
Club Brugge	1
Standard Liège	0

=== Legend ===
- * = after extra-time
- D2 = second division
- D3 = third division
- P = promotion

== Matches ==
=== Round 6 ===
Teams from the first division enter the competition at this stage except for the newly promoted team, Mons, who had to start in round four and immediately lost against U.R.S. du Centre. The teams from the first division that enter at this stage are seeded and can't meet each other, except for the team that ended in 17th position last season, Lierse. Apart from the 17 teams directly qualified, 15 other teams had qualified through winning in the fifth round:

- 10 from second division: Antwerp, Dessel, Eupen, Hamme, Kortrijk, KV Mechelen, Tienen, Tubize, Union and Dender EH.
- 3 from third division: Cappellen, Geel and La Louvière.
- 2 from promotion: Mol-Wezel and Woluwe-Zaventem.

21 October 2006	Mouscron	2–0 (a.e.t.)	Tubize (D2)	Mouscron
18:00	B. Tomou 94', 115'			Stadium: Stade Le Canonnier

21 October 2006	Anderlecht	5–1	Dessel (D2)	Brussels
20:00	N. Frutos 23' (pen.); A. Hassan 34'; M. Tchité 41', 43'; S. Akin 45'		W. Vosters 65'	Stadium: Constant Vanden Stock Stadium; Referee: Luc Wouters

21 October 2006	RC Genk	3–2	Geel (D3)	Genk
20:00	H. Cornelis 25' (pen.); W. Vrancken 62'; G. Ljubojević 75'		A. Caramazza 58'; R. Van De Weyer 64'	Stadium: Fenix Stadion; Referee: Laurent Colemonts

21 October 2006	Charleroi	2–2 (a.e.t.) (3–4 p)	Hamme (D2)	Charleroi
20:00	M. Kéré 54'; B. Jovial 91'		K. Versyp 23'; J. D'Haeseleer 106'	Stadium: Stade du Pays de Charleroi

21 October 2006	Antwerp (D2)	4–1	Lokeren	Antwerp
20:00	F. Dong 3', 42'; S. Mamam 60'; F. Campbell 81'		P. Tambwe 19'	Stadium: Bosuilstadion; Referee: Peter Jordens

21 October 2006	Lierse	2–1	Beveren	Lier
20:00	M. Andic 44'; G. Mujanovic 81'		L. Macquet 23'	Stadium: Herman Vanderpoortenstadion; Referee: Peter Vervecken

21 October 2006	Westerlo	1–0	Woluwe-Zaventem (P)	Westerlo
20:00	N. Dirar 48'			Stadium: Het Kuipje

22 October 2006	Tienen (D2)	1–2	Gent	Tienen
15:00	C. Geebelen 68'		N. Pavlovic 46'; D. Foley 76'	Stadium: Julien Bergéstadion; Referee: Johan Verbist

22 October 2006	Dender EH (D2)	1–0	Cercle Brugge	Denderleeuw
15:00	G. Thiebaut 85' (pen.)			Stadium: Florent Beeckmanstadion

22 October 2006	Roeselare	3–0	Mol-Wezel (P)	Roeselare
15:00	B. Smits 32'; D. Vaesen 39'; P. Kpaka 66'			Stadium: Schiervelde Stadion

22 October 2006	Kortrijk (D2)	3–1 (a.e.t.)	FC Brussels	Kortrijk
15:00	B. Vervaeke 84'; B. Verbrugghe 104'; N. Gezelle 115'		J. Gorius 33'	Stadium: Guldensporen Stadion

22 October 2006	Cappellen (D3)	1–1 (a.e.t.) (2–3 p)	Sint-Truiden	Kapellen
16:00	T. De Keyser 88' (pen.)		P. Van Houdt 23'	Stadium: Stadion Jos Van Wellen

22 October 2006	Club Brugge	2–0	Union (D2)	Bruges
18:00	S. Ibrahim 24'; S. Vermant 83'			Stadium: Jan Breydel Stadion

22 October 2006	Zulte-Waregem	7–0	La Louvière (D3)	Waregem
19:00	L. Van Nieuwenhuyze 15' (pen.); D. Mrdja 33', 45'; M. Datti 51', 86'; N. D'Haemers 70'; L. Van Steenbrugghe 85'			Stadium: Regenboogstadion

22 October 2006	Standard Liège	6–1	Eupen (D2)	Liège
20:00	M. Jovanovic 13', 37' (pen.), 45', 88'; S. Dembélé 41'; M. Fellaini 70'		R. Farssi 57' (pen.)	Stadium: Stade Sclessin

25 October 2006	KV Mechelen (D2)	1–0 (a.e.t.)	Germinal Beerschot	Mechelen
20:45	I. Charaï 95'			Stadium: Achter de Kazerne

=== Round 7 ===
13 January 2007	Lierse	1–4	Antwerp (D2)	Lier
20:00	M. Jarju 20'		K. Baert 14'; D. Lukanovic 43'; L. Olguin 49'; S. Mamam 69'	Stadium: Herman Vanderpoortenstadion

13 January 2007	Standard Liège	5–0	Hamme (D2)	Liège
20:00	M. Jovanović 12' (pen.); I. De Camargo 38', 48', 56'; A. Lukunku 90'			Stadium: Stade Sclessin

13 January 2007	Roeselare	2–3	Gent	Roeselare
20:00	S. Allagui 14'; M. Annys 89'		C. El Araichi 27' (o.g.); A. Olufadé 78'; A. Stoica 85'	Stadium: Schiervelde Stadion

13 January 2007	RC Genk	1–0	Mouscron	Genk
20:45	H. Cornelis 71' (pen.)			Stadium: Fenix Stadion

14 January 2007	Anderlecht	5–2	Dender EH (D2)	Brussels
14:30	M. Boussoufa 13', 81'; M. Mpenza 22'; N. Frutos 43', 71'		K. Persoons 11'; K. Franck 73' (pen.)	Stadium: Constant Vanden Stock Stadium

14 January 2007	Club Brugge	1–0	Westerlo	Bruges
14:30	P. Clement 9'			Stadium: Jan Breydel Stadion

14 January 2007	Kortrijk (D2)	4–2	Sint-Truiden	Kortrijk
14:30	M. Makhloufi 5'; D. Calvo 44'; A. Nong 48'; J. Vermast 56'		M. Hendrikx 6'; H. Bouslama 65'	Stadium: Guldensporen Stadion

14 January 2007	KV Mechelen (D2)	1–0	Zulte-Waregem	Mechelen
17:30	J. Ivens 28' (pen.)			Stadium: Achter de Kazerne

=== Quarter-finals ===
==== First legs ====
28 February 2007	RC Genk	0–1	Anderlecht	Genk
20:45			N. Frutos 74'	Stadium: Fenix Stadion

28 February 2007	Club Brugge	2–1	Kortrijk (D2)	Bruges
20:45	I. Leko 31'; B. Balaban 59'		G. Verbauwhede 54' (o.g.)	Stadium: Jan Breydel Stadion

28 February 2007	Gent	2–1	KV Mechelen (D2)	Ghent
20:45	N. Pavlovic 36', 39'		B. van Zundert 54'	Stadium: Jules Ottenstadion

28 February 2007	Antwerp (D2)	0–1	Standard Liège	Antwerp
20:45			I. De Camargo 70'	Stadium: Bosuilstadion

==== Second legs ====
14 March 2007	Kortrijk (D2)	1–1 (2–3 agg.)	Club Brugge	Kortrijk
20:30	A. Nong 20'		B. Balaban 70'	Stadium: Guldensporen Stadion

14 March 2007	KV Mechelen (D2)	0–1 (1–3 agg.)	Gent	Mechelen
20:30			A. Olufadé 70'	Stadium: Achter de Kazerne

14 March 2007	Standard Liège	4–0 (5–0 agg.)	Antwerp (D2)	Liège
20:30	I. De Camargo 22'; M. Jovanović 85' (pen.), 90+2'; S. Defour 88'			Stadium: Stade Sclessin

14 March 2007	Anderlecht	6–0 (7–0 agg.)	RC Genk	Brussels
20:45	M. von Schlebrügge 21'; N. Frutos 47' (pen.); A. Hassan 49', 87'; M. Tchité 78', 80'			Stadium: Constant Vanden Stock Stadium

=== Semi-finals ===
==== First legs ====
17 April 2007	Anderlecht	0–1	Standard Liège	Brussels
20:30			M. Jovanović 67'	Stadium: Constant Vanden Stock Stadium

18 April 2007	Gent	3–1	Club Brugge	Ghent
20:30	J. Valgaeren 44' (o.g.); D. Foley 50'; A. Stoica 59'		B. Balaban 84'	Stadium: Jules Ottenstadion

==== Second legs ====
8 May 2007	Club Brugge	2–0 (3a–3 agg.)	Gent	Bruges
20:45	I. Leko 33'; B. Balaban 50'			Stadium: Jan Breydel Stadion

9 May 2007	Standard Liège	2–1 (3–1 agg.)	Anderlecht	Liège
20:45	A. Witsel 47'; M. Jovanović 76' (pen.)		D. Mbokani 65'	Stadium: Stade Sclessin

=== Final ===
26 May 2007
20:45 CEST

Club Brugge	1–0	Standard Liège
Ishiaku 85'	Report

King Baudouin Stadium, Brussels
Attendance: 43,000
Referee: Peter Vervecken

== See also ==
- Belgian Cup - main article
