= 1991–92 PSV Eindhoven season =

PSV Eindhoven
1991–92 season
- Manager: Bobby Robson
- Stadium: Philips Stadion
- Eredivisie: 1st
- KNVB Cup: Round of 16
- European Cup: Second Round
- Top goalscorer: League: Wim Kieft (18); All: Wim Kieft (18)
Home colours

In the 1991–92 Dutch football season, PSV Eindhoven competed in the Eredivisie. PSV won the Eredivisie that season and also participated in the European Cup going out in the second round to Anderlecht.

== First-team squad ==
Note: Flags indicate national team as defined under FIFA eligibility rules; some limited exceptions apply. Players may hold more than one non-FIFA nationality.

No.	Pos.	Nation	Player
—	GK	NED	Wim de Ron
—	GK	NED	Hans van Breukelen
—	DF	NED	Jerry de Jong
—	DF	BEL	Eric Gerets
—	DF	DEN	Jan Heintze
—	DF	ROU	Gheorghe Popescu
—	DF	THA	Geoffrey Prommayon
—	DF	NED	Stan Valckx
—	DF	NED	Berry van Aerle
—	DF	NED	Adri van Tiggelen
—	MF	NED	Arnold Doomernik

No.	Pos.	Nation	Player
—	MF	NED	Erwin Koeman
—	MF	NED	Edward Linskens
—	MF	NED	Dick Schreuder
—	MF	BEL	Tom Van Mol
—	MF	NED	Gerald Vanenburg
—	FW	ZAM	Kalusha Bwalya
—	FW	NED	Juul Ellerman
—	FW	NED	Peter Hoekstra
—	FW	NED	Wim Kieft
—	FW	BRA	Romário
—	FW	NED	Twan Scheepers

== Transfers ==
=== In ===
- (Belgium) Tom Van Mol - (Belgium) Anderlecht U19 - Free
- (Netherlands) Adri van Tiggelen - (Belgium) Anderlecht
- (Netherlands) Wim Kieft - (France) Bordeaux
- (Netherlands) Ernest Faber - (Netherlands) Nijmegen
- (Netherlands) François Gesthuizen - (Netherlands) PSV Eindhoven
- (Netherlands) Michel Boerebach - (Netherlands) Roda JC

=== Out ===
- (Netherlands) John Bosman - (Belgium) Anderlecht - £810,000
- (Netherlands) Michel Boerebach - (Netherlands) Roda JC
- (Netherlands) Raymond Beerens - (Netherlands) Waalwijk - Loan
- (Czech Republic) Jozef Chovanec - (Czech Republic) Sparta Praha - Loan
- (Thailand) Geoffrey Prommanyon - (Netherlands) FC Eindhoven - Loan
- (Netherlands) Ernest Faber - (Netherlands) Sparta Rotterdam - Loan
- (Netherlands) Mario Captein - (Belgium) KFC Turnhout - Loan
- (Netherlands) Adick Koot - (France) Cannes
- (Netherlands) Jan Nederburgh - (Netherlands) Telstar

== Results ==
=== European Cup ===
18 September 1991 First Round	Beşiktaş (Turkey)	1–1	(Netherlands) PSV Eindhoven	İnönü Stadium
	Özdilek 80' (pen.)	Report	Ellerman 27'	Attendance: 32,500; Referee: Rosario Lo Bello

2 October 1991 First Round	PSV Eindhoven (Netherlands)	2–1	(Turkey) Beşiktaş	Philips Stadion
	Vanenburg 25'; Kalusha 74'	Report	Tekin 4'	Attendance: 46,000; Referee: Wolf-Günter Wiesel

23 October 1991 Second Round	PSV Eindhoven (Netherlands)	0–0	(Belgium) Anderlecht	Philips Stadion
		Report		Attendance: 27,000; Referee: Hubert Forstinger

6 November 1991 Second Round	Anderlecht (Belgium)	2–0	(Netherlands) PSV Eindhoven	Constant Vanden Stock Stadium
	Degryse 10'; Boffin 90'	Report		Attendance: 28,000; Referee: Bruno Galler
