= Laurent Wuillot =

Belgian footballer and manager

Personal information
- Date of birth: 11 July 1975 (age 51)
- Place of birth: Tournai, Belgium
- Height: 1.90 m (6 ft 3 in)
- Position: Defender

Senior career*
Years	Team	Apps	(Gls)
1993–1994	R.A.E.C. Mons		
1994–1999	Charleroi	92	(5)
1999–2002	Standard Liège	30	(2)
2002–2004	Ajaccio		
2004–2005	FC Brussels	19	(0)
2005–2006	Zulte Waregem		
2006–2007	RRC Péruwelz		

Managerial career
- 2020–: RAFC Cuesmes
- * Club domestic league appearances and goals

Laurent Wuillot (born 11 July 1975) is a Belgian retired professional footballer who now works as manager of RAFC Cuesmes in his home country.

== Career ==
Wuillot started his senior career with R.A.E.C. Mons. In 2002, he signed for Ajaccio in the Ligue 1. After that, he played for FC Brussels, RRC Péruwelz, and Francs Borains.
