= Vleminckx =

Vleminckx is a Flemish surname. Notable people with the surname include:

- Andras Vleminckx, Belgian music producer
- Björn Vleminckx (born 1985), Belgian footballer
- Tim Vleminckx (born 1987), Belgian footballer

== See also ==
- Martin & Vleminckx
