= Sotil =

Sotil is a surname. Notable people with the surname include:

- Hugo Sotil (1949–2024), Peruvian footballer
- Johan Sotil (born 1982), Peruvian footballer, son of Hugo
