= Josip Barišić =

Josip Barišić may refer to:

- Josip Barišić (footballer, born 1981), Croatian footballer
- Josip Barišić (footballer, born 1983), Bosnian footballer
- Josip Barišić (footballer, born 1986), Croatian footballer
