= Vittorio Villano =

Belgian footballer

Vittorio Villano (born 2 February 1988) is a Belgian football player who currently plays for AFC Tubize in Belgium. His position is in the right side of the midfield.
