= Steve Barbé =

Belgian footballer (born 1979)

Personal information
- Full name: Steve Barbé
- Date of birth: 15 January 1979 (age 47)
- Place of birth: Asse, Belgium
- Height: 1.84 m (6 ft 0 in)
- Position: Midfielder

Youth career
- 1986–1996: RWD Molenbeek

Senior career*
Years	Team	Apps	(Gls)
1996–1999	RWD Molenbeek	79	(1)
2000–2001	→ Charlton Athletic (loan)	0	(0)
2001–2003	KRC Harelbeke	49	(1)
2002–2003	FC Brussels	23	(3)
2004–2008	KSV Roeselare	105	(8)
- * Club domestic league appearances and goals as of 13:18, 21 March 2017 (UTC)

Steve Barbé (born 15 January 1979) is a retired Belgian professional footballer who played for FC Brussels, RWD Molenbeek, Charlton Athletic, KRC Harelbeke and KSV Roeselare as a midfielder.

== Career ==
Born in Asse, Barbé grew up just 10 km from the Edmond Machtens Stadium and began training with RWD Molenbeek when he was just 7 years old. His talent stood out and at the age of 16 he was invited to play for the Under 23 team. In 1996 he was elevated into the first team squad by René Vandereycken who saw him as the long term replacement for midfielder Guy Vandersmissen. On August 24, 1996 Barbé made his first team debut, replacing Alan Haydock in the 75th minute of a 3-0 away defeat to Standard Liège. He went on to make 15 league appearances that season, scoring once. On 2 November 1996 he was part of the Molenbeek team that scored a historic 1-0 win away to local rivals R.S.C. Anderlecht at the Constant Vanden Stock Stadium.

The following year Barbé appeared in 31 of Molenbeek's 34 league matches, establishing himself as a first team regular. Barbe was scouted by Club Brugge KV as a potential replacement for ageing midfielder Franky Van der Elst but in August, 1999 joined English side Charlton Athletic on a season long loan. The team won the Football League First Division and were promoted to the English Premier League.

After a single season in England he returned to Belgium, joining FC Brussels. In 2003 he moved to KSV Roeselare and went on to make over 100 appearances for the club, in the 2003/2004 Belgian First Division B season he scored 5 league goals and the following season Barbe scored 3 as KSV Roeselare finished second and were promoted to the Jupiler Pro League via the playoffs. On July 13, 2006 he made his European debut coming off the bench in the 75th minute of KSV Roeselare's 1-0 away win at FK Vardar in the opening round of the UEFA Cup. He would go on to have brief spells with both FCV Dender and K.V.K. Tienen-Hageland before retiring in 2009.

== Coaching ==
As of 2017 Barbé is the head coach at the Dusit Thani Hua Hin Soccer Academy in Hua Hin.
