= Vincent Ramaël =

French footballer (born 1988)

Personal information
- Full name: Vincent Christian Benoît Ramaël
- Date of birth: 22 June 1988 (age 38)
- Place of birth: Clamart, France
- Height: 1.88 m (6 ft 2 in)
- Position: Forward

Youth career
- 2006: Excelsior Mouscron
- 2006–2007: Monaco

Senior career*
Years	Team	Apps	(Gls)
2006	Excelsior Mouscron		
2006–2009	Monaco B	34	(0)
2008	→ Tubize (loan)	8	(1)
2009–2010	Cassis Carnoux		
2010–2011	Levadiakos	2	(0)
2011–2012	Géants Athois		
2012–2013	Sint-Eloois-Winkel		
2013–2014	Le Touquet		
2014–2016	Pennoise		
2016	Sportivo San Lorenzo		
2016–2018	Cassis Carnoux		
2018	Lusitanos	7	(8)
2018–2019	Sant Julià	11	(2)
- * Club domestic league appearances and goals

Vincent Ramaël (born 22 June 1988) is a French former professional footballer who played as a forward.

== Career ==
Ramaël was born in Clamart, France. He began his career with Belgian side Excelsior Mouscron, where he signed his first professional contract on 31 August 2006. On 26 September 2006, he joined AS Monaco FC. He joined A.F.C. Tubize on loan on 18 July 2008. before returning to Monaco on 12 January 2009.

For the 2011–12 season he was signed by Belgian Third Division club Royal Geants Athois.
