= Hua Hin Soccer Academy =

Thai football club

- Full name: Dusit Thani Hua Hin Soccer Academy
- Founded: November 2013; 12 years ago
- League: MOL League
- Location: Dusit Thani Hotel, Hua Hin
- Owner: Steve Barbé
- Website: www.huahinacademy.com

The Hua Hin Soccer Academy is a football academy in Thailand run by former professional player Steve Barbé based at the Dusit Thani hotel in Hua Hin.

== History ==
The academy opened in November 2013 at the Dusit Thani hotel in Hua Hin and was originally called the Dusit Thani Hua Hin Football Academy before being rebranded as the Dusit Thani Hua Hin Soccer Academy in 2016. The teams initially competed in the Western Thailand Football Academy League but now compete in Group E of the MOL League.

The academy has a partnership with J&S International Football Management who represent professional players including Kevin De Bruyne and players from the academy have gone on to earn trials with major European clubs like R.S.C. Anderlecht

Coaches from the academy also puts on free coaching clinics for stateless, landless children from the Karen community in Pala U Noi.

In October, 2017 the academy was shortlisted for the 'Best Sport Youth Development Program' award at the 2017 Asia Sports Industry Awards.

Guest coaches who have come to the academy include former Dutch international goalkeeper Stanley Menzo, former England, Brighton & Hove Albion and Tottenham defender Gary Stevens. and former BEC Tero Sasana and Sukhothai manager Jason Withe.
