= Jérôme van der Zijl =

Belgian footballer

Jerome van der Zijl
Personal information
- Date of birth: 24 August 1988 (age 38)
- Place of birth: Brussels, Belgium
- Height: 1.85 m (6 ft 1 in)
- Position: Defender

Jérôme van der Zijl (born 24 August 1988 in Brussels) is a Belgian footballer who plays as a defender. His club teams include Lierse S.K., RAEC Mons, KSC Grimbergen, and A.F.C. Tubize. He married tennis player Yanina Wickmayer in 2017.
