= Jonathan Bourdon =

Belgian footballer

Personal information
- Date of birth: 3 September 1981 (age 45)
- Place of birth: Biercee, Belgium
- Height: 1.80 m (5 ft 11 in)
- Position: Goalkeeper

Team information
- Current team: ROCCM
- Number: 24

Senior career*
Years	Team	Apps	(Gls)
2000–2005	K.V.C Westerlo	65	(0)
2008–2010	SV Roeselare	3	(0)
2010–	ROCCM		
- * Club domestic league appearances and goals

Jonathan Bourdon (born 3 September 1981 in Biercee) is a Belgian professional footballer. He currently plays for R.O.C. de Charleroi-Marchienne.
