= Joachim Mununga =

Belgian footballer

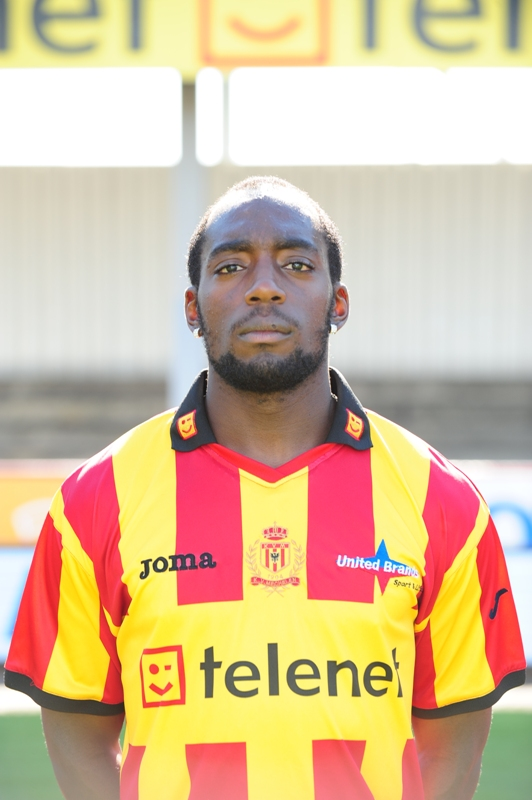
- Mununga with KV Mechelen in 2010

Personal information
- Full name: Joachim Lubangwana Mununga
- Date of birth: 30 June 1988 (age 38)
- Place of birth: Ottignies, Belgium
- Height: 1.79 m (5 ft 10 in)
- Position: Attacking midfielder

Youth career
- 2000–2003: Standard Liège
- 2003–2006: R.E. Mouscron

Senior career*
| Years | Team | Apps | (Gls) |
| 2006–2008 | Tubize | 60 | (20) |
| 2008–2011 | KV Mechelen | 101 | (32) |
| 2011–2012 | Gençlerbirliği | 20 | (1) |
| 2012–2013 | Beerschot | 20 | (10) |
| 2013–2014 | Mons | 20 | (2) |
| 2014–2016 | Maccabi Petah Tikva | 55 | (6) |
| 2016–2017 | Viterbese | 4 | (0) |

International career
| 2005–2006 | Belgium U18 | 6 | (0) |
| 2008 | Belgium U20 | 2 | (0) |
| 2009–2010 | Belgium U21 | 11 | (2) |
| 2011 | Congo DR | 1 | (0) |

Managerial career
- 2017–2018: OH Leuven (youth)
- 2018–2023: OH Leuven (assistant)
- 2024: Cameroon (assistant)
- * Club domestic league appearances and goals as of 3 January 2016

Joachim Mununga (born 30 June 1988 in Ottignies) is a retired football player who last played for Viterbese. Currently he is assistant coach at OH Leuven. Born in Belgium, he represented the Democratic Republic of the Congo national football team.

== Career ==
Mununga promoted with AFC Tubize to the highest level of Belgian football in 2008. He decided however to leave the team and to sign for KV Mechelen, as a lot of other players left Tubize.

In January 2011, he left KV Mechelen for Gençlerbirliği SK, but returned to Belgium in 2012 to play for Beerschot AC

== Position ==
Mununga can play as well as striker as midfielder.
