= Gheorghe Popescu =

Romanian footballer (born 1967)

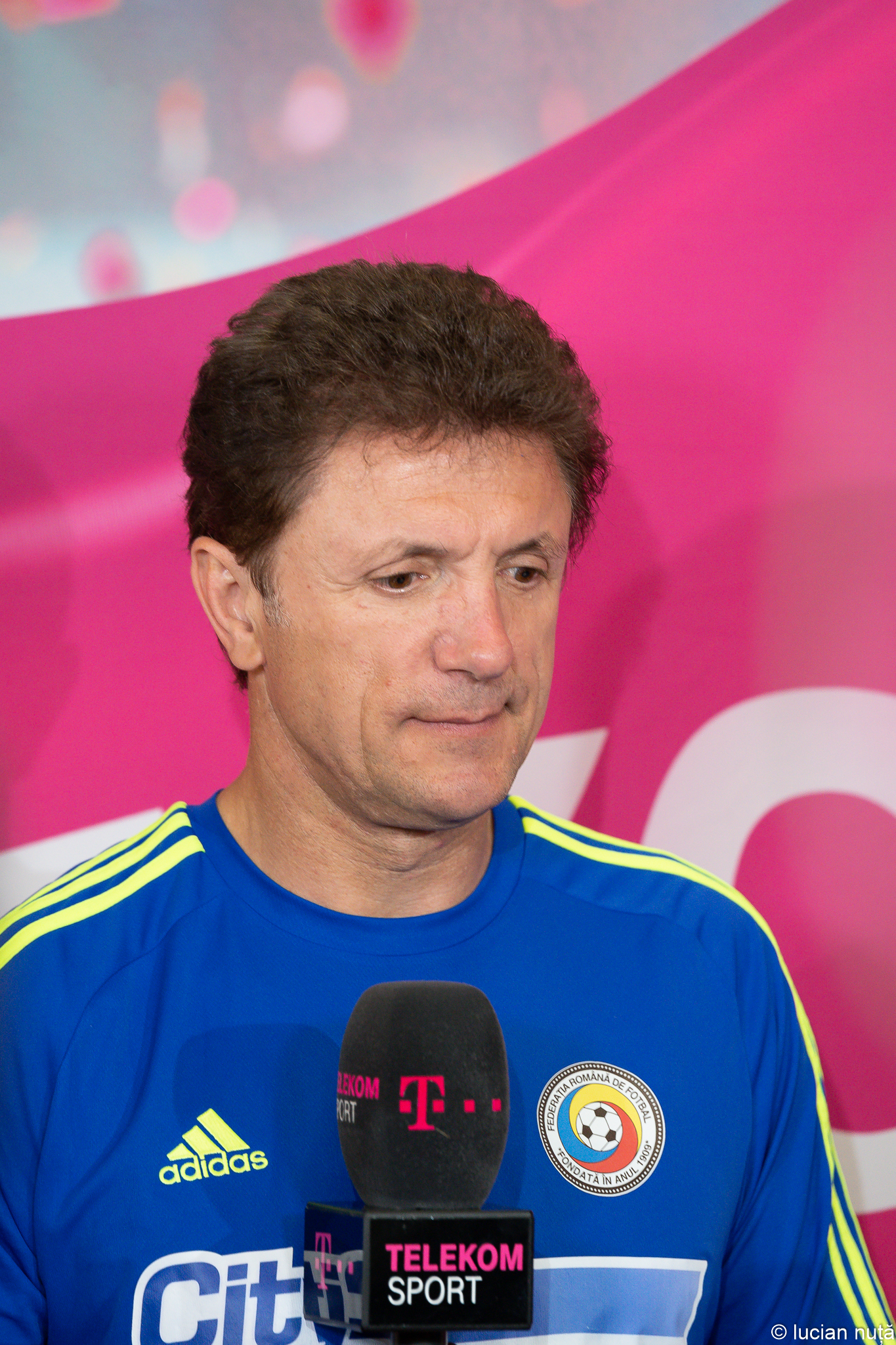
- Popescu in 2018

Personal information
- Date of birth: 9 October 1967 (age 59)
- Place of birth: Calafat, Romania
- Height: 1.88 m (6 ft 2 in)
- Positions: Sweeper; centre back; midfielder

Team information
- Current team: Farul Constanța (chairman)

Youth career
- 1975–1982: Dunărea Calafat

Senior career*
Years	Team	Apps	(Gls)
1982–1984	Dunărea Calafat		
1985–1990	Universitatea Craiova	124	(18)
1988	→ Steaua București (loan)	13	(1)
1990–1994	PSV	108	(23)
1994–1995	Tottenham Hotspur	23	(3)
1995–1997	Barcelona	66	(9)
1997–2001	Galatasaray	111	(6)
2001–2002	Lecce	28	(3)
2002	Dinamo București	8	(0)
2002–2003	Hannover 96	14	(1)
Total		495	(64)

International career
1988–2003	Romania	115	(16)
- * Club domestic league appearances and goals

Gheorghe "Gică" Popescu (Romanian pronunciation: [ˈɡe̯orɡe ˈdʒikə poˈpesku]; born 9 October 1967) is a Romanian former professional football player who played as a defender, currently he is the owner and the president of Liga I club Farul Constanța.

He notably played in La Liga, where he was a former captain of FC Barcelona. He played for a string of European clubs in that period, including a four-year stint at PSV Eindhoven and winning the UEFA Cup with Galatasaray. He also played in the Premier League with Tottenham Hotspur, in Serie A with Lecce and in the Bundesliga with Hannover 96. In his native country he played for Universitatea Craiova, Steaua București and Dinamo București. In addition to his defensive skills, he was also capable of starting attacks deep from his own half. For 13 years, Popescu consistently ranked within the top four of the Romanian Footballer of the Year award between 1989 and 2001, winning it six times.

His tactical knowledge as a defender made him a valuable team member in top European competitions until he reached his late thirties. He was a key part of the Romania national team in the 1990s and earned 115 caps, scoring 16 goals. He was present at the 1990 World Cup, the 1994 World Cup, Euro 1996, the 1998 World Cup and Euro 2000. He is the brother-in-law of fellow Romanian international Gheorghe Hagi.

== Club career ==
=== Dunărea Calafat ===
Popescu, nicknamed Baciul (The Shepherd) due to his leadership skills, was born on 9 October 1967 in Calafat, Romania and began playing junior-level football in 1975 at local club Dunărea. During his childhood years, his father would take him to Universitatea Craiova's matches during their "Craiova Maxima" era, and at one point Popescu told him: "Father, the day will come when I will be in Ștefănescu's place. And the people will love me more than him!" He started to play in the Romanian lower leagues for Dunărea's senior squad in 1982. His first coach, Valentin Ghiță, noted Popescu's ambition and passion, citing an instance in the winter of 1983 when Popescu sought him out for training. Ghiță agreed, training Popescu despite severe winter conditions.

=== Universitatea Craiova and Steaua București ===
In 1985, his talent was noticed by Nicolae Zamfir who brought him to play for Universitatea Craiova. Popescu made his Divizia A debut on 9 June 1985, when coach Florin Halagian sent him in the second half to replace Marian Bâcu in a 1–0 home victory against FCM Brașov. He scored his first goal in the competition almost one year later in a 7–0 win over Rapid București.

In the middle of the 1987–88 season, Popescu joined Steaua București, and played 13 league matches with one goal scored under coach Anghel Iordănescu, winning the title. He also played in both legs of the European Cup semi-finals in the 2–0 aggregate loss to Benfica.

He returned in 1988 to "U" Craiova where in the following two seasons he developed an appetite for goals, netting 15 goals. Notably, he scored a career-best of eight goals during the 1988–89 season.

=== PSV Eindhoven ===
In the summer of 1990, Popescu was transferred from Craiova to PSV Eindhoven, playing under Bobby Robson for two of his four seasons there. He made his Eredivisie debut on 28 August 1990 in a 5–0 home win over FC Utrecht. He scored his first goal on 8 September 1990, sealing the win in a 3–0 victory over MVV Maastricht. In his first two seasons, Popescu won two league titles under Robson. He then won the 1992 Dutch Supercup, being used the entire match by coach Hans Westerhof in the 1–0 victory against Feyenoord. In his years at PSV, Popescu was a regular starter for the club, also developing a close friendship with Brazilians Romário and Ronaldo.

=== Tottenham Hotspur ===
He was transferred to Tottenham Hotspur in the Premier League on 9 September 1994 for a fee of £2.9 million, being teammates with fellow Romanian Ilie Dumitrescu. He made his league debut on 24 September 1994, as coach Osvaldo Ardiles used him the entire match in a 4–1 home loss to Nottingham Forest. He made 23 league appearances and scored three goals, including one in a home win against Arsenal, when he beat goalkeeper David Seaman after a counter-attack. Spurs (who changed managers from Ardiles to Gerry Francis a few weeks after Popescu arrived) finished seventh with his help – their highest league finish in five years. He also helped them reach the FA Cup semi-finals, where they lost 4–1 to eventual cup winners Everton.

=== Barcelona ===
However, after less than a year in England, he left Tottenham to sign for Spanish club Barcelona for £3 million, succeeding Ronald Koeman in the team. Popescu made his La Liga debut on 2 September 1995, opening the scoring in a 2–0 away win against Real Valladolid. In his first season, he played alongside compatriot Gheorghe Hagi and was coached by Johan Cruyff. He scored a total of five goals in his first season with the Catalans, including a brace in a 4–1 victory over UD Salamanca. Popescu also scored once in a 3–1 win over Sevilla in the round of 16 of the 1995–96 UEFA Cup, as Barça reached the semi-finals, where they were eliminated by eventual winners Bayern Munich.

In his second season, his former coach from PSV, Bobby Robson became Barcelona's manager, and made Popescu the club's captain ahead of veterans Pep Guardiola and Albert Ferrer, and superstars Ronaldo, Luis Figo, and Luis Enrique. In that season, Popescu helped Barcelona win a cup treble, starting with the 1996 Supercopa de España after a 6–5 aggregate win over Atlético Madrid. The Copa del Rey was won after a 3–2 win over Real Betis in the final. Then, in the Cup Winners' Cup he scored one goal against AIK Stockholm in the quarter-finals and played the first half of the 1–0 win in the final against Paris Saint-Germain.

=== Galatasaray ===
After leaving Barcelona in the summer of 1997, Popescu was transferred to Galatasaray in Turkey, where he reunited with Hagi, and with Romanians Adrian Ilie and Iulian Filipescu also at the club. He made his Turkish league debut on 31 July 1997 under coach Fatih Terim in a 0–0 draw against Ankaragücü, scoring his first goal in the competition on 26 September 1997 in a 4–1 home win over Şekerspor. In his first three seasons, he won three league titles, two Turkish Cups and the 1999–2000 UEFA Cup in May 2000 – where Galatasaray defeated Arsenal in the final on penalties after a goalless draw in open play. He scored the final penalty, defeating David Seaman in the shoot-out, and securing the victory.

In June 2000, Mircea Lucescu replaced Fatih Terim as coach, and the club clinched the 2000 UEFA Super Cup after a 2–1 victory against Real Madrid. They also reached the quarter-finals of the UEFA Champions League during the 2000–01 season, where after a 3–2 victory in the first leg, they lost 3–0 in the second leg against Real Madrid.

=== Lecce ===
In 2001, Popescu moved to Serie A club Lecce, stating in an interview with la Repubblica: "I think of Lecce as something romantic. It is the only team in Italy that comes from the south of the country. I am fascinated by the battle with the troops of the North. I would like to complete my two-year contract". He made his league debut on 26 August 2001 in the 1–1 draw against Parma. He wore the number 10 shirt, scoring a brace in a 4–3 loss to Bologna and one goal in his last appearance for I Lupi, which was a 1–1 draw against Torino.

=== Dinamo București ===
After 12 years, Popescu returned to his native Romania in 2002, signing with Dinamo București, and wearing the captain's armband from his first game, a 5–0 win over Ceahlăul Piatra Neamț on 17 August 2002. The following matches were less successful, as Popescu's performances and the club's results were disappointing in the eyes of the fans. In a derby against rivals Rapid București, he committed a handball, leading to a penalty, which resulted in losing the match. In his last game for the club, a 2–0 loss to Oțelul Galați, he struggled to contain Mihai Guriță, who scored both goals. After the match, fans chanted for Popescu to leave and told Giani Kiriță, the club's captain before Popescu's arrival, to tell him to leave. Kiriță applauded the supporters, a gesture that did not sit well with Popescu, who remarked: "In his place, I would have done it differently". The next day, Popescu terminated his contract with the club, stating: "I had to come to see for myself what is in Romanian football". He would later describe his transfer to Dinamo as "The mistake of my life".

=== Hannover 96 ===
His last club was the German side Hannover 96, where he made his Bundesliga debut on 8 February 2003, when coach Ralf Rangnick sent him at half-time to replace Kostas Konstantinidis in a 4–2 victory against FC Nürnberg. Popescu scored his only league goal when he opened the scoring in a 2–1 loss to Bayer Leverkusen. The final game of his career took place on 17 May 2003, ending in a 2–2 draw against Borussia Mönchengladbach, a result that earned Hannover the point that mathematically saved them from relegation. Popescu announced his retirement afterward, stating: "I feel tired, there is no point in taking money without working for it until 2004".

== International career ==
Popescu played 115 matches and scored 16 goals for Romania, making his debut on 20 September 1988 at age 20 under coach Emerich Jenei in a 3–0 friendly win over Albania.

=== 1990 World Cup ===
He played six matches and scored once with a header in a 1–0 victory over Bulgaria during the 1990 World Cup qualifiers. In the final tournament, where coach Jenei used him in all four matches, Romania was eliminated by Ireland on penalties in the round of 16. In the first game of the group stage, Popescu delivered a highly praised performance in the 2–0 win over the Soviet Union. The following day, his agent, Mircea Petescu, presented him with a contract offer from Real Madrid, which he ultimately declined in favor of PSV Eindhoven. AC Milan captain Franco Baresi stated that he considered Popescu the best sweeper of the tournament.

=== 1994 World Cup ===
He made seven appearances and scored one goal in a 4–1 victory over Cyprus during the 1994 World Cup qualifiers. In the final tournament group stage, Romania's "Golden Generation" earned victories over Colombia and the United States, then defeated Argentina 3–2 in the round of 16. Subsequently, they were eliminated by Sweden after the penalty shoot-out in the quarter-finals. Popescu played the full 90 minutes in all five games under coach Anghel Iordănescu.

=== Euro 1996 ===
Popescu played seven games, scoring the opening goal in the 3–2 win over Slovakia during the Euro 1996 qualifiers. He was used by Iordănescu in all three matches in the final tournament, which was unsuccessful as they lost to France, Bulgaria and Spain.

=== 1998 World Cup ===
During the 1998 World Cup qualifiers, he made eight appearances, scoring one goal against Iceland, a hat-trick against Macedonia and four goals against Liechtenstein, making him the side's top-scorer. Popescu played in all four games under Iordănescu in the final tournament. In the group stage, Romania earned victories in the first two rounds against Colombia and England, thus securing mathematical qualification before the last group match against Tunisia. To celebrate, the team dyed their hair blonde and showed up on the pitch with their new look. However, they were defeated 1–0 by Croatia in the round of 16 after Davor Šuker scored a penalty, which was awarded following a duel between Aljoša Asanović and Gabriel Popescu.

=== Euro 2000 ===
Popescu played nine games and scored one goal in the 7–0 win over Liechtenstein in the Euro 2000 qualifiers. Jenei used him as a starter in all three group-stage matches during the final tournament. In the last one, against England, he was made captain as Hagi was suspended, but he got injured after the first 30 minutes and was replaced by Miodrag Belodedici. The Tricolours defeated England 3–2 and qualified for the quarter-finals, where they lost 2–0 to Italy, with Popescu not playing.

=== Final years ===
In his final years with the national team, Popescu scored a goal in a 1–1 draw against Georgia during the 2002 World Cup qualifiers and played in both legs of the play-off against Slovenia, which ended in a 3–2 aggregate defeat. He played four matches in the Euro 2004 qualifiers, with the last one, a 5–2 home loss against Denmark on 29 March 2003, being his final appearance for Romania.

Popescu was given a send-off in a testimonial game on 18 May 2004, called "Seara Campionilor", featuring a team of international All-Stars against Romania's national team. For representing his country at five final tournaments, Popescu was decorated by the then President of Romania, Traian Băsescu, on 25 March 2008, with the Class III Sports Merit Order (Ordinul "Meritul Sportiv"). In 2022, the International Federation of Football History & Statistics (IFFHS) included Popescu in its "Romania's all-time dream team" first XI.

== Style of play ==
A highly intelligent defender who could play as a libero, center-back or as a defensive midfielder, Popescu is mostly known for captaining Barcelona during the mid 1990s. Known for his strong leadership skills, elegant tackles, distribution and passing skills, Popescu was fully capable of starting attacks from inside his own half. He was also a prominent goal-scoring defender, scoring 16 goals for the national team.

== After retirement ==
In 2000, he opened the "Gheorghe Popescu Football School" in Craiova, which developed players such as Ionuț Rada, Adrian Stoian, Sabrin Sburlea, Constantin Grecu and Ovidiu Burcă. For a while, he also worked as a sports agent.

In 2003, journalist Daniel Nanu released a book about him titled Gică Popescu - Viața mea (Gheorghe Popescu - My Life).

In 2010, Popescu was one of the founding members of Chindia Târgoviște through one of his companies, leaving the club in 2013. In 2019, he was appointed by Gheorghe Hagi as president at Viitorul Constanța, then when the club merged with Farul Constanța, he continued to work as president for the new club.

== Personal life ==
He is the brother-in-law of fellow Romanian international Gheorghe Hagi, as he married Hagi's wife's sister. His son Nicolas is also a footballer, as is his nephew Ianis Hagi – both of the younger men were born in Istanbul while their fathers were playing for Galatasaray.

In 1994, Popescu was named Honorary Citizen of Bucharest. In 2003, he received the Honorary Citizen of Craiova title.

=== Tax evasion and imprisonment ===
On 4 March 2014, Popescu and seven others, among them Mihai Stoica, were convicted by a Romanian appeals court of money laundering and tax evasion in connection with the transfer of football players from Romania to other countries. Popescu was sentenced to a jail term of three years and one month. He was released for good conduct on 4 November 2015, after serving half of his sentence. The books he wrote and published during his imprisonment also contributed to the reduction of his sentence, as is customary under Romanian law.

== Publications ==
During his time in prison, Popescu wrote four books in order to achieve a 120-day reduction in his sentence:

- Fotbal pentru viitori fotbaliști profesioniști (Football for future professional footballers)
- Personalitatea sportivului, condiție obligatorie pentru succesul în sport (The athlete's personality, a mandatory condition for success in sports)
- Considerații privind optimizarea strategiei de promovare a jocului de fotbal la nivel școlar (Considerations regarding the optimization of the strategy for promoting the game of football at the school level)
- Abordări teoretice și practico-metodice ale predării jocului de fotbal în centrele de copii și juniori din perspectivă interdisciplinară (Theoretical and practical-methodical approaches to teaching the game of football in children's and junior centers from an interdisciplinary perspective)

== Career statistics ==
=== Club ===
Appearances and goals by club, season and competition
Club	Season	League			National Cup		Other		Continental		Total	
Club	Season	Division	Apps	Goals	Apps	Goals	Apps	Goals	Apps	Goals	Apps	Goals
Universitatea Craiova	1984–85	Divizia A	2	0	0	0	–		0	0	2	0
Universitatea Craiova	1985–86	Divizia A	18	1	3	0	–		3 (Note: Appearances in the UEFA Cup Winners' Cup)	0	24	1
Universitatea Craiova	1986–87	Divizia A	31	1	2	1	–		4 (Note: Appearances in the UEFA Cup)	0	37	2
Universitatea Craiova	1987–88	Divizia A	14	1	0	0	–		2	0	16	1
Universitatea Craiova	1988–89	Divizia A	33	8	0	0	–		0	0	33	8
Universitatea Craiova	1989–90	Divizia A	26	7	3	1	–		0	0	29	8
Universitatea Craiova	Total		124	18	8	2	–		9	0	141	20
Steaua București (loan)	1987–88	Divizia A	13	1	4	2	–		3 (Note: Appearances in the UEFA Champions League)	0	20	3
PSV	1990–91	Eredivisie	30	5	3	1	–		2	0	32	6
PSV	1991–92	Eredivisie	29	7	1	0	–		3	0	32	7
PSV	1992–93	Eredivisie	24	6	2	0	1 (Note: Appearance in the Johan Cruijff Shield)	0	6	0	30	6
PSV	1993–94	Eredivisie	23	5	3	0	–		1	1	24	6
PSV	1994–95	Eredivisie	2	0	0	0	–		0	0	2	0
PSV	Total		108	23	9	1	1	0	12	1	130	25
Tottenham Hotspur	1994–95	Premier League	23	3	3	0	2 (Note: Appearances in the League Cup)	0	–		28	3
Barcelona	1995–96	La Liga	37	5	5	2	–		8	1	50	8
Barcelona	1996–97	La Liga	29	4	5	0	2 (Note: Appearances in the Supercopa de España)	0	8	1	44	5
Barcelona	Total		66	9	10	2	2	0	16	2	94	13
Galatasaray	1997–98	1.Lig	32	2	8	2	–		8	0	48	4
Galatasaray	1998–99	1.Lig	29	2	5	1	–		8	0	42	3
Galatasaray	1999–2000	1.Lig	25	2	3	0	1 (Note: Appearance in the Turkish Super Cup)	0	14 (Note: Eight appearances in the UEFA Champions League and six appearances in the UEFA Cup)	0	43	2
Galatasaray	2000–01	1.Lig	24	0	3	0	–		15 (Note: 14 appearances in the UEFA Champions League and one appearances in the UEFA Super Cup)	0	42	0
Galatasaray	2001–02	1.Lig	1	0	–		–		3	0	4	0
Galatasaray	Total		111	6	19	3	1	0	48	0	179	9
Lecce	2001–02	Serie A	28	3	0	0	–		–		28	3
Dinamo București	2002–03	Divizia A	8	0	0	0	–		–		8	0
Hannover 96	2002–03	Bundesliga	14	1	–		–		–		14	1
Career total			495	64	53	10	6	0	88	3	642	77

=== International ===
Appearances and goals by national team and year
National team	Year	Apps	Goals
Romania	1988	4	0
Romania	1989	8	1
Romania	1990	14	0
Romania	1991	6	0
Romania	1992	4	1
Romania	1993	4	0
Romania	1994	15	1
Romania	1995	5	0
Romania	1996	8	6
Romania	1997	7	4
Romania	1998	12	2
Romania	1999	8	0
Romania	2000	6	0
Romania	2001	5	1
Romania	2002	8	0
Romania	2003	1	0
Total		115	16

Scores and results list Romania's goal tally first, score column indicates score after each Popescu goal.

List of international goals scored by Gheorghe Popescu
No.	Date	Venue	Opponent	Score	Result	Competition
1	17 May 1989	Stadionul Steaua, Bucharest, Romania	Bulgaria	1–0	1–0	FIFA World Cup 1990 Qualifying
2	29 November 1992	Neo GSZ Stadium, Larnaca, Cyprus	Cyprus	1–0	4–1	FIFA World Cup 1994 Qualifying
3	12 November 1994	Stadionul Steaua, Bucharest, Romania	Slovakia	1–0	3–2	UEFA Euro 1996 Qualifying
4	1 June 1996	Stadionul Steaua, Bucharest, Romania	Moldova	2–0	3–1	Friendly
5	1 June 1996	Stadionul Steaua, Bucharest, Romania	Moldova	3–0	3–1	Friendly
6	9 October 1996	Laugardalsvöllur, Reykjavík, Iceland	Iceland	3–0	4–0	World Cup 1998 Qualifying
7	14 December 1996	Stadion Gradski Park, Skopje, Republic of Macedonia	Macedonia	1–0	3–0	World Cup 1998 Qualifying
8	14 December 1996	Stadion Gradski Park, Skopje, Republic of Macedonia	Macedonia	2–0	3–0	World Cup 1998 Qualifying
9	14 December 1996	Stadion Gradski Park, Skopje, Republic of Macedonia	Macedonia	3–0	3–0	World Cup 1998 Qualifying
10	29 March 1997	Stadionul Steaua, Bucharest, Romania	Liechtenstein	2–0	8–0	World Cup 1998 Qualifying
11	29 March 1997	Stadionul Steaua, Bucharest, Romania	Liechtenstein	3–0	8–0	World Cup 1998 Qualifying
12	29 March 1997	Stadionul Steaua, Bucharest, Romania	Liechtenstein	6–0	8–0	World Cup 1998 Qualifying
13	29 March 1997	Stadionul Steaua, Bucharest, Romania	Liechtenstein	8–0	8–0	World Cup 1998 Qualifying
14	6 June 1998	Stadionul Ilie Oană, Ploiești, Romania	Moldova	1–0	5–1	Friendly
15	2 September 1998	Stadionul Steaua, Bucharest, Romania	Liechtenstein	1–0	7–0	UEFA Euro 2000 Qualifying
16	6 October 2001	Stadionul Steaua, Bucharest, Romania	Georgia	1–1	1–1	World Cup 2002 Qualifying

== Honours ==
Steaua București

- Divizia A: 1987–88
- Cupa României: 1987–88

PSV Eindhoven

- Eredivisie: 1990–91, 1991–92
- Johan Cruijff Shield: 1992

Barcelona

- Copa del Rey: 1996–97
- Supercopa de España: 1996
- UEFA Cup Winners' Cup: 1996–97

Galatasaray

- 1.Lig: 1997–98, 1998–99, 1999–00
- Turkish Cup: 1998–99, 1999–00
- UEFA Cup: 1999–00
- UEFA Super Cup: 2000

Individual

- Romanian Footballer of the Year: 1989, 1990, 1991, 1992, 1995, 1996

== See also ==
- List of men's footballers with 100 or more international caps
- List of FC Barcelona captains
- List of foreign La Liga players
