= Benoît Ladrière =

Belgian footballer

Personal information
- Date of birth: 27 April 1987 (age 39)
- Place of birth: La Louvière, Belgium
- Height: 1.70 m (5 ft 7 in)
- Position: Defensive midfielder

Team information
- Current team: Châtelet

Youth career
- La Louvière

Senior career*
Years	Team	Apps	(Gls)
2006–2008	La Louvière		
2008–2009	Gent	0	(0)
2009–2012	Tubize	92	(15)
2012–2013	Waasland-Beveren	23	(2)
2013–2014	Avellino	10	(0)
2015–2016	Patro Eisden	13	(0)
2016–2017	Pepingen-Halle		
2017–	Châtelet		
- * Club domestic league appearances and goals as of 7 December 2015

Benoît Ladrière (born 27 April 1987) is a Belgian footballer who plays for Châtelet as a defensive midfielder.

== Club career ==
Ladrière made his senior debuts with hometown's La Louvière in Jupiler Pro League, but left the club in May 2008, signing with Gent a season later. After failing to feature with the first-team he moved to Tubize.

On 1 July 2012 Ladrière joined Waasland-Beveren, returning to the top division. He was released a season later.

In November 2013 Ladrière went on a trial at Serie B side Avellino, only signing with the Biancoverdi a month later.

In August 2015, he returned to Belgium and signed with the Belgian second division club Patro Eisden.
