= Alan Haydock =

Belgian footballer

Personal information
- Full name: Alan John Steve Haydock
- Date of birth: 13 January 1976 (age 50)
- Place of birth: Uccle, Belgium
- Height: 1.77 m (5 ft 10 in)
- Position: Midfielder

Senior career*
Years	Team	Apps	(Gls)
2000–2003	R.A.A. Louviéroise	53	(3)
2004–2008	F.C. Brussels	92	(2)
2008–2009	A.F.C. Tubize	32	(1)
- * Club domestic league appearances and goals

Alan John Steve Haydock (born 13 January 1976 in Uccle) is a Belgian former football player of British descent who played in the midfield.

He started his career with Diegem Sport in the lower divisions then moved to the defunct R.W.D. Molenbeek in 1994. Haydock scored a goal on his debut against AA Gent in 1995. In 2000, he moved to R.A.A. Louviéroise, another side from the Jupiler League where he played 3 seasons, won the Belgian Cup final in 2003 and participated in the UEFA Cup matches against Benfica the following year. In 2003, he joined F.C. Brussels, the de facto successor to his former club Molenbeek, where he stayed for five seasons and became club captain. On Brussels' relegation from the Jupiler League in 2008, he joined newly promoted A.F.C. Tubize.

Haydock was selected in the Belgium Under-21 national team on 6 occasions.
