= Nicolas Timmermans =

Belgian footballer

Personal information
- Full name: Nicolas Timmermans
- Date of birth: 4 November 1982 (age 44)
- Place of birth: Belgium
- Height: 1.83 m (6 ft 0 in)
- Positions: Centre-back; right-back

Team information
- Current team: FC Ganshoren

Senior career*
Years	Team	Apps	(Gls)
2000–2002	RWDM Brussels	11	(0)
2002–2003	KFC Strombeek	22	(1)
2003–2006	Lierse	28	(0)
2006–2008	Kortrijk	42	(5)
2008–2009	Westerlo	1	(0)
2009–2014	Mons	145	(6)
2014–2017	Eupen	53	(2)
2017–2019	RWDM47		
2019–	FC Ganshoren		
- * Club domestic league appearances and goals as of 29 December 2015

Nicolas Timmermans is a Belgian footballer who plays for FC Ganshoren as a right-back.
