= Bart Goossens =

Belgian footballer

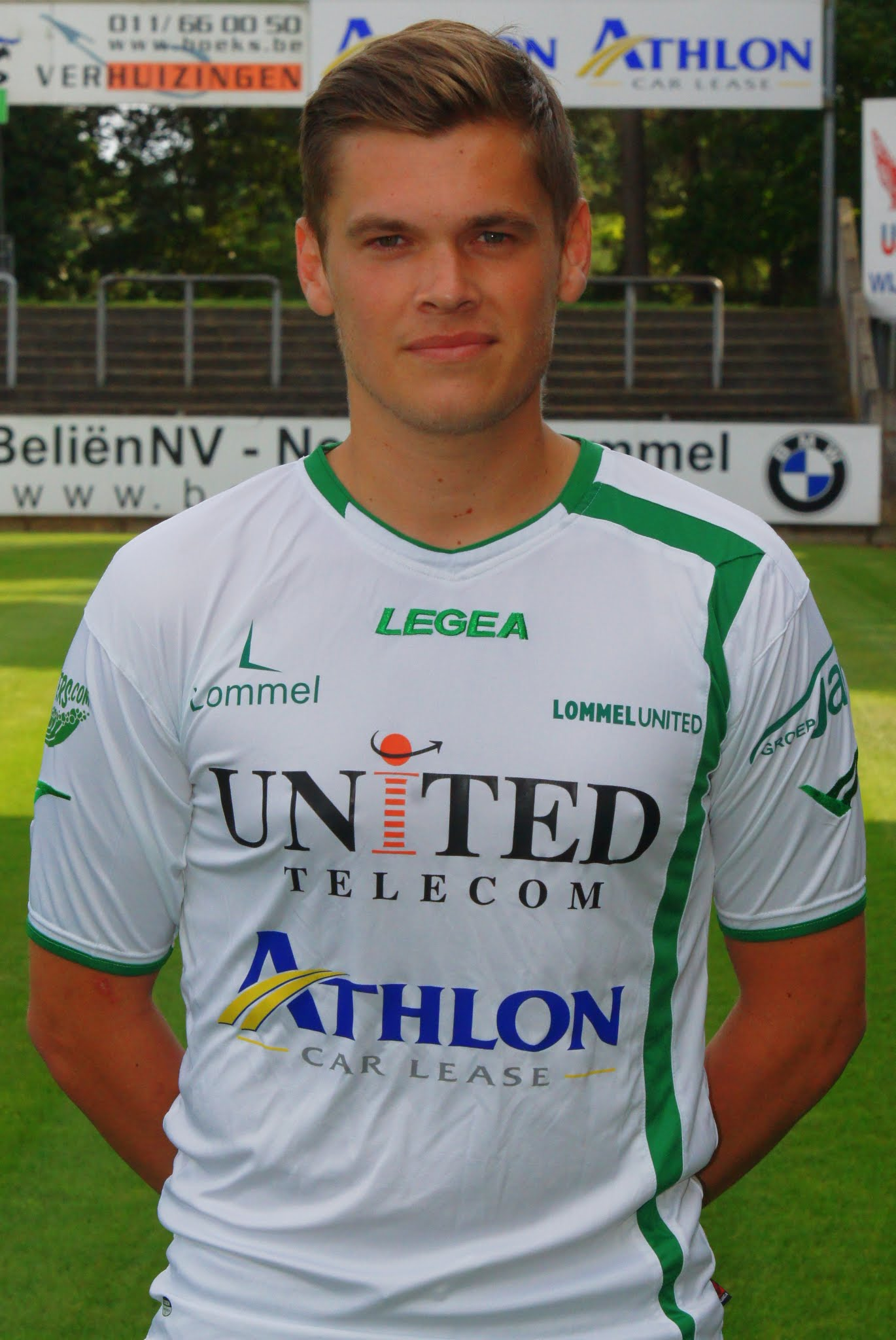

Personal information
- Date of birth: 5 January 1985 (age 41)
- Place of birth: Belgium
- Height: 1.78 m (5 ft 10 in)
- Position: Defender

Team information
- Current team: Lommel

Senior career*
Years	Team	Apps	(Gls)
2003–2005	Gent		
2004–2005	→ Hamme (loan)		
2005–2008	Hamme		
2008–2010	Roeselare		
2010–2012	Standaard Wetteren		
2012–	Lommel		
- * Club domestic league appearances and goals as of 17 July 2009 ‡ National team caps and goals as of 15 June 2009

Bart Goossens (born 5 January 1985) is a Belgian professional footballer who currently plays for Lommel in the Belgian Second Division, as a defender. His previous teams include Gent and Roeselare, with which he played in the Belgian Pro League.
