= Boubacar Dembélé =

French-Malian footballer (born 1982)

Personal information
- Date of birth: March 1, 1982 (age 44)
- Place of birth: Marcq-en-Baroeul, France
- Height: 1.78 m (5 ft 10 in)
- Position: Midfielder

Team information
- Current team: Romorantin
- Number: 19

Senior career*
Years	Team	Apps	(Gls)
?–2004	Le Havre AC B		
2004–2008	AS Beauvais Oise		
2008–2009	K.S.V. Roeselare	15	(1)
2009–2010	Évreux		
2010–2011	Martigues	17	(2)
2011–2013	Fréjus Saint-Raphaël	43	(0)
2013–	Romorantin	6	(2)
- * Club domestic league appearances and goals as of 17 July 2013

Boubacar Dembélé (born March 1, 1982) is a French footballer who plays for Romorantin. He also holds Malian citizenship.
