= Souleymane Mamam =

Togolese footballer

Personal information
- Date of birth: 30 June 1987 (age 39) or 20 June 1985 (age 41)
- Place of birth: Lomé, Togo
- Height: 1.77 m (5 ft 10 in)
- Position: Midfielder

Youth career
- 1998–1999: New Star du Zongo
- 1999–2001: Modèle Lomé
- 2001–2003: La Semeuse Lomé

Senior career*
Years	Team	Apps	(Gls)
2003–2007	Manchester United	0	(0)
2003–2007	→ Royal Antwerp (loan)	94	(8)
2007–2008	Royal Antwerp	15	(0)
2010–2011	K.R.C. Mechelen		
2011–2012	Nejmeh	21	(0)

International career
2001–2007	Togo	11	(0)
- * Club domestic league appearances and goals

Souleymane Mamam (born 30 June 1987) is a Togolese former professional footballer who played as an attacking midfielder or a winger. He is recognised by FIFA as the youngest player to play a senior football match, an international for Togo in 2001.

Mamam was signed by Manchester United as a teenager but never played for the club. He appeared at senior level for Royal Antwerp, K.R.C. Mechelen and Nejmeh SC and won eight caps for his country.

== Club career ==
Born in Lomé, Togo, Mamam played for local clubs in Lomé before signing for English club Manchester United in 2003. However, work permit regulations meant that it was not possible for Mamam to play in the United Kingdom and he was sent on loan to play at Royal Antwerp until he was eligible for a Belgian passport. At the end of the 2006–07 season, after four seasons of playing on loan for Antwerp, Manchester United decided not to renew his contract.

Having become a free agent, Mamam then signed a new one-year permanent deal with Royal Antwerp in time for the start of the 2007–08 season. He went on trial at Motherwell – who declined to sign Mamam in favour of another defender – and Birmingham City, but again failed to secure a deal due to work permit problems. He also went on trial with Toronto FC in the MLS in January 2010, before joining Belgian Third Division A team K.R.C. Mechelen until the end of the 2009–10 season.

Mamam returned to Manchester United on trial in August 2011, and played in a friendly for the club's reserve team against Morecambe on 1 August; he was substituted in the 53rd minute for Jesse Lingard, who scored the team's second goal in a 2–0 win. He then scored after 11 minutes of the reserves' next game against Llanelli at Parc y Scarlets on 8 August, but was substituted in the 58th minute.

He played for Nejmeh SC, after having been released by K.R.C. Mechelen in July 2010.

== International career ==
According to official FIFA records, on 6 May 2001, Mamam became the youngest player to ever play a World Cup qualifier when he played for the Togo national team against Zambia at the age of 13 years and 310 days. FIFA records give Mamam's date of birth as 30 June 1987; however, various websites, including the official website of Royal Antwerp, give 20 June 1985.

== Personal life ==
Mamam's brother Chérif Touré Mamam was also a footballer.

== Career statistics ==
=== International ===
Appearances and goals by national team and year
National team	Year	Apps	Goals
Togo	2001	3	0
Togo	2002	0	0
Togo	2003	0	0
Togo	2004	1	0
Togo	2005	2	0
Togo	2006	0	0
Togo	2007	5	0
Total		11	0
