= Rocky Peeters =

Belgian football manager and former player

Personal information
- Date of birth: 18 August 1979 (age 47)
- Place of birth: Herentals, Belgium
- Height: 1.98 m (6 ft 6 in)
- Position: Midfielder

Team information
- Current team: Belgium U19 (assistant)

Youth career
- 1983–1990: Linda Olen

Senior career*
Years	Team	Apps	(Gls)
1990–1997	Lierse	?	(?)
1997–2004	Verbroedering Geel	79	(9)
2000–2001	Zuid-West (loan)	22	(2)
2004–2006	Roeselare	41	(7)
2006–2008	Sint-Truidense	67	(9)
2008–2011	Germinal Beerschot	15	(0)
2009–2010	→ EN Paralimni (loan)	26	(2)
2011–2015	Tienen-Hageland	98	(6)
2015–2018	Olympia Wijgmaal	14	(6)

Managerial career
- 2013–2015: Tienen-Hageland (playing manager)
- 2017–2018: Olympia Wijgmaal (playing manager)
- 2018–2019: Olympia Wijgmaal
- 2019: Lierse Kempenzonen
- 2020–2021: Bocholt
- 2022–: Belgium U19 (assistant)
- * Club domestic league appearances and goals

Rocky Peeters (born 18 August 1979) is a Belgian professional football manager and former professional footballer, who is currently assistant coach of the Belgium U19s.
