= Josip Barišić (footballer, born 1981) =

Croatian footballer

Personal information
- Date of birth: 7 March 1981 (age 45)
- Place of birth: Slavonski Brod, SR Croatia, SFR Yugoslavia
- Height: 1.90 m (6 ft 3 in)
- Position: Defender

Youth career
- Marsonia

Senior career*
Years	Team	Apps	(Gls)
2000–2002	Marsonia	36	(1)
2002–2004	NK Zagreb	22	(0)
2004–2005	Karlovac	23	(0)
2005	Shonan Bellmare	35	(2)
2006	Croatia Sesvete		
2006–2007	Posušje	25	(1)
2007–2008	Croatia Sesvete	42	(3)
2008–2009	Tubize	26	(0)
2009–2011	Inter Zaprešić	38	(3)
2011–2012	Karlovac	9	(1)
2012–2014	Radnik Sesvete	18	(1)
- * Club domestic league appearances and goals as of 4 June 2022

Josip Barišić (born 7 March 1981 in Slavonski Brod) is a Croatian retired football player.
