= Adriano Duarte =

Brazilian footballer (born 1980)

Personal information
- Full name: Adriano Duarte Mansur da Silva
- Date of birth: 29 January 1980 (age 46)
- Place of birth: Ponte Nova, Brazil
- Height: 1.84 m (6 ft 0 in)
- Position: Defender

Team information
- Current team: Rio Branco

Youth career
- 1986–1999: Football en Salle "futsal" à Mineiro
- 1999–2001: Clube Atlético Mineiro

Senior career*
Years	Team	Apps	(Gls)
2004–2005	Atlético Mineiro	33	(0)
2005	Atlético Paranaense	6	(0)
2006	Juventude	0	(0)
2006	Nantes	0	(0)
2007–2008	Mons	39	(2)
2008–2011	Gent	26	(0)
2012	Vila Nova-GO		
2012	Democrata		
2013	Tupi	10	(0)
2014	Santa Rita	4	(0)
2015	Esportiva Guaxupé		
2016–	Rio Branco		
- * Club domestic league appearances and goals as of 6 February 2016

Adriano Duarte Mansur da Silva (born 29 January 1980 in Ponte Nova, Minas Gerais), known as Adriano Duarte, is a Brazilian football defender who plays for Rio Branco.

== Career ==
Previously, he played in his native country and in foreign clubs including French side Nantes, Belgian clubs Mons and Gent. As he did not get any opportunities to play in the team of the French First Division team, he decided to go to Belgium, where he started to play in the team of RAEC Mons. In his own country Duarte was crowned champion in 2001 with his team América Mineiro.
