= Nasser Daineche =

Algerian footballer (born 1982)

Personal information
- Date of birth: 6 May 1982 (age 44)
- Place of birth: Martigues, France
- Height: 1.92 m (6 ft 4 in)
- Position: Defender

Senior career*
Years	Team	Apps	(Gls)
2003–2004	SO Cassis Carnoux		
2004–2005	La Louvière	13	(0)
2005–2006	Le Havre B		
2006	Oldham Athletic	0	(0)
2006–2007	Istres	15	(0)
2008	Liège	14	(0)
2008	Roeselare	14	(0)
2009–2010	Marignane	21	(5)
2010–2011	FC Martigues	13	(2)
2011–2012	Fréjus Saint-Raphaël	13	(1)
2012–2017	FC Martigues	66	(2)
- * Club domestic league appearances and goals

Nasser Daineche (born 6 May 1982) is a French former professional footballer who played as a defender.

== Career ==
Dainech was born in Martigues, in the southeast of France. He holds French and Algerian nationalities.

On 17 May 2008, Daineche signed a one-year deal with K.S.V. Roeselare with an option for another year. He had previously played for La Louviere, Oldham Athletic, FC Istres, Le Havre AC and RFC Liège. In December 2008 he was released from his contract and became a free agent.
