= Sébastien Chabaud =

French footballer (born 1977)

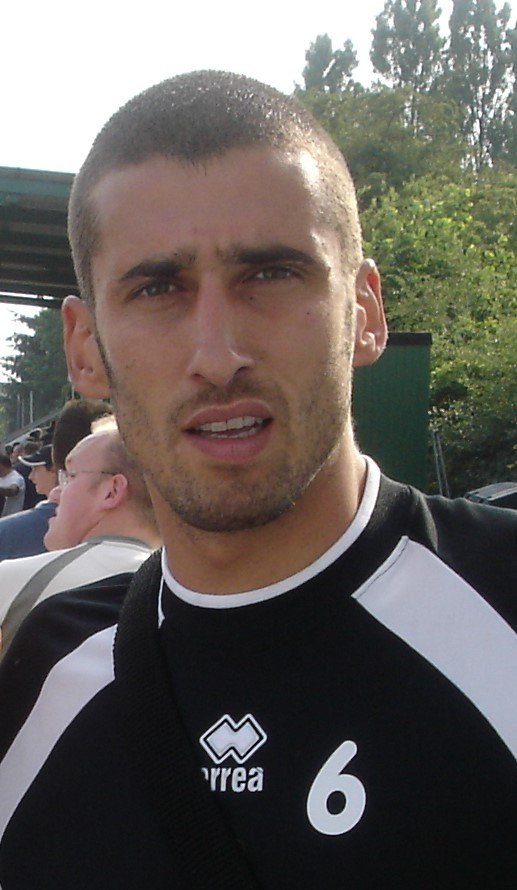

Personal information
- Full name: Sébastien Chabaud
- Date of birth: 9 March 1977 (age 49)
- Place of birth: Marseille, France
- Height: 1.77 m (5 ft 10 in)
- Position: Midfielder

Youth career
- 2002: K.F.C. Germinal Beerschot

Senior career*
Years	Team	Apps	(Gls)
1995–2000	AS Cannes	92	(7)
2000–2003	AS Nancy	98	(12)
2003–2006	Charleroi	97	(11)
2006–2007	Gimnàstic	20	(0)
2007–2008	Germinal Beerschot	5	(0)
2008–2010	Charleroi	24	(0)
- * Club domestic league appearances and goals as of July 10, 2009 ‡ National team caps and goals as of July 10, 2009

Sébastien Chabaud (born 9 March 1977) is a French former football player who used to play in the Belgian Jupiler League. His usual position was midfielder.

== Teams ==
- 1995-2000: AS Cannes
- 2000-2003: AS Nancy
- 2003-2006: Charleroi
- 2006-2007: Gimnàstic de Tarragona
- 2007-2008: Germinal Beerschot
- 2008–2010: Charleroi
