= Charly Konstantinidis =

Belgian footballer

Personal information
- Full name: Charalambos Konstantinidis
- Date of birth: 25 June 1985 (age 41)
- Place of birth: Charleroi, Belgium
- Height: 1.88 m (6 ft 2 in)
- Position: Goalkeeper

Team information
- Current team: RJS Heppignies-Lambusart-Fleurus
- Number: 12

Youth career
- 1990–1992: Marcinelle
- 1992–2003: ROC Charleroi
- 2003–2005: Charleroi

Senior career*
Years	Team	Apps	(Gls)
2005–2008	Mons	9	(0)
2008	Nea Salamis	2	(0)
2009	RESCEM	6	(0)
2009–2010	Boussu Dour Borinage	2	(0)
2010–	RJS Heppignies-Lambusart-Fleurus		
- * Club domestic league appearances and goals

Charalambos Konstantinidis (born 25 June 1985, in Charleroi) is a Belgian football player of Greek descent, he currently plays for RJS Heppignies-Lambusart-Fleurus.

== Career ==
Konstantinidis began his career 1990 with RES Couvin-Mariembourg, before was transferred in summer 1992 to R.O.C. de Charleroi-Marchienne, after eleven years with ROC Charleroi signed for local rival R. Charleroi S.C. He played two years in the youth side for Charleroi and joined than in 2005 to R.A.E.C. Mons in the Belgian First Division. He signed on 20 May 2008 for Nea Salamis and was in October 2008 released from his contract with the Cyprus club. He turned back to his homeland Belgium and signed for a half-year with Royale Entente Sportive Couvin-Mariembourg. In summer joined from Royale Entente Sportive Couvin-Mariembourg on 12 August 2009 to Boussu Dour Borinage.
