= Frank Boeckx =

Belgian footballer (born 1986)

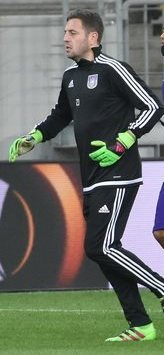

Personal information
- Date of birth: 27 September 1986 (age 40)
- Place of birth: Aarschot, Belgium
- Height: 1.80 m (5 ft 11 in)
- Position: Goalkeeper

Team information
- Current team: Anderlecht U21 (gk coach)

Youth career
- 1990–1994: KVO Aarschot
- 1994–2002: Lierse
- 2002–2003: Sint-Truiden

Senior career*
Years	Team	Apps	(Gls)
2003–2008	Sint-Truiden	43	(0)
2008–2014	Gent	54	(0)
2014–2015	Antwerp	29	(0)
2015–2020	Anderlecht	32	(0)

International career
2001–2002	Belgium U16	6	(0)
2002–2003	Belgium U17	6	(0)
2003–2004	Belgium U18	8	(0)
2004–2005	Belgium U19	9	(0)
2006–2007	Belgium U20	2	(0)
2007	Belgium U21	2	(0)

Managerial career
- 2019–: Anderlecht U21 (gk coach)
- * Club domestic league appearances and goals

Frank Boeckx (Dutch pronunciation: [frɑŋɡ ˈbuks]; (Note: In isolation, Frank is pronounced [frɑŋk].) born 27 September 1986) is a retired Belgian football goalkeeper. He became Sint Truiden's first-choice goalkeeper in February 2007, replacing Bart Deelkens between the posts. Before that he had also been playing in the teams of KVO Aarschot and Lierse SK. He was also named in a preliminary squad for the UEFA European Under-21 Championship in the Netherlands in the summer of 2007.

== Coaching career ==
Already in the summer of 2019, while still an active player, Boeckx was hired as goalkeeping coach for Anderlecht's U-21 team. In May 2020, Boeckx confirmed that he would hang up his boots as a player, but continue in his position as goalkeeping coach at the academy of Anderlecht. He later also functioned as a scout and football analyst.

== Statistics ==
Career

Season	Club	Country	Competition	Games	Goals
2003/04	Sint-Truiden	Belgium	First Division	12	0
2004/05	Sint-Truiden	Belgium	First Division	0	0
2005/06	Sint-Truiden	Belgium	First Division	8	0
2006/07	Sint-Truiden	Belgium	First Division	13	0
2007/08	Sint-Truiden	Belgium	First Division	10	0
2008/09	AA Gent	Belgium	First Division	2	0
2009/10	AA Gent	Belgium	First Division	0	0
2010/11	AA Gent	Belgium	First Division	-	-
2011/12	AA Gent	Belgium	First Division	14	0
