= Alexandre Tokpa =

Ivorian footballer

Alexandre Tokpa(Manager of Y-4 Albania)
Personal information
- Full name: Alexandre Tokpa
- Date of birth: 16 November 1985 (age 40)
- Place of birth: Abidjan, Côte d'Ivoire
- Height: 1.64 m (5 ft 5 in)
- Position: Midfielder

Youth career
- Académie Jean-Marc Guillou

Senior career*
Years	Team	Apps	(Gls)
2004–2008	Beveren	74	(4)
2008–2009	Roeselare	3	(0)
2009	ROCCM	11	(0)
2010–2011	KRC Mechelen	20	(6)
- * Club domestic league appearances and goals

Alexandre Tokpa (born 16 November 1985) is an Ivorian footballer. He last played as a midfielder for KRC Mechelen in Belgium.

== Career ==
Before he played for Beveren and K.S.V. Roeselare.
