= Alexandre Martinović =

French-born Montenegrin footballer (born 1985)

Personal information
- Full name: Aleksandar Martinović
- Date of birth: 31 May 1985 (age 41)
- Place of birth: Montbéliard, France
- Height: 1.93 m (6 ft 4 in)
- Position: Goalkeeper

Youth career
- 1995–2002: FC Sochaux-Montbéliard

Senior career*
Years	Team	Apps	(Gls)
2002–2006	Sochaux	3	(0)
2006–2011	AA Gent	5	(0)
2008–2009	→ Dender (loan)	7	(0)
2011	→ Hakoah Ramat Gan (loan)	11	(0)
2011–2012	Maccabi Netanya	5	(0)
2014–2018	La Chaux-de-Fonds	71	(0)
- * Club domestic league appearances and goals as of 17 July 2009

Alexandre Martinović (born 31 May 1985) is a retired football goalkeeper.

== Club career ==
He began his career by FC Sochaux-Montbéliard was 2002 promoted to first team, before in July 2006 joined to K.A.A. Gent, he played there three games in 3 years and moved on loan to FCV Dender in July 2008.
