= Twan Scheepers =

Dutch footballer (born 1971)

Personal information
- Date of birth: 8 November 1971 (age 54)
- Place of birth: Netherlands
- Position: Striker

Youth career
- –1986: De Spechten
- 1986–1989: PSV

Senior career*
Years	Team	Apps	(Gls)
1989–1993	PSV	38	(4)
1992–1993	→ MVV (loan)	24	(0)
1993–1995	MVV	55	(10)
1995–1998	NAC	54	(10)
1998–2000	Cambuur	22	(1)
2000–2003	Lommel	18	(1)
2003	FC Eindhoven	9	(1)
- * Club domestic league appearances and goals

Twan Scheepers (born 8 November 1971) is a Dutch football manager and former footballer who is the assistant manager of FC Utrecht.

== Early life ==
Scheepers was born in 1971 in the Netherlands. He joined the youth academy of Dutch side PSV at the age of fifteen.

== Career ==
Scheepers started his career with Dutch side PSV. He helped the club win the league. In 1993, he signed for Dutch side MVV. In 1995, he signed for Dutch side NAC. In 1998, he signed for Dutch side Cambuur. In 2000, he signed for Belgian side Lommel. In 2003, he signed for Dutch side FC Eindhoven.

== Personal life ==
Scheepers is a native of Eindhoven, the Netherlands. He obtained a UEFA A License.
