= Miguel Dachelet =

Belgian footballer (born 1988)

Personal information
- Date of birth: 16 January 1988 (age 38)
- Place of birth: Liège, Belgium
- Height: 1.81 m (5 ft 11 in)
- Positions: Right back; centre back

Team information
- Current team: Stockay
- Number: 4

Youth career
- Standard Liège

Senior career*
Years	Team	Apps	(Gls)
2008–2012	Zulte Waregem	54	(1)
2012–2013	Lierse	20	(0)
2013–2014	Heist	28	(0)
2015–2016	Seraing United	18	(0)
2016–2018	Meux	25	(1)
2019–2022	Wiltz 71	84	(7)
2022–2023	RS Waremmien FC	7	(0)
2023–	Stockay	83	(5)
- * Club domestic league appearances and goals as of 28 June 2026

Miguel Dachelet (born 16 January 1988) is a Belgian professional footballer who plays as a right back for Stockay.
