= Wim de Ron =

Dutch footballer (born 1969)

Personal information
- Date of birth: 23 August 1969 (age 57)
- Place of birth: Dinteloord, Netherlands
- Position: Goalkeeper

Senior career*
Years	Team	Apps	(Gls)
1991–1994	PSV	13	(0)
1994–2001	SC Cambuur		
2001–2003	RBC Roosendaal	49	(0)

International career
1985–1986	Netherlands U17	9	(0)
1987–1988	Netherlands U19	10	(0)
1990–1991	Netherlands U21	2	(0)
- * Club domestic league appearances and goals

Wim de Ron (born 23 August 1969) is a Dutch former professional footballer who played as a goalkeeper.

== Club career ==
=== PSV ===
De Ron played once at European level in the UEFA Champions League in 1993 at San Siro, losing 2–0 to AC Milan.

=== SC Cambuur ===
De Ron then signed for SC Cambuur in 1994, playing for them until 2001.

On 9 May 1999, he took a penalty in the away match against RKC Waalwijk, scoring the goal. In 2026, 27 years later, Ronald Koeman Jr. became the first goalkeeper to repeat the feat in a regular match.

=== RBC Roosendaal ===
De Ron finished his career at RBC Roosendaal.

== International career ==
De Ron was a Dutch youth international, playing at under-17, under-19, and under-21 levels.
