= Jasper Vermeerbergen =

Belgian footballer

Jasper Vermeerbergen (born 8 January 1988) is a Belgian football player. The defender currently plays for K.S.K. Beveren.

He made his debut in the Belgian First Division playing for K.F.C. Germinal Beerschot against R.A.E.C. Mons on 26 April 2008.
