= Mehdi Makhloufi =

French-Algerian footballer (born 1978)

Personal information
- Date of birth: 14 October 1978 (age 48)
- Place of birth: Roubaix, France
- Height: 1.84 m (6 ft 0 in)
- Position: Midfielder

Team information
- Current team: K.M.S.K. Deinze

Senior career*
Years	Team	Apps	(Gls)
1998–1999	Lille OSC	0	(0)
1999–2000	Pau FC	12	(1)
2000	RFC Tournai	12	(0)
2000–2001	Beveren	30	(5)
2001–2002	Cercle Brugge	27	(4)
2002–2004	CS Visé	32	(8)
2004	KV Oostende	28	(7)
2004–2007	KV Kortrijk	68	(16)
2007–2008	USL Dunkerque	13	(0)
2008	CS Grevenmacher	?	(?)
2008–	KMSK Deinze	0	(0)
- * Club domestic league appearances and goals as of December 11, 2008

Mehdi Makhloufi (born 14 October 1978 in Roubaix, France) is a French-Algerian footballer. He currently plays as a midfielder for KMSK Deinze in the Belgian Second Division.
