= Osahon Eboigbe =

Nigerian professional footballer

Personal information
- Full name: Osahon Eboigbe
- Date of birth: September 11, 1989 (age 37)
- Place of birth: Benin City, Nigeria
- Height: 5 ft 11 in (1.80 m)
- Position: Striker

Youth career
- Blackburn Rovers

Senior career*
Years	Team	Apps	(Gls)
2007–2010	Blackburn Rovers	0	(0)
2007–2008	→ Cercle Brugge (loan)	3	(0)
2008–2010	Cercle Brugge	0	(0)
2008–2010	→ OH Leuven (loan)	50	(8)
2010	Vaasan Palloseura	6	(0)
2013–2014	KSK Hasselt	0	(0)
2014–2015	Tempo Overijse	26	(12)
2015–2016	Berchem Sport	17	(2)
2016–2018	Tienen	0	(0)
- * Club domestic league appearances and goals as of 28 December 2015

Osahon "Macky" Eboigbe (born September 11, 1989) is a Nigerian professional footballer, who is currently unemployed after last playing for Tienen.

== Career ==
For the 2007–2008 season, Eboigbe was loaned from the Blackburn Rovers Youth Academy to Belgian first division side Cercle Brugge. The main reason for this move was because Eboigbe was due to turn 18 soon after, and as a consequence would be needing documents necessary to be eligible to play in English football as a non-EU player, documents which he would not receive. In Belgium, these regulations in football are far less strict.

Dwight Wille, who was also in the Rovers' Youth Academy in 2006–07, stated that in his view, Osahon Eboigbe was one of the most promising players in the Blackburn Rovers U-19 team. Macky made his début for Cercle on December 8, 2007, against Exc. Mouscron. Cercle won the match 3–0.

First was announced that Eboigbe would also be part of the Cercle Brugge squad for the 2008–09 season, but eventually Eboigbe went on trial with OH Leuven and was loaned out for 1 season to the Belgian second division side. His loan was extended with another season after 2008–09 until the summer of 2010. He is known as a pacy striker.

After a brief stint in the Belgian top league with Cercle Brugge, Eboigbe played for OH Leuven, K. Berchem Sport and K.V.K. Tienen-Hageland in the lower leagues.

== Personal life ==
Osahon Eboigbe also has an older brother, Semi Eboigbe, who is a professional basketball player, currently playing for Lynn Fury.
