= Biercée =

Section of Thuin, Belgium

Coordinates: 50°19′N 4°15′E

Biercée (French pronunciation: [bjɛʁse]; Walloon: Biercêye) is a village of Wallonia and a district of the municipality of Thuin, located in the province of Hainaut, Belgium.
