= Michaël Wiggers =

Belgian footballer

Personal information
- Date of birth: 8 February 1980 (age 46)
- Place of birth: Liège, Belgium
- Height: 1.82 m (6 ft 0 in)
- Position: Right back

Senior career*
| Years | Team | Apps | (Gls) |
| –2003 | Liège | 4 | (0) |
| 2003–2005 | Virton | | |
| 2005–2006 | Zulte Waregem | 5 | (0) |
| 2006–2007 | Mons | 43 | (1) |
| 2008–2010 | FCV Dender EH | 22 | (0) |
| 2010–2012 | Dudelange | 42 | (1) |
| 2012–2014 | Sprimont Comblain | 36 | (0) |
| 2014–2015 | RRC Stockay-Warfusée | | |
- * Club domestic league appearances and goals

Michaël Wiggers (born 8 February 1980) is a Belgian former professional footballer who played as a right-back for a number of clubs in Belgium.
