= Dieter Wittesaele =

Belgian footballer

Personal information
- Full name: Dieter Wittesaele
- Date of birth: 21 January 1989 (age 37)
- Place of birth: Ostend, Belgium
- Height: 1.90 m (6 ft 3 in)
- Position: Striker

Team information
- Current team: VK Westhoek

Youth career
- K.W.S. Oudenburg
- Cercle Brugge

Senior career*
| Years | Team | Apps | (Gls) |
| 2006–2007 | Cercle Brugge | 1 | (0) |
| 2007–2008 | Gent | 1 | (0) |
| 2008–2009 | FCV Dender EH | 18 | (3) |
| 2009–2012 | KV Oostende | 12 | (0) |
| 2012–2014 | KFC Izegem | 95 | (24) |
| 2014– | VK Westhoek | | |
- * Club domestic league appearances and goals as of 22 December 2015

Dieter Wittesaele (born 21 January 1989 in Ostend) is a Belgian football player currently playing for VK Westhoek.

== Career ==
The forward played previously for K.W.S. Oudenburg, Cercle Brugge K.S.V., K.A.A. Gent, FCV Dender EH and KV Oostende.
