= Bertin Tomou =

Cameroonian footballer (born 1978)

Personal information
- Full name: Bertin Tomou Bayard
- Date of birth: August 8, 1978 (age 48)
- Place of birth: Bafoussam, West Province, Cameroon
- Height: 1.89 m (6 ft 2 in)
- Position: Striker

Senior career*
Years	Team	Apps	(Gls)
1996–1997	PWD Bamenda	6	(14)
1997	Pohang Steelers	3	(4)
1998–1999	Shenzhen Ping'an	23	(7)
1999	→ Yunnan Hongta (loan)		(6)
2000–2001	Yunnan Hongta	5	(0)
2001	→ Guangzhou Geely (loan)	7	(9)
2002–2003	Zhejiang Greentown	34	(14)
2004	Xiamen Lanshi	26	(15)
2005	Zhejiang Lucheng	22	(12)
2006	Brest	15	(3)
2006–2008	Mouscron	52	(18)
2008–2009	Westerlo	44	(8)
2010	KSV Roeselare	9	(1)
2011–2012	Vaires-sur-Marne		
2012–2013	KRC Waregem	31	(15)
2013–2014	RFC Huy	28	(4)
2014–2015	RE Bertrigeoise		

International career
2004–2009	Cameroon	20	(6)

Managerial career
- 2016: RFC Huy (B-team & U17 manager)
- 2016–201?: FC Herstal (youth)
- 2019–2020: RFC Huy (youth)
- 2020–2021: RFC Huy
- 2021–2023: Ans-Montegnée
Medal record
Men's football
Representing Cameroon
Africa Cup of Nations
Runner-up	2008 Ghana
- * Club domestic league appearances and goals

Bertin Tomou Bayard (born August 8, 1978) is a Cameroonian former professional footballer who played as a striker. He represented the Cameroon national team at international level.

== Football career ==
Born in Bafoussam, Tomou started his career at PWD Bamenda, and left for East Asia in 1997. He first played for Pohang Steelers in South Korea, and then went to China in 1998. He received his first cap for Cameroon in 2004.

He moved to Europe to play for Stade Brestois 29 in Ligue 2 in January 2006.

== Coaching career ==
After retiring at the end of 2015, Tomou returned to RFC Huy, where he was appointed youth coordinator, U17 manager and later also manager of the clubs reserve team. He left the club again in November 2016. In December 2016, he was hired by FC Herstal in a position at the clubs youth sector.

In August 2019, Tomou returned to RFC Huy in a position as youth coordinator. In May 2020, he was promoted to manager of the clubs first team. In February 2020, he left RFC Huy to join Ans-Montegnée as manager of the clubs first team. He left Ans-Montegnée at the end of the 2022-23 season.

== Honours ==
Cameroon

- Africa Cup of Nations: runner-up, 2008
