= Johan Sotil =

Peruvian footballer (born 1982)

Personal information
- Full name: Johan Joussep Sotil Eche
- Date of birth: August 29, 1982 (age 44)
- Place of birth: Lima, Peru
- Height: 1.70 m (5 ft 7 in)
- Positions: Attacking midfielder; winger

Youth career
- Universitario

Senior career*
Years	Team	Apps	(Gls)
2000–2004	Universitario	84	(11)
2004	Alianza Atletico	21	(2)
2005	Universitario	4	(0)
2005	Coronel Bolognesi	7	(1)
2006	Union Huaral	24	(1)
2007	Alianza Lima	17	(2)
2008	José Gálvez	19	(5)
2008–2009	Westerlo	7	(1)
2009	Brussels	0	(0)
2009	José Gálvez	11	(1)
2010–2011	Sport Huancayo	62	(9)
2012–2013	Univ. César Vallejo	62	(4)
2014	UT Cajamarca	22	(1)
2015	León de Huánuco	23	(0)
2016	Comerciantes Unidos	14	(0)
2017	Santa Rosa	8	(0)
2018	Sport Loreto	22	(4)
2019	Santos de Nasca	20	(1)
2020	Unión Huaral	6	(0)

International career
2003–2011	Peru	2	(0)
- * Club domestic league appearances and goals as of 13:56, 17 July 2021 (UTC)

Johan Joussep Sotil Eche (born August 29, 1982) is a Peruvian footballer. He can play on either wing on the pitch.

Johan is the son of FC Barcelona player Hugo Sotil (1949–2024). Johan took his name from his godfather, former FC Barcelona player Johan Cruijff.

== Club career ==
He was attached to Belgian Jupiler League side VC Westerlo, with whom he signed a contract on June 14, 2008.
