= Tim Vleminckx =

Belgian footballer

Tim Vlemninckx
Personal information
- Full name: Timothy Vleminckx
- Date of birth: 31 March 1987 (age 39)
- Place of birth: Antwerp, Belgium
- Height: 1.82 m (6 ft 0 in)
- Position: Defender

Team information
- Current team: KSV Bornem
- Number: 2

Youth career
- 2002–2003: Malines
- 2003–2005: GBA

Senior career*
Years	Team	Apps	(Gls)
2005–2007	GBA	3	(0)
2008	Lier	12	(0)
2008	VW Hamme	66	(1)
2009–2010	Standaard Wetteren	20	(0)
2010–2011	KSV Bornem	2	(0)
- * Club domestic league appearances and goals

Tim Vleminckx (Dutch pronunciation: [tɪɱ ˈvleːmɪŋks]; born 31 March 1987) is a Belgian football player who plays as a right back for KSV Bornem.

For the 2007/08 season he was on loan to Lierse SK from K.F.C. Germinal Beerschot. Vleminckx previously played for Germinal in the Belgian First Division.
