= Tom Van Mol =

Belgian footballer

Personal information
- Date of birth: 12 October 1972 (age 54)
- Place of birth: Dendermonde, Belgium
- Height: 1.83 m (6 ft 0 in)
- Position: Defender

Youth career
- 1981–1982: Sparta Buggenhout
- 1982–1991: Anderlecht

Senior career*
Years	Team	Apps	(Gls)
1991–1992	PSV	9	(0)
1992–1993	Sparta	34	(2)
1993–1994	PSV	39	(1)
1995–1997	Lommel	66	(5)
1997–2004	Utrecht	138	(10)
2004–2008	Cercle Brugge	103	(1)
2008–2010	Sint-Niklaas		
- * Club domestic league appearances and goals

Tom Van Mol (born 12 October 1972) is a Belgian former professional footballer as a defender.

== Career ==
Van Mol started playing football for his local team, Sparta Buggenhout. Only one year later, he moved to the youth teams of Anderlecht. He never managed to break through there and in 1991, Van Mol was transferred to PSV. He played 9 times for PSV that season, and one year later he moved on to Sparta. This was the first team where Van Mol would obtain a place in the starting eleven. As a result, Tom Van Mol regained the interest of PSV, where he would also manage to break through in the 1993–94 season, appearing 39 times for PSV, scoring once. Nevertheless, in the next season Van Mol would return to Belgium, playing for Lommel SK. This only lasted for two seasons. Van Mol was transferred to FC Utrecht where he would stay from 1997 until 2004. From 2004 he played for the Belgian Cercle Brugge. On 6 May 2008, it was announced that he had signed a contract with third-tier club FCN Sint-Niklaas.

After retiring, he has worked for a clothing company and done scouting work for Anderlecht.
