= Daan Vaesen =

Belgian footballer

Personal information
- Full name: Daan Vaesen
- Date of birth: 11 July 1981 (age 45)
- Place of birth: Tongeren, Belgium
- Height: 1.83 m (6 ft 0 in)
- Position: Defender

Team information
- Current team: Duffel

Youth career
- 1986–1990: FC Nerem
- 1991–1999: K.S.K. Tongeren

Senior career*
Years	Team	Apps	(Gls)
1999–2003	K.S.K. Tongeren	?	(?)
2003–2005	K.R.C. Genk	13	(0)
2005–2008	K.S.V. Roeselare	91	(7)
2008–2010	K. Sint-Truidense V.V.	25	(1)
2009–2010	→ OH Leuven (loan)	25	(2)
2010–2013	FCV Dender EH	86	(8)
2013–2015	KRC Mechelen	56	(8)
2015–2016	Duffel	0	(0)
- * Club domestic league appearances and goals

Daan Vaesen (born 11 July 1981) is a retired Belgian footballer.

== Career ==
In July 2008 he moved from K.S.V. Roeselare to K. Sint-Truidense V.V.
