= Jo Vermast =

Belgian footballer

Personal information
- Full name: Johannes Vermast
- Date of birth: 29 September 1981 (age 45)
- Place of birth: Ostend, Belgium
- Height: 1.81 m (5 ft 11 in)
- Position: Midfielder

Team information
- Current team: K.V. Kortrijk
- Number: 8

Youth career
- –1991: K.V. Oostende
- 1991–2001: Club Brugge

Senior career*
Years	Team	Apps	(Gls)
2001–2002	Club Brugge	0	(0)
2002–2003	K.M.S.K. Deinze	21	(3)
2003–2005	K.V. Oostende	41	(19)
2005	S.V. Zulte Waregem	1	(0)
2006	K.F.C. Verbroedering Geel	12	(6)
2006–2007	K.V. Kortrijk	32	(6)
2007–2008	MVV	35	(6)
2008–	K.V. Kortrijk	12	(0)
- * Club domestic league appearances and goals as of 17 July 2009

Jo Vermast (born 29 September 1981 in Ostend) is a Belgium football midfielder who currently plays for KV Kortrijk. He joined MVV in 2007, he came from K.V. Kortrijk.
