= Lander Van Steenbrugghe =

Belgian footballer

Personal information
- Date of birth: 27 November 1986 (age 39)
- Place of birth: Oudenaarde, Belgium
- Height: 1.77 m (5 ft 10 in)
- Position: Midfielder

Team information
- Current team: KVVV Ardennen

Youth career
- 2004–2005: Zulte Waregem

Senior career*
Years	Team	Apps	(Gls)
2005–2011	Zulte Waregem	35	(0)
2008–2010	→ OH Leuven (loan)	59	(2)
2010–2011	→ Roeselare (loan)	25	(0)
2011–2013	Oostende	35	(0)
2013–2014	Eendracht Aalst	4	(0)
2014–	KVVV Ardennen		
- * Club domestic league appearances and goals as of 28 December 2015

Lander Van Steenbrugghe (born 27 November 1986 in Oudenaarde) is a Belgian footballer, who is currently playing for KVVV Ardennen in the Belgian Provincial leagues.

== Career ==
At Zulte Waregem, Van Steenbrugghe played 35 matches at the highest level of Belgian football between 2005 and 2008, winning also the 2005–06 Belgian Cup. The season thereafter he also played three matches in the 2006–07 UEFA Cup. Zulte Waregem sent Van Steenbrugghe out on loan to Belgian Second Division team OH Leuven for the 2008–09 season, a loan which was extended by another season until the summer of 2010. Thereafter, he moved to Roeselare, before signing with Oostende in November 2011. In the summer of 2013, after just being promoted with Oostende to the Belgian Pro League, Van Steenbrugghe moved to Eendracht Aalst.
