= Nathan D'Haemers =

Belgian footballer

Personal information
- Full name: Nathan D'Haemers
- Date of birth: 26 January 1978 (age 48)
- Place of birth: Evergem, Belgium
- Height: 1.81 m (5 ft 11 in)
- Position: Attacking midfielder

Senior career*
Years	Team	Apps	(Gls)
1996–1998	KSK Lovendegem		
1999–2008	Zulte-Waregem	191	(28)
2008–2010	KSK Beveren		
2010–2013	KSK Lovendegem		
2013–2014	Eendracht Zele		
2014–2016	KFC Evergem Center		

International career
2006	Belgium	1	(0)
- * Club domestic league appearances and goals

Nathan D'Haemers (born 26 January 1978 in Evergem) is a retired Belgian football player.
