= Chemcedine El Araichi =

Belgian-Moroccan football manager and former player

Personal information
- Full name: Chemcedine El Araichi
- Date of birth: 18 May 1981 (age 45)
- Place of birth: Mons, Hainaut, Belgium
- Height: 1.80 m (5 ft 11 in)
- Position: Defender

Team information
- Current team: Quévy-Mons (assistant)

Youth career
- 1995–1999: Mons

Senior career*
Years	Team	Apps	(Gls)
1999–2004	Mons	93	(0)
2004–2008	Roeselare	109	(2)
2008–2010	Mouscron	45	(2)
2010	Győri ETO	1	(0)
2010–2011	Kortrijk	19	(1)
2011–2014	Boussu Dour	92	(11)
2014–2015	Royal Géants Athois		
2015–2016	Royal Francs-Borains		

International career
2009	Morocco	3	(0)

Managerial career
- 2015–2016: Royal Francs-Borains (player-manager)
- 2016–2019: Royal Francs-Borains (assistant)
- 2019–: Quévy-Mons (assistant)
- * Club domestic league appearances and goals

Chemcedine El Araichi (born 18 May 1981) is a retired Belgian-Moroccan football player and currently the assistant manager of Royal Albert Quévy-Mons.

== Coaching career ==
On 19 June 2019, El Araichi was appointed assistant manager of Luigi Nasca at Quévy-Mons.

== Statistics ==
Season	Club	Country	Competition	Games	Goals
2002/03	RAEC Mons	Belgium	Jupiler League	19	0
2003/04	RAEC Mons	Belgium	Jupiler League	23	0
2004/05	KSV Roeselare	Belgium	Belgian Second Division	29	1
2005/06	KSV Roeselare	Belgium	Jupiler League	26	0
2006/07	KSV Roeselare	Belgium	Jupiler League	29	1
2007/08	KSV Roeselare	Belgium	Jupiler League	25	0
2008/09	Excelsior Mouscron	Belgium	Jupiler League	31	1
2009/10	Excelsior Mouscron	Belgium	Jupiler League	14	1
2009/10	Győri ETO FC	Hungary	Soproni Liga	1	0
2010/11	Kortrijk	Belgium	Jupiler League	0	0
			Total	278	4

== International career ==
El Araichi earned his first cap for Morocco during a Friendly against Czech Republic on 11 February 2009 played in Morocco and finished 0–0.
