= RRC Péruwelz =

Belgian football club

- Full name: Royal Racing Club Péruwelz
- Founded: 1922; 104 years ago
- Dissolved: 2010; 16 years ago (merged to Royal Mouscron-Péruwelz)
- League: Belgian Third Division
- 2010–11: 18th, Division 3B

Royal Racing Club Péruwelz was a Belgian association football club from the city of Péruwelz, Hainaut founded in 1922. They played at Verte Chasse, Péruwelz in the third division B until 2010–11 season when they moved to nearby Mouscron as part of an arrangement that saw them merged with bankrupt Royal Excelsior Mouscron. The new club became known as Royal Mouscron-Péruwelz.

== History ==
The club was founded in 1922 as RC Péruwelz and received the matricule number 216 from the Belgian Football Association. The club first reached the national level in 1936 (called Promotion at the time, but corresponding to the third level overall in Belgian football), to be relegated the next year to the Belgian Provincial leagues. In 1972 the club received the royal prefix. After a couple of seasons at the lowest level of Belgian football, between 1995 and 1997, they reached the national level once again in 2004. Two years later, Péruwelz were promoted to the third division where they stayed until merged with Royal Excelsior Mouscron in 2010 becoming Royal Mouscron-Péruwelz. They would later promote to the Belgian Pro League (its top tier debut, after winning the 2014 promotion play-offs as a Second Division club).
