= Royale Union Tubize-Braine =

Belgian football club

Tubize-Braine
- Full name: Royale Union Tubize Braine-le-Comte
- Nicknames: Les Blancs et Or (The White and Gold)
- Founded: 1919; 107 years ago as Cercle Sportif Tubizien (earliest predecessor); 2 February 1953; 73 years ago as Club Sportif Espérance Tubize (matricule); 1 July 1990; 36 years ago as Association Football Clubs Tubize; 1 July 2021; 5 years ago as Royale Union Tubize Braine-le-Comte
- Ground: Stade Leburton, Tubize
- Capacity: 8,100
- Chairman: François Le Château
- Manager: Dražen Brnčić
- League: Belgian National Division 1
- 2023–24: Belgian Division 2 ACFF, 3rd of 18 (promoted)
Home colours	Away colours

Royale Union Tubize Braine-le-Comte, also known as Royale Union Tubize-Braine, Tubize-Braine, or RUTB, is a Belgian football club based in the cities of Tubize and Braine-le-Comte. The team is set to play in Belgian National Division 1 from 2024–25, third tier of Belgian football after promotion from Belgian Division 2 in 2023–24.

== History ==
The club was founded in 1990 as A.F.C. Tubize, the result of the merger of F.C. Tubize and Amis Réunis de Tubize. A.F.C. Tubize was last promoted to the Belgian First Division in 2008, being relegated back in 2009. In 2021, the club merged with neighboring Stade Brainois, from Braine-le-Comte, to form Royale Union Tubize Braine-le-Comte, which involved a new logo and a change of colors, from blood red and gold to white and gold.

In 2023–24, Tubize-Braine secured promotion to Belgian Division 1 for the next season after finishing third place in Belgian Division 2.

Crest of A.F.C. Tubize used from 1990 to 2014

Crest of A.F.C. Tubize from 2014 until 2021

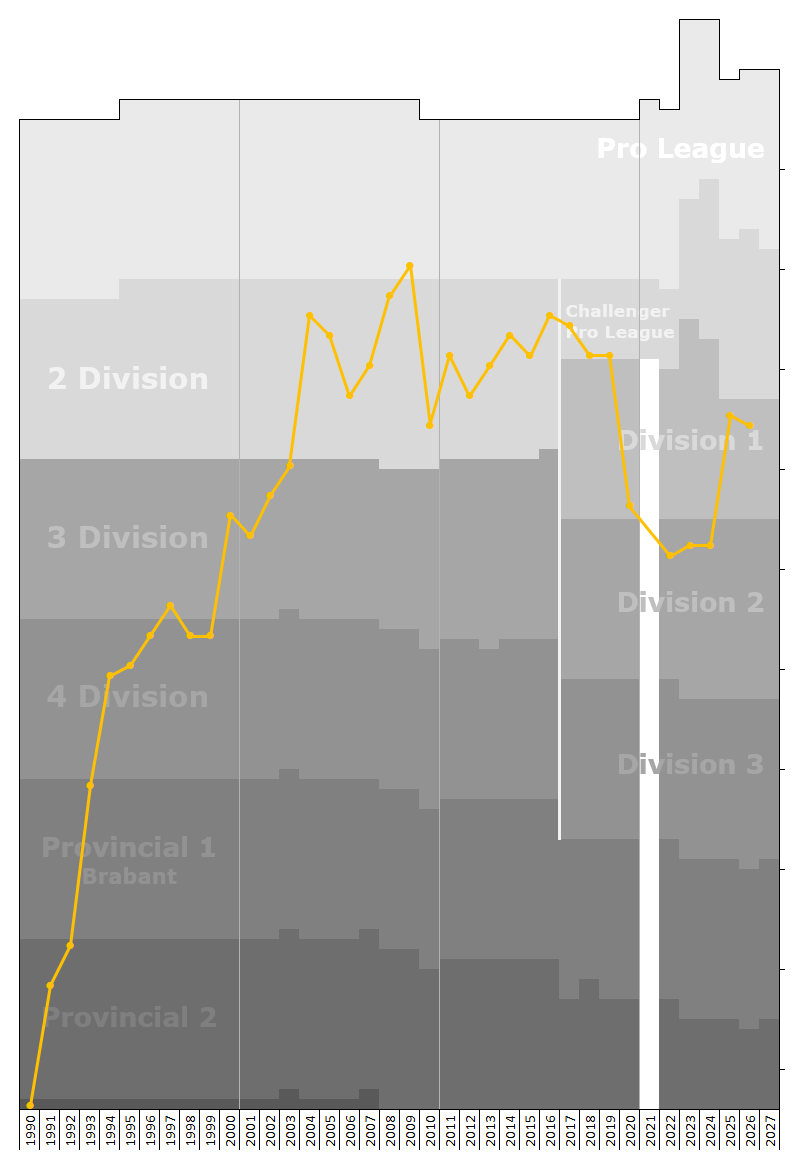
Historical chart of Tubize league performance

== Players ==
=== Current squad ===
As of 5 February 2026

Note: Flags indicate national team as defined under FIFA eligibility rules; some limited exceptions apply. Players may hold more than one non-FIFA nationality.

No.	Pos.	Nation	Player
1	GK	BEL	Aboubacar Camara
2	DF	BEL	Ayoub Kouri
3	DF	FRA	Lorenzo Prso
4	DF	NED	Joey Tshitoku
5	DF	BEL	Louis Delhaye
6	MF	BEL	Lorenzo Butera
7	MF	BEL	Shean Garlito
8	MF	BEL	Serhat Tepe
9	MF	BEL	Ethan Hazard
10	MF	BEL	Axel Lauwrensens
11	DF	COD	Emmanuel Salazaku
14	MF	BEL	Maxime Migliore
15	DF	BEL	Jonathan Hendrickx
16	MF	FRA	Enzo Grasso

No.	Pos.	Nation	Player
17	MF	BEL	Oleg Kuchinska
18	MF	POL	Allan Delferriere
23	GK	MAR	Elias Mago
26	MF	BEL	Quentin Vanderbecq
27	GK	FRA	Ulric Cremers
32	FW	SLO	Nicolas Rajsel
49	DF	BEL	Luka Hoedaert
64	DF	MTN	Demba Yatera
67	MF	POL	Krystian Borecki
71	FW	BEL	Tyron Crame
77	FW	BEL	Ismaël El Omari (captain)
87	FW	BEL	Jesse Mputu
96	FW	BEL	Lucas Walbrecq (on loan from RAEC Mons)

=== Out on loan ===
Note: Flags indicate national team as defined under FIFA eligibility rules; some limited exceptions apply. Players may hold more than one non-FIFA nationality.

No.	Pos.	Nation	Player

=== Notable former players ===
Eden Hazard and his brothers Thorgan, Kylian, and Ethan grew up in Braine-le-Comte, and the older two began their careers at Stade Brainois before moving to A.F.C. Tubize, while the younger two begam at A.F.C. Tubize, all at youth level. Only Ethan stuck with Tubize-Braine until the senior team, though he left in 2026; Kylian briefly returned to the club from 2024 to 2025, while the other two only played for either predecessor at youth level.

== Staff ==
As of 6 July 2017

Position	Staff
Head coach	Philippe Thys
Assistant manager	Damien Januel
Goalkeeping coach	Thierry Berghmans
Fitness coach	Romain Bolly
Youth coach	Daré Nibombé
