= 2006–07 RSC Anderlecht season =

R.S.C. Anderlecht
2006–07 season
- Chairman: Roger Vanden Stock
- Manager: Franky Vercauteren
- Stadium: Constant Vanden Stock Stadium
- Belgian First Division: 1st
- Belgian Cup: Semi-finals
- Belgian Super Cup: Winners
- UEFA Champions League: Group stage

During the 2006–07 R.S.C. Anderlecht season, the club competed in the Belgian Pro League, Belgian Cup, Belgian Supercup and UEFA Champions League.

== Results ==
Results for Anderlecht for 2006–07.

=== Friendly matches ===
Date	Venue	Opponents	Result	Score	Anderlecht scorers
5 July 2006	Olivierstadion, Knokke	Knokke	W	0–5	Deschacht, Legear, Mpenza, Van Damme, Vanden Borre
8 July 2006	Den Dreef, Leuven	OH Leuven	W	2–4	Lamah (2), Allagui, Siani
13 July 2006	Wals Siezenheim Stadium, Salzburg	Red Bull Salzburg	L	2–0	
15 July 2006	Wals Siezenheim Stadium, Salzburg	Olympiacos	W	1–2	Boussoufa, Vanden Borre
19 July 2006	Bielmontstadium, Verviers	Alemannia Aachen	L	4–1	Hassan
26 July 2006	Stadion Jos Van Wellen, Kapellen	Cappellen	D	1–1	Legear
10 August 2006	Olympic Stadium, Athens	Panathinaikos	L	1–0	
15 August 2006	Prinsenbosstadion, Grimbergen	Grimbergen	W	0–5	Allagui, Boateng, Frutos, Mpenza, Tchité
3 September 2006	Stadio Olimpico, Rome	Lazio	L	3–2	Akin, Legear
24 October 2006	Campus Kruikenburg, Ternat	Ternat	W	1–2	Siani, Riestra (o.g.)
8 January 2007	Fritz Walter Stadion, Kaiserslautern	1. FC Kaiserslautern	L	1–0	
14 January 2007	Stade Leburton, Tubize	Tubize	L	1–0	
23 January 2007	Borussia-Park, Mönchengladbach	Borussia Mönchengladbach	L	3–1	Goor

==== Trofeo Santiago Bernabéu ====
Date	Venue	Opponents	Result	Score	Anderlecht scorers
23 August 2006	Santiago Bernabéu Stadium, Madrid	Real Madrid	L	2–1	Siani

=== Belgian First Division ===
Date	Venue	Opponents	Result	Score	Anderlecht scorers
30 July 2006	Staaien, Sint-Truiden	Sint-Truiden	W	2–4	Tchité (2), Goor, Hayen (og)
5 August 2006	Constant Vanden Stock Stadium, Anderlecht	Germinal Beerschot	W	1–0	Hassan (pen)
20 August 2006	Het Kuipje, Westerlo	Westerlo	W	3–4	Tchité (3), Frutos (pen.)
27 August 2006	Constant Vanden Stock Stadium, Anderlecht	Club Brugge	W	1–0	Tchité
9 September 2006	Stade Le Canonnier, Mouscron	Mouscron	D	1–1	Goor
16 September 2006	Constant Vanden Stock Stadium, Anderlecht	Lokeren	W	2–0	Frutos, Hassan
22 September 2006	Stade du Pays de Charleroi, Charleroi	Charleroi	D	1–1	Goor
30 September 2006	Constant Vanden Stock Stadium, Anderlecht	Genk	L	1–4	Boussoufa
14 October 2006	Regenboogstadion, Waregem	Zulte Waregem	W	0–4	Frutos (2), Goor, Tchité
28 October 2006	Constant Vanden Stock Stadium, Anderlecht	Lierse	W	2–0	Hassan (2)
5 November 2006	Stade de Sclessin, Liège	Standard Liège	D	0–0	
11 November 2006	Constant Vanden Stock Stadium, Anderlecht	Cercle Brugge	W	2–0	Boussoufa, Mpenza
18 November 2006	Jules Ottenstadion, Ghent	Gent	L	2–1	Tchité
26 November 2006	Constant Vanden Stock Stadium, Anderlecht	Roeselare	W	3–2	Boussoufa, Mpenza, Tchité
1 December 2006	Freethiel Stadion, Beveren	Beveren	D	1–1	Boussoufa
10 December 2006	Edmond Machtens Stadium, Sint-Jans-Molenbeek	Brussels	W	0–1	Tchité
16 December 2006	Constant Vanden Stock Stadium, Anderlecht	Mons	W	4–1	Tchité (2), Frutos, Hassan
20 January 2007	Constant Vanden Stock Stadium, Anderlecht	Sint-Truiden	W	2–0	Hassan, Tchité
28 January 2007	Het Kiel, Antwerp	Germinal Beerschot	W	1–3	Tchité (2), Wasilewski
3 February 2007	Constant Vanden Stock Stadium, Anderlecht	Westerlo	W	1–0	Wasilewski
11 February 2007	Jan Breydel Stadion, Bruges	Club Brugge	D	2–2	Frutos, Juhász
17 February 2007	Constant Vanden Stock Stadium, Anderlecht	Mouscron	W	2–1	Frutos, Teklak (o.g.)
25 February 2007	Daknamstadion, Lokeren	Lokeren	D	1–1	Frutos
3 March 2007	Constant Vanden Stock Stadium, Anderlecht	Charleroi	W	3–2	Hassan (3)
10 March 2007	Fenix Stadion, Genk	Genk	D	1–1	Frutos
17 March 2007	Constant Vanden Stock Stadium, Anderlecht	Zulte Waregem	D	0–0	
31 March 2007	Het Lisp, Lier	Lierse	W	1–4	Boussoufa, Deschacht, Frutos, Van der Zyl (o.g.)
7 April 2007	Constant Vanden Stock Stadium, Anderlecht	Standard Liège	W	1–0	Tchité
14 April 2007	Jan Breydel Stadion, Bruges	Cercle Brugge	W	0–1	Tchité
21 April 2007	Constant Vanden Stock Stadium, Anderlecht	Gent	W	1–0	Frutos
28 April 2007	Schiervelde Stadion, Roeselare	Roeselare	W	0–5	Legear (2), Frutos, Hassan, Mbokani
5 May 2007	Constant Vanden Stock Stadium, Anderlecht	Beveren	W	8–1	Boussoufa (3), Mbokani (3), Frutos, Hassan (pen.)
12 May 2007	Constant Vanden Stock Stadium, Anderlecht	Brussels	W	6–0	Tchité (2) (1 (pen.)), Biglia (pen.), Frutos, Hassan, Colpaert (o.g.)
19 May 2007	Stade Charles Tondreau, Mons	Mons	L	3–1	Tchité (pen.)

==== League table ====
Pos	Team	Pld	W	D	L	GF	GA	GD	Pts	Qualification or relegation
1	Anderlecht (C)	34	23	8	3	75	30	+45	77	Qualification to Champions League third qualifying round
2	Genk	34	22	6	6	71	37	+34	72	Qualification to Champions League second qualifying round
3	Standard Liège	34	19	7	8	62	38	+24	64	Qualification to UEFA Cup second qualifying round
4	Gent	34	18	6	10	56	40	+16	60	Qualification to Intertoto Cup second round
5	Charleroi	34	17	9	8	51	40	+11	60	

(C) Champions

=== Belgian Cup ===
Date	Venue	Opponents	Result	Score	Anderlecht scorers
21 October 2006	Constant Vanden Stock Stadium, Anderlecht	Dessel Sport	W	5–1	Tchité (2), Akin, Frutos (pen.), Hassan
13 January 2007	Constant Vanden Stock Stadium, Anderlecht	Dender EH	W	5–2	Boussoufa (2), Frutos (2), Mpenza
28 February 2007	Fenix Stadion, Genk	Genk	W	0–1	Frutos
14 March 2007	Constant Vanden Stock Stadium, Anderlecht	Genk	W	6–0	Hassan (2), Tchité (2), Frutos (pen.), Von Schlebrügge
17 April 2007	Constant Vanden Stock Stadium, Anderlecht	Standard Liège	L	0–1	
9 May 2007	Stade de Sclessin, Liège	Standard Liège	L	1–2	Mbokani

=== Belgian Super Cup ===
Date	Venue	Opponents	Result	Score	Anderlecht scorers
22 July 2006	Constant Vanden Stock Stadium, Anderlecht	Zulte Waregem	none	(0–0)	
20 December 2006	Constant Vanden Stock Stadium, Anderlecht	Zulte Waregem	W	3–1	Hassan (pen.), Juhász, Siani

=== UEFA Champions League ===
Date	Venue	Opponents	Result	Score	Anderlecht scorers
13 September 2006	Constant Vanden Stock Stadium, Anderlecht	Lille	D	1–1	Pareja
26 September 2006	Olympic Stadium, Athens	AEK Athens	D	1–1	Frutos
17 October 2006	Constant Vanden Stock Stadium, Anderlecht	Milan	L	0–1	
1 November 2006	San Siro, Milan	Milan	L	4–1	Juhász
21 November 2006	Stade Félix Bollaert, Lens	Lille	D	2–2	Mpenza (2)
6 December 2006	Constant Vanden Stock Stadium, Anderlecht	AEK Athens	D	2–2	Frutos, Vanden Borre

== 2006–07 transfers ==
=== Summer 2006 ===
In:

Player	From	Fee
(Argentina) Lucas Biglia	(Argentina) Independiente	€3,000,000
(Morocco) / (Netherlands) Mbark Boussoufa	(Belgium) Gent	€3,500,000
(Egypt) Ahmed Hassan	(Turkey) Beşiktaş	Free
(Argentina) Cristian Leiva	(Argentina) Banfield	€800,000
(Democratic Republic of the Congo) Dieumerci Mbokani	(Democratic Republic of the Congo) TP Mazembe	Unknown
(Argentina) Nicolás Pareja	(Argentina) Argentinos Juniors	€2,000,000
(Belgium) Davy Schollen	(Netherlands) NAC Breda	Loan
(Democratic Republic of the Congo) Mohammed Tchité	(Belgium) Standard Liège	€1,500,000
(Belgium) Jelle Van Damme	(Germany) Werder Bremen	€500,000

Out:

Player	To	Fee
(Belgium) Walter Baseggio	(Italy) Treviso	Unknown
(Ukraine) Oleg Iachtchouk	(Greece) Ergotelis	Unknown
(Czech Republic) Martin Kolář	(France) Ajaccio	Loan
(Belgium) Vincent Kompany	(Germany) Hamburger SV	Unknown
(Serbia) Goran Lovré	(Netherlands) Groningen	Unknown
(Belgium) Gabriel N'Galula	(Belgium) Standard Liège	Unknown
(France) Grégory Pujol	(France) Nantes	Loan return
(Finland) Hannu Tihinen	(Switzerland) Zürich	Unknown
(Burkina Faso) Lamine Traoré	(Turkey) Gençlerbirliği	Unknown
(Sweden) Christian Wilhelmsson	(France) Nantes	Unknown
(Sweden) Pär Zetterberg	none	Retired
(Poland) Michał Żewłakow	(Greece) Olympiacos	Unknown

=== Winter 2006–07 ===
In:

Player	From	Fee
(Brazil) Felipe Lopes	(Brazil) Guarani	Unknown
(Belgium) Walter Baseggio	(Italy) Treviso	Loan
(Nigeria) Oladapo Olufemi	no club	free
(Sweden) Max von Schlebrügge	(Sweden) Hammarby IF	Unknown
(Poland) Marcin Wasilewski	(Poland) Lech Poznań	Unknown

Out:

Player	To	Fee
(Turkey) Serhat Akın	(Germany) 1. FC Köln	Loan
(Tunisia) Sami Allagui	(Belgium) Roeselare	Loan
(Belgium) Hervé Kage	(Netherlands) RKC Waalwijk	Loan
(Belgium) Sven Kums	(Belgium) Lierse	Loan
(Belgium) Regis Lacroix	(Belgium) Roeselare	Loan
(Argentina) Cristian Leiva	(Belgium) Charleroi	Loan
(Cameroon) Sébastien Siani	(Belgium) Zulte Waregem	Loan
(Belgium) Yves Vanderhaeghe	(Belgium) Roeselare	Unknown

== Appearances and goals ==
As of 10 April 2007, includes all Belgian Pro League, UEFA Champions League, Belgian Cup and Supercup matches. Excludes friendlies.

Nat.	Player name	Matches	Goals	Notes
(Czech Republic)	Daniel Zítka	42	0	
(Belgium)	Silvio Proto	0	0	
(Belgium)	Davy Schollen	4	0	
(Belgium)	Jan Van Steenberghe	0	0	
(Brazil)	Felipe Aliste Lopes	0	0	Acquired in January from Guarani
(Belgium)	Olivier Deschacht	45	1	
(Sweden)	Max von Schlebrügge	9	1	Acquired in January from Hammarby
(Belgium)	Jelle Van Damme	30	0	
(Hungary)	Roland Juhász	33	3	
(Argentina)	Nicolás Pareja	28	1	
(Poland)	Marcin Wasilewski	16	2	Acquired in January from Lech Poznan
(Belgium)	Vadis Odjidja-Ofoe	1	0	
(Belgium)	Anthony Vanden Borre	29	1	
(Argentina)	Lucas Biglia	43	1	
(Egypt)	Ahmed Hassan	41	15	
(Morocco)	Mbark Boussoufa	42	10	
(Belgium)	Bart Goor	37	4	
(Nigeria)	Oladapo Olufemi	1	0	
(Belgium)	Walter Baseggio	8	0	Acquired in January from Treviso
(Belgium)	Mark De Man	34	0	
(Belgium)	Roland Lamah	6	0	
(Belgium)	Cheick Tioté	2	0	
(Belgium)	Yves Vanderhaeghe	14	0	Transferred in January to Roeselare
(Democratic Republic of the Congo)	Mohammed Tchité	36	21	
(Belgium)	Mbo Mpenza	20	5	
(Democratic Republic of the Congo)	Dieumerci Mbokani	8	5	
(Argentina)	Nicolás Frutos	33	20	
(Belgium)	Jonathan Legear	28	2	
(Turkey)	Serhat Akın	10	1	Loaned in January to 1. FC Köln
(Tunisia)	Sami Allagui	1	0	Loaned in January to Roeselare

== See also ==
- List of R.S.C. Anderlecht seasons
