= 2007–08 RSC Anderlecht season =

R.S.C. Anderlecht
2007–08 season
- Owner: Constant Vanden Stock (until 19 April 2008); Roger Vanden Stock (from 19 April 2008)
- President: Roger Vanden Stock
- Manager: Franky Vercauteren (until 12 November 2007); Ariël Jacobs (from 12 November 2007)
- Stadium: Constant Vanden Stock Stadium
- Belgian First Division: 2nd
- Belgian Cup: Winners
- Belgian Super Cup: Winners
- UEFA Champions League: Third qualifying round
- UEFA Cup: Round of 16

RSC Anderlecht compete in the Belgian League, Belgian Cup, Belgian Supercup and UEFA Cup. (They were knocked out of the UEFA Champions League in the third qualifying round) in Season 2007-08.

== Players ==
N	Pos.	Nat.	Name	Age	EU	Since	App	Goals	Ends	Transfer fee	Notes
1	GK	(Czech Republic)	Zítka	32	EU	2002			2010		
13	GK	(Belgium)	Proto	24	EU	2005			2010		
22	GK	(Belgium)	Schollen	29	EU	2006			2009		
25	GK	(Belgium)	Bruzzese	18	EU	2007					
27	RB	(Poland)	Wasilewski	27	EU	2007			2011		
32	CB	(Belgium)	Gillis	18	EU					Youth system	
23	CB	(Hungary)	Juhász	24	EU	2003			2011		
26	CB	(Argentina)	Pareja	23	Non-EU	2006			2012		
6	CB	(Belgium)	Van Damme	24	EU	2006			2010		
3	LB	(Belgium)	Deschacht (VC)	26	EU	1996			2011		
5	DM	(Argentina)	Biglia	21	Non-EU	2006			2010		
31	DM	(Belgium)	De Man	24	EU	1997			2009		
30	DM	(Belgium)	Gillet	22	EU	2008 (Winter)			2011		
15	AM	(Belgium)	Chatelle	26	EU	2008 (Winter)			2011		
14	AM	(Belgium)	Goor (captain)	34	EU	2005			2009		
10	AM	(Egypt)	Hassan	32	Non-EU	2006			2008		
36	AM	(Belgium)	Legear	20	EU	2003			2011		
11	MF	(Netherlands) (Morocco)	Boussoufa	23	EU	2006			2010		
35	MF	(Belgium)	Crommen	16	EU					Youth system	
18	MF	(Ukraine)	Iakovenko	20	EU	2008 (Winter)			2008	Loan	On loan from Genk
8	MF	(Czech Republic)	Polák	26	EU	2007			2011		
19	MF	(Ivory Coast)	Saré	17	Non-EU					Youth system	
24	CF	(Turkey)	Akın	26	Non-EU	2007			2008		
29	CF	(Argentina)	Frutos	26	Non-EU	2005			2010		
9	CF	(Belgium)	Mpenza	31	EU	2004			2008		
17	CF	(Democratic Republic of the Congo)	Mukendi	16	Non-EU					Youth system	
40	CF	(Belgium)	Pieroni	27	EU	2008 (Winter)			2008	Loan	On loan from Nantes (via Lens)
7	CF	(Czech Republic)	Vlček	31	EU	2008 (Winter)			2009		

- Last updated: 25 Jan 2008
- Source: rsca.be, players' Wikipedia articles, soccerbase.com, ESPN (for appearances and goals) and footballdatabase.com (for EU passport, contract ending and transfer fee)
- Ordered by position on pitch (from back right to front left).

== Transfers 2007-08 ==
=== Players in ===
No.	Pos.	Nat.	Name	Age	EU	Moving from	Type	Transfer window	Ends	Transfer fee	Source
25	GK	(Belgium)	Bruzzese	18	EU	RFC Liège	Transferred ✓	Summer	2011	Undisclosed	
22	GK	(Belgium)	Schollen	29	EU	NAC Breda (Netherlands)	Transferred ✓	Summer		Undisclosed	
20	LB	(Brazil)	Triguinho	28	Non-EU	São Caetano (Brazil)	6-month loan ✓	Summer	2008	n/a	Uefa.com
8	MF	(Czech Republic)	Polák	26	EU	1. FC Nürnberg (Germany)	Transferred ✓	Summer	2011	€3.5m	Uefa.com
15	FW	(France)	Théréau	24	EU	Steaua București (Romania)	Transferred ✓	Summer	2011	€2.9m	Uefa.com
30	DF	(Belgium)	Gillet	22	EU	Gent	Transferred ✓	Winter	2011	About €2m	Uefa.com
12	RW	(Belgium)	Chatelle	26	EU	Genk	Transferred ✓	Winter	2012	Undisclosed	
18	MF	(Ukraine)	Yakovenko	20	EU	Genk	6-month loan ✓	Winter	2008	n/a	
40	CF	(Belgium)	Pieroni	27	EU	Lens (France)	6-month loan ✓	Winter	2008	n/a	
7	FW	(Czech Republic)	Vlček	31	EU	Slavia Prague (Czech Republic)	Transferred ✓	Winter	2009	Undisclosed	Uefa.com

=== Players out ===
No.	Pos.	Nat.	Name	Age	EU	Moving to	Type	Transfer window	Transfer fee	Source
	GK	(Albania) (Belgium)	Ujkani	19	EU	Palermo (Italy)	Transferred ✓	Summer	Undisclosed	
	GK	(Belgium)	Van Steenberghe	35	EU	Dender	Contract ended ✓	Summer	Free	
	DF	(Brazil)	Felipe	20	Non-EU	Nacional (Portugal)	Transferred ✓	Summer	Undisclosed	
	DF	(Belgium)	Kone	19	EU	Londerzeel	Transferred ✓	Summer	Undisclosed	
	DF	(Nigeria)	Olufemi	19	Non-EU	Boavista (Portugal)	Transferred ✓	Summer	Undisclosed	
	DF	(Belgium)	Weydisch	18	EU	UR Namur	Transferred ✓	Summer	Undisclosed	
	MF	(Iraq)	Al-Abdeen	19	Non-EU	Al Hazm (Saudi Arabia)	Transferred ✓	Summer	Undisclosed	
	MF	(Belgium)	Cavallo	18	EU	Mons	Transferred ✓	Summer	Undisclosed	
	MF	(Belgium) (Turkey)	Gündoğan	17	EU	Gençlerbirliği (Turkey)	Transferred ✓	Summer	Undisclosed	
	MF	(Czech Republic)	Kolář	24	EU	Helsingborg (Sweden)	Transferred ✓	Summer	Undisclosed	
	MF	(Belgium)	Lacroix	20	EU	Tienen	Transferred ✓	Summer	Undisclosed	
	MF	(Belgium) (Democratic Republic of the Congo)	Lifondja	18	EU	RKC Waalwijk (Netherlands)	Transferred ✓	Summer	Undisclosed	
	MF	(Belgium)	Vanden Borre	20	EU	Fiorentina (Italy)	Transferred ✓	Summer	€3.8m	
	MF	(Belgium)	Yakassongo	18	EU	Mouscron	Transferred ✓	Summer	Undisclosed	
	FW	(Germany) (Tunisia)	Allagui	21	EU	Carl Zeiss Jena (Germany)	Transferred ✓	Summer	Undisclosed	
	FW	(Democratic Republic of the Congo)	Mbokani	22	Non-EU	Standard Liège	Transferred ✓	Summer	Undisclosed	
	FW	(Ghana)	Owusu Acheampong	27	Non-EU	Real Tamale (Ghana)	End of trial ✓	Summer	n/a	
	FW	(Democratic Republic of the Congo)	Tchité	23	Non-EU	Racing Santander (Spain)	Transferred ✓	Summer	€7.5m	
28	MF	(Belgium)	Baseggio	29	EU	Mouscron	Transferred ✓	Winter	Undisclosed	
39	DF	(Belgium)	Odjidja-Ofoe	19	EU	Hamburg (Germany)	Transferred ✓	Winter	Undisclosed	Uefa.com
20	DF	(Brazil)	Triguinho	28	Non-EU	São Caetano (Brazil)	End of loan ✓	Winter	n/a	
4	DF	(Sweden)	von Schlebrügge	30	EU	Brøndby (Denmark)	Transferred ✓	Winter	Undisclosed	

Last updated: 19 January 2007
EU = if holds or not a European Union passport; Country: when 2 flags, 1st flag = country that plays for internationally, 2nd flag = country of birth; N = number on jersey; P = Position (for position name, pause mouse pointer on abbreviation); Name = Name on jersey (for more extensive name, pause mouse pointer on name); Age = age on the day of the signing; Moving from = only indicate the club the player was playing before start playing for this club in this season, for the type of the moving see Status column; Moving to = only indicates the club the player is going to play next, for the type of the moving see Status column; Ends = when the player's current contract ends; n/a = Not applicable.

=== Loaned out ===
No.	Pos.	Nat.	Name	Age	EU	Moving to	Type	Transfer window	Transfer fee	Source
	MF	(Belgium) (Burundi)	Habarugira	19	EU	Union Saint-Gilloise	Loaned out ✓	Summer	n/a	
	MF	(Belgium) (Cameroon)	Ngolok	19	EU	Union Saint-Gilloise	Loaned out ✓	Summer	n/a	
	MF	(Cameroon)	Siani	21	Non-EU	Union Saint-Gilloise	Loaned out ✓	Summer	n/a	
	MF	(Ivory Coast)	Tioté	21	Non-EU	Roda JC (Netherlands)	Loaned out ✓	Summer	n/a	
	FW	(Belgium)	Lamah	20	EU	Roda JC (Netherlands)	Loaned out ✓	Summer	n/a	
	MF	(Belgium)	Kums	19	EU	Kortrijk	Loaned out ✓	Winter	n/a	
15	FW	(France)	Théréau	24	EU	Charleroi	Loaned out ✓	Winter	n/a	Uefa.com

Last updated: 19 January 2007
EU = if holds or not a European Union passport; Country: when 2 flags, 1st flag = country that plays for internationally, 2nd flag = country of birth; N = number on jersey; P = Position (for position name, pause mouse pointer on abbreviation); Name = Name on jersey (for more extensive name, pause mouse pointer on name); Age = age on the day of the signing; Moving from = only indicate the club the player was playing before start playing for this club in this season, for the type of the moving see Status column; Moving to = only indicates the club the player is going to play next, for the type of the moving see Status column; Ends = when the player's current contract ends; n/a = Not applicable.

== Competitions ==
Competition	Started round	Current position / round	Final position / round	First match	Last match
Belgian Supercup	—	—	Winner	28 Jul 2007	
Jupiler League	—	—	2	3 Aug 2007	10 May 2008
UEFA Champions League	Third Qualifying Round	—	Third Qualifying Round	15 Aug 2007	29 Aug 2007
UEFA Cup	First Round	—	Round of 16	21 Sep 2007	12 Mar 2008
Belgian Cup	Round 6	—	Winner	24 Nov 2007	18 May 2008

Updated to match played 18 May 2008
Source: Competitions

=== Jupiler League ===
==== Classification ====
Pos	Team	Pld	W	D	L	GF	GA	GD	Pts	Qualification or relegation
1	Standard Liège (C)	34	22	11	1	61	19	+42	77	Qualification to Champions League third qualifying round
2	Anderlecht	34	21	7	6	59	31	+28	70	Qualification to Champions League second qualifying round
3	Club Brugge	34	20	7	7	45	30	+15	67	Qualification to UEFA Cup first round
4	Cercle Brugge	34	17	9	8	62	33	+29	60	
5	Germinal Beerschot	34	16	7	11	46	34	+12	55	Qualification to Intertoto Cup second round

Source: Jupiler League
Rules for classification: 1) points; 2) number of matches won; if teams are still tied a playoff is organised.
(C) Champions

==== Results summary ====
Overall								Home						Away					
Pld	W	D	L	GF	GA	GD	Pts	W	D	L	GF	GA	GD	W	D	L	GF	GA	GD
34	21	7	6	59	31	+28	70	14	2	1	35	10	+25	7	5	5	24	21	+3

Source: Jupiler League

==== Results by round ====
Round	1	2	3	4	5	6	7	8	9	10	11	12	13	14	15	16	17	18	19	20	21	22	23	24	25	26	27	28	29	30	31	32	33	34
Ground	A	H	A	H	A	H	A	H	A	H	A	H	A	H	A	A	H	H	A	H	A	H	A	H	A	H	A	H	A	H	A	H	H	A
Result	W	W	D	W	W	D	D	L	D	W	D	W	L	D	L	L	W	W	D	W	W	W	L	W	W	W	W	W	W	W	L	W	W	W

Source: Competitive Matches
A = Away; H = Home; W = Win; D = Draw; L = Loss

== Matches ==
=== Competitive ===
Game	Date	Tournament	Round	Ground	Opponent	Score^{1}	Report
1	28 Jul 2007	Belgian Supercup	Final	H	Club Brugge	3 – 1	Kick off: 20:45 CET; Attendance: 14,000; Referee: Johan Verbist 4' Boussoufa; 37' Mpenza; 87' Hassan
2	3 Aug 2007	Jupiler League	1	A	Mechelen	1 – 0	Kick off: 20:30 CET; Attendance: 12,000; Referee: Peter Vervecken 91' Wasilewski
3	11 Aug 2007	Jupiler League	2	H	Lokeren	1 – 0	Kick off: 20:00 CET; Attendance: 24,498; Referee: Claude Bourdouxhe 79' Tchité
4	15 Aug 2007	UEFA Champions League	Third Qualifying Round	A (Turkey)	Fenerbahçe (Turkey)	0 – 1	Kick off: 20:00 CET; Referee: Howard Webb 32' Alex
5	18 Aug 2007	Jupiler League	3	A	Dender	2 – 2	Kick off: 18:00 CET; Attendance: 7,100; Referee: Luc Wouters 11' Hassan; 18' Boussoufa
6	25 Aug 2007	Jupiler League	4	H	Brussels	3 – 0	Kick off: 20:00 CET; Attendance: 24,594; Referee: Paul Allaerts 15' Théréau; 17' Wasilewski; 92' Legear
7	29 Aug 2007	UEFA Champions League	Third Qualifying Round	H	Fenerbahçe (Turkey)	0 – 2	Kick off: 20:00 CET; Attendance: 23,000; Referee: Massimo Busacca 4' Kežman; 74' Alex
8	2 Sep 2007	Jupiler League	5	A	Mouscron	2 – 1	Kick off: 18:00 CET; Attendance: 9,000; Referee: Johan Verbist 14' von Schlebrügge; 87' Van Damme
9	15 Sep 2007	Jupiler League	6	H	Zulte Waregem	2 – 2	Kick off: 20:00 CET; Attendance: 24,569; Referee: Benoni Burie 43' Hassan; 58' (pen.) Hassan
10	21 Sep 2007	UEFA Cup	First Round	H	Rapid Wien (Austria)	1 – 1	Kick off: 20:45 CET; Referee: Jonas Eriksson 11' Akın
11	23 Sep 2007	Jupiler League	7	A	Genk	1 – 1	Kick off: 20:30 CET; Attendance: 24,976; Referee: Paul Allaerts 86' Akın
12	29 Sep 2007	Jupiler League	8	H	Charleroi	0 – 1	Kick off: 20:00 CET; Attendance: 25,025; Referee: Jan Wegereef
13	5 Oct 2007	UEFA Cup	First Round	A (Austria)	Rapid Wien (Austria)	1 – 0	Kick off: 20:45 CET; Referee: Nicola Rizzoli 24' Akın
14	7 Oct 2007	Jupiler League	9	A	Roeselare	2 – 2	Kick off: 20:30 CET; Attendance: 8,400; Referee: Benoni Burie 78' Polák; 92' (pen.) Frutos
15	21 Oct 2007	Jupiler League	10	H	Gent	2 – 1	Kick off: 20:30 CET; Attendance: 25,943; Referee: Serge Gumienny 15' Legear; 45' Frutos
16	25 Oct 2007	UEFA Cup	Group stage	H	Hapoel Tel Aviv (Israel)	2 – 0	Kick off: 20:45 CET; Referee: Alexandru Tudor 36' Frutos; 70' Frutos
17	28 Oct 2007	Jupiler League	11	A	Cercle Brugge	0 – 0	Kick off: 18:00 CET; Attendance: 8,400; Referee: Jérôme Efong Nzolo
18	3 Nov 2007	Jupiler League	12	H	Westerlo	3 – 1	Kick off: 20:30 CET; Attendance: 24,997; Referee: Joeri van de Velde 21' Goor; 58' Akın; 88' Akın
19	8 Nov 2007	UEFA Cup	Group stage	A (Denmark)	AaB (Denmark)	1 – 1	Kick off: 19:15 CET; Referee: Laurent Duhamel 59' (o.g.) Jakobsen
20	11 Nov 2007	Jupiler League	13	A	Germinal Beerschot	0 – 2	Kick off: 20:30 CET; Attendance: 12,500; Referee: Luc Wouters
21	24 Nov 2007	Belgian Cup	Sixth	H	Hamme	2 – 1	Kick off: 20:30 CET 31' Legear; 71' Mpenza
22	30 Nov 2007	Jupiler League	14	H	Standard Liège	0 – 0	Kick off: 20:30 CET; Attendance: 25,061; Referee: Paul Allaerts
23	6 Dec 2007	UEFA Cup	Group stage	H	Tottenham Hotspur (England)	1 – 1	Kick off: 20:45 CET; Referee: Damir Skomina 68' Goor
24	9 Dec 2007	Jupiler League	15	A	Sint-Truiden	3 – 4	Kick off: 20:30 CET; Attendance: 11,000; Referee: Jan Wegereef 29' Hassan; 32' Van Damme; 45' (pen.) Hassan
25	16 Dec 2007	Jupiler League	16	A	Club Brugge	0 – 1	Kick off: 13:00 CET; Attendance: 28,199; Referee: Serge Gumienny
26	19 Dec 2007	UEFA Cup	Group stage	A (Spain)	Getafe (Spain)	1 – 2	Kick off: 20:45 CET; Referee: Nikolai Ivanov 68' Théréau
27	22 Dec 2007	Jupiler League	17	H	Mons	3 – 2	Kick off: 20:00 CET; Attendance: 22,395; Referee: Stéphane Breda 17' Odjidja-Ofoe; 36' Hassan; 41' (own) Nibombé
28	12 Jan 2008	Belgian Cup	Seventh	H	Waasland	2 – 0	Kick off: 20:00 CET; Referee: Jean-Baptist Bultynck 60' Akın; 62' Boussoufa
29	19 Jan 2008	Jupiler League	18	H	Mechelen	1 – 0	Kick off: 20:00 CET; Attendance: 25,387; Referee: Luc Wouters 25' (own) Vleminckx
30	27 Jan 2008	Jupiler League	19	A	Lokeren	0 – 0	Kick off: 18:00 CET; Attendance: 8,000; Referee: Peter Vervecken
31	30 Jan 2008	Belgian Cup	Quarter-finals	H	Dender	3 – 0	Kick off: 20:30 CET; Attendance: 8,000; Referee: Jérome Efong Nzolo 1' Vlček; 46' Vlček; 87' Mpenza
32	2 Feb 2008	Jupiler League	20	H	Dender	1 – 0	Kick off: 20:00 CET; Attendance: 25,000; Referee: Tim Pots 24' (pen.) Chatelle
33	9 Feb 2008	Jupiler League	21	A	Brussels	4 – 2	Kick off: 20:00 CET; Attendance: 8,500; Referee: Johan Verbist 3' Van Damme; 26' Gillet; 49' Gillet; 60' Wasilewski
34	13 Feb 2008	UEFA Cup	Round of 32	H	Bordeaux (France)	2 – 1	Kick off: 20:45 CET; Attendance: 17,000; Referee: Paolo Tagliavento 79' Polák; 95' Mpenza
35	16 Feb 2008	Jupiler League	22	H	Mouscron	2 – 1	Kick off: 18:00 CET; Attendance: 24,586; Referee: Tim Pots 14' Polák; 21' Pieroni
36	21 Feb 2008	UEFA Cup	Round of 32	A (France)	Bordeaux (France)	1 – 1	Kick off: 20:45 CET; Attendance: 20,017; Referee: Selçuk Dereli 33' Chatelle
37	24 Feb 2008	Jupiler League	23	A	Zulte Waregem	0 – 1	Kick off: 20:00 CET; Attendance: 8,500; Referee: Frank De Bleeckere
38	27 Feb 2008	Belgian Cup	Quarter-finals	A	Dender	1 – 1	Kick off: 20:30 CET 17' Goor
39	2 Mar 2008	Jupiler League	24	H	Genk	1 – 0	Kick off: 20:00 CET; Attendance: 25,189; Referee: Eric Braamhaar 4' Vlček
40	6 Mar 2008	UEFA Cup	Round of 16	H	Bayern Munich (Germany)	0 – 5	Kick off: 19:00 CET; Referee: Olegário Benquerença
41	9 Mar 2008	Jupiler League	25	A	Charleroi	2 – 0	Kick off: 20:00 CET; Attendance: 13,000; Referee: Serge Gumienny 28' Hassan; 40' Boussoufa
42	12 Mar 2008	UEFA Cup	Round of 16	A (Germany)	Bayern Munich (Germany)	2 – 1	Kick off: 20:45 CET; Referee: Terje Hauge 20' Akın; 35' Iakovenko
43	15 Mar 2008	Jupiler League	26	H	Roeselare	5 – 0	Kick off: 18:00 CET; Attendance: 24,407; Referee: Philippe Flament 14' Hassan; 17' Boussoufa; 36' Biglia; 55' Pieroni; 87' Pieroni
44	19 Mar 2008	Belgian Cup	Semi-finals	H	Germinal Beerschot	1 – 0	Referee: Frank De Bleeckere 87' (o.g.) Dheedene
45	23 Mar 2008	Jupiler League	27	A	Gent	3 – 2	Kick off: 18:00 CET; Attendance: 12,000; Referee: Jérôme Efong Nzolo 24' Vlček; 38' Vlček; 65' (pen.) Frutos
46	30 Mar 2008	Jupiler League	28	H	Cercle Brugge	3 – 1	Kick off: 18:00 CET; Attendance: 24,801; Referee: Luc Wouters 41' Van Damme; 66' Boussoufa; 72' Van Damme
47	6 Apr 2008	Jupiler League	29	A	Westerlo	2 – 0	Kick off: 20:30 CET; Attendance: 8,500; Referee: Johan Verbist 13' Gillet; 35' Frutos
48	13 Apr 2008	Jupiler League	30	H	Germinal Beerschot	2 – 0	Kick off: 20:30 CET; Attendance: 24,759; Referee: Paul Allaerts 60' Vlček; 65' Frutos
49	16 Apr 2008	Belgian Cup	Semi-finals	A	Germinal Beerschot	1 – 1	Kick off: 20:45 CET; Referee: Jerome Efong Nzolo 54' Vlček
50	20 Apr 2008	Jupiler League	31	A	Standard Liège	0 – 2	Kick off: 20:45 CET; Referee: Frank De Bleeckere
51	26 Apr 2008	Jupiler League	32	H	Sint-Truiden	4 – 1	Kick off: 20:00 CET; Attendance: 24,319; Referee: Tim Pots 81' Frutos; 83' Boussoufa; 85' Frutos; 86' Frutos
52	3 May 2008	Jupiler League	33	H	Club Brugge	2 – 0	Kick off: 20:00 CET 17' Vlček; 30' Van Damme
53	10 May 2008	Jupiler League	34	A	Mons	2 – 1	Kick off: 20:00 CET; Attendance: 10,000; Referee: Luc Wouters 34' Vlček; 59' Van Damme
54	18 May 2008	Belgian Cup	Final	N	Gent	3 – 2	Kick off: 16:30 CET; Referee: Serge Gumienny 34' Polák; 70' Boussoufa; 71' Gillet

Last updated: 18 May 2008
Source: sporza.be
^{1}Anderlecht goals come first.
National flags for Ground and Opponent columns are only shown when different from that of Anderlecht.
M = Match; Ground: H = Home, A = Away, N = Neutral, HR = Home replacement, AR = Away replacement.

=== Friendly ===
Match	Date	Competition or tour	Ground	Opponent	Score^{1}	Scorers	GD
1	7 Jul 2007	Friendly	A	Knokke	11 - 0	Mpenza (4), Hassan (2 (1 pen)), Deschacht, Lamah, Mukendi, Van Damme, own goal	11
2	10 Jul 2007	OBI-Cup	N (Switzerland)	Galatasaray (Turkey)	0 - 1		-1
3	12 Jul 2007	OBI-Cup	N (Switzerland)	Borussia Dortmund (Germany)	1 - 2	Baseggio	-1
4	18 Jul 2007	Friendly	A (France)	Nancy (France)	2 - 1	Mpenza, von Schlebrügge	1
5	19 Jul 2007	Friendly	A	Wolvertem	3 - 0	Kums, Mukendi, Odjidja-Ofoe	3
6	21 Jul 2007	Friendly	A (France)	Marseille (France)	2 - 4	Théréau, Wasilewski	-2
7	22 Jul 2007	Friendly	A	OH Leuven	0 - 2		-2
8	25 Jul 2007	Friendly	N	Alemannia Aachen (Germany)	0 - 1		-1
9	31 Jul 2007	Friendly	A (England)	Crystal Palace (England)	1 - 1	Théréau	0
10	6 Jan 2008	Friendly	N	Be Quick (Netherlands)	7 - 0	Théréau (3), Vlček (3), Crommen	7
11	8 Jan 2008	Friendly	A (Spain)	Cartagena (Spain)	0 - 2		-2
12	21 May 2008	Friendly	A	Wolvertem	4 - 1	Boateng, Boussoufa, Mpenza, Pieroni	3

Last updated: 21 May 2008
^{1}Anderlecht goals come first.
Country's flag depict country of foreign team to that of Anderlecht.
Ground: H = Home; A = Away; N = Neutral; HR = Home replacement; AR = Away replacement; GD = Goal difference

== See also ==
- List of R.S.C. Anderlecht seasons
