= Lucas Biglia =

Argentine footballer (born 1986)

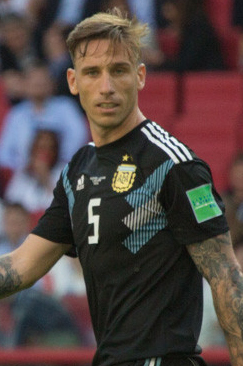
- Biglia with Argentina at the 2018 FIFA World Cup

Personal information
- Full name: Lucas Rodrigo Biglia
- Date of birth: 30 January 1986 (age 40)
- Place of birth: Mercedes, Buenos Aires, Argentina
- Height: 1.78 m (5 ft 10 in)
- Position: Defensive midfielder

Senior career*
Years	Team	Apps	(Gls)
2004–2005	Argentinos Juniors	17	(1)
2005–2006	Independiente	49	(0)
2006–2013	Anderlecht	221	(12)
2013–2017	Lazio	109	(13)
2017–2020	AC Milan	58	(2)
2020–2022	Fatih Karagümrük	68	(4)
2022–2023	İstanbul Başakşehir	25	(0)
Total		547	(32)

International career
2003	Argentina U17	3	(1)
2005	Argentina U20	8	(1)
2010–2018	Argentina	58	(1)
Medal record
Men's football
Representing Argentina
FIFA World Cup
Runner-up	2014 Brazil
Copa América
Runner-up	2015 Chile
Runner-up	2016 United States
FIFA U-20 World Cup
Winner	2005 Netherlands	Team
- * Club domestic league appearances and goals

Lucas Rodrigo Biglia (Spanish pronunciation: [ˈlukas roˈðɾiɣo ˈβiɣlja]; (Note: In isolation, Biglia is pronounced [ˈbiɣlja].) born 30 January 1986) is an Argentine former professional footballer who played as a defensive midfielder.

Formerly of hometown clubs Argentinos Juniors and Independiente, he spent seven seasons with Belgian side Anderlecht, where he made 312 appearances in the Belgian Pro League, winning four league titles. He later spent four seasons with Italian side Lazio, before joining AC Milan in 2017, spending three seasons with the Rossoneri, leaving in 2020 to play in Turkey for Fatih Karagümrük and then İstanbul Başakşehir, before retiring in 2023.

Biglia's first senior international call-up for Argentina was in 2011 and he previously played for the Argentina U20 national team, who won the 2005 FIFA World Youth Championship. He represented his nation at two FIFA World Cups, reaching the final of the 2014 edition of the tournament, and in three Copa América tournaments, winning runners-up medals in the 2015 and 2016 editions of the tournament. He retired from international football after the 2018 FIFA World Cup, with 58 caps and one goal.

== Club career ==
=== Career in Argentina ===
Biglia started his career at Argentinos Juniors and signed his first professional contract in 2004. After scoring against Godoy Cruz on 21 June 2004 in two appearances, he made his Argentinos Juniors debut on 1 July 2004, making his first start, in a 2–1 win over Talleres in play-offs. Eventually, Argentinos Juniors wins 4–2 in the play-offs and is promoted to Argentine First Division. The following season saw Biglia making 15 appearances and scoring 1 goal against Huracán on 28 November 2004. However, a lack of first team appearances led to Biglia leaving the club after only 17 appearances and one goal scored during his time there.

In February 2005, he moved to Independiente for an undisclosed fee following his performance at the South American U-20 Championship. Biglia made his Independiente debut on 26 February 2005, in a 1–0 loss against Lanús. In the first half of his season there, he made 11 appearances before becoming a first team player the following season, where he played in every match.

=== Anderlecht ===
In July 2006, after one-and-a-half seasons at Independiente, Biglia signed with Belgian Pro League club Anderlecht on a four-year contract and upon joining the club, he took up the number five shirt. Soon after, he was joined by his compatriot teammate Nicolás Pareja, Nicolás Frutos and Cristian Leiva.

In the 2006–07 season, Biglia made his debut against K. Sint-Truidense on the opening match of the season, coming on for an injured Mark De Man, in a 4–2 win. Bigila had a difficult start at Anderlecht, having been left out of the Belgian Supercup squad, which Anderlecht won for the second time in a row. Teammate Yves Vanderhaeghe felt sympathy for him and helped him to settle in Belgium and only speak Spanish there. A month later, he made his UEFA Champions League debut, as Anderlecht drew 1–1 against Lille in the group stage. As the season progressed, Biglia established himself in the starting 11 at Anderlecht in a midfield position. With his impressive performance at the club, he was awarded the Young Professional Footballer of the Year in January 2007. He then scored his first goal for the club, which came from a penalty kick, as well as, assisting two times during the game, in a 6–0 victory against FC Brussels to win the league this season. He went on to finish the season, making forty-six appearances and scoring once in all competitions.

In the 2007–08 season, Bigila started the season well when he helped the side win the Belgian Super Cup against Club Brugge. and then setting up a goal for Marcin Wasilewski to score the only goal in the match against KV Mechelen 1–0 in the season opener. After the club was eliminated in the UEFA Champions League, Bigila was considering his future at the club, but remained. Eventually, on 15 December 2007, Biglia signed a contract that kept him at the club until 2012. After sidelined from injury and suspension, he scored on his return from suspension, in a 5–0 win over Roeselare on 16 March 2008. After making 50 appearances and scoring once in the 2007–08 season, the club finished second place after losing to Standard Liège for the league title, but nevertheless won the Belgium Cup.

Ahead of the 2008–09 season, Biglia expressed desire to leave the club after they won the league, but stayed at the club throughout the summer transfer window and then scored his first European goal in a 2–2 draw against BATE Borisov during the Champions League qualification. Despite suffering minor injuries, Biglia continued to be the first team regular and scored two more goals, which were against Westerlo and Roeselare. In the January transfer window, he was linked with European clubs such as Barcelona, Inter Milan, Valencia, Fenerbahce, Galatasaray and Birmingham City. However, he remained at Anderlecht, insisting the club wanted him to stay. The club failed to win the league title in 2008–09. In all competitions, Biglia made 35 appearances and scored three goals.

Ahead of the 2009–10 season, Biglia announced his desire to leave the club in the summer. Despite this, Biglia continued to make a good start at the club when he set up two goals in two matches between 8 August 2009 and 15 August against Cercle Brugge and Westerlo. Biglia then scored his first Anderlecht goal of the season, in the round of 16 of the Belgium Cup, in a 3–0 win over FCV Dender EH. On 17 October 2009, after scoring against Charleroi, Biglia stated his goal was the greatest goal in his Anderlecht career. Biglia suffered a potentially serious injury to his ligament but managed to recover after it was found to be not as serious as first thought. Bigila then scored two more goals in the UEFA Europa League campaign against Athletic Bilbao and Hamburger SV. Despite elimination from the Europa League, the club would win the league title in the 2009–10 season, in which he dedicated the league title to his late father. Biglia went on to make forty-eight appearances and scoring four times in all competitions.

In the 2010–11 season, Biglia started the season well when he set up a goal for Cheikhou Kouyaté to score the winning goal, in a 1–0 win over Gent in the Belgian Super Cup. However, in a 4–1 win over Eupen in the opening match of the season, Biglia suffered a shoulder injury and was sidelined for weeks. Following Deschacht's injury, he was served as club captain for the time being until Deschacht returned, only to be injured himself and sidelined for several weeks. He further suffered a hamstring injury that kept him out for the rest of the year. In the January transfer window, Turkish Galatasaray renewed their interest in him and made a bid of €4.5 million. However, the move never materialized due to a lack of funding. Prior to the interests, Biglia said he would not leave the club in January. Although he was injured again for the fourth time in the 2010–11 season, Biglia made 35 appearances in all competitions.

In 2011–12 season, Biglia signed a new contract that would have kept him at the club until 2015. After the 2011 Copa América, Biglia said he wanted to leave Anderlecht to seek new challenges in a more competitive league. Notwithstanding, Biglia stayed at the club throughout summer and was appointed vice-captain by new manager Ariël Jacobs, with Olivier Deschacht remaining as captain. Biglia then scored his first goal of the season in a 2–2 draw against Monss on 21 August 2011. One month later, he captained his first Anderlecht match on 15 September 2011, a 4–1 win over AEK Athens. He then went on assisting spree when he assisted five times in four league appearances between 25 September and 23 October, including twice against Beerschot and Westerlo. Biglia was later awarded the captaincy after Deschacht was no longer able to continue the role. Deschacht's captaincy was met with disapproval by supporters. Towards the end of October, Biglia suffered a shoulder injury which had to be operated on; he was sidelined for four months. He made his return on 15 January 2012, setting up one of the goals in a 3–0 win over Club Brugge. It was not until on 18 March 2012 when he scored his second goal of the season in a 2–2 draw against Sint-Truiden. Despite missing out with a shoulder injury, Biglia helped the club win the league this season, his first in two years, and went on to make 38 appearances and scored two goals in all competitions. For his performance, Biglia was awarded the club's Player of the Year by club supporters.

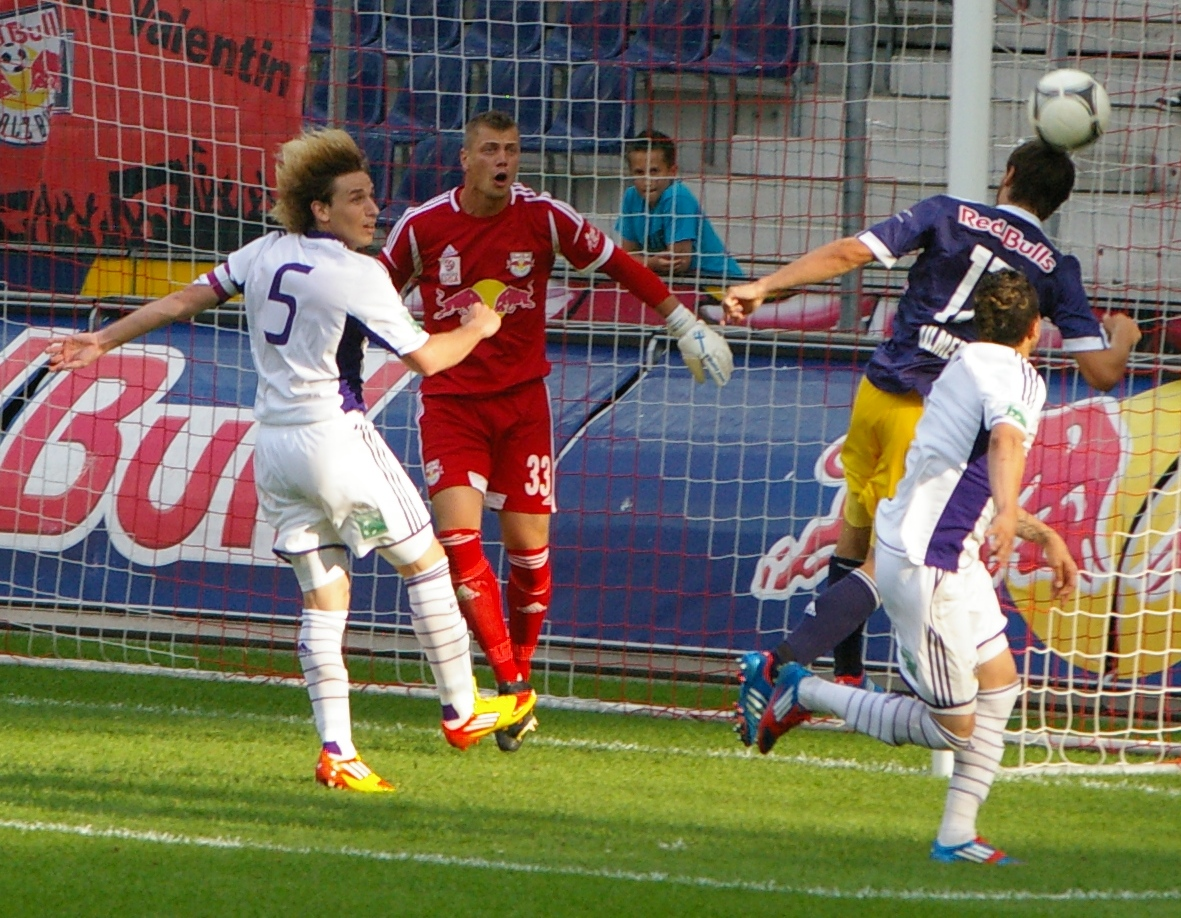
Biglia (wearing number five) in a friendly match against Red Bull Salzburg in 2012.

In the 2012–13 season, Biglia was linked with a move away from Anderlecht, with Arsenal, Norwich City, Real Madrid and Internazionale showing interest. However, he remained at Anderlecht when the summer transfer window closed. In the first half of the season, Biglia continued to impress as a captain and performance and scored three times by the end of 2012 against Waasland-Beveren, Club Brugge and Cercle Brugge. In the January transfer window, Biglia again said he wanted to leave Anderlecht, with Southampton wanting to sign him. Biglia attempted to force a move by failing to show up for training. After the transfer window ended, the club announced Biglia would leave the club in the summer, along with Dieumerci Mbokani. Biglia would claim his absence was due to depression. He also said he never wanted to leave the club. Later in the 2012–13 season, Biglia scored his fourth goal of the season, but received his first red card in his Anderlecht career, as they drew 2–2 against Standard Liège on 3 February 2013. In the last match of the Pro League play-off, Biglia scored the equaliser against Zulte Waregem, which gave Anderlecht the title. Again leading the club to the league title, Biglia made 51 appearances and scored five goals in all competitions.

Shortly after winning the title, general manager Herman Van Holsbeeck confirmed Biglia would leave the club. During the final match, he performed a lap of honour for the fans. During his time at Anderlecht, Biglia's playing style was often compared with that of compatriot Fernando Redondo due to his accurate passing and hard tackling.

=== Lazio ===
On 23 July 2013, Italian side Lazio announced Biglia would be signing a five-year contract for an undisclosed fee. Previously, the club had been Biglia's main transfer target since 2010. According to Lazio's financial report, Biglia cost Lazio about €8.4 million, including €750,000 to his agent.

Biglia made his Lazio debut in the opening match of the season, starting and playing the entirety of a 2–1 win over Udinese. Later in the season, he was sidelined with a calf injury that kept him out twice throughout 2013. Despite this, Biglia established himself in the starting 11 under the management of Vladimir Petković, becoming the club's first-choice defensive midfielder. Biglia then scored his first goal for the club on 22 December in a 4–1 loss against Hellas Verona. In a match against AC Milan on 23 March 2014, he set up a goal for Álvaro González to score the equaliser in an ultimate 1–1 draw. However, after being sidelined with a rib injury, Biglia was sent-off on his return from injury after a second bookable offence in a 2–0 victory against Sampdoria on 6 April. In the last match of the season, Biglia scored the only goal in a 1–0 win over Bologna. In his first season at the club, in all competitions, Biglia made 32 appearances and scored 2 goals.

In the 2014–15 season, Biglia continued to start in the first team before suffering a foot injury during a match against Genoa that kept him out for weeks. After returning to the first team, he scored his first goal of the season on 26 October 2014 in a 2–1 win over Torino. He then suffered another injury by the end of the year, but this time, it was a tear in the abductor muscle. Biglia then scored a penalty in the quarter-final of Coppa Italia in a 1–0 win over Milan. Subsequently, he helped the club reach the final, but he did not play, due to injury and Lazio lost 2–1 to Juventus. It was not until 9 March 2015 when Biglia scored again, in a 4–0 win over Fiorentina. He then scored again on 4 April 2015 in a 3–1 win over Cagliari. Despite suffering from another injury, Biglia finished his second season, making 31 appearances and scoring 4 goals in all competitions.

In the 2015–16 season, Biglia was appointed as the new Lazio captain following Stefano Mauri's departure (eventually returning to the club soon after) and captained his first match in the Supercoppa Italiana match, losing 2–0 against Juventus. Following the match, Bigila regained a good start in the opening game of the season and scoring in a 2–1 win over Bologna. After suffering a calf injury during the latter match, he marked his return from injury by setting up a goal in a 2–0 win over Hellas Verona on 27 September 2015. He then scored in a 3–2 win over Saint-Étienne the UEFA Europa League. After recovering from a hamstring injury, Biglia scored again on 28 October 2015 in a 2–1 loss against Atalanta. Despite being sidelined due to suspension and injury, it was not until on 6 March 2016 when he scored his fifth goal of the season, in a 1–1 draw against Torino. However, Biglia was sent-off on 8 May 2016 after a second bookable offence in a 3–1 win over Carpi.

Ahead of the 2016–17 season, Biglia's future at the club became uncertain after there were no contract offers and would discussed his future following the end of the Copa América Centenario. Eventually, he stayed at the club throughout the summer and continued to remain in the first team, despite suffering from injuries. After returning to the first team, Biglia scored his second goal of the season in a 3–1 win over Genoa on 20 November 2016, then scored one month later in a 3–1 win over Fiorentina. In January 2017, Biglia began negotiations over a new contract with the club. However, his future was in doubt after he rejected a new contract, prompting interests from La Liga clubs, including Atlético Madrid. Amid the transfer speculation, Biglia scored two more goals, against Internazionale and Milan. In a match against Bologna on 5 March 2017, Biglia suffered an injury and was substituted as a result, in a 2–0 win. Although the injury turned out to be less threatening, he suffered a tore in the abductor muscle that ruled him out for one match. Biglia scored on his return from injury in a 2–2 draw against Genoa on 15 April 2017. In a 7–3 win over Sampdoria on 7 May 2017, Biglia set-up two of the goals to help the club qualify for Europe next season. In total, Biglia made 34 appearances and scored 5 goals in all competitions in the 2016–17 season.

=== AC Milan ===
After several rumours in the media over Biglia's uncertain future with the club, Lazio and AC Milan announced an agreement in July 2017 that brought Biglia to Milan. The move was confirmed on 16 July 2017 when Biglia officially signed a contract that would keep him at the club until 2020 in a deal that reportedly cost Milan €17 million. Biglia was released by the club at the end of the 2019–20 season, following the expiration of his contract.

=== Career in Turkey ===
On 14 September 2020, Biglia joined newly promoted Süper Lig side Fatih Karagümrük on a free transfer.

On 10 June 2022, Biglia moved across town to join İstanbul Başakşehir on a free transfer. After one season at the club, he was released on 1 July 2023. On 2 February 2024, Biglia announced his retirement from professional football, ending his 20-year career as a player.

== International career ==
=== Youth career ===
Biglia made his first international appearance for the Argentina U-17 squad and was part of the squad that won South American Under-17 Football Championship, and came third in the FIFA U-17 World Championship, in which he was named Player of the Year. During the U17 World Cup, Biglia scored his first national goal in a semi-final, in a 3–2 loss against Spain. While playing for the Argentina U17, Biglia captained the side on numerous of occasions.

In January 2005, Biglia played for the Argentina U-20 team, participating in the South American U-20 Championship in Colombia and the side went on to win the tournament. Later in the year, Biglia played for FIFA World Youth Championship and once again win the tournament this year.

Three years later, there was a potential chance when Biglia would play for Argentine Olympic team at the 2008 Summer Olympics in Beijing, along with teammate Pareja, after being called up for the pre-selection. Later in July, it was announced that Biglia would not be part of the Olympic team squad after Sergio Batista announced the final squad.

=== Senior career ===
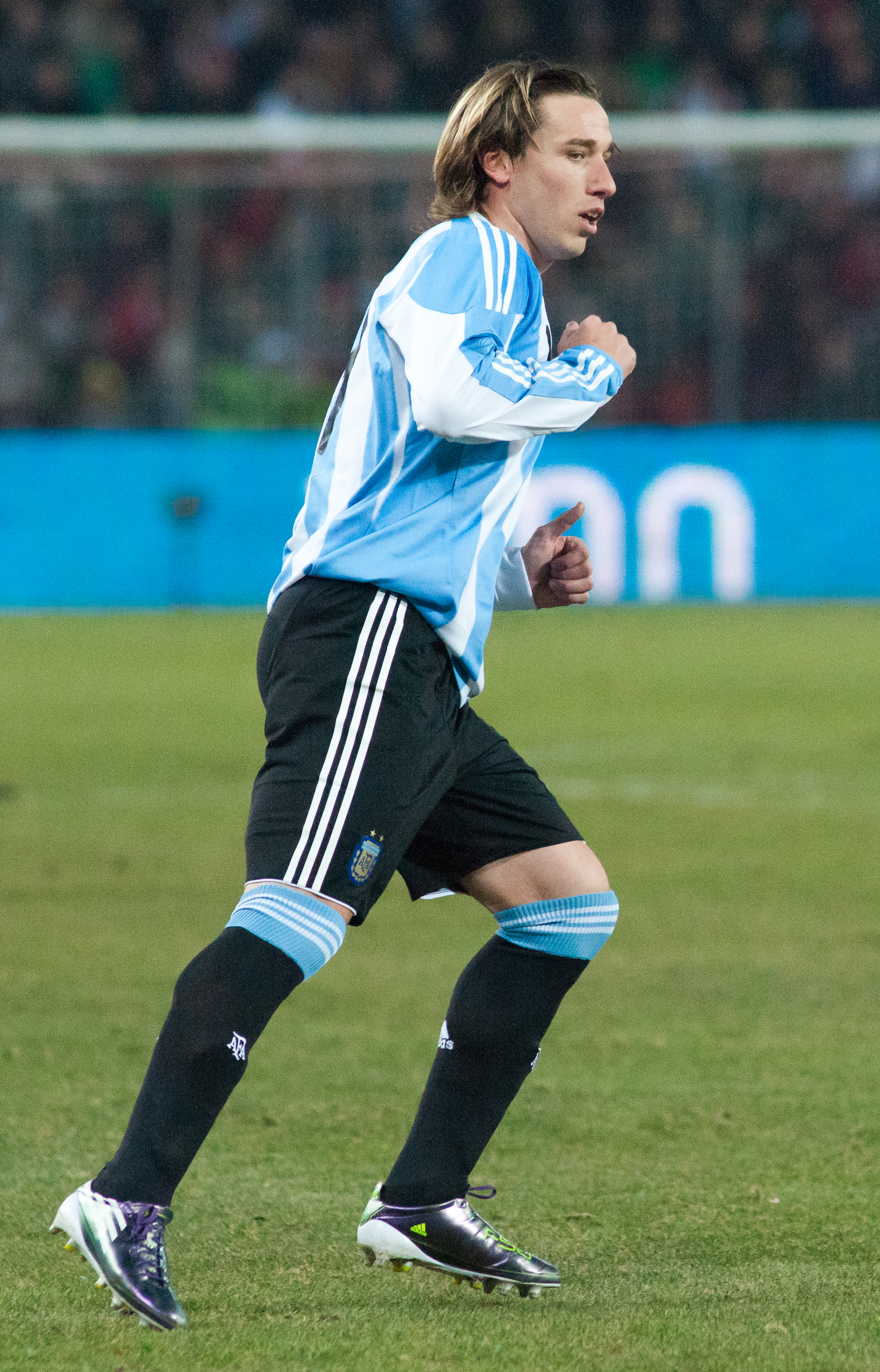
Biglia playing for Argentina in 2011

In October 2009, Biglia hoped his performance at Anderlecht could lead him to get his first call up by then Manager Diego Maradona, but it never happened. It wasn't until in November 2010 when Biglia was called up by Batista for the match against Brazil, but did not play.

In February 2011, Biglia was called up again, a decision that surprised him. Unlike his first call up, his first match for Argentina, in a friendly match against Portugal, which saw them win 2–1. During the same year, Biglia was included by manager Sergio Batista ahead of the Copa América tournament despite an injury, he sustained at Anderlecht, could threaten his chance to play in the tournament. At Copa América tournament, Biglia went on to make two brief substitute appearances as the hosts lost to Uruguay in the quarter-finals on a penalty shootout.

On 2 June 2014, Biglia was called up for the 2014 FIFA World Cup in Brazil. A late substitute in every match up to that point, he was an undisputed starter from the quarter-finals onward, as his nation lost 0–1 to Germany in the final. Biglia also appeared as a starter in five of Argentina's six 2015 Copa América matches, including the final where La Albiceleste lost in a penalty shootout to hosts Chile.

On 17 November 2015, Biglia scored his first and only international goal in a 1–0 2018 FIFA World Cup qualifying win over Colombia in Barranquilla.

Biglia was named to Gerardo Martino's 23-man Argentine side that reached the Copa América Centenario Final. He played in the final of the competition against Chile for the full 120-minutes, which ended in a 0–0 draw after extra-time; in the resulting penalty shoot-out, his penalty was saved by Claudio Bravo, and Chile went on to win 4–2 after netting the next kick. Following the end of the tournament, Biglia was among seven players considering retirement after Lionel Messi announced his retirement, but this never happened.

In May 2018, Biglia was named by manager Jorge Sampaoli in Argentina's final 23-man squad for the 2018 FIFA World Cup in Russia. He made his only appearance in the competition in his team's opening group match against Iceland on 16 June, which ended in a 1–1 draw; he was replaced in the second half by Éver Banega. On 30 June 2018, after Argentina's 4–3 loss to France in the round of 16 of the tournament, Biglia announced his retirement from international duty with 58 caps and one goal.

== Style of play ==
Nicknamed El Principito (Spanish for "Little Prince"), due to his diminutive stature, Biglia was usually deployed as a defensive midfielder, where he normally functioned as a deep-lying playmaker in midfield; during his time with Belgian side Anderlecht, his playing style drew comparisons with compatriot Fernando Redondo. Although Biglia was competent defensively, due to his work-rate and aggression, as well as his ability to read the game and break down opposing attacks, he had also been known for his ability to dictate the tempo of his team's play in midfield or create goalscoring opportunities after winning back the ball, courtesy of his good technique, vision, passing accuracy, and anticipation, as well as his personality, temperament and leadership. He was also known for his ball-striking ability from outside the area, and is an accurate free kick and penalty kick taker. His role had also been likened to that of a metodista ("centre-half," in Italian football jargon), due to his ability to dictate play in midfield as well as assist his team defensively.

== Personal life ==
On 20 December 2011, De Standaard reported that Biglia had married his childhood friend, fellow Argentine Cecilia Ambrosio. The wedding took place at The Place Tokeh Sands in Freetown, Sierra Leone. Together, the couple has a daughter (born in 2009) After three years living in Belgium, Biglia was granted Italian citizenship through his Italian heritage.

During his early career at Anderlecht, Biglia earned a nickname: "the little prince", as well as being as a perfectionist and notorious brooder. In March 2008, Biglia, along with Frutos and Pareja, were involved in a humanitarian aid to help disadvantaged young people in Argentina.

However, in July 2008, Biglia rushed back to Argentina after his father died of a heart attack. He spoke out for the first time with Het Nieuwsblad in October 2008, saying that losing his father affected him. Biglia has an older brother, Christian, also a footballer, who went on a trial at Royal Antwerp in August 2009, but the trial was unsuccessful.

In June 2009, Biglia was reportedly in hospital in his homeland, claiming that he had H1N1 (Swine flu) virus, but test revealed at the end that he did not.

== Career statistics ==
=== Club ===
Appearances and goals by club, season and competition
Club	Season	League			National cup (Note: Includes Belgian Cup, Coppa Italia, Turkish Cup)		Continental		Other		Total	
Club	Season	Division	Apps	Goals	Apps	Goals	Apps	Goals	Apps	Goals	Apps	Goals
Independiente	2005–06	Argentine Primera División	7	0	–		–		–		7	0
Anderlecht	2006–07	Belgian Pro League	33	1	7	0	6 (Note: Appearances in UEFA Champions League)	0	–		46	1
Anderlecht	2007–08	Belgian Pro League	30	1	8	0	11 (Note: Two appearances in UEFA Champions League, nine appearances in UEFA Cup)	0	–		49	1
Anderlecht	2008–09	Belgian Pro League	32	2	1	0	1	1	1 (Note: Appearance in Belgian Super Cup)	0	35	3
Anderlecht	2009–10	Belgian Pro League	34	1	2	1	12 (Note: Three appearances in UEFA Champions, nine appearances and two goals in UEFA Europa League)	2	–		48	4
Anderlecht	2010–11	Belgian Pro League	26	0	1	0	7 (Note: Two appearances in UEFA Champions League, five appearances in UEFA Europa League)	0	1	0	35	0
Anderlecht	2011–12	Belgian Pro League	30	2	1	0	7 (Note: Appearances in UEFA Europa League)	0	–		38	2
Anderlecht	2012–13	Belgian Pro League	36	5	4	0	10	0	1	0	51	5
Anderlecht	Total		221	12	24	1	54	3	3	0	302	16
Lazio	2013–14	Serie A	26	2	1	0	4	0	1 (Note: Appearance in Supercoppa Italiana)	0	32	2
Lazio	2014–15	Serie A	27	3	4	1	0	0	–		31	4
Lazio	2015–16	Serie A	27	4	2	0	6 (Note: One appearance in UEFA Champions League, five appearances in UEFA Europa League)	1	1	0	36	5
Lazio	2016–17	Serie A	29	4	5	1	–		–		34	5
Lazio	Total		109	13	12	2	10	1	2	0	133	16
Milan	2017–18	Serie A	28	1	4	0	5	0	–		37	1
Milan	2018–19	Serie A	16	1	1	0	2	0	–		19	1
Milan	2019–20	Serie A	14	0	0	0	–		–		14	0
Milan	Total		58	2	5	0	7	0	–		70	2
Fatih Karagümrük	2020–21	Süper Lig	35	3	0	0	–		–		35	3
Fatih Karagümrük	2021–22	Süper Lig	33	1	4	1	–		–		37	2
Fatih Karagümrük	Total		68	4	4	1	–		–		72	5
İstanbul Başakşehir	2022–23	Süper Lig	25	0	5	0	12 (Note: Appearances in UEFA Europa Conference League)	0	–		42	0
Career total			515	30	46	3	83	4	5	0	591	37

=== International ===
Appearances and goals by national team and year
National team	Year	Apps	Goals
Argentina	2011	6	0
Argentina	2012	1	0
Argentina	2013	9	0
Argentina	2014	12	0
Argentina	2015	10	1
Argentina	2016	11	0
Argentina	2017	6	0
Argentina	2018	3	0
Total		58	1

Argentina score listed first, score column indicates score after each Biglia goal

List of international goals scored by Lucas Biglia
No.	Date	Venue	Opponent	Score	Result	Competition
1	17 November 2015	Estadio Metropolitano Roberto Meléndez, Barranquilla, Colombia	Colombia	1–0	1–0	2018 FIFA World Cup qualification

== Honours ==
Anderlecht

- Belgian Pro League: 2006–07, 2009–10, 2011–12, 2012–13
- Belgian Cup: 2007–08
- Belgian Super Cup: 2006, 2007, 2010, 2012

Argentina U17

- FIFA U-17 World Championship third place: 2003

Argentina Youth

- FIFA U-20 World Cup: 2005

Argentina

- FIFA World Cup runner-up: 2014
- Copa América runner-up: 2015, 2016

Individual

- Belgian Young Professional Footballer of the Year: 2006–07
