= Mbark Boussoufa =

Moroccan footballer (born 1984)

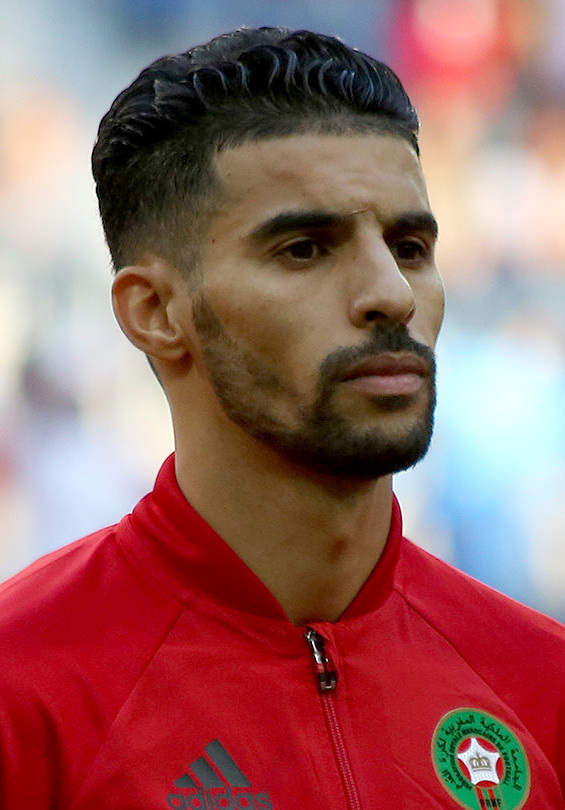
- Boussoufa with Morocco in 2018

Personal information
- Full name: Mbark Boussoufa
- Date of birth: 15 August 1984 (age 42)
- Place of birth: Amsterdam, Netherlands
- Height: 1.67 m (5 ft 6 in)
- Positions: Attacking midfielder; winger

Youth career
- 1994–1995: Middenmeer
- 1995–1996: Fortius
- 1996–2001: Ajax
- 2001–2004: Chelsea

Senior career*
Years	Team	Apps	(Gls)
2004–2006	Gent	59	(14)
2006–2011	Anderlecht	137	(43)
2011–2013	Anzhi Makhachkala	55	(8)
2013–2016	Lokomotiv Moscow	39	(3)
2016	→ Gent (loan)	5	(2)
2016–2018	Al Jazira	37	(7)
2019	Al-Shabab	13	(1)
2019–2020	Al-Sailiya	15	(3)
Total		360	(81)

International career
2006–2019	Morocco	70	(8)
- * Club domestic league appearances and goals

Moubarak "Mbark" Boussoufa (Berber languages:ⵎⴱⴰⵔⴽ ⴱⵓⵙⵙⵓⴼⴰ, Arabic: مُبارك بوصوفة; born 15 August 1984) is a former professional footballer who played as an attacking midfielder or winger. He won the Belgian Golden Shoe in 2006, 2009, and 2010. Born in the Netherlands, he played for the Morocco national team from 2006 to 2019 making 70 appearances and scoring eight goals. He began his career at Ajax before joining Chelsea, and later played for clubs including Gent, Anderlecht, and Lokomotiv Moscow.

== Club career ==
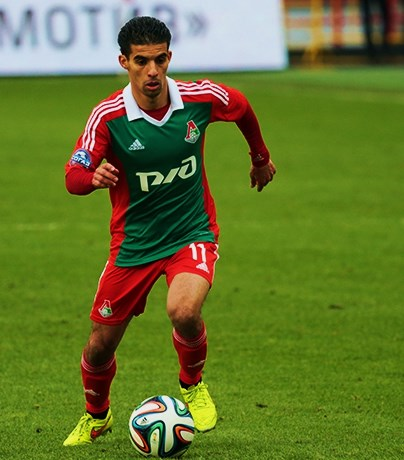
Boussoufa with Lokomotiv Moscow in 2014

Boussoufa started off at the youth academy of Ajax before joining Chelsea. He spent the 2005–06 season with Gent, winning several prizes in 2006: Belgian Golden Shoe, Belgian Footballer of the Year, Belgian Young Footballer of the Year and Belgian Ebony Shoe.

In June 2006, Boussoufa signed a four-year contract with Anderlecht after a €3.5 million transfer. In his first season he was a regular in the title-clinching squad. He became a key player for the team that finished second in both the 2007–2008 and the 2008–09 seasons. Boussoufa was named Belgian Footballer of the Year for a second time after the 2008–09 season in which Anderlecht barely missed out on the title, losing the Championship play-off against Standard de Liège. The next year, he managed 14 goals and 24 assists which made him the most valuable player in Anderlecht's championship-winning squad. He was named Belgian Footballer of the Year for a second consecutive time and the third time overall. After the season, he renewed his contract with a significant raise, making him the best paid footballer in Belgium. He won the Belgian Golden Shoe for the second time in 2010.

In March 2011, Russian side Terek Grozny announced his signing, but his transfer fell through three days later. Instead, Boussoufa signed for another Russian team, Anzhi Makhachkala.

Boussoufa signed a three-year contract with Lokomotiv Moscow in August 2013. With Lokomotiv he won the 2015 Russian Cup, scoring the second goal as they beat Kuban Krasnodar 3–1 after extra time in the final. He returned to Gent on loan from in February 2016.

In July 2016, Boussoufa signed a two-year contract with United Arab Emirates club Al Jazira. He made 16 appearances and scored three times as Al-Jazira went on to win the 2016-17 UAE Arabian Gulf League.

On 3 January 2019, Boussoufa signed a contract until the end season with Saudi club Al-Shabab.

== International career ==
Eligible to play for both Morocco and The Netherlands, Boussoufa chose to represent Morocco and made his international debut against the USA on 23 May 2006.

Boussoufa has represented Morocco at Africa Cup of Nations tournaments; in 2012, 2017 and 2019.

In May 2018, he was named in Morocco's 23-man squad for the 2018 FIFA World Cup in Russia, where he was a starting player in all three of their games.

On 5 July 2019, Boussoufa announced his retirement after Morocco's loss against Benin in the round of 16, 4–1 in penalties (following a 1–1 draw), in the 2019 Africa Cup of Nations.

== Career statistics ==
=== Club ===
Appearances and goals by club, season and competition
Club	Season	League			Cup		Continental		Other		Total	
Club	Season	Division	Apps	Goals	Apps	Goals	Apps	Goals	Apps	Goals	Apps	Goals
Gent	2004–05	Belgian First Division	29	5	3	0	–		–		32	5
Gent	2005–06	Belgian First Division	28	9	4	1	6	1	–		38	11
Gent	2006–07	Belgian First Division	2	0	0	0	2	0	–		4	0
Gent	Total		59	14	7	1	8	1	0	0	74	16
Anderlecht	2006–07	Belgian First Division	33	8	7	2	6	0	–		46	10
Anderlecht	2007–08	Belgian First Division	22	5	7	3	6	0	–		35	8
Anderlecht	2008–09	Belgian First Division	33	11	2	0	2	0	2	0	39	11
Anderlecht	2009–10	Belgian First Division	26	9	4	1	13	3	10	5	53	18
Anderlecht	2010–11	Belgian First Division	23	10	3	0	9	1	–		35	11
Anderlecht	Total		137	43	23	6	36	4	12	5	208	58
Anzhi Makhachkala	2011–12	Russian Premier League	25	4	1	0	0	0	13	3	39	7
Anzhi Makhachkala	2012–13	Russian Premier League	26	4	4	0	14	2	–		44	6
Anzhi Makhachkala	2013–14	Russian Premier League	4	0	0	0	0	0	–		4	0
Anzhi Makhachkala	Total		55	8	5	0	14	2	13	3	87	13
Lokomotiv Moscow	2013–14	Russian Premier League	21	2	0	0	0	0	–		21	2
Lokomotiv Moscow	2014–15	Russian Premier League	17	1	3	3	1	0	–		21	4
Lokomotiv Moscow	2015–16	Russian Premier League	1	0	0	0	0	0	–		1	0
Lokomotiv Moscow	Total		39	3	3	3	1	0	0	0	43	6
Gent	2015–16	Belgian Pro League	5	2	0	0	6	0	0	0	11	2
Al Jazira	2016–17	UAE Pro-League	21	4	3	3	4	1	1 (Note: Appearance in UAE Super Cup)	0	29	8
Al Jazira	2017–18	UAE Pro-League	16	3	3	0	7	0	5 (Note: One appearance in UAE Super Cup, four appearances in FIFA Club World Cup)	0	31	3
Al Jazira	Total		37	7	6	3	11	1	6	0	60	11
Al-Shabab	2018–19	Saudi Pro League	13	1	1	0	0	0	0	0	14	1
Al-Sailiya	2019–20	Qatar Stars League	15	3			1	0	0	0	16	3
Career total			360	81	45	13	77	8	31	8	512	110

=== International ===
Appearances and goals by national team and year
National team	Year	Apps	Goals
Morocco	2006	5	1
Morocco	2007	2	0
Morocco	2008	3	0
Morocco	2009	5	0
Morocco	2010	3	0
Morocco	2011	7	3
Morocco	2012	5	1
Morocco	2013	0	0
Morocco	2014	5	1
Morocco	2015	1	0
Morocco	2016	6	0
Morocco	2017	13	1
Morocco	2018	8	0
Morocco	2019	7	1
Total		70	8

Scores and results list Morocco's goal tally first, score column indicates score after each Boussoufa goal.

List of international goals scored by Mbark Boussoufa
No.	Date	Venue	Opponent	Score	Result	Competition
1	2 September 2006	Stade Moulay Abdellah, Rabat, Morocco	Malawi	2–0	2–0	2008 Africa Cup of Nations qualification
2	9 February 2011	Marrakesh Stadium, Marrakesh, Morocco	Niger	1–0	3–0	Friendly
3	9 February 2011	Marrakesh Stadium, Marrakesh, Morocco	Niger	2–0	3–0	Friendly
4	9 October 2011	Marrakesh Stadium, Marrakesh, Morocco	Tanzania	3–1	3–1	2012 Africa Cup of Nations qualification
5	29 February 2012	Marrakesh Stadium, Marrakesh, Morocco	Burkina Faso	1–0	2–0	Friendly
6	13 October 2014	Marrakesh Stadium, Marrakesh, Morocco	Kenya	2–0	3–0	Friendly
7	31 May 2017	Stade Adrar, Agadir, Morocco	Netherlands	1–2	1–2	Friendly
8	1 July 2019	Al Salam Stadium, Cairo, Egypt	South Africa	1–0	1–0	2019 Africa Cup of Nations

== Honours ==
Anderlecht

- Belgian Pro League: 2006–07, 2009–10
- Belgian Cup: 2007–08
- Belgian Super Cup: 2007, 2010

Anzhi Makhachkala

- Russian Cup runners-up: 2012–13

Lokomotiv Moscow

- Russian Cup: 2014–15

Al Jazira

- UAE Pro League: 2016–17

Individual

- Best Gent player of the Season: 2005–06
- Belgian Young Professional Footballer of the Year: 2005–06
- Belgian Professional Footballer of the Year: 2005–06, 2008–09, 2009–10
- Man of the Season (Belgian First Division): 2005–06
- Belgian Ebony Shoe: 2005–06, 2008–09, 2009–10
- Belgian Golden Shoe: 2006, 2009, 2010
- Belgian Lion Award: 2010, 2011
