= Jelle Van Damme =

Belgian footballer (born 1983)

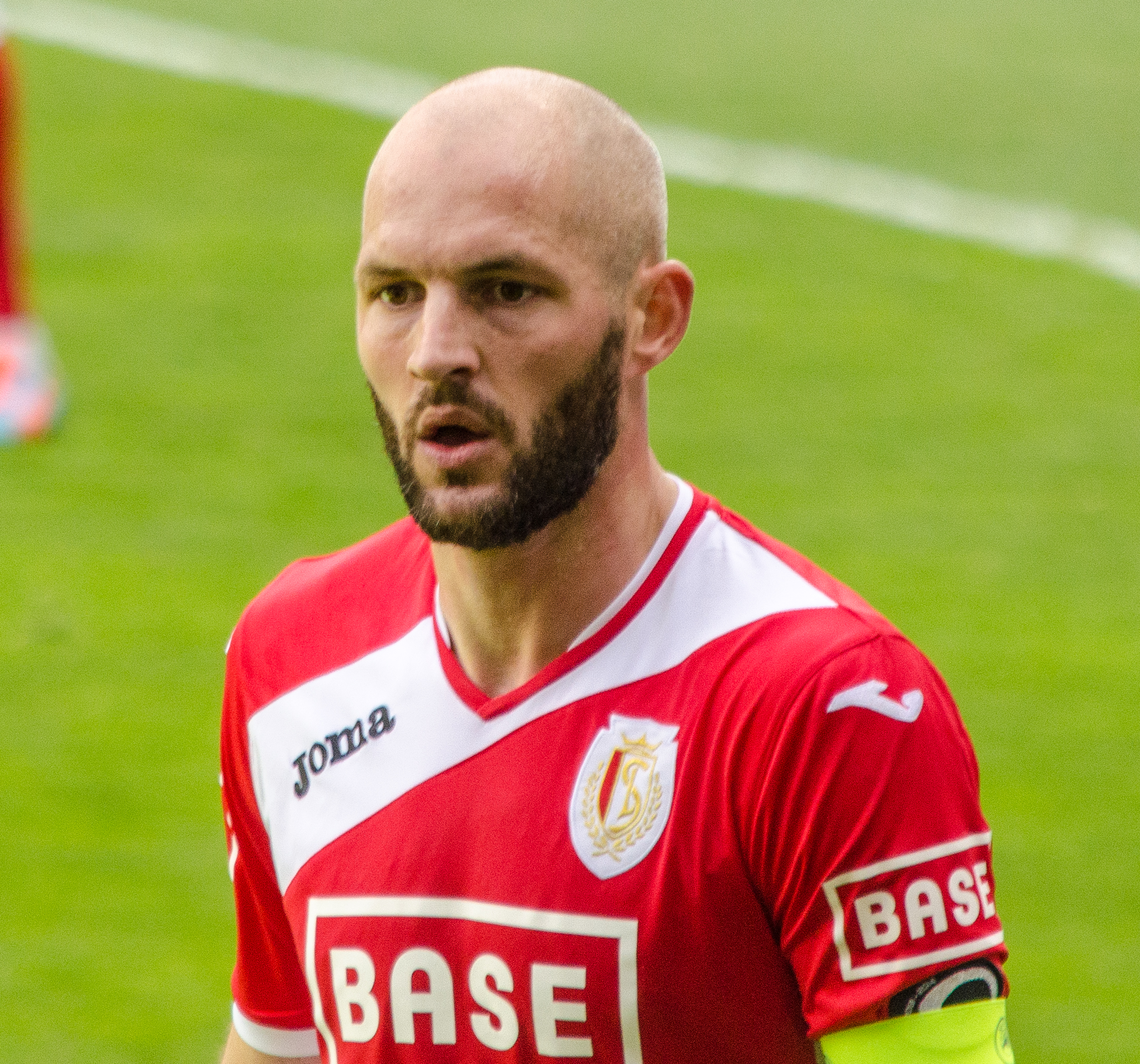
- Van Damme playing for Standard Liège in 2014

Personal information
- Full name: Jelle François Maria Van Damme
- Date of birth: 10 October 1983 (age 43)
- Place of birth: Lokeren, Belgium
- Height: 1.94 m (6 ft 4 in)
- Positions: Defender; left midfielder

Youth career
- Beveren
- Lokeren

Senior career*
Years	Team	Apps	(Gls)
1998	Lokeren	1	(0)
2001–2002	Germinal Beerschot	7	(0)
2002–2004	Ajax	18	(0)
2004–2006	Southampton	6	(0)
2005–2006	→ Werder Bremen (loan)	8	(1)
2006–2010	Anderlecht	100	(12)
2010–2011	Wolverhampton Wanderers	6	(1)
2011–2016	Standard Liège	120	(17)
2016–2017	LA Galaxy	46	(1)
2017–2019	Royal Antwerp	44	(1)
2019–2020	Lokeren	23	(1)
Total		379	(34)

International career
2001–2002	Belgium U19	18	(0)
2002–2003	Belgium U21	4	(0)
2003–2014	Belgium	31	(0)
- * Club domestic league appearances and goals

Jelle François Maria Van Damme (Dutch pronunciation: [ˈjɛlə vɑn ˈdɑmə]; born 10 October 1983) is a Belgian retired professional footballer who played as a centre-back, left-back or left midfielder. He played for clubs in Belgium, England, Germany, the Netherlands and the United States. He also earned over 30 caps for the Belgium national team.

== Club career ==
=== Early career ===
Van Damme started his career at Beveren, before he made a short move to neighbour club Lokeren where he played in the youth teams. He then signed for Germinal Beerschot in 2001, making his senior debut in the Jupiler League. Beerschot were linked with Ajax and the Amsterdam club soon offered him a trial stay beginning in February 2002.

In summer 2002, Van Damme moved permanently to Ajax where he showed promise in the Dutch Cup. In the 2002–03 season, he played in the Champions League and started as a regular player in the squad before breaking his toe in November 2002. The next season, he helped Ajax again qualify for the Champions League group stage but he had few chances to play in the first team's title winning campaign, with the club preferring the Brazilian Maxwell at full back. This limited chance of game time led him to sign for Southampton of the Premier League in June 2004, for £2.5 million.

He made little impact during his spell with Southampton, playing just six times during the 2004–05 season, as the club were relegated to the Championship. He spent the 2005–06 season on loan at German Bundesliga club Werder Bremen but again struggled to hold down regular football, making just eight appearances (three starts), as the club finished runners-up. In search of more playing opportunities, Van Damme returned to his homeland to sign for Anderlecht in June 2006 for €500,000.

=== Anderlecht ===
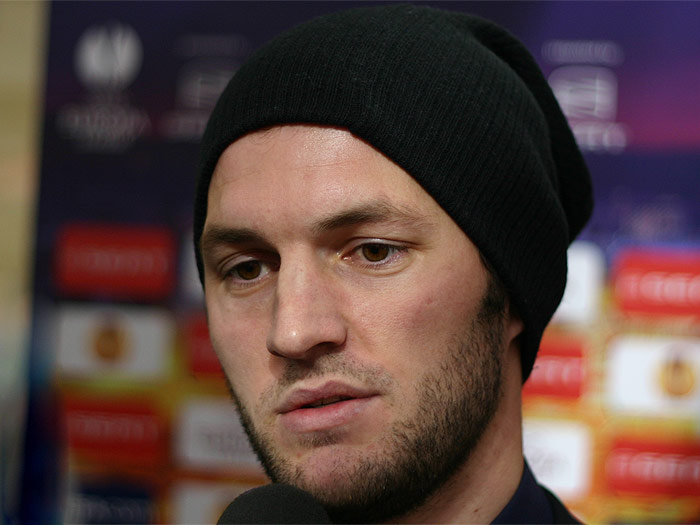
Van Damme in 2009.

His four-year spell at Anderlecht was much more successful as he won two Jupiler League championships (twice runners-up) and the 2008 Belgian Cup, and appeared in the Champions League group stages several times. Van Damme scored in the 2–1 win at rivals Club Brugge that won the second of these league titles in 2010.

His time in Brussels was the source of an unsavoury incident however, when Standard Liège defender Oguchi Onyewu accused him of racial abuse alleging that Van Damme called Onyewu a "dirty monkey" during the 2008–09 Championship playoff between the clubs. Onyewu subsequently sued Van Damme, although the case was withdrawn in February 2011 after a meeting between the two players when Van Damme apologised for any offence he may have given.

=== Wolverhampton Wanderers ===
Van Damme returned to the Premier League in June 2010 by joining Wolverhampton Wanderers. He signed a three-year deal, with the option of a fourth year, for a fee reported to be around £2.5 million. Sell-on clauses relating to his 2006 move to Anderlecht mean that Southampton should receive between 10 and 15 per cent of the fee received from Wolves, estimated at £300,000.

He scored his first, and only, goal for Wolves against Fulham on 11 September 2010. He struggled to settle at the club though, and on 29 November 2010, he signed a pre-contract agreement to return to his Belgian homeland in a three-and-a-half-year deal with Standard Liège, after just six appearances for the Midlands club.

=== Standard Liège ===
Van Damme's return to Belgium was officially ratified when the January 2011 transfer window opened. He made his Standard debut (playing as captain) in a 2–0 loss at former club Anderlecht on 23 January.

=== LA Galaxy ===
On 26 January 2016, it was announced that Van Damme had joined LA Galaxy. He made his debut on 24 February 2016 in a CONCACAF Champions League quarterfinal leg against Santos Laguna.

=== Royal Antwerp ===
In August 2017, Van Damme returned yet again to Belgium as he was signed by Royal Antwerp for $235,000. Van Damme said the main reason for leaving the LA Galaxy was that he wanted to be closer to his children.

=== Lokeren ===
On 3 July 2019, he signed a one-year contract with Lokeren.

=== Retirement ===
Van Damme retired from professional football in February 2021.

== International career ==
Van Damme made his debut for the Belgium national team on 29 March 2003 in a 4–0 friendly loss to Croatia. He appeared for the national team during their unsuccessful qualifying campaigns for the 2006 and 2010 World Cups and UEFA Euro 2008.

== Personal life ==
Van Damme was married to former tennis player Elke Clijsters, sister of Kim Clijsters, whom he wed in May 2008 in Bree, Belgium. The marriage ended in 2016. They have two children.

== Career statistics ==
=== Club ===
Appearances and goals by club, season and competition
Club	Season	League			National Cup		League Cup		Continental		Other		Total	
Club	Season	Division	Apps	Goals	Apps	Goals	Apps	Goals	Apps	Goals	Apps	Goals	Apps	Goals
Lokeren	1998–99	Belgian First Division	1	0	0	0	—		—		—		1	0
Germinal Beerschot	2001–02	Belgian First Division	7	0	0	0	—		—		—		7	0
Ajax	2001–02	Eredivisie	1	0			—		0	0	—		1	0
Ajax	2002–03	Eredivisie	11	0			—		7	0	—		18	0
Ajax	2003–04	Eredivisie	6	0			—		5	0	—		11	0
Ajax	Total		18	0	0	0	0	0	12	0	0	0	30	0
Southampton	2004–05	Premier League	6	0	0	0	3	0	—		—		9	0
Werder Bremen (loan)	2005–06	Bundesliga	8	1	1	0	—		1	0	—		10	1
Anderlecht	2006–07	Belgian First Division	25	0	0	0	—		3	0	—		28	0
Anderlecht	2007–08	Belgian First Division	29	7	1	0	—		10	0	—		40	7
Anderlecht	2008–09	Belgian First Division	22	3	0	0	—		—		2 (Note: Belgian First Division championship play-offs)	0	24	3
Anderlecht	2009–10	Belgian Pro League	24	2	1	0	—		10	1	10 (Note: Appearances in Belgian Pro League play-offs)	5	45	8
Anderlecht	Total		100	12	2	0	0	0	23	1	12	5	137	18
Wolverhampton Wanderers	2010–11	Premier League	6	1	0	0	0	0	—		—		6	1
Standard Liège	2010–11	Belgian Pro League	8	2	4	1	—		—		9	0	21	3
Standard Liège	2011–12	Belgian Pro League	20	5	2	2	—		9	0	11 (Note: Ten appearances in league-playoffs, one appearance(s) in the Belgian Super Cup)	0	42	7
Standard Liège	2012–13	Belgian Pro League	28	3	2	1	—		—		7	0	37	4
Standard Liège	2013–14	Belgian Pro League	28	3	1	0	—		7	0	10	0	46	3
Standard Liège	2014–15	Belgian Pro League	19	2	1	0	—		9	0	7	0	36	2
Standard Liège	2015–16	Belgian Pro League	17	2	2	0	—		4	1	—		23	3
Standard Liège	Total		120	17	12	4	0	0	29	1	44	0	205	22
LA Galaxy	2016	Major League Soccer	28	0	1	0	—		2	0	3 (Note: Appearances in MLS play-offs)	0	34	0
LA Galaxy	2017	Major League Soccer	18	1	3	1	—		—		—		21	2
LA Galaxy	Total		46	1	4	1	0	0	2	0	3	0	55	2
Royal Antwerp	2017–18	Belgian First Division A	19	0	1	0	—		—		4 (Note: Appearances in Belgian First Division A play-offs)	0	24	0
Royal Antwerp	2018–19	Belgian First Division A	25	1	0	0	—		—		9	0	34	1
Royal Antwerp	Total		44	1	1	0	0	0	0	0	13	0	58	1
Lokeren	2019–20	Belgian First Division B	23	1	1	0	—		—		—		24	1
Career total			379	34	21	5	3	0	67	2	72	5	542	46

== Honours ==
Ajax

- Eredivisie: 2003–04

Werder Bremen

- Bundesliga runner-up: 2005–06

Anderlecht

- Belgian First Division: 2006–07, 2009–10
- Belgian Cup: 2007–08
- Belgian Super Cup: 2006, 2007

Standard Liège

- Belgian Cup: 2010–11

=== Individual ===
- MLS All Star: 2016
- MLS Best XI: 2016
