= Serhat Akın =

Turkish footballer (born 1981)

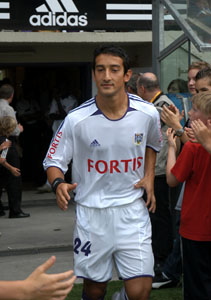
- Akın in action for Anderlecht

Personal information
- Full name: Niyazi Serhat Akın
- Date of birth: 5 June 1981 (age 45)
- Place of birth: Bretten, West Germany
- Height: 1.78 m (5 ft 10 in)
- Positions: Winger; striker

Youth career
- 1986–1991: FC Viktoria Jöhlingen
- 1991–2000: Karlsruher SC

Senior career*
Years	Team	Apps	(Gls)
2000–2005	Fenerbahçe	125	(41)
2005–2008	Anderlecht	49	(13)
2006–2007	→ 1. FC Köln (loan)	7	(1)
2008–2009	Kocaelispor	11	(0)
2009	Konyaspor	11	(1)
2009–2011	Karlsruher SC	18	(0)
2011–2012	Turgutluspor	25	(15)
2012	Altay	5	(0)
2013	TSV Grunbach	0	(0)
2013–2014	Berliner AK 07	7	(2)
Total		258	(73)

International career
2000–2002	Turkey U21	22	(12)
2002–2005	Turkey	16	(3)
- * Club domestic league appearances and goals

Niyazi Serhat Akın (born 5 June 1981) is a Turkish former professional footballer who played as a striker.

== Club career ==
=== Fenerbahçe ===
Akın played for Fenerbahçe SK between 2000–2005 and played 140 matches (147 for the Süper Lig), after which he went to Anderlecht on a free transfer in the summer of 2005.

=== Anderlecht and 1. FC Köln (2005–2008) ===
In 2005, Akin joined the Belgian R.S.C. Anderlecht. He wore the number 24 jersey for the Mauves, with the number 9 jersey worn by the more senior Mbo Mpenza. In his first year at Anderlecht, he helped them become champions of the Belgian First Division, by scoring the first goal in their 2–0 victory over direct rivals Standard Liège three matchdays from the end of the season.

In the winter transfer window or 2006–07, he was loaned out to Second Bundesliga side 1. FC Köln due to the lack of opportunities and having lower seniority than Nicolas Frutos, Mohammed Tchite and Mbo Mpenza. He received further setback in the 2006–07 season when he had stomach injuries which kept him sidelined for half a year. However, with the transfer of Tchite, and the injury to Frutos in the early part of the 2007–08 Jupiler League, Akin returned to the starting eleven of Anderlecht. He repaid the faith of his manager Franky Vercauteren, scoring two vital goals in the UEFA Cup tie against Rapid Vienna and sending the Belgian team into the group stage of the second-tier European competition. Akin said it was a "small miracle" to be part of the Anderlecht team again. This brief period of goals was interrupted by another injury to the striker, causing him to miss out an opportunity to cement his spot in the Anderlecht team.

=== Kocaelispor ===
Akın signed a one-year contract for the 2008–09 season with the recently promoted Turkish Super League side Kocaelispor. However, after six months with Kocaelispor, he left the team as Kocaelispor could not pay his wages.

=== Karlsruhe ===
In November 2009, he signed a contract with Karlsruher Sport Club until 30 June 2010.

=== Turgutluspor ===
Akın returned to Turkey after accepting an offer from his old teammate Yusuf Simsek who was appointed as the player-manager for the TFF Second League team. According to his manager, Akın has grown into a more humble player as his fame deteriorated.

== International career ==
He played 16 times for Turkey and scored three goals. He also played 22 times for Turkey Under 21 and scored 12 goals.

== Honours ==
Fenerbahçe

- Süper Lig: 2000–01, 2003–04, 2004–05

Anderlecht

- Belgian Pro League: 2005–06

== Shooting incident ==
On 27 September 2024, Akın was attacked with a gun after in his right foot while leaving a program. He took to his Twitter account to announce the attack.
