= Marcin Wasilewski =

Polish footballer

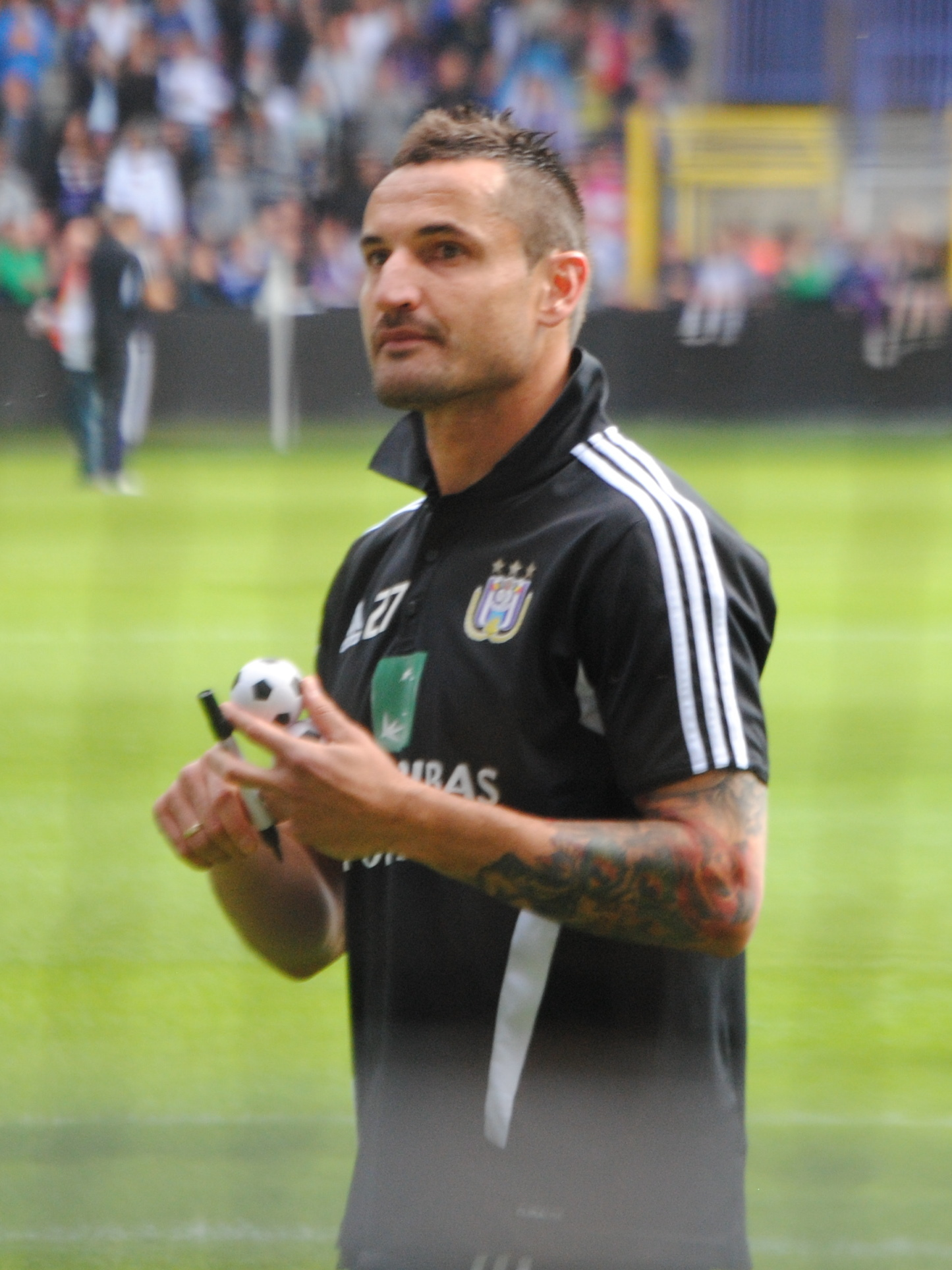
- Wasilewski with Anderlecht in 2011

Personal information
- Full name: Marcin Ryszard Wasilewski
- Date of birth: 9 June 1980 (age 46)
- Place of birth: Kraków, Poland
- Height: 1.86 m (6 ft 1 in)
- Position: Centre back

Senior career*
Years	Team	Apps	(Gls)
1998–2000	Hutnik Kraków	54	(0)
2000–2002	Śląsk Wrocław	51	(5)
2002–2005	Wisła Płock	60	(3)
2005–2006	Amica Wronki	24	(4)
2006–2007	Lech Poznań	14	(5)
2007–2013	Anderlecht	145	(20)
2013–2017	Leicester City	61	(1)
2017–2020	Wisła Kraków	60	(1)
Total		469	(39)

International career
2002–2013	Poland	60	(3)
- * Club domestic league appearances and goals

Marcin Ryszard Wasilewski (born 9 June 1980) is a Polish football pundit and former player who played as a centre-back. He is best known for winning the Premier League with Leicester City and getting injured after a challenge by Axel Witsel during a match in 2009.

== Career ==
=== Early career ===
Wasilewski was born in Kraków, Poland, and started his senior career at local club Hutnik Kraków before playing for Śląsk Wrocław and Wisła Płock. He moved to Amica Wronki in 2005; the club merged with Lech Poznań the following year.

=== Anderlecht ===
He was acquired by Belgian side Anderlecht in January 2007. During the 2008–09 season he was the club's third-most prolific goalscorer, tying with Guillaume Gillet at eight goals.

==== Leg injury ====
On 30 August 2009, Wasilewski suffered an open leg fracture in the 26th minute of the 1–1 Jupiler League draw between Anderlecht and Standard Liège when Liège's Axel Witsel made a challenge. Witsel was red-carded for the offence. Wasilewski underwent corrective surgery for open fractures to both the tibia and fibula. Witsel was suspended for eight games by the Belgian FA over the incident, after an appeal.

==== Return ====
After a long rehabilitation, Wasilewski made his return on 8 May 2010. He celebrated his return to Anderlecht's first eleven with the opening goal of his side's 2–1 win at S.V. Zulte Waregem.

His drive to return was rewarded with a new contract until the summer of 2013, with the club describing him as "a club monument, who had to deliver an inhuman battle".

Wasilewski and Witsel, then of Zenit St. Petersburg, met again on the field on 24 October 2012 in a UEFA Champions League group match. Wasilewski announced in advance that he would refuse to shake hands with Witsel before the game, with Anderlecht management accepting his decision. However, he ultimately changed his mind and accepted Witsel's hand, saying that he did not want to "turn the atmosphere of the match into a personal duel".

=== Leicester City ===
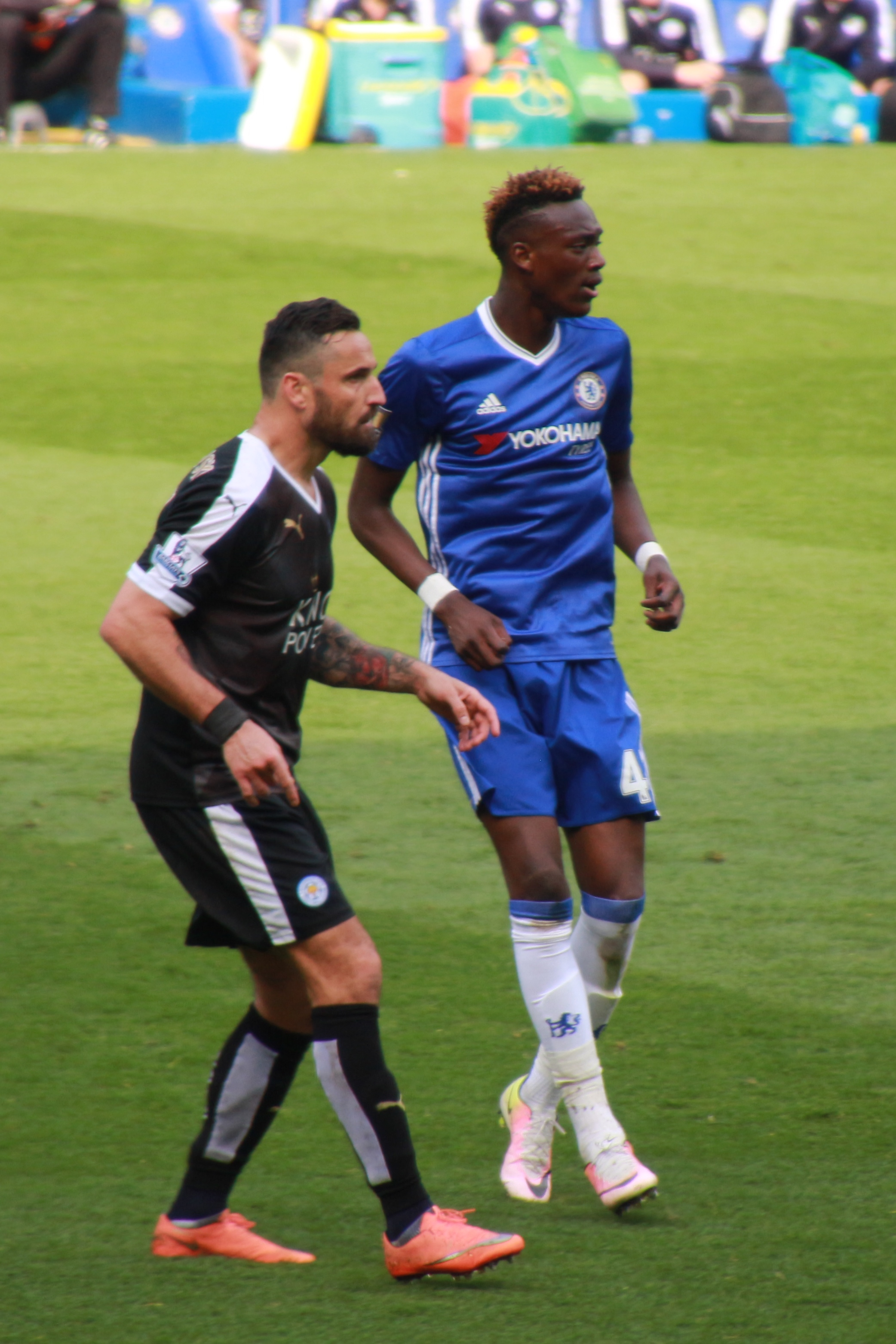
Wasilewski playing for Leicester City in a league match against Chelsea at Stamford Bridge on 15 May 2016

On 14 September 2013, Wasilewski was reported to be undergoing a trial with Leicester City in the English Championship, in the hope of landing a contract. On 17 September he was confirmed as having signed for the Foxes on a one-year contract. He made his debut in a League Cup third-round match against Derby County on 24 September, playing the entire match as Leicester won 2–1. On 30 November 2013, a coachload of Anderlecht fans travelled to Leicester's King Power Stadium to support Wasilewski at his new club. There were emotional scenes after he played a key role in City's 3–0 win over Millwall. Wasilewski established himself as a first-team regular as Leicester finished the season as Championship champions and secured their return to the Premier League. On 22 May 2014, he extended his contract by a further year.

Wasilewski made his Premier League debut on 1 November 2014, in the 0–1 defeat against West Bromwich Albion, during which he appeared to elbow opposing striker Saido Berahino; however, the FA cleared the defender. On 31 January 2015, Wasilewski scored his first goal in English football, heading in a late consolation goal in Leicester's 3–1 defeat by Manchester United which was also the second goal ever scored in the Premier League by a Polish footballer; Robert Warzycha had scored in the competition's opening weekend, 22 1/2 years earlier. On 4 June, Wasilewski announced via his Instagram account that he had signed a new one-year contract with Leicester City.

He made his first league appearance of the 2015–16 Premier League season on 19 December 2015 when he started in a 3–2 win over Everton. Wasilewski played only two league games before Leicester's Premier League trophy presentation on 7 May 2016, making him ineligible for a winner's medal (a minimum of five league games is required). Nonetheless, owing to teammate Robert Huth's suspension, Wasilewski played the final two matches of the Premier League season, taking his appearances up to four. On 14 June 2016, Wasilewski signed a one-year extension to his contract.

Wasilewski's first senior appearance in 2016–17 ended in his dismissal in the 89th minute for elbowing Diego Costa in a 2–4 EFL Cup third-round defeat to Chelsea on 20 September 2016.

== International ==
Wasilewski made his debut in a friendly match against Denmark in Copenhagen on 20 November 2002. Wasilewski was also part of the Poland squads for Euro 2008 and Euro 2012.

== Career statistics ==
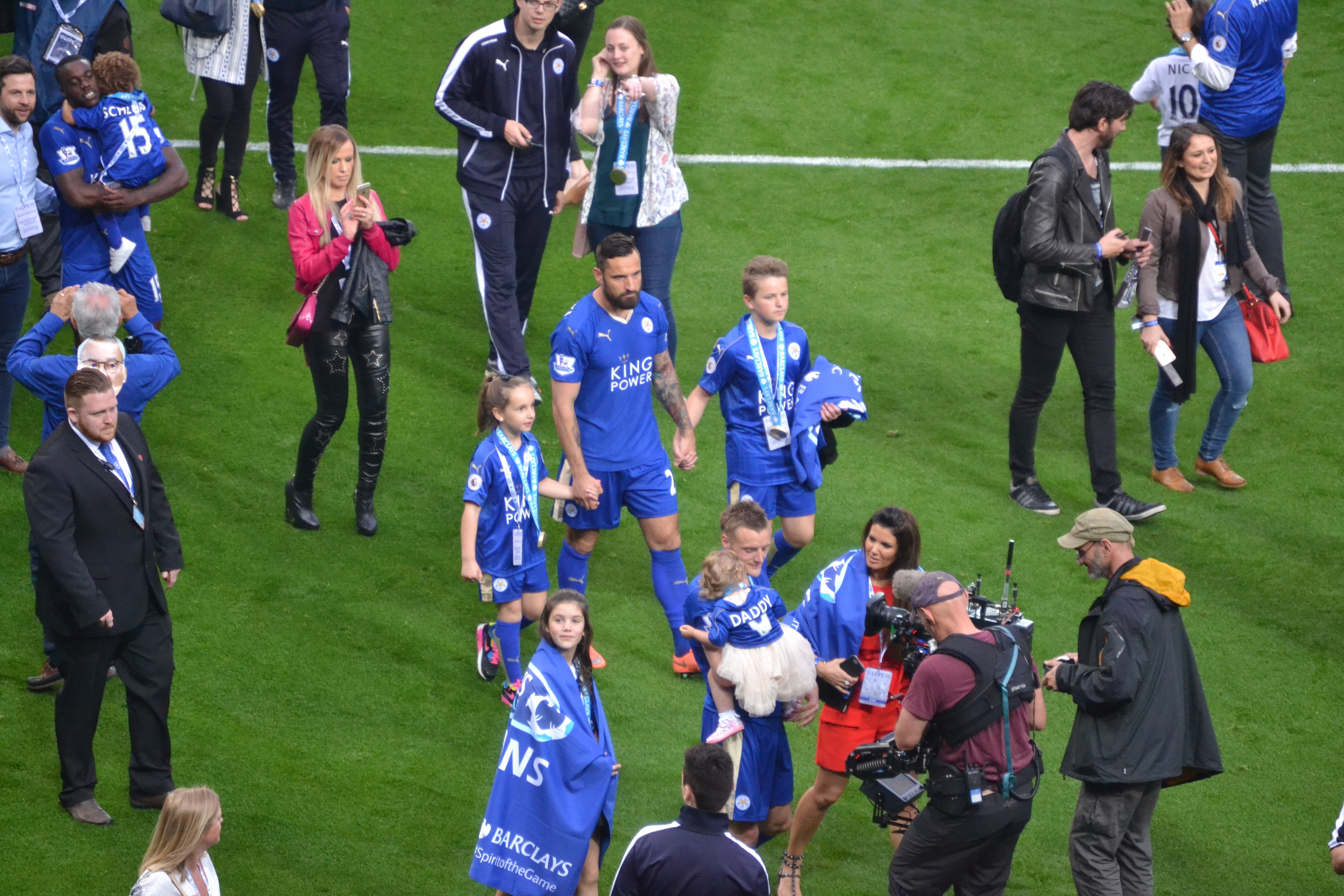
Wasilewski and his family celebrating Leicester's Premier League victory at the King Power Stadium on 7 May 2016

=== Club ===
Appearances and goals by club, season and competition
Club	Season	League			National cup (Note: Includes Polish Cup, Belgian Cup, FA Cup)		Europe		Other		Total	
Club	Season	Division	Apps	Goals	Apps	Goals	Apps	Goals	Apps	Goals	Apps	Goals
Hutnik Kraków	1998–99	I liga	14	0	—		—		—		14	0
Hutnik Kraków	1999–2000	I liga	40	0	1	0	—		—		41	0
Hutnik Kraków	Total		54	0	1	0	—		—		55	0
Śląsk Wrocław	2000–01	Ekstraklasa	25	1	—		—		—		25	1
Śląsk Wrocław	2001–02	Ekstraklasa	26	4	1	1	—		1 (Note: Appearance in Polish League Cup)	0	28	5
Śląsk Wrocław	Total		51	5	1	1	—		1	0	53	6
Wisła Płock	2002–03	Ekstraklasa	24	1	8	0	—		—		32	1
Wisła Płock	2003–04	Ekstraklasa	21	1	1	0	2 (Note: Appearances in UEFA Cup)	0	—		24	1
Wisła Płock	2004–05	Ekstraklasa	15	1	8	0	—		—		23	1
Wisła Płock	Total		60	3	17	0	2	0	—		79	3
Amica Wronki	2005–06	Ekstraklasa	24	4	2	0	—		—		26	4
Lech Poznań	2006–07	Ekstraklasa	14	5	2	0	1 (Note: Appearance in UEFA Intertoto Cup)	0	—		17	5
Anderlecht	2006–07	Belgian Pro League	14	2	0	0	0	0	—		14	2
Anderlecht	2007–08	Belgian Pro League	26	3	0	0	11 (Note: Two appearances in UEFA Champions League, nine appearances and one goal in UEFA Cup)	1	—		37	3
Anderlecht	2008–09	Belgian Pro League	30	8	0	0	1 (Note: Appearance(s) in UEFA Champions League)	0	—		31	8
Anderlecht	2009–10	Belgian Pro League	6	1	0	0	4	0	—		10	1
Anderlecht	2010–11	Belgian Pro League	17	3	0	0	2 (Note: Appearances in UEFA Europa League)	0	—		19	3
Anderlecht	2011–12	Belgian Pro League	30	3	2	0	8	1	—		40	4
Anderlecht	2012–13	Belgian Pro League	22	0	4	0	6	0	1 (Note: Appearance in Belgian Super Cup)	0	33	0
Anderlecht	Total		145	20	6	0	32	2	1	0	184	22
Leicester City	2013–14	Championship	31	0	1	0	—		3 (Note: Appearances in League Cup)	0	35	0
Leicester City	2014–15	Premier League	25	1	2	0	—		1	0	28	1
Leicester City	2015–16	Premier League	4	0	2	1	—		3	0	9	1
Leicester City	2016–17	Premier League	1	0	2	0	1	0	1	0	5	0
Leicester City	Total		61	1	7	1	1	0	8	0	77	2
Wisła Kraków	2017–18	Ekstraklasa	17	1	0	0	—		—		17	1
Wisła Kraków	2018–19	Ekstraklasa	28	0	0	0	—		—		28	0
Wisła Kraków	2019–20	Ekstraklasa	15	0	0	0	—		—		15	0
Wisła Kraków	Total		60	1	0	0	—		—		60	1
Career total			469	39	36	2	37	2	10	0	552	43

=== International ===
Appearances and goals by national team and year
National team	Year	Apps	Goals
Poland
Poland	2002	1	0
Poland	2003	4	0
Poland	2004	1	0
Poland	2005	1	0
Poland	2006	5	1
Poland	2007	11	0
Poland	2008	11	0
Poland	2009	4	1
Poland	2011	6	0
Poland	2012	13	1
Poland	2013	3	0
Total		60	3

Scores and results list Poland's goal tally first, score column indicates score after each Wasilewski goal.

List of international goals scored by Marcin Wasilewski
No.	Date	Venue	Opponent	Score	Result	Competition
1	6 December 2006	Sheikh Zayed Stadium, Abu Dhabi, United Arab Emirates	United Arab Emirates	2–0	5–2	Friendly
2	12 August 2009	Zdzisław Krzyszkowiak Stadium, Bydgoszcz, Poland	Greece	1–0	2–0	Friendly
3	2 June 2012	Pepsi Arena, Warsaw, Poland	Andorra	4–0	4–0	Friendly

== Honours ==
Anderlecht

- Belgian Pro League: 2006–07, 2009–10, 2011–12, 2012–13
- Belgian Cup: 2007–08
- Belgian Super Cup: 2007, 2010, 2012, 2013

Leicester City

- Football League Championship: 2013–14
