= Oladapo Olufemi =

Nigerian footballer

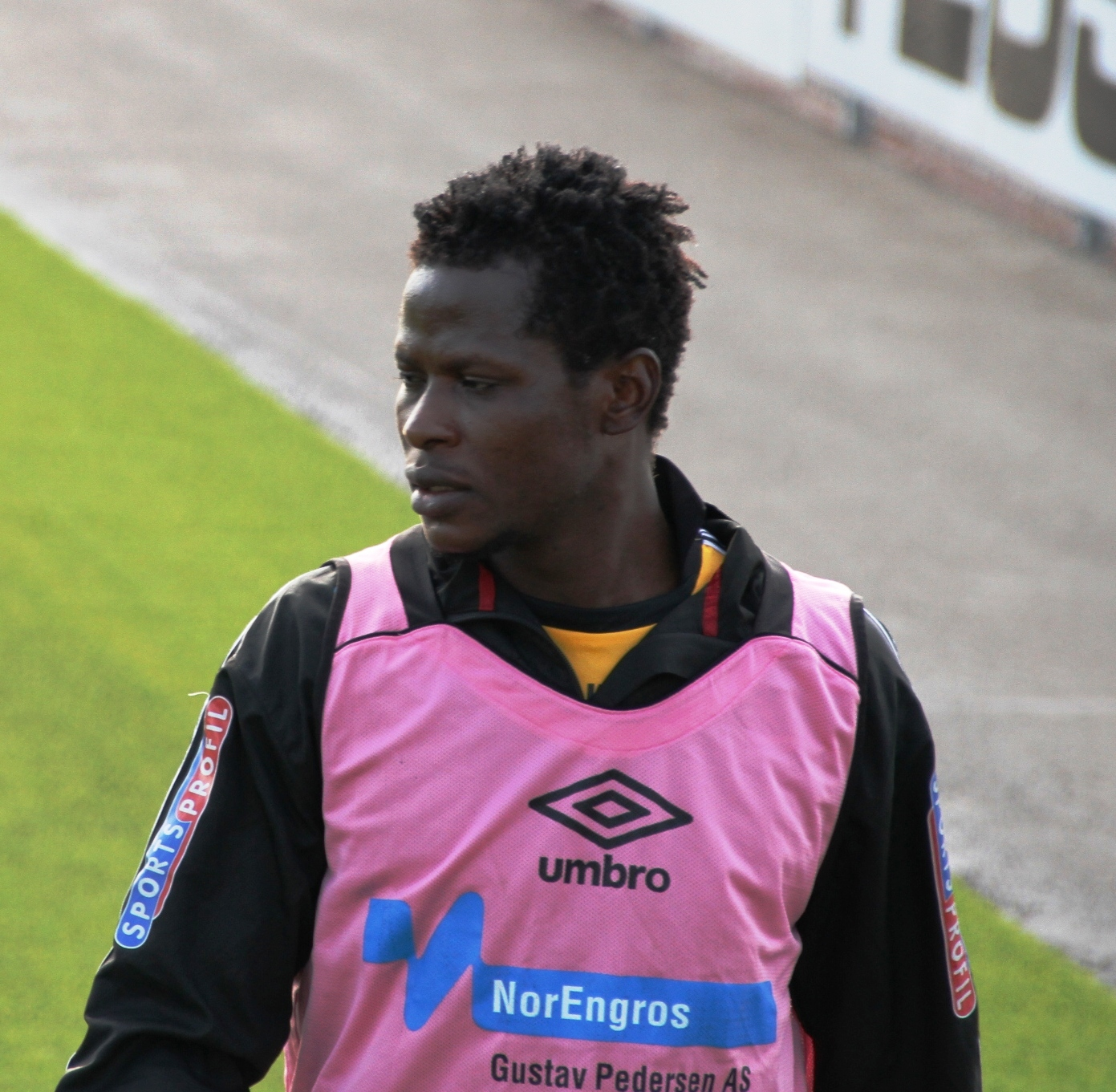

Personal information
- Full name: Oladapo Olufemi Oluyi
- Date of birth: 5 November 1988 (age 37)
- Place of birth: Ibadan
- Height: 1.90 m (6 ft 3 in)
- Positions: Central midfielder; defensive midfielder

Youth career
- –2006: Plateau United

Senior career*
Years	Team	Apps	(Gls)
2006–2007	Anderlecht	1	(0)
2007–2008	Boavista	4	(0)
2009–2012	IK Start	49	(1)
2013	Shooting Stars		
2014	Bayelsa United		
2015	Kwara United		
2016–2018	Enyimba		
Total		54	(1)

International career^{‡}
2007	Nigeria U-20	5	(0)
2008	Nigeria	3	(0)
- * Club domestic league appearances and goals as of 5 May 2013 (UTC) ‡ National team caps and goals as of 18 October 2013

Oladapo Olufemi Oluyi (born 5 November 1988) is a Nigerian footballer. He plays as a central or defensive midfielder.

== Career ==
Olufemi played in Europe for R.S.C. Anderlecht. In July 2007 he moved from the Brussels-based club to Portuguese club Boavista F.C.; He later left and was a free agent. During summer 2009 he went on trial; at IK Start, a Norwegian top-division club, where Solomon Owello was plying his trade. He impressed and was signed on a three-and-a-half-year contract. He signed with Shooting Stars in May 2013, and in December 2013, moved to league rivals Bayelsa United.

== International career ==
Olufemi represented Nigeria at the 2007 FIFA U-20 World Cup in Canada and won a silver medal in the football event at the Summer Olympics in Beijing, however he did not appear in the tournament.

He earned his first cap for Nigeria in a friendly match against Sudan on 9 January 2008.

== Career statistics ==
Club	Season	Division	League		Cup		Total	
Club	Season	Division	Apps	Goals	Apps	Goals	Apps	Goals
2009	Start	Tippeligaen	9	0	0	0	9	0
2010	Start	Tippeligaen	18	0	3	0	21	0
2011	Start	Tippeligaen	7	1	2	0	9	1
2012	Start	Adeccoligaen	15	0	3	0	18	0
Career Total			49	1	8	0	57	1
