= Max von Schlebrügge =

Swedish footballer (born 1977)

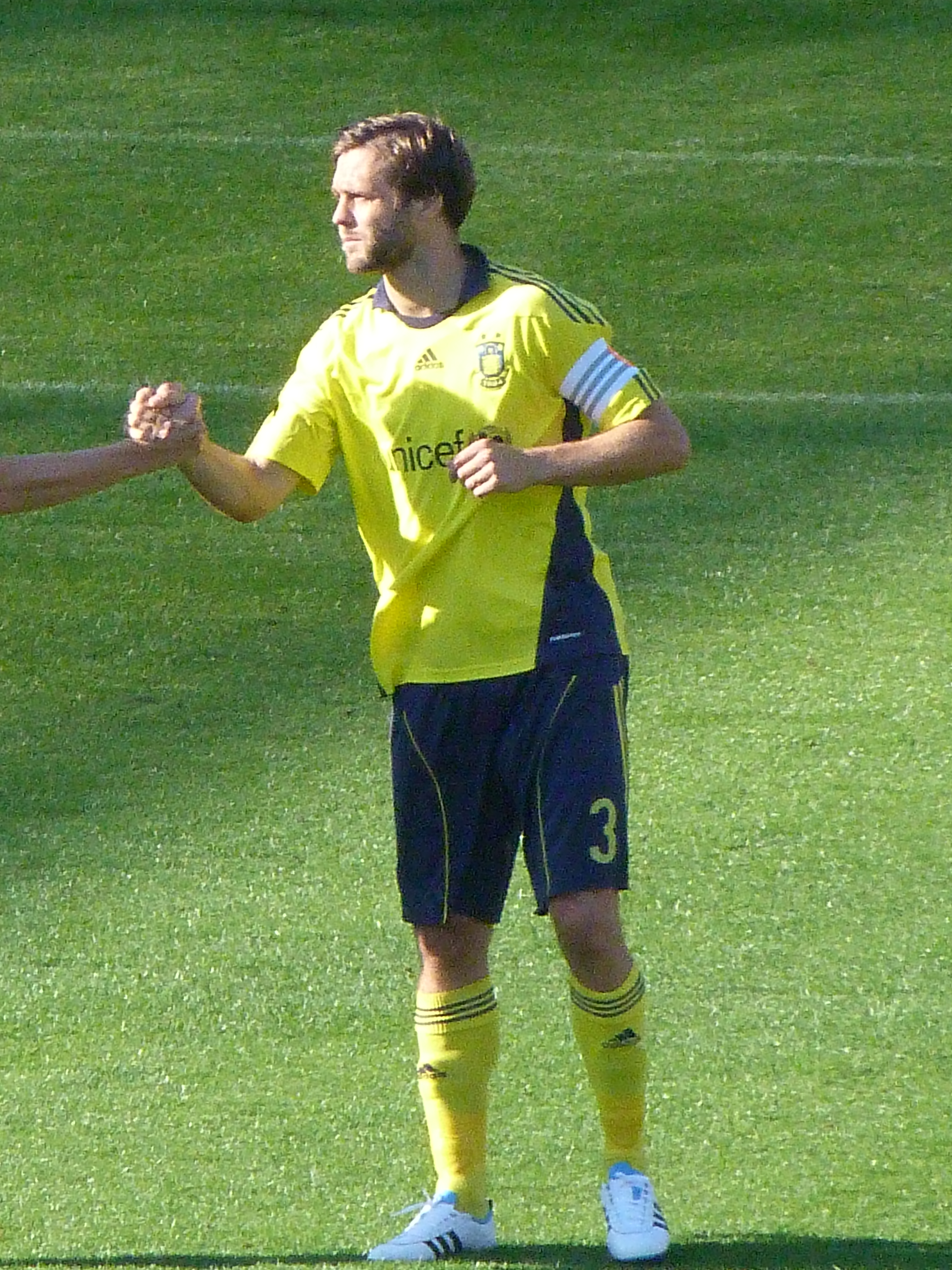

Personal information
- Full name: Max Walter Sebastian von Schlebrügge
- Date of birth: 1 February 1977 (age 49)
- Place of birth: Solna, Sweden
- Height: 1.88 m (6 ft 2 in)
- Position: Centre back

Youth career
- AIK

College career
Years	Team	Apps	(Gls)
1996–1998	Florida Atlantic Owls		

Senior career*
Years	Team	Apps	(Gls)
1998–2002	Brommapojkarna	80	(6)
2002–2006	Hammarby IF	102	(8)
2007	Anderlecht	8	(1)
2008–2012	Brøndby IF	86	(7)
2012–2013	Hammarby IF	20	(3)
2015–2021	IFK Österåker	80	(12)
Total		376	(37)

International career^{‡}
2003–2009	Sweden	10	(0)
- * Club domestic league appearances and goals as of 14 March 2021 ‡ National team caps and goals as of 28 January 2009

Max Walter Sebastian von Schlebrügge (né Holmström; born 1 February 1977) is a Swedish former professional footballer who played as a center back. Starting off his professional career with IF Brommapojkarna in the late 1990s, he went on to represent Hammarby IF, R.S.C. Anderlecht, and Brøndby IF before retiring at IFK Österåker in 2021. A full international between 2003 and 2009, he has won 10 caps for the Sweden national team.

== Club career ==
Born in Solna, von Schlebrügge started off his career with AIK before moving to the United States to play collegiately for the Florida Atlantic Owls. After graduating from Florida Atlantic University, he returned to Sweden to play for Brommapojkarna. In 2002, he signed for the reigning Allsvenskan champions Hammarby IF. After more than 100 Allsvenskan appearances for Hammarby, von Schlebrügge signed with the Jupiler Pro League club Anderlecht in January 2007. He was signed by the Danish Superliga Brøndby IF in January 2008 from Anderlecht after having appeared in only eight league games for the Belgian club.

After four years in Denmark, von Schlebrügge returned to Hammarby in 2012. After two injury-plagued seasons, von Schlebrügge left Hammarby at the end of the 2013 Superettan season. In 2015, von Schlebrügge signed for the lower division team IFK Österåker.

== International career ==
Von Schlebrügge made his debut for the Sweden national team on 18 November 2003, in a friendly game against Egypt. He made his competitive debut for Sweden on 6 June 2007 as a substitute for Mikael Nilsson in the 56th minute of a UEFA Euro 2008 qualifier against Iceland which Sweden won 5–0. He won his 10th and last international cap in a friendly game against the United States on 24 January 2009.

== Personal life ==
Von Schlebrügge's last name comes from his paternal grandmother from Germany, who is an older half-sister of American actress Uma Thurman's mother Nena von Schlebrügge, making Thurman his half-cousin once removed.

== Career statistics ==
=== International ===
Appearances and goals by national team and year
National team	Year	Apps	Goals
Sweden	2003	1	0
Sweden	2004	1	0
Sweden	2005	0	0
Sweden	2006	2	0
Sweden	2007	4	0
Sweden	2008	1	0
Sweden	2009	1	0
Total		10	0

== Honours ==
IFK Österåker

- Division 4 Norra Stockholm: 2016, 2018

Individual

- All-Atlantic Sun Conference – Second Team: 1997
- Atlantic Sun Conference All-Tournament team: 1997
