= Nicolás Frutos =

Argentine footballer and manager

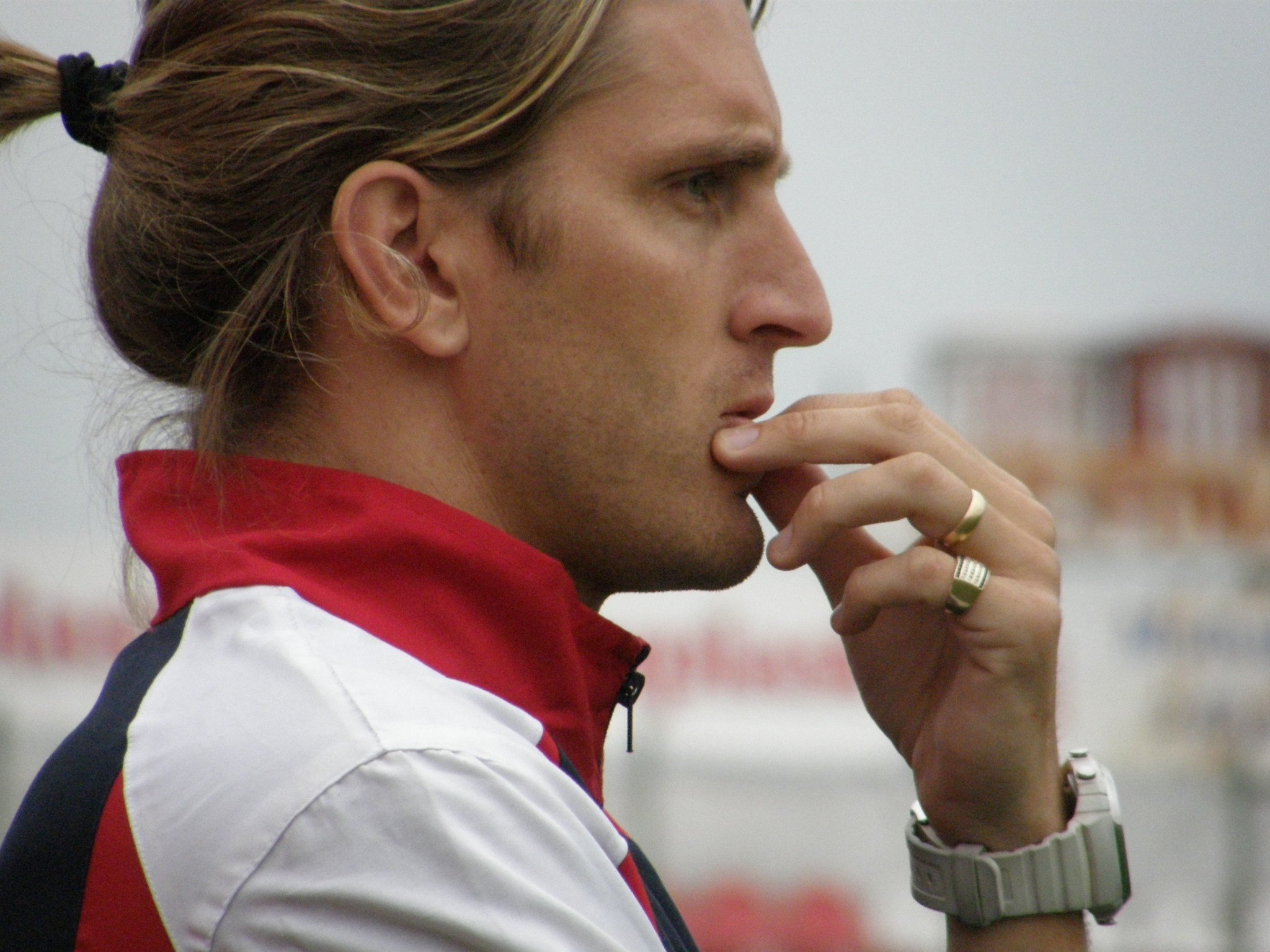
- Portrait of Nicolás Frutos

Personal information
- Full name: Nicolás Alejandro Frutos Cortino
- Date of birth: 10 May 1981 (age 45)
- Place of birth: Santa Fe, Argentina
- Height: 1.94 m (6 ft 4 in)
- Position: Centre forward

Youth career
- –2000: Unión de Santa Fe

Senior career*
Years	Team	Apps	(Gls)
2000–2002	Unión de Santa Fe	41	(8)
2002–2003	San Lorenzo	26	(4)
2003	Nueva Chicago	1	(0)
2003–2004	Las Palmas	18	(1)
2004–2005	Gimnasia y Esgrima	18	(7)
2005–2006	Independiente	28	(19)
2006–2010	Anderlecht	69	(41)
Total		201	(80)

International career
2001	Argentina U20	4	(2)

Managerial career
- 2011–2013: Unión de Santa Fe II
- 2014–2015: Olimpia (assistant)
- 2016: Anderlecht (youth)
- 2016–2017: Anderlecht (assistant)
- 2017: Anderlecht (interim)
- 2019: San Luis de Quillota
- 2020–2021: Anderlecht (assistant)
- 2021–2022: D.C. United (assistant)
- * Club domestic league appearances and goals

Nicolás Alejandro Frutos Cortino (born 10 May 1981) is an Argentine football coach and retired player. A striker during his playing career, he is an assistant coach for Major League Soccer club D.C. United.

== Club career ==
=== Early career ===
Born in Santa Fe, Frutos started playing for Unión de Santa Fe and was later bought by San Lorenzo. Later, Spanish club Las Palmas signed him, but after an unsuccessful season of only one goal Argentina's Gimnasia y Esgrima de La Plata brought him back. He again found his level, catching Independiente's attention, whom he joined for the Apertura 2004, scoring 19 goals in 28 matches.

Frutos was as of 23 October 2005 the top scorer of the Apertura 2005 with nine goals in 11 matches, but he lost that position because he was not able to play for Independiente for the rest of the season.

=== Anderlecht ===
Frutos obtained a transfer from Independiente on 21 October 2005 but was only allowed to play for Anderlecht starting in January 2006.

In his first season with R.S.C. Anderlecht, he scored nine goals in the second half of the season and won the 2005–06 Belgian First Division.

The 2006–07 season yielded more goals for Frutos, as he scored 17 goals in 27 appearances in both the Jupiler League and the UEFA Champions League. His goal-scoring was sorely missed in the early part of the 2007–08 season, until his return in the 2–2 draw against Roeselare, where he was a substitute and scored the goal that leveled the match. Frutos also scored two goals against Hapoel Tel Aviv FC in the UEFA Cup group stage.

At the start of the 2009–10 season, he scored a goal against Süper Lig side Sivasspor during the third-round qualifying match for the UEFA Champions League after coming on as a substitute.

=== Retirement ===
Frutos announced his retirement from professional football on 29 March 2010 at the age of 28 due to tendinopathy of the Achilles tendon, which prevents him from playing at a competitive level.

== Coaching career ==
One day after his retirement, it was announced that Frutos would work as a scout for his last club, R.S.C. Anderlecht. In 2011 he worked for Unión de Santa Fe as a coordinator for the youth teams and manager of their reserve team. He left his position in June 2013.

In 2015, he was a part of the technical staff at Club Olimpia. On 1 January 2016, Frutos returned to Anderlecht and took charge of the U19 team. On 18 September 2017, he was appointed as caretaker manager for the first team. He was in charge for four games, getting three victories and one defeat, before a new manager was appointed on 3 October 2017.

On 3 January 2019, he was appointed as manager of San Luis de Quillota. After adding just four points out of 18 possible, he was fired on 2 April 2019.

In February 2021, Frutos was appointed assistant coach of D.C. United.

== Honours ==
- Belgian First Division A: 2006, 2007, 2010
- Belgian Cup: 2008
- Belgian Super Cup: 2006, 2007
