= 2006 Belgian Super Cup =

2006 Belgian Supercup
Anderlecht	Zulte Waregem
3	1
- Date: 20 December 2006
- Venue: Constant Vanden Stock Stadium, Anderlecht, Brussels
- Referee: Serge Gumienny
- Attendance: 13,400
- Weather: Mostly Cloudy; 3 °C (37 °F)

The 2006 Belgian Supercup was a football match between the winners of the previous season's 2005–06 Belgian First Division and 2005–06 Belgian Cup competitions. It was played and abandoned at halftime on 22 July 2006, due to excessive rain and later replayed from the beginning on 20 December 2006. The match was contested by cup winners Zulte Waregem and league champions Anderlecht. Both matches were played at the ground of the league champions as usual, in this case the Constant Vanden Stock Stadium.

Anderlecht won its seventh Supercup title, as it beat Zulte Waregem in the (replayed) match by a score of 3–1 through goals from Ahmed Hassan, Juhász and Siani.

== Details ==
20 December 2006
20:30 CEST

Anderlecht	3–1	Zulte Waregem
Hassan 35' (pen.); Juhász 77'; Siani 90+2'	Report	Vandendriessche 50'

Constant Vanden Stock Stadium, Anderlecht, Brussels
Attendance: 13,400
Referee: Serge Gumienny

Anderlecht	Zulte Waregem

GK	22	(Belgium) Davy Schollen
RB	31	(Belgium) Mark De Man
CB	23	(Hungary) Roland Juhász
CB	3	(Belgium) Olivier Deschacht
LB	6	(Belgium) Jelle Van Damme
RM	8	(Argentina) Cristian Leiva	(substituted off) 86'
CM	5	(Argentina) Lucas Biglia	(substituted off) 61'
LM	14	(Belgium) Bart Goor (c)	(substituted off) 91'
RF	16	(Nigeria) Oladapo Olufemi	(substituted off) 58'
CF	10	(Egypt) Ahmed Hassan	(substituted off) 88'
LF	38	(Belgium) Roland Lamah	(substituted off) 58'
Substitutes:
GK		(Czech Republic) Daniel Zítka
MF	42	(Cameroon) Sébastien Siani	(substituted on) 58'
RB	4	(Belgium) Yves Vanderhaeghe	(substituted on) 61'
CF	39	(Belgium) Vadis Odjidja-Ofoe	(substituted on) 86'
DM	29	(Argentina) Nicolás Frutos	(substituted on) 88'
CF	99	(Ivory Coast) Bakary Saré	(substituted on) 91'
CF	18	(Tunisia) Sami Allagui	(substituted on) 58'
Manager:
(Belgium) Franky Vercauteren

GK	23	(Belgium) Sammy Bossut
RB	17	(Belgium) Lander Van Steenbrugghe	(yellow card) 8'	(substituted off) 83'
CB	4	(Belgium) Stefan Leleu (c)
CB	22	(France) Frédéric Dindeleux
LB	13	(Belgium) Bart Buysse		(substituted off) 46'
RM	9	(France) Matthieu Verschuère
CM	19	(Belgium) Jonas Vandermarliere
CM	3	(Belgium) Karel D'Haene
LM	5	(France) Loris Reina
CF	20	(Nigeria) Mohammed Aliyu Datti		(substituted off) 46'
CF	24	(Peru) Juan Diego González-Vigil		(substituted off) 46'
Substitutes:
GK		(Belgium) Pieter Merlier
CM	26	(Belgium) Giuseppe Riolo		(substituted on) 83'
CM	16	(Belgium) Wouter Vandendriessche		(substituted on) 46'
CF	7	(Belgium) Tim Matthys		(substituted on) 46'
CF	11	(Belgium) Cédric Roussel		(substituted on) 46'
Manager:
(Belgium) Francky Dury

== Abandoned Match Details ==
Originally, the match was to be played on 22 July 2006, but stopped at halftime due to excessive rain and thunderstorms 25 °C (77 °F). At that point, no goals had been made.

22 July 2006
20:30 CET

Anderlecht	Abandoned (0–0)	Zulte Waregem
	Report

Constant Vanden Stock Stadium, Anderlecht, Brussels
Attendance: 20,000
Referee: Johny Ver Eecke

GK	(Czech Republic) Daniel Zítka
CM	(Morocco) Mbark Boussoufa
CB	(Belgium) Olivier Deschacht
CF	(Egypt) Ahmed Hassan
CB	(Hungary) Roland Juhász
LM	(Belgium) Bart Goor
CF	(Burundi) Mohammed Tchité
DM	(Ivory Coast) Cheick Tioté
LB	(Belgium) Jelle Van Damme
RM	(Belgium) Anthony Vanden Borre
CD	(Belgium) Yves Vanderhaeghe
Substitutes:
GK	(Belgium) Davy Schollen
CF	(Tunisia) Sami Allagui
CM	(Argentina) Lucas Biglia
LM	(Czech Republic) Martin Kolář
CF	(Belgium) Mbo Mpenza
CM	(Belgium) Vadis Odjidja-Ofoe
Manager:
(Belgium) Franky Vercauteren

GK	(Belgium) Geert De Vlieger
CB	(Belgium) Tjörven De Brul
CM	(Belgium) Nathan D'Haemers
CM	(Belgium) Karel D'Haene
CB	(Belgium) Chris Janssens
LM	(Belgium) Stijn Meert
CB	(Belgium) Stijn Minne
LM	(France) Loris Reina
CF	(Belgium) Cédric Roussel
CM	(Belgium) Tony Sergeant
DM	(Belgium) Ludwin Van Nieuwenhuyze
Substitutes:
LB	(Belgium) Bart Buysse
CB	(France) Frédéric Dindeleux
CB	(Belgium) Stefan Leleu
CF	(Belgium) Tim Matthys
CM	(Belgium) Wouter Vandendriessche
CM	(Belgium) Jonas Vandermarliere
Manager:
(Belgium) Francky Dury

== See also ==
- 2006–07 Belgian First Division
- 2006–07 Belgian Cup
