= 2006 Belgian Cup final =

- Event: 2005–06 Belgian Cup
Zulte Waregem	Mouscron
2	1
- Date: 13 May 2006
- Venue: King Baudouin Stadium, Brussels
- Referee: Paul Allaerts
- Attendance: 24,000

The 2006 Belgian Cup final, took place on 13 May 2006 between Zulte Waregem and Mouscron. It was the 51st Belgian Cup final and was won by Zulte Waregem due to an injury time winner by Tim Matthys.

== Route to the final ==
Zulte Waregem				Mouscron
Opponent	Result	Legs	Round	Opponent	Result	Legs
Club Brugge	2–1	2–1 home	Sixth round	Torhout (III)	2–1	2–1 home
Verbroedering Geel (II)	1–0	1–0 away	Seventh round	Mons (II)	2–1	2–1 home
Westerlo	4–3	3–0 home; 1–3 away (a.e.t.)	Quarter-finals	Beveren	2–0	0–0 home; 2–0 away
Standard Liège	2–2 (away goals)	2–1 away; 0–1 home	Semi-finals	Charleroi	2–1	1–0 away; 1–1 home

== Match ==
=== Details ===
13 May 2006
20:30 CEST

Zulte Waregem	2–1	Mouscron
Leleu 11'; Matthys 90+1'	Report	Čustović 62'

King Baudouin Stadium, Brussels
Attendance: 24,000
Referee: Paul Allaerts

Zulte Waregem	Mouscron

GK	1	(Belgium) Pieter Merlier
RB	2	(Belgium) Stijn Minne
CB	12	(Belgium) Tjörven De Brul	Booked
CB	4	(Belgium) Stefan Leleu (c)
LB	3	(Belgium) Frédéric Dupré
RM	9	(France) Matthieu Verschuere		(substituted off) 70'
CM	6	(Belgium) Ludwin Van Nieuwenhuyze
CM	8	(Belgium) Tony Sergeant
LM	10	(Belgium) Stijn Meert
CF	7	(Belgium) Tim Matthys
CF	20	(Ghana) Ibrahim Salou
Substitutes:
MF	16	(Belgium) Wouter Vandendriessche		(substituted on) 70'
GK		(Belgium) Bjorn Sengier
FW		(French Guiana) Sylvio Breleur
DF		(France) Frédéric Dindeleux
DF		(Belgium) Michaël Wiggers
Manager:
(Belgium) Francky Dury

GK	1	(France) Patrice Luzi
RB	3	(Belgium) Jean-Philippe Charlet		(substituted off) 60'
CB	18	(France) Geoffray Toyes
CB	12	(Belgium) Olivier Besengez	Booked	(substituted off) 60'
LB	20	(France) David Grondin
RW	25	(France) Jean-Félix Dorothée
CM	4	(Belgium) Steve Dugardein (c)
CM	17	(Cameroon) Patrice Noukeu	Booked
LW	16	(Belgium) Francisco Sanchez d'Avolio
RF	7	(Bosnia and Herzegovina) Adnan Čustović
LF	30	(Poland) Marcin Żewłakow
Substitutes:
DF	24	(France) Kevin Hatchi		(substituted on) 60'
FW	26	(Belgium) Patrick Dimbala		(substituted on) 60'
GK		(Belgium) Christophe Martin
FW		(Brazil) Taílson
FW		(Brazil) Giba
DF		(Belgium) Daan van Gijseghem
Manager:
(Belgium) Gil Vandenbrouck

Match rules

- 90 minutes.
- 30 minutes of extra time if necessary.
- Penalty shoot-out if scores still level.
- Seven named substitutes.
- Maximum of three substitutions.
