= 2005–06 Standard Liège season =

Standard Liège
2005–06 season
- Manager: Dominique D'Onofrio
- First Division: 2nd
- Belgian Cup: Semi-finals
- Top goalscorer: Mohammed Tchité (16)

Standard Liège had a successful season, qualifying for the UEFA Champions League pre-group stage phase, thanks to a 2nd-place finish in the First Division. This was the last season for Dominique D'Onofrio in charge of Standard, leaving at the end of the season, to be replaced by Johan Boskamp.

== Squad ==
=== Goalkeepers ===
- (Belgium) Olivier Renard
- (Croatia) Vedran Runje

=== Defenders ===
- (Portugal) Jorge Costa
- (Belgium) Philippe Léonard
- (France) Mathieu Béda
- (Senegal) Mohamed Sarr
- (Serbia and Montenegro) Ivica Dragutinović
- (United States) Oguchi Onyewu
- (Belgium) Eric Deflandre
- (Brazil) Michel
- (Croatia) Lovre Vulin

=== Midfielders ===
- (Croatia) Milan Rapaić
- (Belgium) Karel Geraerts
- (France) Christian Negouai
- (Portugal) Sérgio Conceição
- (Belgium) Jonathan Walasiak
- (Brazil) Carlos Alberto
- (France) Siramana Dembélé
- (Ukraine) Serhiy Kovalenko

=== Attackers ===
- (Burundi) Mohammed Tchité
- (Guinea) Sambégou Bangoura
- (Portugal) Almami Moreira
- (Romania) Daniel Niculae
- (Brazil) Igor de Camargo

== First League ==
=== Matches ===
1	Standard Liège	3–1	Lierse
	Tchité 5'; Geraerts 44'; Conceição 89'		Imschoot 24'

2	Zulte Waregem	1–2	Standard Liège
	Meert 5'		Tchité 90 + 1'; Michel 90 + 3'

3	Standard Liège	2–0	Sint-Truiden
	Conceição 75'; Bangoura 90'

4	La Louvière	2–3	Standard Liège
	Guilmot 54'; Sánchez 83'		Tchité 6, 31, 86'

5	Standard Liège	1–3	Beveren
	Tchité 44'		Sanogo 22, 48'; Né 67'

6	Cercle Brugge	0–3	Standard Liège
			Tchité 6'; Conceição 14'; Walasiak 47'

7	Standard Liège	2–0	Club Brugge
	Onyewu 16'; Léonard 23'

8	Germinal Beerschot	2–2	Standard Liège
	De Wree 38'; Dickson 40'		Conceição 34'; Cvitanović 47' (o.g.)

9	Standard Liège	2–1	Lokeren
	Tchité 31, 88'		Zanzan 51'

10	Genk	0–1	Standard Liège
			Tchité 5'

11	Standard Liège	1–0	Charleroi
	Conceição 65'

12	Mouscron	2–1	Standard Liège
	Noukeu 7'; Fellahi 55'		Tchité 46'

13	Standard Liège	1–0	Westerlo
	Moreira 79'

14	Brussels	3–1	Standard Liège
	Léonard 38' (o.g.); Gorius 43'; Niçoise 89'		Conceição 25'

15	Standard Liège	2–0	Anderlecht
	Moreira 14'; Juhász 59' (o.g.)

16	Standard Liège	0–0	Roeselare

17	Gent	2–1	Standard Liège
	Grégoire 44'; Zoko 62'		Rapaić 13'

18	Lierse	0–2	Standard Liège
			Geraerts 39'; Tchité 90'

19	Standard Liège	1–2	Zulte Waregem
	Niculae 74'		D'Haemers 50'; Sergeant 75'

20	Sint-Truiden	0–0	Standard Liège

21	Standard Liège	1–1	La Louvière
	Niculae 62'		Durieux 72'

22	Beveren	0–2	Standard Liège
			Rapaić 59' (pen.); Niculae 80'

23	Standard Liège	7–1	Cercle Brugge
	Rapaić 5', 34', 38' (pen.) de Camargo 22'; Tchité 46, 56'; Kovalenko 86'		Ibad 54'

24	Club Brugge	1–1	Standard Liège
	Leko 31'		Onyewu 43'

25	Standard Liège	3–1	Germinal Beerschot
	Conceição 2'; Tchité 15'; Vulin 84'		Messoudi 55'

26	Lierse	0–0	Standard Liège

27	Standard Liège	1–0	Genk
	Niculae 30'

28	Charleroi	0–0	Standard Liège

29	Standard Liège	2–1	Mouscron
	Negouai 10'; Tchité 39'		dos Santos 89'

30	Westerlo	0–2	Standard Liège
			Negouai 1'; Rapaić 63'

31	Standard Liège	1–0	Brussels
	Rapaić 24'

32	Anderlecht	2–0	Standard Liège
	Serhat 33'; Zetterberg 58'

33	Roeselare	0–0	Standard Liège

34	Standard Liège	0–2	Gent
			Grégoire 23'; Pavlović 31'

=== Top Scorers ===
- (Burundi) Mohammed Tchité 16
- (Croatia) Milan Rapaić 7 (1)
- (Portugal) Sérgio Conceição 7
- (Romania) Daniel Niculae 4

== Sources ==
- RSSSF - Belgium 2005/06
