= Carlos Almeida =

Carlos Almeida may refer to:

- Carlos Almeida (basketball) (born 1976), Angolan basketball shooting guard
- Carlos Almeida (politician), Indian politician from the state of Goa
- Carlos Almeida (swimmer) (born 1988), Portuguese swimmer
- Carlos Almeida (athlete) (born 1968), Cape Verdean long-distance runner
- Carlos Alberto de Almeida (born 1980), Brazilian footballer
- Carlos de Almeida (born 1969), Brazilian Olympic rower
