= Ludwin Van Nieuwenhuyze =

Belgian footballer

Personal information
- Full name: Ludwin Van Nieuwenhuyze
- Date of birth: 25 February 1978 (age 48)
- Place of birth: Waregem, Belgium
- Height: 1.84 m (6 ft 0 in)
- Position: Defensive midfielder

Youth career
- 1990–1996: RC Harelbeke

Senior career*
Years	Team	Apps	(Gls)
1996–1998	RC Harelbeke	6	(0)
1999–2004	VW Hamme	158	(32)
2004–2011	SV Zulte Waregem	208	(16)
2011–2014	Oudenaarde	72	(1)
- * Club domestic league appearances and goals

Ludwin Van Nieuwenhuyze (born 25 February 1978 in Waregem) is a Belgian professional former football player who played as a defensive midfielder. He played for K.S.V. Oudenaarde.

Before turning professional, Van Nieuwenhuyze was active in the construction sector. When Van Nieuwenhuyze won the Belgian Cup with Zulte Waregem in 2005–06, he and several other teammates were still not professional footballers.

== Honours ==
Zulte Waregem

- Belgian Cup: 2005–06
