= Daniel Zítka =

Czech footballer and coach

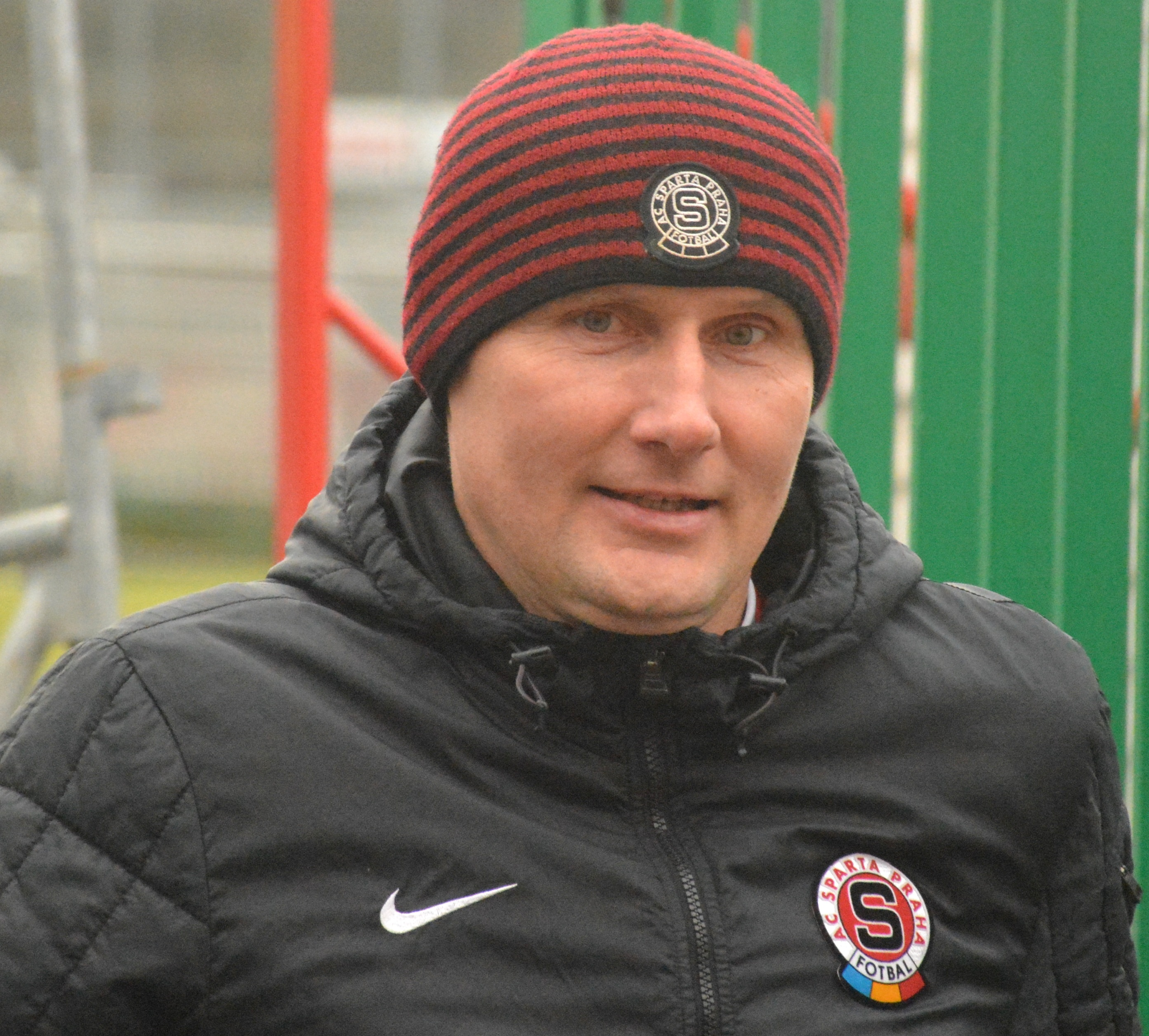
- Zítka in 2017

Personal information
- Date of birth: 20 June 1975 (age 51)
- Place of birth: Havířov, Czechoslovakia
- Height: 1.96 m (6 ft 5 in)
- Position: Goalkeeper

Youth career
- 1985–1994: Baník Havířov

Senior career*
Years	Team	Apps	(Gls)
1994–1995	FK Viktoria Žižkov	1	(0)
1995–1997	FC Svit Zlín	38	(0)
1997–1999	Tatran Prešov	43	(0)
1999–2002	Lokeren	59	(0)
2002–2010	Anderlecht	143	(0)
2010–2012	Sparta Prague	4	(0)
Total		288	(0)

International career
1994–1996	Czech Republic U21	2	(0)
2007–2008	Czech Republic	3	(0)
- * Club domestic league appearances and goals

Daniel Zítka (born 20 June 1975) is a Czech former professional footballer who played as a goalkeeper. He played three matches for the Czech Republic. He worked as a goalkeeper coach for AC Sparta Prague.

== Career ==
Zítka began his career at FK Havířov and in 1994 moved to FK Viktoria Žižkov where he accumulated only one league start. He played in the first round of the 1994–95 UEFA Cup Winners' Cup against Chelsea, conceding four goals in a 4–2 first leg defeat in London. The following year, he signed with FC Zlín and in November 1997 transferred to Tatran Prešov in Slovakia.

Two years later, Zítka moved to Belgium, to K.S.C. Lokeren OV. From Lokeren he was recruited by R.S.C. Anderlecht scouts in 2002. Following his arrival at Anderlecht, he was in competition with Tristan Peersman, Zvonko Milojević, Željko Pavlović, Jan Van Steenberghe and Silvio Proto, but remained a first-team regular

On 3 May 2010, he joined Sparta Prague from Anderlecht on a two-year deal.

== Honours ==
Anderlecht

- Belgian First Division: 2003–04, 2005–06, 2006–07, 2009–10
- Belgian Cup: 2007–08
- Belgian Supercup: 2006, 2007

Individual

- Man of the Season (Belgian First Division): 2006–07
- Belgian Professional Goalkeeper of the Year: 2006
- Keeper of the Season: 2006–07
