= Stijn Meert =

Belgian footballer

Personal information
- Date of birth: 6 April 1978 (age 48)
- Place of birth: Kortrijk, Belgium
- Height: 1.77 m (5 ft 10 in)
- Position: Left winger

Team information
- Current team: Torhout (manager)

Senior career*
Years	Team	Apps	(Gls)
1995–1999	Kortrijk	70	(4)
1999–2002	Anderlecht	11	(0)
1999–2000	→ MVV (loan)	13	(0)
2000–2001	→ Sint-Truiden (loan)	0	(0)
2002–2012	Zulte Waregem	218	(25)
2011–2012	→ Mouscron-Péruwelz (loan)	21	(3)
2012–2013	Oudenaarde	27	(0)

Managerial career
- 2013–2018: Zulte Waregem II
- 2018–2019: Roeselare II
- 2019–2020: Oudenaarde
- 2021–: Torhout
- * Club domestic league appearances and goals

Stijn Meert (born 6 April 1978) is a Belgian professional football manager and former player. He is currently the manager of Belgian Division 3 club Torhout.

He spent most of his club career playing for Zulte Waregem in the Belgian Pro League but as of 2012 is playing for Oudenaarde in the Belgian Second Division.

After his playing career, he continued as a manager. He started managing the reserves of Zulte Waregem in 2013. In 2019, he was appointed the new coach of Oudenaarde. In January 2021, Meert became manager of Torhout.

== Honours ==
Zulte Waregem

- Belgian Cup: 2005–06
