= Pieter Merlier =

Belgian footballer

Personal information
- Date of birth: 29 March 1979 (age 47)
- Place of birth: Sint-Eloois-Vijve, Belgium
- Height: 1.80 m (5 ft 11 in)
- Position: Goalkeeper

Team information
- Current team: SK Berlare

Youth career
- 1987–2000: KSV Waregem
- 2000–2001: SC Wielsbeke

Senior career*
Years	Team	Apps	(Gls)
2001–2007	Zulte Waregem	50	(0)
2007	Maccabi Herzliya	3	(0)
2008–2009	Universitatea Cluj	20	(0)
2009–2010	Universitatea Craiova	5	(0)
2010–2011	Olsa Brakel	10	(0)
2011–2013	Oudenaarde	63	(0)
2013–2014	VW Hamme	26	(0)
2014–2018	Sporting West Harelbeke		
2018–	SK Berlare		
- * Club domestic league appearances and goals as of 2 February 2019

Pieter Merlier (born 29 March 1979) is a Belgian football goalkeeper, currently under contract at SK Berlare.

Merlier previously played for S.V. Zulte Waregem in the Belgian First Division.

== Honours ==
Zulte Waregem

- Belgian Second Division: 2004–05
- Belgian Cup: 2005–06
