= Björn Sengier =

Belgian footballer

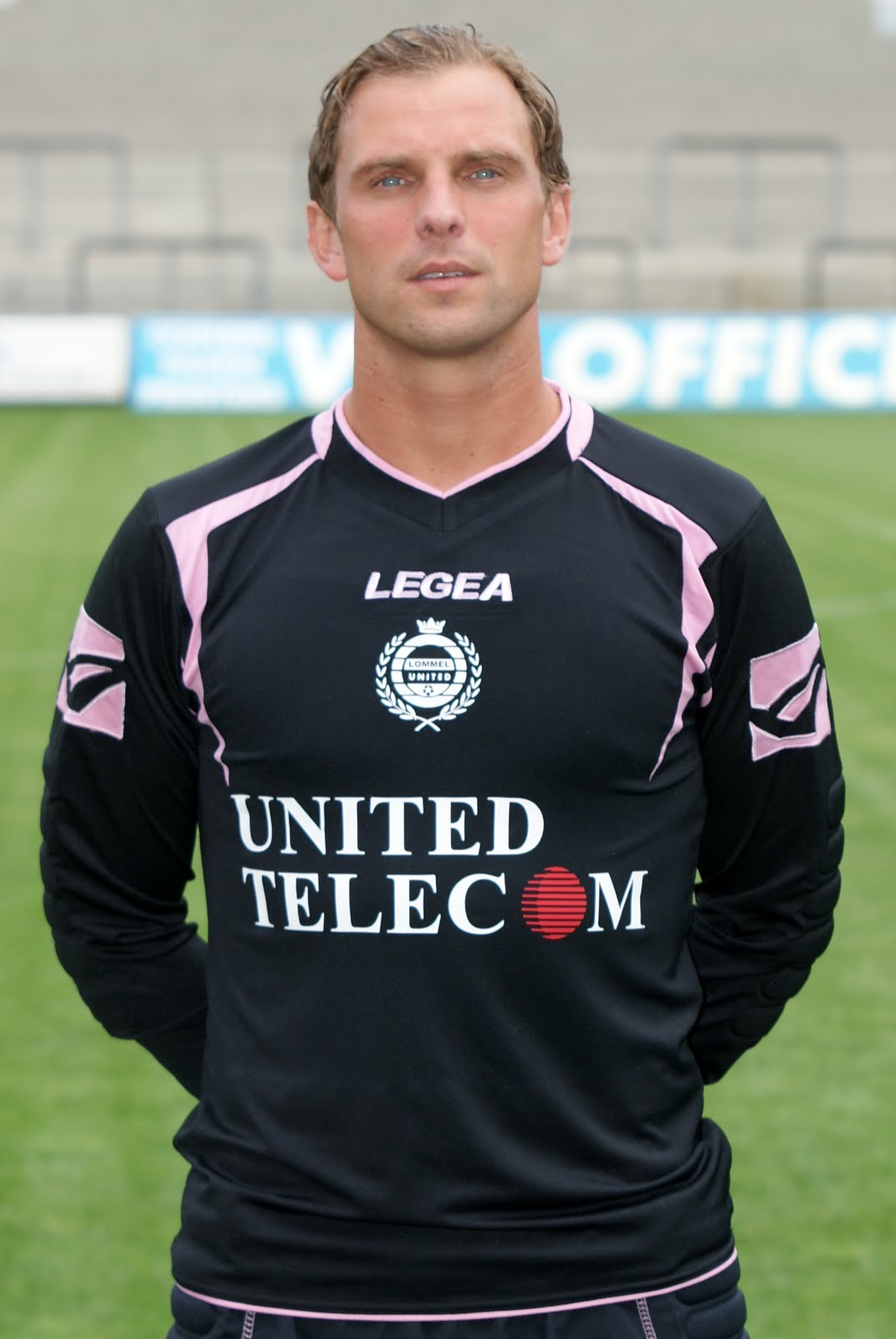

Personal information
- Full name: Björn Sengier
- Date of birth: 12 July 1979 (age 47)
- Place of birth: Ghent, Belgium
- Height: 1.88 m (6 ft 2 in)
- Position: Goalkeeper

Youth career
- KFC Eeklo
- Cercle Brugge

Senior career*
Years	Team	Apps	(Gls)
1998–1999	Cercle Brugge	0	(0)
1999–2003	FCN Sint-Niklaas	?	(?)
2003–2005	Deinze	22	(0)
2005–2006	Zulte Waregem	10	(0)
2006–2008	Willem II	23	(0)
2008–2011	KVSK United	68	(0)
2011–2012	Helmond Sport	34	(0)
2012–2013	Royal Antwerp	50	(0)
2014	Berchem Sport	12	(0)
2014–2016	KSC Hasselt	10	(0)

Managerial career
- 2016–2017: KSC Hasselt (assistant)
- * Club domestic league appearances and goals

Björn Sengier (born 12 July 1979) is a retired Belgian footballer who played as a goalkeeper.

== Career ==
Sengier is a goalkeeper who was born in Ghent and made his debut in professional football, being part of the Cercle Brugge squad in the 1999–2000 season. He also played for K.M.S.K. Deinze and Zulte Waregem before joining Willem II. He left Willem II in September 2008, and moved to K.V.S.K. United Overpelt-Lommel.
