= Stijn Minne =

Belgian footballer

Personal information
- Date of birth: 29 June 1978 (age 48)
- Place of birth: Jabbeke, Belgium
- Height: 1.71 m (5 ft 7 in)
- Position: Defender

Senior career*
Years	Team	Apps	(Gls)
1999–2002	Maldegem	87	(0)
2002–2012	Zulte Waregem	215	(1)
2012–2014	Westerlo	26	(0)
2014	→ Geel (loan)	13	(0)
2014–2015	Standaard Wetteren		
2015–2016	RFC Wetteren		
2016–2020	Voorwaarts Zwevezele		
- * Club domestic league appearances and goals as of 3 January 2016

Stijn Minne (born 29 June 1978) is a Belgian football defender. He spent 10 years playing for Zulte Waregem.

== Honours ==
Zulte Waregem

- Belgian Cup: 2005–06
