= Sérgio Conceição =

Portuguese football manager (born 1974)

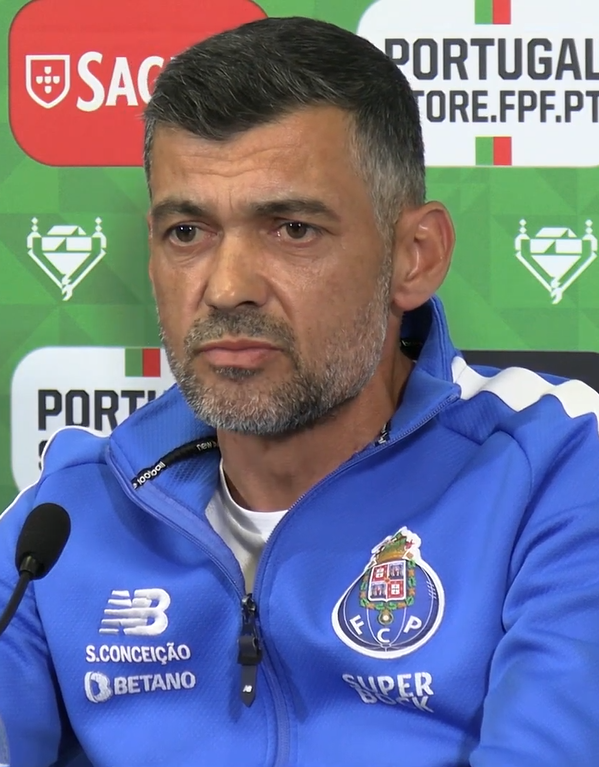
- Conceição as Porto manager in 2023

Personal information
- Full name: Sérgio Paulo Marceneiro da Conceição
- Date of birth: 15 November 1974 (age 51)
- Place of birth: Coimbra, Portugal
- Height: 1.78 m (5 ft 10 in)
- Position: Winger

Youth career
- 1986–1991: Académica
- 1991–1993: Porto

Senior career*
Years	Team	Apps	(Gls)
1993–1998	Porto	56	(9)
1993–1994	→ Penafiel (loan)	30	(1)
1994–1995	→ Leça (loan)	24	(3)
1995–1996	→ Felgueiras (loan)	30	(4)
1998–2000	Lazio	63	(7)
2000–2001	Parma	25	(5)
2001–2003	Inter Milan	42	(1)
2003–2004	Lazio	7	(0)
2004	Porto	11	(0)
2004–2007	Standard Liège	74	(21)
2007	Qadsia	7	(0)
2008–2010	PAOK	41	(5)
Total		410	(61)

International career
1995–1996	Portugal U21	7	(1)
1996–2003	Portugal	56	(12)

Managerial career
- 2010–2011: Standard Liège (assistant)
- 2012–2013: Olhanense
- 2013–2014: Académica
- 2014–2015: Braga
- 2015–2016: Vitória Guimarães
- 2016–2017: Nantes
- 2017–2024: Porto
- 2024–2025: AC Milan
- 2025–2026: Al-Ittihad
Medal record
Men's football
Representing Portugal
UEFA European Under-18 Championship
Runner-up	1992 Germany
- * Club domestic league appearances and goals

Sérgio Paulo Marceneiro da Conceição (/ˈsɛrʒioʊ ˌkɒnseɪˈsaʊn/ SERR-zhee-oh kon-say-SOWN; European Portuguese pronunciation: [ˈsɛɾʒiu kõsɐjˈsɐ̃w]; born 15 November 1974) is a Portuguese professional football manager and former player who played as a right winger.

Throughout his career, he played for ten teams in five countries. After gaining international recognition with Porto he switched to Italy, where he appeared for three clubs, winning domestic and European honours at Lazio. He amassed Primeira Liga totals of 97 games and 13 goals over four seasons, adding 136 matches and 13 goals in Serie A. Having won 56 caps for Portugal, he represented the nation at Euro 2000 and the 2002 World Cup, reaching the semi-finals of the former.

In 2012, Conceição started working as a manager, leading five teams in his nation's top flight and Nantes in Ligue 1. He set the record for most games as manager of Porto, winning 11 honours including three league titles and the double in 2019–20 and 2021–22. After leaving in June 2024, he joined AC Milan in December that year, being dismissed six months later.

== Early life ==
Born in Coimbra, and raised in Ribeira de Frades, Conceição began his career with the youth teams of hometown's Académica. Son of a bricklayer father and a homemaker mother and one of eight siblings, as a child he was a fan of Sporting CP.

Conceição's father died in a motorbike accident when he was 16, the day after he joined Porto's academy. His mother, who used a wheelchair due to health problems, died two years after the former's death, and his younger brother also died when Conceição was still a teenager, an event he later described as "the most difficult moment" of his life. "I thought about quitting football (...) I felt lost at the time."

== Club career ==
=== Porto ===
Conceição started playing professionally in the Liga de Honra on loan at Penafiel and Leça. He had his first Primeira Liga experience with Felgueiras, scoring four goals while they were relegated in 1995–96.

Returned to Porto, Conceição's runs down the right flank, combined with a good scoring record, helped them to back-to-back national championships and a Taça de Portugal triumph.

=== Italy ===
Conceição joined Lazio in 1998 and won the Supercoppa Italiana on his debut, scoring the winner in a 2–1 away win against Juventus on 28 August; he said that he was so unknown in Italy at the time that he was mistaken for the Brazilian Flávio Conceição. He played a significant part in their 1998–99 UEFA Cup Winners' Cup success, while also netting five times in 33 games in his first season in Serie A, his account in the domestic campaign being opened on 18 October with a brace in the 5–3 victory at Inter Milan. He also helped the team to a Scudetto, a Coppa Italia (in a 1999–2000 conquest of the double) and the 1999 UEFA Super Cup.

In July 2000, Conceição and Matías Almeyda transferred to Parma along with £16 million as part of a £40 million package deal that saw Hernán Crespo join Lazio. In his only season with the Ducati, he scored the opening goal on his debut, a 2–0 away defeat of Macedonia's Pobeda on 14 September in the first round of the UEFA Cup. His side reached the cup final, which they lost to Fiorentina 2–1 on aggregate with his campaign ending through injury in the first leg; he was subsequently linked to Manchester United, Juventus and Milan.

Before 2001–02, Conceição was used in exchange for the transfer of Sébastien Frey, which saw him go to Inter with 10 billion lire (£3.1 million) while the French goalkeeper went in the other direction. After two seasons and a good number of starts, he left by mutual agreement and re-joined Lazio, leaving for former club Porto towards the end of 2003–04, again by mutual consent, and adding his third Portuguese national championship. He was ineligible for their UEFA Champions League triumph having already represented Lazio in that year's competition, but scored his only goal of his second spell from the penalty spot on his debut on 21 January in a 4–0 win at the Estádio das Antas in the last 16 of the national cup, eventually losing the final to Benfica.

=== Later career ===
In summer 2004, Conceição signed for Belgium's Standard Liège on a one-year deal. He won the Belgian Golden Shoe for best player of the year in his first season. However, in March 2006, he was banned for three years – the first 4.5 months of the ban taking effect immediately and the rest suspended– depending on good behaviour, for spitting on an opposing player and assaulting a referee.

After the 2006–07 campaign, Conceição failed to win any silverware with Standard, finishing runner-up in 2005–06's league and losing the 2007 final of the Belgian Cup. He decided to move to Kuwait and Qadsia on an annual salary of €1.1 million but, quickly unsettled, left.

In January 2008, after failed deals in Portugal, Conceição agreed to join PAOK in Greece, signing an 18-month contract. His unlikely signing was largely attributed to club director of football Zisis Vryzas, and the presence of Portuguese manager Fernando Santos on the bench; though he initially struggled even to return to proper fitness levels, he was instantly given the number No. 7 shirt, once worn by legendary former player (and also chairman) Theodoros Zagorakis.

Conceição was promoted to team captain in 2008–09. Along with compatriot Vieirinha, he was a regular on the team's wings and gradually became a fan favourite for his leadership and his devotion to the club; at the beginning of the following campaign, however, he was regularly troubled by knee injuries for the most part of October, managing only a few appearances.

== International career ==
Conceição played 56 times with the Portugal national team and scored 12 goals, his debut being on 9 November 1996 in a 1–0 home win over Ukraine for the 1998 FIFA World Cup qualifiers. In his last international game he was on the losing end of a 0–3 friendly defeat at the hands of Spain, on 6 September 2003.

Early in his international career, Conceição was not known for his scoring prowess but, at UEFA Euro 2000, Portugal reached the semi-finals with a major contribution from him: in the third and final match of the group stage, against defending champions Germany in Rotterdam, he netted a hat-trick for all of the game's goals; the national side had guaranteed first place in the first two rounds, so it played mostly with substitutes, but he cemented his place in the starting XI for the rest of the tournament and subsequent call-ups.

In qualifying for the 2002 World Cup, Conceição scored four goals as Portugal finished top in a group that also featured the Republic of Ireland and the Netherlands (netting against both).

== Coaching career ==
=== Beginnings ===
On 13 October 2009, Conceição announced his decision to retire as a professional footballer, and to continue working at PAOK as technical director, accepting Vryzas' proposal for the seat left vacant when he assumed presidency early on. On 30 May 2010, a few weeks after Santos' resignation as manager, he left the Thessaloniki club and rejoined another former team, as part of Standard Liège's coaching staff led by Dominique D'Onofrio.

=== Olhanense ===
Conceição began his managerial career on 1 January 2012, replacing Daúto Faquirá at the helm of Olhanense in the Primeira Liga. His debut for the 10th-placed team was a 2–1 loss at Marítimo a week later, and they finished the season two positions higher.

Conceição was reported to have left the Algarve on 9 August 2012, following disputes with the board, but days later he appeared with president Isidoro Sousa to say that it was not the case. He resigned early in the new year and took legal action against the club for delayed wages by requesting their bankruptcy.

=== Académica ===
On 8 April 2013, Conceição was hired as manager of his hometown team Académica, less than 24 hours after the club dismissed Pedro Emanuel from the job. They stood at 13th place when he joined, and his main goal was to avoid relegation.

Conceição left at the end of the 2013–14 campaign, after leading the side to eighth place.

=== Braga ===
Conceição signed a two-year contract with Braga on 26 May 2014; the team had just finished the campaign one place below Académica with the same number of points, resulting in the first time in ten years that the club was out of European competitions. He led them to a fourth-place finish and the final of the domestic cup. After the semi-final victory at Rio Ave's ground, he made the 24-mile journey home from Vila do Conde on foot as part of a bet made with his players. The decisive match was lost to Sporting in a penalty shootout, despite leading 2–0 at half time.

Following this defeat, president António Salvador released an official statement that angered Conceição, resulting in a "violent discussion" between the two and leading to the latter's sacking.

=== Vitória Guimarães ===
On 22 September 2015, Conceição resurfaced with his fourth management position in the Portuguese top-flight, at Vitória de Guimarães. On 17 January 2016, he led the side to their first home win against Porto (1–0) in 14 years. He left at the end of the season by mutual consent, after a 10th place in the championship left them out of European competitions.

=== Nantes ===
Conceição was named manager of Ligue 1 club Nantes on 8 December 2016, replacing the dismissed René Girard at a side second from bottom. His debut five days later was a 3–1 home victory over Montpellier in the last 16 of the Coupe de la Ligue, followed with a 2–0 league win at Angers; his one season at the Stade de la Beaujoire resulted in a 7th-place finish.

In February 2017, Conceição was linked to the vacant managerial position at struggling Premier League title holders Leicester City, but Nantes chairman Waldemar Kita insisted he would see out his two-year contract. It was announced on 6 June that he had quit his position and accepted a proposal from Porto, citing personal reasons, including the possibility to live close to his family in Portugal.

=== Porto ===
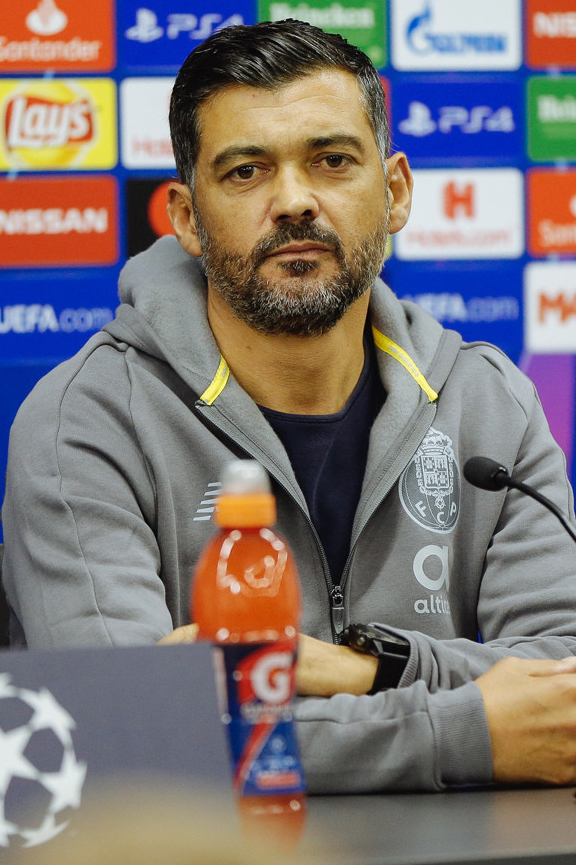
Conceição as manager of Porto in 2018

In June 2017, after cutting ties with Nantes, Conceição replaced former teammate Nuno Espírito Santo at the helm of former side Porto. He was officially presented on the 8th, signing a two-year deal, and won 4–0 at home to Estoril on his debut on 9 August. In his first season, he led the club to the national championship after a five-year wait, and his contract was extended by another year. They reached the quarter-finals in the subsequent Champions League, where they were ousted by eventual winners Liverpool.

On 1 March 2019, Conceição signed another deal until 2021. They regained their title in 2019–20 with two games to spare, after Benfica's form worsened at the end of the campaign. Two weeks later, his team beat that opponent in the cup final to secure the double. The team again reached the last-eight in the Champions League, being defeated 2–1 on aggregate by Chelsea.

Conceição renewed his contract for three more years on 4 June 2021, until June 2024. The following 16 April, a 7–0 home rout of Portimonense equalled Milan and Olympiacos' record of 58 league matches without losing. His third league title was sealed on 7 May, with a last-minute winner by Zaidu Sanusi at Benfica, and 15 days later a 3–1 defeat of Tondela decided the domestic cup final.

On 28 January 2023, Conceição won the first Taça da Liga in Porto's history with a 2–0 victory over Sporting in Leiria, his third such final. He managed his 323rd game for the team on 8 May, a 1–0 win at Arouca with which he surpassed José Maria Pedroto's club record. On 4 June, his team won the 2023 Taça de Portugal final 2–0 against Braga, making him the first manager to win that honour three times with Porto; his ten trophies made him the second most successful in Portuguese football, after Jorge Jesus' 12.

On 25 April 2024, with weeks of his contract remaining, Conceição signed a new deal to last until 2028; the news came before presidential elections at the club. A month later, he won the Portuguese Cup with a 2–1 defeat of Sporting, becoming the third manager to lift the trophy four times; unlike Otto Glória and Pedroto, he won all of his with the same side. Shortly after, however, he announced his decision to leave on 30 June.

=== AC Milan ===
On 30 December 2024, Conceição returned to the Italian top tier with AC Milan; he replaced his compatriot Paulo Fonseca, who had been dismissed the day before. On his debut four days later, he oversaw a 2–1 win over Juventus in the semi-finals of the Italian Supercup. In the final on 6 January, in which the Rossoneri started no national players for the first time in the history of the Derby della Madonnina, having done likewise in the previous match, his team came from behind 2–0 to beat Inter 3–2 and claim the title, and he became in the process their fastest manager to do so by breaking Vincenzo Montella's 2016 record of 18 games.

On 29 May 2025, following defeat to Bologna in the Italian Cup final and an eighth-place league finish, with the subsequent failure to qualify for any European competition, Conceição was fired.

=== Al-Ittihad ===
On 7 October 2025, Conceição left Europe and signed a two-year contract with Al-Ittihad in the Saudi Pro League; he took over from the sacked Laurent Blanc at the title holders. He achieved his first win 21 days later, beating Al-Nassr 2–1 in the round of 16 of the King's Cup.

== Style of play ==
Conceição was mainly known for his speed, strength and ability to cover the flank and get forward, also possessing good dribbling skills, crossing ability and a fairly accurate shot. A versatile and hard-working midfielder, he was usually deployed as a right winger, and was also capable of playing in a holding role.

== Style of management ==
During his tenure at Porto, Conceição developed a reputation for an attractive style of play based on keeping possession. He was also not afraid to make bold tactical decisions, including starting players who were more suitable to his system rather than being technically gifted.

Conceição often utilised a 4–3–2–1 formation, and his players usually embodied a fast and aggressive mentality. He occasionally deployed a 4–4–2 formation; Fabio Capello commented on this approach saying: 'As a coach he has done very, very well at Porto, demonstrating great tactical and attacking attention. His teams are solid and balanced, we saw it in the Champions League. He’s a coach capable of working with both important players and prospective players: he brings out the best in everyone. He is used to building and doing it with a winning mentality. He made this with the philosophy of Porto, where historically value is created by winning.'

== Personal life ==
Coimbra's municipal government named a local 2,500-seater stadium after him – the Estádio Municipal Sérgio Conceição. He fathered five sons: Sérgio, Rodrigo, Moisés, Francisco and José; the second and fourth played under him at Porto.

Conceição helped ten families who were struggling financially during the COVID-19 pandemic, with the intent of providing "a grocery store in every home". During an interview to RTP1 in December 2020, he stated that his hero was God and he was a devout Catholic.

== Career statistics ==
=== Club ===
Appearances and goals by club, season and competition
Club	Season	League			Cup		Europe		Other (Note: Includes Supercoppa Italiana, Supertaça Cândido de Oliveira and UEFA Super Cup.)		Total	
Club	Season	Division	Apps	Goals	Apps	Goals	Apps	Goals	Apps	Goals	Apps	Goals
Penafiel	1993–94	Segunda Divisão	30	1	1	0	—		—		31	1
Leça	1994–95	Segunda Divisão	24	3	2	1	—		—		26	4
Felgueiras	1995–96	Primeira Divisão	30	4	2	0	—		—		32	4
Porto	1996–97	Primeira Divisão	26	1	3	1	7	0	2	0	38	2
Porto	1997–98	Primeira Divisão	30	8	3	0	4	0	2	0	39	8
Porto	Total		56	9	6	1	11	0	4	0	77	10
Lazio	1998–99	Serie A	33	5	5	0	5	1	1	1	44	7
Lazio	1999–2000	Serie A	30	2	4	0	9	2	0	0	43	4
Lazio	Total		63	7	9	0	14	3	1	1	87	11
Parma	2000–01	Serie A	25	5	5	0	6	2	—		36	7
Inter Milan	2001–02	Serie A	23	1	1	0	8	0	—		32	1
Inter Milan	2002–03	Serie A	19	0	1	1	13	0	—		33	1
Inter Milan	Total		42	1	2	1	21	0	—		65	2
Lazio	2003–04	Serie A	7	0	2	0	7	0	—		16	0
Porto	2003–04	Primeira Liga	11	0	1	1	—		—		12	1
Standard Liège	2004–05	Belgian First Division	27	10	2	1	5	0	—		34	11
Standard Liège	2005–06	Belgian First Division	25	7	4	0	—		—		29	7
Standard Liège	2006–07	Belgian First Division	22	4	3	0	2	0	—		27	4
Standard Liège	Total		74	21	9	1	7	0	—		90	22
Qadsia	2007–08	Kuwait Premier League	7	0	—		—		—		7	0
PAOK	2007–08	Super League Greece	7	0	—		—		—		7	0
PAOK	2008–09	Super League Greece	28	5	3	1	—		—		31	6
PAOK	2009–10	Super League Greece	6	0	0	0	3	0	—		9	0
PAOK	Total		41	5	3	1	3	0	—		47	6
Career total			410	56	42	6	69	5	5	1	526	68

=== International ===
Appearances and goals by national team and year
National team	Year	Apps	Goals
Portugal	1996	1	0
Portugal	1997	7	1
Portugal	1998	3	0
Portugal	1999	9	1
Portugal	2000	12	5
Portugal	2001	6	2
Portugal	2002	11	3
Portugal	2003	7	0
Total		56	12

Scores and results list Portugal's goal tally first, score column indicates score after each Conceição goal.

List of international goals scored by Sérgio Conceição
No.	Date	Venue	Opponent	Score	Result	Competition
1	11 October 1997	Estádio da Luz (1954), Lisboa, Portugal	Northern Ireland	1–0	1–0	1998 World Cup qualification
2	26 March 1999	Estádio D. Afonso Henriques, Guimarães, Portugal	Azerbaijan	4–0	7–0	Euro 2000 qualifying
3	20 June 2000	Feijenoord Stadion, Rotterdam, Netherlands	Germany	1–0	3–0	UEFA Euro 2000
4	20 June 2000	Feijenoord Stadion, Rotterdam, Netherlands	Germany	2–0	3–0	UEFA Euro 2000
5	20 June 2000	Feijenoord Stadion, Rotterdam, Netherlands	Germany	3–0	3–0	UEFA Euro 2000
6	7 October 2000	Estádio da Luz (1954), Lisbon, Portugal	Republic of Ireland	1–0	1–1	2002 World Cup qualification
7	11 October 2000	De Kuip, Rotterdam, Netherlands	Netherlands	1–0	2–0	2002 World Cup qualification
8	1 September 2001	Camp d'Esports, Lleida, Spain	Andorra	6–1	7–1	2002 World Cup qualification
9	5 September 2001	Antonis Papadopoulos, Larnaca, Cyprus	Cyprus	3–1	3–1	2002 World Cup qualification
10	27 March 2002	Estádio do Bessa, Porto, Portugal	Finland	1–2	1–4	Friendly
11	17 April 2002	Estádio José Alvalade (1956), Lisbon, Portugal	Brazil	1–0	1–1	Friendly
12	16 October 2002	Ullevi, Gothenburg, Sweden	Sweden	1–2	3–2	Friendly

== Managerial statistics ==
As of match played 21 May 2026

Managerial record by team and tenure
Team	Nat	From	To	Record								Ref
Team	Nat	From	To	G	W	D	L	GF	GA	GD	Win %	Ref
Olhanense	(Portugal)	2 January 2012	7 January 2013	34	10	13	11	43	45	−2	29.41	
Académica	(Portugal)	8 April 2013	26 May 2014	41	12	14	15	34	45	−11	29.27	
Braga	(Portugal)	26 May 2014	30 June 2015	45	24	10	11	81	38	+43	53.33	
Vitória Guimarães	(Portugal)	23 September 2015	18 May 2016	31	8	10	13	43	52	−9	25.81	
Nantes	(France)	8 December 2016	6 June 2017	26	13	5	8	36	33	+3	50.00	
Porto	(Portugal)	8 June 2017	30 June 2024	379	274	53	52	812	307	+505	72.30	
Milan	(Italy)	30 December 2024	29 May 2025	31	16	5	10	50	36	+14	51.61	
Al-Ittihad	(Saudi Arabia)	7 October 2025	1 June 2026	41	21	8	12	75	53	+22	51.22	
Career Total				628	378	118	132	1,174	609	+565	60.19	—

== Honours ==
=== Player ===
Leça

- Segunda Liga: 1994–95

Porto

- Primeira Liga: 1996–97, 1997–98, 2003–04
- Taça de Portugal: 1997–98
- Supertaça Cândido de Oliveira: 1996

Lazio

- Serie A: 1999–2000
- Coppa Italia: 1999–2000, 2003–04
- Supercoppa Italiana: 1998
- UEFA Cup Winners' Cup: 1998–99
- UEFA Super Cup: 1999

Portugal

- UEFA European Championship third place: 2000
- UEFA European Under-18 Championship runner-up: 1992

Individual

- Belgian Golden Shoe: 2005
- La Dernière Heure Standard Liège All-Time XI: 2020

=== Manager ===
Porto

- Primeira Liga: 2017–18, 2019–20, 2021–22
- Taça de Portugal: 2019–20, 2021–22, 2022–23, 2023–24
- Taça da Liga: 2022–23
- Supertaça Cândido de Oliveira: 2018, 2020, 2022

AC Milan

- Supercoppa Italiana: 2024

Individual

- Primeira Liga Best Coach: 2017–18, 2019–20, 2021–22
- Primeira Liga Manager of the Month: October/November 2018, December 2018, February 2020 December 2020, December 2021, March 2022
