= Zalán Átrok =

Hungarian footballer (born 2005)

Personal information
- Full name: István Átrok
- Date of birth: 6 December 2005 (age 20)
- Place of birth: Kecskemét, Hungary
- Height: 1.84 m (6 ft 0 in)
- Positions: Midfielder; winger

Team information
- Current team: Zulte Waregem
- Number: 21

Youth career
- –2O17: Fradi
- 2O17–2018: Puskás Akadémia
- 2018–2020: Kecskemét
- 2020–2023: Honvéd

Senior career*
Years	Team	Apps	(Gls)
2022–2024	Kispest-Honvéd II	22	(6)
2023–2025	Kispest-Honvéd	17	(0)
2025	→ Kozármisleny (loan)	14	(1)
2025–2026	MTK Budapest	30	(6)
2026–	Zulte Waregem	10	(3)

International career^{‡}
2022	Hungary U18	4	(0)
2023	Hungary U19	1	(1)
2025–	Hungary U21	7	(0)
- * Club domestic league appearances and goals as of 30 October 2026 ‡ National team caps and goals as of 6 October 2026

István Átrok (born 6 December 2005) is a Hungarian professional footballer who plays as a midfielder or winger for Zulte Waregem.

== Early life ==
Átrok was born on 6 December 2005. Born in Hungary, he is a native of Jakabszállás, Hungary.

== Club career ==
As a youth player, Átrok joined the youth academy of Honvéd and was promoted to the club's senior team in 2023, where he made seventeen league appearances and scored zero goals and suffered relegation from the top flight to the second tier.

Subsequently, he was sent on loan to Kozármisleny in 2025. The same year, he signed for MTK. Ahead of the 2026–27 season, he signed for Belgian side Zulte Waregem after receiving interest from Italian outfits.

== International career ==
Átrok is a Hungary youth international and has represented the country internationally at under-18, under-19 and under-21 levels. Altogether, he made four appearances and scored zero goals while playing for the Hungary national under-18 football team.

On 23 August 2023, he debuted and scored his first goal for the Hungary national under-19 football team during a 2–3 home friendly loss to the Romania national under-19 football team. During the autumn of 2025, the spring of 2026 and the autumn of 2026, he played for the Hungary national under-21 football team for 2027 UEFA European Under-21 Championship qualification.
