= Matthieu Verschuère =

French footballer (born 1972)

Personal information
- Date of birth: 8 February 1972 (age 54)
- Place of birth: Beauvais, France
- Height: 1.68 m (5 ft 6 in)
- Position: Midfielder

Senior career*
Years	Team	Apps	(Gls)
1992–1997	AS Beauvais		
1997–2000	Châteauroux	81	(0)
2000–2001	Sedan	32	(1)
2001–2002	Gent	34	(0)
2002–2003	Sedan	14	(0)
2003–2005	Gent	54	(1)
2005–2008	Zulte Waregem	86	(1)
2008–2011	US Roye		
- * Club domestic league appearances and goals

Matthieu Verschuère (born 8 February 1972) is a French former professional footballer who played as a midfielder.

== Honours ==
Zulte Waregem

- Belgian Cup: 2005–06
