= Christophe Martin =

Belgian footballer

Personal information
- Date of birth: 21 February 1975 (age 51)
- Place of birth: Tournai, Belgium
- Height: 1.91 m (6 ft 3 in)
- Position: Goalkeeper

Senior career*
Years	Team	Apps	(Gls)
1982–1992	AS Obigies		
1992–1994	RC Tournai		
1994–1996	US Tournai		
1996–1997	RC Tournai		
1997–1998	RFC Ath		
1998–2000	RC Quevaucamps		
2000–2001	RAEC Mons	15	(0)
2001–2003	Willem II	8	(0)
2003–2008	Mouscron	19	(0)
2008–2016	Tournai	88	(0)
Total		130	(0)
- * Club domestic league appearances and goals

Christophe Martin (born 21 February 1975) is a Belgian former professional footballer who plays as a goalkeeper.

== Club career ==
He started Mouscron's first four league matches of the 2006–07 season, but was back on the bench after their 3–1 defeat to K.S.K. Beveren on 26 August 2006.

== Honours ==
With Mouscron:

- Belgian Cup runners-up (2005–06)
