= Paco Sanchez =

Belgian footballer

Personal information
- Full name: Francisco Sanchez d'Avolio
- Date of birth: 16 May 1986 (age 40)
- Place of birth: Baudour, Belgium
- Height: 1.81 m (5 ft 11 in)
- Position: Midfielder

Youth career
- 1992–1994: Furia Española
- 1994–1995: Anderlecht
- 1995–1999: Francs Borains
- 1999–2003: Standard Liège

Senior career*
Years	Team	Apps	(Gls)
2003–2008	R.E. Mouscron	114	(6)
2007–2008	→ Dender EH (loan)	13	(1)
2008–2010	Dender EH	27	(1)
2010–2012	F91 Dudelange	9	(0)
2014	Wiers		

International career
	Belgium U-19	19	(4)
- * Club domestic league appearances and goals

Francisco "Paco" Sanchez d'Avolio (born 16 May 1986 in Baudour) is a retired Belgian football player.

== Career ==
=== Club career ===
He began his career 1992 by CD Furia Espagnola Baudour, before 1994 scouted from R.S.C. Anderlecht, than joined to R. Francs Borains. 1995 signed a contract Standard Liège and moved 1999 to R.E. Mouscron, played there 8 years and moved on 31 January 2008 on loan to FCV Dender EH, in summer 2008 was sold from Dender.

== Privates ==
He also holds Spanish citizenship.
