= Francky Dury =

Belgian football manager

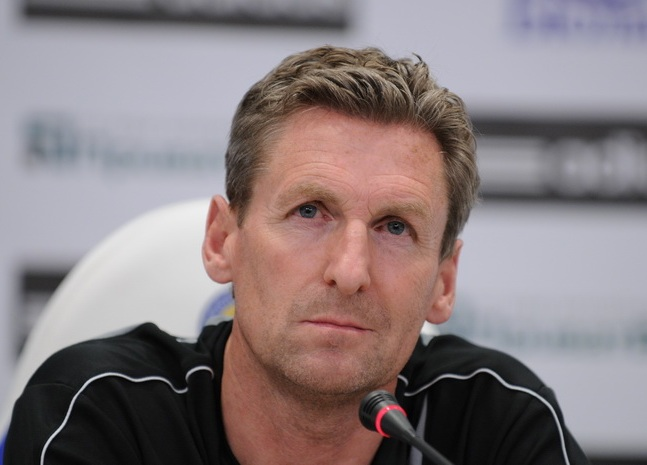
- Dury in 2010

Personal information
- Date of birth: 11 October 1957 (age 69)
- Place of birth: Roeselare, Belgium
- Position: Midfielder

Youth career
- 1969–1971: Hulste Sport

Senior career*
Years	Team	Apps	(Gls)
1971–1981	Hulste Sport	220	(6)
Total		220	(6)

Managerial career
- 1981–1983: KRC Harelbeke Provinciale Juniores
- 1983–1985: KSK Beveren-Leie
- 1985–1989: KSK Ronse
- 1989–1990: R.R.C. Tournaisien
- 1990–1993: Zultse VV
- 1993–1994: RCH Gent
- 1994–2001: Zultse VV
- 2001–2010: Zulte Waregem
- 2010–2011: Gent
- 2011: Belgium U21
- 2012–2021: Zulte Waregem
- * Club domestic league appearances and goals

Francky Dury (born 11 October 1957) is a Belgian football manager. He most recently managed Zulte Waregem, the team he coached for almost 20 years. Before that, he had already worked for their predecessor Zultse VV for 10 seasons.

== Amateur footballing career and early coaching career ==
Born in Roeselare, Dury began his career as an amateur footballer in the Belgian lower leagues, playing for Hulste Sport from 1971 to 1981.

He made his first coaching experiences at Harelbeke, where he was in charge of the second team, as well as at KSK Beveren-Leie, K.S.K. Ronse and R.R.C. Tournaisien.

== Professional coaching career ==
=== Zultse VV/Zulte-Waregem, RCH Gent ===
Except for a season-long stint at RCH Gent Dury coached Zultse VV from 1990 to 2010, with Zultse being merged into S.V. Zulte Waregem in 2001. Having helped his team to promotions from the first level of the Belgian provincial leagues (1991), the Belgian Fourth Division (1994 and 1999), the Belgian Third Division (2002) and the Belgian Second Division (2005) he won the second division championship with Zulte-Waregem in the 2004–05 season achieving promotion to the highest level in Belgian football, the Belgian Pro League.

In the club's first season in the highest division, Dury guided Zulte-Waregem to a sixth place in the league as well as to winning the 2005–06 Belgian Cup, earning qualification to the Europa League. Following these achievements, two personal honours were bestowed on him: he was voted coach of the year 2006 and West-Flemish personality of the year by the watchers of the regional television chains Focus and WTV in 2006. In 2007, he signed a professional contract as coach of the club while giving up his previously held job as a detective. In August 2009, he became the assistant of Frank Vercauteren, then-coach of the national Belgian team, while remaining the coach of Zulte-Waregem.

=== Gent ===
In June 2010, rumours were confirmed that Dury would have contract talks with K.A.A. Gent to become the club's new coach, which was confirmed on 10 June, the date on which the transfer became official. On 14 May 2011, the Belgian press reported that Dury's contract would be terminated after Gent's final match of the season, against Club Brugge. Having finished the regular season in third place, Gent had failed to win any of their first nine playoff matches (out of ten in total), meaning they could only finish in 5th or 6th place, with no chance of qualifying for a 2011–12 European competition.

=== Return to Zulte-Waregem ===
After half a year working for the Royal Belgian Football Association working first as national technical director and then as head coach of the Belgium U21, he returned to Zulte Waregem as head coach in the last week of 2011. In the 2012–2013 season, he finished second in the league with the club at the end of which he was again chosen as coach of the year.

== Honours ==
Zulte-Waregem

- Belgian Third Division: 2001–02
- Belgian Second Division: 2004–05
- Belgian First Division: runner-up 2012–13
- Belgian Cup: 2005–06, 2016–17; runner-up 2013–14

Individual

- Belgian Professional Manager of the Year: 2005–06, 2012–13
- Belgian Best Coach of the Year: 2013
- Guy Thys Award: 2014
- Raymond Goethals Award: 2016
- West-Flemish personality of the year: 2007
