= Tim Matthys =

Belgian football official and former player

Personal information
- Date of birth: 23 December 1983 (age 42)
- Place of birth: Ghent, Belgium
- Height: 1.80 m (5 ft 11 in)
- Position: Right winger

Team information
- Current team: Gent (scout)

Youth career
- 1989–1993: RC Strijpen
- 1993–2004: KSV Zottegem

Senior career*
Years	Team	Apps	(Gls)
2004–2005	Gent	25	(5)
2005–2008	Zulte-Waregem	90	(23)
2008	Zulte-Waregem	14	(3)
2009	→ Panthrakikos (loan)	15	(1)
2009–2010	→ Lierse (loan)	33	(3)
2010–2014	Mons	117	(19)
2014–2019	Mechelen	127	(11)
- * Club domestic league appearances and goals

Tim Matthys (born 23 December 1983) is a Belgian football official and a former player. As of 2022, he works as technical director of K.V. Mechelen.

== Career ==
While playing for his Zulte-Waregem, Matthys scored five goals in the UEFA Cup in only three matches. He scored one in the first round against Lokomotiv Moscow and scored a hat-trick against Austria Wien. He is the best scorer of his team in this competition. He also scored in the Belgian Cup final, which allowed Zulte-Waregem entry into the UEFA Cup.

Matthys also played for Panthrakikos in the Super League Greece.

Matthys later played for Mons in the Belgian Pro League (D1). He arrived at Mons in August 2010 and helped the team in their promotion quest by winning the Tour Final of the Belgian second division (Exqi League). At the end of his first season, he was elected "Man of the Season" by his club.

== Post-playing career ==
Retiring in the summer 2019, 35-year old Matthys was hired as chief scout for KV Mechelen. On 1 October 2019, he returned to K.A.A. Gent and was appointed scout for the first team and he would also take coordinating tasks for the U18 and U21 teams of the club.

== Honours ==
Zulte Waregem

- Belgian Cup: 2005–06

Mechelen

- Belgian Cup: 2018–19
