= Tony Sergeant =

Belgian footballer

Personal information
- Full name: Tony Sergeant
- Date of birth: 6 June 1977 (age 49)
- Place of birth: Deinze, Belgium
- Height: 1.83 m (6 ft 0 in)
- Position: Midfielder

Youth career
- Zeveren Sport
- Deinze
- Cercle Brugge

Senior career*
Years	Team	Apps	(Gls)
2000–2004	Royal Antwerp FC	105	(18)
2005–2007	SV Zulte Waregem	63	(17)
2007–2008	AS Bari	5	(0)
2008	→ Cercle Brugge	13	(4)
2008–2012	Cercle Brugge	67	(10)
- * Club domestic league appearances and goals

Tony Sergeant (born 6 June 1977) is a retired football midfielder who last played for Cercle Brugge in the Belgian Pro League.

Sergeant started his career at Antwerp, before moving to Zulte-Waregem in the summer of 2004. During the 2005-06 season, he scored 10 goals, before moving to Italian Serie B team AS Bari in 2007. This move was not a big success, and as a result, Sergeant went back to his home country only six months later. Cercle Brugge made a loan deal with Bari and thereafter completed a full transfer before Sergeant retired in 2012.

== Honours ==
Zulte Waregem

- Belgian Cup: 2005–06
