= Patrice Noukeu =

Cameroonian footballer (born 1982)

Personal information
- Date of birth: 22 December 1982 (age 43)
- Place of birth: Douala, Cameroon
- Height: 1.87 m (6 ft 2 in)
- Position: Midfielder

Team information
- Current team: Canon Yaoundé (manager)

Senior career*
Years	Team	Apps	(Gls)
2002–2004	Geel	65	(7)
2004–2006	Mouscron	43	(3)
2006–2007	Gent	18	(0)
2007–2008	Skoda Xanthi	2	(0)
2008–2009	KV Mechelen	5	(0)
2009	Gent	2	(0)
2009–2010	→ K.V.S.K. United (loan)	43	(3)
2010–2011	Kəpəz	8	(0)
2011–2013	Deinze	40	(5)
2013–2015	Izegem	4	(0)

Managerial career
- 2025-: Canon Yaoundé
- * Club domestic league appearances and goals

Patrice Noukeu (born 22 November 1982) is a Cameroonian footballer who currently manages Cameroonian top division side Canon Yaoundé. He spent the majority of his professional career playing for Belgian teams, with spells in Greece and Azerbaijan for Skoda Xanthi and Kəpəz.

== Managerial career ==
On 12 May 2025, Noukeu was appointed manager of Canon Yaoundé, a team in Cameroon's top division, MTE Elite One. This is his first management job since retiring from his playing career.
