= Carlinhos (footballer, born 1980) =

Brazilian footballer

Personal information
- Full name: Carlos Alberto de Almeida Junior
- Date of birth: June 17, 1980 (age 46)
- Place of birth: Rio de Janeiro, Brazil
- Height: 1.85 m (6 ft 1 in)
- Position: Midfielder

Team information
- Current team: Bangu

Senior career*
Years	Team	Apps	(Gls)
2000–2001	Flamengo	48	(2)
2002	Brasiliense	31	(2)
2003–2004	Vasco da Gama	21	(0)
2004–2006	Standard Liège	17	(0)
2006–2008	FC Aarau	40	(2)
- ?
2011	Bangu		
- * Club domestic league appearances and goals as of January 15, 2009

Carlos Alberto de Almeida Jr. known as Carlinhos (born 17 June 1980), is a Brazilian footballer who plays for Bangu.

== Career ==
Carlinhos started his career at Flamengo. In 2005, he left for Belgian First Division club Standard de Liège.

After played once in 2008–09 season, Carlinhos was released by Swiss club FC Aarau.

In August 2011 he returned to Brazil for Bangu.
