= KM Torhout =

Belgian football club

- Full name: Koninklijke Maatschappij Torhout
- Founded: 1992; 34 years ago
- Ground: De Velodroom, Torhout
- Capacity: 2,000
- Chairman: Dick D'Hoore
- Manager: Vacant
- League: Belgian Division 2 VV
- 2025–26: Belgian Division 2 VV A, 6th of 16
- Website: kmtorhout.be
Home colours	Away colours

Koninklijke Maatschappij Torhout, commonly known as KM Torhout, is a Belgian football club based in Torhout, West Flanders. The club plays its home matches at De Velodroom and competes in the Belgian Division 2, the fourth tier of Belgian football. Formed in 1992 by the merger of the town's two senior clubs, KVK Torhout and KSK Torhout, it plays under matricule 822 of the Royal Belgian Football Association.

== History ==
=== Predecessors (1920–1992) ===
The first football club in Torhout was Football Club Thourout, founded on 24 February 1919 and admitted to the Royal Belgian Football Association (KBVB) in 1920. Later renamed Koninklijke Football Club Torhout and then Koninklijke Voetbalklub Torhout (KVK Torhout) in 1973, it played under matricule 110. The club's original ground was the town's old Paardenmarkt, near the present site of the municipal swimming pool; in 1951, after a working cycling velodrome on the site had been dismantled by occupying German forces during the World War II for use as a munitions depot, KVK Torhout moved to the rebuilt ground, which retained the name De Velodroom.

A second Torhout club, Sportkring Torhout, was founded in 1926 following a dispute between two leather-merchant vice-presidents of FC Thourout over the supply of football boots; it was assigned matricule 822 and granted the royal title in 1952, becoming Koninklijke Sportkring Torhout (KSK Torhout). KSK Torhout played first at grounds on Roeselaarse Kalsijde, then Kortemarkse Kalsijde, then Brildam, before moving in 1963 to the municipal sports stadium on the eastern side of town.

KVK Torhout was the first Torhout club to reach national football, entering the Belgian Fourth Division in 1969 and playing fifteen seasons at that level over the following two decades. KSK Torhout joined it in the Fourth Division in 1987–88. In 1991–92 both clubs finished in relegation positions and dropped together to First Provincial; the two boards agreed to merge.

=== Merger and KM Torhout (1992–present) ===
The merger took effect in summer 1992 under the name Torhout 1992 Koninklijke Maatschappij (Torhout 1992 KM), with the founding KVK chairman Charles Hollevoet as president and KSK's Rudi Vanneste as secretary. The new club retained KSK's matricule 822, took the green-white-and-black colours of both predecessors, and continued to play at De Velodroom; matricule 110 was struck off.

The merged club won First Provincial in 1995 to return to Fourth Division, and took the Fourth Division title in 1997 to reach the Third Division for the first time in Torhout's history. Torhout 1992 KM remained in the third tier for most of the following decade, dropping back to the Fourth Division for occasional single seasons. In 2001, an unconnected new club was founded in the town under the revived name SK Torhout, joining the KBVB under matricule 9388.

In June 2020, following consultations between the club's board, management and youth section, the name was shortened from Torhout 1992 KM to KM Torhout, the form by which it had long been known colloquially; the change was approved by the KBVB and by the Royal Court, which authorised the continued use of the royal title. The club has since competed in the Belgian Division 2, the fourth tier of Belgian football following the 2016 reorganisation of the national pyramid.

== Stadium ==
KM Torhout plays at De Velodroom in Torhout, named for the cycling track that occupied the site from the early twentieth century until it was dismantled by occupying German forces during the World War II. The ground has a capacity of 2,000. The clubhouse is named "Club 110" in commemoration of KVK Torhout's retired matricule.

== Honours ==
- Belgian Fourth Division
  - Champions: 1996–97
- First Provincial West Flanders
  - Champions: 1994–95
