= 2005–06 Belgian Cup =

Tournament details
- Country: Belgium

Final positions
- Champions: Zulte-Waregem
- Runners-up: Mouscron

The Belgian Cup 2005-06 was the 51st staging of the Belgian Cup which is the main knock-out football competition in Belgium. It was won by S.V. Zulte-Waregem. After the first 5 rounds teams from the Belgian First Division entered the competition on November 10, 2005. The sixth round ended on December 6, 2005 and saw the surprise defeat of Anderlecht to second division side Geel after penalty shootout. The seventh round was held on December 21, 2005. From the quarter-finals on matches were played in two legs. The first team to host is indicated first in the following chart. The final game was played at the King Baudouin Stadium on May 13, 2006.

== Starting Rounds ==
Legend

- D2 = second division
- D3 = third division
- P = promotion
- PR1 = provincial, First division
- PR2 = provincial, Second division
- PR3 = provincial, Third division
- PR4 = provincial, Fourth division

=== Round 1 ===
==== Group 1 ====
Tie no	Date and hour	Home team	Score	Away team
1	2005-07-31 18:00	ROC Meix-devant-Virton (PR2)	0–1	RSC Athusien (PR1)
2	2005-07-30 19:00	Marloie Sport (PR2)	5–0	FC Surice (PR3)
3	2005-07-31 18:00	Alliance FCOppagne-Wéris (PR1)	1–2	RES Philippeville (PR2)
4	2005-07-31 16:00	RES Couvin-Mariembourg (P)	2–2 (p 6–5)	Jeunesse Arlonaise (PR1)
5	2005-07-31 16:00	Spa FC (P)	3–1	ES de la Lesse Redu (PR3)
6	2005-07-30 20:00	CS Onhaye (PR1)	4–3	RJ Rochefortoise FC (PR1)
7	2005-07-30 20:00	RUS Melreux (PR2)	1–3	RRC Hamoir (P)
8	2005-07-30 20:00	FC Le Lorrain Arlon (P)	0–1	RCS Libramontois (PR1)
9	2005-07-31 16:00	RRC Mormont (PR1)	3–7	FC Bleid (P)
10	2005-07-31 16:00	US Givry (PR1)	3–1	Aywaille FC (PR1)
11	2005-07-31 16:00	RUS Andenne-Seilles (P)	3–1	ES Jamoigne (PR1)
12	2005-07-30 20:00	Entente Bertrigeoise (P)	2–2 (p 4–5)	RUS Bercheux (PR1)

==== Group 2 ====
Tie no	Date and hour	Home team	Score	Away team
13	2005-07-31 16:00	Knokke FC (PR1)	1–0	AC Estaimbourg (PR1)
14	2005-07-31 16:00	RRC Péruwelz (P)	5–0	VV Eendracht Brugge (PR3)
15	2005-07-31 16:00	HO Oostende (PR1)	3–1	Jong Male VV (PR2)
16	2005-07-31 16:00	Club Roeselare (PR1)	3–0	KEG Gistel (P)
17	2005-07-31 16:00	SK Oostnieuwkerke (P)	0–2	KWS Club Lauwe (P)
18	2005-07-30 19:00	SC Wielsbeke (PR1)	1–0	KSK Steenbrugge (PR2)
19	2005-07-31 19:30	VG Oostende (P)	4–1	KSV Diksmuide (P)
20	2005-07-31 16:00	Sint-Eloois-Winkel Sport (P)	12–1	Dottignies Sport (PR3)
21	2005-07-31 16:00	KSV Rumbeke (P)	0–2	R.F.C. Tournai (D3)
22	2005-07-30 19:00	SK Eernegem (PR1)	1–0	VCK Zwevegem Sport (PR1)

==== Group 3 ====
Tie no	Date and hour	Home team	Score	Away team
23	2005-07-31 16:00	RFC Natoye (PR3)	2–3	Arquet FC (PR1)
24	2005-07-31 16:00	FC Flénu (PR3)	1–1 (p 4–5)	ASE De Chastre (PR3)
25	2005-07-31 16:00	Entente Sportive Fernelmont (PR1)	1–1 (p 5–3)	RSP Bosquetia Frameries (PR1)
26	2005-07-31 16:00	RACS Couillet (D3)	6–1	RRFC Gozeen (PR2)
27	2005-07-31 16:00	URS Du Centre (P)	3–0	Alliance FC Cuesmes (PR2)
28	2005-07-31 16:00	RFC Farciennes (PR2)	2–0	RAC Leuze-Longchamps (PR2)
29	2005-07-30 20:00	RFC Bioul 81 (PR1)	4–2	CAPS Namur (PR3)
30	2005-07-31 16:00	RSC Wasmes (PR3)	3–1	JS Thudinienne (PR3)
31	2005-07-31 16:00	RES Acrenoise (PR1)	6–0	RU Wallonne Ciney (P)
32	2005-07-31 16:00	JS Taminoise (PR1)	2–0	Gosselies Sports (PR2)
33	2005-07-31 16:00	AS Ghlinoise (PR3)	0–3	RFC Spy (P)
34	2005-07-31 16:00	Soignies Sports (PR1)	0–0 (p 5–6)	RFC Meux (PR1)

==== Group 4 ====
Tie no	Date and hour	Home team	Score	Away team
35	2005-07-31 16:00	RFC Hannutois (P)	1–1 (p 2–4)	Runkst VV (PR2)
36	2005-07-31 19:00	Spouwen-Mopertingen (P)	1–3	KHIH Hoepertingen (PR2)
37	2005-07-31 18:00	Oreye Union (PR1)	1–3	Vlijtingen VV (PR1)
38	2005-07-31 16:00	FC Hedera Millen (P)	1–0	FC Soumagne (PR3)
39	2005-07-31 16:00	RCSJ de Grivegnée (PR1)	8–0	FC Lanaye (PR4)
40	2005-07-30 18:30	RAF Franchimontois (PR3)	1–4	Entente Racing Club Amay (PR1)
41	2005-07-31 16:00	R.F.C. de Liège (P)	1–0	Herk-De-Stad FC (PR1)
42	2005-07-31 16:00	FC Jehanster (PR3)	1–4	R.C.S. Verviétois (D3)
43	2005-07-31 16:00	Herve FC (PR1)	0–1	R.R.F.C. Montegnée (D3)
44	2005-07-31 16:00	RFC Huy (P)	2–1	EFC Schoonbeek (PR2)
45	2005-07-31 16:00	AS Houtain (PR3)	2–0	Alliance Mélen-Micheroux (PR1)
46	2005-07-31 16:00	FC Loncin (PR1)	0–3	RJS Bas-Oha (P)

==== Group 5 ====
Tie no	Date and hour	Home team	Score	Away team
47	2005-07-31 16:00	VC Osta Meerbeke (PR1)	4–6	KFC Eeklo (PR1)
48	2005-07-31 16:00	KFC Sporting Sintt-Gillis-Waas (PR1)	0–0 (p 5–4)	KSK De Jeugd Lovendegem (P)
49	2005-07-31 16:00	K.R.C. Gent-Zeehaven (P)	2–0	KVC Deerlijk Sport (PR2)
50	2005-07-31 16:00	VK Adegem (PR2)	1–3	KSK Lebbeke (PR1)
51	2005-07-31 16:00	VV Sparta Ursel (PR1)	1–3	WIK Eine (P)
52	2005-07-31 16:00	KSV Sottegem (P)	1–1 (p 5–6)	RC Wetteren-Kwatrecht (PR2)
53	2005-07-30 19:30	KVV Eendracht Aalter (P)	1–1 (p 5–4)	SK Oudegem (PR2)
54	2005-07-30 19:30	Verbroedering Meldert (P)	9–0	Zeveren Sportief (PR3)
55	2005-07-31 16:00	SK Verbroedering Oostakker (PR2)	0–3	SK Lebeke-Aalst (P)
56	2005-07-31 16:00	VV Straatje Stekene (PR3)	1–3	Eendracht Opstal (P)
57	2005-07-31 16:00	KSV Oudenaarde (P)	1–0	KSV Temse (P)
58	2005-07-31 16:00	Rapide Club Lebbeke (P)	5–0	K.F.C. Eendracht Zele (PR1)

==== Group 6 ====
Tie no	Date and hour	Home team	Score	Away team
59	2005-07-31 16:00	KAC Olen (P)	1–1 (p 5–3)	SK Meeuwen (PR1)
60	2005-07-31 16:00	FC Verbroedering Meerhout (P)	1–1 (p 9–10)	Eisden Sportief (PR3)
61	2005-07-30 19:00	KESK Leopoldsburg (D3)	4–1	KVV Rauw Sport Mol (PR3)
62	2005-07-30 20:00	KTH Diest (PR1)	1–1 (p 5–3)	Esperanza Neerpelt (PR1)
63	2005-07-30 19:30	KVC Rosselaar Hulsen Sportief (PR2)	2–1	Berkenbos VV Heusden (P)
64	2005-07-31 16:00	KSK Bree (P)	2–2 (p 5–3)	KVK Beringen (PR1)
65	2005-07-30 20:00	KVV Thes Sport Tessenderlo (P)	2–3	KVV Verbroedering Maasmechelen (PR1)
66	2005-07-31 16:00	FC Melosport Zonhoven (PR2)	0–3	Turkse Rangers Waterschei (PR1)
67	2005-07-30 18:00	KVV Weerstand Koersel (PR1)	1–4	K.S.K. Heist (P)
68	2005-07-31 16:00	KVV Lichtaart Sport (P)	0–2	KFC Racing Mol-Wezel (P)

==== Group 7 ====
Tie no	Date and hour	Home team	Score	Away team
69	2005-07-31 16:00	K. Rupel Boom F.C. (D3)	6–0	KFC Putte (PR3)
70	2005-07-30 20:00	Kontich FC (P)	7–0	KSK Wavria (PR2)
71	2005-07-30 16:00	KFC Sint-Lenaarts (PR1)	3–3 (p 3–4)	KVC Delta Londerzeel (PR2)
72	2005-07-31 16:00	KFC Lentezon Beerse (PR2)	1–4	Berchem Sport 2004 (P)
73	2005-07-30 19:00	KFCO Wilrijk (P)	2–0	Nieuwmoer FC (PR1)
74	2005-07-31 16:00	Free round: KFC Itegem (PR2)		
75	2005-07-31 16:00	KFC Zwarte Leeuw (P)	5–0	Zandvliet Sport (PR2)
76	2005-07-31 16:00	KSC Mechelen (PR3)	0–5	KVC Willebroek-Meerhof (D3)
77	2005-07-30 19:00	KFC Schoten SK (P)	1–1 (p 9–10)	K. Londerzeel S.K. (P)
78	2005-07-31 16:00	Hoogstraten VV (P)	6–0	KSC Maccabi-Voetbal Antwerp (PR3)

==== Group 8 ====
Tie no	Date and hour	Home team	Score	Away team
79	2005-07-30 19:00	SK Beersel-Drogenbos (PR1)	0–5	KVK Ninove (PR1)
80	2005-07-30 20:00	R. Jet Wavre (PR1)	0–2	Léopold Uccle FC (P)
81	2005-07-31 16:00	Kampenhout SK (P)	3–1	RCS Ohain (PR3)
82	2005-07-31 16:00	KVO Aarschot (P)	0–4	RCS Brainois (PR1)
83	2005-07-30 19:00	KFC Avenir Lembeek (PR3)	0–4	RSD Jette (PR1)
84	2005-07-31 16:00	RUS Albert Schaerbeek (PR2)	1–2	KSC Grimbergen (P)
85	2005-07-31 16:00	Racing Butsel (PR2)	0–2	Vilvoorde FC (PR1)
86	2005-07-31 16:00	Olympia SC Wijgmaal (PR1)	0–0 (p 8–7)	K.F.C. Rhodienne-Verrewinkel (P)
87	2005-07-31 16:00	KFC Eppegem (PR3)	1–1 (p 5–4)	Dilbeek Sport (P)
88	2005-07-31 16:00	Tempo Overijse (PR1)	1–2	Tienen United (PR2)

=== Round 2 ===
==== Group 1 ====
Tie no	Date and hour	Home team	Score	Away team
89	2005-08-07 16:00	RUS Bercheux (PR1)	3–3 (p 4–3)	RES Couvin-Mariembourg (P)
90	2005-08-06 20:00	CS Onhaye (PR1)	2–3	RRC Hamoir (P)
91	2005-08-07 16:00	FC Bleid (P)	4–0	RUS Andenne-Seilles (P)
92	2005-08-06 18:00	Spa FC (P)	2–0	RCS Libramontois (PR1)
93	2005-08-07 16:00	Marloie Sport (PR2)	1–2	US Givry (PR1)
94	2005-08-07 16:00	RSC Athusien (PR1)	0–3	RES Philippeville (PR2)

==== Group 2 ====
Tie no	Date and hour	Home team	Score	Away team
95	2005-08-07 16:00	KWS Club Lauwe (P)	4–1	SC Wielsbeke (PR1)
96	2005-08-07 16:00	Club Roeselare (PR1)	0–3	VG Oostende (P)
97	2005-08-07 16:00	SK Eernegem (PR1)	1–3	Sint-Eloois-Winkel Sport (P)
98	2005-08-07 16:00	Knokke FC (PR1)	1–4	RRC Péruwelz (P)
99	2005-08-07 16:00	R.F.C. Tournai (D3)	1–0	HO Oostende (PR1)

==== Group 3 ====
Tie no	Date and hour	Home team	Score	Away team
100	2005-08-06 19:00	RACS Couillet (D3)	2–2 (p 1–3)	RES Acrenoise (PR1)
101	2005-08-07 16:00	ASE De Chastre (PR3)	0–4	URS Du Centre (P)
102	2005-08-07 16:00	RSC Wasmes (PR3)	2–2 (p 4–5)	JS Taminoise (PR1)
103	2005-08-07 16:00	Entente Sportive Fernelmont (PR1)	0–0 (p 3–4)	RFC Bioul 81 (PR1)
104	2005-08-07 16:00	Arquet FC (PR1)	2–2 (p 4–5)	RFC Farciennes (PR2)
105	2005-08-07 18:30	RFC Meux (PR1)	0–1	RFC Spy (P)

==== Group 4 ====
Tie no	Date and hour	Home team	Score	Away team
106	2005-08-06 19:30	RFC Huy (P)	2–1	RJS Bas-Oha (P)
107	2005-08-07 16:00	FC Hedera Millen (P)	0–3	R.F.C. de Liège (P)
108	2005-08-07 16:00	KHIH Hoepertingen (PR2)	1–2	R.C.S. Verviétois (D3)
109	2005-08-07 16:00	Vlijtingen VV (PR1)	1–2	RCSJ de Grivegnée (PR1)
110	2005-08-07 16:00	Runkst VV (PR2)	2–1	Entente Racing Club Amay (PR1)
111	2005-08-07 16:00	AS Houtain (PR3)	0–4	R.R.F.C. Montegnée (D3)

==== Group 5 ====
Tie no	Date and hour	Home team	Score	Away team
112	2005-08-07 18:00	SK Lebeke-Aalst (P)	1–3	KVV Eendracht Aalter (P)
113	2005-08-07 16:00	KSK Lebbeke (PR1)	2–0	RC Wetteren-Kwatrecht (PR2)
114	2005-08-07 16:00	WIK Eine (P)	1–3	K.R.C. Gent-Zeehaven (P)
115	2005-08-07 16:00	KFC Sporting Sint-Gillis-Waas (PR1)	4–0	KFC Eeklo (PR1)
116	2005-08-07 16:00	Eendracht Opstal (P)	3–0	Rapide Club Lebbeke (P)
117	2005-08-06 19:30	Verbroedering Meldert (P)	0–2	K.S.V. Oudenaarde (P)

==== Group 6 ====
Tie no	Date and hour	Home team	Score	Away team
118	2005-08-07 16:00	K.S.K. Heist (P)	2–0	KSK Bree (P)
119	2005-08-07 16:00	K.Eisden Sportief (PR3)	1–3	KVV Thes Sport Tessenderlo (P)
120	2005-08-07 16:00	Turkse Rangers Waterschei (PR1)	1–2	KVC Rosselaar Hulsen Sportief (PR2)
121	2005-08-06 18:30	KESK Leopoldsburg (D3)	1–1 (p 3–5)	KAC Olen (PR3)
122	2005-08-06 20:00	KTH Diest (PR1)	3–3 (p 2–4)	KFC Racing Mol-Wezel (P)

==== Group 7 ====
Tie no	Date and hour	Home team	Score	Away team
123	2005-08-06 20:00	Kontich FC (P)	6–3	KVC Willebroek-Meerhof (D3)
124	2005-08-07 16:00	Berchem Sport 2004 (P)	2–0	K. Rupel Boom F.C. (D3)
125	2005-08-07 16:00	KVC Delta Londerzeel (PR2)	0–6	KFC Zwarte Leeuw (P)
126	2005-08-07 16:00	KFC Itegem (PR2)	0–3	Hoogstraten VV (P)
127	2005-08-07 16:00	K. Londerzeel S.K. (P)	1–1 (p 13–12)	KFCO Wilrijk (P)

==== Group 8 ====
Tie no	Date and hour	Home team	Score	Away team
128	2005-08-07 16:00	KVK Ninove (PR1)	0–2	Léopold Uccle FC (P)
129	2005-08-07 16:00	Vilvoorde FC (PR1)	0–5	RCS Brainois (PR1)
130	2005-08-07 16:00	Tienen United (PR2)	0–0 (p 4–2)	RSD Jette (PR1)
131	2005-08-07 16:00	Kampenhout SK (P)	1–0	KSC Grimbergen (P)
132	2005-08-07 16:00	KFC Eppegem (PR1)	2–3	Olympia SC Wijgmaal (PR3)

=== Round 3 ===
Tie no	Date and hour	Home team	Score	Away team
133	2005-08-13 20:00	KVSK United Overpelt-Lommel (D2)	3–1	KFC Kontich (P)
134	2005-08-14 16:00	FCN Sint-Niklaas (D3)	2–1	Berchem Sport 2004 (P)
135	2005-08-14 16:00	RES Philippeville (PR3)	0–9	White Star Woluwe F.C. (D3)
136	2005-08-13 19:30	VG Oostende (P)	3–1	KSV Bornem (D3)
137	2005-08-14 16:00	Sint-Eloois-Winkel Sport (P)	2–1	R. Cappellen F.C. (D3)
138	2005-08-13 20:00	K.V. Turnhout (D3)	2–2 (p 4–3)	KWS Club Lauwe (P)
139	2005-08-14 16:00	U.R.S. du Centre (P)	4–0	Eendracht Opstal (P)
140	2005-08-14 15:00	K.S.V. Oudenaarde (P)	0–0 (p 10–9)	RRC Péruwelz (P)
141	2005-08-14 16:00	K.R.C. Gent-Zeehaven (P)	4–1	KVV Thes Sport Tessenderlo (P)
142	2005-08-13 20:00	R.O.C. de Charleroi-Marchienne (D3)	4–0	Runkst VV (PR2)
143	2005-08-15 16:00	K.S.K. Heist (P)	1–0	KSK Lebbeke (PR1)
144	2005-08-14 16:00	R.F.C. Tournai (D3)	2–0	R.R.F.C. Montegnée (D3)
145	2005-08-13 18:00	RFC Farciennes (PR2)	2–4	KFC Racing Mol-Wezel (P)
146	2005-08-14 16:00	RFC Spy (P)	1–3	KFC Evergem-Center (P)
147	2005-08-13 18:00	KV Mechelen (D2)	2–1	KVV Eendracht Aalter (P)
148	2005-08-13 19:30	R.C.S. Verviétois (D3)	2–2 (p 4–5)	K. Standaard Wetteren (D3)
149	2005-08-14 16:00	Francs Borains (D3)	1–1 (p 3–2)	JS Taminoise (PR1)
150	2005-08-13 16:00	FCV Dender EH (D3)	4–0	RRC Hamoir (P)
151	2005-08-13 18:00	Wallonia Walhain CG (D3)	1–1 (p 3–4)	Spa FC (P)
152	2005-08-14 16:00	Léopold Uccle FC (P)	3–1	SWI Harelbeke (D3)
153	2005-08-14 16:00	FC Bleid (P)	0–3	Sportclub Tongeren (D3)
154	2005-08-14 17:00	Torhout 1992 KM (D3)	1–0	RES Acrenoise (PR1)
155	2005-08-14 19:00	Tienen United (PR2)	2–0	UR Namur (D3)
156	2005-08-14 16:00	RUS Bercheux (PR1)	0–4	Oud-Heverlee Leuven (D2)
157	2005-08-14 16:00	KFC Sporting Sint-Gillis-Waas (PR1)	1–1 (p 12–11)	KSK Kermt-Hasselt (D3)
158	2005-08-13 20:00	Hoogstraten VV (P)	0–0 (p 4–5)	Diegem Sport (D3)
159	2005-08-14 16:00	K. Londerzeel S.K. (P)	4–4 (p 3–4)	Excelsior Veldwezelt (P)
160	2005-08-14 16:00	KVC Rosselaar Hulsen Sportief (PR2)	0–4	RFC Union La Calamine (D3)
161	2005-08-14 16:00	RCS Brainois (PR1)	0–0 (p 3–1)	KSK Maldegem (D3)
162	2005-08-14 16:00	K.V.K. Tienen (D3)	1–3	KAC Olen (P)
163	2005-08-15 16:00	K. Racing Waregem (D3)	2–2 (p 4–2)	R.F.C. de Liège (P)
164	2005-08-14 16:00	RFC Huy (P)	1–3	Sprimont Comblain Sport (D3)
165	2005-08-14 16:00	K. Lyra TSV (P)	0–2	KFC Zwarte Leeuw (P)
166	2005-08-14 16:00	RFC Bioul 81 (PR1)	0–5	Seraing RUL (P)
167	2005-08-13 18:30	Kampenhout SK (P)	1–3	K.R.C. Mechelen (D3)
168	2005-08-14 16:00	Free round: Olympia SC. Wijgmaal (PR1)		
169	2005-08-13 19:30	Bocholter VV (D3)	5–1	RCSJ de Grivegnée (PR1)
170	2005-08-14 16:00	KSK Wevelgem City (P)	4–1	US Givry (PR1)

=== Round 4 ===
Tie no	Date and hour	Home team	Score	Away team
171	2005-08-21 16:00	Olympia SC Wijgmaal (PR1)	0–3	K.F.C. Dessel Sport (D2)
172	2005-08-21 16:00	KFC Racing Mol-Wezel (P)	1–5	Oud-Heverlee Leuven (D2)
173	2005-08-21 16:00	Seraing RUL (P)	0–3	Excelsior Veldwezelt (P)
174	2005-08-21 16:00	KFC Zwarte Leeuw (P)	3–1	KFC Sporting Sint-Gillis-Waas (PR1)
175	2005-08-21 16:00	R.O.C. de Charleroi-Marchienne (D3)	4–2	K. Beringen-Heusden-Zolder (D2)
176	2005-08-21 16:00	K.F.C. Vigor Wuitens Hamme (D2)	1–0	Diegem Sport (D3)
177	2005-08-20 20:00	KV Mechelen (D2)	2–1	Sportclub Tongeren (D3)
178	2005-08-21 16:00	R.A.E.C. Mons (D2)	4–0	RCS Brainois (PR1)
179	2005-08-20 16:00	RFC Union La Calamine (D3)	1–1 (p 4–3)	V.C. Eendracht Aalst 2002 (D3)
180	2005-08-21 16:00	KFC Evergem-Center (P)	0–4	K. Standaard Wetteren (D3)
181	2005-08-21 16:00	K.M.S.K. Deinze (D2)	4–2	Bocholter VV (D3)
182	2005-08-21 16:00	Spa FC (P)	0–2	K.F.C. Verbroedering Geel (D2)
183	2005-08-21 16:00	K.R.C. Mechelen (D3)	1–1 (p 4–2)	R.U. Saint-Gilloise (D2)
184	2005-08-21 16:00	K.V. Kortrijk (D2)	1–4	FCN Sint-Niklaas (D3)
185	2005-08-20 20:00	K. Patro Eisden Maasmechelen (P)	1–3	VG Oostende (P)
186	2005-08-21 16:00	K.S.V. Oudenaarde (P)	2–1	K.A.S. Eupen (D2)
187	2005-08-21 16:00	KSK Wevelgem City (P)	0–2	K.S.K. Ronse (D2)
188	2005-08-21 16:00	K.V. Oostende (D2)	2–3	R.F.C. Tournai (D3)
189	2005-08-20 20:00	Royal Antwerp F.C. (D2)	2–4	White Star Woluwe F.C. (D3)
190	2005-08-21 16:00	K.R.C. Gent-Zeehaven (P)	0–1	A.F.C. Tubize (D2)
191	2005-08-21 15:00	Red Star Waasland (D2)	4–1	K.S.K. Heist (P)
192	2005-08-20 20:00	Tienen United (PR2)	1–3	Excelsior Virton (D2)
193	2005-08-21 16:00	Sprimont Comblain Sport (D3)	1–0	Sint-Eloois-Winkel Sport (P)
194	2005-08-21 16:00	U.R.S. du Centre (P)	3–1	C.S. Visé (D3)
195	2005-08-20 19:30	Torhout 1992 KM (D3)	4–2	K. Racing Waregem (D3)
196	2005-08-21 16:00	KAC Olen (P)	0–1	Francs Borains (D3)
197	2005-08-20 20:00	K.V. Turnhout (D3)	1–3	FCV Dender EH (D3)
198	2005-08-20 20:00	KVSK United Overpelt-Lommel (D2)	1–0	Léopold Uccle FC (P)

=== Round 5 ===
Tie no	Date and hour	Home team	Score	Away team
199	2005-08-28 16:00	KFC Zwarte Leeuw (P)	3–0	FCN Sint-Niklaas (D3)
200	2005-08-28 16:00	FCV Dender EH (D3)	5–0	A.F.C. Tubize (D2)
201	2005-08-27 16:00	K.S.V. Oudenaarde (P)	0–1	VG Oostende (P)
202	2005-08-28 16:00	K. Standaard Wetteren (D3)	0–2	Sprimont Comblain Sport (D3)
203	2005-08-27 17:00	RFC Union La Calamine (D3)	2–0	Excelsior Virton (D2)
204	2005-08-27 20:00	R.F.C. Tournai (D3)	4–0	U.R.S. du Centre (P)
205	2005-08-26 20:30	R.A.E.C. Mons (D2)	3–1	KV Mechelen (D2)
206	2005-08-27 18:00	Oud-Heverlee Leuven (D2)	5–0	K.F.C. Dessel Sport (D2)
207	2005-08-27 20:00	K.R.C. Mechelen (D3)	2–1	K.F.C. Vigor Wuitens Hamme (D2)
208	2005-08-28 16:00	Francs Borains (D3)	1–3	K.F.C. Verbroedering Geel (D2)
209	2005-08-27 20:00	Red Star Waasland (D2)	5–2	K.S.K. Ronse (D2)
210	2005-08-27 19:30	Torhout 1992 KM (D3)	2–0	Excelsior Veldwezelt (P)
211	2005-08-28 16:00	R.O.C. de Charleroi-Marchienne (D3)	1–0	K.M.S.K. Deinze (D2)
212	2005-08-27 20:00	KVSK United Overpelt-Lommel (D2)	0–3	White Star Woluwe F.C. (D3)

== Final Stages ==
Sixth Round
P	FC Zwarte Leeuw	0
AA Gent	3
D3	White Star Woluwé	2
Cercle Brugge	3
Standard Liège	2
D3	Olympic Charleroi	0
D3	Union La Calamine	0
Germinal Beerschot	2
SC Anderlecht	0 (5)
D2	Verbroedering Geel	0 (6)
SV Zulte-Waregem	2
Club Brugge	1
Lierse SK	1 (3)
SV Roeselare	1 (2)
VC Westerlo	4
D3	RC Mechelen	0
D3	Verbroedering Dender	0
Sint-Truidense VV	1
D3	FC Tournai	1
RC Genk	2
P	VG Oostende	0
Charleroi SC	1
FC Brussels	0
D2	Oud-Heverlee Leuven	1
Excelsior Mouscron	2
D3	Torhout 1992 KM	1
D2	AEC Mons	1
AA Louviéroise	0
D2	Red Star Waasland	0
SK Beveren	1
SC Lokeren	2
D3	Sprimont Comblain Sport	1

Seventh Round
AA Gent	1 (4)
Cercle Brugge	1 (2)
Standard Liège	1
Germinal Beerschot	0
D2	Verbroedering Geel	0
SV Zulte-Waregem	1
Lierse SK	1
VC Westerlo	2
Sint-Truidense VV	2
RC Genk	1
Charleroi SC	2
D2	Oud-Heverlee Leuven	0
Excelsior Mouscron	2
D2	AEC Mons	1
SK Beveren	5
SC Lokeren	1

Quarter-finals
AA Gent	2	2	4
Standard Liège	1	4	5
SV Zulte-Waregem (a.e.t.)	3	1	4
VC Westerlo	0	3	3
Sint-Truidense VV	0	0	0
Charleroi SC	0	2	2
Excelsior Mouscron	0	2	2
SK Beveren	0	0	0

Semifinals
Standard Liège	1	1	2
SV Zulte-Waregem	2	0	2
Charleroi SC	0	1	1
Excelsior Mouscron	1	1	2

Final
SV Zulte-Waregem	2
Excelsior Mouscron	1

=== Legend ===
- D2 = second division
- D3 = third division
- P = promotion

=== Final ===
13 May 2006
20:30 CEST

Zulte Waregem	2–1	Mouscron
Leleu 11'; Matthys 90+1'	Report	Čustović 62'

King Baudouin Stadium, Brussels
Attendance: 24,000
Referee: Paul Allaerts

== See also ==
- Belgian Cup - main article
