= SV Zulte Waregem =

Belgian professional football club

Zulte Waregem
- Full name: Sportvereniging Zulte Waregem
- Nicknames: Essevee, De Boeren
- Founded: 1 July 2001; 25 years ago
- Ground: Regenboogstadion
- Capacity: 12,250
- Chairman: Lode Hullebusch
- Head coach: Michael Beale
- League: Belgian Pro League
- 2025–26: Belgian Pro League, 13th of 16
- Website: essevee.be
Home colours	Away colours	Third colours

Sportvereniging Zulte Waregem (Dutch pronunciation: [ˈspɔrtfəˌreːnəɣɪŋ ˈzʏltə ˈʋaːrəɣɛm]), commonly known as Zulte Waregem or by their nickname Essevee (Dutch pronunciation: [ɛsəˈveː]), is a Belgian professional football club based in Waregem, West Flanders. The club set to play in Belgian Pro League from 2025–26 after promotion from Challenger Pro League in 2024–25. Their highest finish at the highest level was second place in 2012–13. They have won two Belgian Cups. They qualified for the 2006–07 UEFA Cup, losing in the round of 32 to Newcastle United. Also in the seasons 2013–14 and 2017–18 they managed to play in the Europa League group stages. On both occasions the club ended third in their group.

The club is a product of a partnership in 2001 between Zultse VV and KSV Waregem, a former first division regular. No merger was applied. Zulte Waregem first reached the highest level in Belgian football by winning the 2004–05 second division. The club uniforms are red and green. They play their home matches at the Regenboogstadion, the former stadium of KSV Waregem.

== History ==
Zulte Sportief was founded in 1950 and directly became a member of the national association (matricule n° 5381). The club Zultse V.V. (with the same matricule) was started after the 1976 merger between Zulte Sportief and S.K. Zulte. In 2001, the team merged with KSV Waregem, who had played in the first division for many years. No team from Zulte ever achieved promotion to the second division before SV Zulte Waregem in 2002. Zultse V.V., though, gained access to the third division in 1995. The club finished 14th out of 16 for two seasons and was relegated the second time after the playoff.

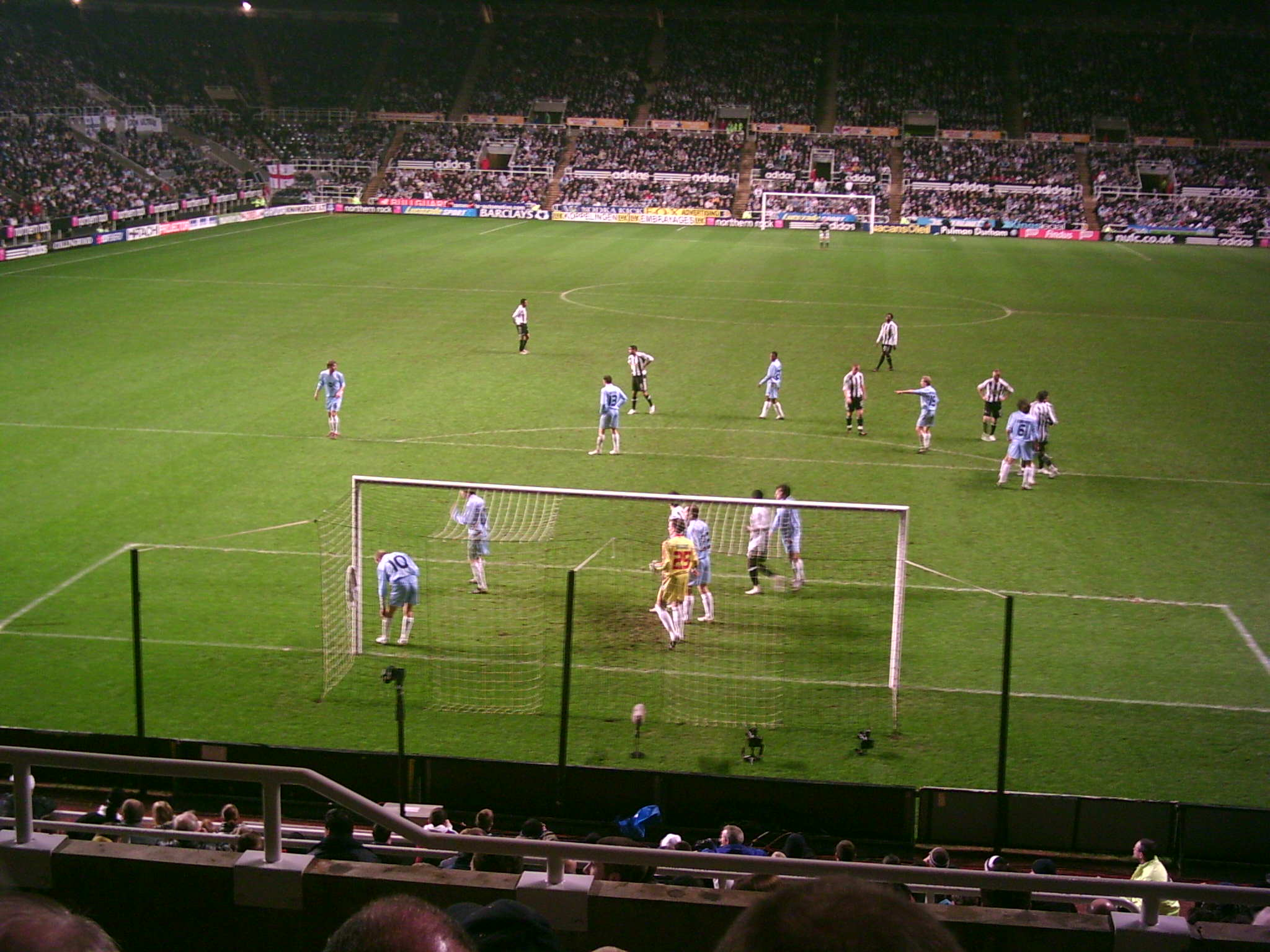
Zulte Waregem playing Newcastle United in a UEFA Cup tie.

In 1999, the season in which it came back, Zultse finished fourth in this division. Two years later, the new club became champion of the 3rd division A. The registered office of Zulte Waregem lies in Zulte, but the club is based in the stadium of KSV Waregem in Waregem and the red and white colours of KSV Waregem prevail.

The club got a chance to shine on the European stage during the 2006–07 UEFA Cup, reaching the round of 32, playing against English club Newcastle United, although they lost 4–1 on aggregate. Their second European appearance was in the 2013–14 season, as Zulte Waregem finished second in 2012–13 Belgian Pro League and qualified for the third qualifying stage of the 2013–14 UEFA Champions League, where they lost to PSV (5–0 on aggregate). Zulte Waregem dropped to the 2013–14 UEFA Europa League play-off round, where they defeated APOEL, drawing 1–1 at home and winning 1–2 in Nicosia thanks to a late goal from Jens Naessens. At the group stage, they were drawn alongside Rubin Kazan, Wigan Athletic and Maribor. Zulte Waregem started with a draw against Wigan. After, they lost to Rubin (4–0) and Maribor (1–3), but later managed to defeat Maribor at Ljudski vrt (0–1) and Wigan at DW Stadium (1–2). Finally, a loss against Rubin at home and Maribor's win over Wigan eliminated Zulte Waregem from the European competition. In the 2016–17 season, Zulte Waregem drew an average home attendance of 9,578.

After a series of disappointing seasons in which the threat of relegation was narrowly avoided each time, things took a turn for the worse for head coach and club legend Francky Dury in the fall of 2021. The relationship between him and a portion of the supporters also became increasingly strained, ultimately leading to his dismissal in January 2022. The 2021–22 season was managed by assistants Timmy Simons and Davy De fauw, but they too failed to achieve results. As a result, the team narrowly avoided the relegation playoffs. In June 2022, former club top goalscorer Mbaye Leye was appointed as the new head coach.

In 2022–23 season, Zulte Waregem fell victim to the new league restructuring, which meant that there would be as many as three relegations that season. Zulte, being the club with the statistically worst defence, ended up suffering relegation after 18 successive seasons in the top tier.

On 18 April 2025, Zulte-Waregem secure champions of Challenger Pro League and promotion to Belgian Pro League from next season after defeat RWD Molenbeek 2-1 in final matchweek with goal Tobias Hedl and Jelle Vossen in 39th and 86th minute, respectively, return to top tier after two years absence and ended two years stint in second tier.

== Stadium ==
Zulte Waregem plays its home matches at the Regenboogstadion, meaning "Rainbow Stadium" in Dutch. The stadium used to be the home of K.S.V. Waregem until the withdrawal of the club. It has a capacity of 12.250 and has been renovated lately to host European games. The Regenboogstadion meets UEFA's requirements for hosting European games (Category 4 stadium), so Zulte Waregem's home matches can be played in their own stadium, which they did in de 2017-2018 Europa League competition. Zulte Waregem has an average attendance of 9.500 people at home games.

== Honours ==
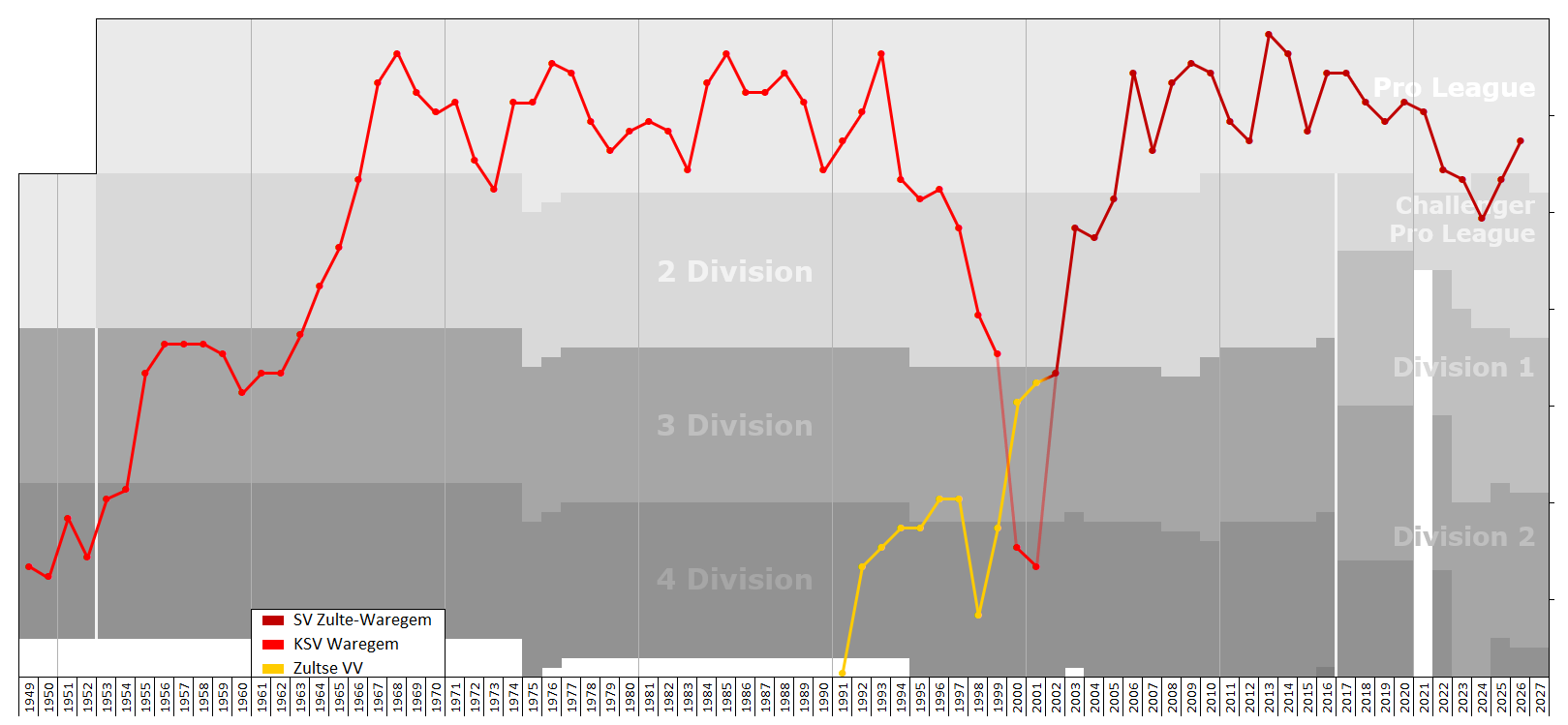
Historical chart of SV Zulte Waregem league performance

- Challenger Pro League:
  - Winners: 2024–25
- Belgian Second Division:
  - Winners: 2004–05
- Belgian Cup:
  - Winners: 2005–06, 2016–17

== European record ==
Season	Competition	Round	Club	Home	Away	Aggregate
2006–07	UEFA Cup	1R	(Russia) Lokomotiv Moscow	2–0	1–2	3–2
2006–07	UEFA Cup	Grp F	Austria Wien	—N/a	4–1	3rd
2006–07	UEFA Cup	Grp F	(Czech Republic) Sparta Prague	3–1	—N/a	3rd
2006–07	UEFA Cup	Grp F	(Spain) Espanyol	—N/a	2–6	3rd
2006–07	UEFA Cup	Grp F	(Netherlands) Ajax	0–3	—N/a	3rd
2006–07	UEFA Cup	R32	(England) Newcastle United	1–3	0–1	1–4
2013–14	UEFA Champions League	3Q	(Netherlands) PSV	0–3	0–2	0–5
2013–14	UEFA Europa League	PO	(Cyprus) APOEL	1–1	2–1	3–2
2013–14	UEFA Europa League	Grp D	(Slovenia) Maribor	1–3	1–0	3rd
2013–14	UEFA Europa League	Grp D	(Russia) Rubin Kazan	0–2	0–4	3rd
2013–14	UEFA Europa League	Grp D	(England) Wigan Athletic	0–0	2–1	3rd
2014–15	UEFA Europa League	2Q	(Poland) Zawisza Bydgoszcz	2–1	3–1	5–2
2014–15	UEFA Europa League	3Q	(Belarus) Shakhtyor Soligorsk	2–5	2–2	4–7
2017–18	UEFA Europa League	Grp	(France) Nice	1–5	1–3	3rd
2017–18	UEFA Europa League	Grp	(Italy) Lazio	3–2	0–2	3rd
2017–18	UEFA Europa League	Grp	(Netherlands) Vitesse Arnhem	1–1	2–0	3rd

== Players ==
As of 12 September 2026

Note: Flags indicate national team as defined under FIFA eligibility rules; some limited exceptions apply. Players may hold more than one non-FIFA nationality.

No.	Pos.	Nation	Player
1	GK	BEL	Louis Bostyn
4	DF	BEL	Laurent Lemoine (captain)
5	DF	DEN	Jakob Kiilerich
6	MF	GER	Enrique Lofolomo
7	FW	SRB	Nikola Mituljikić
8	MF	BEL	Thomas Claes
10	FW	SEN	Malick Mbaye
11	FW	FRA	Marley Aké
12	DF	HAI	Wilguens Paugain
13	GK	BEL	Brent Gabriël
15	DF	SEN	Youssoupha Mbodji (on loan from Slavia Prague)
18	FW	DEN	Anosike Ementa
19	MF	CRO	Niko Horvat (on loan from Borussia Mönchengladbach)
20	FW	AUT	Tobias Hedl

No.	Pos.	Nation	Player
21	MF	HUN	Zalán Átrok
22	FW	SEN	Ousseynou Niang
23	DF	MLI	Salim Diakité (on loan from Palermo)
24	DF	SEN	Mouhamadou Sall
25	MF	DEN	Tristan Panduro
36	MF	ALB	Serxho Ujka
40	MF	BEL	Dirk Asare
41	GK	BEL	Florian Van Bever
42	GK	BEL	Arnaud Dobbels
45	DF	BEL	Benoit De Jaegere
49	DF	BEL	Franz Tangala
53	DF	NED	Kewan Vemba
55	DF	BEL	Yannick Cappelle
90	FW	BEL	Hemsley Akpa-Chukwu

=== Out on loan ===
Note: Flags indicate national team as defined under FIFA eligibility rules; some limited exceptions apply. Players may hold more than one non-FIFA nationality.

No. / Pos. / Nation / Player; — / DF / SEN / Moussa Seck (at Harju until 31 December 2026)	No. / Pos. / Nation / Player; — / DF / TUR / Kadir Seven (at Vanspor until 30 June 2027)

== Coaching staff ==
Position	Name
Head coach	(Belgium) Steve Colpaert
Assistant coach	(Belgium) Dwight Waeytens (Netherlands) Mark Luijpers
Goalkeeper coach	(Belgium) Reggie De Neve
Fitness coach	(France) Yohwen Guihard
Video analyst	(Belgium) Jeroen Burns
Doctor	(Belgium) Lode Dalewyn (France) Lauren Pringels (Belgium) Jonas Demeester
Physiotherapist	(Belgium) Siebe Vercaempst (England) Simon Cottens (Belgium) Johan Vanderheeren (Belgium) Casper Dewitte
Equipment manager	(England) Roger Putman
Team manager	(Belgium) Giel Eggermont

== Managers ==
- (Belgium) Francky Dury (1 July 2001 – 30 June 2010)
- (Belgium) Bart De Roover (1 July 2010 – 24 October 2010)
- (Belgium) Hugo Broos (27 October 2010 – 23 May 2011)
- (Bosnia and Herzegovina) Darije Kalezić (1 July 2011 – 27 December 2011)
- (Belgium) Francky Dury (30 December 2011 – 16 December 2021)
- (Belgium) Timmy Simons (17 December 2021 - 30 June 2022)
- (Belgium) Mbaye Leye (17 May 2022 - 15 March 2023)
- (Belgium) Frederik Dhollander (15 March 2023 - 5 September 2023)
- (Belgium) Vincent Euvrard (5 September 2023 - 1 July 2024)
- (Belgium) Sven Vandenbroeck (1 July 2024 - 9 March 2026)
- (Belgium) Steve Colpaert (9 March 2026 - 19 May 2026)
- (England) Michael Beale (19 May 2026 - Present)
