= 2008–09 RSC Anderlecht season =

Anderlecht
2009–10 season
- President: Roger Vanden Stock
- Head coach: Ariël Jacobs
- Stadium: Constant Vanden Stock Stadium
- Belgian First Division: 2nd
- Belgian Cup: Seventh round
- Belgian Super Cup: Runners-up
- UEFA Champions League: Second qualifying round
- Top goalscorer: League: Mbark Boussoufa (11); All: Mbark Boussoufa (11)

During the 2008–09 season Anderlecht competed in the Belgian First Division, Belgian Cup, and Champions League. Anderlecht competed in the Belgian Super Cup as cup-winners, but lost to Standard Liège.

After the 34 league matches, they ended with 77 points tied for first place. As Standard Liège had the same number of points and the same number of matches won, test matches were organised to determine the winner. Anderlecht drew 1–1 at home but then lost 1–0 at Standard and thus ended in second position. In the cup they were eliminated in the early rounds by Mechelen, who progressed on to lose the final.

Anderlecht failed to progress past the second qualifying round of UEFA Champions League.

== Players ==
N	Pos.	Nat.	Name	Age	EU	Since	App	Goals	Ends	Transfer fee	Notes
25	GK	(Belgium)	Bruzzese	19	EU	2007					
28	GK	(Belgium)	Cordier	24	EU	2009					
22	GK	(Belgium)	Schollen	30	EU	2006			2009		
1	GK	(Czech Republic)	Zítka	33	EU	2002			2010		
27	RB	(Poland)	Wasilewski	28	EU	2007			2011		
26	CB	(Honduras)	Bernárdez	26	Non-EU	2009			2009		
32	CB	(Belgium)	Gillis	19	EU					Youth system	
23	CB	(Hungary)	Juhász	25	EU	2003			2011		
4	CB	(Netherlands)	Kruiswijk	24	EU	2008			2012		
44	CB	(Serbia)	Rnić	24	EU	2008			2011	Free	
18	CB	(Belgium)	Servaes	20	EU	2008					
6	CB	(Belgium)	Van Damme	25	EU	2006			2010		
3	LB	(Belgium)	Deschacht (VC)	27	EU	1996			2011		
5	DM	(Argentina)	Biglia	22	Non-EU	2006			2010		
30	DM	(Belgium)	Gillet	23	EU	2008			2013		
12	AM	(Belgium)	Chatelle	27	EU	2008			2011		
13	AM	(Belgium)	Legear	21	EU	2003			2011		
11	MF	(Netherlands) (Morocco)	Boussoufa	24	EU	2006			2012		
35	MF	(Belgium)	Crommen	17	EU					Youth system	
20	MF	(Ukraine)	Yakovenko	21	EU	2008			2012		
17	MF	(Argentina)	Losada	26	Non-EU	2008				Undisclosed	
8	MF	(Czech Republic)	Polák	27	EU	2007			2011		
99	MF	(Ivory Coast)	Saré	18	Non-EU					Youth system	
29	CF	(Russia)	Bulykin	29	EU	2008				€ 1m	
21	CF	(Belgium)	De Sutter	23	EU	2009			2013		
19	CF	(Argentina)	Frutos	27	Non-EU	2005			2010		
	CF	(Belgium)	Lukaku	15	EU	2009				Youth system	
9	CF	(Argentina)	Suárez	20	Non-EU	2008			2013	€ 1.2m	
7	CF	(Czech Republic)	Vlček	32	EU	2008			2009		

- Last updated: 27 December 2008
- Source: rsca.be, players' Wikipedia articles, soccerbase.com, ESPN (for appearances and goals) and footballdatabase.com (for EU passport, contract ending and transfer fee)
- Ordered by position on pitch (from back right to front left).

== Transfers 2008-09 ==
=== Players in ===
No.	Pos.	Nat.	Name	Age	EU	Moving from	Type	Transfer window	Ends	Transfer fee	Source
26	CB	(Honduras)	Bernárdez	26	Non-EU	Motagua (Honduras)	Transferred ✓	Winter	2009	Undisclosed	laprensahn.com
29	CF	(Russia)	Bulykin	29	Non-EU	Bayer Leverkusen (Germany)	Transferred ✓	Summer		€1M	
28	GK	(Belgium)	Cordier	24	EU	Brussels	Transferred ✓	Winter		Undisclosed	
21	CF	(Belgium)	De Sutter	23	EU	Cercle Brugge	Transferred ✓	Winter	2013	Undisclosed	sporza.be
20	MF	(Ukraine)	Yakovenko	21	EU	Genk	Transferred ✓	Summer	2012	Undisclosed	sporza.be
	CF	(Brazil)	Kanu	21	Non-EU	Barueri (Brazil)	Transferred ✓	Summer	2009	Undisclosed	
	MF	(Senegal)	Kouyaté	19	Non-EU	Brussels	Transferred ✓	Summer		Undisclosed	
	CB	(Netherlands)	Kruiswijk	24	EU	Groningen (Netherlands)	Transferred ✓	Summer	2012	Free	rsca.be
	MF	(Argentina)	Losada	26	Non-EU	Germinal Beerschot	Transferred ✓	Summer		Undisclosed	
	CB	(Serbia)	Rnić	24	Non-EU	Partizan (Serbia)	Transferred ✓	Summer	2011	Free	sporza.be
18	CB	(Belgium)	Servaes	20	EU	Brussels	Transferred ✓	Summer		Undisclosed	
	CF	(Argentina)	Suárez	20	Non-EU	Belgrano (Argentina)	Transferred ✓	Summer	2013	€1.2M	sporza.be

=== Players out ===
No.	Pos.	Nat.	Name	Age	EU	Moving to	Type	Transfer window	Transfer fee	Source
24	CF	(Turkey)	Akın	27	Non-EU	Kocaelispor (Turkey)	Contract ended ✓	Summer	Free	
31	DM	(Belgium)	De Man	25	EU	Roda JC (Netherlands)	Transferred ✓	Summer	Undisclosed	
14	AM	(Belgium)	Goor	35	EU	Germinal Beerschot	Transferred ✓	Winter	Undisclosed	
10	AM	(Egypt)	Hassan	33	Non-EU	Al Ahly (Egypt)	Contract ended ✓	Summer	Free	
	MF	(Belgium)	Kums	20	EU	Kortrijk	Transferred ✓	Summer	Undisclosed	
9	CF	(Belgium)	Mpenza	32	EU	Larissa (Greece)	Contract ended ✓	Summer	Free	Sporza.be
26	CB	(Argentina)	Pareja	24	Non-EU	Espanyol (Spain)	Transferred ✓	Summer	Undisclosed	
40	CF	(Belgium)	Pieroni	28	EU	Nantes (France)	Loan ended ✓	Summer	n/a	Sporza.be
15	FW	(France)	Théréau	25	EU	Charleroi	Transferred ✓	Summer	Undisclosed	Sporza.be
	MF	(Ivory Coast)	Tioté	22	Non-EU	Twente (Netherlands)	Transferred ✓	Summer	€2M	Sporza.be

Last updated: 27 December 2008
EU = if holds or not a European Union passport; Country: when 2 flags, 1st flag = country that plays for internationally, 2nd flag = country of birth; N = number on jersey; P = Position (for position name, pause mouse pointer on abbreviation); Name = Name on jersey (for more extensive name, pause mouse pointer on name); Age = age on the day of the signing; Moving from = only indicate the club the player was playing before start playing for this club in this season, for the type of the moving see Status column; Moving to = only indicates the club the player is going to play next, for the type of the moving see Status column; Ends = when the player's current contract ends; n/a = Not applicable.

=== Loaned out ===
No.	Pos.	Nat.	Name	Age	EU	Moving to	Type	Transfer window	Transfer fee	Source
	CF	(Brazil)	Kanu	21	Non-EU	Cercle Brugge	Loaned out ✓	Winter	n/a	
	MF	(Senegal)	Kouyaté	19	Non-EU	Kortrijk	Loaned out ✓	Summer	n/a	
	GK	(Democratic Republic of the Congo)	Mulopo Kudimbana	21	EU	Union Saint-Gilloise	Loaned out ✓	Summer	n/a	
	GK	(Belgium)	Proto	25	EU	Germinal Beerschot	Loaned out ✓	Summer	n/a	
	MF	(Cameroon)	Siani	22	Non-EU	Sint-Truiden	Loaned out ✓	Summer	n/a	

Last updated: 29 May 2008
EU = if holds or not a European Union passport; Country: when 2 flags, 1st flag = country that plays for internationally, 2nd flag = country of birth; N = number on jersey; P = Position (for position name, pause mouse pointer on abbreviation); Name = Name on jersey (for more extensive name, pause mouse pointer on name); Age = age on the day of the signing; Moving from = only indicate the club the player was playing before start playing for this club in this season, for the type of the moving see Status column; Moving to = only indicates the club the player is going to play next, for the type of the moving see Status column; Ends = when the player's current contract ends; n/a = Not applicable.

== Competitions ==
Competition	Started round	Current position / round	Final position / round	First match	Last match
Belgian Supercup	—	—		9 Aug 2008	
Jupiler League	—	—		16 Aug 2008	May 2009
Champions League	Second Qualifying Round	—	Second Qualifying Round	30 July 2008	6 Aug 2008
Belgian Cup	Round 6	—			

Updated to match played 24 July 2008
Source: Competitions

=== Jupiler Pro League ===
==== Classification ====
Pos	Team	Pld	W	D	L	GF	GA	GD	Pts	Qualification or relegation
1	Standard Liège (C)	34	24	5	5	66	26	+40	77 (Note: The championship was decided in a playoff (see below).)	Qualification to Champions League group stage
2	Anderlecht	34	24	5	5	75	30	+45	77	Qualification to Champions League third qualifying round
3	Club Brugge	34	18	5	11	59	50	+9	59	Qualification to Europa League third qualifying round
4	Gent	34	17	8	9	67	42	+25	59	Qualification to Europa League second qualifying round
5	Zulte Waregem	34	16	7	11	55	36	+19	55	

Source: soccerway.com
Rules for classification: 1) points; 2) number of matches won; if teams are still tied a playoff is organised.
(C) Champions

==== Results summary ====
Overall								Home						Away					
Pld	W	D	L	GF	GA	GD	Pts	W	D	L	GF	GA	GD	W	D	L	GF	GA	GD
34	24	5	5	75	30	+45	77	14	1	2	48	15	+33	10	4	3	27	15	+12

Source: Jupiler League

==== Results by round ====
Round	1	2	3	4	5	6	7	8	9	10	11	12	13	14	15	16	17	18	19	20	21	22	23	24	25	26	27	28	29	30	31	32	33	34
Ground	A	H	H	A	H	A	H	A	H	A	H	A	H	A	H	A	H	H	A	H	A	A	H	A	H	A	H	A	H	A	H	A	H	A
Result	W	D	W	W	W	L	W	L	W	W	L	D	W	W	W	W	W	L	W	W	W	W	W	D	W	L	W	D	W	W	W	D	W	W
Position	2	4	2	2	1	2	1	3	3	2	3	4	3	2	1	1	1	1	2	2	2	2	1	1	1	2	1	1	1	1	1	1	1	2

Source: Competitive Matches and Soccerassociation.com
A = Away; H = Home; W = Win; D = Draw; L = Loss

== Squad statistics ==
=== Squad ===
Appearances for competitive matches only

No.	Pos.	Name	League		Title Playoff		UEFA Champions League		Belgian Cup		Belgian Super Cup		Total	
No.	Pos.	Name	Apps	Goals	Apps	Goals	Apps	Goals	Apps	Goals	Apps	Goals	Apps	Goals
1	GK	(Czech Republic) Daniel Zítka	14	0	0	0	2	0	0	0	0	0	16	0
3	DF	(Belgium) Olivier Deschacht	32	0	1	0	1	0	2	0	1	0	37	0
4	DF	(Netherlands) Arnold Kruiswijk	15(2)	0	0	0	1	0	1	0	0	0	17(2)	0
5	MF	(Argentina) Lucas Biglia	28(2)	2	1	0	1	1	1	0	1	0	32(2)	3
6	DF	(Belgium) Jelle Van Damme	21(1)	3	1	0	0	0	1	0	0	0	23(1)	3
7	FW	(Czech Republic) Stanislav Vlček	10(1)	4	0	0	1	0	0	0	1	0	12(1)	4
8	MF	(Czech Republic) Jan Polák	25(1)	2	1	0	2	1	2	0	1	0	31(1)	3
9	FW	(Argentina) Matías Suárez	4(7)	1	0	0	0(2)	0	1(1)	1	1	1	6(10)	3
11	MF	(Morocco) Mbark Boussoufa	31(2)	11	1	0	2	0	2	0	1	0	37(2)	11
12	MF	(Belgium) Thomas Chatelle	12(14)	4	1	0	1(1)	0	1(1)	0	0	0	15(16)	4
13	MF	(Belgium) Jonathan Legear	15(11)	5	0(1)	1	0(1)	0	0(1)	1	0(1)	0	15(15)	7
17	MF	(Argentina) Hernán Losada	8(13)	1	0	0	1	0	1(1)	1	1	0	11(14)	2
18	DF	(Belgium) Gil Servaes	0	0	0	0	0	0	0	0	0	0	0	0
19	FW	(Argentina) Nicolás Frutos	6(1)	6	0	0	0	0	0	0	0	0	6(1)	6
20	MF	(Ukraine) Oleksandr Yakovenko	3(16)	2	0(1)	0	0	0	0	0	0	0	3(17)	2
21	FW	(Belgium) Tom De Sutter	16	9	1	0	0	0	1	0	0	0	18	9
22	GK	(Belgium) Davy Schollen	20(1)	0	1	0	0	0	2	0	0	0	23(1)	0
23	DF	(Hungary) Roland Juhász	31	4	1	0	2	0	2	0	1	0	37	4
25	GK	(Belgium) Sébastien Bruzzese	0	0	0	0	0	0	0	0	0	0	0	0
26	DF	(Honduras) Víctor Bernárdez	5(2)	1	0	0	0	0	0	0	0	0	5(2)	1
27	DF	(Poland) Marcin Wasilewski	27(1)	8	1	0	1	0	1	0	0	0	30(1)	8
28	GK	(Belgium) Michaël Cordier	0	0	0	0	0	0	0	0	0	0	0	0
29	FW	(Russia) Dmitri Bulykin	4(6)	3	0	0	0	0	1(1)	0	0	0	5(7)	3
30	MF	(Belgium) Guillaume Gillet	33	8	1	0	2	1	2	0	1	0	39	9
32	DF	(Belgium) Cor Gillis	0	0	0	0	0	0	0	0	0	0	0	0
34	MF	(Democratic Republic of the Congo) Olivier Mukendi	0(1)	0	0	0	0	0	0	0	0	0	0(1)	0
35	DF	(Belgium) Niels Houman	0	0	0	0	0	0	0	0	0	0	0	0
44	DF	(Serbia) Nemanja Rnić	6(1)	0	0	0	1	0	1	0	0(1)	0	8(2)	0
47	DF	(Belgium) Quentin Crommen	0	0	0	0	0	0	0	0	0	0	0	0
99	MF	(Ivory Coast) Bakary Saré	6(3)	0	0	0	0	0	0(1)	0	0(1)	0	6(5)	0
	MF	(Belgium) Bart Goor	2(6)	1	0	0	2	0	0	0	1	0	5(6)	1
	FW	(Brazil) Kanu	0(1)	0	0	0	2	0	0	0	0(1)	0	2(2)	0
	MF	(Senegal) Cheikhou Kouyaté	0	0	0	0	0	0	0	0	0	0	0	0
	FW	(Belgium) Roland Lamah	0	0	0	0	0	0	0	0	0(1)	0	0(1)	0
	DF	(Argentina) Nicolás Pareja	0	0	0	0	0	0	0	0	0	0	0	0
	GK	(Belgium) Silvio Proto	0	0	0	0	0	0	0	0	1	0	1	0

Note: during the summer transfer window, Kouyaté and Proto are loaned out while Lamah and Pareja were sold. During the winter transfer window, Goor was sold and Kanu was loaned out.

As of game played May 21, 2009

=== Scorers ===
Last updated on May 21, 2009.

==== Per Competition ====
P	Player	League	Title Playoff	UCL	Cup	Super Cup	Total
1	(Morocco) Mbark Boussoufa	11	0	0	0	0	11
2	(Belgium) Tom De Sutter	9	0	0	0	0	9
=	(Belgium) Guillaume Gillet	8	0	1	0	0	9
4	(Poland) Marcin Wasilewski	8	0	0	0	0	8
5	(Belgium) Jonathan Legear	5	1	0	1	0	7
6	(Argentina) Nicolás Frutos	6	0	0	0	0	6
7	(Belgium) Thomas Chatelle	4	0	0	0	0	4
=	(Hungary) Roland Juhász	4	0	0	0	0	4
=	(Czech Republic) Stanislav Vlček	4	0	0	0	0	4
10	(Argentina) Lucas Biglia	2	0	1	0	0	3
=	(Russia) Dmitri Bulykin	3	0	0	0	0	3
=	(Czech Republic) Jan Polák	2	0	1	0	0	3
=	(Argentina) Matías Suárez	1	0	0	1	1	3
=	(Belgium) Jelle Van Damme	3	0	0	0	0	3
15	(Ukraine) Oleksandr Yakovenko	2	0	0	0	0	2
=	(Argentina) Hernán Losada	1	0	0	1	0	2
17	(Honduras) Víctor Bernárdez	1	0	0	0	0	1
=	(Belgium) Bart Goor	1	0	0	0	0	1
=	(Serbia) Nemanja Rnić	0	0	0	1	0	1

==== Per Match ====
The list of matches is chronological, as presented at the list of competitive matches.

A '-' denotes the player was at that time not on the books of Anderlecht.

Total	Player		Goals per Match																																								
Total	Player		CLQ2 H	CLQ2 A	SC	1	2	3	4	5	6	7	8	9	10	11	CUP R6	12	13	14	15	16	17	CUP R7	18	19	20	21	22	23	24	25	26	27	28	29	30	31	32	33	34	TP H	TP A
11	(Morocco)	Mbark Boussoufa										1		1				1	1		1						1			2						1				1	1		
9	(Belgium)	Tom De Sutter	-	-	-	-	-	-	-	-	-	-	-	-	-	-	-	-	-	-	-	-	-			2		1		1		1	1				1	2					
9	(Belgium)	Guillaume Gillet	1				1		1					1	1					1	1		1		1																		
8	(Poland)	Marcin Wasilewski							1						1															1		1		1				1	1		1		
7	(Belgium)	Jonathan Legear				1										1	1				1	1	1																			1	
6	(Argentina)	Nicolás Frutos												3		1				1	1																						
4	(Hungary)	Roland Juhász						1																			1	1	1														
4	(Czech Republic)	Stanislav Vlček					1			1				1													1																
3	(Argentina)	Lucas Biglia		1															1																					1			
3	(Russia)	Dmitri Bulykin						2						1																													
3	(Belgium)	Thomas Chatelle				1						1																			1							1					
3	(Czech Republic)	Jan Polák		1																	1	1																					
3	(Argentina)	Matías Suárez			1												1																	1									
3	(Belgium)	Jelle Van Damme				1				1																														1			
2	(Ukraine)	Oleksandr Yakovenko						1			1																																
2	(Argentina)	Hernán Losada													1		1																										
1	(Honduras)	Víctor Bernárdez	-	-	-	-	-	-	-	-	-	-	-	-	-	-	-	-	-	-	-	-	-					1															
1	(Belgium)	Bart Goor																				1		-	-	-	-	-	-	-	-	-	-	-	-	-	-	-	-	-	-	-	-
1	(Serbia)	Nemanja Rnić																						1																			

A goal was scored from a penalty kick
Two goals were scored from penalty kicks

=== Disciplinary record ===
N	Pos.	Nat.	Name	Yellow card	Second yellow card	Red card	Notes
3	DF	(Belgium)	O. Deschacht	4	0	0	
5	MF	(Argentina)	L. Biglia	4	0	0	
6	DF	(Belgium)	J. Van Damme	6	0	0	
8	MF	(Czech Republic)	J. Polák	6	1	0	
9	MF	(Argentina)	M. Suárez	1	0	0	
10	FW	(Brazil)	Kanu	2	0	0	
11	MF	(Morocco)	M. Boussoufa	6	0	0	
13	MF	(Belgium)	J. Legear	4	0	0	
14	MF	(Belgium)	B. Goor	1	0	0	
17	MF	(Argentina)	H. Losada	5	0	0	
19	MF	(Argentina)	N. Frutos	2	1	0	
20	MF	(Ukraine)	O. Iakovenko	3	0	0	
21	FW	(Belgium)	T. De Sutter	3	0	0	
22	GK	(Belgium)	D. Schollen	1	0	0	
23	DF	(Hungary)	R. Juhász	7	1	0	
26	DF	(Honduras)	V. Bernárdez	1	0	0	
27	DF	(Poland)	M. Wasilewski	10	1	0	
29	FW	(Russia)	D. Bulykin	1	0	0	
30	MF	(Belgium)	G. Gillet	4	0	0	
44	DF	(Serbia)	N. Rnić	3	1	1	
99	MF	(Ivory Coast)	B. Saré	2	1	0	

Last updated: May 22, 2009
Source: Match reports in Competitive matches
Only competitive matches
(yellow card) = Number of bookings; (second yellow card) = Number of sending offs after a second yellow card; (red card) = Number of sending offs by a direct red card.

== Competitive Matches ==
Game	Date	Tournament	Round	Ground	Opponent	Score^{1}	Report
1	30 Jul 2008	Champions League	Second Qualifying Round	H	BATE Borisov (Belarus)	1 – 2	Kick off: 20:30 CET; Referee: Aleksandar Stavrev 66' Gillet
2	6 Aug 2008	Champions League	Second Qualifying Round	A (Belarus)	BATE Borisov (Belarus)	2 – 2	Kick off: 19:00 CET; Referee: Alan Kelly 22' (pen.) Biglia; 86' Polák
3	9 Aug 2008	Belgian Supercup	Final	A	Standard Liège	1 – 3	Referee: Paul Allaerts 73' (pen.) Suárez
4	16 Aug 2008	Jupiler League	1	A	Cercle Brugge	3 – 0	Kick off: 20:00 CET; Attendance: 19,000; Referee: Tim Pots 15' Van Damme; 59' Legear; 86' (pen.) Chatelle
5	23 Aug 2008	Jupiler League	2	H	Gent	2 – 2	Kick off: 20:00 CET; Attendance: 24,297; Referee: Jérôme Efong Nzolo 7' Vlček; 25' Gillet
6	30 Aug 2008	Jupiler League	3	H	Kortrijk	4 – 0	Kick off: 20:00 CET; Attendance: 23,851; Referee: Joeri van de Velde 30' Bulykin; 45' Juhász; 50' Bulykin; 79' Yakovenko
7	13 Sep 2008	Jupiler League	4	A	Mons	2 – 1	Kick off: 18:00 CET; Attendance: 9,000; Referee: Serge Gumienny 41' Wasilewski; 79' Gillet
8	19 Sep 2008	Jupiler League	5	H	Charleroi	2 – 0	Kick off: 20:30 CET; Attendance: 24,091; Referee: Stéphane Breda 81' Van Damme; 88' Vlček
9	26 Sep 2008	Jupiler League	6	A	Standard Liège	1 – 2	Kick off: 20:30 CET; Attendance: 25,000; Referee: Paul Allaerts 56' Yakovenko
10	3 Oct 2008	Jupiler League	7	H	Mouscron	2 – 1	Kick off: 20:30 CET; Attendance: 23,172; Referee: Frank De Bleeckere 30' Boussoufa; 53' (pen.) Chatelle
11	19 Oct 2008	Jupiler League	8	A	Zulte Waregem	0 – 4	Kick off: 20:30 CET; Attendance: 8,563; Referee: Jean-Baptist Bultynck
12	25 Oct 2008	Jupiler League	9	H	Mechelen	7 – 1	Kick off: 20:00 CET; Attendance: 23,824; Referee: Alain Hamer 17' Vlček; 30' Frutos; 35' Frutos; 39' Boussoufa; 57' Frutos; 81' Gillet; 90' Bulykin
13	2 Nov 2008	Jupiler League	10	A	Germinal Beerschot	3 – 1	Kick off: 20:30 CET; Attendance: 12,000; Referee: Jérôme Efong Nzolo 63' Wasilewski; 66' Gillet; 71' Losada
14	8 Nov 2008	Jupiler League	11	H	Lokeren	2 – 3	Kick off: 20:00 CET; Attendance: 23,074; Referee: Johan Verbist 66' Legear; 73' Frutos
15	11 Nov 2008	Belgian Cup	Sixth	H	Tournai	3 – 1	Kick off: 18:00 CET; Attendance: 21,860; Referee: Frederik Geldhof 10' Losada; 68' Legear; 86' Suárez
16	16 Nov 2008	Jupiler League	12	A	Club Brugge	1 – 1	Kick off: 13:00 CET; Referee: Frank De Bleeckere 50' Boussoufa
17	22 Nov 2008	Jupiler League	13	H	Westerlo	2 – 0	Kick off: 20:00 CET; Attendance: 23,347; Referee: Paul Allaerts 13' Boussoufa; 89' Biglia
18	28 Nov 2008	Jupiler League	14	A	Dender	2 – 0	Kick off: 20:30 CET; Attendance: 8,005; Referee: Claude Bourdouxhe 3' Gillet; 51' Frutos
19	6 Dec 2008	Jupiler League	15	H	Tubize	5 – 1	Kick off: 20:00 CET; Attendance: 23,148; Referee: Serge Gumienny 20' Frutos; 25' Boussoufa; 28' Gillet; 50' Polák; 56' Legear
20	14 Dec 2008	Jupiler League	16	A	Roeselare	3 – 0	Kick off: 18:00 CET; Attendance: 8,000; Referee: Peter Vervecken 64' Legear; 81' Polák; 89' Goor
21	19 Dec 2008	Jupiler League	17	H	Genk	2 – 0	Kick off: 20:30 CET; Attendance: 23,952; Referee: Johan Verbist 34' Gillet; 92' Legear
22	13 Jan 2009	Belgian Cup	Seventh	A	Mechelen	1 – 2	Kick off: 20:45 CET; Referee: Johan Verbist 34' Rnić
23	16 Jan 2009	Jupiler League	18	H	Cercle Brugge	1 – 2	Kick off: 20:30 CET; Attendance: 23,296; Referee: Claude Bourdouxhe 24' Gillet
24	31 Jan 2009	Jupiler League	20	A	Kortrijk	3 – 1	Kick off: 20:00 CET; Attendance: 8,000; Referee: Jérôme Efong Nzolo 51' Vlček; 63' Juhász; 93' Boussoufa
25	7 Feb 2009	Jupiler League	21	H	Mons	3 – 2	Kick off: 20:00 CET; Attendance: 22,680; Referee: Bas Nijhuis 45' Bernárdez; 70' De Sutter; 81' Juhász
26	15 Feb 2009	Jupiler League	22	A	Charleroi	1 – 0	Kick off: 18:00 CET; Attendance: 13,349; Referee: Serge Gumienny; 81' Juhász
27	18 Feb 2009	Jupiler League	19	A	Gent	2 – 1	Kick off: 20:30 CET; Attendance: 12,919; Referee: Luc Wouters 11' De Sutter; 52' De Sutter
28	22 Feb 2009	Jupiler League	23	H	Standard Liège	4 – 2	Kick off: 20:30 CET; Attendance: 24,286; Referee: Paul Allaerts 45' Boussoufa; 61' Boussoufa; 69' (pen.) Wasilewski; 76' De Sutter
29	28 Feb 2009	Jupiler League	24	A	Mouscron	1 – 1	Kick off: 20:00 CET; Attendance: 8,179; Referee: Stéphane Breda 68' (pen.) Chatelle
30	7 Mar 2009	Jupiler League	25	H	Zulte Waregem	2 – 0	Kick off: 20:00 CET; Attendance: 23,585; Referee: Christof Virant 7' De Sutter; 28' Wasilewski
31	13 Mar 2009	Jupiler League	26	A	Mechelen	1 – 2	Kick off: 20:30 CET; Attendance: 12,800; Referee: Luc Wouters 76' De Sutter
32	21 Mar 2009	Jupiler League	27	H	Germinal Beerschot	2 – 0	Kick off: 20:00 CET; Attendance: 24,101; Referee: Claude Bourdouxhe 64' Wasilewski; 92' Suárez
33	5 Apr 2009	Jupiler League	28	A	Lokeren	0 – 0	Kick off: 20:30 CET; Attendance: 8,633; Referee: Jérôme Efong Nzolo
34	12 Apr 2009	Jupiler League	29	H	Club Brugge	1 – 0	Kick off: 20:30 CET; Attendance: 24,377; Referee: Serge Gumienny 23' Boussoufa
35	19 Apr 2009	Jupiler League	30	A	Westerlo	1 – 0	Kick off: 18:00 CET; Referee: Johan Verbist 53' De Sutter
36	25 Apr 2009	Jupiler League	31	H	Dender	4 – 0	Kick off: 20:00 CET; Referee: Alain Hamer 39' De Sutter; 41' Wasilewski; 43' De Sutter; 77' Chatelle
37	3 May 2009	Jupiler League	32	A	Tubize	1 – 1	Kick off: 20:30 CET; Referee: Paul Allaerts 94' Wasilewski
38	9 May 2009	Jupiler League	33	H	Roeselare	3 – 1	Kick off: 20:00 CET; Referee: Jérôme Efong Nzolo 13' Boussoufa; 48' Van Damme; 65' Biglia
39	16 May 2009	Jupiler League	34	A	Genk	2 – 0	Kick off: 20:00 CET; Referee: Johan Verbist 39' Boussoufa; 57' Wasilewski
40	21 May 2009	Jupiler League	Playoff	H	Standard Liège	1 – 1	Kick off: 20:30 CET; Referee: Johan Verbist 53' Legear
41	24 May 2009	Jupiler League	Playoff	A	Standard Liège	0 – 1	Kick off: 20:30 CET; Referee: Paul Allaerts

Last updated: 3 May 2009
Source: sporza.be
^{1}Anderlecht goals come first.
National flags for Ground and Opponent columns are only shown when different from that of Anderlecht.
M = Match; Ground: H = Home, A = Away, N = Neutral, HR = Home replacement, AR = Away replacement.

== See also ==
- List of R.S.C. Anderlecht seasons
