= 2002–03 KRC Genk season =

K.R.C. Genk
2002–03 season
- Manager: Sef Vergoossen
- Belgian First Division A: 6th
- Belgian Cup: Unknown
- UEFA Champions League: First group stage
- Top goalscorer: Wesley Sonck (22)

During the 2002–03 Belgian football season, K.R.C. Genk competed in the Belgian First Division.

== Season summary ==
Genk had a disappointing season and finished sixth, failing to qualify for any European competitions. They did accomplish the feat of making their debut in the Champions League group stages, but only picked up 4 points and finished bottom of their group.

== First-team squad ==
Squad at end of season:

Note: Flags indicate national team as defined under FIFA eligibility rules; some limited exceptions apply. Players may hold more than one non-FIFA nationality.

No.	Pos.	Nation	Player
1	GK	BEL	Jan Moons
2	DF	CRO	Igor Tomašić (Note: Tomašić was born in Kutina, Yugoslavia (now Croatia), but also qualified to represent Bulgaria internationally after obtaining citizenship and made his international debut for Bulgaria in August 2006.)
3	MF	GAM	Seyfo Soley
4	MF	CIV	Didier Zokora
5	DF	BEL	Wilfried Delbroek
6	MF	BIH	Mirsad Bešlija
7	DF	SVN	Almir Sulejmanović
8	FW	BEL	Wesley Sonck
9	FW	BFA	Moumouni Dagano
10	MF	AUS	Josip Skoko (captain)
11	FW	BEL	Kevin Vandenbergh
12	MF	BEL	Thomas Chatelle
13	DF	MAR	Akram Roumani
14	MF	BEL	Bernd Thijs
15	MF	BRA	Igor de Camargo (Note: De Camargo was born in Porto Feliz, Brazil, but would later qualify to represent Belgium internationally after obtaining citizenship and made his international debut for Belgium in February 2009.)

No.	Pos.	Nation	Player
15	DF	BEL	Muhammet Hanifi Yoldaş (Note: Hanifi Yoldaş was born in Diest, Belgium, but also qualified represent Turkey internationally and would represent them at U-21 and B level.)
16	MF	SVN	Dominik Beršnjak
17	DF	BEL	Hans Leenders
18	DF	BEL	Kevin Vanbeuren
20	MF	BEL	Koen Daerden
22	MF	CMR	Justice Wamfor
23	DF	BEL	Vincent Euvrard
24	MF	BEL	Kenneth Van Goethem
25	DF	ITA	Marco Ingrao
26	GK	BEL	Davy Schollen
27	GK	BEL	Logan Bailly
28	MF	BEL	Sidi Farssi
30	FW	JPN	Takayuki Suzuki (on loan from Kashima Antlers)
31	DF	BEL	Mike Mampuya] (Note: Mampuya was born in Verviers, Belgium, but also qualifies to represent DR Congo internationally and would make his international debut for DR Congo in February 2011.)

== Results ==
=== UEFA Champions League ===
==== Third qualifying round ====
13 August 2002	Genk (Belgium)	2–0	(Czech Republic) Sparta Prague	Fenix Stadion, Genk
20:00	Thijs 33'; Bešlija 40'	Report		Attendance: 9,969; Referee: Kim Milton Nielsen (Denmark)

27 August 2002	Sparta Prague (Czech Republic)	4–2	(Belgium) Genk	Letná Stadium, Prague
20:30	Poborský 56'; Jarošík 58', 64'; Mareš 84'	Report	Dagano 25'; Sonck 57'	Attendance: 12,856; Referee: Kyros Vassaras (Greece)

Genk 4–4 Sparta Prague on aggregate. Genk won on away goals.

==== Group stage ====
17 September 2002	Genk (Belgium)	0–0	(Greece) AEK Athens	Cristal Arena, Genk
20:45		Report		Attendance: 22,000; Referee: Konrad Plautz (Austria)

25 September 2002	Real Madrid (Spain)	6–0	(Belgium) Genk	Santiago Bernabéu Stadium, Madrid
20:45	Zokora 44' (o.g.); Salgado 45+1'; Figo 55'; Guti 64'; Celades 74'; Raúl 76'	Report		Attendance: 65,700; Referee: Knud Erik Fisker (Denmark)

2 October 2002	Genk (Belgium)	0–1	(Italy) Roma	Cristal Arena, Genk
20:45		Report	Cassano 81'	Attendance: 22,260; Referee: Alain Sars (France)

22 October 2002	Roma (Italy)	0–0	(Belgium) Genk	Stadio Olimpico, Rome
20:45		Report		Attendance: 25,592; Referee: Željko Širić (FR Yugoslavia)

30 October 2002	AEK Athens (Greece)	1–1	(Belgium) Genk	Nikos Goumas Stadium, Athens
20:45	Lakis 30'	Report	Sonck 22'	Attendance: 19,775; Referee: Massimo Busacca (Switzerland)

12 November 2002	Genk (Belgium)	1–1	(Spain) Real Madrid	Cristal Arena, Genk
20:45	Sonck 86'	Report	Tote 21'	Attendance: 22,260; Referee: Jacek Granat (Poland)
