= Servaes =

Servaes can refer to:

- Albert Servaes (1883–1966), Belgian expressionist painter
- Dagny Servaes (1894–1961), German-Austrian stage and film actress
- Gil Servaes (born 1988), Belgian football player
- Michiel Servaes (1972), Dutch politician
- Reginald Servaes (1893-1978), vice admiral of the British Royal Navy
- Servaes de Koninck (1653/4 – c.1701), baroque composer from the Netherlands
