= Romelu Lukaku =

Belgian footballer (born 1993)

- Lukaku with Belgium in 2026

Personal information
- Full name: Romelu Lukaku Bolingoli
- Date of birth: 13 May 1993 (age 33)
- Place of birth: Antwerp, Belgium
- Height: 1.91 m (6 ft 3 in)
- Position: Striker

Team information
- Current team: Fenerbahçe
- Number: 9

Youth career
- 1999–2003: Rupel Boom
- 2003–2004: KFC Wintam
- 2004–2006: Lierse
- 2006–2009: Anderlecht

Senior career*
Years	Team	Apps	(Gls)
2009–2011	Anderlecht	73	(33)
2011–2014	Chelsea	10	(0)
2012–2013	→ West Bromwich Albion (loan)	35	(17)
2013–2014	→ Everton (loan)	31	(15)
2013–2017	Everton	110	(53)
2017–2019	Manchester United	66	(28)
2019–2021	Inter Milan	72	(47)
2021–2024	Chelsea	26	(8)
2022–2023	→ Inter Milan (loan)	25	(10)
2023–2024	→ Roma (loan)	32	(13)
2024–2026	Napoli	41	(15)
2026–	Fenerbahçe	11	(1)

International career
2008	Belgium U15	4	(1)
2011	Belgium U18	1	(0)
2009	Belgium U21	5	(1)
2010–2026	Belgium	135	(94)
Medal record
Men's football
Representing Belgium
FIFA World Cup
Third place	2018 Russia
- * Club domestic league appearances and goals as of 17:00, 21 November 2026 (UTC)

Romelu Lukaku Bolingoli (Dutch pronunciation: [ˈroːmeːlu luˈkaːku]; born 13 May 1993) is a Belgian professional footballer who plays as a striker for Süper Lig club Fenerbahçe. Widely considered as one of the best Belgian forwards of all time, he currently ranks second for the all-time European men's top goalscorers in international football, with 94 goals for the Belgium national team between 2010 and 2026.

Lukaku began his senior club career playing for Anderlecht, where he won a Belgian Pro League title and finished as the league's top goalscorer. In 2011, he joined Chelsea, but limited playing time resulted in loans to West Bromwich Albion and Everton. In 2014, Lukaku signed with Everton in a permanent deal. In the 2016–17 Premier League season, he scored 25 goals and was named in the PFA Team of the Year. In 2017, he signed with Manchester United, where he scored his 100th Premier League goal and featured in the 2018 FA Cup final.

In 2019, following a disappointing second season with United, Lukaku departed for Inter Milan. In his debut season, he helped Inter reach the UEFA Europa League final and was named the competition's Player of the Season. In the following season, he led them to their first Serie A title in eleven years and was awarded both the league's Most Valuable Player and Footballer of the Year. In 2021, Lukaku returned to Chelsea in a club-record transfer worth £97.5 million (€115 million). However, after just one season, he was sent out on loan back to Italy to Inter and Roma, before joining Napoli on a permanent deal in 2024. Lukaku was Napoli's top goalscorer en route to winning the 2024–25 Serie A title, and was named in the league's Team of the Season.

Belgium's all-time top goalscorer, Lukaku made his senior international debut for the country in 2010, and represented Belgium at seven major tournaments: the 2016, 2020, and 2024 UEFA European Championships, and the 2014, 2018, 2022, and 2026 FIFA World Cups; he finished as joint second-highest goalscorer to win the World Cup Bronze Boot in 2018, and was named in the European Championship Team of the Tournament in 2020. A member of his nation's "golden generation", he helped Belgium finish in third place at the 2018 World Cup, their best-ever result at the tournament.

== Club career ==
=== Early career ===
Lukaku joined his local team Rupel Boom at age five. After four seasons at Rupel Boom, Lukaku was discovered by scouts of Lierse, a Belgian Pro League club with an established youth academy. He played for Lierse from 2004 until 2006, scoring 121 goals in 68 matches. After Lierse were relegated from the Belgian Pro League, Anderlecht purchased 13 youth players from Lierse in the 2006 mid-season, including Lukaku. He played three more years as a youth player with Anderlecht, scoring 131 goals in 93 matches.

=== Anderlecht ===
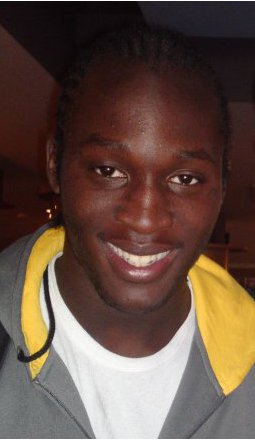
Lukaku in 2010

When Lukaku turned 16 on 13 May 2009, he signed a professional contract with Anderlecht lasting until 2012. Eleven days later, he made his Belgian First Division debut on 24 May 2009 in the championship play-off match against Standard Liège as a 69th-minute substitute for defender Víctor Bernárdez. Anderlecht lost the match 1–0. Lukaku became a regular member of Anderlecht's first team during the 2009–10 season, scoring his first goal at senior level against Zulte Waregem in the 89th minute after coming on as substitute for Kanu on 28 August 2009. "After scoring I dived into a sea of happiness", he told Berend Scholten from UEFA.com. "You think you are flying and can take on the whole world". He ended the season as the top goalscorer in the Pro League with 15 goals as Anderlecht won its 30th Belgian title. He also scored four goals during the club's run to the last 16 of the 2009–10 UEFA Europa League. During the 2010–11 season, Lukaku scored 20 goals in all competitions, but Anderlecht failed to retain their league title despite finishing top of the table during the regular season.

=== Chelsea ===
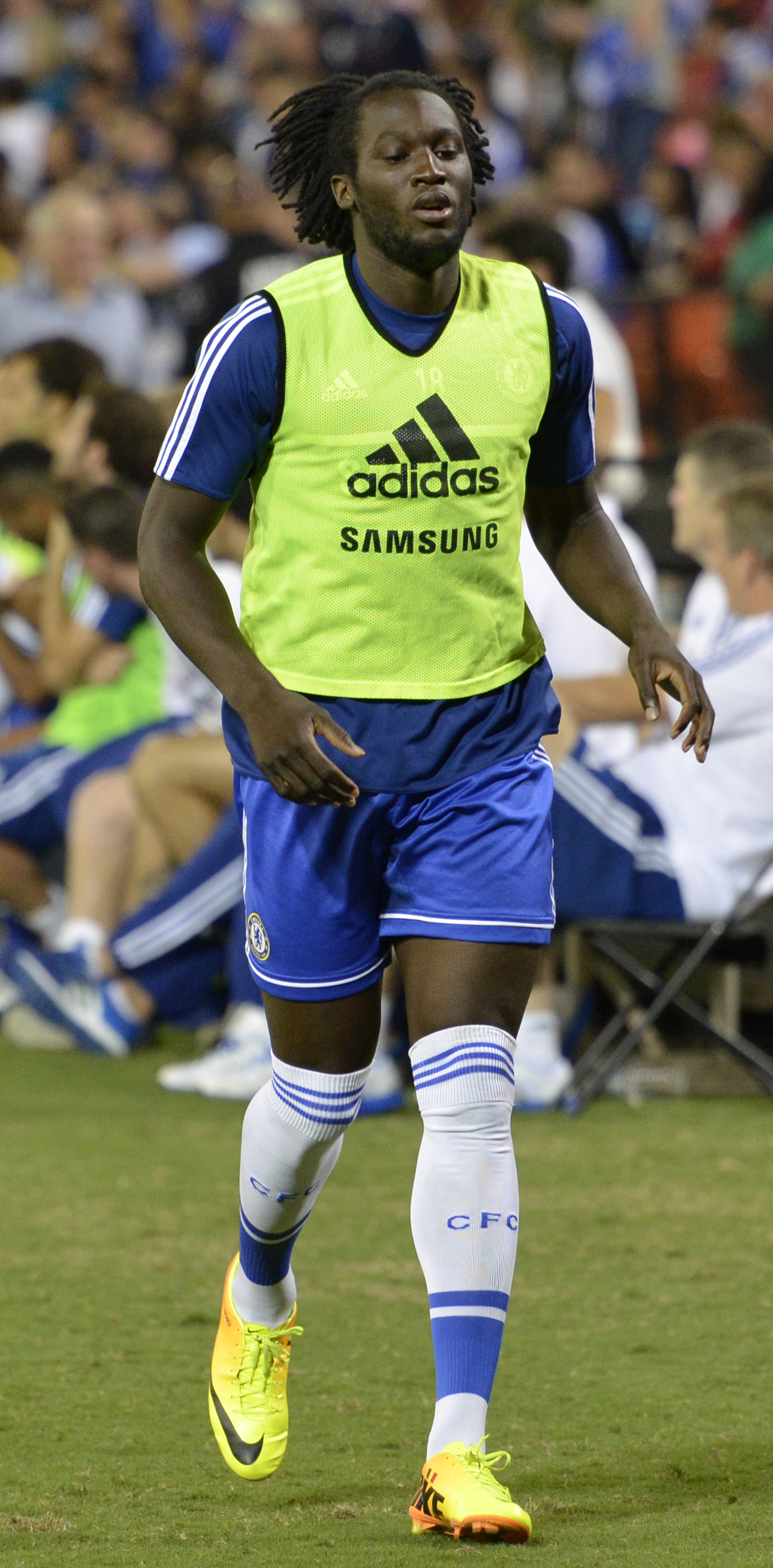
Lukaku warming up for Chelsea in 2013

==== Transfer ====
In August 2011, Lukaku joined Premier League club Chelsea on a five-year contract for a fee reported to be around €12 million (£10 million), rising to €20 million (£17 million) in add-ons.

==== 2011–12: Debut season ====
Lukaku made his debut at Stamford Bridge in a 3–1 victory over Norwich City in the 83rd minute, coming on as a substitute for Fernando Torres. Lukaku made his first start for Chelsea in the League Cup against Fulham. Chelsea went on to win the match on penalties. He spent the majority of the season playing for the reserves and started his first Premier League match on 13 May 2012, against Blackburn Rovers, and turned in a man of the match performance, providing an assist for John Terry's opener. However, Lukaku stressed he was disappointed with his involvement at the end of his debut season, revealing that, after his side's UEFA Champions League win in the final on 19 May, he refused to hold the trophy, explaining "it wasn't me, but my team that won".

==== 2012–13: Loan to West Bromwich Albion ====
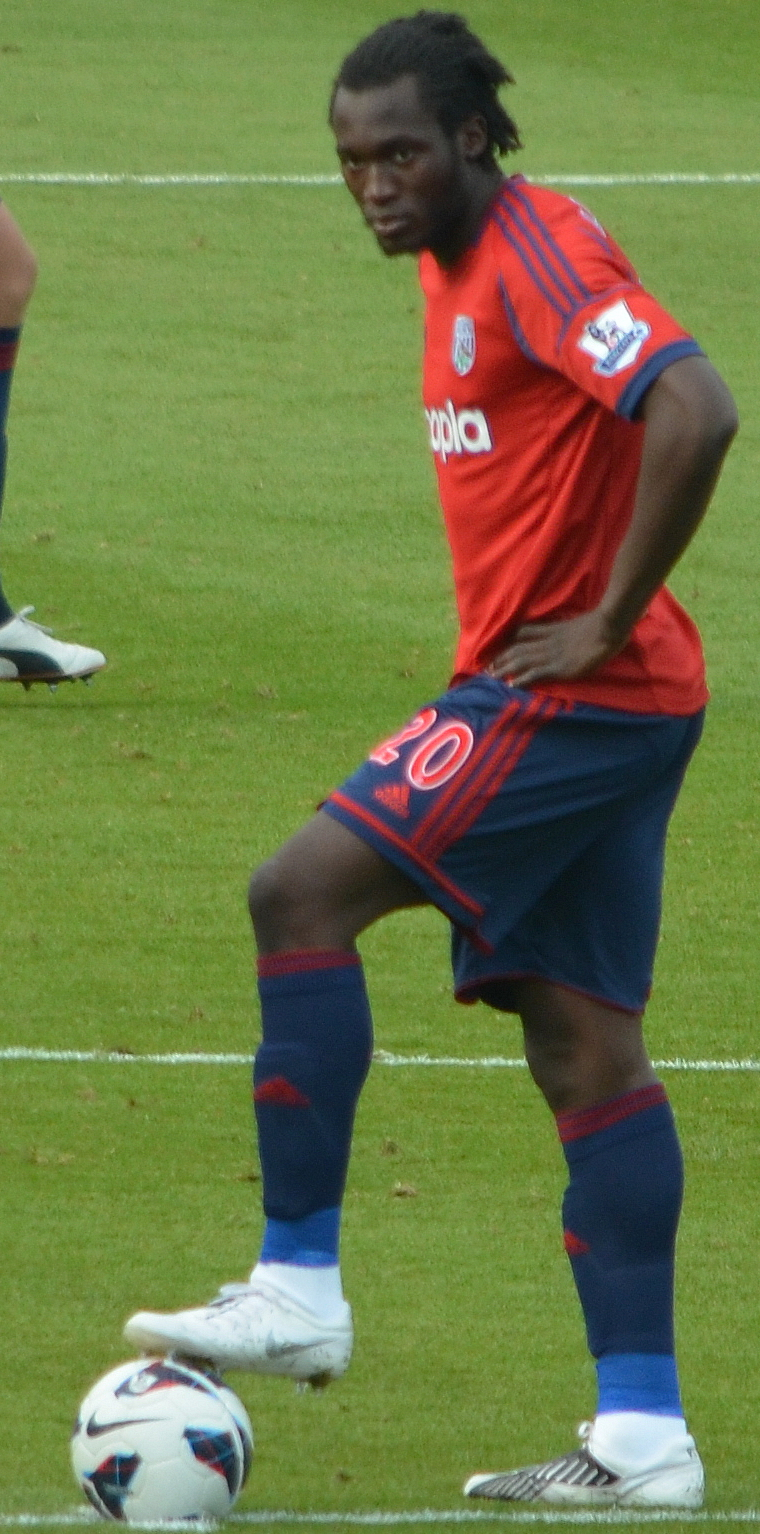
Lukaku playing for West Bromwich Albion in 2012

After speculation linking Lukaku with a loan move to Fulham, on 10 August 2012, he joined West Bromwich Albion on a season-long loan deal. He scored his first league goal eight days later, coming on as a substitute in the 77th minute in a 3–0 win against Liverpool. He made his full debut in a win against Reading at The Hawthorns, scoring the match's only goal. On 24 November, Lukaku came on as a 70th-minute substitute for Shane Long and netted a penalty and provided an assist to Marc-Antoine Fortuné, as West Brom defeated Sunderland 4–2 away at the Stadium of Light. The win proved to be West Brom's fourth consecutive win in the top flight for the first time since 1980. On 12 January 2013, Lukaku had his first multi-goal game in the Premier League, giving West Brom a 2–0 lead against Reading, before a late comeback gave the Berkshire club a 3–2 victory at the Madejski Stadium. In the face of claims he wanted to stay with West Brom for another year, Lukaku confirmed to the press he still wished to become a legend at Stamford Bridge. On 11 February, Lukaku came on as a substitute and scored his tenth Premier League goal of the season against Liverpool in a match that ended 2–0.

He scored his second brace of the campaign, scoring both goals for West Brom in their 2–1 home defeat of Sunderland on 23 February. On 9 March, in a league match against Swansea City, Lukaku scored the equalising goal before having a penalty kick saved; West Brom eventually won the game courtesy of a Jonathan de Guzmán own goal. On 19 May, coming on as a second-half substitute, Lukaku scored a remarkable second-half perfect hat-trick, as West Brom came from three goals down to draw 5–5 in the season's final home match against Manchester United. The match was Alex Ferguson's 1,500th and last match in charge of United, and the highest-scoring draw in the history of the Premier League. Despite being loaned out by the club, Lukaku outscored all of his Chelsea teammates in the Premier League that season, being the sixth-highest goalscorer of the 2012–13 season with 17 goals. Lukaku played two Premier League matches for Chelsea at the beginning of the 2013–14 season. He also came on as a substitute in the 2013 UEFA Super Cup, ultimately missing the deciding penalty in the shootout, as Manuel Neuer saved his shot and Chelsea lost to Bayern Munich.

==== 2013–14: Loan to Everton ====
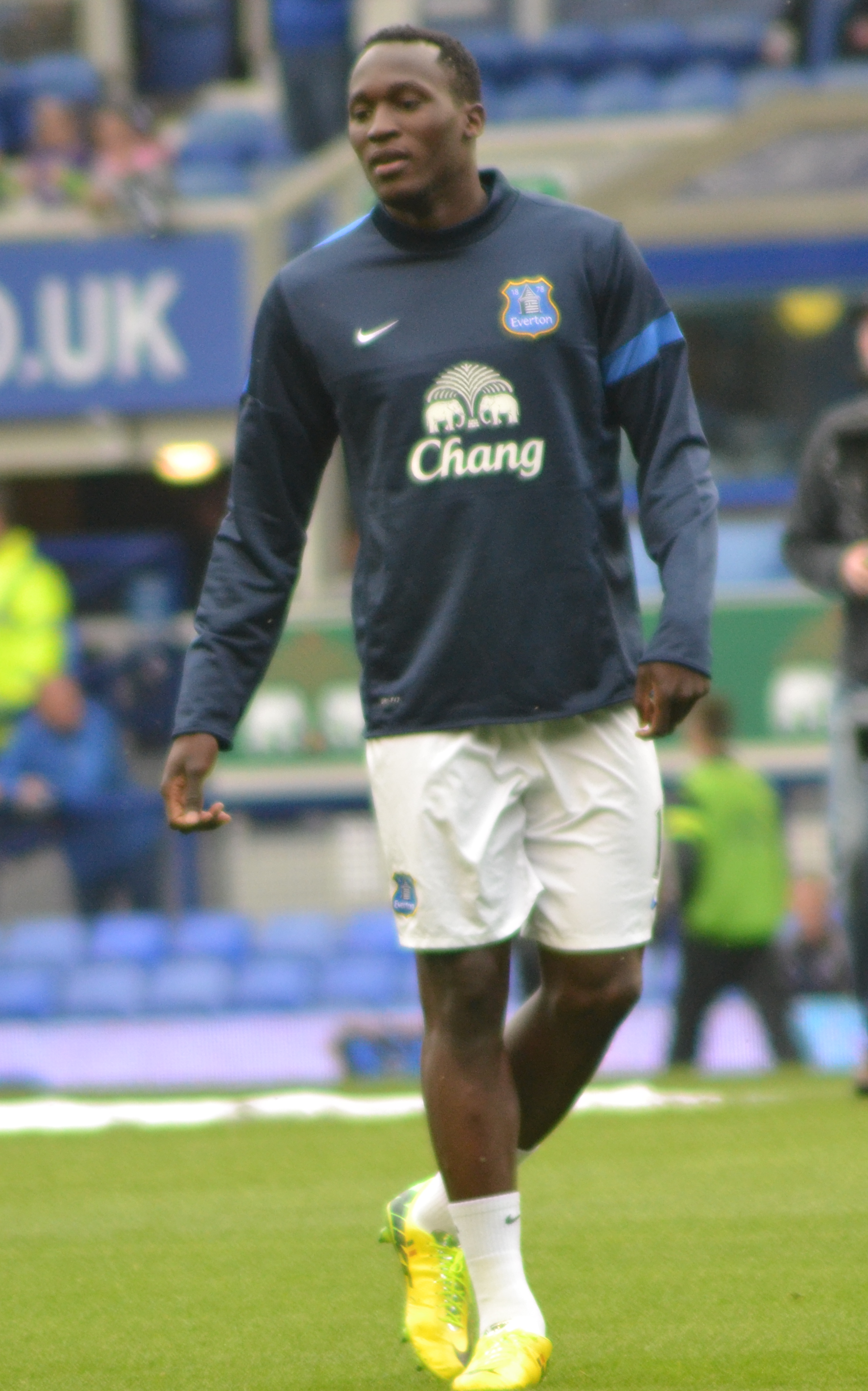
Lukaku training with Everton in 2014

On the final day of the summer 2013 transfer window, Lukaku joined Everton on a season-long loan. The striker made his début for the Toffees away to West Ham United on 21 September 2013, scoring the winning goal in a 3–2 victory for Everton. During the header, he had a collision with a West Ham defender and was taken off the pitch for some treatment. The physio had to tell him he had scored the winner. He scored twice on his home debut nine days later in a 3–2 win against Newcastle United, as well assisting Ross Barkley's goal. He then opened the scoring in a 3–1 defeat to Manchester City in the following match. He continued his impressive start at the club by netting the opening goal in a 2–0 win over Aston Villa, and then scored twice in the first Merseyside derby of the season, as Everton drew 3–3 against Liverpool, with Lukaku stating afterwards it was the best experience he had had in his short career.

In January 2014, Lukaku was named by The Guardian as one of the ten most promising young players in Europe, but later in the month was taken off on a stretcher with an ankle ligament injury after Gareth Barry slipped and slid into the striker, as he attempted to block Steven Gerrard's opening goal in the Merseyside derby against Liverpool. Lukaku made his return from injury against West Ham in March 2014, scoring the only goal of the match on the 81st minute after coming on as a second-half substitute. On 6 April, he scored one goal and assisted another as Everton beat Arsenal 3–0 at Goodison Park to record a sixth consecutive Premier League win. His final goal for the loan period came on the last day of the season as he scored the second in a 2–0 win over Hull City. Lukaku found the net 15 times in 31 league matches to help Everton to fifth place, with a club record of 72 Premier League points.

=== Everton ===
==== 2014–16: Rise to stardom ====
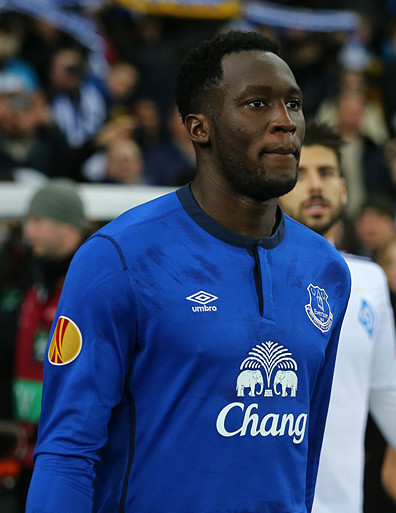
Lukaku with Everton in 2015

Lukaku signed a five-year contract with Everton in July 2014 for a then-club record fee of £28 million. He scored his first goal as a permanent player on 13 September, against his former club West Brom. Lukaku did not celebrate the goal, and was applauded by the West Brom fans for his sign of respect. On 19 February 2015, Lukaku scored his first hat-trick in a 4–1 win for Everton against Young Boys in the UEFA Europa League last 32; he struck with a header, a right-foot shot and a left-foot shot. He added another two goals in a 3–1 win in the second leg a week later. With eight goals, he was the tournament's joint highest scorer that season, alongside Alan of Red Bull Salzburg.

In the second game of the 2015–16 Premier League season, Lukaku scored a first-half double in Everton's 3–0 win at Southampton on 15 August 2015 with his first two shots on target. Before the match, he presented a t-shirt to a home fan whom he had accidentally struck with the ball during shooting practice. On 26 August, he scored another brace in a 5–3 extra-time win over League One side Barnsley in the League Cup. On 28 September, Lukaku scored twice and assisted the other against West Brom as he managed to guide his team from losing 2–0 to winning 2–3. He scored against Liverpool the following week in a 1–1 draw at Goodison Park. On 21 November, Lukaku scored twice in a 4–0 win over Aston Villa, becoming the fifth player under 23 years of age to score at least fifty Premier League goals, after Robbie Fowler, Michael Owen, Wayne Rooney and Cristiano Ronaldo. On 7 December, Lukaku scored a close-range goal in a 1–1 draw against Crystal Palace, his 50th in 100 appearances in all competitions for Everton. On 12 December, Lukaku became the first Everton player to score in six consecutive Premier League matches, and the first to score in seven consecutive matches in all competitions since Bob Latchford forty years previously, when he opened the scoring in the Toffees' 1–1 draw with Norwich City at Carrow Road. In his next match, a 3–2 defeat to Leicester City, Lukaku became the first Everton player since Dave Hickson in 1954 to score in eight consecutive matches.

On 6 February 2016, Lukaku scored his 20th goal of the season in a 3–0 victory at Stoke City, meaning he was the first Everton player since Graeme Sharp to score at least twenty goals in all competitions in consecutive seasons for Everton. The strike was also his 16th league goal of the season, equalling Premier League goal scoring records for Everton set by Tony Cottee and Andrei Kanchelskis in the mid-1990s. Lukaku followed this goal with another strike in a 2–0 victory at Bournemouth's Dean Court for his 21st goal of the season. This victory sent Everton into the quarter-finals of the FA Cup, and equalled the number of goals scored in all competitions by Yakubu for Everton in the 2007–08 season, the previous best in the Premier League era. On 1 March, Lukaku scored in a 3–1 victory against Aston Villa at Villa Park, his 17th league goal of the season, a Premier League-era record for Everton. The goal also meant Lukaku had equalled his previous best goal return in a league season, set during his loan spell at West Brom in the 2012–13 season.

==== 2016–17: Sustained individual success ====
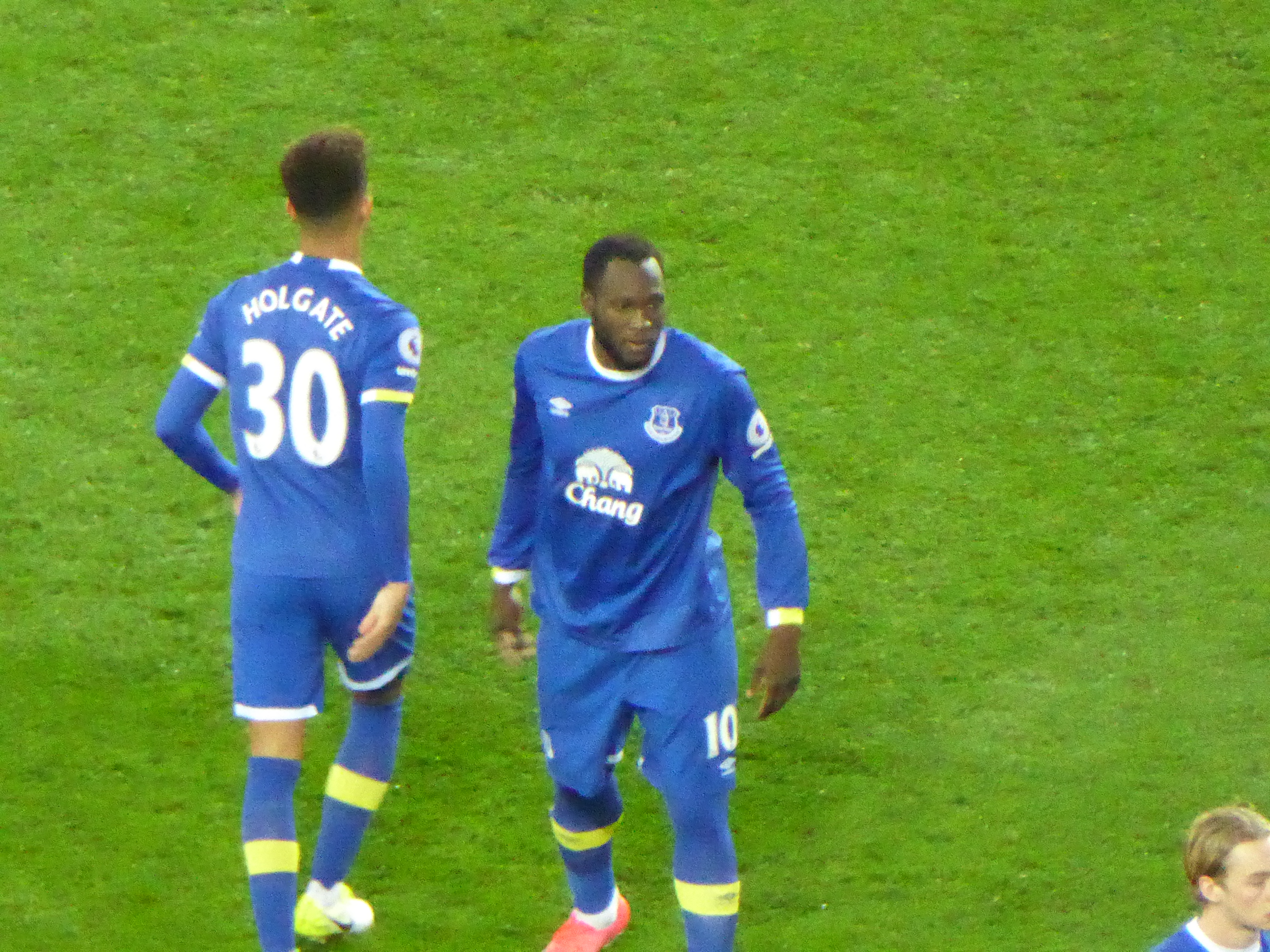
Lukaku (right) playing for Everton in 2017

On 12 September 2016, Lukaku scored his first goals of the 2016–17 season with all three goals in a 3–0 against Sunderland at the Stadium of Light. His goals were scored in 11 minutes and 37 seconds, making it the 12th-fastest hat-trick in Premier League history. On 4 February 2017, Lukaku scored four goals, the first of which was Everton's fastest ever Premier League goal, against Bournemouth in a 6–3 victory at Goodison Park. It was also the 300th hat-trick scored in the Premier League. On 25 February 2017, he equalled Duncan Ferguson's club record for Premier League goals, scoring his 60th EPL goal for the Toffees in a 2–0 victory over Sunderland at Goodison Park. On 5 March, he surpassed Ferguson to become the outright record holder, scoring in a 3–2 loss against Tottenham Hotspur away at White Hart Lane. In the next match, a 3–0 home win against West Brom, Lukaku scored to become the first Everton player since Bob Latchford to score 20 or more goals in all competitions for three consecutive seasons. A week later, during a 4–0 victory over Hull City, he scored twice to take his league goals tally to 21 for the season, thereby becoming the first Everton player since Gary Lineker 31 years previously to surpass 20 league goals in a season, as well as being the fourth player and first foreign player to score 80 Premier League goals before the age of 24.

In March 2017, Lukaku turned down a new five-year contract worth a reported £140,000 a week amidst rumours of a return to Chelsea. In an interview, he questioned the club's ambition to make big transfers and chase Champions League qualification, offending his manager Ronald Koeman. A goal in a 3–1 win for Everton against Burnley on 15 April meant Lukaku was the first Everton player since Bob Latchford to score 25 goals in two consecutive seasons in all competitions, and the first player since the legendary Dixie Dean to score in nine consecutive matches at Goodison Park. On 20 April 2017, Lukaku was named in the PFA Team of the Year for the first time. He was also included in the six player shortlists for the PFA Players' Player of the Year and PFA Young Player of the Year awards.

=== Manchester United ===
==== Transfer ====
Lukaku joined Manchester United on 10 July 2017, signing a five-year contract, with the option of a further year. Although the fee was officially undisclosed, it was reported to be worth an initial £75 million, plus £15 million in add-ons. Thus, he became a teammate with his French-speaking close friend Paul Pogba. Lukaku's signing came a day after former Manchester United captain Wayne Rooney left the club to return to Everton, Rooney's boyhood club.

==== 2017–18: Debut season and drop in form ====
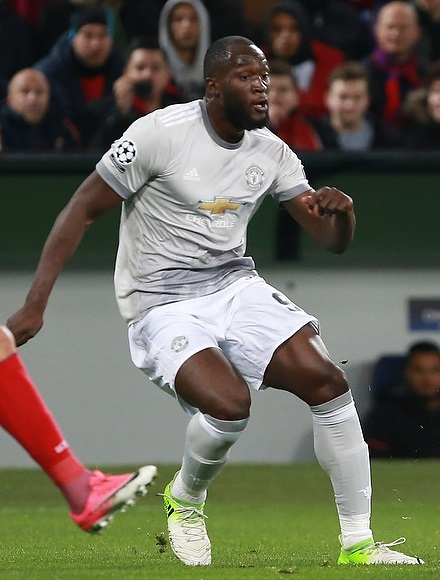
Lukaku playing for Manchester United in 2017

Lukaku made his debut against Real Madrid on 8 August in the 2017 UEFA Super Cup, and scored his first competitive goal for the club in the 2–1 defeat. His league debut came five days later at home to West Ham. Lukaku scored twice in a 4–0 win, becoming the fourth Manchester United player to score two goals on his Premier League debut for the club. On 12 September, he scored his first UEFA Champions League goal in a 3–0 win over Basel. On 17 September, Lukaku scored United's third goal in a 4–0 win over his former club Everton, with Lukaku running over towards Everton fans and cupping his ears during his goal celebration in response to being booed throughout the game.

On 27 September, Lukaku scored twice in a 4–1 win over CSKA Moscow, taking his tally to ten goals in his first nine appearances. In doing so, he broke the record set by Bobby Charlton, who had scored nine goals in his first nine appearances for the club. In a 2–1 win over his former club Chelsea on 25 February 2018, Lukaku scored the equaliser and then assisted Jesse Lingard's game-winning goal. He scored his 200th goal for club and country on 13 March in a 2–1 away defeat to Sevilla that eliminated Manchester United from the Champions League in the round of 16. On 31 March 2018, Lukaku scored to open a 2–0 home win over Swansea. It was his 100th Premier League goal in his 216th game, and made him the fifth youngest of the 28 players to reach the tally.

==== 2018–19: Final season in Manchester ====
Lukaku started the 2018–19 season with four goals in his first five appearances, including a brace against Burnley, before a 12-game drought lasting from 19 September to 27 November 2018. Goals against Southampton and Fulham followed before the sacking of manager José Mourinho, only for Mourinho's replacement – former United striker Ole Gunnar Solskjær – to leave Lukaku out of the squad entirely for his first two games in charge against Cardiff City and Huddersfield Town. Lukaku made substitute appearances in United's next two games against Bournemouth and Newcastle United, scoring in both matches within two minutes of coming on. He then played the full 90 minutes of the FA Cup third round tie against Reading, scoring the second goal in a 2–0 win. However, Solskjær continued to prefer to start Marcus Rashford up front, and Lukaku started just five of the next nine games, playing the full 90 minutes in just two and failing to score in any of them. His goalscoring form returned for the next three games, as he scored braces against each of Crystal Palace, Southampton and Paris Saint-Germain. The goals against PSG were part of a 3–1 win that saw United through to the Champions League quarter-finals on the away goals rule, the first time any team had progressed after losing at home in the first leg by two goals or more. However, United were eliminated by Barcelona in the quarter-finals 4–0 on aggregate.

=== Inter Milan ===
==== 2019–20: Club record transfer and Europa League runner-up ====
Lukaku joined Italian club Inter Milan on 8 August 2019, signing a five-year contract for a fee reported to be a club record €80 million. He later mentioned the reasons for leaving Manchester United, by claiming that he was made a scapegoat alongside other players, such as Paul Pogba and Alexis Sánchez, in addition to club's failure to protect him against rumours about his future. Lukaku made his debut for Inter on 26 August in the opening Serie A matchday against Lecce, netting his side's third goal with his first shot in a 4–0 home win. The goal meant that Lukaku has found the net in his first league game for five of the six clubs he has represented: Anderlecht, West Brom, Everton, Manchester United and Inter; he also become only the third Belgian to score for Inter in Serie A, after Enzo Scifo and Radja Nainggolan. In the club's second league game of the season at Cagliari on 1 September, Lukaku scored the match-winning goal from the penalty spot to give Inter a 2–1 victory away from home; however, he was subject to racial abuse from some of the Cagliari fans.

In the first months since his arrival, Lukaku formed an attacking partnership with Argentine youngster Lautaro Martínez, dubbed "Lu-La" by Italian media. This came after the duo scored a brace each in the 4–3 away win against Sassuolo in October, giving Inter their first triumph there since 2016. On 2 November, Lukaku scored a brace in a 2–1 away win over Bologna in Serie A, which saw him match Ronaldo's record of nine goals in his first eleven league appearances for the club. On 27 November, Lukaku scored his first UEFA Champions League goal for Inter, in a 3–1 away win against Slavia Prague in the group stage; in addition to that, he also assisted the two other goals scored by Martínez, and had two goals disallowed himself. In the final match at home against Barcelona, Lukaku scored his side's only goal in a 2–1 defeat, meaning that Inter transferred to Europa League for the second season in a row.

He began the new year on 6 January by scoring a brace in a 3–1 win against Napoli, giving Inter their first league win at Stadio San Paolo since October 1997; he earned praise from the media for his first goal scored in the 14th minute, which came from an individual effort. On 9 February, Lukaku scored the final goal of the 4–2 home win over cross-town rivals Milan, sending Inter to the top of the table and giving them another double over Milan; it was also his 17th league goal of the season.

On 25 July, Lukaku scored a brace in a 3–0 win at Genoa; in doing so, he became the first Inter player since István Nyers in the 1949–50 season to score 15 away goals in a Serie A season, and the first do to so in his debut season. He concluded his first Serie A season with 23 goals, as Inter finished runner-up by just one point to Juventus in the standings; only Ronaldo (25) and Nyers (26) have scored more than him in their debut season at Inter. On 5 August, Lukaku scored in a 2–0 win over Getafe in the Europa League's round of 16, helping his side reach the quarter-finals of a European competition for the first time since 2011. It was his 30th goal in all competitions, a new personal best, and he had also scored for the eighth consecutive Europa League match, equalling the all-time record set by Alan Shearer in 2004–05. In the quarter-finals on 10 August, he broke this record, scoring in his ninth consecutive match in the competition in a 2–1 victory over Bayer Leverkusen in Düsseldorf, to send Inter into the semi-finals. On 17 August, Lukaku scored a brace in a 5–0 win against Shakhtar Donetsk — his tenth consecutive match in the competition — as Inter reached the final. In the final, he earned and scored a penalty in the fifth minute, but also scored an own goal in the 74th minute, which was eventually the winning goal for Sevilla in a 3–2 defeat. Lukaku equalled Ronaldo's record in 1997–98 season, by scoring 34 goals in all competitions.

==== 2020–21: Serie A champion ====
On 21 October 2020, Lukaku scored a brace in a 2–2 draw against Borussia Mönchengladbach in the first match of the 2020–21 UEFA Champions League. On 1 December, he scored another brace against Mönchengladbach to secure a 3–2 away win. However, Inter drew their last match against Shakhtar Donetsk, to finish last in their group, and were eliminated from all European competitions.

On 3 January 2021, Lukaku scored in a 6–2 win over Crotone, to reach his 50th goal across all competitions in only 70 matches, breaking the previous record of Ronaldo who scored fifty goals in 77 matches. On 26 January, Lukaku was involved in a confrontation with former Manchester United teammate Zlatan Ibrahimović in Inter's Coppa Italia quarter-final match against Milan. Following a foul committed by Lukaku late in the first half, he and Ibrahimović could be heard exchanging insults as the pair clashed heads, and had to be restrained by their respective teammates. Both players were booked as their arguments continued into the tunnel at half-time. Ibrahimović would be sent off during the second half following a second yellow for a foul on Aleksandar Kolarov, as Inter went on to record a 2–1 victory.

On 14 February, he scored a brace and got an assist against Lazio in a 3–1 victory, bringing his Serie A tally to 16 goals for the season, and equalling Cristiano Ronaldo as the league's top scorer. Lukaku's second goal was also the 300th of his professional career. Inter won the 2020–21 Serie A for the first time since the 2009–10 season. Lukaku finished the season 2020–21 with 24 league goals, eleven assists - making him the top scorer on the title-winning team and the second top-scorer in the league, behind Ronaldo.

=== Return to Chelsea ===
==== 2021–22: FIFA Club World Cup champion and loss of form ====
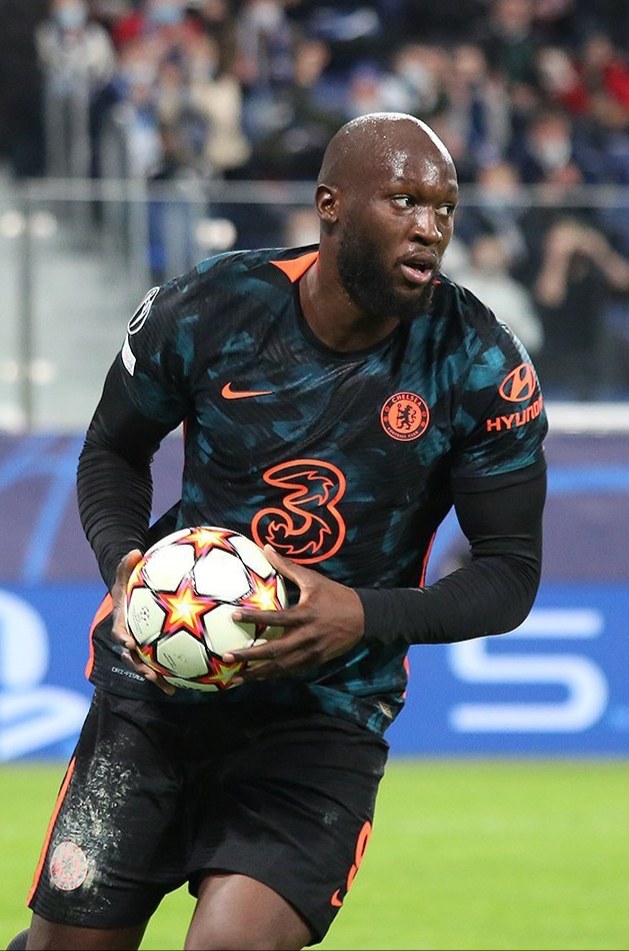
Lukaku playing for Chelsea in 2021

On 12 August 2021, Lukaku returned to his former club Chelsea on a five-year deal, a decade after he had originally joined the club, for a reported club record fee of £97.5 million. In making the move, Lukaku became the most expensive player of all time, with cumulative transfer fees of almost £285 million, surpassing Neymar. Lukaku admitted in an interview that he did request Inter to reach to an agreement with Chelsea, stating: "I didn't want to go behind Inter's back. They got me out of the shit. I was in a deep hole at Manchester United. After training I went to [head coach Simone] Inzaghi's office. I didn't want to ruin the atmosphere because I was no longer with my head in Milan. So I asked him: please find an agreement."

On 22 August, Lukaku scored on his second debut in the 15th minute, converting Reece James' cross, in a 2–0 away win over Arsenal. On 12 September, Lukaku scored twice at home against Aston Villa, the first time he had scored at Stamford Bridge. Two days later, Lukaku scored his first European goal for Chelsea, against Zenit in the Champions League. On 8 October, Lukaku was one of five Chelsea players included in the final 30-man shortlist for the 2021 Ballon d'Or, eventually finishing twelfth.

In late December, Lukaku stoked controversy when during an interview with Sky Italia, he reported being "not happy" with the situation at Chelsea, and that head coach Thomas Tuchel "has chosen to play with another system", comparing the teams tactics with that at Inter. In the same interview, he went on to express his wish to return to Inter "in the near future". Consequently, Tuchel dropped him from the squad altogether for a match against title challengers Liverpool, which ended 2–2. After then holding talks with Tuchel, Lukaku issued an apology, saying: "I'm sorry for the upset I have caused", and stated that he "wanted to move forward". He was restored to the first team and started in the first leg of the EFL Cup semi-final win against Tottenham Hotspur, but was fined for his comments. Lukaku finished the season having scored eight goals in 26 league games; he was judged by ESPN to be the worst signing of the Premier League season.

==== 2022–23: Return to Inter Milan on loan and Champions League runner-up ====
On 29 June 2022, Chelsea announced that Lukaku would return to Inter for a season-long loan for the 2022–23 campaign. It was reported that they had agreed to pay a loan fee of approximately €8 million (£6.9 million), and that Lukaku took a pay cut. He would choose to wear the number 90 shirt, due to number 9 being already used by Edin Džeko. On 13 August, he scored his first goal since his return to the Nerazzurri in a 2–1 win over Lecce.

After various injuries in the first months of the season, Lukaku made his first start for Inter in a 1–0 over championship leaders Napoli, giving them their first league defeat for the 2022–23 season. Fourteen days later, despite featuring on the bench, following a 3–0 win over Milan, he won the 2022 Supercoppa Italiana. On 22 February, in the first leg of Champions League round-of-16, he scored the only goal of a home win over Porto, which led Inter to advance to quarter-finals, after securing an away draw in Porto. He would start to regain his form on the latter months of the season, netting six goals in six appearances between April and May. On 5 April, he urged Serie A to take action, after he was racially abused during a Coppa Italia draw at Juventus. On 24 May, he won his first Coppa Italia, as Inter defeated Fiorentina 2–1 in the final. On 10 June, he played in the 2023 Champions League final against Manchester City, but he was criticized for his performance in the game, missing a number of key chances after coming off the bench during the second half, as his side suffered a 1–0 defeat.

==== 2023–24: Loan to Roma ====
During the summer of 2023, Lukaku was reportedly negotiating with Inter Milan rivals Juventus for a possible move, enraging many Inter and Juventus fans. However, on 31 August 2023, Lukaku was sent to another Serie A club, Roma, on a season-long loan deal for a reported fee in the region of £8 million (€9.3 million), with the club covering the whole of the player's salary. Lukaku also reportedly agreed to a new contract at Chelsea, which included a wage cut to the remainder of his contract and a release clause of £37 million. On 1 September, he made his debut for Roma at Stadio Olimpico, coming off the bench in a 2–1 defeat against Milan. On 17 September, he scored his first goal in a 7–0 win over Empoli.

=== Napoli ===
On 29 August 2024, Lukaku permanently transferred to Serie A club Napoli for a fee reportedly worth €30 million. On his debut for the club two days later, he scored an equaliser in stoppage time of an eventual 2–1 win over Parma. On 23 May 2025, he scored Napoli's second goal against Cagliari as they won 2–0 to secure the club's fourth Serie A title. During the 2025–26 pre-season, Lukaku sustained a left thigh injury which would sideline him for several months.

=== Fenerbahçe ===
On 12 August 2026, Lukaku joined Süper Lig side Fenerbahçe on a one-year deal. On 18 August, he made his debut with the team in a 2026–27 UEFA Champions League play-off round match, 1–1 first leg draw against Lyon.

== International career ==
=== 2008–2017: Youth level and early international career ===
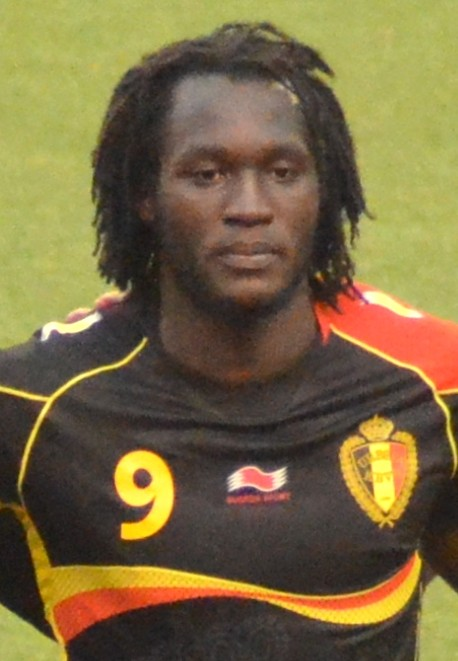
Lukaku with Belgium in 2013

Lukaku was a member of the Belgium under-21 team and scored a goal on his debut against Slovenia. On 24 February 2010, Lukaku was named for the first time in the Belgium senior squad for a friendly against Croatia. On 17 November 2010, he scored his first two international goals in a friendly against Russia. Lukaku scored his first goal in almost two years for the national team, netting the winner in a 4–2 friendly victory over rivals the Netherlands on 15 August 2012.

On 11 October 2013, Lukaku scored two goals as Belgium defeated Croatia 2–1 to secure a place in the World Cup finals. In May 2014, Lukaku was named in Belgium's squad for the 2014 World Cup. On 26 May, he scored his first international hat-trick in a pre-tournament friendly against neighbouring Luxembourg. However, as Belgium made seven substitutions during this match instead of the permitted six, it was not initially recognised as an official match by FIFA. On 1 June, he scored first of Belgium's two goals in the 2–0 victory in a friendly against Sweden. In Belgium's first match of the tournament, a 2–1 win against Algeria in Belo Horizonte, Lukaku started and played 58 minutes, before being replaced by Divock Origi. In the round of 16, Lukaku came on as a substitute prior to extra time, and assisted Kevin De Bruyne's opening goal three minutes later. In the 105th minute, he scored his first goal of the tournament, as Belgium defeated the United States 2–1.

On 29 March 2016, Lukaku headed a consolation in a 2–1 loss away to Portugal, assisted by his brother, Jordan Lukaku. At UEFA Euro 2016, Lukaku scored twice in Belgium's 3–0 second group stage match win on 18 June 2016 over the Republic of Ireland.

=== 2017–2018: All-time Belgium top scorer ===
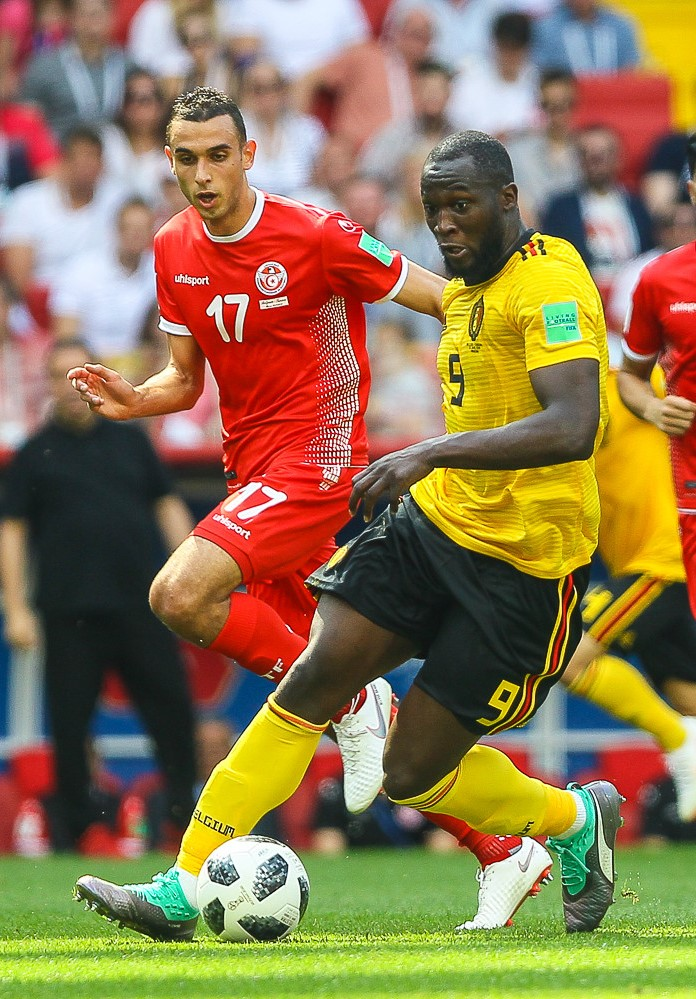
Lukaku (right) playing for Belgium at the 2018 FIFA World Cup

On 10 November 2017, Lukaku equalled the all-time Belgium goalscoring record set by Bernard Voorhoof and Paul Van Himst, after scoring twice against Mexico in a 3–3 draw. Four days after he equalled the record, Lukaku became Belgium's all-time record goalscorer with 31 international goals at the age of 24, after he scored the only goal in a 1–0 win over Japan. Although this record was counted by the Royal Belgian Football Association, FIFA initially only officially recognised 28 goals, after a nullified international friendly against Luxembourg on 26 May 2014, where he netted a hat trick in a 5–1 win, because the former Belgium coach, Marc Wilmots made seven substitutions during the match instead of the permitted six, which are not in accordance to the laws of the game. In 2023, FIFA recognizes the three matches from 2012, 2014 and 2017 in their FIFA Century Club.

On 6 June 2018, Lukaku officially became Belgium's all-time leading scorer with 31 goals, after scoring a goal in a 3–0 win over Egypt. He also broke a three-way tie with the previous record goalscorers, Bernard Voorhoof and Paul Van Himst.

=== 2018–2022: Belgium's Golden Generation ===
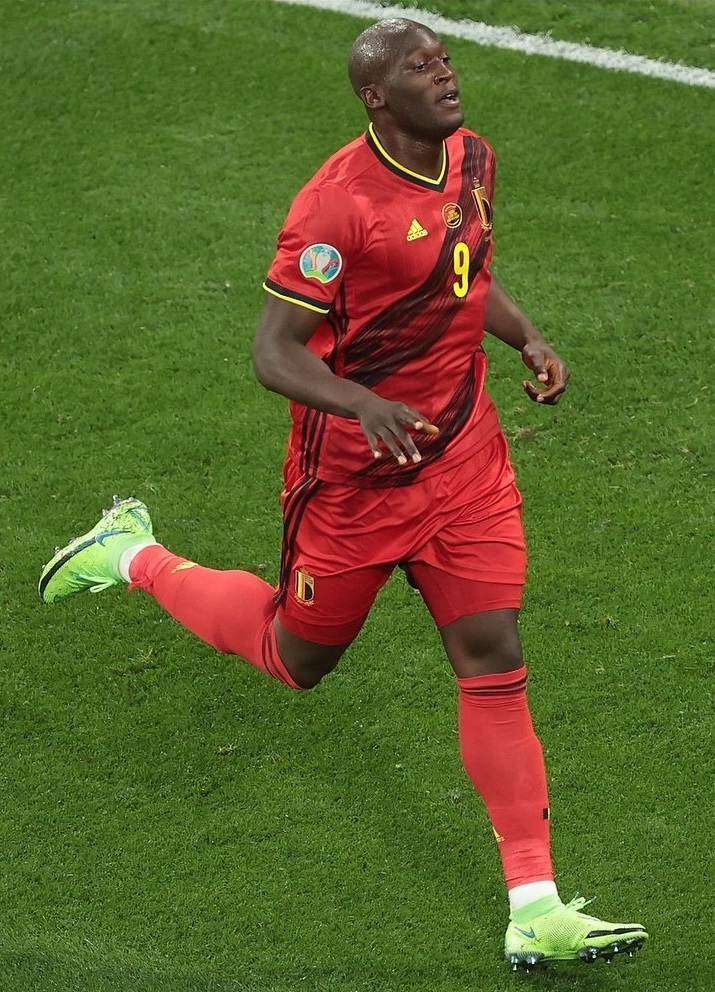
Lukaku playing for Belgium in 2021

On 18 June, Lukaku scored twice in a 3–0 win over Panama in their opening group game at the 2018 FIFA World Cup. In the next group game on 23 June 2018, he scored twice again in a 5–2 win over Tunisia. In doing so, Lukaku became the first player since Diego Maradona in 1986 to score two goals or more in consecutive World Cup matches. He eventually ended the tournament with four goals and one assist, which earned him the Bronze Boot award, as Belgium finished the tournament in third place.

Lukaku scored his 50th and 51st international goals in a 9–0 home win over San Marino on 10 October 2019, a Euro 2020 qualifier. On 12 June 2021, he scored twice in Belgium's opening group match of the postponed Euro 2020, a 3–0 defeat of Russia. He then scored the latter goal in a 2–0 victory against Finland on 21 June, ensuring his team finished the group stage with maximum points. On 2 July, he scored a late first-half penalty in Belgium's 2–1 quarter-final defeat to eventual tournament winners Italy. With four goals across the competition, Lukaku would go on to be named to the official Euro 2020 Team of the Tournament as its striker on 13 July, the only Belgian player to be included.

Lukaku made his 100th Belgium appearance on 5 September 2021 against the Czech Republic, scoring his 67th goal during the match.

In November 2022, Lukaku was named in the 26-man squad for the 2022 World Cup in Qatar, but hardly featured in Belgium's first two games due to a recovering hamstring and thigh injury, missing the former entirely and only playing the final ten minutes of their latter defeat to Morocco. He was brought on at half-time in Belgium's final group match against Croatia, with his side needing a win in order to progress to the knockout stage. Lukaku would notably miss four clear chances in front of goal during the second half as the match ended goalless, eliminating Belgium from the tournament in the group stage. A visibly distraught Lukaku could be seen crying into the arms of assistant coach Thierry Henry following the final whistle, before punching in the plexiglass on the side of the dugout as he left the pitch.

=== 2023–2026 ===
Lukaku (right) playing for Belgium at the 2026 FIFA World Cup

During qualifying for UEFA Euro 2024, Lukaku scored 14 goals in eight appearances, breaking the record for goals scored by a player in a European Championship qualifying campaign. On 28 May 2024, he was selected in the 25-man squad for the Euro 2024. On 17 June, he was denied two goals by VAR in the opening match against Slovakia, which ended in a 1–0 defeat.

On 15 May 2026, Lukaku was selected in the 26-man squad for the 2026 FIFA World Cup. A month later, on 26 June, he found the net in a 5–1 group stage victory over New Zealand, becoming Belgium's outright top scorer at the World Cup with six goals and breaking the tie with Marc Wilmots; he then set up Alexis Saelemaekers's goal later in the match. Brought on for the second half in the round of 32 against Senegal on 1 July, Lukaku scored Belgium's first goal in the 86th minute as they came from behind to draw 2–2 in regulation. He then allowed Youri Tielemans to take the penalty awarded at the very end of extra time which secured his team's victory, later explaining that he was not mentally prepared to take it himself. Five days later, he again came on as a substitute and scored his side's final goal during stoppage time of their 4–1 win over hosts the United States in the round of 16, sending Belgium into the quarter-finals.

Later in 2026, Lukaku was selected in the squad for the 2026–27 UEFA Nations League A, both for the September-October window as well as the November window, but in the six matches total he only started once and was subbed on lated twice, scoring one goal in the process. After conclusion of the group stage, on 16 November 2026, he suddenly announced his retirement from international football.

== Player profile ==
=== Style of play ===
Lukaku is a left-footed player, who in 2014 was named by The Guardian as one of the ten most promising young players in Europe. A large and physically powerful striker from an early age, Lukaku has been known to use his physicality to get around defenders. Despite his size, strength and ability to hold up play with his back to goal, his favoured role is not as a target-man, but as an out-and-out striker or poacher. He has also sometimes played as a winger. A well-rounded forward, who is also strong in the air, he possesses pace, athleticism, awareness, good link-up play, technical attributes and vision, as well as an ability to get into good attacking positions or create space for teammates with his intelligent runs off the ball. Although he was once criticised by pundits for his limited defensive contribution, he has since been praised by his managers for his work-rate off the ball. He has also come into criticism in the media at times over his movement and first touch.

=== Influences ===
In a 2016, Lukaku named Didier Drogba and Nicolas Anelka as the two strikers who made him want to play for Chelsea, but said that Ronaldo was his idol, and the major influence on him as a child.

== Personal life ==
Lukaku was born in Antwerp, Belgium to Congolese parents. His father, Roger Lukaku, played professional football and was capped at international level by Zaire. He has a younger brother named Jordan, who has progressed through the youth academy at Anderlecht. His cousin Boli Bolingoli-Mbombo plays as a left-sided winger or defender for Standard Liège.

Lukaku was the subject of a television documentary series called De School Van Lukaku (lit. 'The School of Lukaku') shown on the Dutch-language Eén network. The reality show followed the teenage Lukaku and his classmates during the course of a year at the Saint-Guidon Institute, a school in Brussels, where the footballer was based while with the Anderlecht youth team. In 2009, the series followed the school as it made a field trip to London, visiting Stamford Bridge. Lukaku said at the time: "What a stadium. If one day in my life I will cry, it will be the day I play here. I love Chelsea." Lukaku has stated his biggest idol was Didier Drogba.

Lukaku is a practising Catholic, praying frequently before and after matches. He made the pilgrimage to Lourdes in 2014. He is a teetotaller.

Lukaku is a polyglot and is able to speak eight languages: Dutch, English, German, French, Spanish, Portuguese, Italian and Lingala.

=== Media and endorsements ===
Lukaku was the first Premier League player to join Jay-Z's management agency Roc Nation Sports. In June 2018, he signed a record sponsorship deal with German sportswear company Puma, the company's largest endorsement deal ever.

=== Activism ===
Lukaku has spoken out against racism he suffered while playing football, particularly the 2019–20 Serie A season, his first year playing in Italy.

In 2020, Lukaku supported Black Lives Matter by kneeling and raising one fist, when he scored in a game with Inter against Sampdoria.

== Career statistics ==
=== Club ===
As of match played 21 November 2026

Appearances and goals by club, season and competition
Club	Season	League			National cup (Note: Includes Belgian Cup, FA Cup, Coppa Italia)		League cup (Note: Includes Football League/EFL Cup)		Europe		Other		Total	
Club	Season	Division	Apps	Goals	Apps	Goals	Apps	Goals	Apps	Goals	Apps	Goals	Apps	Goals
Anderlecht	2008–09	Belgian First Division	1	0	0	0	—		0	0	—		1	0
Anderlecht	2009–10	Belgian Pro League	33	15	1	0	—		11 (Note: One appearance in UEFA Champions League, ten appearances and four goals in UEFA Europa League)	4	—		45	19
Anderlecht	2010–11	Belgian Pro League	37	16	2	0	—		11 (Note: Three appearances and three goals in UEFA Champions League, eight appearances and one goal in UEFA Europa League)	4	—		50	20
Anderlecht	2011–12	Belgian Pro League	2	2	—		—		—		—		2	2
Anderlecht	Total		73	33	3	0	—		22	8	—		98	41
Chelsea	2011–12	Premier League	8	0	1	0	3	0	0	0	—		12	0
Chelsea	2013–14	Premier League	2	0	—		—		—		1 (Note: Appearance in UEFA Super Cup)	0	3	0
Chelsea	Total		10	0	1	0	3	0	0	0	1	0	15	0
West Bromwich Albion (loan)	2012–13	Premier League	35	17	2	0	1	0	—		—		38	17
Everton (loan)	2013–14	Premier League	31	15	1	1	1	0	—		—		33	16
Everton	2014–15	Premier League	36	10	2	2	1	0	9 (Note: Appearances in UEFA Europa League)	8	—		48	20
Everton	2015–16	Premier League	37	18	3	3	6	4	—		—		46	25
Everton	2016–17	Premier League	37	25	1	1	1	0	—		—		39	26
Everton	Total		141	68	7	7	9	4	9	8	—		166	87
Manchester United	2017–18	Premier League	34	16	6	5	2	0	8 (Note: Appearance(s) in UEFA Champions League)	5	1	1	51	27
Manchester United	2018–19	Premier League	32	12	3	1	1	0	9	2	—		45	15
Manchester United	Total		66	28	9	6	3	0	17	7	1	1	96	42
Inter Milan	2019–20	Serie A	36	23	4	2	—		11 (Note: Five appearances and two goals in UEFA Champions League, six appearances and seven goals in UEFA Europa League)	9	—		51	34
Inter Milan	2020–21	Serie A	36	24	3	2	—		5	4	—		44	30
Inter Milan	Total		72	47	7	4	—		16	13	—		95	64
Chelsea	2021–22	Premier League	26	8	6	3	4	0	6	2	2 (Note: Appearances in FIFA Club World Cup)	2	44	15
Inter Milan (loan)	2022–23	Serie A	25	10	4	1	—		8	3	0	0	37	14
Roma (loan)	2023–24	Serie A	32	13	2	1	—		13	7	—		47	21
Napoli	2024–25	Serie A	36	14	2	0	—		—		—		38	14
Napoli	2025–26	Serie A	5	1	1	0	—		1	0	0	0	7	1
Napoli	Total		41	15	3	0	—		1	0	0	0	45	15
Fenerbahçe	2026–27	Süper Lig	11	1	0	0	—		6	0	0	0	17	1
Career total			533	240	43	21	20	4	98	48	4	3	698	316

=== International ===
Appearances and goals by national team and year
National team	Year	Apps	Goals
Belgium	2010	8	2
Belgium	2011	5	0
Belgium	2012	5	1
Belgium	2013	8	2
Belgium	2014	11	6
Belgium	2015	5	0
Belgium	2016	14	11
Belgium	2017	9	9
Belgium	2018	14	14
Belgium	2019	5	7
Belgium	2020	5	5
Belgium	2021	12	11
Belgium	2022	3	0
Belgium	2023	9	15
Belgium	2024	7	2
Belgium	2025	4	4
Belgium	2026	11	5
Total		135	94

== Honours ==
Anderlecht

- Belgian Pro League: 2009–10

Manchester United

- FA Cup runner-up: 2017–18

Inter Milan

- Serie A: 2020–21
- Coppa Italia: 2022–23
- Supercoppa Italiana: 2022
- UEFA Champions League runner-up: 2022–23
- UEFA Europa League runner-up: 2019–20

Chelsea

- FIFA Club World Cup: 2021
- FA Cup runner-up: 2021–22
- EFL Cup runner-up: 2021–22

Napoli

- Serie A: 2024–25
- Supercoppa Italiana: 2025–26

Belgium

- FIFA World Cup third place: 2018

Individual

- Belgian Sportsman Promising Talent of the Year: 2009
- Belgian First Division top scorer: 2009–10 (15 goals)
- Belgian Bronze Shoe: 2009
- Belgian Silver Shoe: 2010
- Ebony Shoe: 2011
- Everton Young Player of the Season: 2015–16
- Everton Goal of the Season: 2015–16
- Everton Player of the Season: 2016–17
- Everton Players' Player of the Season: 2016–17
- Premier League Player of the Month: March 2017
- PFA Team of the Year: 2016–17 Premier League
- PFA Fans' Player of the Month: August/September 2017
- FIFA World Cup Bronze Boot: 2018
- Italian Football Hall of Fame (Davide Astori Fair Play Award): 2019
- UEFA Europa League Squad of the Season: 2019–20
- UEFA Europa League Player of the Season: 2019–20
- IFFHS World's Best International Goal Scorer: 2020, 2023
- Premio internazionale Giacinto Facchetti: 2020
- UEFA European Championship Team of the Tournament: 2020
- UEFA Nations League top scorer: 2020–21
- Serie A Player of the Month: February 2021
- Serie A Most Valuable Player: 2020–21
- Serie A Team of the Year: 2020–21
- Serie A Footballer of the Year: 2021
- Best Belgian Abroad: 2020, 2021, 2025
- Serie A Team of the Season: 2024–25
- The Athletic Serie A Team of the Season: 2024–25

== Notes ==
1. Lukaku's caps against Romania on 14 November 2012, against Luxembourg (including his hat-trick goals) on 26 May 2014, and against the Czech Republic on 5 June 2017 were counted by the RBFA, but not initially officially recognised by FIFA due to an excessive number of substitutions that violated the Laws of the Game.

== See also ==
- List of men's footballers with 50 or more international goals
- List of men's footballers with 100 or more international caps
- List of FIFA World Cup top goalscorers
