= Thomas Chatelle =

Belgian footballer

Personal information
- Full name: Thomas Chatelle
- Date of birth: 31 March 1981 (age 45)
- Place of birth: Jette, Belgium
- Height: 1.75 m (5 ft 9 in)
- Position: Winger

Youth career
- 1987–1993: Saint-Michel
- 1993–1994: Wavre
- 1994–1998: Mechelen

Senior career*
Years	Team	Apps	(Gls)
1998–2000	Gent	29	(1)
1999–2000	→ Mechelen (loan)	10	(2)
2000–2007	Genk	146	(13)
2008–2012	Anderlecht	58	(5)
2010–2011	→ N.E.C. (loan)	27	(0)
2012	→ Sint-Truiden (loan)	9	(0)
2012–2014	Mons	40	(2)
Total		319	(23)

International career
1995	Belgium U15	1	(0)
1995–1998	Belgium U16	11	(3)
1995–1998	Belgium U17	16	(3)
1998–1999	Belgium U18	6	(4)
1999–2003	Belgium U21	28	(4)
2004–2007	Belgium	3	(0)
- * Club domestic league appearances and goals

Thomas Chatelle (born 31 March 1981 in Jette, Brussels) is a retired Belgian footballer, who last played for Mons. He normally played as a winger and has gained 3 caps for the Belgium national team.

His former clubs include Racing Genk, AA Gent, K.V. Mechelen, Anderlecht, Sint-Truiden and the Dutch club N.E.C. Thomas has two daughters.

== Club career ==
=== Anderlecht ===
In January 2008, the former Racing Genk captain was sold to Anderlecht. At the start of the 2009–10 season, he scored a goal in the Champions League third round qualifying against Turkish side Sivasspor.

On 29 January 2012, Chatelle left Anderlecht join to Sint-Truiden on loan. After the loan spell ended, he was released by Anderlecht when his contract ended and stayed without a club from the end of the 2011–12 season until November 2012, when Mons signed him as a free player to replace the injured Tim Matthys.
