= Gil Servaes =

Belgian footballer

Personal information
- Date of birth: 11 April 1988 (age 38)
- Place of birth: Berchem-Sainte-Agathe, Belgium
- Height: 1.91 m (6 ft 3 in)
- Position: Centre back

Youth career
- 1999–2002: RFC Evere
- 2002–2004: Diegem Sport
- 2004–2006: KFC Strombeek
- 2006–2007: FC Brussels

Senior career*
Years	Team	Apps	(Gls)
2007–2008	Dender EH	10	(0)
2008–2009	Anderlecht	0	(0)
2009	OH Leuven	5	(0)
2009–2011	St. Wetteren	47	(4)
2011–2012	WS Woluwe	14	(0)
2012–2013	Racing Mechelen		
- * Club domestic league appearances and goals as of 19 June 2012

Gil Servaes (born 11 April 1988, in Berchem-Sainte-Agathe) is a retired Belgian association football player who last played for Racing Mechelen.

== Career ==
He has played for Anderlecht. Formerly played on youth side for RFC Evere, Diegem Sport, KFC Strombeek, FC Brussels and Dender EH.
