= Davy Schollen =

Belgian footballer

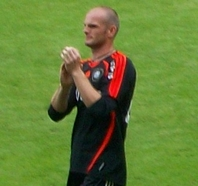

Personal information
- Full name: Davy Schollen
- Date of birth: 28 February 1978 (age 48)
- Place of birth: Sint-Truiden, Belgium
- Height: 1.90 m (6 ft 3 in)
- Position: Goalkeeper

Team information
- Current team: Sint-Truiden (U13-U19 goalkeeper coach)

Youth career
- Rummen

Senior career*
Years	Team	Apps	(Gls)
1996–1999	SC Hoegaarden	?	(?)
1999–2002	Sint-Truiden	23	(0)
2002–2004	Racing Genk	7	(0)
2004–2006	NAC Breda	49	(0)
2006–2012	Anderlecht	33	(0)
2012–2015	Sint-Truiden	28	(0)
Total		140	(0)

International career
2006	Belgium	1	(0)
- * Club domestic league appearances and goals

Davy Schollen (Dutch pronunciation: [ˈdeːvi ˈsxɔlə(n)]; born 28 February 1978) is a Belgian retired goalkeeper who last played for Sint-Truiden. He has been capped once for the national team, in 2006 against Turkey.

== Titles and Successes ==
- Belgian Champion: 2007, 2010, 2012
- Belgian Cup Winner: 2008
- Belgian Super Cup Winner: 2006, 2007, 2010
