= List of Belgian football transfers summer 2011 =

This is a list of Belgian football transfers for the 2011 summer transfer window. Only transfers involving a team from the Jupiler League are listed.

The summer transfer window will open on 1 July 2011, although some transfers took place prior to that date. Players without a club may join one at any time, either during or in between transfer windows. The transfer window ends on 31 August 2011, although a few completed transfers could still only be announced a few days later.

== Sorted by date ==
=== September 2010 ===
Date	Name	Moving from	Moving to	Fee	Note
September 6, 2010	(Denmark) Brian Hamalainen	(Denmark) Lyngby	(Belgium) Zulte Waregem	Undisclosed	

=== January 2011 ===
Date	Name	Moving from	Moving to	Fee	Note
January 17, 2011	(Belgium) Kevin Janssens	(Belgium) Lierse	(Belgium) Cercle Brugge	Undisclosed	(Note: Janssens was on loan until the end of the 2010–11 season from Lierse to second division team Turnhout. After the season, he transferred to Cercle Brugge.)
January 18, 2011	(Belgium) Thomas Meunier	(Belgium) Virton	(Belgium) Club Brugge	€100 000	
January 21, 2011	(Belgium) Kevin Taelemans	(Belgium) Overijse	(Belgium) Sint-Truiden	Undisclosed	

=== February 2011 ===
Date	Name	Moving from	Moving to	Fee	Note
February 15, 2011	(Belgium) Geert De Vlieger	(Belgium) Club Brugge	Free agent	Retired	
February 23, 2011	(Belgium) Martijn Monteyne	(Belgium) Germinal Beerschot	(Netherlands) Roda JC	Free	
February 27, 2011	(Belgium) David Wijns	(Belgium) Heist	(Belgium) Kortrijk	Undisclosed	

=== March 2011 ===
Date	Name	Moving from	Moving to	Fee	Note
March 1, 2011	(Belgium) Philippe Clement	(Belgium) Germinal Beerschot	Free agent	Retired	
March 1, 2011	(Belgium) Davy De Beule	(Belgium) Kortrijk	(Netherlands) Roda JC	Free	
March 1, 2011	(England) Paul Taylor	(Belgium) Anderlecht	(England) Peterborough United	Undisclosed	
March 14, 2011	(Belgium) Gertjan De Mets	(Belgium) Club Brugge	(Belgium) Kortrijk	Undisclosed	(Note: De Mets was already on loan from Club Brugge to Kortrijk. The loan will end at the end of the 2010–11 season, but Kortrijk has used their option to sign De Mets on a full contract.)
March 17, 2011	(Czech Republic) Ondřej Smetana	(Slovakia) Senica	(Belgium) Sint-Truiden	Undisclosed	
March 21, 2011	(Belgium) Ludwin Van Nieuwenhuyze	(Belgium) Zulte Waregem	(Belgium) Oudenaarde	Undisclosed	
March 23, 2011	(Sweden) Fredrik Stenman	(Netherlands) Groningen	(Belgium) Club Brugge	Free	
March 25, 2011	(Czech Republic) Jan Lecjaks	(Belgium) Anderlecht	(Czech Republic) Viktoria Plzeň	Loan return	
March 25, 2011	(Belgium) Björn Vleminckx	(Netherlands) NEC Nijmegen	(Belgium) Club Brugge	€3 300 000	
March 29, 2011	(Belgium) Sven Kums	(Belgium) Kortrijk	(Netherlands) Heerenveen	€500 000	
March 31, 2011	(Belgium) Kyliaan Butsraen	(Belgium) Oostende	(Belgium) AA Gent	Undisclosed	

=== April 2011 ===
Date	Name	Moving from	Moving to	Fee	Note
April 1, 2011	(Belgium) Jeffrey Christiaens	(Belgium) Club Brugge	(Belgium) Torhout	Undisclosed	
April 1, 2011	(Belgium) Robin Henkens	(Belgium) Lommel United	(Belgium) KV Mechelen	Free	
April 6, 2011	(Belgium) Dimitri Daeseleire	(Belgium) Racing Genk	(Belgium) Sint-Truiden	Undisclosed	
April 13, 2011	(Belgium) Joren Dom	(Belgium) KV Mechelen	(Belgium) Dender	Undisclosed	(Note: Dom was on loan until the end of the 2010–11 season from KV Mechelen to Rupel Boom. After the season, he transferred to Dender.)
April 13, 2011	(Belgium) Jef Vogels	(Belgium) Antwerp	(Belgium) AA Gent	Undisclosed	
April 20, 2011	(Serbia) Vladan Kujović	(Netherlands) Willem II	(Belgium) Club Brugge	Free	
April 21, 2011	(Democratic Republic of the Congo) Trésor Diowo	(Belgium) Tubize	(Belgium) Germinal Beerschot	Undisclosed	
April 23, 2011	(France) Medhi Terki	(Belgium) Mons	(Belgium) AA Gent	Free	
April 24, 2011	(Italy) Alessandro Iandoli	(Belgium) Eupen	(Belgium) Sint-Truiden	Free	
April 26, 2011	(Belgium) Guy Dufour	(Belgium) Lommel United	(Belgium) Standard Liège	Free	
April 26, 2011	(Belgium) Cédric Vanhee	(Belgium) Cercle Brugge	(Belgium) Torhout	Undisclosed	
April 27, 2011	(Morocco) Soufiane Bidaoui	(Belgium) Westerlo	(Belgium) Lierse	Free	(Note: Bidaoui was on loan until the end of the 2010–11 season from Westerlo to second division team Roeselare. After the season, he transferred to Lierse.)
April 28, 2011	(Belgium) Geoffrey Mujangi Bia	(England) Wolverhampton	(Belgium) Standard Liège	Undisclosed	
April 29, 2011	(Belgium) Denis Odoi	(Belgium) Sint-Truiden	(Belgium) Anderlecht	€1 500 000	

=== May 2011 ===
Date	Name	Moving from	Moving to	Fee	Note
May 2, 2011	(Brazil) Marcao	(Brazil) Ferroviária	(Belgium) Westerlo	Undisclosed	
May 5, 2011	(Belgium) Arnaud De Greef	(Belgium) Anderlecht	(Belgium) Westerlo	Free	
May 6, 2011	(Uruguay) Gary Kagelmacher	(Spain) Real Madrid Castilla	(Belgium) Germinal Beerschot	Undisclosed	(Note: Kagelmacher was already on loan from Real Madrid. The loan ended, but Kagelmacher was now signed on a full contract.)
May 6, 2011	(Nigeria) Sani Kaita	(France) AS Monaco	(Belgium) Germinal Beerschot	Undisclosed	(Note: Kaita was on loan from AS Monaco to Iraklis. The loan ended and he was immediately sold to Beerschot AC.)
May 6, 2011	(Colombia) Jaime Ruiz	(Belgium) Westerlo	(Belgium) KV Mechelen	Undisclosed	
May 6, 2011	(Senegal) Ibrahima Sidibe	(Belgium) Sint-Truiden	(Belgium) Germinal Beerschot	Undisclosed	
May 6, 2011	(Belgium) Kevin Vandenbergh	(Belgium) Eupen	(Belgium) KV Mechelen	Undisclosed	
May 6, 2011	(Belgium) Tom Vandenbossche	(Belgium) Kortrijk	(Belgium) Dender	Undisclosed	
May 7, 2011	(Belgium) Laurens Vandenheede	(Belgium) Club Brugge	(Belgium) Dender	Undisclosed	
May 7, 2011	(Belgium) Kurt Weuts	(Belgium) Sint-Truiden	(Belgium) Heist	Undisclosed	
May 10, 2011	(Spain) Víctor Vázquez	(Spain) Barcelona B	(Belgium) Club Brugge	Free	
May 16, 2011	(Belgium) Alessandro Cordaro	(Belgium) Charleroi	(Belgium) KV Mechelen	Undisclosed	
May 17, 2011	(Brazil) Diogo	(Brazil) São Paulo	(Belgium) Anderlecht	Loan	
May 18, 2011	(Belgium) Mats Rits	(Belgium) Germinal Beerschot	(Netherlands) Ajax	Undisclosed	
May 19, 2011	(Cameroon) Ernest Nfor	(Belgium) Zulte Waregem	(Belgium) Kortrijk	Undisclosed	
May 19, 2011	(Belgium) Bigen Yala Lusala	(Belgium) Anderlecht	(Belgium) Lokeren	Loan	
May 20, 2011	(Argentina) Hernán Losada	(Belgium) Anderlecht	(Belgium) Beerschot	Undisclosed	
May 20, 2011	(Senegal) Abdoulaye Seck	(Senegal) Niarry-Tally	(Belgium) Anderlecht	Undisclosed	(Note: Seck was already on loan from ASC Niarry-Tally. The loan ended, but Seck was now signed on a full contract.)
May 23, 2011	(Belgium) Massimo Bruno	(Belgium) Charleroi	(Belgium) Anderlecht	Undisclosed	
May 23, 2011	(Hungary) Péter Czvitkovics	(Hungary) Debrecen	(Belgium) Kortrijk	Free	
May 23, 2011	(Belgium) Jordan Garcia Calvete	(Belgium) Anderlecht	(Belgium) Sint-Truiden	Loan	
May 23, 2011	(Belgium) David Vandenbroeck	(Belgium) Zulte Waregem	(Belgium) Kortrijk	Loan	
May 24, 2011	(Belgium) Franz Dieu	(Belgium) Mons	(Belgium) Boussu Dour	Undisclosed	
May 24, 2011	(Burundi) Valery Nahayo	(South Africa) Kaizer Chiefs	(Belgium) AA Gent	Undisclosed	
May 26, 2011	(Belgium) Monsef Znagui	(Belgium) Kortrijk	(Belgium) Racing Waregem	Undisclosed	
May 27, 2011	(Denmark) Niki Zimling	(Italy) Udinese	(Belgium) Club Brugge	€500 000	(Note: Zimling was on loan from Udinese to NEC Nijmegen. The loan ended and he was immediately sold to Club Brugge.)
May 29, 2011	(Belgium) Giuseppe Rossini	(Belgium) Kortrijk	(Belgium) Zulte Waregem	Undisclosed	
May 29, 2011	(Iceland) Ólafur Ingi Skúlason	(Denmark) SønderjyskE	(Belgium) Zulte Waregem	Undisclosed	
May 30, 2011	(Belgium) Pieter Beckers	(Belgium) OH Leuven	(Belgium) RC Mechelen	Undisclosed	
May 30, 2011	(Senegal) Ismaïla N'Diaye	(France) Caen	(Belgium) Kortrijk	Undisclosed	
May 30, 2011	(Croatia) Ivan Perišić	(Belgium) Club Brugge	(Germany) Borussia Dortmund	€5 500 000	
May 30, 2011	(Sweden) Behrang Safari	(Switzerland) Basel	(Belgium) Anderlecht	Undisclosed	
May 30, 2011	(Brazil) Bruno Andrade	(Netherlands) Helmond Sport	(Belgium) Sint-Truiden	Undisclosed	
May 31, 2011	(Belgium) Stefan Roef	(Belgium) Anderlecht	(Belgium) Westerlo	Undisclosed	

=== End of 2010–11 season ===
After the end of the 2010–11 season, several players will return from loan to another club or will not have their contracts extended. These will be listed here when the date is otherwise not specified.

Date	Name	Moving from	Moving to	Fee	Note
End of 2010–11 season	(Belgium) Jeroen Appeltans	(Belgium) Grimbergen	(Belgium) Sint-Truiden	Loan Return	
End of 2010–11 season	(Belgium) Raoul Avansey	(Belgium) Rupel Boom	(Belgium) KV Mechelen	Loan Return	
End of 2010–11 season	(Belgium) Christian Benteke	(Belgium) KV Mechelen	(Belgium) Standard Liège	Loan Return	
End of 2010–11 season	(Honduras) Víctor Bernárdez	(Belgium) Lierse	(Belgium) Anderlecht	Loan Return	
End of 2010–11 season	(France) Cédric Bétrémieux	(Belgium) Mouscron-Péruwelz	(Belgium) Kortrijk	Loan Return	(Note: Bétrémieux was on loan from Kortrijk to Mouscron-Péruwelz. The loan will end at the end of the 2010–11 season. He will join Fréjus after the loan.)
End of 2010–11 season	(Morocco) Soufiane Bidaoui	(Belgium) Roeselare	(Belgium) Westerlo	Loan Return	
End of 2010–11 season	(Russia) Dmitri Bulykin	(Netherlands) ADO Den Haag	(Belgium) Anderlecht	Loan Return	
End of 2010–11 season	(Belgium) Jonas Buyse	(Belgium) Roeselare	(Belgium) Cercle Brugge	Loan Return	
End of 2010–11 season	(Belgium) Thomas Chatelle	(Netherlands) NEC Nijmegen	(Belgium) Anderlecht	Loan Return	
End of 2010–11 season	(Argentina) Pablo Chavarría	(Belgium) Eupen	(Belgium) Anderlecht	Loan Return	(Note: Chavarría was on loan from Anderlecht to Eupen. The loan ended at the end of the 2010–11 season, after which he was loaned out to Kortrijk.)
End of 2010–11 season	(Belgium) Zinho Chergui	(Belgium) Roeselare	(Belgium) KV Mechelen	Loan Return	(Note: Chergui was on loan from Mechelen to Roeselare. The loan ended at the end of the 2010–11 season, but now he is loaned to Antwerp.)
End of 2010–11 season	(France) Gregory Christ	(Greece) Panthrakikos	(Belgium) Sint-Truiden	Loan Return	
End of 2010–11 season	(Colombia) Daniel Cruz	(Belgium) Beerschot	Free agent	End of Contract	(Note: Although it was announced earlier that Cruz would officially leave Beerschot at the end of the 2010–11 season, he stayed with team and only transferred on August 4th.)
End of 2010–11 season	(Belgium) Rubin Dantschotter	(Belgium) KV Oostende	(Belgium) Cercle Brugge	Loan Return	
End of 2010–11 season	(Belgium) Brecht Delbeke	(Netherlands) Hoek	(Belgium) Cercle Brugge	Loan Return	
End of 2010–11 season	(Belgium) Mark De Man	(Belgium) OH Leuven	(Belgium) Beerschot	Loan Return	
End of 2010–11 season	(Belgium) Gertjan De Mets	(Belgium) Kortrijk	(Belgium) Club Brugge	Loan Return	
End of 2010–11 season	(Belgium) Tom De Mul	(Belgium) Standard Liège	(Spain) Sevilla	Loan Return	
End of 2010–11 season	(Belgium) Joren Dom	(Belgium) Rupel Boom	(Belgium) KV Mechelen	Loan Return	
End of 2010–11 season	(Nigeria) Tosin Dosunmu	(Netherlands) MVV	(Belgium) Beerschot	Loan Return	(Note: Dosunmu was on loan from Beerschot to MVV during the 2010–11 season, after the loan he was released and subsequently signed by Antwerp.)
End of 2010–11 season	(Mali) Kassim Doumbia	(Belgium) Brussels	(Belgium) AA Gent	Loan Return	(Note: Doumbia was on loan from AA Gent to Brussels. The loan will end at the end of the 2010–11 season. He will join Waasland-Beveren on a 2-year contract.)
End of 2010–11 season	(Israel) Rami Gershon	(Belgium) Kortrijk	(Belgium) Standard Liège	Loan Return	(Note: Gershon was already on loan from Standard to Kortrijk. The loan ended at the end of the 2010–11 season, but was renewed in July.)
End of 2010–11 season	(Brazil) Paulo Henrique	(Belgium) Westerlo	(Brazil) Desportivo Brasil	Loan Return	
End of 2010–11 season	(Nigeria) Manasseh Ishiaku	(Belgium) Sint-Truiden	(Germany) 1. FC Köln	Loan Return	
End of 2010–11 season	(Belgium) Kevin Janssens	(Belgium) Turnhout	(Belgium) Lierse	Loan Return	
End of 2010–11 season	(Democratic Republic of the Congo) Junior Kabananga	(Belgium) Beerschot	(Belgium) Anderlecht	Loan Return	
End of 2010–11 season	(Belgium) Christian Kabasele	(Belgium) KV Mechelen	(Belgium) Eupen	Loan Return	
End of 2010–11 season	(Guinea) Tidiane Kourouma	(Belgium) Rupel Boom	(Belgium) KV Mechelen	Loan Return	
End of 2010–11 season	(Argentina) Hernán Losada	(Belgium) Charleroi	(Belgium) Anderlecht	Loan Return	
End of 2010–11 season	(Syria) Senharib Malki	(Greece) Panthrakikos	(Belgium) Lokeren	Loan Return	(Note: Malki was on loan from Lokeren to Panthrakikos. The loan ended at the end of the 2010–11 season, after which he was sold to Roda JC.)
End of 2010–11 season	(Belgium) Benoit Masset	(Belgium) Grimbergen	(Belgium) Sint-Truiden	Loan Return	
End of 2010–11 season	(Belgium) Roy Mauro	(Belgium) Turnhout	(Belgium) Beerschot	Loan Return	
End of 2010–11 season	(France) Chris Mavinga	(Belgium) Genk	(England) Liverpool	Loan Return	
End of 2010–11 season	(Belgium) Roy Meeus	(Belgium) Dender	(Belgium) Club Brugge	Loan Return	
End of 2010–11 season	(Belgium) Andrea Mutombo	(Belgium) Sint-Truiden	(Belgium) Standard Liège	Loan Return	
End of 2010–11 season	(Belgium) Olivier Mukendi	(Belgium) Union	(Belgium) Anderlecht	Loan Return	
End of 2010–11 season	(Mali) Mamoutou N'Diaye	(Belgium) Mons	(Belgium) AA Gent	Loan Return	
End of 2010–11 season	(Ghana) William Owusu	(Belgium) Cercle Brugge	(Portugal) Sporting	Loan Return	(Note: Owusu was on loan from Sporting to Cercle Brugge. The loan ended at the end of the 2010–11 season, but now he is loaned to Westerlo.)
End of 2010–11 season	(Belgium) Kevin Packet	(Belgium) Coxyde	(Belgium) Cercle Brugge	Loan Return	
End of 2010–11 season	(Belgium) Laurens Paulussen	(Belgium) Waasland-Beveren	(Belgium) KV Mechelen	Loan Return	
End of 2010–11 season	(France) Jérémy Perbet	(Belgium) Mons	(Belgium) Lokeren	Loan Return	(Note: Perbet was on loan from Lokeren to Mons during the second half of the 2010–11 season. At the end of the loan, Mons decided to buy Perbet, stating that based on an option in his loan contract they were allowed to do that for € 100 000. Lokeren refused, interpreting the contract differently and stating the transfer amount should be € 500 000. After a judge ruled in favor of Lokeren, Mons decided to buy Perbet on August 3rd and pay the requested amount.)
End of 2010–11 season	(Belgium) Sebastien Phiri	(Belgium) FC Brussels	(Belgium) AA Gent	Loan Return	
End of 2010–11 season	(Montenegro) Milan Purovic	(Belgium) Cercle Brugge	Sporting Portugal	Loan Return	
End of 2010–11 season	(Canada) Tomasz Radzinski	(Belgium) Lierse	Free agent	End of Contract	
End of 2010–11 season	(Brazil) Reynaldo	(Belgium) Cercle Brugge	(Belgium) Anderlecht	Loan Return	
End of 2010–11 season	(Serbia) Nemanja Rnić	(Belgium) Beerschot	(Belgium) Anderlecht	Loan Return	(Note: Rnić was on loan from Anderlecht to Beerschot AC. The loan ended at the end of the 2010–11 season, after which he was sold to Partizan Belgrade.)
End of 2010–11 season	(The Gambia) Ebrahim Savaneh	(Belgium) KV Mechelen	(Belgium) Kortrijk	Loan Return	
End of 2010–11 season	(Serbia) Stefan Scepovic	(Belgium) Kortrijk	(Belgium) Club Brugge	Loan Return	
End of 2010–11 season	(Belgium) Wouter Scheelen	(Belgium) OH Leuven	(Belgium) Westerlo	Loan Return	(Note: Scheelen was on loan from Westerlo to Oud-Heverlee Leuven. The loan ended at the end of the 2010–11 season, but now he is loaned to Fortuna Sittard.)
End of 2010–11 season	(Cameroon) Sébastien Siani	(Belgium) Brussels	(Belgium) Anderlecht	Loan Return	(Note: Siani was already on loan from Anderlecht to Brussels. The loan will end at the end of the 2010–11 season, but Brussels has used their option to sign Siani on a full contract.)
End of 2010–11 season	(Brazil) Cleber Sonda	(Belgium) Roeselare	(Belgium) Club Brugge	Loan Return	
End of 2010–11 season	(Bosnia and Herzegovina) Toni Sunjic	(Belgium) Kortrijk	(Bosnia and Herzegovina) Zrinjski Mostar	Loan Return	
End of 2010–11 season	(Hungary) Tibor Tisza	(Belgium) Sint-Truiden	(Hungary) Újpest	Loan Return	
End of 2010–11 season	(Ivory Coast) Moussa Traoré	(Belgium) Zulte Waregem	(Belgium) Standard Liège	Loan Return	
End of 2010–11 season	(Belgium) Sven Van Der Jeugt	(Belgium) Sint-Truiden	Free agent	End of Contract	
End of 2010–11 season	(South Africa) Elrio van Heerden	(Belgium) Westerlo	Free agent	Contract ended	
End of 2010–11 season	(Belgium) Matti Van Minnebruggen	(Belgium) Waasland-Beveren	(Belgium) Beerschot	Loan Return	(Note: Van Minnebruggen was already on loan from Beerschot to Waasland-Beveren. The loan will end at the end of the 2010–11 season, but Waasland-Beveren has used their option to sign Van Minnebruggen on a full contract.)
End of 2010–11 season	(Belgium) Glenn Verbauwhede	(Belgium) Kortrijk	(Belgium) Club Brugge	Loan Return	
End of 2010–11 season	(Cameroon) Justice Wamfor	(Belgium) Beerschot	Free agent	End of contract	
End of 2010–11 season	(Belgium) Kurt Weuts	(Belgium) OH Leuven	(Belgium) Sint-Truiden	Loan Return	
End of 2010–11 season	(Ukraine) Oleksandr Yakovenko	(Belgium) Westerlo	(Belgium) Anderlecht	Loan Return	

=== June 2011 ===
Date	Name	Moving from	Moving to	Fee	Note
June 6, 2011	(Morocco) Rachid Bourabia	(Belgium) Waasland-Beveren	(Belgium) Mons	Undisclosed	
June 6, 2011	(Iceland) Jón Guðni Fjóluson	(Iceland) Fram	(Belgium) Beerschot	Undisclosed	
June 8, 2011	(Sweden) Michael Almebäck	(Sweden) Örebro	(Belgium) Club Brugge	€550 000	
June 8, 2011	(Brazil) Edenilson Bergonsi	(Belgium) Brussels	(Belgium) Standard Liège	Undisclosed	
June 9, 2011	(Belgium) Pieterjan Monteyne	(Belgium) Beerschot	(Belgium) Mons	Undisclosed	
June 9, 2011	(Belgium) Quentin Pottiez	(France) Lens	(Belgium) Mons	Undisclosed	
June 10, 2011	(Democratic Republic of the Congo) Chancel Mbemba Mangulu	(Democratic Republic of the Congo) FC MK	(Belgium) Anderlecht	Loan	
June 10, 2011	(Belgium) Kristof Van Hout	(Belgium) Standard Liège	(Belgium) Kortrijk	Undisclosed	
June 11, 2011	(Cameroon) Sébastien Siani	(Belgium) Anderlecht	(Belgium) Brussels	Undisclosed	
June 14, 2011	(France) Cédric Bétrémieux	(Belgium) Kortrijk	(France) Fréjus-Saint-Raphaël	Undisclosed	
June 14, 2011	(South Africa) Darren Keet	(South Africa) Bidvest Wits	(Belgium) Kortrijk	Undisclosed	
June 15, 2011	(Portugal) Amido Baldé	(Portugal) Sporting	(Belgium) Cercle Brugge	Loan	
June 15, 2011	(France) Steeven Joseph-Monrose	(France) Lens	(Belgium) Kortrijk	Undisclosed	
June 15, 2011	(Brazil) Renato Neto	(Portugal) Sporting	(Belgium) Cercle Brugge	Loan	(Note: Both Neto and Reis were already on loan from Sporting. The loan ended but was renewed for another season.)
June 15, 2011	(Portugal) Nuno Reis	(Portugal) Sporting	(Belgium) Cercle Brugge	Loan	
June 15, 2011	(Belgium) Kevin Roelandts	(Belgium) Zulte Waregem	(Belgium) OH Leuven	Undisclosed	
June 15, 2011	(Israel) Liroy Zhairi	(Israel) Bnei Yehuda	(Belgium) KV Mechelen	Undisclosed	
June 16, 2011	(Belgium) Matti Van Minnebruggen	(Belgium) Beerschot	(Belgium) Waasland-Beveren	Undisclosed	
June 17, 2011	(Belgium) Davy De Fauw	(Netherlands) Roda	(Belgium) Zulte Waregem	Undisclosed	
June 17, 2011	(Iran) Reza Ghoochannejhad	(Netherlands) Cambuur	(Belgium) Sint-Truiden	Undisclosed	
June 17, 2011	(Sweden) Guillermo Molins	(Sweden) Malmö	(Belgium) Anderlecht	Undisclosed	
June 17, 2011	(South Africa) Lindani Ntamo	(South Africa) ASD Cape Town	(Belgium) Beerschot	Undisclosed	
June 17, 2011	(South Africa) Sive Phekezela	(South Africa) ASD Cape Town	(Belgium) Beerschot	Undisclosed	
June 17, 2011	(Brazil) Samuel	(Germany) Werder Bremen	(Belgium) Anderlecht	Undisclosed	
June 17, 2011	(Belgium) Marc Wagemakers	(Belgium) Sint-Truiden	(Netherlands) Fortuna Sittard	Undisclosed	
June 17, 2011	(Belgium) Dries Wuytens	(Netherlands) PSV	(Belgium) Beerschot	Undisclosed	
June 18, 2011	(Norway) Tom Høgli	(Norway) Tromsø	(Belgium) Club Brugge	€1 000 000	
June 20, 2011	(Belgium) Dino Arslanagic	(France) Lille	(Belgium) Standard Liège	Undisclosed	
June 20, 2011	(Belgium) Thomas Azevedo	(Belgium) Lommel United	(Belgium) OH Leuven	Undisclosed	
June 20, 2011	(Belgium) Emmerik De Vriese	(Belgium) Antwerp	(Belgium) OH Leuven	Undisclosed	
June 20, 2011	(France) Peter Franquart	(France) Lille	(Belgium) Mons	Undisclosed	
June 20, 2011	(Tunisia) Hamdi Harbaoui	(Belgium) OH Leuven	(Belgium) Lokeren	Undisclosed	
June 20, 2011	(Belgium) René Sterckx	(Belgium) Anderlecht	(Belgium) Zulte Waregem	Loan	(Note: Sterckx was already on loan from Anderlecht to Zulte Waregem. The loan ended but was renewed for another season.)
June 20, 2011	(Belgium) Jorn Vermeulen	(Belgium) Club Brugge	(Belgium) OH Leuven	Undisclosed	
June 21, 2011	(Israel) Lior Refaelov	(Israel) Maccabi Haifa	(Belgium) Club Brugge	€2 500 000	
June 22, 2011	(Serbia) Luka Milunović	(Serbia) OFK Beograd	(Belgium) Zulte Waregem	Undisclosed	
June 22, 2011	(Belgium) Pietro Perdichizzi	(Belgium) Charleroi	(Belgium) Club Brugge	Undisclosed	
June 22, 2011	(Belgium) Christopher Verbist	(Belgium) Standard Liège	(Belgium) Charleroi	Undisclosed	
June 23, 2011	(Belgium) Damien Lahaye	(Belgium) Kortrijk	(Belgium) Tubize	Undisclosed	
June 24, 2011	(Peru) Daniel Chávez	(Belgium) Westerlo	(Romania) Oţelul Galaţi	Undisclosed	
June 24, 2011	(Senegal) Christophe Diandy	(Belgium) Anderlecht	(Belgium) OH Leuven	Loan	
June 24, 2011	(Bosnia and Herzegovina) Adnan Mravac	(Belgium) Westerlo	(Austria) Mattersburg	Undisclosed	
June 25, 2011	(North Macedonia) Aleksandar Trajkovski	(Croatia) Inter Zaprešić	(Belgium) Zulte Waregem	€1 100 000	
June 25, 2011	(Belgium) Olivier Werner	(Belgium) Eupen	(Belgium) Mons	Undisclosed	
June 27, 2011	(Sweden) Patrick Amoah	(Belgium) WS Woluwe	(Belgium) OH Leuven	Undisclosed	
June 27, 2011	(Bosnia and Herzegovina) Ervin Zukanović	(Belgium) Eupen	(Belgium) Kortrijk	Undisclosed	
June 27, 2011	(Brazil) Rômulo	(Brazil) Brasiliense	(Belgium) Westerlo	Undisclosed	
June 29, 2011	(Israel) Roei Dayan	(Israel) Hapoel Acre	(Belgium) Beerschot	Undisclosed	
June 29, 2011	(Mali) Kassim Doumbia	(Belgium) AA Gent	(Belgium) Waasland-Beveren	Undisclosed	
June 29, 2011	(Cameroon) Dorge Kouemaha	(Belgium) Club Brugge	(Germany) 1. FC Kaiserslautern	Loan	
June 29, 2011	(Belgium) Birger Longueville	(Belgium) Anderlecht	(Belgium) Roeselare	Undisclosed	
June 29, 2011	(Venezuela) Ronald Vargas	(Belgium) Club Brugge	(Belgium) Anderlecht	€2 500 000	
June 29, 2011	(Belgium) Brecht Verbrugghe	(Belgium) Mons	(Belgium) Tournai	Undisclosed	
June 30, 2011	(Belgium) Frederik Boi	(Belgium) Cercle Brugge	(Belgium) OH Leuven	Undisclosed	
June 30, 2011	(Belgium) Rubin Dantschotter	(Belgium) Cercle Brugge	(Netherlands) Sparta	Loan	
June 30, 2011	(Belgium) Jérémy Huyghebaert	(Belgium) KV Mechelen	(Belgium) Roeselare	Loan	
June 30, 2011	(Belgium) Laurens Paulussen	(Belgium) KV Mechelen	(Belgium) Waasland-Beveren	Loan	
June 30, 2011	(Ukraine) Serhiy Serebrennikov	(Belgium) Cercle Brugge	(Belgium) Roeselare	Undisclosed	
June 30, 2011	(Belgium) Yannick Thoelen	(Belgium) KV Mechelen	(Belgium) Lommel United	Loan	
June 30, 2011	(Belgium) Peter Van Der Heyden	(Belgium) Club Brugge	(Belgium) Beerschot	Free	
June 30, 2011	(Belgium) Romeo Van Dessel	(Belgium) KV Mechelen	(Belgium) Antwerp	Loan	

=== July 2011 ===
Date	Name	Moving from	Moving to	Fee	Note
July 1, 2011	(Belgium) Mark De Man	(Belgium) Beerschot	Free agent	Free	
July 2, 2011	(Netherlands) Sergio Padt	(Netherlands) Ajax	(Belgium) Gent	Undisclosed	(Note: Padt was on loan from Ajax to Go Ahead Eagles. The loan ended at the end of the 2010–11 season and he was sold to Gent.)
July 4, 2011	(Belgium) Jonas Buyse	(Belgium) Cercle Brugge	(Belgium) Woluwe-Zaventem	Loan	
July 4, 2011	(Senegal) Papa Sene	(Belgium) Cercle Brugge	(Belgium) Roeselare	Loan	
July 5, 2011	(Israel) Rami Gershon	(Belgium) Standard Liège	(Belgium) Kortrijk	Loan	
July 5, 2011	(North Macedonia) Boban Grnčarov	(Cyprus) APOEL	(Belgium) Lierse	Free	
July 5, 2011	(Tunisia) Karim Saidi	(France) Tours	(Belgium) Lierse	Undisclosed	
July 7, 2011	(Honduras) Víctor Bernárdez	(Belgium) Anderlecht	(Mexico) Ciudad Juárez	Loan	
July 7, 2011	(Belgium) Timothy Dreesen	(Belgium) Lierse	(Netherlands) Fortuna Sittard	Undisclosed	
July 7, 2011	(Belgium) Roy Meeus	(Belgium) Club Brugge	(Belgium) Lommel United	Free	
July 7, 2011	(Portugal) Rudy	(Portugal) Atlético CP	(Belgium) Cercle Brugge	Undisclosed	
July 9, 2011	(The Gambia) Ibou Savaneh	(Belgium) Kortrijk	(Belgium) Mons	Loan	
July 10, 2011	(Costa Rica) Júnior Díaz	(Belgium) Club Brugge	(Poland) Wisła Kraków	Loan	
July 12, 2011	(The Gambia) Mustapha Jarju	(Belgium) Mons	(Canada) Vancouver Whitecaps	Free	
July 13, 2011	(Belgium) Axel Witsel	(Belgium) Standard Liège	(Portugal) Benfica	Undisclosed	
July 14, 2011	(Belgium) Wouter Scheelen	(Belgium) Westerlo	(Netherlands) Fortuna Sittard	Loan	
July 15, 2011	(Belgium) Koen Casteels	(Belgium) Genk	(Germany) TSG 1899 Hoffenheim	Undisclosed	
July 15, 2011	(Ghana) William Owusu	(Portugal) Sporting	(Belgium) Westerlo	Loan	
July 16, 2011	(Belgium) Zinho Chergui	(Belgium) KV Mechelen	(Belgium) Antwerp	Loan	
July 16, 2011	(Belgium) Thibaut Courtois	(Belgium) Genk	(England) Chelsea	€9 000 000	
July 17, 2011	(Cameroon) Eric Matoukou	(Belgium) Genk	(Ukraine) Dnipro Dnipropetrovsk	Undisclosed	
July 18, 2011	(Israel) Dor Malul	(Israel) Maccabi Tel Aviv	(Belgium) Beerschot	Loan	
July 18, 2011	(Belgium) Paul-Jose M'Poku	(England) Tottenham Hotspur	(Belgium) Standard Liège	Undisclosed	
July 18, 2011	(Belgium) Luigi Pieroni	(Belgium) Standard Liège	(France) Arles-Avignon	Undisclosed	
July 19, 2011	(France) Karim Belhocine	(Belgium) Kortrijk	(Belgium) Standard Liège	Undisclosed	
July 19, 2011	(Syria) Senharib Malki	(Belgium) Lokeren	(Netherlands) Roda JC	Undisclosed	
July 20, 2011	(Belgium) Yoni Buyens	(Belgium) KV Mechelen	(Belgium) Standard Liège	Undisclosed	
July 20, 2011	(Brazil) Victor Ramos	(Belgium) Standard Liège	(Brazil) Vasco da Gama	Loan	
July 21, 2011	(Uruguay) Nacho González	(Spain) Valencia	(Belgium) Standard Liège	Undisclosed	(Note: González was on loan from Valencia to Levante. The loan ended at the end of the 2010–11 season, after which he was sold to Standard.)
July 22, 2011	(France) Chris Makiese	(France) Laval	(Belgium) Mons	Undisclosed	
July 22, 2011	(France) Benjamin Nicaise	(Belgium) Lierse	(Belgium) Mons	Undisclosed	
July 22, 2011	(Egypt) Mohamed Abdel Wahed	(Belgium) Lierse	(Egypt) Wadi Degla	Free	
July 23, 2011	(Zimbabwe) Cephas Chimedza	(Belgium) Westerlo	(Belgium) Cappellen	Undisclosed	
July 23, 2011	(Serbia) Uroš Delić	(Serbia) Rad	(Belgium) Beerschot AC	Undisclosed	
July 23, 2011	(Belgium) Hendrik Van Crombrugge	(Belgium) Standard Liège	(Belgium) Sint-Truiden	Undisclosed	
July 24, 2011	(Netherlands) Luciano Dompig	(Netherlands) Almere	(Belgium) Cercle Brugge	Undisclosed	
July 24, 2011	(Bosnia and Herzegovina) Irfan Hadzić	(Bosnia and Herzegovina) Olimpik Sarajevo	(Belgium) Zulte Waregem	Undisclosed	
July 24, 2011	(Serbia) Nemanja Rnić	(Belgium) Anderlecht	(Serbia) Partizan	Undisclosed	
July 25, 2011	(Belgium) Stijn De Smet	(Belgium) AA Gent	(Belgium) Westerlo	Loan	
July 26, 2011	(Democratic Republic of the Congo) Landry Mulemo	(Turkey) Bucaspor	(Belgium) Kortrijk	Undisclosed	
July 27, 2011	(Democratic Republic of the Congo) Freddy Mombongo-Dues	(Belgium) Eupen	(Belgium) Mons	Undisclosed	
July 27, 2011	(Belgium) Laurent Henkinet	(Belgium) Sint-Truiden	(Belgium) Standard Liège	Undisclosed	
July 30, 2011	(Belgium) Jeroen Simaeys	(Belgium) Club Brugge	(Belgium) Racing Genk	Undisclosed	

=== August 2011 ===
Date	Name	Moving from	Moving to	Fee	Note
August 1, 2011	(Argentina) Pablo Chavarría	(Belgium) Anderlecht	(Belgium) Kortrijk	Loan	
August 1, 2011	(France) Wilfried Dalmat	(Belgium) Club Brugge	(Turkey) Orduspor	Undisclosed	
August 2, 2011	(Venezuela) Jésus Gómez	(Egypt) Wadi Degla	(Belgium) Lierse	Undisclosed	
August 2, 2011	(Serbia) Milan Jovanović	(England) Liverpool	(Belgium) Anderlecht	Undisclosed	
August 3, 2011	(Belgium) Yves De Winter	(Belgium) Westerlo	(Netherlands) De Graafschap	Undisclosed	
August 3, 2011	(France) Jérémy Perbet	(Belgium) Lokeren	(Belgium) Mons	€500 000	
August 4, 2011	(Belgium) Floribert N'Galula	(Finland) TPS Turku	(Belgium) OH Leuven	Undisclosed	
August 6, 2011	(Colombia) Daniel Cruz	(Belgium) Beerschot	(United States) Dallas	Undisclosed	
August 7, 2011	(Nigeria) Tosin Dosunmu	(Belgium) Beerschot	(Belgium) Antwerp	Free	
August 7, 2011	(Croatia) Antun Dunković	(Belgium) Mechelen	(Belgium) Antwerp	Free	
August 9, 2011	(Trinidad and Tobago) Khaleem Hyland	(Belgium) Zulte Waregem	(Belgium) Genk	Undisclosed	
August 9, 2011	(Democratic Republic of the Congo) Dieumerci Mbokani	(France) AS Monaco	(Belgium) Anderlecht	Undisclosed	(Note: Mbokani was on loan from AS Monaco to Wolfsburg during the second half of the 2010–11 season. The loan ended and he was sold to Anderlecht.)
August 9, 2011	(Belgium) Stijn Stijnen	Free agent	(Belgium) Beerschot	Free	
August 10, 2011	(Romania) Gheorghe Grozav	(Belgium) Standard Liège	(Romania) Universitatea Cluj	Loan	
August 10, 2011	(Belgium) Faris Haroun	(Belgium) Beerschot	(England) Middlesbrough	Undisclosed	
August 10, 2011	(Belgium) Jarno Molenberghs	(Belgium) Westerlo	(Belgium) Lommel United	Loan	
August 10, 2011	(Nigeria) Derick Ogbu	(Qatar) Umm Salal	(Belgium) OH Leuven	Undisclosed	
August 10, 2011	(Serbia) Dalibor Veselinović	(Belgium) Anderlecht	(Belgium) Kortrijk	Loan	
August 11, 2011	(Austria) Rubin Okotie	(Germany) Nuremberg II	(Belgium) Sint-Truiden	Loan	(Note: Okotie was on the verge of signing a contract with Mechelen, after already signing already an initial contract agreement. Apparently he changed his mind at the last moment and chose to sign for Sint-Truiden.)
August 12, 2011	(Egypt) Ashour El Takky	(Egypt) Wadi Degla	(Belgium) Lierse	Loan	(Note: On August 12, 2011, a loan agreement was made between Wadi Degla, Lierse and El Takky, to loan out the player for one season. However 4 days later, El Takky and Lierse mutually agreed to terminate the loan deal to allow the player to return to Egypt to deal with personal family issues.)
August 12, 2011	(Poland) Grzegorz Sandomierski	(Poland) Jagiellonia Białystok	(Belgium) Genk	Undisclosed	
August 15, 2011	(Belgium) Steven Defour	(Belgium) Standard Liège	(Portugal) Porto	€13 000 000	(Note: The transfer sum of € 13 000 000 includes the transfers of both Steven Defour and Eliaquim Mangala.)
August 15, 2011	(France) Eliaquim Mangala	(Belgium) Standard Liège	(Portugal) Porto	€13 000 000	
August 15, 2011	(Belgium) Pierre-Yves Ngawa	(Belgium) Standard Liège	(Belgium) Sint-Truiden	Loan	
August 16, 2011	(Egypt) Ashour El Takky	(Belgium) Lierse	(Egypt) Wadi Degla	Loan terminated	
August 18, 2011	(Belgium) Romelu Lukaku	(Belgium) Anderlecht	(England) Chelsea	Undisclosed	
August 18, 2011	(Spain) Melli	(Spain) Tenerife	(Belgium) Gent	Free	
August 18, 2011	(Belgium) Mike Van Hamel	(France) Le Havre	(Belgium) Westerlo	Undisclosed	
August 18, 2011	(Belgium) Stef Wils	(Belgium) Gent	(Belgium) Westerlo	Undisclosed	
August 19, 2011	(Israel) Maor Buzaglo	(Israel) Maccabi Tel Aviv	(Belgium) Standard Liège	Undisclosed	
August 19, 2011	(Belgium) Thomas Kaminski	(Belgium) Beerschot	(Belgium) OH Leuven	Undisclosed	(Note: Originally it was announced that Kaminski was to be sold by Beerschot and would move to Anderlecht, who would in turn loan him to another club during the first season. However it turned out that a transfer agreement was made between Beerschot and OH Leuven to sign Kaminski for one season, after which he will move to Anderlecht.)
August 22, 2011	(Belgium) Stijn Meert	(Belgium) Zulte Waregem	(Belgium) Mouscron-Péruwelz	Loan	
August 23, 2011	(Spain) Juande	(Spain) Betis	(Belgium) Westerlo	Undisclosed	(Note: Juande was on loan from Betis to Granada. The loan ended after which he was sold to Westerlo.)
August 24, 2011	(Romania) Denis Alibec	(Italy) Inter Milan	(Belgium) Mechelen	Loan	
August 24, 2011	(Belgium) Tom Soetaers	(Belgium) Mechelen	(Belgium) Wijgmaal	Free	
August 25, 2011	(Portugal) Sérgio Oliveira	(Portugal) Porto	(Belgium) Mechelen	Loan	
August 25, 2011	(Belarus) Mikhail Sivakov	(Italy) Cagliari	(Belgium) Zulte Waregem	Undisclosed	(Note: Sivakov was on loan from Cagliari to Wisła Kraków. The loan ended after which he was sold to Zulte Waregem.)
August 26, 2011	(Belgium) Jonathan Legear	(Belgium) Anderlecht	(Russia) Terek Grozny	Undisclosed	
August 27, 2011	(Belgium) Jérémy Serwy	(Belgium) Charleroi	(Belgium) Zulte Waregem	Undisclosed	
August 29, 2011	(Belgium) Arnor Angeli	(Belgium) Standard Liège	(Belgium) Beerschot	Loan	
August 29, 2011	(Belgium) Christian Benteke	(Belgium) Standard Liège	(Belgium) Genk	Undisclosed	
August 29, 2011	(Brazil) Rafinha	(Finland) Helsinki	(Belgium) Gent	Undisclosed	
August 30, 2011	(Morocco) Mehdi Carcela	(Belgium) Standard Liège	(Russia) Anzhi Makhachkala	Undisclosed	
August 30, 2011	(Czech Republic) Radek Dejmek	(Czech Republic) Slovan Liberec	(Belgium) OH Leuven	Loan	
August 30, 2011	(Belgium) Yannick Euvrard	(Belgium) OH Leuven	(Belgium) Roeselare	Undisclosed	
August 30, 2011	(Argentina) Abel Masuero	(Argentina) Gimnasia La Plata	(Belgium) Genk	Undisclosed	
August 30, 2011	(Senegal) Pape M'Bow	(France) Marseille	(Belgium) Mons	Loan	
August 30, 2011	(Senegal) Mohamed Sarr	(Spain) Hércules	(Belgium) Genk	Undisclosed	
August 30, 2011	(Venezuela) Luis Manuel Seijas	(Colombia) Santa Fe	(Belgium) Standard Liège	Undisclosed	
August 30, 2011	(France) William Vainqueur	(France) Nantes	(Belgium) Standard Liège	€1 700 000	
August 31, 2011	(Israel) Shlomi Arbeitman	(Belgium) Gent	(Belgium) Westerlo	Loan	
August 31, 2011	(Netherlands) Jeremy Bokila	(Belgium) Zulte Waregem	(Netherlands) Sparta	Loan	
August 31, 2011	(Morocco) Abdelfettah Boukhriss	(Belgium) Standard Liège	(Morocco) FUS Rabat	Loan	
August 31, 2011	(Belgium) Christian Brüls	(Belgium) Westerlo	(Belgium) Gent	Undisclosed	
August 31, 2011	(Russia) Dmitri Bulykin	(Belgium) Anderlecht	(Netherlands) Ajax	Undisclosed	
August 31, 2011	(Belgium) Koen Daerden	(Belgium) Standard Liège	(Belgium) Sint-Truiden	Loan	
August 31, 2011	(Belgium) Guy Dufour	(Belgium) Standard Liège	(Belgium) Antwerp	Loan	
August 31, 2011	(Belgium) Karel Geraerts	(Belgium) Club Brugge	(Belgium) OH Leuven	Free	
August 31, 2011	(Argentina) Leandro Grimi	(Portugal) Sporting	(Belgium) Genk	Loan	
August 31, 2011	(Niger) Ouwo Moussa Maazou	(Russia) CSKA Moscow	(Belgium) Zulte Waregem	Loan	
August 31, 2011	(Hungary) Balázs Tóth	(Belgium) Genk	Free agent	Released	
August 31, 2011	(Belgium) Glenn Verbauwhede	(Belgium) Club Brugge	Free agent	Released	
August 31, 2011	(Belgium) Davino Verhulst	(Belgium) Genk	Free agent	Released	
August 31, 2011	(Belgium) Denis Viane	(Belgium) Cercle Brugge	(Belgium) Antwerp	Loan	
August 31, 2011	(Czech Republic) Matej Vydra	(Italy) Udinese	(Belgium) Club Brugge	Loan	

=== September 2011 ===
Date	Name	Moving from	Moving to	Fee	Note
September 2, 2011	(Kenya) Collins Kisuya	(Kenya) AFC Leopards	(Belgium) Beerschot	Loan	
September 2, 2011	(Democratic Republic of the Congo) Mulopo Kudimbana	(Belgium) Anderlecht	(Belgium) Cercle Brugge	Free	(Note: Kudimbana was already on loan from Anderlecht to Cercle Brugge during the previous season. After the loan ended he was released by Anderlecht and allowed a free move to Cercle Brugge.)
September 2, 2011	(Paraguay) Rodrigo Rojas	(Paraguay) Libertad	(Belgium) Beerschot	Loan	
September 3, 2011	(Belgium) Stein Huysegems	(Belgium) Genk	(Belgium) Lierse	Free	
September 7, 2011	(Belgium) Jeanvion Yulu-Matondo	Free agent	(Belgium) Westerlo	Free	

== Sorted by team ==
=== AA Gent ===
In:

No.	Pos.	Nation	Player
—	MF	BEL	Christian Brüls (from (Belgium) Westerlo)
—	MF	BEL	Kyliaan Butsraen (from (Belgium) Oostende)
—	DF	ESP	Melli (from (Spain) Tenerife)
—	DF	BDI	Valery Nahayo (from (South Africa) Kaizer Chiefs)
—	MF	MLI	Mamoutou N'Diaye (loan return from (Belgium) Mons)
—	GK	NED	Sergio Padt (from (Netherlands) Ajax)
—	MF	BEL	Sebastien Phiri (loan return from (Belgium) Brussels)
—	DF	BRA	Rafinha (from (Finland) Helsinki)
—	FW	FRA	Medhi Terki (from (Belgium) Mons)
—	DF	BEL	Jef Vogels (from (Belgium) Antwerp)

Out:

No.	Pos.	Nation	Player
6	DF	BEL	Stef Wils (to (Belgium) Westerlo)
19	FW	BEL	Stijn De Smet (on loan to (Belgium) Westerlo)
23	FW	ISR	Shlomi Arbeitman (on loan to (Belgium) Westerlo)
—	DF	MLI	Kassim Doumbia (to (Belgium) Waasland-Beveren, was on loan to (Belgium) Brussels)

=== Anderlecht ===
In:

No.	Pos.	Nation	Player
4	DF	BRA	Samuel (from (Germany) Werder Bremen)
6	DF	BRA	Diogo (on loan from (Brazil) São Paulo)
7	FW	SWE	Guillermo Molins (from (Sweden) Malmö)
8	DF	BEL	Denis Odoi (from (Belgium) Sint-Truiden)
11	FW	SRB	Milan Jovanović (from (England) Liverpool)
12	MF	BEL	Thomas Chatelle (loan return from (Netherlands) NEC Nijmegen)
15	DF	SEN	Abdoulaye Seck (from (Senegal) Niarry-Tally, was already on loan)
17	MF	UKR	Oleksandr Yakovenko (loan return from (Belgium) Westerlo)
20	MF	SWE	Behrang Safari (from (Switzerland) Basel)
25	FW	COD	Dieumerci Mbokani (from (France) AS Monaco)
29	FW	RUS	Dmitri Bulykin (loan return from (Netherlands) ADO Den Haag)
38	FW	COD	Junior Kabananga (loan return from (Belgium) Beerschot)
70	MF	VEN	Ronald Vargas (from (Belgium) Club Brugge)
77	MF	BRA	Reynaldo (loan return from (Belgium) Cercle Brugge)
—	MF	BEL	Massimo Bruno (from (Belgium) Charleroi)
—	DF	COD	Chancel Mbemba Mangulu (on loan from (Democratic Republic of the Congo) FC MK)
—	FW	BEL	Olivier Mukendi (loan return from (Belgium) Union)

Out:

No.	Pos.	Nation	Player
7	DF	CZE	Jan Lecjaks (loan return to (Czech Republic) Viktoria Plzeň)
13	MF	BEL	Jonathan Legear (to (Russia) Terek Grozny)
14	FW	BEL	Romelu Lukaku (to (England) Chelsea)
25	FW	ARG	Pablo Chavarría (on loan to (Belgium) Kortrijk, was on loan to (Belgium) Eupen)
26	DF	HON	Víctor Bernárdez (on loan to (Mexico) Ciudad Juárez, was on loan to (Belgium) Lierse)
29	FW	RUS	Dmitri Bulykin (to (Netherlands) Ajax)
31	DF	BEL	Arnaud De Greef (to (Belgium) Westerlo)
32	MF	SEN	Christophe Diandy (on loan to (Belgium) OH Leuven)
37	MF	BEL	Jordan Garcia Calvete (on loan to (Belgium) Sint-Truiden)
87	FW	SRB	Dalibor Veselinović (on loan to (Belgium) Kortrijk)
—	GK	COD	Mulopo Kudimbana (to (Belgium) Cercle Brugge)
—	DF	BEL	Birger Longueville (to (Belgium) Roeselare)
—	MF	ARG	Hernán Losada (to (Belgium) Beerschot, was on loan to (Belgium) Charleroi)
—	DF	SRB	Nemanja Rnić (to (Serbia) Partizan, was on loan to (Belgium) Beerschot)
—	GK	BEL	Stefan Roef (to (Belgium) Westerlo)
—	FW	CMR	Sébastien Siani (to (Belgium) Brussels, was already on loan)
—	MF	BEL	René Sterckx (on loan to (Belgium) Zulte Waregem, was already on loan)
—	FW	ENG	Paul Taylor (to (England) Peterborough United)
—	FW	BEL	Bigen Yala Lusala (on loan to (Belgium) Lokeren)

=== Beerschot ===
Note: until 17 May 2011, the club was officially known as Germinal Beerschot, but at that date the name was changed to Beerschot AC.

In:

No.	Pos.	Nation	Player
4	DF	URU	Gary Kagelmacher (from (Spain) Real Madrid Castilla, was already on loan)
—	MF	BEL	Arnor Angeli (on loan from (Belgium) Standard Liège)
—	FW	ISR	Roei Dayan (from (Israel) Hapoel Acre)
—	MF	SRB	Uroš Delić (from (Serbia) Rad)
—	DF	COD	Trésor Diowo (from (Belgium) Tubize)
—	DF	ISL	Jón Guðni Fjóluson (from (Iceland) Fram)
—	MF	NGR	Sani Kaita (from (France) AS Monaco)
—	MF	KEN	Collins Kisuya (on loan from (Kenya) AFC Leopards)
—	MF	ARG	Hernán Losada (from (Belgium) Anderlecht)
—	MF	ISR	Dor Malul (on loan from (Israel) Maccabi Tel Aviv)
—	DF	BEL	Roy Mauro (loan return from (Belgium) Turnhout)
—	MF	RSA	Lindani Ntamo (from (South Africa) ASD Cape Town)
—	DF	RSA	Sive Phekezela (from (South Africa) ASD Cape Town)
—	MF	PAR	Rodrigo Rojas (on loan from (Paraguay) Libertad)
—	FW	SEN	Ibrahima Sidibe (from (Belgium) Sint-Truiden)
—	GK	BEL	Stijn Stijnen (free agent)
—	DF	BEL	Peter Van Der Heyden (from (Belgium) Club Brugge)
—	DF	BEL	Dries Wuytens (from (Netherlands) PSV)

Out:

No.	Pos.	Nation	Player
3	DF	SRB	Nemanja Rnić (loan return to (Belgium) Anderlecht)
5	DF	BEL	Pieterjan Monteyne (to (Belgium) Mons)
7	DF	BEL	Philippe Clement (retired)
9	FW	BEL	Faris Haroun (to (England) Middlesbrough)
10	MF	COL	Daniel Cruz (to (United States) Dallas)
22	DF	BEL	Martijn Monteyne (to (Netherlands) Roda JC)
26	GK	BEL	Thomas Kaminski (to (Belgium) Anderlecht)
27	FW	COD	Junior Kabananga (loan return to (Belgium) Anderlecht)
29	MF	CMR	Justice Wamfor (Free Agent)
86	MF	BEL	Mats Rits (to (Netherlands) Ajax)
—	MF	BEL	Mark De Man (Free Agent, was on loan to (Belgium) OH Leuven)
—	FW	NGR	Tosin Dosunmu (released to (Belgium) Antwerp, was on loan to (Netherlands) MVV)
—	DF	BEL	Matti Van Minnebruggen (to (Belgium) Waasland-Beveren, was already on loan)

=== Cercle Brugge ===
In:

No.	Pos.	Nation	Player
19	DF	POR	Nuno Reis (loan agreement with (Portugal) Sporting renewed)
21	MF	BRA	Renato Neto (loan agreement with (Portugal) Sporting renewed)
26	MF	BEL	Kevin Packet (loan return from (Belgium) Coxyde)
—	FW	POR	Amido Baldé (on loan from (Portugal) Sporting)
—	FW	BEL	Brecht Delbeke (loan return from (Netherlands) Hoek)
—	MF	NED	Luciano Dompig (from (Netherlands) Almere)
—	FW	BEL	Kevin Janssens (from (Belgium) Lierse)
—	GK	COD	Mulopo Kudimbana (from (Belgium) Anderlecht)
—	FW	POR	Rudy (from Atlético Clube de Portugal)

Out:

No.	Pos.	Nation	Player
7	DF	BEL	Denis Viane (on loan to (Belgium) Antwerp)
12	MF	BEL	Frederik Boi (to (Belgium) OH Leuven)
14	MF	UKR	Serhiy Serebrennikov (to (Belgium) Roeselare)
18	MF	BRA	Reynaldo (loan return to (Belgium) Anderlecht)
23	FW	MNE	Milan Purovic (loan return to Sporting Portugal)
38	FW	GHA	William Owusu (loan return to (Portugal) Sporting)
—	MF	BEL	Jonas Buyse (on loan to (Belgium) Woluwe-Zaventem, was on loan to (Belgium) Roeselare)
—	GK	BEL	Rubin Dantschotter (on loan to (Netherlands) Sparta, was on loan to (Belgium) KV Oostende)
—	FW	SEN	Papa Sene (on loan to (Belgium) Roeselare)
—	GK	BEL	Cédric Vanhee (to (Belgium) Torhout)

=== Club Brugge ===
In:

No.	Pos.	Nation	Player
2	DF	NOR	Tom Høgli (from (Norway) Tromsø)
3	DF	SWE	Michael Almebäck (from (Sweden) Örebro)
5	DF	SWE	Fredrik Stenman (from (Netherlands) Groningen)
6	MF	DEN	Niki Zimling (from (Italy) Udinese, was on loan to (Netherlands) NEC Nijmegen)
8	MF	ISR	Lior Refaelov (from (Israel) Maccabi Haifa)
9	FW	BEL	Björn Vleminckx (from (Netherlands) NEC Nijmegen)
13	MF	ESP	Víctor Vázquez (from (Spain) Barcelona B)
14	FW	CZE	Matej Vydra (on loan from (Italy) Udinese)
19	FW	BEL	Thomas Meunier (from (Belgium) Virton)
21	DF	BEL	Pietro Perdichizzi (from (Belgium) Charleroi)
33	GK	SRB	Vladan Kujović (from (Netherlands) Willem II)
—	FW	SRB	Stefan Šćepović (loan return from (Belgium) Kortrijk)
—	DF	BRA	Cleber Sonda (loan return from (Belgium) Roeselare)

Out:

No.	Pos.	Nation	Player
3	DF	BEL	Peter Van Der Heyden (to (Belgium) Beerschot)
7	MF	FRA	Wilfried Dalmat (to (Turkey) Orduspor)
13	GK	BEL	Geert De Vlieger (retired)
14	DF	BEL	Jeroen Simaeys (to (Belgium) Racing Genk)
20	MF	VEN	Ronald Vargas (to (Belgium) Anderlecht)
21	DF	BEL	Jorn Vermeulen (to (Belgium) OH Leuven)
22	MF	BEL	Karel Geraerts (to (Belgium) OH Leuven)
25	DF	CRC	Júnior Díaz (on loan to (Poland) Wisła Kraków)
40	FW	CMR	Dorge Kouemaha (on loan to (Germany) 1. FC Kaiserslautern)
44	MF	CRO	Ivan Perišić (to (Germany) Borussia Dortmund)
47	FW	BEL	Laurens Vandenheede (to (Belgium) Dender)
48	MF	BEL	Jeffrey Christiaens (to (Belgium) Torhout)
—	MF	BEL	Gertjan De Mets (to (Belgium) Kortrijk, was already on loan)
—	MF	BEL	Roy Meeus (to (Belgium) Lommel United, was on loan to (Belgium) Dender)
—	GK	BEL	Glenn Verbauwhede (Free Agent, was on loan to (Belgium) Kortrijk)

=== Kortrijk ===
In:

No.	Pos.	Nation	Player
10	FW	CMR	Ernest Nfor (from (Belgium) Zulte Waregem)
16	GK	RSA	Darren Keet (from (South Africa) Bidvest Wits)
17	MF	BEL	Gertjan De Mets (from (Belgium) Club Brugge, was already on loan)
23	DF	BIH	Ervin Zukanović (from (Belgium) Eupen)
25	DF	ISR	Rami Gershon (loan from (Belgium) Standard Liège renewed)
—	FW	ARG	Pablo Chavarría (on loan from (Belgium) Anderlecht)
—	MF	HUN	Péter Czvitkovics (from (Hungary) Debrecen)
—	FW	FRA	Steeven Joseph-Monrose (from (France) Lens)
—	DF	COD	Landry Mulemo (from (Turkey) Bucaspor)
—	MF	SEN	Ismaïla N'Diaye (from (France) Caen)
—	DF	BEL	David Vandenbroeck (on loan from (Belgium) Zulte Waregem)
—	GK	BEL	Kristof Van Hout (from (Belgium) Standard Liège)
—	FW	SRB	Dalibor Veselinović (on loan from (Belgium) Anderlecht)
—	DF	BEL	David Wijns (from (Belgium) Heist)

Out:

No.	Pos.	Nation	Player
4	DF	BIH	Toni Sunjic (loan return to (Bosnia and Herzegovina) Zrinjski Mostar)
5	DF	FRA	Karim Belhocine (to (Belgium) Standard Liège)
7	FW	BEL	Monsef Znagui (to (Belgium) Racing Waregem)
9	FW	BEL	Giuseppe Rossini (to (Belgium) Zulte Waregem)
10	MF	BEL	Sven Kums (to (Netherlands) Heerenveen)
12	FW	GAM	Ibou Savaneh (was on loan to (Belgium) KV Mechelen, now on loan to (Belgium) Mons)
13	GK	BEL	Glenn Verbauwhede (loan return to (Belgium) Club Brugge)
14	MF	BEL	Davy De Beule (to (Netherlands) Roda JC)
19	FW	SRB	Stefan Šćepović (loan return to (Belgium) Club Brugge)
24	GK	BEL	Tom Vandenbossche (to (Belgium) Dender)
30	GK	BEL	Damien Lahaye (to (Belgium) Tubize)
—	FW	FRA	Cédric Bétrémieux (to (France) Fréjus-Saint-Raphaël, was on loan to (Belgium) Mouscron-Péruwelz)

=== KV Mechelen ===
In:

No.	Pos.	Nation	Player
11	FW	BEL	Kevin Vandenbergh (from (Belgium) Eupen)
12	FW	COL	Jaime Ruiz (from (Belgium) Westerlo)
14	MF	ISR	Liroy Zhairi (from (Israel) Bnei Yehuda)
22	MF	BEL	Robin Henkens (from (Belgium) Lommel United)
29	MF	BEL	Alessandro Cordaro (from (Belgium) Charleroi)
—	FW	ROU	Denis Alibec (on loan from (Italy) Inter Milan)
—	FW	BEL	Raoul Avansey (loan return from (Belgium) Rupel Boom)
—	MF	GUI	Tidiane Kourouma (loan return from (Belgium) Rupel Boom)
—	MF	POR	Sérgio Oliveira (on loan from (Portugal) Porto)

Out:

No.	Pos.	Nation	Player
1	GK	BEL	Yannick Thoelen (on loan to (Belgium) Lommel United)
2	DF	BEL	Jérémy Huyghebaert (on loan to (Belgium) Roeselare)
7	MF	BEL	Tom Soetaers (to (Belgium) Wijgmaal)
11	FW	GAM	Ebrahim Savaneh (loan return to (Belgium) Kortrijk)
13	MF	CRO	Antun Dunković (loan return to (Belgium) Antwerp)
14	FW	BEL	Christian Benteke (loan return to (Belgium) Standard Liège)
17	MF	BEL	Yoni Buyens (to (Belgium) Standard Liège)
22	DF	BEL	Romeo Van Dessel (on loan to (Belgium) Antwerp)
27	FW	BEL	Christian Kabasele (loan return to (Belgium) Eupen)
—	DF	BEL	Zinho Chergui (loan return from (Belgium) Roeselare, now on loan to (Belgium) Antwerp)
—	MF	BEL	Joren Dom (to (Belgium) Dender, was on loan to (Belgium) Rupel Boom)
—	MF	BEL	Laurens Paulussen (on loan to (Belgium) Waasland-Beveren, was already on loan)

=== Lierse ===
In:

No.	Pos.	Nation	Player
8	FW	MAR	Soufiane Bidaoui (from (Belgium) Westerlo)
—	FW	VEN	Jésus Gómez (from (Egypt) Wadi Degla)
—	DF	MKD	Boban Grnčarov (from (Cyprus) APOEL)
—	FW	BEL	Stein Huysegems (from (Belgium) Genk)
—	DF	TUN	Karim Saidi (from (France) Tours)

Out:

No.	Pos.	Nation	Player
5	DF	HON	Víctor Bernárdez (loan return to (Belgium) Anderlecht)
13	FW	CAN	Tomasz Radzinski (contract ended)
20	MF	EGY	Mohamed Abdel Wahed (to (Egypt) Wadi Degla)
28	MF	FRA	Benjamin Nicaise (to (Belgium) Mons)
—	DF	BEL	Timothy Dreesen (to (Netherlands) Fortuna Sittard)
—	MF	EGY	Ashour El Takky (loan return to (Egypt) Wadi Degla)
—	FW	BEL	Kevin Janssens (to (Belgium) Cercle Brugge, was on loan to (Belgium) Turnhout)

=== Lokeren ===
In:

No.	Pos.	Nation	Player
—	FW	TUN	Hamdi Harbaoui (from (Belgium) OH Leuven)
—	FW	BEL	Bigen Yala Lusala (on loan from (Belgium) Anderlecht)

Out:

No.	Pos.	Nation	Player
24	FW	SYR	Senharib Malki (loan return from (Greece) Panthrakikos, now sold to (Netherlands) Roda JC)
—	FW	FRA	Jérémy Perbet (to (Belgium) Mons, was already on loan, now sold)

=== Mons ===
In:

No.	Pos.	Nation	Player
4	DF	BEL	Peter Franquart (from (France) Lille)
17	MF	BEL	Quentin Pottiez (from (France) Lens)
23	MF	MAR	Rachid Bourabia (from (Belgium) Waasland-Beveren)
45	DF	BEL	Pieterjan Monteyne (from (Belgium) Beerschot)
—	FW	FRA	Chris Makiese (from (France) Laval)
—	MF	SEN	Pape M'Bow (on loan from (France) Marseille)
—	FW	COD	Freddy Mombongo-Dues (from (Belgium) Eupen)
—	MF	FRA	Benjamin Nicaise (from (Belgium) Lierse)
—	FW	FRA	Jérémy Perbet (from (Belgium) Lokeren, was already on loan, now bought)
—	FW	GAM	Ibou Savaneh (on loan from (Belgium) Kortrijk)
—	GK	BEL	Olivier Werner (from (Belgium) Eupen)

Out:

No.	Pos.	Nation	Player
4	DF	BEL	Brecht Verbrugghe (to (Belgium) Tournai)
7	FW	GAM	Mustapha Jarju (to (Canada) Vancouver Whitecaps)
12	FW	FRA	Medhi Terki (to (Belgium) AA Gent)
13	MF	MLI	Mamoutou N'Diaye (loan return to (Belgium) AA Gent)
—	DF	BEL	Franz Dieu (to (Belgium) Boussu Dour)

=== OH Leuven ===
In:

No.	Pos.	Nation	Player
2	MF	BEL	Frederik Boi (from (Belgium) Cercle Brugge)
9	FW	SWE	Patrick Amoah (from (Belgium) WS Woluwe)
10	FW	BEL	Kevin Roelandts (from (Belgium) Zulte Waregem)
14	MF	BEL	Thomas Azevedo (from (Belgium) Lommel United)
16	DF	BEL	Jorn Vermeulen (from (Belgium) Club Brugge)
18	MF	BEL	Floribert N'Galula (from (Finland) TPS Turku)
20	MF	BEL	Karel Geraerts (to (Belgium) Club Brugge)
22	MF	BEL	Emmerik De Vriese (from (Belgium) Antwerp)
23	FW	NGR	Derick Ogbu (from (Qatar) Umm Salal)
24	DF	CZE	Radek Dejmek (on loan from (Czech Republic) Slovan Liberec)
25	MF	SEN	Christophe Diandy (on loan from (Belgium) Anderlecht)
26	GK	BEL	Thomas Kaminski (from (Belgium) Beerschot)

Out:

No.	Pos.	Nation	Player
2	DF	BEL	Yannick Euvrard (to (Belgium) Roeselare)
9	FW	BEL	Kurt Weuts (loan return to (Belgium) Sint-Truiden)
14	MF	BEL	Pieter Beckers (to (Belgium) RC Mechelen)
20	FW	TUN	Hamdi Harbaoui (to (Belgium) Lokeren)
24	MF	BEL	Wouter Scheelen (loan return to (Belgium) Westerlo)
—	MF	BEL	Mark De Man (loan return to (Belgium) Beerschot)

=== Racing Genk ===
In:

No.	Pos.	Nation	Player
1	GK	POL	Grzegorz Sandomierski (from (Poland) Jagiellonia Białystok)
7	MF	TTO	Khaleem Hyland (from (Belgium) Zulte Waregem)
17	DF	BEL	Jeroen Simaeys (from (Belgium) Club Brugge)
—	FW	BEL	Christian Benteke (from (Belgium) Standard Liège)
—	DF	ARG	Leandro Grimi (on loan from (Portugal) Sporting)
—	DF	ARG	Abel Masuero (from (Argentina) Gimnasia La Plata)
—	DF	SEN	Mohamed Sarr (from (Spain) Hércules)

Out:

No.	Pos.	Nation	Player
2	DF	BEL	Dimitri Daeseleire (to (Belgium) Sint-Truiden)
5	DF	CMR	Eric Matoukou (to (Ukraine) Dnipro Dnipropetrovsk)
17	DF	FRA	Chris Mavinga (loan return to (England) Liverpool, then moved to (France) Rennes)
25	GK	BEL	Koen Casteels (to (Germany) TSG 1899 Hoffenheim)
28	GK	BEL	Thibaut Courtois (to (England) Chelsea)
—	FW	BEL	Stein Huysegems (to (Belgium) Lierse)
—	MF	HUN	Balázs Tóth (released)
—	GK	BEL	Davino Verhulst (released)

=== Sint-Truiden ===
In:

No.	Pos.	Nation	Player
8	MF	ITA	Alessandro Iandoli (from (Belgium) Eupen)
9	MF	BEL	Jordan Garcia Calvete (on loan from (Belgium) Anderlecht)
10	FW	BRA	Bruno Andrade (from (Netherlands) Helmond Sport)
14	DF	BEL	Dimitri Daeseleire (from (Belgium) Racing Genk)
15	DF	BEL	Kevin Taelemans (from (Belgium) Overijse)
16	MF	BEL	Jeroen Appeltans (loan return from (Belgium) Grimbergen)
19	FW	CZE	Ondřej Smetana (from (Slovakia) Senica)
22	MF	FRA	Gregory Christ (loan return from (Greece) Panthrakikos)
23	DF	BEL	Benoit Masset (loan return from (Belgium) Grimbergen)
28	FW	IRI	Reza Ghoochannejhad (from (Netherlands) Cambuur)
—	MF	BEL	Koen Daerden (on loan from (Belgium) Standard Liège)
—	DF	BEL	Pierre-Yves Ngawa (on loan from (Belgium) Standard Liège)
—	FW	AUT	Rubin Okotie (on loan from (Germany) Nuremberg II)
—	GK	BEL	Hendrik Van Crombrugge (from (Belgium) Standard Liège)

Out:

No.	Pos.	Nation	Player
8	DF	BEL	Denis Odoi (to (Belgium) Anderlecht)
9	MF	BEL	Andrea Mutombo (loan return to (Belgium) Standard Liège)
10	FW	HUN	Tibor Tisza (loan return to (Hungary) Újpest)
14	DF	BEL	Marc Wagemakers (to (Netherlands) Fortuna Sittard)
19	FW	SEN	Ibrahima Sidibe (to (Belgium) Beerschot)
20	FW	NGR	Manasseh Ishiaku (loan return to (Germany) 1. FC Köln)
22	GK	BEL	Sven Van Der Jeugt (end of contract)
—	GK	BEL	Laurent Henkinet (to (Belgium) Standard Liège)
—	FW	BEL	Kurt Weuts (to (Belgium) Heist, was on loan to (Belgium) OH Leuven)

=== Standard Liège ===
In:

No.	Pos.	Nation	Player
3	DF	FRA	Karim Belhocine (from (Belgium) Kortrijk)
9	FW	BEL	Christian Benteke (loan return from (Belgium) KV Mechelen)
14	MF	URU	Nacho González (from (Spain) Valencia)
17	MF	BEL	Yoni Buyens (from (Belgium) KV Mechelen)
28	MF	BEL	Geoffrey Mujangi Bia (from (England) Wolverhampton)
—	DF	BEL	Dino Arslanagic (from (France) Lille)
—	MF	BRA	Edenilson Bergonsi (from (Belgium) Brussels)
—	MF	ISR	Maor Buzaglo (from (Israel) Maccabi Tel Aviv)
—	GK	BEL	Laurent Henkinet (from (Belgium) Sint-Truiden)
—	MF	BEL	Paul-Jose M'Poku (from (England) Tottenham Hotspur)
—	MF	BEL	Andrea Mutombo (loan return from (Belgium) Sint-Truiden)
—	MF	VEN	Luis Manuel Seijas (from (Venezuela) Santa Fe)
—	FW	CIV	Moussa Traoré (loan return from (Belgium) Zulte Waregem)
—	MF	FRA	William Vainqueur (from (France) Nantes)

Out:

No.	Pos.	Nation	Player
1	GK	BEL	Kristof Van Hout (to (Belgium) Kortrijk)
3	DF	BRA	Victor Ramos (on loan to (Brazil) Vasco da Gama)
8	MF	BEL	Steven Defour (to (Portugal) Porto)
9	FW	BEL	Christian Benteke (to (Belgium) Genk)
9	FW	BEL	Luigi Pieroni (to (France) Arles-Avignon)
11	MF	MAR	Mehdi Carcela (to (Russia) Anzhi Makhachkala)
22	DF	FRA	Eliaquim Mangala (to (Portugal) Porto)
23	MF	BEL	Tom De Mul (loan return to (Spain) Sevilla)
24	MF	BEL	Koen Daerden (on loan to (Belgium) Sint-Truiden)
27	MF	BEL	Arnor Angeli (on loan to (Belgium) Beerschot)
28	MF	BEL	Axel Witsel (to (Portugal) Benfica)
32	DF	BEL	Christopher Verbist (to (Belgium) Charleroi)
77	FW	ROU	Gheorghe Grozav (on loan to (Romania) Universitatea Cluj)
—	DF	MAR	Abdelfettah Boukhriss (on loan to (Morocco) FUS Rabat)
—	MF	BEL	Guy Dufour (signed from (Belgium) Lommel United, then loaned to (Belgium) Antwerp)
—	DF	ISR	Rami Gershon (again on loan to (Belgium) Kortrijk)
—	DF	BEL	Pierre-Yves Ngawa (on loan to (Belgium) Sint-Truiden)
—	GK	BEL	Hendrik Van Crombrugge (to (Belgium) Sint-Truiden)

=== Westerlo ===
In:

No.	Pos.	Nation	Player
2	DF	BEL	Arnaud De Greef (from (Belgium) Anderlecht)
11	FW	BRA	Marcao (from (Brazil) Ferroviária)
14	FW	BRA	Rômulo (from (Brazil) Brasiliense)
19	FW	BEL	Stijn De Smet (on loan from (Belgium) Gent)
29	GK	BEL	Stefan Roef (from (Belgium) Anderlecht)
—	FW	ISR	Shlomi Arbeitman (on loan from (Belgium) Gent)
—	MF	ESP	Juande (from (Spain) Betis)
—	FW	GHA	William Owusu (on loan from (Portugal) Sporting)
—	GK	BEL	Mike Van Hamel (from (France) Le Havre)
—	DF	BEL	Stef Wils (from (Belgium) AA Gent)
—	FW	BEL	Jeanvion Yulu-Matondo (signed as free agent)

Out:

No.	Pos.	Nation	Player
1	GK	BEL	Yves De Winter (to (Netherlands) De Graafschap)
8	MF	BEL	Christian Brüls (to (Belgium) Gent)
11	FW	PER	Daniel Chávez (to (Romania) Oţelul Galaţi)
12	FW	BRA	Paulo Henrique (loan return to (Brazil) Desportivo Brasil)
17	MF	UKR	Oleksandr Yakovenko (loan return to (Belgium) Anderlecht)
17	MF	RSA	Elrio van Heerden (contracted ended)
19	FW	COL	Jaime Ruiz (to (Belgium) KV Mechelen)
23	MF	BEL	Jarno Molenberghs (on loan to (Belgium) Lommel United)
27	DF	BIH	Adnan Mravac (to (Austria) Mattersburg)
—	FW	MAR	Soufiane Bidaoui (to (Belgium) Lierse, was on loan to (Belgium) Roeselare)
—	MF	ZIM	Cephas Chimedza (to (Belgium) Cappellen)
—	MF	BEL	Wouter Scheelen (loan return from (Belgium) OH Leuven, now on loan to (Netherlands) Fortuna Sittard)

=== Zulte Waregem ===
In:

No.	Pos.	Nation	Player
4	DF	BEL	Davy De Fauw (from (Netherlands) Roda)
6	MF	BEL	René Sterckx (on loan from (Belgium) Anderlecht, was already on loan)
8	MF	DEN	Brian Hamalainen (from (Denmark) Lyngby)
10	FW	MKD	Aleksandar Trajkovski (from (Croatia) Inter Zaprešić)
11	FW	SRB	Luka Milunović (from (Serbia) OFK Beograd)
16	MF	ISL	Ólafur Ingi Skúlason (from (Denmark) SønderjyskE)
17	MF	BLR	Mikhail Sivakov (from (Italy) Cagliari)
18	FW	BIH	Irfan Hadzić (from (Bosnia and Herzegovina) Olimpik Sarajevo)
19	FW	BEL	Giuseppe Rossini (from (Belgium) Kortrijk)
21	FW	NIG	Ouwo Moussa Maazou (on loan from (Russia) CSKA Moscow)
29	MF	BEL	Jérémy Serwy (from (Belgium) Charleroi)

Out:

No.	Pos.	Nation	Player
4	DF	BEL	David Vandenbroeck (on loan to (Belgium) Kortrijk)
6	MF	BEL	Ludwin Van Nieuwenhuyze (to (Belgium) Oudenaarde)
8	FW	BEL	Kevin Roelandts (to (Belgium) OH Leuven)
10	FW	CMR	Ernest Nfor (to (Belgium) Kortrijk)
11	MF	BEL	Stijn Meert (on loan to (Belgium) Mouscron-Péruwelz)
14	FW	NED	Jeremy Bokila (on loan to (Netherlands) Sparta)
18	FW	CIV	Moussa Traoré (loan return to (Belgium) Standard Liège)
21	MF	TTO	Khaleem Hyland (to (Belgium) Genk)
