= 2007 Belgian Super Cup =

Anderlecht	Club Brugge
3	1
- Date: 28 July 2007
- Venue: Constant Vanden Stock Stadium, Anderlecht
- Referee: Johan Verbist

The 2007 Belgian Super Cup was a football match played between 2006–07 Belgian First Division champions R.S.C. Anderlecht and 2006–07 Belgian Cup winners Club Brugge. It took place on 28 July 2007, in Anderlecht.

== Match details ==
2007-07-28
20:45 CET

Anderlecht	3–1	Club Brugge
Boussoufa 4'; Mpenza 37'; Hassan 87'		Đokić 48'

Constant Vanden Stock Stadium, Anderlecht
Attendance: 14,000
Referee: Johan Verbist (Belgium)

Anderlecht	Club Brugge

RSC ANDERLECHT:
GK	1	(Czech Republic) Daniel Zítka
DF	3	(Belgium) Olivier Deschacht (c)
MF	5	(Argentina) Lucas Biglia	(yellow card) 73'	(substituted off) 90'
DF	6	(Belgium) Jelle Van Damme
FW	7	(Democratic Republic of the Congo) Mohammed Tchité		(substituted off) 85'
FW	9	(Belgium) Mbo Mpenza		(substituted off) 68'
MF	10	(Egypt) Ahmed Hassan
MF	11	(Morocco) Mbark Boussoufa	(yellow card) 45'	(substituted off) 90'
DF	23	(Hungary) Roland Juhász
DF	26	(Argentina) Nicolás Pareja
DF	27	(Poland) Marcin Wasilewski
Substitutes:
GK	13	(Belgium) Silvio Proto
MF	14	(Belgium) Bart Goor		(substituted on) 68'
FW	15	(France) Cyril Théréau		(substituted on) 85'
MF	31	(Belgium) Mark De Man		(substituted on) 90'
FW	38	(Belgium) Roland Lamah		(substituted on) 90'
Manager:
(Belgium) Franky Vercauteren Man of the Match: Mbark Boussoufa

CLUB BRUGGE KV:
GK	1	(Belgium) Stijn Stijnen
DF	4	(Belgium) Joos Valgaeren	(yellow card) 41'
DF	5	(Canada) Michael Klukowski
DF	6	(Belgium) Philippe Clement (c)
MF	8	(Belgium) Gaëtan Englebert	(yellow card) 12'	(substituted off) 46'
FW	10	(Croatia) Boško Balaban		(substituted off) 46'
DF	15	(Czech Republic) Stepan Kucera		(substituted off) 64'
MF	18	(Croatia) Ivan Leko		(substituted off) 46'
MF	22	(Belgium) Karel Geraerts
FW	23	(Belgium) François Sterchele	(yellow card) 73'
DF	24	(Denmark) Brian Priske		(substituted off) 46'
Substitutes:
MF	3	(Belgium) Sven Vermant		(substituted on) 75'
MF	7	(Belgium) Koen Daerden		(substituted on) 46'
FW	9	(Serbia) Dušan Đokić		(substituted on) 46'
MF	11	(Belgium) Jonathan Blondel		(substituted on) 46'
GK	13	(Belgium) Glenn Verbauwhede
DF	26	(Belgium) Birger Maertens		(substituted on) 46'
DF	29	(Belgium) Gertjan De Mets	(yellow card) 72'	(substituted on) 64' (substituted off) 75'
Manager:
(Belgium) Jacky Mathijssen

== See also ==
- 2007–08 Belgian First Division
- 2007–08 Belgian Cup
- R.S.C. Anderlecht–Club Brugge KV rivalry
