= Karel Geraerts =

Belgian football manager (born 1982)

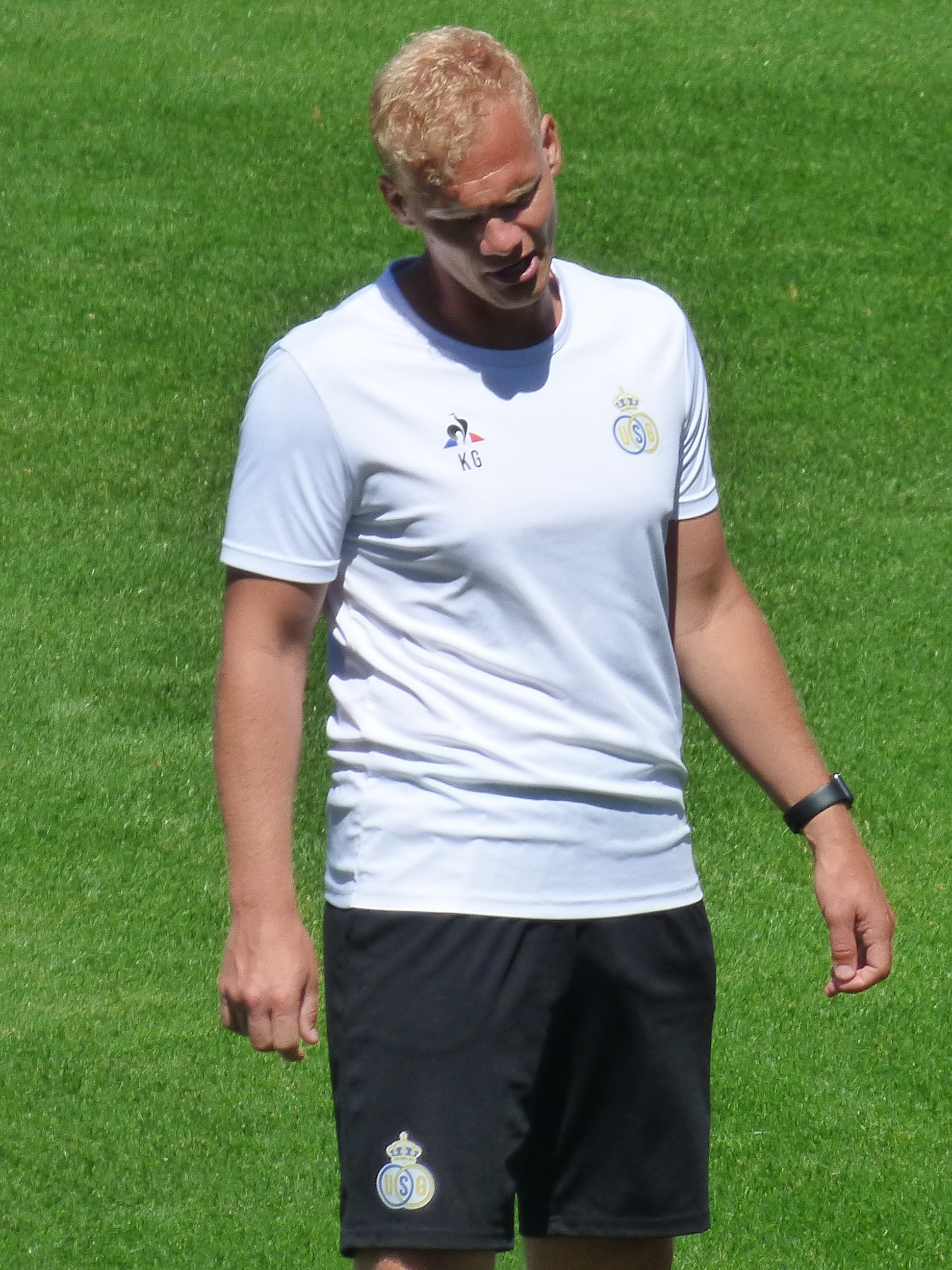

Personal information
- Date of birth: 5 January 1982 (age 44)
- Place of birth: Genk, Belgium
- Height: 1.86 m (6 ft 1 in)
- Position: Central midfielder

Senior career*
Years	Team	Apps	(Gls)
2000–2004	Club Brugge	9	(0)
2004	→ Lokeren (loan)	16	(0)
2004–2007	Standard Liège	93	(16)
2007–2011	Club Brugge	119	(15)
2011–2014	OH Leuven	79	(13)
2014–2016	Charleroi	32	(2)
Total		348	(46)

International career
2005–2009	Belgium	20	(4)

Managerial career
- 2022–2023: Union SG
- 2023–2024: Schalke 04
- 2025–2026: Reims
- * Club domestic league appearances and goals

Karel Geraerts (Dutch pronunciation: [ˈkaːrəl ˈɣeːraːrts]; born 5 January 1982) is a Belgian professional football manager and former player who was most recently the head coach of Ligue 2 club Reims.

== Playing career ==
=== Youth football ===
Karel Geraerts grew up in Opgrimbie and started playing football in 1989 at local club CS Mechelen. At the age of 14, Geraerts made the switch to the youth team of Racing Genk, where he was picked up by Club Brugge after two seasons in the Genk youth team. In 2000, Geraerts ended up in the Club first-team squad, alongside fellow youngsters Stijn Stijnen, Hans Cornelis and Birger Maertens.

=== Club Brugge and Lokeren loan ===
In the summer of 2000, the blue-blacks brought Timmy Simons to Brugge. The defensive midfielder immediately grew into a regular, meaning Geraerts would not immediately get his chance from trainer Trond Sollied. In the 2002/03 season, the young Limburger made a number of appearances as substitute, but did not enjoy a major breakthrough.

In January 2004, Geraerts was loaned to Sporting Lokeren for the second half of the 2003–04 season. Under trainer Franky Van der Elst, the blond midfielder became a regular at the Waaslanders. In a memorable away match against Westerlo, Geraerts scored his first goal at the highest level in a 7–3 win.

=== Standard Liège ===
In the summer of 2004, Standard Liège signed the then 22-year-old midfielder, putting him into a strong Rouches squad alongside Sérgio Conceição, Vedran Runje, Mohammed Tchité, Oguchi Onyewu and Ivica Dragutinović. Standard competed for the title for most of the 2005–06 season, but eventually saw rivals Anderlecht become champions. The following season saw extra competition for Geraerts' place with Steven Defour, Axel Witsel and Marouane Fellaini arriving. Despite this, he was still often preferred by trainer Michel Preud'homme, and rewarded his coach's faith by scoring eight goals in 28 league appearances that season.

=== Club Brugge again ===
Geraerts refused a contract extension at Standard in the summer of 2007, returning to Club Brugge, where he became a regular. As Standard claimed the next two league titles, Geraerts had little success on the sporting front in blue and black. Both trainer Jacky Mathijssen and his successor Adrie Koster were unable to win a prize at Bruges.

In the following 2010–11 season, Geraerts remained a key player in Bruges' midfield, but with Racing Genk emerging to hold off Standard Liege in the title race, and Anderlecht finishing third, the Club board informed Geraerts he could leave in the summer of 2011, and the midfielder was linked to several Turkish clubs.

Oud-Heverlee Leuven and Charleroi On 31 August 2011, the last day of the transfer window, Geraerts signed a contract with promoted club Oud-Heverlee Leuven, rapidly becoming a regular at the Leuven club.

After three seasons at Den Dreef, it was announced in June 2014 that Geraerts would be allowed to leave OHL as a free agent, having served his full three-year contract.

Having been unable to find a club during the summer, Charleroi gave the contractless Geraerts a one-year deal on the final day of the transfer window in August. The ex-Red Devil became an important pawn in the midfield at Charleroi under up-and-coming coach Felice Mazzu, helping the Carolos win a place in the title play-offs with the Mambourg club. leroi. At the end of the season, his contract was extended for 1 year, with an option for an additional year. Geraerts remained on for one more season before announcing his retirement in January 2017.

=== International career ===
In 2005, Geraerts debuted for the Belgium national football team. In his first match in the starting line-up, on 12 October in and against Lithuania in a World Cup qualifier, he scored the opening goal. In all, Geraerts playing 20 times for the Red Devils, scoring four goals.

== Coaching career ==
After a two-year spell as technical co-ordinator at Oostende, Geraerts became assistant coach at Union SG in 2019, culminating in promotion to the top flight of the Belgian Pro League after 48 years away in 2021. Confounding expectations, Union challenged for the title at the first attempt under Geraerts and head coach Felice Mazzu. After leading the league for exactly 200 days, Union lost back-to-back play-off games against Club Brugge to finish second behind the Bruges side in the 2021-22 title race.

With Mazzu tempted away by Anderlecht within a week of season's end, Geraerts stepped up to become a head coach for the first time, succeeding Mazzu. For the 2022-23 season, Union were in the top four throughout, without ever leading at the end of a matchweek. But as one of three clubs still in contention for the title heading into the final day, Union's 1–0 lead over Club Brugge would have been enough to clinch their first crown since 1938, until conceding three goals in stoppage time, as Royal Antwerp earned a point at K.R.C. Genk to finish ahead of both Genk and Union.

Talks on an improved contract between Geraerts and the fiscally-sensible Union broke down, and within weeks of almost guiding them to the league crown, Geraerts' contract was not renewed. He moved to Schalke 04 in October 2023, keeping them in the 2.Bundesliga by finishing tenth, twelve points above relegation. However, a poor start to the following season saw Schalke win only four points from their first five games, and when a 3–0 lead over Darmstadt turned into a 5–3 home loss, Geraerts and sporting director Marc Wilmots were dismissed on 21 September 2024.

On 18 June 2025, Geraerts signed a two-year contract with recently relegated Ligue 2 side Reims.. Despite reaching a 6th-placed finish in the 2025–26 Ligue 2, Geraerts left Reims by mutual consent at the start of next season after failing to reach the promotion playoffs.

== Career statistics ==
=== International ===
Appearances and goals by national team and year
National team	Year	Apps	Goals
Belgium	2005	3	1
Belgium	2006	8	1
Belgium	2007	6	2
Belgium	2008	1	0
Belgium	2009	2	0
Total		20	4

Belgium score listed first, score column indicates score after each Geraerts goal

List of international goals scored by Karel Geraerts
No.	Date	Venue	Opponent	Score	Result	Competition
1	12 October 2005	Žalgiris Stadium, Vilnius, Lithuania	Lithuania	0–1	1–1	2006 FIFA World Cup qualification
2	20 May 2006	Štadión Antona Malatinského, Trnava, Slovakia	Slovakia	1–1	1–1	Friendly
3	12 September 2007	Almaty Central Stadium, Almaty, Kazakhstan	Kazakhstan	0–1	2–2	UEFA Euro 2008 qualification
4	17 October 2007	Stade Roi Baudouin, Brussels, Belgium	Armenia	3–0	3–0	UEFA Euro 2008 qualification

=== Managerial ===
As of 9 May 2026

Managerial record by team and tenure
Team	From	To	Record					Ref.
Team	From	To	G	W	D	L	Win %	Ref.
Union SG	9 June 2022	21 June 2023	57	35	11	11	61.40	
Schalke 04	9 October 2023	21 September 2024	33	12	7	14	36.36	
Reims	18 June 2025	Present	40	18	15	7	45.00	
Total			130	65	33	32	50.00	

== Honours ==
=== Player ===
Club Brugge

- Belgian First Division: 2002–03
- Belgian Cup: 2001–02
- Belgian Supercup: 2002, 2003
- Bruges Matins: 2001

=== Manager ===
Individual

- Raymond Goethals Award: 2022
