= Gaëtan Englebert =

Belgian footballer

Personal information
- Date of birth: 11 June 1976 (age 50)
- Place of birth: Liège, Belgium
- Height: 1.79 m (5 ft 10 in)
- Position: Defensive midfielder

Team information
- Current team: RFC Liège (manager/sporting director)

Youth career
- 1986–1987: JS Villers l'Evêque
- 1987–1996: FC Liège

Senior career*
Years	Team	Apps	(Gls)
1996–1997	FC Liège	32	(6)
1997–1999	Sint-Truiden	66	(4)
1999–2008	Club Brugge	254	(22)
2008–2010	Tours	74	(2)
2010–2011	Metz	21	(0)
2011–2012	Coxyde	20	(0)
2012–2013	FC Liège		
Total		467	(34)

International career
1998	Belgium U18	2	(0)
1996–1997	Belgium U21	3	(0)
2001–2006	Belgium	9	(0)

Managerial career
- 2012–2013: RFC Liège (academy)
- 2013–: RFC Liège (sporting director)
- 2016–2022: Belgium U15 (assistant)
- 2022–: RFC Liège
- * Club domestic league appearances and goals

Gaëtan Englebert (born 11 June 1976) is a Belgian football coach, official and former player who played as a defensive midfielder. He is the manager and sporting director of RFC Liège.

== Club career ==
Born in Liège, Englebert started playing professionally with local club RFC Liège after spending nearly a decade in its youth system. In 1997, after one season, he moved to K. Sint-Truidense VV, where he made his Pro League debut.

Two years later Englebert signed for Club Brugge KV and was one of the club's most important midfielders during his eight-year spell, winning, amongst other accolades, two leagues and three cups. Overall, he appeared in 344 matches and scored 26 goals.

At 32, Englebert would have his first experience abroad, signing a two-year deal with Tours FC of Ligue 2 in June 2008. On 31 August 2010, choosing to stay in the division, he moved to FC Metz.

In July 2011, Englebert returned to his country and joined third level side K.V.V. Coxyde. In the following transfer window he returned to Liège, where he played until 2013; he continued working with the latter club as director of football after retiring.

== International career ==
Englebert collected nine caps for Belgium, the first arriving on 28 February 2001 as the Red Devils thrashed San Marino 10–1 in Brussels during qualification for the 2002 FIFA World Cup.

The national side made it to the final stages in South Korea and Japan and the player – following another solid season at Brugge – was picked for the 23-man squad, but did not leave the bench.

== Honours ==
Sint-Truiden

- Belgian League Cup: 1999

Club Brugge

- Belgian First Division: 2002–03, 2004–05
- Belgian Cup: 2001–02, 2003–04, 2006–07; runners-up: 2004–05
- Belgian Supercup: 2002, 2003, 2004, 2005
- Bruges Matins: 2000, 2001, 2004, 2006, 2007
- Jules Pappaert Cup: 2005

Belgium

- FIFA Fair Play Trophy: 2002 World Cup
