= Franky Vandendriessche =

Belgian footballer (born 1971)

Francky Vandendriessche
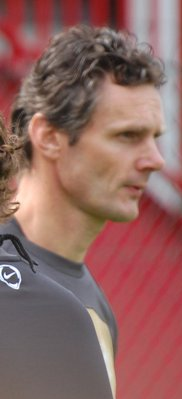
- Vandendriessche in 2011

Personal information
- Full name: Franck Vandendriessche
- Date of birth: 7 April 1971 (age 55)
- Place of birth: Waregem, Belgium
- Height: 1.87 m (6 ft 2 in)
- Position: Goalkeeper

Youth career
- 1979–1990: K.S.V. Waregem

Senior career*
Years	Team	Apps	(Gls)
1991–1998	K.S.V. Waregem	152	(0)
1998–2005	Mouscron	199	(0)
2005–2007	Cercle Brugge	58	(0)
Total		409	(0)

International career
2003	Belgium	1	(0)

Managerial career
- 2007–2009: Mouscron (goalkeeping coach)
- 2009: Belgium (goalkeeping coach)
- 2009–2011: Mons (goalkeeping coach)
- 2011–2013: K.V. Kortrijk (goalkeeping coach)
- 2013–: Gent (goalkeeping coach)
- * Club domestic league appearances and goals

Franck "Francky" Vandendriessche (Dutch pronunciation: [ˈfrɑŋki vɑndə(n)ˈdrisə]; born 7 April 1971) is a Belgian former professional footballer who played as a goalkeeper.

== Club career ==
Vandendriessche was born in Waregem. Among his former clubs are K.S.V. Waregem and Cercle Brugge.

== International career ==
Vandendriessche played one game with the Belgium national team against Croatia due to the injuries of both Geert De Vlieger and Frédéric Herpoel and Belgium lost 4–0. He was in the team for the 2002 World Cup.

== Coaching career ==
After his playing career, Vandendriessche became goalkeeping coach for his former team Mouscron. But due to financial uncertainty at Mouscron, he decided to move to Mons during the summer break of 2009. Assistant manager Geert Broeckaert would follow him a bit later.

On 10 July 2009, he became goalkeeping coach of the Belgium national team but was sacked on 6 October 2009 for having allegedly given a journalist from the Flemish newspaper Het Laatste Nieuws details about team selection before it had been officially announced. The Belgian goalkeeper Stijn Stijnen retired from the Belgian football team on the same day in connection with this incident. He was from 2007, the goalkeeping coach at Excelsior Mouscron until June 2009, and a short time later became the goalkeeper coach at Mons. In May 2011, he became goalkeeping coach at K.V. Kortrijk.

== Honours ==
=== Player ===
KSV Waregem

- Second Division: 1993–94

Belgium

- FIFA Fair Play Trophy: 2002 World Cup

Individual

- Belgian Professional Goalkeeper of the Year: 2001–02
