= Abdoulaye Seck =

Abdoulaye Seck may refer to:

- Abdoulaye Seck (footballer, born 1988), Senegalese footballer
- Abdoulaye Seck (footballer, born 1992), Senegalese footballer
