= Rubin Dantschotter =

Belgian footballer

Personal information
- Full name: Rubin Dantschotter
- Date of birth: 18 February 1986 (age 40)
- Place of birth: Bruges, Belgium
- Height: 1.85 m (6 ft 1 in)
- Position: Goalkeeper

Youth career
- SV Loppem
- Cercle Brugge

Senior career*
Years	Team	Apps	(Gls)
2005–	Cercle Brugge	20	(0)
2008–2009	→ SK Beveren (loan)	33	(0)
2011	→ KV Oostende (loan)		
2011–2012	→ Sparta Rotterdam (loan)		
- * Club domestic league appearances and goals as of 29 May 2011 ‡ National team caps and goals as of 10 July 2007

Rubin Dantschotter (Dutch pronunciation: [ˈrybɪn ˈdɑntsxɔtər]; born 18 February 1986 in Bruges) is a Belgian professional football player. His position on the field is goalkeeper.

== Club career ==
SV Loppem was Dantschotters first team, where he was discovered by Cercle Brugge at an early age. Dantschotter has played several matches for the Belgian national youth teams. He was the back-up goalie for former Belgian international Franky Vandendriessche. But when Vandendriessche retired in 2007, Dantschotter received the shirt with number 1.

Dantschotter debuted for Cercle in a cup match against AA Gent in December 2005, drawing 1-1 and losing after penalties.

After the departure of Francky Vandendriessche, Dantschotter was supposed to become first choice goalie. But due to personal problems, newly signed Bram Verbist got his chance at the beginning of the season. Dantschotter got to play the last 7 matches, after an injury of Verbist.

Dantschotter was loaned to second division side SK Beveren in 2008–09. He played on loan for KV Oostende from January to June 2011, and was loaned to Sparta Rotterdam in 2011–12.

He later played for amateur sides SV Koekelare and SW Harelbeke.
