= Olivier De Cock =

Belgian footballer

Personal information
- Date of birth: 9 November 1975 (age 50)
- Place of birth: Eeklo, Belgium
- Height: 1.82 m (6 ft 0 in)
- Position: Right-back

Team information
- Current team: Knokke (Reserves manager)

Senior career*
Years	Team	Apps	(Gls)
1995–2008	Club Brugge	286	(15)
2007–2008	→ Fortuna Düsseldorf (loan)	18	(0)
2008–2009	Rot-Weiß Oberhausen	4	(0)
2010	Oostende	9	(2)
2010–2011	Roeselare	17	(0)
2011–2012	SVV Damme	24	(3)

International career
2002–2005	Belgium	11	(0)

Managerial career
- 2018–2019: Oostende (U11)
- 2019–: Knokke (reserves)
- * Club domestic league appearances and goals

Olivier De Cock (born 9 November 1975) is a Belgian former professional footballer who played as a right-back. He is manager of the reserve team of R. Knokke FC.

== Club career ==
De Cock was born in Eeklo. He joined Club Brugge in 1987. In 1995, he was promoted to the first team. De Cock made his debut for the club on 29 November 1996 in a 3–1 league win over Gent. However, it was only after the departure of Eric Deflandre that De Cock got a permanent spot in the starting lineup. When Brian Priske arrived in 2006, he lost his permanent place in the side.

In August 2007 he moved to Fortuna Düsseldorf on loan. He then played for Rot-Weiß Oberhausen and Oostende. In the summer of 2010, he joined Roeselare on a one-year contract. After that season, De Cock retired as a professional football player. He then started playing on amateur level for SVV Damme.

== International career ==
De Cock earned 11 caps for the Belgium national team. His first game for them came against Andorra on 12 October 2002 in a 1–0 victory.

== Coaching career ==
In January 2018, De Cock was appointed team manager of his former club Roeselare. In the summer 2018, he was hired as the manager of K.V. Oostende's U11 team.

On 22 April 2019, he was appointed manager of the reserve team of R. Knokke FC.

== Career statistics ==
Appearances and goals by club, season and competition
Club	Season	League	
Club	Season	Apps	Goals
Club Brugge	1995–96	0	0
Club Brugge	1996–97	12	2
Club Brugge	1997–98	9	0
Club Brugge	1998–99	15	1
Club Brugge	1999–00	23	3
Club Brugge	2000–01	33	0
Club Brugge	2001–02	28	0
Club Brugge	2002–03	31	4
Club Brugge	2003–04	22	1
Club Brugge	2004–05	14	0
Club Brugge	2005–06	20	0
Club Brugge	2006–07	2	0
Fortuna Düsseldorf	2007–08	18	0

== Honours ==
Club Brugge

- Belgian First Division A: 2002–03, 2004–05
- Belgian Super Cup: 2002, 2003, 2005
