= Geert De Vlieger =

Belgian footballer

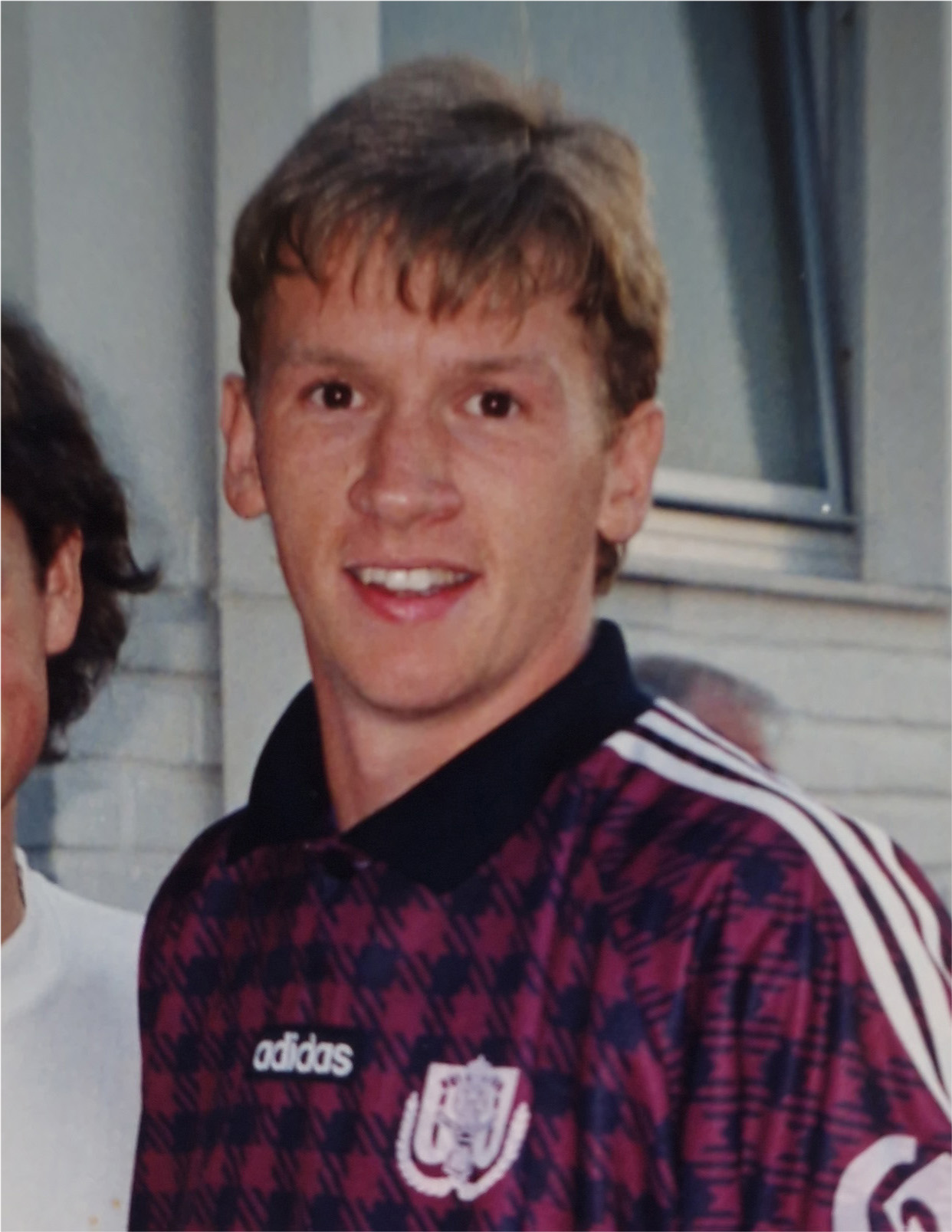
- De Vlieger with Anderlecht in 1997

Personal information
- Date of birth: 16 October 1971 (age 55)
- Place of birth: Aalst, Belgium
- Height: 1.86 m (6 ft 1 in)
- Position: Goalkeeper

Senior career*
Years	Team	Apps	(Gls)
1989–1995	Beveren	136	(0)
1995–1999	Anderlecht	61	(0)
1998–1999	→ Harelbeke (loan)	33	(0)
2000–2004	Willem II	136	(0)
2004–2006	Manchester City	0	(0)
2006–2008	Zulte Waregem	38	(0)
2008–2012	Club Brugge	14	(0)
Total		418	(0)

International career
1999–2006	Belgium	43	(0)
- * Club domestic league appearances and goals as of 17 September 2024

Geert De Vlieger (Dutch pronunciation: [ˈɣeːr də ˈvliɣər]; (Note: Geert in isolation: [ˈɣeːrt].) born 16 October 1971) is a Belgian former professional footballer who played as a goalkeeper.

== Career ==
De Vlieger was born in Dendermonde. He started his career in his home country playing for Anderlecht and Beveren before moving to the Netherlands and playing for Willem II for four years between 2000 and 2004. He played his first international for Belgium in 1999 and won 43 caps for his country. He was the second choice goalkeeper for the UEFA Euro 2000 behind starter Filip De Wilde, but then became the number 1 starter for the 2002 FIFA World Cup replacing the latter after De Wilde's poor performances during the Euro 2000.

De Vlieger signed with Manchester City in June 2004, but due to an achilles tendon injury he sustained, he missed the entirety of the 2004–05 season and did not play a single game during his two seasons in England. In June 2006, he signed for Zulte Waregem to make a comeback in the Belgian First Division A. On 30 May 2008, De Vlieger signed a one-year contract with Club Brugge as the backup behind Stijn Stijnen, as former backup Glenn Verbauwhede had been loaned out to Kortrijk. He announced his retirement from football in February 2011 at age 39.

== Honours ==
Beveren

- Second Division: 1990–91

Anderlecht

- Belgian Cup runner-up: 1996–97

Belgium

- FIFA Fair Play Trophy: 2002 World Cup

Individual

- Best Belgian Footballer Abroad: 2001
- Honorary Citizen of Lebbeke: 2017
