= 2002 Belgian Super Cup =

2002 Belgian Supercup
Genk	Club Brugge
0	2
- Date: 3 August 2002
- Venue: Fenix stadium, Genk
- Referee: Johan Verbist
- Attendance: 8,163

The 2002 Belgian Supercup was a football match between the winners of the previous season's 2001–02 Belgian First Division and 2001–02 Belgian Cup competitions. The match was contested by cup winners Club Brugge and league champions Genk on 3 August 2002 at the ground of the league champions, in this case the Fenix stadium.

Club Brugge won its 10th Belgian Super Cup, following late goals by Ebrima Ebou Sillah and Olivier De Cock.

== Details ==
3 August 2002

Genk	0–2	Club Brugge
	Report	Sillah 76'; De Cock 80'

Fenix stadium, Genk
Attendance: 8,163
Referee: Johan Verbist

Genk	Club Brugge

GK	1	(Belgium) Jan Moons
RB	18	(Belgium) Kevin Vanbeuren
CB	2	(Croatia) Igor Tomašić	(substituted off) 77'
CB	4	(Ivory Coast) Didier Zokora
LB	13	(Morocco) Akram Roumani
RM	12	(Belgium) Thomas Chatelle	(substituted off) 77'
CM	14	(Belgium) Bernd Thijs	(substituted off) 88'
CM	10	(Australia) Josip Skoko (c)
LM	20	(Belgium) Koen Daerden
RF	9	(Burkina Faso) Moumouni Dagano
LF	8	(Belgium) Wesley Sonck
Substitutes:
GK	27	(Belgium) Logan Bailly
DF	5	(Belgium) Wilfried Delbroek
DF	23	(Belgium) Vincent Euvrard	(substituted on) 88'
MF	22	(Cameroon) Justice Wamfor	(substituted on) 77'
MF	25	(Italy) Marco Ingrao
FW	11	(Belgium) Kevin Vandenbergh
FW	30	(Japan) Takayuki Suzuki	(substituted on) 77'
Manager:
(Netherlands) Sef Vergoossen

GK	23	(Belgium) Stijn Stijnen
RB	25	(Belgium) Hans Cornelis
CB	26	(Belgium) Birger Maertens
CB	6	(Belgium) Philippe Clement (c)	Booked
LB	10	(Federal Republic of Yugoslavia) Bratislav Ristić
CM	27	(Belgium) Karel Geraerts
CM	16	(Ukraine) Serhiy Serebrennikov		(substituted off) 46'
AM	24	(Belgium) Tim Smolders
RW	2	(Belgium) Olivier De Cock
CF	11	(Belgium) Sandy Martens	Booked	(substituted off) 82'
LW	20	(The Gambia) Ebrima Ebou Sillah		(substituted off) 82'
Substitutes:
GK	29	(Belgium) Peter Mollez
DF	28	(Belgium) Jimmy De Wulf
MF	14	(Slovenia) Nastja Čeh		(substituted on) 46'
MF	15	(Nigeria) Aminu Sani		(substituted on) 82'
MF	31	(Belgium) Kevin Roelandts
FW	17	(Brazil) José Duarte		(substituted on) 75'
FW	21	(Belgium) Sebastian Hermans
Manager:
(Norway) Trond Sollied

== See also ==
- 2002–03 Belgian First Division
- 2002–03 Belgian Cup
