= Guy Dufour =

Belgian footballer

Personal information
- Date of birth: 14 March 1987 (age 39)
- Place of birth: Mol, Belgium
- Height: 1.77 m (5 ft 9 1/2 in)
- Position: Midfielder

Team information
- Current team: Dessel Sport
- Number: 28

Youth career
- 2000–2006: PSV Eindhoven

Senior career*
Years	Team	Apps	(Gls)
2006–2008	FC Volendam	5	(0)
2008	FC Eindhoven	11	(1)
2008–2011	Lommel United	95	(19)
2011–2012	Standard Liège	0	(0)
2011–2012	→ Royal Antwerp (loan)	31	(2)
2012–2014	Sint-Truiden	57	(4)
2014–2017	Eupen	77	(6)
2017–2019	Roeselare	44	(1)
2019–	Dessel Sport		
- * Club domestic league appearances and goals as of 16:14, 7 November 2019 (UTC)

Guy Dufour (born 14 March 1987) is a Belgian footballer who currently plays for Roeselare in the Belgian First Division B as a central midfielder.

== Club career ==
=== PSV ===
Guy Dufour played for PSV jeugd (youngster) as a schoolboy since 2001. He had gained a constant promotion each year. In 2005, he was promoted to PSV Jong (the highest grade among jeugd) and was constantly assigned as the captain. In the same year, he was given the shirt no.32 in the first team and was highly profiled among his reserves teammates. However, he was unable to gain a place in the first team and was finally sold to FC Volendam in the end of 05/06 season.

Over the six years at PSV Eindhoven, he has followed the team to a number of countries for competitions, for example, the Hong Kong International Soccer 7 2006 held in May.

Timeline:
'00-'01 Team C2
'01-'02 Team C1
'02-'03 Team B1
'03-'04 Team A1
'04-'05 Team A1
'05-'06 Jong PSV

=== FC Eindhoven ===
Dufour signed with FC Eindhoven in January 2008 on a contract lasting until the mid of 2008.

=== Lommel United ===
Following his contract with the Eerste Divisie club expired, Dufour returned to Belgium and later joined Second Division side Lommel United in July 2008. He wore jersey number 8 and spent three season with the club as a regular player.

=== Standard de Liège ===
On 27 April 2011, Royal Standard de Liège announced that he had signed a two-year contract and an option for a further two-year and would join in the summer transfer window.

== Sources ==
PSVjeugd
PSVjeugd in Hong Kong
PSV official Site
FC Volendam Official Site

Specific
