= Roy Mauro =

Belgian footballer (born 1990)

Personal information
- Date of birth: 16 November 1990 (age 35)
- Place of birth: Antwerp, Belgium
- Height: 1.91 m (6 ft 3 in)
- Position: Centre-back

Team information
- Current team: KVC Wilrijk
- Number: 6

Youth career
- 1996–2007: Lyra-Lierse
- 2007–2008: Germinal Beerschot

Senior career*
Years	Team	Apps	(Gls)
2008–2012	Germinal Beerschot	2	(0)
2010–2011	→ Turnhout (loan)	49	(4)
2012–2014	Sint-Niklaas	74	(5)
2014–2016	Hoogstraten	49	(5)
2016–2021	Berchem Sport	57	(6)
2021–2022	Londerzeel	29	(0)
2023	Racing Mechelen	14	(1)
2023–	KVC Wilrijk		
- * Club domestic league appearances and goals as of 08:25, 16 January 2026 (UTC)

Roy Mauro (born 16 November 1990) is a Belgian professional footballer who plays as a centre-back for KVC Wilrijk.

== Career ==
=== Beerschot ===
Mauro played in the youth department of Lyra until in 2007, where he was included in the Germinal Beerschot academy. In 2008, he signed his first professional deal; a four-year contract. On 8 May 2009, Mauro made his debut in the first team on the penultimate matchday of the 2008–09 season, coming off the bench in the 73rd minute for Paul Kpaka in a 3–1 home victory against Mechelen.

The following two seasons, Mauro played on loan for Turnhout. In the 2011–12 season he returned to Beerschot, but was loaned out to KV Turnhout for another six months. At the end of the following season he left for Sint-Niklaas.

=== Later career ===
In July 2014, Mauro signed with Hoogstraten. From the 2016–17 season he began playing for Berchem. In January 2021 he moved to Londerzeel. He left the club in late 2022 for personal reasons, and instead joined KRC Mechelen from January 2023.
