= Luciano Dompig =

Dutch professional football player

Personal information
- Full name: Luciano Dompig
- Date of birth: 2 March 1987 (age 39)
- Place of birth: Amsterdam, Netherlands
- Height: 1.84 m (6 ft 1/2 in)
- Position: Midfielder

Youth career
- ASV Fortius
- Ajax

Senior career*
Years	Team	Apps	(Gls)
2006–2008	Volendam	9	(1)
2008–2010	Veendam	32	(1)
2010–2011	Almere City	14	(1)
2011–2012	Cercle Brugge	5	(0)
2012	Akritas Chloraka		(0)
2013	Aris Limassol	2	(0)
2015–2016	TOT	6	(1)
2016–2017	Lisse		
- * Club domestic league appearances and goals as of 31 October 2015 ‡ National team caps and goals as of 25 July 2011

Luciano Dompig (born 2 March 1987 in Amsterdam) is a Dutch retired footballer.

== Club career ==
Dompig made his senior debut on 24 March 2006 for FC Volendam in a match against Helmond Sport. After a stint with Veendam and Almere City FC, in 2011 he transferred from the Dutch Jupiler League to the Belgian Pro League as he signed with Cercle Brugge. He later played in Cyprus and Thailand and returned to Holland to join FC Lisse in 2016 after his Thai club TOT folded. He continued his career at fellow amateur sides Zaanlandia, FC Zaandam and RKAVIC.
