= Laurens Paulussen =

Belgian footballer

Personal information
- Date of birth: 19 July 1990 (age 36)
- Place of birth: Turnhout, Belgium
- Height: 1.75 m (5 ft 9 in)
- Position: Left-back

Team information
- Current team: Lommel

Youth career
- 1997–2004: Hoogstraten
- 2004–2006: Lierse
- 2006–2008: Anderlecht
- 2008–2009: Germinal Beerschot
- 2009–2010: Waasland

Senior career*
Years	Team	Apps	(Gls)
2010–2012	Waasland-Beveren	85	(7)
2012–2014	Westerlo	50	(7)
2014–2018	Mechelen	85	(1)
2018–2020	Lommel	7	(0)
- * Club domestic league appearances and goals as of 3 January 2016

Laurens Paulussen (born 19 July 1990) is a former professional Belgian footballer who last played for Lommel in the Belgian First Division B.
