= Arnaud De Greef =

Belgian footballer

Personal information
- Full name: Arnaud Y. De Greef
- Date of birth: 12 April 1992 (age 34)
- Place of birth: Jette, Belgium
- Height: 1.84 m (6 ft 0 in)
- Position: Centre back

Team information
- Current team: KFC Voorde-Appelterre

Senior career*
Years	Team	Apps	(Gls)
2010–2011	Anderlecht	0	(0)
2011–2013	Westerlo	41	(0)
2013–2015	Eendracht Aalst	63	(1)
2015–2016	FC Dordrecht	30	(0)
2016–2021	Deinze	118	(2)
2022–	KFC Voorde-Appelterre		

International career
2007	Belgium U15	2	(0)
2007–2008	Belgium U16	2	(0)
2009–2010	Belgium U18	6	(1)
2011	Belgium U21	1	(0)
- * Club domestic league appearances and goals as of 20:58, 4 May 2021 (UTC)

Arnaud Y. De Greef (born 12 April 1992) is a Belgian footballer who plays for KFC Voorde-Appelterre in the fifth-tier Belgian Division 3. He formerly played for Anderlecht, Westerlo and Eendracht Aalst.
