= William Owusu (footballer, born 1989) =

Ghanaian footballer

Personal information
- Full name: William Owusu Acheampong
- Date of birth: 13 September 1989 (age 37)
- Place of birth: Accra, Ghana
- Height: 1.87 m (6 ft 1 1/2 in)
- Position: Striker

Team information
- Current team: Sint-Eloois-Winkel

Youth career
- 2004–2006: Real Tamale
- 2006–2007: Anderlecht
- 2007–2008: Sporting CP

Senior career*
Years	Team	Apps	(Gls)
2008–2014	Sporting CP	0	(0)
2009	→ Real Massamá (loan)	16	(6)
2010	→ Gil Vicente (loan)	13	(2)
2010–2011	→ Cercle Brugge (loan)	31	(4)
2011–2013	→ Westerlo (loan)	38	(11)
2013–2014	→ Corona Braşov (loan)	0	(0)
2014–2019	Antwerp	99	(34)
2016	→ Roeselare (loan)	8	(3)
2019–2021	Ajman	28	(8)
2021	→ Al Bataeh (loan)		
2022	Al-Fujairah		
2023–	Sint-Eloois-Winkel		
- * Club domestic league appearances and goals as of 10 January 2021

William Owusu Acheampong (born 13 September 1989) is a Ghanaian footballer who plays for Sint-Eloois-Winkel as a striker.
