= Marcão (footballer, born 1986) =

Brazilian footballer (born 1986)

Personal information
- Full name: Alfredo Marcos da Silva Junior
- Date of birth: 2 April 1986 (age 40)
- Place of birth: Rio de Janeiro, Brazil
- Position: Striker

Senior career*
Years	Team	Apps	(Gls)
2009	Vila Aurora		
2009–2010	Boa		
2010	Al Dhafra		
2010–2011	Vila Aurora	7	(2)
2011	Trindade		
2011	São Carlos		
2011–2012	Westerlo	5	(1)
- * Club domestic league appearances and goals as of 21 January 2012

Alfredo Marcos da Silva Junior, known as Marcão (born 2 April 1986), is a Brazilian professional footballer who most recently played for Belgian club Westerlo, as a striker.

== Career ==
Omolo has played club football in Brazil, United Arab Emirates and Belgium for Vila Aurora, Boa, Al Dhafra, Trindade, São Carlos and Westerlo.
