= Davy Cooreman =

Belgian footballer (born 1971)

Personal information
- Date of birth: 21 October 1971 (age 55)
- Place of birth: Belgium
- Position: Midfielder

Senior career*
Years	Team	Apps	(Gls)
1990–1992	Gent		
1992–1994	Club Brugge		
1994–1995	Zulte Waregem		
1995–1998	Club Brugge		
1998–2000	Eendracht Aalst		
2000–2002	Hapoel Be'er Sheva		
2002–2004	RAAL		
2004–2005	Beringen-Heusden-Zolder		
2005–2006	Zomergem		
- * Club domestic league appearances and goals

Davy Cooreman (born 21 October 1971) is a Belgian football manager and former footballer.

== Club career ==
Cooreman started his career with Belgian side Gent. He played in the European Cup while playing for Gent and Club Brugge. He has been described as a "gifted ball virtuoso" and helped RAAL win the 2003 Belgian Cup.

== International career ==
Cooreman represented Belgium internationally at youth level.

== Style of play ==
Cooreman mainly operated as a defensive midfielder.

== Post-playing career ==
After retiring from professional football, Cooreman worked in a cafe.

== Managerial career ==
After retiring from professional football, Cooreman worked as a manager.
