= Kevin Packet =

Belgian footballer

Personal information
- Date of birth: 14 March 1992 (age 34)
- Place of birth: Oudenburg, Belgium
- Height: 1.77 m (5 ft 9 1/2 in)
- Position: Midfielder

Youth career
- Oostende
- ?–2010: Cercle Brugge

Senior career*
Years	Team	Apps	(Gls)
2010–2013	Cercle Brugge	1	(0)
2012–2013	→ Standaard Wetteren (loan)	11	(0)

International career
2008–2009	Belgium U17	8	(0)
2010	Belgium U18	3	(0)
2010	Belgium U19	1	(0)
- * Club domestic league appearances and goals as of 14:50, 24 May 2014 (UTC)

Kevin Packet (born 14 March 1992) is a Belgian footballer who played for Cercle Brugge in the Belgian Pro League.
