= Sven Van Der Jeugt =

Belgian footballer

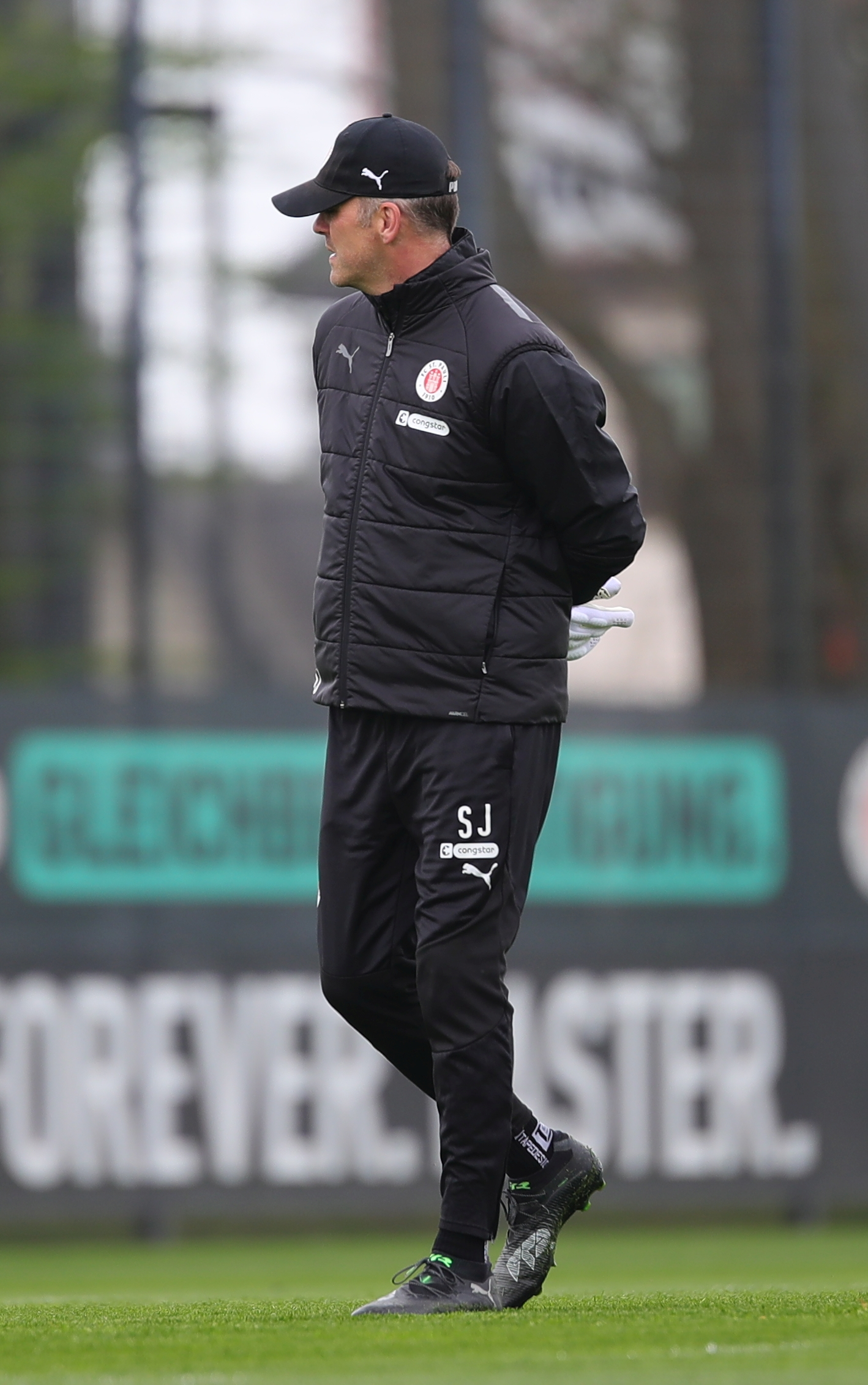
- Van Der Jeugt in 2025

Personal information
- Date of birth: 17 September 1980 (age 46)
- Place of birth: Diest, Belgium
- Height: 1.91 m (6 ft 3 in)
- Position: Goalkeeper

Team information
- Current team: FC St. Pauli (goalkeeper coach)

Senior career*
Years	Team	Apps	(Gls)
2000–2001	Anderlecht		
2001–2004	Lokeren	20	(0)
2004–2005	Zulte-Waregem	5	(0)
2005–2010	Lierse	44	(0)
2009–2010	→ RFC Liege (loan)	8	(0)
2010–2011	Sint-Truiden	20	(0)
2011–2012	Fortuna Sittard	2	(0)
2012	Tienen	13	(0)
2012–2013	Antwerp	0	(0)
2013–2015	Bocholt VV	49	(0)
2015–2016	Houtvenne		
- * Club domestic league appearances and goals

Sven Van Der Jeugt (born 17 September 1980) is a retired Belgian football goalkeeper. He is currently the goalkeeper coach of FC St. Pauli.

== Coaching career ==
After retiring at the end of the 2015/16 season, Van Der Jeugt became goalkeeper coach of Patro Eisden. He left the club six months later.

In July 2017, he then became goalkeeper coach of Thes Sport, which he was for one year. He then moved to his former club Anderlecht and became goalkeeper coach for the reserve team / U21 squad.

On 25 June 2019, he was appointed goalkeeper coach of Waasland-Beveren.
