= 2003 Belgian Super Cup =

2003 Belgian Supercup
Club Brugge	La Louvière
1	1
- Club Brugge won 5–4 on penalties
- Date: 2 August 2003
- Venue: Jan Breydel Stadium, Bruges
- Referee: Serge Gumienny
- Attendance: 3,268

The 2003 Belgian Supercup was a football match between the winners of the previous season's 2002–03 Belgian First Division and 2002–03 Belgian Cup competitions. The match was contested by cup winners La Louvière and league champions Club Brugge on 2 August 2003 at the ground of the league champions as usual, in this case the Jan Breydel Stadium.

La Louvière took an early lead through Vervalle, with Nastja Čeh providing the equalizer just before the hour mark. Club Brugge eventually won its second consecutive Supercup title and 11th in total, as it beat La Louvière on penalty kicks.

== Details ==
2 August 2003
20:30 CEST

Club Brugge	1–1	La Louvière
Čeh 58'	Report	Vervalle 7'
Penalties
Simons (penalty scored); Čeh (penalty scored); Sæternes (penalty scored); Mendoza (penalty scored); Cornelis (penalty scored)	5–4	(penalty missed) Siquet; (penalty scored) Cooreman; (penalty scored) Tilmant; (penalty scored) Ishiaku; (penalty scored) Mamouni

Jan Breydel Stadium, Bruges
Attendance: 3,268
Referee: Serge Gumienny

Club Brugge	La Louvière

GK	23	(Belgium) Stijn Stijnen
RB	2	(Belgium) Olivier De Cock	(substituted off) 70'
CB	26	(Belgium) Birger Maertens	(substituted off) 46'
CB	6	(Belgium) Philippe Clement
LB	5	(Belgium) Peter Van der Heyden
DM	3	(Belgium) Timmy Simons (c)
CM	16	(Ukraine) Serhiy Serebrennikov
CM	10	(Slovenia) Nastja Čeh
RW	7	(Belgium) Gert Verheyen
CF	19	(Norway) Rune Lange	(substituted off) 65'
LW	18	(Peru) Andrés Mendoza
Substitutes:
RB	25	(Belgium) Hans Cornelis	(substituted on) 70'
CB	4	(Czech Republic) David Rozehnal	(substituted on) 45'
CF	9	(Norway) Bengt Sæternes	(substituted on) 65'
Manager:
(Norway) Trond Sollied

GK	24	(Belgium) Silvio Proto
RB	14	(Ghana) George Blay
CB	6	(Belgium) Georges Arts
CB	4	(Belgium) Thierry Siquet (c)
LB	7	(Belgium) Yannick Vervalle
DM	15	(Belgium) Daniel Camus	Booked	(substituted off) 85'
RM	16	(Belgium) Davy Cooreman
AM	12	(Belgium) Serge Djamba-Shango	Booked	(substituted off) 80'
LM	18	(Algeria) Maamar Mamouni	Booked
CF	25	(Nigeria) Peter Odemwingie
CF	20	(Nigeria) Manasseh Ishiaku
Substitutes:
RM	15	(Brazil) Benjamin Rogerio De Oliveira		(substituted on) 85'
RB	11	(Belgium) Frédéric Tilmant		(substituted on) 80'
Manager:
(Belgium) Ariël Jacobs

== See also ==
- 2003–04 Belgian First Division
- 2003–04 Belgian Cup
