= Mark De Man =

Belgian footballer

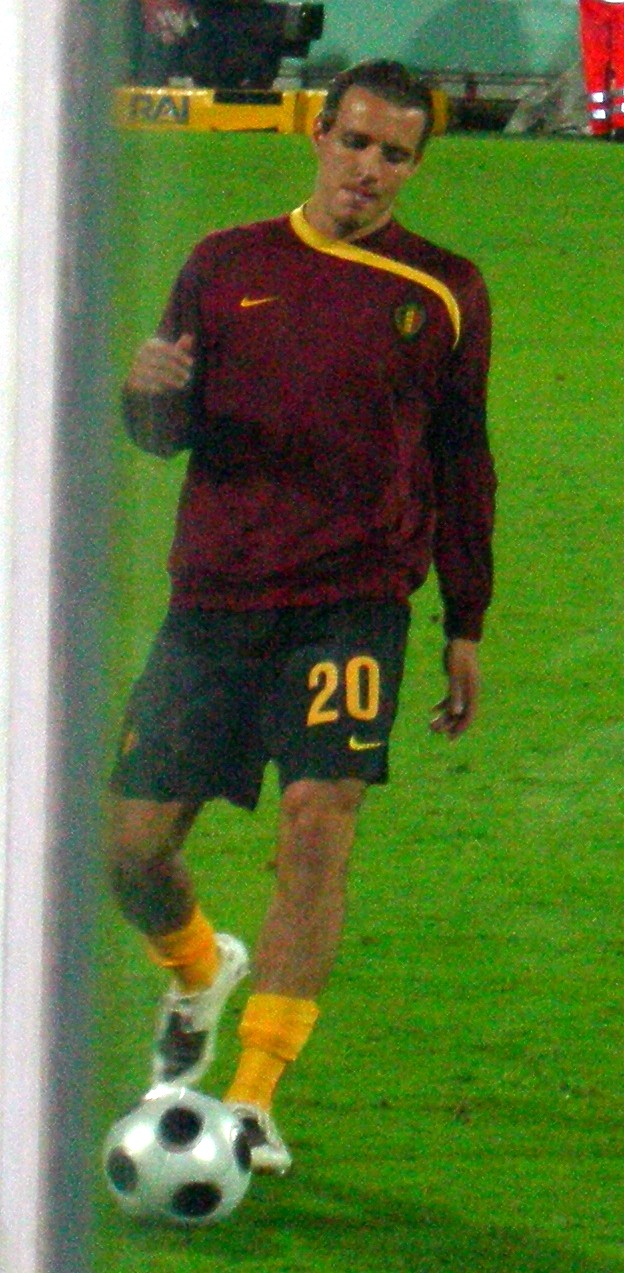
- De Man in 2008

Personal information
- Date of birth: 27 April 1983 (age 43)
- Place of birth: Leuven, Belgium
- Height: 1.80 m (5 ft 11 in)
- Position: Defender

Youth career
- 1991–1993: Haasrode
- 1993–1996: OH Leuven
- 1996–1997: RJ Wavre
- 1997–1998: OH Leuven
- 1998–2002: Anderlecht

Senior career*
Years	Team	Apps	(Gls)
2002–2008	Anderlecht	84	(0)
2008–2009	Roda JC Kerkrade	7	(0)
2009–2011	Germinal Beerschot	11	(0)
2011	→ OH Leuven (loan)	8	(0)
2011–2012	K.S.C. Hasselt	7	(0)
Total		117	(0)

International career
2001	Belgium U18	6	(0)
2001–2002	Belgium U19	14	(0)
2004–2005	Belgium U21	14	(0)
2007–2008	Belgium	5	(0)
- * Club domestic league appearances and goals

Mark De Man (born 27 April 1983) is a Belgian former professional footballer who played as a centre-back or right-back, most notably for Anderlecht. He moved to Dutch side Roda JC in the Eredivisie for an undisclosed fee in the 2008–09 season and then returned to Belgium to play for Germinal Beerschot. De Man made five appearances for the Belgium national team.

== Club career ==
Born in Leuven, De Man played for OH Leuven during his youth before signing with Anderlecht in 1998. In 2002, he was promoted to Anderlecht's first team where he established himself as a starter in 2005.

In July 2008, with a year left on his contract with Anderlecht, De Man agreed a three-year contract with Eredivisie club Roda JC Kerkrade.

After featuring sparingly for Roda, he left the club for Germinal Beerschot. During his time at Germinal Beerschot, De Man was kept out of action by a knee injury and an ankle sprain. In his three seasons at the club he made few appearances and joined his youth club OH Leuven of the Belgian Second Division in January 2011.

In autumn 2011 De Man was close to a move to Scottish club Kilmarnock but after a trial with Kilmarnock, he moved to the Belgian third division club KSC Hasselt.

== International career ==
De Man received his first call-up to the Belgium national team in November 2006, for a UEFA Euro 2008 qualifier against Poland.
