= Abdoulaye Seck (footballer, born 1988) =

Senegalese footballer

Ablaye Seck
Personal information
- Full name: Abdoulaye Seck
- Date of birth: March 10, 1988 (age 38)
- Place of birth: Dakar, Senegal
- Height: 1.89 m (6 ft 2 1/2 in)
- Position: Full back

Youth career
- Niary Tally

Senior career*
Years	Team	Apps	(Gls)
2005–2011	Niary Tally	95	(8)
2011–2014	Anderlecht	2	(0)
2011–2012	→ Brussels (loan)	11	(1)
2014–2017	Niary Tally		
2017–2019	Namur		

International career
2008	Senegal U20	7	(0)
- * Club domestic league appearances and goals as of 13 October 2012

Abdoulaye Seck (born 10 March 1988 in Dakar) is a Senegalese footballer who plays as a full back.

== Career ==
Seck began his professional career in Niary Tally. In January 2011, he was moved to Belgian Pro League giants R.S.C. Anderlecht. He then made his debut on new club on 3 April 2011, acting as a starter in a 1-3 home defeat against Standard Liège, in the Jupiler League Playoffs.

In July 2011, Seck was loaned to FC Brussels, on a season-long loan.
