= Birger Maertens =

Belgian footballer

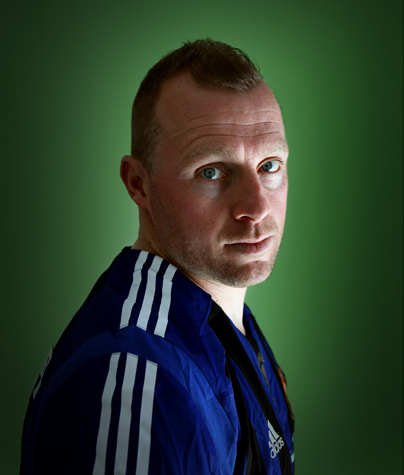

Personal information
- Full name: Birger Maertens
- Date of birth: 28 June 1980 (age 46)
- Place of birth: Bruges, Belgium
- Height: 1.82 m (6 ft 0 in)
- Position: Defender

Youth career
- Varsenare
- 1994–2001: Club Brugge

Senior career*
Years	Team	Apps	(Gls)
2001–2008	Club Brugge	161	(1)
2008–2012	Heracles Almelo	93	(2)
2012–2015	Westerlo	87	(0)
Total		341	(3)

International career
1998	Belgium U18	8	(0)
1999	Belgium U19	2	(0)
2002	Belgium U21	5	(0)
2005	Belgium	1	(0)
- * Club domestic league appearances and goals

Birger Maertens (born 28 June 1980) is a Belgian former professional footballer who played as a centre back. He obtained two caps for the Belgium national team.

== Club career ==
=== Club Brugge ===
Born in Bruges, Maertens joined Club Brugge KV in 1994. He played his first game on 9 August 2001 against Icelandic side IA Akranes (4–0) in the UEFA Cup.

=== Heracles Almelo ===
On 25 June 2008, Maertens joined the Dutch side Heracles Almelo. He signed a contract until 2011. In 2009 Birger Maertens was voted 8th best overall player in the Eredivisie by Dutch football magazine Voetbal International.

On 6 January 2012, it was announced he had left Heracles earlier than planned, for personal reasons, to return to his native Belgium, and would not see out the rest of his contract.

== International career ==
On 12 October 2005, Maertens collected his first cap for the Belgium national team in the qualification stages for the 2006 FIFA World Cup against Lithuania (1–1).

== Honours ==
Club Brugge

- Belgian First Division: 2002–03, 2004–05
- Belgian Cup: 2001–02, 2003–04, 2006–07
- Belgian Super Cup: 2002, 2003, 2004, 2005
