= Gertjan De Mets =

Belgian footballer

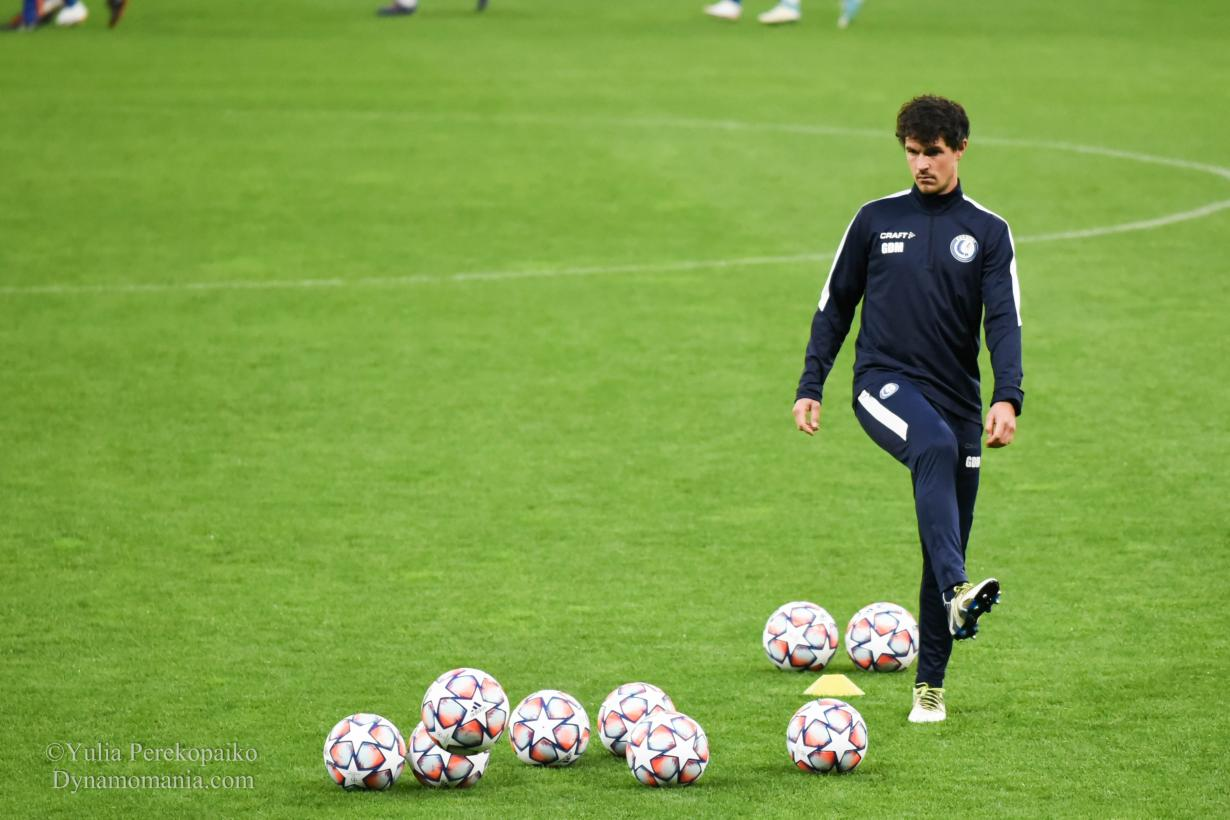

Personal information
- Date of birth: 2 April 1987 (age 39)
- Place of birth: Bruges, Belgium
- Height: 1.76 m (5 ft 9 in)
- Position: Defensive midfielder

Team information
- Current team: Gent (youth coach)

Youth career
- Club Brugge

Senior career*
| Years | Team | Apps | (Gls) |
| 2006–2011 | Club Brugge | 26 | (0) |
| 2010–2011 | → Kortrijk (loan) | 23 | (1) |
| 2011–2017 | Kortrijk | 202 | (7) |
| 2017–2019 | Zulte Waregem | 12 | (0) |
| 2018–2019 | → Beerschot Wilrijk (loan) | 25 | (0) |
| Total | | 288 | (8) |
- * Club domestic league appearances and goals

Gertjan de Mets (born 2 April 1987) is a retired Belgian football player who played as a midfielder. He is currently an assistant coach for K.A.A. Gent.

== Coaching career ==
de Mets retired at the end of the 2018–19 season and was hired by Gent as manager of the U12 team and as a video analyst for the first team.
