= Justice Wamfor =

Cameroonian footballer

Personal information
- Full name: Justice Wamfor
- Date of birth: 5 August 1981 (age 45)
- Place of birth: Bafoussam, Cameroon
- Height: 1.75 m (5 ft 9 in)
- Position: Defensive midfielder

Senior career*
Years	Team	Apps	(Gls)
2000–2001	Racing Bafoussam	?	(?)
2001–2006	Genk	100	(2)
2006–2011	Germinal Beerschot	85	(2)
2011–2012	Maccabi Petah Tikva	16	(0)
2013	Royal Antwerp	3	(0)

International career^{‡}
2004–2008	Cameroon	5	(0)
- * Club domestic league appearances and goals as of 25 May 2010 (UTC) ‡ National team caps and goals as of 25 May 2010 (UTC)

Justice Wamfor (born 5 August 1981) is a retired Cameroonian footballer who played as a midfielder. He previously played for Racing Club Bafoussam, RC Genk, Germinal Beerschot and more recently for Israeli Premier League side Maccabi Petah Tikva and Royal Antwerp.
