= Glenn Verbauwhede =

Belgian footballer

Personal information
- Date of birth: 19 May 1985 (age 41)
- Place of birth: Kortrijk, Belgium
- Height: 1.87 m (6 ft 2 in)
- Position: Goalkeeper

Youth career
- ?–1997: KSV Waregem
- 1997–2004: Club Brugge

Senior career*
Years	Team	Apps	(Gls)
2004–2011	Club Brugge	10	(0)
2008–2011	→ Kortrijk (loan)	65	(0)
2012	Westerlo	11	(0)
2013–2015	Mamelodi Sundowns	0	(0)
2014–2015	→ Free State Stars (loan)	6	(0)
2016	Maritzburg United	10	(0)
Total		102	(0)

International career
2000–2001	Belgium U16	11	(0)
2001–2002	Belgium U17	7	(0)
2002–2003	Belgium U18	8	(0)
2002–2004	Belgium U19	26	(0)
2004–2006	Belgium U21	10	(0)
- * Club domestic league appearances and goals

Glenn Verbauwhede (born 19 May 1985) is a Belgian former professional football goalkeeper and a football agent.

== Career ==
Verbauwhede joined Club Brugge from KSV Waregem in 1997. He was promoted to the first-team squad in 2004. In summer 2008, he was loaned out to Kortrijk.

In January 2012, he joined Westerlo. After almost a year of without a club, free agent Verbauwhede joined Mamelodi Sundowns in spring 2013.

Following a stint with Maritzburg United, Verbauwhede retired from playing professional football and began a career as a football player agent. He currently represents South African footballer Ayanda Patosi.
