= Stijn Stijnen =

Belgian footballer and chairman

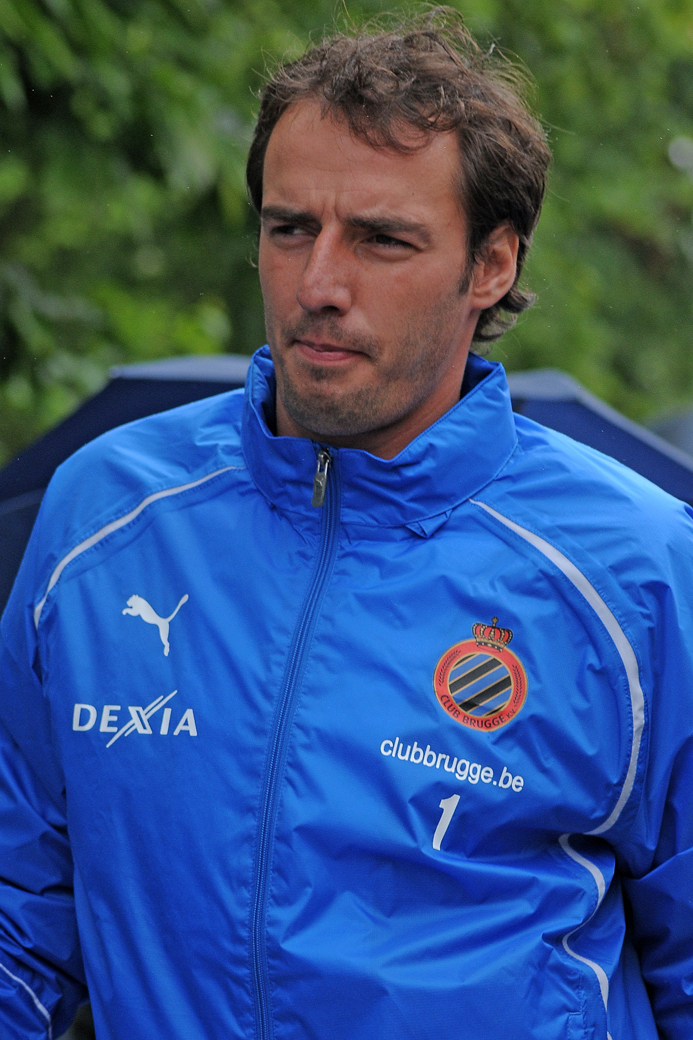
- Stijnen training with Brugge in 2011

Personal information
- Date of birth: 7 April 1981 (age 45)
- Place of birth: Hasselt, Belgium
- Height: 1.88 m (6 ft 2 in)
- Position: Goalkeeper

Team information
- Current team: Patro Eisden (sporting director)

Youth career
- 1989–1993: Runkst VV
- 1993–2000: Hasselt

Senior career*
Years	Team	Apps	(Gls)
2000–2011	Club Brugge	155	(0)
2011–2013	Beerschot	33	(0)
Total		188	(0)

International career
2006–2009	Belgium	30	(0)

Managerial career
- 2016–2017: Hasselt
- 2018–2026: Patro Eisden
- 2026–: Patro Eisden (sporting director)
- * Club domestic league appearances and goals

Stijn Stijnen (Dutch pronunciation: [ˈstɛin ˈstɛinə(n)]; born 7 April 1981) is a Belgian professional football coach and a former player who is the sporting director of Challenger Pro League club Patro Eisden. A goalkeeper, he played in 189 Belgian Pro League games during thirteen seasons, mainly with Club Brugge with which he won nine major titles, including two national championships.

== Club career ==
Born in Hasselt, Limburg, Stijnen moved from K.S.C. Hasselt to Club Brugge KV in 2000, aged 19, and became the club's first stand-in for veteran Dany Verlinden – when the latter retired at 41, he backed up Tomislav Butina. On 18 April 2003, he made his debut in the league, in a 3–0 away win against K.R.C. Genk. However, his big breakthrough came in the 2005–06 season, when he replaced the injured Butina several times; some strong performances (including the UEFA Champions League 2–1 home loss to Juventus in the group stage) made him the undisputed first-choice onwards.

In the 2006–07 campaign, Stijnen was between the posts as Brugge won the Belgian Cup 1–0 against Standard Liège, but the club only finished sixth in the domestic league. He never played in less than 31 league games in the following three seasons, but the Blue and Black did not manage to win any silverware.

Stijnen retired in the 2013 summer at the age of 32, after two top flight seasons with Beerschot AC. He returned to youth club Hasselt subsequently, after being appointed director of football.

== International career ==
Belgium manager René Vandereycken noticed Stijnen's performances at club level, and handed him his debut in a friendly against Saudi Arabia on 11 May 2006. In March 2007, before an UEFA Euro 2008 qualifier against Portugal, he reportedly claimed his teammates should take opponent star Cristiano Ronaldo out of the game in an early stage, by all means necessary; eventually the home side won 4–0, with Cristiano Ronaldo scoring twice, and the Manchester United player accepted the Belgian's apologies.

Stijnen retired from international play in October 2009, after collecting 30 caps.

== Career statistics ==
Appearances and goals by club, season and competition
Club	Season	League		
Club	Season	Division	Apps	Goals
Club Brugge	2002–03	Belgian Pro League	2	0
Club Brugge	2003–04	Belgian Pro League	0	0
Club Brugge	2004–05	Belgian Pro League	1	0
Club Brugge	2005–06	Belgian Pro League	15	0
Club Brugge	2006–07	Belgian Pro League	27	0
Club Brugge	2007–08	Belgian Pro League	31	0
Club Brugge	2008–09	Belgian Pro League	31	0
Club Brugge	2009–10	Belgian Pro League	36	0
Club Brugge	2010–11	Belgian Pro League	12	0
Club Brugge	Total		155	0
Beerschot AC	2011–12	Belgian Pro League	13	0
Beerschot AC	2012–13	Belgian Pro League	20	0
Beerschot AC	Total		33	0
Career total			188	0

== Honours ==
Club Brugge

- Belgian First Division: 2002–03, 2004–05
- Belgian Cup: 2001–02, 2006–07
- Belgian Super Cup: 2002, 2003, 2004, 2005
- Bruges Matins: 2000, 2001, 2004, 2006, 2007, 2008, 2009
- Jules Pappaert Cup: 2005
