= 2013–14 Oud-Heverlee Leuven season =

Oud-Heverlee Leuven
2013–14 season
- Chairman: (Belgium) Jan Callewaert
- Manager: (Belgium) Ronny Van Geneugden (until 21 January); Herman Vermeulen (from 27 January until 25 February); Ivan Leko (from 25 February)
- Stadium: Den Dreef
- Belgian Pro League: 15th (relegated)
- Belgian Cup: Round 7
- Top goalscorer: League: Bjorn Ruytinx, 10 goals All: Bjorn Ruytinx, 11 goals
- Highest home attendance: 9,493 vs. Club Brugge and vs. Anderlecht
- Lowest home attendance: 7,613 vs. Charleroi
Home colours	Away colours

The 2013–14 season was Oud-Heverlee Leuven's 12th competitive season in professional football and the team's third season in the Belgian Pro League. After struggling the whole season, OH Leuven ended 15th in the league and was forced to play the relegation playoffs against Mons. They did get past Mons but were eventually relegated as they did not manage to win the Belgian Second Division final round. OH Leuven also had a mediocre cup run, struggling past Belgian Second Division team Visé before falling 3-0 to Gent.

== Season overview ==
=== Pre-season ===
Not counting defender Zainoul Haidara, who had already signed a contract during the winter 2012–13 transfer window to join the club for the coming season, OHL announces its first signing for the new season with David Wijns, coming from Kortrijk. Wijns is a 26-year-old Belgian defender born in Leuven who played most of his career with Heist, helping the team move up two divisions into the Belgian Second Division before joining Kortrijk.

In the beginning of June, former Belgian international Kevin Roelandts, who was out on loan to Antwerp, signs for Maldegem and thus permanently leaves OH Leuven. Just a few days later, the Belgian Pro League fixtures for the 2013–14 season are announced on June 10. Oud-Heverlee Leuven opens the season with an away match to Kortrijk on 27 July 2013. Just like the previous season, Genk will be the first opponent to come and play at Den Dreef on matchday 2.

Just like Roelandts two weeks before, Nicky Hayen also leaves the club after a loan spell at Antwerp. Hayen becomes player-coach at Belgian Third Division team Dender EH.

First goalkeeper Logan Bailly, who had only recently signed a contract extension in December 2012, prolongs his contract again by two years on June 18, keeping him in Leuven until 2016. Two days later, OHL signs 29-year-old Belgian midfielder Mohamed Messoudi from Gent. Near the end of June yet another player out on loan leaves the club, when striker Christian Pouga, who was out on loan to Lierse, signs for Turkish team Ankaraspor in the Turkish Second Division.

In July, the team is very active on the transfer market, starting with four transfers occurring in the beginning of the month, with both Frederik Boi (to Cercle Brugge), Jonas De Roeck (to Antwerp) and Koen Weuts (to Helmond Sport) leaving the club, while Tom Pettersson is announced as a new player, arriving on loan from Åtvidaberg. OH Leuven states that they have also obtained a clause to activate a permanent transfer of the 23-year-old Swedish defender. One week later, three more incoming transfers are announced, as OHL brings in two international players, Belgian Marvin Ogunjimi and Bosnian Muhamed Subašić, both on loan respectively from Mallorca and Olimpic Sarajevo, together with a second Brazilian player Douglas Maia, who was a free agent. At the same time, OHL sees another two players depart the club, as striker Chuka and defender Tomislav Mikulić seek new challenges. Chuka has been with the team for two seasons, scoring many goals, while Mikulić had helped out to strengthen the defence during the last 6 months. Chuka moves to CFR Cluj, while Mikulić moves to Panthrakikos. The stream of transfers is interrupted by the news that wingback Günther Vanaudenaerde has fractured his tibia during the friendly against Heerenveen and will be out for at least three months. To replace this loss, OH Leuven signs international Bulgarian wingback Ivan Bandalovski, while youngsters Loris Brogno and Christopher Verbist are loaned out to second division team Lommel United to get more first team experience.

=== August ===
OHL suffers a bad start to the season, scoring only one point out of the first four matches, drawing away to newly promoted Oostende.

== First team squad ==
As of 31 August 2013. OHL Team 2013–14

Indicates that the player was only part of the team during the first half of the season
Indicates that the player was only part of the team during the second half of the season

No.	Name	Nationality	Date of birth (Age at 27/07/2013)	First match for OHL	Previous club/Signed From
Goalkeepers
1	Yves Lenaerts	Belgium	February 27, 1983 (aged 30)	2010	(Belgium) Club Brugge
21	Dean Michiels	Belgium	July 4, 1991 (aged 22)	2010	Youth Product
26	Logan Bailly	Belgium	December 27, 1985 (aged 27)	2012	(Germany) Mönchengladbach
Defenders
2	Tom Pettersson	Sweden	March 25, 1990 (aged 23)	2013	(Sweden) Åtvidaberg
3	Robson	Brazil	July 10, 1983 (aged 30)	2012	(Portugal) Marítimo
4	Wim Raymaekers	Belgium	April 4, 1985 (aged 28)	2010	(Belgium) Red Star Waasland
5	Kenny Thompson	Belgium	April 26, 1985 (aged 28)	2012	(Belgium) Lierse
15	Wout Bastiaens	Belgium	April 30, 1994 (aged 19)	2012	(Belgium) Westerlo
16	Cédric Buekers	Belgium	April 17, 1994 (aged 19)	2013	(Belgium) Sint-Truiden
18	David Wijns	Belgium	January 9, 1987 (aged 26)	2013	(Belgium) Kortrijk
23	Ivan Bandalovski	Bulgaria	November 23, 1986 (aged 26)	2013	(Bulgaria) CSKA Sofia
24	Ludovic Buysens	Belgium	March 16, 1986 (aged 27)	2012	(Belgium) Sint-Truiden
25	Muhamed Subašić	Bosnia and Herzegovina	March 19, 1988 (aged 25)	2013	(Bosnia and Herzegovina) Olimpic Sarajevo
28	Zainoul Haidara	Guinea	October 25, 1992 (aged 20)	2013	(Belgium) Bleid-Gaume
32	Günther Vanaudenaerde	Belgium	January 23, 1984 (aged 29)	2012	(Belgium) Westerlo
Midfielders
6	Kenneth Van Goethem	Belgium	February 12, 1984 (aged 29)	2010	(Belgium) KV Mechelen
7	Ovidy Karuru	Zimbabwe	January 23, 1989 (aged 24)	2012	(France) Boulogne
8	Karel Geraerts	Belgium	January 5, 1982 (aged 31)	2011	(Belgium) Club Brugge
10	Douglas Maia	Brazil	April 24, 1989 (aged 24)	2013	Free agent
17	Mohamed Messoudi	Belgium	January 7, 1984 (aged 29)	2013	(Belgium) Gent
20	Evariste Ngolok	Belgium	November 15, 1988 (aged 24)	2012	(Belgium) Westerlo
27	Stefán Gíslason	Iceland	March 15, 1980 (aged 33)	2012	(Norway) Lillestrøm
30	Simon Bracke	Belgium	November 17, 1995 (aged 17)	2011	Youth Product
Forwards
11	Alessandro Cerigioni	Belgium	September 30, 1992 (aged 20)	2013	(Belgium) Lommel United
12	Ibou	Gambia	September 7, 1986 (aged 26)	2012	(Belgium) Kortrijk
12	Marvin Ogunjimi	Belgium	October 12, 1987 (aged 25)	2013	(Spain) Mallorca
13	Bjorn Ruytinx	Belgium	August 18, 1980 (aged 32)	2004	(Belgium) Kermt-Hasselt
14	Thomas Azevedo	Belgium	August 31, 1991 (aged 21)	2011	(Belgium) Lommel United
22	Emmerik De Vriese	Belgium	February 14, 1985 (aged 28)	2011	(Belgium) Antwerp
29	Joren Dehond	Belgium	August 8, 1995 (aged 17)	2011	Youth Product
31	Ben Yagan	Belgium	February 9, 1995 (aged 18)	2012	Youth Product

== Transfers ==
=== In ===
==== Summer ====
Squad #	Position	Player	Transferred from	Fee	Date	Source
10	MF	(Brazil) Douglas Maia	Free Agent	NA	15 July 2013	
17	MF	(Belgium) Mohamed Messoudi	(Belgium) Gent	Undisclosed	22 May 2013	
18	DF	(Belgium) David Wijns	(Belgium) Kortrijk	Undisclosed	22 May 2013	
23	DF	(Bulgaria) Ivan Bandalovski	(Bulgaria) CSKA Sofia	Undisclosed	25 July 2013	

=== Loan in ===
==== Summer ====
Squad #	Position	Player	On loan from	Fee	Date	Source
2	DF	(Sweden) Tom Pettersson	(Sweden) Åtvidaberg	Undisclosed	2 July 2013	
12	FW	(Belgium) Marvin Ogunjimi	(Spain) Mallorca	Undisclosed	13 July 2013	
25	DF	(Bosnia and Herzegovina) Muhamed Subašić	(Bosnia and Herzegovina) Olimpic Sarajevo	Undisclosed	10 July 2013	

=== Out ===
==== Summer ====
Squad #	Position	Player	Transferred to	Fee	Date	Source
2	DF	(Croatia) Tomislav Mikulić	(Greece) Panthrakikos	Free (was on loan to	17 July 2013	
17	DF	(Belgium) Koen Weuts	(Netherlands) Helmond Sport	Free	5 July 2013	
18	DF	(Belgium) Jonas De Roeck	(Belgium) Antwerp	Free	1 July 2013	
23	FW	(Nigeria) Chuka	(Romania) CFR Cluj	Undisclosed	16 July 2013	
28	MF	(Saudi Arabia) Mazin Ahmed Al-Huthayfi	(Saudi Arabia) Ittihad	Loan Return	1 July 2013	
	MF	(Belgium) Frederik Boi	(Belgium) Cercle Brugge	Free (Was already on loan to Cercle Brugge, now released)	1 July 2013	
	MF	(Belgium) Kevin Roelandts	(Belgium) Maldegem	Free (Was on loan to Antwerp, now released to Maldegem)	6 June 2013	
	MF	(Belgium) Nicky Hayen	(Belgium) Dender EH	Free (Was on loan to Antwerp, now released to Dender EH)	14 June 2013	
	FW	(Cameroon) Christian Pouga	(Turkey) Ankaraspor	Free (Was on loan to Lierse, to Ankaraspor)	26 June 2013	

=== Loan out ===
==== Summer ====
Squad #	Position	Player	On loan to	Fee	Date	Source
19	FW	(Belgium) Loris Brogno	(Belgium) Lommel United	Undisclosed	31 July 2013	
25	FW	(Belgium) Christopher Verbist	(Belgium) Lommel United	Undisclosed	31 July 2013	

== Club ==
=== Coaching staff ===
Position	Staff
Head Coach	(Belgium) Ronny Van Geneugden
Assistant First Team Coach	(Netherlands) Arnold Rijsenburg
Assistant First Team Coach	(Belgium) Hans Vander Elst
Goalkeeping coach	(Belgium) Jurgen De Braekeleer

Last updated: 2 July 2013
Source: OHL.be

=== Other information ===
Owner/Chairman	(Belgium) Jan Callewaert
Ground (capacity and dimensions)	Den Dreef (9,493 / )

Updated to match played 21 May 2012
Source: OHL.be

== Competitions ==
Competition	Started round	Current position / round	Final position / round	First match	Last match
Belgian Pro League	—	—	15th	27 July 2013	16 March 2014
Belgian Cup	6th Round	—	7th Round	25 September 2013	4 December 2013

Updated to match played 16 May 2014
Source: Competitions

=== Friendly matches ===
==== Pre-season ====
22 June 2013	Linden (Belgium)	1 – 6	(Belgium) Oud-Heverlee Leuven	Kerkdreef, Linden
16:00 CEST	Valons 88'	(Report)	Buysens 8'; Ngolok 20'; Chuka 35'; Cerigioni 60', 65', 89'	Referee: Johan Verbist

26 June 2013	Kampenhout (Belgium)	0 – 7	(Belgium) Oud-Heverlee Leuven	De Zeype, Kampenhout
19:30 CEST		(Report)	Mikulić 7'; Pavlov 9'; Buysens 13'; Ibou 30'; Yagan 48'; Cerigioni 56', 63'

29 June 2013	Diegem (Belgium)	0 – 5	(Belgium) Oud-Heverlee Leuven	Gemeentelijk Sportstadion, Diegem
19:30 CEST		(Report)	Pavlov 9'; Bastiaens 21'; Ruytinx 48', 69'; Bracke 71'

3 July 2013	RKC (Netherlands)	1 – 3	(Belgium) Oud-Heverlee Leuven	sportpark Den Donk
19:00 CEST	Castelen 15'	Report	Ngolok 37'; Thompson 51'; Twumasi 71'

4 July 2013	Lommel United (Belgium)	Cancelled	(Belgium) Oud-Heverlee Leuven	Soevereinstadion, Lommel
19:00 CEST

4 July 2013	Anorthosis Famagusta (Cyprus)	2 – 2	(Belgium) Oud-Heverlee Leuven	Loenen
16:30 CEST	Rezek; Andić	Report	Maia; Twumasi

7 July 2013	Olympia Wijgmaal (Belgium)	0 – 3	(Belgium) Oud-Heverlee Leuven	Wijgmaal stadion, Wijgmaal
16:00 CEST		Report	Ngolok 30'; Dehond 46'; Buysens 75'

10 July 2013	Lierse (Belgium)	1 – 1	(Belgium) Oud-Heverlee Leuven	Tongerlo
19:00 CEST	Menga 89'	Report	Cerigioni 45'

13 July 2013	Antwerp (Belgium)	4 – 2	(Belgium) Oud-Heverlee Leuven	Bosuilstadion, Antwerp
20:00 CEST	Güvenç; S. Kil; Tano	Report	Cerigioni	Attendance: 4,500

16 July 2013	Heerenveen (Netherlands)	2 – 1	(Belgium) Oud-Heverlee Leuven	Complex Read Swart, De Knipe
19:00 CEST	Finnbogason; Savić	Report	Maia

19 July 2013	Bierbeek (Belgium)	0 – 9	(Belgium) Oud-Heverlee Leuven	Gemeentelijk Stadion, Bierbeek
19:00 CEST		Report	Verbist; Brogno; Dessers; Verschueren

20 July 2013	Oud-Heverlee Leuven (Belgium)	Cancelled	(Netherlands) NAC	Den Dreef, Heverlee
19:00 CEST

20 July 2013	Oud-Heverlee Leuven (Belgium)	0 – 1	(France) Troyes	Den Dreef, Heverlee
19:00 CEST		Report	Ngoyi 68'

==== During the season ====
9 January 2014	Hoffenheim (Germany)	2 – 0	(Belgium) Oud-Heverlee Leuven	Pinatar Arena, San Pedro del Pinatar
16:30 CET	Elyounoussi 4'; Firmino 8'	(Report)

10 January 2014	Mechelen (Belgium)	1 – 1	(Belgium) Oud-Heverlee Leuven	Pinatar Arena, San Pedro del Pinatar
15:30 CET	De Petter 60'	(Report)	Ngolok 29'

21 March 2014	Antwerp (Belgium)	1 – 0	(Belgium) Oud-Heverlee Leuven	Bosuilstadion, Antwerp
20:30 CET	Manset	Report

23 April 2014	Aalst (Belgium)	2 – 0	(Belgium) Oud-Heverlee Leuven	Pierre Cornelisstadion, Aalst
19:00 CEST	Janssens; Van Damme	(Report)

25 April 2014	Oud-Heverlee Leuven (Belgium)	1 – 1	(Belgium) Lierse	Den Dreef, Heverlee
	Ruytinx 30'	(Report)	Helal 39' (pen.)	Attendance: 0

=== Belgian Pro League ===
OHL's third season in the Belgian Pro League began on 27 July 2013.

==== League table ====
Pos	Team	Pld	W	D	L	GF	GA	GD	Pts	Qualification
12	Lierse	30	9	5	16	36	53	−17	32	Qualification for the Europa League play-offs
13	Mechelen	30	8	7	15	34	51	−17	31	Qualification for the Europa League play-offs
14	Waasland-Beveren	30	6	13	11	28	35	−7	31	Qualification for the Europa League play-offs
15	OH Leuven	30	6	9	15	30	47	−17	27	Qualification for the Relegation play-offs
16	Mons	30	6	4	20	29	53	−24	22	Qualification for the Relegation play-offs

Source: Belgian Pro League
Rules for classification: 1) points; 2) number of matches won; if teams are still tied a playoff is organised.

==== Results summary ====
Overall								Home						Away					
Pld	W	D	L	GF	GA	GD	Pts	W	D	L	GF	GA	GD	W	D	L	GF	GA	GD
30	6	9	15	30	47	−17	27	6	6	3	21	18	+3	0	3	12	9	29	−20

Last updated: 16 March 2014.

==== Points breakdown ====
Points at home: 24
Points away from home: 3
Points against 2012/13 Playoff 1 teams (6): 10 (27.78%)
Points against 2012/13 Playoff 2 teams (7): 12 (28.57%)
Points against 2012/13 Playoff 3 teams (1): 4 (75%)
Points against newly promoted teams (1): 1 (16.67%)

6 points: none
4 points: Cercle Brugge, Lierse
3 points: Anderlecht, Lokeren, Waasland-Beveren, Zulte Waregem
2 points: none
1 point: Charleroi, Gent, Kortrijk, Mechelen, Mons, Oostende, Standard
0 points: Club Brugge, Genk

==== Biggest and smallest ====
Biggest home win: 3–0 vs. Cercle Brugge
Biggest home defeat: 2–5 vs. Club Brugge; 1–4 vs. Genk
Biggest away win: none
Biggest away defeat: 0–3 vs. Genk

Biggest home attendance: 9,493 vs. Club Brugge and vs. Anderlecht
Smallest home attendance: 7,613 vs. Charleroi
Biggest away attendance: 23,751 vs. Standard Liège
Smallest away attendance: 3,850 vs. Mons

==== Results by round ====
Round	1	2	3	4	5	6	7	8	9	10	11	12	13	14	15	16	17	18	19	20	21	22	23	24	25	26	27	28	29	30
Ground	A	H	A	A	H	A	H	A	H	A	H	A	H	A	H	H	A	H	H	A	H	A	H	A	H	A	H	A	H	A
Result	L	L	D	L	W	D	D	L	D	L	W	L	D	L	W	D	L	D	L	L	W	L	W	L	D	L	L	D	W	L
Position	13	14	14	15	11	11	9	12	12	14	12	13	13	13	13	14	14	14	14	14	14	15	14	14	14	15	15	15	15	15

Updated to match(es) played on 16 March 2013. Source:
A = Away; H = Home; W = Win; D = Draw; L = Loss

==== Relegation playoff and Second Division final round ====
After finishing 15th during the regular season, OHL was forced to play the Relegation Playoff together with Mons. OHL started with a three-point head start and home advantage. After winning twice at home and drawing away, OHL had obtained an unattainable lead, causing Mons to be relegated. Meanwhile, OHL thereby won the right to play the Second Division final round which they needed to win to remain in the Belgian Pro League.

===== Final round table =====
Final standings
Team	Pld	W	D	L	GF	GA	GD	Pts
Mouscron-Péruwelz	6	3	2	1	8	6	+2	11
Eupen	6	2	2	2	9	11	−2	8
Sint-Truiden	6	2	1	3	10	11	−1	7
OH Leuven	6	2	1	3	6	5	+1	7

==== List of matches ====
27 July 2013 Matchday 1	Kortrijk	1 – 0	Oud-Heverlee Leuven	Guldensporen Stadion, Kortrijk
20:00 CEST	Santini 84'	Report	Ngolok (yellow card) 68'	Attendance: 5,829; Referee: Sam Loeman

3 August 2013 Matchday 2	Oud-Heverlee Leuven	1 – 4	Genk	Den Dreef, Heverlee
20:00 CEST	Messoudi (yellow card) 59'; Ngolok 86'	Report	Tshimanga (yellow card) 31'; Mbodj (yellow card) 40'; Vossen 45'; Buffel 61', 76'; Camus 63'	Attendance: 8,264; Referee: Tim Pots

10 August 2013 Matchday 3	Oostende	1 – 1	Oud-Heverlee Leuven	Albertpark, Ostend
20:00 CEST	Brouckaert 60' (pen.)	Report	Robson (yellow card) 32'; Messoudi 38' (pen.); Geraerts (yellow card) 59'; Dehond (yellow card) 82'	Attendance: 4,848; Referee: Denis Vanbecelaere

18 August 2013 Matchday 4	Standard Liège	1 – 0	Oud-Heverlee Leuven	Stade Maurice Dufrasne, Liège
14:30 CEST	Buysens 47' (o.g.); Iandoli (yellow card) 53'	Report	Thompson (yellow card) 79'; Bandalovski (yellow card) 90+2' (red card) 90+5'	Attendance: 23,751; Referee: Alexandre Boucaut

24 August 2013 Matchday 5	Oud-Heverlee Leuven	2 – 1	Lokeren	Den Dreef, Heverlee
20:00 CEST	Cerigioni (yellow card) 29'; Ngolok 60'; Ruytinx 71'; Messoudi (yellow card) 80'; Thompson (yellow card) 83'; Ngolok (yellow card) 85'; Geraerts (yellow card) 87'	Report	De Pauw (yellow card) 45+1'; Overmeire (yellow card) 55'; Harbaoui 57'; Vanaken (yellow card) 67'	Attendance: 7,706; Referee: Nicolas Laforge

31 August 2013 Matchday 6	Cercle Brugge	1 – 1	Oud-Heverlee Leuven	Jan Breydel Stadium, Bruges
20:00 CEST	Wils (yellow card) 35'; Etock 75'; Van Acker (yellow card) 90+1'	Report	Van Goethem (yellow card) 39'; Robson (yellow card) 50'; Azevedo (yellow card) 52'; Ngolok 60'; Ngolok (yellow card) 67'; Geraerts (yellow card) 73'	Attendance: 6,533; Referee: Jérôme Efong Nzolo

14 September 2013 Matchday 7	Oud-Heverlee Leuven	0 – 0	Charleroi	Den Dreef, Heverlee
20:00 CEST	Messoudi (yellow card) 49'; Ruytinx (yellow card) 74'	Report	N'Ganga (yellow card) 30'; Dewaest (yellow card) 38'; François (yellow card) 45+1'	Attendance: 7,613; Referee: Serge Gumienny

22 September 2013 Matchday 8	Zulte Waregem	4 – 2	Oud-Heverlee Leuven	Regenboogstadion, Waregem
20:30 CEST	Duplus (yellow card) 17'; Kums (yellow card) 48'; Habibou 59', 72'; Sylla 86'; Kums 90+2'	Report	Messoudi 9'; Ngolok (yellow card) 22'; Ngolok 61'; Messoudi (yellow card) 89'	Attendance: 6,614; Referee: Christophe Delacour

28 September 2013 Matchday 9	Oud-Heverlee Leuven	1 – 1	Gent	Den Dreef, Heverlee
20:00 CEST	Kostovski (yellow card) 24'; Ruytinx (yellow card) 31'; Ruytinx 65'; Bandalovski (yellow card) 67'	Report	Privat (yellow card) 29'; Maréval 32'; Diogo (yellow card) 41'	Attendance: 7,755; Referee: Wim Smet

5 October 2013 Matchday 10	Club Brugge	1 – 0	Oud-Heverlee Leuven	Jan Breydel Stadium, Bruges
20:00 CEST	Odjidja-Ofoe 35'; Lestienne (yellow card) 53' (yellow-red card) 56'; Jørgensen (yellow card) 89'	Report	Bandalovski (yellow card) 31'; Robson (yellow card) 45+2'; Van Goethem (yellow card) 58'	Attendance: 22,500; Referee: Sébastien Delferiere

19 October 2013 Matchday 11	Oud-Heverlee Leuven	4 – 2	Waasland-Beveren	Den Dreef, Heverlee
20:00 CEST	Ruytinx 18', 56'; Ruytinx (yellow card) 34'; Bojović 54' (o.g.); Ngolok 73'; Kostovski (yellow card) 86'	Report	D'Ulivo (yellow card) 31'; Marić 35'; Blondelle (yellow card) 44'; Godemèche (yellow card) 49'; Lebbihi 80'	Attendance: 8,103; Referee: Laurent Colemonts

26 October 2013 Matchday 12	Mechelen	4 – 2	Oud-Heverlee Leuven	Argosstadion Achter de Kazerne, Mechelen
20:00 CEST	Kamavuaka 30', 62'; Biset (yellow card) 67'; Cordaro (yellow card) 68' de Witte 82' (pen.); Destorme 90+2'	Report	Ruytinx (yellow card) 42'; Kostovski 45', 73'; Pettersson (red card) 82'; Robson (yellow card) 35' (yellow-red card) 86'; Messoudi (yellow card) 86'	Attendance: 9,500; Referee: Claude Bourdouxhe

30 October 2013 Matchday 13	Oud-Heverlee Leuven	2 – 2	Mons	Den Dreef, Heverlee
20:30 CET	Pettersson 39'; Ruytinx 45' (pen.); Ruytinx (yellow card) 45+1'	Report	Arbeitman 25'; Diandy 41' van Gijseghem (red card) 43'; Diandy (yellow card) 45+1'	Attendance: 8,683; Referee: Jonathan Lardot

2 November 2013 Matchday 14	Anderlecht	3 – 1	Oud-Heverlee Leuven	Constant Vanden Stock Stadium, Anderlecht
18:00 CET	Kljestan 43'; Mitrović 44', 81'; Vanden Borre (yellow card) 64' (yellow-red card) 90+1'	Report	Messoudi 69' (pen.); Pettersson (red card) 81'; Ngolok (yellow card) 79' (yellow-red card) 86'	Attendance: 20,000; Referee: Alexandre Boucaut

9 November 2013 Matchday 15	Oud-Heverlee Leuven	2 – 0	Lierse	Den Dreef, Heverlee
20:00 CET	Ruytinx 22'; Geraerts 24'; Thompson (yellow card) 50'; Raymaekers (yellow card) 52'; Ogunjimi (yellow card) 74'	Report	Traore (yellow card) 25'; Losada (yellow card) 61'; Menga (yellow card) 73'; Wils (yellow card) 87'; Ghaly (yellow card) 90+3'	Attendance: 8,320; Referee: Peter Vervecken

23 November 2013 Matchday 16	Oud-Heverlee Leuven	1 – 1	Kortrijk	Den Dreef, Heverlee
20:00 CET	Thompson (yellow card) 74'; Ruytinx 75'; Geraerts (yellow card) 81'	Report	De Mets (red card) 52'; Heylen (yellow card) 68'; De Smet 79'; De Smet (yellow card) 84'; Santini (yellow card) 86'	Attendance: 7,700; Referee: Erik Lambrechts

1 December 2013 Matchday 17	Genk	3 – 0	Oud-Heverlee Leuven	Cristal Arena, Genk
20:30 CET	Kumordzi 49'; Gorius 68', 87'	Report	Raymaekers (yellow card) 45'; Gíslason (yellow card) 66'; Van Goethem (yellow card) 79'	Attendance: 20,265; Referee: Claude Bourdouxhe

8 December 2013 Matchday 18	Oud-Heverlee Leuven	0 – 0	Standard Liège	Den Dreef, Heverlee
14:30 CET	Geraerts (yellow card) 36'; Cerigioni (red card) 41'; Ruytinx (yellow card) 45+1'	Report	Carcela (red card) 45+1'; Öztürk (yellow card) 77'; Van Damme (yellow card) 90+3'	Attendance: 8,099; Referee: Tim Pots

14 December 2013 Matchday 19	Oud-Heverlee Leuven	1 – 2	Oostende	Den Dreef, Heverlee
20:00 CET	Lukaku 28' (o.g.); Robson (yellow card) 53'; Azevedo (yellow card) 84'; Thompson (yellow card) 89'; Messoudi (yellow card) 86' (yellow-red card) 90+4'	Report	Mushekwi (yellow card) 45'; Luissint 58'; Wilmet 83'	Attendance: 8,029; Referee: Carlos Manuel Alho-Guerreiro

21 December 2013 Matchday 20	Lokeren	2 – 0	Oud-Heverlee Leuven	Daknamstadion, Lokeren
20:00 CET	Vanaken 44'; Corryn (yellow card) 45+1'; Harbaoui 73'	Report	Bandalovski (yellow card) 49'; Buysens (yellow card) 25' (yellow-red card) 56'; Kostovski (yellow card) 77'	Attendance: 6,671; Referee: Laurent Colemonts

26 December 2013 Matchday 21	Oud-Heverlee Leuven	3 – 0	Cercle Brugge	Den Dreef, Heverlee
14:30 CET	Kostovski 16'; Ruytinx 26', 56'; Pettersson (yellow card) 55'	Report	Van Acker (yellow card) 30' (yellow-red card) 45+1'; Cornelis (yellow card) 45+2'; Boi (yellow card) 58'	Attendance: 8,883; Referee: Luc Wouters

18 January 2014 Matchday 22	Charleroi	2 – 0	Oud-Heverlee Leuven	Stade du Pays de Charleroi, Charleroi
20:00 CET	Thiaré (red card) 73'; Gnohéré 84' (yellow card) 85'; Kebano 90+4'	Report	Gíslason (red card) 45'; Ruytinx (yellow card) 45+1'; Kostovski (yellow card) 90+1'	Attendance: 4,707; Referee: Nicolas Laforge

25 January 2014 Matchday 23	Oud-Heverlee Leuven	1 – 0	Zulte Waregem	Den Dreef, Heverlee
20:00 CET	Ngolok (yellow card) 21'; Bandalovski (yellow card) 47'; Van Eenoo 55'; Thompson (yellow card) 87'	Report	D'Haene (yellow card) 30'; N'Diaye (red card) 58'; Tarfi (yellow card) 84'	Attendance: 8,235; Referee: Denis Vanbecelaere

1 February 2014 Matchday 24	Gent	2 – 0	Oud-Heverlee Leuven	Ghelamco Arena, Ghent
20:00 CET	Puljić (yellow card) 35'; Pedersen 57'; Zukanović 69'; Neto (yellow card) 82'	Report	Wijns (yellow card) 45'; Bandalovski (yellow card) 57'; Geraerts (yellow card) 62'	Attendance: 17,409; Referee: Christof Virant

8 February 2014 Matchday 25	Oud-Heverlee Leuven	0 – 0	Mechelen	Den Dreef, Heverlee
20:00 CET	Thompson (yellow card) 58'; Karuru (yellow card) 80'	Report	Vandam (yellow card) 43'; Cordaro (yellow card) 44'; Ghomsi (yellow card) 85'	Attendance: 9,209; Referee: Laurent Colemonts

15 February 2014 Matchday 26	Waasland-Beveren	1 – 0	Oud-Heverlee Leuven	Freethiel Stadion, Beveren
20:00 CET	Oumarou 78'	Report	Messoudi (yellow card) 71'	Attendance: 6,218; Referee: Serge Gumienny

23 February 2014 Matchday 27	Oud-Heverlee Leuven	2 – 5	Club Brugge	Den Dreef, Heverlee
14:30 CET	Kostovski 58'; Ruytinx (yellow card) 78'; Reynaud 78'	Report	Meunier 1'; De Bock (yellow card) 16'; Refaelov 21'; Mechele (yellow card) 31'; Jørgensen 52'; De Sutter 56'; Lestienne 82'	Attendance: 9,493; Referee: Johan Verbist

1 March 2014 Matchday 28	Lierse	0 – 0	Oud-Heverlee Leuven	Herman Vanderpoortenstadion, Lier
20:00 CET	Jääger (yellow card) 26'	Report	Ngolok (yellow card) 19' (yellow-red card) 39'; Messoudi (yellow card) 39'; Kostovski (red card) 40'; Thompson (yellow card) 90+4'	Attendance: 7,375; Referee: Luc Wouters

23 February 2014 Matchday 29	Oud-Heverlee Leuven	1 – 0	Anderlecht	Den Dreef, Heverlee
20:00 CET	Ruytinx (yellow card) 49' (goal) 64'	Report		Attendance: 9,493; Referee: Sébastien Delferiere

16 March 2014 Matchday 30	Mons	3 – 2	Oud-Heverlee Leuven	Stade Charles Tondreau, Mons
18:00 CET	Monteyne 18'; Arbeitman 28'; Le Postollec (yellow card) 33'; Mununga (yellow card) 35'; Diandy (yellow card) 68'; Matthys 89' (pen.)	Report	Ibou 14' (pen.); Reynaud (yellow card) 35'; Messoudi (yellow card) 36'; Robson (yellow card) 78'; Geraerts 80' (red card) 90'	Attendance: 3,850; Referee: Tim Pots

29 March 2014 Rel. Playoff Matchday 1	Oud-Heverlee Leuven	2 – 0	Mons	Den Dreef, Heverlee
20:00 CET	Pettersson 26'; Cerigioni 50'; Reynaud (yellow card) 65'	Report		Attendance: 8,724; Referee: Johan Verbist

5 April 2014 Rel. Playoff Matchday 2	Mons	1 – 1	Oud-Heverlee Leuven	Stade Charles Tondreau, Mons
20:00 CEST	Le Postollec (yellow card) 13'; Matthys 21'; Lorenzi (yellow card) 29'; Dussenne (yellow card) 80'	Report	Bandalovski (yellow card) 17'; Geraerts (red card) 64'; Robson 90+1'	Attendance: 3,488; Referee: Luc Wouters

12 April 2014 Rel. Playoff Matchday 3	Oud-Heverlee Leuven	2 – 0	Mons	Den Dreef, Heverlee
20:00 CEST	Pettersson 39'; Ibou 78' (pen.); Croux (yellow card) 82'	Report	Le Postollec (yellow card) 39' (yellow-red card) 39'; Dussenne (yellow card) 42'; Mununga (yellow card) 90'	Attendance: 8,751; Referee: Serge Gumienny

3 May 2014 Second Div. Playoff Matchday 1	Oud-Heverlee Leuven	0 – 0	Mouscron-Péruwelz	Den Dreef, Heverlee
15:00 CEST	Robson (yellow card) 8'; Bandalovski (yellow card) 60'	Report	Michel (yellow card) 33'; Peyre (yellow card) 57'; Boli (yellow card) 59'; Pennacchio (yellow card) 85'	Attendance: 7,553; Referee: Serge Gumienny

8 May 2014 Second Div. Playoff Matchday 2	Eupen	0 – 3	Oud-Heverlee Leuven	Kehrweg Stadion, Eupen
20:30 CEST	Clinton (yellow card) 89'	Report	Cerigioni (yellow card) 22' (goal) 45+1', 54'; Ruytinx 64'	Attendance: 2,965; Referee: Jérôme Efong Nzolo

11 May 2014 Second Div. Playoff Matchday 3	Oud-Heverlee Leuven	0 – 1	Sint-Truiden	Den Dreef, Heverlee
15:00 CEST	Karuru (red card) 54'; Geraerts (yellow card) 59'; Ruytinx (yellow card) 63'	Report	Aarab (yellow card) 30'; Schils 74'; Iandoli (yellow card) 88'; Dalla Valle (red card) 90+4'	Attendance: 8,680; Referee: Sam Loeman

15 May 2014 Second Div. Playoff Matchday 4	Sint-Truiden	2 – 1	Oud-Heverlee Leuven	Stayen, Sint-Truiden
20:30 CEST	Aoulad (yellow card) 24' (goal) 35' (pen.), 65'; Schils (yellow card) 36' (yellow-red card) 53'; Moris (yellow card) 78'	Report	Bandalovski (yellow card) 6'; Thompson (yellow card) 22' (yellow-red card) 34'; Messoudi 77' (pen.); Robson (red card) 81'; Karuru (yellow card) 86'	Attendance: 6,500; Referee: Christof Dierick

18 May 2014 Second Div. Playoff Matchday 5	Mouscron-Péruwelz	1 – 0	Oud-Heverlee Leuven	Stade Le Canonnier, Mouscron
15:00 CEST	Peyre (yellow card) 55'; Badri 58'; Boli (yellow card) 90+4'	Report	Ibou (yellow card) 28'; Karuru (yellow card) 43'; Bailly (yellow card) 53'; Reynaud (yellow card) 82'	Referee: Frederik Geldhof

22 May 2014 Second Div. Playoff Matchday 6	Oud-Heverlee Leuven	2 – 1	Eupen	Den Dreef, Heverlee
20:30 CEST	Ngolok 13'; Thompson (yellow card) 14'; Ruytinx (yellow card) 52'; Bracke (yellow card) 75'; Cerigioni 81'	Report	Taulemesse 8' (yellow card) 40'; Mata (yellow card) 64'; Porcar (yellow card) 69'; Radebe (yellow card) 78'	Attendance: 7,103; Referee: Peter Vervecken

=== Belgian Cup ===
25 September 2013 6th round	Visé	0 – 2	Oud-Heverlee Leuven	Stade de la Cité de l'Oie, Visé
20:00 CEST		Report	Ruytinx 46'; Messoudi 49' (pen.)

4 December 2013 7th round	Gent	3 – 0	Oud-Heverlee Leuven	Ghelamco Arena, Ghent
20:30 CET	Pedersen 37' (pen.); Neto 58'; Privat 70'	Report	Ruytinx (yellow card) 82'
