= 2012–13 Oud-Heverlee Leuven season =

Oud-Heverlee Leuven
2012–13 season
- Chairman: (Belgium) Jan Callewaert
- Manager: (Belgium) Ronny Van Geneugden
- Stadium: Den Dreef
- Belgian Pro League: 10th
- Belgian Cup: Round 6
- Top goalscorer: League: Ibou, 19 goals All: Ibou, 19 goals
- Highest home attendance: 9,500 vs Club Brugge and vs Mechelen
- Lowest home attendance: 6,746 vs Cercle Brugge
Home colours	Away colours

The 2012–13 season was Oud-Heverlee Leuven's 11th competitive season in professional football. It was their second season in the Belgian Pro League. A promising start by OH Leuven and a 5-match winning streak in October resulted in a third place after 13 matchdays, but thereafter the team dropped in the standings to finally end 10th. In the playoffs, OH Leuven won their group but then lost the playoff final to Gent. In the Belgian Cup, OHL immediately lost their first match just like the previous season, this time going out to Oostende.

== Season Overview ==
=== April/May ===
On April 27, a first transfer for the new season is announced, as Belgian defender Kenny Thompson signs for OHL, coming from Lierse and two weeks later on May 14, OHL also signs Christopher Verbist from Standard Liège. Verbist played an impressive 2011–12 season in the Belgian Second Division, as he was on loan to Second Division champions Charleroi from Standard Liège.

On May 25, there is a lot of transfer activity at OHL, as two players leave and one is signed. Both Wingback Lionel Gendarme and central defender Pieter Nys decide to sign with a second division team. Gendarme moves to Oostende, while Nys moves to Dutch side Sparta. Meanwhile, on the same day, OHL confirms the signature of Günther Vanaudenaerde from recently relegated Westerlo. Due to injury, Vanaudenaerde missed most of the previous season.

=== June ===
Being founded in 2002, Oud-Heverlee Leuven celebrates its tenth anniversary. During the festivities, results of the "merit" award are presented. Through a web poll, the OHL fans chose François Sterchele as the player having the most merit during the ten inaugural years. Sterchele played for OHL during the 2004–05 season, in which OHL successfully promoted to the Belgian Second Division, with Sterchele the club top scorer, including eight goals during the promotion playoffs. Other players completing the top 5 were (in order): Bjorn Ruytinx, Jordan Remacle, Joeri Vastmans and Hans Goethuys.

After signing Günther Vanaudenaerde from Westerlo earlier, OHL confirms also the signing of Westerlo youngster Wout Bastiaens on June 5 and announces a few days later that another promising youngster joins the squad as Ben Yagan (17) is promoted from the reserve team to the first team for the coming season.

On June 11, the Belgian Pro League fixtures for the 2012–13 season are announced. Oud-Heverlee Leuven opens the season with an away match to Mons on 28 July 2012. One week later, Genk will be the opponent for the first home match. Later that same day, OHL first announces that Arnold Rijsenburg has signed as part of the staff, becoming the second assistant first team coach for head manager Ronny Van Geneugden, before spreading the news that the club has signed yet another Belgian defender. Twenty-six-year-old Ludovic Buysens has signed a two-year deal, signing from recently relegated Sint-Truiden.

Three days later, OHL sign a fifth Belgian defender with Jonas De Roeck. The experienced 32-year-old was a free player after his contract had expired at Bundesliga team Augsburg. Meanwhile, Sint-Truiden announce the signing of Maxime Annys from OHL on their website. Annys had been with OHL since 2009, but was deemed surplus and allowed to leave.

In need of a new goalkeeper since the departure of Thomas Kaminski following the end of the previous season, OHL finally choose to sign Logan Bailly. With Bailly, OHL sign a 26 year old Belgian international goalkeeper, who has already gained 8 caps for the Red Devils. Bailly gained fame when playing for Genk, leading to a lucrative transfer to Borussia Mönchengladbach in 2008. After some less successful loans, Bailly now moves to OHL, hoping to relaunch his career under Ronny Van Geneugden, who he knows from his period at Genk. Bailly is given a one-year contract.

Initial signs were already bad as Captain Bjorn Ruytinx was forced to walk off the field with a swollen knee during the friendly match against Kampenhout on 27 June, but two days later the feared news is confirmed that Ruytinx has indeed suffered an anterior cruciate ligament injury. Ruytinx, who had just signed a one-year contract extension in March 2012 to perform one more season for Oud-Heverlee Leuven, is now expected to be out for about 6 months.

On the last day of June 2012, OHL announce the signing of Gambian forward Ibou, who signs a three-year contract with an optional extra season. He is transferred from Kortrijk, where he has played since 2008, although that includes a six-month loan to Mechelen and a season-long loan to Mons. Later that same day, news is released that new signings Logan Bailly and Kenny Thompson are both out for weeks. Goalkeeper Bailly has suffered a broken finger during training, while Thompson is suffering from meningitis.

=== July ===
Although it was already known that Ghanaian striker Ibrahim Salou was going to be released, the news becomes official only when Belgian Third Division team La Louvière Centre announce the signing of Salou on their website on July 18. OHL draws much more media attention on July 20, when the transfer of last season OHL top scorer Jordan Remacle to Gent is now officially announced. Following weeks of rumours considering the future of Remacle, who requested a transfer and even handed in a doctors note to allow him to stay absent from training, the deal is now complete. One day later, this is followed by the news of signing Evariste Ngolok, a Belgian midfielder. After Wout Bastiaens and Günther Vanaudenaerde, Ngolok is the third player coming from Westerlo to sign for OHL.

In their opening match of the 2012–13 Belgian Pro League on July 28, Oud-Heverlee Leuven suffer a heavy loss, going down 5–2 away to Mons, with goals for OHL coming from Karel Geraerts and new signing Ibou, who scores his first goal for OHL.

=== August ===
OHL presents the team kits for the new season, the main difference being that the logo of head sponsor Option is now blending in with the shirt. The home kits remain white, while the away kits will now be green, with the third kit being coloured red. Head coach Ronny Van Geneugden claims it to be "a youthful kit, matching the youthful character of our supporters, who will surely identify themselves with it". One day later, the 5 000th season ticket is sold. This is a large increase of the record for OH Leuven, as the record stood at 4 772, set during the previous season.

Playing for the first time in their new kits, the team bounce back from trailing 0–2 with 15 minutes to go, to draw 2–2 with Genk in their first home match of the season. During that same match, defender Günther Vanaudenaerde tears one of the muscles in his abdomen and is expected to be out for 4 to 6 weeks.

The following week, transfer activity is again increased, as OHL loans out three Belgian players to Belgian Second Division team Antwerp. Defender Nicky Hayen and midfielders Kevin Roelandts and Jorn Vermeulen join the Antwerp team for one season, while Christian Pouga is presented as the latest new signing. The 26 year old striker from Cameroon is signed from Portuguese team Marítimo.

Only 34 seconds into the match against Gent, Ibou scores his third of the season. Eventually the match against the new team of Jordan Remacle ends in a 1–1 draw, a small revenge for OHL after the 6–1 loss during the previous season. One week later, OHL books a first win, coming back twice to beat Cercle Brugge 3–2 at home, with Evariste Ngolok scoring his first goal for OHL. Other goals came from Ibou and Geraerts.

Although various media already reported the coming of Ivorian defender Ali Bamba to OHL on loan from Le Mans, the deal is cancelled on 21 August 2012 after Bamba fails his medical tests.

Against an Anderlecht squad in which no less than 8 first team players have been replaced to keep them fresh for their upcoming Champions League fixture, OHL draws 1–1 at Den Dreef. For the fifth game in a row, Ibou gets on the scoresheet, thereby taking the lead in the goal scorer standings, however he also suffers an injury, causing him to be sidelined for about a week.

On the last day of the transfer window, OHL confirmed the signing of the 23-year-old Zimbabwean midfielder Ovidy Karuru from French side US Boulogne. It was also announced that Antoine Palate would be loaned for one season to Diegem Sport in the Belgian Third Division.

=== September ===
An injury time goal from Christian Pouga secures one point for OHL away to Lierse. The absence of Ibou is clear on the pitch, as OHL struggles to create big scoring opportunities.

OHL enters the draw for the Belgian Cup and is drawn away to Belgian Second Division team Oostende in the 16th finals. Should OH Leuven get past Oostende, they will play another away game, against the winner of the match between Brussels and Waasland-Beveren.

After one week break because of international football, OHL plays a dull match at home against Zulte Waregem. With just under ten minutes to play, Zulte Waregem scores the only goal of the match to give OHL a first home loss of the season. OHL also drops into 14th position, just two points clear of the relegation zone.

Available as a free player, OH Leuven adds 29-year-old Brazilian defender Robson to the squad on September 20, giving him a one-year contract with a possible one-year extension. Robson had been training with the team already for several weeks and previously played for Marítimo, alongside Christian Pouga.

Although Lokeren took the lead twice, OHL manages to keep one point in the away match at Daknam, with first Wim Raymaekers equalizing to 1–1 and finally Karel Geraerts scoring the 2–2 equaliser just before the end of the match. During the following midweek match, OHL is kicked straight out of the cup in their first match, for the second consecutive season. Against Oostende, a red card for Ludovic Buysens and a handling error by Logan Bailly leading to the opening goal allow the second division team to eventually win easily, by a score of 2–1. For OHL, youngster Joren Dehond manages to score his first goal of the season.

After the disappointing cup loss, OHL responds with a spectacular home win against newly promoted Waasland-Beveren. After two goals from Christian Pouga and a stunning free kick by Stefán Gíslason, Ibou completes the game with two more goals, the last one in injury time just seconds after he missed a penalty kick.

=== October ===
In October, OHL continues where they left off and even improves their level, extending the streak of consecutive matches won to five. First the team starts with a 0–4 win away to Charleroi in which Chuka, who had been struggling to find the net, completes a hattrick. The final goal came again from Ibou, who now ties with Club Brugge striker Carlos Bacca for the lead in the standings for top scorer with 8 goals. Thereafter, a previously undefeated Club Brugge comes to lose at Den Dreef. After going down already with under five minutes played due to a goal from Carlos Bacca, Ibou scores a hattrick to race past Bacca in the top scorers' standings with 11 goals from the same number of matches. Ovidy Karuru adds his first goal for OHL to result in a final 4–1 score. With the win, OH Leuven moves into position 6 in the standings. Also, for the first time since the expansion of Den Dreef to a capacity of 9.500, OHL plays in front of a sellout crowd. Since the 1970s, there have not been that number of supporters at a football match in the region.

The fourth win is achieved away to Beerschot, where OHL struggled for an hour until Kenneth Van Goethem put the ball past Stijn Stijnen. After taking the lead, the team controlled the flow of play and extended the lead further through goals from Karel Geraerts and Stefán Gíslason. In injury time, Hernán Losada scored the consolation goal for Beerschot from a penalty kick. During a midweek match, OHL moves into third place in the standings after the winning streak is extended to five matches against KV Mechelen. For a second consecutive sellout crowd and with only 52 seconds played, Christian Pouga heads in the first goal from an assist by Ibou. After an equalizer by Mechelen, OHL scores two more goals through Chuka and Ibou to win the match 3–1. Downside is the injury of central defender Wim Raymaekers, who suffers a knee injury during the first half. Although the injury is less severe than originally feared, Raymaekers still has to undergo surgery and is thereafter estimated to be out for 4 to 5 months.

=== November ===
After moving into third position following the month of October, OHL starts struggling in November. A 2–0 loss away to Standard Liège is followed by a lacklustre 0–0 draw at home against Kortrijk and a loss against Mons, also at Den Dreef. In the latter match, an error by Jonas De Roeck allows Mons striker Jérémy Perbet to score the opening goal after just two minutes. Thereafter, Perbet completes a hattrick which means the late goal by Christian Pouga is no more than a consolation. OHL ends the month with a positive note however, as the team holds Genk to a 1–1 draw, with Ibou converting an injury time penalty to grab the point in Genk. With that, OHL moves into 8th place, seemingly headed for a safe mid-table position as the gap with the relegation zone has grown to 11 points.

=== December ===
Although Karel Geraerts manages to equalise after an early goal by Gent, OHL fails to win, as the home game ends in a 1–1 draw. One day later, 26-year-old first goalkeeper Logan Bailly signs a 1-year contract extension, keeping him in Leuven until 2014.

One week after the draw with Gent, OHL scores a third consecutive 1–1 draw, away to bottom league team Cercle Brugge. Both goals are scored through a penalty kick, with the goal from Ibou cancelled out by Eiður Guðjohnsen. Although a fourth 1–1 draw would have been welcome away to Anderlecht to deny them an eight consecutive league win, OH Leuven does lose by a score of 2–1, the first-ever loss by OHL against Anderlecht in the league. Ibou scored the goal for OHL after a fast counterattack and as OH Leuven had several opportunities, coach Van Geneugden states:"I have congratulated my players after the match because we should be proud of our achievement today". Nevertheless, OH Leuven has now suffered 7 matches without a win.

Just two weeks after first goalkeeper Bailly, it is now second goalkeeper Yves Lenaerts who prolongs his contract. In contrary to Bailly however, Lenaerts extends his contract by three seasons, to 2016.

The non-winning streak of OHL continues, as before the end of the year, two more matches are played without a win. First Lierse, who are fighting to avoid relegation, come to Den Dreef to score a point in a 2–2 draw, with Ibou and Geraerts scoring the goals for the Leuven team. Thereafter, OHL loses against overachievers Zulte Waregem due to an injury-time winner by Habib Habibou. A late goal by Chuka had cancelled out an earlier goal by Habibou and seemed to be giving OHL a point, but Habibou decided otherwise. OHL thus finishes the year in 10th place with 28th points out of 22 matches, just one point less than the team earned during the whole 2011–12 Belgian Pro League.

Right before the end of the year, captain Kenneth Van Goethem is the third player to extend his contract. The midfielder adds three years and now has a contract until 2016.

=== January ===
With the winter transfer window opening, several teams in the Belgian Pro League decide to make some changes in their personnel. In the first week of 2013, OHL announces three new transfers: on 1 January, 18-year-old Belgian defender Cédric Buekers is signed from Belgian Second Division team Sint-Truiden until 2015, two days later the team also announces that two more players have been signed: 20-year-old Belgian striker Alessandro Cerigioni comes from Lommel United and is signed immediately, while defender Zainoul Haidara from Guinea will finish the season with his team FC Bleid-Gaume in the Belgian Third Division and join OHL in the summer of 2013.

OH Leuven continues to give players contract extensions, as both young striker Ben Yagan (18) and experienced Brazilian central defender Robson (29) prolong their stay in Leuven. Yagan is signed until 2015, Robson until 2016. One day later, Frederik Boi leaves the club as he moves back to his former team Cercle Brugge on loan. Due to several minor injuries, Boi had played only a few matches and had asked to be transferred and not to participate in the winter training camp with the rest of the team in Malta. With the contract of Boi expiring in 2013, it seems unlikely to see him return to OHL.

In the first match after the winter break, Lokeren holds a 0–2 lead at half-time through two goals by Benjamin Mokulu. Goals by Thomas Azevedo and Karel Geraerts allow OHL to draw level, but thereafter Lokeren manages to score four more goals to end the game 2–6. Although Waasland-Beveren only played with 10 players for almost 35 minutes after a red card, the non-winning streak continues and grows to 11 matches as OH Leuven loses 2–0 in Beveren.

Two more transfers are completed before the end of the transfer window: 31-year-old Croatian central defender Tomislav Mikulić is signed on loan from Beerschot until the end of the season, while striker Christian Pouga is loaned out to Lierse until the end of the season.

=== February ===
A goal by Chuka ends the spell without a win as it proves enough to beat Charleroi at home. For OHL it is the first win since 31 October, which could have been followed by a second win away to Club Brugge as the team were leading 0–1 with only half an hour to play, with former Club Brugge player Karel Geraerts putting OHL in front. However, after a red card for Kenny Thompson, Brugge took control and won 3–1. OHL again fails to win one week later against bottom league team Beerschot, with a late equalizer by Benito Raman cancelling out the goal by Ibou. However, the team responds with a 1–2 away win to Mechelen, with Koen Weuts and Chuka getting on the scoresheet. During that same match, Mazin Ahmed Al-Huthayfi is brought in as a substitute during the injury time. The signing of Al-Huthayfi had not been announced, causing eyebrows to be raised as to who was this player. Apparently, Al-Huthayfi was signed on loan from Ittihad FC until the end of the season.

=== March ===
OHL ends the regular season in a bad way after suffering a severe 0–4 loss at home against Standard Liège, with Imoh Ezekiel scoring for Standard after only 13 seconds, after which Logan Bailly saves a last minute penalty to keep Kortrijk to a 0–0 draw. Overall, OH Leuven was never in any danger of relegation and ends the season safely in tenth place with 36 points. Regarding the playoffs, the team is paired with Charleroi, Mechelen and Waasland-Beveren, against which the team scored 15 out of 18 points.

OHL starts the playoffs with a 3–1 victory over Waasland-Beveren. Youngsters Alessandro Cerigioni and Joren Dehond score their first league goal for Leuven, with the other goals coming from Chuka (for OHL) and Stijn De Smet for Waasland-Beveren.

=== April & May ===
The month of April starts with the news that Icelandic midfielder Stefán Gíslason signs a new contract to keep him with Leuven for another season, until 2014.

The victory against Waasland-Beveren is not followed up with more good performances, as Charleroi first takes revenge for the 0–4 loss during the regular competition, beating OHL 3–0 in Charleroi, after which Leuven loses again by three goals to nil, now at home to KV Mechelen. OH Leuven thereby drops to the last position in the group with only three points, but all is still open, as after three matches Charleroi has five points, while both KV Mechelen and Waasland-Beveren have four points.

After being down 1–0 at halftime to KV Mechelen in Mechelen, the season seems to be finished for OHL, but in the second half OHL comes back, scoring no less than five goals to take the win. Two goals came from Ibou, with the others provided by Alessandro Cerigioni, Tomislav Mikulić and Robson. In the following match at home against Charleroi, Ibou fails to score a penalty kick, which proves costly as the match ends 0–0. With three teams tied on 7 points and only Waasland-Beveren trailing on 5 points, OHL knows that a win away to Waasland-Beveren will win the group unless KV Mechelen wins by a larger margin in Charleroi. Mechelen grasps a late 1–2 win due to an injury time goal, but captain Bjorn Ruytinx, injured for most of the season and returning for the first time again in the starting lineup, scores a vital goal to hand OH Leuven the win against Waasland-Beveren. With that, OHL wins group B of the playoffs and will face group A winners Gent. With negotiations and rumours ongoing for a few weeks already, club icon Bjorn Ruytinx signs a new contract tying him to the club for one more season, until 2014.

In the playoff final, OHL proves to be no match for Gent, twice losing by four goals to one, first in Leuven, then in Ghent. The goals for Leuven came from Bjorn Ruytinx (at home) and Evariste Ngolok (in Ghent). With that, the season ends for OHL.

== Team kit ==
The team kits for the 2012–13 season are produced by Vermarc and the main shirt sponsor is Option which is displayed on the front center of the shirt. Other sponsors featuring on the kit: Rayden Transport and Vermarc (shirt front), Dataflow and Lotto (shirt back), Tegel Concept (shirt sleeves) and Rayden Transport, GMS Leuven, Stad Leuven and Mercedes (shorts). OHL still plays in white during home matches, but now has green as primary colour for the away matches. A red outfit is available also as third kit. The goalkeeper kit is normally green during home matches and red during away matches, keeping in mind that it always needs to differ enough from the kit colour of the opponents.

Home	Away

== First team squad ==
As of 15 January 2013. OHL Team 2012-13

Indicates that the player was only part of the team during the first half of the season
Indicates that the player was only part of the team during the second half of the season

No.	Name	Nationality	Date of birth (Age at 28/07/2012)	First match for OHL	Previous club/Signed From
Goalkeepers
1	Yves Lenaerts	Belgium	February 27, 1983 (aged 29)	2010	(Belgium) Club Brugge
21	Dean Michiels	Belgium	July 4, 1991 (aged 21)	2010	Youth Product
26	Logan Bailly	Belgium	December 27, 1985 (aged 26)	2012	(Germany) Mönchengladbach
Defenders
2	Tomislav Mikulić	Croatia	January 4, 1982 (aged 30)	2013	(Belgium) Beerschot
3	Robson	Brazil	July 10, 1983 (aged 29)	2012	(Portugal) Marítimo
4	Wim Raymaekers	Belgium	April 4, 1985 (aged 27)	2010	(Belgium) Red Star Waasland
5	Kenny Thompson	Belgium	April 26, 1985 (aged 27)	2012	(Belgium) Lierse
15	Wout Bastiaens	Belgium	April 30, 1994 (aged 18)	2012	(Belgium) Westerlo
16	Cédric Buekers	Belgium	April 17, 1994 (aged 18)	2013	(Belgium) Sint-Truiden
17	Koen Weuts	Belgium	September 18, 1990 (aged 21)	2009	(Belgium) Lierse
18	Jonas De Roeck	Belgium	December 20, 1979 (aged 32)	2012	(Germany) Augsburg
24	Ludovic Buysens	Belgium	March 16, 1986 (aged 26)	2012	(Belgium) Sint-Truiden
32	Günther Vanaudenaerde	Belgium	January 23, 1984 (aged 28)	2012	(Belgium) Westerlo
Midfielders
2	Frederik Boi	Belgium	October 25, 1981 (aged 30)	2011	(Belgium) Cercle Brugge
6	Kenneth Van Goethem	Belgium	February 12, 1984 (aged 28)	2010	(Belgium) KV Mechelen
7	Ovidy Karuru	Zimbabwe	January 23, 1989 (aged 23)	2012	(France) Boulogne
8	Karel Geraerts	Belgium	January 5, 1982 (aged 30)	2011	(Belgium) Club Brugge
20	Evariste Ngolok	Belgium	November 15, 1988 (aged 23)	2012	(Belgium) Westerlo
27	Stefán Gíslason	Iceland	March 15, 1980 (aged 32)	2012	(Norway) Lillestrøm
30	Simon Bracke	Belgium	November 17, 1995 (aged 16)	2011	Youth Product
Forwards
9	Christian Pouga	Cameroon	June 19, 1986 (aged 26)	2012	(Portugal) Marítimo
11	Alessandro Cerigioni	Belgium	September 30, 1992 (aged 19)	2013	(Belgium) Lommel United
12	Ibou	Gambia	September 7, 1986 (aged 25)	2012	(Belgium) Kortrijk
13	Bjorn Ruytinx	Belgium	August 18, 1980 (aged 31)	2004	(Belgium) Kermt-Hasselt
14	Thomas Azevedo	Belgium	August 31, 1991 (aged 20)	2011	(Belgium) Lommel United
19	Loris Brogno	Belgium	September 18, 1992 (aged 19)	2012	(Belgium) Charleroi
22	Emmerik De Vriese	Belgium	February 14, 1985 (aged 27)	2011	(Belgium) Antwerp
23	Chuka	Nigeria	March 19, 1990 (aged 22)	2011	(Qatar) Umm Salal
25	Christopher Verbist	Belgium	October 8, 1991 (aged 20)	2012	(Belgium) Standard Liège
28	Mazin Ahmed Al-Huthayfi	Saudi Arabia	July 29, 1985 (aged 26)	2013	(Saudi Arabia) Ittihad FC
29	Joren Dehond	Belgium	August 8, 1995 (aged 16)	2011	Youth Product
31	Ben Yagan	Belgium	February 9, 1995 (aged 17)	2012	Youth Product

== Transfers ==
=== In ===
==== Summer ====
Squad #	Position	Player	Transferred from	Fee	Date	Source
3	DF	(Brazil) Robson Severino da Silva	(Portugal) Marítimo	Undisclosed	20 August 2012	
5	DF	(Belgium) Kenny Thompson	(Belgium) Lierse	Undisclosed	27 April 2012	
7	MF	(Zimbabwe) Ovidy Karuru	(France) Boulogne	Undisclosed	30 August 2012	
9	FW	(Cameroon) Christian Pouga	(Portugal) Marítimo	Undisclosed	9 August 2012	
12	FW	(The Gambia) Ibou	(Belgium) Kortrijk	Undisclosed	30 June 2012	
15	DF	(Belgium) Wout Bastiaens	(Belgium) Westerlo	Undisclosed	5 June 2012	
18	DF	(Belgium) Jonas De Roeck	(Germany) Augsburg	Undisclosed	14 June 2012	
20	MF	(Belgium) Evariste Ngolok	(Belgium) Westerlo	Undisclosed	21 July 2012	
24	DF	(Belgium) Ludovic Buysens	(Belgium) Sint-Truiden	Undisclosed	11 June 2012	
25	FW	(Belgium) Christopher Verbist	(Belgium) Charleroi (on loan from (Belgium) Standard Liège)	Undisclosed	14 May 2012	
26	GK	(Belgium) Logan Bailly	(Germany) Mönchengladbach	Undisclosed	22 June 2012	
32	DF	(Belgium) Günther Vanaudenaerde	(Belgium) Westerlo	Undisclosed	25 May 2012	

==== Winter ====
Squad #	Position	Player	Transferred from	Fee	Date	Source
11	FW	(Belgium) Alessandro Cerigioni	(Belgium) Lommel United	Undisclosed	3 January 2013	
16	DF	(Belgium) Cédric Buekers	(Belgium) Sint-Truiden	Undisclosed	1 January 2013	

=== Loan In ===
==== Winter ====
Squad #	Position	Player	On loan from	Fee	Date	Source
2	DF	(Croatia) Tomislav Mikulić	(Belgium) Beerschot	Undisclosed	25 January 2013	
28	FW	(Saudi Arabia) Mazin Ahmed Al-Huthayfi	(Saudi Arabia) Ittihad	Undisclosed	February 2013	

=== Out ===
==== Summer ====
Squad #	Position	Player	Transferred to	Fee	Date	Source
7	MF	(Belgium) Jordan Remacle	(Belgium) Gent	Undisclosed	20 July 2012	
8	MF	(Belgium) Maxime Annys	(Belgium) Sint-Truiden	Free	18 June 2012	
9	FW	(Ghana) Ibrahim Salou	(Belgium) La Louvière Centre	Free	18 July 2012	
11	MF	(Ukraine) Sacha Iakovenko	(Belgium) Anderlecht	Loan Return	1 June 2012	
15	DF	(Belgium) Pieter Nys	(Netherlands) Sparta	Undisclosed	25 May 2012	
18	MF	(Belgium) Floribert N'Galula	Free Agent	Released	1 June 2012	
24	DF	(Czech Republic) Radek Dejmek	(Czech Republic) Slovan Liberec	Loan Return	1 June 2012	
25	MF	(Senegal) Christophe Diandy	(Belgium) Anderlecht	Loan Return	1 June 2012	
26	DF	(Belgium) Lionel Gendarme	(Belgium) Oostende	Undisclosed	25 May 2012	
	FW	(Belgium) Simon Vermeiren	(Belgium) Heist	Free (Was on loan to Olympia Wijgmaal, now released)	10 May 2012	
	MF	(Belgium) Nicolas De Mol	(Belgium) Tienen	Free (Was on loan to Olympia Wijgmaal, now released)	30 May 2012	
	GK	(Belgium) Fred Desomberg	(Belgium) Tienen	Free (Was on loan to Olympia Wijgmaal, now released)	31 May 2012	
	FW	(Belgium) Tail Schoonjans	(Belgium) Sint-Niklaas	Free (Was already on loan to Sint-Niklaas, now released)	2 June 2012	
	DF	(Belgium) Raf Verhamme	(Belgium) Tienen	Free (Was on loan to Olympia Wijgmaal, now released)	17 June 2012	

=== Loan Out ===
==== Summer ====
Squad #	Position	Player	Transferred to	Fee	Date	Source
3	DF	(Belgium) Nicky Hayen	(Belgium) Antwerp	Undisclosed	8 August 2012	
10	MF	(Belgium) Kevin Roelandts	(Belgium) Antwerp	Undisclosed	8 August 2012	
16	MF	(Belgium) Jorn Vermeulen	(Belgium) Antwerp	Undisclosed	8 August 2012	
28	MF	(Belgium) Antoine Palate	(Belgium) Diegem Sport	Undisclosed	30 August 2012	

==== Winter ====
Squad #	Position	Player	Transferred to	Fee	Date	Source
2	DF	(Belgium) Frederik Boi	(Belgium) Cercle Brugge	Undisclosed	11 January 2013	
9	FW	(Cameroon) Christian Pouga	(Belgium) Lierse	Undisclosed	31 January 2013	

== Statistics ==
=== Appearances and goals ===
Last updated on 19 May 2013.

No.	Pos	Nat	Player	Total		Belgian Pro League		Belgian Cup	
No.	Pos	Nat	Player	Apps	Goals	Apps	Goals	Apps	Goals
1	GK	(Belgium) BEL	Yves Lenaerts	1	0	0+1	0	0	0
2	DF	(Croatia) CRO	Tomislav Mikulić	13	1	13	1	0	0
3	DF	(Brazil) BRA	Robson	28	1	27+1	1	0	0
4	DF	(Belgium) BEL	Wim Raymaekers	13	1	13	1	0	0
5	DF	(Belgium) BEL	Kenny Thompson	23	0	20+2	0	1	0
6	MF	(Belgium) BEL	Kenneth Van Goethem	31	1	31	1	0	0
7	MF	(Zimbabwe) ZIM	Ovidy Karuru	22	1	13+8	1	1	0
8	MF	(Belgium) BEL	Karel Geraerts	33	8	32	8	1	0
11	FW	(Belgium) BEL	Alessandro Cerigioni	9	2	8+1	2	0	0
12	FW	(The Gambia) GAM	Ibou	36	19	35+1	19	0	0
13	FW	(Belgium) BEL	Bjorn Ruytinx	14	2	3+11	2	0	0
14	MF	(Belgium) BEL	Thomas Azevedo	29	1	6+22	1	1	0
15	DF	(Belgium) BEL	Wout Bastiaens	1	0	1	0	0	0
16	DF	(Belgium) BEL	Cédric Buekers	0	0	0	0	0	0
17	DF	(Belgium) BEL	Koen Weuts	26	1	23+2	1	1	0
18	DF	(Belgium) BEL	Jonas De Roeck	15	0	12+3	0	0	0
19	FW	(Belgium) BEL	Loris Brogno	8	0	2+5	0	0+1	0
20	MF	(Belgium) BEL	Evariste Ngolok	28	2	22+6	2	0	0
21	GK	(Belgium) BEL	Dean Michiels	0	0	0	0	0	0
22	MF	(Belgium) BEL	Emmerik De Vriese	0	0	0	0	0	0
23	FW	(Nigeria) NGA	Chuka	38	8	31+6	8	1	0
24	DF	(Belgium) BEL	Ludovic Buysens	18	0	11+6	0	1	0
25	FW	(Belgium) BEL	Christopher Verbist	2	0	1	0	1	0
26	GK	(Belgium) BEL	Logan Bailly	39	0	38	0	1	0
27	DF	(Iceland) ISL	Stefán Gíslason	30	2	28+1	2	1	0
28	FW	(Saudi Arabia) KSA	Mazin Ahmed Al-Huthayfi	2	0	0+2	0	0	0
29	FW	(Belgium) BEL	Joren Dehond	6	2	0+5	1	0+1	1
30	MF	(Belgium) BEL	Simon Bracke	0	0	0	0	0	0
31	FW	(Belgium) BEL	Ben Yagan	12	0	6+6	0	0	0
32	DF	(Belgium) BEL	Günther Vanaudenaerde	33	0	31+1	0	1	0
Players who are out on loan
2	MF	(Belgium) BEL	Frederik Boi	2	0	2	0	0	0
9	FW	(Cameroon) CMR	Christian Pouga	20	5	9+10	5	0+1	0

=== Top scorers ===
Includes all competitive matches.

==== Goals ====
Total	Player		Goals per Round																																						
Total	Player		1	2	3	4	5	6	7	8	CupR7	9	10	11	12	13	14	15	16	17	18	19	20	21	22	23	24	25	26	27	28	29	30	PO1	PO2	PO3	PO4	PO5	PO6	POF1	POF2
19	(The Gambia)	Ibou	1	1	1	1	1					2	1	3		1				1		1	1	1						1							2				
8	(Nigeria)	Chuka											3			1									1			1			1			1							
8	(Belgium)	Karel Geraerts	1			1				1					1						1			1		1			1												
5	(Cameroon)	Christian Pouga						1				2				1			1																						
2	(Belgium)	Alessandro Cerigioni																																1			1				
2	(Belgium)	Joren Dehond									1																							1							
2	(Iceland)	Stefán Gíslason										1			1																										
2	(Belgium)	Evariste Ngolok				1																																			1
2	(Belgium)	Bjorn Ruytinx																																					1	1	
1	(Belgium)	Thomas Azevedo																								1															
1	(Zimbabwe)	Ovidy Karuru												1																											
1	(Croatia)	Tomislav Mikulić																																			1				
1	(Belgium)	Wim Raymaekers								1																															
1	(Brazil)	Robson																																			1				
1	(Belgium)	Kenneth Van Goethem													1																										
1	(Belgium)	Koen Weuts																													1										
1	Own Goal			1																																					

A goal was scored from a penalty kick

Source: Match reports in Competitive matches.

==== Penalties Taken ====
Date	Penalty Taker	Scored	Opponent	Competition	Opposing Goalkeeper
5 August 2012	(The Gambia) Ibou	Yes	at home vs. Genk	Belgian Pro League	(Hungary) László Köteles
18 August 2012	(The Gambia) Ibou	Yes	at home vs. Cercle Brugge	Belgian Pro League	(Belgium) Bram Verbist
29 September 2012	(The Gambia) Ibou	No	at home vs. Waasland-Beveren	Belgian Pro League	(Belgium) Michaël Clepkens
20 October 2012	(The Gambia) Ibou	Yes	at home vs. Club Brugge	Belgian Pro League	(Serbia) Bojan Jorgačević
31 October 2012	(The Gambia) Ibou	No	at home vs. Mechelen	Belgian Pro League	(North Macedonia) Tomislav Pačovski
31 October 2012	(The Gambia) Ibou	Yes	at home vs. Mechelen	Belgian Pro League	(North Macedonia) Tomislav Pačovski
25 November 2012	(The Gambia) Ibou	Yes	away to Genk	Belgian Pro League	(Belgium) Kristof Van Hout
8 December 2012	(The Gambia) Ibou	Yes	away to Cercle Brugge	Belgian Pro League	(Belgium) Jo Coppens
22 December 2012	(The Gambia) Ibou	Yes	at home vs. Lierse	Belgian Pro League	(Belgium) Matz Sels
20 April 2013	(The Gambia) Ibou	Yes	away to Mechelen	Belgian Pro League	(Belgium) Wouter Biebauw
27 April 2013	(The Gambia) Ibou	No	at home vs. Charleroi	Belgian Pro League	(Greece) Michalis Sifakis

=== Goals conceded ===
Includes all competitive matches. Sorted by shirt number.

Position	Nation	Number	Name	Belgian Pro League	Belgian Cup	Total	Minutes per goal
GK	(Belgium)	1	Yves Lenaerts	0	0	0	0
GK	(Belgium)	21	Dean Michiels	0	0	0	0
GK	(Belgium)	26	Logan Bailly	67	2	69	49.46
TOTALS				67	2	69	49.57

==== Penalties Conceded ====
Date	Penalty Taker	Scored	Opponent	Competition	OHL Goalkeeper
18 August 2012	(Ukraine) Oleg Iachtchouk	Yes	at home vs. Cercle Brugge	Belgian Pro League	(Belgium) Logan Bailly
29 September 2012	(Israel) Barak Badash	Yes	at home vs. Waasland-Beveren	Belgian Pro League	(Belgium) Logan Bailly
6 October 2012	(France) Harlem Gnohéré	No	away to Charleroi	Belgian Pro League	(Belgium) Logan Bailly
27 October 2012	(Argentina) Hernán Losada	Yes	away to Beerschot	Belgian Pro League	(Belgium) Logan Bailly
8 December 2012	(Iceland) Eiður Guðjohnsen	Yes	away to Cercle Brugge	Belgian Pro League	(Belgium) Logan Bailly
16 December 2012	(Democratic Republic of the Congo) Dieumerci Mbokani	Yes	away to Anderlecht	Belgian Pro League	(Belgium) Logan Bailly
22 December 2012	(Egypt) Mohamed El-Gabbas	Yes	at home vs. Lierse	Belgian Pro League	(Belgium) Logan Bailly
6 April 2013	(Belgium) David Pollet	Yes	away to Charleroi	Belgian Pro League	(Belgium) Logan Bailly

=== Disciplinary record ===
Includes all competitive matches. Players with 1 card or more included only.

Last updated on 30 November 2012

Pos.	Nat.	No.	Player	Belgian Pro League		Belgian Cup		Total	
Pos.	Nat.	No.	Player	Booked	Sent off (straight red)	Booked	Sent off (straight red)	Booked	Sent off (straight red)
DF	(Brazil)	3	Robson	4	0	0	0	4	0
DF	(Belgium)	4	Wim Raymaekers	3	0	0	0	3	0
MF	(Belgium)	5	Kenny Thompson	6	1	0	0	6	1
MF	(Belgium)	6	Kenneth Van Goethem	3	0	0	0	3	0
FW	(Cameroon)	9	Christian Pouga	3	0	0	0	3	0
FW	(The Gambia)	12	Ibou	3	0	0	0	3	0
MF	(Belgium)	14	Thomas Azevedo	1	0	0	0	1	0
DF	(Belgium)	17	Koen Weuts	2	0	0	0	2	0
DF	(Belgium)	18	Jonas De Roeck	7	0	0	0	7	0
FW	(Nigeria)	23	Chuka	4	0	0	0	4	0
DF	(Belgium)	24	Ludovic Buysens	2	0	0	1	2	1
MF	(Iceland)	27	Stefán Gíslason	4	0	0	0	4	0
DF	(Belgium)	32	Günther Vanaudenaerde	3	0	1	0	4	0
			TOTALS	45	1	1	1	46	2

=== Suspensions during the season ===
Includes suspensions for competitive matches.

Last updated on 13 April 2013

Date	Player/Coach	Reason	Punishment	Source
27 August 2012 (appeal 28 August 2012)	(Belgium) Ronny Van Geneugden	Stepped on pitch during match vs Anderlecht	One match suspension and 100 € fine, after appeal reduced to a suspended sentence	ohl.be
29 September 2012	(Belgium) Jonas De Roeck	5x (yellow card)	One match ban (away to Charleroi)	
20 October 2012	(Belgium) Kenny Thompson	(yellow card) (yellow-red card) at home vs Club Brugge	One match ban (away to Beerschot)	
1 December 2012	(Belgium) Kenny Thompson	5x (yellow card)	One match ban (away to Cercle Brugge)	
19 January 2013	(Brazil) Robson	5x (yellow card)	One match ban (away to Waasland-Beveren)	
26 January 2013	(Iceland) Stefán Gíslason	5x (yellow card)	One match ban (at home vs Charleroi)	
9 February 2013	(Belgium) Günther Vanaudenaerde	5x (yellow card)	One match ban (at home vs Beerschot)	
9 February 2013	(Belgium) Kenny Thompson	(red card) away to Club Brugge	Three match ban (at home vs Beerschot & Standard Liège and away to Mechelen)	
16 March 2013	(Croatia) Tomislav Mikulić	5x (yellow card)	One match ban (at home vs Waasland-Beveren)	
30 March 2013	(Belgium) Koen Weuts	(yellow card) (yellow-red card) at home vs Waasland-Beveren	One match ban (away to Charleroi)	

=== Severe injuries during the season ===
Last updated on 15 January 2013

Date	Player	Injury	Initial Estimated Return	In Full Training	First Match after Injury	Source
Pre-Season	(Belgium) Emmerik De Vriese	Underwent knee surgery	August 2012			ohl.be
27 June 2012	(Belgium) Bjorn Ruytinx	Torn anterior cruciate ligament during friendly match against Kampenhout	December 2012	January 2013	12 January 2013	
30 June 2012	(Belgium) Kenny Thompson	Meningitis	August 2012	Third week of August 2012	25 August 2012	
8 August 2012	(Belgium) Günther Vanaudenaerde	Torn muscle in his abdomen during match against Genk	September 2012	August 2012	1 September 2012	
31 October 2012	(Belgium) Wim Raymaekers	Suffered severe knee injury during match against Mechelen	March 2013			

=== Overall ===
Games played	23 (22 Belgian Pro League, 1 Belgian Cup)
Games won	6 (6 Belgian Pro League, 0 Belgian Cup)
Games drawn	10 (10 Belgian Pro League, 0 Belgian Cup)
Games lost	7 (6 Belgian Pro League, 1 Belgian Cup)
Goals scored	40
Goals conceded	36
Goal difference	+4
Clean sheets	2
Yellow cards	47
Red cards	2
Worst discipline	(Belgium) Jonas De Roeck, 7 yellow cards.
Best result(s)	W 0 – 4 (A) at Charleroi – Belgian Pro League – 6 October 2012
Worst result(s)	L 5 – 2 (A) at Mons – Belgian Pro League – 28 July 2012
Most appearances	3 players with 18 appearances
Top scorer	(The Gambia) Ibou, 16 goals

Last updated: 15 January 2013
Source: Competitions' Wikipedia articles.

== Club ==
=== Coaching staff ===
Position	Staff
Head coach	(Belgium) Ronny Van Geneugden
Assistant First Team Coach	(Netherlands) Arnold Rijsenburg
Assistant First Team Coach	(Belgium) Hans Vander Elst
Goalkeeping coach	(Belgium) Jurgen De Braekeleer

Last updated: 21 May 2012
Source: OHL.be

=== Other information ===
Owner/Chairman	(Belgium) Jan Callewaert
Ground (capacity and dimensions)	Den Dreef (9,000 / )

Updated to match played 21 May 2012
Source: OHL.be

== Competitions ==
Competition	Started round	Current position / round	Final position / round	First match	Last match
Belgian Pro League	—	—	10th & playoff final	28 July 2012	18 May 2013
Belgian Cup	6th Round	—	6th Round	26 September 2012	26 September 2012

Updated to match played 21 May 2012
Source: Competitions

=== Friendly matches ===
==== Pre-season ====
23 June 2012	Stormvogels Haasrode (Belgium)	0 – 5	(Belgium) Oud-Heverlee Leuven	Rudy Delangstadion, Blanden
16:00 CEST		(Report)	Azevedo 29' (pen.); Buysens 32'; Remacle 53' (pen.), 89'; Van Goethem 67'	Referee: Laurent Colemonts

27 June 2012	Kampenhout (Belgium)	0 – 2	(Belgium) Oud-Heverlee Leuven	De Zeype, Kampenhout
19:30 CEST		(Report)	Roelandts 50'; Azevedo 70'	Referee: David Smeets

30 June 2012	Bierbeek (Belgium)	0 – 3	(Belgium) Oud-Heverlee Leuven	Gemeentelijk Stadion, Bierbeek
19:30 CEST		(Report)	Chuka 73', 78'; Brogno 81'	Referee: Eddy De Haes

4 July 2012	Den Bosch (Netherlands)	1 – 2	(Belgium) Oud-Heverlee Leuven	Opleidings- en Trainingscomplex Den Bosch, 's-Hertogenbosch
19:00 CEST	Bilgin	(Report)	Gíslason; Weuts

5 July 2012	RKDVC (Netherlands)	Cancelled	(Belgium) Oud-Heverlee Leuven
19:00 CEST

8 July 2012	Olympia Wijgmaal (Belgium)	1 – 5	(Belgium) Oud-Heverlee Leuven	Wijgmaal stadion, Wijgmaal
16:00 CEST	Lifondja 13'	(Report)	Ibou 34'; Weuts 44'; Chuka 58', 60'; Steenwegen 64' (o.g.)	Referee: Roel Bensch

11 July 2012	Lierse (Belgium)	1 – 1	(Belgium) Oud-Heverlee Leuven	Mijnstadion, Beringen
19:30 CEST	Farag 30' (pen.)	(Report)	Gíslason 89'	Referee: Gert Deckers

15 July 2012	Antwerp (Belgium)	1 – 2	(Belgium) Oud-Heverlee Leuven	Bosuilstadion, Antwerp
18:00 CEST	Gombami 55'	(Report)	Gíslason 49'; Azevedo 89' (pen.)	Referee: Alten Cayir

18 July 2012	Oud-Heverlee Leuven (Belgium)	1 – 0	(Belgium) Lokeren	Den Dreef, Heverlee
19:30 CEST	Ibou 62'	(Report)		Referee: Maxime Borremans

21 July 2012	Oud-Heverlee Leuven (Belgium)	1 – 0	(Scotland) Hibernian	Den Dreef, Heverlee
19:00 CEST	Ibou 73'	(Report)		Referee: Roel Bensch

==== During the season ====
6 September 2012	Linden (Belgium)	0 – 6	(Belgium) Oud-Heverlee Leuven	Voetbalterrein VK Linden, Linden
18:30 CET		(Report)	Ngolok 5'; Brogno 25'; Bastiaens 61'; Chuka 64'; Dehond 80'; Claes 87'

7 January 2013	Vittoriosa Stars (Malta)	Cancelled	(Belgium) Oud-Heverlee Leuven

8 January 2013	Hibernians (Malta)	Cancelled	(Belgium) Oud-Heverlee Leuven

12 January 2013	Oud-Heverlee Leuven (Belgium)	1 – 0	(Netherlands) MVV Maastricht	Den Dreef, Heverlee
19:00 CEST	Gíslason

15 January 2013	Sterrebeek (Belgium)	Cancelled	(Belgium) Oud-Heverlee Leuven

=== Belgian Pro League ===
OHL's second season in the Belgian Pro League began on 28 July 2012.

==== Regular season ====
===== League table =====
Pos	Team	Pld	W	D	L	GF	GA	GD	Pts	Qualification
8	Mechelen	30	12	5	13	44	42	+2	41	Qualification for the Europa League play-offs
9	Kortrijk	30	11	6	13	31	30	+1	39	Qualification for the Europa League play-offs
10	OH Leuven	30	8	12	10	46	51	−5	36	Qualification for the Europa League play-offs
11	Charleroi	30	10	4	16	30	49	−19	34	Qualification for the Europa League play-offs
12	Gent	30	8	10	12	33	40	−7	34	Qualification for the Europa League play-offs

Source: Belgian Pro League
Rules for classification: 1) points; 2) number of matches won; if teams are still tied a playoff is organised.

===== Results summary =====
Overall								Home						Away					
Pld	W	D	L	GF	GA	GD	Pts	W	D	L	GF	GA	GD	W	D	L	GF	GA	GD
30	8	12	10	46	51	−5	36	5	6	4	26	27	−1	3	6	6	20	24	−4

Last updated: 16 March 2013.

===== Points breakdown =====
Points at home: 21
Points away from home: 15
Points against 2011/12 Playoff 1 teams (6): 10 (27.78%)
Points against 2011/12 Playoff 2 teams (7): 17 (40.48%)
Points against newly promoted teams (2): 9 (75%)

6 points: Charleroi, Mechelen
4 points: Beerschot, Cercle Brugge
3 points: Club Brugge, Waasland-Beveren
2 points: Genk, Gent, Kortrijk, Lierse
1 point: Anderlecht, Lokeren
0 points: Mons, Standard Liège, Zulte Waregem

===== Biggest & smallest =====
Biggest home win: 5–2 vs. Waasland-Beveren; 4–1 vs. Club Brugge
Biggest home defeat: 2–6 vs. Lokeren
Biggest away win: 0–4 vs. Charleroi
Biggest away defeat: 5–2 vs. Mons

Biggest home attendance: 9,599 vs. Club Brugge, vs. Mechelen and vs. Standard Liège
Smallest home attendance: 6,746 vs. Cercle Brugge
Biggest away attendance: 23,800 vs. Club Brugge
Smallest away attendance: 3,500 vs. Mons

===== Results by round =====
Round	1	2	3	4	5	6	7	8	9	10	11	12	13	14	15	16	17	18	19	20	21	22	23	24	25	26	27	28	29	30
Ground	A	H	A	H	H	A	H	A	H	A	H	A	H	A	H	H	A	H	A	A	H	A	H	A	H	A	H	A	H	A
Result	L	D	D	W	D	D	L	D	W	W	W	W	W	L	D	L	D	D	D	L	D	L	L	L	W	L	D	W	L	D
Position	16	14	13	10	10	12	14	13	11	8	6	6	3	6	6	8	8	9	9	9	9	10	10	10	10	10	10	10	10	10

Updated to match(es) played on 16 March 2013. Source:
A = Away; H = Home; W = Win; D = Draw; L = Loss

==== Playoffs ====
After finishing 10th during the regular season, OHL was placed in Group B of the Europa League Playoff together with Mechelen, Charleroi and Waasland-Beveren.

===== Table =====
Pos	Team	Pld	W	D	L	GF	GA	GD	Pts
1	OH Leuven (A)	6	3	1	2	9	8	+1	10
2	Mechelen	6	3	1	2	8	7	+1	10
3	Charleroi	6	1	4	1	5	3	+2	7
4	Waasland-Beveren	6	1	2	3	3	7	−4	5

(A) Advanced to the Final

By winning playoff Group B, OHL qualified for the playoff final against Group A winners Gent. This two legged final was lost on aggregate 8–2, ending the season for OHL.

==== Matches ====
28 July 2012 Matchday 1	Mons	5 – 2	Oud-Heverlee Leuven	Stade Charles Tondreau, Mons
20:00 CEST	Matumona 14'; Timmermans 24'; Franquart 28'; Nong (yellow card) 35'; Nicaise (yellow card) 43'; Jarju 77'; Nong 80'	Report	Geraerts 15'; Ibou 25'; Raymaekers (yellow card) 35'; Chuka (yellow card) 51'; De Roeck (yellow card) 69'; Vanaudenaerde (yellow card) 84'	Attendance: 3,500; Referee: Peter Vervecken

5 August 2012 Matchday 2	Oud-Heverlee Leuven	2 – 2	Genk	Den Dreef, Heverlee
18:00 CEST	Ibou (yellow card) 64'; Tshimanga 77' (o.g.); Ibou 84' (pen.)	Report	Hyland (red card) 36'; Vossen (yellow card) 37'; Benteke 44'; Gorius (yellow card) 45'; Buffel 71'; Croux (yellow card) 90+2'	Attendance: 7,082; Referee: Alexandre Boucaut

12 August 2012 Matchday 3	Gent	1 – 1	Oud-Heverlee Leuven	Jules Ottenstadion, Ghent
18:00 CEST	Wallace 26' van der Bruggen (yellow card) 55'; Conté (yellow card) 80'; Arbeitman (yellow card) 82'	Report	Ibou 1'; Weuts (yellow card) 53'; Van Goethem (yellow card) 63'	Attendance: 9,566; Referee: Laurent Colemonts

18 August 2012 Matchday 4	Oud-Heverlee Leuven	3 – 2	Cercle Brugge	Den Dreef, Heverlee
20:00 CEST	Ngolok 38'; Ibou 64' (pen.); Geraerts 82'	Report	Iachtchouk 27' (pen.); Van Eenoo (yellow card) 52'; Rudy 61'; Wils (yellow card) 90+3'	Attendance: 6,746; Referee: Jérôme Efong Nzolo

25 August 2012 Matchday 5	Oud-Heverlee Leuven	1 – 1	Anderlecht	Den Dreef, Heverlee
18:00 CEST	Ibou 32'; Ibou (yellow card) 32'; Chuka (yellow card) 51'; De Roeck (yellow card) 62'	Report	Iakovenko 11'	Attendance: 8,931; Referee: Serge Gumienny

1 September 2012 Matchday 6	Lierse	1 – 1	Oud-Heverlee Leuven	Herman Vanderpoortenstadion, Lier
20:00 CEST	Hazurov 45+1'	Report	Raymaekers (yellow card) 26'; Vanaudenaerde (yellow card) 71'; Azevedo (yellow card) 75'; De Roeck (yellow card) 82'; Buysens (yellow card) 84'; Pouga 90+4'; Pouga (yellow card) 90+5'	Attendance: 6,735; Referee: Claude Bourdouxhe

15 September 2012 Matchday 7	Oud-Heverlee Leuven	0 – 1	Zulte Waregem	Den Dreef, Heverlee
20:00 CEST	Ibou (yellow card) 19'; Thompson (yellow card) 34'; De Roeck (yellow card) 35'; Pouga (yellow card) 90+4'	Report	Malanda (yellow card) 41'; Vandenbroucke (yellow card) 55'; De Jonghe (yellow card) 71'; Naessens 85'	Attendance: 6,937; Referee: Alexandre Boucaut

22 September 2012 Matchday 8	Lokeren	2 – 2	Oud-Heverlee Leuven	Daknamstadion, Lokeren
20:00 CEST	Mokulu 59'; Mil. Marić 82'; Galitsios (yellow card) 86'	Report	Thompson (yellow card) 37'; Gíslason (yellow card) 55'; Raymaekers 65'; Geraerts 88'; Raymaekers (yellow card) 90+1'	Attendance: 5,588; Referee: Nicolas Laforge

29 September 2012 Matchday 9	Oud-Heverlee Leuven	5 – 2	Waasland-Beveren	Den Dreef, Heverlee
20:00 CEST	Pouga 39', 71'; Thompson (yellow card) 51'; Van Goethem (yellow card) 58'; Gíslason 61'; De Roeck (yellow card) 65'; Chuka (yellow card) 83'; Ibou 90', 90+4'	Report	Lepoint 54'; Da Silva (yellow card) 55'; Lardenoit (yellow card) 59'; Belhocine (yellow card) 60'; Badash 67' (pen.)	Attendance: 7,126; Referee: Sébastien Delferiere

6 October 2012 Matchday 10	Charleroi	0 – 4	Oud-Heverlee Leuven	Stade du Pays de Charleroi, Charleroi
20:00 CEST	Džinić (yellow card) 37'	Report	Chuka 3', 71', 85'; Gíslason (yellow card) 64'; Ibou 65'	Attendance: 5,027; Referee: Jurgen Brinckman

20 October 2012 Matchday 11	Oud-Heverlee Leuven	4 – 1	Club Brugge	Den Dreef, Heverlee
20:00 CEST	Ibou 12', 36', 80' (pen.); Robson (yellow card) 39'; Thompson (yellow card) 54' (yellow-red card) 69'; Karuru 82'	Report	Bacca 5'; Blondel (yellow card) 18'; Lestienne (yellow card) 39'; Bacca (yellow card) 57'; Almebäck (yellow card) 59'; Vázquez (yellow card) 59'; Almebäck (red card) 79'	Attendance: 9,500; Referee: Richard Liesveld

27 October 2012 Matchday 12	Beerschot	1 – 3	Oud-Heverlee Leuven	Olympisch Stadion, Antwerp
20:00 CEST	Losada 90' (pen.)	Report	Van Goethem (yellow card) 25' (goal) 56'; Geraerts 86'; Gíslason 88'	Attendance: 8,092; Referee: Carlos Manuel Alho-Guerreiro

31 October 2012 Matchday 13	Oud-Heverlee Leuven	3 – 1	Mechelen	Den Dreef, Heverlee
20:30 CET	Pouga 1'; Chuka 61'; Ibou 76' (pen.)	Report	Henkens (yellow card) 16'; Destorme 58'; Biset (yellow card) 62'	Attendance: 9,500; Referee: Tim Pots

4 November 2012 Matchday 14	Standard Liège	2 – 0	Oud-Heverlee Leuven	Stade Maurice Dufrasne, Liège
20:30 CET	Vainqueur 14'; Batshuayi 76'	Report	Weuts (yellow card) 28'; De Roeck (yellow card) 73'	Attendance: 18,238; Referee: Serdar Gözübüyük

10 November 2012 Matchday 15	Oud-Heverlee Leuven	0 – 0	Kortrijk	Den Dreef, Heverlee
20:00 CET	Pouga (yellow card) 33'; Thompson (yellow card) 55'; Gíslason (yellow card) 58'; De Roeck (yellow card) 69'	Report	Reynaud (yellow card) 55'; De Mets (yellow card) 67'; Pavlović (yellow card) 78'	Attendance: 7,621; Referee: Denis Vanbecelaere

17 November 2012 Matchday 16	Oud-Heverlee Leuven	1 – 3	Mons	Den Dreef, Heverlee
20:00 CET	Robson (yellow card) 36'; Gíslason (yellow card) 62'; Pouga 82'	Report	Perbet 2', 74', 90+2'; Debisschop (yellow card) 64'; Lépicier (yellow card) 67'; Angeli (yellow card) 85'	Attendance: 7,121; Referee: Johan Verbist

25 November 2012 Matchday 17	Genk	1 – 1	Oud-Heverlee Leuven	Cristal Arena, Genk
20:30 CET	Plet 22' (yellow card) 90+3'; Koulibaly (yellow card) 90+3'	Report	Van Goethem (yellow card) 71'; Ibou 90+3' (pen.)	Attendance: 19,761; Referee: Christophe Delacour

1 December 2012 Matchday 18	Oud-Heverlee Leuven	1 – 1	Gent	Den Dreef, Heverlee
20:00 CET	Geraerts 9'; Chuka (yellow card) 29'; Thompson (yellow card) 45+1'	Report	N'Diaye 7'; Melli (yellow card) 29' van der Bruggen (yellow card) 45+2'	Attendance: 8,360; Referee: Laurent Colemonts

8 December 2012 Matchday 19	Cercle Brugge	1 – 1	Oud-Heverlee Leuven	Jan Breydel Stadium, Bruges
20:00 CET	Verbist (red card) 36'; Evens (yellow card) 45+1'; Guðjohnsen 45+1' (pen.)	Report	Ibou 43' (pen.); Robson (yellow card) 45+1'	Attendance: 6,499; Referee: Carlos Manuel Alho-Guerreiro

16 December 2012 Matchday 20	Anderlecht	2 – 1	Oud-Heverlee Leuven	Constant Vanden Stock Stadium, Anderlecht
18:00 CET	Nuytinck (yellow card) 14'; Mbokani 27' (pen.), 51'; Kouyaté (yellow card) 54'; Mbokani (yellow card) 75'	Report	Robson (yellow card) 18'; Ibou 43'	Attendance: 20,000; Referee: Jérôme Efong Nzolo

22 December 2012 Matchday 21	Oud-Heverlee Leuven	2 – 2	Lierse	Den Dreef, Heverlee
20:00 CET	Vanaudenaerde (yellow card) 61'; Ibou 62' (pen.); Thompson (yellow card) 72'; Geraerts 77'	Report	Hazurov 20'; El-Gabbas (yellow card) 63'; El-Gabbas 73' (pen.)	Attendance: 8,325; Referee: Nicolas Laforge

26 December 2012 Matchday 22	Zulte Waregem	2 – 1	Oud-Heverlee Leuven	Regenboogstadion, Waregem
14:30 CET	Habibou 70', 90'; Habibou (yellow card) 89'	Report	Buysens (yellow card) 74'; Chuka 82'	Attendance: 7,000; Referee: Tim Pots

19 January 2013 Matchday 23	Oud-Heverlee Leuven	2 – 6	Lokeren	Den Dreef, Heverlee
20:00 CET	Azevedo 52'; Geraerts 64'; Robson (yellow card) 78'; Ruytinx (yellow card) 90+2'	Report	Mokulu 5', 34', 80'; Marić (yellow card) 38'; Leko 72'; Galitsios (yellow card) 77'; Lazić (yellow card) 78'; Persoons 83'; Patosi 90+3'	Attendance: 7,595; Referee: Laurent Colemonts

26 January 2013 Matchday 24	Waasland-Beveren	2 – 0	Oud-Heverlee Leuven	Freethiel Stadion, Beveren
20:00 CET	Blondelle (yellow card) 21' (yellow-red card) 56'; Badash 73'; D'Ulivo (yellow card) 81'; De Smet 83'	Report	Gíslason (yellow card) 40'; Ruytinx (yellow card) 90+2'	Attendance: 5,000; Referee: Carlos Alho-Guerreiro

2 February 2013 Matchday 25	Oud-Heverlee Leuven	1 – 0	Charleroi	Den Dreef, Heverlee
20:00 CET	Vanaudenaerde (yellow card) 41'; Chuka 55'; Ngolok (yellow card) 90'	Report	Kumedor (yellow card) 71'; Martos (yellow card) 86'	Attendance: 7,633; Referee: Peter Vervecken

9 February 2013 Matchday 26	Club Brugge	3 – 1	Oud-Heverlee Leuven	Jan Breydel Stadium, Bruges
20:00 CET	Lestienne 63'; Refaelov 66'; Bacca (yellow card) 74'; Larsen (red card) 78'; Tričkovski 84'	Report	Geraerts 50'; Thompson (red card) 61'; Vanaudenaerde (yellow card) 66'; Mikulić (yellow card) 69'; Ngolok (yellow card) 69'	Attendance: 23,800; Referee: Jonathan Lardot

16 February 2013 Matchday 27	Oud-Heverlee Leuven	1 – 1	Beerschot	Den Dreef, Heverlee
20:00 CET	Ibou 50'	Report	Losada (yellow card) 45'; Van Acker (yellow card) 49'; Stijnen (red card) 73'; Ogunjimi (yellow card) 74'; Raman 80'	Attendance: 8,416; Referee: Bart Vertenten

23 February 2013 Matchday 28	Mechelen	1 – 2	Oud-Heverlee Leuven	Argosstadion Achter de Kazerne, Mechelen
20:00 CET	de Witte 37'; Cordaro (yellow card) 42'; Destorme (yellow card) 67'	Report	Robson (yellow card) 55'; Weuts 68'; Ngolok (yellow card) 70'; Chuka 78'	Attendance: 10,106; Referee: Jurgen Brinckman

9 March 2013 Matchday 29	Oud-Heverlee Leuven	0 – 4	Standard Liège	Den Dreef, Heverlee
20:00 CET	Gíslason (yellow card) 31'; Mikulić (yellow card) 69'; Vanaudenaerde (yellow card) 77'	Report	Ezekiel 1'; Batshuayi 22'; Van Damme (red card) 45+3'; Ciman 69'; Bulot 83'	Attendance: 9,000; Referee: Alexandre Boucaut

16 March 2013 Matchday 30	Kortrijk	0 – 0	Oud-Heverlee Leuven	Guldensporen Stadion, Kortrijk
20:00 CET	N'Diaye (yellow card) 33'	Report	Yagan (yellow card) 70'; Van Goethem (yellow card) 73'; Mikulić (yellow card) 83'	Attendance: 6,849; Referee: Claude Bourdouxhe

31 March 2013 Playoff Matchday 1	Oud-Heverlee Leuven	3 – 1	Waasland-Beveren	Den Dreef, Heverlee
20:00 CET	Cerigioni 28'; Ogbu 52'; Robson (yellow card) 70'; Dehond 75'; Ruytinx (yellow card) 80'; Weuts (yellow card) 15' (yellow-red card) 83'	Report	Belhocine (yellow card) 46'; Blondelle (yellow card) 49'; De Smet (yellow card) 71'; De Smet 90+2'	Attendance: 7,392; Referee: Laurent Colemonts

6 April 2013 Playoff Matchday 2	Charleroi	3 – 0	Oud-Heverlee Leuven	Stade du Pays de Charleroi, Charleroi
20:00 CEST	Pollet 22' (pen.); Kaya 26'; Satli (yellow card) 43'; Mandanda (yellow card) 78'; Džinić 90+1'	Report	Robson (yellow card) 22'; Buysens (yellow card) 55'; Ruytinx (yellow card) 80'	Attendance: 5,134; Referee: Wim Smet

13 April 2013 Playoff Matchday 3	Oud-Heverlee Leuven	0 – 3	Mechelen	Den Dreef, Heverlee
20:00 CEST	Ruytinx (yellow card) 71'	Report	Van Damme 41'; Pedersen 45'; Pandža (yellow card) 53'; Diabang 87'	Attendance: 9,282; Referee: Tim Pots

20 April 2013 Playoff Matchday 4	Mechelen	1 – 5	Oud-Heverlee Leuven	Argosstadion Achter de Kazerne, Mechelen
20:00 CEST	de Witte 40'; Van Damme (yellow card) 54' (yellow-red card) 62'	Report	Robson (yellow card) 26'; Weuts (yellow card) 41'; Mikulić 56'; Ibou 63' (pen.); Robson 68'; Cerigioni 70'; Vanaudenaerde (yellow card) 72'; Mikulić (yellow card) 74'; Gíslason (red card) 75'; Ibou 83'	Attendance: 9,512; Referee: (Netherlands) Jochem Kamphuis

27 April 2013 Playoff Matchday 5	Oud-Heverlee Leuven	0 – 0	Charleroi	Den Dreef, Heverlee
20:00 CEST	Vanaudenaerde (yellow card) 40'	Report	François (yellow card) 72'; N'Ganga (yellow card) 55'; Martos (yellow card) 90'	Attendance: 9,234; Referee: Christophe Delacour

6 May 2013 Playoff Matchday 6	Waasland-Beveren	0 – 1	Oud-Heverlee Leuven	Freethiel Stadion, Beveren
20:00 CEST	D'Ulivo (red card) 38'; Belhocine (yellow card) 90+1'	Report	Ruytinx 73'; Ruytinx (yellow card) 90'; Ngolok (yellow card) 90+1'; Mikulić (yellow card) 90+1'	Attendance: 2,500; Referee: Frederik Geldhof

11 May 2013 Playoff Final Leg 1	Oud-Heverlee Leuven	1 – 4	Gent	Den Dreef, Heverlee
18:00 CEST	Ruytinx 3'; Bailly (yellow card) 63'; Robson (red card) 65'; Mikulić (yellow card) 90+3'	Report	Soumahoro 21'; Kage 35'; Hubert (yellow card) 51'; Van der Bruggen 61'; Kage (yellow card) 63'; Mboyo 83' (pen.)	Attendance: 6,580; Referee: Alexandre Boucaut

18 May 2013 Playoff Final Leg 2	Gent	4 – 1	Oud-Heverlee Leuven	Jules Ottenstadion, Ghent
20:00 CEST	López 6', 43'; Brüls 72'; Coulibaly 82'	Report	Ngolok 59'	Attendance: 6,190; Referee: Jérôme Efong Nzolo

=== Belgian Cup ===
26 September 2012 6th round	Oostende	2 – 1	Oud-Heverlee Leuven	Albertpark, Ostend
20:00 CET	Gendarme (yellow card) 27'; Van Steenbrugghe (yellow card) 39'; Luissint (yellow card) 49'; Dissa 70'; Vandamme 82'; Martens (yellow card) 89'; Brouckaert (yellow card) 89'	Report	Buysens (yellow card) 28' (yellow-red card) 36'; Karuru (yellow card) 34'; Vanaudenaerde (yellow card) 56'; Dehond 85'	Referee: Christoph Dierick
