= Van Geneugden =

Van Geneugden is a Dutch surname. Notable people with the surname include:

- Martin Van Geneugden (1932–2014), Belgian cyclist
- Ronny Van Geneugden (born 1968), Belgian footballer and manager
