= Frederik Boi =

Belgian footballer

Personal information
- Full name: Frederik Ingrid Rik Boi
- Date of birth: 25 October 1981 (age 45)
- Place of birth: Bruges, Belgium
- Height: 1.85 m (6 ft 1 in)
- Positions: Right wing; right back

Youth career
- 1989–2000: Cercle Brugge

Senior career*
Years	Team	Apps	(Gls)
2000–2011	Cercle Brugge	248	(28)
2011–2013	OH Leuven	28	(3)
2013	→ Cercle Brugge (loan)	12	(1)
2013–2015	Cercle Brugge	20	(2)
2015	KFC Izegem	13	(6)
2015–2017	Knokke	2	(1)
2017–2018	KSC Blankenberge		
- * Club domestic league appearances and goals as of 12 October 2015

Frederik Boi (born 25 October 1981) is a Belgian former professional football player who last played for KSC Blankenberge.

Until 2011, Boi had played his whole career for Cercle Brugge. Initially, his position on the field used to be wide midfielder or winger. However, starting from the 2007–08 season, Cercle coach Glen De Boeck fielded Boi as right wing back. Ever since, De Boeck has been calling Boi the best right wing back in the Belgian competition. Boi used to be a teammate of Belgian international Thomas Buffel during his youth schooling at Cercle.

It took quite a long time for Boi to definitively achieve a place in Cercle's starting line-up, mainly because of Boi's thin appearance during his era as a youth player. However, due to Cercle not playing at the highest level of Belgian football, Boi was eventually given an opportunity. As a result, when Cercle promoted to the highest level, Boi was physically ready to take up his responsibility as a professional footballer. Before becoming a professional player, Frederik Boi worked for the Belgian bookstore Standaard Boekhandel as a computer programmer.

Frederik Boi made himself immortal for the Cercle fans, scoring the only goal in the victory against city rivals Club Brugge on 17 December 2006. It was the first win in 13 years for Cercle in the Bruges derby. (Frederik Boi's famous goal on Youtube.com)

In 2011, Boi, regarded as a Cercle Brugge monument, transferred to the newly promoted First Division side OH Leuven, where he appeared frequently during his first season and scored two goals in a 3–1 win against Club Brugge. Halfway through the 2012–13 season, after requesting a transfer for not receiving much playing time, Boi was loaned out back to his former team for the remainder of the season and the transfer was made permanent following the end of the season, as Boi moved back to Cercle on a permanent basis during the summer 2013 transfer window, when he signed a two-year contract with Cercle, tying him until 2015. During the first half of the 2014–15 season, Boi did not play a single minute for Cercle and as a result he chose to leave to Belgian Third Division team Izegem during the winter 2014–15 transfer window.
