= Niels Vandenbroucke =

Belgian footballer

Personal information
- Date of birth: 15 March 1991 (age 35)
- Place of birth: Belgium
- Height: 1.74 m (5 ft 8 1/2 in)
- Position: Defender

Team information
- Current team: Sparta Petegem

Youth career
- –2012: Zulte-Waregem

Senior career*
Years	Team	Apps	(Gls)
2012–2014	Zulte-Waregem	8	(0)
2014–2015	KFC Izegem	33	(1)
2015–	Sparta Petegem	19	(1)
- * Club domestic league appearances and goals as of 28 December 2015

Niels Vandenbroucke (born 15 March 1991) is a Belgian footballer who currently plays for Sparta Petegem.

== Career ==
Vandenbroucke made his debut for Zulte-Waregem on 14 April 2012 during the play-off game against K. Beerschot AC, where he was brought on the pitch 3 minutes before the end. Two weeks later, for the first time in his professional career he appeared in Zulte's starting squad against RAEC Mons.

== Playing career ==
season	club	country	competition	app.	goals
2011/12	SV Zulte Waregem	Belgium	Jupiler Pro League	4	0
2012/13	SV Zulte Waregem	Belgium	Jupiler Pro League	4	0
2013/14	SV Zulte Waregem	Belgium	Jupiler Pro League	0	0
			Total	8	0
