= Robson (footballer, born 1983) =

Brazilian footballer

Personal information
- Full name: Robson Severino da Silva
- Date of birth: 10 July 1983 (age 43)
- Place of birth: Recife, Brazil
- Height: 1.87 m (6 ft 2 in)
- Position: Centre back

Senior career*
Years	Team	Apps	(Gls)
2004	Itabaiana		
2005	Mogi Mirim	14	(0)
2006	Itabaiana	10	(0)
2006–2007	Gondomar	29	(0)
2007–2009	Vitória Setúbal	57	(2)
2009–2012	Marítimo	62	(0)
2012–2014	Oud-Heverlee Leuven	54	(2)
2014–2015	Waasland-Beveren	30	(3)
Total		256	(7)
- * Club domestic league appearances and goals

Robson Severino da Silva (born 10 July 1983), known simply as Robson, is a Brazilian former professional footballer who played as a central defender.

== Club career ==
Born in Recife, Pernambuco, Robson played lower league football in his early years. In June 2005 he signed a six-month contract with Mogi Mirim Esporte Clube of the third division, then joined Associação Olímpica de Itabaiana in the League of Sergipe state.

In the summer of 2006, Robson signed for Portuguese second level club Gondomar S.C. and, the following season, at the age of 24, made his Primeira Liga debut – in his country or abroad – with Vitória de Setúbal. His first game in the competition was on 19 August 2007, as he played the full 90 minutes in a 1–1 away draw against Vitória de Guimarães.

On 7 July 2009, after having helped the Sadinos consecutively retain their status and only missing a combined three matches, Robson stayed in the country, agreeing to a three-year deal with C.S. Marítimo after having arrived for free. He made an average of 20 league appearances during his spell in Madeira.

Again as a free agent, on 19 September 2012, Robson moved to Belgian First Division A side Oud-Heverlee Leuven. In the 2014 off-season, following his team's relegation to the second tier, he rejoined his former coach Ronny Van Geneugden at Waasland-Beveren.

== Honours ==
Vitória de Setúbal

- Taça da Liga: 2007–08
