= Ben Yagan =

Belgian-Armenian footballer

Personal information
- Date of birth: 9 May 1995 (age 31)
- Place of birth: Brussels, Belgium
- Height: 1.73 m (5 ft 8 in)
- Position: Attacking midfielder

Team information
- Current team: Saintoise

Youth career
- –2011: Diegem
- 2011–2012: OH Leuven

Senior career*
| Years | Team | Apps | (Gls) |
| 2012–2015 | OH Leuven | 28 | (1) |
| 2015–2016 | Heist | 20 | (5) |
| 2016–2017 | OH Leuven | 5 | (0) |
| 2017–2018 | Dessel Sport | 31 | (4) |
| 2018–2019 | Roeselare | 24 | (0) |
| 2019–2020 | Patro Eisden | 15 | (0) |
| 2020–2022 | Tienen | 20 | (0) |
| 2022–2023 | Eendracht Aalst | 13 | (0) |
| 2023–2026 | Crossing Schaerbeek | 64 | (15) |
| 2026– | Saintoise | | |
- * Club domestic league appearances and goals as of 28 June 2026

Ben Yagan (born 9 February 1995) is a Belgian-Armenian footballer who plays as a attacking midfielder for Saintoise in the Belgian Provincial Leagues.

== Club career ==
Yagan grew up as a youth in K. Diegem Sport. In Brussels, he was at the age of 16 when he transferred to the Oud-Heverlee Leuven youth team. Yagan was promoted from the youth squad of Oud-Heverlee Leuven to the first team at the beginning of the 2012–13 season and was allowed to play for the first time on 25 November 2012, when he was subbed on in injury time for Günther Vanaudenaerde in a 1–1 draw away to Genk.

Following the 2014–15 season, the contract of Yagan with OH Leuven ended and he was released. Near the end of October 2015, he signed as a free player for Heist.

== Personal ==
Yagan's older brother Ivan Yagan also plays professional football.
