= Wout Bastiaens =

Belgian footballer (born 1994)

Personal information
- Date of birth: 30 March 1994 (age 32)
- Place of birth: Belgium
- Position: Defender

Team information
- Current team: Punt-Larum

Youth career
- 2000–2011: Westerlo

Senior career*
| Years | Team | Apps | (Gls) |
| 2011–2012 | Westerlo | 1 | (0) |
| 2012–2014 | OH Leuven | 2 | (0) |
| 2014–2015 | Dessel Sport | 21 | (1) |
| 2015–2019 | Oosterzonen Oosterwijk | 6 | (0) |
| 2019 | → Vosselaar (loan) | 0 | (0) |
| 2019–2021 | Hasselt | 0 | (0) |
| 2021–2022 | Wezel Sport | 0 | (0) |
| 2022– | Punt-Larum | 0 | (0) |

International career
| | Belgium U15 | 3 | (1) |
| | Belgium U19 | 1 | (0) |
- * Club domestic league appearances and goals as of 30 October 2013

Wout Bastiaens (born 30 March 1994) is a Belgian footballer who currently plays for Punt-Larum in the Belgian Provincial Leagues.

Bastiaens played his first match at the highest level of Belgian football on 18 May 2013 for Oud-Heverlee Leuven, when he was part of the starting lineup in the 4–1 away loss to Gent.
