= Tomislav Mikulić =

Croatian footballer (born 1982)

Personal information
- Full name: Tomislav Mikulić
- Date of birth: 4 January 1982 (age 44)
- Place of birth: Vukovar, SR Croatia, SFR Yugoslavia
- Height: 1.86 m (6 ft 1 in)
- Position: Defender

Team information
- Current team: Bjelovar (manager)

Youth career
- Osijek

Senior career*
Years	Team	Apps	(Gls)
2001–2004	Osijek	87	(4)
2005–2007	Genk	68	(5)
2008	Dinamo Zagreb	10	(0)
2008–2010	Standard de Liège	21	(0)
2010–2012	Beerschot	90	(2)
2013	OH Leuven	13	(1)
2013–2014	Panthrakikos	8	(0)
2014	Cracovia	6	(0)
2015	Slaven Belupo	9	(0)
2016	Gorica	2	(0)
Total		314	(11)

International career
1998	Croatia U15	2	(0)
1999	Croatia U16	1	(0)
1998–2000	Croatia U17	8	(3)
2001	Croatia U19	1	(0)
2001	Croatia U20	2	(0)
2002–2004	Croatia U21	14	(0)

Managerial career
- 2024–: Bjelovar
- * Club domestic league appearances and goals

Tomislav Mikulić (born 4 January 1982) is a Croatian professional football manager and former player who played as a defender. He is currently in charge of Bjelovar.

== Club career ==
Mikulić started his career with Croatia's NK Osijek before moving to K.R.C. Genk in 2005. On 18 December 2007 he signed a 3 1/2-year deal with Dinamo Zagreb. He returned to Belgium in summer 2008 when he signed with Standard de Liège. In January 2013, he joined OH Leuven from Beerschot.

== International career ==
Mikulić has previously been a part of the Croatian national under-21 team, but has never been capped with the seniors.

== Honours ==
Dinamo Zagreb

- Croatian First Football League: 2007–08
- Croatian Football Cup: 2007–08

Standard Liège

- Belgian First Division A: 2008–09
- Belgian Super Cup: 2008, 2009
