= Xavier Luissint =

French footballer (born 1984)

Personal information
- Full name: Xavier Luissint
- Date of birth: 13 January 1984 (age 42)
- Place of birth: Paris, France
- Height: 1.75 m (5 ft 9 in)
- Position: Defender

Team information
- Current team: VW Hamme
- Number: 21

Youth career
- ES Vitry
- CFF de Paris
- Saint-Étienne

Senior career*
Years	Team	Apps	(Gls)
2001–2004	Saint-Étienne	0	(0)
2004–2005	AS Valence		
2005–2008	RC Épernay Champagne		
2008–2015	KV Oostende	197	(18)
2016–2017	Cercle Brugge	7	(1)
2017–	VW Hamme	6	(0)
- * Club domestic league appearances and goals as of 26 January 2018

Xavier Luissint (born 13 January 1984) is a French footballer who plays for VW Hamme.
