= Christopher Verbist =

Belgian footballer

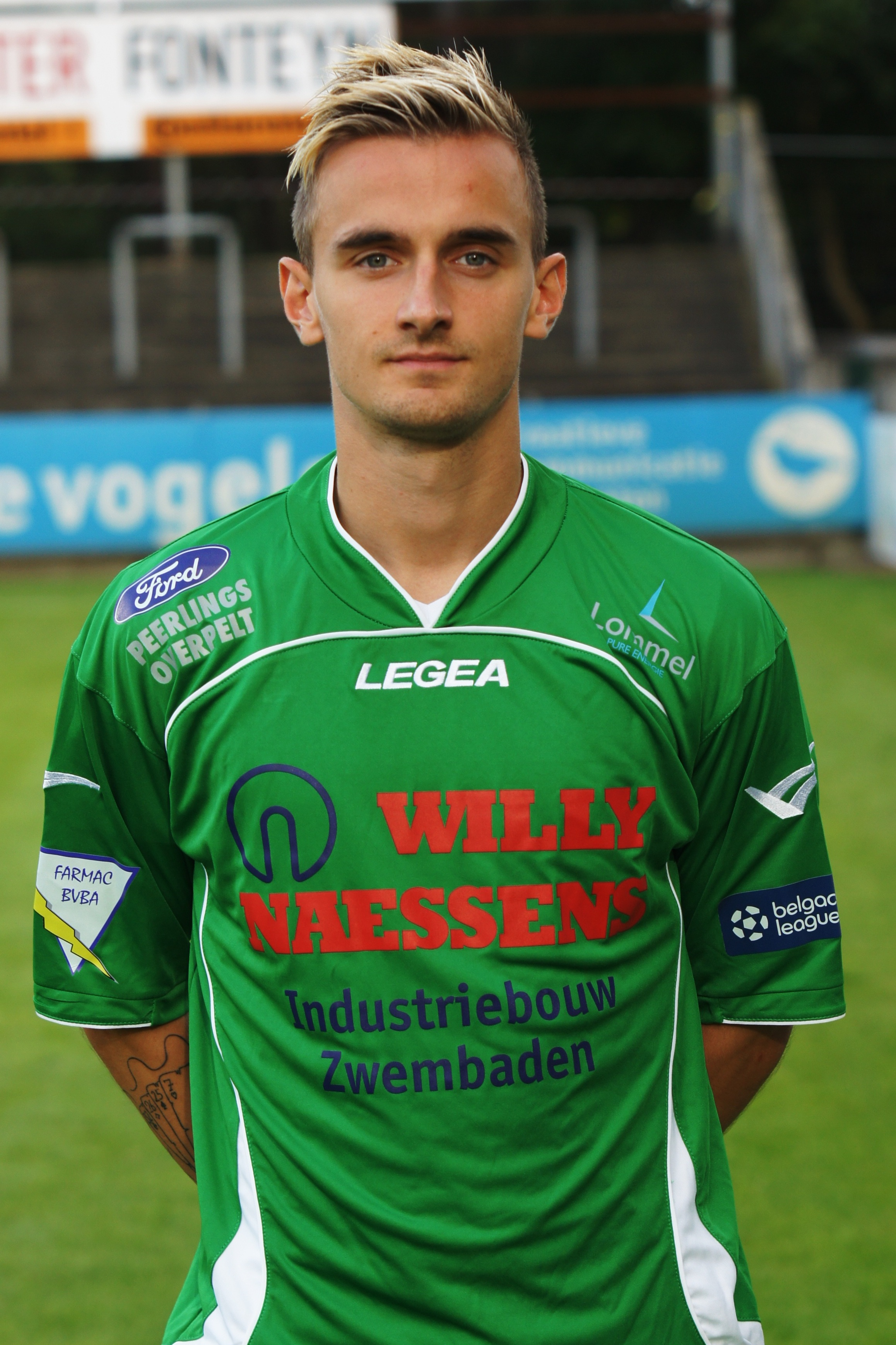

Personal information
- Full name: Christopher Verbist
- Date of birth: 8 October 1991 (age 35)
- Height: 1.76 m (5 ft 9 in)
- Position: Left winger

Youth career
- Standard Liège

Senior career*
Years	Team	Apps	(Gls)
2009–2011	Standard Liège	3	(0)
2011–2012	→ Charleroi (loan)	16	(2)
2012–2014	OH Leuven	1	(0)
2013–2014	→ Lommel United (loan)	25	(2)
2014–2015	RC Mechelen	18	(0)
2015–2020	FC Wiltz 71	25	(7)

International career
2009	Belgium U19	2	(0)
- * Club domestic league appearances and goals

Christopher Verbist (born 8 October 1991) is a Belgian former professional football player. His position on the field is on the Left, either as a winger or as a wingback.

== Career ==
In 2009, he played in two friendlies for the Belgium U19s.

Verbist played his first match in the Belgian Pro League with Standard Liège on the very last matchday of the 2009–10 season, but as he only got two appearances in the following season, he was loaned out to Belgian Second Division team Charleroi, where he played often. With Charleroi, he won the second division title, achieving promotion. However, as the loan ended, he was released by Standard, allowing him to sign with OH Leuven. During the 2012–13 season, Verbist only featured in two matches for OHL and as he was looking for more playing time, he was loaned out to second division team Lommel United for the 2013–14 season. The following season, he moved on permanent basis to RC Mechelen but was allowed to leave towards the end of 2014 as the team was having financial difficulties. In February 2015, he signed for FC Wiltz 71.
