= Simon Bracke =

Belgian footballer

Personal information
- Full name: Simon Bracke
- Date of birth: 17 November 1995 (age 30)
- Place of birth: Belgium
- Height: 1.83 m (6 ft 0 in)
- Position: Central midfielder

Youth career
- –2011: OH Leuven

Senior career*
Years	Team	Apps	(Gls)
2011–2017	OH Leuven	21	(1)
2015–2016	→ ASV Geel (loan)	25	(3)
2017–2022	Hasselt	53	(9)
2022–2023	Tienen	21	(0)
- * Club domestic league appearances and goals as of 27 February 2023 (UTC)

Simon Bracke (born 17 November 1995) is a retired Belgian footballer who last played for Tienen in the Belgian National Division 1.

Bracke made his debut for OH Leuven during the Belgian Second Division play-offs in 2014 against Eupen, a match which did not matter much as OH Leuven was already sure of relegation before the match. Bracke played 17 matches during the 2014–15 season, scoring once in the 3–0 home win against Racing Mechelen. OH Leuven promoted back in the Belgian Pro League at the end of that season and Bracke was deemed surplus and was therefore loaned for one season to ASV Geel where he played 25 matches, scoring three times. Bracke returned to OH Leuven for the 2016–17 season but was used infrequently and finally left after that season to play for Hasselt.
