= Joren Dehond =

Belgian footballer

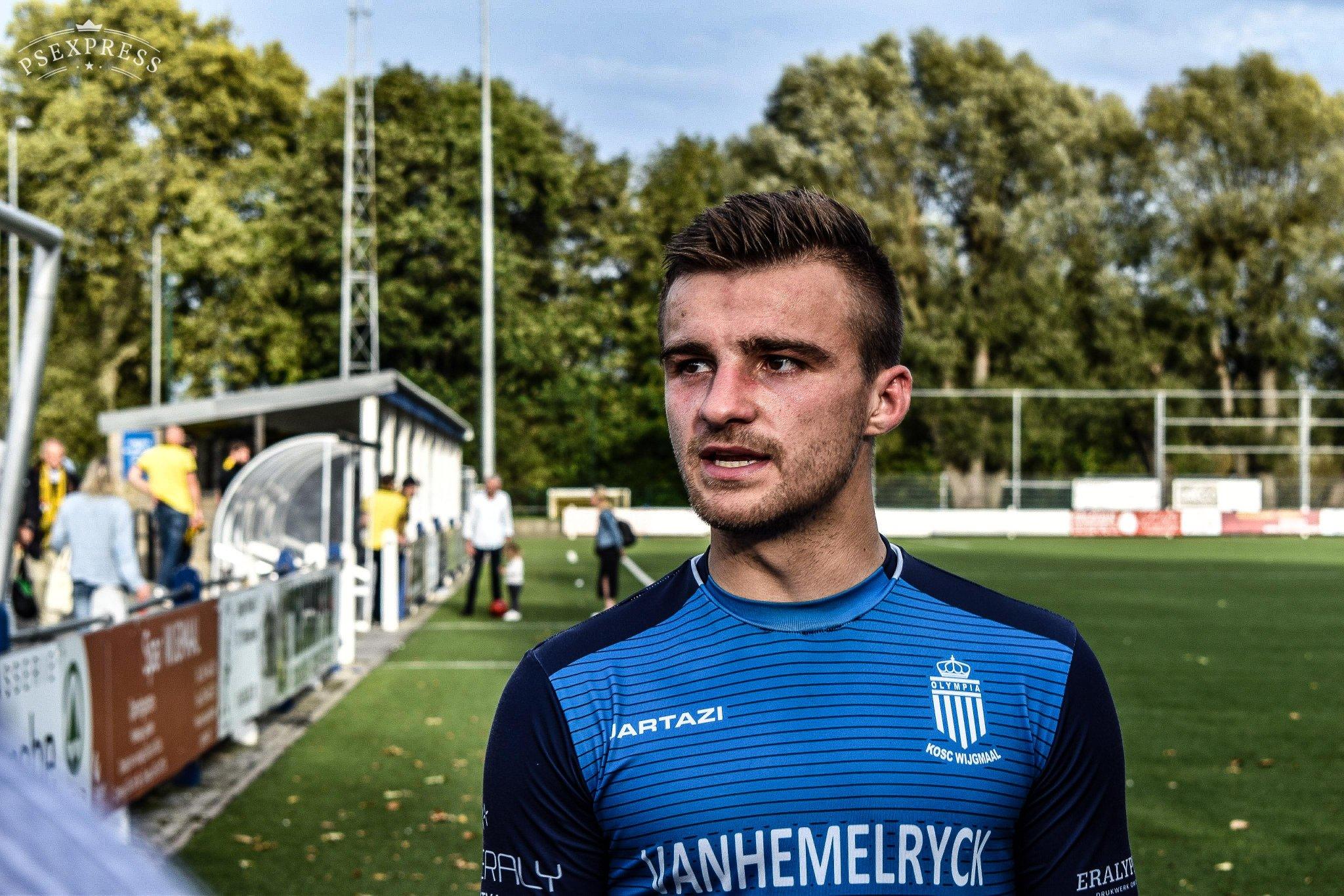

Personal information
- Date of birth: 8 August 1995 (age 31)
- Place of birth: Belgium
- Height: 1.69 m (5 ft 7 in)
- Position: Attacking midfielder

Team information
- Current team: Sportief Rotselaar
- Number: 10

Senior career*
Years	Team	Apps	(Gls)
2011–2014	OH Leuven	9	(1)
2014–2015	Woluwe-Zaventem	26	(2)
2015–2017	Oosterwijk	59	(9)
2017–2018	KVV Vosselaar		
2018–2020	Wijgmaal	40	(10)
2020–2024	Tempo Overijse	34	(5)
2024–2026	Sportief Rotselaar	59	(9)
2026–	KHO Bierbeek	0	(0)

International career
2011–2012	Belgium U17	9	(1)
2012–2013	Belgium U18	4	(2)
2013	Belgium U19	1	(0)
- * Club domestic league appearances and goals as of 26 January 2026

Joren Dehond (born 8 August 1995) is a Belgian professional footballer who plays as a midfielder for KHO Bierbeek in the Belgian Provincial Leagues.
