= Jonas De Roeck =

Belgian footballer (born 1979)

Personal information
- Date of birth: 20 December 1979 (age 46)
- Place of birth: Barcelona, Spain
- Height: 1.86 m (6 ft 1 in)
- Position: Defender

Youth career
- 1986–1987: Rochus Deurne
- 1987–1991: Park Sharon Tornados
- 1991–1992: Cobham
- 1992–1999: Antwerp

Senior career*
Years	Team	Apps	(Gls)
1999–2001	Antwerp	31	(1)
2001–2005	Lierse	103	(8)
2005–2007	Germinal Beerschot	40	(4)
2007–2009	Gent	43	(1)
2009–2012	FC Augsburg	43	(1)
2012–2013	Oud-Heverlee Leuven	15	(0)
2013–2015	Antwerp	44	(1)
Total		319	(16)

International career
2000–2002	Belgium U21	12	(1)

Managerial career
- 2015–2016: Lyra
- 2016–2017: Berchem
- 2017–2018: Sint-Truiden
- 2018–2019: Anderlecht (U21)
- 2018–2021: Anderlecht (assistant)
- 2021–2023: Westerlo
- 2024–2025: Antwerp
- * Club domestic league appearances and goals

Jonas De Roeck (born 20 December 1979) is a Belgian professional football coach and former player.

== Early life ==
De Roeck was born in Barcelona, Spain, where his father was working as a chemical engineer at the time. As a child he also lived in the United States and England.

== Playing career ==
De Roeck started his professional career with Antwerp in 1999 and spent several seasons with other Belgian clubs such as Lierse, Germinal Beerschot and Gent before moving to Germany with FC Augsburg. He returned in the summer of 2012 when he signed with Oud-Heverlee Leuven, where he stayed for one season before moving back to Antwerp.

== Managerial career ==
On 27 May 2021, De Roeck was officially announced as the new head coach of Belgian First Division B club Westerlo. He became the successor of Bob Peeters, who had not managed to lead the club to promotion to the top division in the four previous seasons. Westerlo earned promotion to the Belgian First Division A in his first season at the helm. After the 2021-22 season, De Roeck signed a contract extension to keep him at the club through the 2024-25 season.

== Managerial statistics ==
As of match played 1 March 2025

Managerial record by team and tenure
Team	From	To	Record				
Team	From	To	G	W	D	L	Win %
Sint-Truidense	14 August 2017	30 June 2018	39	13	12	14	33.33
Anderlecht (caretaker)	3 October 2019	13 October 2019	1	1	0	0	100.00
Westerlo	1 July 2021	2 December 2023	90	37	20	33	41.11
Royal Antwerp	1 July 2024	3 March 2025	33	14	11	8	42.42
Total			163	65	43	55	39.88
