= Ludovic Buysens =

Belgian footballer

Personal information
- Full name: Ludovic Buysens
- Date of birth: 13 March 1986 (age 40)
- Place of birth: Kluisbergen, Belgium
- Height: 1.87 m (6 ft 1 1/2 in)
- Positions: Center back; right back

Team information
- Current team: Olsa Brakel

Youth career
- 1991–1993: KFC Ruien
- 1993–2004: SV Waregem
- 2004–2005: Gent

Senior career*
Years	Team	Apps	(Gls)
2004–2006	Gent	3	(0)
2006	→ Aalst (loan)	14	(2)
2006–2007	Ronse	29	(1)
2007–2008	Deinze	34	(4)
2008–2009	Mons	31	(1)
2009–2012	Sint-Truiden	67	(2)
2012–2014	OH Leuven	36	(0)
2014–2018	Lierse	72	(4)
2018–2020	Dender EH	33	(1)
2020–	Olsa Brakel		
- * Club domestic league appearances and goals as of 00:02, 27 September 2019 (UTC)

Ludovic Buysens (born 13 March 1986) is a Belgian footballer who is currently playing for Olsa Brakel in the Belgian Third Amateur Division.
