= Yves Lenaerts =

Belgian footballer

Personal information
- Date of birth: 27 February 1983 (age 43)
- Place of birth: Turnhout, Belgium
- Height: 1.84 m (6 ft 1/2 in)
- Position: Goalkeeper

Senior career*
Years	Team	Apps	(Gls)
2002–2004	PSV Eindhoven	3	(0)
2004–2006	Heusden-Zolder	23	(0)
2006–2010	Club Brugge	1	(0)
2010–2016	Oud-Heverlee Leuven	54	(0)
2016–2018	ASV Geel	43	(0)
- * Club domestic league appearances and goals as of 25 January 2018

Yves Lenaerts (born 27 February 1983 in Turnhout) is a retired Belgian football goalkeeper who last played for ASV Geel.

== Previous clubs ==
Turnhout (youth), PSV Eindhoven (2002–04), Heusden-Zolder (2004–06) Club Brugge.
