= Christian Pouga =

Cameroonian footballer (born 1986)

Personal information
- Date of birth: 19 June 1986 (age 40)
- Place of birth: Douala, Cameroon
- Height: 1.93 m (6 ft 4 in)
- Position: Striker

Team information
- Current team: SA Mamertins

Youth career
- Avenir Douala
- 2001–2003: Dalian Shide

Senior career*
Years	Team	Apps	(Gls)
2003–2004	Dalian Shide	20	(10)
2004–2006	Shanghai United	40	(21)
2006–2007	Zürich	9	(1)
2007	Aarau	10	(1)
2007–2008	Bellinzona	34	(18)
2008–2009	Sevilla B	17	(1)
2009–2010	Leixões	27	(7)
2010–2011	Vaslui	21	(3)
2011–2012	Marítimo	13	(2)
2012	OH Leuven	19	(5)
2013	Lierse	7	(0)
2013–2014	Ankaraspor	2	(0)
2014–2016	Boavista	9	(0)
2016	PS Kemi	0	(0)
2017	Al-Talaba	0	(0)
2017	Pembroke Athleta	2	(0)
2018–	SA Mamertins	0	(0)
Medal record
Vaslui
Third place	Liga I	2011
- * Club domestic league appearances and goals as of 13 June 2014

Christian Pouga (born 19 June 1986) is a Cameroonian professional footballer who plays as a striker for SA Mamertins in the Division d'Honneur in France.

== Career ==
=== Early years ===
Pouga started off his professional footballing career with Shanghai United F.C. of the Chinese first division.

Pouga then went to play his trade in Switzerland, he spent two successful years at FC Zürich and FC Aarau respectively.

It was when Pouga stepped down a division where he really shone, playing for AC Bellinzona of the Swiss second division, and in his first year with the club he helped the club gain promotion to the top flight of Swiss football by scoring 18 goals in 32 appearances.

=== Sevilla B ===
On 20 June 2008 Pouga was sold to Sevilla FC from AC Bellinzona for an undisclosed fee.

=== Leixões ===
On 18 July 2009, Pouga was loaned by Sevilla to Leixões SC, of the Portuguese League, for one year. Later on, the deal became permanent.

=== Vaslui ===
On 9 August 2010, Pouga signed with the Romanian club FC Vaslui for three years.

=== Marítimo ===
In June 2011, Pouga has started playing for CS Marítimo.

=== PS Kemi ===
On 14 July 2016, Pouga signed a two-year contract with PS Kemi, but left 2-weeks later for personal reasons.
