= Wim Raymaekers =

Belgian footballer

Personal information
- Date of birth: 4 April 1985 (age 41)
- Place of birth: Hasselt, Belgium
- Height: 1.86 m (6 ft 1 in)
- Position: Defender

Youth career
- 2003–2005: Genk

Senior career*
Years	Team	Apps	(Gls)
2005–2007	Den Bosch	49	(1)
2007–2009	KVSK United	41	(1)
2009–2010	RS Waasland	31	(1)
2010–2014	OH Leuven	50	(2)
2014–2015	Delhi Dynamos	8	(1)
2016–	KVV Zonhoven	0	(0)
- * Club domestic league appearances and goals as of 2 January 2016

Wim Raymaekers (born 4 April 1985) is a Belgian football player who last played as a professional for Delhi Dynamos. In 2016, he announced signing for amateur team KVV Zonhoven, playing in the Belgian Provincial leagues.

== Career ==
The defender began his career in the youth ranks of Genk. Raymaekers left Genk in 2005 to play with Dutch second division side Den Bosch, where he played several matches in the first team for two seasons, before moving back to Belgium and signing with second division team KVSK United. After two seasons he transferred to RS Waasland from the same division in 2009. Finally OH Leuven signed Raymaekers from Waasland in 2010. Raymaekers was one of the players guiding OH Leuven to the first division in the 2010-11 season and was part of the team also for the three seasons until they relegated again. In 2014, he joined Delhi Dynamos. On 25 October 2014 he scored his first goal for the club within 57 seconds off kick-off, a left-footed drive from the edge of the box to open the scoring, against Chennaiyin FC at the Jawaharlal Nehru Stadium, New Delhi.
