= Stefán Gíslason =

Icelandic footballer and manager (born 1980)

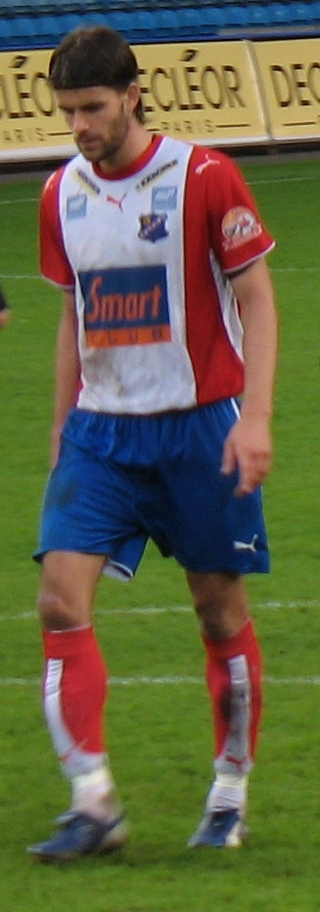

Personal information
- Date of birth: 15 March 1980 (age 46)
- Place of birth: Fjarðabyggð, Iceland
- Height: 1.96 m (6 ft 5 in)
- Position: Defensive midfielder

Team information
- Current team: Søgne (manager)

Youth career
- Umf. Austri
- –1997: Arsenal

Senior career*
Years	Team	Apps	(Gls)
1998	KR	12	(0)
1999–2001	Strømsgodset	65	(1)
2001–2003	Grazer AK	5	(0)
2003–2004	Keflavík	34	(3)
2005–2007	Lyn	62	(8)
2007–2011	Brøndby	70	(6)
2010	→ Viking (loan)	12	(1)
2011	Lillestrøm	15	(2)
2012–2014	OH Leuven	61	(4)
2014	Breiðablik	13	(1)

International career^{‡}
1994–1996	Iceland U-17	14	(2)
1995–1998	Iceland U-19	21	(2)
1999–2001	Iceland U-21	11	(0)
2002–2009	Iceland	32	(0)

Managerial career
- 2017: Haukar
- 2019: Leiknir Reykjavík
- 2019: Lommel
- 2021–2022: Søgne
- 2023–: Vindbjart
- * Club domestic league appearances and goals as of 22 March 2017 ‡ National team caps and goals as of 20 October 2026

Stefán Gíslason (born 15 March 1980) is an Icelandic retired footballer and manager who last played for Breiðablik in the Icelandic Premier League as a defensive midfielder. He is currently managing Vindbjart in the Norwegian Third Division.

As a player, Gíslason was renowned for coupling physical power with great technique and is the younger brother of fellow international player Valur Gíslason. In 2017, Gíslason starting his career as manager at Haukar, where he resigned at the end of the season.

== Club career ==
As a youngster he was on the roster of English giants Arsenal, but limited playing time saw him returning to KR Reykjavík on a loan deal. He later played for Strømsgodset, Grazer AK and Keflavík before joining Lyn in 2005. Stefán immediately made an impression, and was eventually made vice captain. While at Lyn he played 62 league games out of a possible 65, scoring eight goals.

He was sold to Brøndby in July 2007 and in February 2008 replaced Per Nielsen as captain. On 3 July 2009 Stefán was informed that he would no longer captain the side and that he would be free to leave the club at the end of the season. In recent time, Stefán has been linked to the Norwegian club Viking FK, were the former Norwegian national team coach Åge Hareide is coaching. He played on loan for Viking in early 2010.

His situation in Brøndby had not become better, resulting in Stefán wishing to leave the club in the next transfer season. On 4 February 2011, Brøndby and Stefán agreed to cancel his contract with the club with immediate effect. The timing of that release effectively leaves Stefán in limbo because other clubs are unable to sign him until the summer of 2011 due to the transfer window rules. Aberdeen manager Craig Brown stated on 21 February that he had been interested in signing Stefán until it was discovered he was ineligible to sign. On 16 March 2011, Stefán was presented as the main event at the seasonal kick-off of Lillestrøm SK, signing a contract expiring on 1 August. However, after enduring a terrible run of five goalless losses, Lillestrøm decided to bring him back 29 September for the remainder of the 2011 season. On 10 January 2012, he signed for Belgian team Oud-Heverlee Leuven.

In February 2014, Stefán signed a 3-year contract with Icelandic club Breiðablik. However, on 13 February 2015, he announced his retirement from professional football.

== Managerial career ==
In 2017, Stefán was appointed the manager of Haukar

== Career statistics ==
Season	Club	Division	League		Cup		Total	
Season	Club	Division	Apps	Goals	Apps	Goals	Apps	Goals
1998	KR	Úrvalsdeild	12	0	0	0	12	0
1999	Strømsgodset	Tippeligaen	18	0	0	0	18	0
2000	Strømsgodset	Adeccoligaen	25	0	0	0	25	0
2001	Strømsgodset	Tippeligaen	22	1	2	0	24	1
2001–02	Grazer AK	Bundesliga	3	0	0	0	3	0
2002–03	Grazer AK	Bundesliga	2	0	0	0	2	0
2003	Keflavík	1. deild karla	18	2	2	0	20	2
2004	Keflavík	Úrvalsdeild	16	2	3	0	19	2
2005	Lyn	Tippeligaen	25	1	3	1	28	2
2006	Lyn	Tippeligaen	25	3	1	0	26	3
2007	Lyn	Tippeligaen	12	4	3	3	15	7
2007–08	Brøndby	Superliga	29	5	0	0	29	5
2008–09	Brøndby	Superliga	29	1	0	0	29	1
2009–10	Brøndby	Superliga	12	0	0	0	12	0
2010	Viking	Tippeligaen	12	1	2	0	14	1
2011	Lillestrøm	Tippeligaen	15	2	2	0	17	2
2011–12	OH Leuven	Belgian Pro League	11	0	0	0	11	0
2012–13	OH Leuven	Belgian Pro League	25	2	0	0	25	2
2013–14	OH Leuven	Belgian Pro League	10	0	2	0	12	0
2014	Breiðablik	Úrvalsdeild	13	1	2	0	15	1
Career Total			336	25	20	4	356	29

== International career ==
Gíslason made his debut for Iceland in a January 2002 friendly match against Kuwait as a substitute for Helgi Sigurðsson. He has in total been capped 32 times for the Icelandic national team.
