= Cédric D'Ulivo =

French footballer (born 1989)

Personal information
- Date of birth: 29 August 1989 (age 37)
- Place of birth: Marseille, France
- Position: Defender

Team information
- Current team: Marseille Endoume

Senior career*
| Years | Team | Apps | (Gls) |
| 2009–2012 | Olympique de Marseille | 0 | (0) |
| 2009–2010 | → Cassis Carnoux (loan) | 12 | (0) |
| 2010–2011 | → AC Ajaccio (loan) | 4 | (0) |
| 2012–2015 | Waasland Beveren | 70 | (0) |
| 2015–2016 | Zulte Waregem | 6 | (0) |
| 2016–2017 | OH Leuven | 4 | (0) |
| 2017–2019 | FH | 21 | (1) |
| 2020–2024 | Marseille Endoume | 23 | (2) |
| 2024–2025 | EUGA Ardziv | 19 | (0) |
| 2025– | Marseille Endoume | | |
- * Club domestic league appearances and goals as of 3 August 2016

Cédric D'Ulivo (born 29 August 1989) is a French footballer who is currently playing for Marseille Endoume in the Régional 2 Méditerranée.
