= Koen Weuts =

Belgian footballer

Personal information
- Full name: Koen Weuts
- Date of birth: 18 September 1990 (age 36)
- Place of birth: Lier, Belgium
- Height: 1.86 m (6 ft 1 in)
- Positions: Centre-back; left back

Team information
- Current team: Lyra-Lierse
- Number: 17

Senior career*
| Years | Team | Apps | (Gls) |
| 2007–2009 | Lierse | 11 | (0) |
| 2009–2013 | OH Leuven | 72 | (2) |
| 2013–2015 | Helmond Sport | 50 | (4) |
| 2015–2018 | Lierse | 3 | (0) |
| 2019 | RWDM47 | 0 | (0) |
| 2019– | Lyra-Lierse | 128 | (5) |

International career
| 2007 | Belgium U17 | 6 | (0) |
| 2010 | Belgium U20 | 1 | (0) |
| 2011 | Belgium U21 | 1 | (0) |
- * Club domestic league appearances and goals as of 3 May 2026

Koen Weuts (born 18 September 1990) is a Belgian professional footballer who plays as a centre back for Belgian club Lyra-Lierse.

== Career ==
Before joining OH Leuven, Weuts played with youth teams of Lyra and Lierse. At only 16 years of age, he played his first official senior match for Lierse against Antwerp. In 2007, he was also part of the Belgium squad at the 2007 FIFA U-17 World Cup, together with players such as Eden Hazard and Christian Benteke. He moved to Oud-Heverlee Leuven in August 2009 and was part of the team that achieved promotion to the Belgian Pro League in 2011. In 2013, Weuts was released bu OHL and moved to Helmond Sport in the Eerste Divisie.

Koen's older brother Kurt Weuts is also a professional footballer and played together with him for Oud-Heverlee Leuven until 2011.
