= Mazin Ahmed Al-Huthayfi =

Saudi Arabian footballer

Personal information
- Date of birth: 2 February 1985 (age 41)
- Place of birth: Jeddah, Saudi Arabia
- Height: 1.82 m (5 ft 11 1/2 in)
- Position: Forward

Senior career*
Years	Team	Apps	(Gls)
2010–2013	Ittihad FC		(0)
2010	→ Staines Town (loan)		(0)
2010	→ Hampton & Richmond Borough (loan)		(0)
2010–2011	→ ZKS Zagórów (loan)	2	(1)
2011–2012	→ Portsmouth (loan)		(0)
2012	→ Fortuna Düsseldorf (loan)		(0)
2013	→ Oud-Heverlee Leuven (loan)	2	(0)
- * Club domestic league appearances and goals as of 18:45, 24 August 2012 (UTC)

Mazin Ahmed Al-Huthayfi (Arabic: مازن الحذيفي; born 29 July 1985) is a retired Saudi Arabian footballer. He last played for Oud-Heverlee Leuven in the Belgian Pro League.

Al-Huthayfi was previously loaned out by Ittihad FC to Staines Town, Hampton & Richmond Borough, Portsmouth, Fortuna Düsseldorf and Oud-Heverlee Leuven. He also had a long trial spell at FC Groningen in 2012.
