= Ebrahima Sawaneh =

Gambian footballer

Ibou
Personal information
- Full name: Ebrahima Sawaneh
- Date of birth: 7 September 1986 (age 40)
- Place of birth: Serekunda, The Gambia
- Height: 1.79 m (5 ft 10 in)
- Position: Forward

Team information
- Current team: Wilrijk

Youth career
- 1995–1997: BSC Frankfurt
- 1997–1998: SC Steinberg
- 1998–2002: SG Dietzenbach
- 2002–2004: SG Rosenhöhe

Senior career*
Years	Team	Apps	(Gls)
2004–2006	Lech Poznań	2	(0)
2006–2008	SK Beveren	39	(23)
2008–2012	KV Kortrijk	61	(8)
2011	→ KV Mechelen (loan)	11	(1)
2011–2012	→ Mons (loan)	36	(8)
2012–2014	OH Leuven	49	(21)
2013–2014	→ Muaither (loan)	10	(2)
2014–2016	Waasland-Beveren	34	(6)
2016–2017	Roeselare	37	(6)
2018	Tubize	7	(0)
2019	Titus Pétange	13	(7)
2019–2020	URSL Visé	22	(6)
2020–2021	Lokeren-Temse	3	(0)
2021–2023	City Pirates	46	(16)
2023–	Wilrijk		

International career
2008–2010	Gambia	5	(1)
- * Club domestic league appearances and goals as of 22:58, 6 September 2024 (UTC)

Ebrahima 'Ibou' Sawaneh (born 7 September 1986) is a Gambian professional footballer who plays as a forward for Wilrijk in the Belgian Provincial Leagues. In the past he played for various clubs, including Lech Poznan, KSK Beveren, KV Kortrijk, KV Mechelen, RAEC Mons, OH Leuven and Muaither. Sawaneh holds dual nationality (Gambian-German), and has represented the Gambia national team.

== Career ==
On 3 February 2014, Sawaneh returned to his parent club OH Leuven after a four-month loan spell in Qatar at Muaither.

In January 2019, Ibou joined Titus Pétange in Luxembourg on a half-year contract. He left the club at the end of his contract in July 2019, having played 13 league games and scored 7 goals.
