= Kenny Thompson =

Belgian footballer

Personal information
- Date of birth: 26 April 1985 (age 41)
- Place of birth: Deurne, Belgium
- Height: 1.82 m (6 ft 0 in)
- Position: Defender

Youth career
- Germinal Beerschot

Senior career*
Years	Team	Apps	(Gls)
2003–2005	Germinal Beerschot	8	(0)
2005–2010	Gent	74	(2)
2006–2007	→ Lierse (loan)	8	(0)
2007–2008	→ Roeselare (loan)	30	(5)
2011–2012	Lierse	28	(1)
2012–2015	OH Leuven	54	(0)
2015–2017	Beerschot Wilrijk		
2017–2018	Nijlen	10	
- * Club domestic league appearances and goals as of 29 December 2015

Kenny Thompson (born 26 April 1985) is a retired Belgian football player who last played for Nijlen in the Belgian Third Amateur Division.

== Honours ==
K.A.A. Gent

- Belgian Cup (1): 2009–10
