= Günther Vanaudenaerde =

Belgian footballer

Personal information
- Full name: Günther Vanaudenaerde
- Date of birth: 23 January 1984 (age 42)
- Place of birth: Knokke-Heist, Belgium
- Height: 1.79 m (5 ft 10 in)
- Position: Right back

Youth career
- FC Lissewege
- KSC Blankenberge
- –2001: Cercle Brugge
- 2001–2004: Club Brugge

Senior career*
Years	Team	Apps	(Gls)
2005–2006	Club Brugge	22	(0)
2006–2007	NEC	9	(0)
2007–2012	Westerlo	103	(2)
2012–2014	OH Leuven	32	(0)
2014–2015	Royal Antwerp	21	(0)
2015–2018	Sint-Eloois-Winkel	88	(6)
2019–2020	Torhout	28	(0)

International career
2001	Belgium U16	5	(0)
2001	Belgium U17	1	(0)
2001–2002	Belgium U18	7	(0)
2004–2006	Belgium U21	19	(0)
- * Club domestic league appearances and goals

Günther Vanaudenaerde (born 23 January 1984) is a Belgian former professional footballer who played as a right back.

== Football career ==
After playing youth football for FC Lissewege, KSC Blankenberge and Cercle Brugge, Vanaudenaerde made his debut in professional football as part of the Club Brugge squad in the 2005–06 season. Under manager Jan Ceulemans, he was given the opportunity to play several times, often due to injuries to regular right back Olivier De Cock. Emilio Ferrera, who replaced Ceulemans as head coach in April 2006, found Vanaudenaerde wanting and indicated at the beginning of the 2006–07 season that he was allowed to leave the club.

Vanaudenaerde then moved to NEC for a reported fee of €150,000 in July 2006. He received little playing time, and he returned to Belgium after only one season, where he signed a contract with Westerlo. After the club suffered relegation to the Belgian Second Division in 2012, Vanaudenaerde signed a two-year contract with OH Leuven. In the 2014–15 season, he played for Royal Antwerp, and since the summer of 2015 for Sint-Eloois-Winkel Sport, where he played until January 2019. After this, Vanaudenaerde left for Torhout, where he continued to play until January 2020, after which he ended he announced his retirement from football.

== Honours ==
Club Brugge

- Belgian Super Cup: 2005
