= Ronny Van Geneugden =

Belgian football coach and former player

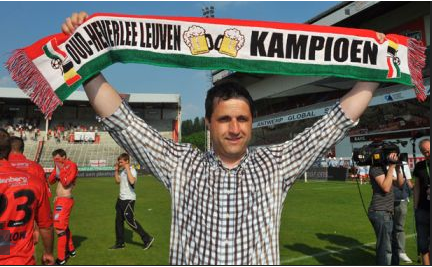
- Van Geneugden in 2011

Personal information
- Full name: Ronny Van Geneugden
- Date of birth: 17 August 1968 (age 58)
- Place of birth: Hasselt, Belgium
- Height: 1.83 m (6 ft 0 in)
- Position: Midfielder

Team information
- Current team: MVV Maastricht

Senior career*
Years	Team	Apps	(Gls)
1980–1988	Thor Waterschei		
1988–1989	RKC Waalwijk		
1989–1992	FC Antwerp	46	(2)
1992–1997	Lommel	85	(15)
1997	Germinal Ekeren		
1997–2000	Lokeren		
2000–2002	Verbroedering Geel		

Managerial career
- 2001–2003: Excelsior Veldwezelt
- 2003–2004: Genk (youth)
- 2004: Genk (caretaker)
- 2004–2008: Genk (youth)
- 2008–2009: Genk
- 2010–2014: OH Leuven
- 2014: Waasland-Beveren
- 2015–2016: Enosis Neon Paralimni
- 2017–2019: Malawi
- 2019–2020: Lommel (sports director)
- 2021–: MVV Maastricht (technical director)
- * Club domestic league appearances and goals

Ronny Van Geneugden (Dutch pronunciation: [ˈrɔni vɑŋ ɣəˈnøːɣdə(n)]; (Note: In isolation, van is pronounced [vɑn].) born 17 August 1968) is a Belgian football coach and former player, currently technical director at MVV Maastricht.

As a manager, Van Geneugden had most of his successes with Oud-Heverlee Leuven, leading them to the Belgian Second Division title in 2010–11, hence gaining promotion to the 1st division for season 2011–12, he was rewarded with a contract extension to 2015. Despite two successful seasons in the 1st division where Oud-Heverlee Leuven finished mid-table, his contract was terminated on 21 January 2014 as his team sat second bottom of the 1st division after a poor first half of the 2013–14 season.

In April 2017, Van Geneugden signed a 2-year-deal in Malawi as the head coach of the national team. The contract expired on 31 March 2019 and on 6 April 2019, the Football Association of Malawi announced that the contract would not be renewed.

== Club career ==
He played for Thor Waterschei, RKC Waalwijk, Antwerp, SK Lommel, Germinal Ekeren, Lokeren and Verbroedering Geel.
