= 2011–12 Oud-Heverlee Leuven season =

Oud-Heverlee Leuven
2011–12 season
- Chairman: (Belgium) Jan Callewaert
- Manager: (Belgium) Ronny Van Geneugden
- Stadium: Den Dreef
- Belgian Pro League: 14th
- Belgian Cup: Round 6
- Top goalscorer: League: Jordan Remacle (15); All: Jordan Remacle (16)
- Highest home attendance: 8,519 v. Standard Liège and v. Club Brugge
- Lowest home attendance: 5,672 v. Mons
Home colours	Away colours

The 2011–12 season was Oud-Heverlee Leuven's 10th competitive season since the 2002 fusion between Stade Leuven, Daring Club Leuven and Zwarte Duivels Oud-Heverlee. It was their first season in the Belgian Pro League after being promoted from the Belgian Second Division and the first time in 61 years a team from the city of Leuven played in the highest division. OH Leuven finished in 14th place, one place clear of the relegation zone, thereby prolonging their stay at the top flight. Their cup run was unsuccessful, losing out to Rupel Boom form the third division in round 6, which was the round where the team entered the cup.

== Key dates ==
=== Pre-season ===
- 05.05.2011: During the official celebration of the promotion at the Leuven city hall, it is announced that coach Ronny Van Geneugden has signed a new contract agreement, linking him to Oud-Heverlee Leuven for the next four seasons.
- 30.05.2011: Jordan Remacle, one of the key players for OHL during the previous season with 16 goals and 20 assists, signs a new contract until 2014.
- 15.06.2011: OHL signs 28-year-old midfielder and 2-time Belgian international Kevin Roelandts from Zulte Waregem and also announces on the official website that an agreement has been found to sign Frederik Boi from Cercle Brugge. Cercle Brugge fans react surprised to see Boi leave after he has spent the last 22 years with the club and soon after Cercle Brugge officially denies that an agreement has been found and states that Boi has a contract running for two more years at Cercle.
- 20.06.2011: After more than a month of rumours and false transfer announcements, it is finally confirmed that Tunisian forward Hamdi Harbaoui is leaving Oud-Heverlee Leuven. Harbaoui was the top scorer in the 2010–11 Belgian Second Division with 25 goals, but decided to move to Lokeren. Later on the same day, OHL announced three new signings: defender Jorn Vermeulen from Club Brugge and midfielders Thomas Azevedo and Emmerik De Vriese from second division teams Lommel United and Antwerp respectively.
- 22.06.2011: Belgian Pro League fixtures for the 2011–12 season are announced. Oud-Heverlee Leuven opens the season with a home match against Anderlecht.
- 24.06.2011: it is announced that supporters of OHL are massively buying season tickets, with already 4050 sold over a month before the start of the new season, a club record. The stadium expansion will eventually allow 9000 spectators. On the same day, Anderlecht comes to an agreement with Oud-Heverlee Leuven to loan out Senegalese midfielder Christophe Diandy for one season, at that point already the fifth incoming transfer for OHL.
- 27.06.2011: With second division top scorer Harbaoui transferring to Lokeren, OHL decides to buy a replacement as they sign third division top scorer Patrick Amoah from WS Woluwe. The 24-year-old Swedish forward with roots in Ghana scored 27 goals during the previous season.
- 30.06.2011: The transfer of Frederik Boi from Cercle Brugge to OHL is finally concluded as both clubs find an agreement.

=== Regular season in 2011 ===
- 29.07.2011: OHL immediately causes a major upset by beating Anderlecht 2-1 at home on the first matchday due to an injury time winner by Patrick Amoah.
- 31.07.2011: The news is released that Kenneth Van Goethem suffered a severe knee-injury during the opening match, ruling him out of contention for at least 6 months.
- 04.08.2011: Belgian defensive midfielder Floribert N'Galula is signed from Finnish team TPS Turku to replace the injured Van Goethem.
- 10.08.2011: After a week of testing, OH Leuven signs Nigerian striker Derick Ogbu. Ogbu had already tested twice with PSV Eindhoven after being recommended by Henk ten Cate. Eventually he could not be signed by PSV as his visa expired and eventually he ended up at OHL.
- 19.08.2011: OH Leuven confirms the signing of Belgian goalkeeper Thomas Kaminski from Beerschot AC. Contrary to earlier reports, Kaminski is not on loan from Anderlecht, but has made a deal with both clubs that he will play one season for Leuven, before moving to Anderlecht.
- 23.08.2011: The draw for the 2011–12 Belgian Cup is made, giving OH Leuven a home draw against the winner of the match between Cappellen (4th division) and Rupel Boom (3rd division). Should Leuven win the match, then they will play the next round away to Lommel United, Neerpelt or Anderlecht.
- 30.08.2011: Although his contract continued until 2012, Yannick Euvrard moves to second division team Roeselare. Euvrard was part of the team that became 2010–11 Belgian Second Division champions, but seemed not to fit into the plans. After 5 matches without being on the pitch, he decided it was better to leave. On the same day, OH Leuven announced the coming of Czech defender Radek Dejmek, on loan from Slovan Liberec until the end of the season. The contract also includes an option to buy.
- 31.08.2011: On the last day of the transfer period, Olympia Wijgmaal loans yet another OHL player as Simon Vermeiren leaves the team for one season at the third division team. Later that day the signing of Belgian international Karel Geraerts is confirmed, after the news had already spread through various media the day before. No transfer sum was paid, as Geraerts did no longer fit into the plans at Club Brugge and was allowed to leave for free
- 10.09.2011: During training Kevin Roelandts suffers an ankle injury, ruling him out of contention for at least 3 months.
- 21.09.2011: In the Belgian Cup, OH Leuven is immediately eliminated after a 1–2 home loss against Third Division team Rupel Boom. The fact that OH Leuven loses at home, that it is the only team from the Belgian Pro League to be eliminated at that point and that the team missed out on an away match in the next round against Anderlecht causes coach Ronny Van Geneugden to state that "this is my biggest deception in a very long time".
- 24.09.2011: During the final minutes of the 1–1 home draw against reigning champions Genk, experienced defender Nicky Hayen suffers a serious injury as he tears one of his anterior cruciate ligaments. Later that evening it is confirmed that it will keep him out of contention for around 6 months. After Kenneth Van Goethem and Kevin Roelandts, Hayen is the third key player to suffer a major injury during the season.
- 10.11.2011: After suffering an injury earlier in a match with the Belgium national under-17 football team during the 2012 UEFA European Under-17 Football Championship qualifying round, promising youngster Joren Dehond is diagnosed with a torn meniscus. Joren will need to undergo surgery and will be out for 6 tot 8 weeks. A status update of the other long-term injured players is also given: the revalidation of Kenneth Van Goethem goes well, he is starting with individual running exercises. Kevin Roelandts is already training individually and plans to rejoin the group in about two weeks, while Nicky Hayen is still at the very beginning of his revalidation period, he is not yet allowed to use his right leg.
- 12.12.2011: OHL is hit by a fourth major first-team injury as left-back Koen Weuts tears a part of his medial collateral ligament during the home match against Zulte Waregem. It is estimated that Weuts will probably be sidelined for four to six weeks. In recovery he joins first team players Kenneth Van Goethem and Nicky Hayen and youngster Joren Dehond. Meanwhile, Kevin Roelandts is scheduled to play in a friendly match on 14 December, which will be his first match after his ankle injury.
- 27.12.2011: At the start of the winter break, after a streak of four unbeaten matches, OHL is in 11th position with 20 points out of 19 matches. Coach Ronny Van Geneugden is very happy with the results, stating that the 11th place is magnificent seeing the number of long term injuries the team had to undergo. Negative points are the early elimination in the Belgian Cup and the fact that OHL could only score few points against direct competitors. Van Geneugden also mentions the huge support from the home fans and how this has helped the team to take points from big teams Anderlecht, Club Brugge and Genk. Finally, he states the end goal is to score 30 points after 30 matches, which should be enough to avoid the relegation playoffs.
- 27.12.2011: The 19-year-old nephew of former OHL player Toni Brogno signs for OHL. Belgian youngster Loris Brogno is a left-footed striker, signed from Charleroi and regarded as a prospect for the future.
- 28.12.2011: OHL and Swedish striker Patrick Amoah mutually agree to terminate their contract. Amoah was the match winner in the opening match against Anderlecht, scoring the 2-1 goal in injury time. However, after sending the OHL supporters into delirium during this first match, Amoah had faded away and mostly featured in the reserve matches only. Amoah immediately rejoined his former team WS Woluwe.

=== Regular season in 2012 ===
- 10.01.2012: Icelandic defensive midfielder Stefán Gíslason signs a 1.5 year contract after he was released from Lillestrøm. Gíslason, a former youth player of Arsenal, is expected to immediately make an impact in the first team and is signed to take over the role of the injured Nicky Hayen.
- 20.01.2012: Thirty-two-year-old striker Ibrahim Salou returns to Belgium as he signs for OHL. After leaving Club Brugge in 2008, Salou had spells in Germany with Duisburg, Denmark with Vejle and USA with the New York Red Bulls. After being released in New York, he had been looking for a club in Belgium and ended up with Oud-Heverlee Leuven.
- 26.01.2012: After days of speculating, attacking midfielder Sacha Iakovenko of Anderlecht joins OHL on loan as he had to make a decision over which club to join, either Oud-Heverlee Leuven or Westerlo. Iakovenko had worked with coach Ronny Van Geneugden before at Genk and is delighted to be able to do so again.
- 29.01.2012: Club monument Joeri Vastmans leaves the club as both parties agree to terminate the contract. Vastmans, at OHL for 6 seasons and still popular with many of the fans, had only been subbed on once during the season and since he was not guaranteed more opportunities, opted to look for a new club.
- 31.01.2012: With several players returning from injury and with the signings of Ibrahim Salou and Sacha Iakovenko, 25-year-old midfielder Tail Schoonjans is deemed surplus and therefore loaned out to second division team Sint-Niklaas. Although Schoonjans only has a contract until the end of the season, OHL has an option to prolong his contract.
- 11.02.2012: In a direct relegation battle away to Westerlo, OHL secures a crucial 1-3 victory, moving 8 points clear of the relegation playoffs with only 5 matches to go. Goals came from Wim Raymaekers, Jordan Remacle and Sacha Iakovenko. Iakovenko remained calm after his goal and did not celebrate his goal, as between 2009 and 2011 he nearly played two full seasons for Westerlo. In the media, it is now assumed that 15th and 16th placed teams Westerlo and Sint-Truiden will face each other in the relegation playoffs.
- 03.03.2012: After a dull 0-0 draw at home against Lierse, OHL can no longer finishing lower than 14th, thereby avoiding the relegation playoffs and thus qualifying for the 2012–13 Belgian Pro League. For the first time in Belgian football, a team form the city of Leuven manages to spend more than one consecutive season at the highest level.
- 13.03.2012: After a successful season as captain of the team in which he also scored three goals, 31-year-old club-icon Bjorn Ruytinx is rewarded with a new one-year contract.

=== Playoffs ===
- 22.03.2012: After finishing the regular season in 14th place, OHL was paired with Cercle Brugge, Mechelen en Lierse in playoff 2. The draw is released, with OHL starting at home against Lierse.
- 27.04.2012: A first transfer for the new season is announced, as Belgian Lierse defender Kenny Thompson signs for OHL.
- 05.05.2012: The season ends for OH Leuven as the playoffs conclude with OH Leuven ending in second place behind Cercle Brugge. Leuven ends the playoffs with 10 points out of 18 after losing twice, drawing once and winning three matches.

== Team kit ==
The team kits for the 2011–12 season were produced by Vermarc and the main shirt sponsor was Option.

Home	Away	Goalkeeper Home	Goalkeeper Away

== First team squad ==
As of 6 May 2012. OHL Team 2011-12

No.	Name	Nationality	Date of birth (Age at 29/07/2011)	First match for OHL	Previous club/Signed From
Goalkeepers
1	Yves Lenaerts	Belgium	February 27, 1983 (aged 28)	2010	(Belgium) Club Brugge
12	Dean Michiels	Belgium	July 4, 1991 (aged 20)	2010	Youth Product
21	Thomas Kaminski	Belgium	October 23, 1992 (aged 18)	2011	(Belgium) Beerschot
Defenders
2	Frederik Boi	Belgium	October 25, 1981 (aged 29)	2011	(Belgium) Cercle Brugge
3	Nicky Hayen	Belgium	August 16, 1980 (aged 30)	2010	(Netherlands) RBC Roosendaal
4	Wim Raymaekers	Belgium	April 4, 1985 (aged 26)	2010	(Belgium) Red Star Waasland
15	Pieter Nys	Belgium	July 1, 1989 (aged 22)	2010	(Netherlands) Fortuna Sittard
17	Koen Weuts	Belgium	September 18, 1990 (aged 20)	2009	(Belgium) Lierse
24	Radek Dejmek	Czech Republic	February 2, 1988 (aged 23)	2011	(Czech Republic) Slovan Liberec (on loan)
25	Christophe Diandy	Senegal	November 26, 1990 (aged 20)	2011	(Belgium) Anderlecht (on loan)
26	Lionel Gendarme	Belgium	February 20, 1989 (aged 22)	2011	(Belgium) Standard Liège
27	Stefán Gíslason	Iceland	March 15, 1980 (aged 31)	2012	(Norway) Lillestrøm
Midfielders
6	Kenneth Van Goethem	Belgium	February 12, 1984 (aged 27)	2010	(Belgium) KV Mechelen
8	Maxime Annys	Belgium	July 24, 1986 (aged 25)	2009	(Belgium) Tournai
10	Kevin Roelandts	Belgium	August 27, 1982 (aged 28)	2011	(Belgium) Zulte Waregem
16	Jorn Vermeulen	Belgium	April 16, 1987 (aged 24)	2011	(Belgium) Club Brugge
18	Floribert N'Galula	Belgium	March 7, 1987 (aged 24)	2011	(Finland) TPS Turku
20	Karel Geraerts	Belgium	January 5, 1982 (aged 29)	2011	(Belgium) Club Brugge
28	Antoine Palate	Belgium	March 1, 1994 (aged 17)	2011	Youth Product
30	Simon Bracke	Belgium	November 17, 1995 (aged 15)	2011	Youth Product
Forwards
7	Jordan Remacle	Belgium	February 17, 1987 (aged 24)	2010	(Netherlands) RBC Roosendaal
9	Ibrahim Salou	Ghana	May 29, 1979 (aged 32)	2012	(United States) New York Red Bulls
11	Sacha Iakovenko	Ukraine	July 23, 1987 (aged 24)	2012	(Belgium) Anderlecht (on loan)
13	Bjorn Ruytinx	Belgium	August 18, 1980 (aged 30)	2004	(Belgium) Kermt-Hasselt
14	Thomas Azevedo	Belgium	August 31, 1991 (aged 19)	2011	(Belgium) Lommel United
19	Loris Brogno	Belgium	September 18, 1992 (aged 18)	2012	(Belgium) Charleroi
22	Emmerik De Vriese	Belgium	February 14, 1985 (aged 26)	2011	(Belgium) Antwerp
23	Derick Ogbu	Nigeria	March 19, 1990 (aged 21)	2011	(Qatar) Umm Salal
29	Joren Dehond	Belgium	August 8, 1995 (aged 15)	2011	Youth Product

== Transfers ==
=== In ===
==== Summer ====
Squad #	Position	Player	Transferred from	Fee	Date	Source
10	MF	(Belgium) Kevin Roelandts	(Belgium) Zulte Waregem	Undisclosed	15 June 2011	
14	MF	(Belgium) Thomas Azevedo	(Belgium) Lommel United	Undisclosed	20 June 2011	
22	MF	(Belgium) Emmerik De Vriese	(Belgium) Antwerp	Undisclosed	20 June 2011	
16	DF	(Belgium) Jorn Vermeulen	(Belgium) Club Brugge	Undisclosed	20 June 2011	
9	FW	(Sweden) Patrick Amoah	(Belgium) WS Woluwe	Undisclosed	27 June 2011	
2	DF	(Belgium) Frederik Boi	(Belgium) Cercle Brugge	Undisclosed	30 June 2011	
18	MF	(Belgium) Floribert N'Galula	(Finland) TPS Turku	Undisclosed	4 August 2011	
23	FW	(Nigeria) Derick Ogbu	(Qatar) Umm Salal	Undisclosed	10 August 2011	
21	GK	(Belgium) Thomas Kaminski	(Belgium) Beerschot	Undisclosed	19 August 2011	
20	MF	(Belgium) Karel Geraerts	(Belgium) Club Brugge	Free	31 August 2011	

==== Winter ====
Squad #	Position	Player	Transferred from	Fee	Date	Source
9	FW	(Ghana) Ibrahim Salou	(United States) New York Red Bulls	Free	20 January 2012	
19	FW	(Belgium) Loris Brogno	(Belgium) Charleroi	Undisclosed	1 January 2012	
27	DF	(Iceland) Stefán Gíslason	(Norway) Lillestrøm	Free	10 January 2012	

=== Loan In ===
==== Summer ====
Squad #	Position	Player	On loan from	Fee	Date	Source
25	DF	(Senegal) Christophe Diandy	(Belgium) Anderlecht	Undisclosed	24 June 2011	
24	DF	(Czech Republic) Radek Dejmek	(Czech Republic) Slovan Liberec	Undisclosed	30 August 2011	

==== Winter ====
Squad #	Position	Player	On loan from	Fee	Date	Source
	FW	(Ukraine) Sacha Iakovenko	(Belgium) Anderlecht	Undisclosed	26 January 2012	

=== Out ===
==== Summer ====
Squad #	Position	Player	Transferred to	Fee	Date	Source
	MF	(Belgium) Pieter Beckers	(Belgium) RC Mechelen	Undisclosed	30 May 2011	
	MF	(Slovenia) Sandro Bloudek	Free Agent	Contract Ended	1 August 2011	
	DF	(Belgium) Mark De Man	(Belgium) Beerschot	Loan Return	1 June 2011	
	MF	(Belgium) Wouter Scheelen	(Belgium) Westerlo	Loan Return	1 June 2011	
	FW	(Belgium) Kurt Weuts	(Belgium) Sint-Truiden	Loan Return	1 June 2011	
	FW	(Tunisia) Hamdi Harbaoui	(Belgium) Lokeren	Undisclosed	20 June 2011	
	DF	(Belgium) Yannick Euvrard	(Belgium) Roeselare	Undisclosed	30 August 2011	

==== Winter ====
Squad #	Position	Player	Transferred to	Fee	Date	Source
9	FW	(Sweden) Patrick Amoah	(Belgium) WS Woluwe	Free	1 January 2012	
5	DF	(Belgium) Joeri Vastmans	Free Agent	NA	29 January 2012	

=== Loan Out ===
==== Summer ====
Squad #	Position	Player	On loan to	Fee	Date	Source
	GK	(Belgium) Fred Desomberg	(Belgium) Olympia Wijgmaal	Undisclosed	1 August 2011	
	MF	(Belgium) Nicolas De Mol	(Belgium) Olympia Wijgmaal	Undisclosed	1 August 2011	
	DF	(Belgium) Raf Verhamme	(Belgium) Olympia Wijgmaal	Undisclosed	1 August 2011	
	FW	(Belgium) Simon Vermeiren	(Belgium) Olympia Wijgmaal	Undisclosed	31 August 2011	

==== Winter ====
Squad #	Position	Player	On loan to	Fee	Date	Source
11	MF	(Belgium) Tail Schoonjans	(Belgium) Sint-Niklaas	Undisclosed	31 January 2012	

== Statistics ==
=== Appearances and goals ===
Last updated on 6 May 2012.

No.	Pos	Nat	Player	Total		Belgian Pro League		Belgian Cup	
No.	Pos	Nat	Player	Apps	Goals	Apps	Goals	Apps	Goals
1	GK	(Belgium) BEL	Yves Lenaerts	11	0	11	0	0	0
2	DF	(Belgium) BEL	Frederik Boi	27	3	23+3	3	1	0
3	DF	(Belgium) BEL	Nicky Hayen	9	1	8	1	1	0
4	DF	(Belgium) BEL	Wim Raymaekers	30	1	29+1	1	0	0
6	MF	(Belgium) BEL	Kenneth Van Goethem	5	0	5	0	0	0
7	FW	(Belgium) BEL	Jordan Remacle	36	16	35	15	1	1
8	MF	(Belgium) BEL	Maxime Annys	27	0	21+5	0	1	0
9	FW	(Ghana) GHA	Ibrahim Salou	9	0	1+8	0	0	0
10	MF	(Belgium) BEL	Kevin Roelandts	10	1	5+5	1	0	0
11	FW	(Ukraine) UKR	Sacha Iakovenko	13	3	11+2	3	0	0
12	GK	(Belgium) BEL	Dean Michiels	0	0	0	0	0	0
13	FW	(Belgium) BEL	Bjorn Ruytinx	34	4	28+5	4	1	0
14	MF	(Belgium) BEL	Thomas Azevedo	25	3	13+11	3	0+1	0
15	DF	(Belgium) BEL	Pieter Nys	10	1	6+4	1	0	0
16	MF	(Belgium) BEL	Jorn Vermeulen	25	0	24+1	0	0	0
17	DF	(Belgium) BEL	Koen Weuts	26	0	23+2	0	1	0
18	MF	(Belgium) BEL	Floribert N'Galula	18	0	15+3	0	0	0
19	FW	(Belgium) BEL	Loris Brogno	6	1	0+6	1	0	0
20	MF	(Belgium) BEL	Karel Geraerts	26	3	23+2	3	1	0
21	GK	(Belgium) BEL	Thomas Kaminski	26	0	25	0	1	0
22	MF	(Belgium) BEL	Emmerik De Vriese	16	1	5+10	1	1	0
23	FW	(Nigeria) NGA	Derick Ogbu	23	10	19+4	10	0	0
24	DF	(Czech Republic) CZE	Radek Dejmek	23	2	20+2	2	1	0
25	DF	(Senegal) SEN	Christophe Diandy	29	0	23+6	0	0	0
26	DF	(Belgium) BEL	Lionel Gendarme	9	0	7+2	0	0	0
27	DF	(Iceland) ISL	Stefán Gíslason	13	1	13	1	0	0
28	MF	(Belgium) BEL	Antoine Palate	0	0	0	0	0	0
29	FW	(Belgium) BEL	Joren Dehond	2	0	0+2	0	0	0
30	MF	(Belgium) BEL	Simon Bracke	0	0	0	0	0	0
Players who are out on loan
11	FW	(Belgium) BEL	Tail Schoonjans	3	0	0+2	0	0+1	0
Players who have left the club
5	DF	(Belgium) BEL	Joeri Vastmans	1	0	0+1	0	0	0
9	FW	(Sweden) SWE	Patrick Amoah	10	1	2+7	1	1	0

=== Top scorers ===
Includes all competitive matches. The list is sorted by league goals when total goals are equal.

=== Goals ===
R	Player	Position	Belgian Pro League	Belgian Cup	Total
1	(Belgium) Jordan Remacle	LW	15	1	16
2	(Nigeria) Derick Ogbu	CF	10	0	10
3	(Belgium) Bjorn Ruytinx	CF	4	0	4
4	(Belgium) Thomas Azevedo	LW	3	0	3
4	(Belgium) Frederik Boi	RB / RW	3	0	3
4	(Belgium) Karel Geraerts	CM	3	0	3
4	(Ukraine) Sacha Iakovenko	LW	3	0	3
8	(Czech Republic) Radek Dejmek	CB	2	0	2
9	(Sweden) Patrick Amoah	CF	1	0	1
9	(Belgium) Loris Brogno	CF	1	0	1
9	(Belgium) Emmerik De Vriese	LW	1	0	1
9	(Iceland) Stefán Gíslason	CB	1	0	1
9	(Belgium) Nicky Hayen	CB	1	0	1
9	(Belgium) Pieter Nys	CB	1	0	1
9	(Belgium) Wim Raymaekers	CB	1	0	1
9	(Belgium) Kevin Roelandts	CM	1	0	1

Last updated: 6 May 2012
Source: Match reports in Competitive matches

==== Penalties Taken ====
Date	Penalty Taker	Scored	Opponent	Competition	Opposing Goalkeeper
20 August 2011	(Belgium) Jordan Remacle	Yes	at home vs. Mechelen	Belgian Pro League	(Belgium) Olivier Renard
10 September 2011	(Belgium) Jordan Remacle	Yes	at home vs. Mons	Belgian Pro League	(France) Cédric Berthelin
21 September 2011	(Belgium) Jordan Remacle	Yes	at home vs. Rupel Boom	Belgian Cup	(Belgium) Ruben Smet
10 December 2011	(Belgium) Jordan Remacle	Yes	at home vs. Zulte Waregem	Belgian Pro League	(Belgium) Sammy Bossut
21 January 2012	(Belgium) Jordan Remacle	Yes	away to Mons	Belgian Pro League	(France) Cédric Berthelin
14 April 2012	(Belgium) Jordan Remacle	Yes	away to Mechelen	Belgian Pro League	(Belgium) Wouter Biebauw
21 April 2012	(Belgium) Jordan Remacle	Yes	at home vs. Mechelen	Belgian Pro League	(Belgium) Wouter Biebauw
28 April 2012	(Belgium) Jordan Remacle	Yes	at home vs. Cercle Brugge	Belgian Pro League	(Belgium) Jo Coppens

=== Goals conceded ===
Includes all competitive matches. Sorted by shirt number.

Last updated on 6 May 2012

Position	Nation	Number	Name	Belgian Pro League	Belgian Cup	Total	Minutes per goal
GK	(Belgium)	1	Yves Lenaerts	14	0	14	70.71
GK	(Belgium)	12	Dean Michiels	0	0	0	0
GK	(Belgium)	21	Thomas Kaminski	58	2	60	39
TOTALS				72	2	74	45

==== Penalties Conceded ====
Date	Penalty Taker	Scored	Opponent	Competition	OHL Goalkeeper
31 July	(Belgium) Romelu Lukaku	No	at home vs. Anderlecht	Belgian Pro League	(Belgium) Yves Lenaerts
21 September	(Belgium) Dries Ventose	Yes	at home vs. Rupel Boom	Belgian Cup	(Belgium) Thomas Kaminski
21 September	(Belgium) Dries Ventose	Yes	at home vs. Rupel Boom	Belgian Cup	(Belgium) Thomas Kaminski
1 October	(Senegal) Elimane Coulibaly	Yes	away to Gent	Belgian Pro League	(Belgium) Thomas Kaminski
30 October	(Uruguay) Gary Kagelmacher	Yes	at home vs. Beerschot	Belgian Pro League	(Belgium) Thomas Kaminski
26 November	(Iran) Reza Ghoochannejhad	Yes	away to Sint-Truiden	Belgian Pro League	(Belgium) Thomas Kaminski
19 February	(Belgium) Gregory Mertens	Yes	at home vs. Cercle Brugge	Belgian Pro League	(Belgium) Thomas Kaminski
31 March	(Egypt) Mohamed El-Gabbas	Yes	at home vs. Lierse	Belgian Pro League	(Belgium) Thomas Kaminski

=== Disciplinary record ===
Includes all competitive matches. Players with 1 card or more included only.

Last updated on 6 May 2012

Position	Nation	Number	Name	Belgian Pro League		Belgian Cup		Total	
Position	Nation	Number	Name	Booked	Sent off (straight red)	Booked	Sent off (straight red)	Booked	Sent off (straight red)
GK	(Belgium)	1	Yves Lenaerts	1	0	0	0	1	0
MF	(Belgium)	2	Frederik Boi	6	0	0	0	6	0
DF	(Belgium)	3	Nicky Hayen	1	0	1	0	2	0
DF	(Belgium)	4	Wim Raymaekers	5	1	0	0	5	1
FW	(Belgium)	7	Jordan Remacle	6	0	1	0	7	0
FW	(Belgium)	8	Maxime Annys	10	0	0	0	10	0
FW	(Sweden)	9	Patrick Amoah	1	0	0	0	1	0
FW	(Ghana)	9	Ibrahim Salou	1	0	0	0	1	0
MF	(Belgium)	10	Kevin Roelandts	3	0	0	0	3	0
FW	(Belgium)	13	Bjorn Ruytinx	13	0	0	0	13	0
DF	(Belgium)	15	Pieter Nys	2	1	0	0	2	1
MF	(Belgium)	16	Jorn Vermeulen	2	0	0	0	2	0
MF	(Belgium)	17	Koen Weuts	3	0	0	0	3	0
MF	(Belgium)	18	Floribert N'Galula	4	0	0	0	4	0
MF	(Belgium)	20	Karel Geraerts	6	0	0	0	6	0
FW	(Belgium)	21	Thomas Kaminski	1	0	0	0	1	0
FW	(Nigeria)	23	Derick Ogbu	1	0	0	0	1	0
DF	(Czech Republic)	24	Radek Dejmek	3	0	0	0	3	0
DF	(Senegal)	25	Christophe Diandy	3	0	0	0	3	0
DF	(Belgium)	26	Lionel Gendarme	1	1	0	0	1	1
DF	(Iceland)	27	Stefán Gíslason	1	0	0	0	1	0
			TOTALS	73	3	2	0	75	3

=== Suspensions during the season ===
Includes suspensions for competitive matches.

Last updated on 6 May 2012

Date	Player	Reason	Punishment	Source
16 August 2011 (appeal 19 August 2011)	(Belgium) Wim Raymaekers	Red card for tackle on Club Brugge player (Norway) Tom Høgli.	Two-match ban, after appeal reduced to one-match (away to Lokeren)	ohl.be
30 October 2011	(Belgium) Bjorn Ruytinx	Automatic suspension after collecting five yellow cards.	One match ban (away to Lierse)	ohl.be
26 November 2011	(Belgium) Maxime Annys	Automatic suspension after collecting five yellow cards.	One match ban (away to Anderlecht)	ohl.be
26 December 2011 (appeal 30 December 2011)	(Belgium) Lionel Gendarme	Red card for tackle on Mechelen player (Belgium) Alessandro Cordaro.	Three-match ban, after appeal reduced to one-match (at home vs Lokeren)	ohl.be
15 January 2012	(Belgium) Frederik Boi	Automatic suspension after collecting five yellow cards.	One match ban (away to Mons)	
11 February 2012	(Belgium) Jordan Remacle	Automatic suspension after collecting five yellow cards.	One match ban (at home vs Cercle Brugge)	
18 February 2012	(Belgium) Karel Geraerts	Automatic suspension after collecting five yellow cards.	One match ban (away to Beerschot)	
18 March 2012	(Belgium) Bjorn Ruytinx	Automatic suspension after collecting ten yellow cards.	Two matches ban (twice at home, vs Sint-Truiden and vs Lierse)	
7 April 2012	(Belgium) Maxime Annys	Automatic suspension after collecting ten yellow cards.	Two matches ban (both vs Mechelen, first away, then at home)	
14 April 2012	(Belgium) Wim Raymaekers	Automatic suspension after collecting five yellow cards.	One match ban (at home vs Mechelen)	

=== Severe injuries during the season ===
Last updated on 6 May 2012

Date	Player	Injury	Initial Estimated Return	In Full Training	First Match after Injury	Source
29 July 2011	(Belgium) Kenneth Van Goethem	Torn anterior cruciate ligament during the match against Anderlecht.	February–March 2012	Beginning of January 2012		ohl.be
8 September 2011	(Belgium) Kevin Roelandts	Ankle tendon injury during training.	December 2011	6 December 2011	14 December 2011	ohl.be
24 September 2011	(Belgium) Nicky Hayen	Torn anterior cruciate ligament during the match against Genk.	March–April 2012	Still Injured		ohl.be
30 October 2011	(Belgium) Joren Dehond	Torn meniscus during the match with the Belgium national under-17 football team.	January–February 2012	January 2012	20 January 2012	ohl.be
10 December 2011	(Belgium) Koen Weuts	Torn medial band during the match against Zulte Waregem.	February 2012	January 2012		ohl.be

== Starting 11 ==
Only considering Belgian Pro League starts.

No.	Pos.	Name	Starts
21	GK	(Belgium) Thomas Kaminski	25
2	DF	(Belgium) Frederik Boi	23
24	DF	(Czech Republic) Radek Dejmek	19
4	DF	(Belgium) Wim Raymaekers	29
17	DF	(Belgium) Koen Weuts	24
16	MF	(Belgium) Jorn Vermeulen	24
8	MF	(Belgium) Maxime Annys	21
20	MF	(Belgium) Karel Geraerts	23
18	MF	(Belgium) Floribert N'Galula	15
7	FW	(Belgium) Jordan Remacle	35
13	FW	(Belgium) Bjorn Ruytinx (Captain)	28

=== Overall ===
Games played	37 (36 Belgian Pro League, 1 Belgian Cup)
Games won	10 (10 Belgian Pro League, 0 Belgian Cup)
Games drawn	9 (9 Belgian Pro League, 0 Belgian Cup)
Games lost	18 (17 Belgian Pro League, 1 Belgian Cup)
Goals scored	54
Goals conceded	74
Goal difference	-20
Clean sheets	3
Yellow cards	75
Red cards	3
Worst discipline	(Belgium) Bjorn Ruytinx 13 (yellow card) 0 (yellow card) (yellow-red card)
Best result(s)	W 3 - 1 (H) v Mons - Belgian Pro League - 10 September 2011; W 3 - 1 (H) v Club Brugge - Belgian Pro League - 18 December 2011; W 3 - 1 (A) v Westerlo - Belgian Pro League - 11 February 2012; W 3 - 1 (H) v Sint-Truiden - Belgian Pro League - 21 March 2012; W 4 - 2 (H) v Mechelen - Belgian Pro League - 21 April 2012
Worst result(s)	L 6 - 1 (A) v Gent - Belgian Pro League - 1 October 2011
Most appearances	(Belgium) Jordan Remacle (36)
Top scorer	(Belgium) Jordan Remacle (16)

Last updated: 6 May 2012
Source: Competitions' Wikipedia articles.

== Club ==
=== Coaching staff ===
Position	Staff
Head Coach	(Belgium) Ronny Van Geneugden
Assistant First Team Coach	(Belgium) Hans Vander Elst
Goalkeeping coach	(Belgium) Jurgen De Braekeleer

Last updated: 20 July 2011
Source: OHL.be

=== Other information ===
Owner/Chairman	(Belgium) Jan Callewaert
Ground (capacity and dimensions)	Den Dreef (9,000 / )

Updated to match played 20 July 2011
Source: OHL.be

== Competitions ==
Competition	Started round	Current position / round	Final position / round	First match	Last match
Belgian Pro League	—	—	14th (Europa League Playoff)	29 July 2011	5 May 2012
Belgian Cup	6th Round	—	6th Round	21 September 2011	21 September 2011

Updated to match played 25 March 2012
Source: Competitions

=== Friendly matches ===
==== Pre-season ====
25 June 2011	Stormvogels Haasrode (Belgium)	0 – 8	(Belgium) Oud-Heverlee Leuven	Rudy Delangstadion, Blanden
16:00 CEST		(Report)	Bloudek 6'; Azevedo 34'; Ruytinx 39'; De Vriese 63'; Vermeulen 67'; Bojović 71'; Roelandts 77'; Diandy 89' (pen.)	Referee: Nathan Verboomen

29 June 2011	Kampenhout (Belgium)	1 – 3	(Belgium) Oud-Heverlee Leuven	De Zeype, Kampenhout
20:00 CEST	Colson 74'	(Report)	Amoah 49'; Hayen 61'; Weuts 81'	Referee: Dries Vanvinkenroye

2 July 2011	Cercle Brugge (Belgium)	2 – 2	(Belgium) Oud-Heverlee Leuven	Stadion FC Veldegem, Veldegem
19:00 CEST	Janssens 7'; Naudts 53'	(Report)	Annys 4'; Hayen 19'	Referee: Jurgen Brinckman

6 July 2011	Woluwe-Zaventem (Belgium)	0 – 2	(Belgium) Oud-Heverlee Leuven	Gemeentelijk Sportstadion, Zaventem
20:00 CEST		(Report)	Nys 19'; Remacle 55' (pen.)	Referee: Erik Bury

9 July 2011	Taxandria (Netherlands)	0 – 4	(Belgium) Oud-Heverlee Leuven	De Gemullehoeken, Oisterwijk
19:30 CEST		(Report)	Remacle 53'; Roelandts 73', 75'; Ruytinx 85'

10 July 2011	Olympia Wijgmaal (Belgium)	0 – 4	(Belgium) Oud-Heverlee Leuven	Wijgmaal stadion, Wijgmaal
17:00 CEST		(Report)	Roelandts 48'; Remacle 61'; De Vriese 65'; Ruytinx 82'	Referee: Peter Ebraert

13 July 2011	Oud-Heverlee Leuven (Belgium)	0 – 2	(Netherlands) NEC	Den Dreef, Heverlee
19:00 CEST		(Report)	van der Velden 49' van Eijden 69'	Referee: Kenny Snoeck

16 July 2011	Brussels (Belgium)	1 – 1	(Belgium) Oud-Heverlee Leuven	Wijgmaal stadion, Wijgmaal
19:00 CEST	Tambwe 58'	(Report)	Annys 4'	Referee: Erik Bury

20 July 2011	Oud-Heverlee Leuven (Belgium)	2 – 4	(Turkey) Gençlerbirliği	Den Dreef, Heverlee
19:00 CEST	Remacle 7'; Ruytinx 45'	(Report)	Sulu 37'; Öztekin 70' (pen.); Aytaç 76'; Delibalta 82'

23 July 2011	Oud-Heverlee Leuven (Belgium)	0 – 4	(Spain) Getafe	Den Dreef, Heverlee
18:00 CEST		(Report)	Castro 9'; Pérez Navarro 22'; Mosquera 82'; Sánchez García 84'

==== During the season ====
29 November 2011	Oud-Heverlee Leuven (Belgium)	1 – 1	(Belgium) Woluwe-Zaventem	Gemeentelijk stadion, Oud-Heverlee
20:00 CET	Raguet	(Report)	Etumba (pen.)

13 December 2011	Oud-Heverlee Leuven (Belgium)	5 – 1	(Belgium) Lubbeek	Bruineveld, Kessel-Lo
19:30 CET	De Vriese; Kempeneers; Amoah; Shallow; Schoonjans	(Report)	Theys

7 January 2012	Wingene (Belgium)	Cancelled	(Belgium) Oud-Heverlee Leuven	Gemeentelijk sportstadion, Wingene
19:00 CET		(Report)

7 January 2012	Union (Belgium)	2 – 0	(Belgium) Oud-Heverlee Leuven	Sportcomplex Molenhoek, Knokke-Heist
14:30 CET	unknown unknown	(Report)

11 January 2012	Oud-Heverlee Leuven (Belgium)	5 – 0	(Belgium) Kampenhout	Bruineveld, Kessel-Lo
19:00 CET	Shallow 12', 14'; Brogno 15'; De Vriese 44'; Bracke 60' (pen.)	(Report)

=== Belgian Pro League ===
OHL's first season in the Belgian Pro League began on 29 July 2011.

==== Regular season ====
===== League table =====
Pos	Team	Pld	W	D	L	GF	GA	GD	Pts	Qualification
12	Lierse	30	6	13	11	24	36	−12	31	Qualification to Europa League play-offs
13	Zulte Waregem	30	6	12	12	32	38	−6	30	Qualification to Europa League play-offs
14	OH Leuven	30	7	8	15	38	58	−20	29	Qualification to Europa League play-offs
15	Westerlo	30	5	5	20	29	59	−30	20	Qualification to the Relegation play-offs
16	Sint-Truiden	30	3	10	17	32	61	−29	19	Qualification to the Relegation play-offs

Source: soccerway.com
Rules for classification: 1) points; 2) number of matches won; if teams are still tied a playoff is organised.

===== Results summary =====
Overall								Home						Away					
Pld	W	D	L	GF	GA	GD	Pts	W	D	L	GF	GA	GD	W	D	L	GF	GA	GD
30	7	8	15	38	58	−20	29	5	5	5	25	24	+1	2	3	10	13	34	−21

Last updated: 22 March 2012.

===== Points breakdown =====
Points at home: 20
Points away from home: 9

Points against 2010/11 Playoff 1 teams (6): 12
Points against 2010/11 Playoff 2 teams (8): 13
Points against newly promoted teams (1): 4

6 points: none
4 points: Anderlecht, Lokeren, Mons, Westerlo
3 points: Beerschot, Club Brugge, Sint-Truiden
2 points: none
1 point: Genk, Lierse, Mechelen, Zulte Waregem
0 points: Cercle Brugge, Gent, Kortrijk, Standard Liège

===== Biggest & smallest =====
Biggest home win: 3–1 vs. Mons; 3–1 vs. Club Brugge; 3–1 vs. Sint-Truiden
Biggest home defeat: 1–3 vs. Standard Liège; 0–2 vs. Kortrijk
Biggest away win: 1–3 vs. Westerlo
Biggest away defeat: 6–1 vs. Gent; 5–0 vs. Genk

Biggest home attendance: 8,519 vs. Club Brugge and vs. Standard Liège
Smallest home attendance: 5,672 vs. Mons
Biggest away attendance: 24,806 vs. Club Brugge
Smallest away attendance: 4,000 vs. Mons

===== Results by round =====
Round	1	2	3	4	5	6	7	8	9	10	11	12	13	14	15	16	17	18	19	20	21	22	23	24	25	26	27	28	29	30
Ground	H	A	A	H	A	H	A	H	A	H	A	H	A	H	A	A	H	H	A	H	A	H	A	H	A	H	A	H	A	H
Result	W	L	L	L	W	W	L	D	L	D	L	W	L	L	L	D	D	W	D	D	D	L	L	L	W	L	L	D	L	W
Position	3	7	12	13	9	7	10	9	9	11	12	9	11	12	12	12	12	11	11	11	12	12	13	14	13	14	14	14	14	14

A = Away; H = Home; W = Win; D = Draw; L = Loss

==== Playoffs ====
After finishing 14th during the regular season, OHL was placed in Group A of the Europa League Playoff together with Cercle Brugge, Lierse and Mechelen.

===== Table =====
Pos	Team	Pld	W	D	L	GF	GA	GD	Pts	Qualification
1	Cercle Brugge	6	3	2	1	16	10	+6	11	Playoff Final
2	OH Leuven	6	3	1	2	15	14	+1	10	
3	Lierse	6	1	4	1	7	7	0	7	
4	Mechelen	6	1	1	4	7	14	−7	4	

==== Matches ====
29 July 2011 Matchday 1	Oud-Heverlee Leuven	2 – 1	Anderlecht	Den Dreef, Heverlee
20:30 CEST	Lenaerts (yellow card) 12'; Roelandts (yellow card) 24'; Samuel 53' (o.g.); Amoah (yellow card) 58'; Amoah 90+2'	Report	Samuel (yellow card) 18'; Gillet (yellow card) 23'; Odoi (red card) 35'; Proto (yellow card) 35'; Lukaku 37'; Mareček (yellow card) 61'; Suárez (yellow card) 63'	Attendance: 8,156; Referee: Serge Gumienny

6 August 2011 Matchday 2	Zulte Waregem	2 – 1	Oud-Heverlee Leuven	Regenboogstadion, Waregem
20:00 CEST	Matton 3'; Trajkovski 37'; Rossini (yellow card) 45+1'; Bossut (yellow card) 81'	Report	Roelandts (yellow card) 66'; Boi (yellow card) 75'; Remacle 81'	Attendance: 6,703; Referee: Gunter Boelen

13 August 2011 Matchday 3	Club Brugge	1 – 0	Oud-Heverlee Leuven	Jan Breydel Stadium, Bruges
20:00 CEST	Vleminckx (yellow card) 40'; De Jonghe (yellow card) 63'; Refaelov (red card) 68'; Roelandts 81' (o.g.); Vázquez (yellow card) 82'	Report	Remacle (yellow card) 14'; Ruytinx (yellow card) 45'; Raymaekers (red card) 59'; Hayen (yellow card) 83'	Attendance: 24,809; Referee: Tim Pots

20 August 2011 Matchday 4	Oud-Heverlee Leuven	1 – 2	KV Mechelen	Den Dreef, Heverlee
20:00 CEST	Remacle 45+2' (pen.); N'Galula (yellow card) 59'	Report	Cordaro 8'; Vandenbergh (yellow card) 18'; Ghomsi (yellow card) 39'; Van Hoevelen (red card) 45'; Gorius 52'	Attendance: 7,443; Referee: Frank De Bleeckere

27 August 2011 Matchday 5	Lokeren	0 – 1	Oud-Heverlee Leuven	Daknamstadion, Lokeren
20:00 CEST	Marić (yellow card) 22'; De Bock (yellow card) 29'; Harbaoui (yellow card) 51'; Persoons (red card) 79'	Report	Diandy (yellow card) 48'; Ogbu 90+2'	Attendance: 4,976; Referee: Gerd Bylois

10 September 2011 Matchday 6	Oud-Heverlee Leuven	3 – 1	Mons	Den Dreef, Heverlee
20:00 CEST	Remacle 21' (pen.); Ruytinx (yellow card) 66'; Ogbu 71', 84'; Geraerts (yellow card) 90+1'	Report	Nicaise (yellow card) 19'; Franquart (yellow card) 20'; Monteyne (yellow card) 28'; Ibou (yellow card) 35'; Ibou (yellow card) 35' (yellow-red card); Matumona 49'; Lépicier (yellow card) 66'; Perbet (yellow card) 90+4'	Attendance: 5,672; Referee: Gert Deckers

17 September 2011 Matchday 7	Kortrijk	2 – 0	Oud-Heverlee Leuven	Guldensporen Stadion, Kortrijk
20:00 CEST	Oussalah 5'; Capon 23'; Messoudi (red card) 57'	Report	Raymaekers (yellow card) 16'; Ruytinx (yellow card) 39'; N'Galula (yellow card) 81'; Annys (yellow card) 88'	Attendance: 6,157; Referee: Jimmy Verhe

24 September 2011 Matchday 8	Oud-Heverlee Leuven	1 – 1	Genk	Den Dreef, Heverlee
20:00 CEST	Ruytinx (yellow card) 52'; Hayen 65'	Report	Kennedy (yellow card) 38'; Vossen 45+2'; Barda (red card) 55'; Anele (yellow card) 90+2'	Attendance: 7,068; Referee: Frederik Geldhof

1 October 2011 Matchday 9	Gent	6 – 1	Oud-Heverlee Leuven	Jules Ottenstadion, Ghent
20:00 CEST	Ljubijankič 29', 63'; Arzo 48'; Smolders 72'; Coulibaly 90+1' (pen.); Soumahoro 90+2'	Report	Remacle 42'; Remacle (yellow card) 56'	Attendance: 10,757; Referee: Christophe Delacour

15 October 2011 Matchday 10	Oud-Heverlee Leuven	1 – 1	Westerlo	Den Dreef, Heverlee
20:00 CEST	Remacle (yellow card) 45+2'; Ogbu 72'	Report	Ngolok 23'; Ngolok (yellow card) 74'; De Petter (yellow card) 84'	Attendance: 6,860; Referee: Joeri Van De Velde

22 October 2011 Matchday 11	Cercle Brugge	2 – 0	Oud-Heverlee Leuven	Jan Breydel Stadium, Bruges
20:00 CEST	Janssens 41'; Vetokele (yellow card) 60'; Van Eenoo 67'; Iachtchouk (yellow card) 84'	Report	Annys (yellow card) 38'	Attendance: 8,104; Referee: Luc Wouters

29 October 2011 Matchday 12	Oud-Heverlee Leuven	3 – 2	Beerschot	Den Dreef, Heverlee
20:00 CEST	Ogbu 12'; Ruytinx 58'; Annys (yellow card) 72'; Geraerts (yellow card) 72'; Boi (yellow card) 77'; Geraerts 87'; Ruytinx (yellow card) 90'	Report	Porokara 62'; Kagelmacher 73' (pen.); MacDonald (yellow card) 85'; Kagelmacher (yellow card) 90+2'	Attendance: 7,122; Referee: Tom Ottevaere

5 November 2011 Matchday 13	Lierse	3 – 1	Oud-Heverlee Leuven	Herman Vanderpoortenstadion, Lier
20:00 CET	Claasen 19', 27'; Vandooren (yellow card) 43'; Grnčarov 52'; Claasen (yellow card) 62'	Report	Ogbu (yellow card) 15'; Annys (yellow card) 51'; Ogbu 54'; N'Galula (yellow card) 64'	Attendance: 8,500; Referee: Frank De Bleeckere

18 November 2011 Matchday 14	Oud-Heverlee Leuven	1 – 3	Standard Liège	Den Dreef, Heverlee
20:30 CET	Van Damme 34' (o.g.); Gendarme (yellow card) 87'; Remacle (yellow card) 90+1'	Report	Tchité 14', 28'; Vainqueur (yellow card) 21'; Cyriac (yellow card) 42'; Mujangi Bia 45+3'; Seijas (yellow card) 70'	Attendance: 8,519; Referee: Claude Bourdouxhe

26 November 2011 Matchday 15	Sint-Truiden	2 – 1	Oud-Heverlee Leuven	Staaienveld, Sint-Truiden
20:00 CET	Dufer 7'; Daeseleire (yellow card) 28'; Deferm (yellow card) 51'; Ghoochannejhad 56' (pen.); Verhulst (yellow card) 85'	Report	Annys (yellow card) 36'; Diandy (yellow card) 55'; Boi (yellow card) 70'; Geraerts 76'	Attendance: 9,623; Referee: Christophe Delacour

4 December 2011 Matchday 16	Anderlecht	0 – 0	Oud-Heverlee Leuven	Constant Vanden Stock Stadium, Anderlecht
14:30 CET	Juhász (red card) 79'; Proto (yellow card) 80'; Yakovenko (yellow card) 89'; Kljestan (yellow card) 90+4'	Report	Raymaekers (yellow card) 15'; N'Galula (yellow card) 59'; Weuts (yellow card) 87'	Attendance: 22,302; Referee: Frederik Geldhof

10 December 2011 Matchday 17	Oud-Heverlee Leuven	2 – 2	Zulte Waregem	Den Dreef, Heverlee
20:00 CET	Ruytinx 49'; Boi (yellow card) 52'; Ruytinx (yellow card) 61'; Remacle 86' (pen.)	Report	Dachelet (yellow card) 45+1'; Delaplace 65'; Trajkovski 72'; Skúlason (yellow card) 86'	Attendance: 7,426; Referee: Serdar Gözübüyük

18 December 2011 Matchday 18	Oud-Heverlee Leuven	3 – 1	Club Brugge	Den Dreef, Heverlee
18:00 CET	Annys (yellow card) 61'; Ruytinx 53'; Boi 73', 90+2'; Ruytinx (yellow card) 76'	Report	Høgli (yellow card) 13'; Jorgačević (yellow card) 34'; Refaelov (yellow card) 45+1'; Odjidja-Ofoe (red card) 45+1'; Akpala 55'; Zimling (yellow card) 60'; Donk (yellow card) 89'	Attendance: 8,519; Referee: Claude Bourdouxhe

26 December 2011 Matchday 19	KV Mechelen	2 – 2	Oud-Heverlee Leuven	Argosstadion Achter de Kazerne, Mechelen
20:30 CET	Destorme 30', 73'; De Witte (yellow card) 43'; Destorme (yellow card) 63'; Ruiz (yellow card) 78'	Report	Vermeulen (yellow card) 6'; Remacle 14'; Raymaekers (yellow card) 15'; Dejmek (yellow card) 27'; Ruytinx (yellow card) 29'; Ogbu 47'; Geraerts (yellow card) 56'; Gendarme (red card) 59'; Kaminski (yellow card) 90+3'	Attendance: 12,700; Referee: Laurent Colemonts

14 January 2012 Matchday 20	Oud-Heverlee Leuven	1 – 1	Lokeren	Den Dreef, Heverlee
20:00 CET	Gíslason (yellow card) 41'; Annys (yellow card) 56'; Boi (yellow card) 63'; De Vriese 81'	Report	Fevang (yellow card) 6'; De Pauw 45+2'; De Bock (yellow card) 80'; El Mouataz (yellow card) 88'; Lazić (yellow card) 90+7'; Galitsios (yellow card) 90+8'	Attendance: 7,013; Referee: Wim Smet

21 January 2012 Matchday 21	Mons	2 – 2	Oud-Heverlee Leuven	Stade Charles Tondreau, Mons
20:00 CET	Ibou (yellow card) 27'; Ibou 38'; Perbet 44'; Timmermans (red card) 86'	Report	Annys (yellow card) 25'; Vermeulen (yellow card) 36'; Remacle 61', 87' (pen.)	Attendance: 4,000; Referee: Tom Ottevaere

25 January 2012 Matchday 22	Oud-Heverlee Leuven	0 – 2	Kortrijk	Den Dreef, Heverlee
20:30 CET		Report	Nfor (yellow card) 33'; Veselinović 41'; Joseph-Monrose 74'	Attendance: 6,023; Referee: Jurgen Brinckman

28 January 2012 Matchday 23	Genk	5 – 0	Oud-Heverlee Leuven	Cristal Arena, Genk
20:00 CET	De Bruyne 15', 17'; Vossen 21'; Buffel 33'; Benteke 77'	Report	Dejmek (yellow card) 55'	Attendance: 23,439; Referee: Claude Bourdouxhe

4 February 2012 Matchday 24	Oud-Heverlee Leuven	2 – 3	Gent	Den Dreef, Heverlee
20:00 CET	Ogbu 26'; Geraerts 54'; Geraerts (yellow card) 90+3'	Report	Rafinha 45+3'; Melli 51'; Mboyo 58'; Mboyo (yellow card) 90+3'	Attendance: 7,070; Referee: Peter Vervecken

11 February 2012 Matchday 25	Westerlo	1 – 3	Oud-Heverlee Leuven	Het Kuipje, Westerlo
20:00 CET	Juande (yellow card) 34'; Reynaldo 44'; Ngolok (yellow card) 85'	Report	Iakovenko 34'; Annys (yellow card) 58'; Raymaekers 61'; Remacle 76'; Remacle (yellow card) 77'	Attendance: 6,000; Referee: Alexandre Boucaut

18 February 2012 Matchday 26	Oud-Heverlee Leuven	2 – 3	Cercle Brugge	Den Dreef, Heverlee
20:00 CET	Ogbu 19'; Dejmek 65'; Ruytinx (yellow card) 70'; Geraerts (yellow card) 79'	Report	Vetokele 21'; Mertens 57' (pen.); D'haene (yellow card) 75'; D'haene 81'; Viðarsson (yellow card) 88'; Viðarsson (yellow card) 90+2' (yellow-red card); Coppens (yellow card) 90+3'	Attendance: 7,338; Referee: Carlos-Manuel Alho Guerreiro

25 February 2012 Matchday 27	Beerschot	2 – 1	Oud-Heverlee Leuven	Olympisch Stadion, Antwerp
20:00 CET	MacDonald 26'; Nyoni (yellow card) 29'; Dayan 54'; Van Der Heyden (yellow card) 68'	Report	Raymaekers (yellow card) 22'; Dejmek 81'; Salou (yellow card) 90+3'	Attendance: 8,300; Referee: Serge Gumienny

3 March 2012 Matchday 28	Oud-Heverlee Leuven	0 – 0	Lierse	Den Dreef, Heverlee
20:00 CET	Diandy (yellow card) 45'; Remacle (yellow card) 77'	Report	Bidaoui (yellow card) 90+4'	Attendance: 7,495; Referee: Sam Loeman

18 March 2012 Matchday 29	Standard Liège	4 – 0	Oud-Heverlee Leuven	Stade Maurice Dufrasne, Liège
14:30 CET	Tchité 8'; Van Damme 53', 68'; Felipe 64'	Report	Geraerts (yellow card) 89'; Ruytinx (yellow card) 90+2'	Attendance: 23,000; Referee: Frederik Geldhof

21 March 2012 Matchday 30	Oud-Heverlee Leuven	3 – 1	Sint-Truiden	Den Dreef, Heverlee
20:30 CET	Boi 40'; Azevedo 88'; Brogno 90+2'	Report	Ghoochannejhad (yellow card) 34'; Euvrard (yellow card) 35'; Kotysch (yellow card) 55'; Rossini 73'	Attendance: 7,266; Referee: Gerd Bylois

31 March 2012 Playoff Matchday 1	Oud-Heverlee Leuven	1 – 1	Lierse	Den Dreef, Heverlee
20:00 CEST	Nys (yellow card) 62'; Ogbu 86'	Report	Ayew (yellow card) 56'; El-Gabbas 69' (pen.); Wils (yellow card) 83'	Attendance: 6,625; Referee: Joeri van de Velde

7 April 2012 Playoff Matchday 2	Cercle Brugge	6 – 4	Oud-Heverlee Leuven	Jan Breydel Stadium, Bruges
20:00 CEST	Rudy 13', 78'; Vetokele 16'; Carvalho 32'; Portier 47'; Iachtchouk 52'	Report	Gíslason 17'; Boi (yellow card) 37'; Remacle 37'; Azevedo 45+2'; Iakovenko 61'; Annys (yellow card) 65'; Ruytinx (yellow card) 67'	Attendance: 8,074; Referee: Laurent Colemonts

14 April 2012 Playoff Matchday 3	KV Mechelen	2 – 1	Oud-Heverlee Leuven	Argosstadion Achter de Kazerne, Mechelen
20:00 CEST	Van Tricht 15'; Ruiz 61'; Van Tricht (yellow card) 44'; Pandža (yellow card) 52'; Ghomsi (yellow card) 57'; Henkens (yellow card) 87'; De Witte (yellow card) 90+1'	Report	Weuts (yellow card) 34'; Remacle 53' (pen.); Raymaekers (yellow card) 71'; Dejmek (yellow card) 89'; Ruytinx (yellow card) 90+1'	Attendance: 9,975; Referee: Christof Virant

21 April 2012 Playoff Matchday 4	Oud-Heverlee Leuven	4 – 2	KV Mechelen	Den Dreef, Heverlee
17:30 CEST	Azevedo 7'; Nys 32'; Weuts (yellow card) 45+1'; Iakovenko 59'; Remacle 83' (pen.)	Report	Gorius 75'; Chen (yellow card) 83'; Gorius 90+3'	Attendance: 6,500; Referee: Jurgen Brinckman

28 April 2012 Playoff Matchday 5	Oud-Heverlee Leuven	3 – 2	Cercle Brugge	Den Dreef, Heverlee
20:00 CEST	Ruytinx (yellow card) 50'; Remacle 80' (pen.), 90+2'; Ruytinx 85'; Roelandts (yellow card) 88'	Report	Baldé 10', 20'; Van Eenoo (yellow card) 35'; Mertens (red card) 79'	Attendance: 7,563; Referee: Serge Gumienny

5 May 2012 Playoff Matchday 6	Lierse	1 – 2	Oud-Heverlee Leuven	Herman Vanderpoortenstadion, Lier
20:00 CEST	Bidaoui (yellow card) 45+2'; Adesanya 48'; Marić (yellow card) 90+1'	Report	Nys (yellow card) 4' (yellow-red card) 36'; Remacle 61'; Roelandts 85'	Attendance: 7,604; Referee: Tom Ottevaere

=== Belgian Cup ===
21 September 2011 6th round	Oud-Heverlee Leuven	1 – 2	Rupel Boom	Den Dreef, Heverlee
20:30 CET	Hayen (yellow card) 44'; Remacle (yellow card) 60'; Remacle 74' (pen.)	Report	Ventose 34' (pen.), 43' (pen.); Ventose (yellow card) 54'; Poorters (yellow card) 65'; Wauman (red card) 89'	Attendance: 1,500; Referee: Jurgen Brinckman
