= List of Belgian football transfers winter 2011–12 =

This is a list of Belgian football transfers for the 2011-12 winter transfer window. Only transfers involving a team from the Jupiler League are listed.

The winter transfer window opens on 1 January 2012, although a few transfers may take place prior to that date. The window closes at midnight on 1 February 2012. Players without a club may join one, either during or in between transfer windows.

== Sorted by date ==
=== November 2011 ===
| Date | Name | Moving from | Moving to | Fee |
|---|---|---|---|---|
| November 8, 2011 | (Serbia) Bojan Jorgačević | (Belgium) Gent | (Belgium) Club Brugge | Undisclosed |
| November 14, 2011 | (Belgium) Marvin Ogunjimi | (Belgium) Genk | (Spain) Mallorca | Undisclosed |
| November 25, 2011 | (Belgium) Bart Goor | (Belgium) Beerschot | (Belgium) Westerlo | Free |

=== December 2011 ===
| Date | Name | Moving from | Moving to | Fee | Note |
|---|---|---|---|---|---|
| December 11, 2011 | (Belgium) Andréa Mutombo | (Belgium) Standard Liège | (Belgium) Cercle Brugge | Free | |
| December 16, 2011 | (Sweden) Marcus Andreasson | (Belgium) Lierse | Free Agent | Released | |
| December 16, 2011 | (Greece) Georgios Galitsios | (Greece) Olympiacos | (Belgium) Lokeren | Undisclosed | |
| December 16, 2011 | (Venezuela) Jesús Gómez | (Belgium) Lierse | Free Agent | Released | |
| December 21, 2011 | (Brazil) Diogo | (Belgium) Anderlecht | (Brazil) São Paulo | Loan ended by mutual consent | |
| December 21, 2011 | (Peru) Hernán Hinostroza | (Peru) Alianza Lima | (Belgium) Zulte Waregem | Undisclosed | |
| December 22, 2011 | (Hungary) Péter Kovács | (Belgium) Lierse | Released per 1 January | Free Agent | |
| December 22, 2011 | (Brazil) Reynaldo | (Belgium) Anderlecht | (Belgium) Westerlo | Loan | |
| December 27, 2011 | (Belgium) Loris Brogno | (Belgium) Charleroi | (Belgium) OH Leuven | Undisclosed | |
| December 28, 2011 | (Sweden) Patrick Amoah | (Belgium) OH Leuven | (Belgium) WS Woluwe | Free | |
| December 29, 2011 | (Honduras) Víctor Bernárdez | (Belgium) Anderlecht | (United States) San Jose Earthquakes | Undisclosed | (Note: Bernárdez was on loan to Indios de Ciudad Juárez since the summer of 2011, but was now sold to San Jose Earthquakes.) |
| December 29, 2011 | (Netherlands) Tom Boere | (Netherlands) Ajax | (Belgium) Gent | Undisclosed | |
| December 30, 2011 | (Belgium) Jurgen Cavens | (Belgium) Lierse | (Belgium) Waasland-Beveren | Undisclosed | |

=== End of 2011 ===
Some players were on a loan which ended in 2011. As of 1 January 2012, they returned to their original club and are listed here. For a list of players on loan during the last year, see List of Belgian football transfers winter 2010–11 and summer 2011.

| Date | Name | Moving from | Moving to | Fee |
|---|---|---|---|---|
| End of 2011 | (Belgium) Jordan Garcia Calvete | (Belgium) Sint-Truiden | (Belgium) Anderlecht | Loan Return |
| End of 2011 | (Israel) Rami Gershon | (Belgium) Kortrijk | (Belgium) Standard Liège | Loan Return |
| End of 2011 | (Brazil) Renato Neto | (Belgium) Cercle Brugge | (Portugal) Sporting | Loan Return |

=== January 2012 ===
| Date | Name | Moving from | Moving to | Fee | Note |
|---|---|---|---|---|---|
| January 2, 2012 | (Belgium) Ziguy Badibanga | (Belgium) Anderlecht | (Netherlands) De Graafschap | Loan | |
| January 4, 2012 | (Portugal) William Carvalho | (Portugal) Sporting | (Belgium) Cercle Brugge | Loan | |
| January 4, 2012 | (Belgium) Geoffrey Hairemans | (Netherlands) De Graafschap | (Belgium) Lierse | Free | |
| January 4, 2012 | (South Africa) Lindani Ntamo | (Belgium) Beerschot | Free Agent | NA | |
| January 4, 2012 | (South Africa) Sive Phekezela | (Belgium) Beerschot | Free Agent | NA | |
| January 4, 2012 | (Czech Republic) Ondřej Smetana | (Belgium) Sint-Truiden | (Slovakia) Slovan Bratislava | Loan | |
| January 4, 2012 | (Slovenia) Marko Šuler | (Belgium) Gent | (Israel) Hapoel Tel Aviv | Loan | |
| January 5, 2012 | (Democratic Republic of the Congo) Patou Kabangu | (Democratic Republic of the Congo) TP Mazembe | (Belgium) Anderlecht | Undisclosed | |
| January 5, 2012 | (Czech Republic) Ondřej Mazuch | (Belgium) Anderlecht | (Ukraine) Dnipro Dnipropetrovsk | ± 3 000 000 € | |
| January 5, 2012 | (Democratic Republic of the Congo) Bedi Mbenza | (Democratic Republic of the Congo) TP Mazembe | (Belgium) Anderlecht | Undisclosed | |
| January 7, 2012 | (Brazil) Samuel | (Belgium) Anderlecht | Free Agent | NA | |
| January 10, 2012 | (Iceland) Stefán Gíslason | (Norway) Lillestrøm | (Belgium) OH Leuven | Free | |
| January 10, 2012 | (Ghana) Noel Nyason | (Belgium) Turnhout | (Belgium) Lierse | Undisclosed | |
| January 10, 2012 | (Czech Republic) Daniel Pudil | (Belgium) Genk | (Spain) Granada | Undisclosed | |
| January 10, 2012 | (Belgium) Katuku Tshimanga | (Belgium) Lokeren | (Belgium) Genk | ± 2 500 000 € | |
| January 11, 2012 | (Belgium) Logan Bailly | (Germany) Borussia Mönchengladbach | (Belgium) Genk | Loan | |
| January 11, 2012 | (Belgium) Dolly Menga | (Belgium) Standard Liège | (Belgium) Sint-Truiden | Loan | |
| January 11, 2012 | (Cameroon) Aloys Nong | (Belgium) Standard Liège | (Belgium) Mons | Undisclosed | |
| January 11, 2012 | (Belgium) Glenn Verbauwhede | Free Agent | (Belgium) Westerlo | NA | |
| January 12, 2012 | (Colombia) Carlos Bacca | (Colombia) Atlético Junior | (Belgium) Club Brugge | Undisclosed | |
| January 12, 2012 | (France) Franck Berrier | (Belgium) Standard Liège | (Belgium) Zulte Waregem | Undisclosed | |
| January 12, 2012 | (Senegal) Pape Camara | (Belgium) Standard Liège | (France) Valenciennes | Undisclosed | |
| January 13, 2012 | (Iceland) Birkir Bjarnason | (Norway) Viking | (Belgium) Standard Liège | Undisclosed | |
| January 16, 2012 | (Belgium) Jordan Garcia Calvete | (Belgium) Anderlecht | (Netherlands) De Graafschap | Loan | |
| January 16, 2012 | (France) Rémi Maréval | (Belgium) Zulte Waregem | (Belgium) Gent | Undisclosed | |
| January 18, 2012 | (Spain) Jordi Figueras | (Russia) Rubin Kazan | (Belgium) Club Brugge | Undisclosed | (Note: Figueras was on loan from Rubin Kazan to Rayo Vallecano, but was now sold to Club Brugge.) |
| January 19, 2012 | (Uruguay) Gary Kagelmacher | (Belgium) Beerschot | (France) AS Monaco | Undisclosed | |
| January 20, 2012 | (Ghana) Ibrahim Salou | (United States) New York Red Bulls | (Belgium) OH Leuven | Free | |
| January 22, 2012 | (Togo) Serge Gakpé | (France) Nantes | (Belgium) Standard Liège | Loan | |
| January 24, 2012 | (Poland) Grzegorz Sandomierski | (Belgium) Genk | (Poland) Jagiellonia Białystok | Loan | |
| January 25, 2012 | (The Gambia) Mustapha Jarju | (Canada) Vancouver Whitecaps | (Belgium) Mons | Undisclosed | |
| January 25, 2012 | (France) Alassane També | (France) Paris Saint-Germain | (Belgium) Kortrijk | Undisclosed | |
| January 26, 2012 | (Netherlands) Istvan Bakx | (Belgium) Genk | (Netherlands) Willem II | Free | |
| January 26, 2012 | (Ukraine) Sacha Iakovenko | (Belgium) Anderlecht | (Belgium) OH Leuven | Loan | |
| January 27, 2012 | (Angola) Sebastião Gilberto | (Belgium) Lierse | (Cyprus) Limassol | Undisclosed | |
| January 28, 2012 | (Bosnia and Herzegovina) Adnan Čustović | (Belgium) Beerschot | (Belgium) Mouscron-Péruwelz | Loan | |
| January 28, 2012 | (Netherlands) Michiel Hemmen | (Netherlands) AGOVV | (Belgium) Westerlo | Undisclosed | |
| January 28, 2012 | (Paraguay) Rodrigo Rojas | (Belgium) Beerschot | Free Agent | Released | |
| January 29, 2012 | (Norway) Mushaga Bakenga | (Norway) Rosenborg | (Belgium) Club Brugge | Undisclosed | |
| January 29, 2012 | (Belgium) Joeri Vastmans | (Belgium) OH Leuven | Free Agent | Released | |
| January 30, 2012 | (Belgium) Thomas Chatelle | (Belgium) Anderlecht | (Belgium) Sint-Truiden | Loan | |
| January 30, 2012 | (Senegal) Baye Djiby Fall | (Russia) Lokomotiv Moscow | (Belgium) Lokeren | Undisclosed | (Note: Djiby Fall was on loan from Lokomotiv Moscow to Odense BK, but was now sold to Lokeren.) |
| January 30, 2012 | (Senegal) Mbaye Leye | (Belgium) Standard Liège | (Belgium) Zulte Waregem | Undisclosed | |
| January 30, 2012 | (Germany) Felix Luz | Free Agent | (Belgium) Westerlo | NA | |
| January 31, 2012 | (France) Chakhir Belghazouani | (Ukraine) Dynamo Kyiv | (Belgium) Zulte Waregem | Undisclosed | |
| January 31, 2012 | (Belgium) Kevin De Bruyne | (Belgium) Genk | (England) Chelsea | ± 8 000 000 € | (Note: As part of the agreement between Chelsea and Genk, De Bruyne will play the remainder of the season for Genk on loan from Chelsea. Also, based on performances, the fee could increase by another 1 500 000 €) |
| January 31, 2012 | (Morocco) Nabil Dirar | (Belgium) Club Brugge | (France) AS Monaco | €6–7.5m | |
| January 31, 2012 | (United States) Mikkel Diskerud | (Norway) Stabæk | (Belgium) Gent | Loan | |
| January 31, 2012 | (Nigeria) Imoh Ezekiel | (Nigeria) 36 Lions FC | (Belgium) Standard Liège | Loan | |
| January 31, 2012 | (Bosnia and Herzegovina) Irfan Hadžić | (Belgium) Zulte Waregem | (Netherlands) Vitesse Arnhem | Undisclosed | |
| January 31, 2012 | (Belgium) Nathan Kabasele | (Belgium) Anderlecht | (Belgium) Westerlo | Loan | |
| January 31, 2012 | (Belgium) Leroy Labylle | (Belgium) Standard Liège | (Netherlands) MVV | Loan | |
| January 31, 2012 | (Niger) Ouwo Moussa Maazou | (Belgium) Zulte Waregem | (Russia) CSKA Moscow | Loan Terminated | (Note: Maazou was on loan from CSKA Moscow to Zulte Waregem, the loan was terminated and he was immediately loaned out to Le Mans) |
| January 31, 2012 | (Democratic Republic of the Congo) Freddy Mombongo-Dues | (Belgium) Mons | (Belgium) Antwerp | Undisclosed | |
| January 31, 2012 | (Belgium) Giuseppe Rossini | (Belgium) Zulte Waregem | (Belgium) Sint-Truiden | Loan | |
| January 31, 2012 | (Belgium) Tail Schoonjans | (Belgium) OH Leuven | (Belgium) Sint-Niklaas | Loan | |
| January 31, 2012 | (Senegal) Ibrahima Sidibe | (Belgium) Beerschot | (Belgium) Westerlo | Undisclosed | |
| January 31, 2012 | (Belgium) Joris Van Hout | (Belgium) Westerlo | (Belgium) Dessel Sport | Loan | |

=== February 2012 ===
| Date | Name | Moving from | Moving to | Fee | Note |
|---|---|---|---|---|---|
| February 1, 2012 | (Serbia) Luka Milunović | (Belgium) Zulte Waregem | (Serbia) Red Star Belgrade | Free | |
| February 3, 2012 | (Croatia) Dino Škvorc | Free Agent | (Belgium) Mechelen | NA | |

== Sorted by team ==
=== Anderlecht ===
In:

| No. | Pos. | Nation | Player |
|---|---|---|---|
| 6 | MF | COD | Bedi Mbenza (from (Democratic Republic of the Congo) TP Mazembe) |
| 14 | FW | COD | Patou Kabangu (from (Democratic Republic of the Congo) TP Mazembe) |

Out:

| No. | Pos. | Nation | Player |
|---|---|---|---|
| 2 | DF | CZE | Ondřej Mazuch (to (Ukraine) Dnipro Dnipropetrovsk) |
| 6 | DF | BRA | Diogo (contract annulled, returned to (Brazil) São Paulo) |
| 12 | MF | BEL | Thomas Chatelle (on loan to (Belgium) Sint-Truiden) |
| 17 | MF | UKR | Sacha Iakovenko (on loan to (Belgium) OH Leuven) |
| 26 | DF | HON | Víctor Bernárdez (was on loan to (Mexico) Indios de Ciudad Juárez, now sold to (United States) San Jose Earthquakes) |
| 36 | FW | BEL | Nathan Kabasele (on loan to (Belgium) Westerlo) |
| 39 | MF | BEL | Ziguy Badibanga (on loan to (Netherlands) De Graafschap) |
| 44 | DF | BRA | Samuel (released) |
| 77 | MF | BRA | Reynaldo (on loan to (Belgium) Westerlo) |
| — | MF | BEL | Jordan Garcia Calvete (on loan to (Netherlands) De Graafschap) |

=== Beerschot ===
In:

| No. | Pos. | Nation | Player |

Out:

| No. | Pos. | Nation | Player |
|---|---|---|---|
| 4 | DF | URU | Gary Kagelmacher (to (France) AS Monaco) |
| 7 | FW | BIH | Adnan Čustović (on loan to (Belgium) Mouscron-Péruwelz) |
| 10 | FW | SEN | Ibrahima Sidibe (to (Belgium) Westerlo) |
| 16 | MF | PAR | Rodrigo Rojas (released) |
| 22 | MF | RSA | Lindani Ntamo (released) |
| 27 | DF | RSA | Sive Phekezela (released) |
| 44 | MF | BEL | Bart Goor (to (Belgium) Westerlo) |

=== Cercle Brugge ===
In:

| No. | Pos. | Nation | Player |
|---|---|---|---|
| — | MF | POR | William Carvalho (on loan from (Portugal) Sporting) |
| — | FW | BEL | Andréa Mutombo (from (Belgium) Standard Liège) |

Out:

| No. | Pos. | Nation | Player |
|---|---|---|---|
| 21 | MF | BRA | Renato Neto (loan return to (Portugal) Sporting) |

=== Club Brugge ===
In:

| No. | Pos. | Nation | Player |
|---|---|---|---|
| 7 | FW | COL | Carlos Bacca (from (Colombia) Atlético Junior) |
| 22 | DF | ESP | Jordi Figueras (from (Russia) Rubin Kazan) |
| 39 | GK | SRB | Bojan Jorgačević (from (Belgium) Gent) |
| — | FW | NOR | Mushaga Bakenga (from (Norway) Rosenborg) |

Out:

| No. | Pos. | Nation | Player |
|---|---|---|---|
| 10 | MF | MAR | Nabil Dirar (to (France) AS Monaco) |

=== Genk ===
Note: midfielder (Belgium) Kevin De Bruyne signed for (England) Chelsea, but will stay on loan for the remainder of the season.

In:

| No. | Pos. | Nation | Player |
|---|---|---|---|
| 3 | DF | BEL | Katuku Tshimanga (from (Belgium) Lokeren) |
| 23 | GK | BEL | Logan Bailly (on loan from (Germany) Borussia Mönchengladbach) |

Out:

| No. | Pos. | Nation | Player |
|---|---|---|---|
| 1 | GK | POL | Grzegorz Sandomierski (on loan to (Poland) Jagiellonia Białystok) |
| 11 | FW | NED | Istvan Bakx (to (Netherlands) Willem II) |
| 31 | FW | BEL | Marvin Ogunjimi (to (Spain) Mallorca) |
| 33 | DF | CZE | Daniel Pudil (to (Spain) Granada) |

=== Gent ===
In:

| No. | Pos. | Nation | Player |
|---|---|---|---|
| — | FW | NED | Tom Boere (from (Netherlands) Ajax) |
| — | MF | USA | Mikkel Diskerud (on loan from (Norway) Stabæk) |
| — | DF | FRA | Rémi Maréval (from (Belgium) Zulte Waregem) |

Out:

| No. | Pos. | Nation | Player |
|---|---|---|---|
| 3 | DF | SLO | Marko Šuler (on loan to (Israel) Hapoel Tel Aviv) |
| 29 | GK | SRB | Bojan Jorgačević (to (Belgium) Club Brugge) |

=== Kortrijk ===
In:

| No. | Pos. | Nation | Player |
|---|---|---|---|
| — | DF | FRA | Alassane També (from (France) Paris Saint-Germain) |

Out:

| No. | Pos. | Nation | Player |
|---|---|---|---|
| 5 | DF | ISR | Rami Gershon (loan return to (Belgium) Standard Liège) |

=== Lierse ===
In:

| No. | Pos. | Nation | Player |
|---|---|---|---|
| — | MF | BEL | Geoffrey Hairemans (from (Netherlands) De Graafschap) |
| — | FW | GHA | Noel Nyason (from (Belgium) Turnhout) |

Out:

| No. | Pos. | Nation | Player |
|---|---|---|---|
| 9 | FW | BEL | Jurgen Cavens (to (Belgium) Waasland-Beveren) |
| 12 | MF | ANG | Sebastião Gilberto (to (Cyprus) Limassol) |
| 20 | FW | VEN | Jesús Gómez (released) |
| 25 | DF | SWE | Marcus Andreasson (released) |
| 39 | FW | HUN | Péter Kovács (released) |

=== Lokeren ===
In:

| No. | Pos. | Nation | Player |
|---|---|---|---|
| 13 | DF | GRE | Georgios Galitsios (from (Greece) Olympiacos) |
| — | FW | SEN | Baye Djiby Fall (from (Russia) Lokomotiv Moscow) |

Out:

| No. | Pos. | Nation | Player |
|---|---|---|---|
| 15 | DF | BEL | Katuku Tshimanga (to (Belgium) Genk) |

=== Mechelen ===
In:

| No. | Pos. | Nation | Player |
|---|---|---|---|
| — | DF | CRO | Dino Škvorc (free agent) |

Out:

| No. | Pos. | Nation | Player |

=== Mons ===
In:

| No. | Pos. | Nation | Player |
|---|---|---|---|
| 22 | FW | GAM | Mustapha Jarju (from (Canada) Vancouver Whitecaps) |
| 72 | FW | CMR | Aloys Nong (from (Belgium) Standard Liège) |

Out:

| No. | Pos. | Nation | Player |
|---|---|---|---|
| 9 | FW | COD | Freddy Mombongo-Dues (to (Belgium) Antwerp) |

=== OH Leuven ===
In:

| No. | Pos. | Nation | Player |
|---|---|---|---|
| 9 | FW | GHA | Ibrahim Salou (from (United States) New York Red Bulls) |
| 11 | MF | UKR | Sacha Iakovenko (on loan from (Belgium) Anderlecht) |
| 19 | FW | BEL | Loris Brogno (from (Belgium) Charleroi) |
| 27 | DF | ISL | Stefán Gíslason (from (Norway) Lillestrøm) |

Out:

| No. | Pos. | Nation | Player |
|---|---|---|---|
| 5 | DF | BEL | Joeri Vastmans (released) |
| 9 | FW | SWE | Patrick Amoah (to (Belgium) WS Woluwe) |
| 11 | MF | BEL | Tail Schoonjans (on loan to (Belgium) Sint-Niklaas) |

=== Sint-Truiden ===
In:

| No. | Pos. | Nation | Player |
|---|---|---|---|
| 9 | FW | BEL | Dolly Menga (on loan from (Belgium) Standard Liège) |
| — | MF | BEL | Thomas Chatelle (on loan from (Belgium) Anderlecht) |
| — | FW | BEL | Giuseppe Rossini (on loan from (Belgium) Zulte Waregem) |

Out:

| No. | Pos. | Nation | Player |
|---|---|---|---|
| 19 | FW | CZE | Ondřej Smetana (on loan to (Slovakia) Slovan Bratislava) |
| — | MF | BEL | Jordan Garcia Calvete (loan return to (Belgium) Anderlecht) |

=== Standard Liège ===
In:

| No. | Pos. | Nation | Player |
|---|---|---|---|
| 7 | MF | ISL | Birkir Bjarnason (from (Norway) Viking) |
| 55 | DF | ISR | Rami Gershon (loan return from (Belgium) Kortrijk) |
| 77 | FW | TOG | Serge Gakpé (on loan from (France) Nantes) |
| — | MF | NGR | Imoh Ezekiel (on loan from (Nigeria) 36 Lions FC) |

Out:

| No. | Pos. | Nation | Player |
|---|---|---|---|
| 7 | MF | FRA | Franck Berrier (to (Belgium) Zulte Waregem) |
| 13 | FW | CMR | Aloys Nong (to (Belgium) Mons) |
| 34 | FW | SEN | Pape Camara (to (France) Valenciennes) |
| 47 | FW | BEL | Dolly Menga (on loan to (Belgium) Sint-Truiden) |
| 99 | FW | SEN | Mbaye Leye (to (Belgium) Zulte Waregem) |
| — | MF | BEL | Leroy Labylle (on loan to (Netherlands) MVV) |
| — | FW | BEL | Andréa Mutombo (to (Belgium) Cercle Brugge) |

=== Westerlo ===
In:

| No. | Pos. | Nation | Player |
|---|---|---|---|
| 13 | GK | BEL | Glenn Verbauwhede (signed as free agent) |
| 21 | MF | BRA | Reynaldo (on loan from (Belgium) Anderlecht) |
| 44 | MF | BEL | Bart Goor (from (Belgium) Beerschot) |
| — | FW | NED | Michiel Hemmen (from (Netherlands) AGOVV) |
| — | FW | BEL | Nathan Kabasele (on loan from (Belgium) Anderlecht) |
| — | FW | GER | Felix Luz (free agent) |
| — | FW | SEN | Ibrahima Sidibe (from (Belgium) Beerschot) |

Out:

| No. | Pos. | Nation | Player |
|---|---|---|---|
| 16 | FW | BEL | Joris Van Hout (on loan to (Belgium) Dessel Sport) |

=== Zulte Waregem ===
In:

| No. | Pos. | Nation | Player |
|---|---|---|---|
| 14 | MF | PER | Hernán Hinostroza (from (Peru) Alianza Lima) |
| — | MF | FRA | Chakhir Belghazouani (from (Ukraine) Dynamo Kyiv) |
| — | MF | FRA | Franck Berrier (from (Belgium) Standard Liège) |
| — | FW | SEN | Mbaye Leye (from (Belgium) Standard Liège) |

Out:

| No. | Pos. | Nation | Player |
|---|---|---|---|
| 5 | DF | FRA | Rémi Maréval (to (Belgium) Gent) |
| 19 | FW | BEL | Giuseppe Rossini (on loan to (Belgium) Sint-Truiden) |
| — | FW | BIH | Irfan Hadžić (to (Netherlands) Vitesse Arnhem) |
| — | FW | NIG | Ouwo Moussa Maazou (loan return to (Russia) CSKA Moscow) |
| — | FW | SRB | Luka Milunović (to (Serbia) Red Star Belgrade) |
