= Tail Schoonjans =

Belgian footballer

Personal information
- Full name: Tail Schoonjans
- Date of birth: 19 August 1986 (age 40)
- Place of birth: Brussels, Belgium
- Position: Forward

Youth career
- 1992–2002: Stade Leuven

Senior career*
Years	Team	Apps	(Gls)
2002–2012	OH Leuven	150	(18)
2012	→ Sint-Niklaas (loan)	7	(3)
2012–2014	Sint-Niklaas	41	(4)
2014–2015	Bornem	24	(3)
2015–2017	Grimbergen	13	(0)
- * Club domestic league appearances and goals as of 2 January 2016

Tail Schoonjans (born 19 August 1986) is a retired Belgian professional footballer, who last played for Grimbergen in the Belgian Third Division.

== Career ==
Schoonjans started his youth career with Stade Leuven, before it merged into OH Leuven in 2002. With OH Leuven, he promoted up two levels from the Belgian Third Division to the Belgian Pro League as the club got promoted in 2005 and 2011. In these ten years, he featured in 150 matches for OH Leuven, scoring 18 goals in the process. During the first half of the 2011-12 season however, he was surpassed by Bjorn Ruytinx and Derick Ogbu, only allowing him to make three substitute appearances, of which one was in the Belgian Cup. He was loaned out for six months to Belgian Second Division team Sint-Niklaas during the winter 2011–12 transfer window, but released upon return. He subsequently signed a full contract with Sint-Niklaas.
