= Van Tricht =

Van Tricht is a Dutch surname. Notable people with the surname include:

- Aert van Tricht, Dutch sculptor
- Käte van Tricht (1909–1996), German musician
- Wannes Van Tricht (born 1993), Belgian footballer
