= Joeri Vastmans =

Belgian footballer

Personal information
- Full name: Joeri Vastmans
- Date of birth: 5 December 1983 (age 42)
- Place of birth: Bree, Belgium
- Position: Wing-back

Team information
- Current team: Bocholt

Senior career*
Years	Team	Apps	(Gls)
2003–2005	Patro Maasmechelen	61	(2)
2005–2011	OH Leuven	172	(2)
2012–2015	Patro Eisden Maasmechelen	10	(0)
2015–2016	Bocholt	0	(0)
- * Club domestic league appearances and goals as of 22 November 2012

Joeri Vastmans (born 5 December 1983) is a retired Belgian professional footballer, who last played for Bocholt.

Vastmans started career with Patro Maasmechelen in the Belgian Second Division in 2003. After the 2004–05 season Maasmechelen was relegated two levels to the Belgian Promotion following financial difficulties. As a result, Vastmans chose to leave the team and signed for OH Leuven, who had just gained promotion into the Second Division. At OH Leuven, Vastmans quickly grew out to become a regular, seldom missing a match. As of 2012, he is still the player with the second most matches for OH Leuven, with only Bjorn Ruytinx having played more. Early through the 2010–11 season, Vastmans suffered a severe leg fracture, causing him to be sidelined for almost the whole season, only playing 20 minutes in the final match. From the sidelines, he saw the team win promotion to the Belgian Pro League. Although completely fit, Vastmans never regained his status of first team regular and only played in one match at the highest level, at home against Club Brugge when he came on in injury time. Due to lack of playing time, Vastmans was allowed to leave during the 2011–12 winter transfer window. He opted to join his former team, in the meantime renamed to Patro Eisden Maasmechelen and playing in the Belgian Third Division. He stayed at Patro Eisden Maasmechelen until the end of the 2014–15 season before leaving for Bocholt. Following a tragic accident in which his brother died, Vastmans decided to retire from football in August 2016.

In June 2012, following the 10th anniversary of the founding of Oud-Heverlee Leuven, the "Oud-Heverlee Leuven Merit Award" was handed out to the player with the most merit for the team in the inaugural 10 years. Vastmans was voted into fourth place by the supporters, only being beaten by François Sterchele, Bjorn Ruytinx and Jordan Remacle.
