= Kenneth Van Goethem =

Belgian footballer

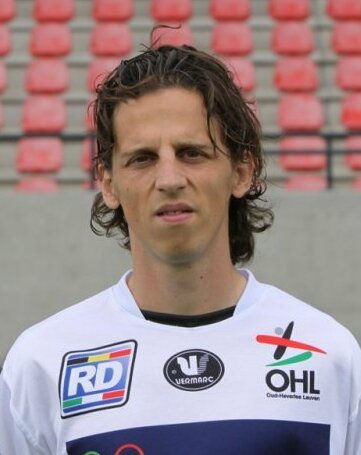

Personal information
- Date of birth: 13 February 1984 (age 42)
- Place of birth: Aarschot, Belgium
- Height: 1.79 m (5 ft 10 in)
- Position: Midfielder

Team information
- Current team: Heist (on loan from OH Leuven)
- Number: 16

Youth career
- 1992–1999: Diest
- 1999–2003: Genk

Senior career*
Years	Team	Apps	(Gls)
2003–2006	Genk	18	(0)
2007–2010	Mechelen	84	(1)
2010–2016	OH Leuven	116	(3)
2015–2016	→ Heist (loan)	16	(2)
2016–	Aarschot	0	(0)
- * Club domestic league appearances and goals as of 28 December 2015

Kenneth Van Goethem (born 13 February 1984) is a Belgian footballer who plays for Heist, on loan from OH Leuven. In March 2016, the news was announced Van Goethem would move to SC Aarschot playing the Belgian Provincial leagues from the 2016–17 season.

== Career ==
Via Diest, Van Goethem arrived at the youth team of Genk, where he was awarded a professional contract in 2002. At Genk, he played only a few matches, most as a substitute and only seldom as a starting player. Eventually he played only 18 matches in almost four seasons. During the winter transfer period of the 2006–07 season, he moved to Belgian Second Division team Mechelen with which he enjoyed promoted back to the highest level of Belgian football. Towards the end of the 2009-10 he was told his contract would not be prolonged and he moved as a free player to OH Leuven during the 2010 summer transfer window, making it his second move to the Second Division. But again, he enjoyed promotion, leading the team to the title during the 2010–11 season. During the first match of the 2011-12 season, he picked up a severe knee injury, causing him to be sidelined for most of the season. At the end of the summer 2015 transfer period, Van Goethem was loaned to Belgian Second Division team Heist.
