= Salou Ibrahim =

Ghanaian footballer

Personal information
- Full name: Salou Ibrahim
- Date of birth: 29 May 1979 (age 47)
- Place of birth: Kumasi, Ghana
- Height: 1.95 m (6 ft 5 in)
- Position: Forward

Team information
- Current team: Hoboken

Youth career
- 1996–1998: King Faisal Babes

Senior career*
Years	Team	Apps	(Gls)
1998–1999	Wandsbek 81		
2000–2004	Turnhout	50	(29)
2004–2005	Kortrijk	28	(10)
2005–2006	Zulte Waregem	29	(9)
2006–2008	Club Brugge	46	(5)
2008–2009	MSV Duisburg	6	(0)
2009–2010	Vejle	18	(3)
2010–2011	New York Red Bulls	19	(3)
2012	OH Leuven	9	(0)
2012–2013	La Louvière Centre	15	(8)
2013–2014	Hoogstraten	2	(0)
2015–2016	Destelbergen		
2016–	Hoboken		
- * Club domestic league appearances and goals as of 29 May 2014

Salou Ibrahim (also sometimes known as Ibrahim Salou; born 29 May 1979 in Kumasi) is a Ghanaian footballer currently with Hoboken playing in the Belgian Provincial leagues.

== Club career ==
=== Early career ===
Salou started to play for King Faisal Babes, a Ghanaian football club based in the Ashanti city of Kumasi. After two seasons, he was signed by German club TuS Wandsbek 81.

=== Belgium ===
In 2000, he signed for FC Turnhout in Belgium, where he stayed for four seasons. During the 2003–04 season, Salou scored 16 goals in 26 appearances for FC Turnhout and began to draw attention from higher-level clubs.

In 2004, he signed for KV Kortrijk, that started his first season in the Belgian Second Division. After one season he went to S.V. Zulte-Waregem in the Belgian First Division and scored nine goals in 29 league appearances (14 goals in all competitions), helping his side capture the 2006 Belgian Cup.

As a result of his play with Zulte-Waregem, Salou received offers from the top two sides in Belgian football RSC Anderlecht and Club Brugge as well as other European sides including AEK Athens and RC Lens. He decided on Club Brugge and joined the club in 2006. On 2 November 2006, Salou scored his clubs lone goal in a 3–1 loss to Premier League club Tottenham in a UEFA Cup match played at White Hart Lane. In two seasons with the club, Salou appeared in 46 Belgian First Division matches scoring five goals. He also helped the club capture the 2006–07 Belgian Cup. There he also stayed for two seasons before returning to Germany.

=== MSV Duisburg ===
In 2008, he moved to MSV Duisburg. Prior to joining Duisburg, Salou was close to signing with FC Rapid București. On 8 August 2010, Salou scored eleven minutes into his debut with MSV Duisburg in a DFB-Pokal match against ASV Bergedorf that ended in a 5–1 victory.

=== Vejle ===
After only six months in Duisburg, Salou signed with Vejle Boldklub. On 1 March 2009, Salou scored his first goal in the Danish Superliga in a 1–1 draw with AGF Aarhus. During his time at the club Salou appeared in 20 official matches and scored 4 goals.

=== New York Red Bulls ===
Salou went on trial for New York Red Bulls in Major League Soccer during March 2010. On 20 March 2010, Salou started and played 67 minutes for Red Bulls in a 3–1 victory against Santos FC, which was the first match played at the new Red Bull Arena. After impressing during his trial spell, Salou was signed on 23 March 2010 by New York Red Bulls. On 24 April 2010, Salou scored his first league goal for New York in a 2–1 victory over Philadelphia Union. On 21 October 2010, Salou started and played a full 90 minutes for Red Bulls in a 2–0 victory over New England Revolution helping his side clinch the regular season Eastern Conference title.

Salou began the 2011 season with New York but was waived on 21 March 2011, two days after the club's first match of the season.

=== Return to Belgium ===
Salou returned to Belgium in the beginning of 2012, signing for newly promoted Oud-Heverlee Leuven on 20 January 2012. Although mostly as a substitute, he played in 9 matches for OHL during the second half of the 2011–12 season, but failed to get on the score sheet in the process. At the end of the season, he was released.

Salou signed with La Louvière Centre in July 2012. After one season there, Salou signed with Hoogstraten in July 2013.

In November 2014 Salou signed with Destelbergen.

== International career ==
Salou was born in Ghana, but received his Belgian nationality in 2005. Following a successful campaign with S.V. Zulte-Waregem during the 2005–06 season, Salou started to garner interest from the Belgium national football team. After deciding to represent his native country, in 2006 Salou was called up for Ghana but decided not to join the national side due to a dispute involving obtaining his visa. Coach Claude Le Roy made efforts to persuade him to join the Black Stars, but Salou declined.

== Honours ==
=== Club ===
- S.V. Zulte-Waregem
  - Belgian Cup: 2005–06
- Club Brugge
  - Belgian Cup: 2006–07
