= Jorn Vermeulen =

Belgian footballer

Personal information
- Date of birth: 16 April 1987 (age 39)
- Place of birth: Torhout, Belgium
- Height: 1.85 m (6 ft 1 in)
- Position: Defender

Team information
- Current team: Nieuwpoort

Youth career
- 1993–2006: Club Brugge

Senior career*
Years	Team	Apps	(Gls)
2006–2011	Club Brugge	33	(0)
2011–2013	OH Leuven	25	(0)
2012–2013	→ Antwerp (loan)	28	(0)
2013–2015	Waasland-Beveren	19	(0)
2015–2016	Deinze	12	(2)
2016–2018	Izegem	0	(0)
2018–2019	Oostkamp	0	(0)
2019–	Nieuwpoort	0	(0)

International career^{‡}
2002–2003	Belgium U16	10	(2)
2003–2004	Belgium U17	11	(2)
2005	Belgium U18	6	(0)
2005–2006	Belgium U19	19	(4)
2007	Belgium U20	1	(0)
2007	Belgium U21	2	(0)
- * Club domestic league appearances and goals as of 26 December 2015 ‡ National team caps and goals as of 14 December 2013

Jorn Vermeulen (born 16 April 1987 in Torhout) is a Belgian football player who played for the national youth teams, played for 10 seasons for teams at the highest two levels of the Belgian football league system, and has semi-retired, currently playing for Nieuwpoort in the amateur Belgian Provincial Leagues.

== Career ==
Vermeulen, a defender, began his youth career in 1993 with Club Brugge. During his junior career, Vermeulen played, in progressive years, for each of the Belgium national youth teams: Belgium U16, Belgium U17, Belgium U18, Belgium U19, Belgium U20 and Belgium U21.

Vermeulen was promoted to Club Brugge's Jupiler League team, at the top of the Belgian football league system, for the 2006–07 season.

== Honours ==
Club Brugge

- Belgian Cup: 2006–07
