= Wijgmaal =

Sub-municipality of the city of Leuven, Belgium

- Sub-municipality of Leuven
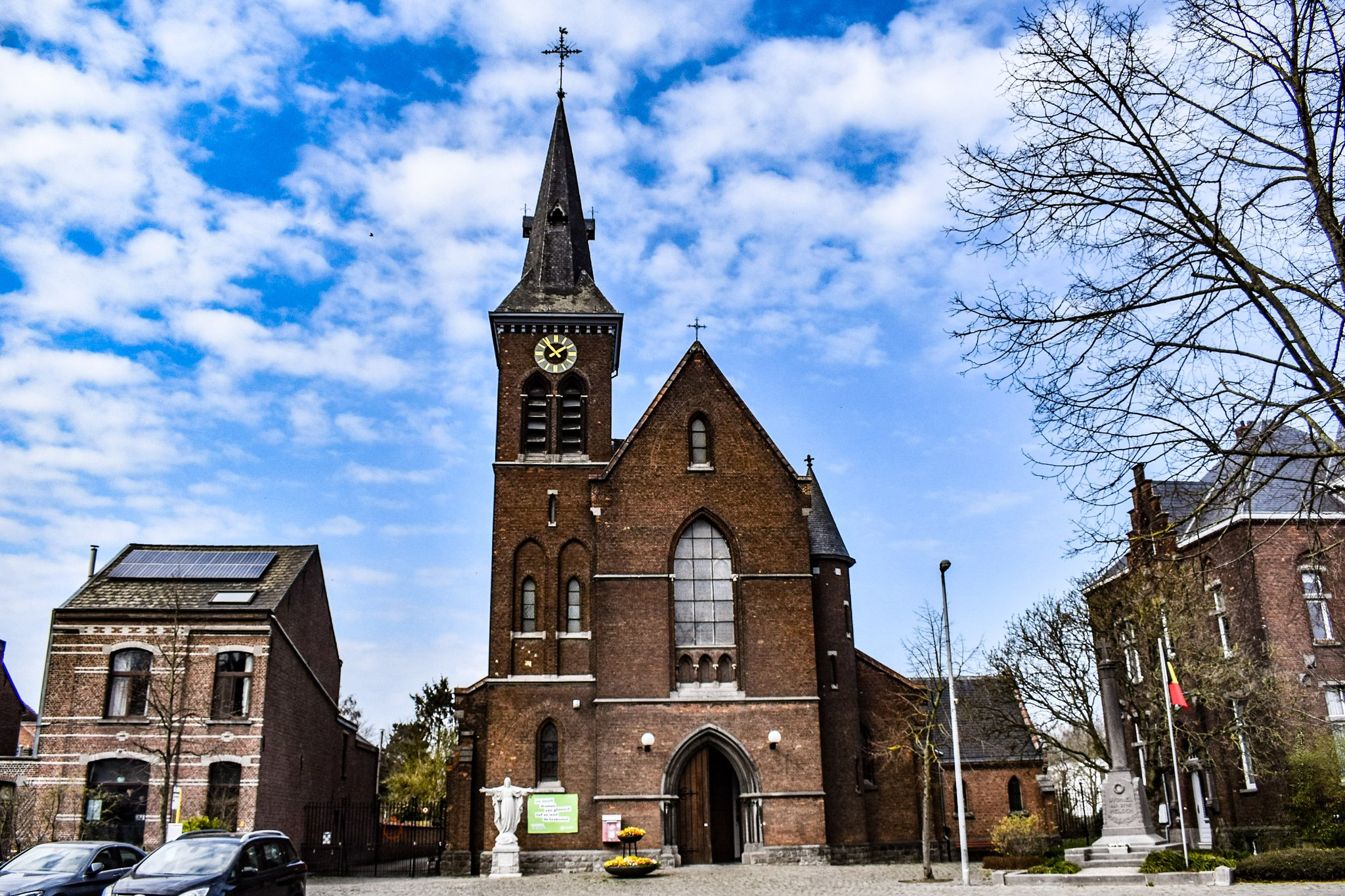
- St Hadrian Church
- Interactive map of Wijgmaal
- Location within Belgium Location within Flemish Brabant
- Coordinates: 50°55′33″N 4°42′06″E
- Country: Belgium
- Community: Flemish Community
- Region: Flemish Region
- Province: Flemish Brabant
- Arrondissement: Leuven
- Municipality: Leuven

Area
  - Total: 4.59 km^{2} (1.77 sq mi)

Population (2020-01-01)
  - Total: 3,793
  - Density: 826/km^{2} (2,140/sq mi)
- Postal codes: 3018
- Area codes: 016

Wijgmaal (Dutch pronunciation: [ˈʋɛixmaːl]) is a village of the city of Leuven located in the province of Flemish Brabant, Flemish Region, Belgium. Before the fusion of the Belgian municipalities in 1977, it was a part of the municipality of Herent. On 1 January 1977, it was merged into Leuven. Wijgmaal has never been a municipality, but in some sources, Wijgmaal is mentioned as a "deelgemeente" (sub-municipality).
