= Kevin Roelandts =

Belgian footballer

Personal information
- Full name: Kevin Roelandts
- Date of birth: 27 August 1982 (age 44)
- Place of birth: Bruges, Belgium
- Height: 1.86 m (6 ft 1 in)
- Position: Attacking midfielder

Senior career*
Years	Team	Apps	(Gls)
2003–2007	Club Brugge	49	(3)
2007	→ Germinal Beerschot (loan)	17	(3)
2007–2011	Zulte Waregem	96	(22)
2011–2013	OH Leuven	10	(1)
2012–2013	→ Antwerp (loan)	0	(0)
2013–2014	Maldegem	0	(0)

International career
2009	Belgium	2	(1)
- * Club domestic league appearances and goals

Kevin Roelandts (born 27 August 1982) is a retired Belgian midfielder who last played for Maldegem. He is a technical, clever, and hard-working central midfielder. He also plays a fullback. He has played for the Belgium national football team.

== Biography ==
Roelandts played for the youth set-up at Club Brugge. In 2002, he went into the A-team. His debut came against VfB Stuttgart in the UEFA Europa League. He made his debut in the Champions League one year later against Celta Vigo (1–1), where in the last minutes of the game he provided a decisive assist for Rune Lange. This meant Club Brugge were still in contention for the next round. Roelandts made 13 appearances that season under manager Trond Sollied, but did not succeed in securing a regular place in the side. In the 2005–2006 season, under manager Jan Ceulemans, Roelandts secured a starting place at the club. By the beginning of the 2006–2007 season, Roelandts had lost his place in the side. After negative remarks about teammate Brian Priske in November 2006, he was relegated to the B-team. In December 2006, he was told he could leave Club Brugge. Passing Belgian clubs had been interested, but Roelandts finally chose to be loaned out to K.F.C. Germinal Beerschot. In June 2007, he signed a three-year contract at SV Zulte Waregem.

== International career ==
Roelandts was called up for Belgium's Kirin Cup matches against Chile and Japan. He made his debut in the match against Chile on 29 May 2009 and scored once.

Kevin Roelandts: International Goals
Goal	Date	Venue	Opponent	Score	Result	Competition
1	29 May 2009	Fukuda Denshi Arena, Chiba	Chile	1 – 1	Drawn	Kirin Cup

== Honours ==
Club Brugge

- Belgian First Division A: 2004–05
- Belgian Cup: 2003–04
- Belgian Super Cup: 2004, 2005
