= Emmerik De Vriese =

Belgian footballer

Personal information
- Date of birth: 14 February 1985 (age 41)
- Place of birth: Knokke-Heist, Belgium
- Height: 1.81 m (5 ft 11 1/2 in)
- Position: Winger

Team information
- Current team: Antonia

Senior career*
| Years | Team | Apps | (Gls) |
| 2005–2008 | Veendam | 70 | (7) |
| 2008–2011 | Antwerp | 83 | (13) |
| 2011–2013 | Oud-Heverlee Leuven | 15 | (1) |
| 2014–2015 | Lokomotiv Plovdiv | 9 | (1) |
| 2015–2016 | Ethnikos Achnas | 27 | (1) |
| 2016–2017 | Ermis Aradippou | 24 | (0) |
| 2017 | Gaz Metan Mediaș | 8 | (0) |
| 2018 | Xylotymbou | 13 | (1) |
| 2018–2021 | Cappellen | | |
| 2021– | Antonia | | |
- * Club domestic league appearances and goals as of 14 April 2018

Emmerik De Vriese (born 14 February 1985) is a Belgian professional footballer who plays as a midfielder for Antonia in the Belgian Provincial Leagues.

== Career ==
Before joining OH Leuven, De Vriese played three seasons at BV Veendam in the second division in the Netherlands. He then moved to Antwerp, where he also played for three seasons before being signed by newly promoted Oud-Heverlee Leuven in 2011, where he was released in 2013.

On 8 September 2014, following a short trial period De Vriese signed for Bulgarian side Lokomotiv Plovdiv as a free agent. He rarely featured for the team and left Lokomotiv Plovdiv in the summer of 2015.
