= Lionel Gendarme =

Belgian footballer

Personal information
- Full name: Lionel Gendarme
- Date of birth: 20 February 1989 (age 37)
- Place of birth: Wilrijk
- Height: 1.87 m (6 ft 2 in)
- Position: Left back

Team information
- Current team: Vaux-Noville

Youth career
- 1995–1998: Seraing
- 1998–1999: RFC Liège
- 1999–2010: Standard Liège
- 2010: Levante

Senior career*
Years	Team	Apps	(Gls)
2009–2010	Standard Liège B	?	(?)
2011–2012	OH Leuven	9	(0)
2012–2013	Oostende	11	(0)
2013–2014	Union SG	28	(3)
2014–2015	Seraing United	10	(0)
2015–2016	Cointe-Liège	2	(0)
2016–2018	Solières	0	(0)
2018–2019	Warnant	0	(0)
2019–2020	Momalle	0	(0)
2020–2021	Fraiture	0	(0)
2021–	Vaux-Noville	0	(0)

International career
2005–2006	Belgium U17	5	(0)
2007	Belgium U18	7	(0)
2007–2008	Belgium U19	7	(0)
2010	Belgium U20	2	(0)
- * Club domestic league appearances and goals as of 22 November 2015

Lionel Gendarme (born 20 February 1989) is a Belgian professional footballer who currently plays for Vaux-Noville in the Belgian Provincial Leagues as a left back.

== Career ==
Before joining Oostende, Gendarme played no less than 12 seasons with Standard Liège before enjoying a short spell at Levante. In the beginning of 2011, he was signed by OH Leuven as a backup player and was part of the team that achieved promotion to the Belgian Pro League in 2011. Not receiving much playing time in the first division, Gendarme chose to move to Oostende following the 2011–12 season. In June 2013 it was announced he had signed at Union Saint-Gilloise for one year.
