= Maxime Annys =

Belgian footballer (born 1986)

Personal information
- Date of birth: 24 July 1986 (age 40)
- Place of birth: Ostend, Belgium
- Height: 1.86 m (6 ft 1 in)
- Position: Defensive midfielder

Team information
- Current team: Wellen (manager)

Youth career
- KV Oostende

Senior career*
| Years | Team | Apps | (Gls) |
| 2004–2007 | KSV Roeselare | 56 | (7) |
| 2007 | RAEC Mons | | |
| 2008 | MVV | 9 | (0) |
| 2008–2009 | RFC Tournai | 25 | (4) |
| 2009–2012 | OH Leuven | 88 | (7) |
| 2012–2013 | Sint-Truiden | 6 | (0) |
| 2013 | FC Hjørring | 8 | (0) |
| 2013–2018 | KVC Westerlo | 50 | (9) |
| 2018–2019 | Eendracht Aalst | | |
| 2019–2020 | Overijse | | |
| 2020 | Wellen | | |

Managerial career
- 2020–: Wellen
- * Club domestic league appearances and goals as of 12 October 2015

Maxime Annys (born 24 July 1986) is a retired Belgian football player and manager, who is currently managing Wellen in the Belgian Division 3.

== Career ==
The defender began his career 2004 with Roeselare with which he enjoyed promotion to the Belgian Pro League. After two more seasons with Roeselare at the highest level, he had a short spell at Mons before moving abroad to MVV. He soon returned to Belgium to play one season for second division team Tournai before being signed by OH Leuven from the same division in 2009. After two more seasons with Leuven in the second division, he was again able to take part in promotion festivities as Leuven became second division champions in 2011. Following the 2011–12 season, he moved to Sint-Truiden, but during the 2012–13 season he was deemed surplus. In February 2013 Sint-Truiden agreed to terminate his contract to allow Annys to move as a free agent to Hjørring. After half a season at Hjørring, Annys returned to Belgium as he signed with Westerlo.
