= Pieter Nys =

Belgian footballer (born 1989)

Personal information
- Date of birth: 13 July 1989 (age 37)
- Place of birth: Hasselt, Belgium
- Height: 1.80 m (5 ft 11 in)
- Position: Defensive midfielder

Youth career
- 1995–1998: Zonhoven VV
- 1998–2008: Genk

Senior career*
Years	Team	Apps	(Gls)
2008–2010	Genk	0	(0)
2009–2010	→ Fortuna Sittard (loan)	27	(1)
2010–2012	OH Leuven	42	(1)
2012–2015	Sparta Rotterdam	64	(3)
2015–2019	MVV	108	(15)
2020	Bocholt	4	(1)
2020–2021	Zonhoven United		
- * Club domestic league appearances and goals

Pieter Nys (born 13 July 1989) is a Belgian former professional footballer who played as a defensive midfielder. During his career he played for Genk, Fortuna Sittard, OH Leuven and Sparta Rotterdam.
