= Floribert N'Galula =

Belgian footballer (born 1987)

Personal information
- Date of birth: 7 March 1987 (age 39)
- Place of birth: Brussels, Belgium
- Height: 1.83 m (6 ft 0 in)
- Positions: Defender; defensive midfielder

Team information
- Current team: Bayern Munich (assistant)

Youth career
- 1999–2003: Anderlecht
- 2003–2007: Manchester United

Senior career*
Years	Team	Apps	(Gls)
2007–2008	Randers	12	(0)
2008–2009	Sparta Rotterdam	5	(0)
2010	D.C. United	3	(0)
2011	TPS	20	(0)
2011–2012	OH Leuven	28	(0)
2013–2017	BX Brussels		

Managerial career
- 2018–2019: BX Brussels
- 2019–2022: Anderlecht (assistant)
- 2022–2024: Burnley (assistant)
- 2024–: Bayern Munich (assistant)
- * Club domestic league appearances and goals as of 20:29, 5 July 2012 (UTC) ‡ National team caps and goals as of 10:50, 7 February 2010 (UTC)

Floribert N'Galula (born 7 March 1987) is a Belgian professional football manager and former player who currently an assistant coach for Bundesliga club Bayern Munich.

As a player, he was a defender or defensive midfielder who came through the youth academy at Manchester United, before playing professionally for Randers, Sparta Rotterdam, D.C. United, TPS, OH Leuven and BX Brussels.

== Playing career ==
Beginning his career with Manchester United, he later played for Randers and Sparta Rotterdam. He signed for Major League Soccer side D.C. United in the United States in January 2010, but was released from his contract just over a month later.

On 4 February 2011, N'Galula signed for the Finnish Veikkausliiga side TPS until the end of the 2011 season. On 4 August 2011, he signed a two-year deal with Belgian team OH Leuven, but was released by the club already after the first season. In the summer of 2013, N'Galula signed for BX Brussels, which was newly purchased by Vincent Kompany. In the meantime, he also served as head coach of the club's youth teams.

== Coaching career ==
After retiring from football, N'Galula became head coach of his last club BX Brussels in January 2018, succeeding Amaury Toussaint.

In June 2019, he joined the coaching staff at Anderlecht under manager Vincent Kompany, with whom he played as a youngster at the club. He also served as assistant coach at the U21 team.

N'Galula followed Kompany to English Premier League club Burnley as first team coach at the beginning of the 2022–23 season. He later re-joined Kompany's staff at Bundesliga club Bayern Munich in June 2024.

== Personal life ==
He is married with two children. His brother, Gabriel N'Galula, is also a former professional footballer.
