= Wannes Van Tricht =

Belgian footballer

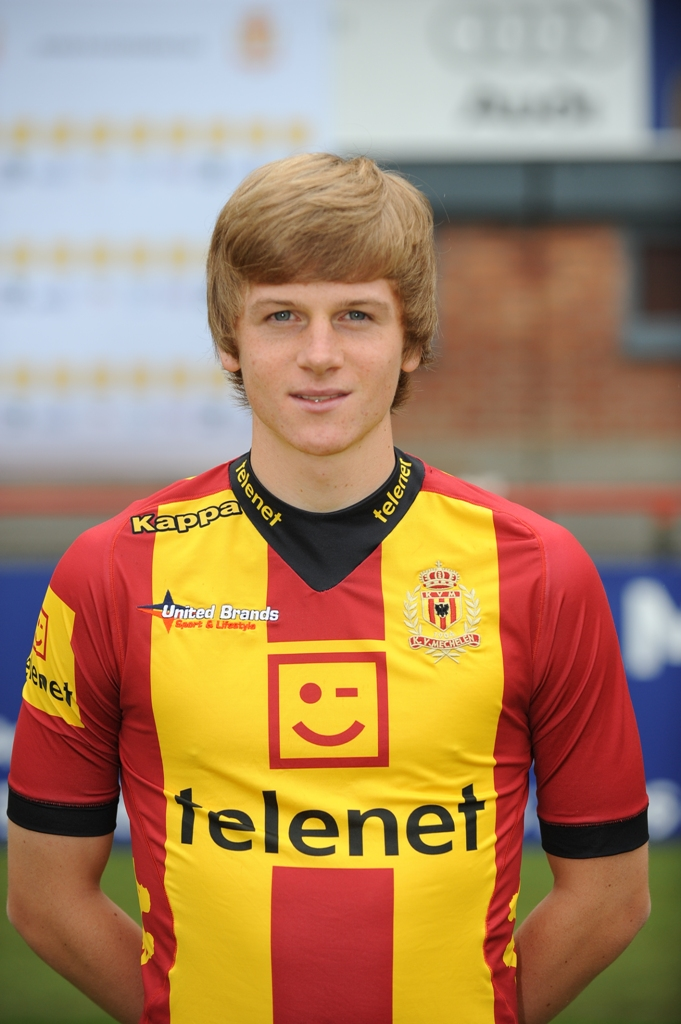
- Wannes Van Tricht in 2012.

Personal information
- Date of birth: 13 November 1993 (age 32)
- Place of birth: Leuven, Belgium
- Height: 1.73 m (5 ft 8 in)
- Position: Midfielder

Team information
- Current team: FC Lebbeke

Youth career
- KV Mechelen

Senior career*
Years	Team	Apps	(Gls)
2011–2015	KV Mechelen	24	(2)
2014	→ Geel (loan)	7	(0)
2015–2016	Rupel Boom	26	(5)
2016–2018	Eendracht Aalst	52	(10)
2018–2019	Dender	17	(1)
2020	KFC Duffel		
2020–	FC Lebbeke		

International career
2010	Belgium U17	2	(0)
2010–2011	Belgium U18	10	(0)
2011–2012	Belgium U19	13	(0)
2012	Belgium U21	2	(1)
- * Club domestic league appearances and goals as of 11:35, 14 February 2021 (UTC)

Wannes Van Tricht (born 13 November 1993) is a Belgian footballer who currently plays for FC Lebbeke.
