= Derick Ogbu =

Nigerian professional footballer

Personal information
- Full name: Derick Chuka Ogbu
- Date of birth: 19 March 1990 (age 36)
- Place of birth: Port Harcourt, Nigeria
- Height: 1.80 m (5 ft 11 in)
- Position: Forward

Team information
- Current team: Bocholt

Youth career
- Enugu Rangers

Senior career*
Years	Team	Apps	(Gls)
2009–2010	Al-Salam	?	(12)
2010–2011	Umm Salal	8	(5)
2011–2013	OH Leuven	60	(18)
2013–2014	CFR Cluj	26	(6)
2014–2015	Liaoning Whowin	42	(16)
2016	Ventforet Kofu	11	(1)
2016–2017	Debrecen	5	(0)
2018	Tskhinvali	5	(4)
2019	Al Ittihad Alexandria	5	(0)
2021	Universitatea Cluj	8	(2)
2023–2024	Bocholt	7	(1)
Total		175	(68)
- * Club domestic league appearances and goals as of 10 December 2023

Derick Chuka Ogbu (born 19 March 1990) nicknamed Chuka, is a Nigerian former professional footballer with a Belgium passport who plays as a forward. He has played most notably in the Belgian Pro League, Romanian Liga I, Chinese Super League and Japanese Top League.

== Club career ==
=== Gulf ===
Ogbu started his career in Al-Salam where he played for one season and became the joint top scorer in the Oman Professional League, scoring 12 goals in the 2008/2009 season.

In February 2010, he took an important step in his career making a free transfer to Umm Salal in the Qatar Stars League. At that time Umm Salal was just celebrating their massive achievement, being the first Qatar club to reach the Asian Champions League Quarterfinals. Henk ten Cate gave young Ogbu his debut, both in the league games and in the cup. Ogbu scored an important goal on his debut in the cup, which led his team to the Quarter and semi-final and Final. As a young striker, he led the front line in his first massive game in the Qatar Crown Prince Cup Final, where he played 90minutes in front of a massive crowd of 55,000 fans in attendance in Khalifa International Stadium, of which both the late Ruler of Qatar( Hamad Bin Khalifa At Thani and formal president of Brazil Lulu de Silva was in attendance.

After a season and a half, with 5 goals in his senior games, and 10 goals in reserve games, he left for trial at PSV Eindhoven during the 2011/2012 pre-season on the recommendation of then Umm Salal manager Henk ten Cate. However, his trials with Eindhoven were successful, as he scored in all the 3 test games. Still, unfortunately, he did not sign for them because of the financial situation of Eindhoven and also more complications as he comes from outside the EU, but Fred Rutten, the coach of PSV, described him as "very fast and interesting player, with good character and a hard shot". Due to the strong connection between PSV Eindhoven and the Belgium club (OHL Leuven), the player was sent to OHL to play so PSV could keep their eyes on him, as they expect their financial situation to improve. On 10 August 2011, he signed up for the Belgium club Oud-Heverlee Leuven Ogbu became the love of the fans in Leuven, the fans love him and he loves the club. The instantly became the club hitman and their valuable asset. Ogbu was once quoted, I love when the fans sing with my name, it gives me extra adrenaline to fight for the fans. After two amazing seasons in Leuven where he scored 18 goals, of which 7 of those 18 goals are almighty important goals for the club's history. After two years in the top flight in Jupiler League Belgium, Ogbu decided it was time to move on to another challenge. Ogbu made a transfer of 500,000 euros to Romanian Giant CFR Cluj. Due to the financial instability at the club, players were not paid for months, Ogbu managed to score 6goals in Romania, before a massive offer came from Liaoning Whom Fc China. An offer of 1.2 million dollars was made for the player, and both the club and the player accepted the offer. Ogbu played his first and only Europa League game for the Romanian Giant before moving to China on 23 July 2014. It didn't take his time to adjust to Chinese football as Ogbu scored twice on his debut in China's first league against Shenzhen. He went on to write his name in Chinese Super League history, scoring 16 goals in Liaoning FC before moving to Japan Ventforest Kofu. He played less than a season with the Japan top league, making 11 appearances with only one goal. Things didn't go well for the player in Japan, so he decided to move back to Europe, landing a deal with DVSC Debrecen. Injuries and potential transfer sage with the club didn't allow the player to settle in Debrecen. In 2019, The player signed with Al Ittihad Club in Egypt, but unfortunately, the player was not happy with the situation of things in Egypt, so he decided to break his contract, so he can move back to Europe.

In January 2020, he signed a pre-contract with a Chinese League One club, took his Chinese visa, and received his flight ticket, sadly 3 days before the departure date, COVID-19 started.

Chuka transferred to Chinese Super League side Liaoning Whowin on 25 July 2014.

== Career statistics ==
Appearances and goals by club, season and competition
Club	Season	League			National Cup		League Cup		Continental		Other		Total	
Club	Season	Division	Apps	Goals	Apps	Goals	Apps	Goals	Apps	Goals	Apps	Goals	Apps	Goals
Umm Salal	2010–11	Qatar Stars League	8	5	0	0	—		—		0	0	8	5
OH Leuven	2011–12	Belgian Pro League	23	10	0	0	—		—		—		23	10
OH Leuven	2012–13	Belgian Pro League	35	8	1	0	—		—		2	0	38	8
OH Leuven	Total		58	18	1	0	—		—		2	0	61	18
CFR Cluj	2013–14	Liga I	26	6	0	0	—		—		—		26	6
CFR Cluj	2014–15	Liga I	—		—		—		1	0	—		1	0
CFR Cluj	Total		26	6	0	0	—		1	0	—		27	6
Liaoning Whowin	2014	Chinese Super League	15	8	—		—		—		—		15	8
Liaoning Whowin	2015	Chinese Super League	27	8	1	0	—		—		—		28	8
Liaoning Whowin	Total		42	16	1	0	—		—		—		43	16
Ventforet Kofu	2016	J1 League	11	1	—		3	0	—		—		14	1
Debrecen	2016–17	NB I	5	0	0	0	—		—		—		5	0
Tskhinvali	2018	Erovnuli Liga 2	5	4	0	0	—		—		—		5	4
Al Ittihad Alexandria	2018–19	Egyptian Premier League	5	0	0	0	—		—		—		5	0
Universitatea Cluj	2020–21	Liga II	8	1	1	1	—		—		—		9	2
Bocholt	2023–24	Belgian Division 2	7	1	—		—		—		—		7	1
Career total			175	56	3	1	3	0	1	0	2	0	184	57
