= Giuseppe Rossini =

Belgian footballer (born 1986)

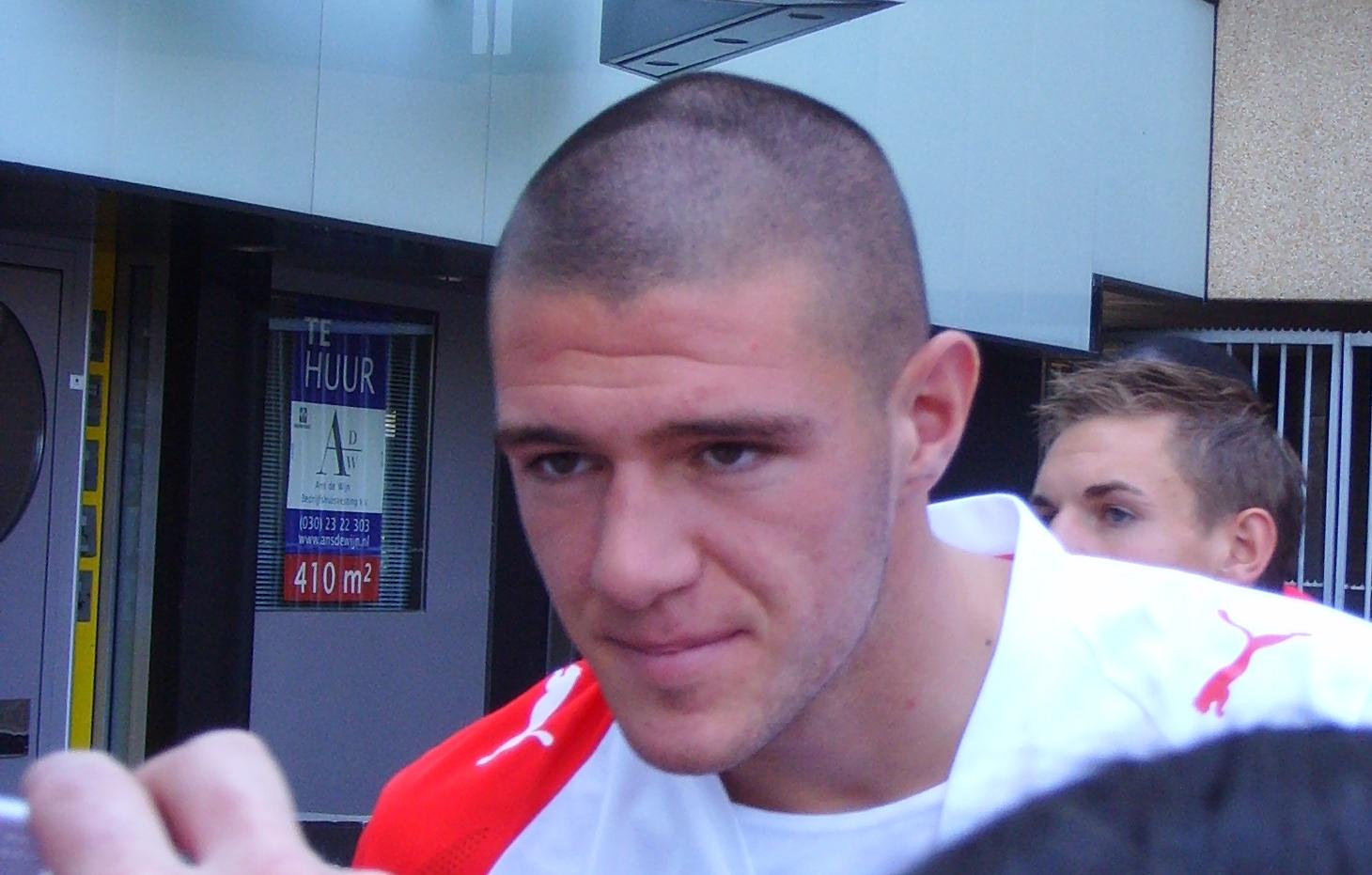
- Rossini with Utrecht in 2007

Personal information
- Full name: Giuseppe Rossini
- Date of birth: 23 August 1986 (age 40)
- Place of birth: Bari, Italy
- Height: 1.93 m (6 ft 4 in)
- Position: Striker

Youth career
- Houdeng
- Charleroi
- Mons
- 2004–2005: Utrecht

Senior career*
| Years | Team | Apps | (Gls) |
| 2005–2008 | Utrecht | 46 | (3) |
| 2008–2010 | Mechelen | 44 | (11) |
| 2010–2011 | Kortrijk | 32 | (8) |
| 2011–2012 | Zulte Waregem | 15 | (3) |
| 2012 | → Sint Truiden (loan) | 9 | (3) |
| 2012–2015 | Charleroi | 47 | (8) |
| 2015 | → OH Leuven (loan) | 14 | (6) |
| 2015–2016 | Progrès Niederkorn | 15 | (7) |
| 2016–2017 | Olympic Charleroi | 27 | (9) |
| 2017–2018 | Solières | 22 | (3) |
| 2018–2019 | Jemeppe | ? | (+20) |
| 2019–2022 | Tamines | 41 | (29) |
| 2022–2023 | Olympic Namur | | |
| 2023–2024 | Forchies | | |

International career
| 2007–2008 | Belgium U21 | 9 | (4) |
- * Club domestic league appearances and goals

Giuseppe Rossini (born 23 August 1986) is a Belgian former professional footballer who played as a striker.

== Club career ==
=== Youth career ===
Rossini was born in Bari, Italy, but at age four he moved to La Louvière with his family. Rossini started playing football at local club RFC Houdeng. After three years with the youth of Charleroi and another year at RFC Houdeng, he was discovered by a Mons scouts, where he signed as a youth player.

=== Professional career ===
At a match against Beveren's reserve team, Utrecht scout, Nol de Ruiter watched from the sideline. Shortly after, Rossini was signed by Utrecht from the Netherlands. After playing a year for the reserve side, he was promoted to the first team. There, he played between 2005 and 2008. He was mostly used as a substitute.

In 2008, he was signed by Mechelen from his homeland. There, he played regularly, but like in Utrecht, he never managed to become a regular starter. In July 2010, he was picked up by Kortrijk, where he signed a contract until 2013.

After scoring eight goals in 27 league matches for Kortrijk, Rossini signed with Belgian Pro League side, Zulte Waregem in May 2011. There, he also struggled to truly break through, finishing his only season with the club with 15 appearances in which he managed to score three goals. The season ended in a disappointing 13th place for the club. Rossini was, however, already sent on loan to Sint Truiden halfway through the season. The Limburg-based club were in a dire financial situation after owner Roland Duchâtelet had left the club. Sint-Truiden finished bottom of the league, and Rossini could not retain the club in the highest division with his three goals in nine appearances.

In August 2012, Rossini returned to one of his first youth clubs, Charleroi. In his first season at the club, he competed for a spot in the starting lineup for the club from Pays Noir. He scored six goals in 22 games that season. However, as the second season progressed, he received less and less playing opportunities. He made 15 appearances that season and only managed to score once. In Rossini's third season with Charleroi, he was loaned out to second-tier OH Leuven during the winter transfer window. His performances improved there, as he scored eight goals in 16 games with Leuven finishing in fifth place in the league standings which meant qualification to the promotion play-offs. Leuven eventually won promotion, and they returned to Belgian First Division A after one season absence.

=== Post-professional career ===
After achieving promotion with Leuven, Rossini retired from professional football and moved to Luxembourg side Progrès Niederkorn. In his sole season there, he made only 15 appearances due to injuries, and scored 7 goals. After this, he returned to Belgium.

In Belgium, he returned to Charleroi again; this time to play for lower-tier club Olympic Charleroi. The 2016–17 was the first season after the league reforms of the summer of 2016, with Olympic Charleroi playing in the Belgian Division 2. They finished third and just missed out on promotion to the Belgian National Division 1. Rossini was a regular starter, making 27 appearances and scoring nine goals.

In the summer of 2017, Rossini left for Solières Sport, where he experienced a disappointing season; Solières finished ninth and Rossini only scored three goals in 22 games. Afterwards, he left for the Belgian Provincial Leagues, here he went for Jemeppe. The team finished second and won the league title of the regular season with two points, but lost in the final round of promotion play-offs. Rossini managed to score more than 20 times in the competition. At the end of the season, he left for fellow Provincial League club Tamines. With the club, he won promotion back to the fifth-tier Belgian Division 3, the division from which they had been relegated in the 2018–19 season.
