= Jordan Remacle =

Belgian footballer

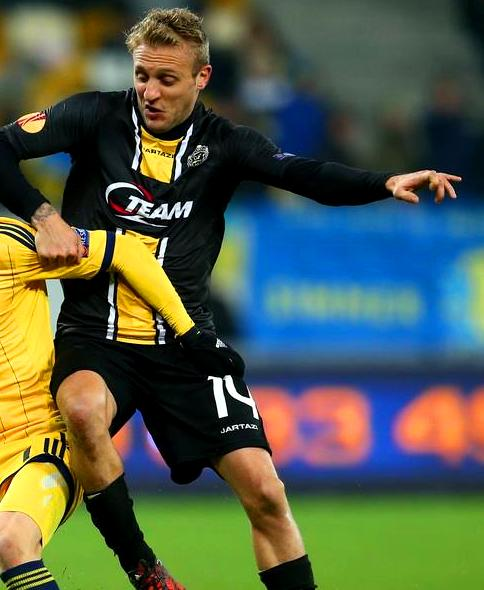

Personal information
- Full name: Jordan Remacle
- Date of birth: 14 February 1987 (age 39)
- Place of birth: Verviers, Belgium
- Height: 1.75 m (5 ft 9 in)
- Position: Forward

Youth career
- Standard Liège
- Genk

Senior career*
Years	Team	Apps	(Gls)
2003–2006	Genk	8	(0)
2006–2009	RKC Waalwijk	33	(2)
2007–2008	→ Helmond Sport (loan)	34	(9)
2009	→ RBC Roosendaal (loan)	15	(1)
2009–2010	RBC Roosendaal	26	(5)
2010–2012	OH Leuven	66	(30)
2012–2013	Gent	18	(2)
2012–2013	→ Waasland-Beveren (loan)	14	(2)
2013–2015	Lokeren	44	(4)
2015–2016	OH Leuven	19	(3)
2016–2017	Antwerp	10	(1)
2017–2018	Charleroi	11	(1)
2018–2019	Solières	23	(4)
2019–2021	Herstal	26	(17)
2021–2023	La Calamine	0	(0)

International career
2002–2003	Belgium U16	18	(10)
2003–2004	Belgium U17	15	(3)
2004–2005	Belgium U18	5	(0)
2005–2006	Belgium U19	4	(0)
- * Club domestic league appearances and goals as of 9 May 2021 (UTC)

Jordan Remacle (born 14 February 1987) is a retired Belgian footballer who last played for La Calamine in the Belgian Provincial Leagues. Remacle is a forward who was born in Verviers and made his debut in professional football, being part of the Racing Genk squad in the 2003–04 season. His younger brother Martin Remacle is also a footballer.

== Honours ==
Lokeren

- Belgian Cup: 2013–14
