= Georgios Galitsios =

Greek footballer (born 1986)

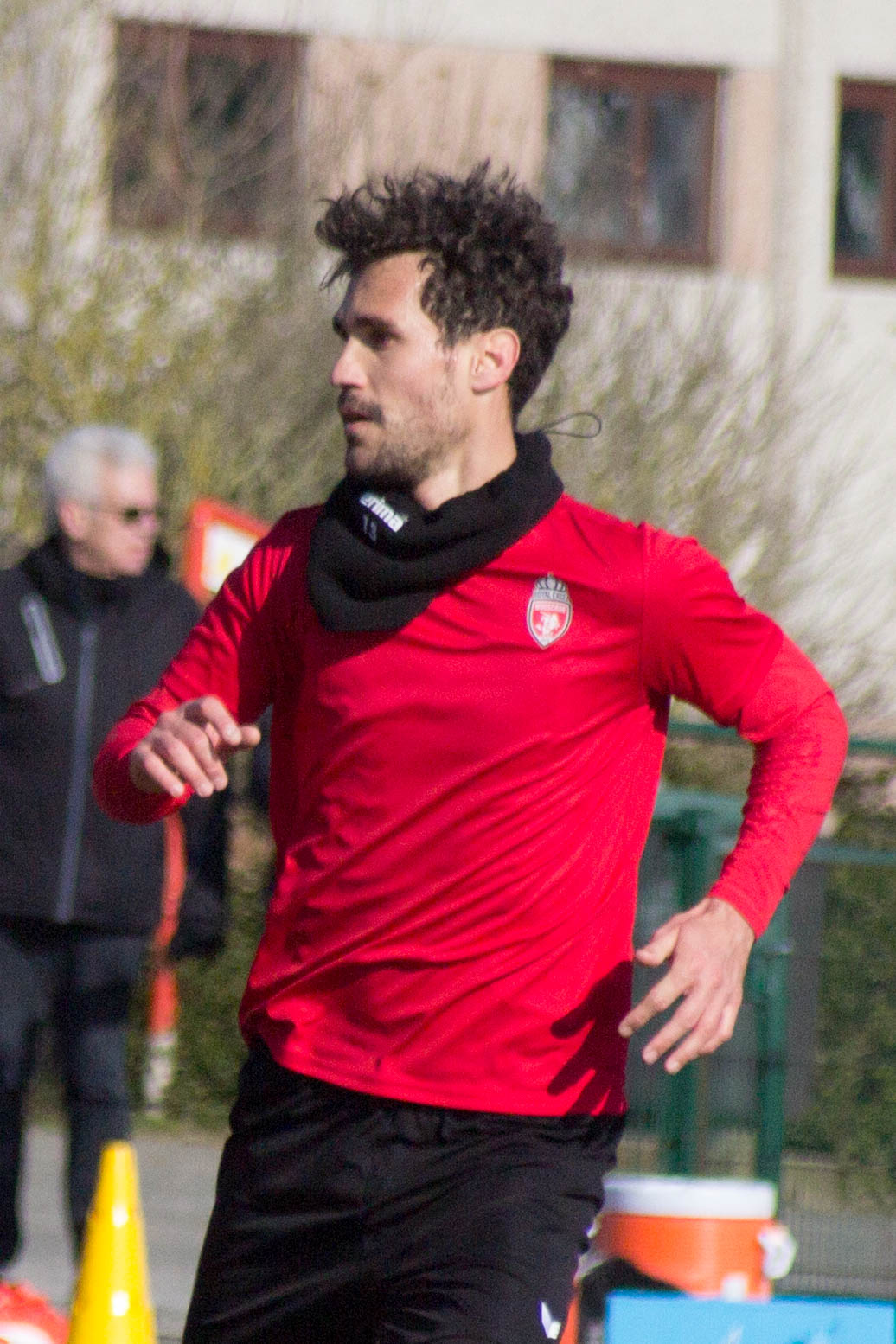

Personal information
- Date of birth: 6 July 1986 (age 40)
- Place of birth: Larissa, Greece
- Height: 1.83 m (6 ft 0 in)
- Position: Right back

Senior career*
Years	Team	Apps	(Gls)
2003–2004	Apollon Larissa		
2004–2008	AEL	91	(2)
2008–2011	Olympiacos	31	(0)
2011	→ Panionios (loan)	9	(2)
2011–2017	Lokeren	158	(2)
2017–2019	Mouscron	24	(0)
2019–2021	Anorthosis Famagusta	44	(6)
2022	Panionios	6	(0)

International career^{‡}
2003–2004	Greece U17	6	(0)
2005–2007	Greece U19	3	(0)
2005–2008	Greece U21	15	(0)
- * Club domestic league appearances and goals as of 19:06, 22 March 2021 (UTC). ‡ National team caps and goals as of 20 August 2008

Georgios Galitsios (Greek: Γεώργιος Γκαλίτσιος; born 6 July 1986) is a Greek professional footballer who plays as a right back. He is a right-sided defender who has made a number of appearances for Greece's youth teams. More of an endurance player than a virtuoso, he is distinguished by exceptional leg strength.

== Club career ==
=== AEL ===
Galitsios began his football career at Apollon Larissa. On 20 July 2004 he signed for AEL. He played an important role and became a vital player for the club, including their appearances in the UEFA Cup group stages during the 2007–08 season, attracting interest from Greece's bigger clubs. He is the son of Giannis Galitsios, who was also a star player for his hometown team, AEL during the 1980s.

Scored first league goal on 7 October 2007 in Larissa's 3–3 home draw with Levadiakos, followed it with another against Panathinaikos the following month. He ever-present in club's six-game UEFA Cup run, which included elimination of Blackburn Rovers FC. He made a positive impact in his first Super League campaign, 2005/06, appearing in 27 of the team's 30 matches, helping them finish eighth a season after promotion.

Olympiakos agreed with Larissa for the acquisition of 22 years' old defender, who will stay in the club till the end of the season. The transfer is closed to a fee of €800,000 plus a 20% resale. Galitsios agreed to sign a five years' contract, while earnings will be graded starting from €300,000 annually.

=== Olympiacos ===
A wholehearted right-back with tremendous stamina, Giorgios Galitsios joined Olympiacos in January 2008 after displaying consistent form over several seasons for provincial Greek club ΑΕΛ and joined for the 2008–09 season. He played against a vital Champions League qualifier against Arsenal, but in the 75th minute he suffered a minor injury, which led to him being substituted. George Galitsios some years later stated that : "My character put me into trouble sometimes. Moreover, my eccentricity plays a key role in Olympiakos. It was a totally bad behavior".

After three years, he succeeded to have only 45 appearances in all competitions with the club.

=== Panionios ===
On 28 January, he joined Panionios on a 6-month loan. The player had also an offer from his former club Larissa, but he preferred to join Panionios having the opportunity to play a key role replacing Giannis Maniatis.

=== Lokeren ===
During the winter of 2011-2012 he signed a contract at Koninklijke Sporting Club Lokeren in Belgium after being released from Olympiacos in July 2011.

The former defender of Olympiakos is signed a six-month contract as Lokeren looking to cover the right side of its defense, concluding that Galitsios could be an ideal case. He was in search for a team after his training period with Werder Bremen. He made his debut with the club in a 1–1 away draw against Leuven. On 26 December 2013, he scored his first goal with the club in a 3–0 away win against Oostende.

Galitsios signed for two more years with the club till the end of 2014/15 season, as the management of the club was completely satisfied with his performance and activated the option that existed in their agreement. The defender was surprised when he hears the news. "But it makes me happy of course. I feel good at Lokeren, Lokeren is satisfied with me. Club could unilaterally extend my contract. So that's happened now," said Galitsios. Lokeren coach Peter Maes gives some explanation. "'Gali' is a player that you can always count on. Moreover, he has made tremendous progress in the last year and a half. Initially he was a Greek, he is now more 'European'. I mean football for him was more of a game, and now is more of a job. In terms of efficiency, professionalism and discipline in the game has grown tremendously, in line with club expectations."

On 22 March 2014, Lokeren fired a second Belgian Cup in three seasons in his pocket. Lokeren won with the smallest difference from Zulte Waregem. "This is an important victory in the history of the club," said Giorgos Galitsios afterwards. "Lokeren already picks up a second trophy in three seasons. Lokeren is simply a top club." "It was a hard fought victory", the defender continued. "But that's normal for a finale, huh. Though we eventually did have the better of the game. So I can say that we are a deserved winner."

Georgios Galitsios is another season under contract with Sporting Lokeren. However, the Greek right back enjoying interest from Panathinaikos, but Lokeren, however, would require a half million euros for the 27-year-old defender.

Lokeren technical director Willy Reynders revealed that Giorgos Galitsios has taken the decision to return to Greece at the end of the 2014/15 season confirming SDNA reports.“I think that Galitsios has taken his decision. He is a father and he wants to return to Greece. But this decisions come along with its effects. Nonetheless, we've got Melnjak as an alternative solution,” Reynders said. Galitsios has 137 appearances (1 goal, 14 assists) with the club in four years.

After a period of six months as a free agent, Galitsios is ready to return to his former team Lokeren. The 29-year-old player six months after he terminated his contract with the Belgian club, which came close to return in Greece for PAOK this January, besides the interest of Köln, Nurnberg and APOEL spent four years with the club. He will sign a 1.5 years contract on a fee of €500,000 with bonuses.

On 13 February 2016, he made his debut with the club in a 3–3 away draw against Leuven, as a substitute. On 7 May 2016, he scored his second goal in Belgian Pro League in a home win against Mechelen. He started the 2016-17 season as the indisputable leader of the right side. On 1 July 2017, he solved his contract with the club. He waited for signing to Cypriot First Division champions APOEL, along with the club's possible qualification in the UEFA Champions League group stage and George Donis's promise that he would sign a contract. APOEL's non-qualification deprived not only the contract with the Cypriots, but also a contract with Belgian club Antwerp.

=== Mouscron ===
On 29 January 2018, after a period of six months as a free agent, he signed a six-month contract with Mouscron until the end of the season with an option of renewing his contract for one year more. On 3 February 2018, in his debut with the club he faced a muscle injury so he had to be replaced in a 0–1 home loss game against Genk.

On 28 March 2018, it was announced that the 32-year-old defender renewed his contract with Mouscron until the summer of 2019 by activating the option in his contract for another year. At the same day, after many years of residence in Belgium, the Greek defender settled all the necessary documents and has acquired the Belgian citizenship.

=== Anorthosis ===
On 20 May 2019, Galitsios signed a two years' contract with Cypriot club Anorthosis for an undisclosed fee.

=== Second Spell to Panionios ===
On 12 January 2022, Galitsios signed a contract with Panionios for an undisclosed fee. The 35-year-old right back has been without a club since the summer, when he solved his contract with Anorthosis.

== International career ==
After getting more actions for Olympiacos in the 2009–10 season, Galitsios was called up on 15 November 2009 by Greece national football team coach Otto Rehhagel for the second leg of the 2010 FIFA World Cup qualification play-offs against Ukraine.

== Honours ==
=== Club ===
ΑΕΛ

- Greek Cup: 2006–07

Olympiacos

- Super League Greece: 2008–2009
- Greek Cup: 2008–2009

Lokeren

- Belgian Cup: 2011–12, 2013–14

Anorthosis Famagusta

- Cypriot Cup: 2020–21
