= Oleksandr Yakovenko (footballer) =

Ukrainian retired footballer (born 1987)

Aleksandr Yakovenko
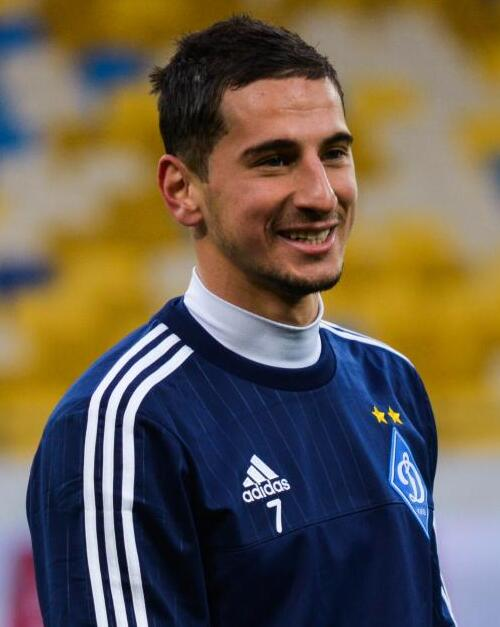

Personal information
- Full name: Oleksandr Pavlovych Yakovenko
- Date of birth: 23 June 1987 (age 39)
- Place of birth: Kyiv, Ukrainian SSR, Soviet Union
- Height: 1.82 m (6 ft 0 in)
- Position: Second striker

Youth career
- 1999–2003: Lokomotyv Kyiv

Senior career*
Years	Team	Apps	(Gls)
2003–2005	Metalist Kharkiv	8	(1)
2004	→ Metalist-2 Kharkiv	9	(1)
2005–2006	Lierse	24	(2)
2006–2008	Genk	14	(0)
2008	→ Anderlecht (loan)	3	(0)
2008–2013	Anderlecht	23	(6)
2009–2011	→ Westerlo (loan)	57	(13)
2012	→ OH Leuven (loan)	13	(3)
2013–2016	Fiorentina	3	(0)
2014	→ Málaga (loan)	9	(1)
2015	→ ADO Den Haag (loan)	11	(2)
2016	Dynamo Kyiv	4	(0)
Total		178	(28)

International career
2002	Ukraine U15	3	(0)
2003	Ukraine U16	5	(3)
2002–2004	Ukraine U17	17	(3)
2005	Ukraine U18	5	(3)
2005	Ukraine U19	6	(2)
2006–2008	Ukraine U21	9	(0)
2010	Ukraine	1	(0)
- * Club domestic league appearances and goals

Oleksandr Pavlovych Yakovenko (Ukrainian: Олександр Павлович Яковенко; born 23 June 1987) is a Ukrainian retired professional footballer who played as a second striker.

== Club career ==
Yakovenko played for Metalist Kharkiv, and Lierse in the past. In the January transfer window for the 2007–08 season, he was loaned out to Anderlecht and made an immediate impact constantly being selected as a starter as well as scoring goals in the domestic league and the UEFA Cup. The following summer Anderlecht signed him on a four-year full-time contract.

After being loaned out for two seasons to Westerlo, Iakovenko chose to be loaned out to Oud-Heverlee Leuven in 2012.

In 2015 he joined Fiorentina. In January 2014 he was loaned to Málaga.

=== Dynamo Kyiv ===
On 2 February 2016, Yakovenko signed a contract with Ukrainian club Dynamo Kyiv until the end of the 2015/16 season with the option to extend it, signing as a free agent after terminating his contract with his former club Fiorentina. On 30 May it was announced that Dynamo had freed Yakovenko instead of signing a new contract. Whilst in Dynamo, he played in the 1/8 of the UEFA Champions League, who got knocked out 3–1 on aggregate against Manchester City, and won the Ukrainian Premier League which was also his first club title that he won as a player. He was released at the end of the 2015–16 season

=== Retirement ===
After failing to sign for the New York Red Bulls, Yakovenko retired at the age of 29.

== Personal life ==
He is the older son of the former Ukrainian footballer and current coach Pavlo Yakovenko. His younger brother Yuriy Yakovenko is also footballer.

== Honours ==
Dynamo Kyiv

- Ukrainian Premier League: 2015–16
