= Bjorn Ruytinx =

Belgian footballer

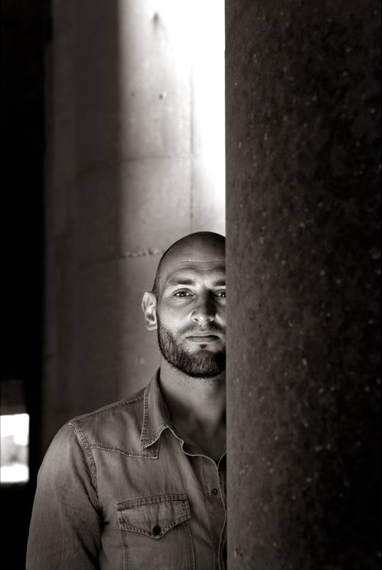
- Bjorn Ruytinx, is a retired Belgian football player

Personal information
- Full name: Bjorn Ruytinx
- Date of birth: 18 August 1980 (age 46)
- Height: 1.86 m (6 ft 1 in)
- Position: Forward

Youth career
- 1998–2000: Halen

Senior career*
Years	Team	Apps	(Gls)
2000–2002	Halen		
2002–2004	Kermt-Hasselt	49	(34)
2004–2014	Oud-Heverlee Leuven	188	(64)
2014–2015	Oostende	29	(3)
2016–2017	Beerschot Wilrijk	21	(3)
2017–2018	Sporting Hasselt	0	(0)
2018–2019	Halen		
- * Club domestic league appearances and goals as of 25 January 2016

Bjorn 'El Toro' Ruytinx (born 18 August 1980) is a retired Belgian professional football player who last played for Halen in the Belgian Provincial Leagues as a forward.

== Career ==
Ruytinx spent most of his career with OH Leuven, where he was signed in 2002 when the team was playing in the Belgian Third Division. With OH Leuven he enjoyed promotion to the Belgian Second Division in 2005 and to the Belgian Pro League in 2011. After staying with the team for a decade (and becoming a club-icon in the process), Ruytinx finally moved to Oostende in 2014. At Oostende, he regularly featured in the squad during his first season, however during his second season he did not play a single minute and as such he moved to third division team Beerschot Wilrijk during the winter 2015–16 transfer window. After a following season at Hasselt and a final one at his initial club Halen, Ruytinx retired in 2019.
