= List of Belgian football transfers summer 2012 =

This is a list of Belgian football transfers for the 2012 summer transfer window. Only transfers involving a team from the Belgian Pro League are listed.

The summer transfer window will open on 1 July 2012, although some transfers took place prior to that date. Players without a club may join one at any time, either during or in between transfer windows. The transfer window ends on 31 August 2012, although a few completed transfers could still only be announced a few days later.

== Sorted by date ==
=== January 2012 ===
Date	Name	Moving from	Moving to	Fee	Note
January 10, 2012	(Belgium) Benjamin Lambot	(Belgium) Antwerp	(Belgium) Lierse	Undisclosed	
January 12, 2012	(France) Kieran Felix	(Belgium) Mouscron-Péruwelz	(Belgium) Mons	Undisclosed	

=== February 2012 ===
Date	Name	Moving from	Moving to	Fee	Note
February 13, 2012	(Hungary) Dániel Tőzsér	(Belgium) Genk	(Italy) Genoa	Undisclosed	
February 16, 2012	(Belgium) Mohammed Aoulad	(Belgium) Brussels	(Belgium) Anderlecht	Free	
February 16, 2012	(Belgium) Abdelhakim Bouhna	(Belgium) Diegem	(Belgium) Anderlecht	Undisclosed	

=== March 2012 ===
Date	Name	Moving from	Moving to	Fee	Note
March 5, 2012	(Romania) Gheorghe Grozav	(Belgium) Standard Liège	(Romania) Universitatea Cluj	Undisclosed	(Note: Grozav was already on loan until the end of the 2011-12 season from Standard Liège to Universitatea Cluj. As part of the loan deal, Cluj chose to pay an undisclosed amount to allow a full transfer to be completed.)
March 5, 2012	(Belgium) Kristof Maes	(Belgium) Beerschot	(Belgium) Gent	Undisclosed	
March 8, 2012	(Belgium) Tim Smolders	(Belgium) Gent	(Belgium) Cercle Brugge	Free	
March 12, 2012	(Romania) Denis Alibec	(Belgium) Mechelen	(Italy) Inter Milan	Loan deal terminated	(Note: Alibec was on loan until the end of the 2011-12 season from Inter Milan to Mechelen. However, Mechelen decided to end the deal immediately, stating that "without giving any more details, some intolerable things have happened and the contract is annulled immediately". As such, Alibec returned early to Inter Milan.)
March 12, 2012	(Belgium) Joachim Van Damme	(Belgium) Waasland-Beveren	(Belgium) Mechelen	Undisclosed	
March 14, 2012	(Egypt) Ahmed Samir Farag	(Egypt) Ismaily	(Belgium) Lierse	Undisclosed	
March 14, 2012	(Belgium) Tony Sergeant	(Belgium) Cercle Brugge	Free Agent	Retires	(Note: Sergeant retires as a professional footballer, but has signed a contract to train youth teams at Gent)
March 14, 2012	(Belgium) Arnaud Biatour	(Belgium) Tienen	(Belgium) Mons	Undisclosed	
March 21, 2012	(Belgium) Thomas Foket	(Belgium) Dilbeek	(Belgium) Gent	Undisclosed	
March 23, 2012	(France) Frédéric Brillant	(Belgium) Oostende	(Belgium) Beerschot	Undisclosed	
March 23, 2012	(Benin) Frédéric Gounongbe	(Belgium) Woluwe-Zaventem	(Belgium) Zulte Waregem	Undisclosed	
March 26, 2012	(Belgium) Mohamed Messoudi	(Belgium) Kortrijk	(Belgium) Gent	Free	
March 29, 2012	(Norway) Geir Ludvig Fevang	(Belgium) Lokeren	(Norway) Haugesund	Undisclosed	

=== April 2012 ===
Date	Name	Moving from	Moving to	Fee	Note
April 16, 2012	(Saudi Arabia) Osama Hawsawi	(Saudi Arabia) Al-Hilal FC	(Belgium) Anderlecht	Undisclosed	
April 17, 2012	(Belgium) Funso Ojo	(Netherlands) PSV	(Belgium) Beerschot	Undisclosed	
April 17, 2012	(Belgium) Spencer Verbiest	(Belgium) Waasland-Beveren	(Belgium) Cappellen	Free	
April 27, 2012	(Belgium) Kenny Thompson	(Belgium) Lierse	(Belgium) OH Leuven	Undisclosed	
April 30, 2012	(Netherlands) Arjan Swinkels	(Netherlands) Willem II	(Belgium) Lierse	Free	

=== May 2012 ===
Date	Name	Moving from	Moving to	Fee	Note
May 1, 2012	(France) Julien Gorius	(Belgium) Mechelen	(Belgium) Genk	Undisclosed	
May 2, 2012	(Belgium) Kevin Geudens	(Belgium) Mechelen	(Belgium) Westerlo	Free	
May 2, 2012	(Belgium) Jonas Heymans	(Belgium) Wetteren	(Belgium) Lierse	Undisclosed	
May 2, 2012	(Democratic Republic of the Congo) Yves Ma-Kalambay	(Belgium) Mechelen	Free Agent	Released	
May 3, 2012	(Belgium) Jan Masureel	(Belgium) Waasland-Beveren	(Belgium) Deinze	Free	
May 8, 2012	(Belgium) Tom Pietermaat	(Belgium) Mechelen	(Belgium) Eendracht Aalst	Loan	(Note: Pietermaat was on loan from KV Mechelen to Rupel Boom during the 2011-12 season. The loan ended but he was now loaned out to Aalst.)
May 10, 2012	(Belgium) Simon Vermeiren	(Belgium) OH Leuven	(Belgium) Heist	Free	(Note: Vermeiren was on loan from OH Leuven to Olympia Wijgmaal during the 2011-12 season. The loan ended but he immediately transferred to Heist.)
May 11, 2012	(Belgium) Sébastien Bruzzese	(Belgium) Gent	(Belgium) Zulte Waregem	Undisclosed	
May 14, 2012	(Germany) Bahattin Köse	(Germany) Arminia Bielefeld	(Belgium) Mons	Undisclosed	
May 14, 2012	(Belgium) Christopher Verbist	(Belgium) Standard Liège	(Belgium) OH Leuven	Undisclosed	(Note: Verbist was on loan from Standard Liège to Charleroi during the 2011-12 season. The loan ended but he immediately transferred to Oud-Heverlee Leuven.)
May 15, 2012	(Belgium) Koenraad Hendrickx	(Belgium) Gent	(Belgium) Cercle Brugge	Undisclosed	
May 16, 2012	(North Macedonia) Tomislav Pačovski	(Belgium) Beerschot	(Belgium) Mechelen	Undisclosed	
May 17, 2012	(France) Kévin Dupuis	(France) Châteauroux	(Belgium) Kortrijk	Free	
May 22, 2012	(Bulgaria) Kostadin Hazurov	(Israel) Bnei Sakhnin	(Belgium) Lierse	Undisclosed	
May 22, 2012	(Belgium) Davy Schollen	(Belgium) Anderlecht	(Belgium) Sint-Truiden	Free	
May 22, 2012	(Belgium) Koen Vanlangendonck	(Belgium) Bocholt	(Belgium) Beerschot	Undisclosed	
May 23, 2012	(Belgium) Wouter Corstjens	(Belgium) Westerlo	(Belgium) Gent	Undisclosed	
May 24, 2012	(Zambia) Rodgers Kola	(Israel) Ashdod	(Belgium) Gent	Undisclosed	
May 24, 2012	(Belgium) Nicolas Lemaire	(Belgium) Mons	(Belgium) Lokeren	Undisclosed	
May 24, 2012	(Belgium) Gilles Lentz	(Belgium) Genk	(Belgium) Roeselare	Free	
May 24, 2012	(Belgium) Thomas Matton	(Belgium) Zulte Waregem	(Belgium) Kortrijk	Undisclosed	
May 24, 2012	(Belgium) Simon Wantiez	(Belgium) Standard Liège	(Belgium) Roeselare	Undisclosed	
May 25, 2012	(Belgium) Stefan Deloose	(Belgium) Lokeren	(Belgium) Beerschot	Undisclosed	
May 25, 2012	(Belgium) Lionel Gendarme	(Belgium) OH Leuven	(Belgium) Oostende	Undisclosed	
May 25, 2012	(Belgium) Pieter Nys	(Belgium) OH Leuven	(Netherlands) Sparta	Undisclosed	
May 25, 2012	(Belgium) Günther Vanaudenaerde	(Belgium) Westerlo	(Belgium) OH Leuven	Undisclosed	
May 26, 2012	(Netherlands) Mitchell Braafhart	(Netherlands) Zaamslag	(Belgium) Cercle Brugge	Undisclosed	
May 26, 2012	(Belgium) Gertjan Martens	(Belgium) Oostende	(Belgium) Waasland-Beveren	Undisclosed	
May 27, 2012	(Belgium) Stijn Minne	(Belgium) Zulte Waregem	(Belgium) Westerlo	Undisclosed	
May 27, 2012	(Belgium) Stef Wils	(Belgium) Westerlo	(Belgium) Cercle Brugge	Undisclosed	
May 28, 2012	(Senegal) Elimane Coulibaly	(Belgium) Gent	(Belgium) Beerschot	Free	
May 29, 2012	(Belgium) Michaël Cordier	(Belgium) Anderlecht	(Belgium) Westerlo	Free	
May 29, 2012	(Senegal) Alain Mendy	(Belgium) Brussels	(Belgium) Waasland-Beveren	Undisclosed	
May 29, 2012	(Nigeria) Michael Uchebo	(Netherlands) VVV	(Belgium) Cercle Brugge	Undisclosed	
May 30, 2012	(Belgium) Nicolas De Mol	(Belgium) OH Leuven	(Belgium) Tienen	Free	(Note: De Mol was on loan from OH Leuven to Olympia Wijgmaal during the 2011-12 season. The loan ended but he immediately transferred to Tienen.)
May 31, 2012	(Belgium) Steven De Petter	(Belgium) Westerlo	(Belgium) Mechelen	Undisclosed	
May 30, 2012	(Belgium) Fred Desomberg	(Belgium) OH Leuven	(Belgium) Tienen	Free	(Note: Desomberg was on loan from OH Leuven to Olympia Wijgmaal during the 2011-12 season. The loan ended but he immediately transferred to Tienen.)
May 31, 2012	(Belgium) Joachim Mununga	(Turkey) Gençlerbirliği	(Belgium) Beerschot	Undisclosed	
May 31, 2012	(Belgium) Lennert Vanherberghen	(Belgium) Tienen	(Belgium) Lierse	Undisclosed	

=== End of 2011–12 season ===
After the end of the 2011–12 season, several players will return from loan to another club or will not have their contracts extended. These will be listed here, together with other players for which the date is also not specified.

Date	Name	Moving from	Moving to	Fee	Note
End of 2011–12 season	(Israel) Shlomi Arbeitman	(Belgium) Westerlo	(Belgium) Gent	Loan Return	
End of 2011–12 season	(South Africa) Sherwin Bailey	(South Africa) ASD Cape Town	(Belgium) Lokeren	Undisclosed	
End of 2011–12 season	(Belgium) Logan Bailly	(Belgium) Genk	(Germany) Borussia Mönchengladbach	Loan Return	
End of 2011–12 season	(Portugal) Amido Baldé	(Belgium) Cercle Brugge	(Portugal) Sporting Lisbon	Loan Return	
End of 2011–12 season	(Netherlands) Jeremy Bokila	(Netherlands) Sparta	(Belgium) Zulte Waregem	Loan Return	
End of 2011–12 season	(Belgium) Thomas Chatelle	(Belgium) Anderlecht	Free Agent	End of Contract	(Note: Chatelle was on loan from Anderlecht to Sint-Truiden during the second half of the 2011-12 season. He returned to Anderlecht after the loan but as his contract with Anderlecht also ended, Chatelle is now a free agent player.)
End of 2011–12 season	(Argentina) Pablo Chavarría	(Belgium) Kortrijk	(Belgium) Anderlecht	Loan Return	
End of 2011–12 season	(Belgium) Koen Daerden	(Belgium) Standard Liège	(Belgium) Sint-Truiden	Loan Return	
End of 2011–12 season	(Belgium) Kevin De Bruyne	(Belgium) Genk	(England) Chelsea	Loan Return	(Note: De Bruyne was sold during the 2011-12 winter transfer window from Genk to Chelsea, but as part of the agreement between both teams, De Bruyne played the remainder of the season for Genk on loan from Chelsea.)
End of 2011–12 season	(Czech Republic) Radek Dejmek	(Belgium) OH Leuven	(Czech Republic) Slovan Liberec	Loan Return	
End of 2011–12 season	(Senegal) Christophe Diandy	(Belgium) OH Leuven	(Belgium) Anderlecht	Loan Return	
End of 2011–12 season	(United States) Mikkel Diskerud	(Belgium) Gent	(Norway) Stabæk	Loan Return	
End of 2011–12 season	(Netherlands) Luciano Dompig	(Belgium) Cercle Brugge	Free Agent	End of Contract	
End of 2011–12 season	(Togo) Serge Gakpé	(Belgium) Standard Liège	(France) Nantes	Loan Return	
End of 2011–12 season	(Ukraine) Sacha Iakovenko	(Belgium) OH Leuven	(Belgium) Anderlecht	Loan Return	
End of 2011–12 season	(Democratic Republic of the Congo) Patou Kabangu	(Belgium) Anderlecht	Free Agent	End of Contract	
End of 2011–12 season	(Belgium) Nathan Kabasele	(Belgium) Westerlo	(Belgium) Anderlecht	Loan Return	
End of 2011–12 season	(Belgium) Thomas Kaminski	(Belgium) OH Leuven	(Belgium) Anderlecht	NA	(Note: Kaminski signed a deal with Beerschot after the 2010-11 season which included him playing for OH Leuven during the 2011-12 season, while moving to Anderlecht for the 2012-13 season. As such, there is no transfer fee between OH Leuven and Anderlecht.)
End of 2011–12 season	(Burkina Faso) Pierre Koulibaly	(Belgium) Sint-Niklaas	(Belgium) Mechelen	Loan Return	(Note: After the loan ended, Koulibaly was released and moved to Montegnée.)
End of 2011–12 season	(Norway) Alexander Mathisen	(Belgium) Lierse	Free Agent	End of Contract	
End of 2011–12 season	(Costa Rica) Roy Myrie	(Belgium) Gent	(Costa Rica) Uruguay de Coronado	Free	(Note: The contract of Myrie ended and Gent subsequently released him. As a free player, Myrie signed with Uruguay de Coronado.)
End of 2011–12 season	(Belgium) Pierre-Yves Ngawa	(Belgium) Standard Liège	(Belgium) Sint-Truiden	Loan Extended	(Note: The loan deal between the teams ended following the 2011-12 season, but was extended by another season allowing Ngawa to stay at Sint-Truiden.)
End of 2011–12 season	(Cameroon) Hervé Onana	(Belgium) Waasland-Beveren	(Belgium) Sint-Truiden	Loan Return	(Note: Onana was on loan from Sint-Truiden to Waasland-Beveren during the 2011-12 season, but when the loan ended he was sold to Tubize.)
End of 2011–12 season	(Portugal) Nuno Reis	(Belgium) Cercle Brugge	(Portugal) Sporting Lisbon	Loan Return	
End of 2011–12 season	(Belgium) Giuseppe Rossini	(Belgium) Sint-Truiden	(Belgium) Zulte Waregem	Loan Return	
End of 2011–12 season	(Brazil) Reynaldo	(Belgium) Westerlo	(Belgium) Anderlecht	Loan Return	
End of 2011–12 season	(Poland) Grzegorz Sandomierski	(Poland) Jagiellonia Białystok	(Belgium) Genk	Loan Return	
End of 2011–12 season	(Belgium) Wesley Sonck	(Belgium) Lierse	Free Agent	End of Contract	
End of 2011–12 season	(Belgium) René Sterckx	(Belgium) Zulte Waregem	(Belgium) Anderlecht	Loan Return	
End of 2011–12 season	(Belgium) David Vandenbroeck	(Belgium) Kortrijk	(Belgium) Zulte Waregem	Loan Return	
End of 2011–12 season	(Belgium) Peter Van Der Heyden	(Belgium) Beerschot	Free Agent	Released	
End of 2011–12 season	(Belgium) Gonzague Vandooren	(Belgium) Lierse	Free Agent	End of Contract	
End of 2011–12 season	(Serbia) Dalibor Veselinović	(Belgium) Kortrijk	(Belgium) Anderlecht	Loan Return	
End of 2011–12 season	(Finland) Hermanni Vuorinen	(Belgium) Charleroi	Free Agent	Released	

=== June 2012 ===
Date	Name	Moving from	Moving to	Fee	Note
June 2, 2012	(France) Jimmy Kamghain	(France) Paris Saint-Germain	(Belgium) Kortrijk	Undisclosed	
June 2, 2012	(Belgium) Tail Schoonjans	(Belgium) OH Leuven	(Belgium) Sint-Niklaas	Free	(Note: Schoonjans was already on loan from OH Leuven to Sint-Niklaas during the second half of the 2011-12 season. The loan ended but he was released by OH Leuven and signed a full contract with Sint-Niklaas.)
June 5, 2012	(Belgium) Wout Bastiaens	(Belgium) Westerlo	(Belgium) OH Leuven	Undisclosed	
June 5, 2012	(Belgium) Jonas Buyse	(Belgium) Cercle Brugge	(Belgium) Wetteren	Loan	
June 5, 2012	(Netherlands) Donovan Deekman	(Belgium) Lokeren	(Netherlands) Sparta	Undisclosed	
June 5, 2012	(Belgium) Kevin Packet	(Belgium) Cercle Brugge	(Belgium) Wetteren	Loan	
June 6, 2012	(Croatia) Ivan Lendrić	(Croatia) Hajduk Split	(Belgium) Zulte Waregem	Undisclosed	
June 6, 2012	(Belgium) Jef Vogels	(Belgium) Gent	(Belgium) Rupel Boom	Undisclosed	
June 8, 2012	(Belgium) Guy Dufour	(Belgium) Standard Liège	(Belgium) Sint-Truiden	Undisclosed	(Note: Dufour was on loan from Standard to Antwerp, the loan ended but now he was sold to Sint-Truiden.)
June 8, 2012	(Belgium) Charly Musonda Junior	(Belgium) Anderlecht	(England) Chelsea	Undisclosed	
June 8, 2012	(Belgium) Lamisha Musonda	(Belgium) Anderlecht	(England) Chelsea	Undisclosed	
June 8, 2012	(Belgium) Tika Musonda	(Belgium) Anderlecht	(England) Chelsea	Undisclosed	
June 8, 2012	(France) Romain Reynaud	(France) Châteauroux	(Belgium) Kortrijk	Undisclosed	
June 9, 2012	(Denmark) Jesper Jørgensen	(Belgium) Gent	(Belgium) Club Brugge	± €1 500 000	
June 9, 2012	(France) Blanstel Koussalouka	(France) AS Monaco	(Belgium) Kortrijk	Undisclosed	
June 9, 2012	(Serbia) Stefan Mitrović	(Serbia) Metalac Gornji Milanovac	(Belgium) Kortrijk	Undisclosed	
June 10, 2012	(Belgium) Nick Van Belle	(Belgium) Club Brugge	(Belgium) Westerlo	Undisclosed	
June 10, 2012	(Belgium) Jonathan Wilmet	(Belgium) Mechelen	(Belgium) Westerlo	Undisclosed	
June 11, 2012	(Israel) Dudu Biton	(Belgium) Charleroi	(Belgium) Standard Liège	Undisclosed	(Note: Biton was on loan from Charleroi to Wisła Kraków, the loan ended but now he was sold to Standard Liège.)
June 11, 2012	(Belgium) Ludovic Buysens	(Belgium) Sint-Truiden	(Belgium) OH Leuven	Undisclosed	
June 11, 2012	(Bosnia and Herzegovina) Goran Galešić	(Slovenia) Gorica	(Belgium) Beerschot	Undisclosed	
June 11, 2012	(Belgium) Stijn Wuytens	(Netherlands) PSV	(Belgium) Beerschot	Undisclosed	
June 12, 2012	(Belgium) Bart Buysse	(Netherlands) Twente	(Belgium) Club Brugge	Undisclosed	
June 14, 2012	(Belgium) Colin Coosemans	(Belgium) Club Brugge	(Belgium) Waasland-Beveren	Loan	
June 14, 2012	(Belgium) Jonas De Roeck	(Germany) FC Augsburg	(Belgium) OH Leuven	Free	
June 14, 2012	(Belgium) Leroy Labylle	(Belgium) Standard Liège	(Netherlands) MVV	Undisclosed	(Note: Labylle was already on loan from Standard to MVV during the second half of the 2011-12 season. The transfer was now made permanent.)
June 15, 2012	(France) Cédric D'Ulivo	(France) Marseille	(Belgium) Waasland-Beveren	Undisclosed	
June 16, 2012	(Netherlands) Danny Verbeek	(Netherlands) Den Bosch	(Belgium) Standard Liège	Undisclosed	
June 17, 2012	(Belgium) Raf Verhamme	(Belgium) OH Leuven	(Belgium) Tienen	Free	(Note: Verhamme was on loan from OH Leuven to Olympia Wijgmaal during the 2011-12 season. The loan ended but he immediately transferred to Tienen.)
June 18, 2012	(Belgium) Maxime Annys	(Belgium) OH Leuven	(Belgium) Sint-Truiden	Free	
June 18, 2012	(Belgium) Daan van Gijseghem	(Belgium) Club Brugge	(Belgium) Mons	Undisclosed	
June 19, 2012	(Belgium) Siebe Blondelle	(Belgium) Mons	(Belgium) Waasland-Beveren	Free	
June 19, 2012	(Belgium) Rachid Farssi	(Belgium) Westerlo	(Belgium) Waasland-Beveren	Undisclosed	
June 19, 2012	(Denmark) Mads Junker	(Netherlands) Roda JC	(Belgium) Mechelen	Free	
June 19, 2012	(Burundi) Dugary Ndabashinze	(Belgium) Genk	(Belgium) Waasland-Beveren	Undisclosed	
June 20, 2012	(Brazil) Felipe	(Belgium) Standard Liège	(Germany) Hannover 96	Undisclosed	
June 20, 2012	(France) Steeven Joseph-Monrose	(Belgium) Kortrijk	(Belgium) Genk	Undisclosed	
June 21, 2012	(Denmark) Thomas Enevoldsen	(Netherlands) Groningen	(Belgium) Mechelen	Undisclosed	
June 21, 2012	(Belgium) Pietro Perdichizzi	(Belgium) Club Brugge	(Belgium) Zulte Waregem	Loan	
June 21, 2012	(Croatia) Matija Smrekar	(Belgium) Charleroi	Free Agent	Released	
June 21, 2012	(Belgium) Mohammed Tchité	(Belgium) Standard Liège	(Belgium) Club Brugge	Undisclosed	
June 22, 2012	(Belgium) Logan Bailly	(Germany) Borussia Mönchengladbach	(Belgium) OH Leuven	Undisclosed	
June 22, 2012	(Belgium) Enes Sağlık	(Belgium) Eupen	(Belgium) Lokeren	Free	
June 22, 2012	(Slovenia) Marko Šuler	(Belgium) Gent	(Poland) Legia Warsaw	Undisclosed	(Note: Šuler was on loan from Gent to Hapoel Tel Aviv during the second half of the 2011-12 season. The loan ended but he transferred to Legia Warsaw.)
June 25, 2012	(Hungary) Boldizsár Bodor	(Greece) OFI	(Belgium) Beerschot	Undisclosed	
June 26, 2012	(Democratic Republic of the Congo) Junior Kabananga	(Belgium) Anderlecht	(Belgium) Roeselare	Loan	
June 26, 2012	(Netherlands) Sherjill MacDonald	(Belgium) Beerschot	(United States) Chicago Fire	Undisclosed	
June 26, 2012	(France) Chris Makiese	(Belgium) Mons	(Belgium) Visé	Free	
June 27, 2012	(Belgium) Brandon Deville	(Belgium) Anderlecht	(France) Ajaccio	Undisclosed	
June 27, 2012	(Zimbabwe) Honour Gombami	(Belgium) Cercle Brugge	(Belgium) Antwerp	Free	
June 28, 2012	(Belgium) Arnor Angeli	(Belgium) Standard Liège	(Belgium) Mons	Undisclosed	(Note: Angeli was on loan from Standard Liège to Beerschot during the 2011-12 season. The loan ended but he was now sold to Mons.)
June 28, 2012	(Togo) Christophe Grondin	(Belgium) Gent	(Saudi Arabia) Al-Faisaly	Undisclosed	
June 28, 2012	(Belgium) Marvin Ogunjimi	(Spain) Mallorca	(Belgium) Standard Liège	Loan	
June 28, 2012	(Netherlands) Roel van Hemert	(Denmark) Hjørring	(Belgium) Waasland-Beveren	Undisclosed	
June 29, 2012	(Gabon) Frédéric Bulot	(France) Caen	(Belgium) Standard Liège	± €1 500 000	
June 29, 2012	(Colombia) Daniel Cruz	(United States) Dallas	(Belgium) Waasland-Beveren	Free	
June 29, 2012	(France) Kalidou Koulibaly	(France) Metz	(Belgium) Genk	Undisclosed	
June 29, 2012	(Democratic Republic of the Congo) Mulopo Kudimbana	(Belgium) Cercle Brugge	(Belgium) Oostende	Free	
June 29, 2012	(Belgium) Stefano Marzo	(Netherlands) PSV	(Belgium) Beerschot	Undisclosed	
June 29, 2012	(North Macedonia) Ivan Tričkovski	(Cyprus) APOEL	(Belgium) Club Brugge	± €1 000 000	
June 29, 2012	(Democratic Republic of the Congo) Bavon Tshibuabua	(Belgium) Beerschot	(Hungary) Újpest	Undisclosed	
June 30, 2012	(The Gambia) Ibou	(Belgium) Kortrijk	(Belgium) OH Leuven	Undisclosed	(Note: Ibou was on loan from Kortrijk to Mons during the 2011-12 season. The loan ended but he was now sold to OHL.)

=== July 2012 ===
Date	Name	Moving from	Moving to	Fee	Note
July 2, 2012	(Ivory Coast) Cyriac	(Belgium) Standard Liège	(Belgium) Anderlecht	€2 000 000	
July 2, 2012	(Belgium) Benoît Ladrière	(Belgium) Tubize	(Belgium) Waasland-Beveren	Undisclosed	
July 2, 2012	(Denmark) Nicklas Pedersen	(Netherlands) Groningen	(Belgium) Mechelen	Undisclosed	
July 3, 2012	(Sweden) Astrit Ajdarević	(Sweden) Norrköping	(Belgium) Standard Liège	Undisclosed	
July 5, 2012	(Senegal) Moussa Gueye	(Belgium) Charleroi	(France) Metz	Undisclosed	
July 5, 2012	(Belgium) Romeo Van Dessel	(Belgium) Mechelen	(Belgium) Dender EH	Undisclosed	(Note: Van Dessel was on loan from Mechelen to Antwerp during the 2011-12 season. The loan ended but he was now sold to Dender.)
July 6, 2012	(Costa Rica) Júnior Díaz	(Belgium) Club Brugge	(Germany) 1. FSV Mainz 05	Undisclosed	(Note: Díaz was on loan from Club Brugge to Wisła Kraków during the 2011-12 season. The loan ended but he was now sold to Mainz.)
July 7, 2012	(Belgium) Junior Malanda	(France) Lille	(Belgium) Zulte Waregem	Undisclosed	
July 10, 2012	(Belgium) Karim Tarfi	(Belgium) Anderlecht	(Netherlands) De Graafschap	Loan	
July 11, 2012	(Iceland) Birkir Bjarnason	(Belgium) Standard Liège	(Italy) Pescara	Loan	
July 11, 2012	(Bosnia and Herzegovina) Adnan Čustović	(Belgium) Beerschot	(Belgium) Tournai	Free	(Note: Čustović was on loan from Beerschot to Mouscron-Péruwelz during the second half of the 2011-12 season. The loan ended but he was now released to Tournai.)
July 11, 2012	(Belgium) Yassine El Ghanassy	(Belgium) Gent	(England) West Bromwich Albion	Loan	
July 11, 2012	(Denmark) Jim Larsen	(Norway) Rosenborg	(Belgium) Club Brugge	Undisclosed	
July 11, 2012	(Belgium) Franco Zennaro	(Belgium) Standard Liège	(Belgium) Waasland-Beveren	Loan	
July 13, 2012	(Japan) Eiji Kawashima	(Belgium) Lierse	(Belgium) Standard Liège	Undisclosed	
July 13, 2012	(Belgium) Jonas Laureys	(Belgium) Mechelen	(Belgium) Westerlo	Loan	
July 13, 2012	(Senegal) Papa Sene	(Belgium) Cercle Brugge	(Belgium) Roeselare	Loan	(Note: Sene was already on loan from Cercle Brugge to Roeselare during the 2011-12 season. The loan ended but was extended for another season.)
July 14, 2012	(Belgium) Andréa Mbuyi-Mutombo	(Belgium) Cercle Brugge	(Croatia) Rijeka	Free	
July 14, 2012	(Belgium) Lucas Walbrecq	(Belgium) Standard Liège	(Belgium) Genk	Undisclosed	
July 17, 2012	(France) Karim Belhocine	(Belgium) Standard Liège	(Belgium) Waasland-Beveren	Undisclosed	
July 18, 2012	(Brazil) Marcos Camozzato	(Belgium) Club Brugge	Free Agent	Contract Annulled	
July 18, 2012	(Ghana) Ibrahim Salou	(Belgium) OH Leuven	(Belgium) La Louvière Centre	Free	
July 19, 2012	(Netherlands) Jeremy Bokila	(Belgium) Zulte Waregem	(Romania) Petrolul Ploiești	Loan	
July 19, 2012	(France) Rachid Bourabia	(Belgium) Mons	(Belgium) Lierse	Undisclosed	
July 19, 2012	(Burkina Faso) Daouda Diakité	(Belgium) Turnhout	(Belgium) Lierse	Undisclosed	
July 19, 2012	(Croatia) Paolo Grbac	(Croatia) NK Istra	(Belgium) Lokeren	Undisclosed	
July 19, 2012	(Belgium) Dolly Menga	(Belgium) Standard Liège	(Belgium) Lierse	Undisclosed	(Note: Menga was on loan from Standard Liège to Sint-Truiden during the 2011-12 season. The loan ended but he was now sold to Lierse.)
July 20, 2012	(Spain) Jordan Garcia-Calvete	(Belgium) Anderlecht	(Netherlands) De Graafschap	Loan	
July 20, 2012	(Slovenia) Zlatan Ljubijankič	(Belgium) Gent	(Japan) Omiya Ardija	Undisclosed	
July 20, 2012	(Belgium) Jordan Remacle	(Belgium) OH Leuven	(Belgium) Gent	Undisclosed	
July 20, 2012	(Netherlands) Bas Sibum	(Germany) Alemannia Aachen	(Belgium) Waasland-Beveren	Undisclosed	
July 21, 2012	(Serbia) Miloš Marić	(Belgium) Lierse	(Belgium) Lokeren	Undisclosed	
July 21, 2012	(Belgium) Evariste Ngolok	(Belgium) Westerlo	(Belgium) OH Leuven	Undisclosed	
July 23, 2012	(Czech Republic) Marcel Gecov	(England) Fulham	(Belgium) Gent	Undisclosed	
July 23, 2012	(Israel) Yadin Zaris	(Israel) Maccabi Herzliya	(Belgium) Standard Liège	Undisclosed	(Note: Immediately after signing Zaris from Maccabi Herzliya, Standard loaned him out to Újpest.)
July 24, 2012	(Portugal) Yohan Tavares	(Portugal) Beira-Mar	(Belgium) Standard Liège	Undisclosed	
July 25, 2012	(France) Teddy Chevalier	(Belgium) Zulte Waregem	(Netherlands) RKC	Undisclosed	
July 25, 2012	(Slovenia) Uroš Palibrk	(Italy) Milan	(Belgium) Lierse	Loan	
July 26, 2012	(Spain) Daniel Fernández	(Netherlands) Feyenoord	(Belgium) Genk	Free	
July 27, 2012	(Palestine) Omar Jarun	(Poland) Arka Gdynia	(Belgium) Charleroi	Undisclosed	
July 27, 2012	(Ghana) Bennard Kumordzi	(France) Dijon	(Belgium) Genk	Undisclosed	
July 27, 2012	(Egypt) Ahmed Said	(Egypt) Wadi Degla	(Belgium) Lierse	Loan	
July 31, 2012	(Argentina) Abel Masuero	(Belgium) Genk	(Argentina) San Lorenzo	Loan	

=== August 2012 ===
Date	Name	Moving from	Moving to	Fee	Note
August 1, 2012	(Bolivia) Vicente Arze	(Hungary) Diósgyőri	(Belgium) Charleroi	Undisclosed	
August 1, 2012	(Costa Rica) Mynor Escoe	(Costa Rica) Deportivo Saprissa	(Belgium) Charleroi	Loan	
August 1, 2012	(Belgium) Kristof Van Hout	(Belgium) Kortrijk	(Belgium) Genk	Undisclosed	
August 2, 2012	(Morocco) Abdelfettah Boukhriss	(Belgium) Standard Liège	(Morocco) Raja Casablanca	Undisclosed	
August 3, 2012	(France) Rémi Pillot	(France) Nancy	(Belgium) Kortrijk	Free	
August 3, 2012	(Slovenia) Vito Plut	(Slovenia) Gorica	(Belgium) Waasland-Beveren	Undisclosed	
August 5, 2012	(Belgium) Sepp De Roover	(Belgium) Lokeren	(Netherlands) NAC	Loan	
August 6, 2012	(France) Francis N'Ganga	(France) Tours	(Belgium) Charleroi	Free	
August 7, 2012	(Spain) Pau Cendrós López	(Spain) Mallorca	(Belgium) Gent	Undisclosed	
August 8, 2012	(Belgium) Nicky Hayen	(Belgium) OH Leuven	(Belgium) Antwerp	Loan	
August 8, 2012	(Belgium) Kevin Roelandts	(Belgium) OH Leuven	(Belgium) Antwerp	Loan	
August 8, 2012	(Belgium) Jorn Vermeulen	(Belgium) OH Leuven	(Belgium) Antwerp	Loan	
August 9, 2012	(Belgium) Axel Bonemme	(Belgium) Standard Liège	(Belgium) Sint-Truiden	Loan	
August 9, 2012	(Israel) Steven Cohen	(Israel) Beitar Jerusalem	(Belgium) Waasland-Beveren	Undisclosed	
August 9, 2012	(Senegal) Baye Djiby Fall	(Belgium) Lokeren	(Germany) Greuther Fürth	Undisclosed	
August 9, 2012	(Cameroon) Christian Pouga	(Portugal) Marítimo	(Belgium) OH Leuven	Undisclosed	
August 10, 2012	(France) Flavien Le Postollec	(Belgium) Eupen	(Belgium) Mons	Free	
August 11, 2012	(France) Stéphane Coqu	(Belgium) Charleroi	(Belgium) Brussels	Free	
August 11, 2012	(Belgium) Joeri Dequevy	(Belgium) Lierse	(Belgium) Sint-Truiden	Undisclosed	
August 13, 2012	(Belarus) Mikhail Sivakov	(Belgium) Zulte Waregem	(Belarus) BATE Borisov	Loan	
August 15, 2012	(Belgium) Fries Deschilder	(Belgium) Club Brugge	(Netherlands) FC Eindhoven	Loan	
August 15, 2012	(France) Aliou Dia	(Belgium) Mons	(Belgium) Brussels	Undisclosed	
August 15, 2012	(Belgium) Maxime Gunst	(Belgium) Club Brugge	(Belgium) Eendracht Aalst	Loan	
August 16, 2012	(Bosnia and Herzegovina) Mario Barić	(Belgium) Gent	Free Agent	Released	
August 16, 2012	(Iceland) Alfreð Finnbogason	(Belgium) Lokeren	(Netherlands) Heerenveen	Undisclosed	(Note: First it was reported that Finnbogason, who was already on loan from Lokeren to Helsingborg, would move on a permanent basis to the latter as both clubs agreed on a transfer sum to make the move permanent. However, a few days later news was released that Finnbogason would instead move to Heerenveen.)
August 16, 2012	(Israel) Gal Shish	(Israel) Hapoel Tel Aviv	(Belgium) Waasland-Beveren	Undisclosed	
August 17, 2012	(Cameroon) Dorge Kouemaha	(Belgium) Club Brugge	(Germany) Eintracht Frankfurt	Loan	(Note: Kouemaha was on loan from Club Brugge to Kaiserslautern during the 2011-12 season. The loan ended, but now he was loaned out to Frankfurt.)
August 17, 2012	(Belgium) Christophe Lepoint	(Belgium) Gent	(Belgium) Waasland-Beveren	Loan	
August 17, 2012	(Netherlands) Danny Verbeek	(Belgium) Standard Liège	(Netherlands) NAC	Loan	
August 21, 2012	(Norway) Mushaga Bakenga	(Belgium) Club Brugge	(Belgium) Cercle Brugge	Loan	
August 21, 2012	(Belgium) Igor Vetokele	(Belgium) Cercle Brugge	(Denmark) Copenhagen	Undisclosed	
August 22, 2012	(Sweden) Magnus Eriksson	(Sweden) Åtvidaberg	(Belgium) Gent	Undisclosed	
August 23, 2012	(Nigeria) Joseph Akpala	(Belgium) Club Brugge	(Germany) Werder Bremen	Undisclosed	
August 23, 2012	(England) Zeki Fryers	(England) Manchester United	(Belgium) Standard Liège	Free	
August 23, 2012	(Israel) Mohammad Ghadir	(Israel) Maccabi Haifa	(Belgium) Waasland-Beveren	Loan	
August 24, 2012	(Belgium) Geoffrey Mujangi Bia	(Belgium) Standard Liège	(England) Watford	Loan	
August 24, 2012	(Belgium) Yannick Nulens	(Belgium) Anderlecht	(Belgium) Sint-Truiden	Loan	
August 24, 2012	(Belgium) Kevin Vandenbergh	(Belgium) Mechelen	(Belgium) Westerlo	Undisclosed	
August 28, 2012	(Spain) Raúl Bravo	(Spain) Rayo Vallecano	(Belgium) Beerschot	Free	
August 28, 2012	(Democratic Republic of the Congo) Trésor Diowo	(Belgium) Beerschot	(Belgium) WS Woluwe	Loan	
August 28, 2012	(Iceland) Jón Guðni Fjóluson	(Belgium) Beerschot	(Sweden) Sundsvall	Undisclosed	
August 28, 2012	(Finland) Roni Porokara	(Belgium) Beerschot	(Israel) Ironi Kiryat Shmona	Undisclosed	
August 29, 2012	(Czech Republic) Lukáš Mareček	(Belgium) Anderlecht	(Netherlands) Heerenveen	Loan	
August 30, 2012	(Israel) Barak Badash	(Israel) Ironi Kiryat Shmona	(Belgium) Waasland-Beveren	Loan	
August 30, 2012	(Belgium) Abdelhakim Bouhna	(Belgium) Anderlecht	(Belgium) Roeselare	Loan	
August 30, 2012	(Tunisia) Fabien Camus	(Belgium) Genk	(France) Troyes	Loan	
August 30, 2012	(Belgium) Jimmy De Jonghe	(Belgium) Club Brugge	(Belgium) Zulte Waregem	Loan	
August 30, 2012	(Belgium) Thorgan Hazard	(England) Chelsea	(Belgium) Zulte Waregem	Loan	
August 30, 2012	(Zimbabwe) Ovidy Karuru	(France) Boulogne	(Belgium) OH Leuven	Undisclosed	
August 30, 2012	(Democratic Republic of the Congo) Jean-Paul Kielo-Lezi	(Belgium) Waasland-Beveren	(Belgium) Deinze	Free	
August 30, 2012	(Uruguay) Guillermo Mendez	(Uruguay) Nacional	(Belgium) Standard Liège	Free	
August 30, 2012	(Belgium) Antoine Palate	(Belgium) OH Leuven	(Belgium) Diegem Sport	Loan	
August 30, 2012	(Brazil) Luiz Silva	(Brazil) Desportivo Brasil	(Belgium) Standard Liège	Loan	
August 31, 2012	(Belgium) Mohammed Aoulad	(Belgium) Anderlecht	(Belgium) Charleroi	Loan	
August 31, 2012	(Belgium) Ziguy Badibanga	(Belgium) Anderlecht	(Belgium) Charleroi	Loan	
August 31, 2012	(Belgium) Bruno Baras	(Belgium) Anderlecht	(Belgium) Brussels	Loan	
August 31, 2012	(Belgium) Christian Benteke	(Belgium) Genk	(England) Aston Villa	€10 000 000	
August 31, 2012	(Peru) Iván Bulos	(Peru) Sporting Cristal	(Belgium) Standard Liège	Undisclosed	(Note: Immediately after signing Bulos from Sporting Cristal, Standard loaned him out to Sint-Truiden.)
August 31, 2012	(Argentina) Pablo Chavarría	(Belgium) Anderlecht	(Belgium) Kortrijk	Loan	
August 31, 2012	(Hungary) Péter Czvitkovics	(Belgium) Kortrijk	(Hungary) Debrecen	Undisclosed	
August 31, 2012	(Belgium) Koen Daerden	(Belgium) Standard Liège	Free Agent	Released	
August 31, 2012	(Belgium) Benjamin De Ceulaer	(Belgium) Lokeren	(Belgium) Genk	Undisclosed	
August 31, 2012	(Senegal) Christophe Diandy	(Belgium) Anderlecht	(Belgium) Charleroi	Loan	
August 31, 2012	(Belgium) Bruno Godeau	(Belgium) Anderlecht	(Belgium) Zulte Waregem	Loan	
August 31, 2012	(Belgium) Frédéric Gounongbe	(Belgium) Zulte Waregem	(Belgium) Brussels	Loan	
August 31, 2012	(Denmark) Brian Hamalainen	(Belgium) Zulte Waregem	(Belgium) Genk	Undisclosed	
August 31, 2012	(Belgium) Gertjan Martens	(Belgium) Waasland-Beveren	(Belgium) Oostende	Loan	
August 31, 2012	(Democratic Republic of the Congo) Chancel Mbemba	(Democratic Republic of the Congo) FC MK	(Belgium) Anderlecht	Undisclosed	
August 31, 2012	(Netherlands) Bram Nuytinck	(Netherlands) NEC	(Belgium) Anderlecht	Undisclosed	
August 31, 2012	(Kenya) Johanna Omolo	(Belgium) Beerschot	(Belgium) Lommel	Loan	
August 31, 2012	(Netherlands) Glynor Plet	(Netherlands) Twente	(Belgium) Genk	Loan	
August 31, 2012	(Belgium) Giuseppe Rossini	(Belgium) Zulte Waregem	(Belgium) Charleroi	Undisclosed	
August 31, 2012	(Poland) Grzegorz Sandomierski	(Belgium) Genk	(England) Blackburn Rovers	Loan	
August 31, 2012	(Senegal) Abdoulaye Seck	(Belgium) Anderlecht	(Belgium) Brussels	Loan	
August 31, 2012	(Belgium) Kristof Snelders	(Belgium) Waasland-Beveren	(Belgium) Cappellen	Undisclosed	
August 31, 2012	(Belgium) Bryan Verboom	(Belgium) Anderlecht	(Belgium) Zulte Waregem	Loan	
August 31, 2012	(Belgium) Jonathan Vervoort	(Belgium) Anderlecht	(Netherlands) FC Eindhoven	Loan	
August 31, 2012	(Serbia) Dalibor Veselinović	(Belgium) Anderlecht	(Belgium) Beerschot	Loan	
August 31, 2012	(Belgium) Bigen Yala-Lusala	(Belgium) Anderlecht	(Belgium) WS Woluwe	Loan	

== Sorted by team ==
=== Anderlecht ===
In:

No.	Pos.	Nation	Player
4	DF	KSA	Osama Hawsawi (from (Saudi Arabia) Al-Hilal FC)
13	GK	BEL	Thomas Kaminski (from (Belgium) OH Leuven)
14	DF	NED	Bram Nuytinck (from (Netherlands) NEC)
15	FW	CIV	Cyriac (from (Belgium) Standard Liège)
17	MF	UKR	Sacha Iakovenko (loan return from (Belgium) OH Leuven)
36	FW	BEL	Nathan Kabasele (loan return from (Belgium) Westerlo)
41	MF	BEL	René Sterckx (loan return from (Belgium) Zulte Waregem)
77	MF	BRA	Reynaldo (loan return from (Belgium) Westerlo)
—	FW	COD	Chancel Mbemba (from (Democratic Republic of the Congo) FC MK)

Out:

No.	Pos.	Nation	Player
14	FW	COD	Patou Kabangu (released)
18	MF	CZE	Lukáš Mareček (on loan to (Netherlands) Heerenveen)
22	GK	BEL	Davy Schollen (to (Belgium) Sint-Truiden)
25	FW	ARG	Pablo Chavarría (again on loan to (Belgium) Kortrijk)
28	GK	BEL	Michaël Cordier (to (Belgium) Westerlo)
87	FW	SRB	Dalibor Veselinović (loan return from (Belgium) Kortrijk, now on loan to (Belgium) Beerschot)
—	FW	BEL	Mohammed Aoulad (from (Belgium) Brussels, now on loan to (Belgium) Charleroi)
—	FW	BEL	Ziguy Badibanga (on loan to (Belgium) Charleroi)
—	FW	BEL	Bruno Baras (on loan to (Belgium) Brussels)
—	MF	BEL	Abdelhakim Bouhna (from (Belgium) Diegem, now on loan to (Belgium) Roeselare)
—	MF	BEL	Thomas Chatelle (loan return from (Belgium) Sint-Truiden, then released after his contract ended)
—	MF	BEL	Brandon Deville (to (France) Ajaccio)
—	MF	SEN	Christophe Diandy (loan return from (Belgium) OH Leuven, now on loan to (Belgium) Charleroi)
—	MF	ESP	Jordan Garcia-Calvete (on loan to (Netherlands) De Graafschap)
—	DF	BEL	Bruno Godeau (on loan to (Belgium) Zulte Waregem)
—	FW	COD	Junior Kabananga (on loan to (Belgium) Roeselare)
—	MF	BEL	Charly Junior Musonda (to (England) Chelsea)
—	MF	BEL	Lamisha Musonda (to (England) Chelsea)
—	MF	BEL	Tika Musonda (to (England) Chelsea)
—	MF	BEL	Yannick Nulens (on loan to (Belgium) Sint-Truiden)
—	DF	SEN	Abdoulaye Seck (on loan to (Belgium) Brussels)
—	MF	BEL	Karim Tarfi (on loan to (Netherlands) De Graafschap)
—	DF	BEL	Bryan Verboom (on loan to (Belgium) Zulte Waregem)
—	DF	BEL	Jonathan Vervoort (on loan to (Netherlands) FC Eindhoven)
—	MF	BEL	Bigen Yala-Lusala (was on loan to (Belgium) Lokeren, now loaned to (Belgium) WS Woluwe)

=== Beerschot ===
In:

No.	Pos.	Nation	Player
2	DF	BEL	Stefano Marzo (from (Netherlands) PSV)
4	DF	FRA	Frédéric Brillant (from (Belgium) Oostende)
7	MF	BIH	Goran Galešić (from (Slovenia) Gorica)
10	MF	BEL	Joachim Mununga (from (Turkey) Gençlerbirliği)
14	FW	SEN	Elimane Coulibaly (from (Belgium) Gent)
15	MF	BEL	Stijn Wuytens (from (Netherlands) PSV)
20	GK	BEL	Koen Vanlangendonck (from (Belgium) Bocholt)
23	MF	BEL	Funso Ojo (from (Netherlands) PSV)
27	DF	HUN	Boldizsár Bodor (from (Greece) OFI)
30	GK	BEL	Stefan Deloose (from (Belgium) Lokeren)
—	DF	ESP	Raúl Bravo (from (Spain) Rayo Vallecano)
—	FW	SRB	Dalibor Veselinović (on loan from (Belgium) Anderlecht)

Out:

No.	Pos.	Nation	Player
1	GK	MKD	Tomislav Pačovski (to (Belgium) Mechelen)
2	DF	COD	Trésor Diowo (on loan to (Belgium) WS Woluwe)
5	DF	ISL	Jón Guðni Fjóluson (to (Sweden) Sundsvall)
8	FW	NED	Sherjill MacDonald (to (United States) Chicago Fire)
12	MF	KEN	Johanna Omolo (on loan to (Belgium) Lommel)
20	GK	BEL	Kristof Maes (to (Belgium) Gent)
33	DF	FIN	Roni Porokara (to (Israel) Ironi Kiryat Shmona)
35	DF	BEL	Peter Van Der Heyden (released)
37	MF	BEL	Arnor Angeli (loan return to (Belgium) Standard Liège, who sold him to (Belgium) Mons)
—	FW	BIH	Adnan Čustović (was on loan to (Belgium) Mouscron-Péruwelz, now released to (Belgium) Tournai)
—	FW	COD	Bavon Tshibuabua (to (Hungary) Újpest)

=== Cercle Brugge ===
In:

No.	Pos.	Nation	Player
2	DF	BEL	Koenraad Hendrickx (from (Belgium) Gent)
7	MF	BEL	Tim Smolders (from (Belgium) Gent)
16	GK	NED	Mitchell Braafhart (from (Netherlands) Zaamslag)
—	FW	NOR	Mushaga Bakenga (on loan from (Belgium) Club Brugge)
—	FW	NGR	Michael Uchebo (from (Netherlands) VVV)
—	DF	BEL	Stef Wils (from (Belgium) Westerlo)

Out:

No.	Pos.	Nation	Player
10	DF	POR	Nuno Reis (loan return to (Portugal) Sporting Lisbon)
11	FW	BEL	Igor Vetokele (to (Denmark) Copenhagen)
16	GK	COD	Mulopo Kudimbana (to (Belgium) Oostende)
19	FW	POR	Amido Baldé (loan return to (Portugal) Sporting Lisbon)
90	FW	BEL	Andréa Mbuyi-Mutombo (to (Croatia) Rijeka)
—	FW	ZIM	Honour Gombami (to (Belgium) Antwerp)
—	MF	BEL	Jonas Buyse (on loan to (Belgium) Wetteren)
—	MF	NED	Luciano Dompig (end of contract)
—	MF	BEL	Kevin Packet (on loan to (Belgium) Wetteren)
—	FW	SEN	Papa Sene (on loan to (Belgium) Roeselare)
—	MF	BEL	Tony Sergeant (retires)

=== Charleroi ===
In:

No.	Pos.	Nation	Player
9	DF	BOL	Vicente Arze (from (Hungary) Diósgyőri)
99	DF	CRC	Mynor Escoe (on loan from (Costa Rica) Deportivo Saprissa)
—	FW	BEL	Mohammed Aoulad (on loan from (Belgium) Anderlecht)
—	FW	BEL	Ziguy Badibanga (on loan from (Belgium) Anderlecht)
—	MF	SEN	Christophe Diandy (on loan from (Belgium) Anderlecht)
—	DF	PLE	Omar Jarun (from (Poland) Arka Gdynia)
—	DF	FRA	Francis N'Ganga (from (France) Tours)
—	FW	BEL	Giuseppe Rossini (from (Belgium) Zulte Waregem)

Out:

No.	Pos.	Nation	Player
18	FW	SEN	Moussa Gueye (to (France) Metz)
26	DF	BEL	Christopher Verbist (loan return to (Belgium) Standard Liège, who sold him to (Belgium) OH Leuven)
—	FW	ISR	Dudu Biton (was on loan to (Poland) Wisła Kraków, now sold to (Belgium) Standard Liège)
—	GK	FRA	Stéphane Coqu (to (Belgium) Brussels)
—	FW	CRO	Matija Smrekar (released)
—	FW	FIN	Hermanni Vuorinen (released)

=== Club Brugge ===
In:

No.	Pos.	Nation	Player
7	FW	BEL	Mohammed Tchité (from (Belgium) Standard Liège)
10	MF	DEN	Jesper Jørgensen (from (Belgium) Gent)
14	DF	DEN	Jim Larsen (from (Norway) Rosenborg)
17	FW	MKD	Ivan Tričkovski (from (Cyprus) APOEL)
21	DF	BEL	Bart Buysse (from (Netherlands) Twente)

Out:

No.	Pos.	Nation	Player
1	GK	BEL	Colin Coosemans (on loan to (Belgium) Waasland-Beveren)
15	FW	NOR	Mushaga Bakenga (on loan to (Belgium) Cercle Brugge)
17	DF	BRA	Marcos Camozzato (released)
21	DF	BEL	Pietro Perdichizzi (on loan to (Belgium) Zulte Waregem)
24	DF	BEL	Daan van Gijseghem (to (Belgium) Mons)
25	FW	NGR	Joseph Akpala (to (Germany) Werder Bremen)
26	MF	BEL	Fries Deschilder (on loan to (Netherlands) FC Eindhoven)
27	DF	BEL	Jimmy De Jonghe (on loan to (Belgium) Zulte Waregem)
30	FW	BEL	Nick Van Belle (to (Belgium) Westerlo)
—	DF	BEL	Maxime Gunst (on loan to (Belgium) Eendracht Aalst)
—	DF	CRC	Júnior Díaz (was on loan to (Poland) Wisła Kraków, now sold to (Germany) 1. FSV Mainz 05)
—	FW	CMR	Dorge Kouemaha (was on loan to (Germany) 1. FC Kaiserslautern, now loaned to (Germany) Eintracht Frankfurt)

=== Genk ===
In:

No.	Pos.	Nation	Player
5	DF	FRA	Kalidou Koulibaly (from (France) Metz)
8	FW	FRA	Steeven Joseph-Monrose (from (Belgium) Kortrijk)
10	MF	FRA	Julien Gorius (from (Belgium) Mechelen)
21	DF	ESP	Daniel Fernández (from (Netherlands) Feyenoord)
22	GK	BEL	Kristof Van Hout (from (Belgium) Kortrijk)
45	MF	GHA	Bennard Kumordzi (from (France) Dijon)
8	DF	DEN	Brian Hamalainen (from (Belgium) Zulte Waregem)
—	FW	BEL	Benjamin De Ceulaer (from (Belgium) Lokeren)
—	FW	NED	Glynor Plet (on loan from (Netherlands) Twente)
—	MF	BEL	Lucas Walbrecq (from (Belgium) Standard Liège)

Out:

No.	Pos.	Nation	Player
1	GK	POL	Grzegorz Sandomierski (loan return from (Poland) Jagiellonia Białystok, then loaned to (England) Blackburn Rovers)
2	DF	ARG	Abel Masuero (on loan to (Argentina) San Lorenzo)
8	MF	HUN	Dániel Tőzsér (to (Italy) Genoa)
14	MF	BEL	Kevin De Bruyne (loan return to (England) Chelsea)
15	MF	TUN	Fabien Camus (on loan to (France) Troyes)
21	MF	BDI	Dugary Ndabashinze (to (Belgium) Waasland-Beveren)
23	GK	BEL	Logan Bailly (loan return to (Germany) Borussia Mönchengladbach, who sold him to (Belgium) OH Leuven)
25	FW	BEL	Christian Benteke (to (England) Aston Villa)
32	GK	BEL	Gilles Lentz (to (Belgium) Roeselare)

=== Gent ===
In:

No.	Pos.	Nation	Player
2	DF	ESP	Pau Cendrós López (from (Spain) Mallorca)
3	MF	CZE	Marcel Gecov (from (England) Fulham)
4	DF	BEL	Wouter Corstjens (from (Belgium) Westerlo)
10	FW	ISR	Shlomi Arbeitman (loan return from (Belgium) Westerlo)
11	MF	BEL	Jordan Remacle (from (Belgium) OH Leuven)
16	FW	ZAM	Rodgers Kola (from (Israel) Ashdod)
20	GK	BEL	Kristof Maes (from (Belgium) Beerschot)
21	MF	BEL	Mohamed Messoudi (from (Belgium) Kortrijk)
32	MF	BEL	Thomas Foket (from (Belgium) Dilbeek)
—	FW	SWE	Magnus Eriksson (from (Sweden) Åtvidaberg)

Out:

No.	Pos.	Nation	Player
4	DF	CRC	Roy Myrie (to (Costa Rica) Uruguay de Coronado)
7	MF	BEL	Tim Smolders (to (Belgium) Cercle Brugge)
10	MF	DEN	Jesper Jørgensen (to (Belgium) Club Brugge)
11	MF	BEL	Yassine El Ghanassy (on loan to (England) West Bromwich Albion)
14	DF	BIH	Mario Barić (released)
16	FW	SEN	Elimane Coulibaly (to (Belgium) Beerschot)
20	GK	BEL	Sébastien Bruzzese (to (Belgium) Zulte Waregem)
21	MF	USA	Mikkel Diskerud (loan return to (Norway) Stabæk)
26	MF	BEL	Christophe Lepoint (on loan to (Belgium) Waasland-Beveren)
30	FW	SLO	Zlatan Ljubijankič (to (Japan) Omiya Ardija)
31	MF	TOG	Christophe Grondin (to (Saudi Arabia) Al-Faisaly)
—	DF	BEL	Koenraad Hendrickx (to (Belgium) Cercle Brugge)
—	DF	BEL	Jef Vogels (to (Belgium) Rupel Boom)
—	DF	SLO	Marko Šuler (was on loan to (Israel) Hapoel Tel Aviv, now sold to (Poland) Legia Warsaw)

=== Kortrijk ===
In:

No.	Pos.	Nation	Player
1	GK	FRA	Rémi Pillot (from (France) Nancy)
9	FW	FRA	Kévin Dupuis (from (France) Châteauroux)
18	FW	ARG	Pablo Chavarría (again on loan from (Belgium) Anderlecht)
20	MF	BEL	Thomas Matton (from (Belgium) Zulte Waregem)
22	FW	FRA	Jimmy Kamghain (from (France) Paris Saint-Germain)
24	MF	FRA	Blanstel Koussalouka (from (France) AS Monaco)
25	DF	SRB	Stefan Mitrović (from (Serbia) Metalac Gornji Milanovac)
29	DF	FRA	Romain Reynaud (from (France) Châteauroux)

Out:

No.	Pos.	Nation	Player
1	GK	BEL	Kristof Van Hout (to (Belgium) Genk)
2	MF	BEL	David Vandenbroeck (loan return to (Belgium) Zulte Waregem)
7	FW	FRA	Steeven Joseph-Monrose (to (Belgium) Genk)
9	FW	SRB	Dalibor Veselinović (loan return to (Belgium) Anderlecht)
20	MF	BEL	Mohamed Messoudi (to (Belgium) Gent)
77	MF	HUN	Péter Czvitkovics (to (Hungary) Debrecen)
—	FW	GAM	Ibou (was on loan to (Belgium) Mons, now sold to (Belgium) OH Leuven)

=== Lierse ===
In:

No.	Pos.	Nation	Player
3	DF	BEL	Lennert Vanherberghen (from (Belgium) Tienen)
4	DF	NED	Arjan Swinkels (from (Netherlands) Willem II)
5	DF	BEL	Jonas Heymans (from (Belgium) Wetteren)
13	DF	EGY	Ahmed Said (on loan from (Egypt) Wadi Degla)
19	MF	BEL	Benjamin Lambot (from (Belgium) Antwerp)
22	GK	BFA	Daouda Diakité (from (Belgium) Turnhout)
23	FW	EGY	Ahmed Samir Farag (from (Egypt) Ismaily)
24	FW	BUL	Kostadin Hazurov (from (Israel) Bnei Sakhnin)
25	MF	FRA	Rachid Bourabia (from (Belgium) Mons)
33	FW	BEL	Dolly Menga (from (Belgium) Standard Liège)
37	FW	SLO	Uroš Palibrk (on loan from (Italy) Milan)

Out:

No.	Pos.	Nation	Player
1	GK	JPN	Eiji Kawashima (to (Belgium) Standard Liège)
4	DF	BEL	Kenny Thompson (to (Belgium) OH Leuven)
6	MF	BEL	Joeri Dequevy (to (Belgium) Sint-Truiden)
10	FW	BEL	Wesley Sonck (end of contract)
11	DF	BEL	Gonzague Vandooren (end of contract)
20	DF	NOR	Alexander Mathisen (end of contract)
33	MF	SRB	Miloš Marić (to (Belgium) Lokeren)
—	GK	BEL	Stefan Deloose (to (Belgium) Beerschot)

=== Lokeren ===
In:

No.	Pos.	Nation	Player
17	MF	SRB	Miloš Marić (from (Belgium) Lierse)
20	MF	BEL	Enes Sağlık (from (Belgium) Eupen)
22	MF	CRO	Paolo Grbac (from (Croatia) NK Istra)
30	GK	BEL	Nicolas Lemaire (from (Belgium) Mons)
—	MF	RSA	Sherwin Bailey (from (South Africa) ASD Cape Town)

Out:

No.	Pos.	Nation	Player
2	DF	BEL	Sepp De Roover (on loan to (Netherlands) NAC)
11	FW	BEL	Benjamin De Ceulaer (to (Belgium) Genk)
17	MF	NOR	Geir Ludvig Fevang (to (Norway) Haugesund)
18	FW	SEN	Baye Djiby Fall (to (Germany) Greuther Fürth)
20	FW	NED	Donovan Deekman (to (Netherlands) Sparta)
21	FW	ISL	Alfreð Finnbogason (was on loan to (Sweden) Helsingborg, now sold to (Netherlands) Heerenveen)
—	MF	BEL	Bigen Yala-Lusala (loan return to (Belgium) Anderlecht)

=== Mechelen ===
In:

No.	Pos.	Nation	Player
9	FW	DEN	Mads Junker (from (Netherlands) Roda JC)
12	MF	BEL	Steven De Petter (from (Belgium) Westerlo)
14	FW	DEN	Nicklas Pedersen (from (Netherlands) Groningen)
15	MF	DEN	Thomas Enevoldsen (from (Netherlands) Groningen)
23	GK	MKD	Tomislav Pačovski (from (Belgium) Beerschot AC)
24	MF	BEL	Joachim Van Damme (from (Belgium) Waasland-Beveren)

Out:

No.	Pos.	Nation	Player
9	MF	BEL	Jonathan Wilmet (to (Belgium) Westerlo)
11	FW	BEL	Kevin Vandenbergh (to (Belgium) Westerlo)
15	MF	FRA	Julien Gorius (to (Belgium) Genk)
16	MF	BEL	Kevin Geudens (to (Belgium) Westerlo)
17	FW	ROU	Denis Alibec (loan return to (Italy) Inter Milan)
50	GK	COD	Yves Ma-Kalambay (released)
—	FW	BFA	Pierre Koulibaly (was on loan to (Belgium) Sint-Niklaas, now released to (Belgium) Montegnée)
—	MF	BEL	Jonas Laureys (on loan to (Belgium) Westerlo)
—	DF	BEL	Tom Pietermaat (was on loan to (Belgium) Rupel Boom, now loaned to (Belgium) Eendracht Aalst)
—	MF	BEL	Romeo Van Dessel (was on loan to (Belgium) Antwerp, now sold to (Belgium) Dender EH)

=== Mons ===
In:

No.	Pos.	Nation	Player
15	DF	BEL	Daan van Gijseghem (from (Belgium) Club Brugge)
16	FW	GER	Bahattin Köse (from (Germany) Arminia Bielefeld)
25	FW	BEL	Arnaud Biatour (from (Belgium) Tienen)
27	MF	BEL	Arnor Angeli (from (Belgium) Standard Liège)
94	DF	FRA	Kieran Felix (from (Belgium) Mouscron-Péruwelz)
—	MF	FRA	Flavien Le Postollec (from (Belgium) Eupen)

Out:

No.	Pos.	Nation	Player
3	DF	BEL	Siebe Blondelle (to (Belgium) Waasland-Beveren)
12	FW	GAM	Ibou (loan return to (Belgium) Kortrijk, who sold him to (Belgium) OH Leuven)
15	DF	FRA	Aliou Dia (to (Belgium) Brussels)
23	MF	FRA	Rachid Bourabia (to (Belgium) Lierse)
78	FW	FRA	Chris Makiese (to (Belgium) Visé)
—	GK	BEL	Nicolas Lemaire (to (Belgium) Lokeren)

=== OH Leuven ===
In:

No.	Pos.	Nation	Player
5	DF	BEL	Kenny Thompson (from (Belgium) Lierse)
7	MF	ZIM	Ovidy Karuru (from (France) Boulogne)
9	FW	CMR	Christian Pouga (from (Portugal) Marítimo)
12	FW	GAM	Ibou (from (Belgium) Kortrijk)
15	DF	BEL	Wout Bastiaens (from (Belgium) Westerlo)
18	DF	BEL	Jonas De Roeck (from (Germany) FC Augsburg)
20	MF	BEL	Evariste Ngolok (from (Belgium) Westerlo)
24	DF	BEL	Ludovic Buysens (from (Belgium) Sint-Truiden)
25	FW	BEL	Christopher Verbist (from (Belgium) Standard Liège)
26	GK	BEL	Logan Bailly (from (Germany) Borussia Mönchengladbach)
32	DF	BEL	Günther Vanaudenaerde (from (Belgium) Westerlo)

Out:

No.	Pos.	Nation	Player
3	DF	BEL	Nicky Hayen (on loan to (Belgium) Antwerp)
7	MF	BEL	Jordan Remacle (to (Belgium) Gent)
8	MF	BEL	Maxime Annys (to (Belgium) Sint-Truiden)
9	FW	GHA	Ibrahim Salou (to (Belgium) La Louvière Centre)
10	MF	BEL	Kevin Roelandts (on loan to (Belgium) Antwerp)
11	MF	UKR	Sacha Iakovenko (loan return to (Belgium) Anderlecht)
15	DF	BEL	Pieter Nys (to (Netherlands) Sparta)
16	DF	BEL	Jorn Vermeulen (on loan to (Belgium) Antwerp)
21	GK	BEL	Thomas Kaminski (to (Belgium) Anderlecht)
24	DF	CZE	Radek Dejmek (loan return to (Czech Republic) Slovan Liberec)
25	MF	SEN	Christophe Diandy (loan return to (Belgium) Anderlecht)
26	DF	BEL	Lionel Gendarme (to (Belgium) Oostende)
28	MF	BEL	Antoine Palate (on loan to (Belgium) Diegem Sport)
—	MF	BEL	Nicolas De Mol (was on loan to (Belgium) Wijgmaal, now released to (Belgium) Tienen)
—	GK	BEL	Fred Desomberg (was on loan to (Belgium) Wijgmaal, now released to (Belgium) Tienen)
—	FW	BEL	Tail Schoonjans (to (Belgium) Sint-Niklaas)
—	DF	BEL	Raf Verhamme (was on loan to (Belgium) Wijgmaal, now released to (Belgium) Tienen)
—	FW	BEL	Simon Vermeiren (was on loan to (Belgium) Wijgmaal, now released to (Belgium) Heist)

=== Standard Liège ===
In:

No.	Pos.	Nation	Player
1	GK	JPN	Eiji Kawashima (from (Belgium) Lierse)
3	DF	POR	Yohan Tavares (from (Portugal) Beira-Mar)
8	MF	SWE	Astrit Ajdarević (from (Sweden) Norrköping)
9	FW	ISR	Dudu Biton (from (Belgium) Charleroi)
11	MF	GAB	Frédéric Bulot (from (France) Caen)
31	FW	BEL	Marvin Ogunjimi (on loan from (Spain) Mallorca)
—	DF	ENG	Zeki Fryers (from (England) Manchester United)
—	FW	BRA	Luiz Silva (on loan from (Brazil) Desportivo Brasil)
—	MF	URU	Guillermo Mendez (from (Uruguay) Nacional)

Out:

No.	Pos.	Nation	Player
3	DF	FRA	Karim Belhocine (to (Belgium) Waasland-Beveren)
5	DF	BRA	Felipe (to (Germany) Hannover 96)
7	MF	ISL	Birkir Bjarnason (on loan to (Italy) Pescara)
10	FW	BEL	Mohammed Tchité (to (Belgium) Club Brugge)
11	FW	CIV	Cyriac (to (Belgium) Anderlecht)
28	MF	NED	Danny Verbeek (signed from (Netherlands) Den Bosch, then loaned to (Netherlands) NAC)
77	MF	TOG	Serge Gakpé (loan return to (France) Nantes)
89	MF	BEL	Geoffrey Mujangi Bia (on loan to (England) Watford)
—	MF	BEL	Arnor Angeli (was on loan to (Belgium) Beerschot, now sold to (Belgium) Mons)
—	DF	BEL	Axel Bonemme (on loan to (Belgium) Sint-Truiden)
—	DF	MAR	Abdelfettah Boukhriss (to (Morocco) Raja Casablanca)
—	FW	PER	Iván Bulos (loaned to (Belgium) Sint-Truiden, immediately after being signed from (Peru) Sporting Cristal)
—	MF	BEL	Koen Daerden (was on loan to (Belgium) Sint-Truiden, now released)
—	MF	BEL	Guy Dufour (was on loan to (Belgium) Antwerp, now sold to (Belgium) Sint-Truiden)
—	FW	ROU	Gheorghe Grozav (was on loan to (Romania) Universitatea Cluj, now sold)
—	DF	BEL	Leroy Labylle (was on loan to (Netherlands) MVV, now sold)
—	FW	BEL	Dolly Menga (was on loan to (Belgium) Sint-Truiden, now sold to (Belgium) Lierse)
—	DF	BEL	Pierre-Yves Ngawa (loan deal to (Belgium) Sint-Truiden extended)
—	DF	BEL	Christopher Verbist (was on loan to (Belgium) Charleroi, now sold to (Belgium) OH Leuven)
—	MF	BEL	Lucas Walbrecq (to (Belgium) Genk)
—	MF	BEL	Simon Wantiez (to (Belgium) Roeselare)
—	FW	ISR	Yadin Zaris (loaned to (Hungary) Újpest, immediately after being signed from (Israel) Maccabi Herzliya)
—	MF	BEL	Franco Zennaro (on loan to (Belgium) Waasland-Beveren)

=== Waasland-Beveren ===
In:

No.	Pos.	Nation	Player
6	DF	FRA	Karim Belhocine (from (Belgium) Standard Liège)
8	MF	BEL	Rachid Farssi (from (Belgium) Westerlo)
12	DF	ISR	Gal Shish (from (Israel) Hapoel Tel Aviv)
13	MF	NED	Bas Sibum (from (Germany) Alemannia Aachen)
15	MF	ISR	Steven Cohen (from (Israel) Beitar Jerusalem)
16	MF	COL	Daniel Cruz (from (United States) Dallas)
17	FW	SEN	Alain Mendy (from (Belgium) Brussels)
19	DF	FRA	Cédric D'Ulivo (from (France) Marseille)
20	MF	BEL	Franco Zennaro (on loan from (Belgium) Standard Liège)
21	MF	BDI	Dugary Ndabashinze (from (Belgium) Genk)
22	DF	BEL	Siebe Blondelle (from (Belgium) Mons)
23	MF	BEL	Benoît Ladrière (from (Belgium) Tubize)
24	DF	NED	Roel van Hemert (from (Denmark) Hjørring)
25	FW	SLO	Vito Plut (from (Slovenia) Gorica)
26	GK	BEL	Colin Coosemans (on loan from (Belgium) Club Brugge)
30	MF	BEL	Christophe Lepoint (on loan from (Belgium) Gent)
—	FW	ISR	Barak Badash (on loan from (Israel) Hapoel Kiryat Shmona)
—	MF	ISR	Mohammad Ghadir (on loan from (Israel) Maccabi Haifa)

Out:

No.	Pos.	Nation	Player
4	DF	BEL	Gertjan Martens (signed from (Belgium) Oostende, but then loaned out to Oostende)
—	FW	COD	Jean-Paul Kielo-Lezi (to (Belgium) Deinze)
—	DF	BEL	Jan Masureel (to (Belgium) Deinze)
—	FW	CMR	Hervé Onana (loan return to (Belgium) Sint-Truiden)
—	FW	BEL	Kristof Snelders (to (Belgium) Cappellen)
—	MF	BEL	Joachim Van Damme (to (Belgium) Mechelen)
—	DF	BEL	Spencer Verbiest (to (Belgium) Cappellen)

=== Zulte Waregem ===
In:

No.	Pos.	Nation	Player
4	DF	BEL	Pietro Perdichizzi (on loan from (Belgium) Club Brugge)
11	FW	CRO	Ivan Lendrić (from (Croatia) Hajduk Split)
17	MF	BEL	David Vandenbroeck (loan return from (Belgium) Kortrijk)
22	GK	BEL	Sébastien Bruzzese (from (Belgium) Gent)
27	DF	BEL	Jimmy De Jonghe (on loan from (Belgium) Club Brugge)
28	DF	BEL	Junior Malanda (from (France) Lille)
—	DF	BEL	Bruno Godeau (on loan from (Belgium) Anderlecht)
—	MF	BEL	Thorgan Hazard (on loan from (England) Chelsea)
—	DF	BEL	Bryan Verboom (on loan from (Belgium) Anderlecht)

Out:

No.	Pos.	Nation	Player
2	DF	BEL	Stijn Minne (to (Belgium) Westerlo)
8	DF	DEN	Brian Hamalainen (to (Belgium) Genk)
9	FW	FRA	Teddy Chevalier (to (Netherlands) RKC)
12	MF	BEL	Thomas Matton (to (Belgium) Kortrijk)
17	MF	BLR	Mikhail Sivakov (on loan to (Belarus) BATE Borisov)
19	FW	BEL	Giuseppe Rossini (was on loan to (Belgium) Sint-Truiden, now sold to (Belgium) Charleroi)
20	FW	SEN	Frédéric Gounongbe (from (Belgium) Woluwe-Zaventem, then loaned to (Belgium) Brussels)
—	FW	NED	Jeremy Bokila (was on loan to (Netherlands) Sparta, now loaned to (Romania) Petrolul Ploiești)
—	MF	BEL	René Sterckx (loan return to (Belgium) Anderlecht)
