= 2012–13 RSC Anderlecht season =

R.S.C. Anderlecht
2012–13 season
- Chairman: Roger Vanden Stock
- Manager: John van den Brom
- Stadium: Constant Vanden Stock Stadium
- Belgian Pro League: 1st
- Belgian Super Cup: Winners
- Belgian Cup: Semi-final
- UEFA Champions League: Group stage
- Top goalscorer: League: Dieumerci Mbokani (19); All: Dieumerci Mbokani (27)
- Highest home attendance: 26,361 (3 matches)
- Lowest home attendance: 5,000 vs Mechelen, Belgian Cup, 27 November 2012
- Average home league attendance: 15,816
Home colours	Away colours

The 2012–13 season is a season in Belgian Pro League played by R.S.C. Anderlecht, a Belgian football club based in Anderlecht, Brussels. The season covers the period from 1 July 2012 to 30 June 2013.

== Match results ==
League positions are sourced from Statto, while the remaining contents of each table are sourced from the references in the "Ref" column.

=== Regular season ===
==== League table ====
Pos	Team	Pld	W	D	L	GF	GA	GD	Pts	Qualification
1	Anderlecht	30	20	7	3	69	27	+42	67	Qualification for the Championship play-offs
2	Zulte Waregem	30	19	6	5	49	29	+20	63	Qualification for the Championship play-offs
3	Genk	30	15	10	5	63	40	+23	55	Qualification for the Championship play-offs
4	Club Brugge	30	15	9	6	66	43	+23	54	Qualification for the Championship play-offs
5	Lokeren	30	14	9	7	53	38	+15	51	Qualification for the Championship play-offs

Source: Belgian Pro League
Rules for classification: 1) points; 2) number of matches won; if teams are still tied a playoff is organised.

=== Belgian Pro League ===
Date	League position	Opponents	Venue	Result	Score F–A	Scorers	Attendance	Ref
28 July 2012	5th	Kortrijk	A	D	1–1	Deschacht 81'	8,223	
4 August 2012	6th	Beerschot	H	W	1–0	Kanu 22'	20,000	
12 August 2012	1st	Cercle Brugge	A	W	3–0	Mbokani (3) 5', 24', 75'	9,128	
18 August 2012	2nd	Mons	H	W	2–1	Jovanović 43', Iakovenko 69'	22,000	
25 August 2012	1st	OH Leuven	A	D	1–1	Iakovenko 10'	8,931	
2 September 2012	2nd	Genk	H	D	2–2	Jovanović 42', Bruno 51'	22,000	
15 September 2012	3rd	Lierse	A	D	1–1	Kanu 12'	7,500	
22 September 2012	2nd	Zulte-Waregem	A	W	3–2	Mbokani 30', Iakovenko 57', De Sutter 86'	7,000	
29 September 2012	2nd	Lokeren	H	W	3–0	Mbokani (2) 52', 88', Deschacht 59'	21,000	
7 October 2012	3rd	Standard Liège	A	L	1–2	Jovanović 9'	24,000	
19 October 2012	2nd	Waasland-Beveren	H	W	2–0	Biglia 36', Jovanović 69'	21,000	
27 October 2012	3rd	Sporting Charleroi	A	L	0–2		10,648	
30 October 2012	1st	Gent	H	W	5–0	De Sutter (2) 19', 68', Praet 23', Bruno 74', Iakovenko 82'	21,000	
3 November 2012	1st	Mechelen	A	W	4–1	Kouyaté 36', De Sutter (3) 44', 52', 90+2'	11,400	
11 November 2012	1st	Club Brugge	H	W	6–1	Bruno 22', Mbokani 33', Jovanović 41' pen., Kljestan 54', Biglia 86' pen., Praet 90+2'	21,000	
18 November 2012	1st	Kortrijk	H	W	1–0	Mbokani 90'	21,000	
24 November 2012	1st	Beerschot	A	W	4–1	Bruno 34', Mbokani 42', Gillet 58' pen., Iakovenko 79'	10,048	
1 December 2012	1st	Cercle Brugge	H	W	2–1	Biglia 71' pen., Vargas 89'	21,000	
8 December 2012	1st	Mons	A	W	5–0	Mbokani (3) 5', 40', 87', Kanu 73', Gillet 81' pen.	7,100	
16 December 2012	1st	OH Leuven	H	W	2–1	Mbokani (2) 26' pen., 50'	21,000	
23 December 2012	1st	Genk	A	W	4–2	Gillet 35', De Sutter (2) 44', 86', Iakovenko 90+3'	20,000	
27 December 2012	1st	Lierse	H	W	4–1	Mbokani 30', Jovanović 38', De Sutter 51', Vargas 90+2'	21,000	
26 January 2013	1st	Lokeren	A	W	2–0	De Sutter 49', Iakovenko 90+2'	7,877	
3 February 2013	1st	Standard Liège	H	D	2–2	Biglia 2', Gillet 85'	21,000	
10 February 2013	1st	Waasland-Beveren	A	W	2–1	Mbokani 57', Kanu 81'	5,000	
15 February 2013	1st	Sporting Charleroi	H	W	2–0	Mbokani 13', Bruno 40'	20,000	
24 February 2013	1st	Club Brugge	A	D	2–2	Bruno 78', Armenteros 86'	29,000	
27 February 2013	1st	Zulte-Waregem	H	L	0–1		20,000	
9 March 2013	1st	Mechelen	H	W	1–0	De Sutter 58'	22,500	
16 March 2013	1st	Gent	A	D	1–1	Jovanović 40'	12,012	

=== Championship playoff ===
==== Playoff table ====
Pos	Team	Pld	W	D	L	GF	GA	GD	Pts	Qualification
1	Anderlecht (C)	10	4	3	3	16	11	+5	49	Qualification for the Champions League group stage
2	Zulte Waregem	10	4	3	3	20	20	0	47	Qualification for the Champions League third qualifying round
3	Club Brugge	10	6	1	3	21	17	+4	46	Qualification for the Europa League third qualifying round
4	Standard Liège	10	5	2	3	22	20	+2	42	Qualification for the Testmatches
5	Genk	10	3	3	4	11	13	−2	40	Qualification for the Europa League play-off round
6	Lokeren	10	1	2	7	15	24	−9	31	

Source: soccerway.com
Rules for classification: 1) points; 2) points after deduction of (possible) half points added due to rounding; 3) number of wins; 4) goal difference; 5) number of goals scored; 6) number of away goals scored; 7) number of away wins.
(C) Champions

Date	League position	Opponents	Venue	Result	Score F–A	Scorers	Attendance	Ref
1 April 2013	1st	Genk	H	L	1–2	Nuytinck 37'	26,361	
6 April 2013	1st	Standard Liège	A	D	0–0		21,233	
14 April 2013	1st	Club Brugge	H	D	1–1	Mbokani 60'	24,000	
17 April 2013	1st	Lokeren	H	W	3–0	Jovanović 4', De Sutter 30', Kljestan 37'	20,000	
21 April 2013	2nd	Zulte-Waregem	A	L	1–2	Mbokani 90'	9,482	
28 April 2013	2nd	Club Brugge	A	L	1–2	Bruno 65'	28,000	
5 May 2013	1st	Standard Liège	H	W	2–0	Gillet (2) 55', 66' pen.	26,361	
12 May 2013	1st	Genk	A	W	2–1	Suárez 23', de Zeeuw 83'	23,960	
16 May 2013	1st	Lokeren	A	W	4–2	Kljestan 25', Suárez (2) 45+1', 48', de Zeeuw 76'	7,995	
19 May 2013	1st	Zulte-Waregem	H	D	1–1	Biglia 59'	26,361	

=== Belgian Super Cup ===
Round	Date	Opponents	Venue	Result	Score F–A	Scorers	Attendance	Ref
Final	22 July 2012	Lokeren	H	W	3–2	Praet 24', Mbokani 46', Gillet 76'	14,485	

=== Belgian Cup ===
Round	Date	Opponents	Venue	Result	Score F–A	Scorers	Attendance	Ref
Sixth round	26 September 2012	Boussu Dour Borinage	H	W	2–0	Bruno 63', Praet 87'	7,930	
Seventh round	27 November 2012	Mechelen	H	W	2–0 (a.e.t.)	Praet 110', Mbokani 119'	5,000	
Quarter final first leg	11 December 2012	Gent	A	D	1–1	Jovanović 10'	4,995	
Quarter final second leg	16 January 2013	Gent	H	W	1–0	De Sutter 17'	15,000	
Semi final first leg	30 January 2013	Genk	H	W	1–0	Jovanović 29'	15,000	
Semi final second leg	2 March 2013	Genk	A	L	0–1 (a.e.t.) (6–7 p)		13,912	

=== UEFA Champions League ===
Group C
Pos	Team	Pld	W	D	L	GF	GA	GD	Pts	Qualification	MLG	MIL	ZEN	AND
1	(Spain) Málaga	6	3	3	0	12	5	+7	12	Advance to knockout phase	—	1–0	3–0	2–2
2	(Italy) Milan	6	2	2	2	7	6	+1	8	Advance to knockout phase	1–1	—	0–1	0–0
3	(Russia) Zenit Saint Petersburg	6	2	1	3	6	9	−3	7	Transfer to Europa League	2–2	2–3	—	1–0
4	(Belgium) Anderlecht	6	1	2	3	4	9	−5	5		0–3	1–3	1–0	—

Source: Soccerway

Round	Date	Opponents	Venue	Result	Score F–A	Scorers	Attendance	Ref
Third qualifying round first leg	1 August 2012	Ekranas	H	W	5–0	De Sutter 2', Kanu 21', Mbokani (2) 41', 52', Jovanović 87'	12,203	
Third qualifying round second leg	8 August 2012	Ekranas	A	W	6–0	Kljestan 9', Praet 31', Iakovenko 45+3', De Sutter 47', Molins 62', Canesin 87'	600	
Play-off round first leg	22 August 2012	AEL	A	L	1–2	Mbokani 62'	10,456	
Play-off round second leg	28 August 2012	AEL	H	W	2–0	Mbokani 81', Iakovenko 89'	18,174	
Group	18 September 2012	Milan	A	D	0–0		27,593	
Group	3 October 2012	Málaga	H	L	0–3		15,711	
Group	24 October 2012	Zenit	A	L	0–1		19,500	
Group	6 November 2012	Zenit	H	W	1–0	Mbokani 17'	16,437	
Group	21 November 2012	Milan	H	L	1–3	De Sutter 78'	19,803	
Group	4 December 2012	Málaga	A	D	2–2	Jovanović 50', Mbokani 89'	21,769	

== Player details ==
As of match played 16 May 2013.

Numbers in parentheses denote appearances as substitute.
Players with names struck through and marked † left the club during the playing season.
Players with names in italics and marked * were on loan from another club with Anderlecht.
Key to positions: GK – Goalkeeper; DF – Defender; MF – Midfielder; FW – Forward

No.	Pos.	Nat.	Name	League		Super Cup		Cup		UEFA CL		Total		Discipline	
No.	Pos.	Nat.	Name	Apps	Goals	Apps	Goals	Apps	Goals	Apps	Goals	Apps	Goals	A yellow rectangle, denoting the yellow penalty card shown to a player being cautioned	A red rectangle, denoting the red penalty card shown to a player being sent off
1	GK	BEL	Silvio Proto	39	0	1	0	4	0	10	0	54	0	5	0
3	DF	BEL	Olivier Deschacht	25 (2)	1	1	0	3	0	8	0	37 (2)	2	6	2
4	DF	KSA	~~Osama Hawsawi~~ †	1	0	0	0	1	0	0	0	2	0	0	0
4	DF	BEL	Michaël Heylen	0	0	0	0	0	0	0	0	0	0	0	0
5	MF	ARG	Lucas Biglia	36	5	1	0	4	0	10	0	51	5	6	1
6	MF	COD	~~Mbenza Bedi~~ †	0 (1)	0	0	0	0	0	1	0	1 (1)	0	0	0
6	MF	NED	Demy de Zeeuw *	3 (9)	2	0	0	2	0	0	0	5 (9)	2	3	0
7	MF	SWE	~~Guillermo Molins~~ †	1 (2)	0	0	0	1 (1)	0	0 (2)	1	2 (5)	1	0	0
7	FW	SWE	Samuel Armenteros	0 (3)	1	0	0	0 (1)	0	0	0	0 (4)	1	0	0
8	DF	BEL	Denis Odoi	10 (4)	0	1	0	2	0	4	0	16 (4)	0	3	1
9	FW	ARG	Matías Suárez	8 (3)	3	0	0	0	0	0	0	8 (3)	2	0	0
10	FW	BRA	~~Kanu~~ †	14 (7)	4	1	0	2 (1)	0	6 (1)	1	25 (9)	5	3	0
11	MF	SRB	Milan Jovanović	31 (2)	9	1	0	4 (1)	2	7	2	43 (3)	13	8	2
12	MF	HON	Andy Najar	0	0	0	0	0	0	0	0	0	0	0	0
13	GK	BEL	Thomas Kaminski	1	0	0	0	2	0	0	0	3	0	0	0
14	MF	MAR	~~Abdelhakim Bouhna~~ †	0	0	0	0	0	0	0	0	0	0	0	0
14	DF	NED	Bram Nuytinck	33	1	0	0	5 (1)	0	5	0	42 (2)	1	4	2
15	FW	CIV	Gohi Bi Cyriac	0 (2)	0	0	0	0	0	0	0	0 (2)	0	1	0
16	MF	SEN	Cheikhou Kouyaté	33	1	0	0	4	0	8	0	45	1	7	1
17	FW	UKR	Oleksandr Iakovenko	7 (18)	7	0 (1)	0	2 (2)	0	1 (8)	2	10 (29)	9	1	0
18	MF	CZE	~~Lukáš Mareček~~ †	0	0	0	0	0	0	0 (1)	0	0 (1)	0	0	0
18	FW	GHA	Frank Acheampong *	0	0	0	0	0	0	0	0	0	0	0	0
19	MF	USA	Sacha Kljestan	32 (4)	3	0 (1)	0	4	0	7 (2)	1	43 (7)	4	8	0
20	DF	SWE	Behrang Safari	18 (2)	0	1	0	3	0	5	0	27 (2)	0	7	0
21	FW	BEL	Tom De Sutter	21 (10)	12	0	0	4 (1)	1	4 (2)	3	29 (13)	16	3	0
23	DF	HUN	~~Roland Juhász~~ †	1 (2)	0	0	0	1	0	0 (2)	0	2 (4)	0	0	0
23	MF	BEL	Leander Dendoncker	0	0	0	0	0	0	0	0	0	0	0	0
24	MF	BEL	René Sterckx	0	0	0	0	0	0	0	0	0	0	0	0
25	FW	COD	Dieumerci Mbokani	27	19	1	1	1 (1)	1	8	6	37 (1)	27	10	1
26	MF	BEL	Dennis Praet	22 (5)	2	1	1	6	2	5 (1)	1	33 (7)	6	1	0
27	DF	POL	Marcin Wasilewski	13 (9)	0	1	0	3 (1)	0	6	0	23 (10)	0	8	0
28	MF	BEL	Mehdi Tarfi	0	0	0	0	0	0	0	0	0	0	0	0
29	MF	BEL	Mohammed Aoulad	0	0	0	0	0	0	0	0	0	0	0	0
30	MF	BEL	Guillaume Gillet	32	6	1	1	3	0	10	0	46	7	8	0
31	DF	BEL	Bruno Godeau	0	0	0	0	0	0	0	0	0	0	0	0
32	MF	SEN	Christophe Diandy	0	0	0	0	0	0	0	0	0	0	0	0
33	GK	BEL	Davy Roef	0	0	0	0	0	0	0	0	0	0	0	0
34	DF	BEL	Jonathan Vervoort	0	0	0	0	0	0	0	0	0	0	0	0
37	FW	BEL	Jordan Lukaku	0	0	0	0	0	0	0	0	0	0	0	0
39	FW	BEL	Ziguy Badibanga	0	0	0	0	0	0	0	0	0	0	0	0
39	DF	BEL	Anthony Vanden Borre	0 (1)	0	0	0	0	0	0	0	0 (1)	0	0	0
44	DF	BEL	Bryan Verboom	0	0	0	0	0	0	0	0	0	0	0	0
45	MF	BEL	Massimo Bruno	26 (7)	7	0	0	3 (2)	1	5 (1)	0	34 (10)	8	1	0
55	MF	BRA	Fernando Canesin	1 (3)	0	0	0	1 (1)	0	0 (3)	1	2 (7)	1	0	0
70	MF	VEN	Ronald Vargas	4 (6)	2	0	0	1	0	0 (1)	0	5 (7)	2	0	0
77	MF	BRA	~~Reynaldo~~ †	2	0	0 (1)	0	0	0	0	0	2 (1)	0	0	0
78	MF	SRB	Dalibor Veselinović	0	0	0	0	0	0	0	0	0	0	0	0
