= Dalibor (name) =

Name list

- Gender: male

Origin
- Origin: Slavic
- Meaning: dali ("far away") + bor ("fight")

Other names
- Related names: Sambor

Dalibor (Cyrillic script: Далибор) is primarily a male given name of Slavic origin, mostly in the Czech Republic. The name is popular in some West Slavic and South Slavic countries, such as Slovakia, Serbia, Croatia, and Bosnia and Herzegovina. Its literal meaning is "fighting far away", and it is derived from the elements daleko ("far away") and boriti ("to fight"). The first part can also be derived from oddalovat ("to delay"), hence it can be also interpreted as "someone who delays/avoids fighting".

There is an eponymous opera by Bedřich Smetana, based on Slavonic mythology.

== People with this given name ==
- Dalibor Andonov (born 1973), a Serbian musician
- Dalibor Bagarić (born 1980), a Croatian basketball player
- Dalibor Brazda (1921–2005), a Czech-Swiss composer and conductor
- Dalibor Brozović (1927–2009), a Croatian linguist
- Dalibor Dragić (born 1972), a Bosnian Serb footballer
- Dalibor Gatarić (born 1986), a Bosnian-Herzegovinian footballer
- Dalibor Janda (born 1953), a Czech pop singer
- Dalibor Jedlička (1929–2018), a Czech opera singer
- Dalibor Karvay (born 1985), a Slovak violinist and pedagogue
- Dalibor Medic (born 1979), an Austrian national trainer of Taekwon-Do
- Dalibor Milenković (born 1987), a Serbian football goalkeeper
- Dalibor Pauletić (born 1978), a Croatian football defender
- Dalibor Pešterac (born 1976), a Serbian footballer
- Dalibor Šamšal (born 1985), a Croatian alpine ski racer
- Dalibor Stevanovič (born 1984), a Slovenian footballer
- Dalibor Stojanović (born 1989), a Slovenian footballer
- Dalibor Svrčina (born 2002), a Czech tennis player
- Dalibor Cyril Vačkář (1906–1984), a Czech composer
- Dalibor Veselinović (born 1987), a Serbian footballer
- Dalibor Vesely (1934–2015), a Czech architect
- Dalibor Višković (born 1977), a Croatian footballer
- Dalibor z Kozojed (died 1498), a 15th-century Czech knight, on whom Smetana based his 1868 opera Dalibor

== People with this surname ==
- Jan and Vlasta Dalibor, Czech immigrants to the UK, puppeteers who made the original Pinky and Perky

== See also ==
- Slavic names
