= Dalibor =

Dalibor may refer to:

- Dalibor (name), Slavic surname and masculine given name
- Dalibor (film), a 1956 Czech film
- Dalibor (opera), 1868 opera by Bedřich Smetana, based on the life of Dalibor z Kozojed, the 15th century Czech knight
