= Pešterac =

Pešterac (Serbian Cyrillic: Пештерац) is a Serbian surname, a demonym derived from Pešter. It may refer to:

- Dalibor Pešterac (born 1976), former Serbian footballer
- Miladin Pešterac (1960–2007), former Serbian footballer
