= Rémi Pillot =

French footballer (born 1990)

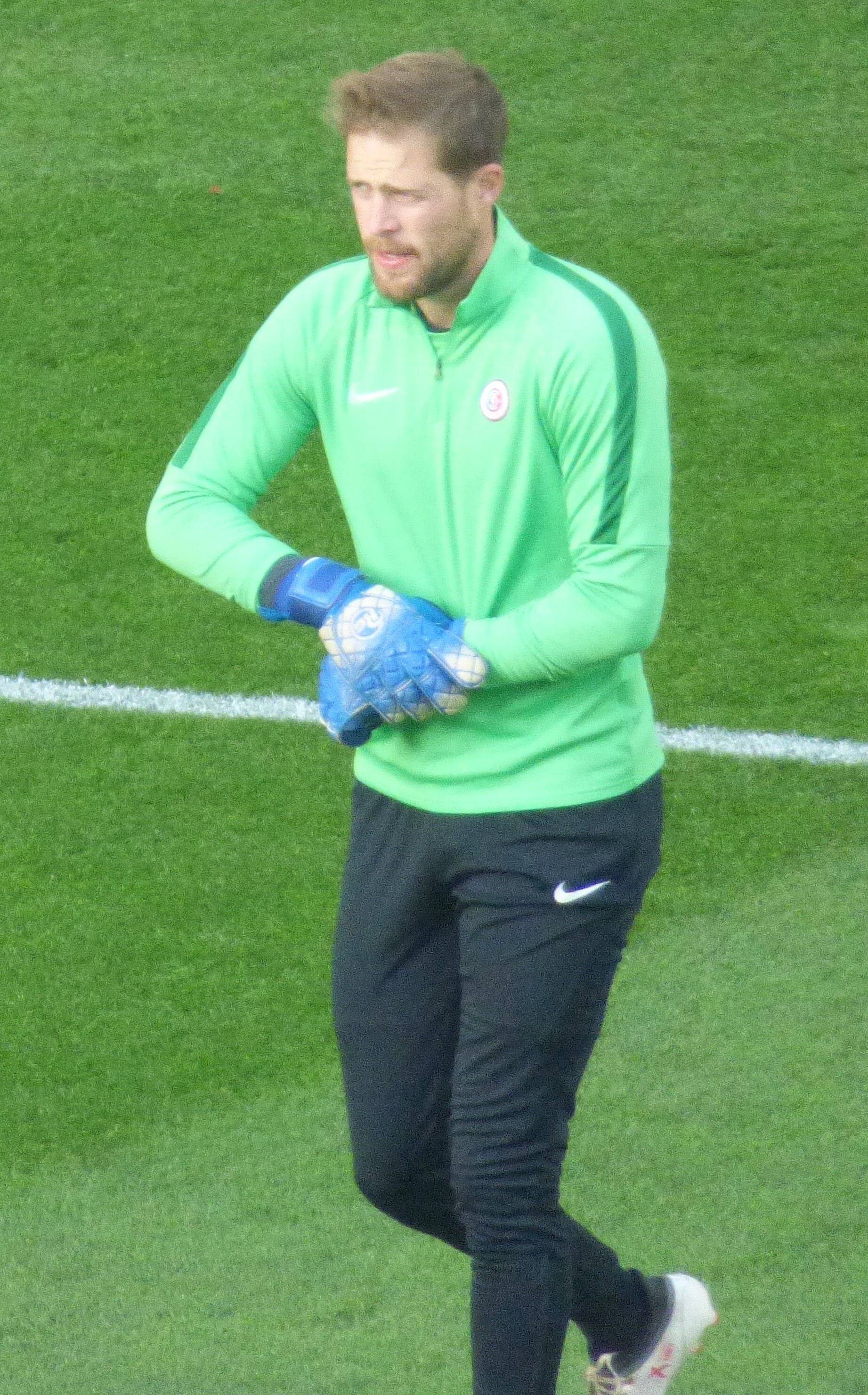
- Pillot with Châteauroux in 2018

Personal information
- Date of birth: 27 July 1990 (age 36)
- Place of birth: Besançon, France
- Height: 1.87 m (6 ft 2 in)
- Position: Goalkeeper

Team information
- Current team: Racing Besançon

Youth career
- –2009: Nancy

Senior career*
| Years | Team | Apps | (Gls) |
| 2008–2012 | Nancy B | 74 | (0) |
| 2012–2016 | Kortrijk | 1 | (0) |
| 2016–2021 | Châteauroux | 70 | (0) |
| 2017–2021 | Châteauroux B | 3 | (0) |
| 2021–2024 | Les Herbiers | 72 | (0) |
| 2024– | Racing Besançon | 10 | (0) |

International career^{‡}
| 2008–2009 | France U19 | 7 | (0) |
| 2009–2010 | France U20 | 2 | (0) |
- * Club domestic league appearances and goals as of 7 December 2024 ‡ National team caps and goals as of 18 June 2013

Rémi Pillot (born 27 July 1990) is a French professional footballer who plays as a goalkeeper for Championnat National 3 club Racing Besançon.

== Career ==
Pillot was born in Besançon. In August 2012, he signed for Belgian side Kortrijk where he took up the role as second goalkeeper behind South African player Darren Keet. He played all Belgian Cup games helping Kortrijk reach the semi-finals keeping three clean sheets in five matches. Pillot made his league debut in May 2013 against Lierse.
