= Aliou Dia =

French footballer (born 1990)

Personal information
- Date of birth: 30 May 1990 (age 36)
- Place of birth: Roubaix, France
- Height: 1.80 m (5 ft 11 in)
- Position: Defender

Youth career
- 2002–2004: SCO Roubaix 59
- 2004–2008: Mouscron

Senior career*
Years	Team	Apps	(Gls)
2008–2010	Mouscron	1	(0)
2010–2012	Mons	48	(0)
2012	Brussels	1	(0)
- * Club domestic league appearances and goals as of 13 October 2012

Aliou Dia (born 30 May 1990) is a French footballer who last played for Brussels. Before, Dia has played 17 matches for Mons of the Belgian Pro League, the top league of football in Belgium.
