= Jean-Paul Kielo-Lezi =

Congolese footballer

Personal information
- Full name: Jean-Paul Kielo-Lezi
- Date of birth: 4 May 1984 (age 42)
- Place of birth: Kinshasa, Zaire
- Height: 1.75 m (5 ft 9 in)
- Position: Striker

Team information
- Current team: Retraite

Youth career
- Verbroedering Denderhoutem

Senior career*
Years	Team	Apps	(Gls)
- Dender
2006	Lokeren	6	(0)
2006–2008	KV Mechelen	23	(2)
- FC Brussels
- Red Star Waasland

International career
- Congo DR
- * Club domestic league appearances and goals as of 17 July 2009

Jean-Paul Kielo-Lezi (born 4 May 1984 in Kinshasa) is a Congolese footballer who plays as a striker.

== Club career ==
He previously played for FC Denderleeuw, Verbroedering Denderhoutem, K.S.C. Lokeren Oost-Vlaanderen and Y.R. K.V. Mechelen in Belgium.
