= Jordan Garcia-Calvete =

Belgian footballer (born 1992)

Personal information
- Full name: Jordan Garcia-Calvete
- Date of birth: 6 May 1992 (age 34)
- Place of birth: Brussels, Belgium
- Height: 1.70 m (5 ft 7 in)
- Position: Midfielder

Youth career
- Anderlecht

Senior career*
Years	Team	Apps	(Gls)
2011–2013	Anderlecht	0	(0)
2011	→ Sint-Truiden (loan)	5	(0)
2012–2013	→ De Graafschap (loan)	24	(2)
2013–2015	De Graafschap	45	(4)
2015–2016	RWDM Brussels	4	(0)
2016–2020	FC Ganshoren		
- * Club domestic league appearances and goals

Jordan Garcia-Calvete (born 6 May 1992) is a Belgian footballer who plays as a midfielder.

== Career ==
Garcia-Calverte was loaned to De Graafschap on 1 January for the remainder of the 2011–12 Eredivisie season from R.S.C. Anderlecht after having been previously on loan with K. Sint-Truidense V.V. He made his debut in the 2–0 loss to SC Heerenveen on 21 January as a second-half substitute.

He played for FC Ganshoren from 2016, before leaving the club in 2020 after the club reached promotion to the Belgian Division 2.

== Personal life ==
Born in Brussels, Garcia-Calvete is of Spanish descent and holds a Spanish passport.
