= Stefan Deloose =

Belgian footballer

Personal information
- Full name: Stefan Deloose
- Date of birth: 14 January 1990 (age 36)
- Place of birth: Bornem, Belgium
- Height: 1.91 m (6 ft 3 in)
- Position: Goalkeeper

Team information
- Current team: Temse

Senior career*
Years	Team	Apps	(Gls)
2008–2012	Lokeren	2	(0)
2012–2013	Beerschot	0	(0)
2013–2014	Wolvertem		
2014–2017	Bornem		
2017–	Temse		

International career^{‡}
2005–2006	Belgium U16	6	(0)
2006–2007	Belgium U17	8	(0)
2007	Belgium U18	1	(0)
2008–2009	Belgium U19	2	(0)
- * Club domestic league appearances and goals as of 14 June 2018 ‡ National team caps and goals as of 14 June 2018

Stefan Deloose (born 14 January 1990) is a Belgian footballer who plays as a goalkeeper for Bornem in the Belgian Third Division.
