= Siebe Blondelle =

Belgian footballer and coach (born 1986)

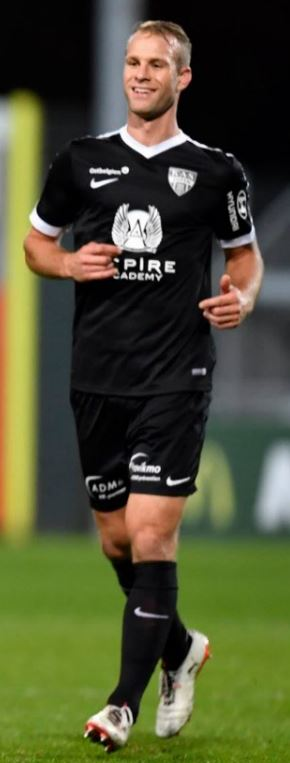

Personal information
- Date of birth: 20 April 1986 (age 40)
- Place of birth: Ath, Belgium
- Height: 1.85 m (6 ft 1 in)
- Positions: Centre-back; defensive midfielder

Youth career
- 1992–1995: Hoger op Oedelem
- 1995–2000: Cercle Brugge
- 2000–2002: Club Brugge
- 2002–2005: Vitesse

Senior career*
Years	Team	Apps	(Gls)
2005–2008	Vitesse	15	(1)
2007–2008	→ VVV-Venlo (loan)	16	(1)
2008–2010	Dender EH	63	(3)
2010	→ Rot Weiss Ahlen (loan)	5	(0)
2010–2012	Mons	53	(1)
2012–2015	Waasland-Beveren	81	(2)
2015–2020	Eupen	115	(5)
2020–2023	Deinze	32	(2)
Total		380	(15)

International career
2003–2004	Belgium U17	12	(2)
2003–2005	Belgium U18	17	(1)
2005–2006	Belgium U19	7	(0)
2007	Belgium U21	4	(0)
- * Club domestic league appearances and goals

Siebe Blondelle (born 20 April 1986) is a Belgian professional football coach and former player who is coach of the Club Brugge' U18 team. A centre-back during his playing days, Blondelle played for clubs in Belgium, the Netherlands and Germany, and was a Belgium youth international.

== Playing career ==
Blondelle is a defender who made his debut in professional football, being part of the Vitesse Arnhem squad in the 2005–06 season. For the 2008–09 season, Blondelle signed a contract with Jupiler League side FCV Dender. In January 2010, he left FCV Dender to sign a loan deal for Rot Weiss Ahlen. After that, he signed a contract with Mons. There he played mostly in the Belgian Second Division, but also gained experience in the Jupiler Pro League. In total, he made 64 appearances, scored one goal and made five assists.

On 1 July 2012, he signed a contract with Belgian First Division A club Waasland-Beveren. There he quickly became a regular starter and played three years for the club in the highest tier. He finished his spell with 66 appearances and five goals.

On 1 July 2015, he was signed by the Belgian club Eupen. There, he was an integral part of the team which promoted back to the Belgian First Division A after one season. He was appointed captain of the team at the end of the 2018–19 season.

After his contract expired at the end of the 2019–20 season, Blondelle moved to Deinze, who had been promoted to Belgian Second Division for the 2020–21 season, and signed a three-year contract there.

== Coaching career ==
After retiring from playing, Blondelle was appointed assistant first-team coach of his last club Deinze. In 2024, he became coach in Club Brugge's academy, starting as coach of the under-18 team.

== International career ==
Blondelle is former youth international and played for the U-17, U-18, U-19 and U-20 from Belgium.
