= Spencer Verbiest =

Belgian footballer

Personal information
- Full name: Spencer Verbiest
- Date of birth: 6 February 1984 (age 42)
- Place of birth: Merksem, Belgium
- Height: 1.84 m (6 ft 0 in)
- Position: Defensive midfielder

Youth career
- Putte
- Germinal Ekeren
- Genk

Senior career*
Years	Team	Apps	(Gls)
2002–2003	Genk	2	(0)
2003–2005	Heerenveen	1	(0)
2005–2010	Royal Antwerp	106	(3)
2010–2012	Waasland	50	(0)
2012–2014	Cappellen	49	(0)
2014–2017	KSC City Pirates		
- * Club domestic league appearances and goals

Spencer Verbiest (born 6 February 1984) is a Belgian retired footballer who played as a defensive midfielder.

== Career ==
Verbiest previously played for K.A.A. Gent, SC Heerenveen and Antwerp.
