= Uroš Palibrk =

Slovenian footballer

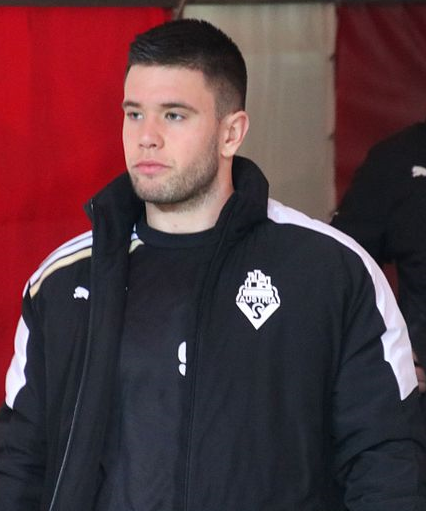

Personal information
- Date of birth: 22 March 1992 (age 34)
- Place of birth: Kranj, Slovenia
- Height: 1.78 m (5 ft 10 in)
- Position: Forward

Team information
- Current team: SAK Klagenfurt
- Number: 99

Youth career
- –2007: Triglav Kranj
- 2008–2011: Milan

Senior career*
| Years | Team | Apps | (Gls) |
| 2008 | Triglav Kranj | 2 | (0) |
| 2011–2013 | Milan | 0 | (0) |
| 2011 | → Viareggio (loan) | 9 | (0) |
| 2012 | → Rijeka (loan) | 9 | (0) |
| 2012–2013 | → Lierse SK (loan) | 0 | (0) |
| 2013–2015 | Triglav Kranj | 22 | (4) |
| 2015–2016 | Austria Salzburg | 35 | (9) |
| 2016 | Sava Kranj | 3 | (1) |
| 2017 | Ivančna Gorica | 11 | (7) |
| 2017–2022 | Omonia Aradippou | 29+ | (17+) |
| 2023– | SAK Klagenfurt | 24 | (4) |

International career
| 2008 | Slovenia U16 | 3 | (1) |
| 2009 | Slovenia U17 | 2 | (0) |
| 2011–2012 | Slovenia U20 | 3 | (0) |
- * Club domestic league appearances and goals as of 29 December 2023

Uroš Palibrk (born 22 March 1992) is a Slovenian footballer who plays as a forward for SAK Klagenfurt in the Austrian Landesliga. Previously he played for Cypriot side Omonia Aradippou.
