= Daan Van Gijseghem =

Belgian footballer

Personal information
- Date of birth: 2 March 1988 (age 38)
- Place of birth: Oudenaarde, Belgium
- Height: 1.84 m (6 ft 0 in)
- Position: Centre-back

Youth career
- Horebeke VV
- Ronse
- AA Gent
- Mouscron

Senior career*
| Years | Team | Apps | (Gls) |
| 2004–2009 | Mouscron | 112 | (1) |
| 2010–2012 | Club Brugge | 36 | (0) |
| 2012–2015 | Mons | 51 | (0) |
| 2015–2016 | Sint-Eloois-Winkel | 9 | (0) |
| 2016–2020 | Oudenaarde | | |

International career
| 2003 | Belgium U15 | 4 | (0) |
| 2003–2004 | Belgium U16 | 17 | (0) |
| 2004–2005 | Belgium U17 | 8 | (0) |
| 2005–2007 | Belgium U19 | 21 | (0) |
| 2007–2010 | Belgium U21 | 15 | (0) |
- * Club domestic league appearances and goals as of 19:07, 1 November 2023 (UTC)

Daan Van Gijseghem (Dutch pronunciation: [ˈdaːn vɑŋ ˈɣɛizəɣɛm]; (Note: In isolation, van is pronounced [vɑn].) born 2 March 1988) is a Belgian football player.

== Career ==
On 8 January 2010, Club Brugge signed the former RE Mouscron defender on a free transfer until June 2013. Following the 2011–12 season however, he moved to Mons.
