= Rachid Bourabia =

French footballer (born 1985)

Personal information
- Full name: Rachid Bourabia
- Date of birth: 22 March 1985 (age 41)
- Place of birth: Dijon, France
- Height: 1.80 m (5 ft 11 in)
- Position: Midfielder

Senior career*
Years	Team	Apps	(Gls)
2003–2005	Dijon	8	(0)
2005–2007	Beauvais Oise	58	(5)
2007–2011	K.V. Red Star Waasland	125	(30)
2011–2012	Mons	23	(6)
2012–2015	Lierse	82	(18)
2015	Waasland-Beveren	6	(0)
2016	Sedan	8	(0)
- * Club domestic league appearances and goals as of 22:28, 30 September 2018 (UTC)

Rachid Bourabia (born 22 March 1985) is a French former footballer who played as a midfielder.

He previously played for Mons and Lierse in Belgium, and Dijon FCO and AS Beauvais Oise in the French Championnat National, making two appearances in Ligue 2.

== Personal life ==
Bourabia holds both French and Moroccan nationalities. His brothers, Mehdi Bourabia and Nordine Bourabia, are also footballers.
