= Jimmy Kamghain =

French footballer (born 1992)

Personal information
- Full name: Jimmy Kamghain
- Date of birth: 3 July 1992 (age 34)
- Place of birth: Avignon, France
- Height: 1.79 m (5 ft 10 1/2 in)
- Position: Right winger

Team information
- Current team: Poissy

Youth career
- 2006–2009: Paris Saint-Germain

Senior career*
Years	Team	Apps	(Gls)
2009–2012	Paris Saint-Germain	0	(0)
2012–2014	Kortrijk	14	(0)
2014	→ Roeselare (loan)		
2015–	Poissy		

International career^{‡}
2007–2008	France U17	7	(3)
2008–2009	France U18	10	(1)
2009–2010	France U19	2	(0)
- * Club domestic league appearances and goals as of 14 February 2014 ‡ National team caps and goals as of 14 October 2012

Jimmy Kamghain (born 3 July 1992, Avignon) is a French footballer, who is currently playing for Poissy.

== Career ==
Jimmy Kamghain began his career with French side P.S.G in 2006 and he signed a professional contract in 2009, but he never made a first team appearance during his time at the Parc des Princes. He currently plays for Kortrijk in the Belgian Pro League (D1), having signed on a free transfer from P.S.G, and Kamghain made his debut for Kortrijk on the opening day of the season, which was a 1-1 draw against Anderlecht, Kamghain played 51 minutes, but he was substituted on the 52nd minute. Kamghain has currently made seven league appearances at the Guldensporen Stadion.
