= Gertjan Martens =

Belgian footballer (born 1988)

Personal information
- Date of birth: 20 September 1988 (age 38)
- Place of birth: Ursel, Belgium
- Height: 1.88 m (6 ft 2 in)
- Position: Centre back

Team information
- Current team: Hoek
- Number: 21

Youth career
- 1993–1994: Sparta Ursel
- 1994–2005: Club Brugge
- 2005–2009: Gent

Senior career*
Years	Team	Apps	(Gls)
2009–2010	Ronse	34	(6)
2010–2012	KV Oostende	59	(6)
2012–2013	Waasland-Beveren	0	(0)
2012–2013	→ KV Oostende (loan)	27	(1)
2013–2015	KV Oostende	8	(0)
2014–2015	→ Royal Antwerp (loan)	28	(0)
2015–2018	Union SG	85	(8)
2018–2019	Tubize	14	(0)
2019–2020	RWD Molenbeek	10	(0)
2020	Eendracht Aalst	4	(0)
2020–2022	Knokke	10	(0)
2022–	Hoek	95	(15)
- * Club domestic league appearances and goals as of 16:19, 21 October 2025 (UTC)

Gertjan Martens (born 20 September 1988) is a Belgian professional footballer who plays as a centre back for Dutch Tweede Divisie club Hoek.

== Club career ==
=== Eendracht Aalst ===
On 1 February 2020 it was confirmed, that Martens had joined S.C. Eendracht Aalst in the Belgian Second Amateur Division.
