= Dalibor Milenković =

Serbian footballer

Personal information
- Full name: Dalibor Milenković
- Date of birth: 9 January 1987 (age 39)
- Place of birth: Kruševac, SFR Yugoslavia
- Height: 1.87 m (6 ft 1 1/2 in)
- Position: Goalkeeper

Youth career
- Red Star Belgrade

Senior career*
Years	Team	Apps	(Gls)
2005–2014	Napredak Kruševac	43	(0)
2006–2007	→ Rudar Alpos (loan)		
2007–2008	→ Radnički Niš (loan)	23	(0)
2009	→ Kolubara (loan)	0	(0)
- * Club domestic league appearances and goals

Dalibor Milenković (Serbian Cyrillic: Далибор Миленковић; born January 9, 1987) is a Serbian retired goalkeeper.
