= Arnor Angeli =

Belgian footballer

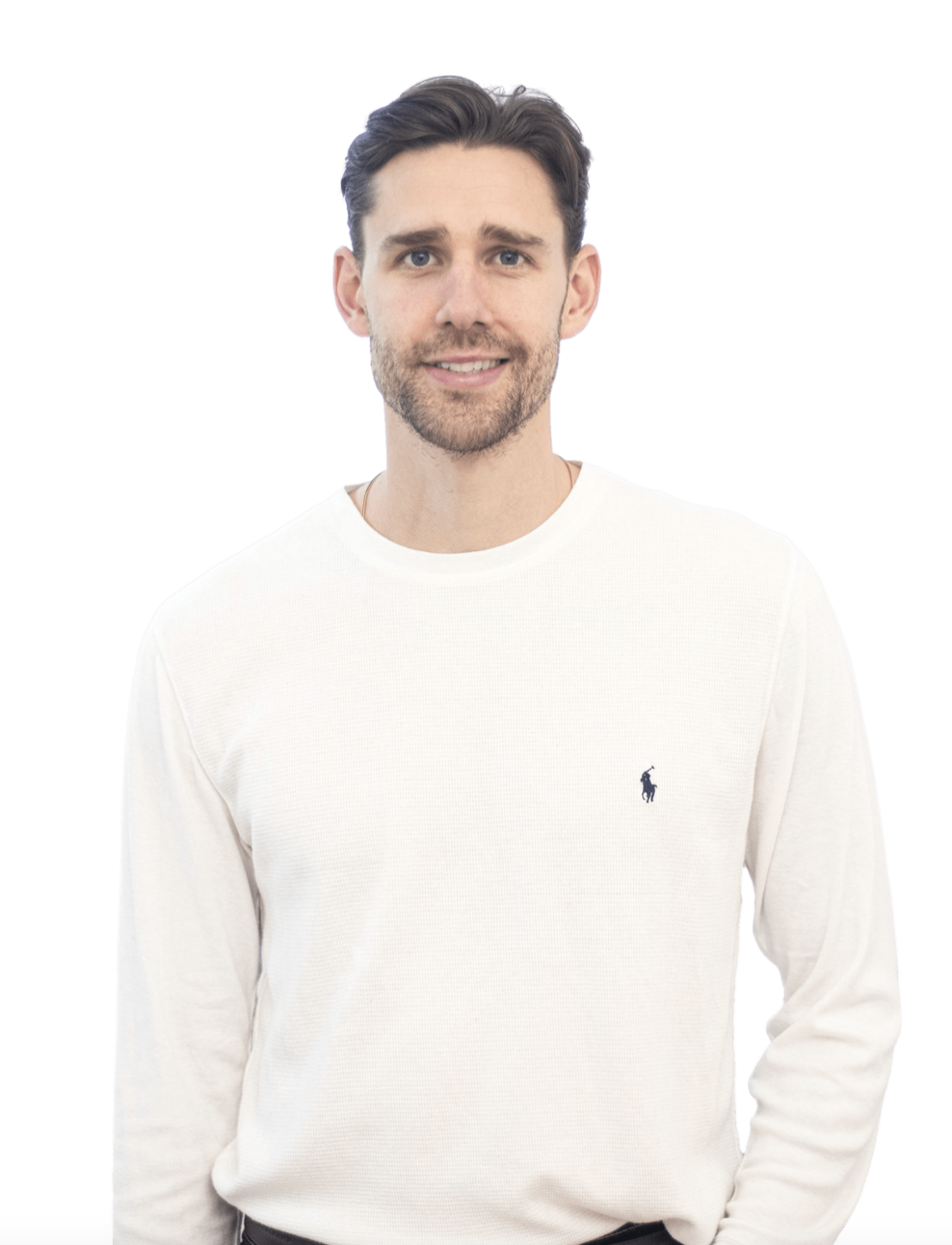

Personal information
- Full name: Arnor Angeli
- Date of birth: 25 February 1991 (age 35)
- Place of birth: Brussels, Belgium
- Height: 1.90 m (6 ft 3 in)
- Position: Midfielder

Team information
- Current team: Renaissance Mons 44
- Number: 7

Youth career
- 1997–2006: Anderlecht
- 2006–2008: Brussels
- 2008–2009: Standard de Liège

Senior career*
Years	Team	Apps	(Gls)
2009–2012	Standard Liège	13	(1)
2011–2012	→ Beerschot (loan)	12	(1)
2012–2014	Mons	42	(5)
2014–2015	Avellino	13	(0)
2016	Dender	14	(0)
2016–2017	FC Lebbeke		
2017–2020	Léopold		
2020–2021	La Louvière Centre	1	(0)
2021–	Renaissance Mons 44		

International career
2007	Belgium U17	2	(0)
2008–2009	Belgium U18	9	(3)
2009	Belgium U19	6	(1)
2010–2011	Belgium U21	7	(0)
- * Club domestic league appearances and goals as of 11:43, 14 February 2021 (UTC)

Arnor Angeli (born 25 February 1991) is a Belgian footballer who plays in midfield for Renaissance Mons 44.

== Early life ==
Angeli is from Brussels, and his father, a supporter of Sporting d'Anderlecht, named him after Arnór Guðjohnsen, the Icelandic attacker for the Anderlecht team in the 1980s.

== Club career ==
Angeli was trained at Anderlecht. He played there from the age of six, for the under-7s until the under-15s. When a coach from Lierse SK signed some other players, Angeli decided, with regret, to leave Anderlecht to play more games. He then played for Brussels, but when they were relegated to D2 and he no longer had the opportunity to play for an elite team, he decided to leave the club. With the option of a number of Belgian, Dutch, and French clubs, he decided to join Standard de Liège due to its proximity to sporting projects. Aged 18, he signed a contract with the club. He played for the U19s at first, quickly rising to the reserves (U21). For the following season (2009–2010), he was named in the first team.

Angeli played his first game in Belgian First Division A in the 95th minute of the Standard-Courtrai match on 26 September 2009. The score was 1–0 and Standard needed an equaliser in the dying seconds. After only 65 seconds of play, with his second touch of the ball, Angeli scored a goal which sealed the victory. He was named as a starter in his first game in the same season, in the game against Mouscron (0–0) on 30 October 2009.

== International career ==
Angeli played for the youth national teams. He took part in the U19 Belgium team which competed in a friendly tournament.

== Honours ==
Standard Liège

- Belgian Super Cup: 2009
