= Kristof Maes =

Belgian footballer

Personal information
- Date of birth: 19 April 1988 (age 38)
- Place of birth: Belgium
- Height: 1.90 m (6 ft 3 in)
- Position: Goalkeeper

Team information
- Current team: Cappellen
- Number: 13

Senior career*
Years	Team	Apps	(Gls)
2005–2012	Germinal Beerschot	8	(0)
2012–2015	Gent	0	(0)
2015–	Cappellen	19	(0)
- * Club domestic league appearances and goals as of 14 December 2015

Kristof Maes (born 19 April 1988) is a Belgian goalkeeper currently playing for Belgian Third Division side Cappellen.

== Career ==
He has represented the Belgium national football team at Under-18 level. He has played for Belgian Pro League side Beerschot AC before moving to K.A.A. Gent during the 2012 summer transfer window.

He started his career at Belgian club KFCO Wilrijk.
