= Jan Masureel =

Belgian footballer

Personal information
- Full name: Jan Simon Masureel
- Date of birth: 6 September 1981 (age 45)
- Place of birth: Bruges, Belgium
- Height: 1.91 m (6 ft 3 in)
- Position: Defender

Team information
- Current team: SK Deinze

Youth career
- Cercle Brugge

Senior career*
| Years | Team | Apps | (Gls) |
| 2001–2007 | Cercle Brugge | 103 | (4) |
| 2006–2007 | → Deinze (loan) | 30 | (8) |
| 2007–2008 | KV Oostende | | |
| 2008–2012 | RS Waasland | | |
| 2012– | Deinze | | |
- * Club domestic league appearances and goals as of 22 June 2007 ‡ National team caps and goals as of 20 June 2007

Jan Masureel (born 6 September 1981 in Bruges) is a Belgian professional football player.

Masureel started his career at Cercle Brugge, where he made his debut for the first team in 2001, in a 2–0 home win against FC Denderleeuw. In 2006, Masureel was loaned for a whole season to SK Deinze in the Belgian Second Division, where he scored 8 goals, despite having played as full-back all the time. On 22 June 2007, it was revealed that Masureel's transfer to KV Oostende had been completed. After one season in Oostende, he moved to K.V. Red Star Waasland, with which he enjoyed promotion to the Belgian Pro League during the 2011–12 season. He moved to Deinze after the promotion.
