= Franco Zennaro =

Belgian footballer

Personal information
- Date of birth: 1 April 1993 (age 33)
- Place of birth: Liège, Belgium
- Height: 1.75 m (5 ft 9 in)
- Position: Defensive midfielder

Team information
- Current team: Sprimont Comblain Sport

Youth career
- R.R.F.C. Montegnée

Senior career*
Years	Team	Apps	(Gls)
2009–2015	Standard Liège	1	(0)
2012	→ Waasland-Beveren (loan)	5	(0)
2013–2014	→ Fortuna Sittard (loan)	31	(0)
2015	NK Istra 1961	0	(0)
2015–2016	KSV Roeselare	2	(0)
2016–	RFCB Sprimont	0	(0)

International career
2008	Belgium U15	6	(0)
2008–2009	Belgium U16	7	(1)
2009–2010	Belgium U17	8	(0)
2010	Belgium U18	2	(0)
2011–2012	Belgium U19	14	(0)
2012	Belgium U20	2	(0)
2012	Belgium U21	1	(1)
- * Club domestic league appearances and goals as of 7 December 2015

Franco Zennaro (Italian pronunciation: [ˈfraŋko ddzenˈnaːro]; born 1 April 1993) is a Belgian footballer who currently plays for Sprimont Comblain Sport.
