= Roel van Hemert =

Dutch footballer

Personal information
- Full name: Roel van Hemert
- Date of birth: 21 November 1984 (age 41)
- Place of birth: Hurwenen, Gelderland, Netherlands
- Height: 1.81 m (5 ft 11 in)
- Position: Defender

Youth career
- Hilvaria
- 2003-2004: Willem II
- 2004: DOSKO

Senior career*
Years	Team	Apps	(Gls)
2004–2006	Turnhout	45	(4)
2006–2007	Dender	16	(2)
2007–2009	Royal Antwerp	63	(1)
2009–2011	Lierse SK	35	(0)
2011–2012	Hjørring	21	(0)
2012–2013	Waasland-Beveren	3	(0)
2013	Visé	9	(0)
2013–2014	Turnhout	17	(1)
2014–2015	KMSK Deinze	22	(0)
2015–2017	Cappellen	33+	(2+)
2017-2019	KFC Lille		
2019-2020	KVS Branst		
2020-2021	ASV Geel		
2021-2024	KV Hooikt		
- * Club domestic league appearances and goals as of 16 July 2020

Roel van Hemert (born 21 November 1984 in Hurwenen, Gelderland) is a Dutch retired footballer

== Career ==
Raised in Hilvarenbeek, van Hemert started playing football at local club Hilvaria. Besides the Netherlands, van Hemert has played in Belgium and Denmark. He returned to Belgium from Danish side Hjørring in 2012 to play for Waasland-Beveren. In 2015 he swapped Deinze for Cappellen, after playing for almost bankrupt club Visé.

In 2020, he joined amateur side ASV Geel alongside compatriot and fellow veteran Sherjill MacDonald with whom he also runs football agency Real Soccer Management. They both left for KV Hooikt a year later.
