= Dalibor Stojanović =

Slovenian footballer

Personal information
- Date of birth: 4 April 1989 (age 37)
- Place of birth: Ljubljana, SFR Yugoslavia
- Height: 1.72 m (5 ft 8 in)
- Positions: Midfielder; striker

Youth career
- 1999–2002: Šmartno
- 2002–2004: Slovan
- 2004–2005: Domžale
- 2005–2007: Benfica

Senior career*
Years	Team	Apps	(Gls)
2007–2010	Domžale	31	(2)
2008–2009	→ unknown (loan)	4	(1)
2010–2012	Gorica	13	(0)
2013	Austria Salzburg	2	(0)
2013	St. Pölten	1	(0)
2013	St. Pölten Ama.	11	(2)
2014	Floridsdorfer AC	12	(2)
2015	Wolfsberger AC	13	(2)
2016	SK Maria Saal	12	(0)
2018	DSG Ferlach	7	(1)

International career
2007	Slovenia U19	1	(0)
- * Club domestic league appearances and goals as of September 2013

Dalibor Stojanović (born 4 April 1989) is a Slovenian retired football midfielder/striker.

== Honors ==
- Slovenian League: 2007–08
