= Abdelhakim Bouhna =

Belgian-born Moroccan footballer

Personal information
- Full name: Abdelhakim Nour Bouhna
- Date of birth: 24 May 1991 (age 35)
- Place of birth: Brussels, Belgium
- Height: 1.79 m (5 ft 10 1/2 in)
- Position: Winger

Youth career
- Diegem Sport

Senior career*
Years	Team	Apps	(Gls)
2010–2012	Diegem Sport	54	(15)
2012–2014	Anderlecht	0	(0)
2012–2013	→ Roeselare (loan)	24	(1)
2015	Latina	3	(0)
2015–2017	Istra 1961	40	(1)
2018–2019	Lokomotiv Plovdiv	41	(2)
- * Club domestic league appearances and goals as of 11 May 2019

Abdelhakim Bouhna (born 24 May 1991) is a Belgian-born Moroccan footballer who plays as a winger.

== Career ==
Bouhna started his career at the third-tier Diegem Sport before he was spotted by Anderlecht scouts during a friendly between the two clubs and arranged a transfer in the summer of 2012. He never broke, however, into the Anderlecht first team, playing on loan at second-tier SV Roeselare and in Anderlecht's reserves.

After a period as a free agent in late 2014, he signed with Serie B side Latina Calcio. Not finding much playing time, he left the club the following summer, signing for NK Istra 1961 in Croatia in September 2015. There, he made his first-team debut in the Prva HNL in the 1–0 away loss against NK Rijeka on 13 September 2015.

On 28 December 2017, Bouhna signed a one-and-a-half-year contract with Bulgarian club Lokomotiv Plovdiv.

== Honours ==
=== Club ===
Lokomotiv Plovdiv

- Bulgarian Cup: 2018–19
