= Dalibor Pešterac =

Serbian footballer

Personal information
- Full name: Dalibor Pešterac
- Date of birth: 14 January 1976 (age 50)
- Place of birth: Belgrade, SFR Yugoslavia
- Height: 1.87 m (6 ft 1 1/2 in)
- Position: Defender

Senior career*
Years	Team	Apps	(Gls)
1997–1998	Bežanija		
1998–2005	Železnik	122	(8)
2005–2006	Bežanija		
2006	Mladenovac	12	(1)
2007	Drava Ptuj	1	(0)
- * Club domestic league appearances and goals

Dalibor Pešterac (Serbian Cyrillic: Далибор Пештерац; born 14 January 1976) is a former Serbian professional footballer who played as a defender. He spent most of his playing career with Železnik, winning the Serbia and Montenegro Cup in 2005.

== Statistics ==
Club	Season	League	
Club	Season	Apps	Goals
Železnik	1999–00	10	0
Železnik	2000–01	22	1
Železnik	2001–02	27	2
Železnik	2002–03	23	3
Železnik	2003–04	13	0
Železnik	2004–05	20	2
Železnik	Total	115	8
