= Bryan Verboom =

Belgian footballer

Personal information
- Date of birth: 30 January 1992 (age 34)
- Place of birth: Anderlecht, Belgium
- Height: 1.75 m (5 ft 9 in)
- Position: Left-back

Team information
- Current team: Andenne-Evelette SF

Youth career
- 2000–2008: Sporting Charleroi
- 2008–2013: Anderlecht

Senior career*
| Years | Team | Apps | (Gls) |
| 2012–2013 | Anderlecht | 0 | (0) |
| 2012–2013 | → Zulte Waregem (loan) | 20 | (1) |
| 2013–2019 | Zulte Waregem | 99 | (6) |
| 2017 | → Roda JC (loan) | 4 | (0) |
| 2017–2018 | → Kortrijk (loan) | 20 | (0) |
| 2019–2020 | RWDM47 | 7 | (0) |
| 2020 | La Louvière Centre | 2 | (0) |
| 2020–2021 | Aarau | 2 | (0) |
| 2023–2024 | Union Hutoise | 26 | (1) |
| 2024–2025 | Olympic Charleroi | 4 | (0) |
| 2025– | Andenne-Evelette SF | | |

International career
| 2012–2013 | Belgium U21 | 5 | (0) |
- * Club domestic league appearances and goals as of 6 June 2025

Bryan Verboom (born 30 January 1992) is a Belgian footballer who plays as left-back for the amateur club Andenne-Evelette SF. He is a former Belgium U21 international.

== Career ==
=== Early career ===
Verboom started his career at Sporting Charleroi before joining Anderlecht.

=== Zulte Waregem ===
He joined Zulte Waregem on loan in 2012. He played his first official match the 27 October 2012 against Waasland-Beveren and scored his first goal against Sporting Charleroi a few days later. During his loan spell he scored 1 goal in 20 games during an impressive loan spell.

Zulte-Waregem exercised their loan option to sign Verboom and signed Verboom on a permanent deal from Anderlecht in 2013. He helped Zulte-Waregem to a second-place finish in the Belgian League to help them qualify for The Champions League in his first season at the club, however they were knocked out by Dutch side PSV Eindhoven as a result Waregem dropped in the UEFA Europa League. During the 2013/14 season, Verboom finished runner up in the Belgian Cup Final after losing to Lokeren in a 1–0 defeat.

Verboom's impressive form at left back also saw Waregem qualify for the 2014–15 UEFA Europa League qualifiers also.

== International career ==
Verboom was born in Belgium and is of Congolese descent. Verboom was capped by Belgium U21s in 2012.

== Honours ==
- Belgian Pro League:
  - Runners-up: 2012–13
- Belgian Cup:
  - Runners-up: 2013–14
