= Lukáš Mareček =

Czech footballer (born 1990)

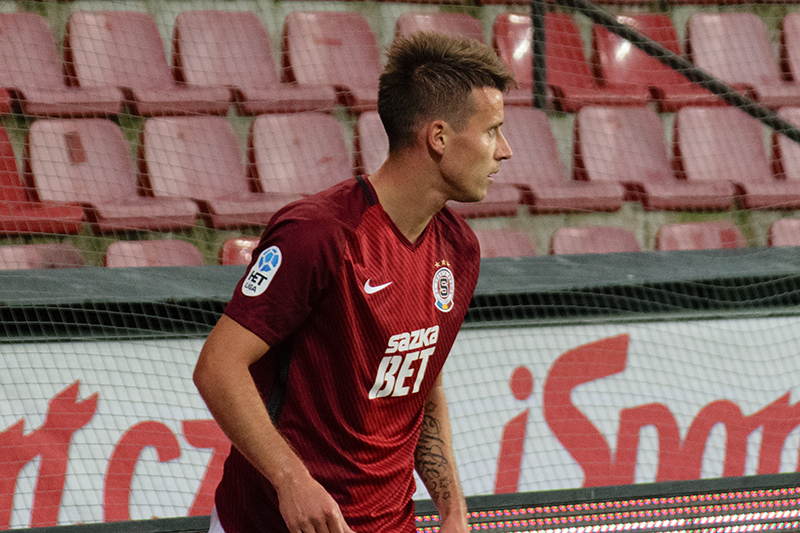

Personal information
- Full name: Lukáš Mareček
- Date of birth: 17 April 1990 (age 36)
- Place of birth: Ivančice, Czechoslovakia
- Height: 1.82 m (6 ft 0 in)
- Positions: Midfielder; defender

Team information
- Current team: Teplice
- Number: 23

Youth career
- 1995–1996: Domašov
- 1996–2007: FC Zbrojovka Brno

Senior career*
| Years | Team | Apps | (Gls) |
| 2007–2010 | FC Zbrojovka Brno | 50 | (0) |
| 2010–2013 | Anderlecht | 28 | (0) |
| 2012–2013 | → SC Heerenveen (loan) | 25 | (2) |
| 2013–2018 | Sparta Prague | 100 | (1) |
| 2018–2020 | Lokeren | 35 | (3) |
| 2020– | Teplice | 145 | (5) |

International career^{‡}
| 2005–2006 | Czech Republic U-16 | 13 | (1) |
| 2006–2007 | Czech Republic U-17 | 13 | (3) |
| 2007 | Czech Republic U-18 | 5 | (0) |
| 2007–2008 | Czech Republic U-19 | 9 | (0) |
| 2009 | Czech Republic U-20 | 4 | (0) |
| 2008–2012 | Czech Republic U-21 | 23 | (1) |
| 2016– | Czech Republic | 3 | (0) |
- * Club domestic league appearances and goals as of 27 May 2026 ‡ National team caps and goals as of 24 March 2016

Lukáš Mareček (Czech pronunciation: [ˈlukaːʃ ˈmarɛtʃɛk]; born 17 April 1990) is a Czech footballer who plays for Teplice. He is member of the Czech under-21 team. He represented the team at the 2011 UEFA European Under-21 Football Championship.

== Career ==
On 26 January 2010, Mareček signed for R.S.C. Anderlecht from FC Zbrojovka Brno on a contract lasting until June 2014. On 29 August 2012, he was sent on loan to SC Heerenveen for one season.
