= Jonathan Vervoort =

Belgian footballer (born 1993)

Personal information
- Full name: Jonathan Stefan Vervoort
- Date of birth: 13 August 1993 (age 33)
- Place of birth: Brussels, Belgium
- Height: 1.84 m (6 ft 0 in)
- Position: Centre-back

Team information
- Current team: Hamme
- Number: 2

Youth career
- 2001–2003: Anderlecht
- 2003–2004: Denderleeuw EH
- 2004–2005: Eendracht Aalst
- 2005–2011: Anderlecht

Senior career*
Years	Team	Apps	(Gls)
2012–2013	Anderlecht	0	(0)
2012–2013	→ Eindhoven (loan)	19	(0)
2013–2015	Sporting Charleroi	11	(0)
2015–2016	Nordsjælland	1	(0)
2017–2019	Dender EH	53	(2)
2019–2020	Roeselare	19	(1)
2021	RoPS	9	(0)
2022–2023	Rupel Boom	26	(0)
2024–2025	KFC Voorde-Appelterre	20	(2)
2025–	Hamme	0	(0)

International career
2011	Belgium U18	2	(0)
2011–2012	Belgium U19	14	(0)
2012–2013	Belgium U21	4	(0)
- * Club domestic league appearances and goals as of 11:17, 22 January 2026 (UTC)

Jonathan Stefan Vervoort (born 13 August 1993) is a Belgian professional footballer who plays as a centre back for Hamme.

== Club career ==
Vervoort started playing football in Anderlecht's youth academy. However, he transitioned to Denderleeuw EH and later Eendracht Aalst. After two seasons away, the Vervoort rejoined the ranks of the Anderlecht youth teams. Notably, he participated in the TV program De school van Lukaku in 2010, which provided audiences with a glimpse into his journey as a footballer.

In 2012, Vervoort was sent on loan to Dutch Eerste Divisie club FC Eindhoven. Vervoort's professional debut followed on 14 September 2012, in a match against Helmond Sport, forming a defensive partnership with Sjors Paridaans at centre-back.
