= Christophe Diandy =

Senegalese footballer

Personal information
- Full name: Christophe Diandy
- Date of birth: 25 November 1990 (age 35)
- Place of birth: Dakar, Senegal
- Height: 1.86 m (6 ft 1 in)
- Positions: Left-back; left midfielder

Team information
- Current team: Union Saint-Ghislain Tertre-Hautrage

Youth career
- 2003–2006: ASC Yego Dakar

Senior career*
Years	Team	Apps	(Gls)
2007–2008	Liberty Professionals	18	(8)
2009–2013	Anderlecht	15	(0)
2011–2012	→ OH Leuven (loan)	29	(0)
2012–2013	→ Charleroi (loan)	29	(0)
2013–2014	Mons	29	(1)
2014–2021	Charleroi	186	(2)
2021–2022	Mouscron	15	(1)
2024–	Union Saint-Ghislain Tertre-Hautrage	0	(0)

International career
- Senegal U21
- * Club domestic league appearances and goals as of 17:43, 7 July 2022 (UTC)

Christophe Diandy (born 25 November 1990) is a Senegalese professional footballer who plays as a left-back and left midfielder for Union Saint-Ghislain Tertre-Hautrage in the Belgian Division 3

== Career ==
Diandy began his career with AS Yego Dakar before spending two years with Liberty Professionals.

On 5 March 2009 he went on trial at Anderlecht, playing with the team at Torneo di Viareggio, and signed a contract six days later, on 11 March 2009.

== International career ==
He played with the Senegal U-21 and is member of the extended squad from the A team.

== Style of play ==
Diandy is a versatile player, he plays in the offensive midfield or on the left wing.
