= René Sterckx =

Belgian footballer

Personal information
- Full name: René Sterckx y Calle
- Date of birth: 18 January 1991 (age 35)
- Place of birth: Belgium
- Height: 1.79 m (5 ft 10 1/2 in)
- Position: Defensive midfielder

Youth career
- 1996–1999: KFC Strombeek
- 1999–2010: Anderlecht

Senior career*
Years	Team	Apps	(Gls)
2010–2013	Anderlecht	0	(0)
2010–2012	→ Zulte Waregem (loan)	10	(2)
2013	→ Waasland-Beveren (loan)	4	(0)
2013–2015	Waasland-Beveren	14	(1)
2015–2016	Cercle Brugge	9	(0)
2016–2018	Dender EH	36	(6)
2018–2019	Eendracht Aalst	29	(6)
2019–2020	SK Londerzeel		

International career
2009	Belgium U18	4	(3)
2010	Belgium U19	5	(1)
2010	Belgium U21	1	(0)
- * Club domestic league appearances and goals

René Sterckx (born 18 January 1991) is a Belgian professional football player with Spanish roots.

== Career ==
On 19 June 2010, he signed a three-year contract with Anderlecht, but was immediately loaned out for two consecutive seasons to Zulte Waregem. He joined Waasland-Beveren on a loan deal in January 2013 and six months later, agreed on a three-year deal to make his stay permanent.

On 15 July 2019, Sterckx joined SK Londerzeel. He left the club at the end of the season.
