= Dalibor Veselinović =

Serbian footballer (born 1987)

Personal information
- Full name: Dalibor Veselinović
- Date of birth: 21 September 1987 (age 39)
- Place of birth: Zadar, SR Croatia, SFR Yugoslavia
- Height: 1.96 m (6 ft 5 in)
- Position: Striker

Youth career
- Vojvodina

Senior career*
Years	Team	Apps	(Gls)
2005–2008	OFK Beograd	38	(4)
2007	→ Dinamo Vranje (loan)	6	(1)
2008–2009	Lens	4	(1)
2009–2010	Brussels	42	(28)
2011–2014	Anderlecht	14	(1)
2011–2012	→ Kortrijk (loan)	40	(12)
2012	→ Beerschot (loan)	10	(4)
2013–2014	→ Waasland-Beveren (loan)	31	(12)
2014–2016	Mechelen	84	(16)
2017	Incheon United	11	(0)
2018	Gazélec Ajaccio	8	(1)
2018–2019	Zrinjski Mostar	5	(0)
Total		293	(80)

International career
2006	Serbia and Montenegro U19	3	(2)
2007	Serbia U21	2	(0)
- * Club domestic league appearances and goals

Dalibor Veselinović (Serbian Cyrillic: Далибор Веселиновић; born 21 September 1987) is a Serbian retired professional footballer who played as a striker.

== Club career ==
Veselinović started his senior career with OFK Beograd, making his debut during the 2005–06 season. He spent three years at the club, except a six-month loan period with Dinamo Vranje in the 2006–07 season.

In the summer of 2008, Veselinović signed for French Ligue 2 side Lens. He played four league matches for the club and scored one goal.

In the summer of 2009, Veselinović moved to Belgium and signed with Brussels. After his fantastic performances for the Brussels-based club, he signed for their cross-city rivals Anderlecht in December 2010, penning a 4.5-year deal. Veselinović spent the following three seasons on loan with Kortrijk, Beerschot and Waasland-Beveren.

In June 2014, he signed a permanent contract with KV Mechelen. Veselinović left the club after two and a half years in January 2017, after which he signed with Incheon United FC. After Incheon, he played half a year for French club Gazélec Ajaccio.

On 24 August 2018, Veselinović signed a one-year contract with Premier League of Bosnia and Herzegovina club HŠK Zrinjski Mostar. After his contract with Zrinjski expired in May 2019, he decided to leave the club.

In August 2019, Veselinović ended his playing career at only the age of 31, stating that returning injuries were the biggest factor of that decision.

== International career ==
Veselinović holds Croatian and Serbian nationalities. He made two appearances for the Serbian national under-21 team in 2007.

== Honours ==
Lens

- Ligue 2: 2008–09

Anderlecht

- Belgian Super Cup: 2012
