= 2018–19 Oud-Heverlee Leuven season =

Oud-Heverlee Leuven
2018–19 season
- Owner: King Power International Group
- Chairman: (Belgium) Chris Vandebroeck
- Manager: (England) Nigel Pearson (until 3 February) (Belgium) Vincent Euvrard (from 8 February)
- Stadium: King Power at Den Dreef Stadium
- Belgian Cup: Round 5
- Top goalscorer: League: Frédéric Duplus & Mathieu Maertens (7 each); All: Frédéric Duplus & Mathieu Maertens (7 each)

The 2018–19 season was Oud-Heverlee Leuven's 17th competitive season in professional football and the team's third consecutive season at the second level following their relegation from the Belgian Pro League in 2016.

Although deemed as potential candidates for promotion at the start of the season, OH Leuven was never in contention and was always closer to the bottom of the table than to the top. After missing out on winning the opening tournament, going out early against amateur team Dessel Sport in the Belgian Cup and several disappointing results in the closing tournament, English coach Nigel Pearson was sacked in January 2019 and replaced by the duo of Vincent Euvrard (manager) and Franky Vercauteren (sports advisor).

After the change, despite scoring more points, the team was not able to avoid the relegation play-offs, however with four wins out of six matches, the club avoided relegation in the end.

== 2018–19 squad ==
- This section lists players who were in Oud-Heveree Leuven's first team squad at any point during the 2018–19 season
- The symbol § indicates player left mid-season
- The symbol # indicates player joined mid-season
- The symbol ¥ indicates a youngster who has appeared on the match sheet at least once during the season (possibly as unused substitute)
- Italics indicate loan player

No.	Nationality	Name	Position	Joined First Team	Previous club
Goalkeepers
1	(Belgium)	Nick Gillekens	GK	2015	Youth Squad
16	(Thailand)	Kawin Thamsatchanan	GK	2018	(Thailand) Muangthong United
26	(Belgium)	Laurent Henkinet	GK	2017	(Belgium) Waasland-Beveren
Defenders
2	(Belgium)	Dimitri Daeseleire	RB	2017	(Belgium) Antwerp
3	(Belgium) / (Democratic Republic of the Congo)	Derrick Tshimanga	LB	2017	(Netherlands) Willem II
4	(Belgium)	Kenneth Schuermans	CB	2017	(Belgium) Westerlo
5	(England)	Elliott Moore	CB	Loan	(England) Leicester City
12	(France)	Clément Fabre^{$}	CB	2017	(Belgium) Tubize
19	(France)	Frédéric Duplus	RB	2018	(France) Lens
21	(Germany)	Sascha Kotysch^{#}	CB	2019	(Belgium) Sint-Truiden
34	(Belgium)	Ahmed Touba	LB	Loan	(Belgium) Club Brugge
Midfielders
6	(Belgium)	David Hubert	CM	2017	(Belgium) Gent
11	(Belgium)	Joeri Dequevy	RW	2018	(Belgium) Antwerp
14	(France)	Samy Kehli	AM	2018	(Belgium) Lokeren
15	(Ghana)	Kamal Sowah	CM	Loan	(England) Leicester City
17	(France)	Julien Gorius	CM	2017	(China) Changchun Yatai
18	(Belgium)	Jellert van Landschoot	CM	Loan	(Belgium) Club Brugge
22	(Belgium)	Olivier Myny	LW / RW	2018	(Belgium) Waasland-Beveren
24	(Belgium)	Jarno Libert	CM	2017	Youth Squad
25	(Belgium)	Jenthe Mertens	CM	2017	Youth Squad
27	(France) / (Algeria)	Redouane Kerrouche	CM	2018	(France) Paris FC
28	(Belgium)	Koen Persoons	CM	2017	(Belgium) Lokeren
29	(Belgium)	Jo Gilis^{¥$}	AM / CF	2018	Youth Squad
30	(Poland)	Bartosz Kapustka	AM / LW / RW	Loan	(England) Leicester City
33	(Belgium)	Mathieu Maertens	CM / AM	2017	(Belgium) Cercle Brugge
39	(Ivory Coast)	Aboubakar Keita^{#}	CM / DM	Loan	(Denmark) Copenhagen
Forwards
7	(France) / (Benin)	Yannick Aguemon	CF / LW / RW	2017	(Belgium) Union SG
8	(Netherlands)	Sam Hendriks^{$}	CF	2018	(Netherlands) Go Ahead Eagles
9	(Belgium) / (Spain) / (Uruguay)	Esteban Casagolda^{$}	CF	2016	(Belgium) Dender EH
9 (Note: Henry played one match with shirt number 37 but changed to 9 following the transfer of Casagolda to Roeselare.)	(France)	Thomas Henry^{#}	CF	2019	(Belgium) Tubize
10	(England)	George Hirst	CF	2018	(England) Sheffield Wednesday
20	(Senegal)	Simon Diedhiou	CF	2017	(Belgium) Gent
23	(North Macedonia)	Jovan Kostovski	CF	2013	(North Macedonia) Vardar
32	(Belgium)	Daan Vekemans^{¥$}	CF	2018	Youth Squad
38	(Belgium)	Yanis Mbombo^{#}	CF	2019	(Belgium) Excel Mouscron

== Transfers ==
The first transfer news regarding the 2018–19 squad came in March, when Mechelen announced that despite their relegation from the Belgian First Division A, Ivorian defender Mamadou Bagayoko would remain at the team. He was already on loan from OH Leuven but would transfer permanently at the end of the season. One month later, another player left for Mechelen, as winger Nikola Storm signed a deal with the club to transfer there permanently after his loan from Club Brugge to OH Leuven would come to an end at the end of the 2017–18 season.

The month of May involved the first new reinforcements, as OH Leuven brought in two Belgian youngsters: Olivier Myny was signed from Waasland-Beveren while Jellert van Landschoot was loaned from Club Brugge. Meanwhile, Pepingen-Halle, playing in the Belgian Third Amateur Division, had announced the signing of third goalkeeper Andreas Suederick.

In June, with Samy Kehli and Elliott Moore, two players were kept that were on loan during the previous season. Kehli was signed permanently from Lokeren, while the loan deal of Moore was extended with one more season. On top of this, also two new players joined the club as French experienced defender Frédéric Duplus was signed from Lens, after already playing in Belgium for Zulte Waregem, White Star Brussels and Antwerp, followed by English youth international George Hirst from Sheffield Wednesday.

Early July, both Thomas Azevedo and Geert Berben moved to Lommel, their former team. Azevedo was already on loan to Lommel during the second half of the previous season and became a free agent player after his contract with OH Leuven ended, while Berben had been on loan to Oosterzonen Oosterwijk and was now sold. Later that same month, two youngsters left the squad, as striker Din Sula (who had been out on loan to Lommel) was signed by Waasland-Beveren and Jordy Gillekens was loaned to the youth squad of Fiorentina. The only incoming transfer in July was that of Dutch striker Sam Hendriks, arriving from Go Ahead Eagles. Later that summer, two players signed for Belgian First Amateur Division teams as their contracts had ended: experienced midfielder Flavien Le Postollec signed for Deinze, while youngster Jordy Lokando, who had returned from a loan to Heist, now moved permanently to RWDM47.

As was the case for the last few seasons already, OH Leuven was again active on transfer deadline day, signing no less than three players. While the interest of OH Leuven in French midfielder Redouane Kerrouche from Paris had been apparent already over the prior weeks and the signing therefore anticipated, the loan deals of youngsters Ahmed Touba (from Club Brugge) and especially Polish 14 times international Bartosz Kapustka (from Leicester City) to many came as more of a surprise.

Finally, throughout the summer some players did not have their contracts extended or saw their loan deals come to an end. Youngsters Dico Jap Tjong and Godwin Odibo were released, Benjamin Bambi and Leo Njengo returned from loans to Heist and Dessel Sport respectively, but were placed at the OH Leuven reserves. The loan deal of defender Benjamin Boulenger from Charleroi ended and was not prolonged neither.

During the 2018–19 winter transfer window, with the team suffering in the league while having a large squad, several transfers were expected on both incoming and outgoing side. The first transfer was however only announced mid-January and concerned a loan deal of Leo Njengo, who had been playing for the reserves so far this season and was given playing time with Belgian First Amateur Division-side Heist. Two incoming signings followed just after that, with central defender Sascha Kotysch and striker Thomas Henry. While Kotysch arrived from Sint-Truiden, the transfer of Henry was surprising as he was signed from direct opponents Tubize in the fight against relegation.

The final transfers of the 2018–19 season all happened in the last two days before closing of the transfer window. First another striker was brought into the squad with Yanis Mbombo, coming from Excel Mouscron. No mention was made whether it concerned a loan deal or a permanent move, only that Mbombo had signed a contract until the end of the season. On transfer deadline day, OH Leuven got rid of four strikers, first sending youngsters Jo Gilis and Daan Vekemans out on loan to Eendracht Aalst, followed by Dutchman Sam Hendriks who returned to his home country after just half a season, to play out on loan for Cambuur. In the final hours, 2016–17 club top scorer Esteban Casagolda was sold to league competitors Roeselare. The final day also involved one more incoming transfer with midfielder Aboubakar Keita arriving on loan from Copenhagen.

=== Transfers In ===
Date announced	Position	Nationality	Name	From	Fee	Ref.
24 May 2018	MF	(Belgium)	Jellert van Landschoot	(Belgium) Club Brugge	Loan	
31 May 2018	W	(Belgium)	Olivier Myny	(Belgium) Waasland-Beveren	Undisclosed	
7 June 2018	DF	(France)	Frédéric Duplus	Lens	Undisclosed	
14 June 2018	MF	(France)	Samy Kehli	(Belgium) Lokeren	Undisclosed	(Note: Kehli was already on loan from Lokeren to OH Leuven during the second half of the 2017–18 season. The loan ended and Kehli was transferred to OH Leuven on a permanent basis.)
20 June 2018	DF	(England)	Elliott Moore	(England) Leicester City	Loan Extended	(Note: Moore was already on loan from Leicester City to OH Leuven during the 2017–18 season. The loan was extended for another season.)
22 June 2018	FW	(England)	George Hirst	(England) Sheffield Wednesday	Undisclosed	
6 July 2018	FW	(Netherlands)	Sam Hendriks	(Netherlands) Go Ahead Eagles	Undisclosed	
31 August 2018	MF	(Poland)	Bartosz Kapustka	(England) Leicester City	Loan	
31 August 2018	MF	(France)	Redouane Kerrouche	(France) Paris	Undisclosed	
31 August 2018	DF	(Belgium)	Ahmed Touba	(Belgium) Club Brugge	Loan	
16 January 2019	DF	(Germany)	Sascha Kotysch	(Belgium) Sint-Truiden	Undisclosed	
17 January 2019	FW	(France)	Thomas Henry	(Belgium) Tubize	Undisclosed	
30 January 2019	FW	(Belgium)	Yanis Mbombo	(Belgium) Excel Mouscron	Undisclosed	
31 January 2019	MF	(Ivory Coast)	Aboubakar Keita	(Denmark) Copenhagen	Loan	

=== Transfers Out ===
Date announced	Position	Nationality	Name	To	Fee	Ref.
29 March 2018	DF	(Ivory Coast)	Mamadou Bagayoko	(Belgium) Mechelen	Undisclosed	(Note: Bagayoko was already on loan from OH Leuven to Mechelen since the winter 2017–18 transfer window and all parties now agreed to make the transfer permanent.)
30 April 2018	MF	(Belgium)	Nikola Storm	(Belgium) Club Brugge	Loan Return	
9 May 2018	GK	(Belgium)	Andreas Suederick	(Belgium) Pepingen-Halle	Free	
End of 2017–18 season	MF	(Belgium)	Benjamin Bambi	(Belgium) OH Leuven Reserves	Loan Return	(Note: Bambi was on loan from OH Leuven to Heist, the loan ended and Bambi returned to OH Leuven but was placed at the reserves.)
End of 2017–18 season	DF	(France)	Benjamin Boulenger	(Belgium) Charleroi	Loan Return	
End of 2017–18 season	MF	(Netherlands)	Dico Jap Tjong	Free Agent	Released	
End of 2017–18 season	FW	(Belgium)	Leo Njengo	(Belgium) OH Leuven Reserves	Loan Return	(Note: Njengo was on loan from OH Leuven to Dessel Sport, the loan ended and Njengo returned to OH Leuven but was placed at the reserves.)
End of 2017–18 season	MF	(Nigeria)	Godwin Odibo	Free Agent	Released	
2 July 2018	MF	(Belgium)	Geert Berben	(Belgium) Lommel	Undisclosed	
4 July 2018	W	(Belgium)	Thomas Azevedo	(Belgium) Lommel	Undisclosed	
10 July 2018	FW	(Belgium)	Din Sula	(Belgium) Waasland-Beveren	Undisclosed	(Note: Sula was on loan from OH Leuven to Lommel during the 2017-18 season. The loan ended and Sula was sold to Waasland-Beveren.)
24 July 2018	DF	(Belgium)	Jordy Gillekens	(Italy) Fiorentina	Loan	
1 August 2018	MF	(France)	Flavien Le Postollec	(Belgium) Deinze	Free	
25 August 2018	MF	(Belgium)	Jordy Lokando	(Belgium) RWDM47	Free	(Note: Lokando was on loan from OH Leuven to Heist during the 2017–18 season. After the loan ended, Lokando was released to RWDM47.)
15 January 2019	FW	(Belgium)	Leo Njengo	(Belgium) Heist	Loan	(Note: Njengo had been playing at the reserves for the first half of the season.)
31 January 2019	FW	(Belgium)	Esteban Casagolda	(Belgium) Roeselare	Undisclosed	
31 January 2019	FW	(Belgium)	Jo Gilis	(Belgium) Eendracht Aalst	Loan	
31 January 2019	FW	(Netherlands)	Sam Hendriks	(Netherlands) Cambuur	Loan	
31 January 2019	FW	(Belgium)	Daan Vekemans	(Belgium) Eendracht Aalst	Loan	

== Belgian First Division B ==
OHL's season in the Belgian First Division B began on 4 August 2018.

=== Results ===
2018–19 Belgian First Division B
Match Details	Home team	Result	Away team	Lineup	Unused Subs	Bookings
Opening tournament
4 August 2018; 17:00; King Power at Den Dreef Stadium; Leuven; Attendance: 6.749; Report	Oud-Heverlee Leuven	1-1	Mechelen	Thamsatchanan; Tshimanga, Moore, Schuermans, Duplus; Maertens, Persoons (78' Gilis), Van Landschoot; Aguemon (76' Libert), Hendriks, Hirst (80' Casagolda)	Henkinet; Daeseleire; Hubert; Mertens	(yellow card) 45+1' Schuermans; (yellow card) 83' Van Landschoot; (yellow card) 89' Persoons
4 August 2018; 17:00; King Power at Den Dreef Stadium; Leuven; Attendance: 6.749; Report	45+4' Duplus	1-0; 1-1	88' Cornet	Thamsatchanan; Tshimanga, Moore, Schuermans, Duplus; Maertens, Persoons (78' Gilis), Van Landschoot; Aguemon (76' Libert), Hendriks, Hirst (80' Casagolda)	Henkinet; Daeseleire; Hubert; Mertens	(yellow card) 45+1' Schuermans; (yellow card) 83' Van Landschoot; (yellow card) 89' Persoons
12 August 2018; 16:00; Stade Joseph Marien; Forest, Brussels; Attendance: 3.000; Report	Union SG	1-2	Oud-Heverlee Leuven	Thamsatchanan; Tshimanga, Moore, Schuermans, Duplus; Maertens (86' Hubert), Persoons, Van Landschoot; Aguemon, Hendriks (76' Casagolda), Hirst (75' Dequevy)	Henkinet; Daeseleire; Mertens; Sowah	(yellow card) 51' Moore; (yellow card) 73' Maertens
12 August 2018; 16:00; Stade Joseph Marien; Forest, Brussels; Attendance: 3.000; Report	26' Niakaté	0-1; 1-1; 1-2	12' Moore 90+1' Schuermans	Thamsatchanan; Tshimanga, Moore, Schuermans, Duplus; Maertens (86' Hubert), Persoons, Van Landschoot; Aguemon, Hendriks (76' Casagolda), Hirst (75' Dequevy)	Henkinet; Daeseleire; Mertens; Sowah	(yellow card) 51' Moore; (yellow card) 73' Maertens
19 August 2018; 16:00; King Power at Den Dreef Stadium; Leuven; Attendance: 4.819; Report	Oud-Heverlee Leuven	1-1	Beerschot Wilrijk	Thamsatchanan; Tshimanga (63' Dequevy), Moore, Schuermans, Duplus; Maertens (46' Hubert), Persoons, Van Landschoot; Aguemon, Hendriks (90+2' Gorius), Hirst	Henkinet; Casagolda; Daeseleire; Mertens	(yellow card) 23' Maertens; (yellow card) 36' Hirst; (yellow card) 51' Persoons; (yellow card) 53' Hubert; (yellow card) 70' Dequevy
19 August 2018; 16:00; King Power at Den Dreef Stadium; Leuven; Attendance: 4.819; Report	13' Hirst	1-0; 1-1	68' Vancamp	Thamsatchanan; Tshimanga (63' Dequevy), Moore, Schuermans, Duplus; Maertens (46' Hubert), Persoons, Van Landschoot; Aguemon, Hendriks (90+2' Gorius), Hirst	Henkinet; Casagolda; Daeseleire; Mertens	(yellow card) 23' Maertens; (yellow card) 36' Hirst; (yellow card) 51' Persoons; (yellow card) 53' Hubert; (yellow card) 70' Dequevy
1 September 2018; 17:00; King Power at Den Dreef Stadium; Leuven; Attendance: 4.431; Report	Oud-Heverlee Leuven	1-3	Westerlo	Thamsatchanan; Tshimanga, Moore, Schuermans, Duplus; Mertens (58' Kehli), Persoons (46' Kerrouche), Sowah; Aguemon, Hendriks, Hirst (69' Casagolda)	N. Gillekens; Daeseleire; Dequevy; Gorius	(yellow card) 37' Persoons
1 September 2018; 17:00; King Power at Den Dreef Stadium; Leuven; Attendance: 4.431; Report	59' Duplus	0-1; 1-1; 1-2; 1-3	42' Abrahams 64' Ghandri; 68' Naessens	Thamsatchanan; Tshimanga, Moore, Schuermans, Duplus; Mertens (58' Kehli), Persoons (46' Kerrouche), Sowah; Aguemon, Hendriks, Hirst (69' Casagolda)	N. Gillekens; Daeseleire; Dequevy; Gorius	(yellow card) 37' Persoons
8 September 2018; 17:00; Soevereinstadion; Lommel; Attendance: 1.500; Report	Lommel	1-1	Oud-Heverlee Leuven	Thamsatchanan; Touba, Fabre, Duplus, Moore, Daeseleire (86' Schuermans); Gorius, Kerrouche, Van Landschoot; Casagolda (82' Kostovski), Kehli (81' Hendriks)	N. Gillekens; Aguemon; Persoons; Tshimanga	(yellow card) 18' Van Landschoot; (yellow card) 50' Kerrouche; (yellow card) 57' Daeseleire; (yellow card) 67' Duplus
8 September 2018; 17:00; Soevereinstadion; Lommel; Attendance: 1.500; Report	68' Rocha	0-1; 1-1	23' Kehli	Thamsatchanan; Touba, Fabre, Duplus, Moore, Daeseleire (86' Schuermans); Gorius, Kerrouche, Van Landschoot; Casagolda (82' Kostovski), Kehli (81' Hendriks)	N. Gillekens; Aguemon; Persoons; Tshimanga	(yellow card) 18' Van Landschoot; (yellow card) 50' Kerrouche; (yellow card) 57' Daeseleire; (yellow card) 67' Duplus
15 September 2018; 17:00; Stade Leburton; Tubize; Attendance: 750; Report	Tubize	3-1	Oud-Heverlee Leuven	Thamsatchanan; Touba, Fabre (19' Schuermans), Moore, Duplus; Kehli (46' Kerrouche), Persoons, Van Landschoot; Aguemon, Casagolda (67' Hirst), Kapustka	N. Gillekens; Hendriks; Kostovski; Maertens	(yellow card) 56' Persoons; (yellow card) 57' Moore; (yellow card) 31' (yellow-red card) 90+1' Duplus
15 September 2018; 17:00; Stade Leburton; Tubize; Attendance: 750; Report	2' Vidémont; 17' Henry 89' Garlito	1-0; 2-0; 2-1; 3-1	78' Kerrouche	Thamsatchanan; Touba, Fabre (19' Schuermans), Moore, Duplus; Kehli (46' Kerrouche), Persoons, Van Landschoot; Aguemon, Casagolda (67' Hirst), Kapustka	N. Gillekens; Hendriks; Kostovski; Maertens	(yellow card) 56' Persoons; (yellow card) 57' Moore; (yellow card) 31' (yellow-red card) 90+1' Duplus
22 September 2018; 20:30; King Power at Den Dreef Stadium; Leuven; Attendance: 3.995; Report	Oud-Heverlee Leuven	0-2	Roeselare	Thamsatchanan; Tshimanga, Moore, Schuermans (81' Hendriks), Daeseleire; Gorius (56' Maertens), Kerrouche, Van Landschoot; Kapustka, Kehli (61' Dequevy), Kostovski	N. Gillekens; Casagolda; Hubert; Touba	(yellow card) 39' Van Landschoot; (yellow card) 52' Kerrouche; (yellow card) 54' Schuermans
22 September 2018; 20:30; King Power at Den Dreef Stadium; Leuven; Attendance: 3.995; Report		0-1; 0-2	25' Van Acker; 55' Aoulad (p)	Thamsatchanan; Tshimanga, Moore, Schuermans (81' Hendriks), Daeseleire; Gorius (56' Maertens), Kerrouche, Van Landschoot; Kapustka, Kehli (61' Dequevy), Kostovski	N. Gillekens; Casagolda; Hubert; Touba	(yellow card) 39' Van Landschoot; (yellow card) 52' Kerrouche; (yellow card) 54' Schuermans
30 September 2018; 16:00; King Power at Den Dreef Stadium; Leuven; Attendance: 3.617; Report	Oud-Heverlee Leuven	1-3	Union SG	Thamsatchanan; Touba, Schuermans, Moore, Daeseleire; Kerrouche (55' Dequevy), Maertens, Van Landschoot; Kapustka, Kehli (63' Hendriks), Kostovski (73' Casagolda)	N. Gillekens; Gorius; Hubert; Tshimanga	(yellow card) 71' Kostovski; (yellow card) 73' Dequevy; (yellow card) 76' Casagolda; (yellow card) 78' Kapustka; (yellow card) 89' Schuermans
30 September 2018; 16:00; King Power at Den Dreef Stadium; Leuven; Attendance: 3.617; Report	86' Kapustka (p)	0-1; 0-2; 0-3; 1-3	8' Niakaté; 34' Niakaté; 56' Niakaté	Thamsatchanan; Touba, Schuermans, Moore, Daeseleire; Kerrouche (55' Dequevy), Maertens, Van Landschoot; Kapustka, Kehli (63' Hendriks), Kostovski (73' Casagolda)	N. Gillekens; Gorius; Hubert; Tshimanga	(yellow card) 71' Kostovski; (yellow card) 73' Dequevy; (yellow card) 76' Casagolda; (yellow card) 78' Kapustka; (yellow card) 89' Schuermans
5 October 2018; 16:00; AFAS-stadion Achter de Kazerne; Mechelen; Attendance: 13.001; Report	Mechelen	3-0	Oud-Heverlee Leuven	Thamsatchanan; Touba, Duplus, Moore, Daeseleire ('78 Schuermans); Gorius, Kapustka, Van Landschoot; Dequevy, Kehli (46' Maertens), Kostovski (46' Hirst)	N. Gillekens; Hendriks; Hubert; Kerrouche	(yellow card) 39' Kapustka; (yellow card) 44' Moore
5 October 2018; 16:00; AFAS-stadion Achter de Kazerne; Mechelen; Attendance: 13.001; Report	26' Schoofs; 30' Engvall; 51' Togui	1-0; 2-0; 3-0		Thamsatchanan; Touba, Duplus, Moore, Daeseleire ('78 Schuermans); Gorius, Kapustka, Van Landschoot; Dequevy, Kehli (46' Maertens), Kostovski (46' Hirst)	N. Gillekens; Hendriks; Hubert; Kerrouche	(yellow card) 39' Kapustka; (yellow card) 44' Moore
13 October 2018; 17:00; King Power at Den Dreef Stadium; Leuven	Oud-Heverlee Leuven	PP (Note: The matches of the tenth matchday in the weekend of 13–14 October 2018 were postponed by nearly two weeks to 30–31 October following an ongoing investigation into match-fixing during the 2017-18 season, most notably involving Mechelen.)	Lommel			
19 October 2018; 20:30; Het Kuipje; Westerlo; Attendance: 2.500; Report	Westerlo	0-1	Oud-Heverlee Leuven	N. Gillekens; Tshimanga, Schuermans, Moore, Duplus; Gorius, Hubert, Libert; Dequevy (83' Myny), Hirst (88' Hendriks), Kapustka (46' Kehli)	Henkinet; Kerrouche; Laes; Van Landschoot	(yellow card) 60' Dequevy
19 October 2018; 20:30; Het Kuipje; Westerlo; Attendance: 2.500; Report		0-1	5' Moore	N. Gillekens; Tshimanga, Schuermans, Moore, Duplus; Gorius, Hubert, Libert; Dequevy (83' Myny), Hirst (88' Hendriks), Kapustka (46' Kehli)	Henkinet; Kerrouche; Laes; Van Landschoot	(yellow card) 60' Dequevy
26 October 2018; 20:30; Olympic Stadium; Antwerp; Attendance: 5.500; Report	Beerschot Wilrijk	3-1	Oud-Heverlee Leuven	N. Gillekens; Tshimanga, Moore, Schuermans, Duplus; Gorius (56' Maertens), Hubert, Libert; Dequevy, Hirst (77' Hendriks), Kehli (57' Myny)	Henkinet; Casagolda; Laes; Van Landschoot	(yellow card) 83' Duplus; (yellow card) 88' Schuermans
26 October 2018; 20:30; Olympic Stadium; Antwerp; Attendance: 5.500; Report	11' Tissoudali; 18' Noubissi; 49' Noubissi	1-0; 2-0; 3-0; 3-1	73' Duplus	N. Gillekens; Tshimanga, Moore, Schuermans, Duplus; Gorius (56' Maertens), Hubert, Libert; Dequevy, Hirst (77' Hendriks), Kehli (57' Myny)	Henkinet; Casagolda; Laes; Van Landschoot	(yellow card) 83' Duplus; (yellow card) 88' Schuermans
31 October 2018; 20:30; King Power at Den Dreef Stadium; Leuven	Oud-Heverlee Leuven	PP (Note: The match between OH Leuven and Lommel was postponed again, following the death of Vichai Srivaddhanaprabha as part of the 2018 Leicester helicopter crash.)	Lommel			
3 November 2018; 17:00; King Power at Den Dreef Stadium; Leuven; Attendance: 3.847; Report	Oud-Heverlee Leuven	4-1	Tubize	N. Gillekens; Tshimanga, Moore, Schuermans, Duplus; Hubert, Libert (62' Myny), Maertens; Dequevy (84' Hendriks), Hirst (83' Casagolda), Kapustka	Henkinet; Gorius; Kehli; Kerrouche	(yellow card) 58' Duplus; (yellow card) 71' Maertens
3 November 2018; 17:00; King Power at Den Dreef Stadium; Leuven; Attendance: 3.847; Report	10' Tshimanga 69' Duplus; 74' Dequevy; 90+2' Casagolda	1-0; 1-1; 2-1; 3-1; 4-1	27' Agyiri	N. Gillekens; Tshimanga, Moore, Schuermans, Duplus; Hubert, Libert (62' Myny), Maertens; Dequevy (84' Hendriks), Hirst (83' Casagolda), Kapustka	Henkinet; Gorius; Kehli; Kerrouche	(yellow card) 58' Duplus; (yellow card) 71' Maertens
9 November 2018; 20:30; Schiervelde Stadion; Roeselare; Attendance: 2.218; Report	Roeselare	0-4	Oud-Heverlee Leuven	N. Gillekens; Tshimanga, Moore, Schuermans, Duplus; Hubert, Libert, Maertens; Hirst (81' Casagolda), Kapustka (75' Touba), Myny (50' Kehli)	Henkinet; Gorius; Hendriks; Van Landschoot	(yellow card) 45' Myny; (yellow card) 67' Libert
9 November 2018; 20:30; Schiervelde Stadion; Roeselare; Attendance: 2.218; Report		0-1; 0-2; 0-3; 0-4	8' Moore; 23' Maertens; 42' Kapustka; 43' Libert	N. Gillekens; Tshimanga, Moore, Schuermans, Duplus; Hubert, Libert, Maertens; Hirst (81' Casagolda), Kapustka (75' Touba), Myny (50' Kehli)	Henkinet; Gorius; Hendriks; Van Landschoot	(yellow card) 45' Myny; (yellow card) 67' Libert
Closing tournament
16 November 2018; 20:30; King Power at Den Dreef Stadium; Leuven; Attendance: 4.466; Report	Oud-Heverlee Leuven	1-2	Union SG	N. Gillekens; Tshimanga, Moore, Schuermans, Duplus; Hubert (84' Vekemans), Libert, Maertens; Casagolda (80' Hendriks), Dequevy (82' Touba), Kehli	Henkinet; Gilis; Gorius; Van Landschoot	(yellow card) 48' Libert; (yellow card) 90+3' Touba
16 November 2018; 20:30; King Power at Den Dreef Stadium; Leuven; Attendance: 4.466; Report	35' Maertens	0-1; 1-1; 1-2	42' Selemani (p) 42' Ferber	N. Gillekens; Tshimanga, Moore, Schuermans, Duplus; Hubert (84' Vekemans), Libert, Maertens; Casagolda (80' Hendriks), Dequevy (82' Touba), Kehli	Henkinet; Gilis; Gorius; Van Landschoot	(yellow card) 48' Libert; (yellow card) 90+3' Touba
25 November 2018; 16:00; Olympic Stadium; Antwerp; Attendance: 5.000; Report	Beerschot Wilrijk	3-2	Oud-Heverlee Leuven	N. Gillekens; Tshimanga, Moore, Schuermans, Duplus; Hubert (81' Hendriks), Libert (56' Myny), Maertens; Dequevy (56' Touba), Hirst, Kapustka	Henkinet; Casagolda; Gorius; Kehli	(yellow card) 42' Dequevy; (yellow card) 57' Tshimanga; (yellow card) 60' Kapustka; (yellow card) 76' Maertens; (yellow card) 85' Schuermans
25 November 2018; 16:00; Olympic Stadium; Antwerp; Attendance: 5.000; Report	6' Noubissi; 18' Noubissi 48' Van Hyfte	1-0; 2-0; 3-0; 3-1	41' Tshimanga 74' Maertens	N. Gillekens; Tshimanga, Moore, Schuermans, Duplus; Hubert (81' Hendriks), Libert (56' Myny), Maertens; Dequevy (56' Touba), Hirst, Kapustka	Henkinet; Casagolda; Gorius; Kehli	(yellow card) 42' Dequevy; (yellow card) 57' Tshimanga; (yellow card) 60' Kapustka; (yellow card) 76' Maertens; (yellow card) 85' Schuermans
1 December 2018; 20:30; King Power at Den Dreef Stadium; Leuven; Attendance: 2.500; Report	Oud-Heverlee Leuven	3-1	Lommel	N. Gillekens; Tshimanga, Moore, Schuermans, Duplus; Hubert, Libert (62' Gorius), Maertens (83' Myny); Dequevy (79' Kehli), Hirst, Kapustka	Henkinet; Casagolda; Kerrouche; Touba	(yellow card) 27' Tshimanga; (yellow card) 41' Kapustka; (yellow card) 67' Dequevy; (yellow card) 90+2' Schuermans
1 December 2018; 20:30; King Power at Den Dreef Stadium; Leuven; Attendance: 2.500; Report	26' Kapustka 67' Dequevy; 69' Duplus	1-0; 1-1; 2-1; 3-1	42' Claes	N. Gillekens; Tshimanga, Moore, Schuermans, Duplus; Hubert, Libert (62' Gorius), Maertens (83' Myny); Dequevy (79' Kehli), Hirst, Kapustka	Henkinet; Casagolda; Kerrouche; Touba	(yellow card) 27' Tshimanga; (yellow card) 41' Kapustka; (yellow card) 67' Dequevy; (yellow card) 90+2' Schuermans
Opening tournament (postponed match)
4 December 2018; 20:30; King Power at Den Dreef Stadium; Leuven; Attendance: 1.800; Report	Oud-Heverlee Leuven	1-2	Lommel	N. Gillekens; Touba, Moore (73' Sowah), Libert, Duplus; Gorius, Hubert, Kehli (79' Casagolda); Hirst (63' Kerrouche), Kapustka, Myny	Henkinet; Hendriks; Persoons; Van Landschoot	(yellow card) 36' Myny; (yellow card) 57' Moore; (yellow card) 79' Touba; (yellow card) 82' Kerrouche
4 December 2018; 20:30; King Power at Den Dreef Stadium; Leuven; Attendance: 1.800; Report	30' Gorius	0-1; 1-1; 1-2	25' Rocha 67' Rocha	N. Gillekens; Touba, Moore (73' Sowah), Libert, Duplus; Gorius, Hubert, Kehli (79' Casagolda); Hirst (63' Kerrouche), Kapustka, Myny	Henkinet; Hendriks; Persoons; Van Landschoot	(yellow card) 36' Myny; (yellow card) 57' Moore; (yellow card) 79' Touba; (yellow card) 82' Kerrouche
Closing tournament (continued)
7 December 2018; 20:30; Schiervelde Stadion; Roeselare; Attendance: 2.218; Report	Roeselare	3-1	Oud-Heverlee Leuven	N. Gillekens; Tshimanga, Schuermans, Libert, Duplus; Gorius (67' Myny), Hubert (74' Casagolda), Maertens; Dequevy (84' Kehli), Hirst, Kapustka	Henkinet; Mertens; Touba; Van Landschoot	(yellow card) 21' Kapustka; (yellow card) 35' Schuermans; (yellow card) 71' Hubert
7 December 2018; 20:30; Schiervelde Stadion; Roeselare; Attendance: 2.218; Report	35' Camargo; 63' De Smet; 77' Van Acker	0-1; 1-1; 2-1; 3-1	10' Maertens	N. Gillekens; Tshimanga, Schuermans, Libert, Duplus; Gorius (67' Myny), Hubert (74' Casagolda), Maertens; Dequevy (84' Kehli), Hirst, Kapustka	Henkinet; Mertens; Touba; Van Landschoot	(yellow card) 21' Kapustka; (yellow card) 35' Schuermans; (yellow card) 71' Hubert
14 December 2018; 20:30; King Power at Den Dreef Stadium; Leuven; Attendance: 4.250; Report	Oud-Heverlee Leuven	1-3	Mechelen	Henkinet; Tshimanga, Fabre, Schuermans, Duplus; Hubert, Libert (75' Van Landschoot), Maertens; Dequevy (46' Gorius), Hirst, Myny (75' Mertens)	N. Gillekens; Daeseleire; Hubert; Mertens	(yellow card) 35' (yellow-red card) 44' Hubert
14 December 2018; 20:30; King Power at Den Dreef Stadium; Leuven; Attendance: 4.250; Report	32' Hirst	0-1; 1-1; 1-2; 1-3	4' De Camargo 49' Swinkels; 61' De Camargo	Henkinet; Tshimanga, Fabre, Schuermans, Duplus; Hubert, Libert (75' Van Landschoot), Maertens; Dequevy (46' Gorius), Hirst, Myny (75' Mertens)	N. Gillekens; Daeseleire; Hubert; Mertens	(yellow card) 35' (yellow-red card) 44' Hubert
21 December 2018; 20:30; Het Kuipje; Westerlo; Attendance: 2.000; Report	Westerlo	0-0	Oud-Heverlee Leuven	Henkinet; Tshimanga, Fabre, Schuermans (66' Touba), Duplus, Mertens; Gorius, Libert, Maertens; Hirst (87' Casagolda), Kapustka (87' Aguemon)	N. Gillekens; Dequevy; Kerrouche; Van Landschoot	(yellow card) 36' Kapustka; (yellow card) 90' Touba
13 January 2019; 20:00; King Power at Den Dreef Stadium; Leuven; Attendance: 3.504; Report	Oud-Heverlee Leuven	0-2	Tubize	Henkinet; Tshimanga, Fabre, Schuermans, Duplus, Aguemon; Dequevy, Hubert, Kapustka (62' Gorius); Hirst (59' Kehli), Myny (46' Casagolda)	N. Gillekens; Moore; Persoons; Van Landschoot	(yellow card) 28' Kapustka; (yellow card) 66' Tshimanga; (yellow card) 80' Hubert; (red card) 82' Aguemon; (yellow card) 90+1' Schuermans
13 January 2019; 20:00; King Power at Den Dreef Stadium; Leuven; Attendance: 3.504; Report		0-1; 0-2	11' Goudiaby; 42' Henry	Henkinet; Tshimanga, Fabre, Schuermans, Duplus, Aguemon; Dequevy, Hubert, Kapustka (62' Gorius); Hirst (59' Kehli), Myny (46' Casagolda)	N. Gillekens; Moore; Persoons; Van Landschoot	(yellow card) 28' Kapustka; (yellow card) 66' Tshimanga; (yellow card) 80' Hubert; (red card) 82' Aguemon; (yellow card) 90+1' Schuermans
20 January 2019; 16:00; Stade Joseph Marien; Forest, Brussels; Attendance: 3.000; Report	Union SG	2-1	Oud-Heverlee Leuven	Henkinet; Tshimanga, Duplus, Kotysch, Moore, Mertens (86' Hirst); Gorius, Hubert (86' Persoons), Kapustka; Dequevy (86' Myny), Henry	N. Gillekens; Kehli; Schuermans; Van Landschoot	(yellow card) 41' Henry; (yellow card) 47' Kotysch; (yellow card) 56' Mertens
20 January 2019; 16:00; Stade Joseph Marien; Forest, Brussels; Attendance: 3.000; Report	32' Selemani; 82' Tabekou	0-1; 1-1; 2-1	28' Moore	Henkinet; Tshimanga, Duplus, Kotysch, Moore, Mertens (86' Hirst); Gorius, Hubert (86' Persoons), Kapustka; Dequevy (86' Myny), Henry	N. Gillekens; Kehli; Schuermans; Van Landschoot	(yellow card) 41' Henry; (yellow card) 47' Kotysch; (yellow card) 56' Mertens
27 January 2019; 16:00; Soevereinstadion; Lommel; Attendance: 1.530; Report	Lommel	2-3	Oud-Heverlee Leuven	Henkinet; Tshimanga, Duplus, Kotysch, Moore, Myny (79' Mertens); Gorius, Kapustka (78' Kehli), Persoons; Dequevy (85' Hubert), Henry	N. Gillekens; Hirst; Schuermans; Van Landschoot	(yellow card) 24' Tshimanga; (yellow card) 34' Kotysch
27 January 2019; 16:00; Soevereinstadion; Lommel; Attendance: 1.530; Report	23' Brebels 87' Heymans	1-0; 1-1; 1-2; 2-2; 2-3	32' Moore; 68' Dequevy 88' Persoons	Henkinet; Tshimanga, Duplus, Kotysch, Moore, Myny (79' Mertens); Gorius, Kapustka (78' Kehli), Persoons; Dequevy (85' Hubert), Henry	N. Gillekens; Hirst; Schuermans; Van Landschoot	(yellow card) 24' Tshimanga; (yellow card) 34' Kotysch
3 February 2019; 16:00; King Power at Den Dreef Stadium; Leuven; Attendance: 3.613; Report	Oud-Heverlee Leuven	0-1	Roeselare	Henkinet; Tshimanga, Duplus, Kotysch, Moore, Myny (76' Aguemon); Dequevy (46' Mbombo), Gorius, Kapustka, Persoons (34' Maertens); Henry	N. Gillekens; Hubert; Kehli; Van Landschoot	(yellow card) 88' Kotysch
3 February 2019; 16:00; King Power at Den Dreef Stadium; Leuven; Attendance: 3.613; Report		0-1	90' Valpoort	Henkinet; Tshimanga, Duplus, Kotysch, Moore, Myny (76' Aguemon); Dequevy (46' Mbombo), Gorius, Kapustka, Persoons (34' Maertens); Henry	N. Gillekens; Hubert; Kehli; Van Landschoot	(yellow card) 88' Kotysch
9 February 2019; 20:30; AFAS-stadion Achter de Kazerne; Mechelen; Attendance: 13.941; Report	Mechelen	2-1	Oud-Heverlee Leuven	Henkinet; Tshimanga, Duplus, Kotysch (88' Kehli), Moore; Hubert, Maertens, Persoons; Dequevy (77' Aguemon), Henry, Kapustka (88' Mbombo)	N. Gillekens; Libert; Schuermans; Van Landschoot	(yellow card) 37' Kotysch; (yellow card) 72' Persoons; (yellow card) 90+3' Moore; (yellow card) 90+3' Henry; (red card) 90+6' Hubert
9 February 2019; 20:30; AFAS-stadion Achter de Kazerne; Mechelen; Attendance: 13.941; Report	36' De Camargo; 84' Van Damme	0-1; 1-1; 2-1	24' Maertens	Henkinet; Tshimanga, Duplus, Kotysch (88' Kehli), Moore; Hubert, Maertens, Persoons; Dequevy (77' Aguemon), Henry, Kapustka (88' Mbombo)	N. Gillekens; Libert; Schuermans; Van Landschoot	(yellow card) 37' Kotysch; (yellow card) 72' Persoons; (yellow card) 90+3' Moore; (yellow card) 90+3' Henry; (red card) 90+6' Hubert
16 February 2019; 17:00; King Power at Den Dreef Stadium; Leuven; Attendance: 4.431; Report	Oud-Heverlee Leuven	3-0	Westerlo	Henkinet; Duplus, Kotysch, Schuermans; Tshimanga, Gorius, Maertens (90' Libert), Myny; Aguemon (83' Dequevy), Henry, Mbombo (74' Kapustka)	N. Gillekens; Kehli; Mertens; Van Landschoot	(yellow card) 29' Gorius; (yellow card) 76' Kapustka
16 February 2019; 17:00; King Power at Den Dreef Stadium; Leuven; Attendance: 4.431; Report	54' Henry; 57' Myny; 78' Maertens	1-0; 2-0; 3-0		Henkinet; Duplus, Kotysch, Schuermans; Tshimanga, Gorius, Maertens (90' Libert), Myny; Aguemon (83' Dequevy), Henry, Mbombo (74' Kapustka)	N. Gillekens; Kehli; Mertens; Van Landschoot	(yellow card) 29' Gorius; (yellow card) 76' Kapustka
24 February 2019; 16:00; Stade Leburton; Tubize; Attendance: 500; Report	Tubize	1-3	Oud-Heverlee Leuven	Henkinet; Duplus, Kotysch, Moore; Tshimanga, Gorius, Maertens, Myny; Aguemon (77' Kapustka), Henry (86' Hirst), Mbombo (49' Kehli)	N. Gillekens; Dequevy; Persoons; Schuermans	(yellow card) 41' Moore
24 February 2019; 16:00; Stade Leburton; Tubize; Attendance: 500; Report	42' Čabraja	1-0; 1-1; 1-2; 1-3	11' Aguemon 57' Kehli; 77' Tshimanga	Henkinet; Duplus, Kotysch, Moore; Tshimanga, Gorius, Maertens, Myny; Aguemon (77' Kapustka), Henry (86' Hirst), Mbombo (49' Kehli)	N. Gillekens; Dequevy; Persoons; Schuermans	(yellow card) 41' Moore
3 March 2019; 16:00; King Power at Den Dreef Stadium; Leuven; Attendance: 7.450; Report	Oud-Heverlee Leuven	2-2	Beerschot Wilrijk	Henkinet; Duplus, Kotysch, Moore; Tshimanga, Gorius, Maertens, Myny; Henry (86' Hirst), Kapustka (81' Aguemon), Kehli (81' Persoons)	N. Gillekens; Hubert; Mertens; Schuermans	(yellow card) 17' Tshimanga; (yellow card) 65' Henry
3 March 2019; 16:00; King Power at Den Dreef Stadium; Leuven; Attendance: 7.450; Report	68' Henry; 72' Duplus	0-1; 1-1; 2-1; 2-2	52' Hoffer 77' Van Hyfte	Henkinet; Duplus, Kotysch, Moore; Tshimanga, Gorius, Maertens, Myny; Henry (86' Hirst), Kapustka (81' Aguemon), Kehli (81' Persoons)	N. Gillekens; Hubert; Mertens; Schuermans	(yellow card) 17' Tshimanga; (yellow card) 65' Henry
Relegation play-offs
22 March 2019; 20:30; Soevereinstadion; Lommel; Attendance: 1.500; Report	Lommel	0-2	Oud-Heverlee Leuven	Henkinet; Hubert, Kotysch, Moore; Van Landschoot, Gorius, Maertens, Duplus; Dequevy (68' Keita), Henry (79' Mbombo), Kehli (90' Kostovski)	Thamsatchanan; Mertens; Persoons; Schuermans	
22 March 2019; 20:30; Soevereinstadion; Lommel; Attendance: 1.500; Report		0-1; 0-2	32' Duplus; 83' Maertens	Henkinet; Hubert, Kotysch, Moore; Van Landschoot, Gorius, Maertens, Duplus; Dequevy (68' Keita), Henry (79' Mbombo), Kehli (90' Kostovski)	Thamsatchanan; Mertens; Persoons; Schuermans	
29 March 2019; 20:30; King Power at Den Dreef Stadium; Leuven; Attendance: 3.971; Report	Oud-Heverlee Leuven	0-1	Tubize	Henkinet; Duplus, Kotysch, Moore; Tshimanga, Gorius (29' Keita), Maertens (46' Kapustka (85' not replaced)), Myny (78' Mbombo); Dequevy, Henry, Kehli	Thamsatchanan; Aguemon; Hubert; Van Landschoot	(yellow card) 58' Tshimanga
29 March 2019; 20:30; King Power at Den Dreef Stadium; Leuven; Attendance: 3.971; Report		0-1	74' Naah	Henkinet; Duplus, Kotysch, Moore; Tshimanga, Gorius (29' Keita), Maertens (46' Kapustka (85' not replaced)), Myny (78' Mbombo); Dequevy, Henry, Kehli	Thamsatchanan; Aguemon; Hubert; Van Landschoot	(yellow card) 58' Tshimanga
7 April 2019; 20:00; Schiervelde Stadion; Roeselare	Roeselare	2-2	Oud-Heverlee Leuven	Henkinet; Tshimanga, Kotysch, Moore, Duplus; Hubert, Keita, Maertens; Henry, Kehli (73' Aguemon), Mbombo	Thamsatchanan; Hirst; Myny; Persoons; Schuermans; Van Landschoot	(yellow card) 75' Henry; (yellow card) 90+3' Maertens
7 April 2019; 20:00; Schiervelde Stadion; Roeselare	21' Casagolda 76' Kocabaş	1-0; 1-1; 2-1; 2-2	54' Henry 79' Mbombo	Henkinet; Tshimanga, Kotysch, Moore, Duplus; Hubert, Keita, Maertens; Henry, Kehli (73' Aguemon), Mbombo	Thamsatchanan; Hirst; Myny; Persoons; Schuermans; Van Landschoot	(yellow card) 75' Henry; (yellow card) 90+3' Maertens
14 April 2019; 20:00; King Power at Den Dreef Stadium; Leuven	Oud-Heverlee Leuven	3-0	Roeselare	Henkinet; Hubert, Kotysch, Moore; Tshimanga, Keita, Maertens, Duplus; Aguemon (90+1' Kehli), Henry (85' Hirst), Mbombo (78' Persoons)	Thamsatchanan; Myny; Schuermans; Van Landschoot	(yellow card) 90+2' Keita
14 April 2019; 20:00; King Power at Den Dreef Stadium; Leuven	12' Mbombo; 29' Kotysch; 66' Henry	1-0; 2-0; 3-0		Henkinet; Hubert, Kotysch, Moore; Tshimanga, Keita, Maertens, Duplus; Aguemon (90+1' Kehli), Henry (85' Hirst), Mbombo (78' Persoons)	Thamsatchanan; Myny; Schuermans; Van Landschoot	(yellow card) 90+2' Keita
19 April 2019; 20:30; Stade Leburton; Tubize	Tubize	0-3	Oud-Heverlee Leuven	Henkinet; Hubert, Kotysch, Moore; Tshimanga, Keita (43' Persoons), Maertens, Duplus; Aguemon, Henry (77' Hirst), Mbombo (65' Kehli)	Thamsatchanan; Myny; Schuermans; Van Landschoot	(yellow card) 5' Keita; (yellow card) 47' Persoons
19 April 2019; 20:30; Stade Leburton; Tubize		0-1; 0-2; 0-3	3' Henry; 16' Hubert (p); 89' Hirst	Henkinet; Hubert, Kotysch, Moore; Tshimanga, Keita (43' Persoons), Maertens, Duplus; Aguemon, Henry (77' Hirst), Mbombo (65' Kehli)	Thamsatchanan; Myny; Schuermans; Van Landschoot	(yellow card) 5' Keita; (yellow card) 47' Persoons
26 April 2019; 20:30; King Power at Den Dreef Stadium; Leuven	Oud-Heverlee Leuven	1-0	Lommel	Henkinet; Hubert, Kotysch, Schuermans; Van Landschoot (73' Tshimanga), Libert, Maertens, Duplus; Aguemon (89' Persoons), Henry, Mbombo (65' Kehli)	Thamsatchanan; Hirst; Mertens; Myny	(yellow card) 64' Libert; (yellow card) 79' Duplus
26 April 2019; 20:30; King Power at Den Dreef Stadium; Leuven	77' Aguemon	1-0		Henkinet; Hubert, Kotysch, Schuermans; Van Landschoot (73' Tshimanga), Libert, Maertens, Duplus; Aguemon (89' Persoons), Henry, Mbombo (65' Kehli)	Thamsatchanan; Hirst; Mertens; Myny	(yellow card) 64' Libert; (yellow card) 79' Duplus

== Belgian Cup ==
=== Results ===
2018–19 Belgian Cup
Match Details	Home team	Result	Away team	Lineup	Cards
Round 5
25 August 2018; 20:00; Armand Melisstadion (Note: Order of legs reversed as non-professional team received home advantage.); Dessel; Report	Dessel Sport	3-1	Oud-Heverlee Leuven	N. Gillekens; Duplus, Fabre, Moore, Tshimanga; Maertens (66' Gorius), Persoons (46' Mertens), Sowah; Aguemon, Hendriks (52' Casagolda), Hirst	(yellow card) 21' Tshimanga; (yellow card) 52' (yellow-red card) 57' Fabre; (yellow card) 67' Aguemon
25 August 2018; 20:00; Armand Melisstadion; Dessel; Report	5' Lenaerts; 22' (p) Breugelmans 84' Vosters	1-0; 2-0; 2-1; 3-1	69' Aguemon	N. Gillekens; Duplus, Fabre, Moore, Tshimanga; Maertens (66' Gorius), Persoons (46' Mertens), Sowah; Aguemon, Hendriks (52' Casagolda), Hirst	(yellow card) 21' Tshimanga; (yellow card) 52' (yellow-red card) 57' Fabre; (yellow card) 67' Aguemon

== Squad statistics ==
Includes only competitive matches.

=== Appearances ===
Players with no appearances not included in the list.

No.	Pos.	Nat.	Name	First Division B		Belgian Cup		Relegation play-offs		Total	
No.	Pos.	Nat.	Name	Apps	Starts	Apps	Starts	Apps	Starts	Apps	Starts
1	GK	(Belgium)	Nick Gillekens	9	9	1	1	0	0	10	10
2	DF	(Belgium)	Dimitri Daeseleire	4	4	0	0	0	0	4	4
3	DF	(Belgium)	Derrick Tshimanga	23	23	1	1	5	4	29	28
4	DF	(Belgium)	Kenneth Schuermans	18	15	0	0	1	1	19	16
5	DF	(England)	Elliott Moore	23	23	1	1	5	5	29	29
6	MF	(Belgium)	David Hubert	16	13	0	0	5	5	21	18
7	MF	(France)	Yannick Aguemon	12	8	1	1	4	3	17	12
9	FW	(France)	Thomas Henry	7	7	0	0	6	6	13	13
10	FW	(England)	George Hirst	20	15	1	1	2	0	23	16
11	MF	(Belgium)	Joeri Dequevy	19	14	0	0	2	2	21	16
14	MF	(France)	Samy Kehli	18	9	0	0	6	3	24	12
15	MF	(Ghana)	Kamal Sowah	2	1	1	1	0	0	3	2
16	GK	(Thailand)	Kawin Thamsatchanan	9	9	0	0	0	0	9	9
17	MF	(France)	Julien Gorius	18	14	1	0	2	2	21	16
18	FW	(Belgium)	Jellert van Landschoot	9	8	0	0	2	2	11	10
19	DF	(France)	Frédéric Duplus	26	26	1	1	6	6	33	33
21	DF	(Germany)	Sascha Kotysch	7	7	0	0	6	6	13	13
22	MF	(Belgium)	Olivier Myny	16	9	0	0	1	1	17	10
23	FW	(North Macedonia)	Jovan Kostovski	4	3	0	0	1	0	5	3
24	MF	(Belgium)	Jarno Libert	13	11	0	0	1	1	14	12
25	DF	(Belgium)	Jenthe Mertens	5	3	1	0	0	0	6	3
26	GK	(Belgium)	Laurent Henkinet	10	10	0	0	6	6	16	16
27	MF	(France)	Redouane Kerrouche	6	3	0	0	0	0	6	3
28	MF	(Belgium)	Koen Persoons	10	8	1	1	3	0	14	9
30	MF	(Poland)	Bartosz Kapustka	20	18	0	0	1	0	21	18
33	MF	(Belgium)	Mathieu Maertens	20	16	1	1	6	6	27	23
34	DF	(Belgium)	Ahmed Touba	9	5	0	0	0	0	9	5
38	FW	(Belgium)	Yanis Mbombo	4	2	0	0	6	4	10	6
39	MF	(Ivory Coast)	Aboubakar Keita	0	0	0	0	5	3	5	3
Players that have appeared this season, who are out on loan or have left OH Leuven
8	FW	(Netherlands)	Sam Hendriks (on loan at Cambuur)	12	4	1	1	0	0	13	5
9	FW	(Belgium)	Esteban Casagolda (transferred to Roeselare)	13	3	1	0	0	0	14	3
29	FW	(Belgium)	Jo Gilis (on loan to Eendracht Aalst)	1	0	0	0	0	0	1	0
32	FW	(Belgium)	Daan Vekemans (on loan to Eendracht Aalst)	1	0	0	0	0	0	1	0

=== Goalscorers ===
Rank	Pos.	No.	Player	First Division B	Belgian Cup	Relegation play-offs	Total
1	DF	19	(France) Frédéric Duplus	6	0	1	7
1	MF	33	(Belgium) Mathieu Maertens	6	0	1	7
3	FW	9	(France) Thomas Henry	2	0	3	5
3	DF	5	(England) Elliott Moore	5	0	0	5
5	FW	7	(France) Yannick Aguemon	1	1	1	3
5	MF	11	(Belgium) Joeri Dequevy	3	0	0	3
5	FW	10	(England) George Hirst	2	0	1	3
5	MF	30	(Poland) Bartosz Kapustka	3	0	0	3
5	DF	3	(Belgium) Derrick Tshimanga	3	0	0	3
10	MF	14	(France) Samy Kehli	2	0	0	2
10	FW	38	(Belgium) Yanis Mbombo	0	0	2	2
12	FW	9	(Belgium) Esteban Casagolda	1	0	0	1
12	DF	17	(France) Julien Gorius	1	0	0	1
12	MF	6	(Belgium) David Hubert	0	0	1	1
12	DF	21	(Germany) Sascha Kotysch	0	0	1	1
12	MF	27	(France) Redouane Kerrouche	1	0	0	1
12	MF	24	(Belgium) Jarno Libert	1	0	0	1
12	MF	22	(Belgium) Olivier Myny	1	0	0	1
12	MF	28	(Belgium) Koen Persoons	1	0	0	1
12	DF	4	(Belgium) Kenneth Schuermans	1	0	0	1
Own Goals				0	0	0	0
Total				40	1	11	52

=== Clean sheets ===
No.	Player	First Division B	Belgian Cup	Relegation play-offs	Total clean sheets	% Clean sheet games	Goals conceded	Avg minutes between conceding
1	(Belgium) Nick Gillekens	2	0	0	2	20 %	18	50
16	(Thailand) Kawin Thamsatchanan	0	0	0	0	0 %	18	45
26	(Belgium) Laurent Henkinet	2	0	4	6	37.5 %	18	80
