= 2018–19 Belgian First Division B =

Third season of the Belgian First Division B

Belgian First Division B
- Season: 2018–19
- Champions: Mechelen
- Promoted: Mechelen
- Relegated: Tubize
- Top goalscorer: Leonardo Rocha (16 goals)
- Biggest home win: 9 matches (6x 3–0, 2x 4–1 & 1x 5–2)
- Biggest away win: Mechelen vs Union SG, 0–5
- Highest scoring: Beerschot-Wilrijk vs Tubize, 5–2

The 2018–19 season of the Belgian First Division B began in August 2018 and ended in April 2019. It was the third season of the First Division B following a change in league format from the old Belgian Second Division.

The season was impacted by the 2017–19 Belgian football fraud scandal which most notably involved Mechelen, as it was unclear upon completion of the season whether and how any involved clubs would be sanctioned and what the effect would be on the number of promotion and relegation places. As a result, Mechelen won the title and celebrated promotion on 16 March 2019, following a win over Beerschot Wilrijk in the promotion-playoffs, although the verdict on the investigation was still pending. End of May, Mechelen was found guilty and not allowed to be promoted, with runners-up Beerschot Wilrijk taking their spot instead. Mechelen appealed the decision at the Belgian Court for Sportsarbitration, which confirmed the verdict of guilt in July, but also ruled that according to the rules of the Belgian Football FA Mechelen could not be penalized with relegation back to the Belgian First Division A as the violation occurred during a previous season, hence Mechelen was allowed to keep its promotion.

== Team changes ==
=== In ===
- Mechelen were relegated from the 2017–18 Belgian First Division A after finishing in last place and return to the second level of Belgian football for the first time since the 2006–07 season.
- Lommel were promoted as 2017–18 Belgian First Amateur Division winners, immediately returning after being relegated from the 2016–17 Belgian First Division B.

=== Out ===
- Cercle Brugge won the promotion play-offs against Beerschot-Wilrijk and was thus promoted after three seasons at the second level.
- Lierse went bankrupt and dissolved as a team. Tubize had finished in last place in the relegation playoffs but were saved from relegation as a result of the bankruptcy of Lierse.

== Team information ==
=== Stadiums and locations ===
Locations of the 2018–19 Belgian First Division B teams

Matricule	Club	City	First season of current spell at second level	Coming from	2017-18 result	Stadium	Capacity
155	FCO Beerschot Wilrijk	Antwerp	2017–18	Belgian First Amateur Division	3rd (D1B)	Olympic Stadium	12,771
2554	Lommel SK	Lommel	2018–19	Belgian First Amateur Division	1st (D1Am)	Soevereinstadion	8,000
25	Mechelen	Mechelen	2018–19	Belgian First Division A	16th (D1A)	AFAS-stadion Achter de Kazerne	16,672
18	Oud-Heverlee Leuven	Leuven	2016–17	Belgian Pro League	2nd (D1B)	Den Dreef	10,000
134	K.S.V. Roeselare	Roeselare	2010–11	Belgian Pro League	5th (D1B)	Schiervelde Stadion	9,075
5632	A.F.C. Tubize	Tubize	2009–10	Belgian Pro League	8th (D1B)	Stade Leburton	9,000
10	R. Union Saint-Gilloise	Saint-Gilles, Brussels	2015–16	Belgian Third Division	6th (D1B)	Stade Joseph Marien	5,500
2024	K.V.C. Westerlo	Westerlo	2017–18	Belgian First Division A	7th (D1B)	Het Kuipje	8,035

=== Personnel and kits ===
Club	Manager	Captain	Kit Manufacturer	Sponsors
Beerschot Wilrijk	(Belgium) Stijn Vreven	(Belgium) Tom Pietermaat	Joma	DCA
Lommel	(Belgium) Tom Van Imschoot	(Belgium) Wouter Scheelen	Legea	United Telecom
Mechelen	(Belgium) Wouter Vrancken	(Belgium) Seth De Witte	Kappa	Telenet and AFAS
OH Leuven	(Belgium) Vincent Euvrard	(Belgium) Dimitri Daeseleire	Vermarc	King Power
Roeselare	(Spain) Juanito	(France) Raphaël Lecomte	Joma	Euro Shop
Tubize	(France) Philippe Thys	(Belgium) Quentin Laurent	Kappa	No shirt sponsor
Union SG	(Slovenia) Luka Elsner	(Belgium) Charles Morren	Patrick	Culture et Formation
Westerlo	(Belgium) Bob Peeters	(Belgium) Nicolas Rommens	Saller	Soudal

=== Managerial changes ===
Team	Outgoing manager	Manner of departure	Date of vacancy	Position	Replaced by	Date of appointment
Union SG	(Belgium) Marc Grosjean	Mutual consent	8 May 2018	Pre-season	(Slovenia) Luka Elsner	23 May 2018
Beerschot Wilrijk	(Belgium) Marc Brys	Signed by Sint-Truiden	21 May 2018	Pre-season	(Belgium) Stijn Vreven	25 May 2018
Mechelen	(Netherlands) Dennis van Wijk	Sacked	20 August 2018	7th	(Belgium) Wouter Vrancken	21 August 2018
Roeselare	(Spain) Jordi Condom	Sacked	10 November 2018	7th	(Spain) Nano	12 November 2018
Roeselare	(Spain) Nano	Release fee paid by Shanghai Greenland Shenhua	8 January 2019	Closing tournament: 4th Overall: 6th	(Spain) Juanito	11 January 2019
OH Leuven	(England) Nigel Pearson	Sacked	3 February 2019	Closing tournament: 7th Overall: 8th	(Belgium) Vincent Euvrard	8 February 2019

== League table ==
=== Opening tournament ===
Pos	Team	Pld	W	D	L	GF	GA	GD	Pts	Qualification	MEC	USG	B-W	LOM	WES	OHL	ROE	TUB
1	Mechelen	14	9	3	2	29	9	+20	30	Qualification to Promotion play-offs	—	2–1	3–0	1–2	2–0	3–0	3–0	1–0
2	Union SG	14	7	3	4	23	14	+9	24		2–2	—	2–0 (Note: The matches of the tenth matchday in the weekend of 13–14 October 2018 were postponed by nearly two weeks to 30–31 October following an ongoing investigation into match-fixing during the 2017-18 season, most notably involving Mechelen.)	1–1	2–0	1–2	2–0	3–2
3	Beerschot Wilrijk	14	7	3	4	19	19	0	24		1–0	1–0	—	1–3	1–1	3–1	2–1	1–0
4	Lommel	14	6	4	4	21	20	+1	22		0–3	1–0	1–2	—	0–1	1–1	3–1	2–2
5	Westerlo	14	6	1	7	16	20	−4	19		0–3	1–3	1–2	4–1	—	0–1	2–1	2–1
6	OH Leuven	14	4	3	7	19	24	−5	15		1–1	1–3	1–1	1–2 (Note: The match between OH Leuven and Lommel was postponed again, following the death of Vichai Srivaddhanaprabha as part of the 2018 Leicester helicopter crash.)	1–3	—	0–2	4–1
7	Roeselare	14	3	4	7	14	24	−10	13		2–2	1–1	2–1	2–2	0–1	0–4	—	2–1
8	Tubize	14	2	3	9	15	26	−11	9		0–3	0–2	3–3	0–2	2–0	3–1	0–0	—

Source: Belgian First Division B (in French and Dutch)
Rules for classification: 1) Points; 2) Matches won; 3) Goal difference; 4) Goals scored; 5) Away goals scored; 6) Away matches won; 7) Play-off.

=== Closing tournament ===
Pos	Team	Pld	W	D	L	GF	GA	GD	Pts	Qualification	B-W	MEC	USG	ROE	WES	OHL	TUB	LOM
1	Beerschot Wilrijk	14	8	6	0	29	14	+15	30	Qualification to Promotion play-offs	—	0–0	3–1	1–1	1–1	3–2	5–2	3–0
2	Mechelen	14	8	5	1	26	16	+10	29		1–1	—	0–5	2–2	3–0	2–1	3–1	3–2
3	Union SG	14	6	3	5	18	15	+3	21		1–1	1–2	—	1–2	0–0	2–1	1–0	1–0 (Note: Match postponed from 2 February 2019 to 6 February due to excessive snow.)
4	Roeselare	14	5	5	4	19	17	+2	20		1–2	0–0	1–1	—	1–1	3–1	0–1	4–2
5	Westerlo	14	3	6	5	12	17	−5	15		1–2	1–3	2–0	2–0	—	0–0	1–0	2–2
6	OH Leuven	14	4	2	8	21	24	−3	14		2–2	1–3	1–2	0–1	3–0	—	0–2	3–1
7	Tubize	14	4	2	8	13	22	−9	14		1–3	0–3	2–0	3–2	0–0	1–3	—	0–0
8	Lommel	14	2	3	9	15	29	−14	9		0–2	1–1	0–2	0–1	2–1	2–3	1–0	—

Source: Belgian First Division B (in French and Dutch)
Rules for classification: 1) Points; 2) Matches won; 3) Goal difference; 4) Goals scored; 5) Away goals scored; 6) Away matches won; 7) Play-off.

=== Aggregate table ===
Pos	Team	Pld	W	D	L	GF	GA	GD	Pts	Qualification
1	Mechelen	28	17	8	3	55	25	+30	59	Qualification to Promotion play-offs (Note: The team that promotes to the 2019–20 Belgian First Division A, either by winning the promotion playoff or by winning both the opening and the closing tournament, will not take part in the Europa League play-offs. The next team in the league will take its spot instead.)
2	Beerschot Wilrijk	28	15	9	4	48	33	+15	54	Qualification to Promotion play-offs
3	Union SG	28	13	6	9	41	29	+12	45	Qualification to Europa League play-offs
4	Westerlo	28	9	7	12	28	37	−9	34	Qualification to Europa League play-offs
5	Roeselare	28	8	9	11	33	41	−8	33	Qualification to Relegation play-offs (Note: In case the team that wins the promotion playoff finishes in the bottom four, the 4th placed team will play the relegation playoff instead.)
6	Lommel	28	8	7	13	34	46	−12	31	Qualification to Relegation play-offs
7	OH Leuven	28	8	5	15	40	48	−8	29	Qualification to Relegation play-offs
8	Tubize	28	6	5	17	28	48	−20	23	Qualification to Relegation play-offs

Source: Belgian First Division B (in French and Dutch)
Rules for classification: 1) Points; 2) Matches won; 3) Goal difference; 4) Goals scored; 5) Away goals scored; 6) Away matches won; 7) Play-off.

=== Promotion play-offs ===
The winners of the opening tournament and the closing tournament will meet in a two-legged match to determine the division champion, who will promote to the 2019–20 Belgian First Division A. The team finishing highest in the aggregate table will be allowed to play the second leg at home. In case a single team wins both the opening and the closing tournament, that team will be promoted automatically and no play-offs will be organized.

On 9 November 2018, Mechelen won the opening tournament and was therefore assured of playing at least the promotion play-offs. On the final day of the closing tournament, Mechelen only managed a draw away to Lommel, allowing Beerschot Wilrijk to win the closing period. If Mechelen had won they would have assured direct promotion, instead they had to face Beerschot-Wilrijk in the promotion play-offs.

The first leg saw both teams having chances, with goalkeeper Michael Verrips making big saves in the first half to deny attempts by Erwin Hoffer and Gertjan De Mets, while in the second half Mechelen failed to take advantage of a red card for Jan Van den Bergh. In the second leg, Beerschot-Wilrijk again saw a player sent off following a vicious tackle by Marius Noubissi already after 32 minutes. Nikola Storm opened the score for Mechelen just after the start of the second half, but ten-men Beerschot-Wilrijk managed the equalizer through penalty kick and looked on its way to promote via the away goals rule, when substitute Clément Tainmont scored a volley just two minutes from time to win the match and send Mechelen back to the highest division after just one season in the Belgian First Division B. With that, Beerschot Wilrijk lost the promotion play-offs for the second consecutive year. Several weeks later, Mechelen was found guilty of match-fixing and not allowed to promote as a result, with Beerschot-Wilrijk taking their spot. Mechelen appealed the decision successfully, as per the rules of the Belgian FA they could no longer be punished for events of more than one year in the past.

9 March 2019
20:30

Beerschot Wilrijk	0–0	Mechelen
Prychynenko (yellow card) 49'; Van den Bergh (yellow card) 54' (yellow-red card) 60'	Report	Van Damme (yellow card) 31'; Cornet (yellow card) 81'; Engvall (yellow card) 90+2'; Lemoine (yellow card) 90+3'

Olympic Stadium, Antwerp
Attendance: 10,700
Referee: Erik Lambrechts

16 March 2019
16:00

Mechelen	2–1	Beerschot Wilrijk
Storm 46'; Tainmont 88'; Engvall (yellow card) 90+3'	Report	Noubissi (red card) 32'; De Jonghe (yellow card) 45'; Vanzeir 64' (pen.); Vanzeir (yellow card) 64'; Grisez (yellow card) 90+3'; Prychynenko (yellow card) 90+4'

Achter de Kazerne, Mechelen
Attendance: 16,298
Referee: Lawrence Visser

Mechelen won 2–1 on aggregate.

=== Relegation play-offs ===
The four bottom teams in the aggregate table took part in the relegation play-offs in which they kept half of the points they collected during the overall regular season (rounded up). As a result, the teams started with the following points before the playoff: Roeselare 17 points, Lommel 16, OH Leuven 15, and Tubize 12. As the points of all teams were rounded up, the half-point deduction was irrelevant in the case of ties. Tubize started the play-offs strongest, with 2 draws and a win, resulting in no team being safe after three matchdays. On matchday 4, Lommel became the first team to be certain of avoiding relegation following a 3–0 home win over Tubize. Standings after that matchday were Lommel at 23, OH Leuven at 22, Roeselare at 19, and Tubize at 17 (with Lommel ahead of Tubize in case of ties due to finishing higher in the regular season aggregate table). On matchday 5, Tubize was relegated as they first lost at home to OH Leuven 0–3, after which they needed Roeselare to drop points at Lommel two days later. A 0–1 away win of Roeselare meant Tubize was relegated to the Belgian First Amateur Division and the final matchday was irrelevant, only for Roeselare to overtake Lommel in the final standings.

Pos	Team	Pld	W	D	L	GF	GA	GD	Pts	Qualification	OHL	ROE	LOM	TUB
1	OH Leuven	6	4	1	1	11	3	+8	28		—	3–0	1–0	0–1
2	Roeselare	6	2	2	2	8	7	+1	25		2–2	—	0–1	4–0
3	Lommel	6	2	1	3	5	5	0	23		0–2	0–1	—	3–0
4	Tubize (R)	6	1	2	3	3	12	−9	17	Relegation to the 2019–20 Belgian First Amateur Division	0–3	1–1	1–1	—

Source: Belgian First Division B (in French and Dutch)
Rules for classification: 1) Points; 2) Points without (possible) half points added due to rounding; 3) Position obtained in the 2018–19 Aggregate table 4) Matches won; 5) Goal difference; 6) Goals scored; 7) Away goals scored; 8) Away matches won; 9) Play-off
(R) Relegated

== Season statistics ==
=== Top scorers ===
As of completion of the regular season.

Rank	Player	Club	Goals
1	(Portugal) Leonardo Rocha	Lommel	16
2	(Belgium) Igor de Camargo	Mechelen	13
2	(France) Thomas Henry	OH Leuven (Note: Includes eleven goals scored for Tubize, before his transfer to OH Leuven.)	13
2	(France) Youssouf Niakaté	Union SG	13
2	(Belgium) Dante Vanzeir	Beerschot Wilrijk	13
6	(Cameroon) Marius Noubissi	Beerschot Wilrijk	12
7	(Comoros) Faïz Selemani	Union SG	9
8	(Sweden) Gustav Engvall	Mechelen	8
9	(Belgium) Jens Naessens	Westerlo	7
10	(South Africa) Kurt Abrahams	Westerlo	6
10	(France) Frédéric Duplus	OH Leuven	6
10	(Belgium) Roman Ferber	Union SG	6
10	(Belgium) Mathieu Maertens	OH Leuven	6
10	(South Africa) Percy Tau	Union SG	6
10	(Morocco) Tarik Tissoudali	Beerschot Wilrijk	6

5 goals (6 players)

- (Belgium) Jan Van den Bergh (Beerschot Wilrijk)
- (Belgium) Rob Schoofs (Mechelen)
- (Belgium) Nikola Storm (Mechelen)
- (Belgium) Joachim Van Damme (Mechelen)
- (England) Elliott Moore (OH Leuven)
- (Nigeria) Saviour Godwin (Roeselare)

4 goals (3 players)

- (Belgium) Laurens Vermijl (Lommel)
- (Belgium) Thibaut Van Acker (Roeselare)
- (Belgium) Lukas Van Eenoo (Westerlo)

3 goals (16 players)

- (Austria) Erwin Hoffer (Beerschot Wilrijk)
- (Belgium) Sebastiaan Brebels (Lommel)
- (Belgium) Glenn Claes (Lommel)
- (France) Clément Tainmont (Mechelen)
- (Ivory Coast) William Togui (Mechelen)
- (Belgium) Joeri Dequevy (OH Leuven)
- (Poland) Bartosz Kapustka (OH Leuven)
- (Belgium) Derrick Tshimanga (OH Leuven)
- (Belgium) Mohammed Aoulad (Roeselare)
- (Brazil) Andrei Camargo (Roeselare)
- (Belgium) Esteban Casagolda (Roeselare) (Note: Includes one goal scored for OH Leuven, before his transfer to Roeselare.)
- (Slovenia) Nicolas Rajsel (Roeselare)
- (Ghana) Ernest Agyiri (Tubize)
- (Brazil) Pedro Henrique (Tubize)
- (France) Anthony Schuster (Tubize)
- (France) Thibault Peyre (Union SG)

2 goals (17 players)

- (Ukraine) Denis Prychynenko (Beerschot Wilrijk)
- (Belgium) Jorn Vancamp (Beerschot Wilrijk)
- (Belgium) Tom Van Hyfte (Beerschot Wilrijk)
- (Belgium) Glenn Neven (Lommel)
- (Belgium) Sam Valcke (Lommel)
- (Belgium) Mathieu Cornet (Mechelen)
- (Netherlands) Arjan Swinkels (Mechelen)
- (England) George Hirst (OH Leuven)
- (France) Samy Kehli (OH Leuven)
- (Belgium) Kjetil Borry (Roeselare)
- (France) Baptiste Schmisser (Roeselare)
- (Netherlands) Arsenio Valpoort (Roeselare)
- (France) Hugo Vidémont (Tubize)
- (Belgium) Pietro Perdichizzi (Union SG)
- (Ivory Coast) Ambroise Gboho (Westerlo)
- (Tunisia) Nader Ghandri (Westerlo)
- (Serbia) Sava Petrov (Westerlo)

1 goal (32 players)

- (France) Pierre Bourdin (Beerschot Wilrijk)
- (Belgium) Alexander Maes (Beerschot Wilrijk)
- (Togo) Euloge Placca Fessou (Beerschot Wilrijk)
- (Belgium) Robin Henkens (Lommel)
- (Belgium) Daan Heymans (Lommel)
- (Belgium) Seth De Witte (Mechelen)
- (Belgium) Onur Kaya (Mechelen)
- (Colombia) Germán Mera (Mechelen)
- (France) Yannick Aguemon (OH Leuven)
- (France) Julien Gorius (OH Leuven)
- (France) Redouane Kerrouche (OH Leuven)
- (Belgium) Jarno Libert (OH Leuven)
- (Belgium) Olivier Myny (OH Leuven)
- (Belgium) Koen Persoons (OH Leuven)
- (Belgium) Kenneth Schuermans (OH Leuven)
- (Belgium) Stijn De Smet (Roeselare)
- (Belgium) Guy Dufour (Roeselare)
- (Nigeria) Kingsley Madu (Roeselare)
- (Belgium) Emile Samyn (Roeselare)
- (Curaçao) Gino van Kessel (Roeselare)
- (Croatia) Dejan Čabraja (Tubize)
- (Belgium) Shean Garlito (Tubize)
- (Senegal) Lemouya Goudiaby (Tubize)
- (England) Aaron Nemane (Tubize)
- (Belgium) Marco Weymans (Tubize)
- (Belgium) Mathias Fixelles (Union SG)
- (Cameroon) Serge Tabekou (Union SG)
- (France) Fabien Antunes (Westerlo)
- (Belgium) Maxime Biset (Westerlo)
- (Belgium) Stephen Buyl (Westerlo)
- (Belgium) Nicolas Rommens (Westerlo)
- (Senegal) Noël Soumah (Westerlo)

1 own goal (8 players)

- (Belgium) Maxime Biset (Westerlo, scored for Mechelen)
- (Belgium) Gaëtan Coucke (Lommel, scored for Mechelen)
- (Belgium) Joren Dom (Beerschot Wilrijk, scored for Roeselare)
- (Rwanda) Salomon Nirisarike (Tubize, scored for Mechelen)
- (Belgium) Pietro Perdichizzi (Union SG, scored for Tubize)
- (France) Baptiste Schmisser (Roeselare, scored for Mechelen)
- (Senegal) Noël Soumah (Westerlo, scored for Mechelen)
- (Belgium) Jorn Vancamp (Beerschot Wilrijk, scored for Lommel)

=== Team of the season ===
Upon completion of the regular season a team of the season award was compiled, based upon the results of the team of the week results throughout the season, constructed based on nominations from managers, assistant-managers, journalists and analysts. The results were announced from 22 March 2019, with one player revealed each day.

Position		Player	Club	Reference
GK	(Belgium)	Théo Defourny	Tubize	
RB	(Argentina)	Federico Vega	Union SG	
CB	(France)	Thibault Peyre	Union SG & Mechelen	
CB	(Belgium)	Jan Van den Bergh	Beerschot Wilrijk	
LB	(Belgium)	Derrick Tshimanga	OH Leuven	
MF	(Belgium)	Onur Kaya	Mechelen	
MF	(Belgium)	Lukas Van Eenoo	Westerlo	
MF	(Belgium)	Robin Henkens	Lommel	
LW	(Belgium)	Nikola Storm	Mechelen	
RW	(South Africa)	Percy Tau	Union SG	
FW	(Belgium)	Igor de Camargo	Mechelen	

== Number of teams by provinces ==
Number of teams	Province or region	Team(s)
3	Antwerp	Beerschot Wilrijk, Mechelen and Westerlo
1	Brussels	Union SG
1	Flemish Brabant	OH Leuven
1	Limburg	Lommel
1	Walloon Brabant	Tubize
1	West Flanders	Roeselare

== Attendances ==
#	Club	Average
1	Mechelen	13,527
2	OHL	6,012
3	Beerschot	5,526
4	Westerlo	3,123
5	RUSG	2,878
6	Lommel	2,458
7	Roeselare	2,131
8	Tubize	1,519
