= Nick Gillekens =

Belgian footballer

Personal information
- Full name: Nick Jose Gillekens
- Date of birth: 5 July 1995 (age 31)
- Place of birth: Leuven, Belgium
- Height: 1.85 m (6 ft 1 in)
- Position: Goalkeeper

Team information
- Current team: Seraing
- Number: 1

Youth career
- 2001–2006: VK Rode
- 2006–2010: Tienen
- 2010–2014: OH Leuven

Senior career*
Years	Team	Apps	(Gls)
2014–2019	OH Leuven	58	(0)
2019–2022	Mouscron	19	(0)
2022–2025	Westerlo	12	(0)
2025–	Seraing	30	(0)
- * Club domestic league appearances and goals as of 20 April 2026

Nick Jose Gillekens (born 5 July 1995) is a Belgian professional footballer who plays as a goalkeeper for Challenger Pro League club Seraing.

== Career ==
Gillekens debuted for OH Leuven in the 2014–15 Belgian Cup in the sixth round match against Kortrijk, a 3–1 loss. However, that season he was part of the reserves and only fourth goalkeeper behind Logan Bailly, Yves Lenaerts and Senne Vits. Later that season he also played one match in the 2014–15 Belgian Second Division against Mons. Although Gillekens was promoted to third keeper for the 2015–16 season, he did not play a single match that season. Following the relegation from the 2015–16 Belgian Pro League, first goalkeeper Rudy Riou was released, while second goalkeeper Yves Lenaerts had already signed for ASV Geel.

As such, Gillekens was promoted to first goalkeeper for the 2016–17 season in the Belgian First Division B. During the winter 2017–18 transfer window OH Leuven signed Kawin Thamsatchanan, captain of the Thailand national football team and soon thereafter, Gillekens was demoted to reserve goalkeeper. Following Thamsatchanan's injury during the 2018–19 season, Gillekens again became the first goalkeeper for a few matches before being surpassed by Laurent Henkinet. Towards the end of the season, Gillekens was even demoted to third goalkeeper, with Thamsatchanan now taking his place on the bench. After the season's final match, it became clear that Gillekens would not be signing a new deal at OH Leuven.

After being a free-agent player for a few months, Gillekens was signed by Mouscron in the beginning of November 2019, as their first goalkeeper Jean Butez had suffered a long-term injury.

On 20 August 2025, Gillekens signed with Seraing for one season.

== Personal life ==
During his period at OH Leuven, Gillekens played together with his younger brother Jordy Gillekens. He later played against Jordy several times for Mouscron when Jordy represented Lierse.
