= Kawin Thamsatchanan =

Thai footballer (born 1990)

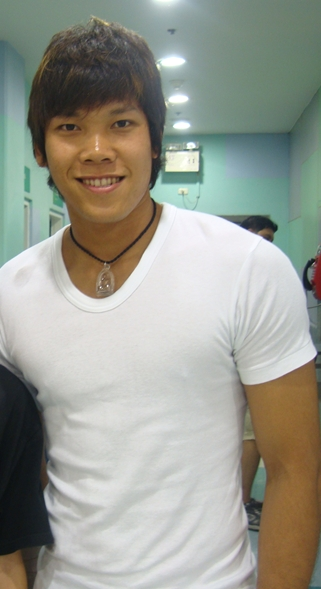
- Kawin in November 2010

Personal information
- Full name: Kawin Thamsatchanan
- Date of birth: 26 January 1990 (age 36)
- Place of birth: Bangkok, Thailand
- Height: 1.83 m (6 ft 0 in)
- Position: Goalkeeper

Team information
- Current team: Thailand (goalkeeping coach)

Youth career
- 2002–2007: Assumption College Thonburi

Senior career*
Years	Team	Apps	(Gls)
2007–2008	Rajpracha	16	(0)
2008–2018	Muangthong United	247	(0)
2018–2022	OH Leuven	12	(0)
2020	→ Hokkaido Consadole Sapporo (loan)	0	(0)
2022	→ Port (loan)	6	(0)
2022–2024	Muangthong United	13	(0)
Total		294	(0)

International career
2006–2007	Thailand U16	5	(0)
2008–2009	Thailand U19	11	(0)
2009–2014	Thailand U23	17	(0)
2022	Thailand U23 (wildcard)	6	(0)
2010–2022	Thailand	64	(0)

Managerial career
- 2025: Thailand U23 (goalkeeping coach)
- 2026–: Thailand (goalkeeping coach)
Medal record
Thailand under-23
Southeast Asian Games
Gold medal – first place	Sea Games 2013	Football
Silver medal – second place	Sea Games 2021	Football
Thailand
Asean Football Championship
Runner-up	AFF Suzuki Cup 2012	2012
Winner	AFF Suzuki Cup 2014	2014
Winner	AFF Suzuki Cup 2016	2016
Winner	AFF Suzuki Cup 2020	2020
- * Club domestic league appearances and goals

Kawin Thamsatchanan (Thai: กวินทร์ ธรรมสัจจานันท์, pronounced [kā.wīn tʰām.sàt.t͡ɕāː.nān]; born 26 January 1990) is a Thai retired professional footballer who plays as a goalkeeper.

== Club career ==
=== Rajpracha ===
Born in Bangkok, Kawin began his youth career in 2006 with Rajpracha, making his senior debut in 2007.

=== Muangthong United ===
In 2008, defending Thai division 2 champions Muangthong United signed Kawin at the age of 18. In his first season with Muangthong United, he secured his first-team status and helped the club win the division 1 title that season. After Muangthong's promotion to the Thai Premier League for the 2009–2010 season, Kawin led the team to win the top division title two years in a row, 2009 and 2010.

In October 2010, Bryan Robson, a Manchester United legend and Thailand's national team head coach at the time, spoke to United's goalkeeping coach, Eric Steele, suggesting he take a look at Kawin. However, Kawin broke his wrist, causing him to be out of action for months, ending his hopes of going on trial at Manchester United.

At the start of the 2013 season, while competing in the 2013 Lunar New Year Cup, Kawin collided against Chris Dickson. He suffered a broken shin, which kept him out for 7 months. After returning to the pitch in the second leg of the Thai Premier League, he dislocated his shoulder and tore ligaments in a match against TOT S.C., ending his season.

Kawin was named man of the match against Johor Darul Ta'zim in the second round of the 2016 AFC Champions League qualifying play-offs, saving all three of Johor's spot kicks in the penalty shoot-out.

=== OH Leuven ===
In 2018, Kawin completed his move to Europe by joining OH Leuven in the Belgian First Division B on a five-year contract. The deal was formally announced on January 10, 2018. Kawin, who wore the number 16 jersey, quickly became Leuven's first-choice goalkeeper, a position previously held by Nick Gillekens. After an outstanding performance in a 1-1 draw against Beerschot Wilrijk, Kawin was named in the Proximus League's Matchday 27 team of the week along with teammate Jarno Libert. In October 2018, Kawin suffered a foot injury which has kept him on the sidelines for months, allowing Laurent Henkinet to take up the position as first-choice goalkeeper. While Gillekens' contract was not prolonged after the 2018-19 season, OH Leuven signed international goalkeeper Darren Keet, who has since become the second choice goalkeeper behind Henkinet, bumping Thamsatchanan into third.

=== Hokkaido Consadole Sapporo ===
On 4 February 2020, it was announced that Kawin had joined club Hokkaido Consadole Sapporo on a season-long loan deal. He would eventually not play a single match for the team and returned to OH Leuven at the end of 2021.

=== Return to OH Leuven ===
Meanwhile at OH Leuven, the goalkeeper situation had changed completely: both Laurent Henkinet and Darren Keet had left the club and two new goalkeepers had been signed mid-2020: Rafael Romo and Daniel Iversen. With Iversen returning to Leicester City due to lack of playing time, only Romo and youngster Oregan Ravet remained and Kawin was soon reinstated as second-choice goalkeeper behind Romo. On 11 April 2021, in the penultimate game of the season against Cercle Brugge, Kawin was brought on as a replacement for an injured Romo at half-time, becoming the first Thai to play in the Belgian league. It would prove to be his only match that season, as Romo returned to play the final match of the season. During the 2021 summer transfer window, OH Leuven loaned Rúnar Alex Rúnarsson, demoting Kawin back to third-choice. He did not appear on the match sheet in any match during the first half of the 2021–22 season and being deemed surplus, he was allowed to play at the 2020 AFF Championship towards the end of 2021, a tournament which he played part of the first leg of the final. Subsequently, Kawin was loaned out on 4 January 2022, when it was announced that he had joined club Port on a loan deal.

=== Return Thai league with Port ===
Upon joining Port, Kawin was given the shirt number 1. In the 2021-22 Thai League 1, he played 7 appearances for the club.

=== Back to Muangthong United ===
On 9 August 2022, it was announced that Kawin has back joined club Muangthong United, along with wearing shirt number 26.

=== Retirement ===
On 17 June 2024, Kawin announced his retirement from 17 years of professional football. Kawin intends to quit playing football with the last team he was attached to, Muangthong United. Kawin played professional football, his last match in a game with Muangthong United versus BG Pathum United in 2024 Thai League Cup final on June 16, 2024.

== International career ==
Kawin had debut his first senior caps in 2010 King's Cup against Singapore at Nakhon Ratchasima province. Recently, under the management of Winfried Schafer, Kawin has been dropped to a substitution of Sintaweechai Hathairattanakool. He was the starting goalkeeper of the tournament in the 2012 AFF Suzuki Cup.

He represented Thailand U23 in the 2013 Southeast Asian Games. Kawin was the flag bearer for Thailand in the 2014 Asian Games, and was the captain of Thailand U23 in the tournament. Kawin was one of the overaged players playing in the 2014 Asian Games.

Kawin was part of Thailand's squad that won the 2014 AFF Suzuki Cup.

In December 2018, it was announced that Kawin would be part of the Thailand that would compete in the 2019 AFC Asian Cup. However, due to an injury, he sustained in October while playing for OH Leuven, Kawin was forced to withdraw just 2 weeks prior to the tournament. He came back in the drawn match against Vietnam.

== Personal life ==
A Buddhist, Kawin attended Assumption College Thonburi in high school and graduated from Assumption University with a bachelor in Business Administration. In September 2013, V. Vachiramethi, a famous Thai monk, advised him to add two Thai characters to his name, thus changing its spelling from กวิน to กวินทร์ (meaning "a great and powerful man") while retaining the pronunciation.

Kawin is good friends with former national team captain Panupong Wongsa and his idols are Oliver Kahn and Sinthaweechai Hathairattanakool.

== Honours ==
=== Club ===
Rajpracha

- Khǒr Royal Cup: 2007

Muangthong United

- Thai League 1: 2009, 2010, 2012, 2016
- Thai League 2: 2008
- Kor Royal Cup: 2010
- Thai League Cup: 2016

=== International ===
Thailand

- AFF Championship: 2014, 2016, 2020
- King's Cup: 2016, 2017

Thailand U-23

- Sea Games gold medal: 2013; silver medal: 2021

=== Individual ===
- ASEAN Football Federation Best XI: 2013
- AFF Championship Best XI: 2014
- AFF Championship All-time XI

== Royal decoration ==
- 2015 - Silver Medalist (Seventh Class) of The Most Admirable Order of the Direkgunabhorn
