= Sascha Kotysch =

German footballer

Personal information
- Date of birth: 2 October 1988 (age 38)
- Place of birth: Kirchheimbolanden, West Germany
- Height: 1.88 m (6 ft 2 in)
- Position: Defender

Youth career
- 2000–2006: 1. FC Kaiserslautern

Senior career*
Years	Team	Apps	(Gls)
2006–2010	1. FC Kaiserslautern II	22	(0)
2007–2010	1. FC Kaiserslautern	43	(0)
2010–2018	Sint-Truiden	178	(8)
2019–2021	OH Leuven	43	(4)
Total		286	(12)

International career
2007	Germany U19	1	(0)
2007–2008	Germany U20	4	(1)
- * Club domestic league appearances and goals

Sascha Kotysch (born 2 October 1988) is a German former professional footballer who played as a defender .

== Club career ==
Kotysch joined 1. FC Kaiserslautern in 2000 as a youth player having moved from regional team SV Gauersheim. In the 2006–07 season, he played for the reserve team of FCK. He made such a good impression in the second string that former manager Wolfgang Wolf gave him his first team debut. In his first season, he only played eight times for the first team but over time had a more important role to play and thus was rewarded with his first professional contract.

== International career ==
Kotysch is a youth international footballer for Germany.
