= Clément Fabre =

French footballer (born 1989)

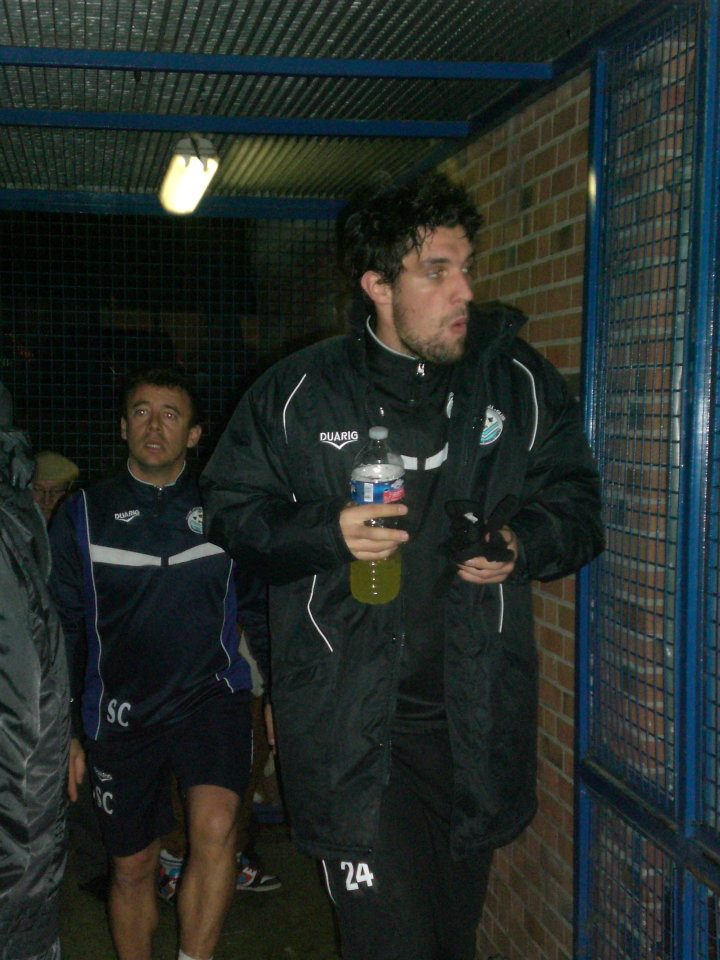

Personal information
- Date of birth: 19 May 1989 (age 37)
- Place of birth: Rodez, France
- Height: 1.90 m (6 ft 3 in)
- Position: Midfielder

Team information
- Current team: Blagnac
- Number: 5

Youth career
- 2006–2008: Grenoble

Senior career*
Years	Team	Apps	(Gls)
2008–2014	Tours	53	(0)
2014	→ Bastia (loan)	20	(0)
2014–2015	Bastia	19	(0)
2015–2017	Tubize	50	(5)
2017–2019	Oud-Heverlee Leuven	5	(0)
2019–2021	RWDM	28	(3)
2021–	Blagnac	1	(1)
- * Club domestic league appearances and goals as of 9 October 2021

Clément Fabre (born 19 May 1989) is a French professional footballer who plays as a midfielder for Blagnac.

== Professional career ==
A prospect from the Grenoble youth system, Fabre played for Tours for six years. He subsequently had stints with Bastia, and Tubize and Oud-Heverlee Leuven in Belgium.

In January 2019, he moved to RWDM.
