= Dico Jap Tjong =

Dutch footballer (born 1998)

Personal information
- Full name: Dico Chezarino Joey Jap Tjong
- Date of birth: 15 November 1998 (age 27)
- Place of birth: Amsterdam, Netherlands
- Height: 1.77 m (5 ft 10 in)
- Position: Midfielder

Team information
- Current team: TEC
- Number: 15

Youth career
- 2004–: De Dijk
- SV Diemen
- Swift
- –2010: DWS
- 2010–2012: Westerlo
- 2012–2013: Mechelen
- 2013–2014: OH Leuven
- 2014–2017: Genk

Senior career*
Years	Team	Apps	(Gls)
2017–2018	OH Leuven	0	(0)
2018–2020	Roda JC	3	(0)
2020–2021	Eindhoven	20	(2)
2023–2024	Kozakken Boys	28	(2)
2024	Koninklijke HFC	14	(0)
2025–	TEC	16	(4)
- * Club domestic league appearances and goals as of 15:49, 5 August 2025 (UTC)

Dico Chezarino Joey Jap Tjong (born 15 November 1998) is a Dutch footballer who plays as a midfielder for TEC.

== Club career ==
Jap Tjong made his Eerste Divisie debut for Roda JC Kerkrade on 14 October 2018 in a game against Go Ahead Eagles as an 85th-minute substitute for Nicky Souren.

In August 2020, Jap Tjong moved to FC Eindhoven.

Following a two-year hiatus without a club, Jap Tjong signed a one-year contract with Tweede Divisie club Kozakken Boys in July 2023. His connection with technical director Johan van der Werff was facilitated by his friend Kay Tejan, ultimately leading to the opportunity.

== Personal life ==
Born in the Netherlands, Jap Tjong is of Surinamese descent.
