= Frédéric Duplus =

French footballer (born 1990)

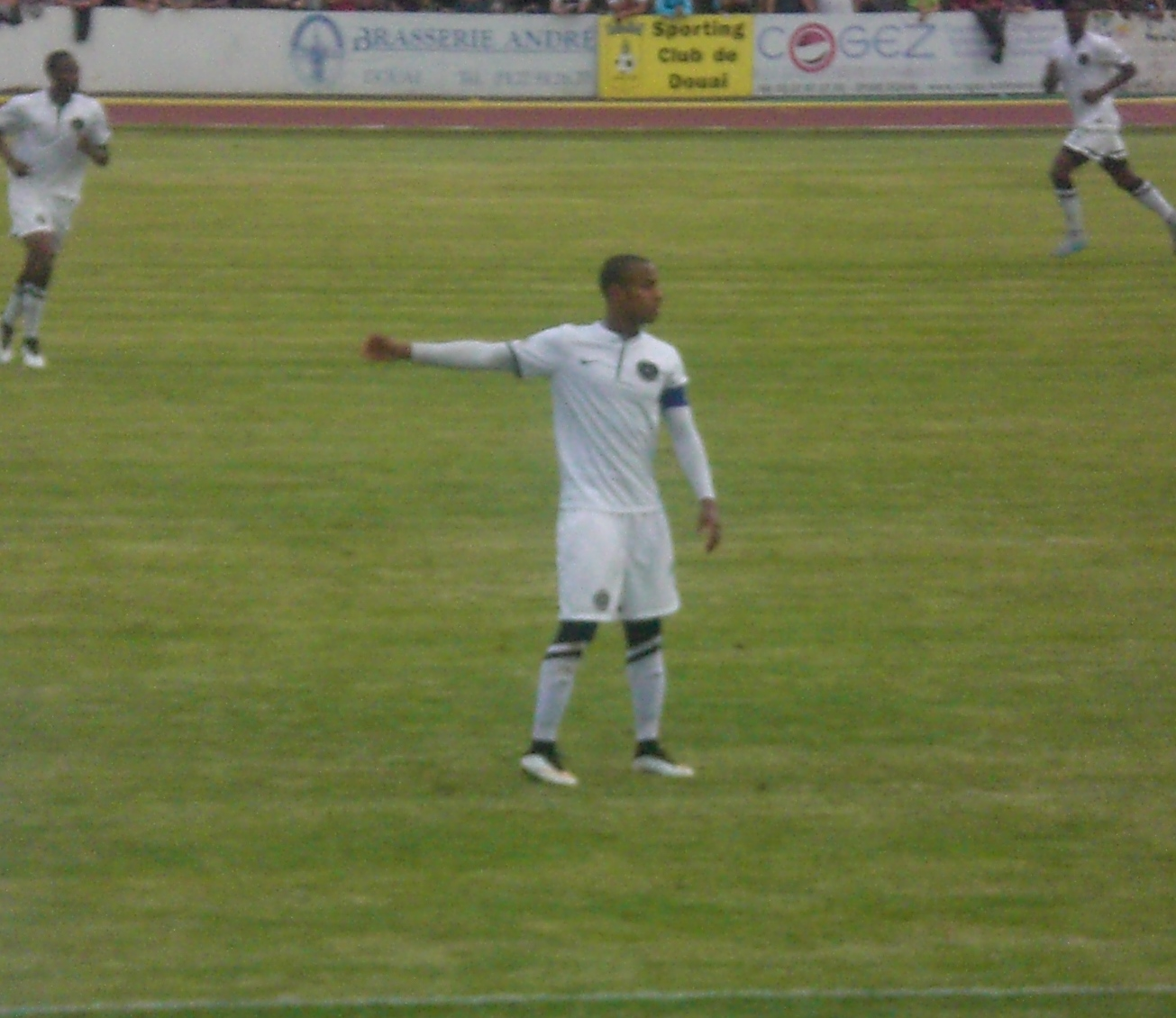

Personal information
- Date of birth: 7 April 1990 (age 36)
- Place of birth: Belfort, France
- Height: 1.78 m (5 ft 10 in)
- Position: Right-back

Youth career
- 1996–2002: SR Delle
- 2002–2008: Sochaux

Senior career*
Years	Team	Apps	(Gls)
2008–2013	Sochaux	11	(0)
2008–2013	Sochaux B	16	(0)
2011	→ Vannes (loan)	15	(1)
2011–2012	→ Guingamp (loan)	32	(1)
2013–2014	Zulte Waregem	13	(0)
2015–2016	White Star	43	(2)
2016–2017	Royal Antwerp	30	(1)
2017–2018	Lens	25	(1)
2018–2021	OH Leuven	66	(8)
2021–2022	Mouscron	21	(2)
2022–2023	SL16 FC	26	(0)

International career
2005–2006	France U16	16	(0)
2006–2007	France U17	11	(0)
2007–2008	France U18	9	(0)
2008–2009	France U19	5	(0)
2011	France U20	4	(1)
- * Club domestic league appearances and goals as of 15 June 2023

Frédéric Duplus (born 7 April 1990) is a French professional footballer who plays as a right-back.

== Football career ==
Duplus has been with the Doubs-based side since 2002. He was a part of Sochaux's youth squad that won the Coupe Gambardella in 2007. He made his highly anticipated professional debut in Sochaux's third round 1–0 win over Olympique Marseille in the 2008–09 edition of the Coupe de la Ligue coming on as a substitute playing 11 minutes. He made his league debut on 29 October 2008 against Olympique Lyonnais, however he was substituted out after only playing 32 minutes. It was discovered that Duplus had in fact tore ligaments in one of his knees ruling the youngster out of both league and international play for up to six months. He returned to Sochaux for the 2009–10 season and was assigned the first team number 2 shirt.

On 11 August 2021, he signed a two-year contract with Mouscron in Belgian First Division B.

== International career ==
Duplus was a member of the France squad that participated in the 2007 FIFA U-17 World Cup helping France reach the quarter-finals before being eliminated by Spain. He also played on the France U-19 team making his debut in the opening match of the 2008 Sendaï Cup.

== Career statistics ==
As of match played on 14 February 2020

Appearances and goals by club, season and competition
Club	Season	League			Cup		League Cup		Other		Total	
Club	Season	Division	Apps	Goals	Apps	Goals	Apps	Goals	Apps	Goals	Apps	Goals
Sochaux	2008–09	Ligue 1	1	0	0	0	—		—		1	0
Sochaux	2009–10	Ligue 1	10	0	1	0	1	0	—		12	0
Sochaux	Total		11	0	1	0	1	0	0	0	13	0
Sochaux B	2010–11	CFA	9	0	—						9	0
Sochaux B	2012–13	CFA	7	0	—						7	0
Sochaux B	Total		16	0	0	0	0	0	0	0	16	0
Vannes (loan)	2010–11	Ligue 2	15	1	0	0	—		—		15	1
Guingamp (loan)	2011–12	Ligue 2	32	1	0	0	—		—		32	1
Zulte Waregem	2013–14	Belgian Pro League	13	0	3	0	—		8	0	24	0
White Star Bruxelles	2014–15	Belgian Second Division	12	0	0	0	—		—		12	0
White Star Bruxelles	2015–16	Belgian Second Division	31	2	2	0	—		—		33	2
White Star Bruxelles	Total		43	2	2	0	0	0	0	0	45	2
Antwerp	2016–17	Belgian First Division B	23	0	1	0	—		2	0	26	0
Antwerp	2017–18	Belgian First Division A	5	1	0	0	—		—		5	1
Antwerp	Total		28	1	1	0	0	0	2	0	31	1
Lens	2017–18	Ligue 2	25	1	0	0	—		—		25	1
OH Leuven	2018–19	Belgian First Division B	26	6	0	0	—		6	1	32	7
OH Leuven	2019–20	Belgian First Division B	24	0	1	0	—		—		25	0
OH Leuven	2020–21	Belgian First Division A	0	0	0	0	—		—		0	0
OH Leuven	Total		50	6	1	0	0	0	6	1	57	7
Career totals			233	12	8	0	1	0	16	1	258	13
