= Samy Kehli =

French professional footballer (born 1991)

Personal information
- Full name: Samy Kehli
- Date of birth: 27 January 1991 (age 35)
- Place of birth: Saint-Avold, France
- Height: 1.91 m (6 ft 3 in)
- Position: Attacking midfielder

Team information
- Current team: APM Metz

Youth career
- 2007–2010: Metz

Senior career*
| Years | Team | Apps | (Gls) |
| 2010–2016 | Metz | 37 | (2) |
| 2013–2014 | → Excelsior Virton (loan) | 19 | (7) |
| 2014–2015 | → Seraing (loan) | 31 | (12) |
| 2016–2017 | Roeselare | 33 | (8) |
| 2017–2018 | Lokeren | 16 | (1) |
| 2018 | → OH Leuven (loan) | 13 | (2) |
| 2018–2021 | OH Leuven | 35 | (2) |
| 2022–2023 | Racing FC | 12 | (0) |
| 2023– | APM Metz | 0 | (0) |
- * Club domestic league appearances and goals as of 26 June 2023

Samy Kehli (born 27 January 1991) is a French professional footballer who currently plays as a midfielder. He is currently playing for APM Metz in the Régional 1 Grand Est.

== Career ==
Kehli began his career in the reserve team at Metz, and made his debut in the Championnat de France amateur 2 in the 3–0 home win against Jarville on 9 May 2010. He entered play as a 60th-minute substitute for Mehdi Bousbaa and scored the team's final goal four minutes from time. He made a second substitute appearance three weeks later as Metz won 1–0 away at Pontarlier. He played several more matches for the reserve side during the first half of the 2010–11 campaign. On 29 January 2011 he made his debut for the senior team, coming on as a substitute for Yeni Ngbakoto in the 1–2 defeat away at Troyes. He was then handed his first professional start the following week in the 2–1 away win over Vannes. He went on to play in 11 Ligue 2 matches for Metz during the 2010–11 season, five of them as a substitute.

Kehli made his first appearance of the 2011–12 season in the opening-day defeat away at Tours on 27 July 2011. He played in a further seven league matches during the first five months of the campaign, including a starting place in the 1–0 home win over Reims.

== Personal life ==
Kehli is of Algerian descent.

== Career statistics ==
As of match played 1 June 2018

Appearances and goals by club, season and competition
| Club | Season | League | | | National Cup | | League Cup | | Other | | Total | |
| Club | Season | Division | Apps | Goals | Apps | Goals | Apps | Goals | Apps | Goals | Apps | Goals |
|---|---|---|---|---|---|---|---|---|---|---|---|---|
| Metz II | 2010–11 | CFA | 7 | 0 | — | | — | | — | | 7 | 0 |
| Metz II | 2011–12 | CFA | 16 | 1 | — | | — | | — | | 16 | 1 |
| Metz II | 2012–13 | CFA | 13 | 6 | — | | — | | — | | 13 | 6 |
| Metz II | 2013–14 | CFA 2 | 1 | 0 | — | | — | | — | | 1 | 0 |
| Metz II | 2015–16 | CFA 2 | 13 | 5 | — | | — | | — | | 13 | 5 |
| Metz II | Total | | 50 | 12 | — | | — | | — | | 50 | 12 |
| Metz | 2010–11 | Ligue 2 | 11 | 0 | 2 | 0 | 0 | 0 | — | | 13 | 0 |
| Metz | 2011–12 | Ligue 2 | 8 | 0 | 2 | 0 | 0 | 0 | — | | 10 | 0 |
| Metz | 2012–13 | National | 11 | 2 | 0 | 0 | 3 | 0 | — | | 14 | 2 |
| Metz | 2015–16 | Ligue 2 | 7 | 0 | 0 | 0 | 0 | 0 | — | | 7 | 0 |
| Metz | Total | | 37 | 2 | 4 | 0 | 3 | 0 | 0 | 0 | 44 | 2 |
| Excelsior Virton (loan) | 2013–14 | Second Division | 19 | 7 | 0 | 0 | — | | — | | 19 | 7 |
| Seraing (loan) | 2014–15 | Second Division | 31 | 12 | 1 | 0 | — | | — | | 32 | 12 |
| Roeselare | 2016–17 | First Division B | 26 | 6 | 1 | 0 | — | | 7 (Note: Appearances in the Europa League play-offs) | 2 | 34 | 8 |
| Lokeren | 2017–18 | First Division A | 16 | 1 | 2 | 0 | — | | — | | 18 | 1 |
| OH Leuven (loan) | 2017–18 | First Division B | 6 | 1 | 0 | 0 | — | | 7 (Note: Appearances in the Europa League play-offs) | 1 | 13 | 2 |
| OH Leuven | 2018–19 | First Division B | 0 | 0 | 0 | 0 | — | | 0 | 0 | 0 | 0 |
| OH Leuven | Total | | 13 | 2 | 0 | 0 | — | | 7 | 1 | 13 | 2 |
| Career total | | | 185 | 41 | 8 | 0 | 3 | 0 | 14 | 3 | 210 | 44 |
