= Jellert Van Landschoot =

Belgian footballer (born 1997)

Personal information
- Date of birth: 27 August 1997 (age 29)
- Place of birth: Maldegem, Belgium
- Height: 1.76 m (5 ft 9 in)
- Position: Midfielder

Team information
- Current team: Kortrijk
- Number: 18

Youth career
- –2004: FC Kleit Maldegem
- 2004–2017: Club Brugge

Senior career*
Years	Team	Apps	(Gls)
2017–2020	Club Brugge	0	(0)
2017–2018	→ Eindhoven (loan)	38	(3)
2018–2019	→ Oud-Heverlee Leuven (loan)	11	(0)
2019–2020	→ NEC (loan)	28	(4)
2020–2021	Lierse Kempenzonen	19	(1)
2021–2022	Helmond Sport	38	(13)
2022–2024	Deinze	73	(15)
2025	Patro Eisden Maasmechelen	10	(1)
2025–	Kortrijk	32	(13)

International career
2013–2014	Belgium U17	3	(0)
2014–2015	Belgium U18	3	(0)
2015–2016	Belgium U19	6	(0)
- * Club domestic league appearances and goals as of 19 April 2026

Jellert Van Landschoot (born 27 August 1997) is a Belgian professional footballer who plays for Kortrijk in the Challenger Pro League.

== Club career ==
Van Landschoot played youth football for Club Brugge, who sent him on loan to FC Eindhoven ahead of the 2017–18 season. He made his Eerste Divisie debut for on 18 August 2017 in a game against SC Telstar.

On 12 September 2020, it was announced that Van Landschoot had signed with Lierse Kempenzonen.

Van Landschoot signed a two-year contract with Helmond Sport in July 2021, after having played one season for Lierse Kempenzonen.

On 4 August 2022, Van Landschoot joined Deinze in the Belgian First Division B, signing a two-year deal with an option for an additional season.

On 9 January 2025 Van Landschoot joined Patro Eisden Maasmechelen.

On 25 June 2025, Van Landschoot signed a three-year contract with Kortrijk.
