= Jorn Vancamp =

Belgian footballer (born 1998)

Personal information
- Full name: Jorn Vancamp
- Date of birth: 28 October 1998 (age 28)
- Place of birth: Hoboken, Antwerp, Belgium
- Height: 1.86 m (6 ft 1 in)
- Positions: Forward; attacking midfielder

Team information
- Current team: Dessel Sport
- Number: 10

Youth career
- –2016: Anderlecht

Senior career*
Years	Team	Apps	(Gls)
2016–2018	Anderlecht	1	(0)
2017–2018	→ Roda JC (loan)	24	(4)
2018–2021	Beerschot	34	(2)
2020–2021	→ Eindhoven (loan)	5	(0)
2022	Ilves	3	(0)
2022	Ilves II	1	(0)
2022–2023	OH Leuven U23	21	(11)
2023–2024	RAAL La Louvière	34	(21)
2024–2025	Virton	18	(1)
2025–	Dessel Sport	13	(6)

International career
2013	Belgium U15	4	(1)
2013–2014	Belgium U16	12	(2)
2014–2015	Belgium U17	21	(4)
2016	Belgium U18	1	(0)
2016–2017	Belgium U19	8	(5)
- * Club domestic league appearances and goals as of 3 May 2026

Jorn Vancamp (born 28 October 1998) is a Belgian professional footballer who plays as a forward or an attacking midfielder for Dessel Sport.

== Club career ==
Vancamp joined Anderlecht's youth academy. He made his first team debut on 25 September 2016 against K.V.C. Westerlo replacing Nicolae Stanciu after 88 minutes. On 8 December 2016, Vancamp made his debut in the UEFA Europa League as a starter, he played in the group stage a match against Saint-Étienne, he was replaced by Łukasz Teodorczyk in the 60th minute of a 3–2 home defeat. In July 2017, Vancamp was signed by Eredivisie side Roda JC for the 2017–18 season. On 13 August, he made his debut for the club in Eredivisie in a 4–2 away defeat against PEC Zwolle playing the full match.

Vancamp joined Beerschot on a permanent deal after returning from his loan at Roda JC. He was sent on a one-season loan to Dutch second-tier Eerste Divisie club FC Eindhoven on 5 October 2020.

On 9 January 2022, Vancamp joined Ilves in Finland on a contract until July 2022, with an option to extend. In July, his contract was terminated due to his lack of maintaining a physical condition required for a professional athlete.

== Career statistics ==
As of 23 June 2024.

Appearances and goals by club, season and competition
Club	Season	League			National cup (Note: Includes KNVB Beker, Belgian Cup and Suomen Cup)		Continental		Other		Total	
Club	Season	Division	Apps	Goals	Apps	Goals	Apps	Goals	Apps	Goals	Apps	Goals
Anderlecht	2016–17	Belgian First Division A	1	0	0	0	1 (Note: Includes UEFA Europa League)	0	–		2	0
Roda JC (loan)	2017–18	Eredivisie	24	4	2	0	–		–		26	4
Beerschot	2018–19	Belgian First Division B	15	1	2	0	–		–		17	1
Beerschot	2019–20	Belgian First Division B	19	1	2	0	–		–		21	1
Beerschot	Total		34	2	4	0	0	0	0	0	38	2
Eindhoven (loan)	2020–21	Eerste Divisie	5	0	–		–		–		5	0
Ilves	2022	Veikkausliiga	3	0	1	1	–		2 (Note: Includes Finnish League Cup)	1	6	2
Ilves II	2022	Kakkonen	1	0	–		–		–		1	0
OH Leuven U23	2022–23	Belgian National Division 1	21	11	–		–		–		21	11
RAAL La Louvière	2023–24	Belgian National Division 1	34	21	3	0	–		–		37	21
Virton	2024–25	Belgian National Division 1 ACFF	1	0	0	0	–		–		1	0
Career total			124	38	10	1	1	0	2	1	137	40

== Honours ==
Anderlecht

- Belgian First Division A: 2016–17

Beerschot

- Belgian First Division B runner-up: 2018–19

RAAL La Louviere

- Belgian National Division 1: 2023–24
