= Schiervelde Stadion =

Football stadium in Roeselare, Belgium

Coordinates: 50°57′08″N 3°06′19″E

Stadion Schiervelde
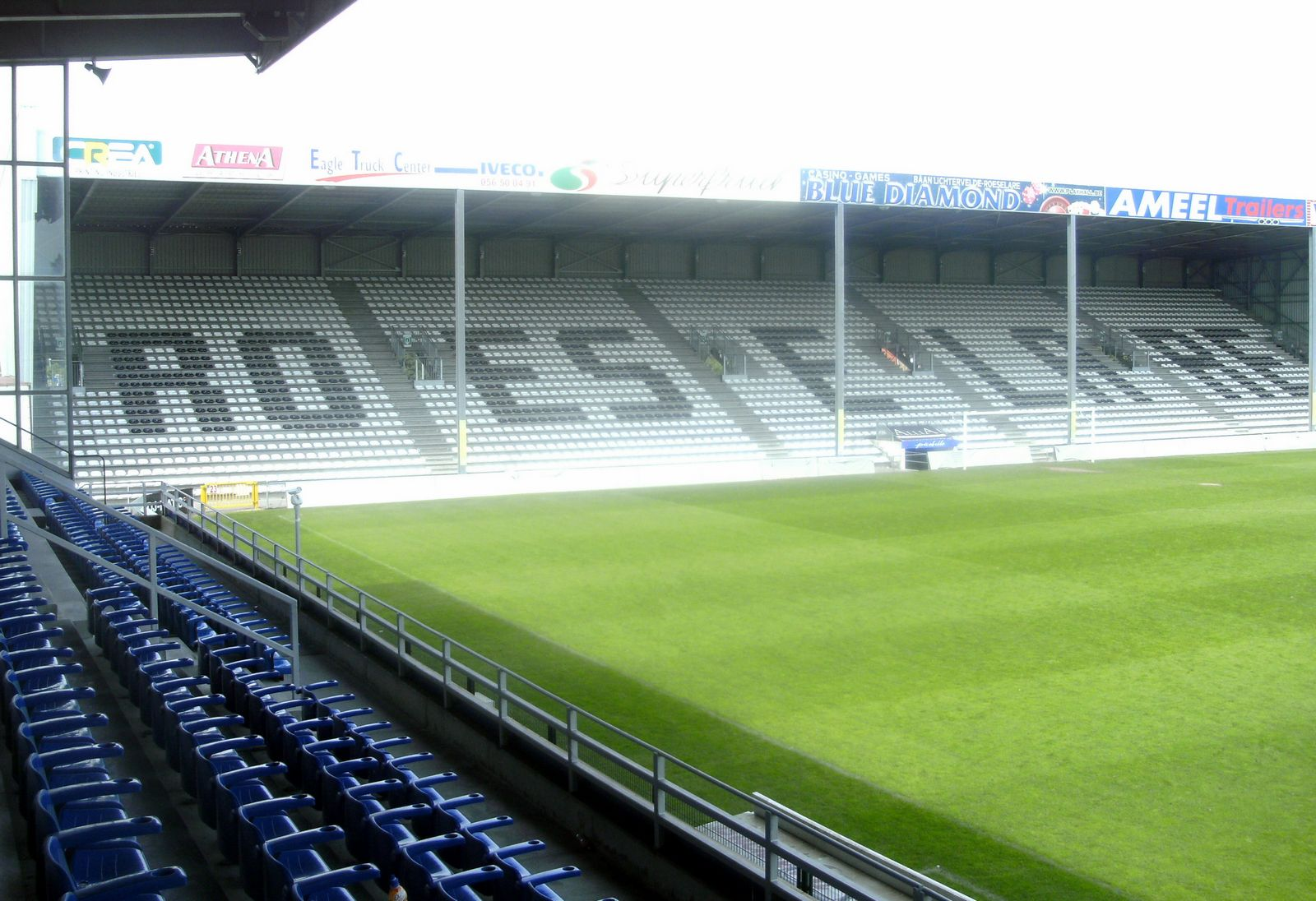
- Interactive map of Stadion Schiervelde
- Location: Roeselare, Belgium
- Capacity: 8,340 (limited capacity) / 9,461 (maximum)
- Surface: Grass

Construction
- Opened: 1987

Stadion Schiervelde (official name) (Dutch pronunciation: [ˈsxiːrvɛldə ˌstaːdijɔn]) is a multi-use stadium in Roeselare, Belgium. It was used mostly for football matches and was the home ground of K.S.V. Roeselare until 2020. The stadium has a capacity of 8,340.
