= Esteban Casagolda =

Belgian footballer

Personal information
- Full name: Esteban Casagolda Collazo
- Date of birth: 5 January 1987 (age 39)
- Place of birth: Brussels, Belgium
- Height: 1.88 m (6 ft 2 in)
- Position: Forward

Team information
- Current team: Saintoise

Senior career*
Years	Team	Apps	(Gls)
2006–2007	FC Brussels	4	(0)
2007–2008	Diegem Sport	20	(12)
2008–2010	Racing Mechelen	41	(19)
2010–2011	Motherwell	12	(0)
2011–2012	Beijing Baxy / Debrecen		
2012–2014	Union SG	61	(29)
2014–2016	Dender EH	59	(41)
2016–2019	OH Leuven	71	(19)
2019–2020	Roeselare	25	(9)
2021–2022	Dender EH	21	(11)
2022–2023	Lokeren-Temse	20	(10)
2023–2026	Crossing Schaerbeek	87	(51)
2026–	Saintoise	3	(1)
- * Club domestic league appearances and goals as of 8 June 2026

Esteban Casagolda Collazo (born 5 January 1987) is a Belgian professional footballer who plays as a forward for Saintoise in the Belgian Provincial Leagues.

== Club career ==
The striker has spent most of his career in Belgium, with FC Brussels, Diegem Sport, Racing Mechelen and Union Saint Gilloise. He was offered a trial at Stockport County. He was then offered a trial with Motherwell and, after impressing the Fir Park club, he was subsequently awarded a one-year deal. He then made his debut in a 3–2 defeat to Hibernian. He signed then on 22 July 2012 a one-year contract with Belgian lower league side Union St. Gilloise.

== Personal life ==
Casagolda was born in Belgium to a Spanish father and a Uruguayan mother.
