= Derrick Tshimanga =

Belgian footballer (born 1988)

Personal information
- Date of birth: 6 November 1988 (age 38)
- Place of birth: Kinshasa, Zaire
- Height: 1.76 m (5 ft 9 in)
- Position: Left back

Team information
- Current team: Beerschot
- Number: 26

Senior career*
| Years | Team | Apps | (Gls) |
| 2008–2011 | Lokeren | 55 | (6) |
| 2012–2016 | Genk | 112 | (1) |
| 2016–2017 | Willem II | 22 | (0) |
| 2017–2021 | OH Leuven | 94 | (5) |
| 2021–2023 | Beveren | 29 | (0) |
| 2023–2026 | Beerschot | 48 | (1) |

International career
| 2009 | Belgium U21 | 2 | (0) |
| 2011 | Belgium | 1 | (0) |
- * Club domestic league appearances and goals as of 19 April 2026

Derrick Tshimanga (born 6 November 1988) is a retired professional footballer who played as a left-back. Born Zaire, he has represented the Belgium national team.

== Career ==
=== Sporting Lokeren ===
In the 2008/09 season he made his debut in the First Division at Sporting Lokeren in the match against KV Mechelen, he came on after 82 minutes for Killian Overmeire . He eventually played 2 more matches that season. In the 2009/2010 season he scored his first goal at professional level in the match against VC Westerlo . He eventually played at Sporting Lokeren until the beginning of 2012 .

=== KRC Genk ===
On 9 January, KRC Genk announced that it had reached an agreement with Sporting Lokeren for the transfer of Tshimanga to Limburg. The national champions paid around 2.5 million euros in transfer fees. One day later, a local newspaper announced that the deal had also been concluded with the player himself and that Tshimanga only had to undergo medical tests. In his first half season with the club, he ultimately played 20 matches. In the following season, he played 28 matches for the club. He made his debut for the club in the match against SV Zulte Waregem. On 9 May 2013, he won his first prize with Genk. The Limburgers won the cup after a 0–2 victory against Cercle Brugge. Tshimanga played the entire final. In June 2016, his contract with Genk expired, after which he left the club on a free transfer.

=== OH Leuven ===
After playing one season for Willem II in the Netherlands, Tshimanga signed a contract with Oud-Heverlee Leuven from 14 July 2017 before the start of the 2017/18 season. He helped Leuven to promotion to the top flight in 2019–20, and after a two-year spell at freshly-relegated Beveren, moved to Beerschot in 2023, helping them to promotion in his first season at the club.

== Personal life ==
Katuku is born in Congo and emigrated to Belgium at a young age. He is the older brother of Holly Tshimanga, a youth international for Belgium.

== Honours ==
Genk

- Belgian Cup: 2012–13

OH Leuven

- First Division B/Challenger Pro League: 2019-20 promotion

Beerschot

- First Division B/Challenger Pro League: 2023-24
