= Redouane Kerrouche =

French footballer (born 1994)

Personal information
- Date of birth: 26 April 1994 (age 32)
- Place of birth: Noisy-le-Sec, France
- Height: 1.86 m (6 ft 1 in)
- Position: Midfielder

Team information
- Current team: Olympique Noisy-le-Sec

Youth career
- Seine-Saint-Denis
- CO Vincenne
- –2014: Drancy

Senior career*
Years	Team	Apps	(Gls)
2014–2015	Les Lilas		
2015–2017	Lusitanos Saint-Maur	50	(3)
2017–2018	Paris FC	37	(3)
2018–2019	OH Leuven	6	(1)
2019	Aves	0	(0)
2020	Le Puy B	1	(0)
2020	Le Puy	1	(0)
2020–2022	Dunkerque	53	(0)
2023–2024	Lusitanos Saint-Maur	1	(0)
2024–2026	Pays du Valois	0	(0)
2026–	Olympique Noisy-le-Sec	0	(0)
- * Club domestic league appearances and goals as of 21:16, 13 May 2022 (UTC)

Redouane Kerrouche (born 26 April 1994) is a French professional footballer who plays as a midfielder for Olympique Noisy-le-Sec.

== Career ==
Kerrouche played two season with Lusitanos Saint-Maur, helping win promotion into the Championnat National 2. He transferred to Paris FC on 23 June 2017. He made his professional debut with Paris FC in a 0–0 Ligue 2 tie with Clermont on 28 July 2017.

== Personal life ==
Kerrouche is the youngest of 7 siblings. He holds both French and Algerian nationalities.
