= Olivier Myny =

Belgian footballer

Personal information
- Full name: Olivier Gerrit Myny
- Date of birth: 10 November 1994 (age 32)
- Place of birth: Zwevegem, Belgium
- Height: 1.78 m (5 ft 10 in)
- Position: Right winger

Team information
- Current team: Gullegem

Senior career*
Years	Team	Apps	(Gls)
2014–2015	Roeselare	29	(11)
2015–2018	Waasland-Beveren	74	(8)
2018–2021	OH Leuven	41	(1)
2021–2022	Mouscron	23	(0)
2022–2024	Dender EH	44	(6)
2024–2025	Lokeren	8	(0)
2026–	Gullegem	0	(0)
- * Club domestic league appearances and goals as of 22 January 2026

Olivier Gerrit Myny (born 10 November 1994) is a Belgian professional footballer who plays as a winger for Gullegem.

== Career ==
In May 2018, Myny moved from Waasland-Beveren to OH Leuven. He had signed for 3 seasons.

== Investigation ==
In October 2018, Myny was interviewed as part of investigations following the 2017–2019 Belgian football fraud scandal. He was released by the investigating judge. In May 2019, Walter Mortelmans denied that he had tried to influence Myny to distort the match in Mechelen, which had been lost 2–0. His representative Jesse De Preter said a few days later that Myny had nothing to do with the match-fixing. Three player agents were found guilty of disregarding of competition regulations in June 2019. Myny was released. In July 2019, Myny's intermediary "Mortelmans" was banned for three years, two of which were deferred.
