= Shean Garlito =

Belgian footballer (born 1994)

Personal information
- Full name: Shean Garlito y Romo
- Date of birth: 19 February 1994 (age 32)
- Place of birth: Belgium
- Height: 1.85 m (6 ft 1 in)
- Position: Midfielder

Team information
- Current team: Tubize-Braine
- Number: 7

Senior career*
Years	Team	Apps	(Gls)
2012–2019	Tubize	155	(7)
2020	RWDM	7	(1)
2020–2021	Differdange 03	22	(0)
2022–	Tubize-Braine	121	(11)
- * Club domestic league appearances and goals as of 28 June 2026

Shean Garlito y Romo (born 19 February 1994) is a Belgian professional footballer who plays as a midfielder for Tubize-Braine.
