= Kenneth Schuermans =

Belgian footballer

Personal information
- Date of birth: 25 May 1991 (age 35)
- Place of birth: Genk, Belgium
- Height: 1.94 m (6 ft 4 in)
- Position: Centre back

Team information
- Current team: Termien

Youth career
- 1997–2000: Verbroedering Maasmechelen
- 2000–2005: Patro Eisden
- 2005–2008: Verbroedering Maasmechelen
- 2008: Excelsior Veldwezelt
- 2008–2011: Verbroedering Maasmechelen

Senior career*
Years	Team	Apps	(Gls)
2011–2017	Westerlo	134	(6)
2017–2021	OH Leuven	89	(5)
2021–2022	Lierse Kempenzonen	6	(4)
2022–2024	Deinze	58	(4)
2025–2026	Houtvenne	35	(4)
2026–	Termien	4	(0)
- * Club domestic league appearances and goals as of 3 May 2026

Kenneth Schuermans (born 25 May 1991) is a Belgian professional footballer who plays for Termien in the Belgian Division 2. He plays as a central defender. From 2009 to 2017 he played for Westerlo and before 2009 he played for seventh tier club Verbroedering Maasmechelen.

== Career ==
=== Verbroedering Maasmechelen ===
Schuermans started playing football at Verbroedering Maasmechelen, where he progressed through the youth teams and finally made the first team competing in the Belgian Provincial Leagues. During this period he briefly worked as a mail carrier. Eventually, professional club Westerlo discovered him and signed him to their youth team.

=== Westerlo ===
On 3 March 2012, Schuermans made his official debut for Westerlo against Lokeren, coming on as a half-time substitute for Evariste Ngolok in a 4–0 loss. He would eventually suffer relegation with Westerlo that season to the second division. From the 2012–13 season, he became a permanent starter in the second division for Westerlo. On 13 October 2012, he scored his first goal of his professional career against RWDM Brussels. In the 2013–14 season he won the second division title with Westerlo and thus promoted to the Belgian First Division A. Also in the 2014–15 season, he was a starter in defense.

=== Oud-Heverlee Leuven ===
On 19 May 2017, Schuermans signed with Oud-Heverlee Leuven after playing for Westerlo for 6 years. There, he immediately grew into a starter, and he occasionally managed to score as well, managing 5 goals in 89 appearances.

=== Lierse Kempenzonen ===
On 21 May 2021, he signed with Lierse Kempenzonen on a one-year contract. He made his debut on 13 August in a 1–1 away draw against Deinze. The following week, on 22 August, Schuermans scored a brace on two headers to secure a 2–0 win over Virton. He scored again the following week in a 2–3 loss to his former club Westerlo. On 12 September, he scored his fourth league goal in four matches as Lierse Kempenzonen beat RWDM 4–1.
