= Soevereinstadion =

Stadium in Belgium

- Aan de Gestelsedijk
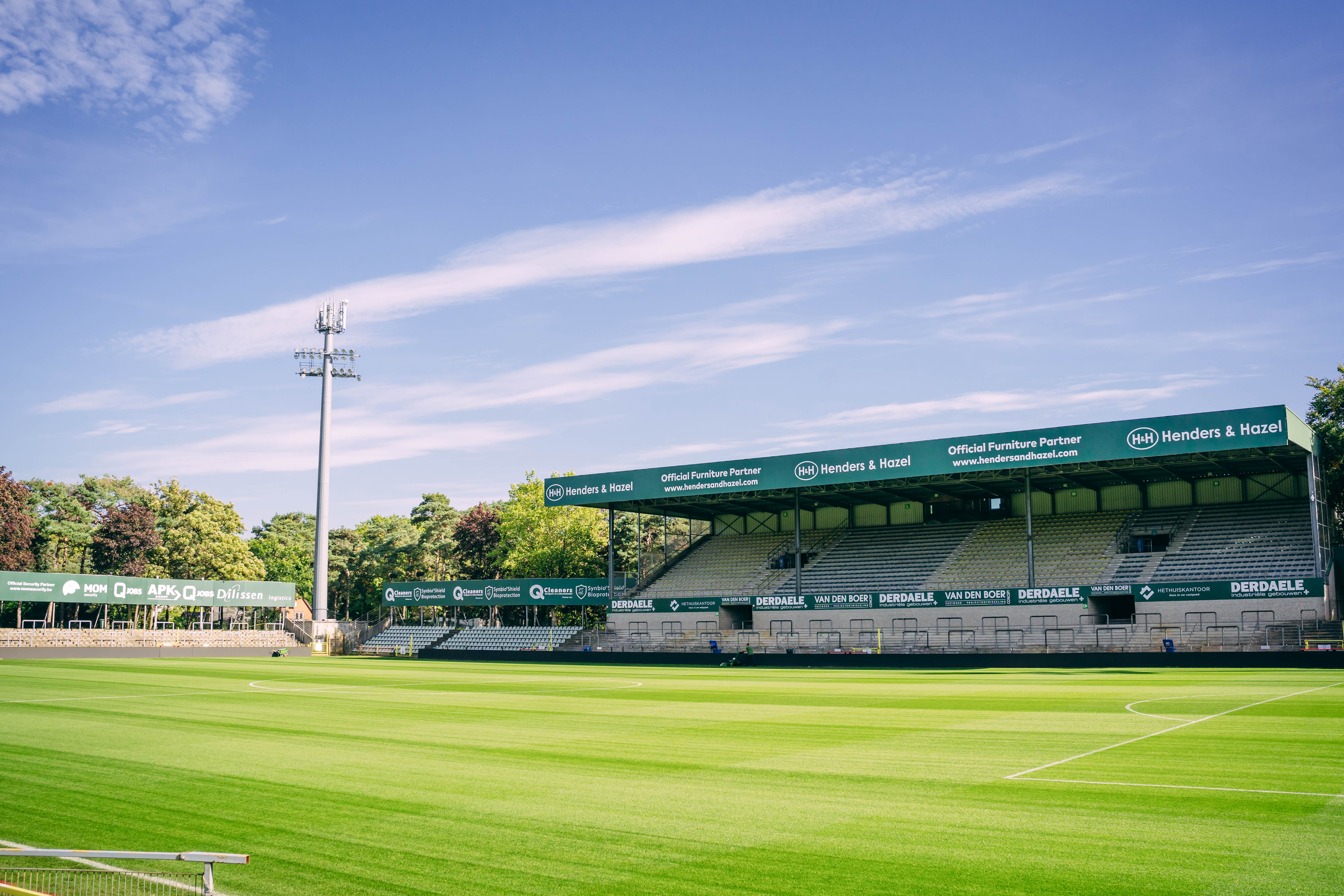
- Interactive map of Soevereinstadion
- Location: Lommel, Belgium
- Coordinates: 51°14′22″N 5°18′26″E
- Capacity: 8,000

Construction
- Built: 1992
- Renovated: 2015-2016, 2026

Tenant
- Lommel SK

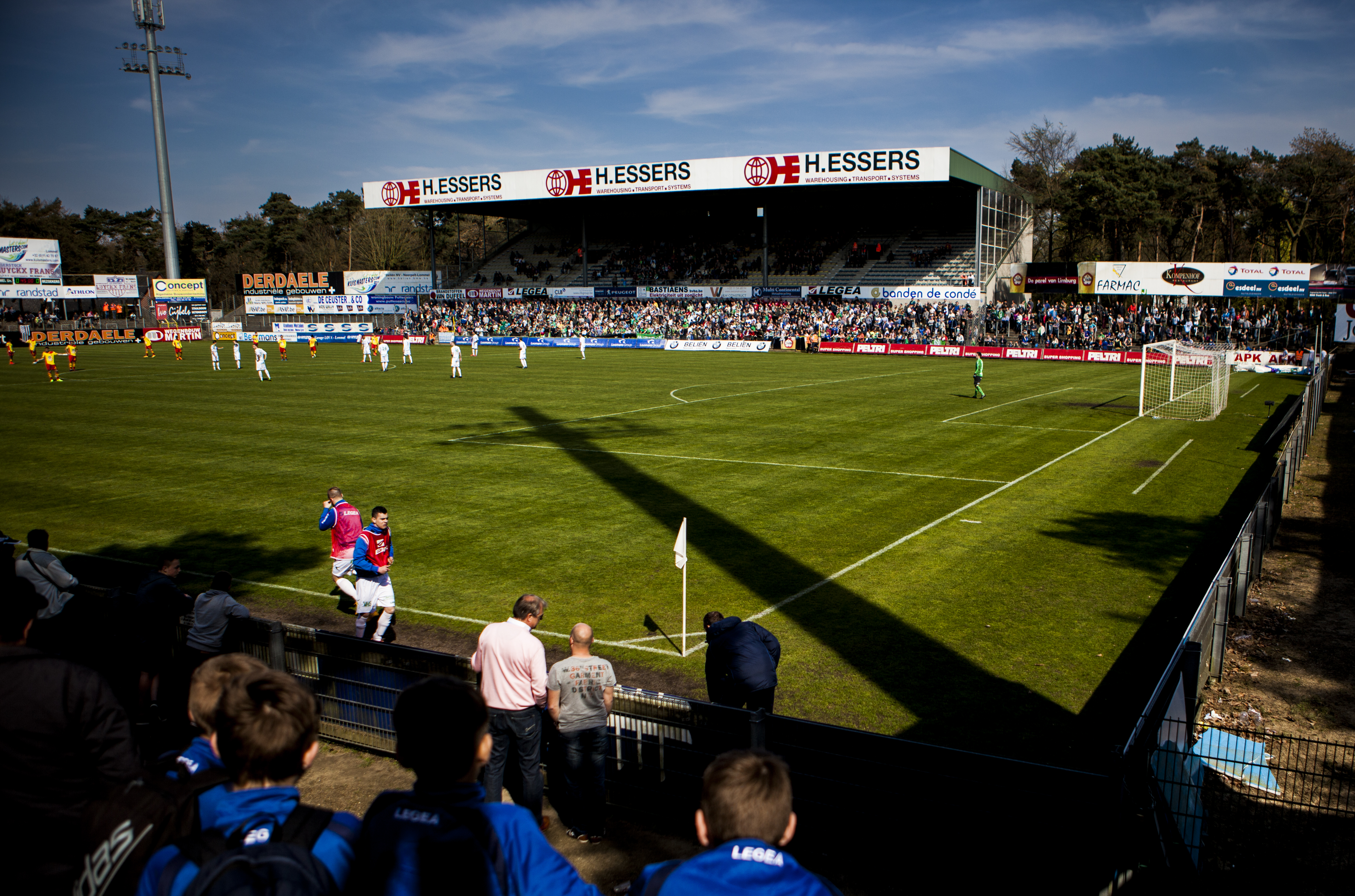
The Soevereinstadion in Lommel during a match in 2015.

Soevereinstadion (formerly called Stedelijk Sportstadion) is a football stadium in the Belgian city of Lommel. It is the home ground of Lommel SK. The former club KFC Lommel SK also played its home matches here until 2002.

== History ==
During the 2015–16 season, the stadium was adapted to meet the requirements for the Belgian First Division A. This followed the reform of Belgian football, in which the eight highest-ranked clubs that fulfilled the First Division A licensing conditions were given priority to participate in the renewed professional football system. Part of the standing terraces was replaced with seating. Before these renovations, the stadium had a capacity of 12,500 spectators, including 1,800 covered seats, 10,500 standing places, 433 outside seats, and 178 inside seats.

After the renovations, the stadium contained a total of 5,000 seats and 3,000 standing places.
