= Joeri Dequevy =

Belgian footballer

Personal information
- Date of birth: 27 April 1988 (age 38)
- Place of birth: Brussels, Belgium
- Height: 1.76 m (5 ft 9 in)
- Position: Winger

Team information
- Current team: Londerzeel

Youth career
- 1994–2006: Anderlecht
- 2006–2008: Roeselare

Senior career*
Years	Team	Apps	(Gls)
2007–2010	Roeselare	68	(6)
2010–2012	Lierse	33	(0)
2012–2015	Sint-Truiden	91	(27)
2015–2017	Antwerp	64	(8)
2018–2019	Oud-Heverlee Leuven	32	(3)
2019–2021	RWDM	30	(2)
2022–2023	Westerlo	0	(0)
2022–2023	→ Houtvenne (loan)	13	(4)
2023–2024	Houtvenne	2	(0)
2024	→ Londerzeel (loan)	0	(0)
2024–	Londerzeel	0	(0)

International career
2009–2010	Belgium U21	5	(1)
- * Club domestic league appearances and goals as of 2 September 2023

Joeri Dequevy (born 27 April 1988) is a Belgian footballer who plays as a winger for Londerzeel in the Belgian Division 3.

== Career ==
Dequevy started his professional career at K.S.V. Roeselare. He played 68 matches in the Belgian First Division scoring six goals.

For its First Division campaign, Lierse announced the signing of Dequevy on 27 June 2010. He signed a three-year contract. A move to Standard Liège fell through prior to his move to Lierse.

On 13 August 2012, Dequevy left Lierse for Belgian Second Division side Sint-Truiden.

In July 2015, Dequevy moved to Royal Antwerp in the Belgian Second Division for an undisclosed fee. He made 64 league appearances during his time there, scoring eight goals.

In January 2018, Dequevy moved to Oud-Heverlee Leuven. He made 32 league appearances for the club, scoring three goals.

In July 2019, it was announced that Dequevy had signed a two-year contract with RWDM with an option of an additional year. He made his debut for the club on 31 August in the starting lineup of a 0–2 home loss to Dender, before being substituted in the 72nd minute.
