= Mathieu Cornet =

Belgian footballer

Personal information
- Full name: Mathieu François Cornet
- Date of birth: 8 August 1990 (age 36)
- Place of birth: Namur, Belgium
- Height: 1.90 m (6 ft 3 in)
- Position: Forward

Team information
- Current team: Rochefort
- Number: 18

Youth career
- 1997–2004: RRC Mormont
- 2004–2006: Sprimont Comblain Sport
- 2006–2009: Standard Liège

Senior career*
Years	Team	Apps	(Gls)
2009	Germinal Beerschot	0	(0)
2010–2011	Tongeren	36	(4)
2011–2012	Givry	29	(13)
2012–2013	Huy	31	(14)
2013–2015	Virton	63	(22)
2015	Oostende	1	(0)
2016	Antwerp	13	(5)
2016–2018	KSV Roeselare	52	(13)
2018–2020	Mechelen	11	(2)
2019–2020	→ RWDM47 (loan)	14	(0)
2020–2021	Patro Eisden	0	(0)
2021–2022	Wiltz 71	29	(7)
2022–	Rochefort	64	(36)
- * Club domestic league appearances and goals as of 28 June 2026

Mathieu François Cornet (born 8 August 1990) is a Belgian professional footballer who plays as a forward for Rochefort.

== Club career ==
On 24 July 2018, Cornet joined Mechelen on a two-year deal after two years with KSV Roeselare.

On 13 August 2019, he joined RWDM47 on a season-long loan.

== Honours ==
Mechelen

- Belgian Cup: 2018–19
