= Stade Leburton =

Multi-use stadium in Tubize, Belgium

Coordinates: 50°41′02″N 4°12′02″E

Stade Edmond Leburton
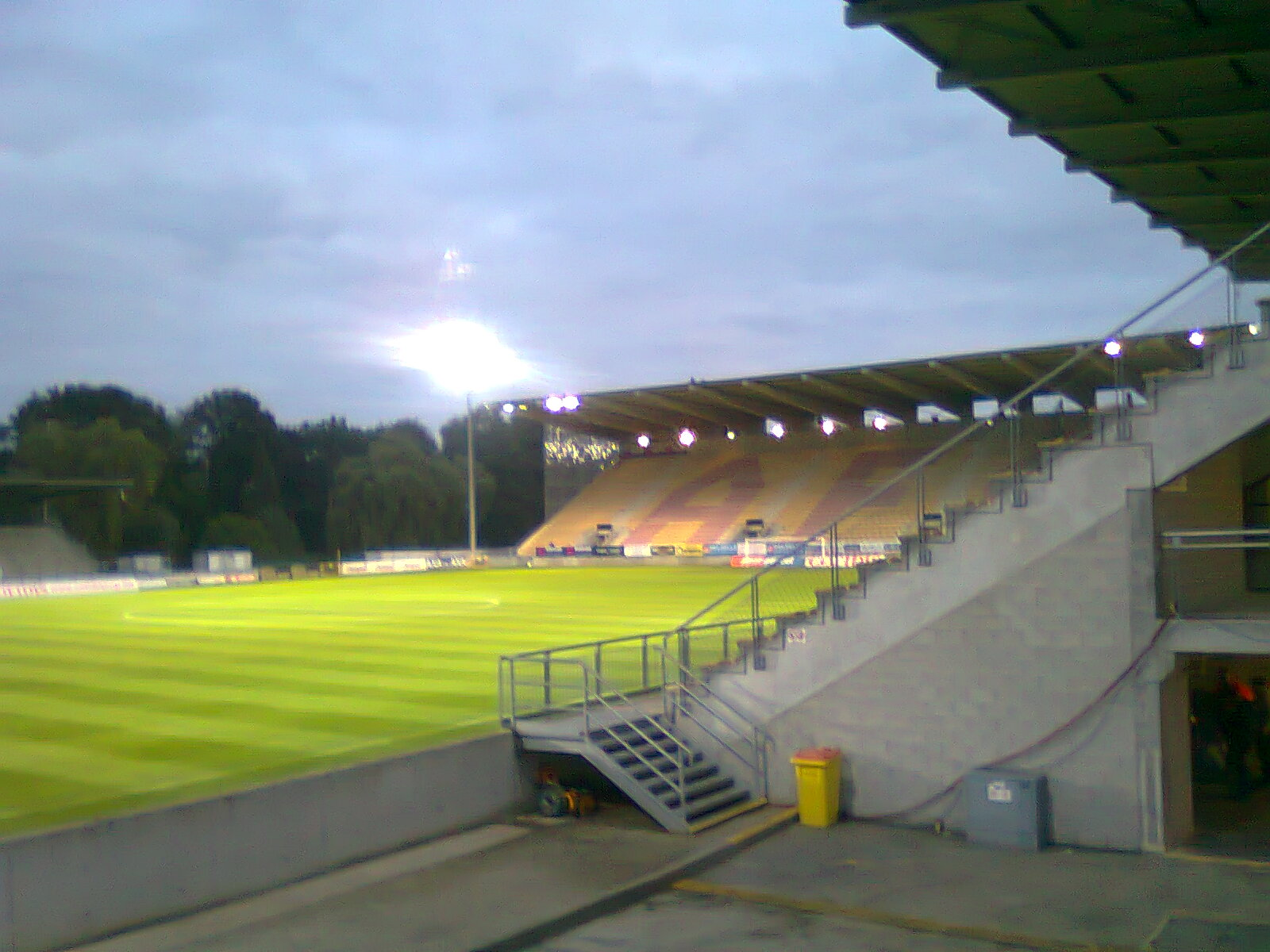
- Interactive map of Stade Edmond Leburton
- Location: Tubize, Belgium
- Owner: Tubize Municipality
- Operator: A.F.C. Tubize
- Capacity: 8,100
- Surface: grass

Tenant
- A.F.C. Tubize

The Stade Leburton is a multi-use stadium in Tubize, Belgium. It is currently used mostly for football matches and is the home ground of A.F.C. Tubize. The stadium holds 8,100 spectators.
