= Dejan Čabraja =

Croatian footballer

Personal information
- Full name: Dejan Čabraja
- Date of birth: 22 August 1993 (age 33)
- Place of birth: Zagreb, Croatia
- Height: 1.87 m (6 ft 2 in)
- Position: Forward

Youth career
- 2004–2009: Kustošija Zagreb
- 2009–2012: Dinamo Zagreb

Senior career*
Years	Team	Apps	(Gls)
2012–2013	Dinamo Zagreb	0	(0)
2012–2013	→ Sesvete (loan)	20	(2)
2013–2016	Lokomotiva	4	(1)
2014	→ Rudeš (loan)	10	(4)
2015	→ Rudeš (loan)	13	(4)
2015	→ Flamurtari Vlorë (loan)	0	(0)
2015–2016	→ Inter Zaprešić (loan)	7	(1)
2016	→ Lučko (loan)	6	(0)
2016–2017	Rudeš	10	(3)
2017–2018	Široki Brijeg	37	(10)
2019	Tubize	3	(1)
2019–2021	Rudeš	18	(3)

International career
2012	Croatia U19	1	(0)
2012–2013	Croatia U20	2	(0)
- * Club domestic league appearances and goals as of 20:01, 7 January 2020 (UTC)

Dejan Čabraja (born 22 August 1993) is a Croatian football player who most recently played as a forward for NK Rudeš.

== Honours ==
=== Club ===
Široki Brijeg

- Bosnian Cup: 2016–17
