= Lemouya Goudiaby =

Senegalese footballer

Personal information
- Date of birth: 9 January 1997 (age 29)
- Place of birth: Thiès, Senegal
- Height: 1.75 m (5 ft 9 in)
- Position: Midfielder

Team information
- Current team: Voltigeurs de Châteaubriant
- Number: 14

Youth career
- Génération Foot
- 2016–2017: Metz

Senior career*
Years	Team	Apps	(Gls)
2016–2018	Metz II	30	(0)
2017–2018	Metz	2	(0)
2018–2020	Tubize	26	(1)
2020–2022	Andrézieux-Bouthéon FC	28	(0)
2022–	Voltigeurs de Châteaubriant	55	(3)
- * Club domestic league appearances and goals as of 4 December 2025

Lemouya Goudiaby (born 9 January 1997) is a Senegalese professional footballer who plays as a midfielder for French club Voltigeurs de Châteaubriant.

== Career ==
Goudiaby joined FC Metz on 15 August 2016 from the Senegalese club Génération Foot. He signed his first professional contract with Metz on 11 August 2017 after playing 15 matches with the Metz reserves team. He made his professional debut for Metz in a 1–0 Coupe de la Ligue loss to Angers SCO on 12 December 2017.
