= Kurt Abrahams =

South African professional soccer player

Personal information
- Full name: Kurt Chad Abrahams
- Date of birth: 30 December 1996 (age 29)
- Place of birth: Cape Town, South Africa
- Height: 1.65 m (5 ft 5 in)
- Position: Forward

Team information
- Current team: Beveren
- Number: 34

Youth career
- Cape Town United

Senior career*
Years	Team	Apps	(Gls)
2017–2018	Sint-Truiden	14	(3)
2018–2021	Westerlo	101	(19)
2021–2022	Deinze	25	(1)
2023–2024	Novi Pazar	3	(0)
2024	→ Sloboda Užice (loan)	1	(0)
2024–	Beveren	40	(11)
- * Club domestic league appearances and goals as of 19 April 2026

Kurt Chad Abrahams (born 30 December 1996) is a South African professional soccer player who plays as a forward for Belgian club Beveren.

== Early life ==
Born in South Africa, Abrahams grew up in Lavender Hill in the Cape Flats of Cape Town.

== Club career ==
=== Sint-Truidense ===
Abrahams attended trials with several local clubs in the Cape Town region but were rejected as coaches believed he was too short. He attended a trial with Cape Town United after seeing an advert in a local newspaper at Wynberg Military Camp. The youth team was run by Colin Gie, a noted youth coach in the area, who worked with Abrahams for several years before arranging a trial with Belgian side Sint-Truidense VV when Abrahams was 18. Arriving in July 2015, the club extended the trial period before signing Abrahams on a three-year deal with a two-year extension option for the club.

After progressing through the club's youth system, Abrahams made his senior debut on 1 April 2017 as a substitute in place of Roman Bezus during a 1–0 victory over Waasland-Beveren in a UEFA Europa League playoff match. On 17 May, Abrahams scored his first senior goals after netting a hat-trick during a 7–0 victory over K.V. Mechelen. Having started the match as a substitute, he entered the game in the second half and scored all three goals in 8 minutes. His performances resulted in the club offering him a three-year contract extension. The following season, Abrahams' involvement in the first team was limited; he made only seven league appearances for the side.

=== Westerlo ===
In order to gain more first team experience, Abrahams signed for Belgian First Division B side Westerlo.

=== Deinze ===
On 17 July 2021, he joined Deinze on a two-year contract, also in the Belgian First Division B. Abrahams's contract with Deinze was terminated by mutual consent on 12 August 2022.

=== Novi Pazar ===
In summer 2023, Abrahams signed with Serbian SuperLiga side Novi Pazar. He was loaned to Serbian First League club Sloboda Užice in early 2024, but broke his leg on his debut.
