= Laurent Henkinet =

Belgian footballer

Personal information
- Date of birth: 14 September 1992 (age 34)
- Place of birth: Rocourt, Liège, Belgium
- Height: 1.89 m (6 ft 2 1/2 in)
- Position: Goalkeeper

Senior career*
Years	Team	Apps	(Gls)
2008–2010	Tongeren	6	(0)
2010–2011	Sint-Truiden	7	(0)
2011–2014	Standard Liège	0	(0)
2012–2013	→ Dessel Sport (loan)	14	(0)
2013–2014	→ Sint-Truiden (loan)	9	(0)
2014–2015	Kortrijk	18	(0)
2015–2016	Waasland-Beveren	22	(0)
2017–2020	OH Leuven	55	(0)
2020–2025	Standard Liège	14	(0)
- * Club domestic league appearances and goals

Laurent Henkinet (born 14 September 1992) is a Belgian former footballer who played as a goalkeeper.
