= Jarno Libert =

Belgian footballer

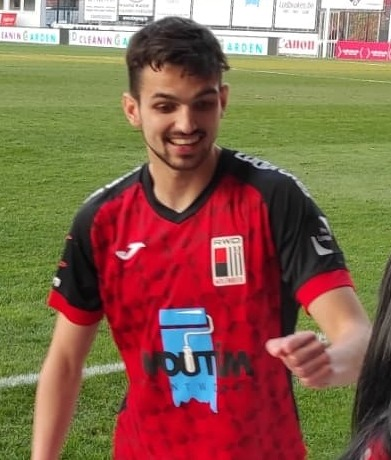
- Libert in 2022

Personal information
- Date of birth: 2 May 1997 (age 29)
- Place of birth: Liège, Belgium
- Height: 1.83 m (6 ft 0 in)
- Position: Centre-back

Team information
- Current team: Rochefort
- Number: 6

Youth career
- –2017: OH Leuven

Senior career*
Years	Team	Apps	(Gls)
2017–2019	OH Leuven	35	(2)
2019–2022	RWDM	67	(3)
2022–2024	Lierse	33	(1)
2024–	Rochefort	57	(2)
- * Club domestic league appearances and goals as of 28 June 2026

Jarno Libert (born 2 May 1997) is a Belgian footballer who plays as a centre back for Rochefort.

== Club career ==
Libert made his professional debut for OH Leuven on 12 August 2017 in the away match against Roeselare when he was subbed on for Jovan Kostovski. Libert scored the consolation goal on his debut as OH Leuven lost 3–1.
