= List of Belgian football transfers summer 2019 =

This is a list of Belgian football transfers for the 2019 summer transfer window. Only transfers involving a team from the professional divisions are listed, including the 16 teams in the Belgian First Division A and the 8 teams playing in the Belgian First Division B.

The summer transfer window will open on 1 July 2019, although several transfers will be announced prior to that date. Players without a club may join one at any time, either during or in between transfer windows. The transfer window ends on 2 September 2019, although a few completed transfers could still be announced a few days later.

== Sorted by date ==
=== January 2019 ===
Date	Name	Moving from	Moving to	Fee	Note
3 January 2019	Jan Van den Bergh	Beerschot Wilrijk	Gent	Free	
18 January 2019	Lior Refaelov	Club Brugge	Antwerp	Free	(Note: Refaelov was already on loan from Club Brugge to Antwerp during the 2018-19 season. The deal involved him signing for Antwerp permanently after the loan deal completed.)

=== February 2019 ===
Date	Name	Moving from	Moving to	Fee	Note
27 February 2019	Brian Vandenbussche	Cercle Brugge	Blankenberge	Free	

=== March 2019 ===
Date	Name	Moving from	Moving to	Fee	Note
15 March 2019	Luis García	Eupen	Free Agent	End of contract	
19 March 2019	Sulayman Marreh	Watford	Eupen	Undisclosed	(Note: Marreh was already on loan from Watford to Eupen during the 2018-19 season. Eupen activated a buy clause to make the move permanent.)
19 March 2019	Anton Saroka	Lokeren	BATE Borisov	Free	

=== April 2019 ===
Date	Name	Moving from	Moving to	Fee	Note
4 April 2019	Răzvan Marin	Standard Liège	Ajax	€12 500 000	
8 April 2019	Ryota Morioka	Anderlecht	Charleroi	€1 500 000	(Note: Morioka was already on loan from Anderlecht to Charleroi. The loan deal included a mandatory option to buy which was triggered due to Morioka starting his seventh game for Charleroi.)
29 April 2019	Jesse Bertrams	ASV Geel	Lommel	Undisclosed	

=== May 2019 ===
Date	Name	Moving from	Moving to	Fee	Note
1 May 2019	Luca Napoleone	Virton	RWDM47	Undisclosed	
2 May 2019	Stijn De Smet	Roeselare	Zwevezele	Free	
2 May 2019	Joep Hakkens	Genk	Lommel	Undisclosed	(Note: Hakkens was already on loan from Genk to Lommel during the second half of the 2018-19 season. All parties agreed to make the transfer permanent.)
5 May 2019	Kylian Hazard	Chelsea	Cercle Brugge	Undisclosed	(Note: Hazard was already on loan from Chelsea to Cercle Brugge during the 2018-19 season. All parties agreed to make the transfer permanent.)
6 May 2019	Obbi Oularé	Watford	Standard Liège	Undisclosed	(Note: Oularé was already on loan from Watford to Standard during the 2018-19 season. All parties agreed to make the transfer permanent.)
8 May 2019	Moussa Diallo	Eupen	RWDM47	Free	
8 May 2019	Odilon Kossounou	Hammarby	Club Brugge	Undisclosed	
9 May 2019	Aboubakar Keita	Copenhagen	OH Leuven	Undisclosed	(Note: Keita was already on loan from Copenhagen to OH Leuven during the second half of the 2018-19 season. All parties agreed to make the transfer permanent.)
10 May 2019	Jordy Peffer	Mechelen	Lyra-Lierse	Undisclosed	(Note: Peffer was already on loan from Mechelen to Lyra-Lierse during the 2018-19 season. All parties agreed to make the transfer permanent.)
13 May 2019	Selim Amallah	Excel Mouscron	Standard Liège	Undisclosed	
15 May 2019	Shun Ballegeer	Roeselare	Torhout	Free	
17 May 2019	Mbaye Leye	Excel Mouscron	Free Agent	Retiring	
19 May 2019	Vincent Kompany	Manchester City	Anderlecht	Free	
20 May 2019	Georgios Galitsios	Excel Mouscron	Anorthosis Famagusta	Undisclosed	
20 May 2019	Renato Neto	Gent	Oostende	Undisclosed	
23 May 2019	Jonas Bager	Randers	Union SG	Undisclosed	
24 May 2019	Geert Berben	Lommel	Patro Eisden Maasmechelen	Undisclosed	
24 May 2019	Dieter Creemers	Lommel	Patro Eisden Maasmechelen	Undisclosed	
24 May 2019	Sebastiaan De Wilde	Lommel	Free Agent	Released	
24 May 2019	Koen Persoons	OH Leuven	Knokke	Undisclosed	
27 May 2019	Lior Inbrum	Gent	Hapoel Tel Aviv	Loan	(Note: Inbrum was on loan from Gent to Beitar Jerusalem during the 2018-19 season, the loan ended and Inbrum was now loaned to Hapoel Tel Aviv.)
27 May 2019	Mërgim Vojvoda	Excel Mouscron	Standard Liège	Undisclosed	
28 May 2019	Mathieu Troonbeeckx	Heist	Sint-Truiden	Undisclosed	
29 May 2019	Jakub Brabec	Genk	Viktoria Plzeň	Undisclosed	(Note: Brabec was already on loan from Genk to Viktoria Plzeň during the second half of the 2018-19 season, with the latter club now activating the clause to make the deal permanent.)
29 May 2019	Merveille Goblet	Free Agent	Cercle Brugge	NA	
31 May 2019	Marwane Benamra	Mondorf-les-Bains	Virton	Undisclosed	
31 May 2019	Filip Bojic	Union Titus Pétange	Virton	Undisclosed	
31 May 2019	Kevin Malget	F91 Dudelange	Virton	Undisclosed	
31 May 2019	Victor Osimhen	VfL Wolfsburg	Charleroi	Undisclosed	(Note: Osimhen was already on loan from Wolfsburg to Charleroi during the 2018-19 season, the transfer was now made permanent.)
31 May 2019	Ari Freyr Skúlason	Lokeren	Oostende	Undisclosed	
31 May 2019	Anthony Swolfs	Gent	Telstar	Undisclosed	(Note: Swolfs was on loan from Gent to Waasland-Beveren during the 2018-19 season, the loan ended and Swolfs was sold to Telstar.)

=== June 2019 ===
Date	Name	Moving from	Moving to	Fee	Note
3 June 2019	Oscar Threlkeld	Waasland-Beveren	Salford City	Free	(Note: Threlkeld was on loan from Waasland-Beveren to Plymouth Argyle during second half of the 2018-19 season. The loan ended and Threlkeld was now released to Salford City.)
4 June 2019	Benjamin Delacourt	Cercle Brugge	RWDM47	Free	
5 June 2019	Jonathan Hendrickx	Breiðablik	Lommel	Undisclosed	
5 June 2019	Aboubakary Kanté	Béziers	Cercle Brugge	Undisclosed	
6 June 2019	Clément Petit	Excel Mouscron	Tournai	Free	(Note: Petit was on loan from Excel Mouscron to Francs Borains during the 2018-19 season. The loan ended and Petit was released to Tournai.)
6 June 2019	Julian Schauerte	Eupen	Preußen Münster	Free	
6 June 2019	Lindon Selahi	Standard Liège	Twente	Free	
7 June 2019	Alessandro Cordaro	Virton	Swift Hesperange	Undisclosed	
10 June 2019	Carlinhos	Standard Liège	Vitória de Setúbal	Loan	(Note: Carlinhos was on loan from Standard Liège to Guarani during second half of the 2018-19 season. The loan ended and Carlinhos was now loaned to Vitória.)
10 June 2019	Diawandou Diagne	Eupen	Delhi Dynamos	Free	
10 June 2019	Benjamin Schmit	Virton	RFC Liège	Undisclosed	
11 June 2019	Saulo Decarli	Club Brugge	VfL Bochum	Undisclosed	
11 June 2019	Samir Hadji	Fola Esch	Virton	Undisclosed	
12 June 2019	Hannes Smolders	Mechelen	Lierse Kempenzonen	Undisclosed	(Note: Smolders was already on loan from Mechelen to Lierse Kempenzonen during second half of the 2018-19 season, all parties now agreed to make the deal permanent.)
13 June 2019	Théo Bongonda	Zulte Waregem	Genk	Undisclosed	
13 June 2019	Moussa Djenepo	Standard Liège	Southampton	Undisclosed	
13 June 2019	Dimitri Oberlin	Basel	Zulte Waregem	Loan	
13 June 2019	Sam Valcke	Lommel	Dender EH	Undisclosed	
13 June 2019	Wesley	Club Brugge	Aston Villa	€25 000 000	
14 June 2019	Réda Halaïmia	MC Oran	Beerschot	Undisclosed	
14 June 2019	Corenthyn Lavie	Virton	F91 Dudelange	Undisclosed	(Note: Lavie was on loan from Virton to Hostert during the second half of the 2018-19 season, the loan ended and Lavie was now sold to F91 Dudelange.)
14 June 2019	Thibaut Lesquoy	Virton	F91 Dudelange	Undisclosed	
14 June 2019	Nando Nöstlinger	Antwerp	RKC Waalwijk	Undisclosed	
15 June 2019	Ibrahima Seck	Genk	Zulte Waregem	Undisclosed	(Note: Seck was already on loan from Genk to Zulte Waregem during the 2018-19 season, all parties now agreed to make the deal permanent.)
16 June 2019	Marcus Ingvartsen	Genk	Union Berlin	Undisclosed	
16 June 2019	Xavier Mercier	Cercle Brugge	OH Leuven	Undisclosed	
17 June 2019	Alessio Castro-Montes	Eupen	Gent	Undisclosed	
17 June 2019	Birger Verstraete	Gent	1. FC Köln	Undisclosed	
17 June 2019	Reuben Yem	Trenčín	Gent	Undisclosed	
18 June 2019	Glenn Claes	Mechelen	Virton	Undisclosed	(Note: Claes was on loan from Mechelen to Lommel during the 2018-19 season. The loan ended and Claes was now sold to Virton)
18 June 2019	Ronald Vargas	Newcastle Jets	Oostende	Undisclosed	
19 June 2019	Brent Gabriël	Club Brugge	Waasland-Beveren	Undisclosed	
19 June 2019	Raphael Holzhauser	Grasshoppers Zürich	Beerschot	Free	
19 June 2019	Maximilian Jansen	SV Sandhausen	Virton	Undisclosed	
20 June 2019	Valentin Baume	Charleroi	RWDM47	Loan	
20 June 2019	Issa Marega	Cercle Brugge	Châteauroux	Undisclosed	
20 June 2019	Benjamin Nygren	Göteborg	Genk	Undisclosed	
21 June 2019	Dennis Appiah	Anderlecht	Nantes	Undisclosed	
21 June 2019	Aleksandar Boljević	Waasland-Beveren	Standard Liège	Undisclosed	
21 June 2019	Paul Garita	Charleroi	Boulogne	Loan	(Note: Garita was on loan from Charleroi to Dunkerque during the 2018-19 season, the loan ended and Garita was now loaned to Boulogne.)
21 June 2019	Mikael Lustig	Celtic	Gent	Undisclosed	
21 June 2019	Elisha Owusu	Lyon	Gent	Undisclosed	
21 June 2019	Ognjen Vranješ	Anderlecht	AEK Athens	Loan	
21 June 2019	Dani Wilms	Beerschot	City Pirates	Undisclosed	(Note: Wilms was on loan from Beerschot to Rupel Boom during the 2018-19 season, the loan ended and Wilms was sold to City Pirates.)
22 June 2019	Darío Castro	Santa Fe	Standard Liège	Loan	
22 June 2019	Rik De Kuyffer	Club Brugge	Lommel	Undisclosed	
22 June 2019	Hicham Faik	Zulte Waregem	Heerenveen	Undisclosed	
22 June 2019	Cameron Humphreys	Manchester City	Zulte Waregem	Undisclosed	
22 June 2019	David Simão	Antwerp	AEK Athens	Undisclosed	
23 June 2019	Edisson Jordanov	F91 Dudelange	Virton	Undisclosed	
23 June 2019	Jovan Kostovski	OH Leuven	Ethnikos Achna	Free	
23 June 2019	Valeriy Luchkevych	Standard Liège	Oleksandriya	Undisclosed	(Note: Luchkevych was already on loan from Standard Liège to Oleksandriya during second half of the 2018-19 season, all parties now agreed to make the deal permanent.)
23 June 2019	Marko Mirić	Lokeren	Borac Banja Luka	Free	
23 June 2019	Dylan Saint-Louis	Paris FC	Beerschot	Free	
23 June 2019	Stélvio	F91 Dudelange	Virton	Undisclosed	
23 June 2019	David Turpel	F91 Dudelange	Virton	Undisclosed	
24 June 2019	Clément Couturier	F91 Dudelange	Virton	Undisclosed	
24 June 2019	Fazlı Kocabaş	Roeselare	Virton	Free	
24 June 2019	Marko Maletić	Roeselare	Paris FC	Undisclosed	(Note: Maletić was already on loan from Roeselare to Paris FC during the 2018-19 season, with Paris FC now activating the clause to make the deal permanent.)
24 June 2019	Jerry Prempeh	F91 Dudelange	Virton	Undisclosed	
24 June 2019	Yannick Schaus	Bayer Leverkusen	Virton	Undisclosed	
25 June 2019	Fabien Antunes	Sint-Truiden	Westerlo	Undisclosed	(Note: Antunes was already on loan from Sint-Truiden to Westerlo during the 2018-19 season, all parties now agreed to make the deal permanent.)
25 June 2019	Max Besuschkow	Union SG	Eintracht Frankfurt	Loan Return	(Note: Besuschkow was on loan from Eintracht Frankfurt to Union SG since the beginning of the 2018-19 season for two seasons, however the loan was terminated early and Besuschkow was loaned to SSV Jahn Regensburg instead.)
25 June 2019	Nicolas Gavory	Utrecht	Standard Liège	Undisclosed	
25 June 2019	Guillaume Hubert	Club Brugge	Cercle Brugge	Loan	
25 June 2019	Cédric Mateso	Westerlo	Heist	Loan	
25 June 2019	Miloš Stamenković	Union SG	Irtysh Pavlodar	Undisclosed	
25 June 2019	Yannick Verbist	Westerlo	Heist	Loan	
25 June 2019	Igor Vetokele	Charlton Athletic	Westerlo	Free	
26 June 2019	Jonah Osabutey	Werder Bremen II	Excel Mouscron	Loan	
26 June 2019	Tim Kips	1. FC Magdeburg	Virton	Undisclosed	
26 June 2019	Tim Kips	Virton	F91 Dudelange	Loan	
26 June 2019	Anthony Limbombe	Nantes	Standard Liège	Loan	
26 June 2019	Marko Bakić	Braga	Excel Mouscron	Undisclosed	(Note: Bakić was already on loan from Braga to Excel Mouscron during the 2018-19 season, all parties now agreed to make the deal permanent.)
26 June 2019	Anel Hajrić	Radomlje	Lokeren	Undisclosed	
26 June 2019	Leandro Trossard	Genk	Brighton & Hove Albion	Undisclosed	
27 June 2019	Sami Allagui	St. Pauli	Excel Mouscron	Undisclosed	
27 June 2019	Jimmy De Jonghe	Beerschot	Lokeren	Free	
27 June 2019	Kader Keita	Lille	Westerlo	Undisclosed	
27 June 2019	Charles Morren	Union SG	F91 Dudelange	Undisclosed	
27 June 2019	Ryan Sanusi	Grenoble	Beerschot	Free	
28 June 2019	Flavio Ciampichetti	Free Agent	Eupen	NA	
28 June 2019	Deni Hočko	Famalicão	Excel Mouscron	Undisclosed	
28 June 2019	Babacar Niasse	Eupen	Free Agent	Released	
28 June 2019	Stephen Odey	Zürich	Genk	Undisclosed	
28 June 2019	Junior Pius	Paços de Ferreira	Antwerp	Undisclosed	
28 June 2019	Zinho Vanheusden	Inter Milan	Standard Liège	Undisclosed	(Note: Vanheusden was already on loan from Inter Milan to Standard Liège during the 2018-19 season, all parties now agreed to make the deal permanent.)
29 June 2019	Ritchie De Laet	Aston Villa	Antwerp	Undisclosed	
29 June 2019	Thibault De Smet	Gent	Sint-Truiden	Undisclosed	
29 June 2019	Serge Gakpé	Cercle Brugge	Apollon Limassol	Undisclosed	
29 June 2019	Steven Lewerenz	1. FC Magdeburg	Virton	Undisclosed	
29 June 2019	Vanja Milinković-Savić	Torino	Standard Liège	Loan	
29 June 2019	William Owusu	Antwerp	Ajman	Free	
29 June 2019	Ante Palaversa	Manchester City	Oostende	Loan	
29 June 2019	Yan Vorogovskiy	Kairat	Beerschot	Undisclosed	
29 June 2019	Anass Zaroury	Zulte Waregem	Lommel	Undisclosed	

=== End of 2018–19 season ===
After the end of the 2018–19 season, several players will return from loan to another club or will not have their contracts extended. These will be listed here when the date is otherwise not specified.

Date	Name	Moving from	Moving to	Fee	Note
End of 2018–19 season	Abdul Jeleel Ajagun	Omonia	Kortrijk	Loan Return	
End of 2018–19 season	Alessio Alessandro	Westerlo	Free Agent	End of contract	
End of 2018–19 season	Nabil Alioui	Cercle Brugge	Monaco	Loan Return	
End of 2018–19 season	Gabriele Angella	Charleroi	Udinese	Loan Return	
End of 2018–19 season	Kévin Appin	Cercle Brugge	Monaco	Loan Return	
End of 2018–19 season	Anderson Arroyo	Gent	Liverpool	Loan Return	
End of 2018–19 season	Taiwo Awoniyi	Excel Mouscron	Liverpool	Loan Return	
End of 2018–19 season	Mamadou Bagayoko	Red Star	Mechelen	Loan Return	
End of 2018–19 season	Ibrahima Bah	RWDM47	Oostende	Loan Return	
End of 2018–19 season	Aliko Bala	Hapoel Marmorek	Zulte Waregem	Loan Return	
End of 2018–19 season	Simon Bammens	Westerlo	Tessenderlo	Free	(Note: Bammens was already on loan from Westerlo to Tessenderlo during the 2018-19 season. The loan and Bammens' contract with Westerlo ended, allowing him to move to Tessenderlo as a free agent.)
End of 2018–19 season	Emmanuel Banda	Béziers	Oostende	Loan Return	
End of 2018–19 season	Yannick Bolasie	Anderlecht	Everton	Loan Return	
End of 2018–19 season	Nils Bouekou	RWDM47	Union SG	Loan Return	
End of 2018–19 season	Benjamin Boulenger	Charleroi	Free Agent	End of contract	
End of 2018–19 season	Thomas Buffel	Zulte Waregem	Free Agent	Retired	
End of 2018–19 season	Irvin Cardona	Cercle Brugge	Monaco	Loan Return	
End of 2018–19 season	Pieter Caubergh	ASV Geel	Westerlo	Loan Return	
End of 2018–19 season	Charis Charisis	Kortrijk	PAOK	Loan Return	
End of 2018–19 season	Alexandru Chipciu	Sparta Prague	Anderlecht	Loan Return	
End of 2018–19 season	Duje Čop	Valladolid	Standard Liège	Loan Return	
End of 2018–19 season	Gaëtan Coucke	Lommel	Genk	Loan Return	
End of 2018–19 season	Glenn Daniëls	Lommel	Free Agent	End of contract	
End of 2018–19 season	Thomas De Bie	Oostende	Tubize	Free	
End of 2018–19 season	Laurens De Bock	Oostende	Leeds United	Loan Return	
End of 2018–19 season	Gertjan De Mets	Beerschot	Free Agent	Retired	(Note: De Mets was on loan from Zulte Waregem to Beerschot Wilrijk during the 2018-19 season. De Mets retired after the season.)
End of 2018–19 season	Leander Dendoncker	Anderlecht	Wolverhampton Wanderers	Undisclosed	(Note: Dendoncker was already on loan from Anderlecht to Wolverhampton Wanderers during the 2018-19 season. The deal included a clause making the transfer permanent after one season.)
End of 2018–19 season	Simon Diedhiou	OH Leuven	Free Agent	End of contract	
End of 2018–19 season	Landry Dimata	VfL Wolfsburg	Anderlecht	Undisclosed	(Note: Dimata was already on loan from Wolfsburg to Anderlecht. The loan deal included a mandatory option to buy which was triggered due to Dimata playing at least five game for Anderlecht.)
End of 2018–19 season	Salif Dramé	Virton	F91 Dudelange	Loan Return	
End of 2018–19 season	Soufiane El Banouhi	Lommel	Union SG	Loan Return	
End of 2018–19 season	Samuel Essende	Eupen	Paris Saint-Germain	Loan Return	
End of 2018–19 season	Yoann Etienne	Cercle Brugge	Monaco	Loan Return	
End of 2018–19 season	Mamadou Fall	Eupen	Charleroi	Loan Return	
End of 2018–19 season	Sidney Friede	Excel Mouscron	Hertha BSC	Loan Return	
End of 2018–19 season	Jentl Gaethofs	Lommel	Dessel Sport	Undisclosed	(Note: Gaethofs was already on loan from Lommel to Dessel Sport during second half of the 2018-19 season, the deal now became permanent.)
End of 2018–19 season	Nader Ghandri	Westerlo	Antwerp	Loan Return	
End of 2018–19 season	Jo Gilis	Eendracht Aalst	OH Leuven	Loan Return	
End of 2018–19 season	Jordy Gillekens	Fiorentina	OH Leuven	Loan Return	
End of 2018–19 season	Nick Gillekens	OH Leuven	Free Agent	End of contract	
End of 2018–19 season	Erik Gliha	Sint-Truiden	Free Agent	End of contract	
End of 2018–19 season	Julien Gorius	OH Leuven	Free Agent	End of contract	
End of 2018–19 season	Jeroen Goor	Westerlo	Wijgmaal	Free	(Note: Goor was already on loan from Westerlo to Wijgmaal during the 2018-19 season, the deal now became permanent.)
End of 2018–19 season	Danzell Gravenberch	Roeselare	Reading	Loan Return	
End of 2018–19 season	Alen Halilović	Standard Liège	Milan	Loan Return	
End of 2018–19 season	Sam Hendriks	Cambuur	OH Leuven	Loan Return	
End of 2018–19 season	Daan Heymans	Lommel	Waasland-Beveren	Loan Return	
End of 2018–19 season	Medjon Hoxha	Kortrijk	Free Agent	End of contract	
End of 2018–19 season	Jérémy Huyghebaert	Neuchâtel Xamax	Excel Mouscron	Loan Return	
End of 2018–19 season	Michiel Jaeken	Westerlo	Duffel	Undisclosed	(Note: Jaeken was on loan from Westerlo to Dessel Sport during the 2018-19 season. The loan ended and Jaeken was now sold to Duffel.)
End of 2018–19 season	Aurélien Joachim	Virton	Free Agent	End of contract	
End of 2018–19 season	Hervé Kage	Adana Demirspor	Kortrijk	Loan Return	
End of 2018–19 season	Daichi Kamada	Sint-Truiden	Eintracht Frankfurt	Loan Return	
End of 2018–19 season	Bartosz Kapustka	OH Leuven	Leicester City	Loan Return	
End of 2018–19 season	Cheick Keita	Eupen	Birmingham City	Loan Return	
End of 2018–19 season	Isaac Kiese Thelin	Bayer Leverkusen	Anderlecht	Loan Return	
End of 2018–19 season	François Kompany	Roeselare	Free Agent	End of contract	
End of 2018–19 season	Vladimir Kovačević	Sheriff Tiraspol	Kortrijk	Loan Return	
End of 2018–19 season	Yuya Kubo	1. FC Nürnberg	Gent	Loan Return	
End of 2018–19 season	Bennard Yao Kumordzi	Kortrijk	Free Agent	End of contract	
End of 2018–19 season	Paul Léonard	Virton	SAS Épinal	Undisclosed	(Note: Léonard was already on loan from Virton to SAS Épinal during the 2018-19 season. All parties agreed to make the transfer permanent.)
End of 2018–19 season	Maël Lépicier	Roeselare	Free Agent	End of contract	
End of 2018–19 season	Anderson López	Cercle Brugge	Monaco	Loan Return	
End of 2018–19 season	Deiver Machado	Atlético Nacional	Gent	Loan Return	
End of 2018–19 season	Parfait Mandanda	Dinamo București	Charleroi	Loan Return	
End of 2018–19 season	Carlos Martínez	Eupen	Guadalupe	Free	(Note: Martínez was on loan from Eupen to Herediano during the second half of the 2018-19 season. The loan ended and Martínez was released and moved to Guadalupe.)
End of 2018–19 season	Tim Matthys	Mechelen	Free Agent	Retired	
End of 2018–19 season	Ilombe Mboyo	Al-Raed	Kortrijk	Loan Return	
End of 2018–19 season	Eros Medaglia	Virton	Free Agent	End of contract	
End of 2018–19 season	Mohamed Messoudi	Beerschot	Free Agent	End of contract	
End of 2018–19 season	Martin Mimoun	Virton	Free Agent	End of contract	
End of 2018–19 season	Ryan Mmaee	Standard Liège	Free Agent	End of contract	(Note: Mmaee was on loan from Standard Liège to AGF during the 2018-19 season. The loan ended together with Mmaees contract at Standard Liège.)
End of 2018–19 season	Elliott Moore	OH Leuven	Leicester City	Loan Return	
End of 2018–19 season	Ahmed Mostafa	Smouha	Gent	Loan Return	
End of 2018–19 season	Youssef Msakni	Eupen	Al-Duhail	Loan Return	
End of 2018–19 season	Nihad Mujakić	Sarajevo	Kortrijk	Loan Return	
End of 2018–19 season	Rémi Mulumba	Eupen	Free Agent	End of contract	
End of 2018–19 season	Adrián Murcia	Virton	Free Agent	End of contract	
End of 2018–19 season	Knowledge Musona	Lokeren	Anderlecht	Loan Return	
End of 2018–19 season	Mohammad Naderi	Persepolis	Kortrijk	Loan Return	
End of 2018–19 season	Paul Nardi	Cercle Brugge	Monaco	Loan Return	
End of 2018–19 season	Pierre-Daniel N'Guinda	Cercle Brugge	Monaco	Loan Return	
End of 2018–19 season	Amin Nouri	Oostende	Vålerenga	Loan Return	
End of 2018–19 season	Rubin Okotie	Beerschot	Free Agent	End of contract	
End of 2018–19 season	Randal Oto'o	Westerlo	Free Agent	End of contract	
End of 2018–19 season	Joel Castro Pereira	Kortrijk	Manchester United	Loan Return	
End of 2018–19 season	Nicolas Rajsel	Roeselare	Oostende	Loan Return	
End of 2018–19 season	Romero Regales	Lommel	Free Agent	End of contract	
End of 2018–19 season	Ben Reichert	Ashdod	Zulte Waregem	Loan Return	
End of 2018–19 season	Davy Roef	Waasland-Beveren	Anderlecht	Loan Return	
End of 2018–19 season	Enes Sağlık	Tubize	Charleroi	Loan Return	
End of 2018–19 season	Idrisa Sambú	Excel Mouscron	Spartak Moscow	Loan Return	
End of 2018–19 season	Hady Sangaré	JMG Bamako	Standard Liège	Undisclosed	(Note: Sangaré was already on loan from JMG Bamako to Standard Liège during the 2018-19 season. The loan ended all parties agreed to make the transfer permanent.)
End of 2018–19 season	Takahiro Sekine	Sint-Truiden	FC Ingolstadt 04	Loan Return	
End of 2018–19 season	Darren Sidoel	Roeselare	Reading	Loan Return	
End of 2018–19 season	Alexander Sørloth	Gent	Crystal Palace	Loan Return	
End of 2018–19 season	Kamal Sowah	Leicester City	OH Leuven	Loan Extended	(Note: Sowah was already on loan from Leicester City to OH Leuven during the 2018-19 season. The loan was extended with another season.)
End of 2018–19 season	Bob Straetman	Virton	Lokeren	Loan Return	
End of 2018–19 season	Mamadou Sylla	Sint-Truiden	Gent	Loan Return	
End of 2018–19 season	Tesfaldet Tekie	Östersund	Gent	Loan Return	
End of 2018–19 season	Guévin Tormin	Cercle Brugge	Monaco	Loan Return	
End of 2018–19 season	Adama Traoré	Cercle Brugge	Monaco	Loan Return	
End of 2018–19 season	Gillian Vaesen	Westerlo	Hades	Undisclosed	(Note: Vaesen was on loan from Westerlo to Bocholt during the 2018-19 season. The loan ended and Vaesen was now sold to Hades.)
End of 2018–19 season	Thibaut Van Acker	Roeselare	Free Agent	End of contract	
End of 2018–19 season	Senne Van Dooren	Waasland-Beveren	Hoogstraten	Undisclosed	(Note: Van Dooren was already on loan from Waasland-Beveren to Hoogstraten during the 2018-19 season. The loan ended but all parties agreed to make the transfer permanent.)
End of 2018–19 season	Daan Vekemans	Eendracht Aalst	OH Leuven	Loan Return	
End of 2018–19 season	Apostolos Vellios	Waasland-Beveren	Nottingham Forest	Loan Return	
End of 2018–19 season	Louis Verstraete	Waasland-Beveren	Gent	Loan Return	
End of 2018–19 season	Ben Yagan	Roeselare	Free Agent	End of contract	
End of 2018–19 season	Adnan Zahirović	Virton	Free Agent	End of contract	

=== July 2019 ===
Date	Name	Moving from	Moving to	Fee	Note
1 July 2019	Loïc Badiashile	Monaco	Cercle Brugge	Loan	
1 July 2019	Giulian Biancone	Monaco	Cercle Brugge	Loan	
1 July 2019	Ricardo Ippel	MVV	Lommel	Undisclosed	
1 July 2019	Souleymane Kone	Djurgården	Westerlo	Undisclosed	
1 July 2019	Abou Ouattara	Mechelen	Lille II	Undisclosed	(Note: Ouattara was already on loan from Mechelen to Lille II during the second half of the 2018-19 season. The loan deal included an option to buy which Lille II chose to activate.)
1 July 2019	Daniel Schmidt	Vegalta Sendai	Sint-Truiden	Undisclosed	
2 July 2019	Bernardinho	Westerlo	Heist	Loan	(Note: Bernardinho was on loan from Westerlo to ASV Geel during the 2018-19 season. The loan ended and Bernardinho was now loaned to Heist.)
2 July 2019	Carlos Cuesta	Atlético Nacional	Genk	Undisclosed	
2 July 2019	Ilias Moutha-Sebtaoui	Anderlecht	Charleroi	Undisclosed	
2 July 2019	Ilias Moutha-Sebtaoui	Charleroi	F91 Dudelange	Loan	
2 July 2019	Nathan Rodes	Charleroi	Union Titus Pétange	Loan	
2 July 2019	Luka Zarandia	Arka Gdynia	Zulte Waregem	Undisclosed	
3 July 2019	Rocky Bushiri	Oostende	Norwich City	Undisclosed	(Note: Bushiri was on loan from Oostende to Eupen during the 2018-19 season, the loan ended and Bushiri was sold to Norwich.)
3 July 2019	Lamine Fall	Virton	Swift Hesperange	Undisclosed	
3 July 2019	Martin Hongla	Recreativo Granada	Antwerp	Undisclosed	
3 July 2019	Menno Koch	NAC Breda	Eupen	Undisclosed	
3 July 2019	Jelle Van Damme	Antwerp	Lokeren	Free	
4 July 2019	Andreas Beck	VfB Stuttgart	Eupen	Undisclosed	
4 July 2019	Sander Coopman	Oostende	Antwerp	Undisclosed	
4 July 2019	Boy de Jong	Anderlecht	Stellenbosch	Free	
4 July 2019	Tom De Sutter	Oostende	Knokke	Free	
4 July 2019	Guy Dufour	Roeselare	Dessel Sport	Free	
4 July 2019	Recep Gül	Galatasaray	Westerlo	Loan	
4 July 2019	Eduard Sobol	Shakhtar Donetsk	Club Brugge	Loan	
4 July 2019	Michel Vlap	Heerenveen	Anderlecht	Undisclosed	
5 July 2019	Jun Amano	Yokohama F. Marinos	Lokeren	Undisclosed	
5 July 2019	Nguyễn Công Phượng	Hoang Anh Gia Lai	Sint-Truiden	Loan	
5 July 2019	Bambo Diaby	Lokeren	Barnsley	Undisclosed	
5 July 2019	Silvère Ganvoula	Anderlecht	VfL Bochum	Undisclosed	(Note: Ganvoula was already on loan from Anderlecht to Bochum during the 2018-19 season, the loan ended but all parties agreed to make the transfer permanent.)
5 July 2019	George Hirst	OH Leuven	Leicester City	Undisclosed	
5 July 2019	Cyle Larin	Beşiktaş	Zulte Waregem	Loan	
5 July 2019	Riley McGree	Club Brugge	Adelaide United	Undisclosed	(Note: McGree was on loan from Club Brugge to Melbourne City during the 2018-19 season, the loan ended and McGree was sold to Adelaine United.)
5 July 2019	Robert Mühren	Zulte Waregem	Cambuur	Loan	(Note: Mühren was on loan from Zulte Waregem to NAC Breda during the 2018-19 season, the loan ended and Mühren was now loaned to Cambuur.)
5 July 2019	Samir Nasri	West Ham United	Anderlecht	Free	
5 July 2019	Casper Nielsen	OB	Union SG	Undisclosed	
5 July 2019	Idriss Saadi	Strasbourg	Cercle Brugge	Loan	
5 July 2019	Julien Serrano	Monaco	Cercle Brugge	Loan	
5 July 2019	Mario Tičinović	Lokeren	Zrinjski Mostar	Free	
6 July 2019	Stefano Denswil	Club Brugge	Bologna	Undisclosed	
6 July 2019	Nikos Kenourgios	Sparti	Zulte Waregem	Undisclosed	
6 July 2019	Francisco Martos	Charleroi	FC Andorra	Free	
6 July 2019	George Timotheou	Schalke 04	Zulte Waregem	Undisclosed	
7 July 2019	Jellert van Landschoot	Club Brugge	NEC	Loan	(Note: Van Landschoot was on loan from Club Brugge to OH Leuven during the 2018-19 season, the loan ended and van Landschoot was now loaned to NEC.)
8 July 2019	Christophe Diedhiou	Excel Mouscron	Sochaux	Free	
8 July 2019	Patrik Hrošovský	Viktoria Plzeň	Genk	Undisclosed	
8 July 2019	Amadou Sagna	Cayor Foot	Club Brugge	Undisclosed	
8 July 2019	Yaya Sané	Free Agent	Oostende	NA	
8 July 2019	Rubin Seigers	Genk	Beerschot	Loan	
9 July 2019	Alessandro Ciranni	Fortuna Sittard	Excel Mouscron	Undisclosed	
9 July 2019	Omar Govea	Porto B	Zulte Waregem	Undisclosed	(Note: Govea was on loan from Porto B to Antwerp during the 2018-19 season, the loan ended and Govea was now sold to Zulte Waregem.)
9 July 2019	Hamdi Harbaoui	Zulte Waregem	Al-Arabi	Undisclosed	
9 July 2019	Gökhan Kardeş	Beerschot	BB Erzurumspor	Undisclosed	(Note: Kardeş was on loan from Beerschot to Afjet Afyonspor during the second half of the 2018-19 season, the loan ended and Kardeş was now sold to BB Erzurumspor.)
9 July 2019	Germán Mera	Mechelen	Atlético Junior	Undisclosed	
9 July 2019	David Okereke	Spezia	Club Brugge	Undisclosed	
9 July 2019	Takehiro Tomiyasu	Sint-Truiden	Bologna	Undisclosed	
10 July 2019	Felipe Avenatti	Bologna	Standard Liège	Undisclosed	(Note: Avenatti was on loan from Bologna to Kortrijk during the 2018-19 season, the loan ended and Avenatti was now sold to Standard Liège.)
10 July 2019	Cristian Ceballos	Sint-Truiden	Free Agent	Contract Terminated	
10 July 2019	Simon Deli	Slavia Prague	Club Brugge	Undisclosed	
10 July 2019	Alexis De Sart	Sint-Truiden	Antwerp	Undisclosed	
10 July 2019	Benoît Poulain	Club Brugge	Kayserispor	Free	
10 July 2019	Siebe Van der Heyden	FC Eindhoven	Union SG	Undisclosed	
10 July 2019	Tom Van Hyfte	Beerschot	OH Leuven	Free	
11 July 2019	Joseph Aidoo	Genk	Celta Vigo	Undisclosed	
11 July 2019	Opoku Ampomah	Waasland-Beveren	Fortuna Düsseldorf	Undisclosed	
11 July 2019	Jon Bautista	Sociedad	Eupen	Loan	
11 July 2019	Jérôme Deom	Standard Liège	MVV	Undisclosed	(Note: Deom was already on loan from Standard Liège to MVV during the 2018-19 season. The loan ended but all parties came to an agreement to make the transfer permanent.)
11 July 2019	Xian Emmers	Inter Milan	Waasland-Beveren	Loan	
11 July 2019	Rominigue Kouamé	Lille	Cercle Brugge	Loan	
11 July 2019	Fran Navarro	Valencia Mestalla	Lokeren	Loan	
11 July 2019	Ivan Obradović	Anderlecht	Legia Warsaw	Free	
11 July 2019	Lucas Pirard	Sint-Truiden	Waasland-Beveren	Undisclosed	
11 July 2019	Isaiah Young	Werder Bremen II	Union SG	Loan	
12 July 2019	Hannes Delcroix	Anderlecht	RKC Waalwijk	Loan	
12 July 2019	Dorian Dervite	Charleroi	Doxa Katokopia	Undisclosed	(Note: Dervite was on loan from Charleroi to NAC Breda during the second half of the 2018-19 season, the loan ended and Dervite was now sold to Doxa Katokopia.)
12 July 2019	Florent Devresse	Virton	Swift Hesperange	Undisclosed	
12 July 2019	Ianis Hagi	Viitorul Constanța	Genk	Undisclosed	
12 July 2019	Andrew Hjulsager	Celta Vigo	Oostende	Undisclosed	
12 July 2019	Francis N'Ganga	Ermis Aradippou	Lokeren	Free	
13 July 2019	Rai Vloet	Sint-Truiden	Excelsior	Free	
15 July 2019	Kouadio-Yves Dabila	Lille	Cercle Brugge	Loan	
15 July 2019	Jordi Mboula	Monaco	Cercle Brugge	Loan	
15 July 2019	Diego Montiel	Beerschot	Vejle	Free	
15 July 2019	Thomas Nzinga	Londerzeel	Lokeren	Undisclosed	
15 July 2019	Stef Peeters	Caen	Cercle Brugge	Undisclosed	(Note: Peeters was on loan from Caen to Zulte Waregem during the 2018-19 season, the loan ended and Peeters was now sold to Cercle Brugge.)
15 July 2019	Yuma Suzuki	Kashima Antlers	Sint-Truiden	Undisclosed	
16 July 2019	Jens Cools	Pafos	Eupen	Undisclosed	
16 July 2019	Loïc Lapoussin	Red Star	Virton	Undisclosed	
16 July 2019	Ruslan Malinovskyi	Genk	Atalanta	Undisclosed	
16 July 2019	Christoffer Remmer	Molde	Westerlo	Free	
16 July 2019	Vincent Rousseau	Standard Liège	Virton	Undisclosed	
16 July 2019	Alan Goncalves Sousa	Vejle	Sint-Truiden	Loan	
17 July 2019	Sheldon Bateau	Sarpsborg	Mechelen	Undisclosed	
17 July 2019	Romain Matthys	RFC Liège	Eupen	Undisclosed	
17 July 2019	Milad Mohammadi	Akhmat Grozny	Gent	Undisclosed	
17 July 2019	Aristote Nkaka	Anderlecht	Almería	Loan	(Note: Nkaka was on loan from Anderlecht to Oostende during the second half of the 2018-19 season, the loan ended and Nkaka was now loaned to Almeria.)
17 July 2019	Philippe Sandler	Manchester City	Anderlecht	Loan	
18 July 2019	Joan Campins	Fehérvár	Excel Mouscron	Undisclosed	
18 July 2019	Nicolò Cudrig	Cercle Brugge	Monaco	Undisclosed	
18 July 2019	Ortwin De Wolf	Lokeren	Eupen	Undisclosed	
18 July 2019	Modou Diagne	Nancy	Charleroi	Undisclosed	
18 July 2019	Carlos Embaló	Palermo	Eupen	Undisclosed	
18 July 2019	Eric Ocansey	Eupen	Kortrijk	Undisclosed	
18 July 2019	Rafał Pietrzak	Wisła Kraków	Excel Mouscron	Undisclosed	
19 July 2019	Jonathan Buatu	Rio Ave	Excel Mouscron	Loan	
19 July 2019	Teddy Chevalier	Kortrijk	Valenciennes	Undisclosed	
19 July 2019	Aboubakary Koita	Gent	Waasland-Beveren	Undisclosed	(Note: Koita was on loan from Gent to Kortrijk during the second half of the 2018-19 season, the loan ended and Keita was now sold to Waasland-Beveren.)
19 July 2019	Erhan Mašović	Club Brugge	Horsens	Undisclosed	(Note: Mašović was on loan from Club Brugge to Trenčín during the 2018-19 season, the loan ended and Mašović was now loaned to Horsens.)
19 July 2019	Michael Ngadeu-Ngadjui	Slavia Prague	Gent	Undisclosed	
19 July 2019	Gino van Kessel	Roeselare	Spartak Trnava	Undisclosed	
20 July 2019	Théo Defourny	Tubize	Lokeren	Undisclosed	
20 July 2019	Abdou Diakhaté	Parma	Lokeren	Loan	
20 July 2019	Kara Mbodji	Anderlecht	Al-Sailiya	Undisclosed	
20 July 2019	Andreas Wiegel	MSV Duisburg	Waasland-Beveren	Undisclosed	
21 July 2019	Berke Özer	Fenerbahçe	Westerlo	Loan	
22 July 2019	Kosuke Kinoshita	Sint-Truiden	Stabæk	Undisclosed	
22 July 2019	Benjamin Lambot	Cercle Brugge	Nea Salamis Famagusta	Free	
23 July 2019	Laurent Depoitre	Huddersfield Town	Gent	Free	
23 July 2019	Adrián Lapeña	Real Sociedad B	Eupen	Undisclosed	
23 July 2019	Stéphane Oméonga	Genoa	Cercle Brugge	Loan	
23 July 2019	Leonardo Miramar Rocha	Lommel	Eupen	Undisclosed	
23 July 2019	Matthias Verreth	PSV Eindhoven	Waasland-Beveren	Undisclosed	
24 July 2019	Gianni Bruno	Cercle Brugge	Zulte Waregem	Free	
24 July 2019	Olivier Deschacht	Lokeren	Zulte Waregem	Free	
24 July 2019	Prince Ibara	Alger	Beerschot	Undisclosed	
24 July 2019	Lamine N'dao	ASEC Mimosas	Lokeren	Free	
24 July 2019	Youssouf Niakaté	Union SG	Al-Wehda Club	Undisclosed	
24 July 2019	Tomas Švedkauskas	Riteriai	Lommel	Undisclosed	
24 July 2019	Florian Tardieu	Zulte Waregem	Troyes	Undisclosed	
24 July 2019	Yannick Thoelen	Gent	Mechelen	Undisclosed	
25 July 2019	Carlos David	Union SG	Cartagena	Free	
25 July 2019	Anderson Esiti	Gent	PAOK	Undisclosed	
25 July 2019	Alieu Jallow	Superstars Academy	Lommel	Undisclosed	
25 July 2019	Salif Kujabi	Superstars Academy	Lommel	Undisclosed	
25 July 2019	Abdoulie Sanyang	Superstars Academy	Lommel	Undisclosed	
25 July 2019	Thallyson	Sint-Truiden	Guarani	Free	
25 July 2019	Andrija Vukčević	Spartak Subotica	Waasland-Beveren	Undisclosed	
26 July 2019	Nill De Pauw	Zulte Waregem	Çaykur Rizespor	Undisclosed	
26 July 2019	Mohamed Fadhloun	Virton	Lyon-Duchère	Undisclosed	
26 July 2019	Nik Lorbek	Mura	Union SG	Undisclosed	
26 July 2019	Arne Naudts	SpVgg Unterhaching	Lommel	Undisclosed	
26 July 2019	Steven Pinto-Borges	Union SG	Annecy	Free	
26 July 2019	Beka Vachiberadze	FK RFS	Lommel	Undisclosed	
26 July 2019	Dante Vanzeir	Genk	Mechelen	Loan	(Note: Vanzeir was on loan from Genk to Beerschot during the 2018-19 season, the loan ended and Vanzeir was now loaned to Mechelen.)
29 July 2019	Joeri Dequevy	OH Leuven	RWDM47	Free	
29 July 2019	Christian Luyindama	Standard Liège	Galatasaray	€5 000 000	(Note: Luyindama was already on loan from Standard Liège to Galatasaray during the second half of the 2018-19 season, the loan ended but Galatasaray activated the clause to make the transfer permanent.)
29 July 2019	Ivan Santini	Anderlecht	Jiangsu Suning	Undisclosed	
29 July 2019	Percy Tau	Brighton & Hove Albion	Club Brugge	Loan	(Note: Tau was on loan from Brighton & Hove Albion to Union SG during the 2018-19 season, the loan ended and Tau was now loaned to Club Brugge.)
30 July 2019	Ryuta Koike	Kashiwa Reysol	Lokeren	Undisclosed	
30 July 2019	Milan Massop	Waasland-Beveren	Silkeborg	Free	
30 July 2019	Antonio Romero	Zamora	Union SG	Loan	
31 July 2019	Idir Boutrif	Sampdoria	Virton	Undisclosed	
31 July 2019	Noah Fadiga	Club Brugge	Volendam	Loan	
31 July 2019	Corentin Fiore	Palermo	Cercle Brugge	Free	
31 July 2019	Darren Keet	Bidvest Wits	OH Leuven	Undisclosed	
31 July 2019	Kolbeinn Þórðarson	Breiðablik	Lommel	Undisclosed	
31 July 2019	Mehdi Terki	Lokeren	Xanthi	Undisclosed	
31 July 2019	Žarko Tomašević	Oostende	Astana	Free	
31 July 2019	Jonathan Vervoort	Dender EH	Roeselare	Undisclosed	

=== August 2019 ===
Date	Name	Moving from	Moving to	Fee	Note
1 August 2019	Jordi Amat	Rayo Vallecano	Eupen	Loan	
1 August 2019	Arnaut Danjuma	Club Brugge	Bournemouth	Undisclosed	
1 August 2019	Marvelous Nakamba	Club Brugge	Aston Villa	Undisclosed	
1 August 2019	Cedric Omoigui	Fuenlabrada	Excel Mouscron	Undisclosed	
1 August 2019	Victor Osimhen	Charleroi	Lille	Undisclosed	
1 August 2019	Nicolas Rommens	Westerlo	Roeselare	Undisclosed	
1 August 2019	Wesley Vanbelle	Lommel	Roeselare	Undisclosed	
1 August 2019	Hendrik Van Crombrugge	Eupen	Anderlecht	Undisclosed	
2 August 2019	Emil Abaz	Beerschot	Borec	Free	
2 August 2019	Luan Peres	Club Brugge	Santos	Loan	
2 August 2019	Bubacarr Sanneh	Anderlecht	Göztepe	Loan	
3 August 2019	Idir Ouali	Kortrijk	Hatayspor	Free	
4 August 2019	Simon Mignolet	Liverpool	Club Brugge	Undisclosed	
5 August 2019	Jérémy Grain	Virton	Lyon-Duchère	Undisclosed	
5 August 2019	Jens Naessens	Westerlo	Roeselare	Free	
6 August 2019	Thomas Agyepong	Manchester City	Waasland-Beveren	Loan	
6 August 2019	Sebastiaan Bornauw	Anderlecht	1. FC Köln	Undisclosed	
6 August 2019	José Cevallos	Lokeren	Portimonense	Loan	
6 August 2019	Abdoul Karim Danté	Anderlecht	Virton	Undisclosed	
6 August 2019	Ivan Fiolić	Genk	AEK Larnaca	Loan	
6 August 2019	Natanaël Frenoy	Standard Liège	MVV	Loan	
6 August 2019	Kemar Roofe	Leeds United	Anderlecht	Undisclosed	
6 August 2019	Arnaud Souquet	Gent	Montpellier	Undisclosed	
6 August 2019	Marco Túlio	Sporting CP	Roeselare	Loan	
6 August 2019	Tuta	Eintracht Frankfurt	Kortrijk	Loan	
7 August 2019	Denis Drăguș	Viitorul Constanța	Standard Liège	Undisclosed	
7 August 2019	Noë Dussenne	Excel Mouscron	Standard Liège	Undisclosed	
7 August 2019	Romain Grange	Charleroi	Châteauroux	Undisclosed	(Note: Grange was on loan from Charleroi to Grenoble during the second half of the 2018-19 season, the loan ended and Grange was now sold to Châteauroux.)
7 August 2019	Guillermo Ochoa	Standard Liège	América	Undisclosed	
7 August 2019	Rémy Riou	Charleroi	Caen	Undisclosed	
7 August 2019	Idrissa Sylla	Zulte Waregem	Oostende	Loan	
8 August 2019	Rémy Descamps	Paris Saint-Germain	Charleroi	Undisclosed	
8 August 2019	Erwin Hoffer	Beerschot	Admira Wacker	Free	
8 August 2019	Michael Verrips	Mechelen	Sheffield United	Free	(Note: While Sheffield United claim to have signed Verrips as a free agent, Mechelen are contesting this and demand a transfer fee.)
9 August 2019	William Balikwisha	Standard Liège	Cercle Brugge	Loan	
9 August 2019	Saido Berahino	Stoke City	Zulte Waregem	Free	
9 August 2019	Abdoulaye Diaby	Antwerp	Lokeren	Loan	
9 August 2019	Sigurd Hauso Haugen	Sogndal	Union SG	Undisclosed	
9 August 2019	Thomas Wildemeersch	Charleroi	Francs Borains	Loan	
10 August 2019	Jordi Vanlerberghe	Club Brugge	Mechelen	Loan	(Note: Vanlerberghe was on loan from Club Brugge to Oostende during the 2018-19 season, the loan ended and Vanlerberghe was now loaned to Mechelen.)
11 August 2019	Nacer Chadli	Monaco	Anderlecht	Loan	
11 August 2019	Dimitri Daeseleire	OH Leuven	Rupel Boom	Free	
11 August 2019	Pierre-Yves Ngawa	Perugia	OH Leuven	Free	
12 August 2019	Lloyd Palun	Cercle Brugge	Guingamp	Free	
12 August 2019	David Pollet	Charleroi	Gazélec Ajaccio	Undisclosed	(Note: Pollet was on loan from Charleroi to Eupen during the 2018-19 season, the loan ended and Pollet was now sold to Gazélec Ajaccio.)
13 August 2019	Renan Areias	Corinthians	Roeselare	Undisclosed	
13 August 2019	Facundo Colidio	Inter Milan	Sint-Truiden	Loan	
13 August 2019	Wataru Endo	Sint-Truiden	VfB Stuttgart	Loan	
13 August 2019	Karlo Lulić	Waasland-Beveren	Slaven Belupo	Loan	
13 August 2019	Bojan Nastić	Genk	Free Agent	Released	(Note: Nastić was on loan from Genk to Oostende during the second half of the 2018-19 season. The loan ended and Nastić was now released.)
13 August 2019	Shamar Nicholson	Domžale	Charleroi	Undisclosed	
14 August 2019	Pierre Ramses Akono	Eding Sport	Eupen	Undisclosed	
14 August 2019	Chris Bedia	Charleroi	Troyes	Loan	(Note: Bedia was on loan from Charleroi to Zulte Waregem during the 2018-19 season. The loan ended and Bedia was now loaned to Troyes.)
14 August 2019	Federico Ricca	Málaga	Club Brugge	Undisclosed	
15 August 2019	Ahmed El Messaoudi	Mechelen	Groningen	Undisclosed	(Note: El Messaoudi was on loan from Mechelen to Fortuna Sittard during the 2018-19 season. The loan ended and El Messaoudi was now sold to Groningen.)
15 August 2019	Floriano Vanzo	Waasland-Beveren	Virton	Undisclosed	
16 August 2019	Abel Alejandro Caputo	Levante	Roeselare	Undisclosed	
16 August 2019	Cédric Vangeel	Westerlo	Hades	Free	(Note: Vangeel was on loan from Westerlo to Hasselt during the 2018-19 season. The loan ended and Vangeel was now released to Hades.)
17 August 2019	Miloš Kosanović	Standard Liège	Al Jazira	Undisclosed	
17 August 2019	Leo Njengo	OH Leuven	Visé	Free	(Note: Njengo was on loan from OH Leuven to Heist during the second half of the 2018-19 season. The loan ended and Njengo was now released to Visé.)
19 August 2019	Godfred Donsah	Bologna	Cercle Brugge	Loan	
19 August 2019	Alimami Gory	Le Havre	Cercle Brugge	Undisclosed	
19 August 2019	Adam Jakubech	Lille	Kortrijk	Loan	
19 August 2019	Faïz Selemani	Union SG	Kortrijk	Undisclosed	
20 August 2019	Kjetil Borry	Roeselare	Dender EH	Free	
20 August 2019	Urtzi Iriondo	Union SG	Barakaldo	Undisclosed	
20 August 2019	Karlo Letica	Club Brugge	SPAL	Loan	
20 August 2019	Jarno Libert	OH Leuven	RWDM47	Undisclosed	
20 August 2019	Koji Miyoshi	Kawasaki Frontale	Antwerp	Loan	
20 August 2019	Omid Noorafkan	Charleroi	Sepahan	Loan	(Note: Noorafkan was on loan from Charleroi to Esteghlal during the second half of the 2018-19 season. The loan ended and Noorafkan was now loaned to Troyes.)
21 August 2019	Thomas Azevedo	Lommel	Patro Eisden Maasmechelen	Undisclosed	
21 August 2019	Nicky Beloko	Fiorentina	Gent	Loan	
21 August 2019	Lassana Coulibaly	Angers	Cercle Brugge	Loan	
21 August 2019	Sven Kums	Anderlecht	Gent	Loan	
21 August 2019	Jhonny Lucas	Paraná	Sint-Truiden	Undisclosed	
21 August 2019	Kingsley Madu	Zulte Waregem	OB	Free	(Note: Madu was on loan from Zulte Waregem to Roeselare during the second half of the 2018-19 season. The loan ended and Madu was now sold to OB.)
21 August 2019	Said Ahmed Said	Rio Ave	Lokeren	Loan	
22 August 2019	Sofyan Amrabat	Club Brugge	Hellas Verona	Loan	
22 August 2019	Tatsuya Ito	Hamburger SV	Sint-Truiden	Loan	
22 August 2019	Nikos Karelis	Genk	Brentford	Free	
22 August 2019	James Lawrence	Anderlecht	St. Pauli	Loan	
22 August 2019	Paul Onuachu	Midtjylland	Genk	Undisclosed	
22 August 2019	Frantzdy Pierrot	Excel Mouscron	Guingamp	Undisclosed	
23 August 2019	Stipe Perica	Udinese	Excel Mouscron	Loan	
23 August 2019	Josué Sá	Anderlecht	Huesca	Loan	(Note: Sá was on loan from Anderlecht to Kasımpaşa during the 2018-19 season. The loan ended and Sá was now loaned to Huesca.)
23 August 2019	Harouna Sy	Red Star	Roeselare	Undisclosed	
23 August 2019	Siemen Voet	Club Brugge	Roeselare	Loan	
24 August 2019	Wouter Corstjens	Westerlo	Patro Eisden Maasmechelen	Loan	
24 August 2019	Maximilian Jansen	Virton	Free Agent	Release	
25 August 2019	Redouane Kerrouche	OH Leuven	Aves	Undisclosed	
26 August 2019	Ethan Bryant	San Antonio	Roeselare	Undisclosed	
26 August 2019	Steve De Ridder	Lokeren	Sint-Truiden	Undisclosed	
26 August 2019	Seth De Witte	Mechelen	Lokeren	Free	
26 August 2019	Aristote Nkaka	Anderlecht	Racing Santander	Loan	(Note: Nkaka was sent out on loan from Anderlecht to Almería just a few weeks earlier, but the loan was terminated early and Nkaka was instead loaned to Racing Santander.)
27 August 2019	Kristal Abazaj	Anderlecht	Kukësi	Loan	(Note: Abazaj was on loan from Anderlecht to Osijek since February, the loan ended and Abazaj was now loaned to Kukësi.)
27 August 2019	Jarno De Smet	Kortrijk	Beerschot	Undisclosed	
27 August 2019	Fraser Hornby	Everton	Kortrijk	Loan	
27 August 2019	Elton Kabangu	Gent	Willem II	Undisclosed	(Note: Kabangu was on loan from Gent to FC Eindhoven since the 2017 summer transfer window. The loan ended and Kabangu was now sold to Willem II.)
27 August 2019	Diogo Queirós	Porto B	Excel Mouscron	Loan	
27 August 2019	Kaveh Rezaei	Club Brugge	Charleroi	Loan	
27 August 2019	Sigurd Rosted	Gent	Brøndby	Undisclosed	
27 August 2019	Ahmed Touba	Club Brugge	Beroe Stara Zagora	Loan	(Note: Touba was on loan from Club Brugge to OH Leuven during the 2018-19 season, the loan ended and Touba was now loaned to Beroe Stara Zagora.)
27 August 2019	Yentl Van Genechten	Westerlo	Tessenderlo	Loan	
28 August 2019	Saeid Ezatolahi	Rostov	Eupen	Loan	
28 August 2019	Issa Kabore	Rahimo	Mechelen	Undisclosed	
28 August 2019	Mory Konaté	Borussia Dortmund II	Sint-Truiden	Undisclosed	
28 August 2019	Sanjin Lelić	FK Sarajevo	Roeselare	Undisclosed	
28 August 2019	Pape M'Bow	Virton	Le Puy	Free	
28 August 2019	Amir Nouri	Béziers	Roeselare	Undisclosed	
28 August 2019	Dylan Ouédraogo	Apollon Limassol	OH Leuven	Undisclosed	
28 August 2019	Frank Tsadjout	Milan	Charleroi	Loan	
28 August 2019	Aaron Tshibola	Aston Villa	Waasland-Beveren	Undisclosed	
29 August 2019	Ibrahim Kargbo Jr.	Roeselare	Lierse Kempenzonen	Loan	
29 August 2019	Angelos Kotsopoulos	Asteras Tripolis	Mechelen	Undisclosed	
29 August 2019	Stallone Limbombe	Gent	Giresunspor	Loan	
29 August 2019	Gideon Mensah	Red Bull Salzburg	Zulte Waregem	Loan	
29 August 2019	Dauda Mohammed	Anderlecht	Esbjerg	Loan	(Note: Mohammed was on loan from Anderlecht to Vitesse during the second half of the 2018-19 season, the loan ended and Mohammed was now loaned to Esbjerg.)
29 August 2019	Abdoulaye Sissako	Châteauroux	Zulte Waregem	Undisclosed	
29 August 2019	Eric Smith	Gent	Tromsø	Loan	
30 August 2019	Arthur Devos	Roeselare	Mandel United	Loan	
30 August 2019	Chris Durkin	D.C. United	Sint-Truiden	Loan	
30 August 2019	Fiorin Durmishaj	Olympiacos	Waasland-Beveren	Loan	
30 August 2019	Lyle Foster	Monaco	Cercle Brugge	Loan	
30 August 2019	Michaël Heylen	Zulte Waregem	Emmen	Undisclosed	
30 August 2019	Kirill Klimov	Cercle Brugge	Monaco	Undisclosed	
30 August 2019	Seung-woo Lee	Hellas Verona	Sint-Truiden	Undisclosed	
30 August 2019	Antonio Milić	Anderlecht	Rayo Vallecano	Loan	
30 August 2019	Kevin Mirallas	Everton	Antwerp	Free	
30 August 2019	Jonathan Panzo	Monaco	Cercle Brugge	Loan	
30 August 2019	Baptiste Schmisser	Roeselare	Torhout	Free	
31 August 2019	Santiago Colombatto	Cagliari	Sint-Truiden	Undisclosed	
31 August 2019	Derrick Luckassen	PSV Eindhoven	Anderlecht	Loan	
31 August 2019	Alexandre Ramalingom	Béziers	Virton	Undisclosed	
31 August 2019	Alyson Santos Silva	São Bernardo	Roeselare	Undisclosed	
31 August 2019	Kevin Wimmer	Stoke City	Excel Mouscron	Loan	

=== September 2019 ===
Date	Name	Moving from	Moving to	Fee	Note
1 September 2019	Soufyan Ahannach	Brighton & Hove Albion	Union SG	Loan	
1 September 2019	Robbe Decostere	Cercle Brugge	Tubize	Loan	
1 September 2019	Omid Ebrahimi	Al Ahli	Eupen	Loan	
1 September 2019	Cyril Ngonge	Club Brugge	Jong PSV	Loan	
1 September 2019	Charles Vanhoutte	Cercle Brugge	Tubize	Loan	
2 September 2019	Éder Álvarez Balanta	Basel	Club Brugge	Undisclosed	
2 September 2019	Yhoan Andzouana	Girona	Roeselare	Undisclosed	
2 September 2019	Brandon Baiye	Club Brugge	Clermont Foot	Free	
2 September 2019	Robbe Bakelandt	Roeselare	Sint-Eloois-Winkel	Loan	
2 September 2019	Rodrigo Bassani da Cruz	Ituano	Roeselare	Undisclosed	
2 September 2019	Adrian Beck	Union SG	Hamilton Academical	Loan	
2 September 2019	Manuel Benson	Genk	Antwerp	Undisclosed	(Note: Benson was on loan from Genk to Excel Mouscron during the 2018-19 season, the loan ended and Benson was now sold to Antwerp.)
2 September 2019	Giorgi Beridze	Gent	Lokeren	Loan	(Note: Beridze was on loan from Gent to Újpest during the 2018-19 season, the loan ended and Beridze was now loaned to Lokeren.)
2 September 2019	Jonathan Bolingi	Antwerp	Eupen	Loan	
2 September 2019	Kevin Debaty	Waasland-Beveren	Free Agent	Released	
2 September 2019	Steven Defour	Burnley	Antwerp	Free	
2 September 2019	Olivier Dhauholou	Anderlecht	Waasland-Beveren	Loan	
2 September 2019	Mbaye Diagne	Galatasaray	Club Brugge	Loan	
2 September 2019	Samuel Fabris	Virton	Eendracht Aalst	Loan	
2 September 2019	Francesco Forte	Waasland-Beveren	Juve Stabia	Loan	
2 September 2019	Rodrigo Fumaça	Ituano	Roeselare	Undisclosed	
2 September 2019	Zinho Gano	Genk	Antwerp	Loan	
2 September 2019	Aleix García	Manchester City	Excel Mouscron	Loan	
2 September 2019	Lillo Guarneri	Milan	Excel Mouscron	Undisclosed	
2 September 2019	Wesley Hoedt	Southampton	Antwerp	Loan	
2 September 2019	Tom Holmes	Reading	Roeselare	Loan	
2 September 2019	Nordin Jackers	Genk	Waasland-Beveren	Loan	
2 September 2019	Anouar Kali	NAC Breda	Virton	Loan	
2 September 2019	Aboubakary Kanté	Cercle Brugge	Le Mans	Loan	
2 September 2019	Amine Khammas	Genk	Lommel	Loan	(Note: Khammas was on loan from Genk to Den Bosch during the 2018-19 season, the loan ended and Khammas was now loaned to Lommel.)
2 September 2019	Mitja Krizan	Bravo	Lommel	Undisclosed	
2 September 2019	Gregory Kuisch	PSV Eindhoven	Roeselare	Loan	
2 September 2019	Mićo Kuzmanović	Excel Mouscron	Rudar Velenje	Free	
2 September 2019	Andy Lokando	Westerlo	Tubize	Free	(Note: Lokando was on loan from Westerlo to Francs Borains during the second half of the 2018-19 season, the loan ended and Lokando was now released to Tubize.)
2 September 2019	Dylan Mbayo	Lokeren	Gent	Undisclosed	
2 September 2019	Jenthe Mertens	OH Leuven	Go Ahead Eagles	Undisclosed	
2 September 2019	Yehor Nazaryna	Antwerp	Karpaty Lviv	Loan	
2 September 2019	Adalberto Peñaranda	Watford	Eupen	Loan	
2 September 2019	Jérémy Perbet	Charleroi	OH Leuven	Loan	
2 September 2019	Rincón	Laval	Roeselare	Undisclosed	
2 September 2019	Héctor Rodas	Cercle Brugge	Cultural Leonesa	Free	(Note: Rodas was on loan from Cercle Brugge to Alcorcón since the summer of 2017, the loan was terminated and Rodas was released to Cultural Leonesa.)
2 September 2019	Emile Samyn	Roeselare	Lierse Kempenzonen	Loan	
2 September 2019	Lucas Schoofs	Gent	Heracles Almelo	Undisclosed	(Note: Schoofs was on loan from Gent to NAC Bread since early 2018, the loan ended and Schoofs was now sold to Heracles Almelo.)
2 September 2019	Brendan Schoonbaert	Club Brugge	Lommel	Loan	
2 September 2019	Luciano Slagveer	Lokeren	Emmen	Undisclosed	(Note: Slagveer was already on loan from Lokeren to Emmen during the 2018-19 season. The loan ended but all parties agreed to make the treansfer permanent.)
2 September 2019	Salimo Sylla	Xanthi	Virton	Free	
2 September 2019	Kafoumba Touré	Antwerp	Tubize	Loan	
2 September 2019	Vinni Triboulet	Nancy	Virton	Loan	
2 September 2019	Milan Tučić	Rudar Velenje	OH Leuven	Undisclosed	
2 September 2019	Julien Vercauteren	Virton	RWDM47	Undisclosed	
2 September 2019	Olivier Verdon	Deportivo Alavés	Eupen	Loan	
3 September 2019	Uche Henry Agbo	Standard Liège	Braga	Loan	(Note: Agbo was on loan from Standard Liège to Rayo Vallecano during the second half of the 2018-19 season. The loan ended and Agbo was now loaned to Braga.)
3 September 2019	Franko Andrijašević	Gent	Rijeka	Loan	(Note: Andrijašević was on loan from Gent to Waasland-Beveren during the second half of the 2018-19 season. The loan ended and Andrijašević was now loaned to Rijeka.)
3 September 2019	Mohammed Aoulad	Roeselare	Free Agent	Released	
3 September 2019	Aliko Bala	Zulte Waregem	Free Agent	Undisclosed	
3 September 2019	Geoffry Hairemans	Antwerp	Mechelen	Undisclosed	
3 September 2019	Xavi Molina	Eupen	Córdoba	Free	
3 September 2019	Urho Nissilä	Zulte Waregem	MVV Maastricht	Loan	
3 September 2019	Ben Reichert	Zulte Waregem	Free Agent	Undisclosed	
3 September 2019	Arsenio Valpoort	Roeselare	Excelsior	Free	
3 September 2019	Bryan Verboom	Zulte Waregem	RWDM47	Free	
3 September 2019	Ivan Yagan	Eupen	Free Agent	Released	
4 September 2019	Armin Mujakic	Atromitos	Lommel	Free	
4 September 2019	Jakub Řezníček	Lokeren	Teplice	Undisclosed	
4 September 2019	Tim Siekman	Emmen	Lommel	Free	

== Sorted by team ==
=== Belgian First Division A teams ===
==== Anderlecht ====
In:

No.	Pos.	Nation	Player
—	MF	BEL	Nacer Chadli (on loan from Monaco)
—	MF	ROU	Alexandru Chipciu (loan return from Sparta Prague)
—	FW	BEL	Landry Dimata (was on loan from VfL Wolfsburg, now bought)
—	FW	SWE	Isaac Kiese Thelin (loan return from Bayer Leverkusen)
—	DF	BEL	Vincent Kompany (from Manchester City)
—	DF	NED	Derrick Luckassen (on loan from PSV Eindhoven)
—	FW	ZIM	Knowledge Musona (loan return from Lokeren)
—	MF	FRA	Samir Nasri (from West Ham United)
—	GK	BEL	Davy Roef (loan return from Waasland-Beveren)
—	FW	ENG	Kemar Roofe (from Leeds United)
—	DF	NED	Philippe Sandler (on loan from Manchester City)
—	GK	BEL	Hendrik Van Crombrugge (from Eupen)
—	MF	NED	Michel Vlap (from Heerenveen)

Out:

No.	Pos.	Nation	Player
3	DF	ENG	James Lawrence (on loan to St. Pauli)
11	MF	COD	Yannick Bolasie (loan return to Everton)
12	MF	FRA	Dennis Appiah (to Nantes)
19	FW	CRO	Ivan Santini (to Jiangsu Suning)
20	MF	BEL	Sven Kums (on loan to Gent)
26	DF	GAM	Bubacarr Sanneh (on loan to Göztepe)
30	GK	NED	Boy de Jong (to Stellenbosch)
37	DF	SRB	Ivan Obradović (to Legia Warsaw)
42	DF	BEL	Hannes Delcroix (on loan to RKC Waalwijk)
44	DF	CRO	Antonio Milić (on loan to Rayo Vallecano)
45	DF	BEL	Sebastiaan Bornauw (to 1. FC Köln)
47	DF	MLI	Abdoul Karim Danté (to Virton)
52	GK	BEL	Ilias Moutha-Sebtaoui (to Charleroi)
55	DF	BIH	Ognjen Vranješ (on loan to AEK Athens)
—	MF	ALB	Kristal Abazaj (was on loan to Osijek, now loaned to Kukësi)
—	MF	BEL	Leander Dendoncker (was on loan to Wolverhampton Wanderers, now sold)
—	FW	CIV	Olivier Dhauholou (on loan to Waasland-Beveren)
—	FW	CGO	Silvère Ganvoula (was on loan to VfL Bochum, now sold)
—	DF	SEN	Kara Mbodji (to Al-Sailiya)
—	FW	GHA	Dauda Mohammed (was on loan to Vitesse, now loaned to Esbjerg)
—	FW	JPN	Ryota Morioka (was on loan to Charleroi, now sold)
—	MF	BEL	Aristote Nkaka (was on loan to Oostende, then initially loaned to Almería, thereafter loaned to Racing Santander)
—	DF	POR	Josué Sá (was on loan to Kasımpaşa, now loaned to Huesca)

==== Antwerp ====
In:

No.	Pos.	Nation	Player
—	MF	BEL	Manuel Benson (from Genk)
—	MF	BEL	Sander Coopman (from Oostende)
—	MF	BEL	Steven Defour (from Burnley)
—	DF	BEL	Ritchie De Laet (from Aston Villa)
—	MF	BEL	Alexis De Sart (from Sint-Truiden)
—	FW	BEL	Zinho Gano (on loan from Genk)
—	MF	TUN	Nader Ghandri (loan return from Westerlo)
—	DF	NED	Wesley Hoedt (on loan from Southampton)
—	MF	CMR	Martin Hongla (from Recreativo Granada)
—	FW	BEL	Kevin Mirallas (from Everton)
—	MF	JPN	Koji Miyoshi (on loan from Kawasaki Frontale)
—	DF	NGR	Junior Pius (from Paços de Ferreira)
—	MF	ISR	Lior Refaelov (was on loan from Club Brugge, now bought)

Out:

No.	Pos.	Nation	Player
9	FW	COD	Jonathan Bolingi (on loan to Eupen)
19	FW	GHA	William Owusu (to Ajman)
20	MF	BEL	Geoffry Hairemans (to Mechelen)
22	MF	POR	David Simão (to AEK Athens)
23	MF	MEX	Omar Govea (loan return to Porto B)
29	MF	UKR	Yehor Nazaryna (on loan to Karpaty Lviv)
37	DF	BEL	Jelle Van Damme (to Lokeren)
—	MF	MLI	Abdoulaye Diaby (on loan to Lokeren)
—	MF	BEL	Nando Nöstlinger (to RKC Waalwijk)
—	FW	MLI	Kafoumba Touré (on loan to Tubize)

==== Cercle Brugge ====
In:

No.	Pos.	Nation	Player
—	GK	FRA	Loïc Badiashile (on loan from Monaco)
—	MF	COD	William Balikwisha (on loan from Standard Liège)
—	DF	FRA	Giulian Biancone (on loan from Monaco)
—	MF	MLI	Lassana Coulibaly (on loan from Angers)
—	DF	CIV	Kouadio-Yves Dabila (on loan from Lille)
—	MF	GHA	Godfred Donsah (on loan from Bologna)
—	DF	BEL	Corentin Fiore (from Palermo)
—	FW	RSA	Lyle Foster (on loan from Monaco)
—	GK	BEL	Merveille Goblet (free agent)
—	FW	FRA	Alimami Gory (from Le Havre)
—	MF	BEL	Kylian Hazard (was on loan from Chelsea, now bought)
—	GK	BEL	Guillaume Hubert (on loan from Club Brugge)
—	MF	MLI	Rominigue Kouamé (on loan from Lille)
—	FW	ESP	Jordi Mboula (on loan from Monaco)
—	MF	BEL	Stéphane Oméonga (on loan from Genoa)
—	DF	ENG	Jonathan Panzo (on loan from Monaco)
—	MF	BEL	Stef Peeters (from Caen)
—	FW	ALG	Idriss Saadi (on loan from Strasbourg)
—	DF	FRA	Julien Serrano (on loan from Monaco)

Out:

No.	Pos.	Nation	Player
1	GK	FRA	Paul Nardi (loan return to Monaco)
2	DF	CMR	Pierre-Daniel N'Guinda (loan return to Monaco)
6	MF	TOG	Serge Gakpé (to Apollon Limassol)
8	MF	GAB	Lloyd Palun (to Guingamp)
9	FW	BEL	Gianni Bruno (to Zulte Waregem)
10	MF	FRA	Xavier Mercier (to OH Leuven)
11	MF	FRA	Guévin Tormin (loan return to Monaco)
14	FW	FRA	Irvin Cardona (loan return to Monaco)
17	DF	FRA	Yoann Etienne (loan return to Monaco)
18	MF	FRA	Nabil Alioui (loan return to Monaco)
19	MF	BEL	Benjamin Lambot (to Nea Salamis Famagusta)
22	MF	NED	Anderson López (loan return to Monaco)
23	DF	FRA	Issa Marega (to Châteauroux)
25	GK	BEL	Brian Vandenbussche (to Blankenberge)
26	MF	FRA	Kévin Appin (loan return to Monaco)
28	DF	FRA	Benjamin Delacourt (to RWDM47)
30	MF	MLI	Adama Traoré (loan return to Monaco)
—	FW	ITA	Nicolò Cudrig (to Monaco)
—	MF	BEL	Robbe Decostere (on loan to Tubize)
—	FW	FRA	Aboubakary Kanté (signed from Béziers, then loaned to Le Mans)
—	FW	RUS	Kirill Klimov (to Monaco)
—	DF	ESP	Héctor Rodas (was on loan to Alcorcón, now released to Cultural Leonesa)
—	MF	BEL	Charles Vanhoutte (on loan to Tubize)

==== Charleroi ====
In:

No.	Pos.	Nation	Player
—	GK	FRA	Rémy Descamps (from Paris Saint-Germain)
—	DF	SEN	Modou Diagne (from Nancy)
—	MF	SEN	Mamadou Fall (loan return from Eupen)
—	GK	COD	Parfait Mandanda (loan return from Dinamo București)
—	FW	JPN	Ryota Morioka (was on loan from Anderlecht, now bought)
—	FW	JAM	Shamar Nicholson (from Domžale)
—	FW	IRI	Kaveh Rezaei (on loan from Club Brugge)
—	MF	BEL	Enes Sağlık (loan return from Tubize)
—	FW	CMR	Frank Tsadjout (on loan from Milan)

Out:

No.	Pos.	Nation	Player
8	DF	ESP	Francisco Martos (to FC Andorra)
10	FW	FRA	Jérémy Perbet (on loan to OH Leuven)
10	FW	BEL	David Pollet (was on loan to Eupen, now sold to Gazélec Ajaccio)
15	GK	BEL	Valentin Baume (on loan to RWDM47)
45	FW	NGR	Victor Osimhen (was on loan from VfL Wolfsburg, then bought permanently, then sold to Lille)
69	GK	FRA	Rémy Riou (to Caen)
—	DF	ITA	Gabriele Angella (loan return to Udinese)
—	FW	CIV	Chris Bedia (was on loan to Zulte Waregem, now loaned to Troyes)
—	DF	FRA	Benjamin Boulenger (end of contract)
—	DF	FRA	Dorian Dervite (was on loan to NAC Breda, now sold to Doxa Katokopia)
—	FW	CMR	Paul Garita (was on loan to Dunkerque, now loaned to Boulogne)
—	MF	FRA	Romain Grange (was on loan to Grenoble, now sold to Châteauroux)
—	GK	BEL	Ilias Moutha-Sebtaoui (signed from Anderlecht, then loaned to F91 Dudelange)
—	MF	IRI	Omid Noorafkan (was on loan to Esteghlal, now loaned to Sepahan)
—	MF	BEL	Nathan Rodes (on loan to Union Titus Pétange)
—	MF	BEL	Thomas Wildemeersch (on loan to Francs Borains)

==== Club Brugge ====
In:

No.	Pos.	Nation	Player
2	DF	UKR	Eduard Sobol (on loan from Shakhtar Donetsk)
5	DF	CIV	Odilon Kossounou (from Hammarby)
7	MF	SEN	Amadou Sagna (from Cayor Foot)
14	MF	NGR	David Okereke (from Spezia)
17	DF	CIV	Simon Deli (from Slavia Prague)
88	GK	BEL	Simon Mignolet (from Liverpool)
—	DF	COL	Éder Álvarez Balanta (from Basel)
—	FW	SEN	Mbaye Diagne (on loan from Galatasaray)
—	DF	URU	Federico Ricca (from Málaga)
—	FW	RSA	Percy Tau (on loan from Brighton & Hove Albion)

Out:

No.	Pos.	Nation	Player
1	GK	CRO	Karlo Letica (on loan to SPAL)
5	DF	FRA	Benoît Poulain (to Kayserispor)
6	MF	MAR	Sofyan Amrabat (on loan to Hellas Verona)
7	FW	BRA	Wesley (to Aston Villa)
8	MF	ISR	Lior Refaelov (was on loan to Antwerp, now sold)
10	FW	IRI	Kaveh Rezaei (on loan to Charleroi)
18	MF	ZIM	Marvelous Nakamba (to Aston Villa)
24	DF	NED	Stefano Denswil (to Bologna)
27	FW	BEL	Cyril Ngonge (on loan to Jong PSV)
28	GK	BEL	Guillaume Hubert (on loan to Cercle Brugge)
33	MF	AUS	Riley McGree (was on loan to Melbourne City, now sold to Adelaide United)
34	GK	BEL	Brent Gabriël (to Waasland-Beveren)
35	DF	SUI	Saulo Decarli (to VfL Bochum)
40	MF	BEL	Jordi Vanlerberghe (was on loan to Oostende, now loaned to Mechelen)
47	MF	NED	Arnaut Groeneveld (to Bournemouth)
55	DF	SRB	Erhan Mašović (was on loan to Trenčín, now loaned to Horsens)
98	MF	BEL	Brandon Baiye (to Clermont Foot)
—	FW	BEL	Rik De Kuyffer (to Lommel)
—	MF	BEL	Noah Fadiga (on loan to Volendam)
—	DF	BRA	Luan Peres (on loan to Santos)
—	DF	BEL	Brendan Schoonbaert (on loan to Lommel)
—	DF	BEL	Ahmed Touba (was on loan to OH Leuven, now loaned to Beroe Stara Zagora)
—	MF	BEL	Jellert van Landschoot (was on loan to OH Leuven, now loaned to NEC)
—	DF	BEL	Siemen Voet (on loan to Roeselare)

==== Eupen ====
In:

No.	Pos.	Nation	Player
—	MF	CMR	Pierre Ramses Akono (from Eding Sport)
—	DF	ESP	Jordi Amat (on loan from Rayo Vallecano)
—	FW	ESP	Jon Bautista (on loan from Sociedad)
—	DF	GER	Andreas Beck (from VfB Stuttgart)
—	FW	COD	Jonathan Bolingi (on loan from Antwerp)
—	FW	ARG	Flavio Ciampichetti (free agent)
—	MF	BEL	Jens Cools (from Pafos)
—	GK	BEL	Ortwin De Wolf (from Lokeren)
—	MF	IRI	Omid Ebrahimi (on loan from Al Ahli)
—	FW	GBS	Carlos Embaló (from Palermo)
—	MF	IRI	Saeid Ezatolahi (on loan from Rostov)
—	DF	NED	Menno Koch (from NAC Breda)
—	DF	ESP	Adrián Lapeña (from Real Sociedad B)
—	DF	GAM	Sulayman Marreh (was on loan from Watford, now bought)
—	GK	BEL	Romain Matthys (from RFC Liège)
—	FW	POR	Leonardo Miramar Rocha (from Lommel)
—	FW	VEN	Adalberto Peñaranda (on loan from Watford)
—	DF	BEN	Olivier Verdon (on loan from Deportivo Alavés)

Out:

No.	Pos.	Nation	Player
1	GK	BEL	Hendrik Van Crombrugge (to Anderlecht)
3	DF	MLI	Cheick Keita (loan return to Birmingham City)
5	MF	SEN	Diawandou Diagne (to Delhi Dynamos)
6	MF	COD	Rémi Mulumba (end of contract)
7	DF	GER	Julian Schauerte (to Preußen Münster)
9	FW	BEL	David Pollet (loan return to Charleroi)
10	FW	ESP	Luis García (end of contract)
14	DF	BEL	Alessio Castro-Montes (to Gent)
17	MF	TUN	Youssef Msakni (loan return to Al-Duhail)
21	FW	SEN	Moussa Diallo (to RWDM47)
23	FW	FRA	Samuel Essende (loan return to Paris Saint-Germain)
25	DF	BEL	Rocky Bushiri (loan return to Oostende)
28	MF	GHA	Eric Ocansey (to Kortrijk)
30	GK	SEN	Babacar Niasse (end of contract)
31	FW	ARM	Ivan Yagan (released)
44	DF	ESP	Xavi Molina (to Córdoba)
70	MF	SEN	Mamadou Fall (loan return to Charleroi)
—	DF	CRC	Carlos Martínez (was on loan to Herediano, then sold to Guadalupe)

==== Excel Mouscron ====
In:

No.	Pos.	Nation	Player
—	FW	TUN	Sami Allagui (from St. Pauli)
—	MF	MNE	Marko Bakić (was on loan from Braga, now bought)
—	DF	ANG	Jonathan Buatu (on loan from Rio Ave)
—	DF	ESP	Joan Campins (from Fehérvár)
—	DF	BEL	Alessandro Ciranni (from Fortuna Sittard)
—	DF	ESP	Aleix García (on loan from Manchester City)
—	FW	ITA	Lillo Guarneri (from Milan)
—	MF	MNE	Deni Hočko (from Famalicão)
—	DF	BEL	Jérémy Huyghebaert (loan return from Neuchâtel Xamax)
—	FW	NGR	Cedric Omoigui (from Fuenlabrada)
—	FW	GHA	Jonah Osabutey (on loan from Werder Bremen II)
—	FW	CRO	Stipe Perica (on loan from Udinese)
—	DF	POL	Rafał Pietrzak (from Wisła Kraków)
—	DF	POR	Diogo Queirós (on loan from Porto B)
—	DF	AUT	Kevin Wimmer (on loan from Stoke City)

Out:

No.	Pos.	Nation	Player
2	DF	BEL	Noë Dussenne (to Standard Liège)
8	MF	GER	Sidney Friede (loan return to Hertha BSC)
10	MF	BEL	Selim Amallah (to Standard Liège)
13	DF	GRE	Georgios Galitsios (to Anorthosis Famagusta)
14	FW	NGR	Taiwo Awoniyi (loan return to Liverpool)
18	FW	SEN	Mbaye Leye (retired)
21	MF	BEL	Manuel Benson (loan return to Genk)
23	FW	HAI	Frantzdy Pierrot (to Guingamp)
25	DF	SEN	Christophe Diedhiou (to Sochaux)
27	DF	KOS	Mërgim Vojvoda (to Standard Liège)
99	FW	POR	Idrisa Sambú (loan return to Spartak Moscow)
—	MF	BIH	Mićo Kuzmanović (to Rudar Velenje)
—	FW	BEL	Clément Petit (was on loan to Francs Borains, now released to Tournai)

==== Genk ====
In:

No.	Pos.	Nation	Player
—	FW	BEL	Théo Bongonda (from Zulte Waregem)
—	GK	BEL	Gaëtan Coucke (loan return from Lommel)
—	DF	COL	Carlos Cuesta (from Atlético Nacional)
—	MF	ROU	Ianis Hagi (from Viitorul Constanța)
—	MF	SVK	Patrik Hrošovský (from Viktoria Plzeň)
—	FW	SWE	Benjamin Nygren (from Göteborg)
—	FW	NGR	Stephen Odey (from Zürich)
—	FW	NGR	Paul Onuachu (from Midtjylland)

Out:

No.	Pos.	Nation	Player
9	FW	DEN	Marcus Ingvartsen (to Union Berlin)
14	MF	BEL	Leandro Trossard (to Brighton & Hove Albion)
18	MF	UKR	Ruslan Malinovskyi (to Atalanta)
20	MF	CRO	Ivan Fiolić (on loan to AEK Larnaca)
23	DF	BEL	Rubin Seigers (on loan to Beerschot)
29	MF	BEL	Manuel Benson (was on loan to Excel Mouscron, now sold to Antwerp)
30	GK	BEL	Nordin Jackers (on loan to Waasland-Beveren)
45	DF	GHA	Joseph Aidoo (to Celta Vigo)
93	MF	BEL	Zinho Gano (on loan to Antwerp)
—	DF	CZE	Jakub Brabec (was on loan to Viktoria Plzeň, now sold)
—	MF	NED	Joep Hakkens (was on loan to Lommel, now sold)
—	FW	GRE	Nikos Karelis (was on loan to PAOK, then sold to Brentford)
—	DF	MAR	Amine Khammas (was on loan to Den Bosch, now loaned to Lommel)
—	DF	BIH	Bojan Nastić (was on loan to Oostende, now released)
—	MF	SEN	Ibrahima Seck (was on loan to Zulte Waregem, now sold)
—	FW	BEL	Dante Vanzeir (was on loan to Beerschot, now loaned to Mechelen)

==== Gent ====
In:

No.	Pos.	Nation	Player
—	MF	SUI	Nicky Beloko (on loan from Fiorentina)
—	DF	BEL	Alessio Castro-Montes (from Eupen)
—	FW	BEL	Laurent Depoitre (from Huddersfield Town)
—	FW	JPN	Yuya Kubo (loan return from 1. FC Nürnberg)
—	MF	BEL	Sven Kums (on loan from Anderlecht)
—	DF	SWE	Mikael Lustig (from Celtic)
—	DF	COL	Deiver Machado (loan return from Atlético Nacional)
—	FW	BEL	Dylan Mbayo (from Lokeren)
—	DF	IRI	Milad Mohammadi (from Akhmat Grozny)
—	MF	EGY	Ahmed Mostafa (loan return from Smouha)
—	DF	CMR	Michael Ngadeu-Ngadjui (from Slavia Prague)
—	MF	FRA	Elisha Owusu (from Lyon)
—	FW	SEN	Mamadou Sylla (loan return from Sint-Truiden)
—	MF	SWE	Tesfaldet Tekie (loan return from Östersund)
—	DF	BEL	Jan Van den Bergh (from Beerschot)
—	MF	BEL	Louis Verstraete (loan return from Waasland-Beveren)
—	DF	NGR	Reuben Yem (from Trenčín)

Out:

No.	Pos.	Nation	Player
2	MF	FRA	Arnaud Souquet (to Montpellier)
3	DF	SWE	Eric Smith (on loan to Tromsø)
4	DF	NOR	Sigurd Rosted (to Brøndby)
6	MF	BEL	Birger Verstraete (to 1. FC Köln)
10	FW	NOR	Alexander Sørloth (loan return to Crystal Palace)
20	GK	BEL	Yannick Thoelen (to Mechelen)
27	DF	COL	Anderson Arroyo (loan return to Liverpool)
29	DF	BEL	Thibault De Smet (to Sint-Truiden)
44	MF	NGR	Anderson Esiti (to PAOK)
—	MF	CRO	Franko Andrijašević (was on loan to Waasland-Beveren, now loaned to Rijeka)
—	MF	GEO	Giorgi Beridze (was on loan to Újpest, now loaned to Lokeren)
—	DF	BEL	Siebe Horemans (was on loan to Excelsior, now sold)
—	MF	ISR	Lior Inbrum (was on loan to Beitar Jerusalem, now loaned to Hapoel Tel Aviv)
—	MF	BEL	Elton Kabangu (was on loan to FC Eindhoven, now sold to Willem II)
—	MF	BEL	Aboubakary Koita (was on loan to Kortrijk, now sold to Waasland-Beveren)
—	FW	BEL	Stallone Limbombe (on loan to Giresunspor)
—	DF	BRA	Renato Neto (to Oostende)
—	MF	BEL	Lucas Schoofs (was on loan to NAC Breda, now sold to Heracles Almelo)
—	GK	BEL	Anthony Swolfs (was on loan to Waasland-Beveren, now sold to Telstar)

==== Kortrijk ====
In:

No.	Pos.	Nation	Player
—	MF	NGR	Abdul Jeleel Ajagun (loan return from Omonia)
—	FW	SCO	Fraser Hornby (on loan from Everton)
—	GK	SVK	Adam Jakubech (on loan from Lille)
—	MF	COD	Hervé Kage (loan return from Adana Demirspor)
—	DF	SRB	Vladimir Kovačević (loan return from Sheriff Tiraspol)
—	FW	BEL	Ilombe Mboyo (loan return from Al-Raed)
—	DF	BIH	Nihad Mujakić (loan return from Sarajevo)
—	DF	IRI	Mohammad Naderi (loan return from Persepolis)
—	MF	GHA	Eric Ocansey (from Eupen)
—	MF	COM	Faïz Selemani (from Union SG)
—	DF	BRA	Tuta (on loan from Eintracht Frankfurt)

Out:

No.	Pos.	Nation	Player
2	MF	GHA	Bennard Yao Kumordzi (end of contract)
7	MF	BEL	Aboubakary Koita (loan return to Gent)
9	FW	FRA	Teddy Chevalier (to Valenciennes)
12	GK	BEL	Jarno De Smet (to Beerschot)
17	MF	KOS	Medjon Hoxha (end of contract)
20	FW	URU	Felipe Avenatti (loan return to Bologna)
21	MF	GRE	Charis Charisis (loan return to PAOK)
27	MF	FRA	Idir Ouali (to Hatayspor)
33	GK	POR	Joel Castro Pereira (loan return to Manchester United)

==== Mechelen ====
In:

No.	Pos.	Nation	Player
—	DF	CIV	Mamadou Bagayoko (loan return from Red Star)
—	DF	TTO	Sheldon Bateau (from Sarpsborg)
—	MF	BEL	Geoffry Hairemans (from Antwerp)
—	DF	BFA	Issa Kabore (from Rahimo)
—	FW	GRE	Angelos Kotsopoulos (from Asteras Tripolis)
—	GK	BEL	Yannick Thoelen (from Gent)
—	MF	BEL	Jordi Vanlerberghe (on loan from Club Brugge)
—	FW	BEL	Dante Vanzeir (on loan from Genk)

Out:

No.	Pos.	Nation	Player
4	DF	BEL	Seth De Witte (to Lokeren)
6	DF	COL	Germán Mera (to Atlético Junior)
7	MF	BEL	Tim Matthys (retired)
34	GK	NED	Michael Verrips (to Sheffield United)
—	MF	BEL	Glenn Claes (was on loan to Lommel, now sold to Virton)
—	MF	MAR	Ahmed El Messaoudi (was on loan to Fortuna Sittard, now sold to Groningen)
—	MF	BFA	Abou Ouattara (was on loan to Lille II, now sold)
—	FW	BEL	Jordy Peffer (was on loan to Lyra-Lierse, now sold)
—	DF	BEL	Hannes Smolders (was on loan to Lierse Kempenzonen, now sold)

==== Oostende ====
In:

No.	Pos.	Nation	Player
—	FW	BEL	Ibrahima Bah (loan return from RWDM47)
—	MF	ZAM	Emmanuel Banda (loan return from Béziers)
—	MF	DEN	Andrew Hjulsager (from Celta Vigo)
—	DF	BRA	Renato Neto (from Gent)
—	MF	CRO	Ante Palaversa (on loan from Manchester City)
—	MF	SLO	Nicolas Rajsel (loan return from Roeselare)
—	DF	SEN	Yaya Sané (free agent)
—	FW	GUI	Idrissa Sylla (on loan from Zulte Waregem)
—	DF	ISL	Ari Freyr Skúlason (from Lokeren)
—	MF	VEN	Ronald Vargas (from Newcastle Jets)

Out:

No.	Pos.	Nation	Player
3	DF	BEL	Laurens De Bock (loan return to Leeds United)
14	MF	BEL	Aristote Nkaka (loan return to Anderlecht)
15	DF	BIH	Bojan Nastić (loan return to Genk)
17	MF	BEL	Jordi Vanlerberghe (loan return to Club Brugge)
18	FW	BEL	Tom De Sutter (to Knokke)
19	DF	NOR	Amin Nouri (loan return to Vålerenga)
30	GK	BEL	Thomas De Bie (to Tubize)
33	DF	MNE	Žarko Tomašević (to Astana)
43	MF	BEL	Sander Coopman (to Antwerp)
—	DF	BEL	Rocky Bushiri (was on loan to Eupen, now sold to Norwich City)

==== Sint-Truiden ====
In:

No.	Pos.	Nation	Player
—	FW	ARG	Facundo Colidio (on loan from Inter Milan)
—	MF	ARG	Santiago Colombatto (on loan from Cagliari)
—	FW	VIE	Nguyễn Công Phượng (on loan from Hoang Anh Gia Lai)
—	MF	BEL	Steve De Ridder (from Lokeren)
—	DF	BEL	Thibault De Smet (from Gent)
—	MF	USA	Chris Durkin (on loan from D.C. United)
—	FW	JPN	Tatsuya Ito (on loan from Hamburger SV)
—	MF	GUI	Mory Konaté (from Borussia Dortmund II)
—	MF	KOR	Seung-woo Lee (from Hellas Verona)
—	MF	BRA	Jhonny Lucas (from Paraná)
—	GK	JPN	Daniel Schmidt (from Vegalta Sendai)
—	FW	BRA	Alan Goncalves Sousa (on loan from Vejle)
—	FW	JPN	Yuma Suzuki (from Kashima Antlers)
—	FW	BEL	Mathieu Troonbeeckx (from Heist)

Out:

No.	Pos.	Nation	Player
3	DF	JPN	Takehiro Tomiyasu (to Bologna)
5	MF	BEL	Alexis De Sart (to Antwerp)
8	MF	JPN	Takahiro Sekine (loan return to FC Ingolstadt 04)
15	MF	JPN	Daichi Kamada (loan return to Eintracht Frankfurt)
16	DF	BRA	Thallyson (to Guarani)
18	FW	JPN	Kosuke Kinoshita (to Stabæk)
19	MF	ESP	Cristian Ceballos (contract terminated)
21	GK	BEL	Lucas Pirard (to Waasland-Beveren)
23	MF	NED	Rai Vloet (to Excelsior)
24	FW	SEN	Mamadou Sylla (loan return to Gent)
27	DF	SLO	Erik Gliha (end of contract)
33	MF	JPN	Wataru Endo (on loan to VfB Stuttgart)
—	DF	FRA	Fabien Antunes (was on loan to Westerlo, now sold)

==== Standard Liège ====
In:

No.	Pos.	Nation	Player
—	MF	BEL	Selim Amallah (from Excel Mouscron)
—	FW	URU	Felipe Avenatti (from Bologna)
—	MF	MNE	Aleksandar Boljević (from Waasland-Beveren)
—	MF	COL	Darío Castro (on loan from Santa Fe)
—	FW	CRO	Duje Čop (loan return from Valladolid)
—	MF	ROU	Denis Drăguș (from Viitorul Constanța)
—	DF	BEL	Noë Dussenne (from Excel Mouscron)
—	MF	FRA	Nicolas Gavory (from Utrecht)
—	MF	BEL	Anthony Limbombe (on loan from Nantes)
—	GK	SRB	Vanja Milinković-Savić (on loan from Torino)
—	FW	BEL	Obbi Oularé (was on loan from Watford, now bought)
—	DF	MLI	Hady Sangaré (was on loan from JMG Bamako, now bought)
—	DF	BEL	Zinho Vanheusden (was on loan from Inter Milan, now bought)
—	DF	KOS	Mërgim Vojvoda (from Excel Mouscron)

Out:

No.	Pos.	Nation	Player
6	DF	SRB	Miloš Kosanović (to Al Jazira)
11	MF	CRO	Alen Halilović (loan return to Milan)
13	GK	MEX	Guillermo Ochoa (to América)
18	MF	ROU	Răzvan Marin (to Ajax)
19	MF	MLI	Moussa Djenepo (to Southampton)
—	MF	NGR	Uche Henry Agbo (was on loan to Rayo Vallecano, now loaned to Braga)
—	MF	COD	William Balikwisha (on loan to Cercle Brugge)
—	MF	BRA	Carlinhos (was on loan to Guarani, now loaned to Vitória de Setúbal)
—	MF	BEL	Jérôme Deom (was on loan to MVV, now sold)
—	MF	BEL	Natanaël Frenoy (on loan to MVV, now sold)
—	MF	UKR	Valeriy Luchkevych (was on loan to Oleksandriya, now sold)
—	MF	COD	Christian Luyindama (was on loan to Galatasaray, now sold)
—	FW	BEL	Ryan Mmaee (was on loan to AGF, then end of contract)
—	GK	BEL	Vincent Rousseau (to Virton)
—	MF	ALB	Lindon Selahi (to Twente)

==== Waasland-Beveren ====
In:

No.	Pos.	Nation	Player
—	MF	GHA	Thomas Agyepong (on loan from Manchester City)
—	FW	CIV	Olivier Dhauholou (on loan from Anderlecht)
—	FW	GRE	Fiorin Durmishaj (on loan from Olympiacos)
—	MF	BEL	Xian Emmers (on loan from Inter Milan)
—	GK	BEL	Brent Gabriël (from Club Brugge)
—	MF	BEL	Daan Heymans (loan return from Lommel)
—	GK	BEL	Nordin Jackers (on loan from Genk)
—	MF	BEL	Aboubakary Koita (from Gent)
—	GK	BEL	Lucas Pirard (from Sint-Truiden)
—	MF	COD	Aaron Tshibola (from Aston Villa)
—	MF	BEL	Matthias Verreth (from PSV Eindhoven)
—	DF	MNE	Andrija Vukčević (from Spartak Subotica)
—	MF	GER	Andreas Wiegel (from MSV Duisburg)

Out:

No.	Pos.	Nation	Player
1	GK	BEL	Anthony Swolfs (loan return to Gent)
3	DF	NED	Milan Massop (to Silkeborg)
5	MF	CRO	Karlo Lulić (on loan to Slaven Belupo)
7	MF	MNE	Aleksandar Boljević (to Standard Liège)
9	MF	ITA	Francesco Forte (on loan to Juve Stabia)
13	MF	BEL	Louis Verstraete (loan return to Gent)
15	FW	BEL	Floriano Vanzo (to Virton)
22	MF	GHA	Opoku Ampomah (to Fortuna Düsseldorf)
31	MF	CRO	Franko Andrijašević (loan return to Gent)
33	GK	BEL	Davy Roef (loan return to Anderlecht)
39	FW	GRE	Apostolos Vellios (loan return to Nottingham Forest)
89	GK	BEL	Kevin Debaty (released)
—	DF	ENG	Oscar Threlkeld (was on loan to Plymouth Argyle, now released to Salford City)
—	DF	BEL	Senne Van Dooren (was on loan to Hoogstraten, now sold)

==== Zulte-Waregem ====
In:

No.	Pos.	Nation	Player
—	FW	BDI	Saido Berahino (from Stoke City)
—	FW	BEL	Gianni Bruno (from Cercle Brugge)
—	DF	BEL	Olivier Deschacht (from Lokeren)
—	MF	MEX	Omar Govea (from Porto B)
—	DF	ENG	Cameron Humphreys (from Manchester City)
—	FW	GRE	Nikos Kenourgios (from Sparti)
—	FW	CAN	Cyle Larin (on loan from Beşiktaş)
—	MF	GHA	Gideon Mensah (on loan from Red Bull Salzburg)
—	FW	SUI	Dimitri Oberlin (on loan from Basel)
—	MF	SEN	Ibrahima Seck (was on loan from Genk, now bought)
—	MF	FRA	Abdoulaye Sissako (from Châteauroux)
—	DF	AUS	George Timotheou (from Schalke 04)
—	MF	GEO	Luka Zarandia (from Arka Gdynia)

Out:

No.	Pos.	Nation	Player
4	DF	BEL	Michaël Heylen (to Emmen)
7	MF	BEL	Thomas Buffel (retired)
8	MF	NED	Hicham Faik (to Heerenveen)
9	FW	TUN	Hamdi Harbaoui (to Al-Arabi)
10	FW	BEL	Théo Bongonda (to Genk)
11	MF	BEL	Nill De Pauw (to Çaykur Rizespor)
12	FW	CIV	Chris Bedia (loan return to Charleroi)
22	MF	FRA	Florian Tardieu (to Troyes)
23	DF	BEL	Bryan Verboom (to RWDM47)
26	MF	BEL	Stef Peeters (loan return to Caen)
40	FW	GUI	Idrissa Sylla (on loan to Oostende)
—	MF	NGR	Aliko Bala (was on loan to Hapoel Marmorek, then released)
—	MF	BEL	Gertjan De Mets (was on loan to Beerschot Wilrijk, now retired)
—	DF	NGR	Kingsley Madu (was on loan to Roeselare, now sold to OB)
—	FW	NED	Robert Mühren (was on loan to NAC Breda, now loaned to Cambuur)
—	MF	FIN	Urho Nissilä (on loan to MVV Maastricht)
—	MF	ISR	Ben Reichert (was on loan to Ashdod, then released)
—	MF	BEL	Anass Zaroury (to Lommel)

=== Belgian First Division B teams ===
==== Beerschot ====
In:

No.	Pos.	Nation	Player
—	GK	BEL	Jarno De Smet (from Kortrijk)
—	DF	ALG	Réda Halaïmia (from MC Oran)
—	MF	AUT	Raphael Holzhauser (from Grasshoppers Zürich)
—	FW	CGO	Prince Ibara (from Alger)
—	FW	CGO	Dylan Saint-Louis (from Paris FC)
—	MF	BEL	Ryan Sanusi (from Grenoble)
—	DF	BEL	Rubin Seigers (on loan from Genk)
—	MF	KAZ	Yan Vorogovskiy (from Kairat)

Out:

No.	Pos.	Nation	Player
2	DF	BEL	Jan Van den Bergh (to Gent)
7	MF	BEL	Tom Van Hyfte (to OH Leuven)
8	FW	MKD	Emil Abaz (to Borec)
13	FW	BEL	Dante Vanzeir (loan return to Genk)
19	MF	BEL	Mohamed Messoudi (end of contract)
20	MF	SWE	Diego Montiel (to Vejle)
21	MF	BEL	Gertjan De Mets (was on loan from Zulte Waregem, now retired)
27	FW	AUT	Erwin Hoffer (to Admira Wacker)
28	DF	BEL	Jimmy De Jonghe (to Lokeren)
99	FW	AUT	Rubin Okotie (end of contract)
—	DF	TUR	Gökhan Kardeş (was on loan to Afjet Afyonspor, now sold to BB Erzurumspor)
—	MF	BEL	Dani Wilms (was on loan to Rupel Boom, now sold to City Pirates)

==== Lokeren ====
In:

No.	Pos.	Nation	Player
—	MF	JPN	Jun Amano (from Yokohama F. Marinos)
—	MF	GEO	Giorgi Beridze (on loan from Gent)
—	GK	BEL	Théo Defourny (from Tubize)
—	DF	BEL	Jimmy De Jonghe (from Beerschot)
—	DF	BEL	Seth De Witte (from Mechelen)
—	MF	MLI	Abdoulaye Diaby (on loan from Antwerp)
—	MF	SEN	Abdou Diakhaté (on loan from Parma)
—	FW	BIH	Anel Hajrić (from Radomlje)
—	DF	JPN	Ryuta Koike (from Kashiwa Reysol)
—	FW	ESP	Fran Navarro (on loan from Valencia Mestalla)
—	MF	CIV	Lamine N'dao (from ASEC Mimosas)
—	DF	CGO	Francis N'Ganga (from Ermis Aradippou)
—	FW	BEL	Thomas Nzinga (from Londerzeel)
—	FW	ITA	Said Ahmed Said (on loan from Rio Ave)
—	FW	BEL	Bob Straetman (loan return from Virton)
—	DF	BEL	Jelle Van Damme (from Antwerp)

Out:

No.	Pos.	Nation	Player
3	DF	BEL	Olivier Deschacht (to Zulte Waregem)
6	DF	ISL	Ari Freyr Skúlason (to Oostende)
10	MF	ECU	José Cevallos (on loan to Portimonense)
11	FW	ZIM	Knowledge Musona (loan return to Anderlecht)
12	GK	BEL	Ortwin De Wolf (to Eupen)
14	MF	ALG	Mehdi Terki (to Xanthi)
15	FW	BEL	Dylan Mbayo (to Gent)
18	DF	SEN	Bambo Diaby (to Barnsley)
21	MF	SRB	Marko Mirić (to Borac Banja Luka)
22	MF	BEL	Steve De Ridder (to Sint-Truiden)
37	FW	CZE	Jakub Řezníček (to Teplice)
77	FW	BLR	Anton Saroka (to BATE Borisov)
—	MF	NED	Luciano Slagveer (was on loan to Emmen, now sold)
—	MF	CRO	Mario Tičinović (to Zrinjski Mostar)

==== Lommel ====
In:

No.	Pos.	Nation	Player
—	GK	NED	Jesse Bertrams (from ASV Geel)
—	FW	BEL	Rik De Kuyffer (from Club Brugge)
—	MF	NED	Joep Hakkens (was on loan from Genk, now bought)
—	DF	BEL	Jonathan Hendrickx (from Breiðablik)
—	MF	NED	Ricardo Ippel (from MVV)
—	MF	GAM	Alieu Jallow (from Superstars Academy)
—	DF	MAR	Amine Khammas (on loan from Genk)
—	FW	SLO	Mitja Krizan (from Bravo)
—	DF	GAM	Salif Kujabi (from Superstars Academy)
—	FW	AUT	Armin Mujakic (from Atromitos)
—	FW	BEL	Arne Naudts (from SpVgg Unterhaching)
—	MF	GAM	Abdoulie Sanyang (from Superstars Academy)
—	DF	BEL	Brendan Schoonbaert (on loan from Club Brugge)
—	DF	NED	Tim Siekman (from Emmen)
—	GK	LTU	Tomas Švedkauskas (from Riteriai)
—	MF	ISL	Kolbeinn Þórðarson (from Breiðablik)
—	MF	GEO	Beka Vachiberadze (from FK RFS)
—	MF	BEL	Anass Zaroury (from Zulte Waregem)

Out:

No.	Pos.	Nation	Player
1	GK	BEL	Gaëtan Coucke (loan return to Genk)
2	DF	BEL	Soufiane El Banouhi (loan return to Union SG)
9	FW	POR	Leonardo Miramar Rocha (to Eupen)
10	MF	BEL	Geert Berben (to Patro Eisden Maasmechelen)
15	DF	BEL	Wesley Vanbelle (to Roeselare)
16	FW	BEL	Sam Valcke (to Dender EH)
17	MF	BEL	Thomas Azevedo (to Patro Eisden Maasmechelen)
18	FW	CUW	Romero Regales (end of contract)
19	MF	BEL	Daan Heymans (loan return to Waasland-Beveren)
22	DF	BEL	Sebastiaan De Wilde (released)
24	MF	BEL	Glenn Claes (loan return to Mechelen)
25	GK	BEL	Glenn Daniëls (end of contract)
26	GK	BEL	Dieter Creemers (to Patro Eisden Maasmechelen)
—	MF	BEL	Jentl Gaethofs (was on loan to Dessel Sport, now sold)

==== OH Leuven ====
In:

No.	Pos.	Nation	Player
5	DF	BEL	Pierre-Yves Ngawa (from Perugia)
8	MF	BEL	Tom Van Hyfte (from Beerschot)
10	MF	FRA	Xavier Mercier (from Cercle Brugge)
14	MF	GHA	Kamal Sowah (again on loan from Leicester City)
15	DF	BFA	Dylan Ouédraogo (from Apollon Limassol)
16	GK	RSA	Darren Keet (from Bidvest Wits)
18	FW	BEL	Jo Gilis (loan return from Eendracht Aalst)
27	DF	BEL	Jordy Gillekens (loan return from Fiorentina)
30	FW	SLO	Milan Tučić (from Rudar Velenje)
32	FW	BEL	Daan Vekemans (loan return from Eendracht Aalst)
43	FW	FRA	Jérémy Perbet (on loan from Charleroi)
99	MF	CIV	Aboubakar Keita (was already on loan from Copenhagen, now bought)
—	FW	NED	Sam Hendriks (loan return from Cambuur)

Out:

No.	Pos.	Nation	Player
1	GK	BEL	Nick Gillekens (end of contract)
2	DF	BEL	Dimitri Daeseleire (to Rupel Boom)
5	DF	ENG	Elliott Moore (loan return to Leicester City)
10	FW	ENG	George Hirst (to Leicester City)
11	MF	BEL	Joeri Dequevy (to RWDM47)
17	MF	FRA	Julien Gorius (end of contract)
18	MF	BEL	Jellert van Landschoot (loan return to Club Brugge)
20	FW	SEN	Simon Diedhiou (end of contract)
23	FW	MKD	Jovan Kostovski (to Ethnikos Achna)
24	MF	BEL	Jarno Libert (to RWDM47)
25	MF	BEL	Jenthe Mertens (to Go Ahead Eagles)
27	MF	FRA	Redouane Kerrouche (to Aves)
28	MF	BEL	Koen Persoons (to Knokke)
30	MF	POL	Bartosz Kapustka (loan return to Leicester City)
34	DF	BEL	Ahmed Touba (loan return to Club Brugge)
—	MF	BEL	Leo Njengo (was on loan to Heist, now released to Visé)

==== Roeselare ====
In:

No.	Pos.	Nation	Player
—	MF	CGO	Yhoan Andzouana (from Girona)
—	MF	BRA	Renan Areias (from Corinthians)
—	MF	VEN	Abel Alejandro Caputo (from Levante)
—	MF	BRA	Rodrigo Bassani da Cruz (from Ituano)
—	MF	USA	Ethan Bryant (from San Antonio)
—	MF	BRA	Rodrigo Fumaça (from Ituano)
—	DF	ENG	Tom Holmes (on loan from Reading)
—	DF	NED	Gregory Kuisch (on loan from PSV Eindhoven)
—	MF	BIH	Sanjin Lelić (from FK Sarajevo)
—	FW	BEL	Jens Naessens (from Westerlo)
—	MF	FRA	Amir Nouri (from Béziers)
—	DF	BRA	Rincón (from Laval)
—	MF	BEL	Nicolas Rommens (from Westerlo)
—	MF	BRA	Alyson Santos Silva (from São Bernardo)
—	DF	FRA	Harouna Sy (from Red Star)
—	MF	BRA	Marco Túlio (on loan from Sporting CP)
—	DF	BEL	Wesley Vanbelle (from Lommel)
—	DF	BEL	Jonathan Vervoort (from Dender EH)
—	DF	BEL	Siemen Voet (on loan from Club Brugge)

Out:

No.	Pos.	Nation	Player
2	MF	BEL	Shun Ballegeer (to Torhout)
3	DF	TUR	Fazlı Kocabaş (to Virton)
4	DF	BEL	Kjetil Borry (to Dender EH)
5	DF	FRA	Baptiste Schmisser (to Torhout)
6	MF	BEL	Thibaut Van Acker (end of contract)
7	MF	BEL	Ben Yagan (end of contract)
9	FW	CUW	Gino van Kessel (to Spartak Trnava)
10	MF	BEL	Stijn De Smet (to Zwevezele)
16	DF	BEL	Arthur Devos (on loan to Mandel United)
17	DF	SUR	Danzell Gravenberch (loan return to Reading)
18	DF	CGO	Maël Lépicier (end of contract)
19	FW	BEL	Emile Samyn (on loan to Lierse Kempenzonen)
20	FW	BEL	Mohammed Aoulad (released)
21	DF	NGR	Kingsley Madu (loan return to Zulte Waregem)
22	MF	SLO	Nicolas Rajsel (loan return to Oostende)
25	FW	BEL	Ibrahim Kargbo Jr. (on loan to Lierse Kempenzonen)
27	DF	BEL	François Kompany (end of contract)
28	MF	BEL	Guy Dufour (to Dessel Sport)
33	DF	NED	Darren Sidoel (loan return to Reading)
37	FW	NED	Arsenio Valpoort (to Excelsior)
—	MF	BEL	Robbe Bakelandt (on loan to Sint-Eloois-Winkel)
—	FW	BIH	Marko Maletić (was on loan to Paris FC, now sold)

==== Union SG ====
In:

No.	Pos.	Nation	Player
—	MF	NED	Soufyan Ahannach (on loan from Brighton & Hove Albion)
—	DF	DEN	Jonas Bager (from Randers)
—	FW	FRA	Nils Bouekou (loan return from RWDM47)
—	DF	BEL	Soufiane El Banouhi (loan return from Lommel)
—	FW	NOR	Sigurd Hauso Haugen (from Sogndal)
—	MF	SLO	Nik Lorbek (from Mura)
—	MF	DEN	Casper Nielsen (from OB)
—	FW	VEN	Antonio Romero (on loan from Zamora)
—	DF	BEL	Siebe Van der Heyden (from FC Eindhoven)
—	MF	USA	Isaiah Young (on loan from Werder Bremen II)

Out:

No.	Pos.	Nation	Player
4	DF	ESP	Carlos David (to Cartagena)
6	MF	POR	Steven Pinto-Borges (to Annecy)
8	MF	GER	Max Besuschkow (loan return to Eintracht Frankfurt)
14	MF	ESP	Urtzi Iriondo (to Barakaldo)
16	MF	BEL	Charles Morren (to F91 Dudelange)
18	FW	FRA	Youssouf Niakaté (to Al-Wehda Club)
19	FW	RSA	Percy Tau (loan return to Brighton & Hove Albion)
21	MF	GER	Adrian Beck (on loan to Hamilton Academical)
23	DF	SRB	Miloš Stamenković (to Irtysh Pavlodar)
70	MF	COM	Faïz Selemani (to Kortrijk)

==== Virton ====
In:

No.	Pos.	Nation	Player
—	FW	ALG	Marwane Benamra (from Mondorf-les-Bains)
—	MF	CRO	Filip Bojic (from Union Titus Pétange)
—	FW	ALG	Idir Boutrif (from Sampdoria)
—	MF	BEL	Glenn Claes (from Mechelen)
—	MF	FRA	Clément Couturier (from F91 Dudelange)
—	DF	MLI	Abdoul Karim Danté (from Anderlecht)
—	FW	MAR	Samir Hadji (from Fola Esch)
—	MF	BUL	Edisson Jordanov (from F91 Dudelange)
—	MF	MAR	Anouar Kali (on loan from NAC Breda)
—	DF	TUR	Fazlı Kocabaş (from Roeselare)
—	MF	FRA	Loïc Lapoussin (from Red Star)
—	MF	GER	Steven Lewerenz (from 1. FC Magdeburg)
—	DF	LUX	Kevin Malget (from F91 Dudelange)
—	DF	FRA	Jerry Prempeh (from F91 Dudelange)
—	FW	FRA	Alexandre Ramalingom (from Béziers)
—	GK	BEL	Vincent Rousseau (from Standard Liège)
—	FW	LUX	Yannick Schaus (from Bayer Leverkusen)
—	MF	ANG	Stélvio (from F91 Dudelange)
—	DF	FRA	Salimo Sylla (from Xanthi)
—	MF	FRA	Vinni Triboulet (on loan from Nancy)
—	FW	LUX	David Turpel (from F91 Dudelange)
—	FW	BEL	Floriano Vanzo (from Waasland-Beveren)

Out:

No.	Pos.	Nation	Player
2	MF	BEL	Florent Devresse (to Swift Hesperange)
4	FW	BIH	Adnan Zahirović (end of contract)
5	MF	BEL	Luca Napoleone (to RWDM47)
7	MF	FRA	Jérémy Grain (to Lyon-Duchère)
8	FW	LUX	Aurélien Joachim (end of contract)
9	FW	BEL	Bob Straetman (loan return to Lokeren)
12	DF	BEL	Thibaut Lesquoy (to F91 Dudelange)
13	GK	ESP	Adrián Murcia (end of contract)
14	MF	BEL	Samuel Fabris (on loan to Eendracht Aalst)
15	DF	SEN	Pape M'Bow (to Le Puy)
17	MF	BEL	Julien Vercauteren (to RWDM47)
22	DF	FRA	Lamine Fall (to Swift Hesperange)
28	MF	BEL	Benjamin Schmit (to RFC Liège)
29	MF	FRA	Mohamed Fadhloun (to Lyon-Duchère)
31	MF	BEL	Alessandro Cordaro (to Swift Hesperange)
72	MF	SEN	Salif Dramé (loan return to F91 Dudelange)
—	MF	GER	Maximilian Jansen (signed from SV Sandhausen, then released)
—	GK	LUX	Tim Kips (signed from 1. FC Magdeburg, then loaned to F91 Dudelange)
—	MF	FRA	Corenthyn Lavie (was on loan to Hostert, now sold to F91 Dudelange)
—	DF	FRA	Paul Léonard (was on loan to SAS Épinal, now sold)
—	DF	ARG	Eros Medaglia (end of contract)
—	MF	FRA	Marcel Mimoun (end of contract)

==== Westerlo ====
In:

No.	Pos.	Nation	Player
—	DF	FRA	Fabien Antunes (was on loan from Sint-Truiden, now bought)
—	GK	BEL	Pieter Caubergh (loan return from ASV Geel)
—	MF	TUR	Recep Gül (on loan from Galatasaray)
—	MF	FRA	Kader Keita (from Lille)
—	DF	CIV	Souleymane Kone (from Djurgården)
—	GK	TUR	Berke Özer (on loan from Fenerbahçe)
—	DF	DEN	Christoffer Remmer (from Molde)
—	FW	ANG	Igor Vetokele (from Charlton Athletic)

Out:

No.	Pos.	Nation	Player
4	DF	BEL	Wouter Corstjens (on loan to Patro Eisden Maasmechelen)
11	FW	BEL	Jens Naessens (to Roeselare)
16	MF	BEL	Alessio Alessandro (end of contract)
24	MF	BEL	Nicolas Rommens (to Roeselare)
26	GK	BEL	Yannick Verbist (on loan to Heist)
42	DF	GAB	Randal Oto'o (end of contract)
75	MF	TUN	Nader Ghandri (loan return to Antwerp)
—	DF	BEL	Simon Bammens (was on loan to Tessenderlo, now sold)
—	FW	GHA	Bernardinho (was on loan to ASV Geel, now loaned to Heist)
—	MF	BEL	Jeroen Goor (was on loan to Wijgmaal, now sold)
—	DF	BEL	Michiel Jaeken (was on loan to Dessel Sport, now sold to Duffel)
—	MF	BEL	Andy Lokando (was on loan to Francs Borains, now released to Tubize)
—	MF	BEL	Cédric Mateso (on loan to Heist)
—	FW	BEL	Gillian Vaesen (was on loan to Bocholt, now sold to Hades)
—	MF	BEL	Cédric Vangeel (was on loan to Hasselt, now sold to Hades)
—	DF	BEL	Yentl Van Genechten (on loan to Tessenderlo)
