= N'Dao =

N'Dao is a surname. Notable people with the surname include:

- Lamine N'dao (born 1993), Ivorian footballer
- Momar N'Dao (born 1949), Senegalese sprinter
