= Medjon Hoxha =

Kosovo-Albanian footballer

Personal information
- Date of birth: 27 July 1999 (age 27)
- Place of birth: Hemer, Germany
- Height: 1.80 m (5 ft 11 in)
- Position: Attacking midfielder

Youth career
- 2004–2017: Kortrijk

Senior career*
Years	Team	Apps	(Gls)
2017–2019	Kortrijk	4	(1)
2020	Feronikeli	4	(0)
2023–2024	KVK Westhoek	10	(0)
- * Club domestic league appearances and goals as of 19:50, 21 February 2021 (UTC)

Medjon Hoxha (born 27 July 1999) is a Kosovan professional footballer who plays as an attacking midfielder.

== Club career ==
=== Kortrijk ===
Hoxha is the youth product of Kortrijk since 2004. On 7 April 2017, he signed his first professional contract with Belgian First Division A side Kortrijk, on a two-year contract. On 6 May 2017, Hoxha made his debut as professional footballer in a 0–3 home defeat against Roeselare after coming on as a substitute at 84th minute in place of Stijn De Smet.

=== Feronikeli ===
On 29 December 2019, Hoxha joined Football Superleague of Kosovo side Feronikeli. On 12 February 2020, he made his debut with Feronikeli in the quarter-final of 2019–20 Kosovar Cup against Liria after being named in the starting line-up.

== International career ==
On 30 August 2018, Hoxha received a call-up from Kosovo U21 for a 2019 UEFA European Under-21 Championship qualification match against Republic of Ireland U21.
