= Olivier Dhauholou =

Ivorian professional footballer

Personal information
- Full name: Ciryack Olivier Dhauholou
- Date of birth: 6 June 1997 (age 29)
- Place of birth: Ivory Coast
- Height: 1.82 m (6 ft 0 in)
- Position: Forward

Youth career
- Anderlecht

Senior career*
Years	Team	Apps	(Gls)
2019–2020	Anderlecht	0	(0)
2019–2020	→ Waasland-Beveren (loan)	1	(0)
- * Club domestic league appearances and goals as of 26 December 2019

Ciryack Olivier Dhauholou (born 6 June 1997) is an Ivorian professional footballer who plays as a forward.

== Professional career ==
On 3 September 2019, Dhauholou signed with Waasland-Beveren, on loan from Anderlecht. Dhauholou made his professional debut for Waasland-Beveren in a 4-0 Belgian First Division A loss to Royal Antwerp F.C. on 6 December 2019.
