= Thomas Wildemeersch =

Belgian footballer

Personal information
- Date of birth: 18 January 2000 (age 26)
- Place of birth: Belgium
- Position: Midfielder

Team information
- Current team: CS Entité Manageoise
- Number: 88

Youth career
- 2006–2019: Sporting Charleroi

Senior career*
Years	Team	Apps	(Gls)
2019–2020	Sporting Charleroi	3	(0)
2019–2020	→ Francs Borains (loan)	15	(1)
2020–2022	RAAL La Louvière	14	(2)
2022–2024	RAEC Mons		
2023–2024	→ CS Entité Manageoise (loan)		
2024–	CS Entité Manageoise	32	(11)
- * Club domestic league appearances and goals as of 16 January 2026

Thomas Wildemeersch (born 18 January 2000) is a Belgian professional footballer who plays as a midfielder for CS Entité Manageoise.

== Career ==
Wildemeersch joined R. Charleroi S.C. as a U7 player. He went through all the youth ranks of the club and made his official debut for the first team on 17 March 2019.

On 8 August 2019, Wildemeersch was loaned out to Francs Borains for the 2019–20 season.

At the end of the 2019–20 season, he left Charleroi. He then signed with RAAL La Louvière on 20 July 2020.
