= Glenn Daniëls =

Belgian soccer player

Personal information
- Date of birth: 30 January 1994 (age 32)
- Place of birth: Belgium
- Position: Goalkeeper

Senior career*
Years	Team	Apps	(Gls)
	Birmingham City F.C.	0	(0)
201x-2013	Celtic F.C.	0	(0)
2012-2013	Partick Thistle F.C.→(loan)	1	(0)
2013-2016	Fortuna Sittard	1	(0)
2016-2017	Sporting Hasselt	17	(0)
2017-2019	Lommel S.K.	2	(0)
- * Club domestic league appearances and goals

Glenn Daniels (born 30 January 1994 in Belgium) is a Belgian footballer who is last known to have played for Lommel S.K. in his home country.

== Career ==
Daniels started his senior career with Birmingham City. In 2012, he signed for Partick Thistle in the Scottish Championship, where he made one appearance and scored zero goals. After that, he played for Dutch club Fortuna Sittard and Belgian clubs Sporting Hasselt and Lommel S.K. before retiring.
