= Tim Kips =

Luxembourgish footballer (born 2000)

Personal information
- Full name: Tim Roel Kips
- Date of birth: 1 November 2000 (age 26)
- Place of birth: Ettelbruck, Luxembourg
- Height: 1.88 m (6 ft 2 in)
- Position: Goalkeeper

Team information
- Current team: 1. FC Phönix Lübeck
- Number: 1

Youth career
- –2017: FC Etzella
- 2017–2018: Eintracht Trier
- 2018–2019: 1. FC Magdeburg

Senior career*
Years	Team	Apps	(Gls)
2016–2017	FC Etzella	1	(0)
2019	1. FC Magdeburg	0	(0)
2019–2020	Virton	0	(0)
2019–2020	→ F91 Dudelange (loan)	2	(0)
2010–2021	F91 Dudelange	24	(0)
2021–2025	Erzgebirge Aue	2	(0)
2022–2023	→ Rot-Weiß Koblenz (loan)	21	(0)
2025–	1. FC Phönix Lübeck	43	(0)

International career
2015–2016	Luxembourg U17	4	(0)
2017	Luxembourg U19	2	(0)
2019–2022	Luxembourg U21	5	(0)
- * Club domestic league appearances and goals as of 22 September 2026

Tim Roel Kips (born 1 November 2000) is a Luxembourgish footballer who plays as a goalkeeper for German Regionalliga club 1. FC Phönix Lübeck.

== Early life ==
Kips was born in Ettelbruck, Luxembourg.

== Club career ==
Kips started his career at FC Etzella Ettelbrück, where he played up to U17 level. On March 19, 2017, he made his first senior appearance on match day 18 of Luxembourg Division of Honour, Luxembourg's 2nd division. He played the entire 90 minutes in the 3–3 draw at home against Union Mertert-Wasserbillig.

In the summer 2017, Kips moved to Germany, signing for Eintracht Trier, where he started the clubs U19 team. He later had a trial with 1. FC Magdeburg, before joining the club permanently in the summer of 2018. In January 2019, he was promoted to the club's first team squad as third goalkeeper.

Kips moved to R.E. Virton in Belgium in June 2019, where he signed a three-year contract. They then immediately loaned him out to F91 Dudelange for the 2019–20 season. Kips helped the club qualify for the group stage of the 2019–20 UEFA Europa League. He was signed permanently for the 2020–21 season and made 23 league appearances.

Ahead of the 2021/22 season, Kips moved to FC Erzgebirge Aue in the 2. Bundesliga, where he was the third goalkeeper behind Martin Männel and Philipp Klewin. In the summer of 2022, with FC Erzgebirge Aue relegated to the 3. Liga, he moved on loan to FC Rot-Weiß Koblenz in the fourth-tier Regionalliga Südwest. In the final third of the season, the rivals came out on top - despite an interim suspension following a red card. At the end of the season, the club was relegated second last and Kips returned to Erzgebirge Aue at the end of his loan period.

In the summer of 2025, Kips returned to Germany, joining 1. FC Phönix Lübeck in the Regionalliga Nord. The transfer was confirmed on 3 July 2025, with Kips arriving from Erzgebirge Aue, where he had made two appearances in the 3. Liga. He quickly established himself as the club's first-choice goalkeeper, and by November 2025 he had already recorded nine clean sheets in the league.
