= Hannes Smolders =

Belgian footballer (born 1998)

Personal information
- Date of birth: 24 February 1998 (age 28)
- Place of birth: Lier, Belgium
- Height: 1.89 m (6 ft 2 1/2 in)
- Position: Centre-back

Team information
- Current team: Dessel Sport
- Number: 24

Youth career
- –2015: Lierse
- 2015–2017: Mechelen

Senior career*
| Years | Team | Apps | (Gls) |
| 2017–2019 | Mechelen | 3 | (0) |
| 2019 | → Lierse (loan) | 15 | (2) |
| 2019–2021 | Lierse | 23 | (0) |
| 2021–2022 | Westerlo | 0 | (0) |
| 2021–2022 | → Houtvenne (loan) | 25 | (0) |
| 2022– | Dessel Sport | 121 | (16) |
- * Club domestic league appearances and goals as of 3 May 2026

Hannes Smolders (born 24 February 1998) is a Belgian footballer who plays as a centre-back for Dessel Sport.

== Club career ==
Hannes Smolders started his career with KV Mechelen. Smolders re-joined Lierse on 1 January 2019 on a loan deal, that was confirmed already on 7 December 2018.

In the summer of 2022, Smolders signed a two-year contract with Dessel Sport.
