= Mathieu Troonbeeckx =

Belgian footballer

Personal information
- Date of birth: 16 February 1998 (age 28)
- Place of birth: Belgium
- Positions: Right winger; right-back

Team information
- Current team: Dessel Sport
- Number: 17

Senior career*
Years	Team	Apps	(Gls)
2016–2019	Heist	83	(12)
2019–2020	Sint-Truiden	3	(0)
2020–2021	Lierse	17	(0)
2021–2025	Heist	114	(30)
2025–	Dessel Sport	29	(6)
- * Club domestic league appearances and goals as of 3 May 2026

Mathieu Troonbeeckx (born 16 February 1998) is a Belgian professional footballer who plays as a winger for Dessel Sport.

== Club career ==
On 20 March 2021, he agreed on a return to Heist.
