= Alyson (footballer, born February 1996) =

Brazilian footballer

Personal information
- Full name: Alyson Santos Silva
- Date of birth: 20 February 1996 (age 30)
- Place of birth: São Paulo, Brazil
- Height: 1.74 m (5 ft 9 in)
- Position: Midfielder

Team information
- Current team: EC São Bernardo

Youth career
- –2016: São Bernardo
- 2016: → Palmeiras (loan)

Senior career*
Years	Team	Apps	(Gls)
2015–2019	São Bernardo	0	(0)
2017–2018	→ Boa Esporte (loan)	39	(1)
2019	→ Volta Redonda (loan)	0	(0)
2019–2020	Roeselare	0	(0)
2020	Confiança	17	(1)
2021–	EC São Bernardo	5	(0)
- * Club domestic league appearances and goals as of 14:44, 1 February 2020 (UTC)

Alyson Santos Silva (born 20 February 1996), commonly known as Alyson, is a Brazilian footballer who currently plays as a midfielder for EC São Bernardo.

== Career statistics ==
=== Club ===
As of 1 February 2020.

Club	Season	League			State League		Cup		Continental		Other		Total	
Club	Season	Division	Apps	Goals	Apps	Goals	Apps	Goals	Apps	Goals	Apps	Goals	Apps	Goals
São Bernardo	2015	–			0	0	0	0	–		4 (Note: Appearances in the Copa Paulista)	0	4	0
São Bernardo	2016	–			5 (Note: Appearances in the Campeonato Paulista)	0	0	0	–		0	0	5	0
São Bernardo	2017	Série D	0	0	6	0	0	0	–		0	0	6	0
São Bernardo	2018	–			0	0	0	0	–		0	0	0	0
São Bernardo	2019	–			0	0	0	0	–		0	0	0	0
São Bernardo	Total		0	0	11	0	0	0	0	0	4	0	15	0
Boa Esporte (loan)	2017	Série B	13	0	0	0	0	0	–		0	0	0	0
Boa Esporte (loan)	2018	Série B	26	1	12 (Note: Appearances in the Campeonato Mineiro)	1	1 (Note: Appearances in the Copa do Brasil)	0	–		0	0	39	2
Boa Esporte (loan)	Total		39	1	12	1	1	0	0	0	0	0	52	2
Volta Redonda (loan)	2019	Série C	0	0	3 (Note: Appearances in the Campeonato Carioca)	0	0	0	–		0	0	3	0
Roeselare	2019–20	Proximus League	0	0	–		0	0	–		0	0	0	0
Confiança	2020	–			2 (Note: Appearances in the Campeonato Sergipano)	0	0	0	–		1 (Note: Appearances in the Copa do Nordeste)	0	3	0
Career total			39	1	28	1	1	0	0	0	5	0	73	2
