= Bob Straetman =

Belgian footballer

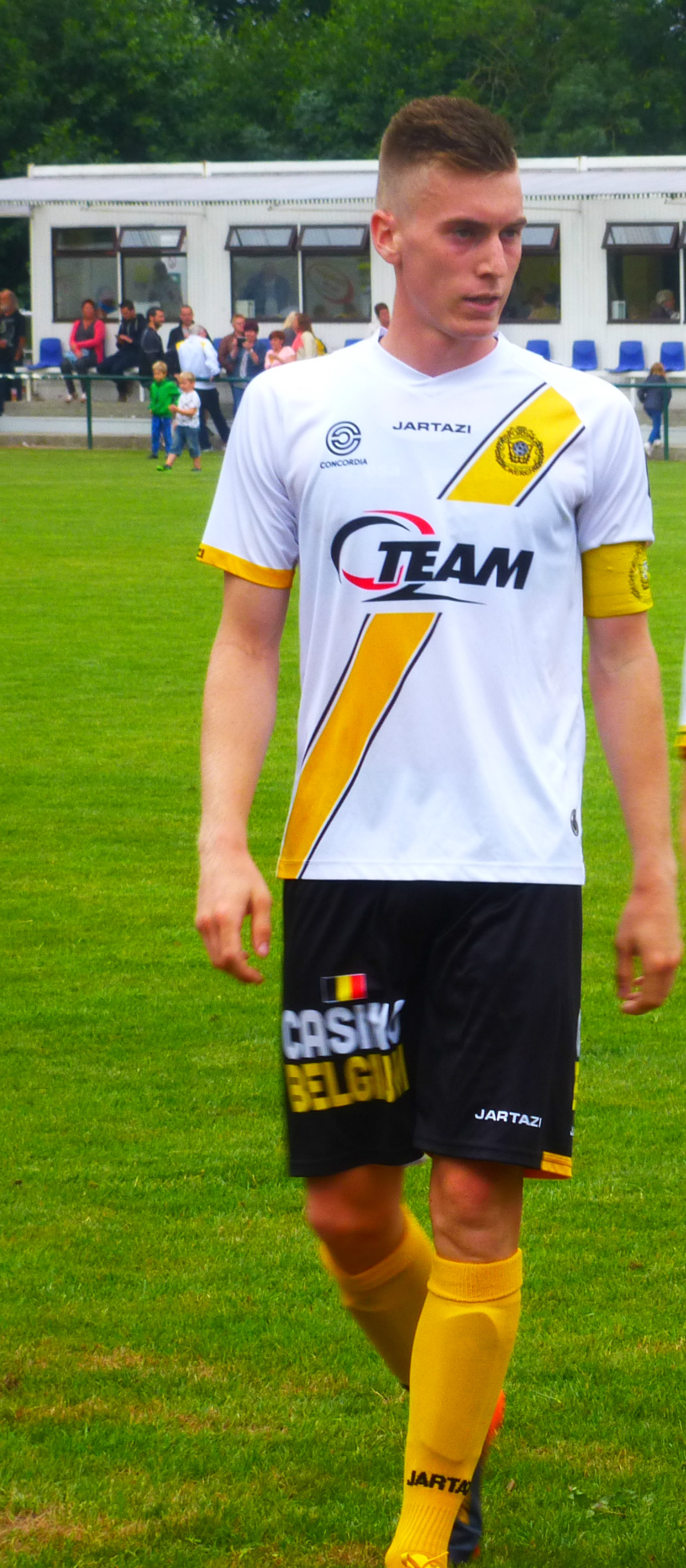

Personal information
- Date of birth: 29 December 1997 (age 28)
- Place of birth: Dendermonde, Belgium
- Height: 1.83 m (6 ft 0 in)
- Position: Forward

Team information
- Current team: Eendracht Aalst
- Number: 11

Youth career
- Lokeren

Senior career*
Years	Team	Apps	(Gls)
2016–2020	Lokeren	55	(3)
2019	→ Virton (loan)	10	(1)
2020–2021	Lierse	9	(1)
2021–2022	Merelbeke	26	(16)
2022–2023	Ninove	29	(8)
2023–2024	Eendracht Aalst	28	(8)
2024–2025	Gullegem	15	(0)
2025–	Eendracht Aalst	0	(0)
- * Club domestic league appearances and goals as of 18:29, 15 January 2026 (UTC)

Bob Straetman (born 29 December 1997) is a Belgian professional footballer who plays as a forward for Eendracht Aalst.
