= Mitja Križan =

Slovenian footballer (born 1997)

Personal information
- Date of birth: 5 June 1997 (age 29)
- Place of birth: Maribor, Slovenia
- Height: 1.95 m (6 ft 5 in)
- Position: Centre-back

Team information
- Current team: Rodina Moscow
- Number: 55

Senior career*
Years	Team	Apps	(Gls)
2015–2016	Aluminij	3	(0)
2016–2018	Celje	12	(0)
2017	→ Drava Ptuj (loan)	10	(4)
2018	Fužinar	16	(9)
2018–2019	Bravo	34	(9)
2019–2021	Lommel	22	(1)
2021	→ Bravo (loan)	14	(1)
2021–2023	Bravo	57	(3)
2023–	Rodina Moscow	106	(1)
- * Club domestic league appearances and goals as of 6 September 2026

Mitja Križan (born 5 June 1997) is a Slovenian football player who plays as a centre-back for Russian Premier League club Rodina Moscow.

== Career ==
Križan joined Russian First League club Rodina Moscow in February 2023 and established himself as a starter since then. Rodina won the 2025–26 Russian First League season and was promoted to the Russian Premier League for the first time in club's history.

Križan made his Russian Premier League debut for Rodina on 25 July 2026 in a game against Spartak Moscow.
