= Rubin Seigers =

Belgian footballer (born 1998)

Personal information
- Full name: Rubin Jenny G. Seigers
- Date of birth: 11 January 1998 (age 28)
- Place of birth: Belgium
- Height: 1.87 m (6 ft 2 in)
- Position: Centre-back

Youth career
- Genk

Senior career*
Years	Team	Apps	(Gls)
2017–2021	Genk	6	(0)
2019–2020	→ Beerschot (loan)	6	(0)
2021–2025	Westerlo	53	(0)
2023–2024	→ Zulte Waregem (loan)	10	(0)
2025–2026	Lommel	5	(0)

International career
2013–2014	Belgium U16	6	(0)
2015	Belgium U17	19	(1)
2016–2017	Belgium U19	6	(0)
- * Club domestic league appearances and goals

Rubin Jenny G. Seigers (born 11 January 1998) is a Belgian former professional footballer who played as a centre-back.

== Club career ==
Coming up through the Westerlo youth ranks, Seigers helped the club to a European play-offs place in the 2022-23 Belgian Pro League under Jonas De Roeck. The following season, Seigers was one of many to leave on either a permanent or temporary basis, joining Zulte Waregem on loan on 5 August 2023.

Zulte's bid to earn promotion back to the top flight saw them denied in the promotion play-offs, and Seigers returned to Westerlo for the 2024-25 campaign. Westerlo won their first three games of the season over Cercle Brugge, KV Mechelen and Union Saint-Gilloise to go top of the Pro League for the first time in their history, two of those against European qualifiers.

On 5 September 2025, Seigers signed a one-year contract with Lommel. He retired from playing at the end of the 2025–26 season.

== Honours ==
Genk

- Belgian First Division A: 2018–19

Westerlo

- Belgian First Division B: 2021–22
