= Issa Marega =

French footballer (born 1998)

Personal information
- Date of birth: 20 April 1998 (age 28)
- Place of birth: Sèvres, France
- Height: 1.96 m (6 ft 5 in)
- Positions: Centre-back; midfielder

Youth career
- 2002–2009: Sèvres FC
- 2009–2011: ACBB
- 2011–2012: Sèvres FC
- 2012–2013: ACBB
- 2013–2014: Meudon AS
- 2014–2015: Porto
- 2015–2018: Caen

Senior career*
Years	Team	Apps	(Gls)
2016–2019	Caen II	30	(2)
2019	Cercle Brugge	15	(0)
2019–2022	Châteauroux	8	(0)
- * Club domestic league appearances and goals as of 13 May 2022

Issa Marega (born 20 April 1998) is a French professional footballer who plays as a centre-back and midfielder.

== Career ==
On 29 May 2018, Marega signed his first professional contract with Stade Malherbe Caen.

On 22 January 2019, Marega joined Cercle Brugge. He made his professional debut with Cercle Brugge in a 3–2 Belgian First Division A loss to Zulte Waregem on 2 February 2019.

== Personal life ==
Marega was born in Sèvres, France. He holds French and Senegalese nationalities.
