= Jerry Prempeh =

Ghanaian footballer (born 1988)

Personal information
- Full name: Jerry Prempeh
- Date of birth: 29 December 1988 (age 37)
- Place of birth: Kumasi, Ghana
- Height: 1.78 m (5 ft 10 in)
- Position: Centre back

Team information
- Current team: Swift Hesperange
- Number: 26

Youth career
- –2003: Le Mée Sports Football
- 2003–2007: Troyes AC

Senior career*
Years	Team	Apps	(Gls)
2007–2009	Troyes AC	5	(0)
2009	FK Mladá Boleslav	1	(0)
2009–2010	US Sénart-Moissy	8	(0)
2010–2011	Virton	37	(2)
2011–2012	FC Fribourg	2	(0)
2012–2019	F91 Dudelange	160	(3)
2019–2020	Virton	24	(0)
2020–	Swift Hesperange	127	(5)
- * Club domestic league appearances and goals as of 13 June 2026

Jerry Prempeh (born 29 December 1988) is a Ghanaian footballer. He currently plays for Swift Hesperange.

== Career ==
Prempeh began his career with Le Mée Sports Football and signed with Troyes AC in 2003. He made five senior caps for Troyes AC and was released in summer 2009, to sign for FK Mladá Boleslav. In November 2009 resign his contract with FK Mladá Boleslav and signed with US Sénart-Moissy. After one season left on 23 June 2010 his club US Sénart-Moissy and signed with R.E. Virton. After just one season left R.E. Virton and joined to Swiss lower League club FC Fribourg.

== International career ==
He also holds French citizenship.
