= Eros Medaglia =

Argentine footballer

Personal information
- Date of birth: 7 September 1994 (age 32)
- Place of birth: Ramos Mejía, Argentina
- Position: Right back

Team information
- Current team: Polisportiva Ossese Calcio
- Number: 43

Senior career*
| Years | Team | Apps | (Gls) |
| 2012–2014 | Vélez Sarsfield | 4 | (0) |
| 2014 | → Atlético Tucumán (loan) | 1 | (0) |
| 2015 | Guaraní Antonio Franco | 22 | (0) |
| 2016 | Gimnasia Mendoza | 10 | (0) |
| 2016–2017 | Atlético de Rafaela | 9 | (0) |
| 2018–2019 | San Miguel | 12 | (0) |
| 2019– | Virton | 1 | (0) |
- * Club domestic league appearances and goals as of 21:46, 27 May 2019 (UTC)

Eros Medaglia (born 7 September 1994) is an Argentine footballer who plays for R.E. Virton as a right back.
