= Brent Gabriël =

Belgian footballer (born 1999)

Personal information
- Full name: Brent Georges E M I Gabriël
- Date of birth: 27 January 1999 (age 27)
- Place of birth: Sint-Niklaas, Belgium
- Height: 1.88 m (6 ft 2 in)
- Position: Goalkeeper

Team information
- Current team: Zulte Waregem
- Number: 13

Senior career*
Years	Team	Apps	(Gls)
2018–2019	Club Brugge	0	(0)
2019–2023	Beveren	6	(0)
2022–2023	→ Dender EH (loan)	0	(0)
2023–2024	Oostende	1	(0)
2024–2025	Lokeren	28	(0)
2025–	Zulte Waregem	34	(0)
- * Club domestic league appearances and goals as of 11 May 2026

Brent Georges E M I Gabriël (born 27 January 1999) is a Belgian professional footballer who plays as a goalkeeper for Belgian Pro League club Zulte Waregem.

== Club career ==
On 6 July 2023, Gabriël signed a two-year contract with Oostende.

On 28 May 2025, Gabriël agreed to join Zulte Waregem for three seasons.
