= Mohamed Fadhloun =

French footballer (born 1994)

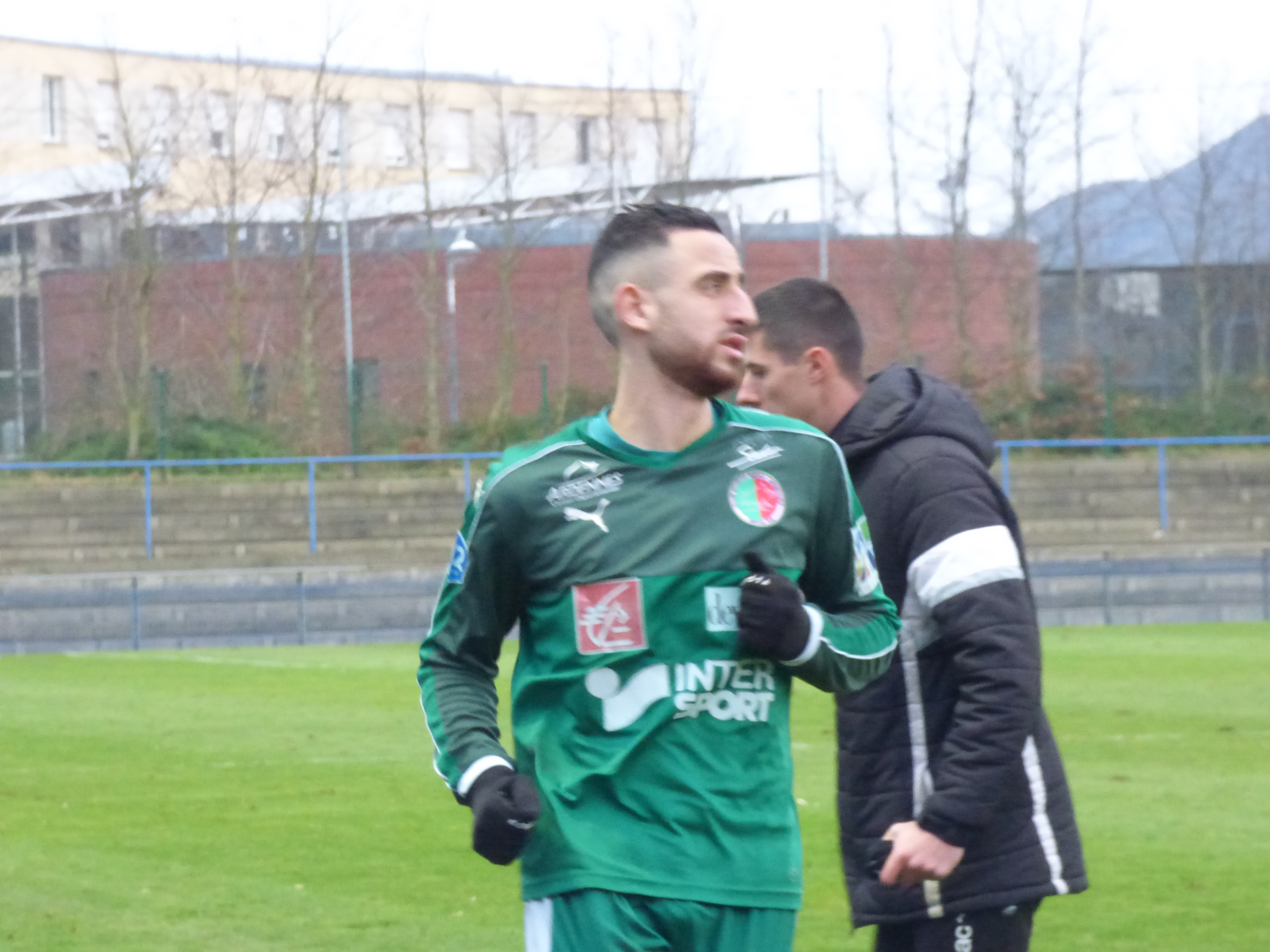
- Fadhloun with Sedan in 2018

Personal information
- Date of birth: 16 February 1994 (age 32)
- Place of birth: Le Pont-de-Beauvoisin, Savoie, France
- Height: 1.88 m (6 ft 2 in)
- Position: Midfielder

Team information
- Current team: Fréjus Saint-Raphaël
- Number: 8

Youth career
- US Pont-de-Beauvoisin
- Bourgoin-Jallieu
- Grenoble
- Annecy

Senior career*
Years	Team	Apps	(Gls)
2014–2016	Bourg-Péronnas	7	(0)
2016–2017	Concarneau	19	(0)
2017–2018	Sedan	28	(4)
2018–2019	Virton	26	(0)
2019–2021	SC Lyon (Note: In 2020, AS Lyon-Duchère changed its name to SC Lyon.)	49	(1)
2021–2023	Sedan	48	(4)
2023–	Fréjus Saint-Raphaël	5	(0)
- * Club domestic league appearances and goals as of 03:43, 2 October 2023 (UTC)

Mohamed Fadhloun (born 16 February 1994) is a French footballer who plays as a midfielder for Championnat National 1 club Fréjus Saint-Raphaël.

== Club career ==
Fadhloun played youth football with US Pont-de-Beauvoisin, Bourgoin-Jallieu, Grenoble and Annecy before signing with Bourg-Péronnas in Championnat National, with whom he gained promotion to Ligue 2 at the end of the 2014–15 Championnat National season. He made just two appearances in the 2015–16 Ligue 2 season, being kept out for long periods through illness, and signed for US Concarneau for the 2016–17 Championnat National season.

In June 2017 Fadhloun moved to Sedan, who had just been relegated to Championnat National 2. In the summer of 2018 he moved to Belgium, to Belgian First Amateur Division side Virton, where he helped them win promotion. In July 2019 he returned to France, signing for Lyon-Duchère (which became Sporting Club Lyon in June 2020) on a one-year contract, with an option for an additional year should the club win promotion to Ligue 2.

On 1 September 2021, he returned to Sedan.

== Personal life ==
Born in France, Fadhloun is of Tunisian descent.
