= Lamine N'dao =

Ivorian footballer

Personal information
- Full name: Mohamed Lamine N'dao
- Date of birth: 9 February 1993 (age 33)
- Place of birth: Divo, Ivory Coast
- Height: 1.90 m (6 ft 3 in)
- Position: Midfielder

Team information
- Current team: Abha
- Number: 6

Senior career*
Years	Team	Apps	(Gls)
2012–2014	Doxa Katokopias	7	(0)
2012–2013	→ Olympiakos Nicosia (loan)	10	(0)
2014–2015	Kokumbo		
2015–2016	Evian B	8	(0)
2015–2016	Evian	2	(0)
2017–2019	Africa Sports		
2017–2019	ASEC Mimosas		
2019–2020	Lokeren	4	(0)
2020–2021	Sporting da Covilhã	25	(0)
2021–2022	Arar		
2022–2024	Stade Tunisien	37	(1)
2024–	Abha	0	(0)
- * Club domestic league appearances and goals as of 22 May 2021

Mohamed Lamine N'dao (born 9 February 1993) is an Ivorian footballer who plays for Abha in Saudi Arabia.

== Club career ==
On 24 July 2019, N'dao joined Belgian club Lokeren. N'dao played the first four games before he at the end of August 2019 returned to Ivory Coast to support his father, who was mortally ill. His father was later announced dead on 21 September 2019. A few hours later, it was announced that his mother also had died.
