= 2017–18 Oud-Heverlee Leuven season =

Oud-Heverlee Leuven
2017–18 season
- Owner: King Power International Group
- Chairman: (Belgium) Chris Vandebroeck (caretaker)
- Manager: (Netherlands) Dennis van Wijk (until 22 September) (England) Nigel Pearson (from 22 September)
- Stadium: King Power at Den Dreef Stadium
- Belgian First Division B: 2nd
- Belgian Cup: Round 6
- Top goalscorer: League: Yannick Aguemon & Esteban Casagolda (10 each); All: Yannick Aguemon (13)
- Highest home attendance: 6,407 vs. Beerschot Wilrijk (24 September 2017)
- Lowest home attendance: 1,488 vs. Turnhout (27 August 2017)
- Average home league attendance: 4,361
Home colours	Away colours

The 2017–18 season was Oud-Heverlee Leuven's 16th competitive season in professional football and the team's second consecutive season at the second level following their relegation from the Belgian Pro League in 2016. It was also the first season under the ownership of the King Power International Group led by Vichai Srivaddhanaprabha.

OH Leuven lost points early throughout the season as several key starting players arrived only late in the 2017 summer transfer window, resulting in a poor league start of 2 wins, 4 draws and 1 loss from the opening 7 games. The team was not able to overtake Beerschot-Wilrijk anymore during the opening tournament, missing the first chance to qualify for the promotion play-offs by three points.

In the closing tournament the team again started mediocre, drawing against struggling teams Roeselare, Union SG and Tubize to set up a crucial away match to Cercle Brugge already on matchday 6, which was lost 1–0 against ten men. OH Leuven thereafter never managed to close the gap to Cercle Brugge and had to settle for the Europa League play-off matches, in which they scored wins against Waasland-Beveren and Excel Mouscron and a draw against a strong Zulte Waregem. Eventually the team ended fourth after finishing the season by being thrashed 5–0 away to Excel Mouscron, a score which was on the scoreboard already at half-time.

In the cup, the team strolled past Turnhout (playing two divisions lower) with seven different players scoring in an 8–0 win, before being eliminated after extra time by top division team Sint-Truiden. OH Leuven managed to come back from a deficit twice, the second time far into extra-time when down to nine men.

== 2017–18 squad ==
- This section lists players who were in Oud-Heveree Leuven's first team squad at any point during the 2017–18 season
- The symbol § indicates player left mid-season
- The symbol # indicates player joined mid-season
- The symbol ¥ indicates a youngster who has appeared on the match sheet at least once during the season (possibly as unused substitute)
- Italics indicate loan player

No.	Nationality	Name	Position	Joined First Team	Previous club
Goalkeepers
1	(Belgium)	Nick Gillekens	GK	2015	Youth Squad
16	(Thailand)	Kawin Thamsatchanan^{#}	GK	2018	(Thailand) Muangthong United
21	(Belgium)	Andreas Suederick^{¥}	GK	NA, Youth Squad	(Belgium) Genk
26	(Belgium)	Laurent Henkinet	GK	2017	(Belgium) Waasland-Beveren
34	(Ivory Coast)	Barry Boubacar Copa	GK	2017	(Belgium) Lokeren
Defenders
2	(Belgium)	Dimitri Daeseleire	RB	2017	(Belgium) Antwerp
3	(Belgium) / (Democratic Republic of the Congo)	Derrick Tshimanga	LB	2017	(Netherlands) Willem II
4	(Belgium)	Kenneth Schuermans	CB	2017	(Belgium) Westerlo
5	(England)	Elliott Moore	CB	Loan	(England) Leicester City
12	(France)	Clément Fabre	CB	2017	(Belgium) Tubize
15	(Belgium)	Mamadou Diarra^{¥}	CB	NA, Youth Squad	Youth Squad
18	(Ivory Coast)	Mamadou Bagayoko^{§}	RB	2017	(Belgium) Sint-Truiden
22	(Belgium)	Michael Caubergs^{¥}	CB	NA, Youth Squad	Youth Squad
25	(Belgium)	Jenthe Mertens^{¥}	CB	2017	Youth Squad
27	(Belgium)	Jordy Gillekens^{¥}	CB	2017	Youth Squad
31	(France)	Benjamin Boulenger	LB	Loan	(Belgium) Charleroi
Midfielders
6	(Belgium)	David Hubert	CM	2017	(Belgium) Gent
8	(Ivory Coast) / (France)	Flavien Le Postollec	CM	2014	(Belgium) Mons
10	(Belgium)	Geert Berben^{§}	CM	2017	(Belgium) Lommel United
11	(Belgium)	Nikola Storm	LW / RW	Loan	(Belgium) Club Brugge
14	(Belgium) / (Portugal)	Thomas Azevedo^{§}	LW / RW	2011	(Belgium) Lommel United
15	(Ghana)	Kamal Sowah^{#}	CM	Loan	(England) Leicester City
17	(France)	Julien Gorius	CM	2017	(China) Changchun Yatai
19	(France)	Samy Kehli^{#}	AM	Loan	(Belgium) Lokeren
19	(Nigeria)	Godwin Odibo	CM	2017	(Nigeria) Nath Boys
24	(Belgium)	Jarno Libert^{¥}	CM	2017	Youth Squad
28	(Belgium)	Koen Persoons	CM	2017	(Belgium) Lokeren
29	(Netherlands)	Dico Jap Tjong^{¥}	CM	NA, Youth Squad	(Belgium) Genk Youth
30	(Belgium)	Joeri Dequevy^{#}	RW	2018	(Belgium) Antwerp
33	(Belgium)	Mathieu Maertens	CM/AM	2017	(Belgium) Cercle Brugge
Forwards
7	(France) / (Benin)	Yannick Aguemon	CF / LW / RW	2017	(Belgium) Union SG
9	(Belgium) / (Spain) / (Uruguay)	Esteban Casagolda	CF	2016	(Belgium) Dender EH
18	(Belgium)	Jo Gilis^{¥}	CF	2018	Youth Squad
20	(Senegal)	Simon Diedhiou	CF	2017	(Belgium) Gent
22	(Belgium)	Daan Vekemans^{¥}	CF	2018	Youth Squad
23	(North Macedonia)	Jovan Kostovski	CF	2013	(North Macedonia) Vardar
32	(Scotland)	Tony Watt^{§}	CF	2017	(England) Charlton Athletic

== Transfers ==
During the summer of 2017, OH Leuven was very active on the transfer market, although initially this was most noticeable on the outgoing side with the contracts of Nicolas Delporte, Nathan Durieux, Jonathan Kindermans and Fazlı Kocabaş not being prolonged and five loan players returning to their parent clubs: Nathan de Medina returned to Anderlecht, Siebe Horemans, Lucas Schoofs and Serge Tabekou all returned to Gent and Yannick Loemba returned to Oostende. No official news was released at the time about Jeroen Simaeys, who had suffered a serious injury early 2017, but he was no longer being presented as part of the squad in spite of having a running contract. Early 2018 it would become apparent that the injury had effectively ended Simaeys' professional football career and that he had found an agreement with the club to terminate his contract early. On top of this in May Belgian First Amateur Division team Heist announced the signing of defender Mehdi Bounou, while Kenneth Houdret moved to direct opponents Union SG. On the incoming side, OH Leuven announced mid May the dual signing of defenders Clément Fabre (from Tubize) and Kenneth Schuermans (from Westerlo), while also mentioning that goalkeeper Laurent Henkinet had extended his contract by three seasons until 2020. Early June saw two further departures, with first Soufiane El Banouhi following Kenneth Houdret to Union SG, followed by Romain Reynaud who moved to French fourth tier team Andrézieux-Bouthéon. Later that month three more players departed the squad as Pieter-Jan Monteyne moved to Roeselare, Pierre-Yves Ngawa was signed by Serie B team Avellino and Ben Yagan moved to the Belgian First Amateur Division to play for Dessel Sport, while on the incoming side OH Leuven strengthened the squad with four players: Geert Berben was seen as a promising youngster and picked up from relegated Lommel United, experienced French midfielder Julien Gorius was brought in for free from Chinese team Changchun Yatai and with Yannick Aguemon (from Union SG) and Nikola Storm (again on loan from Club Brugge), two fast wingers were added to the squad. Storm had already been on loan since the 2016–17 winter transfer window but the loan was extended for another season. In July, the team signed three Belgian players, young midfielder Mathieu Maertens was brought in from Cercle Brugge, while defenders Derrick Tshimanga (from Willem II) and Dimitri Daeseleire (from Antwerp) were brought in for their experience. Meanwhile, Simon Bracke and Cédric D'Ulivo left the team, respectively to Hasselt and Icelandic team FH. Traditionally, OH Leuven was very active in the month of August. As newly signed player Clément Fabre had suffered a serious injury near the end of July, which meant he would be unavailable for at least several months, two more defenders were brought in: Ivorian international Mamadou Bagayoko was signed from Sint-Truiden while English youth international Elliott Moore arrived on loan from Leicester City, with that transfer being arranged due to the fact that both OH Leuven and Leicester were now under ownership of King Power. Furthermore, experienced midfielder David Hubert was signed from Gent and the offensive department was reinforced with two foreign strikers, Scotsman Tony Watt from Charlton Athletic and Senegalese Simon Diedhiou from Gent. Four Belgian youngsters were sent out on loans to various teams playing in the 2017–18 Belgian First Amateur Division to get more playing time: Benjamin Bambi and Jordy Lokando were sent to Heist, striker Din Sula to Lommel and winger Leo Njengo to Dessel Sport. Finally, on transfer deadline day, three more players arrived: defender Benjamin Boulenger was loaned from Charleroi, 20 year old Nigerian winger Godwin Odibo was signed from Nath Boys Academy and experienced Belgian defender Koen Persoons was brought in from Lokeren. Although Ivorian international goalkeeper Copa had announced his retirement already a few weeks before, he arrived one day after the end of the transfer window on a free basis from Lokeren as an experienced backup and coach for Nick Gillekens, Laurent Henkinet and youngster Andreas Suederick.

During the 2017–18 winter transfer window, OH Leuven was much less active. Geert Berben had both not been receiving much playing time and was therefore loaned out to Oosterzonen Oosterwijk. Also loaned out was Thomas Azevedo, who was unhappy to be used only as a substitute and returned on loan to his former team Lommel. Finally, Mamadou Bagayoko, who had only been signed during the summer and did feature regularly in the team, was loaned out to Belgian First Division A team Mechelen where he was again reunited with Dennis van Wijk who was previously in charge at OH Leuven when Bagayoko joined the team. On the incoming side, despite already having four goalkeepers, the Thai owners behind Kind Power brought in Thailand national football team first goalkeeper Kawin Thamsatchanan from Muangthong United on a five-year deal. Furthermore, midfielder Samy Kehli was loaned from Lokeren, winger Joeri Dequevy arrived from Antwerp where he was deemed surplus and Ghanaian youngster Kamal Sowah became the second player on loan from Leicester City as he arrived on an 18-month deal until the summer of 2019. In February, Tony Watt was released after failing to make an impression.

=== Transfers In ===
Date from	Position	Nationality	Name	From	Fee	Ref.
19 May 2017	DF	(France)	Clément Fabre	(Belgium) Tubize	Undisclosed	
19 May 2017	DF	(Belgium)	Kenneth Schuermans	(Belgium) Westerlo	Undisclosed	
13 June 2017	MF	(Belgium)	Geert Berben	(Belgium) Lommel	Undisclosed	
13 June 2017	MF	(France)	Julien Gorius	(China) Changchun Yatai	Free	
15 June 2017	MF	(Belgium)	Nikola Storm	(Belgium) Club Brugge	Loan Extended	
28 June 2017	W	(France)	Yannick Aguemon	(Belgium) Union SG	Undisclosed	
12 July 2017	MF	(Belgium)	Mathieu Maertens	(Belgium) Cercle Brugge	Undisclosed	
14 July 2017	DF	(Belgium)	Derrick Tshimanga	(Netherlands) Willem II	Free	
19 July 2017	DF	(Belgium)	Dimitri Daeseleire	(Belgium) Antwerp	Free	
13 August 2017	FW	(Scotland)	Tony Watt	(England) Charlton Athletic	Undisclosed	
15 August 2017	DF	(Ivory Coast)	Mamadou Bagayoko	(Belgium) Sint-Truiden	Undisclosed	
18 August 2017	MF	(Belgium)	David Hubert	(Belgium) Gent	Undisclosed	
18 August 2017	DF	(England)	Elliott Moore	(England) Leicester City	Loan	
24 August 2017	FW	(Senegal)	Simon Diedhiou	(Belgium) Gent	Undisclosed	
31 August 2017	DF	(France)	Benjamin Boulenger	(Belgium) Charleroi	Loan	
31 August 2017	MF	(Nigeria)	Godwin Odibo	(Nigeria) Nath Boys Academy	Undisclosed	
31 August 2017	MF	(Belgium)	Koen Persoons	(Belgium) Lokeren	Undisclosed	
1 September 2017	GK	(Ivory Coast)	Copa	(Belgium) Lokeren	Free	
10 January 2018	MF	(France)	Samy Kehli	(Belgium) Lokeren	Loan	
10 January 2018	GK	(Thailand)	Kawin Thamsatchanan	(Thailand) Muangthong United	Undisclosed	
20 January 2018	MF	(Belgium)	Joeri Dequevy	(Belgium) Antwerp	Free	
31 January 2018	MF	(Ghana)	Kamal Sowah	(England) Leicester City	Loan	

=== Transfers Out ===
Date to	Position	Nationality	Name	To	Fee	Ref.
5 May 2017	MF	(Belgium)	Mehdi Bounou	(Belgium) Heist	Free	
15 May 2017	MF	(Belgium)	Kenneth Houdret	(Belgium) Union SG	Free	
End of 2016–17 season	DF	(Belgium)	Nicolas Delporte	Free Agent	Released	
End of 2016–17 season	MF	(Belgium)	Nathan de Medina	(Belgium) Anderlecht	Loan Return	
End of 2016–17 season	DF	(Belgium)	Nathan Durieux	Free Agent	Released	
End of 2016–17 season	DF	(Belgium)	Siebe Horemans	(Belgium) Gent	Loan Return	
End of 2016–17 season	MF	(Belgium)	Jonathan Kindermans	Free Agent	Released	
End of 2016–17 season	DF	(Belgium)	Fazlı Kocabaş	Free Agent	Released	
End of 2016–17 season	MF	(Belgium)	Yannick Loemba	(Belgium) Oostende	Loan Return	
End of 2016–17 season	MF	(Belgium)	Lucas Schoofs	(Belgium) Gent	Loan Return	
End of 2016–17 season	DF	(Belgium)	Jeroen Simaeys	Free Agent	Released	
End of 2016–17 season	MF	(Cameroon)	Serge Tabekou	(Belgium) Gent	Loan Return	
2 June 2017	DF	(Belgium)	Soufiane El Banouhi	(Belgium) Union SG	Undisclosed	
6 June 2017	DF	(France)	Romain Reynaud	(France) Andrézieux-Bouthéon	Free	
20 June 2017	DF	(Belgium)	Pieter-Jan Monteyne	(Belgium) Roeselare	Undisclosed	
26 June 2017	DF	(Belgium)	Pierre-Yves Ngawa	(Italy) Avellino	Undisclosed	
28 June 2017	FW	(Belgium)	Ben Yagan	(Belgium) Dessel Sport	Free	
26 July 2017	MF	(Belgium)	Simon Bracke	(Belgium) Hasselt	Free	
31 July 2017	MF	(France)	Cédric D'Ulivo	(Iceland) FH	Free	
3 August 2017	MF	(Belgium)	Jordy Lokando	(Belgium) Heist	Loan	
28 August 2017	FW	(Belgium)	Din Sula	(Belgium) Lommel	Loan	
30 August 2017	MF	(Belgium)	Benjamin Bambi	(Belgium) Heist	Loan	
31 August 2017	FW	(Belgium)	Leo Njengo	(Belgium) Dessel Sport	Loan	
23 January 2018	MF	(Belgium)	Geert Berben	(Belgium) Oosterzonen Oosterwijk	Loan	
30 January 2018	MF	(Belgium)	Thomas Azevedo	(Belgium) Lommel	Loan	
31 January 2018	DF	(Ivory Coast)	Mamadou Bagayoko	(Belgium) Mechelen	Loan	
12 February 2018	FW	(Scotland)	Tony Watt	Free Agent	Released	

== Belgian First Division B ==
OHL's season in the Belgian First Division B began on 5 August 2017.

=== Results ===
2017–18 Belgian First Division B
Match Details	Home team	Result	Away team	Lineup	Unused Subs	Bookings
Opening tournament
5 August 2017; 20:30; King Power at Den Dreef Stadium; Leuven; Attendance: 4.321; Report	Oud-Heverlee Leuven	2-2	Lierse	Henkinet; Daeseleire, J. Gillekens, Schuermans, Mertens; Aguemon (79' Azevedo), Gorius, Maertens, Storm; Kostovski, Casagolda	N. Gillekens; Bambi; Berben; Caubergs; Libert; Njengo	(yellow card) 81' Mertens; (yellow card) 89' Maertens
5 August 2017; 20:30; King Power at Den Dreef Stadium; Leuven; Attendance: 4.321; Report	39' Aguemon; 52' Gorius	0-1; 1-1; 2-1; 2-2	12' Bougrine 60' Boussaid	Henkinet; Daeseleire, J. Gillekens, Schuermans, Mertens; Aguemon (79' Azevedo), Gorius, Maertens, Storm; Kostovski, Casagolda	N. Gillekens; Bambi; Berben; Caubergs; Libert; Njengo	(yellow card) 81' Mertens; (yellow card) 89' Maertens
12 August 2017; 17:00; Schiervelde Stadion; Roeselare; Attendance: 1.460; Report	Roeselare	3-1	Oud-Heverlee Leuven	Henkinet; Daeseleire, J. Gillekens, Schuermans, Mertens; Aguemon, Gorius (46' Azevedo), Maertens (78' Berben), Storm; Kostovski (60' Libert), Casagolda	N. Gillekens; Caubergs; Njengo; Sula	(yellow card) 47' Daeseleire; (yellow card) 73' Azevedo
12 August 2017; 17:00; Schiervelde Stadion; Roeselare; Attendance: 1.460; Report	45+2' Brouwers; 48' Samyn; 72' Van Acker	1-0; 2-0; 3-0; 3-1	77' Libert	Henkinet; Daeseleire, J. Gillekens, Schuermans, Mertens; Aguemon, Gorius (46' Azevedo), Maertens (78' Berben), Storm; Kostovski (60' Libert), Casagolda	N. Gillekens; Caubergs; Njengo; Sula	(yellow card) 47' Daeseleire; (yellow card) 73' Azevedo
19 August 2017; 20:30; King Power at Den Dreef Stadium; Leuven; Attendance: 3.720; Report	Oud-Heverlee Leuven	7-1	Cercle Brugge	N. Gillekens; Daeseleire, Schuermans, Moore, Bagayoko (75' Mertens); Libert, Maertens, Azevedo (63' Hubert); Aguemon, Watt, Storm (78' Kostovski)	Suederick; Berben; Casagolda; J. Gillekens	(yellow card) 20' Bagayoko
19 August 2017; 20:30; King Power at Den Dreef Stadium; Leuven; Attendance: 3.720; Report	26' Storm; 29' Aguemon; 38' Maertens; 53' Aguemon 65' Storm; 80' Schuermans; 90' (p) Aguemon	1-0; 2-0; 3-0; 4-0; 4-1; 5-1; 6-1; 7-1	60' Rodas	N. Gillekens; Daeseleire, Schuermans, Moore, Bagayoko (75' Mertens); Libert, Maertens, Azevedo (63' Hubert); Aguemon, Watt, Storm (78' Kostovski)	Suederick; Berben; Casagolda; J. Gillekens	(yellow card) 20' Bagayoko
2 September 2017; 17:00; Het Kuipje; Westerlo; Attendance: 2.500; Report	Westerlo	2-2	Oud-Heverlee Leuven	N. Gillekens; Daeseleire, Schuermans, Moore, Mertens (63' Boulenger); Maertens, Hubert, Aguemon; Azevedo (60' Persoons), Watt (77' Diedhiou), Storm	Copa; Casagolda; J. Gillekens; Libert	(yellow card) 55' Schuermans; (yellow card) 83' (yellow-red card) 90+2' Hubert
2 September 2017; 17:00; Het Kuipje; Westerlo; Attendance: 2.500; Report	3' De Ceulaer 15' Naessens	1-0; 1-1; 2-1; 2-2	11' Azevedo 17' Watt	N. Gillekens; Daeseleire, Schuermans, Moore, Mertens (63' Boulenger); Maertens, Hubert, Aguemon; Azevedo (60' Persoons), Watt (77' Diedhiou), Storm	Copa; Casagolda; J. Gillekens; Libert	(yellow card) 55' Schuermans; (yellow card) 83' (yellow-red card) 90+2' Hubert
8 September 2017; 20:30; King Power at Den Dreef Stadium; Leuven; Attendance: 3.000; Report	Oud-Heverlee Leuven	2-0	Tubize	N. Gillekens; Daeseleire, Schuermans, Moore, Boulenger; Aguemon (90+2' Libert), Maertens, Persoons, Storm (46' Azevedo); Diedhiou, Watt (85' Bagayoko)	Copa; Berben; Casagolda; Mertens	
8 September 2017; 20:30; King Power at Den Dreef Stadium; Leuven; Attendance: 3.000; Report	74' Moore; 90+1' Aguemon	1-0; 2-0		N. Gillekens; Daeseleire, Schuermans, Moore, Boulenger; Aguemon (90+2' Libert), Maertens, Persoons, Storm (46' Azevedo); Diedhiou, Watt (85' Bagayoko)	Copa; Berben; Casagolda; Mertens	
15 September 2017; 20:30; King Baudouin Stadium; Brussels; Attendance: 1.600; Report	Union SG	0-0	Oud-Heverlee Leuven	N. Gillekens; Daeseleire, Schuermans, Moore, Bagayoko; Hubert, Maertens, Persoons; Aguemon (73' Casagolda), Diedhiou (60' Tshimanga), Storm	Copa; Boulenger; Le Postollec; Mertens; Watt	(yellow card) 53' N. Gillekens; (yellow card) 83' Casagolda
24 September 2017; 16:00; King Power at Den Dreef Stadium; Leuven; Attendance: 6.407; Report	Oud-Heverlee Leuven	1-1	Beerschot Wilrijk	N. Gillekens; Daeseleire, Schuermans, Moore, Bagayoko; Hubert, Maertens (65' Casagolda), Persoons; Aguemon (58' Azevedo), Diedhiou (75' Watt), Storm	Suederick; Boulenger; Le Postollec; Mertens	(yellow card) 41' Maertens; (yellow card) 74' Schuermans; (yellow card) 76' Moore
24 September 2017; 16:00; King Power at Den Dreef Stadium; Leuven; Attendance: 6.407; Report	90+6' Storm	0-1; 1-1	62' Placca Fessou	N. Gillekens; Daeseleire, Schuermans, Moore, Bagayoko; Hubert, Maertens (65' Casagolda), Persoons; Aguemon (58' Azevedo), Diedhiou (75' Watt), Storm	Suederick; Boulenger; Le Postollec; Mertens	(yellow card) 41' Maertens; (yellow card) 74' Schuermans; (yellow card) 76' Moore
30 September 2017; 17:00; King Power at Den Dreef Stadium; Leuven; Attendance: 4.003; Report	Oud-Heverlee Leuven	2-0	Roeselare	N. Gillekens; Daeseleire, Schuermans, Moore, Bagayoko (78' Tshimanga); Hubert, Maertens (65' Gorius), Persoons; Azevedo, Casagolda (85' Diedhiou), Storm	Suederick; Berben; Boulenger; Le Postollec	
30 September 2017; 17:00; King Power at Den Dreef Stadium; Leuven; Attendance: 4.003; Report	14' Storm; 89' Diedhiou	1-0; 2-0		N. Gillekens; Daeseleire, Schuermans, Moore, Bagayoko (78' Tshimanga); Hubert, Maertens (65' Gorius), Persoons; Azevedo, Casagolda (85' Diedhiou), Storm	Suederick; Berben; Boulenger; Le Postollec	
3 October 2017; 20:30; Jan Breydel Stadium; Bruges; Attendance: 3.000; Report	Cercle Brugge	0-3	Oud-Heverlee Leuven	N. Gillekens; Daeseleire, Schuermans, Moore, Tshimanga; Hubert, Maertens, Persoons; Azevedo (66' Gorius), Casagolda, Aguemon (84' Diedhiou), Storm (88' Le Postollec)	Suederick; Berben; Boulenger; Mertens	(yellow card) 34' Tshimanga
3 October 2017; 20:30; Jan Breydel Stadium; Bruges; Attendance: 3.000; Report		0-1; 0-2; 0-3	28' Moore; 54' Casagolda; 77' Maertens	N. Gillekens; Daeseleire, Schuermans, Moore, Tshimanga; Hubert, Maertens, Persoons; Azevedo (66' Gorius), Casagolda, Aguemon (84' Diedhiou), Storm (88' Le Postollec)	Suederick; Berben; Boulenger; Mertens	(yellow card) 34' Tshimanga
8 October 2017; 18:00; King Power at Den Dreef Stadium; Leuven; Attendance: 4.456; Report	Oud-Heverlee Leuven	2-1	Westerlo	N. Gillekens; Daeseleire, Schuermans, Moore, Tshimanga (54' Mertens); Hubert, Maertens, Persoons; Azevedo (46' Aguemon), Casagolda, Storm (84' Diedhiou)	Henkinet; Boulenger; Gorius; Le Postollec	(yellow card) 61' Mertens
8 October 2017; 18:00; King Power at Den Dreef Stadium; Leuven; Attendance: 4.456; Report	63' Casagolda 89' Casagolda	1-0; 1-1; 2-1	79' Annys	N. Gillekens; Daeseleire, Schuermans, Moore, Tshimanga (54' Mertens); Hubert, Maertens, Persoons; Azevedo (46' Aguemon), Casagolda, Storm (84' Diedhiou)	Henkinet; Boulenger; Gorius; Le Postollec	(yellow card) 61' Mertens
13 October 2017; 20:30; Stade Leburton; Tubize; Report	Tubize	1-2	Oud-Heverlee Leuven	N. Gillekens; Boulenger, Schuermans, Moore, Bagayoko; Hubert (35' Le Postollec), Maertens (59' Gorius), Persoons; Aguemon, Casagolda, Storm (85' Libert)	Henkinet; Azevedo; Berben; Diedhiou	(yellow card) 82' Persoons
13 October 2017; 20:30; Stade Leburton; Tubize; Report	54' Zenke	0-1; 1-1; 1-2	30' Casagolda 76' Aguemon	N. Gillekens; Boulenger, Schuermans, Moore, Bagayoko; Hubert (35' Le Postollec), Maertens (59' Gorius), Persoons; Aguemon, Casagolda, Storm (85' Libert)	Henkinet; Azevedo; Berben; Diedhiou	(yellow card) 82' Persoons
22 October 2017; 20:30; Olympic Stadium; Antwerp; Report	Beerschot Wilrijk	2-2	Oud-Heverlee Leuven	N. Gillekens; Daeseleire, Schuermans, Moore, Tshimanga; Libert, Maertens, Persoons; Aguemon (46' Bagayoko), Casagolda (65' Diedhiou), Storm (85' Gorius)	Henkinet; Azevedo; Boulenger; Kostovski	(yellow card) 31' Aguemon; (yellow card) 63' Persoons; (yellow card) 90+1' Tshimanga
22 October 2017; 20:30; Olympic Stadium; Antwerp; Report	13' François 83' Hoffer	1-0; 1-1; 1-2; 2-2	54' Maertens; 58' Casagolda	N. Gillekens; Daeseleire, Schuermans, Moore, Tshimanga; Libert, Maertens, Persoons; Aguemon (46' Bagayoko), Casagolda (65' Diedhiou), Storm (85' Gorius)	Henkinet; Azevedo; Boulenger; Kostovski	(yellow card) 31' Aguemon; (yellow card) 63' Persoons; (yellow card) 90+1' Tshimanga
28 October 2017; 20:30; King Power at Den Dreef Stadium; Leuven; Report	Oud-Heverlee Leuven	1-0	Union SG	N. Gillekens; Daeseleire, Schuermans, Moore, Tshimanga (27' Bagayoko); Libert, Maertens, Persoons; Aguemon (70' Watt), Casagolda, Storm (86' Azevedo)	Henkinet; Diedhiou; Gorius; Mertens	(yellow card) 5' Daeseleire; (yellow card) 8' Tshimanga; (yellow card) 79' Schuermans; (yellow card) 90' Maertens
28 October 2017; 20:30; King Power at Den Dreef Stadium; Leuven; Report	64' Schuermans	1-0		N. Gillekens; Daeseleire, Schuermans, Moore, Tshimanga (27' Bagayoko); Libert, Maertens, Persoons; Aguemon (70' Watt), Casagolda, Storm (86' Azevedo)	Henkinet; Diedhiou; Gorius; Mertens	(yellow card) 5' Daeseleire; (yellow card) 8' Tshimanga; (yellow card) 79' Schuermans; (yellow card) 90' Maertens
5 November 2017; 16:00; Herman Vanderpoortenstadion; Lier	Lierse	2-1	Oud-Heverlee Leuven	N. Gillekens (67' Henkinet); Daeseleire, Schuermans, Moore, Bagayoko; Hubert, Maertens, Persoons (84' Watt); Aguemon, Casagolda, Storm (66' Azevedo)	Boulenger; Diedhiou; Gorius; Libert	(yellow card) 68' Aguemon; (yellow card) 71' Casagolda; (yellow card) 72' Persoons; (yellow card) 85' Moore; (yellow card) 90+2' Watt
5 November 2017; 16:00; Herman Vanderpoortenstadion; Lier	64' Yagan; 73' Yagan	0-1; 1-1; 2-1	51' Aguemon	N. Gillekens (67' Henkinet); Daeseleire, Schuermans, Moore, Bagayoko; Hubert, Maertens, Persoons (84' Watt); Aguemon, Casagolda, Storm (66' Azevedo)	Boulenger; Diedhiou; Gorius; Libert	(yellow card) 68' Aguemon; (yellow card) 71' Casagolda; (yellow card) 72' Persoons; (yellow card) 85' Moore; (yellow card) 90+2' Watt
Closing tournament
12 November 2017; 18:00; King Power at Den Dreef Stadium; Leuven	Oud-Heverlee Leuven	1-1	Roeselare	N. Gillekens; Daeseleire, Schuermans, Moore, Tshimanga; Gorius (61' Storm), Hubert, Persoons; Maertens (84' Watt), Aguemon, Casagolda (86' Diedhiou), Aguemon	Boulenger; Henkinet; Libert; Mertens	(yellow card) 10' Gorius; (yellow card) 20' Persoons; (yellow card) 74' Storm; (yellow card) 89' Watt
12 November 2017; 18:00; King Power at Den Dreef Stadium; Leuven	8' Casagolda	1-0; 1-1	78' (o.g.) N. Gillekens	N. Gillekens; Daeseleire, Schuermans, Moore, Tshimanga; Gorius (61' Storm), Hubert, Persoons; Maertens (84' Watt), Aguemon, Casagolda (86' Diedhiou), Aguemon	Boulenger; Henkinet; Libert; Mertens	(yellow card) 10' Gorius; (yellow card) 20' Persoons; (yellow card) 74' Storm; (yellow card) 89' Watt
18 November 2017; 20:30; Olympic Stadium; Antwerp	Beerschot Wilrijk	1-2	Oud-Heverlee Leuven	N. Gillekens; Daeseleire, Schuermans, Moore, Tshimanga (90+2' Boulenger); Libert, Hubert, Maertens; Aguemon (90' Bagayoko), Casagolda (77' Watt), Storm	Azevedo; Gorius; Henkinet; Kostovski	(yellow card) 51' Libert; (yellow card) 71' Schuermans
18 November 2017; 20:30; Olympic Stadium; Antwerp	69' Hoffer	0-1; 0-2; 1-2	58' Aguemon; 65' (p) Aguemon	N. Gillekens; Daeseleire, Schuermans, Moore, Tshimanga (90+2' Boulenger); Libert, Hubert, Maertens; Aguemon (90' Bagayoko), Casagolda (77' Watt), Storm	Azevedo; Gorius; Henkinet; Kostovski	(yellow card) 51' Libert; (yellow card) 71' Schuermans
25 November 2017; 17:00; King Baudouin Stadium; Brussels	Union SG	0-0	Oud-Heverlee Leuven	N. Gillekens; Daeseleire, Schuermans, Moore, Tshimanga; Libert, Hubert, Maertens; Aguemon, Casagolda (74' Watt), Storm (80' Bagayoko)	Azevedo; Boulenger; Gorius; Henkinet; Kostovski	(yellow card) 51' Schuermans; (yellow card) 79' Tshimanga; (yellow card) 90+4' (yellow-red card) 90+4' Aguemon
3 December 2017; 16:00; King Power at Den Dreef Stadium; Leuven	Oud-Heverlee Leuven	1-1	Tubize	N. Gillekens; Daeseleire, Moore, Boulenger, Tshimanga; Libert, Hubert (68' Persoons), Maertens; Storm, Casagolda, Watt	Azevedo; Bagayoko; J. Gillekens; Gorius; Henkinet; Kostovski	(yellow card) 65' Watt
3 December 2017; 16:00; King Power at Den Dreef Stadium; Leuven	34' (o.g.) Ba	1-0; 1-1	59' (p) Stevance	N. Gillekens; Daeseleire, Moore, Boulenger, Tshimanga; Libert, Hubert (68' Persoons), Maertens; Storm, Casagolda, Watt	Azevedo; Bagayoko; J. Gillekens; Gorius; Henkinet; Kostovski	(yellow card) 65' Watt
9 December 2017; 17:00; Het Kuipje; Westerlo	Westerlo	1-0	Oud-Heverlee Leuven	N. Gillekens; Daeseleire, Schuermans, Moore, Tshimanga; Libert (46' Gorius), Persoons, Maertens; Aguemon, Watt (73' Diedhiou), Storm (61' Casagolda)	Bagayoko; Boulenger; Henkinet; Hubert	(yellow card) 39' Watt
9 December 2017; 17:00; Het Kuipje; Westerlo	19' Naessens	1-0		N. Gillekens; Daeseleire, Schuermans, Moore, Tshimanga; Libert (46' Gorius), Persoons, Maertens; Aguemon, Watt (73' Diedhiou), Storm (61' Casagolda)	Bagayoko; Boulenger; Henkinet; Hubert	(yellow card) 39' Watt
15 December 2017; 20:30; King Power at Den Dreef Stadium; Leuven	Oud-Heverlee Leuven	2-1	Lierse	N. Gillekens; Daeseleire, Schuermans, Moore, Tshimanga; Hubert, Persoons (76' Libert), Maertens; Aguemon (70' Azevedo), Casagolda, Storm (81' Bagayoko)	Boulenger; Diedhiou; Henkinet; Watt	(yellow card) 66' Aguemon; (yellow card) 68' Tshimanga; (yellow card) 88' Libert
15 December 2017; 20:30; King Power at Den Dreef Stadium; Leuven	9' Casagolda; 34' Persoons	1-0; 2-0; 2-1	90' Bourdin	N. Gillekens; Daeseleire, Schuermans, Moore, Tshimanga; Hubert, Persoons (76' Libert), Maertens; Aguemon (70' Azevedo), Casagolda, Storm (81' Bagayoko)	Boulenger; Diedhiou; Henkinet; Watt	(yellow card) 66' Aguemon; (yellow card) 68' Tshimanga; (yellow card) 88' Libert
5 January 2018; 20:30; Jan Breydel Stadium; Bruges	Cercle Brugge	1-0	Oud-Heverlee Leuven	N. Gillekens; Daeseleire, Schuermans, Moore, Bagayoko (69' Boulenger); Hubert (56' Gorius), Persoons, Maertens; Aguemon, Casagolda (56' Diedhiou), Storm	Azevedo; Henkinet; Libert; Mertens	(yellow card) 12' Daeseleire; (yellow card) 75' Persoons
5 January 2018; 20:30; Jan Breydel Stadium; Bruges	64' (p) Cardona	1-0		N. Gillekens; Daeseleire, Schuermans, Moore, Bagayoko (69' Boulenger); Hubert (56' Gorius), Persoons, Maertens; Aguemon, Casagolda (56' Diedhiou), Storm	Azevedo; Henkinet; Libert; Mertens	(yellow card) 12' Daeseleire; (yellow card) 75' Persoons
14 January 2018; 18:00; King Power at Den Dreef Stadium; Leuven	Oud-Heverlee Leuven	3-1	Union SG	N. Gillekens; Daeseleire, Schuermans, Moore, Tshimanga; Persoons, Kehli, Maertens; Aguemon (67' Hubert), Casagolda (81' Diedhiou), Storm (76' Azevedo)	Bagayoko; Henkinet; Gorius; Mertens	(yellow card) 84' Persoons
14 January 2018; 18:00; King Power at Den Dreef Stadium; Leuven	18' Casagolda; 26' Tshimanga; 48' Storm	1-0; 2-0; 3-0; 3-1	57' Fixelles	N. Gillekens; Daeseleire, Schuermans, Moore, Tshimanga; Persoons, Kehli, Maertens; Aguemon (67' Hubert), Casagolda (81' Diedhiou), Storm (76' Azevedo)	Bagayoko; Henkinet; Gorius; Mertens	(yellow card) 84' Persoons
21 January 2018; 18:00; Stade Leburton; Tubize	Tubize	0-1	Oud-Heverlee Leuven	N. Gillekens; Daeseleire, Schuermans, Moore, Tshimanga; Kehli, Persoons, Maertens; Aguemon (68' Diedhiou), Casagolda (81' Hubert), Storm (60' Dequevy)	Bagayoko; Henkinet; Gorius; Mertens	(yellow card) 38' Aguemon
21 January 2018; 18:00; Stade Leburton; Tubize		0-1	73' Casagolda	N. Gillekens; Daeseleire, Schuermans, Moore, Tshimanga; Kehli, Persoons, Maertens; Aguemon (68' Diedhiou), Casagolda (81' Hubert), Storm (60' Dequevy)	Bagayoko; Henkinet; Gorius; Mertens	(yellow card) 38' Aguemon
26 January 2018; 20:30; King Power at Den Dreef Stadium; Leuven	Oud-Heverlee Leuven	0-1	Westerlo	N. Gillekens; Daeseleire (60' Boulenger), Schuermans, Moore, Tshimanga; Kehli, Persoons (74' Diedhiou), Maertens; Aguemon, Casagolda, Storm (46' Dequevy)	Henkinet; Gorius; Hubert; Mertens	
26 January 2018; 20:30; King Power at Den Dreef Stadium; Leuven		0-1	23' (o.g.) Daeseleire	N. Gillekens; Daeseleire (60' Boulenger), Schuermans, Moore, Tshimanga; Kehli, Persoons (74' Diedhiou), Maertens; Aguemon, Casagolda, Storm (46' Dequevy)	Henkinet; Gorius; Hubert; Mertens	
2 February 2018; 20:30; King Power at Den Dreef Stadium; Leuven	Oud-Heverlee Leuven	2-2	Cercle Brugge	N. Gillekens; Mertens (82' Kostovski), Schuermans, Moore, Tshimanga; Dequevy (70' Storm), Persoons, Maertens, Kehli; Casagolda, Diedhiou (60' Aguemon)	Henkinet; Boulenger; Gorius; Hubert	
2 February 2018; 20:30; King Power at Den Dreef Stadium; Leuven	72' Kehli 90+5' (p) Aguemon	0-1; 1-1; 1-2; 2-2	34' Cardona 77' Cardona	N. Gillekens; Mertens (82' Kostovski), Schuermans, Moore, Tshimanga; Dequevy (70' Storm), Persoons, Maertens, Kehli; Casagolda, Diedhiou (60' Aguemon)	Henkinet; Boulenger; Gorius; Hubert	
11 February 2018; 16:00; Herman Vanderpoortenstadion; Lier	Lierse	0-1	Oud-Heverlee Leuven	N. Gillekens; Mertens, Schuermans, Moore, Tshimanga; Dequevy (81' Boulenger), Persoons, Maertens, Aguemon (85' Storm); Casagolda (45' Gorius), Diedhiou	Thamsatchanan; Hubert; Kostovski; Libert	(yellow card) 39' N. Gillekens; (yellow card) 79' Mertens; (yellow card) 85' Aguemon
11 February 2018; 16:00; Herman Vanderpoortenstadion; Lier		0-1	41' Casagolda	N. Gillekens; Mertens, Schuermans, Moore, Tshimanga; Dequevy (81' Boulenger), Persoons, Maertens, Aguemon (85' Storm); Casagolda (45' Gorius), Diedhiou	Thamsatchanan; Hubert; Kostovski; Libert	(yellow card) 39' N. Gillekens; (yellow card) 79' Mertens; (yellow card) 85' Aguemon
17 February 2018; 20:30; King Power at Den Dreef Stadium; Leuven	Oud-Heverlee Leuven	1-1	Beerschot Wilrijk	Thamsatchanan; Libert, Schuermans, Boulenger, Tshimanga (66' Mertens); Gorius, Hubert, Kehli; Dequevy (69' Vekemans), Diedhiou (73' Kostovski), Storm	N. Gillekens; Daeseleire; J. Gillekens; Sowah	(yellow card) 61' Dequevy
17 February 2018; 20:30; King Power at Den Dreef Stadium; Leuven	87' Kostovski	0-1; 1-1	69' Losada	Thamsatchanan; Libert, Schuermans, Boulenger, Tshimanga (66' Mertens); Gorius, Hubert, Kehli; Dequevy (69' Vekemans), Diedhiou (73' Kostovski), Storm	N. Gillekens; Daeseleire; J. Gillekens; Sowah	(yellow card) 61' Dequevy
25 February 2018; 16:00; Schiervelde Stadion; Roeselare	Roeselare	1-1	Oud-Heverlee Leuven	Thamsatchanan; Libert, Schuermans, Boulenger; Aguemon, Hubert, Persoons, Gorius, Storm (84' Tshimanga); Kehli (83' Kostovski), Diedhiou (65' Vekemans)	N. Gillekens; Daeseleire; J. Gillekens; Mertens	(yellow card) 53' Persoons; (yellow card) 70' Hubert; (yellow card) 84' Schuermans
25 February 2018; 16:00; Schiervelde Stadion; Roeselare	90+4' Lecomte	0-1; 1-1	23' Storm	Thamsatchanan; Libert, Schuermans, Boulenger; Aguemon, Hubert, Persoons, Gorius, Storm (84' Tshimanga); Kehli (83' Kostovski), Diedhiou (65' Vekemans)	N. Gillekens; Daeseleire; J. Gillekens; Mertens	(yellow card) 53' Persoons; (yellow card) 70' Hubert; (yellow card) 84' Schuermans

== Europa League play-offs ==
OHL qualified for the Europa League play-offs based on their league position in the 2017–18 Belgian First Division B.

=== Results ===
Europa League play-offs
Match Details	Home team	Result	Away team	Lineup	Unused Subs	Bookings
Group A
1 April 2018; 20:00; Regenboogstadion; Waregem; Attendance: 5.951	Zulte Waregem	2-2	Oud-Heverlee Leuven	Thamsatchanan; Libert, Schuermans, Moore, Tshimanga; Gorius (78' Hubert), Maertens, Persoons (77' Kostovski); Aguemon (83' Vekemans), Diedhiou, Storm	N. Gillekens; Boulenger; Gilis; Mertens	(yellow card) 14' Schuermans; (red card) 57' Diedhiou; (yellow card) 79' Maertens; (yellow card) 90+2' Moore
1 April 2018; 20:00; Regenboogstadion; Waregem; Attendance: 5.951	15' Harbaoui 69' De Pauw	1-0; 1-1; 2-1; 2-2	35' Gorius 87' Kostovski	Thamsatchanan; Libert, Schuermans, Moore, Tshimanga; Gorius (78' Hubert), Maertens, Persoons (77' Kostovski); Aguemon (83' Vekemans), Diedhiou, Storm	N. Gillekens; Boulenger; Gilis; Mertens	(yellow card) 14' Schuermans; (red card) 57' Diedhiou; (yellow card) 79' Maertens; (yellow card) 90+2' Moore
7 April 2018; 20:00; King Power at Den Dreef Stadium; Leuven; Attendance: 3.375	Oud-Heverlee Leuven	1-2	Lierse	Thamsatchanan; Mertens, Schuermans, Moore, Tshimanga; Gorius, Hubert (83' Vekemans), Maertens; Dequevy (69' Aguemon), Casagolda (65' Kostovski), Storm	N. Gillekens; Libert; Persoons; Sowah	(yellow card) 34' Dequevy
7 April 2018; 20:00; King Power at Den Dreef Stadium; Leuven; Attendance: 3.375	73' Kostovski	0-1; 0-2; 1-2	26' Laurent; 71' Yagan	Thamsatchanan; Mertens, Schuermans, Moore, Tshimanga; Gorius, Hubert (83' Vekemans), Maertens; Dequevy (69' Aguemon), Casagolda (65' Kostovski), Storm	N. Gillekens; Libert; Persoons; Sowah	(yellow card) 34' Dequevy
14 April 2018; 20:00; Freethiel Stadion; Beveren; Attendance: 1.687	Waasland-Beveren	0-2	Oud-Heverlee Leuven	Thamsatchanan; Libert, Schuermans, Moore, Tshimanga; Gorius, Maertens, Persoons; Dequevy (84' Sowah), Kostovski (66' Casagolda), Storm (74' Gilis)	N. Gillekens; Aguemon; Hubert; Mertens	(yellow card) 42' Kostovski; (yellow card) 53' Tshimanga; (yellow card) 82' Gilis
14 April 2018; 20:00; Freethiel Stadion; Beveren; Attendance: 1.687		0-1; 0-2	23' Gorius; 54' Storm	Thamsatchanan; Libert, Schuermans, Moore, Tshimanga; Gorius, Maertens, Persoons; Dequevy (84' Sowah), Kostovski (66' Casagolda), Storm (74' Gilis)	N. Gillekens; Aguemon; Hubert; Mertens	(yellow card) 42' Kostovski; (yellow card) 53' Tshimanga; (yellow card) 82' Gilis
17 April 2018; 20:30; Guldensporen Stadion; Kortrijk; Attendance: 3.100	Kortrijk	2-1	Oud-Heverlee Leuven	Thamsatchanan; Libert (56' Gilis), Schuermans, Moore, Tshimanga; Gorius, Maertens, Persoons (72' Kehli); Dequevy (56' Aguemon), Kostovski, Storm	N. Gillekens; Casagolda; Hubert; Sowah	(yellow card) 25' Maertens; (yellow card) 37' Gorius; (yellow card) 79' Tshimanga; (yellow card) 90+2' Moore
17 April 2018; 20:30; Guldensporen Stadion; Kortrijk; Attendance: 3.100	12' (p) Chevalier; 38' (p) Chevalier	1-0; 2-0; 2-1	46' Kostovski	Thamsatchanan; Libert (56' Gilis), Schuermans, Moore, Tshimanga; Gorius, Maertens, Persoons (72' Kehli); Dequevy (56' Aguemon), Kostovski, Storm	N. Gillekens; Casagolda; Hubert; Sowah	(yellow card) 25' Maertens; (yellow card) 37' Gorius; (yellow card) 79' Tshimanga; (yellow card) 90+2' Moore
21 April 2018; 18:00; King Power at Den Dreef Stadium; Leuven; Attendance: 3.605	Oud-Heverlee Leuven	3-1	Excel Mouscron	Thamsatchanan; Libert, Schuermans, Moore, Tshimanga; Gorius, Maertens (65' Vekemans), Kehli; Sowah, Kostovski (84' Gilis), Storm (56' Aguemon)	N. Gillekens; Casagolda; Hubert; Mertens	
21 April 2018; 18:00; King Power at Den Dreef Stadium; Leuven; Attendance: 3.605	63' Aguemon; 69' (p) Aguemon; 72' Kehli	0-1; 1-1; 2-1; 3-1	51' Mbombo	Thamsatchanan; Libert, Schuermans, Moore, Tshimanga; Gorius, Maertens (65' Vekemans), Kehli; Sowah, Kostovski (84' Gilis), Storm (56' Aguemon)	N. Gillekens; Casagolda; Hubert; Mertens	
28 April 2018; 20:00; King Power at Den Dreef Stadium; Leuven; Attendance: 3.557	Oud-Heverlee Leuven	0-0	Waasland-Beveren	Thamsatchanan; Mertens, Schuermans, Libert, Tshimanga; Gorius, Maertens, Kehli (62' Vekemans); Sowah (57' Storm), Kostovski (82' Casagolda), Aguemon	N. Gillekens; Daeseleire; Hubert; Persoons	(yellow card) 61' Storm; (yellow card) 90' Mertens
5 May 2018; 20:00; Herman Vanderpoortenstadion; Lier; Attendance: 2.600	Lierse	2-2	Oud-Heverlee Leuven	Thamsatchanan; Libert, Schuermans, Moore, Tshimanga; Gorius, Persoons (71' Vekemans), Kehli; Dequevy (62' Maertens), Kostovski (71' Casagolda), Aguemon	N. Gillekens; Daeseleire; Hubert; Storm	(yellow card) 51' Dequevy
5 May 2018; 20:00; Herman Vanderpoortenstadion; Lier; Attendance: 2.600	12' Yagan; 55' Bourdin	0-1; 1-1; 2-1; 2-2	7' Aguemon 79' Schuermans	Thamsatchanan; Libert, Schuermans, Moore, Tshimanga; Gorius, Persoons (71' Vekemans), Kehli; Dequevy (62' Maertens), Kostovski (71' Casagolda), Aguemon	N. Gillekens; Daeseleire; Hubert; Storm	(yellow card) 51' Dequevy
8 May 2018; 20:30; King Power at Den Dreef Stadium; Leuven; Attendance: 3.574	Oud-Heverlee Leuven	0-2	Kortrijk	Thamsatchanan; Daeseleire (62' Gilis), Schuermans, Moore, Tshimanga; Hubert, Maertens (85' Dequevy), Vekemans; Aguemon, Casagolda (58' Kostovski), Kehli	N. Gillekens; Libert; Persoons; Sowah	(yellow card) 45+1' Aguemon
8 May 2018; 20:30; King Power at Den Dreef Stadium; Leuven; Attendance: 3.574		0-1; 0-2	45+1' Kovačević; 76' Perbet	Thamsatchanan; Daeseleire (62' Gilis), Schuermans, Moore, Tshimanga; Hubert, Maertens (85' Dequevy), Vekemans; Aguemon, Casagolda (58' Kostovski), Kehli	N. Gillekens; Libert; Persoons; Sowah	(yellow card) 45+1' Aguemon
11 May 2018; 20:30; King Power at Den Dreef Stadium; Leuven; Attendance: 4.058	Oud-Heverlee Leuven	1-2	Zulte Waregem	N. Gillekens; Libert, Schuermans, Moore, Tshimanga; Hubert, Gorius), Persoons (74' Vekemans); Gilis (69' Aguemon), Kostovski (80' Casagolda), Kehli	Thamsatchanan; Daeseleire; Dequevy; Maertens	
11 May 2018; 20:30; King Power at Den Dreef Stadium; Leuven; Attendance: 4.058	31' Gorius	0-1; 1-1; 1-2	5' Coopman 82' Hämäläinen	N. Gillekens; Libert, Schuermans, Moore, Tshimanga; Hubert, Gorius), Persoons (74' Vekemans); Gilis (69' Aguemon), Kostovski (80' Casagolda), Kehli	Thamsatchanan; Daeseleire; Dequevy; Maertens	
18 May 2018; 20:30; Stade Le Canonnier; Mouscron	Excel Mouscron	5-0	Oud-Heverlee Leuven	N. Gillekens; Libert, Schuermans, Moore, Dequevy; Hubert (46' Daeseleire), Gorius), Persoons; Sowah, Kostovski (67' Casagolda), Kehli (46' Maertens)	Thamsatchanan; Aguemon; Gilis; Vekemans	(yellow card) 29' Schuermans; (yellow card) 32' Hubert; (yellow card) 43' Dequevy
18 May 2018; 20:30; Stade Le Canonnier; Mouscron	6' Mbombo; 20' Spahiu; 24' Amallah; 42' C. Diedhiou; 44' Mohamed	1-0; 2-0; 3-0; 4-0; 5-0		N. Gillekens; Libert, Schuermans, Moore, Dequevy; Hubert (46' Daeseleire), Gorius), Persoons; Sowah, Kostovski (67' Casagolda), Kehli (46' Maertens)	Thamsatchanan; Aguemon; Gilis; Vekemans	(yellow card) 29' Schuermans; (yellow card) 32' Hubert; (yellow card) 43' Dequevy

== Belgian Cup ==
=== Results ===
2017–18 Belgian Cup
Match Details	Home team	Result	Away team	Lineup	Cards
Round 5
27 August 2017; 16:00; King Power at Den Dreef Stadium (Note: Although OH Leuven was originally drawn away to Turnhout, both clubs agreed to reverse the fixture.); Leuven; Attendance: 1.488; Report	Oud-Heverlee Leuven	8-0	Turnhout	N. Gillekens; Daeseleire (46' Mertens), Moore, Schuermans, Bagayoko; Maertens (46' Berben), Hubert, Aguemon; Azevedo, Watt, Storm (58' Casagolda)	
27 August 2017; 16:00; King Power at Den Dreef Stadium; Leuven; Attendance: 1.488; Report	5' Maertens; 15' Storm; 28' Storm; 30' Watt; 36' Azevedo; 77' Mertens; 79' Casagolda; 90' Moore	1-0; 2-0; 3-0; 4-0; 5-0; 6-0; 7-0; 8-0		N. Gillekens; Daeseleire (46' Mertens), Moore, Schuermans, Bagayoko; Maertens (46' Berben), Hubert, Aguemon; Azevedo, Watt, Storm (58' Casagolda)	
Round 6
19 September 2017; 20:30; Stayen; Sint-Truiden; Report	Sint-Truiden	4-2 (a.e.t.)	Oud-Heverlee Leuven	N. Gillekens; Boulenger, Moore, Schuermans, Tshimanga (55' Berben); Hubert, Persoons, Bagayoko; Azevedo (69' Mertens), Diedhiou (90' Maertens), Storm	(yellow card) 34' (yellow-red card) 87' Boulenger; (yellow card) 37' Moore; (yellow card) 52' Persoons; (yellow card) 59' (yellow-red card) 65' Schuermans; (yellow card) 52' Maertens
19 September 2017; 20:30; Stayen; Sint-Truiden; Report	4' Botaka 104' Goutas 107' Vetokele; 112' Vetokele	1-0; 1-1; 2-1; 2-2; 3-2; 4-2	56' Persoons 105+2' Storm	N. Gillekens; Boulenger, Moore, Schuermans, Tshimanga (55' Berben); Hubert, Persoons, Bagayoko; Azevedo (69' Mertens), Diedhiou (90' Maertens), Storm	(yellow card) 34' (yellow-red card) 87' Boulenger; (yellow card) 37' Moore; (yellow card) 52' Persoons; (yellow card) 59' (yellow-red card) 65' Schuermans; (yellow card) 52' Maertens

== Squad statistics ==
=== Appearances ===
Players with no appearances not included in the list.

No.	Pos.	Nat.	Name	First Division B		Belgian Cup		Europa League play-offs		Total	
No.	Pos.	Nat.	Name	Apps	Starts	Apps	Starts	Apps	Starts	Apps	Starts
1	GK	(Belgium)	Nick Gillekens	24	24	2	2	2	2	28	28
2	DF	(Belgium)	Dimitri Daeseleire	23	23	1	1	2	1	26	25
3	DF	(Belgium)	Derrick Tshimanga	19	16	1	1	9	9	29	26
4	DF	(Belgium)	Kenneth Schuermans	27	27	2	2	10	10	39	39
5	DF	(England)	Elliott Moore	24	24	2	2	9	9	35	35
6	MF	(Belgium)	David Hubert	19	16	2	2	5	4	26	22
7	MF	(France)	Yannick Aguemon	24	22	1	1	8	4	33	27
8	MF	(France)	Flavien Le Postollec	2	0	0	0	0	0	2	0
9	FW	(Belgium)	Esteban Casagolda	23	20	1	0	7	2	31	22
11	MF	(Belgium)	Nikola Storm	28	25	2	2	6	5	36	32
15	MF	(Ghana)	Kamal Sowah	0	0	0	0	3	2	3	2
16	GK	(Thailand)	Kawin Thamsatchanan	2	2	0	0	8	8	10	10
17	MF	(France)	Julien Gorius	12	5	0	0	9	9	21	14
18	FW	(Belgium)	Jo Gilis	0	0	0	0	5	1	5	1
19	MF	(France)	Samy Kehli	6	6	0	0	7	6	13	12
20	FW	(Senegal)	Simon Diedhiou	18	7	1	1	1	1	20	9
22	FW	(Belgium)	Daan Vekemans	2	0	0	0	7	1	9	1
23	FW	(North Macedonia)	Jovan Kostovski	6	2	0	0	10	7	16	9
24	MF	(Belgium)	Jarno Libert	13	9	0	0	8	8	21	17
25	DF	(Belgium)	Jenthe Mertens	8	5	2	0	2	2	12	7
26	GK	(Belgium)	Laurent Henkinet	3	2	0	0	0	0	3	2
27	DF	(Belgium)	Jordy Gillekens	2	2	0	0	0	0	2	2
28	MF	(Belgium)	Koen Persoons	22	20	1	1	6	6	29	27
30	MF	(Belgium)	Joeri Dequevy	5	3	0	0	6	5	11	8
31	DF	(France)	Benjamin Boulenger	10	5	1	1	0	0	11	6
32	FW	(Scotland)	Tony Watt	11	5	1	1	0	0	12	6
33	MF	(Belgium)	Mathieu Maertens	26	26	2	1	9	7	37	34
Players that have appeared this season, who are out on loan or have left OH Leuven
10	MF	(Belgium)	Geert Berben (on loan at Oosterzonen Oosterwijk)	1	0	2	0	0	0	3	0
14	MF	(Belgium)	Thomas Azevedo (on loan at Lommel)	13	5	2	2	0	0	15	7
18	DF	(Ivory Coast)	Mamadou Bagayoko (on loan at Mechelen)	13	7	2	2	0	0	15	9

=== Goalscorers ===
Includes all competitive matches.

Rank	Pos.	No.	Player	First Division B	Belgian Cup	Europa League play-offs	Total
1	FW	7	(France) Yannick Aguemon	10	0	3	13
2	FW	19	(Belgium) Esteban Casagolda	10	1	0	11
3	MF	11	(Belgium) Nikola Storm	6	3	1	10
4	MF	17	(France) Julien Gorius	1	0	3	4
4	FW	23	(North Macedonia) Jovan Kostovski	1	0	3	4
4	MF	33	(Belgium) Mathieu Maertens	3	1	0	4
7	DF	4	(Belgium) Kenneth Schuermans	2	0	1	3
7	DF	5	(England) Elliott Moore	2	1	0	3
9	MF	14	(Belgium) Thomas Azevedo (Note: Player who left OH Leuven that has appeared this season.)	1	1	0	2
9	MF	19	(France) Samy Kehli	1	0	1	2
9	MF	28	(Belgium) Koen Persoons	1	1	0	2
9	FW	32	(Scotland) Tony Watt	1	1	0	2
13	DF	2	(Belgium) Derrick Tshimanga	1	0	0	1
13	FW	20	(Senegal) Simon Diedhiou	1	0	0	1
13	MF	24	(Belgium) Jarno Libert	1	0	0	1
13	DF	25	(Belgium) Jenthe Mertens	0	1	0	1
Own Goals				1 (Note: Own-goal scored for OHL by Ibrahima Ba)	0	0	1
Total				43	10	12	65

=== Clean sheets ===
Includes all competitive matches.

No.	Player	First Division B	Belgian Cup	Europa League play-offs	TOTAL
1	(Belgium) Nick Gillekens	7	1	0	8
16	(Thailand) Kawin Thamsatchanan	0	0	2	2
26	(Belgium) Laurent Henkinet	1	0	0	1
