= Lierse S.K. =

Lierse S.K. may refer to:

- Lierse SK (1906), a defunct football club in Belgium
- Lierse SK (2018), an active football club in Belgium, formerly called Lierse Kempenzonen.
