= Marvin Ogunjimi =

Belgian footballer (born 1987)

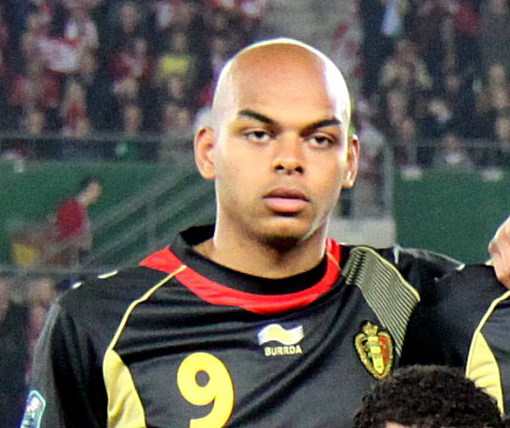
- Ogunjimi with Belgium in 2011

Personal information
- Date of birth: 12 October 1987 (age 39)
- Place of birth: Mechelen, Belgium
- Height: 1.85 m (6 ft 1 in)
- Position: Forward

Team information
- Current team: RSCA Futures (assistant)

Youth career
- 1997–1999: Rapid Leest
- 1999–2001: Roosendaal
- 2001–2003: Racing Mechelen
- 2003–2004: Mechelen

Senior career*
Years	Team	Apps	(Gls)
2004–2011	Genk	84	(30)
2007–2008	→ Waalwijk (loan)	27	(10)
2011–2014	Mallorca	7	(0)
2012	→ Standard Liège (loan)	3	(0)
2013	→ Beerschot (loan)	10	(1)
2013–2014	→ OH Leuven (loan)	18	(0)
2014–2015	Strømsgodset	19	(8)
2016	Suwon	10	(3)
2016	→ Ratchaburi Mitr Phol (loan)	7	(1)
2017	Skënderbeu Korçë	6	(0)
2017	Okzhetpes	7	(0)
2017–2018	MVV Maastricht	13	(1)
2018	Dinamo Brest	3	(0)
2018	Sài Gòn	7	(0)
2019	Lierse Kempenzonen	18	(3)
2019–2020	Patro Eisden	14	(0)
2021–2022	Mons	0	(0)

International career
2004–2005	Belgium U18	2	(0)
2006	Belgium U19	8	(0)
2010–2011	Belgium	7	(5)
- * Club domestic league appearances and goals as of 19:29, 29 April 2020 (UTC)

Marvin Ogunjimi (born 12 October 1987) is a Belgian former professional footballer who played as a forward. Until 2011, he played for the Belgium national team earning seven caps. He is currently the assistant coach of Challenger Pro League club RSCA Futures.

== Club career ==
=== Genk ===
Born in Mechelen, Ogunjimi made his professional debut with Racing Genk during the 2005–06 season. In 2007, he went on loan, playing for RKC Waalwijk. While with Waalwijk he appeared in 27 games and scored 10 goals. Upon returning to Genk, Ogunjimi became a prominent player for the Belgian side helping the club to the domestic title in the 2010–11 season. He also scored both of their goals as they won the 2009 Belgian Cup Final. In the Summer of 2011 Ogunjimi was supposed to be transferred last minute to RCD Mallorca but the papers arrived 7 minutes too late at FIFA so the transfer was refused.

=== Mallorca ===
On 14 November 2011, Mallorca announced Ogunjimi's move to their side. On 31 August 2012, he joined Standard Liège on a loan deal. In mid-February 2014, Ogunjimi signed for the New England Revolution on trial until the end of the month.

=== Strømsgodset ===
On 6 June 2014, Ogunjimi signed for Strømsgodset. The new club reportedly paid a small fee to Mallorca. He got his first match against Steaua in the second round of Champions League qualifications on 16 July 2014. On 2 August the same year, he scored in his home league debut match against Sogndal IL, which ended 1–1. He scored another three goals in the next three matches. Following this, he struggled under manager David Nielsen, and went 11 matches without scoring in the league. When new manager Bjørn Petter Ingebretsen took over, he put his faith in Ogunjimi, and the Belgian finally found the net on 21 June 2015. He scored four goals in three matches in the league, and one in the Europa League qualifications in June and July 2015, before he got injured in the second leg of the first qualifying round of the Europa League. On 14 July 2015, Strømsgodset announced that Ogunjimi had torn the anterior cruciate ligament in his left knee, and would miss the rest of the 2015 season.

=== Suwon FC ===
Ogunjimi signed for Suwon FC on 12 February 2016 and was loaned from July 2016 to Ratchaburi Mitr Phol. Upon return his contract was terminated by mutual consent as Suwon FC had suffered relegation.

=== Skënderbeu Korçë ===
On 1 February 2017, Ogunjimi signed for Skënderbeu Korçë until the end of December 2017. He made his first Albanian Superliga appearance one month later on 4 March in team's 1–1 home draw versus Teuta Durrës, playing the last 27 minutes as a substitute. His first and only start would come only on the final matchday against Partizani Tirana, playing for 60 minutes as Skënderbeu drew 2–2 at home, failing to retain the Albanian Superliga for the first time in five years. Following the end of 2016–17 which saw the team losing the championship for the first time in six years and losing the Albanian Cup final to Tirana, Ogunjimi was released after going goalless in seven appearances, including six in league, of which one was as a starter.

=== Okzhetpes ===
On 17 June 2017, FC Okzhetpes announced the signing of Ogunjimi.

== International career ==
On 8 October 2010, he made his international debut for Belgium against Kazakhstan in Astana, coming on at half-time and scoring twice in a 2–0 victory. Only four days later, in his second appearance against Austria, Ogunjimi started and scored a goal to tie the game at 3–3 in the 87th minute, as the match finished in a thrilling 4–4 tie.

== Career statistics ==
=== Club ===
As of match played 10 September 2016

Appearances and goals by club, season and competition
Club	Season	League			National cup (Note: Includes Belgian Cup, Copa del Rey, Norwegian Cup)		Continental		Other		Total	
Club	Season	Division	Apps	Goals	Apps	Goals	Apps	Goals	Apps	Goals	Apps	Goals
Genk	2005–06	Belgian First Division	8	0	0	0	1 (Note: Appearance in UEFA Cup)	0	—		8	0
Genk	2006–07	Belgian First Division	0	0	0	0	—		—		0	0
Genk	2008–09	Belgian First Division	17	3	4	2	—		—		21	5
Genk	2009–10	Belgian Pro League	29	12	1	1	1 (Note: Appearance(s) in UEFA Europa League)	0	0	0	31	13
Genk	2010–11	Belgian Pro League	32	15	2	1	4	2	—		38	18
Genk	2011–12	Belgian Pro League	6	0	0	0	5 (Note: Appearances in UEFA Champions League)	1	0	0	11	1
Genk	Total		92	30	7	4	11	3	0	0	110	37
RKC Waalwijk (loan)	2007–08	Eredivisie	27	10	0	0	—		—		27	10
Mallorca	2011–12	La Liga	7	0	1	0	—		—		8	0
Standard Liège (loan)	2012–13	Belgian Pro League	3	0	2	0	—		—		5	0
Beerschot (loan)	2012–13	Belgian Pro League	10	1	0	0	—		—		10	1
Leuven (loan)	2013–14	Belgian Pro League	18	0	0	0	—		—		18	0
Strømsgodset	2014	Tippeligaen	11	4	0	0	2	0	—		13	4
Strømsgodset	2015	Tippeligaen	8	4	1	0	2	1	—		11	5
Strømsgodset	Total		19	8	1	0	0	0	4	1	24	9
Suwon FC	2016	K League Classic	8	3	0	0	—		—		8	3
Ratchaburi (loan)	2016	Thai League	7	1	0	0	—		—		7	1
Career total			185	52	10	4	15	4	0	0	210	60

=== International ===
Appearances and goals by national team and year
National team	Year	Apps	Goals
Belgium	2010	2	3
Belgium	2011	5	1
Total		7	4

Scores and results list Belgium's goal tally first, score column indicates score after each Ogunjimi goal.

List of international goals scored by Marvin Ogunjimi
No.	Date	Venue	Opponent	Score	Result	Competition	Ref.
1	8 October 2010	Astana Arena, Astana, Kazakhstan	Kazakhstan	1–0	2–0	UEFA Euro 2012 qualifying	
2	8 October 2010	Astana Arena, Astana, Kazakhstan	Kazakhstan	2–0	2–0	UEFA Euro 2012 qualifying	
3	12 October 2010	King Baudouin Stadium, Brussels, Belgium	Austria	3–3	4–4	UEFA Euro 2012 qualifying	
4	3 June 2011	King Baudouin Stadium, Brussels, Belgium	Turkey	1–0	1–1	UEFA Euro 2012 qualifying	

== Honours ==
Racing Genk

- Belgian Pro League: 2010–11
- Belgian Cup: 2008–09
- Belgian Supercup: 2011
