= 2009 Belgian Cup final =

- Event: 2008–09 Belgian Cup
Genk	KV Mechelen
2	0
- Date: 23 May 2009
- Venue: King Baudouin Stadium, Brussels
- Referee: Frank De Bleeckere
- Attendance: 45,000

The 2009 Belgian Cup final, named Cofidis Cup after the sponsor, was played on Saturday, 23 May 2009 between Genk and KV Mechelen and won by Genk with 2–0. It was the 54th Belgian Cup Final.

== Road to the Final ==
Genk		Round	Mechelen	
Seraing [D3] H 6–0	Dugary 12'; Nemec 42', 45', 69'; Soetaers 61'; Bošnjak 75'	Round Six	Veldwezelt [D3] H 4–2	Vleminckx 68', 90', 90'; Rossini 85'
Lokeren [D1] H 1–0	Vossen 35'	Round Seven	Anderlecht [D1] H 2–1	Vleminckx 18' (pen.); Mununga 50'
Gent [D1] A 0–1		Quarter Finals; First Leg	Kortrijk [D1] H 1–0	Persoons 74'
Gent [D1] H 2–0 (AET)	Vossen 32'; Alex 96' (pen.)	Quarter Finals; Second Leg	Kortrijk [D1] A 0–0	
Lierse [D2] H 2–2	Barda 13'; De Mul 74' (pen.)	Semi-finals; First Leg	Cercle Brugge [D1] A 1–2	Vleminckx 82'
Lierse [D2] A 4–1	De Mul 47', 90'; Huysegems 53', 88'	Semi-finals; Second Leg	Cercle Brugge [D1] H 2–1 (AET) p.s.: 5–3	Vleminckx 28'; Mununga 68'

- Both clubs received a bye to round six.
- In square brackets is a letter that represents the opposition's division
  - [D1] = Belgian First Division
  - [D2] = Belgian Second Division
  - [D3] = Belgian Third Division

== Match details ==
23 May 2009
20:45 CET

Genk	2–0	KV Mechelen
Ogunjimi 42', 62'

King Baudouin Stadium, Brussels
Attendance: 45.000
Referee: Frank De Bleeckere

Genk	Mechelen

GENK:
GK	1	(Belgium) Davino Verhulst
DF	3	(Belgium) David Hubert	(yellow card) 30'
DF	5	(Cameroon) Eric Matoukou	(yellow card) 43'
DF	12	(Belgium) Dimitri Daeseleire		(substituted off) 60'
DF	30	(Brazil) João Carlos (c)
MF	16	(South Africa) Anele	(yellow card) 27'	(substituted off) 76'
MF	6	(Brazil) Ederson
MF	33	(Czech Republic) Daniel Pudil	(yellow card) 57'	(substituted off) 89'
FW	18	(Israel) Elyaniv Barda
FW	17	(Belgium) Stein Huysegems
FW	21	(Belgium) Marvin Ogunjimi	(yellow card) 63'
Substitutes:
GK	26	(Belgium) Sem Franssen
FW	7	(Belgium) Kevin De Bruyne
MF	10	(Belgium) Tom Soetaers		(substituted on) 89'
FW	19	(Belgium) Jelle Vossen
DF	23	(Belgium) Hans Cornelis	(yellow card) 90'	(substituted on) 60'
FW	32	(Slovakia) Adam Nemec
MF	88	(Hungary) Dániel Tőzsér		(substituted on) 76'
Manager:
(Belgium) Pierre Denier

MECHELEN:
GK	23	(Belgium) Olivier Renard
DF	8	(Belgium) Xavier Chen
DF	3	(Belgium) Jonas Ivens (c)
DF	4	(Belgium) Jeroen Mellemans	(red card) 25'
DF	17	(Ghana) Nana Asare	(yellow card) 52'
MF	11	(Belgium) Joachim Mununga		(substituted off) 76'
MF	25	(Belgium) Wouter Vrancken		(substituted off) 66'
MF	6	(Belgium) Koen Persoons
MF	15	(France) Julien Gorius
FW	18	(Belgium) Bjorn Vleminckx	(yellow card) 90'
MF	26	(Belgium) Kristof Imschoot		(substituted off) 46'
Substitutes:
GK	20	(Belgium) Wouter Biebauw
DF	2	(France) David Grondin
MF	7	(Belgium) Kenneth Van Goethem
FW	9	(Belgium) Giuseppe Rossini		(substituted on) 66'
MF	13	(Croatia) Antun Dunković		(substituted on) 76'
MF	19	(Belgium) Maxime Biset		(substituted on) 46'
DF	22	(Belgium) Romeo Van Dessel
Manager:
(Belgium) Peter Maes

Match rules

- 90 minutes
- 30 minutes of extra-time if necessary
- Penalty shoot-out if scores still level
- Maximum 7 named substitutes
- Maximum of 3 substitutions

== See also ==
- 2008–09 Belgian Cup
