= Nikola Storm =

Belgian footballer (born 1994)

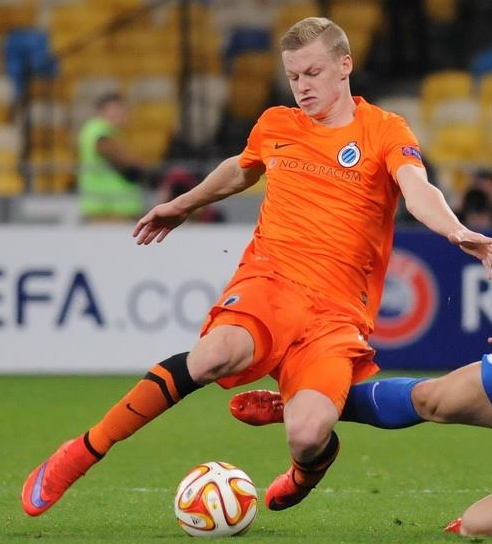
- Storm playing for Club Brugge in 2015

Personal information
- Date of birth: 30 September 1994 (age 32)
- Place of birth: Maldegem, Belgium
- Height: 1.78 m (5 ft 10 in)
- Position: Winger

Team information
- Current team: Westerlo
- Number: 10

Youth career
- 2001–2004: KSK Maldegem
- 2004–2008: Lokeren
- 2008–2013: Club Brugge

Senior career*
Years	Team	Apps	(Gls)
2013–2018	Club Brugge	34	(0)
2015–2016	→ Zulte Waregem (loan)	17	(0)
2017–2018	→ OH Leuven (loan)	47	(9)
2018–2025	Mechelen	215	(48)
2025–2026	Antalyaspor	32	(5)
2026–	Westerlo	3	(1)

International career
2009–2010	Belgium U16	3	(1)
2011	Belgium U17	6	(1)
2011–2012	Belgium U18	4	(0)
2012–2013	Belgium U19	5	(0)
- * Club domestic league appearances and goals as of 20 September 2026

Nikola Storm (born 30 September 1994) is a Belgian professional footballer who plays for Belgian Pro League club Westerlo as a winger.

== Career ==
Storm made his professional debut in the Belgian Pro League for Club Brugge against KV Mechelen in a 3–0 home win replacing Maxime Lestienne after 75 minutes on 7 December 2013.

He scored his first goal with Mechelen against Gent in the 2019 Belgian Cup Final which ended in a 2–1 win.

On 3 September 2026, Storm returned to Belgium and signed a two-season contract with Westerlo.

== Career statistics ==
As of match played 3 March 2023

Appearances and goals by club, season and competition
Club	Season	League			Belgian Cup		Europe		Other		Total	
Club	Season	Division	Apps	Goals	Apps	Goals	Apps	Goals	Apps	Goals	Apps	Goals
Club Brugge	2013–14	Belgian Pro League	3	0	0	0	0	0	–		3	0
Club Brugge	2014–15	Belgian Pro League	22	0	6	2	7 (Note: Appearances in UEFA Europa League)	0	–		35	2
Club Brugge	2015–16	Belgian Pro League	4	0	0	0	0	0	–		4	0
Club Brugge	2016–17	Belgian First Division A	5	0	1	0	0	0	0	0	6	0
Club Brugge	Total		34	0	7	2	7	0	0	0	48	2
Zulte Waregem (loan)	2015–16	Belgian Pro League	17	0	1	0	–		–		18	0
OH Leuven (loan)	2016–17	Belgian First Division B	13	2	0	0	–		–		13	2
OH Leuven (loan)	2017–18	Belgian First Division B	34	7	2	3	–		–		36	10
OH Leuven (loan)	Total		47	9	2	3	–		–		49	12
Mechelen	2018–19	Belgian First Division B	28	5	6	2	–		2 (Note: Appearances in Belgian First Division B promotion play-offs)	1	36	8
Mechelen	2019–20	Belgian First Division A	27	5	0	0	–		1 (Note: Appearance in Belgian Super Cup)	0	28	5
Mechelen	2020–21	Belgian First Division A	34	12	2	0	–		–		35	12
Mechelen	2021–22	Belgian First Division A	38	15	3	1	–		–		41	16
Mechelen	2022–23	Belgian First Division A	25	4	5	1	–		–		30	5
Mechelen	Total		152	41	16	4	–		3	1	171	46
Career total			250	50	26	9	7	0	3	1	286	60

== Honours ==
Club Brugge

- Belgian Super Cup: 2016

Mechelen

- Belgian Cup: 2018–19
- Belgian First Division B: 2018–19
