= Geert Berben =

Belgian footballer (born 1993)

Personal information
- Full name: Geert Berben
- Date of birth: 26 May 1993 (age 33)
- Place of birth: Bocholt, Belgium
- Height: 1.75 m (5 ft 9 in)
- Position: Attacking midfielder

Team information
- Current team: Unico Tongeren

Youth career
- –2011: Bocholter VV

Senior career*
Years	Team	Apps	(Gls)
2011–2014	Bocholter VV	99	(18)
2014–2015	ASV Geel	46	(4)
2015–2017	Lommel United	35	(3)
2017–2018	OH Leuven	1	(0)
2018	→ KFC Oosterzonen (loan)	8	(0)
2018–2019	Lommel	5	(0)
2019–2020	Patro Eisden	10	(2)
2020	Roeselare	0	(0)
2021–2022	Hasselt	0	(0)
2022–2023	Tongeren	0	(0)
2023–2024	Schoonbeek-Beverst	0	(0)
2024–	Unico Tongeren	0	(0)
- * Club domestic league appearances and goals as of 19:09, 29 April 2020 (UTC)

Geert Berben (born 26 May 1993) is a Belgian footballer who plays as an attacking midfielder for Unico Tongeren in the Belgian Provincial Leagues.
