= Ibrahima Ba (footballer, born 1984) =

Senegalese footballer (born 1984)

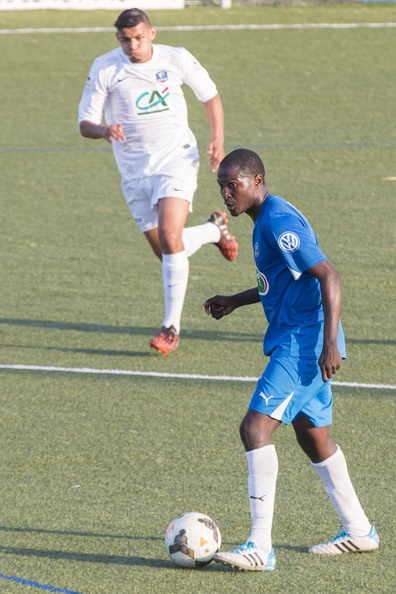
- Ibrahima Ba in 2014.

Personal information
- Full name: Ibrahima Ba
- Date of birth: 23 November 1984 (age 41)
- Place of birth: Dakar, Senegal
- Height: 1.80 m (5 ft 11 in)
- Position: Attacking midfielder

Senior career*
Years	Team	Apps	(Gls)
2003–2005	CS Sfaxien	?	(?)
2006	→ FC Thun (loan)	9	(1)
2006–2007	Al-Hilal	3	(2)
2007–2008	FC Thun	22	(2)
2008–2009	AS Kasserine	?	(?)
2009–2011	Stade Tunisien	17	(0)
2011	Kazma	?	(?)
2011–2015	Istres	81	(2)
2015	Arles-Avignon	20	(0)
2015–2018	Tubize	72	(3)
2019	Seraing	1	(0)
2019–2021	Limoges		
- * Club domestic league appearances and goals

Ibrahima Ba (born 23 November 1984) is a Senegalese former professional footballer who played as a midfielder.

== Career ==
Ba played for Istres from 2011 and 2015. Ba joined Championnat National 3 club Limoges FC on 12 June 2019.
