= Simon Diedhiou =

Senegalese footballer

Personal information
- Full name: Aristide Simon Pierre Diedhiou
- Date of birth: 10 July 1991 (age 35)
- Place of birth: Dakar, Senegal
- Height: 1.81 m (5 ft 11 in)
- Positions: Striker; winger

Team information
- Current team: Al-Faisaly

Senior career*
Years	Team	Apps	(Gls)
2008–2014	Diambars		
2015–	Haugesund	29	(9)
2016–2017	Gent	4	(0)
2016–2017	→ Royal Mouscron-Péruwelz (loan)	35	(6)
2017–2019	OH Leuven	11	(1)
2020–2021	Diambars		
2021–2024	US Touarga		
2024–	Al-Faisaly		
- * Club domestic league appearances and goals as of 14 January 2018

Aristide Simon Pierre Diedhiou (born 10 July 1991) is a Senegalese professional footballer who plays as a striker for Al-Faisaly in the Jordanian Pro League.

== Career ==
In March 2015, Diedhiou signed for Norwegian Tippeligaen side FK Haugesund on a four-year contract. On 4 January 2016, Diedhiou signed for Belgium Belgian Pro League side Gent. He joined Royal Mouscron-Péruwelz from Gent on a one-year loan in June 2016, with Mouscron securing an option to sign him permanently.

== Career statistics ==
As of match played 4 March 2016

Club	Season	League			National Cup		Continental		Other		Total	
Club	Season	Division	Apps	Goals	Apps	Goals	Apps	Goals	Apps	Goals	Apps	Goals
Haugesund	2015	Tippeligaen	29	9	2	1	-		-		31	10
Gent	2015–16	Belgian Pro League	3	0	1	0	0	0	-		4	0
Career total			32	9	3	1	-	-	-	-	35	10
