= Jenthe Mertens =

Belgian footballer

Personal information
- Date of birth: 18 October 1999 (age 27)
- Place of birth: Genk, Belgium
- Height: 1.81 m (5 ft 11 in)
- Position: Right-back

Team information
- Current team: Lierse
- Number: 66

Youth career
- Cobox 76
- 2006–2009: Genk
- 2009–2014: MVV Maastricht
- 2014–2017: OH Leuven

Senior career*
Years	Team	Apps	(Gls)
2017–2019	OH Leuven	16	(0)
2019–2020	Go Ahead Eagles	24	(2)
2020–2024	Beveren	51	(2)
2023	→ Real Monarchs (loan)	5	(0)
2024–2025	Vaduz	20	(0)
2025–	Lierse	24	(6)
- * Club domestic league appearances and goals as of 20 April 2026

Jenthe Mertens (born 18 October 1999) is a Belgian professional footballer who plays as a right-back for Challenger Pro League club Lierse.

== Career ==
Mertens made his professional debut for OH Leuven on 5 August 2017 in the home match against Lierse.

=== Go Ahead Eagles ===
On 2 September 2019, it was confirmed that Mertens had joined Go Ahead Eagles on a contract until the summer 2020 with an option for one further year.

=== Vaduz ===
On 10 May 2024, Mertens signed a two-year contract with Swiss Challenge League club Vaduz in Liechtenstein.

=== Lierse ===
On 23 July 2025, Mertens moved to Lierse on a two-season deal.
