= Herman Vanderpoortenstadion =

Multi-use stadium in Lier, Belgium

AsterX Group-f Arena
- Het Lisp
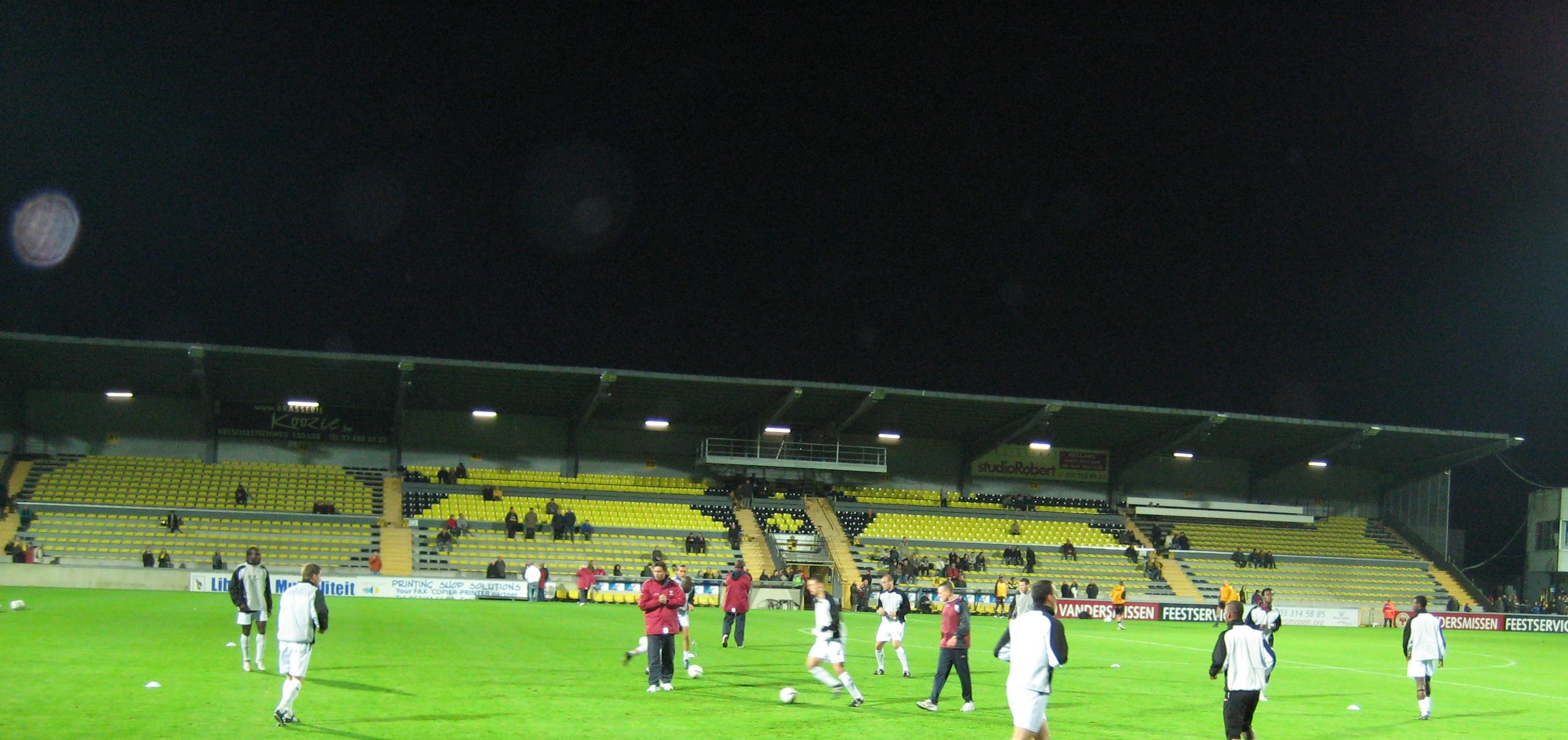
- Interactive map of AsterX Group-f Arena
- Former names: Lisperstadion, Herman Vanderpoortenstadion
- Location: Lier, Belgium
- Coordinates: 51°08′39″N 4°34′25″E
- Capacity: 14,538
- Surface: Grass

Construction
- Opened: 1925
- Renovated: 2000, 2009

Tenant
- Lierse Kempenzonen

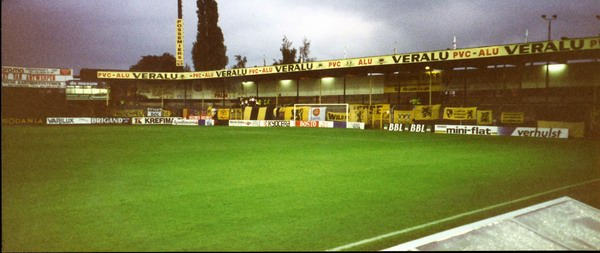
The stadium in 1999, before the renovation.

Herman Vanderpoortenstadion (Dutch pronunciation: [ˈɦɛrmɑɱ vɑndərˈpoːrtə(n)ˌstaːdijɔn]), also called Het Lisp (Dutch pronunciation: [ət ˈlɪsp]), is a multi-use stadium in Lier, Belgium. It is currently used mostly for football matches and was the home ground of Lierse between 1925 and 2018. The stadium holds 14,538, including 4,311 standing places, 522 business seats, 102 VIP seats and 3 loges. Following the bankruptcy of Lierse in 2018, it is unclear who will be the new tenants.

It is located along the Lispersesteenweg, the road leading to Lisp, the neighbourhood of Lier where the club is located. The stadium is named after Herman Vanderpoorten, a Belgian politician, former mayor of Lier between 1982 and 1984.

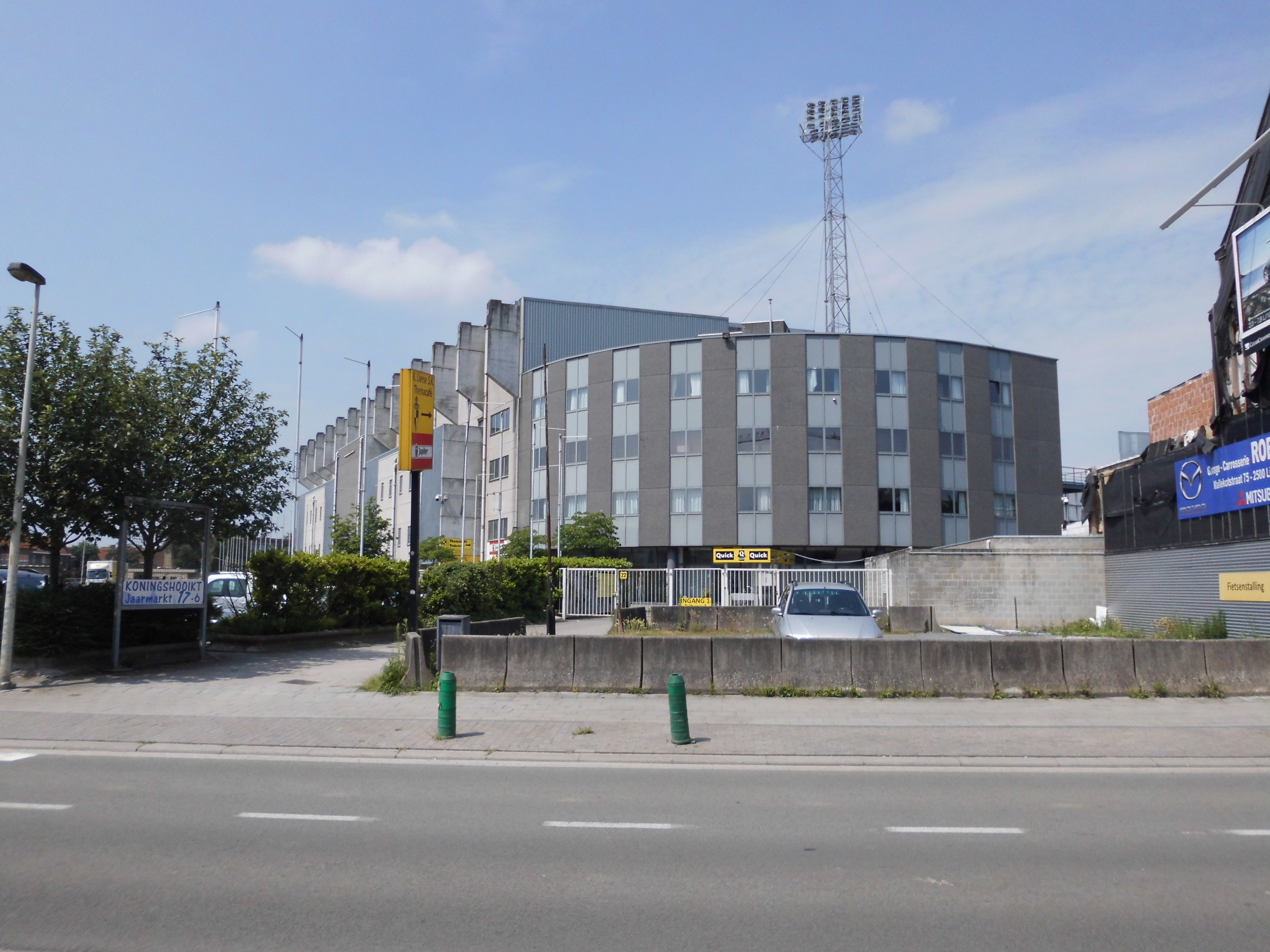
Stadium Lierse anno 2018
