= David Hubert =

Belgian footballer

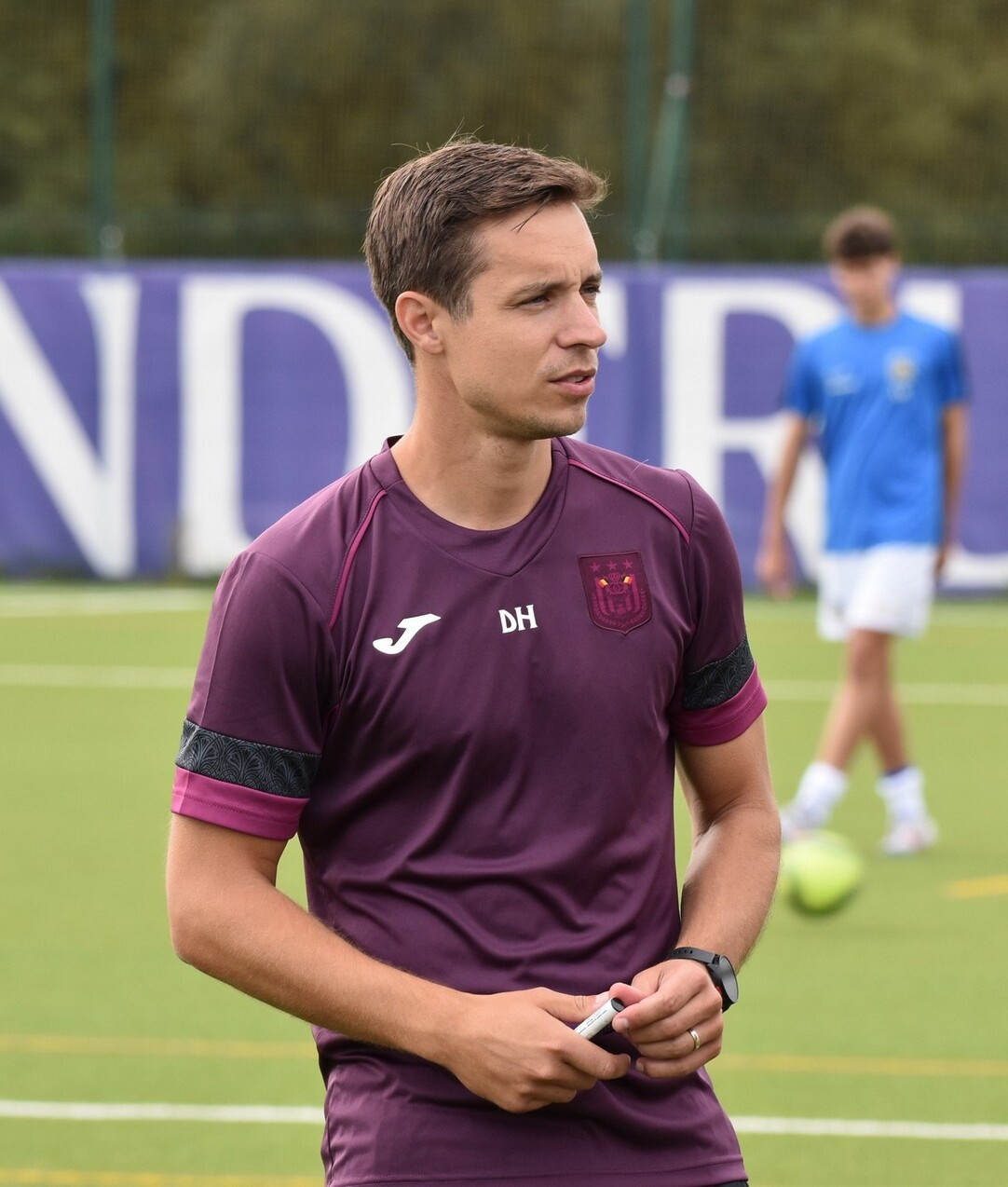
- Hubert as youth coach at Anderlecht in 2024

Personal information
- Date of birth: 12 February 1988 (age 38)
- Place of birth: Uccle, Belgium
- Height: 1.84 m (6 ft 0 in)
- Position: Defensive midfielder

Team information
- Current team: Union SG (head coach)

Youth career
- –1994: ERC Hoeilaart
- 1994–1999: KV Mechelen
- 1999–2007: Genk

Senior career*
Years	Team	Apps	(Gls)
2007–2013	Genk	120	(2)
2013	→ Gent (loan)	17	(0)
2013–2017	Gent	13	(0)
2014	→ Hapoel Be'er Sheva (loan)	16	(0)
2014–2015	→ Waasland-Beveren (loan)	22	(0)
2015–2017	→ Royal Mouscron-Péruwelz (loan)	56	(4)
2017–2021	OH Leuven	83	(2)
2021–2022	Zulte Waregem	20	(0)
2022–2023	RSCA Futures	29	(2)

International career
2007–2008	Belgium U20	3	(3)
2008–2010	Belgium U21	4	(0)
2011	Belgium	2	(0)

Managerial career
- 2024–2025: Anderlecht
- 2025: OH Leuven
- 2025–: Union SG
- * Club domestic league appearances and goals

David Hubert (born 12 February 1988) is a Belgian football manager and former player who is currently head coach Belgian Pro League side Union SG. A defensive midfielder, he played for clubs in Belgium and Israel and made two appearances for the Belgium national team.

== Career ==
Born in Brussels-Capital Region, Hubert was raised in Uccle, suburban Brussels. Hubert made his debut with Genk in February 2008 in the match against K.V.C. Westerlo. In 2009, he won the Belgian Cup against KV Mechelen. On 19 May 2011, he was called up to the Belgium national team for the European Championship qualifier against Turkey.

During the 2010–11 season he captained the team winning the Jupiler Pro League. In the summer of 2011, after winning the Belgian Supercup, he managed to qualify for the UEFA Champions League after winning against Maccabi Haifa.

In January 2013, he joined Gent on a six-month loan deal after which he signed a four-year agreement. He later spent several loan spells before joining OH Leuven and Zulte Waregem.

On 13 August 2022, Hubert signed with Anderlecht to play for their reserve team RSCA Futures in the second-tier Challenger Pro League.

== Coaching career ==
=== Anderlecht ===
After retiring in 2023, Hubert joined Anderlecht as assistant coach for RSCA Futures and the U18 team. Following the 2023–24 season, he was promoted to head coach of the U18s. In September 2024, he became interim head coach of Anderlecht's first team, replacing Brian Riemer. Despite mixed league results, he impressed in the Europa League and was confirmed as permanent head coach in October 2024. However, inconsistent performances led to his dismissal in March 2025.

=== OH Leuven ===
In June 2025, Hubert became head coach of Oud-Heverlee Leuven, a club he had played for between 2017 and 2021. He signed a contract until mid-2027 but endured a poor start to the 2025–26 season, with OHL ranking second-to-last in October after achieving only two wins in ten matches.

=== Union Saint-Gilloise ===
In mid-October 2025, reigning Belgian champions Union Saint-Gilloise appointed Hubert as their new head coach, after Sébastien Pocognoli left for Monaco.

== Managerial statistics ==
As of 22 November 2026

Managerial record by team and tenure
Team	From	To	Record				
Team	From	To	G	W	D	L	Win %
Anderlecht	19 September 2024	19 March 2025	38	20	7	11	52.63
OH Leuven	16 June 2025	13 October 2025	10	2	2	6	20.00
Union SG	13 October 2025	present	62	39	15	8	62.90
Career total			110	61	24	25	55.45

== Honours ==
=== Player ===
Genk

- Belgian Pro League: 2010–11
- Belgian Cup: 2008–09
- Belgian Supercup: 2011

=== Managerial ===
Union SG

- Belgian Cup: 2025–26
