= Flavien Le Postollec =

Footballer (born 1984)

Personal information
- Full name: Flavien Le Postollec
- Date of birth: 19 February 1984 (age 42)
- Place of birth: Abidjan, Ivory Coast
- Height: 1.82 m (5 ft 11 1/2 in)
- Position: Midfielder

Team information
- Current team: Deinze (assistant)

Youth career
- 2003–2004: Vitrolles
- 2004–2005: FC Martigues

Senior career*
Years	Team	Apps	(Gls)
2005–2007	Lille	1	(0)
2007	→ FC Brussels (loan)		
2007–2010	FC Brussels	41	(1)
2010–2011	US Créteil	36	(2)
2011–2012	Eupen	33	(3)
2012–2014	Mons	45	(2)
2014–2018	OH Leuven	71	(0)
2018–2021	Deinze	70	(4)
- * Club domestic league appearances and goals as of 21:02, 4 May 2021 (UTC)

Flavien Le Postollec (born 19 February 1984) is an Ivorian-Breton retired footballer who last played as a midfielder for Deinze in the Belgian First Division B. He is currently employed as an assistant manager at Deinze.

Le Postollec began his professional football career with Lille OSC, and went on loan to FC Brussels in 2007.

He moved to France at a young age.
