= Benjamin Boulenger =

French footballer (born 1990)

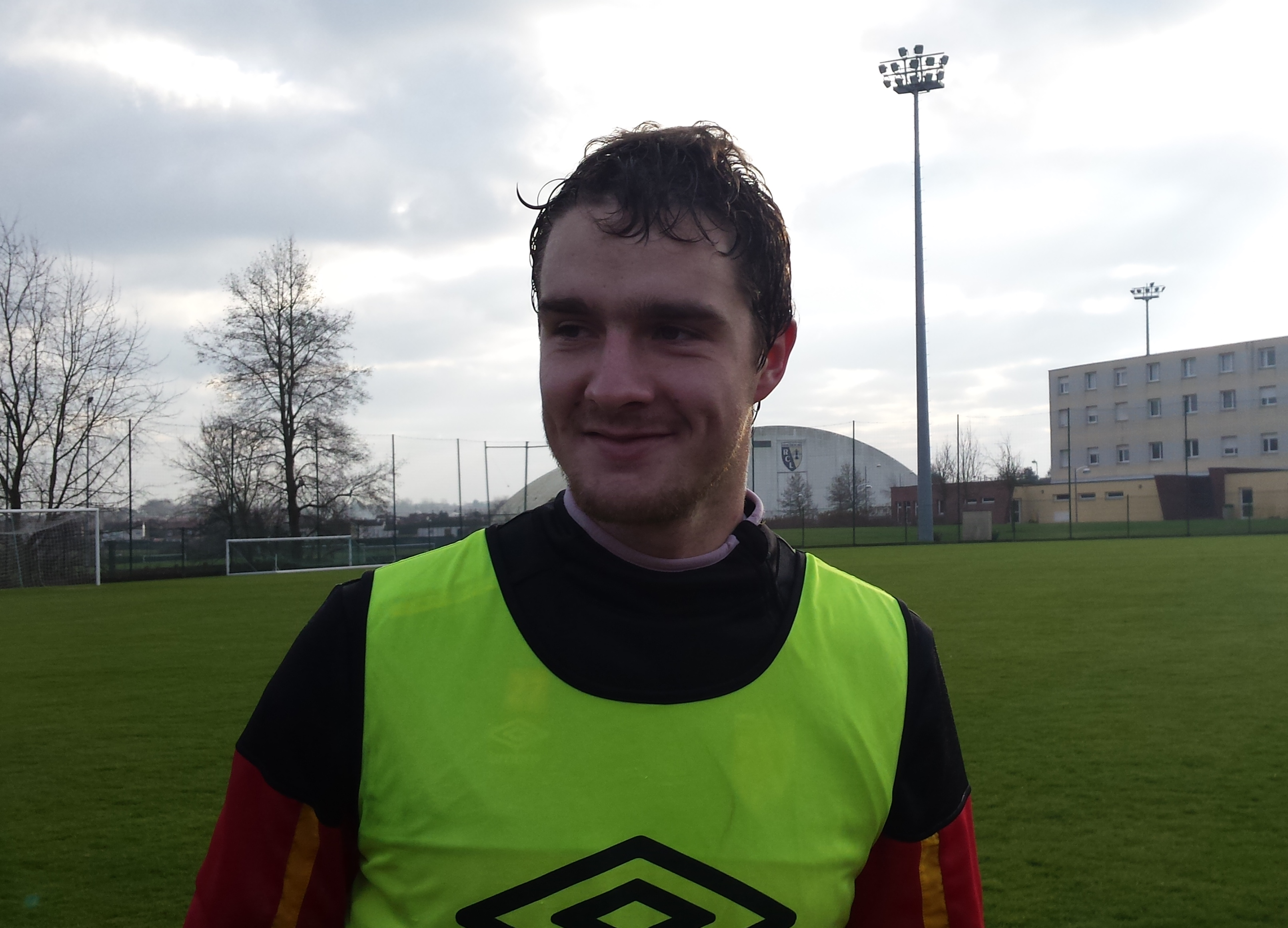
- Boulenger with Lens in 2014

Personal information
- Date of birth: 1 March 1990 (age 36)
- Place of birth: Maubeuge, France
- Height: 1.88 m (6 ft 2 in)
- Position: Left-back

Youth career
- Aulnoye
- Boulogne

Senior career*
Years	Team	Apps	(Gls)
2011–2013	Boulogne	34	(3)
2013–2015	Lens	15	(1)
2015–2019	Sporting Charleroi	7	(0)
2017–2018	→ OH Leuven (loan)	10	(0)
2019–2022	Seraing	63	(5)
2022–2024	Francs Borains	30	(3)
- * Club domestic league appearances and goals as of 11:29, 19 January 2025 (UTC)

Benjamin Boulenger (born 1 March 1990) is a French professional footballer who plays as a left-back. He is currently a free agent, having last played for Challenger Pro League club Francs Borains.

== Career ==
=== Boulogne ===
Boulenger started his career with Division d'Honneur club Aulnoye before joining Boulogne. He was initially a part of the reserve team, before being promoted to the first team competing in Ligue 2 ahead of the 2011–12 season. After a season where he mainly appeared as a substitute, he became a starter the following season in National after Boulogne's relegation.

=== Lens ===
After being contacted by Jocelyn Blanchard, Boulenger joined Ligue 2 club Lens in August 2013 on an amateur contract. He became a part of the club's reserve team playing in National 2. Boulenger made his professional debut for the first team on 11 November 2013 in a 2–2 away draw against Chamois Niortais, replacing Pablo Chavarría, and scoring his first goal a few seconds after coming on.

Lens received a recruitment ban in 2014 due to irregularities in the club's proposed budget, which meant that Boulenger could not sign a professional contract. Alongside Samuel Atrous, he spent six months without a team and waited until December 2014 for a six-month contract to be offered and approved.

=== Sporting Charleroi ===
On 26 May 2015, he left Lens, who had just been relegated to Ligue 2, and signed with Belgian Pro League club Sporting Charleroi on a two-year deal with an option for an additional year. He made his debut for the club, as well as his European debut, on 23 July 2015, replacing Neeskens Kebano in the 68th minute of a 4–1 win in the UEFA Europa League over Beitar Jerusalem. A long-time reserve, he only made his league debut on 23 April 2016, during his club's 4–0 victory against Mechelen.

On 1 September 2017, Boulenger was sent on a one-season loan with an option to buy to OH Leuven competing in the second-tier Proximus League.

After returning to Sporting Charleroi, his situation did not improve and despite his contract running for one more season, until June 2019, he was placed in the reserve team and was asked to look for a new club. He failed to find a new club, and stayed with Charleroi until the expiry of his contract.

=== Seraing ===
Boulenger joined Seraing on 19 September 2019, signing a one-year contract with an option for another year with the club competing in the third-tier Belgian First Amateur Division. He was part of the team winning two promotions in a row, reaching the top level Belgian Pro League in 2021.

=== Francs Borains ===
In the summer of 2022, Boulenger signed with Francs Borains in the third-tier Belgian National Division 1. He made his competitive debut on 17 August, coming on as a substitute in the 66th minute of a 2–0 home win against Young Reds Antwerp. He played 32 matches in his first season, helping the club secure promotion to the Challenger Pro League.

In mid-2023, a routine fitness test revealed cardiac arrhythmia, requiring surgery in September. He suffered a relapse in November, sidelining him for several months. Although he returned to training in March 2024, he did not play during the 2023–24 season and subsequently left the club.

== Career statistics ==
As of match played 20 May 2023

Appearances and goals by club, season and competition
Club	Season	League			National cup (Note: Includes Coupe de France, Belgian Cup)		League cup (Note: Includes Coupe de la Ligue)		Europe		Other		Total	
Club	Season	Division	Apps	Goals	Apps	Goals	Apps	Goals	Apps	Goals	Apps	Goals	Apps	Goals
Boulogne	2011–12	Ligue 2	1	0	0	0	1	0	—		—		2	0
Boulogne	2012–13	Championnat National	33	3	2	0	1	0	—		—		36	3
Boulogne	Total		34	3	2	0	2	0	—		—		38	3
Boulogne B	2012–13	National 2	2	0	—		—		—		—		2	0
Lens B	2013–14	CFA	13	0	—		—		—		—		13	0
Lens B	2014–15	CFA	1	0	—		—		—		—		1	0
Lens B	Total		14	0	—		—		—		—		14	0
Lens	2013–14	Ligue 2	2	1	4	0	—		—		—		6	1
Lens	2014–15	Ligue 1	13	0	1	0	—		—		—		14	0
Lens	Total		15	1	5	0	—		—		—		20	1
Sporting Charleroi	2015–16	Belgian Pro League	1	0	1	0	—		2 (Note: Appearance(s) in UEFA Europa League)	0	—		4	0
Sporting Charleroi	2016–17	Belgian Pro League	6	0	1	0	—		—		—		7	0
Sporting Charleroi	Total		7	0	2	0	—		2	0	—		11	0
OH Leuven (loan)	2017–18	First Division B	10	0	1	0	—		—		—		11	0
Seraing	2019–20	First Amateur Division	18	3	1	0	—		—		—		19	3
Seraing	2020–21	First Division B	21	2	1	0	—		—		1 (Note: Appearance in 2020–21 Belgian First Division promotion-relegation play-off)	0	23	2
Seraing	2021–22	First Division A	24	0	1	0	—		—		2 (Note: Appearance in 2021–22 Belgian First Division promotion-relegation play-off)	0	27	0
Seraing	Total		63	5	3	0	—		—		3	0	69	5
Francs Borains	2022–23	National Division 1	30	4	2	0	—		—		—		32	4
Francs Borains	2023–24	Challenger Pro League	0	0	0	0	—		—		—		0	0
Francs Borains	Total		30	4	2	0	—		—		—		32	4
Career total			175	13	15	0	2	0	2	0	3	0	197	13
