= Leo Njengo =

Belgian footballer

Personal information
- Full name: Charita Leopold Njengo Mandeng
- Date of birth: 16 August 1994 (age 32)
- Place of birth: Antwerp, Belgium
- Height: 1.73 m (5 ft 8 in)
- Position: Left winger

Youth career
- –2013: Genk

Senior career*
Years	Team	Apps	(Gls)
2013–2014	Operário	3	(0)
2014	Naval	11	(0)
2014–2015	Trofense	13	(0)
2015–2016	Westerlo	0	(0)
2016	Dessel Sport	16	(8)
2017–2019	OH Leuven	2	(0)
2017–2018	→ Dessel Sport (loan)	22	(1)
2019	→ Heist (loan)	12	(0)
2019–2020	URSL Visé	6	(0)
2020	Cappellen	0	(0)
2021	Slavia Mozyr	3	(0)
2022	Lokeren-Temse	12	(1)
2023–2024	Cappellen	14	(0)
- * Club domestic league appearances and goals as of 31 May 2024

Leo Njengo (born 16 August 1994) is a Belgian former professional footballer.
