= Julien Gorius =

French footballer (born 1985)

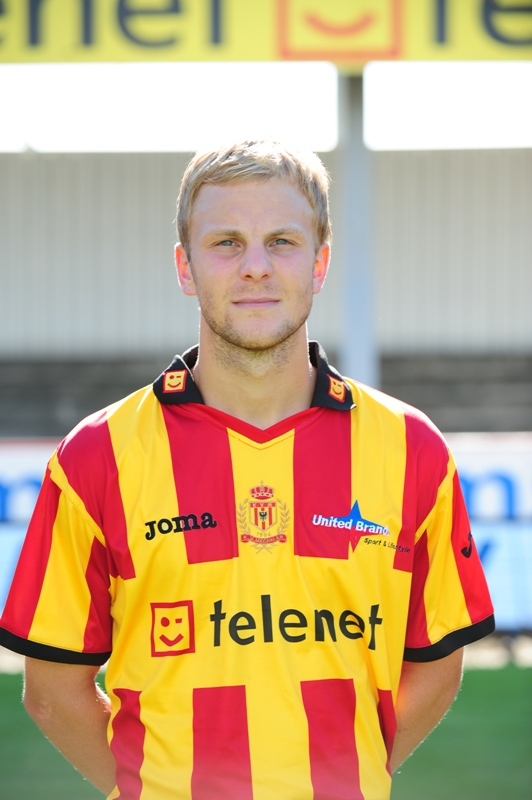
- Gorius pictured during his time at KV Mechelen

Personal information
- Full name: Julien Gorius
- Date of birth: 17 March 1985 (age 41)
- Place of birth: Metz, France
- Height: 1.80 m (5 ft 11 in)
- Position: Midfielder

Team information
- Current team: RWDM47 (Sporting Director)

Youth career
- FC Metz

Senior career*
Years	Team	Apps	(Gls)
2003–2005	FC Metz	3	(0)
2005–2008	Brussels	92	(15)
2008–2012	KV Mechelen	94	(28)
2012–2016	Genk	107	(19)
2016	Changchun Yatai	12	(1)
2017–2019	OH Leuven	25	(4)
- * Club domestic league appearances and goals as of 16 August 2015 ‡ National team caps and goals as of 19 November 2006

Julien Gorius (born 17 March 1985) is a former French professional footballer who used to be sporting director for RWDM47 in the Belgian First Division B.

Having started his career at FC Metz, Gorius spent most of his career playing in Belgium, playing in the top–flight football. He moved to China, ending his eleven years spell in the country. However, it didn't last long and Gorius returned to Belgium to join OH Leuven, where he stayed there for two years. After leaving the club, he announced his retirement from professional football in 2019.

== Club career ==
=== Metz ===
Born in Metz, France, Gorius started his career at FC Metz since he was five and progressed through the youth team and reserve side. Gorius reflected on his time at the club, saying: "I was trained at Metz and got my technical knowledge. The French youth work is top. The emphasis is on making progress. Talent can develop better there."

Gorius then made his Metz debut on 23 May 2004, where he played 20 minutes after coming on as a substitute in the second half, in a 3–1 loss against Ajaccio in the last game of the season. Following this, Gorius signed his first professional contract with the club. However, Gorius struggled to make a breakthrough in the first team, as well as, facing his own injury concerns. At the end of the 2004–05 season, after just three appearances in all competitions, the club decided against extending his contract. Following this, Gorius, along with Jean-Philippe Caillet, went on trial at FC Saarbrücken and played a match.

=== Brussels ===
In July 2005, Gorius moved to Belgium when he was signed for Brussels by Manager Albert Cartier and was a replacement for Bjørn Helge Riise, who moved back to his native country.

Gorius made his Brussels debut, in the opening game of the season, where he played the whole game, in a 2–0 win over Beveren. Since joining the club, Gorius became a first team regular for the club, playing in the midfield position. He then scored his first goal for Brussels on 19 November 2005, in a 3–1 win over Standard Liège. In his first season at the club, Gorius made thirty–two appearances and scoring once in all competitions.

In his second season at Brussels, Gorius started the season well when he set up the equalising goal and then scored his first goal of the season, in a 2–2 draw against Sint-Truidense on 19 August 2006. This was followed up by setting up the winning goal for Dieudonné Kalulika, in a 1–0 win against Lierse. Since the start of the 2006–07 season, he continued to established himself in the starting eleven, playing in the midfield position. Two months later on 22 October 2006, Gorius scored his second goal of the season, in a 3–1 loss against K.V. Kortrijk in the sixth round of Beker van België. Six days later on 28 October 2006, he scored twice for Brussels, as the club drew 3–3 against Gent. Gorius scored his first goals in five months, in a 4–1 loss against Club Brugge on 17 March 2007. He later scored two more goals, coming against Roeselare and Genk. Despite missing three matches through injuries and suspension during the 2006–07 season, he went on to make thirty–three appearances and scoring eight times in all competitions. Following this, Gorius extended a contract with the club for another three years.

At the start of the 2007–08 season, Gorius continued to establish himself in the starting eleven, playing in the midfield position. He then scored his first goal of the season, in a 2–0 win over Sint-Truidense on 22 September 2007. By the end of 2007, Gorius went on to score two more goals against Dender and Cercle Brugge. On 19 January 2008, he scored twice for Brussels, in a 7–2 loss against Westerlo. Gorius later added two more goals later in the season against Mons and Mechelen. Throughout the 2007–08 season, the club struggled in the top–flight league, ultimately resulted in their relegation. Despite facing setbacks with injuries and suspension along the way, Gorius went on to score seven times (in which he was the club's top–scorer in the 2007–08 season) in thirty–two appearances in all competitions, although he suffered setback, due to injury and suspension. In the summer transfer of 2008, Gorius invoked a clause that can allowed him to leave the club, as he expressed his desire not to play in the Second Division.

=== KV Mechelen ===
On 18 July 2008, Gorius returned to top–flight football in Belgium when he joined KV Mechelen, signing a four–year contract with the club. Prior to the move, Gorius hinted of staying in Belgium to join a different club despite being linked with a move back in his homeland.

He made his debut for the club, starting a match and played 80 minutes, in a 3–1 loss against Mouscron in the opening game of the season. A month later on 20 September 2008, Gorius scored his first goal for KV Mechelen and setting up the winning goal, in a 2–1 win over Gent. However, during the match, he suffered ankle injury and was sidelined for weeks. On 18 October 2008, Gorius made his return to the first team, coming on as a 72nd-minute substitute, in a 3–1 loss against Westerlo. Having suffered a bad start to his Mechelen's career, he continued to be involved in the first team, with his playing time coming from the substitute bench. After going on a sixteen matches without scoring, Gorius finally scored a goal against Tubize on 7 February 2009, as the club won 5–1. He then scored two goals in two matches between 27 February 2009 and 7 March 2009 against Genk and Westerlo. A month later on 4 April 2009, Gorius scored his fifth goal for Mechelen, in a 1–1 draw against Kortrijk He played in both legs of the Beker van België semi–finals against Cercle Brugge and scored the penalty in the shootout, as the club won 5–3 on penalties to advance to the final. After missing a match through suspension on the last game of the season, Gorius returned to the starting line–up against Genk in the final, as Mechelen lost 1–0. His performance was praised by the Belgium media, Het Nieuwsblad. At the end of the 2008–09 season, he finished his first season at Mechelen, making thirty–four appearances and scoring five times in all competitions.

Gorius started the 2009–10 season well when he scored in the opening game of the season, in a 4–1 win over Westerlo. Gorius scored two more goals by the end of August, coming against Club Brugge and Germinal Beerschot. Since the start of the 2009–10 season, he continued to establish himself in the starting eleven, playing in the midfield position. Gorius also began taking responsibilities by becoming the club's penalty taker. He added three more goals by the end of the year, all coming from penalties. His next goal came on 16 January 2010, in a 2–1 win over Roeselare, which was followed up by scoring twice, in a 3–2 win over Westerlo in the quarter–final of the Beker van België first leg. However, Gorius suffered an injury that saw him miss one match; up until then, he started in every match since the start of the 2009–10 season. Gorius returned to the starting line–up against Westerlo in the return leg in the Beker van België quarter–final and helped Mechelen draw 0–0 to advance to the next round. Two weeks later on 9 February 2010, he scored once in the Beker van België match against Gent in the first leg of the semi–finals, as the club drew 2–2. A month later on 7 March 2010, Gorius scored against Gent for the second time this season, as Mechelen drew 2–2. Despite missing two more matches in the UEFA Europa League play-offs, he scored three more goals, as Mechelen finished second place behind Westerlo, failing to finish first place. At the end of the 2009–10 season, Gorius made thirty–eight appearances and scoring fourteen times in all competitions, making him the club's top scorer this season. For his performance, he was awarded the Most Deserving Player of the Year by the club's supporters.

In the 2010–11 season, Gorius started the season well when he scored in the opening game of the season, in a 2–0 win over Lokeren. Three weeks later on 22 August 2010, Gorius scored his second goal of the season, in a 2–1 win against Club Brugge, However, he was required to wear a mask after suffering an injury. Despite this, Gorius continued to establish himself in the starting eleven, playing in the midfield position since the start of the 2010–11 season. His third goal of the season came on 22 September 2010 against Cercle Brugge, as Mechelen drew 2–2. He scored five goals in three matches, including two braces against Germinal Beerschot and Racing Waregem. Following his good performance in the first half of the season, Gorius signed a contract extension with the club, keeping him until 2014. He then scored three goals out of Mechelen's four matches between 2 February 2011 and 15 February 2011 against Kortrijk, Cercle Brugge and Lierse. Gorius added two more goals throughout March against Standard Liège and Eupen. In the UEFA Europa League play-offs, he added three more goals, coming against Cercle Brugge and Lierse, as Mechelen finished third place. At the end of the 2010–11 season, Gorius scored sixteen times (where he was top scorer for the second time for the club) in thirty–eight appearances in all competitions.

Ahead of the 2011–12 season, Gorius was linked with a move return to France throughout the summer from such clubs as Lens, and two unnamed Belgium clubs, which one of them revealed to be Standard Liège. He ended up staying at Mechelen by signing a new contract, keeping him until 2016. Gorius started the 2011–12 season well when he scored three goals in the first five league matches against Sint-Truiden, Lierse and OH Leuven. He made his 100th appearance for the club, coming against Genk, as Mechelen drew 0–0 on 27 August 2011. However, Gorius injured his right abductors that saw him sidelined between three and four weeks. He scored on his return from injury against Cercle Brugge, as the club lost 2–1 on 15 October 2011. Following this, Gorius’ goal scoring form continued by the end of the year, scoring against Beerschot, Gent, Zulte Waregem and Lierse. Since the start of the 2011–12 season, he continued to captain the club, as well as, regaining his first team place. Gorius later scored five more goals between 14 January 2012 and 21 March 2012, coming against Mons, Genk, Beerschot, Westerlo and Standard Liege. Gorius then captained Mechelen, as the club finished fourth place in the UEFA Europa League play-offs. During which, he scored twice against OH Leuven, which saw Mechelen lost 4–2 on 21 April 2012. At the end of the 2011–12 season, Gorius finished the season, scoring fifteen times (where he was top scorer for the third time) in thirty–five appearances in all competitions.

=== Genk ===
On 1 May 2012, it was announced that Gorius was transferred to league rivals side Genk for an undisclosed fee, signing a four–year contract with a one–year option. He was previously in a transfer subject from to the club when they made a move for him in January, but Mechelen rejected a move from Genk for him.

Gorius made his Genk debut, in the opening game of the season against Cercle Brugge and played the whole game, in a 3–3 draw. Three days later on 2 August 2012, he made his UEFA Europa League debut, starting the whole game, in a 2–1 win over Aktobe in the first leg. Nine days later on 9 August 2012, Gorius set up the club's equalising goal, as Genk won 2–1 in the return leg to advance to the next round. His first goal for the club came on 26 August 2012 against Zulte Waregem, in a 2–0 win. Since the start of the 2012–13 season, he established himself in the starting eleven, playing in the midfield position. A month later on 23 September 2012, Gorius scored his second goal for Genk, as the club won2–1 against Charleroi, which was followed up in the next match by assisting twice, in a 2–1 win against his former club, Mechelen. He later added two more goals by the end of the year, coming against RAEC Mons, Lierse and Zulte Waregem. At the beginning of the year, Gorius struggled to score for the next two months, as well as, his form. Eventually, his ten matches goal drought ended on 9 March 2013 when he scored in a 3–2 win over Gent, which was followed up, with a 5–1 win over RAEC Mons. Gorius helped Genk reach the final of Beker van België after the club beat Anderlecht 7–6 in a penalty shootout, in which he successfully scored the first penalty. After suffering a hamstring injury, he returned to the first team as a late substitute in the Beker van België’s final against Cercle Brugge, as the club won 2–0 to win his first trophy. Seven days later on 16 May 2013, Gorius scored his eighth goal of the season, in a 1–1 draw Standard Liège, which saw Genk finish in third place in the play–offs. In his first season at Genk, he went on to make fifty–four appearances and scoring eight times in all competitions.

At the start of the 2013–14 season, Gorius made his first appearance of the season against Anderlecht in the Belgian Super Cup when he started the whole game, as Genk lost 1–0. Gorius started the season well when he provided two assists in the first two matches of the season against Oostende and OH Leuven. However, Gorius was dropped in the next three matches between 17 August 2013 and 1 September 2013. He returned to the starting line–up against Zulte Waregem on 15 September 2013 and scored his first goal of the season, in a 5–2 win. This was followed up by scoring once again, in a 1–0 win against Dynamo Kyiv in the UEFA Europa League match. Two weeks later on 28 September 2013, Gorius scored his third goal of the season in a 1–0 win against his former club, Mechelen, which was followed up by scoring against Thun in another UEFA Europa League match. Following this, he regained his first team place, playing in the midfield position. Gorius later added four more goals, coming against Rapid Wien, RAEC Mons and OH Leuven (twice) by the end of the year. However, he suffered an injury in the 28th minute and was substituted as a result, as the club lost 1–0 in the return leg of Beker van België quarter–finals. After missing one match, Gorius returned to the starting line–up against Gent on 26 January 2014, starting a match and played 79 minutes before being substituted, in a 2–1 loss. Gorius then scored three more goals against Lierse, RAEC Mons and Kortrijk (twice). He helped Genk finish in third place once again after the club. In his second season at Genk, Gorius went on to score twelve times in forty–nine appearances in all competitions.

At the start of the 2014–15 season, Gorius continued to remain in the first team at the club, playing in the midfield position. In a match against Kortrijk on 16 August 2014, he set up the equalising goal for Genk, as the club drew 1–1. Gorius then scored his first goal of the season, in a 3–1 win over Westerlo on 19 October 2014. However, during a 3–0 win against his former club Mechelen on 23 November 2014, he suffered a muscle tear in the quadriceps and was substituted in the first half, which saw him sidelined throughout the whole year. Gorius returned to the starting line–up against Lokeren on 18 January 2015 and helped Genk draw 1–1. However, his return was short–lived when he suffered an illness that saw him miss one match. His return came on 3 February 2015 against Oostende when Gorius started the whole game to help the club draw 1–1. Ten days later on 13 February 2015, he set up a winning goal for Kara Mbodji, in a 2–1 win against Westerlo. In a match against Zulte Waregem on 7 March 2015, Gorius set up two goals, including another winning goal for Mbodji, in a 3–2 win. However, he suffered a hamstring injury that saw him out for one match. Gorius returned to the starting line–up against his former club, Mechelen, on 24 April 2015 and helped Genk win 1–0, in what turned out to be his 100th appearance for the club. This was followed by scoring his second goal of the season, as well as, setting up one of the club's goals, in a 7–1 win over Waasland-Beveren. At the end of the 2014–15 season, he finished the season, making thirty–one appearances and scoring two times in all competitions.

At the start of the 2015–16 season, Gorius started the season well when he scored his first goal of the season, in a 3–1 win over OH Leuven in the opening game of the season. Gorius’ second goal for Genk came on 28 August 2015 against Charleroi, as well as, setting up the second goal of the game, in a 2–0 win. However, his first team opportunities was limited under the new management of Peter Maes and was reduced to the substitute bench for the first half of the season, as well as, his own injury concern. By the time he left the club, Gorius went on to make thirteen appearances and scoring two times in all competitions.

=== Changchun Yatai ===
After spending 10 years in Belgium, Gorius moved to China on 23 February 2016 when he joined Chinese Super League side Changchun Yatai for an undisclosed fee. Gorius was previously linked with a move to Turkish side Bursaspor before moving to China.

Gorius made his debut for Changchun Yatai, in the opening game of the season, in a 2–1 loss against Hangzhou Greentown, where he played 33 minutes after coming on as a substitute in the second half. Gorius then scored his first Changchun Yatai goal to score the only goal in the game, in a 1–0 win over Shijiazhuang Ever Bright on 29 May 2016. However, with twelve appearances and scoring once, Gorius was sent to the reserve to keep himself fit for the rest of the season following the arrivals of new foreigner players, Mislav Oršić and Bruno Meneghel in the summer. At the end of the season, Gorius was released by the club after spending one season there.

After leaving China, Gorius later reflecting his time at China, stating that it was difficult to do well there. Following this, Gorius was linked a return move to Belgium when both of his former clubs, Mechelen and Genk, were keen on signing him.

=== OH Leuven ===
On 13 June 2017, OH Leuven, playing in the Belgian First Division B, announced they had signed Gorius on a two-year deal. Upon joining the club, he said: "To start with, I put OH Leuven on the line of most first division teams."

Gorius made his debut for the club, starting the match as captain, in a 2–2 draw against Lierse in the opening game of the season. After a month without playing, Manager Nigel Pearson said about the player's absent: "He already played with the reserves for an hour this week, and is ready to play tonight." Gorius made his return to the first team, coming on as a 65th-minute substitute, in a 2–0 win against Roeselare on 30 September 2017. Since returning to the first team for OH Leuven, he found his playing time, coming from the substitute bench. This was due to his knee injury that caused him to go to rehabilitation. In the UEFA Europa League's Play–offs, Gorius scored his second goal for OH Leuven, in a 2–2 draw against Zulte Waregem on 1 April 2018. Two weeks later on 14 April 2018, he scored his third goal for the club, in a 2–0 win against Waasland-Beveren. Gorius captained OH Leuven for the first time, as he helped the club draw 0–0 against Waasland-Beveren on 28 April 2018. Gorius then scored his fourth goal for OH Leuven, in a 2–1 loss against Zulte Waregem on 11 May 2018. At the end of the 2017–18 season, with the club finishing fourth place in the play–offs, he went on to make twenty–one appearances and scoring four times in all competitions.

At the start of the 2018–19 season, Gorius missed the first two league matches of the season, due to a back injury. He made his first appearance of the season, coming on as a late substitute, in a 1–1 draw against Beerschot Wilrijk on 19 August 2018. Since the start of the 2018–19 season, Gorius found his playing time, alternating between the starting line–up and substitute bench in a number of first team matches. He scored his first goal of the season, in a 2–1 loss against Lommel on 4 December 2018. Gorius then set up two goals in two matches between 24 February 2019 and 3 March 2019 against Tubize and Beerschot Wilrijk. However, during a 1–0 loss against Tubize on 29 March 2019, he suffered an injury in the 29th minute and was substituted as a result. Following this, it was announced that Gorius would be out for the rest of the 2018–19 season. At the end of the 2018–19 season, he went on to make twenty–one appearances and scoring once in all competitions. Following this, Gorius was released by OH Leuven when his contract expired at the end of the 2018–19 season.

== Post–playing career ==
After being released by OH Leuven, Gorius said: "If I don't have any news by August, I will advise. You have to think about the future, I would like to stay in the world of football and I already have my UEFA B diploma. Become a consultant I would also like to be part of the management of a club. I know what I could bring." By September, he announced his retirement from professional football. Following this, Gorius was hired to become a consultant for VOOsport, as well as, revealing that he passed his coaching diploma,

In September 2020, Gorius was appointed a sporting director for RWDM47, a club based in Belgian First Division B.

== Personal life ==
Gorius is married to his wife, Binta and together they have a daughter.

== Honours ==
Genk

- Belgian Cup (1): 2012–13
