= Dimitri Daeseleire =

Belgian footballer

Personal information
- Date of birth: 18 May 1990 (age 36)
- Place of birth: Antwerp, Belgium
- Height: 1.69 m (5 ft 7 in)
- Position: Right back

Team information
- Current team: Londerzeel (manager)

Youth career
- Ranst
- –2006: Lierse
- 2006–2008: Genk

Senior career*
| Years | Team | Apps | (Gls) |
| 2008–2011 | Genk | 36 | (0) |
| 2011–2015 | Sint-Truiden | 28 | (0) |
| 2013 | → Antwerp (loan) | 11 | (0) |
| 2015–2017 | Antwerp | 21 | (0) |
| 2017–2019 | OH Leuven | 15 | (0) |
| 2019–2020 | Rupel Boom | 14 | (0) |
| 2020 | Roeselare | 0 | (0) |
| 2021–2024 | Londerzeel | 0 | (0) |

International career^{‡}
| 2005 | Belgium U15 | 4 | (0) |
| 2005–2006 | Belgium U16 | 20 | (0) |
| 2006–2007 | Belgium U17 | 20 | (0) |
| 2007–2008 | Belgium U18 | 9 | (1) |
| 2008–2009 | Belgium U19 | 14 | (0) |
| 2010–2011 | Belgium U21 | 4 | (0) |

Managerial career
- 2024–: Londerzeel
- * Club domestic league appearances and goals ‡ National team caps and goals as of 19 November 2017

Dimitri Daeseleire (born 18 May 1990 in Antwerp) is a retired Belgian football player who played as a right back. He is currently manager of Londerzeel in the Belgian Division 3.

== Career ==
=== Club ===
He began his career at Lierse, moving to the youth squad of Genk in June 2006. In January 2008 he made his debut for the first team of Genk in the Belgian First Division.

=== International ===
He was a member for the Belgium U-17 team at 2007 FIFA U-17 World Cup in South Korea and played 3 games. He was the captain of Belgium's U17 team, and played together with Eden Hazard and Christian Benteke.

== Honours ==
Genk

- Belgian Cup: 2008–09
