= Mamadou Bagayoko (footballer, born 1989) =

Ivorian footballer

- Bagayoko with Petržalka in 2009

Personal information
- Full name: Mamadou Bagayoko
- Date of birth: 31 December 1989 (age 36)
- Place of birth: Abidjan, Ivory Coast
- Height: 1.75 m (5 ft 9 in)
- Position: Right back

Team information
- Current team: Hibernians
- Number: 25

Youth career
- Africa Sports

Senior career*
Years	Team	Apps	(Gls)
2008	Africa Sports	0	(0)
2008–2015	Slovan Bratislava	124	(3)
2009	→ Petržalka (loan)	7	(0)
2015–2017	Sint-Truiden	51	(0)
2017–2018	OH Leuven	13	(0)
2018	→ Mechelen (loan)	6	(0)
2018–2020	Mechelen	15	(0)
2019	→ Red Star (loan)	13	(0)
2021–2022	FC U Craiova	1	(0)
2022–2024	Rebecq	23	(0)
2024–	Hibernians	12	(0)

International career^{‡}
2007	Ivory Coast U21		
2008	Ivory Coast U23	4	(0)
2015–	Ivory Coast	16	(0)
- * Club domestic league appearances and goals as of 13 May 2024 ‡ National team caps and goals as of 10 September 2020

Mamadou Bagayoko (born 31 December 1989) is an Ivorian professional footballer who plays as a defender. He is currently playing for Hibernians in the Maltese Premier League.

== Club career ==
Born in Abidjan, Ivory Coast, Bagayoko began his career at Ivorian club Africa Sports. In the summer of 2008, he moved to Europe signing for ŠK Slovan Bratislava. In January 2009, he was loaned to Artmedia Petržalka, where he played 7 matches in the Slovak First League.

In June 2009, Bagayoko returned to Slovan Bratislava. He played his first match for the club on 2 August 2009, against MFK Košice, coming on as a substitute for Martin Dobrotka late in the second half. On 24 July 2010, he scored his first goal against MŠK Žilina in a 2–2 draw.

In January 2019, he was loaned to Red Star from Mechelen until the end of the season. During the 2019–20 season, back at Mechelen, Bagayoko was not part of the first-team squad and only played for the reserves throughout the whole season. At the end of the season, his contract was terminated despite running until 2021.

== International career ==
Bagayoko represented Ivory Coast at youth international level and was called up to the under-21 national team in 2007. In 2008, he was part of the Ivory Coast under-23 national team that participated in the 2008 Summer Olympics, making four appearances. Ivory Coast advanced from the group stage to the quarter-finals, where they were eliminated after a 2–0 defeat to Nigeria.

He received his first call-up to the Ivory Coast national team in 2015, making his international debut in a 0–0 draw against Sierra Leone. He subsequently made further appearances for the national team in 2016 and 2017.

Bagayoko was selected for Ivory Coast's squad for the 2019 Africa Cup of Nations. He made appearances during the tournament, in which Ivory Coast were eliminated in the quarter-finals by eventual champions Algeria following a penalty shoot-out.

== Career statistics ==
=== International ===
As of matches played on 14 July 2019

Appearances and goals by national team and year
National team	Year	Apps	Goals
Ivory Coast	2015	3	0
Ivory Coast	2016	2	0
Ivory Coast	2017	2	0
Ivory Coast	2018	0	0
Ivory Coast	2019	6	0
Total		13	0
