= Koen Persoons =

Belgian footballer

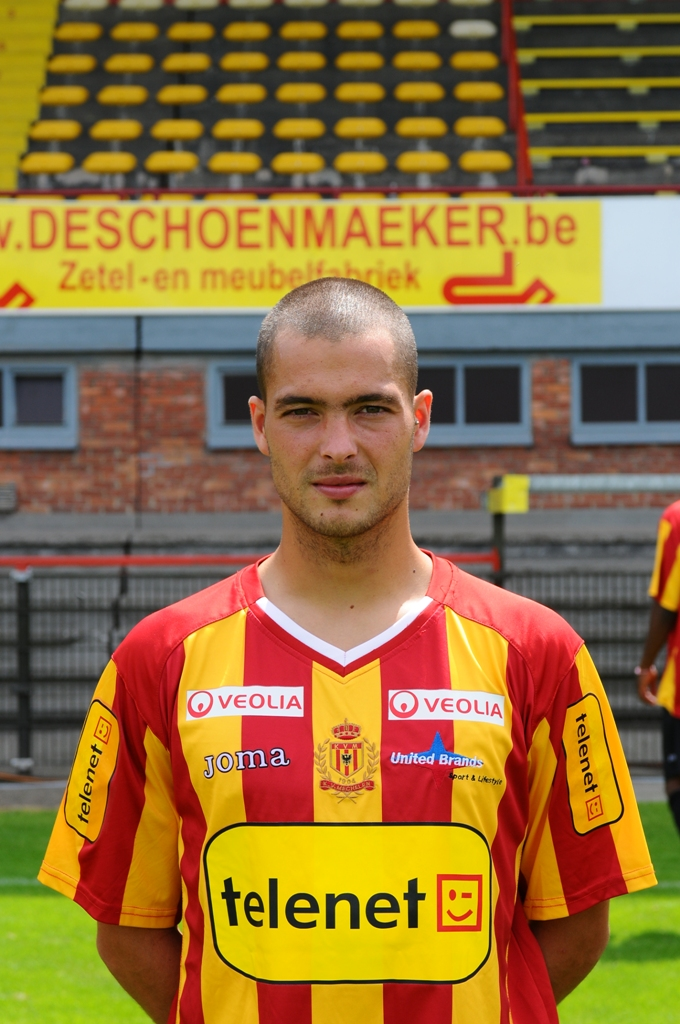

Personal information
- Full name: Koen Persoons
- Date of birth: 12 July 1983 (age 43)
- Place of birth: Aalst, Belgium
- Height: 1.79 m (5 ft 10 1/2 in)
- Position: Midfielder

Team information
- Current team: Ninove

Youth career
- Oudegem
- Eendracht Aalst

Senior career*
Years	Team	Apps	(Gls)
2001–2002	Eendracht Aalst	8	(0)
2002–2005	Denderleeuw	84	(18)
2005–2007	FCV Dender	62	(7)
2007–2010	Mechelen	93	(5)
2010–2017	Lokeren	213	(17)
2017–2019	OH Leuven	19	(1)
2019–2020	Knokke		
2020–2022	Ninove		
- * Club domestic league appearances and goals as of 30 January 2018

Koen Persoons (Dutch pronunciation: [kum pərˈsoːns]; born 12 July 1983) is a Belgian former professional footballer who is the Head of Football for the Club Brugge youth academy outfit Club NXT. He is a defensive midfielder.

== Career ==
Persoons made his first team debut with Eendracht Aalst. When the team went bankrupt, he signed for Aalst rivals FC Denderleeuw, who became FCV Dender after their merge with Verbroedering Denderhoutem. He became popular quite quickly, and was even nicknamed Biglia by his coach Jean-Pierre Vande Velde. Even though Dender became Belgian Second Division champions in 2007, Persoons chose to sign for KV Mechelen who were also playing in Second Division. As KV Mechelen won the playoffs a few weeks later, they promoted toger with Dender to the highest level of Belgian football. Persoons retired from his playing career at the end of the 2021–22 season.

== Post-playing Career ==
On 5 June 2022, Club Brugge announced that Persoons had been appointed Head of Football for the club's youth setup, Club NXT.

== Honours ==
Lokeren

- Belgian Cup: 2011–12, 2013–14
