= Lierse SK (2018) =

Belgian football club

- Full name: Koninklijke Lierse Sportkring
- Nicknames: De Pallieters; Geel-Zwart (Yellow-Black)
- Founded: 1943; 83 years ago (as FC Oosterzonen)
- Ground: Herman Vanderpoortenstadion, Lier
- Capacity: 13,539
- Chairman: Luc Van Thillo
- Manager: Arno Van den Abbeel
- League: Challenger Pro League
- 2025–26: Challenger Pro League, 10th of 17
- Website: https://www.lierse.com/
Home colours	Away colours

Koninklijke Lierse Sportkring is a Belgian association football club located in Lier, in the province of Antwerp. The club, founded in 1943 as Oosterzonen in Oosterwijk, was relocated to Lier following the bankruptcy of Lierse in 2018. After an official name change, Lierse Kempenzonen was renamed to K. Lierse S.K. in 2024. They compete in the Challenger Pro League, the second tier of Belgian football.

== History ==
The club was founded in 1943 as FC Oosterzonen from a commune within Westerlo. It started in the Belgian provincial leagues where it hovered between the various levels, most of the time playing at the 6th or 7th level of the Belgian football pyramid. In 2007, 2008 and 2009, the club won the title for three consecutive seasons and were promoted for the first time in its history to the national levels of football. In the Belgian Fourth Division, the club avoided relegation for a few seasons, before managing another promotion in the 2012–13 season into the Belgian Third Division. Following the reform of Belgian football in 2016, the team started playing in the Belgian First Amateur Division.

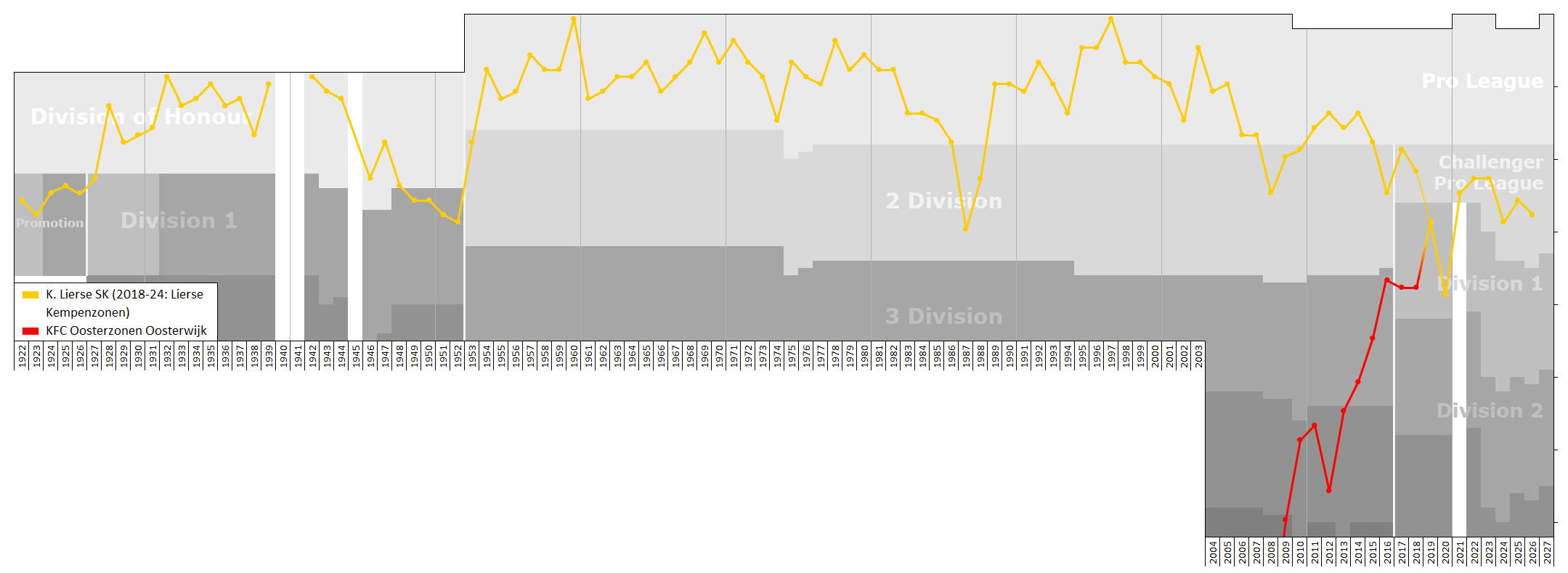
Historical chart of Lierse SK league performance

In May 2018, it was announced that the club would relocate to Lier, as it merged with the old board of Lierse (a club which had gone bankrupt just a few weeks before) to form a new club called Lierse Kempenzonen. The new team continued with the old logo of Lierse and started playing in the Herman Vanderpoortenstadion in Lier.

== Current squad ==
As of 3 September 2026

Note: Flags indicate national team as defined under FIFA eligibility rules; some limited exceptions apply. Players may hold more than one non-FIFA nationality.

No.	Pos.	Nation	Player
1	GK	BEL	Jarno De Smet
2	DF	BEL	Pietro Perdichizzi
3	DF	BEL	Thiebe Van Elsuwege
4	DF	BEL	Sam Vanderhallen
5	MF	NED	Bryan Smeets
6	MF	BEL	Noam Mayoka-Tika
7	FW	COD	Yohan Mboko
8	MF	BEL	Christian Kouam
9	FW	GEQ	Cristian Makaté
10	FW	BEL	Alexandre Stanic
11	FW	BEL	Samih El Touile
14	DF	BEL	Wout De Buyser
16	GK	BEL	Louis Daems
19	FW	BEL	Kyan Himpe (on loan from Kortrijk)
20	DF	BEL	Dylan Dassy

No.	Pos.	Nation	Player
21	MF	GHA	Elton Yeboah
24	DF	BEL	Jano Willems
27	MF	BEL	Daan De Peuter
30	DF	BEL	Pieter De Schrijver
32	GK	BEL	Willem Van Clemen
36	MF	MAR	Saïf-Eddine Boutkabout
44	MF	MAR	Yassin Aouriaghel
58	DF	BEL	Vincent De Vos
66	DF	BEL	Jenthe Mertens
70	MF	BEL	Rayan El Touile
73	MF	NED	Jayden Braaf
79	MF	BEL	Pierre Dwomoh
80	MF	BEL	Marko Mitrovic
99	FW	SLO	Lun Bončina

=== Out on loan ===
Note: Flags indicate national team as defined under FIFA eligibility rules; some limited exceptions apply. Players may hold more than one non-FIFA nationality.

No.	Pos.	Nation	Player
—	GK	CAN	Kieran Baskett (at Brattvåg until 30 June 2027)

== Coaching staff ==
Position	Name
Manager	(United States) Jamath Shoffner
Assistant managers	(Belgium) Nico Van Kerckhoven
Goalkeeper coach	(Qatar) (Belgium) Patrick Decsi
Video analyst	(Belgium) Bernd Brughmans
Team Doctor	(Italy) (Belgium) Roel Rymen
Physiotherapist	(Belgium) Lars De Buyst (Belgium) Tom Waegemans
Materialman	(Belgium) Hans Van Rooy (Belgium) Rony Nauwelaers
