= 2016–17 Oud-Heverlee Leuven season =

Oud-Heverlee Leuven
2016–17 season
- Chairman: (Belgium) Jimmy Houtput (until 30 September) (Belgium) Chris Vandebroeck (caretaker)
- Manager: (Belgium) Emilio Ferrera (until 15 January) (Netherlands) Dennis van Wijk (from 19 January)
- Stadium: Den Dreef
- Belgian First Division B: 6th
- Belgian Cup: Round 6
- Top goalscorer: League: Esteban Casagolda, 8 goals All: Esteban Casagolda, 8 goals
Home colours	Away colours

The 2016–17 season was Oud-Heverlee Leuven's 15th competitive season in professional football and the team's first season at the second level following their second relegation from the Belgian Pro League. Following a poor start the team only won their first match near the end of September on matchday seven. The form continued and OH Leuven kept struggling all season to set a consistent string of decent performances despite pre-season hopes of immediately regaining promotion to the Belgian First Division A. The team ended 5th in the opening competition and when despite a good start in the closing competition the performance started dropping, threatening to cause the team to end in the bottom four, manager Emilio Ferrera was sacked and replaced with Dennis van Wijk. Van Wijk could not improve the results and his main task involved in avoiding relegation, in which the team succeeded only on the very last day of the competition in a won home match against direct competitors Lommel United.

On top of the lacklustre season regarding performances, the club also experienced a turbulent season regarding ownership and management: in September 2016, chairman Jimmy Houtput was alleged to have offered the club as a "conduit" to allow third-party companies to gain ownership of football players in England. Houtput claimed he was "merely trying to obtain the identity of the possible investor(s) and would never take part in illegal activities to circumvent the third-party ownership", but subsequently resigned as OH Leuven chairman on 30 September. Chris Vandebroeck stepped in as care-taking chairman but has not been replaced since. In February 2017, Vandebroeck announced that the team had formed a pre-agreement with a Chinese investment company to perform a takeover of OH Leuven, stating that following the relegation a financial injection was needed to remain competitive. In reaction to a wave of criticism from supporters that the club would be sold to foreign investors, a group of supporters created a project called "OHL op Dreef" which managed to find a group of Flemish investors and entrepreneurs from the Leuven region willing to invest in the club. The group finally made a counter-offer and in the months that followed it became clear that the Chinese investment group was not following up on their commitments and would be backing out the investment. This seemed to give the Flemish investors the leading edge, but surprisingly, OH Leuven announced early May they had again signed a new pre-agreement, but now with a set of Thai investors, more specifically the King Power International Group led by Vichai Srivaddhanaprabha who already owns Leicester City. Vichai's son Aiyawatt Srivaddhanaprabha would become CEO of OH Leuven.

== 2016–17 squad ==
- This section lists players who were in Oud-Heveree Leuven's first team squad at any point during the 2016–17 season
- The symbol § indicates player left mid-season
- The symbol # indicates player joined mid-season
- The symbol ¥ indicates a youngster who has appeared on the match sheet at least once during the season (possibly as unused substitute)
- Italics indicate loan player

No.	Nationality	Name	Position	Joined First Team	Signed from
Goalkeepers
1	(Belgium)	Nick Gillekens	GK	2015	Youth
21	(Belgium)	Andreas Suederick^{¥}	GK	NA, Youth Squad	(Belgium) Genk
26	(Belgium)	Laurent Henkinet^{#}	GK	2017	Free Agent
28	(Israel)	Ram Strauss^{§}	GK	2016	(Romania) Poli Timișoara
Defenders
2	(Belgium)	Soufiane El Banouhi	CB	2016	(Belgium) WS Bruxelles
3	(Belgium) / (Turkey)	Fazlı Kocabaş	CB	2016	(Belgium) Union SG
4	(France)	Romain Reynaud	CB	2014	(Belgium) Kortrijk
5	(Belgium)	Pierre-Yves Ngawa	RB	2015	(Belgium) Lierse
12	(Belgium)	Jeroen Simaeys	CB	2016	(Russia) Krylia Sovetov
15	(Belgium)	Pieter-Jan Monteyne	LB	2015	(Belgium) Mouscron-Péruwelz
17	(Belgium)	Nathan Durieux^{¥}	CB	NA, Youth Squad	Youth
19	(Belgium)	Cédric D'Ulivo	CB	2016	(Belgium) Zulte Waregem
24	(Belgium)	Nathan de Medina	CB	Loan	(Belgium) Anderlecht
25	(Belgium)	Nicolas Delporte	LB	2014	(Belgium) Gent
28	(Belgium)	Siebe Horemans	CB	Loan	(Belgium) Gent
Midfielders
6	(Belgium)	Kenneth Houdret	CM	2015	(Belgium) Charleroi
7	(Belgium)	Jonathan Kindermans	CM	2016	(Netherlands) RKC Waalwijk
8	(Ivory Coast) / (France)	Flavien Le Postollec	CM	2014	(Belgium) Mons
16	(Belgium)	Jordy Lokando	CM	2015	Youth
18	(Belgium)	Robin Peeters^{¥}	CM	NA, Youth Squad	Youth
22	(Belgium)	Simon Bracke	CM	2015	Youth
24	(Belgium)	Lucas Schoofs	CM	Loan	(Belgium) Gent
27	(Belgium)	Mehdi Bounou^{¥}	CM	NA, Youth Squad	Youth
31	(Belgium)	Nikola Storm^{#}	LW / RW	Loan	(Belgium) Club Brugge
Forwards
9	(Belgium) / (Spain) / (Uruguay)	Esteban Casagolda	CF	2016	(Belgium) Dender EH
10	(Cameroon)	Serge Tabekou	LW / RW	Loan	(Belgium) Gent
11	(Belgium) / (Armenia)	Ben Yagan	CF	2016	(Belgium) Heist
14	(Belgium)	Thomas Azevedo	LW / RW	2011	(Belgium) Lommel United
18	(Belgium)	Tuur Houben^{§}	CF	2016	Youth
20	(Belgium)	Din Sula	CF	2015	Youth
23	(North Macedonia)	Jovan Kostovski	CF	2013	(North Macedonia) Vardar
29	(Belgium)	Leo Njengo^{#}	CF	2017	(Belgium) Dessel Sport
30	(Republic of the Congo) / (Belgium)	Yannick Loemba	CF / LW / RW	Loan	(Belgium) Oostende

== Transfers ==
The first transfer was announced already in March 2016, when it was released that second goalkeeper Yves Lenaerts had signed for ASV Geel in search for more playing opportunity. This proved to be just the first outgoing transfer of many, as following the relegation from the Belgian Pro League on 13 March 2016, several players left the team: Brazilian defender Kanu saw his contract terminated by mutual consent just a few days after the relegation, over the summer three key players were sold, namely John Bostock (to Lens), Yohan Croizet (to Mechelen) and Jordan Remacle (to Antwerp). The loan deals of Samuel Asamoah, Charni Ekangamene, Leandro Trossard, Slobodan Urošević and Oleksandr Volovyk were not extended, youngster Konstantinos Rougalas was allowed to leave the club and return to Greece and the contracts of Frenchmen Jean Calvé and Rudy Riou, striker Kim Ojo and defender Kenny Van Hoevelen were either terminated or not prolonged. Yohan Brouckaert and Kenneth Van Goethem were out on loan during the 2015–16 season and both signed for new teams, Brouckaert moved to RWDM47 while Kenneth Van Goethem moved to Aarschot. Other outgoing transfers included substitute strikers Alessandro Cerigioni and Romero Regales, respectively moving to Waasland-Beveren and Den Bosch.

At this point, the only remaining players were goalkeeper Gillekens, defenders Delporte, Ngawa and Reynaud, midfielders Le Postollec and Lokando and strikers Azevedo, Kostovski and Sula, not even enough for a complete lineup. The first additions arrived early June, as OH Leuven announced the contract extensions of Kenneth Houdret and Pieterjan Monteyne, while youngster Simon Bracke returned from loan to ASV Geel and was added to the squad. Later that month, the first new names were signed with defender Fazlı Kocabaş (from Union SG) and striker Esteban Casagolda (from Dender EH). OH Leuven then again announced some familiar names, first with the return of winger Ben Yagan who had been released in the summer of 2015 but had experienced a strong season at Heist, followed by the surprise signing of experienced defender and OH Leuven youth product Jeroen Simaeys from Krylia Sovetov. Later in the month of July, the team confirmed the loan deal of winger Serge Tabekou, arriving from Gent.

Early August saw three newcomers added to the team, the signings of Soufiane El Banouhi (from WS Brussels) and Jonathan Kindermans (from Waalwijk) were not unexpected as both had been training with the team for several weeks already. Finally experienced defender Cédric D'Ulivo was also added to the team, coming over from Zulte Waregem. Towards the end of the summer 2016 transfer window, goalkeeper Ram Strauss was brought in from Poli Timișoara as a substitute for Gillekens and on transfer deadline day itself OHL loaned two players to complete the squad, with Yannick Loemba and Nathan de Medina coming over respectively from Oostende and Anderlecht.

During the 2016–17 winter transfer window, OHL first released two players near the end of 2016 by terminating by mutual consent the contracts of youngster Tuur Houben and only recently acquired goalkeeper Ram Strauss. To replace Strauss as second keeper, free agent player Laurent Henkinet was signed, after which followed the signings of youngsters Leo Njengo (from Dessel Sport) and Nikola Storm (on loan from Club Brugge). Finally on 31 January 2016, the last day of the winter transfer window, OHL loaned two players from Gent: midfielder Lucas Schoofs and defender Siebe Horemans.

=== Transfers In ===
Date from	Position	Nationality	Name	From	Fee	Ref.
End of 2015–16 season	MF	(Belgium)	Simon Bracke	(Belgium) ASV Geel	Loan Return	
10 June 2016	MF	(Belgium)	Kenneth Houdret	(Belgium) Charleroi	Undisclosed (Note: Houdret was on loan from Charleroi during the 2015–16 season. The loan ended but Houdret moved to OHL permanently.)	
20 June 2016	DF	(Belgium)	Fazlı Kocabaş	(Belgium) Union SG	Undisclosed	
24 June 2016	FW	(Belgium)	Esteban Casagolda	(Belgium) Dender EH	Undisclosed	
30 June 2016	FW	(Belgium)	Ben Yagan	(Belgium) Heist	Undisclosed	
3 July 2016	DF	(Belgium)	Jeroen Simaeys	(Russia) Krylia Sovetov	Undisclosed	
20 July 2016	MF	(Cameroon)	Serge Tabekou	(Belgium) Gent	Loan	
2 August 2016	DF	(Belgium)	Soufiane El Banouhi	(Belgium) WS Brussels	Undisclosed	
2 August 2016	MF	(Belgium)	Jonathan Kindermans	(Netherlands) Waalwijk	Undisclosed	
3 August 2016	DF	(Belgium)	Cédric D'Ulivo	(Belgium) Zulte Waregem	Undisclosed	
20 August 2016	GK	(Israel)	Ram Strauss	(Romania) Poli Timișoara	Free	
31 August 2016	MF	(Belgium)	Nathan de Medina	(Belgium) Anderlecht	Loan	
31 August 2016	MF	(Belgium)	Yannick Loemba	(Belgium) Oostende	Loan	
27 December 2016	GK	(Belgium)	Laurent Henkinet	Free Agent	NA	
6 January 2017	FW	(Belgium)	Leo Njengo	(Belgium) Dessel Sport	Undisclosed	
9 January 2017	MF	(Belgium)	Nikola Storm	(Belgium) Club Brugge	Loan	
31 January 2017	DF	(Belgium)	Siebe Horemans	(Belgium) Gent	Loan	
31 January 2017	MF	(Belgium)	Lucas Schoofs	(Belgium) Gent	Loan	

=== Transfers Out ===
Date to	Position	Nationality	Name	To	Fee	Ref.
2 March 2016	GK	(Belgium)	Yves Lenaerts	(Belgium) ASV Geel	Undisclosed	
21 March 2016	MF	(Belgium)	Kenneth Van Goethem	(Belgium) Aarschot	Released (Note: Van Goethem was on loan to Heist during the 2015–16 season. The loan ended and he was released to Aarschot.)	
23 March 2016	DF	(Brazil)	Kanu	Free Agent	Contract terminated by mutual consent	
26 April 2016	FW	(Belgium)	Alessandro Cerigioni	(Belgium) Waasland-Beveren	Undisclosed	
21 May 2016	AM	(France)	Yohan Croizet	(Belgium) Mechelen	Undisclosed	
23 June 2016	MF	(Belgium)	Yohan Brouckaert	(Belgium) RWDM47	Released (Note: Brouckaert was on loan to Roeselare during the 2015–16 season. The loan ended and he was released to RWDM47.)	
30 June 2016	RW	(Belgium)	Jordan Remacle	(Belgium) Antwerp	Undisclosed	
30 June 2016	DF	(Greece)	Konstantinos Rougalas	Free Agent	Released	
End of 2015–16 season	MF	(Ghana)	Samuel Asamoah	(Belgium) Eupen	Loan Return	
End of 2015–16 season	DF	(France)	Jean Calvé	Free Agent	Released	
End of 2015–16 season	MF	(Belgium)	Charni Ekangamene	(Belgium) Zulte Waregem	Loan Return	
End of 2015–16 season	FW	(Nigeria)	Kim Ojo	Free Agent	Released	
End of 2015–16 season	GK	(France)	Rudy Riou	Free Agent	Released	
End of 2015–16 season	MF	(Belgium)	Leandro Trossard	(Belgium) Genk	Loan Return	
End of 2015–16 season	MF	(Serbia)	Slobodan Urošević	(Serbia) Napredak Kruševac	Loan Return	
End of 2015–16 season	DF	(Belgium)	Kenny Van Hoevelen	Free Agent	End of contract	
End of 2015–16 season	DF	(Ukraine)	Oleksandr Volovyk	(Ukraine) Shakhtar Donetsk	Loan Return	
5 July 2016	CM	(Trinidad and Tobago) / (England)	John Bostock	(France) Lens	Undisclosed	
12 July 2016	CF	(Curaçao)	Romero Regales	(Netherlands) Den Bosch	Undisclosed	
19 December 2016	CF	(Belgium)	Tuur Houben	Free Agent	Released	
23 December 2016	GK	(Israel)	Ram Strauss	Free Agent	Released	

== Pre-season ==
Match	Date	Opponent	Venue	Result	Scorers	Report
1	6 July 2016	(Belgium) Anderlecht	H	1–4	Casagolda pen.	Report
2	9 July 2016	(Belgium) Linden	A	7–0	Houdret, Kostovski (2), Yagan (2), Lokando, Sula	Report
3	13 July 2016	(Belgium) Lokeren	A	0–4		Report
4	16 July 2016	(Belgium) Sint-Truiden	A	4–1	Yagan, Houben, Bracke, Kostovski	Report
5	20 July 2016	(Belgium) KV Mechelen	H	1–1	Bracke	Report
6	23 July 2016	(Belgium) Westerlo	A	2–2	Sula, Tabekou	Report
7	24 July 2016	(Belgium) Olympia Wijgmaal	A	1–2	Camara	Report
8	27 July 2016	(Luxembourg) UNA Strassen	A	2–1	Kostovski, Sula	Report
9	30 July 2016	(Belgium) Eendracht Aalst	H	4–0	Kostovski, Casagolda, Kindermans, Sula	Report

== Belgian First Division B ==
OHL's first season in the Belgian First Division B began on 7 August 2016.

=== Results ===
==== Opening Competition ====
Match	Date	Opponent	Venue	Result	Attendance	Scorers	Report	Opening Competition Position
1	7 August 2016	Lommel United	A	2–2		Kostovski 42', Azevedo 73'	Report	1st
2	12 August 2016	Union SG	H	0–3			Report	7th
3	20 August 2016	Roeselare	A	2–2		Sula 46', Kindermans 80'	Report	7th
4	2 September 2016	Lierse	A	2–2		Kostovski 11', Casagolda 69'	Report	7th
5	11 September 2016	Tubize	H	0–1			Report	8th
6	18 September 2016	Antwerp	H	1–1		Casagolda 69'	Report	8th
7	25 September 2016	Cercle Brugge	A	4–2		Loemba 4', Kocabaş 44', Casagolda 57', Tabekou 85'	Report	7th
8	2 October 2016	Lommel United	H	2–2		Simaeys 79', Kostovski 84'	Report	8th
9	5 October 2016	Tubize	A	1–0		Kostovski 14'	Report	5th
10	9 October 2016	Roeselare	H	1–1		Loemba 24'	Report	6th
11	16 October 2016	Antwerp	A	1–2		Simaeys 36'	Report	7th
12	22 October 2016	Cercle Brugge	H	2–0		Tabekou 24', Azevedo 45+2'	Report	4th
13	29 October 2016	Union SG	A	0–2			Report	5th
14	6 November 2016	Lierse	H	0–1			Report	5th

==== Closing Competition ====
Match	Date	Opponent	Venue	Result	Attendance	Scorers	Report	Closing Competition Position	Overall League Position
1	12 November 2016	Lommel United	A	2–2		Kindermans 32', Houdret 33'	Report	2nd	6th
2	18 November 2016	Antwerp	H	0–0			Report	3rd	6th
3	27 November 2016	Cercle Brugge	H	1–0		Casagolda 75' (p)	Report	3rd	5th
4	3 December 2016	Tubize	A	2–0		Azevedo 54', Casagolda 71'	Report	1st	4th
5	10 December 2016	Roeselare	H	1–2		Kostovski 75'	Report	3rd	5th
6	18 December 2016	Lierse	A	1–1		Kostovski 44'	Report	4th	5th
7	8 January 2017	Union SG	A	0–4			Report	5th	5th
8	14 January 2017	Tubize	H	1–3		Tabekou 23'	Report	6th	6th
9	21 January 2017	Antwerp	A	0–2			Report	7th	6th
10	27 January 2017	Lierse	H	2–3		Loemba 75', Casagolda 90+3' (p)	Report	7th	7th
11	5 February 2017	Roeselare	A	1–2		Kostovski 37'	Report	7th	7th
12	11 February 2017	Lommel United	H	2–1		Storm 18', Lenaerts 30' (o.g.)	Report	7th	7th
13	18 February 2017	Cercle Brugge	A	0–1			Report	7th	7th
14	26 February 2017	Union SG	H	2–0		Horemans 18', Casagolda 44'	Report	7th	7th

==== Relegation play-offs ====
Match	Date	Opponent	Venue	Result	Attendance	Scorers	Report	Position
1	24 March 2017	Tubize	H	1–1		Tabekou 79'	Report	3rd
2	1 April 2017	Lommel United	A	1–2		Corstjens 5' (o.g.)	Report	3rd
3	7 April 2017	Cercle Brugge	H	1–0		Casagolda 40'	Report	2nd
4	14 April 2017	Cercle Brugge	A	0–0			Report	1st
5	22 April 2017	Tubize	A	1–0			Report	3rd
6	28 April 2017	Lommel United	H	1–0		Cauwenberg 53' (o.g.)	Report	2nd

== Belgian Cup ==
=== Results ===
Match	Date	Opponent	Venue	Result	Scorers	Penalty shoot-out	Report
R5	28 August 2016	Rebecq	A (Note: The match was not played on the home pitch of Rebecqoise in Rebecq but rather at the Stade Leburton which was only a few kilometres away in Tubize and allowed for a much larger number of spectators to attend.)	1–1 (3–5 p)	Azevedo 14'	(penalty scored) Casagolda; (penalty scored) Bracke; (penalty scored) Le Postollec; (penalty scored) D'Ulivo; (penalty scored) Kocabaş	Report
R6	21 September 2016	Anderlecht	A	0–1			Report
