= List of Belgian football transfers winter 2016–17 =

This is a list of Belgian football transfers for the 2016-17 winter transfer window. Only transfers involving a team from the professional divisions are listed, including the 16 teams in the 2016–17 Belgian First Division A and the 8 teams playing in the 2016–17 Belgian First Division B.

The winter transfer window opens on 1 January 2017, although a few transfers may take place prior to that date. The window closes at midnight on 1 February 2017 although outgoing transfers might still happen to leagues in which the window is still open. Players without a club may join teams, either during or in between transfer windows.

== Sorted by date ==
=== December ===
| Date | Name | Moving from | Moving to | Fee | Note |
|---|---|---|---|---|---|
| December 15, 2016 | (Chile) Nicolás Castillo | (Belgium) Club Brugge | (Mexico) UNAM | Undisclosed | (Note: Castillo was on loan from Club Brugge to Universidad Católica. The loan ended and Castillo was sold to UNAM.) |
| December 19, 2016 | (Belgium) Tuur Houben | (Belgium) OH Leuven | (Netherlands) MVV Maastricht | Released | |
| December 22, 2016 | (Serbia) Filip Mladenović | (Germany) 1. FC Köln | (Belgium) Standard Liège | Undisclosed | |
| December 23, 2016 | (Norway) Sander Berge | (Norway) Vålerenga | (Belgium) Genk | Undisclosed | |
| December 23, 2016 | (Israel) Ram Strauss | (Belgium) OH Leuven | Free Agent | Released | |
| December 26, 2016 | (Belgium) Faris Haroun | (Belgium) Cercle Brugge | (Belgium) Antwerp | Undisclosed | |
| December 27, 2016 | (Belgium) Laurent Henkinet | Free Agent | (Belgium) OH Leuven | NA | |
| December 28, 2016 | (Belgium) Jason Adesanya | (Belgium) Lommel United | (Belgium) Rupel Boom | Free | |
| December 28, 2016 | (Croatia) Lovre Kalinić | (Croatia) Hajduk Split | (Belgium) Gent | Undisclosed | |
| December 28, 2016 | (Greece) Thanasis Papazoglou | (Belgium) Kortrijk | (Netherlands) Roda JC | Loan | |
| December 29, 2016 | (Belgium) Sebastiaan Brebels | (Belgium) Zulte Waregem | (Belgium) Cercle Brugge | Loan | |
| December 29, 2016 | (France) William Dutoit | (Belgium) Sint-Truiden | (Belgium) Oostende | Free | |
| December 29, 2016 | (Greece) Michalis Manias | (Belgium) Westerlo | (Greece) Asteras Tripolis | Free | |
| December 30, 2016 | (Brazil) Felipe Gedoz | (Belgium) Club Brugge | (Brazil) Atlético Paranaense | Undisclosed | |

=== End of 2016 ===
Some players were on a loan which ended in 2016. As of 1 January 2017, they returned to their original club and are listed here. For a list of players on loan during the last year, see List of Belgian football transfers winter 2015–16 and summer 2016.

| Date | Name | Moving from | Moving to | Fee |
|---|---|---|---|---|
| End of 2016 | (Nigeria) William Troost-Ekong | (Norway) Haugesund | (Belgium) Gent | Loan Return |

=== January ===
| Date | Name | Moving from | Moving to | Fee | Note |
|---|---|---|---|---|---|
| January 1, 2017 | (Belgium) Wouter Corstjens | (Greece) Panetolikos | (Belgium) Lommel United | Undisclosed | |
| January 2, 2017 | (France) Mehdi Beneddine | (France) Monaco | (Belgium) Cercle Brugge | Loan | |
| January 2, 2017 | (Guinea) Tafsir Chérif | (France) Monaco | (Belgium) Cercle Brugge | Loan | |
| January 2, 2017 | (France) Paul Nardi | (France) Monaco | (Belgium) Cercle Brugge | Loan | |
| January 3, 2017 | (France) Jonathan Bamba | (Belgium) Sint-Truiden | (France) Saint-Étienne | Loan Return | |
| January 3, 2017 | (United States) Ethan Horvath | (Norway) Molde | (Belgium) Club Brugge | Undisclosed | |
| January 3, 2017 | (Nigeria) Wilfred Ndidi | (Belgium) Genk | (England) Leicester City | Undisclosed | |
| January 3, 2017 | (Belgium) Nicolas Orye | (Belgium) Waasland-Beveren | (Belgium) Lommel United | Loan | |
| January 4, 2017 | (Nigeria) Samuel Kalu | (Slovakia) Trenčín | (Belgium) Gent | Undisclosed | |
| January 4, 2017 | (France) Kévin Lefaix | (Belgium) Tubize | (France) Chambly | Free | |
| January 4, 2017 | (Belgium) Tom Raes | (Belgium) Roeselare | (Belgium) Hamme | Loan | |
| January 4, 2017 | (Brazil) Vagner | (Belgium) Excel Mouscron | (Portugal) Boavista | Loan | |
| January 5, 2017 | (France) Farès Bahlouli | (Belgium) Standard Liège | (France) Monaco | Loan Return | |
| January 5, 2017 | (Belgium) Boli Bolingoli-Mbombo | (Belgium) Club Brugge | (Belgium) Sint-Truiden | Loan | |
| January 5, 2017 | (Belgium) Sébastien Bruzzese | (Belgium) Club Brugge | (Belgium) Sint-Truiden | Loan | |
| January 5, 2017 | (Senegal) Babacar Guèye | (Germany) Hannover 96 | (Belgium) Zulte Waregem | Loan | |
| January 5, 2017 | (Belgium) Brandon Mechele | (Belgium) Club Brugge | (Belgium) Sint-Truiden | Loan | |
| January 5, 2017 | (Sweden) Carlos Strandberg | (Russia) CSKA Moscow | (Belgium) Club Brugge | Undisclosed | |
| January 5, 2017 | (Sweden) Isaac Kiese Thelin | (France) Bordeaux | (Belgium) Anderlecht | Loan | |
| January 6, 2017 | (France) Teddy Chevalier | (France) Lens | (Belgium) Kortrijk | Undisclosed | |
| January 6, 2017 | (Tunisia) Hamdi Harbaoui | (Belgium) Anderlecht | (Belgium) Charleroi | Loan | |
| January 6, 2017 | (Italy) Eric Lanini | (Belgium) Westerlo | (Italy) Juventus | Loan Return | |
| January 6, 2017 | (Senegal) Cherif Ndiaye | (Senegal) Grand Yoff | (Belgium) Waasland-Beveren | Undisclosed | |
| January 6, 2017 | (Greece) Sotiris Ninis | (Belgium) Charleroi | (Belgium) Mechelen | Free | |
| January 6, 2017 | (Belgium) Leo Njengo | (Belgium) Dessel Sport | (Belgium) OH Leuven | Undisclosed | |
| January 6, 2017 | (Belgium) Jordan Remacle | (Belgium) Antwerp | (Belgium) Charleroi | Free | |
| January 6, 2017 | (Georgia (country)) Levan Shengelia | (Belgium) Tubize | (South Korea) Daejeon Citizen | Loan | |
| January 6, 2017 | (Angola) Igor Vetokele | (England) Charlton Athletic | (Belgium) Sint-Truiden | Loan | (Note: Vetokele was on loan from Charlton Athletic to Zulte Waregem for the 2016-17 season, but the parties agreed to transfer the loan deal to Sint-Truiden, who will take over the remainder of the loan.) |
| January 7, 2017 | (Netherlands) Lex Immers | (England) Cardiff City | (Belgium) Club Brugge | Free | |
| January 7, 2017 | (Lithuania) Deivydas Matulevičius | (Romania) Botoșani | (Belgium) Excel Mouscron | Undisclosed | |
| January 7, 2017 | (Colombia) Helibelton Palacios | (Colombia) Deportivo Cali | (Belgium) Club Brugge | Undisclosed | |
| January 7, 2017 | (France) Yoan Severin | (Italy) Juventus | (Belgium) Zulte Waregem | Undisclosed | |
| January 8, 2017 | (Ivory Coast) Silas Gnaka | (Senegal) Aspire Academy | (Belgium) Eupen | Undisclosed | |
| January 9, 2017 | (Serbia) Darko Bjedov | (Serbia) Javor Ivanjica | (Belgium) Gent | Undisclosed | |
| January 9, 2017 | (Belgium) Nathan Kabasele | (Belgium) Anderlecht | (Belgium) Excel Mouscron | Loan | |
| January 9, 2017 | (Belgium) Nikola Storm | (Belgium) Club Brugge | (Belgium) OH Leuven | Loan | |
| January 9, 2017 | (Serbia) Dalibor Veselinović | (Belgium) Mechelen | (South Korea) Incheon United | Free | |
| January 10, 2017 | (Guadeloupe) Mickaël Antoine-Curier | (Belgium) Union SG | (Belgium) Eendracht Aalst | Loan | |
| January 10, 2017 | (Belgium) Dylan Lambrecth | (Belgium) RFC Liège | (Belgium) Anderlecht | Undisclosed | |
| January 10, 2017 | (Belgium) Dylan Lambrecth | (Belgium) Anderlecht | (Belgium) Roeselare | Loan | |
| January 10, 2017 | (Spain) José Naranjo | (Spain) Celta de Vigo | (Belgium) Genk | Undisclosed | |
| January 11, 2017 | (Belgium) Dino Arslanagić | (Belgium) Standard Liège | (Belgium) Excel Mouscron | Undisclosed | |
| January 11, 2017 | (Belgium) Jarno Molenberghs | (Belgium) Westerlo | (Belgium) Lommel United | Loan | |
| January 11, 2017 | (Belgium) Jordy Verstraeten | (Belgium) Antwerp | (Belgium) Eendracht Aalst | Free | |
| January 12, 2017 | (Nigeria) Elderson Echiéjilé | (Belgium) Standard Liège | (France) Monaco | Loan Return | |
| January 12, 2017 | (Martinique) Mickael Malsa | (Belgium) Antwerp | Free Agent | Released | |
| January 13, 2017 | (Belgium) Bryan Verboom | (Belgium) Zulte Waregem | (Netherlands) Roda JC | Loan | |
| January 15, 2017 | (Japan) Yuji Ono | (Belgium) Sint-Truiden | (Japan) Sagan Tosu | Free | |
| January 15, 2017 | (France) Adrien Trebel | (Belgium) Standard Liège | (Belgium) Anderlecht | Undisclosed | |
| January 16, 2017 | (England) Gary Martin | (Iceland) Víkingur | (Belgium) Lokeren | Undisclosed | |
| January 16, 2017 | (Mali) Birama Touré | (Belgium) Standard Liège | (France) Auxerre | Loan | |
| January 17, 2017 | (Egypt) Amr Barakat | (Belgium) Lierse | (Egypt) Al Ahly | Undisclosed | |
| January 17, 2017 | (Belgium) Michiel Jaeken | (Belgium) Antwerp | (Belgium) Deinze | Loan | |
| January 17, 2017 | (Belgium) Yannis Mbombo | (Belgium) Standard Liège | (Sweden) Örebro | Undisclosed | |
| January 17, 2017 | (Belgium) Siebe Schrijvers | (Belgium) Waasland-Beveren | (Belgium) Genk | Loan Return | |
| January 17, 2017 | (Sweden) Carlos Strandberg | (Belgium) Club Brugge | (Belgium) Westerlo | Loan | |
| January 17, 2017 | (Belgium) Hannes Van der Bruggen | (Belgium) Gent | (Belgium) Kortrijk | Undisclosed | |
| January 17, 2017 | (Belgium) Birger Verstraete | (Belgium) Kortrijk | (Belgium) Gent | Undisclosed | |
| January 18, 2017 | (France) Romain Métanire | (Belgium) Kortrijk | (France) Reims | Undisclosed | |
| January 18, 2017 | (Sweden) Tesfaldet Tekie | (Sweden) Norrköping | (Belgium) Gent | Undisclosed | |
| January 19, 2017 | (Netherlands) Issam Al Kamouchi | (Belgium) Lommel United | Free Agent | Released | (Note: Al Kamouchi was on loan from Lommel United to Hades. The loan ended and the contract of Al Kamouchi was terminated.) |
| January 19, 2017 | (Mali) Boubacar Diarra | (Egypt) Wadi Degla | (Belgium) Lierse | Undisclosed | |
| January 19, 2017 | (Iceland) Sverrir Ingi Ingason | (Belgium) Lokeren | (Spain) Granada | Undisclosed | |
| January 19, 2017 | (Belgium) Senne Vits | (Belgium) Standard Liège | (Netherlands) MVV Maastricht | Loan | |
| January 20, 2017 | (Romania) Răzvan Marin | (Romania) Viitorul Constanța | (Belgium) Standard Liège | Undisclosed | |
| January 20, 2017 | (Denmark) Lasse Nielsen | (Belgium) Gent | (Sweden) Malmö | Undisclosed | |
| January 20, 2017 | (Egypt) Zizo | (Belgium) Lierse | (Portugal) Nacional | Loan | |
| January 21, 2017 | (Belgium) Ilombe Mboyo | (Switzerland) Sion | (Belgium) Cercle Brugge | Loan | |
| January 21, 2017 | (Belgium) Laurenz Simoens | (Belgium) Cercle Brugge | (Belgium) Gullegem | Loan | |
| January 21, 2017 | (Belgium) Axel Swerten | (Belgium) Lommel United | (Belgium) Hades | Loan | |
| January 21, 2017 | (Belgium) Karel Van Roose | (Belgium) Cercle Brugge | (Belgium) Oosterzonen Oosterwijk | Loan | |
| January 23, 2017 | (Brazil) Jajá Coelho | (Belgium) Lokeren | (Thailand) Buriram United | Loan | |
| January 23, 2017 | (Sweden) Marko Nikolić | (Sweden) AIK | (Belgium) Westerlo | Undisclosed | |
| January 23, 2017 | (Guinea) Mohamed Yattara | (Belgium) Standard Liège | (France) Auxerre | Loan | |
| January 24, 2017 | (Martinique) Steeven Langil | (Poland) Legia Warsaw | (Belgium) Waasland-Beveren | Loan | |
| January 24, 2017 | (Belgium) Davy Roef | (Belgium) Anderlecht | (Spain) Deportivo La Coruña | Loan | |
| January 24, 2017 | (France) Florent Stevance | (Belgium) Charleroi | (Belgium) Roeselare | Loan | |
| January 24, 2017 | (France) Christophe Vincent | (France) Ajaccio | (Belgium) Cercle Brugge | Undisclosed | |
| January 25, 2017 | (Brazil) Danilo Barbosa | (Portugal) Braga | (Belgium) Standard Liège | Loan | |
| January 25, 2017 | (Japan) Yuya Kubo | (Switzerland) Young Boys | (Belgium) Gent | 3.500.000 € | |
| January 25, 2017 | (Spain) Rubén Martínez | (Spain) Deportivo La Coruña | (Belgium) Anderlecht | Loan | |
| January 25, 2017 | (Latvia) Valērijs Šabala | (Belgium) Club Brugge | (Latvia) Riga | Loan | (Note: Šabala was on loan from Club Brugge to DAC Dunajská Streda. The loan ended and Šabala was loaned to Riga.) |
| January 25, 2017 | (Brazil) William Soares | (Belgium) Standard Liège | (Israel) Hapoel Be'er Sheva | Undisclosed | |
| January 25, 2017 | (France) Salimo Sylla | (Belgium) Sint-Truiden | (Greece) Xanthi | Free | |
| January 25, 2017 | (Argentina) Valentín Viola | (Belgium) Excel Mouscron | (Cyprus) Apollon Limassol | Loan Return | |
| January 26, 2017 | (Belgium) Alessio Alessandro | (Belgium) Westerlo | (Belgium) Hades | Loan | |
| January 26, 2017 | (Nigeria) Aliko Bala | (Slovakia) Trenčín | (Belgium) Zulte Waregem | Undisclosed | |
| January 26, 2017 | (Turkey) Hasan Özkan | (Belgium) Mechelen | (Belgium) Oostende | Undisclosed | |
| January 27, 2017 | (Belgium) Beni Badibanga | (Belgium) Standard Liège | (Netherlands) Roda JC | Loan | |
| January 27, 2017 | (France) Samuel Gigot | (Belgium) Kortrijk | (Belgium) Gent | Undisclosed | |
| January 27, 2017 | (France) Jean-Luc Dompé | (Belgium) Standard Liège | (Belgium) Eupen | Loan | |
| January 27, 2017 | (France) Florian Taulemesse | (Belgium) Eupen | (Cyprus) AEK Larnaca | Undisclosed | |
| January 28, 2017 | (Serbia) Vladimir Kovačević | (Serbia) Vojvodina | (Belgium) Kortrijk | Undisclosed | |
| January 30, 2017 | (Denmark) Jakob Ankersen | (Sweden) Göteborg | (Belgium) Zulte Waregem | Undisclosed | |
| January 30, 2017 | (Guinea) Ibrahima Conté | (Belgium) Oostende | (Belgium) Waasland-Beveren | Loan | |
| January 30, 2017 | (Ukraine) Valeriy Luchkevych | (Ukraine) Dnipro Dnipropetrovsk | (Belgium) Standard Liège | Undisclosed | |
| January 30, 2017 | (Belgium) Isaac Mbenza | (Belgium) Standard Liège | (France) Montpellier | Undisclosed | |
| January 30, 2017 | (Democratic Republic of the Congo) Dieumerci Ndongala | (Belgium) Gent | (Belgium) Standard Liège | Undisclosed | |
| January 30, 2017 | (Norway) Mohamed Ofkir | (Norway) Lillestrøm | (Belgium) Lokeren | Undisclosed | |
| January 30, 2017 | (Belgium) Martin Remacle | (Belgium) Standard Liège | (Italy) Torino | Undisclosed | |
| January 30, 2017 | (Australia) Mathew Ryan | (Spain) Valencia | (Belgium) Genk | Loan | |
| January 31, 2017 | (Belgium) Maksym Bah | (Belgium) Excel Mouscron | (Belgium) Westhoek | Loan | |
| January 31, 2017 | (Jamaica) Leon Bailey | (Belgium) Genk | (Germany) Bayer Leverkusen | Undisclosed | |
| January 31, 2017 | (Netherlands) Jean-Paul Boëtius | (Switzerland) Basel | (Belgium) Genk | Loan | |
| January 31, 2017 | (Democratic Republic of the Congo) Merveille Bokadi | (Democratic Republic of the Congo) TP Mazembe | (Belgium) Standard Liège | Loan | |
| January 31, 2017 | (Democratic Republic of the Congo) Jonathan Bolingi | (Democratic Republic of the Congo) TP Mazembe | (Belgium) Standard Liège | Loan | |
| January 31, 2017 | (Belgium) Christian Brüls | (France) Rennes | (Belgium) Eupen | Loan | |
| January 31, 2017 | (Jamaica) Kyle Butler | (Belgium) Genk | (Belgium) Westerlo | Undisclosed | |
| January 31, 2017 | (Croatia) Ljuban Crepulja | (Belgium) Mechelen | (Belarus) Shakhtyor Soligorsk | Loan | |
| January 31, 2017 | (Ivory Coast) Cyriac | (Belgium) Oostende | (England) Fulham | Loan | |
| January 31, 2017 | (Mali) Moussa Djenepo | (Mali) Yeelen Olympique | (Belgium) Standard Liège | Loan | |
| January 31, 2017 | (Belgium) Wout Faes | (Belgium) Anderlecht | (Netherlands) Heerenveen | Loan | |
| January 31, 2017 | (Republic of the Congo) Silvère Ganvoula | (Belgium) Westerlo | (Belgium) Anderlecht | Undisclosed | |
| January 31, 2017 | (Republic of the Congo) Silvère Ganvoula | (Belgium) Anderlecht | (Belgium) Westerlo | Loan | |
| January 31, 2017 | (Belgium) Siebe Horemans | (Belgium) Gent | (Belgium) OH Leuven | Loan | |
| January 31, 2017 | (Belgium) Corentin Koçur | (Belgium) Excel Mouscron | (Belgium) Westhoek | Loan | |
| January 31, 2017 | (Turkey) Halil Ibrahim Köse | (Belgium) Club Brugge | (Belgium) Tubize | Undisclosed | |
| January 31, 2017 | (Republic of the Congo) Kévin Koubemba | (Belgium) Sint-Truiden | (Italy) CSKA Sofia | Undisclosed | |
| January 31, 2017 | (Democratic Republic of the Congo) Nekadi Luyindama | (Democratic Republic of the Congo) TP Mazembe | (Belgium) Standard Liège | Loan | |
| January 31, 2017 | (Brazil) Wallyson Mallmann | (Belgium) Standard Liège | (Portugal) Sporting | Loan Return | |
| January 31, 2017 | (Belgium) Ridwane M'barki | (Belgium) Lommel United | (Belgium) Hasselt | Loan | |
| January 31, 2017 | (Uganda) Farouk Miya | (Belgium) Standard Liège | (Belgium) Excel Mouscron | Loan | |
| January 31, 2017 | (Netherlands) Robert Mühren | (Netherlands) AZ | (Belgium) Zulte Waregem | Undisclosed | |
| January 31, 2017 | (Central African Republic) Quentin Ngakoutou | (France) Monaco | (Belgium) Union SG | Loan | |
| January 31, 2017 | (Belgium) Brice Ntambwe | (Belgium) Lierse | (Belgium) Oosterzonen Oosterwijk | Loan | |
| January 31, 2017 | (Belgium) Jonathan Okita | (Belgium) Standard Liège | (Belgium) Union SG | Loan | |
| January 31, 2017 | (Uruguay) Leandro Rodríguez | (England) Everton | (Belgium) Waasland-Beveren | Loan | |
| January 31, 2017 | (Romania) Dorin Rotariu | (Romania) Dinamo Bucharest | (Belgium) Club Brugge | Undisclosed | |
| January 31, 2017 | (Belgium) Lucas Schoofs | (Belgium) Gent | (Belgium) OH Leuven | Loan | |
| January 31, 2017 | (Ivory Coast) Pierre Zebli | (Italy) Perugia | (Belgium) Genk | Loan | |

=== February ===
| Date | Name | Moving from | Moving to | Fee | Note |
|---|---|---|---|---|---|
| February 1, 2017 | (France) Fabien Boyer | (Belgium) Kortrijk | (France) US Créteil | Undisclosed | |
| February 1, 2017 | (Bosnia and Herzegovina) Haris Hajradinović | (Belgium) Gent | (Norway) Haugesund | Undisclosed | (Note: Hajradinović was already on loan from Gent to Haugesund since the 2015–16 winter transfer window. All parties now agreed to make the transfer permanent.) |
| February 1, 2017 | (Serbia) Jovan Stojanović | (Serbia) Voždovac | (Belgium) Kortrijk | Undisclosed | |

== Sorted by team ==
=== Belgian First Division A teams ===
==== Anderlecht ====
In:

| No. | Pos. | Nation | Player |
|---|---|---|---|
| — | GK | ESP | Rubén Martínez (on loan from (Spain) Deportivo La Coruña) |
| — | FW | SWE | Isaac Kiese Thelin (on loan from (France) Bordeaux) |
| — | MF | FRA | Adrien Trebel (from (Belgium) Standard Liège) |

Out:

| No. | Pos. | Nation | Player |
|---|---|---|---|
| 1 | GK | BEL | Davy Roef (on loan to (Spain) Deportivo La Coruña) |
| 9 | FW | TUN | Hamdi Harbaoui (on loan to (Belgium) Charleroi) |
| 40 | DF | BEL | Wout Faes (on loan to (Netherlands) Heerenveen) |
| 77 | FW | BEL | Nathan Kabasele (on loan to (Belgium) Excel Mouscron) |
| — | FW | BEL | Dylan Lambrecth (signed from (Belgium) RFC Liège, but immediately loaned to (Belgium) Roeselare) |
| — | FW | CGO | Silvère Ganvoula (signed from (Belgium) Westerlo, but immediately loaned back out) |

==== Charleroi ====
In:

| No. | Pos. | Nation | Player |
|---|---|---|---|
| 20 | FW | TUN | Hamdi Harbaoui (on loan from (Belgium) Anderlecht) |
| 29 | MF | BEL | Jordan Remacle (from (Belgium) Antwerp) |

Out:

| No. | Pos. | Nation | Player |
|---|---|---|---|
| 9 | FW | FRA | Florent Stevance (on loan to (Belgium) Roeselare) |
| 29 | MF | GRE | Sotiris Ninis (to (Belgium) Mechelen) |

==== Club Brugge ====
In:

| No. | Pos. | Nation | Player |
|---|---|---|---|
| — | GK | USA | Ethan Horvath (from (Norway) Molde) |
| — | FW | NED | Lex Immers (from (England) Cardiff City) |
| — | DF | COL | Helibelton Palacios (from (Colombia) Deportivo Cali) |
| — | MF | ROU | Dorin Rotariu (from (Romania) Dinamo Bucharest) |

Out:

| No. | Pos. | Nation | Player |
|---|---|---|---|
| 16 | GK | BEL | Sébastien Bruzzese (on loan to (Belgium) Sint-Truiden) |
| 19 | MF | BRA | Felipe Gedoz (to (Brazil) Atlético Paranaense) |
| 42 | MF | BEL | Nikola Storm (on loan to (Belgium) OH Leuven) |
| 44 | DF | BEL | Brandon Mechele (on loan to (Belgium) Sint-Truiden) |
| 63 | FW | BEL | Boli Bolingoli-Mbombo (on loan to (Belgium) Sint-Truiden) |
| — | FW | CHI | Nicolás Castillo (was on loan to (Chile) Universidad Católica, now sold to (Mexico) UNAM) |
| — | MF | TUR | Halil Ibrahim Köse (to (Belgium) Tubize) |
| — | FW | LVA | Valērijs Šabala (was on loan to (Slovakia) DAC Dunajská Streda, now loaned to (Latvia) Riga) |
| — | FW | SWE | Carlos Strandberg (signed from (Russia) CSKA Moscow, then loaned to (Belgium) Westerlo) |

==== Eupen ====
In:

| No. | Pos. | Nation | Player |
|---|---|---|---|
| — | MF | BEL | Christian Brüls (on loan from (France) Rennes) |
| — | MF | FRA | Jean-Luc Dompé (on loan from (Belgium) Standard Liège) |
| — | DF | CIV | Silas Gnaka (from (Senegal) Aspire Academy) |

Out:

| No. | Pos. | Nation | Player |
|---|---|---|---|
| 19 | FW | FRA | Florian Taulemesse (to (Cyprus) AEK Larnaca) |

==== Excel Mouscron ====
In:

| No. | Pos. | Nation | Player |
|---|---|---|---|
| — | DF | BEL | Dino Arslanagić (from (Belgium) Standard Liège) |
| — | FW | BEL | Nathan Kabasele (on loan from (Belgium) Anderlecht) |
| — | FW | LTU | Deivydas Matulevičius (from (Romania) Botoșani) |
| — | MF | UGA | Farouk Miya (on loan from (Belgium) Standard Liège) |

Out:

| No. | Pos. | Nation | Player |
|---|---|---|---|
| 1 | GK | BRA | Vagner (on loan to (Portugal) Boavista) |
| 14 | MF | BEL | Corentin Koçur (on loan to (Belgium) Westhoek) |
| 16 | FW | ARG | Valentín Viola (loan return to (Cyprus) Apollon Limassol) |
| 18 | FW | BEL | Maksym Bah (on loan to (Belgium) Westhoek) |

==== Genk ====
In:

| No. | Pos. | Nation | Player |
|---|---|---|---|
| 25 | MF | NOR | Sander Berge (from (Norway) Vålerenga) |
| — | MF | NED | Jean-Paul Boëtius (on loan from (Switzerland) Basel) |
| — | FW | ESP | José Naranjo (from (Spain) Celta de Vigo) |
| — | GK | AUS | Mathew Ryan (on loan from (Spain) Valencia) |
| — | MF | BEL | Siebe Schrijvers (loan return from (Belgium) Waasland-Beveren) |
| — | MF | CIV | Pierre Zebli (from (Italy) Perugia) |

Out:

| No. | Pos. | Nation | Player |
|---|---|---|---|
| 25 | MF | NGA | Wilfred Ndidi (to (England) Leicester City) |
| 31 | MF | JAM | Leon Bailey (to (Germany) Bayer Leverkusen) |
| — | MF | JAM | Kyle Butler (to (Belgium) Westerlo) |

==== Gent ====
In:

| No. | Pos. | Nation | Player |
|---|---|---|---|
| 6 | DF | BEL | Birger Verstraete (from (Belgium) Kortrijk) |
| 14 | MF | SWE | Tesfaldet Tekie (from (Sweden) Norrköping) |
| 30 | FW | SRB | Darko Bjedov (from (Serbia) Javor Ivanjica) |
| — | DF | FRA | Samuel Gigot (from (Belgium) Kortrijk) |
| — | GK | CRO | Lovre Kalinić (from (Croatia) Hajduk Split) |
| — | FW | NGA | Samuel Kalu (from (Slovakia) Trenčín) |
| — | FW | JPN | Yuya Kubo (from (Switzerland) Young Boys) |
| — | DF | NGA | William Troost-Ekong (loan return from (Norway) Haugesund) |

Out:

| No. | Pos. | Nation | Player |
|---|---|---|---|
| 12 | MF | BEL | Lucas Schoofs (on loan to (Belgium) OH Leuven) |
| 17 | MF | BEL | Hannes Van der Bruggen (to (Belgium) Kortrijk) |
| 23 | DF | DEN | Lasse Nielsen (to (Sweden) Malmö) |
| 28 | DF | BEL | Siebe Horemans (on loan to (Belgium) OH Leuven) |
| 88 | MF | COD | Dieumerci Ndongala (to (Belgium) Standard Liège) |
| — | MF | BIH | Haris Hajradinović (was on loan to (Norway) Haugesund, now sold) |

==== Kortrijk ====
In:

| No. | Pos. | Nation | Player |
|---|---|---|---|
| 5 | FW | FRA | Teddy Chevalier (from (France) Lens) |
| 14 | MF | BEL | Hannes Van der Bruggen (from (Belgium) Gent) |
| — | DF | SRB | Vladimir Kovačević (from (Serbia) Vojvodina) |
| — | MF | SRB | Jovan Stojanović (from (Serbia) Voždovac) |

Out:

| No. | Pos. | Nation | Player |
|---|---|---|---|
| 3 | DF | FRA | Fabien Boyer (to (France) US Créteil) |
| 5 | DF | BEL | Birger Verstraete (to (Belgium) Gent) |
| 9 | FW | GRE | Thanasis Papazoglou (on loan to (Netherlands) Roda JC) |
| 15 | DF | FRA | Romain Métanire (to (France) Reims) |
| 20 | DF | FRA | Samuel Gigot (to (Belgium) Gent) |

==== Lokeren ====
In:

| No. | Pos. | Nation | Player |
|---|---|---|---|
| — | FW | ENG | Gary Martin (from (Iceland) Víkingur) |
| — | MF | NOR | Mohamed Ofkir (from (Norway) Lillestrøm) |

Out:

| No. | Pos. | Nation | Player |
|---|---|---|---|
| 15 | DF | ISL | Sverrir Ingi Ingason (to (Spain) Granada) |
| 70 | FW | BRA | Jajá Coelho (on loan to (Thailand) Buriram United) |

==== Mechelen ====
In:

| No. | Pos. | Nation | Player |
|---|---|---|---|
| — | MF | GRE | Sotiris Ninis (from (Belgium) Charleroi) |

Out:

| No. | Pos. | Nation | Player |
|---|---|---|---|
| 6 | MF | CRO | Ljuban Crepulja (on loan to (Belarus) Shakhtyor Soligorsk) |
| 9 | FW | SRB | Dalibor Veselinović (to (South Korea) Incheon United) |
| — | MF | TUR | Hasan Özkan (to (Belgium) Oostende) |

==== Oostende ====
In:

| No. | Pos. | Nation | Player |
|---|---|---|---|
| — | GK | FRA | William Dutoit (from (Belgium) Sint-Truiden) |
| — | MF | TUR | Hasan Özkan (from (Belgium) Mechelen) |

Out:

| No. | Pos. | Nation | Player |
|---|---|---|---|
| 9 | FW | CIV | Cyriac (on loan to (England) Fulham) |
| 20 | MF | GUI | Ibrahima Conté (on loan to (Belgium) Waasland-Beveren) |

==== Sint-Truiden ====
In:

| No. | Pos. | Nation | Player |
|---|---|---|---|
| — | FW | BEL | Boli Bolingoli-Mbombo (on loan from (Belgium) Club Brugge) |
| — | GK | BEL | Sébastien Bruzzese (on loan from (Belgium) Club Brugge) |
| — | DF | BEL | Brandon Mechele (on loan from (Belgium) Club Brugge) |
| — | FW | ANG | Igor Vetokele (on loan from (England) Charlton Athletic) |

Out:

| No. | Pos. | Nation | Player |
|---|---|---|---|
| 25 | FW | JPN | Yuji Ono (to (Japan) Sagan Tosu) |
| 28 | GK | FRA | William Dutoit (to (Belgium) Oostende) |
| 29 | DF | FRA | Salimo Sylla (to (Greece) Xanthi) |
| 37 | MF | FRA | Jonathan Bamba (loan return to (France) Saint-Étienne) |
| 77 | FW | CGO | Kévin Koubemba (to (Italy) CSKA Sofia) |

==== Standard Liège ====
In:

| No. | Pos. | Nation | Player |
|---|---|---|---|
| 5 | MF | BRA | Danilo Barbosa (on loan from (Portugal) Braga) |
| 10 | MF | COD | Dieumerci Ndongala (from (Belgium) Gent) |
| 18 | MF | ROU | Răzvan Marin (from (Romania) Viitorul Constanța) |
| 25 | DF | SRB | Filip Mladenović (from (Germany) 1. FC Köln) |
| — | MF | COD | Merveille Bokadi (on loan from (Democratic Republic of the Congo) TP Mazembe) |
| — | FW | COD | Jonathan Bolingi (on loan from (Democratic Republic of the Congo) TP Mazembe) |
| — | MF | MLI | Moussa Djenepo (on loan from (Mali) Yeelen Olympique) |
| — | MF | UKR | Valeriy Luchkevych (from (Ukraine) Dnipro Dnipropetrovsk) |
| — | DF | COD | Nekadi Luyindama (on loan from (Democratic Republic of the Congo) TP Mazembe) |

Out:

| No. | Pos. | Nation | Player |
|---|---|---|---|
| 5 | DF | NGA | Elderson Echiéjilé (loan return to (France) Monaco) |
| 10 | MF | FRA | Jean-Luc Dompé (on loan to (Belgium) Eupen) |
| 12 | MF | BEL | Beni Badibanga (on loan to (Netherlands) Roda JC) |
| 14 | FW | BEL | Isaac Mbenza (to (France) Montpellier) |
| 15 | MF | UGA | Farouk Miya (on loan to (Belgium) Excel Mouscron) |
| 18 | MF | FRA | Farès Bahlouli (loan return to (France) Monaco) |
| 19 | MF | GUI | Mohamed Yattara (on loan to (France) Auxerre) |
| 23 | MF | FRA | Adrien Trebel (to (Belgium) Anderlecht) |
| 26 | GK | BEL | Senne Vits (on loan to (Netherlands) MVV Maastricht) |
| 31 | DF | BRA | William Soares (to (Israel) Hapoel Be'er Sheva) |
| 36 | DF | BEL | Dino Arslanagić (to (Belgium) Excel Mouscron) |
| 42 | MF | BRA | Wallyson Mallmann (loan return to (Portugal) Sporting) |
| 60 | MF | MLI | Birama Touré (on loan to (France) Auxerre) |
| — | FW | BEL | Yannis Mbombo (to (Sweden) Örebro) |
| — | MF | BEL | Jonathan Okita (on loan to (Belgium) Union SG) |
| — | MF | BEL | Martin Remacle (to (Italy) Torino) |

==== Waasland-Beveren ====
In:

| No. | Pos. | Nation | Player |
|---|---|---|---|
| — | MF | GUI | Ibrahima Conté (on loan from (Belgium) Oostende) |
| — | MF | MTQ | Steeven Langil (on loan from (Poland) Legia Warsaw) |
| — | FW | SEN | Cherif Ndiaye (from (Senegal) Grand Yoff) |
| — | FW | URU | Leandro Rodríguez (on loan from (England) Everton) |

Out:

| No. | Pos. | Nation | Player |
|---|---|---|---|
| 10 | MF | BEL | Siebe Schrijvers (loan return to (Belgium) Genk) |
| 14 | FW | BEL | Nicolas Orye (on loan to (Belgium) Lommel United) |

==== Westerlo ====
In:

| No. | Pos. | Nation | Player |
|---|---|---|---|
| — | MF | JAM | Kyle Butler (from (Belgium) Genk) |
| — | FW | CGO | Silvère Ganvoula (to (Belgium) Westerlo, but immediately returned on loan) |
| — | FW | SWE | Marko Nikolić (from (Sweden) AIK) |
| — | FW | SWE | Carlos Strandberg (on loan from (Belgium) Club Brugge) |

Out:

| No. | Pos. | Nation | Player |
|---|---|---|---|
| 5 | MF | BEL | Alessio Alessandro (on loan to (Belgium) Hades) |
| 7 | FW | ITA | Eric Lanini (loan return to (Italy) Juventus) |
| 23 | MF | BEL | Jarno Molenberghs (on loan to (Belgium) Lommel United) |
| 33 | FW | GRE | Michalis Manias (to (Greece) Asteras Tripolis) |

==== Zulte-Waregem ====
In:

| No. | Pos. | Nation | Player |
|---|---|---|---|
| 5 | DF | FRA | Yoan Severin (from (Italy) Juventus) |
| — | MF | DEN | Jakob Ankersen (from (Sweden) Göteborg) |
| — | MF | NGA | Aliko Bala (from (Slovakia) Trenčín) |
| — | FW | SEN | Babacar Guèye (on loan from (Germany) Hannover 96) |
| — | FW | NED | Robert Mühren (from (Netherlands) AZ) |

Out:

| No. | Pos. | Nation | Player |
|---|---|---|---|
| 5 | DF | BEL | Bryan Verboom (on loan to (Netherlands) Roda JC) |
| 7 | FW | ANG | Igor Vetokele (loan return to (England) Charlton Athletic) |
| 33 | MF | BEL | Sebastiaan Brebels (on loan to (Belgium) Cercle Brugge) |

=== Belgian First Division B teams ===
==== Antwerp ====
In:

| No. | Pos. | Nation | Player |
|---|---|---|---|
| — | MF | BEL | Faris Haroun (from (Belgium) Cercle Brugge) |

Out:

| No. | Pos. | Nation | Player |
|---|---|---|---|
| 7 | MF | BEL | Jordan Remacle (to (Belgium) Charleroi) |
| 16 | DF | BEL | Jordy Verstraeten (to (Belgium) Eendracht Aalst) |
| 29 | DF | BEL | Michiel Jaeken (on loan to (Belgium) Deinze) |
| — | MF | MTQ | Mickael Malsa (released) |

==== Cercle Brugge ====
In:

| No. | Pos. | Nation | Player |
|---|---|---|---|
| 1 | GK | FRA | Paul Nardi (on loan from (France) Monaco) |
| 7 | FW | BEL | Ilombe Mboyo (on loan from (Switzerland) Sion) |
| 8 | FW | GUI | Tafsir Chérif (on loan from (France) Monaco) |
| 18 | DF | FRA | Mehdi Beneddine (on loan from (France) Monaco) |
| — | MF | BEL | Sebastiaan Brebels (on loan from (Belgium) Zulte Waregem) |
| — | MF | FRA | Christophe Vincent (from (France) Ajaccio) |

Out:

| No. | Pos. | Nation | Player |
|---|---|---|---|
| 28 | MF | BEL | Karel Van Roose (on loan to (Belgium) Oosterzonen Oosterwijk) |
| 38 | MF | BEL | Faris Haroun (to (Belgium) Antwerp) |
| 98 | FW | BEL | Laurenz Simoens (on loan to (Belgium) Gullegem) |

==== Lierse ====
In:

| No. | Pos. | Nation | Player |
|---|---|---|---|
| — | MF | MLI | Boubacar Diarra (from (Egypt) Wadi Degla) |

Out:

| No. | Pos. | Nation | Player |
|---|---|---|---|
| 15 | MF | EGY | Amr Barakat (to (Egypt) Al Ahly) |
| 39 | MF | BEL | Brice Ntambwe (on loan to (Belgium) Oosterzonen Oosterwijk) |
| 40 | MF | EGY | Zizo (on loan to (Portugal) Nacional) |

==== Lommel United ====
In:

| No. | Pos. | Nation | Player |
|---|---|---|---|
| — | DF | BEL | Wouter Corstjens (from (Greece) Panetolikos) |
| — | MF | BEL | Jarno Molenberghs (on loan from (Belgium) Westerlo) |
| — | FW | BEL | Nicolas Orye (on loan from (Belgium) Waasland-Beveren) |

Out:

| No. | Pos. | Nation | Player |
|---|---|---|---|
| 5 | DF | BEL | Axel Swerten (on loan to (Belgium) Hades) |
| 15 | FW | BEL | Jason Adesanya (to (Belgium) Rupel Boom) |
| 31 | MF | NED | Issam Al Kamouchi (was on loan to (Belgium) Hades, now released) |
| — | FW | BEL | Ridwane M'barki (on loan to (Belgium) Hasselt) |

==== OH Leuven ====
In:

| No. | Pos. | Nation | Player |
|---|---|---|---|
| 26 | GK | BEL | Laurent Henkinet (free agent) |
| 29 | MF | BEL | Leo Njengo (from (Belgium) Dessel Sport) |
| 31 | MF | BEL | Nikola Storm (on loan from (Belgium) Club Brugge) |
| — | DF | BEL | Siebe Horemans (on loan from (Belgium) Gent) |
| — | MF | BEL | Lucas Schoofs (on loan from (Belgium) Gent) |

Out:

| No. | Pos. | Nation | Player |
|---|---|---|---|
| 18 | FW | BEL | Tuur Houben (to (Netherlands) MVV Maastricht) |
| 26 | GK | ISR | Ram Strauss (released) |

==== Roeselare ====
In:

| No. | Pos. | Nation | Player |
|---|---|---|---|
| — | FW | BEL | Dylan Lambrecth (on loan from (Belgium) Anderlecht) |
| — | FW | FRA | Florent Stevance (on loan from (Belgium) Charleroi) |

Out:

| No. | Pos. | Nation | Player |
|---|---|---|---|
| 15 | DF | BEL | Tom Raes (on loan to (Belgium) Hamme) |

==== Tubize ====
In:

| No. | Pos. | Nation | Player |
|---|---|---|---|
| — | MF | TUR | Halil Ibrahim Köse (from (Belgium) Club Brugge) |

Out:

| No. | Pos. | Nation | Player |
|---|---|---|---|
| 28 | FW | FRA | Kévin Lefaix (to (France) Chambly) |
| 88 | MF | GEO | Levan Shengelia (on loan to (South Korea) Daejeon Citizen) |

==== Union SG ====
In:

| No. | Pos. | Nation | Player |
|---|---|---|---|
| — | FW | CTA | Quentin Ngakoutou (on loan from (France) Monaco) |
| — | MF | BEL | Jonathan Okita (on loan from (Belgium) Standard Liège) |

Out:

| No. | Pos. | Nation | Player |
|---|---|---|---|
| 9 | FW | GLP | Mickaël Antoine-Curier (on loan to (Belgium) Eendracht Aalst) |
