= Sagi Strauss =

Israeli footballer

Sagi Strauss שגיא שטראוס
Personal information
- Date of birth: 29 June 1976 (age 50)
- Place of birth: Yokneam Moshava, Israel
- Position: Goalkeeper

Youth career
- 1986–1993: Maccabi Haifa

Senior career*
Years	Team	Apps	(Gls)
1993–1995	Maccabi Haifa	2	(0)
1993–1994	→ Hapoel Acre (loan)	23	(0)
1995–1996	Beitar Tel Aviv	25	(0)
1996–1998	Hapoel Ironi Rishon LeZion	53	(0)
1998–1999	Hapoel Kfar Saba	26	(0)
1999–2000	Ironi Rishon LeZion	23	(0)
2000–2001	Maccabi Ahi Nazareth	–	(–)
2001–2002	Hapoel Beit She'an	12	(0)
2002–2003	Maccabi Petah Tikva	6	(0)
2003–2004	Bnei Sakhnin	17	(0)
2004–2005	Hapoel Haifa	33	(0)
2005–2006	Hapoel Ironi Kiryat Shmona	32	(0)
2006–2007	Hapoel Nazareth Illit	33	(0)
2007–2008	Beitar Jerusalem	1	(0)
2008–2009	Maccabi Ironi Kiryat Ata	26	(0)
2009–2010	Ahva Arraba	30	(0)
2010	Hapoel Ramot Menashe Megiddo	0	(0)

International career
1998	Israel	1	(0)
- * Club domestic league appearances and goals

Sagi Strauss (Hebrew: שגיא שטראוס; born 29 June 1976) is an Israeli former professional footballer who played as a goalkeeper.

== Early and personal life ==
Strauss was born in moshav Yokneam Moshava, Israel, to a family of Ashkenazi Jewish descent. His brother Ram Strauss is an association footballer as well.

His sister Alvit Strauss married Argentine footballer Roberto Colautti in 2005, and on account of their marriage Colautti became an Israeli citizen in 2007 and played for the Israel national team, as well as four daughters together.

== Honours ==
- State Cup (1):
  - 2003–04
