= Eric Lanini =

Italian footballer (born 1994)

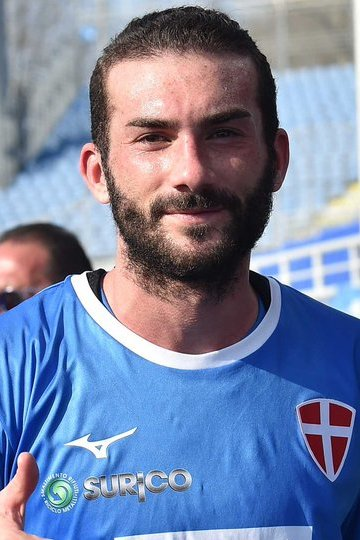
- Lanini with Novara in 2021

Personal information
- Date of birth: 25 February 1994 (age 32)
- Place of birth: Turin, Italy
- Height: 1.86 m (6 ft 1 in)
- Position: Striker

Team information
- Current team: Novara
- Number: 7

Youth career
- –2013: Juventus

Senior career*
Years	Team	Apps	(Gls)
2013–2020	Juventus	0	(0)
2013–2014	→ Prato (loan)	22	(7)
2014–2015	→ Virtus Entella (loan)	18	(3)
2015–2016	→ Virtus Lanciano (loan)	16	(1)
2016	→ Como (loan)	13	(0)
2016–2017	→ Westerlo (loan)	4	(0)
2017	→ Matera (loan)	12	(3)
2017–2018	→ Vicenza (loan)	16	(3)
2018	→ Padova (loan)	8	(0)
2018–2019	→ Imolese (loan)	33	(14)
2019–2020	→ Juventus U23 (res.)	17	(3)
2020–2024	Parma	0	(0)
2020	→ Como (loan)	2	(0)
2020–2021	→ Novara (loan)	34	(11)
2021–2024	→ Reggiana (loan)	79	(26)
2024	→ Benevento (loan)	14	(7)
2024–2025	Benevento	32	(11)
2025–	Novara	31	(9)

International career
2014	Italy U20	1	(0)
- * Club domestic league appearances and goals as of 30 April 2026

Eric Lanini (born 25 February 1994) is an Italian footballer who plays as a striker for Serie C Group A club Novara.

== Club career ==
=== Loan to Prato ===
On 2 September 2013, Lanini was loaned to Serie C side Prato on a season-long loan deal. On 8 September he made his debut for Prato as a substitute replacing Christian Tiboni in the 59th minute of a 0–0 home draw against Catanzaro. On 13 October, Lanini played his first entire match for Prato, a 2–2 away draw against Pontedera, he scored his first professional goal in the 37th minute and again in the 80th minute. On 20 October he scored his third goal in the 75th minute of a 4–1 home win over Nocerina. On 27 October he scored his fourth goal in the 70th minute of a 2–0 away win over Viareggio. On 10 November, Lanini scored his fifth goal in the 82nd minute of a 3–3 home draw against Frosinone. On 31 January 2014, half of the registration rights of Lanini, was exchanged with half of the registration rights of Edoardo Goldaniga of Palermo. Lanini remained with Prato for the rest of 2013–14 Lega Pro Prima Divisione season. Lanini ended his season-long loan to Prato with 22 appearances, 7 goals and 1 assist. In June 2014 the co-ownerships were renewed.

=== Loan to Virtus Entella ===
On 24 July 2014, Lanini was loaned with a season-long loan deal to Serie B side Virtus Entella. On 28 October he made his Serie B debut for Virtus Entella as a substitute replacing Gianluca Litteri in the 72nd minute and in the 76th minute he scored his first goal for Virtus Entella in a 5–1 away defeat against Catania. On 1 November, Lanini played his first match for Virtus Entella as a starter in a 0–0 home draw against Virus Lanciano, he was replaced by Gianluca Litteri in the 65th minute. On 4 November he scored his second goal in the 27th minute of a 2–1 home win over Ternana. On 28 February 2015, Lanini played his first entire match for Virtus Entella and in the 19th minute he scored his third goal in a 5–2 home defeat against Pescara. Lanini ended his season-long loan to Virtus Entella with 18 appearances and 3 goals. On 25 June, Juventus bought back Lanini, as well as Palermo bought back Goldaniga. Lanini signed a 3-year contract with Juventus.

=== Loan to Virtus Lanciano and Como ===
On 21 July 2015, Lanini was signed by Serie B club Virtus Lanciano on a season-long loan deal with option to buy. On 9 August he made his debut for Lanciano in a 2–0 home defeat against Juve Stabia in the second round of Coppa Italia, he played the entire match. On 6 September, Lanini made his Serie B debut for Lanciano as a substitute replacing Antonio Rozzi in the 46th minute of a 2–1 away defeat against Pro Vercelli. On 19 September he scored his first goal for Lanciano, as a substitute, in the 81st minute of a 1–1 away draw against Trapani. On 26 September, Lanini played his first match as a starter for Lanciano in Serie B, a 1–0 away defeat against Modena, he was replaced by Stefano Padovan in the 90th minute. In January 2016, Lanini returned to Juventus leaving Virtus Lanciano with 17 appearances, only 2 as a starter, and 1 goal.

On 28 January, Lanini was signed by Serie B side Como on a 6-month loan deal. On 30 January he made his Serie B debut for Como as a substitute replacing Abdelkader Ghezzal in the 56th minute of a 1–1 home draw against Vicenza. On 19 March, Lanini played his first match as a starter for Como, a 2–1 away win over Modena, he was replaced by Joshua Brillante in the 61st minute. On 19 April he played his first entire match for Como, a 1–1 home draw against Cagliari. Lanini ended his loan to Como with 13 appearances, 4 as a starter, and 1 assist.

=== Loan to Westerlo and Matera ===
On 21 July 2016, Lanini moved to Belgium for Westerlo. On 21 September he made his debut for Westerlo as a starter in a 1–0 home defeat against Tubize in the round of 32 of the Belgian Cup, he was replaced by Jarno Molenberghs in the 60th minute. On 13 August, Lanini made his league debut for Westerlo as a substitute replacing Elton Acolatse in the 75th minute of a 2–1 home defeat against Eupen. Lanini, in January, was recall to Juventus after only 5 appearances for Westerlo.

On 19 January 2017, Lanini was signed by Serie C side Matera on a 6-month loan deal. On 28 January, Lanini made his debut for Matera as a starter in a 1–0 home win over Vibonese, he was replaced by Francesco De Rose in the 69th minute. On 12 February he scored his first goal for Matera, as a substitute, in the 79th minute of a 3–2 home defeat against Virtus Francavilla. On 5 March, Lanini scored his second goal in the 64th minute 3–1 away defeat against Catanzaro. On 26 March he played his first entire match for Matera, a 5–1 home win over Messina, in this match he scored his third goal in the 29th minute. Lanini ended his loan to Matera with 12 appearances and 3 goals.

=== Loan to Vicenza and Padova ===
On 23 August 2017, Lanini was signed by Serie C side Vicenza on a season-long loan deal. On 27 August he made his Serie C debut for Vicenza as a substitute replacing Luzayadio Bangu in the 81st minute of a 3–0 home win over Gubbio. On 23 October, Lanini played his first match for Vicenza as a starter, a 3–1 home defeat against Triestina, he was replaced by Pietro De Giorgio in the 69th minute. On 13 November, Lanini scored his first goal for Vicenza, as a substitute, in the 68th minute of a 2–1 away defeat against Santarcangelo. On 24 November he scored his second goal, again as a substitute, in the 71st minute of a 3–1 away defeat against Pordenone. On 2 December he played his first entire match for Vicenza, a 2–0 home defeat against Ravenna. On 22 December he scored his third goal in the 68th minute of a 1–1 away draw against Gubbio. In January 2018 he was re-called to Juventus leaving Vicenza with 16 appearances and 3 goals.

On 30 January 2018, Lanini was signed by Serie C club Padova on a 6-month loan deal. On 3 February he made his debut for Padova as a substitute replacing Alessandro Capello in the 83rd minute of a 1–1 home draw against Sambenedettese. Lanini ended his 6-month loan to Padova with 8 appearances, all as a substitute, but Padova won the Serie C title.

=== Loan to Imolese ===
On 10 August 2018, Lanini was loaned to Serie C club Imolese on a season-long loan deal. On 18 September he made his Serie C debut for Imolese in a 0–0 away draw against AlbinoLeffe, he was replaced by Giuseppe Giovinco in the 64th minute. On 14 October he scored his first goal for Imolese, as a substitute, in the 52nd minute of a 1–0 home win over Gubbio. Three days later he scored his second goal in the 4th minute of a 2–1 away defeat against Sambenedettese. Four more days later, on 21 October, he scored his third consecutive goals in the 66th minute of a 3–1 home win over Rimini. On 26 December he received a red card, as a substitute, in the 90th minute of a 2–2 home draw against Ravenna. On 9 February 2019, Lanini scored his first brace for Imolese in a 3–2 away win over Gubbio. Lanini ended his season-long loan to Imolese with 37 appearances, 15 goals and 1 assist.

=== Juventus U23 ===
On 18 August 2019, Lanini debuted for Juventus U23 — the reserve team of Juventus — in a Coppa Italia Serie C match drawn 3–3 against Reggio Audace in which he scored a hat-trick allowing his team advance to the knock-out stage of the cup. On 26 August, Lanini debuted in Serie C in a 2–0 defeat to Novara. Lanini scored his first goal in Serie C on 6 October helping his team 1–0 against Pianese. Lanini stayed at Juventus U23 until January 2020 and scored three league goals in 17 appearances.

==== Loan to Como ====
On 31 January 2020, Lanini's rights were bought by Parma, who immediately loaned him to Como.

==== Loan to Novara ====
On 5 October 2020 he joined Novara on loan.

==== Loan to Reggiana ====
On 31 August 2021, he joined Reggiana. On 26 July 2022, the loan was extended for two more seasons.

==== Loan to Benevento ====
On 17 January 2024, Lanini moved on a new loan to Benevento.

== International career ==
Lanini represented Italy at only Under-20 level and he collected 1 cap. On 9 September 2014 he made his debut at Under-20 level as a substitute replacing Matteo Ricci in the 46th minute of a 3–1 home defeat against Poland U-20.

== Career statistics ==
=== Club ===
As of match played 30 April 2022

Club	Season	League			National Cup		Other		Total	
Club	Season	League	Apps	Goals	Apps	Goals	Apps	Goals	Apps	Goals
Juventus	2012–13	Serie A	0	0	0	0	—		0	0
Prato (loan)	2013–14	Serie C	22	7	0	0	—		22	7
Virtus Entella (loan)	2014–15	Serie B	18	3	0	0	—		18	3
Virtus Lanciano (loan)	2015–16	Serie B	16	1	1	0	—		17	1
Como (loan)	2015–16	Serie B	13	0	—		—		13	0
Westerlo (loan)	2016–17	First Division A	4	0	1	0	—		5	0
Matera (loan)	2016–17	Serie C	12	3	—		—		12	3
Vicenza (loan)	2017–18	Serie C	17	3	0	0	—		17	3
Padova (loan)	2017–18	Serie C	8	0	—		—		8	0
Imolese (loan)	2018–19	Serie C	33	14	0	0	4 (Note: All appearance(s) in Serie C play-off.)	1	37	15
Juventus U23	2019–20	Serie C	17	3	—		1+ (Note: Appearances in Coppa Italia Serie C)	3+	18+	6+
Parma	2019–20	Serie A	0	0	0	0	0	0	0	0
Como (loan)	2019–20	Serie C	2	0	0	0	0	0	2	0
Novara (loan)	2020–21	Serie C	35	10	—		—		35	10
Reggiana (loan)	2021–22	Serie C	34	15	—				34	15
Career total			235	60	3	0	5+	4+	243+	64+

== Honours ==
=== Club ===
Juventus Primavera

- Torneo di Viareggio: 2012
- Coppa Italia Primavera: 2012–13
- Supercoppa Primavera: 2013

Padova

- Serie C: 2017–18
