= Hasan Özkan =

Belgian-born Turkish footballer

Personal information
- Date of birth: 14 November 1997 (age 28)
- Place of birth: Jette, Belgium
- Height: 1.78 m (5 ft 10 in)
- Position: Midfielder

Team information
- Current team: Manisa 1965 Spor
- Number: 27

Youth career
- –2014: KV Mechelen
- 2014–2016: Gent

Senior career*
Years	Team	Apps	(Gls)
2017–2020	Oostende	21	(1)
2021	Balıkesirspor	9	(0)
2021	Yeni Malatyaspor	0	(0)
2022–2023	KVK Ninove	15	(0)
2023–	Manisa 1965 Spor	15	(1)

International career
2012–2013	Turkey U16	10	(0)
2013–2014	Turkey U17	11	(0)
2015	Turkey U18	1	(0)
2015	Turkey U19	3	(0)
- * Club domestic league appearances and goals as of 21:25, 24 March 2024 (UTC)

Hasan Özkan (born 14 November 1997) is a Belgium-born Turkish football player who currently plays for Turkish side Manisa 1965 Spor. He also holds Belgian citizenship.

== Club career ==
Özkan made his professional debut in the Belgian First Division A for Oostende on 4 February 2017 in a game against KV Mechelen.

== International ==
Özkan is a youth international for Turkey at the U16, U17, U18, and U19 levels. He participated in the 2014 UEFA European Under-17 Championship for the Turkey national under-17 football team.
