= Din Sula =

Belgian footballer

Personal information
- Date of birth: 2 March 1998 (age 28)
- Place of birth: Brussels, Belgium
- Height: 1.85 m (6 ft 1 in)
- Position: Forward

Team information
- Current team: Concordia Chiajna
- Number: 25

Youth career
- 2005–2008: Woluwe-Zaventem
- 2008–2011: Diegem Sport
- 2011–2016: OH Leuven

Senior career*
| Years | Team | Apps | (Gls) |
| 2015–2018 | OH Leuven | 12 | (1) |
| 2017–2018 | → Lommel (loan) | 34 | (19) |
| 2018–2021 | Waasland-Beveren | 26 | (3) |
| 2021–2023 | Virton | 14 | (2) |
| 2022 | → Patro Eisden (loan) | 8 | (1) |
| 2022–2023 | → Knokke (loan) | 27 | (22) |
| 2023–2025 | Odra Opole | 21 | (5) |
| 2025–2026 | Hoek | 28 | (21) |
| 2026– | Concordia Chiajna | 11 | (7) |

International career
| 2015 | Belgium U17 | 1 | (0) |
| 2016–2017 | Belgium U19 | 5 | (1) |
| 2019 | Albania U21 | 3 | (1) |
- * Club domestic league appearances and goals as of 1 November 2026

Din Sula (born 2 March 1998) is a professional footballer who plays as a forward for Liga II club Concordia Chiajna. Born in Belgium, Sula represented his country of birth at youth level, before switching to Albania in 2018.

== Career ==
Sula played his first official match for OHL in June 2015 during the 2015 Belgian Second Division play-offs when he came on as a substitute in a 0–0 draw at home to Lierse. Half a year later on 21 November 2015, he played his first match in the Belgian Pro League when he was in the starting lineup at home against Genk.

On 5 August 2026, Sula joined Liga II club Concordia Chiajna in Romania.

== Personal life ==
Sula is of Kosovan Albanian descent. His brother Drin is also a footballer, currently playing for Belisia Bilzen.
