= Robin Peeters =

Belgian footballer

Personal information
- Full name: Robin Peeters
- Date of birth: 30 March 1997 (age 29)
- Place of birth: Belgium
- Height: 1.78 m (5 ft 10 in)
- Position: Midfielder

Team information
- Current team: Pepingen-Halle

Youth career
- –2017: OH Leuven

Senior career*
Years	Team	Apps	(Gls)
2016–2017	OH Leuven	2	(0)
2017–2018	Sint-Truiden	0	(0)
2018–2019	ASV Geel	10	(0)
2019–2020	UT Pétange	1	(0)
2020–2021	Olympia Wijgmaal	2	(0)
2021–2022	Rupel Boom	26	(0)
2022–2025	Tempo Overijse		
2025–	Pepingen-Halle		
- * Club domestic league appearances and goals as of 14 February 2018

Robin Peeters (born 30 March 1997) is a Belgian professional footballer who plays for Pepingen-Halle in the Belgian Provincial Leagues.

Peeters made his professional debut for OH Leuven on 8 January 2017 in the away match against Union SG.
