= Serge Tabekou =

Cameroonian footballer

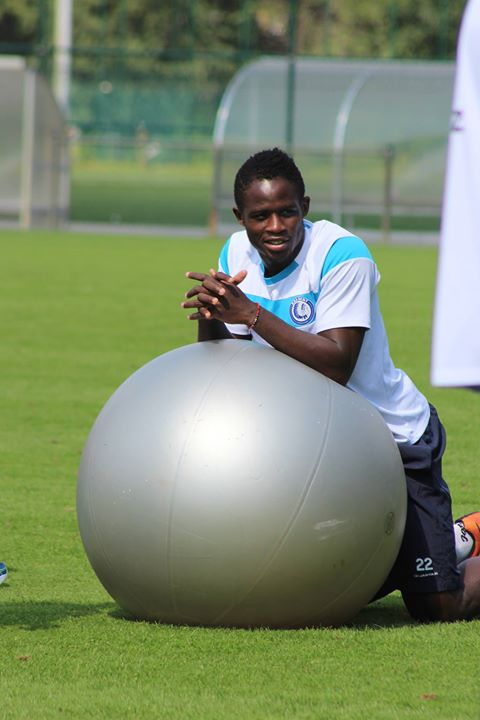
- Tabekou in 2015

Personal information
- Full name: Serge Tabekou
- Date of birth: 15 October 1996 (age 30)
- Place of birth: Yaoundé, Cameroon
- Height: 1.80 m (5 ft 11 in)
- Position: Forward

Team information
- Current team: Krasava ENY Ypsonas FC
- Number: 13

Senior career*
Years	Team	Apps	(Gls)
2014–2015	APEJES Academy		
2015–2017	Gent	2	(1)
2016	→ Sedan (loan)	14	(3)
2016–2017	→ OH Leuven (loan)	32	(3)
2017–2020	Union SG	77	(11)
2020–2022	Excel Mouscron	30	(4)
2021–2022	→ Manisa (loan)	27	(3)
2022–2023	Lierse Kempenzonen	24	(6)
2023	Qingdao Hainiu	18	(0)
2023–2024	Al-Bukiryah	9	(1)
2024	Chongqing Tonglianglong	30	(4)
2025	Nea Salamina	13	(1)
2025–2026	Tirana	35	(9)
2026–	Krasava ENY Ypsonas FC	6	(2)

International career^{‡}
2020–	Cameroon	5	(1)
- * Club domestic league appearances and goals as of 25 October 2026 ‡ National team caps and goals as of 27 November 2020

Serge Tabekou (born 15 October 1996) is a Cameroonian footballer who plays for Krasava ENY Ypsonas FC as a forward.

== Club career ==
Tabekou started his professional career in Cameroon with APEJES Academy but moved to Gent in January 2015. After having only trained twice with the main squad and while still being unknown to the fans and most players, he was brought on as a substitute in the final fifteen minutes and scored a goal just before the end of the match to help his team win 3–1 away to Standard Liège.

On 4 April 2023, Tabekou joined Chinese Super League club Qingdao Hainiu.

On 12 September 2023, Tabekou joined Saudi First Division League club Al-Bukiryah. He was released on 22 January 2024.

On 24 February 2024, Tabekou returned to China and signed a with China League One club Chongqing Tonglianglong.

== International career ==
Tabekou made his debut with the Cameroon national team in a friendly 0–0 tie with Japan on 9 October 2020.

== Career statistics ==
=== Club ===
As of match played 28 April 2025

Appearances and goals by club, season and competition
Club	Season	League			Cup		Continental		Other		Total	
Club	Season	Division	Apps	Goals	Apps	Goals	Apps	Goals	Apps	Goals	Apps	Goals0
Gent	2014–15	Belgian Pro League	1	1	—		—		—		1	1
Gent	2015–16	Belgian Pro League	1	0	0	0	0	0	0	0	1	0
Gent	Total		2	1	0	0	0	0	0	0	2	1
Sedan (loan)	2015–16	National	14	3	—		—		—		14	3
OH Leuven (loan)	2016–17	Belgian First Division B	32	3	1	0	—		—		33	3
Union SG	2017–18	Belgian First Division B	24	2	2	1	—		—		26	3
Union SG	2018–19	Belgian First Division B	27	1	3	0	—		—		30	1
Union SG	2019–20	Belgian First Division B	26	8	1	0	—		—		27	8
Union SG	Total		77	11	6	1	—		—		83	12
Excel Mouscron	2020–21	Belgian First Division A	30	4	0	0	—		—		30	4
Manisa (loan)	2021–22	1. Lig	27	3	2	1	—		—		29	4
Lierse Kempenzonen	2022–23	Challenger Pro League	24	6	1	1	—		—		25	7
Qingdao Hainiu	2023	Chinese Super League	18	0	0	0	—		—		18	0
Al-Bukiryah	2023–24	Saudi First Division	9	1	—		—		—		9	1
Chongqing Tonglianglong	2024	China League One	30	4	1	0	—		—		31	4
Nea Salamina	2024–25	Cypriot First Division	13	1	—		—		—		13	1
Career total			276	37	11	3	0	0	0	0	287	40

== Honours ==
Gent

- Belgian Super Cup: 2015
