= Sebastiaan Brebels =

Belgian footballer

Personal information
- Date of birth: 5 May 1995 (age 31)
- Place of birth: Aalst, Belgium
- Height: 1.84 m (6 ft 0 in)
- Position: Central midfielder

Team information
- Current team: HSV Hoek
- Number: 8

Youth career
- –2007: Dender
- 2007–2010: Gent
- 2010–2013: Anderlecht
- 2013–2014: Zulte-Waregem

Senior career*
Years	Team	Apps	(Gls)
2014–2017	Zulte-Waregem	12	(0)
2017	→ Cercle Brugge (loan)	13	(0)
2017–2021	Lommel	100	(8)
2021–2022	KA	23	(2)
2022–2024	Lierse Kempenzonen	45	(1)
2024–2026	Lokeren	54	(7)
2026–	HSV Hoek	8	(0)

International career^{‡}
2010	Belgium U15	1	(0)
- * Club domestic league appearances and goals as of 3 October 2026 ‡ National team caps and goals as of 17 March 2010

Sebastiaan Brebels (born 5 May 1995) is a Belgian professional footballer who plays as a midfielder for Dutch Tweede Divisie club HSV Hoek.

== Career ==
Born in Aalst, Brebels played with Dender, Gent, R.S.C. Anderlecht and Zulte-Waregem as a junior. He made his first team debut with S.V. Zulte Waregem on 17 December 2014 in the Belgian Cup in a 0–3 home defeat against Anderlecht. He played 67 minutes, before being substituted by Charni Ekangamene.

On 21 January 2021, he moved to KA in Iceland.

Brebels returned to Belgium on 28 June 2022, signing with Lierse Kempenzonen.
