= Jonathan Kindermans =

Belgian footballer

Personal information
- Full name: Jonathan Kindermans
- Date of birth: 27 December 1994 (age 31)
- Place of birth: Anderlecht, Belgium
- Height: 1.77 m (5 ft 10 in)
- Position: Attacking midfielder

Youth career
- –2014: Anderlecht

Senior career*
Years	Team	Apps	(Gls)
2014–2015	Anderlecht	0	(0)
2014–2015	→ Telstar (loan)	31	(6)
2015–2016	RKC Waalwijk	17	(2)
2016–2017	OH Leuven	21	(0)
2017–2018	KV Mechelen	0	(0)
2018	→ Union SG (loan)	5	(1)
2018–2019	RWDM47	0	(0)
2019–2020	Lierse Kempenzonen	0	(0)
- * Club domestic league appearances and goals as of 2 May 2018

Jonathan Kindermans (born 27 December 1994) is a Belgian footballer who plays as an attacking midfielder, but is currently unemployed after most recently playing for Lierse Kempenzonen in the Belgian First Amateur Division. His former clubs include Telstar, RKC Waalwijk, OH Leuven and KV Mechelen.

== Career statistics ==
As of match played 7 January 2018

Appearances and goals by club, season and competition
Club	Season	League			National Cup		Other		Total	
Club	Season	Division	Apps	Goals	Apps	Goals	Apps	Goals	Apps	Goals
Telstar (loan)	2014–15	Eerste Divisie	31	6	1	0	—		32	6
RKC Waalwijk	2015–16	Eerste Divisie	17	2	1	0	—		18	2
OH Leuven	2016–17	First Division B	21	2	2	0	0	0	23	2
KV Mechelen	2017–18	First Division A	0	0	0	0	0	0	0	0
Union SG (loan)	2017–18	First Division B	1	0	—		0	0	1	0
Career statistics			70	10	4	0	0	0	74	10
