= Leon Bailey =

Jamaican footballer (born 1997)

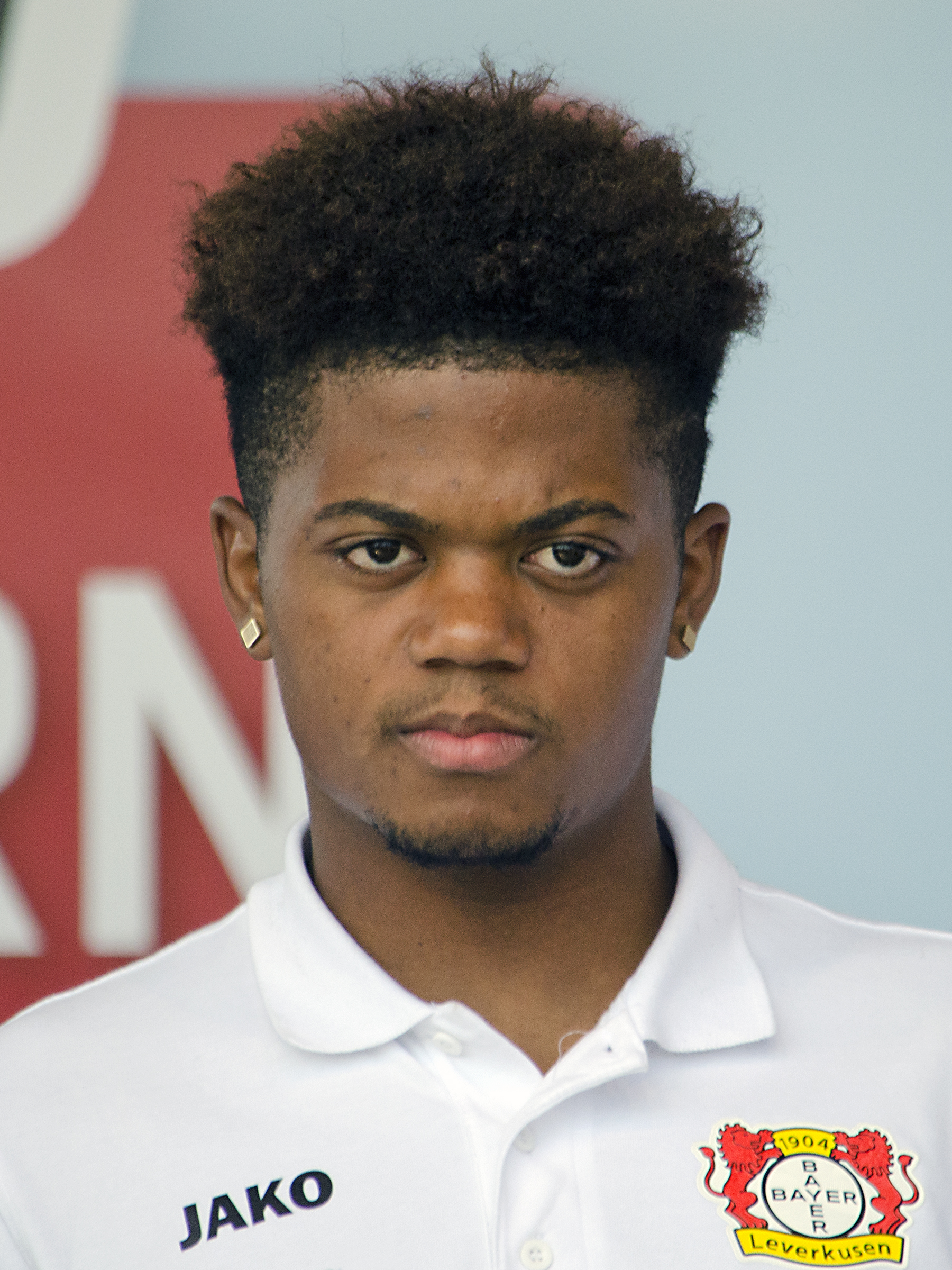
- Bailey with Bayer Leverkusen in 2018

Personal information
- Full name: Leon Patrick Bailey
- Date of birth: 9 August 1997 (age 29)
- Place of birth: Kingston, Jamaica
- Height: 1.78 m (5 ft 10 in)
- Position: Right winger

Team information
- Current team: Olympiacos
- Number: 17

Youth career
- 2009–2011: Phoenix All-Star Academy
- 2011: Anif Jugend
- 2011–2013: Liefering
- 2013–2015: Trenčín

Senior career*
| Years | Team | Apps | (Gls) |
| 2015–2017 | Genk | 56 | (8) |
| 2017–2021 | Bayer Leverkusen | 119 | (28) |
| 2021–2026 | Aston Villa | 123 | (16) |
| 2025–2026 | → Roma (loan) | 7 | (0) |
| 2026– | Olympiacos | 3 | (3) |

International career^{‡}
| 2015 | Jamaica U23 | 1 | (1) |
| 2019– | Jamaica | 41 | (7) |
- * Club domestic league appearances and goals as of 20:44, 22 November 2026 (UTC) ‡ National team caps and goals as of 08:13, 1 April 2026 (UTC)

Leon Patrick Bailey (born 9 August 1997) is a Jamaican professional footballer who plays as a right winger for Super League Greece club Olympiacos and the Jamaica national team.

Bailey arrived in Europe at the age of 13 and played for a number of clubs at youth level before being signed by Belgian side Genk in 2015, where he was named Belgian Young Footballer of the Year. His success in Belgium earned him a move to Bundesliga side Bayer Leverkusen in 2017. After four years at the club, he was signed by Aston Villa in 2021 for a fee of around £30 million.

== Club career ==
=== Early career ===
Bailey started his career playing for the Phoenix All-Star Academy operated by his adoptive father, Craig Butler. In 2011, Butler arrived in Europe to find a club for Bailey and Butler's biological son, Kyle. Bailey caught the eye of Genk in Belgium, but because of the very strict regulations on minors by FIFA, they could not offer him a contract. Bailey almost joined Standard Liège, but the transfer was not approved because Butler had no work permit. Aged 13, Bailey signed for Austrian non-league side Anif Jugend, before moving to Liefering.

In the beginning of 2013, Bailey signed a professional contract with Slovak side Trenčín. In October 2013, Bailey reached a verbal agreement with Ajax, but a transfer did not materialise due to FIFA rules.

=== Genk ===
Bailey joined Genk in 2015 from Trenčín. He made his Belgian Pro League debut on 21 August 2015 in a 3–1 away defeat against Sint-Truiden replacing Siebe Schrijvers after 62 minutes. He scored his first professional goal for KRC Genk on 21 November versus OH Leuven. At the end of the 2015–16 season he won the Belgian Young Footballer of the Year award. His goal in the Europa League against Rapid Wien on 15 September 2016 was chosen as the top goal of the competition for the 2016–17 season by UEFA.

=== Bayer Leverkusen ===
Bailey joined Bayer Leverkusen in January 2017 for a fee of €20 million, after interest from Manchester United and Chelsea. He made his debut for Leverkusen on 3 February 2017, in a 1–0 defeat against Hamburg. His Champions League debut came on 24 February 2017, in a 2–2 draw against Atlético Madrid. He made ten appearances for Leverkusen in his first half season at the club.

He scored his first goal for the club on 11 August 2017, in the first game of the 2017–18 season in a 3–0 victory in the German Cup against Karlsruher SC. His first league goal for the club came on 29 September against Schalke 04. He finished the season scoring 12 goals in 34 games in all competitions, helping guide Bayer Leverkusen to a fifth-place finish in the Bundesliga. On 30 November 2019, he scored twice in a 2–1 win over champions Bayern Munich, one goal with each foot.

=== Aston Villa ===
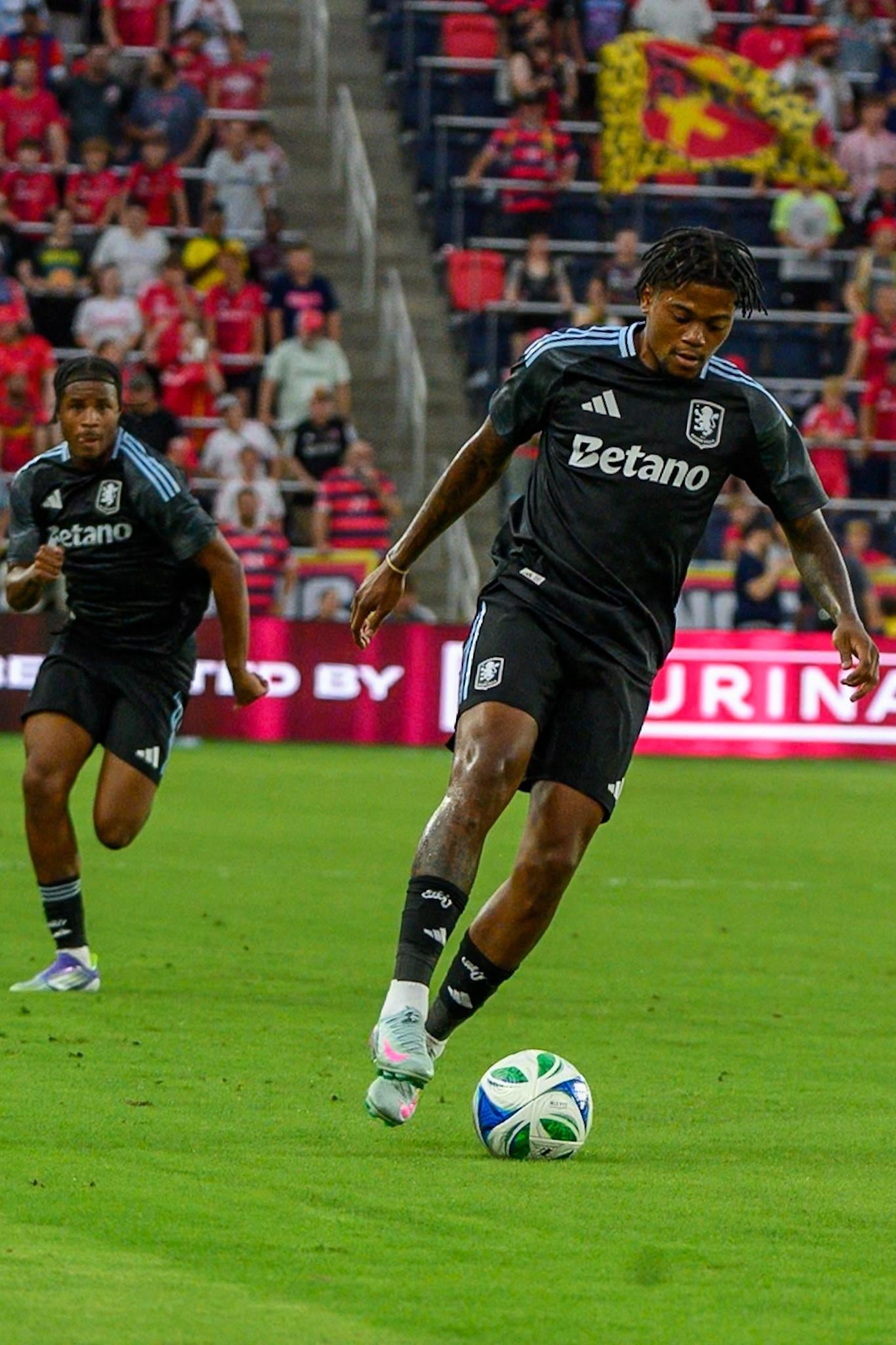
Bailey with Aston Villa in 2025

On 4 August 2021, Bailey signed for Premier League club Aston Villa. On 14 August 2021, he made his Premier League debut as a substitute in a 3–2 loss to Watford. On 18 September, he scored his first goal for Villa in a 3–0 home victory over Everton, in which he also took a corner that led to a Lucas Digne own goal. Bailey's first season with Aston Villa was punctuated with injuries – suffering a hamstring injury in August that ruled him out for a month, a quad injury in the game above against Everton that ruled him out for another month, another thigh injury in December that ruled him out until February, which was followed by an ankle injury in April which prematurely ended his season – ultimately limiting Bailey to only 7 starts.

On 6 November 2022, Bailey scored the first goal under Unai Emery in a 3–1 home victory over Manchester United and was later named player of that month. On 6 December 2023, he scored the only goal in a 1–0 victory over Manchester City, which was his club's first win against the latter since 2013.

Bailey scored against Hibernian in both home (3–0) & away legs (0–5) to help qualify Villa for the UEFA Conference League group stage as well as against Ajax (4–0) in the Round of 16 eventually bowing out to Olympiakos (6–2 on aggregate) in the semi-finals. In that season, Bailey scored 10 goals in the Premier League to help Villa finish fourth & qualify for the UEFA Champions League. In the 24/25 season, Bailey scored his first goal of the season against Leicester at home on the 20th match day.

Bailey became the second Jamaican player to score in the UEFA Champions League, following Wes Morgan, after scoring for Aston Villa against Club Brugge in a 1–3 win on 4 March 2025. He also became the first Jamaican player to assist a goal in the UEFA Champions League, after assisting Marco Asensio during the second leg of the round of 16 tie against Club Brugge on 12 March 2025.

==== Loan to Roma ====
On 20 August 2025, Bailey joined Serie A club Roma on loan for the 2025–26 season, with the option to make the move permanent once the season concludes. On 20 January 2026, amidst an injury crisis at Aston Villa and with Bailey having only had limited game time at Roma, he was recalled to the English club.

Bailey made his return for Aston Villa as a second-half substitute in a 2–0 away victory over Newcastle United on 25 January.

=== Olympiacos ===
On 2 September 2026, Bailey signed for Super League Greece club Olympiacos. On 25 October 2026, Bailey scored his first goal for the club in a 5–0 home victory over Kalamata.

== International career ==
=== Under-23 ===
Bailey played in a friendly match for Jamaica under-23s on 8 March 2015 versus the Cayman Islands under-23 side, where he scored directly from a free kick.

=== Senior ===
In March 2017 it was reported that Bailey would refuse Jamaica call ups until the standards of Jamaican football improved. In September 2017, Bailey told German football magazine Kicker: "They always want me to play for Jamaica, but I've had personal problems with the association since I was eleven or twelve years old". In January 2018, Winfried Schäfer, the former Jamaica national team coach told a German newspaper Bild "I really wanted to make him a national player. I have invited him several times – among others to the Gold Cup in America and to international matches. I also called at Genk. But his step-father blocked everything." Bailey was thought to have accepted a call-up in October 2018, but reneged after demanding that his brother Kyle Butler, who at the time played for the reserves of FC Juniors OÖ in the Austrian 2. Liga, be called up too.

In May 2019, Bailey was named to the Jamaican provisional squad for the 2019 CONCACAF Gold Cup, with Bailey officially announcing that he would accept the call-up and represent the Reggae Boyz. The 21-year-old would earn his first Jamaica international cap on 17 June 2019 against Honduras. Bailey scored his first goal for Jamaica on 6 September 2019 against Antigua and Barbuda, netting the fifth goal in a 6–0 victory in CONCACAF Nations League play.

Bailey was thought to have been eligible to represent England as he has two grandparents who have British citizenship. However, it was discovered he was not eligible to play for England as none of his grandparents were born in England.

On 20 March 2024, Bailey announced via a podcast on YouTube that he will be taking a break from the Jamaican National Team. In his interview Bailey highlighted key issues he faces whenever he comes to represent the Reggae Boyz, such as the unprofessionalism of the Jamaica Football Federation towards the team and himself.

On 12 June 2024, Bailey was listed in Jamaica's Copa America 2024 squad. His agent and step-father subsequently stated on social media that Bailey's position regarding his participation with Jamaica was unchanged and he would not be joining up with the squad for the tournament. In response, the Jamaica Football Federation announced that Bailey had been temporarily suspended from selection for the Jamaican national team.

== Career statistics ==
=== Club ===
As of match played 16 September 2026

Appearances and goals by club, season and competition
| Club | Season | League | | | National cup (Note: Includes Belgian Cup, DFB-Pokal, FA Cup, Coppa Italia) | | League cup (Note: Includes EFL Cup) | | Europe | | Other | | Total | |
| Club | Season | Division | Apps | Goals | Apps | Goals | Apps | Goals | Apps | Goals | Apps | Goals | Apps | Goals |
|---|---|---|---|---|---|---|---|---|---|---|---|---|---|---|
| Genk | 2015–16 | Belgian Pro League | 37 | 6 | 5 | 1 | — | | — | | — | | 42 | 7 |
| Genk | 2016–17 | Belgian Pro League | 19 | 2 | 4 | 0 | — | | 12 (Note: Appearances in UEFA Europa League) | 7 | — | | 35 | 9 |
| Genk | Total | | 56 | 8 | 9 | 1 | — | | 12 | 7 | — | | 77 | 16 |
| Bayer Leverkusen | 2016–17 | Bundesliga | 8 | 0 | — | | — | | 2 (Note: Appearances in UEFA Champions League) | 0 | — | | 10 | 0 |
| Bayer Leverkusen | 2017–18 | Bundesliga | 30 | 9 | 4 | 3 | — | | — | | — | | 34 | 12 |
| Bayer Leverkusen | 2018–19 | Bundesliga | 29 | 5 | 2 | 0 | — | | 8 | 0 | — | | 39 | 5 |
| Bayer Leverkusen | 2019–20 | Bundesliga | 22 | 5 | 3 | 1 | — | | 8 (Note: Three appearances in UEFA Champions League, five appearances and one goal in UEFA Europa League) | 1 | — | | 33 | 7 |
| Bayer Leverkusen | 2020–21 | Bundesliga | 30 | 9 | 2 | 1 | — | | 8 | 5 | — | | 40 | 15 |
| Bayer Leverkusen | Total | | 119 | 28 | 11 | 5 | — | | 26 | 6 | — | | 156 | 39 |
| Aston Villa | 2021–22 | Premier League | 18 | 1 | 0 | 0 | 0 | 0 | — | | — | | 18 | 1 |
| Aston Villa | 2022–23 | Premier League | 33 | 4 | 1 | 0 | 2 | 1 | — | | — | | 36 | 5 |
| Aston Villa | 2023–24 | Premier League | 35 | 10 | 3 | 0 | 1 | 0 | 13 (Note: Appearances in UEFA Europa Conference League) | 4 | — | | 52 | 14 |
| Aston Villa | 2024–25 | Premier League | 24 | 1 | 4 | 0 | 2 | 0 | 8 | 1 | — | | 38 | 2 |
| Aston Villa | 2025–26 | Premier League | 13 | 0 | 1 | 0 | — | | 5 | 1 | — | | 19 | 1 |
| Aston Villa | Total | | 123 | 16 | 9 | 0 | 5 | 1 | 26 | 6 | — | | 163 | 23 |
| Roma (loan) | 2025–26 | Serie A | 7 | 0 | 1 | 0 | — | | 3 | 0 | — | | 11 | 0 |
| Olympiacos | 2026–27 | Greek Super League | 1 | 0 | 0 | 0 | — | | 1 | 0 | — | | 2 | 0 |
| Career total | | | 306 | 52 | 31 | 7 | 5 | 1 | 68 | 19 | 0 | 0 | 409 | 78 |

=== International ===
As of match played 31 March 2026

Appearances and goals by national team and year
| National team | Year | Apps | Goals |
|---|---|---|---|
| Jamaica | 2019 | 6 | 1 |
| Jamaica | 2020 | 2 | 0 |
| Jamaica | 2021 | 4 | 0 |
| Jamaica | 2022 | 6 | 2 |
| Jamaica | 2023 | 12 | 2 |
| Jamaica | 2024 | 2 | 0 |
| Jamaica | 2025 | 7 | 2 |
| Jamaica | 2026 | 2 | 0 |
| Total | | 41 | 7 |

Scores and results list Jamaica's goal tally first, score column indicates score after each Bailey goal

List of international goals scored by Leon Bailey
| No. | Date | Venue | Opponent | Score | Result | Competition |
|---|---|---|---|---|---|---|
| 1 | 6 September 2019 | Montego Bay Sports Complex, Montego Bay, Jamaica | Antigua and Barbuda | 5–0 | 6–0 | 2019–20 CONCACAF Nations League B |
| 2 | 30 March 2022 | Independence Park, Kingston, Jamaica | Honduras | 1–1 | 2–1 | 2022 FIFA World Cup qualification |
| 3 | 14 June 2022 | Independence Park, Kingston, Jamaica | Mexico | 1–0 | 1–1 | 2022–23 CONCACAF Nations League A |
| 4 | 28 June 2023 | CityPark, St. Louis, United States | Trinidad and Tobago | 2–0 | 4–1 | 2023 CONCACAF Gold Cup |
| 5 | 15 October 2023 | Hasely Crawford Stadium, Port of Spain, Trinidad and Tobago | Haiti | 3–1 | 3–2 | 2023–24 CONCACAF Nations League A |
| 6 | 21 March 2025 | Arnos Vale Stadium, Kingstown, Saint Vincent and the Grenadines | Saint Vincent and the Grenadines | 1–1 | 1–1 | 2025 CONCACAF Gold Cup qualification |
| 7 | 20 June 2025 | PayPal Park, San Jose, United States | Guadeloupe | 1–1 | 2–1 | 2025 CONCACAF Gold Cup |

== Honours ==
Aston Villa

- UEFA Europa League: 2025–26

Individual

- Belgian Young Professional Footballer of the Year: 2015–16
- UEFA Golden Boy (award) nomination: 2016
- Europa League goal of the season award: 2016–17
- VDV Newcomer of the Season: 2017–18
- VDV Team of the Season: 2017–18
- Bundesliga Team of the Season: 2017–18
- Bundesliga Goal of the Month: December 2020
- Aston Villa Player of the Month. February 2024
- UEFA Europa Conference League Team of the Season: 2023–24
