= William Dutoit =

French footballer (born 1988)

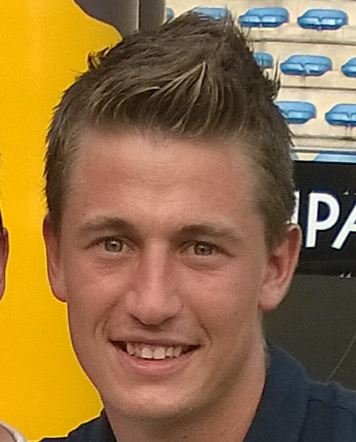

Personal information
- Date of birth: 18 September 1988 (age 38)
- Place of birth: Roncq, France
- Height: 1.82 m (6 ft 0 in)
- Position: Goalkeeper

Senior career*
Years	Team	Apps	(Gls)
2010–2014	Boussu Dour Borinage	73	(0)
2014–2016	Sint-Truiden	73	(1)
2017–2020	Oostende	80	(0)
2020–2024	Deinze	26	(0)
- * Club domestic league appearances and goals as of 16:04, 26 December 2024 (UTC)

William Dutoit (born 18 September 1988) is a French professional footballer who plays as a goalkeeper.

== Career ==
He scored a goal against K.S.C. Lokeren Oost-Vlaanderen in November 2015.

Dutoit left Deinze in December 2024 after the club was declared bankrupt and ceased operations.
