= Soufiane El Banouhi =

Belgian footballer (born 1992)

Personal information
- Full name: Soufiane El Banouhi
- Date of birth: 26 July 1992 (age 34)
- Place of birth: Brussels, Belgium
- Height: 1.78 m (5 ft 10 in)
- Position: Right back

Team information
- Current team: Heist

Senior career*
Years	Team	Apps	(Gls)
2012–2013	RWDM Brussels	36	(0)
2013–2016	WS Brussels	41	(1)
2016–2017	OH Leuven	29	(0)
2017–2020	Union SG	17	(0)
2018–2019	→ Lommel (loan)	25	(0)
2020–2022	Deinze	20	(0)
2022–2025	Lokeren-Temse	70	(1)
2025–	Heist	0	(0)
- * Club domestic league appearances and goals as of 20 April 2025

Soufiane El Banouhi (born 26 July 1992) is a Belgian footballer who is currently playing for Heist in the Belgian Division 2.

El Banouhi started his footballing career with RWDM Brussels where he stayed until 2013 when he moved to WS Brussels. At WS Brussels he played three seasons, during the first two he was a first team regular but the third season saw him only playing one match. El Banouhi thereafter moved to OH Leuven playing in the Belgian First Division B where he again featured in the first team.

== Personal life ==
Born in Belgium, El Banouhi is of Moroccan descent.
