= Jordy Lokando =

Belgian footballer (born 1997)

Personal information
- Full name: Jordy Lokando
- Date of birth: 28 April 1997 (age 29)
- Place of birth: Belgium
- Height: 1.85 m (6 ft 1 in)
- Position: Midfielder

Team information
- Current team: Hamme

Youth career
- OH Leuven

Senior career*
Years	Team	Apps	(Gls)
2015–2018	OH Leuven	2	(0)
2017–2018	→ Heist (loan)	24	(0)
2018	RWDM47	2	
2019	Qormi	11	(0)
2019	Senglea Athletic	0	(0)
2019–2020	Qormi	6	(2)
2020	Diest	0	(0)
2020–2021	Lokeren-Temse	0	(0)
2021–	Hamme	0	(0)
- * Club domestic league appearances and goals as of 22:47, 5 January 2020 (UTC)

Jordy Lokando (born 28 April 1997) is a Belgian footballer who currently plays as a central midfielder for Hamme in the Belgian Division 3.

== Career ==
After joining Maltese club, Qormi, in January 2019, he left the club in August 2019 to join Senglea Athletic. However, he returned to Qormi one month later.
