= Fazlı Kocabaş =

Belgian footballer

Personal information
- Full name: Fazlı Kocabaş
- Date of birth: 1 January 1990 (age 36)
- Place of birth: Brussels, Belgium
- Height: 1.85 m (6 ft 1 in)
- Position: Centre back

Team information
- Current team: Grez-Doiceau

Senior career*
Years	Team	Apps	(Gls)
2008–2009	Standard Liège	0	(0)
2009–2013	Eupen	73	(1)
2013–2014	Kayseri Erciyesspor	15	(0)
2014–2015	Adana Demirspor	11	(0)
2015–2016	Union SG	7	(0)
2016–2017	OH Leuven	27	(1)
2018	Wallonia Walhain	0	(0)
2018–2019	Roeselare	20	(1)
2019–2020	Hesperange	0	(0)
2019–2020	→ Virton (loan)	2	(0)
2020–2023	Grez-Doiceau	0	(0)
2023–2024	Perwez	0	(0)
2024–	Grez-Doiceau	0	(0)

International career
2005	Belgium U15	4	(0)
2005–2006	Belgium U16	20	(2)
2006	Belgium U17	1	(0)
2007–2008	Belgium U18	9	(1)
2008–2009	Belgium U19	11	(1)
2010	Belgium U21	1	(0)
- * Club domestic league appearances and goals as of 17:35, 21 July 2019 (UTC)

Fazlı Kocabaş (born 1 January 1990) is a Belgian footballer who currently plays for Grez-Doiceau in the Belgian Provincial Leagues as a centre back.

== Career ==
After leaving Roeselare, Kocabaş joined R.E. Virton.
