= Florent Stevance =

French footballer (born 1988)

Personal information
- Date of birth: 8 October 1988 (age 38)
- Place of birth: Le Quesnoy, France
- Height: 1.87 m (6 ft 2 in)
- Position: Striker

Team information
- Current team: Olympique St Quentin

Youth career
- 2009–2013: AS Aulnoye

Senior career*
Years	Team	Apps	(Gls)
2013–2014	Boussu Dour Borinage	30	(11)
2014–2015	Seraing United	34	(17)
2015–2018	Charleroi	18	(1)
2017	→ Roeselare (loan)	9	(2)
2017–2018	→ Tubize (loan)	14	(7)
2018	Tours	13	(3)
2019–2021	Seraing	27	(10)
2021–2022	US Maubeuge	25	(15)
2022–2023	Feignies Aulnoye	26	(16)
2023–	Olympique St Quentin	32	(20)
- * Club domestic league appearances and goals as of 7 December 2024

Florent Stevance (born 8 October 1988) is a French professional footballer who plays as a striker for Championnat National 3 club Olympique St Quentin.

== Career ==
In summer 2015, Stevance joined Charleroi on a two-year contract with the option of a further two years.

In January 2019, after six month with Tours, he signed a 2 1/2-year contract with Seraing.
