= Kyle Butler =

Jamaican footballer (born 1998)

Personal information
- Full name: Kyle Brandon Butler
- Date of birth: 16 January 1998 (age 28)
- Place of birth: Kingston, Jamaica
- Position: Midfielder

Youth career
- 2009–2011: Phoenix All Stars Academy
- 2011–2012: Anif Jugend
- 2016–2017: Genk

Senior career*
Years	Team	Apps	(Gls)
2017	Genk	0	(0)
2017	Westerlo	0	(0)
2017–2018	St. Andrews	10	(0)
2018–2019	LASK	0	(0)
2018–2019	→Juniors OÖ (loan)	1	(0)
2019	Austria Lustenau	0	(0)
2024–	Vere United F.C.	0	(0)
- * Club domestic league appearances and goals

Kyle Brandon Butler (born 16 January 1998) is a Jamaican footballer who plays as a midfielder for Vere United F.C. in the Jamaica Premiere League.

== Career ==
As a youth player, Butler traveled with his stepbrother, Jamaican international Leon Bailey, and father, Craig, to Europe, where they played for the youth teams of Austrian club USK Anif as well K.R.C. Genk in Belgium. After that, he signed for K.R.C. Genk but failed to make an appearance despite consistently scoring for the reserves. In 2017, he signed for Maltese club St. Andrews.

In 2018, Butler signed for LASK in Austria, before being sent on loan to Juniors OÖ in the Austrian second division.

In 2020, after failing to make an appearance for Austrian second division side SC Austria Lustenau, he stepped away from football to form Dynasty Records.

In September 2024, Kyle Butler returned to playing football in domestic JPL in Jamaica with Vere United F.C.

== Coaching career ==
In July 2025, Butler was named head coach at Vauxhall High School in the Manning Cup.

== Personal life ==
He is the son of Craig Butler, a recognised sports coach and businessman in Jamaica.
