= Jarno Molenberghs =

Belgian footballer

Personal information
- Date of birth: 11 December 1989 (age 36)
- Place of birth: Geel, Belgium
- Height: 1.77 m (5 ft 10 in)
- Positions: Winger; attacking midfielder

Team information
- Current team: KVV Berg en Dal
- Number: 13

Youth career
- –2001: Hoger-Op Oostham
- 2001–2004: PSV
- 2004–2008: Westerlo

Senior career*
Years	Team	Apps	(Gls)
2008–2017	Westerlo	134	(8)
2011–2012	→ Lommel (loan)	30	(4)
2017	→ Lommel (loan)	12	(0)
2017–2019	Oosterzonen	43	(8)
2019	Patro Eisden	0	(0)
2019–2020	Wijgmaal	17	(1)
2020–	KVV Berg en Dal	42	(1)
- * Club domestic league appearances and goals as of 25 January 2026

Jarno Molenberghs (born 11 December 1989) is a Belgian professional footballer who plays as a winger for KVV Berg en Dal.
