= Tuur Houben =

Belgian footballer

Personal information
- Date of birth: 12 January 1996 (age 30)
- Place of birth: Sint-Truiden, Belgium
- Height: 1.65 m (5 ft 5 in)
- Position: Right winger

Team information
- Current team: Velm

Youth career
- Sint-Truidense V.V.
- Oud-Heverlee Leuven

Senior career*
Years	Team	Apps	(Gls)
2014–2016	Oud-Heverlee Leuven	2	(0)
2017–2019	MVV Maastricht	64	(4)
2019	Telstar	3	(0)
2020	Bocholt		
2020–	Velm		
- * Club domestic league appearances and goals as of 13:47, 8 October 2019 (UTC)

Tuur Houben (born 12 January 1996) is a Belgian football player who plays for Velm in the Belgian Provincial Leagues.

== Club career ==
He made his professional debut in the Belgian Second Division for Oud-Heverlee Leuven on 12 December 2014 in a game against Antwerp.
