= Ram Strauss =

Israeli footballer

Personal information
- Date of birth: 28 April 1992 (age 34)
- Place of birth: Yokneam Moshava, Israel
- Height: 1.93 m (6 ft 4 in)
- Position: Goalkeeper

Youth career
- Maccabi Haifa

Senior career*
Years	Team	Apps	(Gls)
2011–2012	Maccabi Ironi Bat Yam	35	(0)
2012–2013	Maccabi Ahi Nazareth	36	(0)
2013–2014	Hapoel Ramat Gan	20	(0)
2014–2015	Nea Salamina	14	(0)
2015	Hapoel Tel Aviv	1	(0)
2016	Hapoel Ironi Kiryat Shmona	1	(0)
2016	Poli Timișoara	10	(0)
2016	OH Leuven	0	(0)
2017	Hapoel Nazareth Illit	16	(0)
2017–2018	Hapoel Acre	31	(0)
2019–2020	Maccabi Ahi Nazareth	29	(0)

International career
2008	Israel U-16	1	(0)
2008–2009	Israel U17	3	(0)
2009	Israel U18	3	(0)
2010–2011	Israel U19	12	(0)
2011–2013	Israel U21	2	(0)
- * Club domestic league appearances and goals as of 1 June 2019

Ram Strauss (Hebrew: רם שטראוס; born 28 April 1992) is an Israeli former professional association footballer who played as a goalkeeper.

== Early and personal life ==
Strauss was born in moshav Yokneam Moshava, Israel, to a family of Ashkenazi Jewish descent. His brother Sagi Strauss is a former association footballer as well.

Strauss's sister Alvit Strauss married Argentine footballer Roberto Colautti in 2005, and on account of their marriage Colautti became an Israeli citizen in 2007 and played for the Israel national team, as well as four daughters together.

Strauss retired from playing in 2020 after an injury in the back led to two injuries that failed.

In 2024, Strauss competed along with his friend, the tennis player Tal Eros, competed in the Israeli format of Peking Express, "Peking Express - The Dragon Road". The two reached the finale and won the competition.
