= List of Belgian football transfers summer 2015 =

This is a list of Belgian football transfers for the 2015 summer transfer window. Only transfers involving a team from the Belgian Pro League are listed.

The summer transfer window will open on 1 July 2015, although some transfers were announced prior to that date. Players without a club may join one at any time, either during or in between transfer windows. The transfer window ends on 1 September 2015, although a few completed transfers could still be announced a few days later.

== Sorted by date ==
=== January 2015 ===
Date	Name	Moving from	Moving to	Fee	Note
January 2, 2015	(France) Kévin Vandendriessche	(Belgium) Mouscron-Péruwelz	(Belgium) Oostende	Undisclosed	
January 27, 2015	(Belgium) Alexander Corryn	(Belgium) Lokeren	(Belgium) Mechelen	Undisclosed	
January 27, 2015	(Belgium) Cedric Mingiedi	(Belgium) Lokeren	(Belgium) Mechelen	Undisclosed	

=== February 2015 ===
Date	Name	Moving from	Moving to	Fee	Note
February 2, 2015	(Belgium) Wouter Biebauw	(Belgium) Mechelen	(Belgium) Oostende	Undisclosed	
February 6, 2015	(Belgium) Colin Coosemans	(Belgium) Waasland-Beveren	(Belgium) Mechelen	Undisclosed	
February 9, 2015	(France) Florent Stevance	(Belgium) Seraing United	(Belgium) Charleroi	Free	
February 10, 2015	(Belgium) Thomas Matton	(Belgium) Kortrijk	(Belgium) Gent	Free	
February 28, 2015	(Belgium) Birger Maertens	(Belgium) Westerlo	(Belgium) Westhoek	Undisclosed	

=== March 2015 ===
Date	Name	Moving from	Moving to	Fee	Note
March 9, 2015	(Nigeria) Sad'eeq Yusuf	(Nigeria) GBS Academy	(Belgium) Gent	Undisclosed	
March 31, 2015	(Belgium) Jonathan Wilmet	(Belgium) Oostende	(Belgium) Waasland-Beveren	Undisclosed	(Note: Wilmet was already on loan from Oostende to Waasland-Beveren and based on the number of matches played the deal automatically became permanent.)

=== April 2015 ===
Date	Name	Moving from	Moving to	Fee	Note
April 3, 2015	(Belgium) Roman Ferber	(Belgium) Mons	(Belgium) Charleroi	Undisclosed	
April 9, 2015	(Belgium) Yannick Loemba	(Belgium) Mons	(Belgium) Oostende	Undisclosed	
April 21, 2015	(Belgium) Glenn Leemans	(Belgium) Anderlecht	(Belgium) Waasland-Beveren	Undisclosed	
April 21, 2015	(Belgium) Lorenzo Matarrese	(Belgium) Anderlecht	(Belgium) Genk	Undisclosed	
April 23, 2015	(Belgium) Kenny Thompson	(Belgium) OH Leuven	(Belgium) Beerschot Wilrijk	Free	
April 23, 2015	(Belgium) Jore Trompet	(Belgium) Lokeren	(Belgium) Westerlo	Undisclosed	
April 24, 2015	(Belgium) Filip Daems	(Germany) Borussia Mönchengladbach	(Belgium) Westerlo	Free	
April 24, 2015	(Belgium) Birger Verstraete	(Belgium) Club Brugge	(Belgium) Kortrijk	Free	(Note: Verstraete was on loan from Club Brugge to Mouscron-Péruwelz during the 2014-15 season. The loan ended and Verstraete transferred to Kortrijk.)
April 25, 2015	(Belgium) Nicolas Rommens	(Belgium) Westerlo	(Belgium) Dessel Sport	Free	
April 27, 2015	(Belgium) Emre Erciyas	(Belgium) Lierse	(Belgium) Waasland-Beveren	Undisclosed	
April 27, 2015	(Luxembourg) Laurent Jans	(Luxembourg) Fola Esch	(Belgium) Waasland-Beveren	Undisclosed	
April 27, 2015	(Belgium) Matthias Janssens	(Belgium) Gent	(Belgium) Waasland-Beveren	Undisclosed	
April 27, 2015	(Belgium) Davy Schollen	(Belgium) Sint-Truiden	Free agent	Retired	

=== May 2015 ===
Date	Name	Moving from	Moving to	Fee	Note
May 3, 2015	(Belgium) Kevin Geudens	(Belgium) Westerlo	(Belgium) Beerschot Wilrijk	Free	
May 4, 2015	(Belgium) Giuseppe Rossini	(Belgium) Charleroi	(Luxembourg) Progrès Niederkorn	Undisclosed	(Note: Rossini was on loan from Charleroi to OH Leuven during the second half of the 2014-15 season. The loan ended and Rossini transferred to Progrès Niederkorn.)
May 5, 2015	(Belgium) Maximiliano Caufriez	(Belgium) Standard Liège	(Belgium) Waasland-Beveren	Undisclosed	
May 6, 2015	(France) Thibault Moulin	(France) Clermont Foot	(Belgium) Waasland-Beveren	Free	
May 6, 2015	(Belgium) Clément Petit	(Belgium) Mouscron-Péruwelz	(Belgium) Anderlecht	Undisclosed	
May 8, 2015	(France) Steeven Langil	(Belgium) Mouscron-Péruwelz	(Belgium) Waasland-Beveren	Free	
May 10, 2015	(Brazil) Robson	(Belgium) Waasland-Beveren	Free agent	Released	
May 12, 2015	(Belgium) Kristof Van Hout	(India) Delhi Dynamos	(Belgium) Westerlo	Undisclosed	
May 14, 2015	(Belgium) Sébastien Bruzzese	(Belgium) Zulte Waregem	(Belgium) Club Brugge	Undisclosed	
May 14, 2015	(Serbia) Vladan Kujović	(Belgium) Club Brugge	Free agent	Retired	
May 15, 2015	(France) Samuel Gigot	(France) Arles-Avignon	(Belgium) Kortrijk	Undisclosed	
May 16, 2015	(Belgium) Merveille Goblet	(Belgium) Standard Liège	(Belgium) Waasland-Beveren	Free	(Note: Goblet was on loan from Standard to Tubize during the two previous seasons. The loan and his contract with Standard ended, allowing Waasland-Beveren to sign him without paying any transfer fee.)
May 18, 2015	(Belgium) Yahya Boumediene	(Belgium) Seraing United	(Belgium) Mouscron-Péruwelz	Undisclosed	
May 20, 2015	(Greece) Thanasis Papazoglou	(Greece) Olympiacos	(Belgium) Kortrijk	Undisclosed	
May 22, 2015	(Mali) Abdoulay Diaby	(France) Lille	(Belgium) Club Brugge	Undisclosed	
May 26, 2015	(France) Benjamin Boulenger	(France) Lens	(Belgium) Charleroi	Undisclosed	
May 26, 2015	(Belgium) Senne Vits	(Belgium) OH Leuven	(Belgium) Standard Liège	Undisclosed	
May 27, 2015	(France) Yohan Boli	(Belgium) Verviers	(Belgium) Sint-Truiden	Undisclosed	
May 28, 2015	(Belgium) Mathieu Cornet	(Belgium) Virton	(Belgium) Oostende	Undisclosed	
May 28, 2015	(Ivory Coast) Cyriac	(Belgium) Anderlecht	(Belgium) Oostende	Undisclosed	
May 28, 2015	(Belgium) Kristof D'Haene	(Belgium) Cercle Brugge	(Belgium) Kortrijk	Undisclosed	
May 28, 2015	(Democratic Republic of the Congo) Ibrahim Somé	(Belgium) OH Leuven	(Belgium) WS Brussels	Undisclosed	
May 28, 2015	(Belgium) Mickael Tirpan	(Belgium) Seraing United	(Belgium) Mouscron-Péruwelz	Undisclosed	
May 29, 2015	(Portugal) Tiago Ferreira	(Belgium) Zulte Waregem	(Portugal) União da Madeira	Free	
May 29, 2015	(Belgium) Thibaut Rausin	(Belgium) Westerlo	(Belgium) Mouscron-Péruwelz	Undisclosed	
May 29, 2015	(Belgium) Hans Vanaken	(Belgium) Lokeren	(Belgium) Club Brugge	Undisclosed	

=== End of 2014-15 season ===
After the end of the 2014–15 season, several players will return from loan to another club or will not have their contracts extended. These will be listed here when the date is otherwise not specified.

Date	Name	Moving from	Moving to	Fee	Note
End of 2014–15 season	(Belgium) Redouan Aalhoul	(Belgium) Sint-Truiden	Free agent	End of contract	
End of 2014–15 season	(Sweden) Astrit Ajdarević	(Sweden) Helsingborg	(Belgium) Standard Liège	Loan return	
End of 2014–15 season	(Ukraine) Ihor Berezovskyi	(Belgium) Sint-Truiden	(Belgium) Lierse	Loan return	
End of 2014–15 season	(France) Rachid Bourabia	(Belgium) Waasland-Beveren	Free agent	Released	
End of 2014–15 season	(Belgium) Jinty Caenepeel	(Belgium) Cercle Brugge	(Belgium) Gent	Loan return	
End of 2014–15 season	(Croatia) Hrvoje Čale	(Belgium) Waasland-Beveren	Free agent	End of Contract	
End of 2014–15 season	(Chile) Nicolás Castillo	(Germany) 1. FSV Mainz 05	(Belgium) Club Brugge	Loan return	
End of 2014–15 season	(France) Yarouba Cissako	(Belgium) Zulte Waregem	(France) Monaco	Loan return	
End of 2014–15 season	(France) Alexandre Coeff	(Belgium) Mouscron-Péruwelz	(Italy) Udinese	Loan return	
End of 2014–15 season	(Belgium) Michaël Cordier	(Belgium) Westerlo	Free agent	End of Contract	
End of 2014–15 season	(Belgium) Wouter Corstjens	(Belgium) Waasland-Beveren	(Belgium) Gent	Loan return	
End of 2014–15 season	(Belgium) Jimmy De Jonghe	(Belgium) Roeselare	(Belgium) Club Brugge	Loan return	
End of 2014–15 season	(Mali) Alassane Diallo	(Belgium) Westerlo	(Belgium) Standard Liège	Loan return	
End of 2014–15 season	(Denmark) Thomas Enevoldsen	(Belgium) Mechelen	(Denmark) AaB	Undisclosed	(Note: Enevoldsen was already on loan from KV Mechelen to AaB and the transfer was now made permanent.)
End of 2014–15 season	(Nigeria) Imoh Ezekiel	(Belgium) Standard Liège	(Qatar) Al-Arabi	Loan return	
End of 2014–15 season	(Belgium) Zinho Gano	(Belgium) Mouscron-Péruwelz	(Belgium) Club Brugge	Loan return	
End of 2014–15 season	(Belgium) Guillaume Gillet	(France) Bastia	(Belgium) Anderlecht	Loan return	
End of 2014–15 season	(France) Nicolas Godemèche	(Belgium) Waasland-Beveren	Free agent	Released	
End of 2014–15 season	(Burundi) David Habarugira	(Belgium) Sint-Truiden	Free agent	End of contract	
End of 2014–15 season	(Sweden) Jiloan Hamad	(Belgium) Standard Liège	(Germany) TSG Hoffenheim	Loan return	
End of 2014–15 season	(Belgium) Robin Henkens	(Belgium) Waasland-Beveren	Free agent	Released	
End of 2014–15 season	(Belgium) David Hubert	(Belgium) Waasland-Beveren	(Belgium) Gent	Loan return	
End of 2014–15 season	(Ghana) Abdul-Yakuni Iddi	(Belgium) OH Leuven	(Belgium) Mechelen	Loan return	(Note: The contract of Iddi at KV Mechelen ended at the end of the 2014-15 season. As such he became a free player.)
End of 2014–15 season	(France) Julian Jeanvier	(Belgium) Mouscron-Péruwelz	(France) Lille	Loan return	
End of 2014–15 season	(Japan) Eiji Kawashima	(Belgium) Standard Liège	Free agent	End of contract	
End of 2014–15 season	(France) Lynel Kitambala	(Belgium) Charleroi	Free agent	Contract Terminated	
End of 2014–15 season	(Belgium) Tortol Lumanza	(Belgium) Standard Liège	Free agent	Contract Terminated	
End of 2014–15 season	(Germany) Marko Marin	(Belgium) Anderlecht	(England) Chelsea	Loan return	
End of 2014–15 season	(Serbia) Luka Milivojević	(Belgium) Anderlecht	(Greece) Olympiacos	Undisclosed	(Note: Milivojević was already on loan from Anderlecht to Olympiacos during the 2014-15 season. Both parties agreed to make the transfer permanent.)
End of 2014–15 season	(Netherlands) Albian Muzaqi	(Belgium) Cercle Brugge	(Belgium) Genk	Loan return	
End of 2014–15 season	(Nigeria) Kennedy Nwanganga	(Belgium) Genk	Free agent	Released	(Note: Nwanganga was on loan from Genk to Roeselare during the 2014-15 season. The loan ended and Nwanganga was released.)
End of 2014–15 season	(Turkey) Alpaslan Öztürk	(Turkey) Kasımpaşa	(Belgium) Standard Liège	Loan return	
End of 2014–15 season	(Poland) Piotr Parzyszek	(Belgium) Sint-Truiden	(England) Charlton Athletic	Loan return	
End of 2014–15 season	(Belgium) Stef Peeters	(Belgium) Genk	(Netherlands) MVV	Loan made permanent	
End of 2014–15 season	(France) Ronny Rodelin	(Belgium) Mouscron-Péruwelz	(France) Lille	Loan return	
End of 2014–15 season	(Uruguay) Rodrigo Rojo	(Belgium) Sint-Truiden	(Hungary) Újpest	Loan return	
End of 2014–15 season	(Portugal) Rolando	(Belgium) Anderlecht	(Portugal) Porto	Loan return	
End of 2014–15 season	(Costa Rica) John Jairo Ruiz	(Belgium) Oostende	(France) Lille	Loan return	
End of 2014–15 season	(Latvia) Valērijs Šabala	(Czech Republic) Jablonec	(Belgium) Club Brugge	Loan return	
End of 2014–15 season	(Chile) Francisco Silva	(Belgium) Club Brugge	(Spain) Osasuna	Loan return	
End of 2014–15 season	(North Macedonia) Damjan Šiškovski	(Belgium) Gent	(North Macedonia) Rabotnički	Loan return	
End of 2014–15 season	(Belgium) René Sterckx	(Belgium) Waasland-Beveren	Free agent	End of Contract	
End of 2014–15 season	(Senegal) Jamal Thiaré	(Belgium) Charleroi	(France) Avranches	Loan made permanent	(Note: Thiaré was already on loan from Charleroi to Avranches during the 2014-15 season. Both parties agreed to make the transfer permanent.)
End of 2014–15 season	(Australia) James Troisi	(Belgium) Zulte Waregem	(Italy) Juventus	Loan return	
End of 2014–15 season	(Belgium) Jorn Vermeulen	(Belgium) Waasland-Beveren	Free agent	Released	
End of 2014–15 season	(Belgium) Jonathan Vervoort	(Belgium) Charleroi	Free agent	End of Contract	
End of 2014–15 season	(Spain) Fede Vico	(Spain) Córdoba	(Belgium) Anderlecht	Loan return	
End of 2014–15 season	(Croatia) Ante Vukušić	(Belgium) Waasland-Beveren	(Italy) Pescara	Loan return	
End of 2014–15 season	(Belgium) David Wijns	(Belgium) OH Leuven	(Belgium) Heist	Free	(Note: Wijns was already on loan from OH Leuven to Heist during the 2014-15 season. His contract with Leuven ended allowing him to move to Heist on a permanent basis.)
End of 2014–15 season	(Belgium) Ben Yagan	(Belgium) OH Leuven	Free agent	End of contract	

=== June 2015 ===
Date	Name	Moving from	Moving to	Fee	Note
June 1, 2015	(Belgium) Luigi Vaccaro	(Belgium) Seraing United	(Belgium) Mouscron-Péruwelz	Undisclosed	
June 4, 2015	(France) Anthony Knockaert	(England) Leicester City	(Belgium) Standard Liège	Undisclosed	
June 4, 2015	(Belgium) Michaël Lallemand	(Belgium) Eupen	(Belgium) Kortrijk	Undisclosed	
June 4, 2015	(Belgium) Ivan Yagan	(Belgium) Sint-Truiden	(Belgium) Cercle Brugge	Undisclosed	
June 5, 2015	(Belgium) Steve De Ridder	(Denmark) Copenhagen	(Belgium) Zulte Waregem	Loan	
June 5, 2015	(France) Cédric D'Ulivo	(Belgium) Waasland-Beveren	(Belgium) Zulte Waregem	Undisclosed	
June 5, 2015	(Australia) Bernie Ibini	(China) Shanghai SIPG	(Belgium) Club Brugge	Undisclosed	(Note: Ibini-Isei was on loan from Shanghai SIPG to Sydney FC during the 2014-15 season. The loan ended and Ibini-Isei transferred to Club Brugge.)
June 5, 2015	(Belgium) Kenny Steppe	(Belgium) Waasland-Beveren	(Belgium) Zulte Waregem	Undisclosed	
June 6, 2015	(France) Abdou Diallo	(France) Monaco	(Belgium) Zulte Waregem	Loan	
June 7, 2015	(Republic of the Congo) Marvin Baudry	(France) Amiens	(Belgium) Zulte Waregem	Undisclosed	
June 8, 2015	(Belgium) Jordy Croux	(Belgium) Genk	(Netherlands) MVV	Undisclosed	(Note: Croux was already on loan from Genk to MVV during the 2014-15 season and the transfer was now made permanent.)
June 8, 2015	(Belgium) Olivier Myny	(Belgium) Roeselare	(Belgium) Waasland-Beveren	Undisclosed	
June 9, 2015	(France) Karim Belhocine	(Belgium) Gent	Free agent	Retired	(Note: Belhocine retired his career as a footballer but became assistant coach at Kortrijk.)
June 10, 2015	(Belgium) Noë Dussenne	(Belgium) Cercle Brugge	(Belgium) Mouscron-Péruwelz	Undisclosed	
June 11, 2015	(Belgium) Selim Amallah	(Belgium) Mons	(Belgium) Mouscron-Péruwelz	Undisclosed	
June 11, 2015	(Israel) Mohammad Ghadir	(Israel) Maccabi Haifa	(Belgium) Lokeren	Undisclosed	(Note: Ghadir was on loan from Maccabi Haifa to Bnei Sakhnin during the last two seasons. The loan ended and Ghadir moved to Lokeren.)
June 12, 2015	(Trinidad and Tobago) Khaleem Hyland	(Belgium) Genk	(Belgium) Westerlo	Undisclosed	
June 13, 2015	(Morocco) Mehdi Carcela	(Belgium) Standard Liège	(Portugal) Benfica	Undisclosed	
June 15, 2015	(Germany) Christian Dorda	(Belgium) Westerlo	(Germany) Hansa Rostock	Undisclosed	
June 15, 2015	(Belgium) Zinho Gano	(Belgium) Club Brugge	(Belgium) Waasland-Beveren	Undisclosed	
June 15, 2015	(Belgium) Yannis Mbombo	(Belgium) Standard Liège	(Belgium) Sint-Truiden	Loan	(Note: Mbombo was on loan from Standard Liège to Auxerre during the 2014-15 season. The loan ended and Mbombo was loaned to Sint-Truiden.)
June 15, 2015	(Denmark) Lasse Nielsen	(Netherlands) NEC	(Belgium) Gent	Undisclosed	(Note: Nielsen was already on loan from NEC to Gent during the 2014-15 season. Both clubs agreed on a transfer sum and made the transfer permanent.)
June 15, 2015	(French Guiana) Sloan Privat	(Belgium) Gent	(France) Guingamp	Loan	(Note: Privat was on loan from Gent to Caen during the 2014-15 season. The loan ended and Privat was immediately loaned to Guingamp.)
June 16, 2015	(Belgium) Dorian Dessoleil	(Belgium) Virton	(Belgium) Charleroi	Undisclosed	
June 16, 2015	(Portugal) Rúben Fernandes	(Portugal) Estoril	(Belgium) Sint-Truiden	Undisclosed	
June 16, 2015	(Senegal) Mbaye Leye	(Belgium) Lokeren	(Belgium) Zulte Waregem	Undisclosed	
June 16, 2015	(Belgium) Aristote Nkaka	(Belgium) Club Brugge U19	(Belgium) Mouscron-Péruwelz	Undisclosed	
June 16, 2015	(Belgium) Jordan Remacle	(Belgium) Lokeren	(Belgium) OH Leuven	Undisclosed	
June 17, 2015	(Belgium) Siebe Blondelle	(Belgium) Waasland-Beveren	(Belgium) Eupen	Undisclosed	
June 17, 2015	(Angola) Jonathan Buatu Mananga	(England) Fulham	(Belgium) Waasland-Beveren	Free	
June 17, 2015	(Belgium) Nill De Pauw	(Belgium) Lokeren	(France) Guingamp	Undisclosed	
June 17, 2015	(Belgium) Christophe Lepoint	(England) Charlton Athletic	(Belgium) Zulte Waregem	Undisclosed	
June 17, 2015	(Belgium) François Marquet	(Belgium) Standard Liège	(Belgium) Mouscron-Péruwelz	Loan	(Note: Marquet was on loan from Standard Liège to PSV during the second half of the 2014-15 season. The loan ended and Marquet was immediately loaned to Mouscron-Péruwelz.)
June 17, 2015	(Belgium) Pierre-Yves Ngawa	(Belgium) Lierse	(Belgium) OH Leuven	Undisclosed	
June 17, 2015	(Curaçao) Romero Regales	(Belgium) Lommel United	(Belgium) OH Leuven	Undisclosed	
June 18, 2015	(Belgium) Sven Dhoest	(Belgium) Club Brugge	(Belgium) Wetteren	Undisclosed	(Note: Dhoest was on loan from Club Brugge to Mouscron-Péruwelz during the 2014-15 season. The loan ended and Dhoest signed for Wetteren.)
June 18, 2015	(Belgium) Joey Dujardin	(Belgium) Zulte Waregem	(Belgium) Lokeren	Undisclosed	
June 18, 2015	(Senegal) Joher Khadim Rassoul	(Belgium) Anderlecht	(Belgium) Lokeren	Undisclosed	
June 18, 2015	(Serbia) Marko Mirić	(Croatia) Slaven Belupo	(Belgium) Lokeren	Undisclosed	
June 18, 2015	(Croatia) Ivan Santini	(Belgium) Kortrijk	(Belgium) Standard Liège	Undisclosed	
June 19, 2015	(Belgium) Maxime Biset	(Belgium) Mechelen	(Belgium) Antwerp	Undisclosed	
June 19, 2015	(Belgium) Stephen Buyl	(Belgium) Cercle Brugge	(Belgium) Zulte Waregem	Undisclosed	
June 19, 2015	(Belgium) Steve Colpaert	(Belgium) Zulte Waregem	(Belgium) Antwerp	Undisclosed	
June 19, 2015	(Belgium) Dion Cools	(Belgium) OH Leuven	(Belgium) Club Brugge	Undisclosed	
June 19, 2015	(Belgium) Dimitri Daeseleire	(Belgium) Sint-Truiden	(Belgium) Antwerp	Undisclosed	
June 19, 2015	(Belgium) Joeri Dequevy	(Belgium) Sint-Truiden	(Belgium) Antwerp	Undisclosed	
June 19, 2015	(Democratic Republic of the Congo) Mulopo Kudimbana	(Belgium) Anderlecht	(Belgium) Antwerp	Undisclosed	
June 20, 2015	(Belgium) Jan Mertens	(Belgium) Mechelen	(Belgium) Lommel United	Undisclosed	
June 21, 2015	(Mali) Kalifa Coulibaly	(Belgium) Charleroi	(Belgium) Gent	Undisclosed	
June 21, 2015	(Belgium) David Pollet	(Belgium) Gent	(Belgium) Charleroi	Undisclosed	
June 22, 2015	(Albania) Mërgim Vojvoda	(Belgium) Standard Liège	(Germany) Carl Zeiss Jena	Loan	(Note: Vojvoda was on loan from Standard Liège to Sint-Truiden during the 2014-15 season. The loan ended and Vojovoda was loaned to Carl Zeiss Jena.)
June 23, 2015	(Serbia) Ivan Obradović	(Belgium) Mechelen	(Belgium) Anderlecht	Undisclosed	
June 23, 2015	(Serbia) Nikola Petković	(Australia) Sydney FC	(Belgium) Westerlo	Undisclosed	
June 23, 2015	(Belgium) Muhamed Tahiri	(Belgium) Oostende	(Belgium) Ingelmunster	Loan	
June 23, 2015	(Belgium) Mehdi Tarfi	(Belgium) Anderlecht	(Belgium) Antwerp	Undisclosed	
June 23, 2015	(Belgium) Yoshi Verbrugge	(Belgium) Oostende	(Belgium) Ingelmunster	Loan	
June 24, 2015	(Belgium) Théo Defourny	(Belgium) Virton	(Belgium) Mouscron-Péruwelz	Undisclosed	
June 25, 2015	(Belgium) Igor de Camargo	(Belgium) Standard Liège	(Belgium) Genk	Undisclosed	
June 25, 2015	(Belgium) Dario van den Buijs	(Belgium) Club Brugge	(Netherlands) FC Eindhoven	Undisclosed	
June 25, 2015	(Belgium) Jari Vandeputte	(Belgium) Gent	(Netherlands) FC Eindhoven	Loan	(Note: Vandeputte was on loan from Gent to Roeselare during the 2014-15 season. The loan ended and Vandeputte was loaned to FC Eindhoven.)
June 25, 2015	(Greece) Sokratis Dioudis	(Belgium) Club Brugge	(Greece) Panionios	Loan	
June 26, 2015	(France) Fabien Antunes	(Belgium) Virton	(Belgium) Oostende	Undisclosed	
June 26, 2015	(France) Benjamin Delacourt	(Belgium) Mouscron-Péruwelz	(Belgium) Deinze	Undisclosed	
June 26, 2015	(Slovakia) Branislav Niňaj	(Slovakia) Slovan Bratislava	(Belgium) Lokeren	Undisclosed	
June 26, 2015	(France) Elohim Rolland	(France) Boulogne	(Belgium) Kortrijk	Undisclosed	
June 26, 2015	(Poland) Filip Starzyński	(Poland) Ruch Chorzów	(Belgium) Lokeren	Undisclosed	
June 27, 2015	(France) Jean-Luc Dompé	(France) Valenciennes	(Belgium) Sint-Truiden	Undisclosed	
June 27, 2015	(Belgium) Kylian Hazard	(Belgium) Zulte Waregem	(Hungary) Újpest	Undisclosed	
June 28, 2015	(Cameroon) Lewis Enoh	(Portugal) Sporting CP	(Belgium) Lokeren	Undisclosed	
June 28, 2015	(France) Cédric Fauré	(Belgium) Charleroi	(Belgium) Union SG	Free	
June 29, 2015	(Belgium) Benjamin De Ceulaer	(Belgium) Genk	(Belgium) Westerlo	Free	
June 29, 2015	(Czech Republic) David Rozehnal	(France) Lille	(Belgium) Oostende	Undisclosed	
June 30, 2015	(Belgium) Yoni Buyens	(Belgium) Standard Liège	(Belgium) Genk	Undisclosed	(Note: Buyens was on loan from Standard Liège to Charlton Athletic during the 2014-15 season. The loan ended and Buyens was sold to Genk.)
June 30, 2015	(Cameroon) Aboubakar Oumarou	(Belgium) Waasland-Beveren	(Serbia) Partizan	Free	
June 30, 2015	(Poland) Waldemar Sobota	(Belgium) Club Brugge	(Germany) St. Pauli	Loan	(Note: Sobota was already on loan from Club Brugge to St. Pauli during the second half of the 2014-15 season. The loan was extended with a full season.)

=== July 2015 ===
Date	Name	Moving from	Moving to	Fee	Note
July 2, 2015	(Spain) Alfonso Artabe	(Spain) Atlético Baleares	(Belgium) Sint-Truiden	Undisclosed	
July 2, 2015	(Belgium) Simon Bracke	(Belgium) OH Leuven	(Belgium) ASV Geel	Loan	
July 2, 2015	(France) Gary Coulibaly	(France) Ajaccio	(Belgium) Waasland-Beveren	Free	
July 2, 2015	(Belgium) Laurent Henkinet	(Belgium) Kortrijk	(Belgium) Waasland-Beveren	Undisclosed	
July 2, 2015	(Greece) Konstantinos Rougalas	(Greece) Iraklis	(Belgium) OH Leuven	Undisclosed	
July 2, 2015	(Serbia) Slobodan Urošević	(Serbia) Napredak Kruševac	(Belgium) OH Leuven	Loan	
July 3, 2015	(Colombia) Darwin Andrade	(Hungary) Újpest	(Belgium) Standard Liège	Undisclosed	(Note: Andrade was already on loan from Újpest to Standard Liège during the 2014-15 season, the deal was now made permanent.)
July 3, 2015	(Belgium) Christophe Bertjens	(Belgium) Sint-Truiden	(Belgium) Lommel United	Free	(Note: Bertjens was on loan from Sint-Truiden to Bocholt during the 2014-15 season. The loan ended and Bertjens was released to Lommel United.)
July 3, 2015	(Montenegro) Vladimir Volkov	(Serbia) Partizan Belgrade	(Belgium) Mechelen	Free	
July 4, 2015	(Netherlands) Danny Verbeek	(Belgium) Standard Liège	(Netherlands) NAC Breda	Undisclosed	(Note: Verbeek was on loan from Standard Liège to Utrecht during the 2014-15 season. The loan ended and Verbeek was released to Nac Breda.)
July 5, 2015	(Morocco) Ahmed El Messaoudi	(Belgium) Lierse	(Belgium) Standard Liège	Loan	
July 5, 2015	(Belgium) Faysel Kasmi	(Belgium) Lierse	(Belgium) Standard Liège	Loan	
July 5, 2015	(Democratic Republic of the Congo) Joël Sami	(France) Nancy	(Belgium) Zulte Waregem	Undisclosed	
July 6, 2015	(Belgium) Jason Adesanya	(Belgium) Mechelen	(Belgium) Antwerp	Loan	(Note: Adesanya was on loan from Mechelen to Lommel United during the 2014-15 season. The loan ended and Adesanya was loaned to Antwerp.)
July 6, 2015	(Nigeria) Joseph Akpala	(Turkey) Karabükspor	(Belgium) Oostende	Undisclosed	
July 6, 2015	(Albania) Enis Gavazaj	(Belgium) Gent	(Belgium) Roeselare	Loan	
July 6, 2015	(Belgium) Rik Impens	(Belgium) Gent	(Belgium) Roeselare	Loan	
July 6, 2015	(France) Aboubakar Kamara	(France) Monaco	(Belgium) Kortrijk	Undisclosed	
July 6, 2015	(Belgium) Jelle Vossen	(Belgium) Genk	(England) Burnley	Undisclosed	(Note: Vossen was on loan from Genk to Middlesbrough during the 2014-15 season. The loan ended and Genk was sold to Burnley.)
July 7, 2015	(Montenegro) Mijuško Bojović	(Belgium) Waasland-Beveren	(Cyprus) Enosis Neon Paralimni	Undisclosed	
July 7, 2015	(France) Fabien Boyer	(France) Angers	(Belgium) Kortrijk	Undisclosed	
July 7, 2015	(Belgium) Yves De Winter	(Netherlands) AZ	(Belgium) Sint-Truiden	Free	
July 7, 2015	(Israel) Ofir Martziano	(Israel) Ashdod	(Belgium) Mouscron-Péruwelz	Loan	
July 7, 2015	(Belgium) Leandro Trossard	(Belgium) Genk	(Belgium) OH Leuven	Loan	(Note: Trossard was on loan from Genk to Lommel United during the 2014-15 season. The loan ended and Trossard was now loaned to OH Leuven.)
July 8, 2015	(Israel) Hatem Abd Elhamed	(Israel) Ashdod	(Belgium) Gent	Undisclosed	(Note: Abd Elhamed was on loan from Ashdod to Dinamo București during the second half of the 2014-15 season. The loan ended and Abd Elhamed transferred to Gent.)
July 8, 2015	(Belgium) Logan Bailly	(Belgium) OH Leuven	(Scotland) Celtic	Undisclosed	
July 8, 2015	(Belgium) Kenneth Houdret	(Belgium) Charleroi	(Belgium) OH Leuven	Loan	
July 8, 2015	(Belgium) Matthias Trenson	(Belgium) OH Leuven	(Belgium) Hasselt	Free	
July 9, 2015	(Sweden) Erik Johansson	(Sweden) Malmö	(Belgium) Gent	Undisclosed	
July 9, 2015	(Croatia) Mario Tičinović	(Denmark) Nordsjælland	(Belgium) Lokeren	Free	
July 10, 2015	(Belgium) David Destorme	(Belgium) Mechelen	(Belgium) Waasland-Beveren	Free	(Note: Destorme was already on loan from Mechelen to Waasland-Beveren during the 2014-15 season. Both the loan and his contract with Mechelen ended, allowing him to move to Waasland-Beveren permanently.)
July 13, 2015	(Gabon) Frédéric Bulot	(Belgium) Standard Liège	(France) Reims	Undisclosed	(Note: Bulot was on loan from Standard Liège to Charlton Athletic during the 2014-15 season. The loan ended and Bulot was sold to Reims.)
July 13, 2015	(Belgium) Jean-François Gillet	(Italy) Catania	(Belgium) Mechelen	Loan	
July 13, 2015	(Democratic Republic of the Congo) Paul-Jose M'Poku	(Belgium) Standard Liège	(Italy) Chievo Verona	Loan	(Note: Mpoku was on loan from Standard Liège to Cagliari during the second half of the 2014-15 season. The loan ended and Mpoku was loaned to Chievo Verona.)
July 14, 2015	(Ghana) David Addy	(Belgium) Waasland-Beveren	Free agent	Released	
July 14, 2015	(Ivory Coast) Victorien Angban	(England) Chelsea	(Belgium) Sint-Truiden	Loan	
July 14, 2015	(Belgium) Brecht Capon	(Belgium) Kortrijk	(Belgium) Oostende	Undisclosed	
July 14, 2015	(Sweden) Erdin Demir	(Norway) Brann Bergen	(Belgium) Waasland-Beveren	Undisclosed	
July 14, 2015	(Portugal) Frédéric Maciel	(Portugal) Porto	(Belgium) Mouscron-Péruwelz	Undisclosed	
July 14, 2015	(Spain) Jonathan Viera	(Belgium) Standard Liège	(Spain) Las Palmas	€900k	(Note: Viera was already on loan from Standard Liège to Las Palmas during the second half of the 2014-15 season and the transfer was now made permanent.)
July 15, 2015	(Ivory Coast) Mamadou Bagayoko	(Slovakia) Slovan Bratislava	(Belgium) Sint-Truiden	Undisclosed	
July 15, 2015	(Slovenia) Emir Dautović	(Serbia) OFK Belgrade	(Belgium) Mouscron-Péruwelz	Undisclosed	
July 15, 2015	(Serbia) Marko Pavlovski	(Portugal) Porto	(Belgium) Mouscron-Péruwelz	Undisclosed	
July 15, 2015	(Switzerland) Karim Rossi	(Belgium) Zulte Waregem	(Italy) Spezia	Free	
July 15, 2015	(Belgium) Kevin Vandenbergh	(Belgium) Westerlo	(Belgium) Dessel Sport	Undisclosed	
July 16, 2015	(Ghana) Samuel Asamoah	(Belgium) Eupen	(Belgium) OH Leuven	Loan	
July 16, 2015	(Bosnia and Herzegovina) Enes Šipović	(Belgium) Westerlo	(Morocco) Ittihad Tanger	Undisclosed	
July 17, 2015	(Guinea) Mohamed Yattara	(France) Lyon	(Belgium) Standard Liège	Undisclosed	
July 18, 2015	(Belgium) Gilles Lentz	(Belgium) Roeselare	(Belgium) Kortrijk	Undisclosed	
July 20, 2015	(Ukraine) Serhiy Bolbat	(Ukraine) Shakhtar Donetsk	(Belgium) Lokeren	Loan	
July 20, 2015	(Haiti) Jeff Louis	(Belgium) Standard Liège	(France) Caen	Undisclosed	
July 20, 2015	(Japan) Yuji Ono	(Belgium) Standard Liège	(Belgium) Sint-Truiden	Undisclosed	
July 20, 2015	(Iceland) Ólafur Ingi Skúlason	(Belgium) Zulte Waregem	(Turkey) Gençlerbirliği	Undisclosed	
July 21, 2015	(Serbia) Aleksandar Mitrović	(Belgium) Anderlecht	(England) Newcastle United	€17-18M	
July 21, 2015	(Australia) Mathew Ryan	(Belgium) Club Brugge	(Spain) Valencia	€7M	
July 22, 2015	(Nigeria) Imoh Ezekiel	(Qatar) Al-Arabi	(Belgium) Anderlecht	Loan	
July 22, 2015	(France) Rudy Riou	(France) Lens	(Belgium) OH Leuven	Undisclosed	
July 23, 2015	(Turkey) Sinan Bolat	(Portugal) Porto	(Belgium) Club Brugge	Loan	
July 23, 2015	(France) Jean-Charles Castelletto	(France) Auxerre	(Belgium) Club Brugge	Undisclosed	
July 23, 2015	(Belgium) Mohamed Messoudi	(Belgium) Zulte Waregem	(Morocco) Raja Casablanca	Free	
July 23, 2015	(Ghana) Benjamin Tetteh	(Ghana) Dreams	(Belgium) Standard Liège	Undisclosed	
July 24, 2015	(Serbia) Nikola Aksentijević	(Serbia) OFK Belgrade	(Belgium) Mouscron-Péruwelz	Undisclosed	
July 24, 2015	(Serbia) Nikola Gulan	(Spain) Mallorca	(Belgium) Mouscron-Péruwelz	Undisclosed	
July 25, 2015	(Zambia) Rodgers Kola	(Belgium) Gent	(Greece) Veria	Loan	(Note: Kola was on loan from Gent to Ironi Kiryat Shmona during the 2014-15 season. The loan ended and Kola was loaned to Veria.)
July 25, 2015	(Senegal) Mame Baba Thiam	(Italy) Juventus	(Belgium) Zulte Waregem	Loan	
July 26, 2015	(Tunisia) Fabien Camus	(Belgium) Genk	(France) Troyes	Free	(Note: Camus was on loan from Genk to Evian during the 2014-15 season. The loan ended and Camus was released to Troyes.)
July 26, 2015	(Democratic Republic of the Congo) Chancel Mbemba	(Belgium) Anderlecht	(England) Newcastle United	Undisclosed	
July 26, 2015	(Netherlands) Ronnie Stam	(Belgium) Standard Liège	(Netherlands) NAC Breda	Free	
July 27, 2015	(France) Steeven Joseph-Monrose	(Belgium) Genk	(France) Brest	Free	
July 28, 2015	(Italy) Stefano Okaka	(Italy) Sampdoria	(Belgium) Anderlecht	€3M	
July 28, 2015	(Ghana) Kevin Osei	(Belgium) Waasland-Beveren	(England) Carlisle United	Free	
July 28, 2015	(Nigeria) William Troost-Ekong	(Netherlands) Groningen	(Belgium) Gent	Undisclosed	
July 28, 2015	(Nigeria) William Troost-Ekong	(Belgium) Gent	(Norway) Haugesund	Loan	
July 29, 2015	(Nigeria) Sad'eeq Yusuf	(Belgium) Gent	(Norway) Haugesund	Loan	
July 30, 2015	(France) Teddy Chevalier	(Belgium) Kortrijk	(Turkey) Çaykur Rizespor	Undisclosed	
July 30, 2015	(France) Jérémy Dumesnil	(Belgium) Oostende	(Belgium) Coxyde	Undisclosed	(Note: Dumesnil was on loan from Oostende to Mouscron-Péruwelz during the second half of the 2014-15 season. The loan ended and Dumesnil was released to Coxyde.)
July 30, 2015	(Belgium) Nathan Kabasele	(Belgium) Anderlecht	(Netherlands) De Graafschap	Loan	
July 30, 2015	(Democratic Republic of the Congo) Hervé Kage	(Belgium) Genk	(Belgium) Kortrijk	Undisclosed	
July 30, 2015	(Finland) Valtteri Moren	(Finland) HJK Helsinki	(Belgium) Waasland-Beveren	Undisclosed	
July 30, 2015	(Turkey) Alpaslan Öztürk	(Belgium) Standard Liège	(Turkey) Eskişehirspor	Loan	
July 30, 2015	(Portugal) Rochinha	(Portugal) Benfica	(Belgium) Standard Liège	Undisclosed	
July 30, 2015	(Nigeria) Godwin Saviour	(Nigeria) El-Kadme Academy	(Belgium) Oostende	Loan	
July 31, 2015	(Turkey) Enes Ünal	(England) Manchester City	(Belgium) Genk	Loan	

=== August 2015 ===
Date	Name	Moving from	Moving to	Fee	Note
August 1, 2015	(Belgium) Thomas Kaminski	(Belgium) Anderlecht	(Denmark) Copenhagen	Loan	(Note: Kaminski was on loan from Anderlecht to Anorthosis Famagusta during the 2014-15 season. The loan ended and Kaminski was now loaned to Copenhagen.)
August 3, 2015	(Serbia) Sergej Milinković-Savić	(Belgium) Genk	(Italy) Lazio	Undisclosed	
August 3, 2015	(Colombia) Joao Rodríguez	(England) Chelsea	(Belgium) Sint-Truiden	Loan	
August 4, 2015	(Belgium) Jinty Caenepeel	(Belgium) Gent	(Netherlands) FC Eindhoven	Undisclosed	
August 4, 2015	(Belgium) Tom Van Imschoot	(Belgium) Oostende	(Netherlands) FC Eindhoven	Free	
August 5, 2015	(Turkey) Anıl Koç	(Belgium) Standard Liège	(Netherlands) FC Eindhoven	Undisclosed	
August 5, 2015	(Serbia) Marko Šćepović	(Greece) Olympiacos	(Belgium) Mouscron-Péruwelz	Loan	
August 6, 2015	(Norway) Mushaga Bakenga	(Belgium) Club Brugge	(Norway) Molde	Loan	(Note: Bakenga was already on loan from Club Brugge to Molde during the second half of the 2014-15 season. The loan was extended with one season.)
August 6, 2015	(Egypt) Trezeguet	(Egypt) Al Ahly	(Belgium) Anderlecht	Loan	
August 6, 2015	(Belgium) Yannick Reuten	(Belgium) Club Brugge	(Belgium) Deinze	Loan	
August 7, 2015	(Senegal) Kara Mbodj	(Belgium) Genk	(Belgium) Anderlecht	Undisclosed	
August 10, 2015	(Chile) Cristián Cuevas	(England) Chelsea	(Belgium) Sint-Truiden	Loan	
August 10, 2015	(Belgium) Sébastien Dewaest	(Belgium) Charleroi	(Belgium) Genk	Undisclosed	
August 10, 2015	(Mali) Falaye Sacko	(Hungary) Újpest	(Belgium) Sint-Truiden	Loan	
August 10, 2015	(Bosnia and Herzegovina) Nermin Zolotić	(Belgium) Gent	(Croatia) Istra	Loan	
August 11, 2015	(Sweden) Astrit Ajdarević	(Belgium) Standard Liège	(Sweden) Örebro	Free	
August 11, 2015	(Belgium) Wouter Corstjens	(Belgium) Gent	(Greece) Panetolikos	Undisclosed	
August 12, 2015	(Jamaica) Leon Bailey	(Slovakia) Trenčín	(Belgium) Genk	Free transfer	
August 13, 2015	(Croatia) Fran Brodić	(Belgium) Club Brugge	(Belgium) Antwerp	Loan	
August 13, 2015	(Belgium) Michaël Cordier	Free agent	(Belgium) Club Brugge	NA	
August 13, 2015	(Belgium) Tom De Sutter	(Belgium) Club Brugge	(Turkey) Bursaspor	Undisclosed	
August 14, 2015	(France) Maxime Colin	(Belgium) Anderlecht	(England) Brentford	Undisclosed	
August 17, 2015	(Serbia) Stefan Mitrović	(Germany) SC Freiburg	(Belgium) Gent	Loan	
August 18, 2015	(Belgium) Christian Brüls	(France) Rennes	(Belgium) Standard Liège	Loan	
August 19, 2015	(Belgium) Niels Coussement	(Belgium) Oostende	(Belgium) Roeselare	Loan	
August 19, 2015	(Greece) Panagiotis Kynigopoulos	(Greece) Aiginiakos	(Belgium) Sint-Truiden	Undisclosed	
August 19, 2015	(Norway) Vajebah Sakor	(Italy) Juventus	(Belgium) Westerlo	Loan	(Note: Sakor was loaned to Westerlo for two seasons.)
August 20, 2015	(Democratic Republic of the Congo) Olivier Lusamba	(Belgium) OH Leuven	(Belgium) Aalst	Free	
August 20, 2015	(Ukraine) Oleksandr Volovyk	(Ukraine) Shakhtar Donetsk	(Belgium) OH Leuven	Loan	
August 21, 2015	(Belgium) Jimmy De Jonghe	(Belgium) Club Brugge	(Belgium) Beerschot Wilrijk	Loan	
August 21, 2015	(Belgium) Pieterjan Monteyne	(Belgium) Mouscron-Péruwelz	(Belgium) OH Leuven	Undisclosed	
August 21, 2015	(Netherlands) Stevy Okitokandjo	(Belgium) Mechelen	(Belgium) Patro Eisden Maasmechelen	Loan	
August 21, 2015	(Croatia) Ante Puljić	(Belgium) Gent	(Romania) Dinamo Bucharest	Undisclosed	
August 21, 2015	(Belgium) Tom Rosenthal	(Belgium) Zulte Waregem	(England) Queens Park Rangers	Undisclosed	
August 23, 2015	(Belgium) Jentl Gaethofs	(Belgium) Genk	(Belgium) Lommel United	Loan Extended	(Note: Gaethofs was already on loan from Genk to Lommel United during the 2014-15 season. The loan was extended with one season.)
August 24, 2015	(Greece) Michalis Sifakis	(Greece) Levadiakos	(Belgium) Kortrijk	Undisclosed	
August 25, 2015	(Trinidad and Tobago) Sheldon Bateau	(Belgium) Mechelen	(Russia) Krylia Sovetov Samara	Loan	
August 25, 2015	(Algeria) Mourad Satli	(Romania) Petrolul Ploiești	(Belgium) Mechelen	Free	
August 25, 2015	(Latvia) Eduards Višņakovs	(Poland) Ruch Chorzów	(Belgium) Westerlo	Undisclosed	
August 25, 2015	(North Macedonia) Gjoko Zajkov	(France) Rennes	(Belgium) Charleroi	Loan	
August 26, 2015	(Morocco) Younes Bnou Marzouk	(Italy) Juventus	(Belgium) Westerlo	Loan	
August 27, 2015	(Democratic Republic of the Congo) Neeskens Kebano	(Belgium) Charleroi	(Belgium) Genk	Undisclosed	
August 28, 2015	(Belgium) Carl Hoefkens	(Belgium) Oostende	(Gibraltar) Manchester 62	Free	
August 29, 2015	(Belgium) Yohan Brouckaert	(Belgium) OH Leuven	(Belgium) Roeselare	Loan	
August 29, 2015	(Belgium) Dylan De Belder	(Belgium) Waasland-Beveren	(Belgium) Lommel United	Loan	
August 29, 2015	(South Africa) Anele Ngcongca	(Belgium) Genk	(France) Troyes	Loan	(Note: The loan deal of Anele to Troyes contains a clause which states that in case Troyes manages to avoid relegation, the transfer will become permanent.)
August 29, 2015	(Belgium) Lucas Pirard	(Belgium) Standard Liège	(Belgium) Lommel United	Loan	
August 30, 2015	(Serbia) Aleksandar Čavrić	(Belgium) Genk	(Denmark) Aarhus	Loan	
August 30, 2015	(Croatia) Tomislav Kiš	(Croatia) Hajduk Split	(Belgium) Kortrijk	Undisclosed	
August 30, 2015	(Belgium) Nikola Storm	(Belgium) Club Brugge	(Belgium) Zulte Waregem	Loan	
August 30, 2015	(Latvia) Valērijs Šabala	(Belgium) Club Brugge	(Poland) Miedź Legnica	Loan	
August 31, 2015	(France) Adrian Adam	(Belgium) Charleroi	(Belgium) Patro Eisden Maasmechelen	Loan	
August 31, 2015	(Nigeria) Mikel Agu	(Portugal) Porto	(Belgium) Club Brugge	Loan	
August 31, 2015	(Senegal) Amara Baby	(France) Auxerre	(Belgium) Charleroi	Free	
August 31, 2015	(Belgium) Samuel Bastien	(Belgium) Anderlecht	(Italy) Avellino	Loan	
August 31, 2015	(Belgium) Frank Boeckx	(Belgium) Antwerp	(Belgium) Anderlecht	Free	
August 31, 2015	(Chile) Nicolás Castillo	(Belgium) Club Brugge	(Italy) Frosinone	Loan	
August 31, 2015	(Ivory Coast) Sekou Cissé	(Belgium) Genk	(France) Sochaux	Loan	
August 31, 2015	(Senegal) Mohamed Daf	(Belgium) Charleroi	(Belgium) WS Brussels	Loan	
August 31, 2015	(Turkey) Muhammed Demirci	(Turkey) Beşiktaş	(Belgium) Mouscron-Péruwelz	Free	
August 31, 2015	(Togo) Mathieu Dossevi	(Greece) Olympiacos	(Belgium) Standard Liège	Loan	
August 31, 2015	(Belgium) Renaud Emond	(Belgium) Waasland-Beveren	(Belgium) Standard Liège	Undisclosed	
August 31, 2015	(Senegal) Ricardo Faty	(Belgium) Standard Liège	(Turkey) Bursaspor	Undisclosed	
August 31, 2015	(Belgium) David Hubert	(Belgium) Gent	(Belgium) Mouscron-Péruwelz	Loan	
August 31, 2015	(Belgium) Robin Leemans	(Belgium) Charleroi	(Belgium) Patro Eisden Maasmechelen	Loan	
August 31, 2015	(Romania) Cristian Manea	(England) Chelsea	(Belgium) Mouscron-Péruwelz	Loan	
August 31, 2015	(Netherlands) Sherjill MacDonald	(Belgium) Westerlo	(Netherlands) Sparta Rotterdam	Loan	
August 31, 2015	(Belgium) Gregory Mahau	(Belgium) Kortrijk	(Belgium) Coxyde	Loan	
August 31, 2015	(Portugal) Tozé Marreco	(Portugal) Tondela	(Belgium) Mouscron-Péruwelz	Undisclosed	
August 31, 2015	(Belgium) Ilombe Mboyo	(Belgium) Genk	(Switzerland) Sion	Undisclosed	
August 31, 2015	(Bosnia and Herzegovina) Deni Milošević	(Belgium) Standard Liège	(Belgium) Waasland-Beveren	Loan	
August 31, 2015	(Belgium) Geoffrey Mujangi Bia	(Belgium) Standard Liège	(Switzerland) Sion	Undisclosed	
August 31, 2015	(Netherlands) Albian Muzaqi	(Belgium) Genk	(Belgium) ASV Geel	Loan	
August 31, 2015	(Guadeloupe) Livio Nabab	(France) Auxerre	(Belgium) Waasland-Beveren	Undisclosed	
August 31, 2015	(Belgium) Willem Ofori-Appiah	(Belgium) Genk	Free agent	Released	(Note: Ofori-Appiah was on loan from Genk to MVV Maastricht during the 2014-15 season. The loan ended and Ofori-Appiah was released.)
August 31, 2015	(Nigeria) Kim Ojo	(Belgium) Genk	(Belgium) OH Leuven	Undisclosed	(Note: Ojo was on loan from Genk to Újpest during the 2014-15 season. The loan ended and Ojo was sold to OH Leuven.)
August 31, 2015	(Cameroon) Fabrice Olinga	(Spain) Málaga	(Belgium) Mouscron-Péruwelz	Undisclosed	
August 31, 2015	(United States) Shane O'Neill	(Cyprus) Apollon Limassol	(Belgium) Mouscron-Péruwelz	Undisclosed	
August 31, 2015	(Morocco) Mustapha Oussalah	(Belgium) Gent	(Belgium) Mouscron-Péruwelz	Loan	
August 31, 2015	(France) Jérémy Perbet	(Turkey) İstanbul Başakşehir	(Belgium) Charleroi	Loan	
August 31, 2015	(Brazil) Leandro Pereira	(Portugal) Palmeiras	(Belgium) Club Brugge	Undisclosed	
August 31, 2015	(Spain) Alejandro Pozuelo	(Spain) Rayo Vallecano	(Belgium) Genk	Undisclosed	
August 31, 2015	(Belgium) Jordan Renson	(Belgium) Sint-Truiden	(Belgium) Club Brugge	Undisclosed	
August 31, 2015	(Belgium) Lucas Schoofs	(Belgium) Gent	(Belgium) Lommel United	Loan	(Note: Schoofs was signed by Gent from Lommel United and immediately loaned out back to his former team.)
August 31, 2015	(Belgium) Yannick Thoelen	(Belgium) Lommel United	(Belgium) Gent	Undisclosed	
August 31, 2015	(Belgium) Kenneth Van Goethem	(Belgium) OH Leuven	(Belgium) Heist	Loan	
August 31, 2015	(Belgium) Jelle Vossen	(England) Burnley	(Belgium) Club Brugge	Undisclosed	
August 31, 2015	(Belgium) Jonathan Wilmet	(Belgium) Waasland-Beveren	(Belgium) Deinze	Loan	
August 31, 2015	(Mali) Sambou Yatabaré	(Greece) Olympiacos	(Belgium) Standard Liège	Loan	

=== September 2015 ===
Date	Name	Moving from	Moving to	Fee	Note
September 1, 2015	(Mali) Mamoutou N'Diaye	(Belgium) Zulte Waregem	(Belgium) Antwerp	Loan	
September 1, 2015	(Belgium) Obbi Oularé	(Belgium) Club Brugge	(England) Watford	Undisclosed	
September 2, 2015	(Sweden) Samuel Armenteros	(Belgium) Anderlecht	(Azerbaijan) Qarabağ	Undisclosed	(Note: Armenteros was on loan from Anderlecht to Willem II during the 2014-15 season. The loan ended and Armenteros was sold to Qarabağ.)
September 3, 2015	(Brazil) Vagner da Silva	(Portugal) Estoril	(Belgium) Mouscron-Péruwelz	Free	
September 7, 2015	(Netherlands) Glynor Plet	(Belgium) Zulte Waregem	(Israel) Maccabi Haifa	Undisclosed	(Note: Plet was on loan from Zulte Waregem to Go Ahead Eagles during the second half of the 2014-15 season. The loan ended and Plet was sold to Maccabi Haifa.)

== Sorted by team ==
=== Anderlecht ===
In:

No.	Pos.	Nation	Player
4	DF	SEN	Kara Mbodj (from (Belgium) Genk)
23	GK	BEL	Frank Boeckx (from (Belgium) Antwerp)
27	MF	EGY	Trezeguet (on loan from (Egypt) Al Ahly)
30	MF	BEL	Guillaume Gillet (loan return from (France) Bastia)
37	DF	SRB	Ivan Obradović (from (Belgium) Mechelen)
93	FW	NGR	Imoh Ezekiel (on loan from (Qatar) Al-Arabi)
99	FW	ITA	Stefano Okaka (from (Italy) Sampdoria)
—	FW	BEL	Clément Petit (from (Belgium) Mouscron-Péruwelz)
—	MF	ESP	Fede Vico (loan return from (Spain) Córdoba)

Out:

No.	Pos.	Nation	Player
2	DF	FRA	Maxime Colin (to (England) Brentford)
11	MF	GER	Marko Marin (loan return to (England) Chelsea)
13	DF	POR	Rolando (loan return to (Portugal) Porto)
15	FW	CIV	Cyriac (to (Belgium) Oostende)
22	DF	COD	Chancel Mbemba (to (England) Newcastle United)
26	GK	COD	Mulopo Kudimbana (to (Belgium) Antwerp)
41	MF	BEL	Mehdi Tarfi (to (Belgium) Antwerp)
42	FW	BEL	Nathan Kabasele (on loan to (Netherlands) De Graafschap)
45	FW	SRB	Aleksandar Mitrović (to (England) Newcastle United)
—	FW	SWE	Samuel Armenteros (was on loan to (Netherlands) Willem II, now sold to (Azerbaijan) Qarabağ)
—	MF	BEL	Samuel Bastien (on loan to (Italy) Avellino)
—	GK	BEL	Thomas Kaminski (was on loan to (Cyprus) Anorthosis Famagusta, now loaned to (Denmark) Copenhagen)
—	DF	SEN	Joher Khadim Rassoul (to (Belgium) Lokeren)
—	DF	BEL	Glenn Leemans (to (Belgium) Waasland-Beveren)
—	DF	BEL	Lorenzo Matarrese (to (Belgium) Genk)
—	MF	SRB	Luka Milivojević (was on loan to (Greece) Olympiacos, now sold)

=== Charleroi ===
In:

No.	Pos.	Nation	Player
5	DF	FRA	Benjamin Boulenger (from (France) Lens)
6	DF	MKD	Gjoko Zajkov (on loan from (France) Rennes)
9	FW	FRA	Florent Stevance (from (Belgium) Seraing United)
10	FW	BEL	David Pollet (from (Belgium) Gent)
24	DF	BEL	Dorian Dessoleil (from (Belgium) Virton)
45	FW	BEL	Roman Ferber (from (Belgium) Mons)
—	MF	SEN	Amara Baby (from (France) Auxerre)
—	FW	FRA	Jérémy Perbet (on loan from (Turkey) İstanbul Başakşehir)

Out:

No.	Pos.	Nation	Player
4	DF	BEL	Jonathan Vervoort (released)
6	DF	BEL	Sébastien Dewaest (to (Belgium) Genk)
18	FW	FRA	Cédric Fauré (to (Belgium) Union SG)
26	FW	MLI	Kalifa Coulibaly (to (Belgium) Gent)
80	MF	BEL	Kenneth Houdret (on loan to (Belgium) OH Leuven)
92	FW	COD	Neeskens Kebano (to (Belgium) Genk)
99	FW	FRA	Lynel Kitambala (released)
—	MF	FRA	Adrian Adam (on loan to (Belgium) Patro Eisden Maasmechelen)
—	MF	SEN	Mohamed Daf (on loan to (Belgium) WS Brussels)
—	DF	BEL	Robin Leemans (on loan to (Belgium) Patro Eisden Maasmechelen)
—	FW	BEL	Giuseppe Rossini (was on loan to (Belgium) OH Leuven, now sold to (Luxembourg) Progrès Niederkorn)
—	FW	SEN	Jamal Thiaré (was on loan to (France) Avranches, now sold)

=== Club Brugge ===
In:

No.	Pos.	Nation	Player
5	DF	FRA	Jean-Charles Castelletto (from (France) Auxerre)
9	FW	BEL	Jelle Vossen (from (England) Burnley)
10	FW	MLI	Abdoulay Diaby (from (France) Lille)
11	FW	AUS	Bernie Ibini (from (China) Shanghai SIPG)
16	GK	BEL	Sébastien Bruzzese (from (Belgium) Zulte Waregem)
17	FW	BRA	Leandro Pereira (from (Portugal) Palmeiras)
20	MF	BEL	Hans Vanaken (from (Belgium) Lokeren)
21	DF	BEL	Dion Cools (from (Belgium) OH Leuven)
27	GK	BEL	Michaël Cordier (from (Belgium) Westerlo)
30	MF	NGR	Mikel Agu (on loan from (Portugal) Porto)
38	GK	TUR	Sinan Bolat (on loan from (Portugal) Porto)
—	DF	BEL	Jordan Renson (from (Belgium) Sint-Truiden to (Belgium) Club Brugge U21)

Out:

No.	Pos.	Nation	Player
1	GK	AUS	Mathew Ryan (to (Spain) Valencia)
5	MF	CHI	Francisco Silva (loan return to (Spain) Osasuna)
9	FW	BEL	Tom De Sutter (to (Turkey) Bursaspor)
13	GK	GRE	Sokratis Dioudis (on loan to (Greece) Panionios)
14	FW	CRO	Fran Brodić (on loan to (Belgium) Antwerp)
33	GK	SRB	Vladan Kujović (retired)
42	FW	BEL	Nikola Storm (on loan to (Belgium) Zulte Waregem)
53	DF	BEL	Dario van den Buijs (to (Netherlands) FC Eindhoven)
57	MF	BEL	Yannick Reuten (on loan to (Belgium) Deinze)
58	FW	BEL	Obbi Oularé (to (England) Watford)
—	FW	NOR	Mushaga Bakenga (again on loan to (Norway) Molde)
—	FW	CHI	Nicolás Castillo (was on loan to (Germany) 1. FSV Mainz 05, now loaned to (Italy) Frosinone)
—	DF	BEL	Jimmy De Jonghe (was on loan to (Belgium) Roeselare, now loaned to (Belgium) Beerschot Wilrijk)
—	GK	BEL	Sven Dhoest (was on loan to (Belgium) Mouscron-Péruwelz, now sold to (Belgium) Wetteren)
—	FW	BEL	Zinho Gano (was on loan to (Belgium) Mouscron-Péruwelz, now sold to (Belgium) Waasland-Beveren)
—	DF	BEL	Aristote Nkaka (from (Belgium) Club Brugge U19 to (Belgium) Mouscron-Péruwelz)
—	FW	LAT	Valērijs Šabala (was on loan to (Czech Republic) Jablonec, now loaned to (Poland) Miedź Legnica)
—	FW	POL	Waldemar Sobota (again on loan to (Germany) St. Pauli)
—	DF	BEL	Birger Verstraete (was on loan to (Belgium) Mouscron-Péruwelz, now sold to (Belgium) Kortrijk)

=== Genk ===
In:

No.	Pos.	Nation	Player
6	DF	BEL	Sébastien Dewaest (from (Belgium) Charleroi)
9	FW	TUR	Enes Ünal (on loan from (England) Manchester City)
11	FW	BEL	Igor de Camargo (from (Belgium) Standard Liège)
31	MF	JAM	Leon Bailey (from (Slovakia) Trenčín)
71	MF	BEL	Yoni Buyens (from (Belgium) Standard Liège)
—	FW	COD	Neeskens Kebano (from (Belgium) Charleroi)
—	DF	BEL	Lorenzo Matarrese (from (Belgium) Anderlecht)
—	MF	ESP	Alejandro Pozuelo (from (Spain) Rayo Vallecano)

Out:

No.	Pos.	Nation	Player
2	DF	SEN	Kara Mbodj (to (Belgium) Anderlecht)
7	MF	TTO	Khaleem Hyland (to (Belgium) Westerlo)
8	MF	FRA	Steeven Joseph-Monrose (to (France) Brest)
11	MF	COD	Hervé Kage (to (Belgium) Kortrijk)
16	DF	RSA	Anele Ngcongca (on loan to (France) Troyes)
17	MF	SRB	Aleksandar Čavrić (on loan to (Denmark) Aarhus)
20	MF	SRB	Sergej Milinković-Savić (to (Italy) Lazio)
21	FW	CIV	Sekou Cissé (on loan to (France) Sochaux)
23	FW	BEL	Benjamin De Ceulaer (to (Belgium) Westerlo)
99	MF	BEL	Ilombe Mboyo (to (Switzerland) Sion)
—	MF	TUN	Fabien Camus (was on loan to (France) Evian, now released to (France) Troyes)
—	MF	BEL	Jordy Croux (was on loan to (Netherlands) MVV, now sold)
—	FW	BEL	Jentl Gaethofs (again on loan to (Belgium) Lommel United)
—	FW	NED	Albian Muzaqi (was on loan to (Belgium) Cercle Brugge, now loaned to (Belgium) ASV Geel)
—	FW	NGR	Kennedy Nwanganga (was on loan to (Belgium) Roeselare, now released)
—	DF	BEL	Willem Ofori-Appiah (was on loan to (Netherlands) MVV, now released)
—	FW	NGR	Kim Ojo (was on loan to (Hungary) Újpest, now sold to (Belgium) OH Leuven)
—	MF	BEL	Stef Peeters (was on loan to (Netherlands) MVV, now sold)
—	FW	BEL	Leandro Trossard (was on loan to (Belgium) Lommel United, now loaned to (Belgium) OH Leuven)
—	FW	BEL	Jelle Vossen (was on loan to (England) Middlesbrough, now sold to (England) Burnley)

=== Gent ===
In:

No.	Pos.	Nation	Player
23	DF	DEN	Lasse Nielsen (was on loan from (Netherlands) NEC, now bought)
—	DF	ISR	Hatem Abd Elhamed (from (Israel) Ashdod)
—	FW	MLI	Kalifa Coulibaly (from (Belgium) Charleroi)
—	DF	SWE	Erik Johansson (from (Sweden) Malmö)
—	MF	BEL	Thomas Matton (from (Belgium) Kortrijk)
—	DF	SRB	Stefan Mitrović (on loan from (Germany) SC Freiburg)
—	GK	BEL	Yannick Thoelen (from (Belgium) Lommel United)

Out:

No.	Pos.	Nation	Player
5	DF	FRA	Karim Belhocine (retired, became assistant manager at (Belgium) Kortrijk)
6	MF	BIH	Nermin Zolotić (on loan to (Croatia) Istra)
7	FW	BEL	David Pollet (to (Belgium) Charleroi)
11	MF	MAR	Mustapha Oussalah (on loan to (Belgium) Mouscron-Péruwelz)
13	DF	CRO	Ante Puljić (to (Romania) Dinamo Bucharest)
—	FW	BEL	Jinty Caenepeel (was on loan to (Belgium) Cercle Brugge, now sold to (Netherlands) FC Eindhoven)
—	DF	BEL	Wouter Corstjens (was on loan to (Belgium) Waasland-Beveren, now sold to (Greece) Panetolikos)
—	MF	ALB	Enis Gavazaj (on loan to (Belgium) Roeselare)
—	MF	BEL	David Hubert (was on loan to (Belgium) Waasland-Beveren, now loaned to (Belgium) Mouscron-Péruwelz)
—	MF	BEL	Rik Impens (again on loan to (Belgium) Roeselare)
—	GK	BEL	Matthias Janssens (to (Belgium) Waasland-Beveren)
—	FW	ZAM	Rodgers Kola (was on loan to (Israel) Ironi Kiryat Shmona, now loaned to (Greece) Veria)
—	FW	GUF	Sloan Privat (was on loan to (France) Caen, now loaned to (France) Guingamp)
—	MF	BEL	Lucas Schoofs (signed from (Belgium) Lommel United and back on loan to Lommel United)
—	GK	MKD	Damjan Šiškovski (loan return to (North Macedonia) Rabotnički)
—	DF	NGR	William Troost-Ekong (from (Netherlands) Groningen, now loaned to (Norway) Haugesund)
—	MF	BEL	Jari Vandeputte (was on loan to (Belgium) Roeselare, now loaned to (Netherlands) FC Eindhoven)
—	MF	NGR	Sad'eeq Yusuf (from (Nigeria) GBS Academy, now loaned to (Norway) Haugesund)

=== Kortrijk ===
In:

No.	Pos.	Nation	Player
3	DF	FRA	Fabien Boyer (from (France) Angers)
5	DF	BEL	Birger Verstraete (from (Belgium) Club Brugge)
9	MF	COD	Hervé Kage (from (Belgium) Genk)
20	DF	FRA	Samuel Gigot (from (France) Arles-Avignon)
22	FW	BEL	Michaël Lallemand (from (Belgium) Eupen)
25	FW	GRE	Thanasis Papazoglou (from (Greece) Olympiacos)
26	MF	FRA	Elohim Rolland (from (France) Boulogne)
27	FW	FRA	Aboubakar Kamara (from (France) Monaco)
28	GK	BEL	Gilles Lentz (from (Belgium) Roeselare)
30	MF	BEL	Kristof D'Haene (from (Belgium) Cercle Brugge)
—	FW	CRO	Tomislav Kiš (from (Croatia) Hajduk Split)
—	GK	GRE	Michalis Sifakis (from (Greece) Levadiakos)

Out:

No.	Pos.	Nation	Player
9	FW	FRA	Teddy Chevalier (to (Turkey) Çaykur Rizespor)
18	FW	CRO	Ivan Santini (to (Belgium) Standard Liège)
19	MF	BEL	Gregory Mahau (on loan to (Belgium) Coxyde)
20	MF	BEL	Thomas Matton (to (Belgium) Gent)
21	DF	BEL	Brecht Capon (to (Belgium) Oostende)
26	GK	BEL	Laurent Henkinet (to (Belgium) Waasland-Beveren)

=== Lokeren ===
In:

No.	Pos.	Nation	Player
—	MF	UKR	Serhiy Bolbat (on loan from (Ukraine) Shakhtar Donetsk)
—	DF	BEL	Joey Dujardin (from (Belgium) Zulte Waregem)
—	FW	CMR	Lewis Enoh (from (Portugal) Sporting CP)
—	FW	ISR	Mohammad Ghadir (from (Israel) Maccabi Haifa)
—	DF	SEN	Joher Khadim Rassoul (from (Belgium) Anderlecht)
—	MF	SRB	Marko Mirić (from (Croatia) Slaven Belupo)
—	DF	SVK	Branislav Niňaj (from (Slovakia) Slovan Bratislava)
—	MF	POL	Filip Starzyński (from (Poland) Ruch Chorzów)
—	DF	CRO	Mario Tičinović (from (Denmark) Nordsjælland)

Out:

No.	Pos.	Nation	Player
9	FW	SEN	Mbaye Leye (to (Belgium) Zulte Waregem)
14	MF	BEL	Jordan Remacle (to (Belgium) OH Leuven)
16	MF	BEL	Jore Trompet (to (Belgium) Westerlo)
20	MF	BEL	Hans Vanaken (to (Belgium) Club Brugge)
25	DF	BEL	Alexander Corryn (to (Belgium) Mechelen)
26	MF	BEL	Cedric Mingiedi (to (Belgium) Mechelen)
29	MF	BEL	Nill De Pauw (to (France) Guingamp)

=== Mechelen ===
In:

No.	Pos.	Nation	Player
—	GK	BEL	Colin Coosemans (from (Belgium) Waasland-Beveren)
—	DF	BEL	Alexander Corryn (from (Belgium) Lokeren)
—	GK	BEL	Jean-François Gillet (on loan from (Italy) Catania)
—	MF	BEL	Cedric Mingiedi (from (Belgium) Lokeren)
—	DF	ALG	Mourad Satli (from (Romania) Petrolul Ploiești)
—	DF	MNE	Vladimir Volkov (from (Serbia) Partizan Belgrade)

Out:

No.	Pos.	Nation	Player
1	GK	BEL	Wouter Biebauw (to (Belgium) Oostende)
6	DF	TTO	Sheldon Bateau (on loan to (Russia) Krylia Sovetov Samara)
18	MF	BEL	Jan Mertens (to (Belgium) Lommel United)
19	MF	BEL	Maxime Biset (to (Belgium) Antwerp)
26	FW	NED	Stevy Okitokandjo (on loan to (Belgium) Patro Eisden Maasmechelen)
37	DF	SRB	Ivan Obradović (to (Belgium) Anderlecht)
—	FW	BEL	Jason Adesanya (was on loan to (Belgium) Lommel United, now loaned to (Belgium) Antwerp)
—	MF	BEL	David Destorme (was on loan to (Belgium) Waasland-Beveren, now sold)
—	MF	DEN	Thomas Enevoldsen (was on loan to (Denmark) AaB, now sold)
—	MF	GHA	Abdul-Yakuni Iddi (loan return from (Belgium) OH Leuven, then released)

=== Mouscron-Péruwelz ===
In:

No.	Pos.	Nation	Player
1	GK	ISR	Ofir Martziano (on loan from (Israel) Ashdod)
2	DF	SRB	Nikola Aksentijević (from (Serbia) OFK Belgrade)
3	DF	BEL	Noë Dussenne (from (Belgium) Cercle Brugge)
7	MF	BEL	Yahya Boumediene (from (Belgium) Seraing United)
8	MF	BEL	François Marquet (on loan from (Belgium) Standard Liège)
12	GK	BEL	Thibaut Rausin (from (Belgium) Westerlo)
15	DF	SLO	Emir Dautović (from (Serbia) OFK Belgrade)
20	DF	BEL	Aristote Nkaka (from (Belgium) Club Brugge U19)
21	MF	BEL	Selim Amallah (from (Belgium) Mons)
23	DF	BEL	Mickael Tirpan (from (Belgium) Seraing United)
26	DF	BEL	Luigi Vaccaro (from (Belgium) Seraing United)
27	FW	POR	Frédéric Maciel (from (Portugal) Porto)
30	MF	SRB	Marko Pavlovski (from (Portugal) Porto)
33	GK	BEL	Théo Defourny (from (Belgium) Virton)
—	MF	TUR	Muhammed Demirci (from (Turkey) Beşiktaş)
—	DF	SRB	Nikola Gulan (from (Spain) Mallorca)
—	MF	BEL	David Hubert (on loan from (Belgium) Gent)
—	DF	ROU	Cristian Manea (on loan from (England) Chelsea)
—	FW	POR	Tozé Marreco (from (Portugal) Tondela)
—	FW	CMR	Fabrice Olinga (from (Spain) Málaga)
—	DF	USA	Shane O'Neill (from (Cyprus) Apollon Limassol)
—	MF	MAR	Mustapha Oussalah (on loan from (Belgium) Gent)
—	FW	SRB	Marko Šćepović (on loan from (Greece) Olympiacos)
—	GK	BRA	Vagner da Silva (from (Portugal) Estoril)

Out:

No.	Pos.	Nation	Player
4	DF	FRA	Alexandre Coeff (loan return to (Italy) Udinese)
5	DF	BEL	Pieterjan Monteyne (to (Belgium) OH Leuven)
7	FW	BEL	Zinho Gano (loan return to (Belgium) Club Brugge)
8	DF	BEL	Birger Verstraete (loan return to (Belgium) Club Brugge)
20	GK	BEL	Sven Dhoest (loan return to (Belgium) Club Brugge)
21	DF	FRA	Julian Jeanvier (loan return to (France) Lille)
23	MF	FRA	Ronny Rodelin (loan return to (France) Lille)
25	DF	FRA	Benjamin Delacourt (to (Belgium) Deinze)
26	MF	FRA	Kévin Vandendriessche (to (Belgium) Oostende)
30	MF	FRA	Steeven Langil (to (Belgium) Waasland-Beveren)
—	GK	FRA	Jérémy Dumesnil (loan return to (Belgium) Oostende)
—	FW	BEL	Clément Petit (to (Belgium) Anderlecht)

=== Oostende ===
In:

No.	Pos.	Nation	Player
4	DF	FRA	Fabien Antunes (from (Belgium) Virton)
9	FW	CIV	Cyriac (from (Belgium) Anderlecht)
14	DF	CZE	David Rozehnal (from (France) Lille)
17	FW	NGR	Joseph Akpala (from (Turkey) Karabükspor)
24	FW	BEL	Mathieu Cornet (from (Belgium) Virton)
25	GK	BEL	Wouter Biebauw (from (Belgium) Mechelen)
26	MF	FRA	Kévin Vandendriessche (from (Belgium) Mouscron-Péruwelz)
27	DF	BEL	Brecht Capon (from (Belgium) Kortrijk)
90	MF	BEL	Yannick Loemba (from (Belgium) Mons)
—	MF	NGR	Godwin Saviour (on loan from (Nigeria) El-Kadme Academy)

Out:

No.	Pos.	Nation	Player
4	DF	BEL	Carl Hoefkens (to (Gibraltar) Manchester 62)
8	MF	BEL	Niels Coussement (on loan to (Belgium) Roeselare)
14	MF	BEL	Tom Van Imschoot (to (Netherlands) FC Eindhoven)
17	DF	BEL	Yoshi Verbrugge (on loan to (Belgium) Ingelmunster)
29	FW	CRC	John Jairo Ruiz (loan return to (France) Lille)
—	GK	FRA	Jérémy Dumesnil (was on loan to (Belgium) Mouscron-Péruwelz, now released to (Belgium) Coxyde)
—	FW	BEL	Muhamed Tahiri (on loan to (Belgium) Ingelmunster)
—	FW	BEL	Jonathan Wilmet (was on loan to (Belgium) Waasland-Beveren, now sold)

=== Oud-Heverlee Leuven ===
In:

No.	Pos.	Nation	Player
5	DF	BEL	Pierre-Yves Ngawa (from (Belgium) Lierse)
7	MF	BEL	Jordan Remacle (from (Belgium) Lokeren)
9	FW	CUW	Romero Regales (from (Belgium) Lommel United)
12	MF	BEL	Kenneth Houdret (on loan from (Belgium) Charleroi)
16	DF	GRE	Konstantinos Rougalas (from (Greece) Iraklis)
17	DF	SRB	Slobodan Urošević (on loan from (Serbia) Napredak Kruševac)
19	FW	BEL	Leandro Trossard (on loan from (Belgium) Genk)
22	MF	GHA	Samuel Asamoah (on loan from (Belgium) Eupen)
26	GK	FRA	Rudy Riou (from (France) Lens)
27	FW	NGR	Kim Ojo (from (Belgium) Genk)
28	DF	UKR	Oleksandr Volovyk (on loan from (Ukraine) Shakhtar Donetsk)
29	DF	BEL	Pieterjan Monteyne (from (Belgium) Mouscron-Péruwelz)

Out:

No.	Pos.	Nation	Player
5	DF	BEL	Kenny Thompson (to (Belgium) Beerschot Wilrijk)
6	MF	BEL	Kenneth Van Goethem (on loan to (Belgium) Heist)
7	MF	BEL	Ben Yagan (end of contract)
9	FW	BEL	Giuseppe Rossini (loan return to (Belgium) Charleroi)
12	DF	BEL	Dion Cools (to (Belgium) Club Brugge)
17	MF	BEL	Simon Bracke (on loan to (Belgium) ASV Geel)
19	FW	COD	Ibrahim Somé (to (Belgium) WS Brussels)
20	DF	BEL	Matthias Trenson (to (Belgium) Hasselt)
22	GK	BEL	Senne Vits (to (Belgium) Standard Liège)
26	GK	BEL	Logan Bailly (to (Scotland) Celtic)
27	MF	BEL	Yohan Brouckaert (on loan to (Belgium) Roeselare)
28	FW	COD	Olivier Lusamba (to (Belgium) Aalst)
—	MF	GHA	Abdul-Yakuni Iddi (loan return to (Belgium) Mechelen)
—	DF	BEL	David Wijns (was on loan to (Belgium) Heist, now transferred permanently)

=== Sint-Truiden ===
In:

No.	Pos.	Nation	Player
1	GK	BEL	Yves De Winter (from (Netherlands) AZ)
5	MF	ESP	Alfonso Artabe (from (Spain) Atlético Baleares)
9	FW	BEL	Yannis Mbombo (on loan from (Belgium) Standard Liège)
10	FW	FRA	Jean-Luc Dompé (from (France) Valenciennes)
11	FW	FRA	Yohan Boli (from (Belgium) Verviers)
15	DF	CHI	Cristián Cuevas (on loan from (England) Chelsea)
18	DF	CIV	Mamadou Bagayoko (from (Slovakia) Slovan Bratislava)
25	FW	JPN	Yuji Ono (from (Belgium) Standard Liège)
26	DF	POR	Rúben Fernandes (from (Portugal) Estoril)
29	MF	CIV	Victorien Angban (on loan from (England) Chelsea)
30	FW	COL	Joao Rodríguez (on loan from (England) Chelsea)
—	MF	GRE	Panagiotis Kynigopoulos (from (Greece) Aiginiakos)
—	DF	MLI	Falaye Sacko (on loan from (Hungary) Újpest)

Out:

No.	Pos.	Nation	Player
1	GK	BEL	Davy Schollen (retired)
2	DF	ALB	Mërgim Vojvoda (loan return to (Belgium) Standard Liège)
5	DF	BDI	David Habarugira (released)
10	MF	BEL	Redouan Aalhoul (released)
11	MF	BEL	Joeri Dequevy (to (Belgium) Antwerp)
14	DF	BEL	Dimitri Daeseleire (to (Belgium) Antwerp)
32	GK	UKR	Ihor Berezovskyi (loan return to (Belgium) Lierse)
—	MF	BEL	Christophe Bertjens (was on loan to (Belgium) Bocholt, now released to (Belgium) Lommel United)
—	FW	POL	Piotr Parzyszek (loan return to (England) Charlton Athletic)
—	DF	BEL	Jordan Renson (to (Belgium) Club Brugge)
—	DF	URU	Rodrigo Rojo (loan return to (Hungary) Újpest)
—	FW	BEL	Ivan Yagan (to (Belgium) Cercle Brugge)

=== Standard Liège ===
In:

No.	Pos.	Nation	Player
3	MF	MAR	Ahmed El Messaoudi (on loan from (Belgium) Lierse)
7	MF	FRA	Anthony Knockaert (from (England) Leicester City)
8	MF	BEL	Faysel Kasmi (on loan from (Belgium) Lierse)
9	FW	BEL	Renaud Emond (from (Belgium) Waasland-Beveren)
10	FW	GUI	Mohamed Yattara (from (France) Lyon)
11	FW	GHA	Benjamin Tetteh (from (Ghana) Dreams)
14	MF	BEL	Christian Brüls (on loan from (France) Rennes)
18	FW	CRO	Ivan Santini (from (Belgium) Kortrijk)
25	MF	POR	Rochinha (from (Portugal) Benfica)
27	DF	COL	Darwin Andrade (was on loan from (Hungary) Újpest, now bought)
—	MF	MLI	Alassane Diallo (loan return from (Belgium) Westerlo)
—	MF	TOG	Mathieu Dossevi (on loan from (Greece) Olympiacos)
—	GK	BEL	Senne Vits (from (Belgium) OH Leuven)
—	MF	MLI	Sambou Yatabaré (on loan from (Greece) Olympiacos)

Out:

No.	Pos.	Nation	Player
1	GK	JPN	Eiji Kawashima (end of contract)
4	MF	SEN	Ricardo Faty (to (Turkey) Bursaspor)
8	MF	NED	Ronnie Stam (to (Netherlands) NAC Breda)
10	FW	BEL	Igor de Camargo (to (Belgium) Genk)
11	MF	SWE	Jiloan Hamad (loan return to (Germany) TSG Hoffenheim)
14	FW	JPN	Yuji Ono (to (Belgium) Sint-Truiden)
27	MF	HAI	Jeff Louis (to (France) Caen)
33	MF	MAR	Mehdi Carcela (to (Portugal) Benfica)
45	MF	BEL	François Marquet (was on loan to (Netherlands) PSV, now loaned to (Belgium) Mouscron-Péruwelz)
63	MF	BEL	Geoffrey Mujangi Bia (to (Switzerland) Sion)
67	MF	BEL	Tortol Lumanza (contract terminated)
—	MF	SWE	Astrit Ajdarević (was on loan to (Sweden) Helsingborg, now released to (Sweden) Örebro)
—	MF	GAB	Frédéric Bulot (was on loan to (England) Charlton Athletic, now sold to (France) Reims)
—	MF	BEL	Yoni Buyens (was on loan to (England) Charlton Athletic, now sold to (Belgium) Genk)
—	DF	BEL	Maximiliano Caufriez (to (Belgium) Waasland-Beveren)
—	FW	NGR	Imoh Ezekiel (loan return to (Qatar) Al-Arabi)
—	GK	BEL	Merveille Goblet (was on loan to (Belgium) Tubize, now released to (Belgium) Waasland-Beveren)
—	MF	TUR	Anıl Koç (to (Netherlands) FC Eindhoven)
—	FW	BEL	Yannis Mbombo (was on loan to (France) Auxerre, now loaned to (Belgium) Sint-Truiden)
—	MF	BIH	Deni Milošević (on loan to (Belgium) Waasland-Beveren)
—	MF	COD	Paul-Jose M'Poku (was on loan to (Italy) Cagliari, now loaned to (Italy) Chievo Verona)
—	MF	TUR	Alpaslan Öztürk (was on loan to (Turkey) Kasımpaşa, now loaned to (Turkey) Eskişehirspor)
—	GK	BEL	Lucas Pirard (on loan to (Belgium) Lommel United)
—	MF	NED	Danny Verbeek (was on loan to (Netherlands) Utrecht, now released to (Netherlands) NAC Breda)
—	FW	ESP	Jonathan Viera (was on loan to (Spain) Las Palmas, now sold)
—	DF	ALB	Mërgim Vojvoda (was on loan to (Belgium) Sint-Truiden, now loaned to (Germany) Carl Zeiss Jena)

=== Waasland-Beveren ===
In:

No.	Pos.	Nation	Player
1	GK	BEL	Laurent Henkinet (from (Belgium) Kortrijk)
2	DF	SWE	Erdin Demir (from (Norway) Brann Bergen)
4	DF	FIN	Valtteri Moren (from (Finland) HJK Helsinki)
5	DF	ANG	Jonathan Buatu Mananga (from (England) Fulham)
6	FW	BEL	Jonathan Wilmet (was on loan from (Belgium) Oostende, now bought)
7	MF	FRA	Steeven Langil (from (Belgium) Mouscron-Péruwelz)
8	MF	FRA	Gary Coulibaly (from (France) Ajaccio)
9	FW	BEL	Zinho Gano (from (Belgium) Club Brugge)
15	MF	FRA	Thibault Moulin (from (France) Clermont Foot)
17	MF	BEL	David Destorme (was on loan from (Belgium) Mechelen, now bought)
18	GK	BEL	Merveille Goblet (from (Belgium) Standard Liège)
19	DF	BEL	Glenn Leemans (from (Belgium) Anderlecht)
21	DF	LUX	Laurent Jans (from (Luxembourg) Fola Esch)
23	DF	BEL	Maximiliano Caufriez (from (Belgium) Standard Liège)
26	GK	BEL	Matthias Janssens (from (Belgium) Gent)
31	MF	BEL	Emre Erciyas (from (Belgium) Lierse)
32	MF	BEL	Olivier Myny (from (Belgium) Roeselare)
—	MF	BIH	Deni Milošević (on loan from (Belgium) Standard Liège)
—	FW	GLP	Livio Nabab (from (France) Auxerre)

Out:

No.	Pos.	Nation	Player
2	DF	BEL	Wouter Corstjens (loan return to (Belgium) Gent)
3	DF	CRO	Hrvoje Čale (released)
4	DF	BRA	Robson (released)
5	DF	MNE	Mijuško Bojović (to (Cyprus) Enosis Neon Paralimni)
6	MF	BEL	David Hubert (loan return to (Belgium) Gent)
7	DF	GHA	David Addy (released)
8	MF	BEL	Robin Henkens (released)
9	FW	CRO	Ante Vukušić (loan return to (Italy) Pescara)
11	FW	BEL	Dylan De Belder (on loan to (Belgium) Lommel United)
14	FW	CMR	Aboubakar Oumarou (to (Serbia) Partizan)
16	FW	BEL	Renaud Emond (to (Belgium) Standard-Liège)
17	MF	FRA	Nicolas Godemèche (released)
18	GK	BEL	Kenny Steppe (to (Belgium) Zulte Waregem)
19	DF	FRA	Cédric D'Ulivo (to (Belgium) Zulte Waregem)
22	DF	BEL	Siebe Blondelle (to (Belgium) Eupen)
23	MF	BEL	Jorn Vermeulen (released)
24	MF	BEL	René Sterckx (released)
26	GK	BEL	Colin Coosemans (to (Belgium) Mechelen)
39	MF	FRA	Rachid Bourabia (released)
—	MF	BEL	Jonathan Wilmet (to (Belgium) Deinze)
—	FW	GHA	Kevin Osei (to (England) Carlisle United)

=== Westerlo ===
In:

No.	Pos.	Nation	Player
1	GK	BEL	Kristof Van Hout (from (India) Delhi Dynamos)
3	DF	BEL	Filip Daems (from (Germany) Borussia Mönchengladbach)
4	MF	BEL	Jore Trompet (from (Belgium) Lokeren)
5	DF	SRB	Nikola Petković (from (Australia) Sydney FC)
6	MF	TTO	Khaleem Hyland (from (Belgium) Genk)
10	FW	BEL	Benjamin De Ceulaer (from (Belgium) Genk)
90	FW	LAT	Eduards Višņakovs (from (Poland) Ruch Chorzów)
—	FW	MAR	Younes Bnou Marzouk (on loan from (Italy) Juventus)
—	MF	NOR	Vajebah Sakor (on loan from (Italy) Juventus)

Out:

No.	Pos.	Nation	Player
1	GK	BEL	Michaël Cordier (to (Belgium) Club Brugge)
4	DF	BEL	Birger Maertens (to (Belgium) Westhoek)
6	MF	BEL	Kevin Geudens (to (Belgium) Beerschot Wilrijk)
9	FW	BEL	Kevin Vandenbergh (to (Belgium) Dessel Sport)
11	FW	NED	Sherjill MacDonald (on loan to (Netherlands) Sparta Rotterdam)
15	DF	GER	Christian Dorda (to (Germany) Hansa Rostock)
20	MF	MLI	Alassane Diallo (loan return to (Belgium) Standard Liège)
21	MF	BEL	Nicolas Rommens (to (Belgium) Dessel Sport)
25	DF	BIH	Enes Šipović (to (Morocco) Ittihad Tanger)
—	GK	BEL	Thibaut Rausin (to (Belgium) Mouscron-Péruwelz)

=== Zulte Waregem ===
In:

No.	Pos.	Nation	Player
2	DF	FRA	Cédric D'Ulivo (from (Belgium) Waasland-Beveren)
3	DF	CGO	Marvin Baudry (from (France) Amiens)
4	DF	FRA	Abdou Diallo (on loan from (France) Monaco)
6	DF	COD	Joël Sami (from (France) Nancy)
7	FW	SEN	Mame Baba Thiam (on loan from (Italy) Juventus)
9	FW	SEN	Mbaye Leye (from (Belgium) Lokeren)
10	MF	BEL	Steve De Ridder (on loan from (Denmark) Copenhagen)
11	FW	BEL	Stephen Buyl (from (Belgium) Cercle Brugge)
22	GK	BEL	Kenny Steppe (from (Belgium) Waasland-Beveren)
23	MF	BEL	Christophe Lepoint (from (England) Charlton Athletic)
—	FW	BEL	Nikola Storm (on loan from (Belgium) Club Brugge)

Out:

No.	Pos.	Nation	Player
2	DF	FRA	Yarouba Cissako (loan return to (France) Monaco)
3	DF	BEL	Steve Colpaert (to (Belgium) Antwerp)
6	DF	POR	Tiago Ferreira (to (Portugal) União da Madeira)
7	MF	BEL	Tom Rosenthal (to (England) Queens Park Rangers)
10	MF	AUS	James Troisi (loan return to (Italy) Juventus)
12	FW	MKD	Aleksandar Trajkovski (to (Italy) Palermo)
13	MF	MLI	Mamoutou N'Diaye (to (Belgium) Antwerp)
16	MF	ISL	Ólafur Ingi Skúlason (to (Turkey) Gençlerbirliği)
18	MF	BEL	Kylian Hazard (to (Hungary) Újpest)
19	FW	SUI	Karim Rossi (to (Italy) Spezia)
21	MF	BEL	Mohamed Messoudi (to (Morocco) Raja Casablanca)
22	GK	BEL	Sébastien Bruzzese (to (Belgium) Club Brugge)
36	DF	BEL	Joey Dujardin (to (Belgium) Lokeren)
—	FW	NED	Glynor Plet (was on loan to (Netherlands) Go Ahead Eagles, now sold to (Israel) Maccabi Haifa)
