= Merveille =

Merveille (French "marvel, wonder") may refer to:

== People ==
- Merveille Lukeba (born 1990), British actor
- Merveille Bokadi (born 1992), Congolese professional footballer
- Merveille Goblet (born 1994), Belgian footballer
- Bobbie Merveille or DJ Heavygrinder, American DJ

== Other uses ==
- Merveilles (album), 1998 album by the Japanese rock band Malice Mizer
- Merveille (beignet)
- Merveille, type of Barbaroux wine
- The "Merveille", part of Mont Saint Michel Abbey
