= 2014 Belgian Cup final =

- Event: 2013–14 Belgian Cup
Lokeren	Zulte Waregem
1	0
- Date: 22 March 2014
- Venue: King Baudouin Stadium, Brussels
- Referee: Luc Wouters
- Attendance: 40,000

The 2014 Belgian Cup final, named Cofidis Cup after the sponsor, was the 59th Belgian Cup final and took place on 22 March 2014 between Lokeren and Zulte Waregem. It was won by Lokeren with the only goal coming from Alexander Scholz. For Lokeren it was their second cup win in three years.

== Route to the final ==
Lokeren				Zulte Waregem
Opponent	Result	Legs	Round	Opponent	Result	Legs
ASV Geel (II)	1–0	1–0 away	Sixth round	Hamme (III)	2–1	2–1 away
Waasland-Beveren	3–1	3–1 away	Seventh round	Charleroi	3–0	3–0 away
Westerlo (II)	5–2	1–0 away; 4–2 home	Quarter-finals	Cercle Brugge	3–3 (a.g.)	1–0 home; 2–3 away
Oostende	2–2 (8–7 p)	1–1 home; 1–1 away (a.e.t.)	Semi-finals	Gent	1–0	1–0 away; 0–0 home

== Match ==
=== Summary ===
Zulte Waregem had the best opportunities in a closed first half. Both Idrissa Sylla and Mbaye Leye saw their shot hit the post, while Lokeren only had one decent chance, the header of Nill De Pauw going wide.

In the second half, the goal by Jens Naessens was correctly disallowed for offside. With just under an hour played, Alexander Scholz headed the ball into the top corner of the goal, which would remain the only goal of the game as Zulte Waregem did not manage to break through the Lokeren defence in the last half-hour, even though they saw most of the ball.

=== Details ===
22 March 2014
20:30 CET

Lokeren	1–0	Zulte Waregem
Scholz 57'	Report

King Baudouin Stadium, Brussels
Attendance: 40,000
Referee: Luc Wouters

Lokeren	Zulte Waregem

GK	1	(Ivory Coast) Copa
RB	13	(Greece) Georgios Galitsios
CB	5	(Switzerland) Mijat Marić
CB	2	(Denmark) Alexander Scholz
LB	3	(Ghana) Denis Odoi
MF	29	(Belgium) Nill De Pauw		(substituted off) 80'
MF	8	(Belgium) Koen Persoons	(yellow card) 86'
MF	20	(Belgium) Hans Vanaken		(substituted off) 88'
MF	7	(Belgium) Killian Overmeire (c)	(yellow card) 73'
FW	19	(Brazil) Junior Dutra	(yellow card) 82'	(substituted off) 90+3'
FW	9	(Tunisia) Hamdi Harbaoui
Substitutes:
DF	4	(Belgium) Gregory Mertens		(substituted on) 90+3'
MF	11	(Belgium) Onur Kaya		(substituted on) 80'
FW	14	(Belgium) Jordan Remacle
MF	16	(Belgium) Jore Trompet		(substituted on) 88'
FW	23	(Ghana) Eugene Ansah
FW	24	(South Africa) Ayanda Patosi
GK	30	(Belgium) Davino Verhulst
Manager:
(Belgium) Peter Maes

GK	22	(Belgium) Sébastien Bruzzese
RB	2	(Belgium) Davy De Fauw (c)
CB	3	(Belgium) Steve Colpaert	(yellow card) 29'
CB	24	(Belgium) Karel D'Haene
LB	5	(Belgium) Bryan Verboom		(substituted off) 81'
FW	14	(Belgium) Jens Naessens
CM	8	(Belgium) Sven Kums
CM	10	(Belgium) Thorgan Hazard	(yellow card) 77'
LW	13	(Mali) Mamoutou N'Diaye		(substituted off) 66'
AM	11	(Guinea) Idrissa Sylla
CF	9	(Senegal) Mbaye Leye		(substituted off) 66'
Substitutes:
GK	1	(Belgium) Sammy Bossut
FW	7	(Cameroon) Fabrice Olinga
MF	16	(Iceland) Ólafur Ingi Skúlason
MF	17	(Guinea) Ibrahima Conté		(substituted on) 66'
FW	19	(France) Raphaël Cacérès		(substituted on) 66'
DF	21	(Belgium) Bruno Godeau
FW	27	(Belgium) Theo Bongonda		(substituted on) 81'
Manager:
(Belgium) Francky Dury

Assistant referees:
(Belgium)
(Belgium)
Fourth official:
(Belgium)

Match rules

- 90 minutes.
- 30 minutes of extra time if necessary.
- Penalty shoot-out if scores still level.
- Seven named substitutes.
- Maximum of three substitutions.
