= Clément Petit =

Clément Petit may refer to:

- Clément Petit (footballer)
- Clément Petit (cyclist)
