= Jan Mertens =

Jan Mertens may refer to:

- Jan Mertens the Younger (died c. 1527), South Netherlandish painter, son of the sculptor Jan Mertens the Elder
- Jan Mertens (Catholic People's Party) (1916–2000), Dutch politician
- Jan Mertens (cyclist) (1904–1964), Belgian cyclist
- Jan Mertens (footballer) (born 1995), Belgian footballer
