= Gregory Mahau =

Belgian footballer

Personal information
- Date of birth: 9 May 1994 (age 32)
- Place of birth: Belgium
- Height: 1.74 m (5 ft 9 in)
- Position: Left winger

Team information
- Current team: KWS Houthulst

Youth career
- 2000–2012: Kortrijk

Senior career*
Years	Team	Apps	(Gls)
2014–2016	Kortrijk	18	(0)
2015–2016	→ Coxyde (loan)	17	(0)
2016–2017	Sint-Eloois-Winkel		
2017–2018	Londerzeel		
2018–2019	KSCT Menen	26	(6)
2019–2020	Harelbeke	13	(2)
2020–2022	KSCT Menen	14	(3)
2022	Roeselare-Daisel		
2023–2025	SV Wevelgem City		
2025–	KWS Houthulst		
- * Club domestic league appearances and goals as of 21 January 2026

Gregory Mahau (born 9 May 1994) is a Belgian professional footballer who plays as a winger for KWS Houthulst.

== Career ==
=== Club career ===
Mahau is a youth product of KV Kortrijk. He made his professional debut for Kortrijk on 13 April 2013 in the Jupiler Pro League. Besides a loan spell at Coxyde in the 2015–16 season, Mahau managed to play 20 games for Kortrijk before his departure at the end of August 2016.

On 31 August 2016 Mahau moved to KVC Winkel Sport. After one season, he moved to Londerzeel. Ahead of the 2018–19 season, he joined KSCT Menen. In the 2019–20 season, he played for KRC Harelbeke.

In the summer 2020, Mahau returned to his former club, KSCT Menen. After two seasons, Mahai joined Roeselare-Daisel ahead of the 2022–23 season. But back in early August, it emerged that there had been a disagreement between Mahau and several teammates at an event. In the wake of this, the club decided to stop working with Mahau.

In May 2023 it was confirmed, that Mahau had signed with Wevelgem City.
