= Emile Samyn =

Belgian footballer

Personal information
- Full name: Emile Hugo Samyn
- Date of birth: 28 April 1997 (age 29)
- Place of birth: Belgium
- Position: Winger

Team information
- Current team: Roeselare
- Number: 7

Youth career
- –2015: KSV Roeselare

Senior career*
Years	Team	Apps	(Gls)
2015–2020	KSV Roeselare	67	(5)
2019–2020	→ Lierse (loan)	10	(3)
2020–2021	Lierse	28	(3)
2021–2023	Knokke	58	(8)
2023–2025	Harelbeke	49	(13)
2025–	Roeselare	28	(3)
- * Club domestic league appearances and goals as of 3 May 2026

Emile Hugo Samyn (born 28 April 1997) is a Belgian footballer who plays as a winger for Roeselare.

== Career ==
Samyn is a product of Roeselare. On 2 September 2019 it was confirmed, that Samyn had been loaned out to Belgian First Amateur Division club Lierse Kempenzonen for the rest of the season.

On 14 April 2021, he agreed to join Knokke.
