= Fries Deschilder =

Belgian footballer (born 1992)

Personal information
- Full name: Fries Dirk Deschilder
- Date of birth: 15 September 1992 (age 34)
- Place of birth: Ypres, Belgium
- Height: 1.81 m (5 ft 11 in)
- Position: Midfielder

Team information
- Current team: Roeselare
- Number: 26

Youth career
- 1997–2004: FC Westouter
- 2004–2006: Roeselare
- 2006–2011: Club Brugge

Senior career*
Years	Team	Apps	(Gls)
2011–2013	Club Brugge	3	(0)
2012–2013	→ Eindhoven (loan)	19	(1)
2013–2018	Eindhoven	141	(18)
2018–2024	Sint-Eloois-Winkel	121	(6)
2024–	Roeselare	57	(4)

International career
2009–2010	Belgium U18	1	(0)
- * Club domestic league appearances and goals as of 3 May 2026

Fries Dirk Deschilder (born 15 September 1992) is a Belgian professional footballer who plays as a midfielder for Roeselare.

== Career ==
=== Club Brugge ===
Deschilder joined Club Brugge at the age of 14 and progressed through the ranks at the club's youth level and in 2011, he signed a professional contract for three-years set to expire on 30 June 2014. He made his debut for Brugge in a 5–0 win against Westerlo coming on a substitute in 85th minute coming on for Niki Zimling. His second appearance came in the 1–1 draw against Zulte-Waregem when he came on in the 32nd minute replacing Víctor Vázquez. His last appearance of the 2011–12 season came in the 1–1 draw against Beerschot, where he came on as a substitute yet again this time coming on for Lior Refaelov in the 85th minute. Eighteen days later, Deschilder got his first experience of European football against Birmingham City in the Europa League (2–1 defeat), coming on as a substitute in the 82nd minute replacing Jonathan Blondel.

=== Eindhoven ===
In August 2012, Deschilder joined Dutch side FC Eindhoven on a season-long loan. He made his official debut for the club in the 1–0 loss against Veendam, coming on during the 46th minute for Rob van Boekel. On the third matchday he was allowed to come on again, this time in the 70th minute against Cambuur. It took until the end of September before he was allowed to make an appearance again, this time in the KNVB Cup against JVC Cuijk, where he came on in the 75th minute. On 23 November 2011, he made his first start, and also received his first yellow card for the club. Two weeks later he made another start against AGOVV. Already after 12 minutes he scored in that match and thus scored the first goal of his professional career, although the match ended in a humiliating 1–6 defeat. The following week he was also in the starting line-up and played his first full match for the team.

=== Sint-Eloois-Winkel ===
In July 2018, Deschilder signed with Sint-Eloois-Winkel Sport in the fourth-tier Belgian Second Amateur Division.

== International ==
Deschilder has been capped at Belgium U18 level.
