= Junior Dutra =

Brazilian footballer

Júnior Dutra
Personal information
- Full name: Sérgio Dutra Júnior
- Date of birth: 25 April 1988 (age 38)
- Place of birth: Santos, Brazil
- Height: 1.88 m (6 ft 2 in)
- Position: Forward

Team information
- Current team: Figueirense

Youth career
- 1998–2003: Santos
- 2003–2006: Atlético Paranaense
- 2006–2008: Santo André

Senior career*
Years	Team	Apps	(Gls)
2008–2009	Santo André	31	(2)
2010–2012	Kyoto Sanga FC	56	(11)
2012	Kashima Antlers	27	(8)
2013–2015	Lokeren	63	(11)
2015–2016	Al-Arabi	22	(11)
2016	Vasco da Gama	12	(1)
2017	Avaí	30	(9)
2018–2019	Corinthians	5	(0)
2018	→ Fluminense (loan)	14	(0)
2019	→ Al-Nasr (loan)	15	(3)
2019–2020	Shimizu S-Pulse	39	(10)
2021	Avaí	16	(3)
2021–2022	Lee Man	3	(2)
2023	Londrina	6	(0)
2023–	Figueirense	3	(0)
- * Club domestic league appearances and goals as of 26 August 2023

Sérgio Dutra Júnior (born 25 April 1988), known as Júnior Dutra, is a Brazilian professional footballer who plays for Figueirense. Mainly plays as a winger, he can also play as an attacking midfielder or a forward.

== Club career ==
Born in Santos, São Paulo, Júnior Dutra joined Santos FC's youth setup in 1998 at the age of ten. Released in 2003, he had a three-year spell at Atlético Paranaense before joining Santo André.

Júnior Dutra made his senior debut on 30 May 2008, coming on as a second-half substitute in a 0–0 Campeonato Paulista Série A2 away draw against Oeste; it was also the tournament's final. His professional debut occurred on 8 August, starting in a 3–2 home win against Ceará for the Série B championship.

Júnior Dutra contributed with seven appearances, as his side achieved promotion to Série A after finishing second. He scored his first professional goal on 1 February 2009, netting the first in a 2–0 away win against São Paulo.

Júnior Dutra made his top flight debut on 4 June 2009, starting in a 3–3 home draw against former side Santos. He scored his first goal in the category on 19 August, netting the first in a 2–1 success at Botafogo.

After scoring two goals in 24 league matches, Júnior Dutra moved abroad and joined J1 League side Kyoto Sanga FC, for a fee of R$8 million. An undisputed starter, he suffered relegation with the club during his first season.

In 2012 Júnior Dutra signed for Kashima Antlers, again being an ever-present figure and scoring a career-best eight goals during the campaign, also being crowned champions of the year's J.League Cup. On 10 January 2013 he moved to Europe, after agreeing to an 18-month contract with Lokeren in the Belgian Pro League.

In February 2015 Júnior Dutra switched teams and countries again, after signing for Qatar Stars League side Al-Arabi. On 28 February he scored a hat-trick in a 4–4 away draw against Al Kharaitiyat, and roughly a month later he scored the league's fastest goal by netting in the tenth second in a 1–3 loss at Lekhwiya.

In March 2016 Júnior Dutra rescinded with Al-Arabi, after having unpaid wages. He subsequently represented Vasco da Gama and Avaí back in his homeland.

He joined Corinthians in 2018.

On 5 November 2021, Dutra joined Lee Man. He left the club on 30 June 2022 after he finished his contract with the club.

== Club statistics ==
As of 11 October 2017

Club	Season	League			State League		Cup		Continental		Other		Total	
Club	Season	Division	Apps	Goals	Apps	Goals	Apps	Goals	Apps	Goals	Apps	Goals	Apps	Goals
Santo André	2008	Série B	7	0	1	0	—		—		18 (Note: All appearance(s) in Copa Paulista)	3	26	3
Santo André	2009	Série A	24	2	13	4	—		—		—		37	6
Santo André	Subtotal		31	2	14	4	0	0	0	0	18	3	63	9
Kyoto Sanga FC	2010	J1 League	26	5	—		4	1	—		2 (Note: All appearance(s) in Emperor's Cup)	0	32	6
Kyoto Sanga FC	2011	J2 League	30	6	—		0	0	—		6	2	36	8
Kyoto Sanga FC	Subtotal		56	11	—		4	1	0	0	8	2	68	14
Kashima Antlers	2012	J1 League	27	8	—		9	2	1 (Note: All appearance(s) in Suruga Bank Championship)	0	5	1	42	11
Lokeren	2012–13	Pro League	15	1	—		—		—		—		15	1
Lokeren	2013–14	Pro League	36	5	—		7	3	—		—		43	8
Lokeren	2014–15	Pro League	12	5	—		2	1	6 (Note: All appearance(s) in UEFA Europa League)	0	1 (Note: All appearance(s) in Belgian Super Cup)	0	21	6
Lokeren	Subtotal		63	11	—		9	4	6	0	1	0	79	15
Al-Arabi	2014–15	Qatar Stars League	9	6	—		—		—		—		9	6
Al-Arabi	2015–16	Qatar Stars League	13	5	—		—		—		—		13	5
Al-Arabi	Subtotal		22	11	—		—		—		—		22	11
Vasco da Gama	2016	Série B	12	1	—		1	0	—		—		13	1
Avaí	2017	Série A	30	9	18	6	2	1	—		2 (Note: All appearance(s) in Primeira Liga)	0	43	13
Career total			232	50	28	10	25	8	7	0	35	6	326	74

== Honours ==
Lokeren

- Belgian Cup: 2013–14

Corinthians

- Campeonato Paulista: 2018

Avaí

- Campeonato Catarinense: 2021
