= Théo Defourny =

Belgian footballer

Personal information
- Date of birth: 15 April 1992 (age 34)
- Place of birth: Bourg-Saint-Maurice, France
- Height: 1.94 m (6 ft 4 in)
- Position: Goalkeeper

Team information
- Current team: RWDM
- Number: 33

Youth career
- 2004–2011: Lyon

Senior career*
Years	Team	Apps	(Gls)
2011–2014	Lyon II	3	(0)
2011–2012	→ Antwerp (loan)	26	(0)
2012–2013	→ Rouen (loan)	14	(0)
2014–2015	Virton	21	(0)
2015–2017	Mouscron	6	(0)
2017–2019	Tubize	65	(0)
2019–2020	Lokeren	9	(0)
2020–2021	Eupen	21	(0)
2021–2024	RWDM	92	(0)
2024–2026	Charleroi	1	(0)
2026–	RWDM	0	(0)

International career^{‡}
2009–2010	Belgium U18	3	(0)
2012	Belgium U20	1	(0)
2013	Belgium U21	1	(0)
- * Club domestic league appearances and goals as of 4 August 2026 ‡ National team caps and goals as of 6 June 2013

Théo Defourny (born 15 April 1992) is a Belgian professional footballer who plays as a goalkeeper for RWDM in the Belgian First Amateur Division.

== Career ==
=== Lyon ===
Defourny played in the youth academy of French club Lyon since he was 12 years old. In the summer of 2011, Premier League club Manchester United offered to sign him for €1 million, but Lyon rejected the bid. He was loaned out to the Belgian second division Antwerp for one year in the 2011–12 season. He made 27 appearances there. In the 2012–13 season, he was loaned for one year to the French third division club Rouen. He made 14 appearances for the club. From the 2013–14 season, he was part of the first-team squad of Lyon, where he had to compete with Rémy Vercoutre, Anthony Lopes and Mathieu Gorgelin. Defourny, however, failed to break through in the main squad of the French top club: he only played for the reserve team of the club in the CFA that season.

=== Belgium ===
In 2014, Defourny left Lyon for Belgian second division team Virton. After one season he was picked up by first division Mouscron-Péruwelz, but there he was the backup to first Vagner and since Matej Delač. After two seasons as reserve goalkeeper, Defourny moved Tubize, where he once again became the starter after the departure of Quentin Beunardeau. Despite Defourny's strong performances, Tubize finished last in the competition twice. In 2018, the club was still administratively able to save itself due to the bankruptcy of Lierse, but in 2019 Tubize relegated to the Belgian First Amateur Division. Defourny nevertheless made the Proximus League Team of the Season.

Defourny was signed by Lokeren in July 2019, where he succeeded Ortwin De Wolf. There he had to deal with competition from Davino Verhulst. When Verhulst was sidelined in January 2020 due to private problems, Defourny took his place.

After the club went bankrupt at the end of the season, he moved to Eupen. There he started as the backup to Ortwin De Wolf, but when he was injured in the league match against Sporting Charleroi at the end of November, Defourny took his place. He stayed on as the starting goalkeeper – until final matchday of the season, against Charleroi, where Robin Himmelmann got the start.

In July 2021, Defourny signed a three-year contract with Belgian First Division B club RWDM.

On 16 June 2024, Defourny agreed to move to Charleroi on a three-year deal. That didn't work out very well because of an injury and in the summer of 2026 he left the club.

On 4 August 2026 he joined his former club RWDM. The club had just been relegated to the Belgian First Amateur Division but he joined them because Thierry Dailly was the new boss of the club and he wanted to help RWDM once again. The fans were very happy with that because he was their first-choice goalkeeper during their adventure in the Jupiler Pro League in the 2023–24 season.
