= Emir Dautović =

Slovenian footballer (born 1995)

Personal information
- Full name: Emir Dautović
- Date of birth: 5 February 1995 (age 31)
- Place of birth: Trbovlje, Slovenia
- Height: 1.94 m (6 ft 4 in)
- Position: Centre-back

Team information
- Current team: SV Flavia Solva

Youth career
- 2001–2010: Rudar Trbovlje
- 2010–2014: Maribor

Senior career*
Years	Team	Apps	(Gls)
2014–2015	OFK Beograd	13	(0)
2015–2016	Apollon Limassol	0	(0)
2015–2016	→ Mouscron-Péruwelz (loan)	2	(0)
2016	→ OFK Beograd (loan)	0	(0)
2016–2017	Fortuna Sittard	8	(0)
2017	Ankaran Hrvatini	5	(0)
2018	Radomlje	13	(0)
2018–2021	SC Kalsdorf	52	(4)
2021–2024	SV Tillmitsch	53	(7)
2024-	SV Flavia Solva		

International career^{‡}
2012	Slovenia U17 (Note: Official UEFA matches only.)	3	(0)
- * Club domestic league appearances and goals as of 3 September 2023 ‡ National team caps and goals as of 1 July 2020

Emir Dautović (born 5 February 1995) is a Slovenian football defender who plays for SV Flavia Solva in Austria.

== Club career ==
He began his career in Trbovlje, where he played for Rudar Trbovlje youth selections until 2010, when he transferred to Maribor. Dautović, who plays as a central defender, was regarded as one of the biggest talents of the Slovenian football in 2012. He made his professional debut for OFK Beograd in Jelen SuperLiga home win against Mladost Lučani on 23 November 2014.

He moved abroad again to play in the Austrian lower leagues in 2018.

== International career ==
Dautović was a member of the Slovenia national under-19 football team. He appeared with the under-17 squad at the 2012 UEFA European Under-17 Football Championship, where he played on all three group matches for his side, receiving one red card in the process.
