= Merveille (beignet) =

Pastry

Merveilles are a kind of beignet typical of the Atlantic coast of South West France; Gascony, Bordelais, Charentes, Périgord as well as the Vallée d'Aoste and Suisse romande. They are also known in New Orleans. They are a twisted raised pastry similar to the Lyon bugnes, and resembling a Pennsylvania fastnacht. Merveilles are typically fried in duck fat.
