= Willem Ofori-Appiah =

Belgian footballer

Personal information
- Full name: Marvin Willem Ofori Appiah
- Date of birth: 19 February 1994 (age 32)
- Place of birth: Heusden-Zolder, Belgium
- Height: 1.74 m (5 ft 9 in)
- Position: Left-back

Team information
- Current team: KEWS Schoonbeek-Beverst
- Number: 8

Youth career
- –2011: Genk

Senior career*
Years	Team	Apps	(Gls)
2011–2015	Genk	0	(0)
2014	→ Dessel Sport (loan)	7	(0)
2014–2015	→ MVV (loan)	15	(0)
2015–2016	Roda JC	1	(0)
2016–2018	Dessel Sport	45	(0)
2018–2020	Sporting Hasselt	13	(2)
2021–2022	Saint-Jean Beaulieu FC	2	(0)
2022–2023	Sporting Hasselt	31	(2)
2023–2025	KVK Beringen		
2025–	KEWS Schoonbeek-Beverst	0	(0)

International career
2009–2010	Belgium U16	8	(0)
2010–2011	Belgium U17	15	(2)
2011	Belgium U18	2	(0)
- * Club domestic league appearances and goals as of 16 January 2026

Marvin Willem Ofori Appiah (born 19 February 1994) is a Belgian footballer who plays as a left back for KEWS Schoonbeek-Beverst.

== Club career ==
=== KRC Genk ===
Ofori-Appiah played in the youth setup of KRC Genk until 2014. On 31 January 2014, the last day of the winter transfer period he was loaned to Dessel Sport. He made his debut for Dessel on 8 March 2014 in the match against VC Westerlo, Ofori-Appiah played the whole game. He would eventually play in 7 games of the 2014–15 season. He went on to join MVV Maastricht on loan and eventually played 15 times before being released by Genk upon his return.

=== Roda JC ===
He signed for Eredivisie side Roda JC in the summer of 2016 and on 28 November 2015 he made his debut in a 3–0 defeat against SC Heerenveen.

On 27 July 2017 he joined English League Two side Grimsby Town on trial.

== Statistics ==
Season	Country	Club	League	League		Europe		Cup		Total	
Season	Country	Club	League	Apps	Goals	Apps	Goals	Apps	Goals	Apps	Goals
2013–2014	Belgium	KRC Genk	Jupiler Pro League	0	0	0	0	0	0	0	0
2013–2014	→ Belgium	KFC Dessel Sport	Belgian Second Division	7	0	0	0	0	0	7	0
2014–2015	→ Netherlands	MVV Maastricht	Eerste Divisie	15	0	0	0	1	0	15	0
2015–2016	Netherlands	Roda JC Kerkrade	Eredivisie	1	0	0	0	0	0	1	0
Career total				23	0	0	0	1	0	24	0
