= Thibaut Rausin =

Belgian footballer

Personal information
- Full name: Thibaut Manuel Rausin
- Date of birth: 3 May 1993 (age 33)
- Place of birth: Belgium
- Height: 1.93 m (6 ft 4 in)
- Position: Goalkeeper

Team information
- Current team: KEWS Schoonbeek-Beverst
- Number: 1

Youth career
- –2011: Standard Liège
- 2011–2012: Eupen

Senior career*
Years	Team	Apps	(Gls)
2012–2014	CS Visé	25	(0)
2014–2015	Westerlo	1	(0)
2015–2016	Mouscron	0	(0)
2016–2018	Tubize	6	(0)
2018	Rupel Boom	6	(0)
2019–2020	Lierse	40	(0)
2021	MVV	0	(0)
2021–2025	RRC Hamoir	91	(1)
2025–	KEWS Schoonbeek-Beverst	0	(0)
- * Club domestic league appearances and goals as of 06:45, 16 January 2026 (UTC)

Thibaut Manuel Rausin (born 3 May 1993) is a Belgian professional footballer who plays as a goalkeeper for KEWS Schoonbeek-Beverst.
