= Jens Naessens =

Belgian footballer (born 1991)

Personal information
- Date of birth: 1 April 1991 (age 35)
- Place of birth: Deinze, Belgium
- Height: 1.87 m (6 ft 2 in)
- Position: Forward

Team information
- Current team: Roeselare
- Number: 24

Senior career*
Years	Team	Apps	(Gls)
2009–2014	Zulte Waregem	95	(19)
2014–2017	Mechelen	39	(4)
2016	→ Antwerp (loan)	6	(0)
2016–2017	→ Zulte Waregem (loan)	11	(1)
2017–2019	Westerlo	48	(15)
2019–2020	Roeselare	17	(5)
2020	Foggia	3	(0)
2021–2023	Lierse	36	(3)
2023–2024	Knokke	26	(9)
2024–	Roeselare	29	(16)

International career
2011–2013	Belgium U21	4	(1)
- * Club domestic league appearances and goals as of 4 February 2026

Jens Naessens (born 1 April 1991) is a Belgian professional footballer who plays as a forward for Roeselare.

== Club career ==
On 10 October 2020, he joined Italian Serie C club Foggia. On 4 November 2020 in a game against Casertana, he ruptured his achilles tendon.

His contract was terminated on 1 December 2020. Five months later he signed a one-year contract with Lierse Kempenzonen.

On 27 June 2023, Royal Knokke F.C. announced the signing of Naessens, on a two-year contract.
