= Jore Trompet =

Belgian footballer

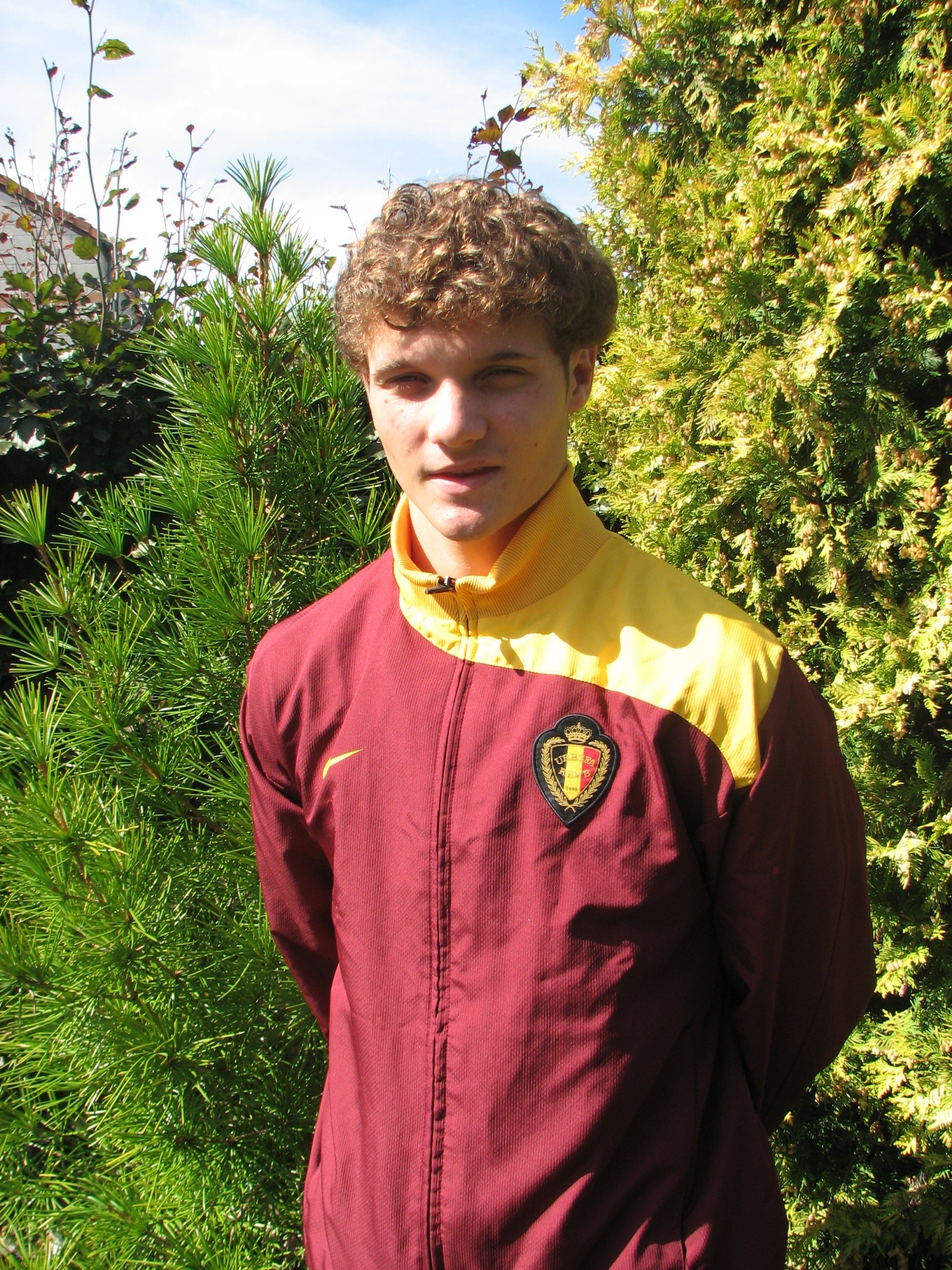

Personal information
- Date of birth: 30 July 1992 (age 34)
- Place of birth: Brussels, Belgium
- Height: 1.80 m (5 ft 11 in)
- Position: Attacking midfielder

Team information
- Current team: KSV Temse

Senior career*
Years	Team	Apps	(Gls)
2009–2015	Lokeren	39	(0)
2015–2017	Westerlo	1	(0)
2016	→ Eendracht Aalst (loan)	11	(0)
2016–2017	→ Rupel Boom (loan)	18	(0)
2017–	KSV Temse	0	(0)

International career
2010	Belgium U18	6	(0)
2010–2011	Belgium U19	18	(2)
2012	Belgium U20	2	(0)
- * Club domestic league appearances and goals as of 22 July 2017 (UTC)

Jore Trompet (born 30 July 1992) is a Belgian footballer who currently plays for KSV Temse.

== Honours ==
Lokeren

- Belgian Cup: 2013–14
