= Albian Muzaqi =

German footballer

Personal information
- Full name: Albian Muzaqi Mustafa
- Date of birth: 24 November 1994 (age 31)
- Place of birth: Ellwangen, Germany
- Height: 1.92 m (6 ft 4 in)
- Position: Forward

Youth career
- –2004: GRC Groningen
- 2004–2007: FC Groningen
- 2007–2013: PSV

Senior career*
Years	Team	Apps	(Gls)
2012–2013	PSV	0	(0)
2012–2013	→ FC Eindhoven (loan)	1	(0)
2013–2017	Genk	1	(0)
2015	→ Cercle Brugge (loan)	5	(0)
2015–2016	→ ASV Geel (loan)	9	(0)
2018–2019	Helmond Sport	14	(0)
- * Club domestic league appearances and goals as of 12 May 2019

Albian Muzaqi Mustafa (born 24 November 1994) is a German professional footballer who plays as a forward, most recently for Helmond Sport.

== Club career ==
Muzaqi spent his youth career with CRC Groningen, FC Groningen and PSV Eindhoven. In 2013, he joined Belgian side KRC Genk on a free transfer. Muzaqi made his debut for KRC Genk at 12 December 2013 in a UEFA Europa League fixture against FC Thun. He replaced Jelle Vossen in the second half, who scored the only goal of the game.

After spending the 2017–18 season without a club, he signed with the Eerste Divisie club Helmond Sport on 31 August 2018.
