= Fabien Boyer =

Footballer (born 1991)

Personal information
- Full name: Fabien Boyer
- Date of birth: 12 April 1991 (age 35)
- Place of birth: Vienne, France
- Height: 1.87 m (6 ft 2 in)
- Position: Centre-back

Team information
- Current team: JS Saint-Pierroise

Youth career
- 1998–2005: Lyon
- 2005–2006: Villefranche
- 2006–2007: Louhans-Cuiseaux
- 2007–2008: Toulouse
- 2008–2010: Monaco

Senior career*
Years	Team	Apps	(Gls)
2010–2011	Jura Sud	19	(1)
2011–2012	Rennes B	20	(2)
2012–2015	Angers	37	(0)
2014–2015	→ Châteauroux (loan)	22	(1)
2015–2017	K.V. Kortrijk	14	(0)
2017–2018	US Créteil	25	(1)
2018–2019	Grenoble	1	(0)
2020–2021	Annecy	0	(0)
2021	AS Excelsior		
2022–	JS Saint-Pierroise		

International career^{‡}
2017–	Madagascar	3	(0)
- * Club domestic league appearances and goals as of 13:21, 18 February 2021 (UTC) ‡ National team caps and goals as of 7 June 2019

Fabien Boyer (born 12 April 1991) is a professional footballer who plays as a centre-back for JS Saint-Pierroise in the Réunion Island. Born in France, he plays for the Madagascar national team at international level.

== Club career ==
Boyer started his career with Jura Sud, where he made 19 league appearances during the 2010–11 season. In the summer of 2011, he joined Rennes' reserve team and played 20 matches in the CFA 2, before moving to Angers ahead of the 2012–13 campaign. He made his professional debut in the 1–0 win over Sedan on 27 July 2012.

On 17 July 2018, Boyer suffered a cruciate ligament rupture in a pre-season friendly for Grenoble against Annecy, which restricted him to playing only one match for the rest of the season.

After being without a club for almost a year, Boyer signed for Annecy on 12 June 2020, who had recently been promoted to the Championnat National, the third division of France. His contract was terminated in February 2021, without playing a game for Annecy. Later in the same month, Boyer moved to the Réunion Island and joined AS Excelsior. He played there for a few months, before joining fellow league club JS Saint-Pierroise in the beginning of 2022.

== International career ==
Boyer was born in France and is Malagasy by descent. He made his debut for the Madagascar national team in a 1–1 friendly tie with Comoros on 11 November 2017.

== Honours ==
Madagascar

- Indian Ocean Island Games Gold medal: 2023
