= Senne Vits =

Belgian footballer (born 1996)

Personal information
- Date of birth: 31 August 1996 (age 30)
- Place of birth: Leuven, Belgium
- Height: 1.89 m (6 ft 2 in)
- Position: Goalkeeper

Team information
- Current team: FF Jaro
- Number: 1

Senior career*
Years	Team	Apps	(Gls)
2013–2015	Oud-Heverlee Leuven	0	(0)
2015–2017	Standard Liège	0	(0)
2017	→ MVV Maastricht (loan)	0	(0)
2017–2018	Sporting Hasselt		
2018–2019	Lierse SK	4	(0)
2019–2020	Helmond Sport	0	(0)
2020–2021	RCS Brainois		
2021–2022	FC Victoria Rosport	17	(0)
2022	K. Rupel Boom FC	12	(0)
2023	Dalkurd FF	29	(0)
2024	Vasalund IF	29	(0)
2025	Strømmen IF	26	(0)
2026–	FF Jaro	27	(0)

International career^{‡}
2012	Belgium U16	2	(0)
2013	Belgium U18	1	(0)
2015	Belgium U19	2	(0)
- * Club domestic league appearances and goals as of 13 November 2026 ‡ National team caps and goals as of 31 March 2015

Senne Vits (born 31 August 1996) is a Belgian professional footballer who plays as a goalkeeper for FF Jaro.

== Early life ==
Vits was born on 31 August 1996. Born in Leuven, Belgium, he is a native of the city.

== Club career ==
As a youth player, Vits joined the youth academy of Belgian side OH Leuven and was promoted to the club's senior team in 2013, where he made zero league appearances. Six years later, he signed for Dutch side Helmond Sport, where he made zero league appearances. Following his stint there, he signed for Luxembourgian side FC Victoria Rosport in 2021, where he made seventeen league appearances.

Six months layer, he signed for Swedish side Dalkurd FF, where he made twenty-nine league appearances. Subsequently, he signed for Norwegian side Strømmen IF in 2025, where he made twenty-six league appearances and helped the club achieve promotion from the third tier to the second tier. Ahead of the 2026 season, he signed for Finnish side FF Jaro.

== International career ==
Vits is a Belgium youth international. During the spring of 2015, he played for the Belgium national under-19 football team for 2015 UEFA European Under-19 Championship qualification.
