= Jonathan Wilmet =

Belgian footballer

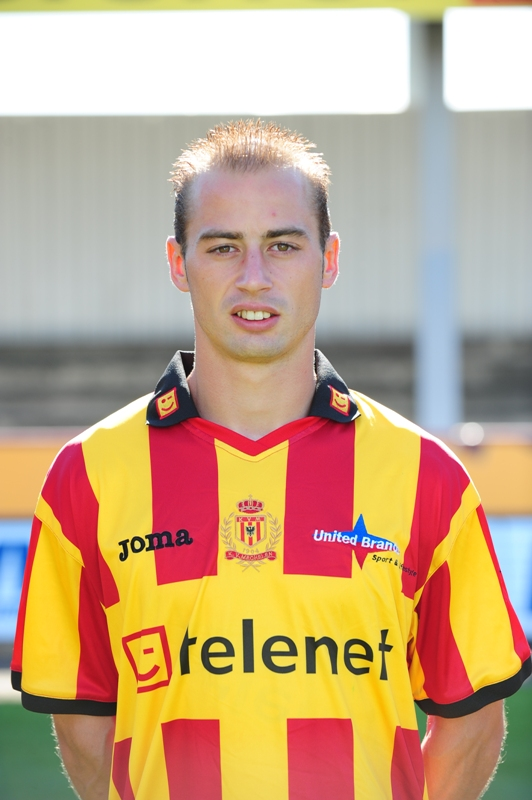
- Wilmet in 2010

Personal information
- Full name: Jonathan Wilmet
- Date of birth: 7 January 1986 (age 40)
- Place of birth: Ottignies-Louvain-la-Neuve, Belgium
- Height: 1.82 m (6 ft 0 in)
- Position: Midfielder

Youth career
- RWD Molenbeek
- Lens
- Nottingham Forest

Senior career*
Years	Team	Apps	(Gls)
2005–2008	Willem II	25	(0)
2008–2010	Sint-Truiden	82	(18)
2010–2012	Mechelen	34	(3)
2012–2013	Westerlo	0	(0)
2013–2015	Oostende	15	(3)
2015	→ Waasland-Beveren (loan)	11	(0)
2015–2016	Waasland-Beveren	0	(0)
2015–2016	→ Deinze (loan)	22	(1)
2016–2017	Wallonia Walhain		
- * Club domestic league appearances and goals

Jonathan Wilmet (born 7 January 1986) is a Belgian former professional footballer who played as a midfielder.

== Career ==
Wilmet made his debut in professional football as a part of the Willem II squad in the 2005–06 season. In 2008, he moved to Sint-Truiden in the Belgian Second Division, enjoying promotion in his first season. He played one more season with Sint-Truiden at the highest level before moving to Mechelen where he played from 2010 to 2012. In 2012, he moved back to the Second Division as he signed with Westerlo, before joining Oostende the following year.

In January 2015, Wilmet was loaned out to Waasland-Beveren for six months, with an option on a permanent contract for two seasons. The option was exercised, but in August, Wilmet was loaned out to Belgian Second Division club Deinze for a year. Wilmet then played for another year for lower-tier side Wallonia Walhain, and retired from football afterwards.
