= Joey Dujardin =

Belgian footballer (born 1996)

Personal information
- Full name: Joey Edouard Dujardin
- Date of birth: 16 February 1996 (age 30)
- Place of birth: Mouscron, Belgium
- Height: 1.80 m (5 ft 11 in)
- Position: Centre-back

Team information
- Current team: Roeselare
- Number: 96

Youth career
- Excelsior Mouscron
- 2014–2015: Zulte-Waregem

Senior career*
Years	Team	Apps	(Gls)
2015	Zulte-Waregem	2	(0)
2015–2017	Lokeren	0	(0)
2016–2017	→ Hamme (loan)	26	(0)
2017–2018	Hamme	28	(0)
2018–2024	Sint-Eloois-Winkel	143	(3)
2024–	Roeselare	57	(0)

International career
2012	Belgium U16	3	(0)
2012	Belgium U17	2	(0)
2013–2014	Belgium U18	8	(0)
2014–2015	Belgium U19	8	(0)
- * Club domestic league appearances and goals as of 3 May 2026

Joey Edouard Dujardin (born 16 February 1996) is a Belgian professional footballer who plays as a centre back for Roeselare.

== Career ==
Dujardin played youth football for Excelsior Mouscron and Zulte-Waregem. On 28 February 2015 he sat on the bench for the first time in the league match against Mechelen. On 15 March 2015, he was allowed to make his debut in the starting eleven against Oostende on the last day of the 2014–15 regular season. With a 0–2 deficit at half-time, Francky Dury decided to replace Dujardin for midfielder Mohamed Messoudi. The game eventually ended 1–4 in favour of the visitors.

In the summer of 2015, Dujardin moved from Zulte Waregem to Lokeren, where he failed to make a first-team appearance. He was then loaned to Hamme in 2016, and joined them permanently the following year. He moved to Sint-Eloois-Winkel in July 2018.
