= Fabien Antunes =

French footballer (born 1991)

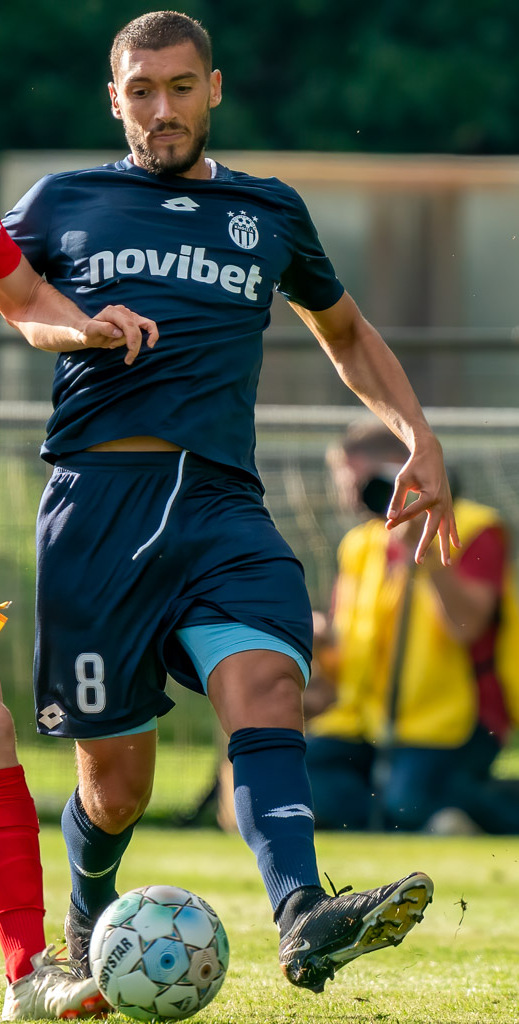

Personal information
- Date of birth: 19 November 1991 (age 34)
- Place of birth: Paris, France
- Height: 1.83 m (6 ft 0 in)
- Positions: Midfielder; defender

Team information
- Current team: A.E. Kifisia
- Number: 8

Senior career*
Years	Team	Apps	(Gls)
2010–2013	JA Drancy	50	(3)
2013–2014	Red Star FC	13	(0)
2014–2015	RE Virton	33	(2)
2015–2017	KV Oostende	24	(0)
2017–2019	Sint-Truiden	11	(0)
2018–2019	→ Westerlo (loan)	17	(1)
2019–2021	Westerlo	28	(1)
2021–2022	Panetolikos	28	(0)
2022–2023	Ionikos	18	(0)
2023–	A.E. Kifisia	5	(0)
- * Club domestic league appearances and goals as of 8 January 2024

Fabien Antunes (born 19 November 1991) is a French professional footballer who plays as a midfielder for Greek Super League club A.E. Kifisia.

== Personal life ==
Antunes is of Portuguese descent.

== Career statistics ==
As of match played on 24 February 2018

Appearances and goals by club, season and competition
Club	Season	League			Cup		Other		Total	
Club	Season	Division	Apps	Goals	Apps	Goals	Apps	Goals	Apps	Goals
JA Drancy	2010–11	CFA	5	0	0	0	0	0	5	0
JA Drancy	2011–12	CFA	22	1	0	0	0	0	22	1
JA Drancy	2012–13	CFA	23	2	0	0	0	0	23	2
JA Drancy	Total		50	3	0	0	0	0	50	3
Red Star	2013–14	Championnat National	13	0	0	0	0	0	13	0
Virton	2014–15	Belgian Second Division	33	2	0	0	0	0	33	2
K.V. Oostende	2015–16	Belgian Pro League	7	0	1	0	0	0	8	0
K.V. Oostende	2016–17	Belgian First Division A	17	0	1	0	0	0	18	0
K.V. Oostende	Total		24	0	2	0	0	0	26	0
Sint-Truiden	2017–18	Belgian First Division A	11	0	2	0	0	0	13	0
Career total			131	5	4	0	0	0	135	5
