= SK Roeselare =

Belgian football club

Roeselare
- Full name: Sportkring Roeselare
- Founded: 1975; 51 years ago (creation); 2021; 5 years ago (merger)
- Ground: Schiervelde Stadion, Roeselare
- Capacity: 8,340
- Chairman: Alexander Verduyn
- League: Belgian Division 1
- 2025–26: Belgian Division 1 VV, 3rd of 18
Home colours

Sportkring Roeselare, abbreviated to SK Roeselare, also known in French as SK Roulers, is a Belgian football club from the city of Roeselare in West Flanders. The club currently play in Belgian Division 1, the third tier of Belgian football. Its matricule is 8264 and club has black and white as club colours.

== History ==
In 1975, VK Dadizele joined the Belgian FA, receiving matricule 8264. The club never left the Belgian Provincial Leagues, but almost gained promotion to the national level in 2019 via the promotion playoffs.

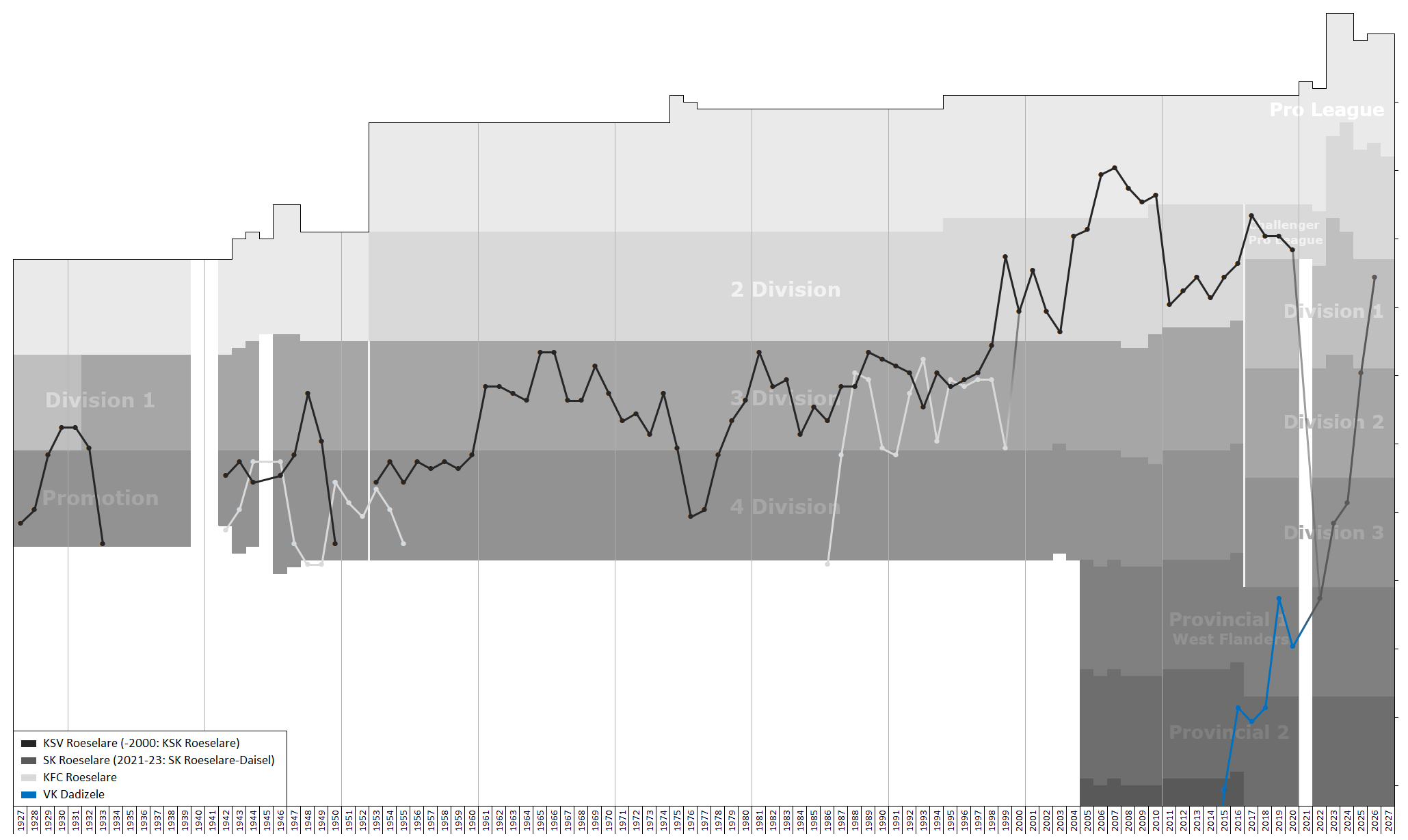
Historical league performance chart of SK Roeselare and its predecessors

In 2021, the club merged with KSV Roeselare, which had just gone bankrupt while playing in the Belgian National Division 1 (third level). The club continued as SK Roeselare-Daisel using the matricule of VK Dadizele and continuing from the level of Dadizele (at that time the sixth level (First Provincial Division West-Flanders)). In its first season, the club was immediately promoted to the national leagues after finishing second.

In 2023, the name was changed to SK Roeselare and at the end of the season after finishing 4th, the club promoted to Belgian Division 2 via end of season promotion playoffs.

In 2024–25, Roeselare secure promotion to Belgian Division 1 from next season.

== Current squad ==
As of 1 March 2026

Note: Flags indicate national team as defined under FIFA eligibility rules; some limited exceptions apply. Players may hold more than one non-FIFA nationality.

No.	Pos.	Nation	Player
1	GK	BEL	Bas Merci
4	DF	BEL	Robbe Decostere
5	DF	BEL	Rens Verhooghe
7	FW	BEL	Emile Samyn
10	MF	BEL	Daan Debouver
14	DF	BEL	Henri Van Marcke
16	MF	BEL	Rune Libbrecht
17	MF	BEL	Jelco Schamp
18	FW	BEL	Kyan Himpe (on loan from Kortrijk)
19	FW	BEL	Jasper Beyens
20	MF	BEL	Justin Hallaert

No.	Pos.	Nation	Player
21	GK	BEL	Jarne Demeyere
22	FW	BEL	Michiel Clyncke
24	FW	BEL	Jens Naessens
26	MF	BEL	Fries Deschilder
28	DF	BEL	Arthur Harinck
29	DF	BEL	Gilles Degryse
72	DF	BEL	Stephan Rekhov
75	DF	BEL	Arne De Schepper
77	GK	BEL	Leandro Depaepe
96	DF	BEL	Joey Dujardin
