= Abdul-Yakuni Iddi =

Ghanaian footballer (born 1986)

Abdul Iddi
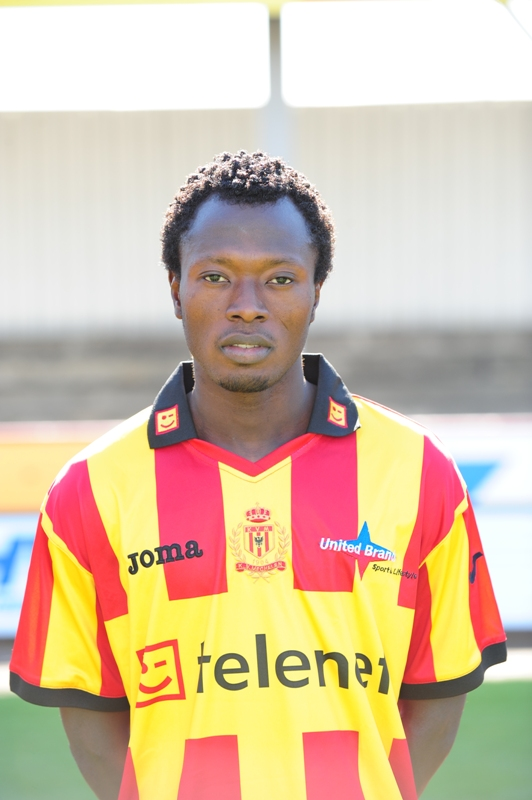

Personal information
- Full name: Abdul-Yakuni Iddi
- Date of birth: June 25, 1986 (age 40)
- Place of birth: Salaga, Ghana
- Height: 1.75 m (5 ft 9 in)
- Position: Midfielder

Team information
- Current team: Malderen

Youth career
- Feyenoord Academy
- –2007: Jong Feyenoord

Senior career*
Years	Team	Apps	(Gls)
2006–2007	→ KV Mechelen (loan)	25	(4)
2008–2015	KV Mechelen	112	(8)
2014–2015	→ OH Leuven (loan)	0	(0)
2016–	Malderen	0	(0)
- * Club domestic league appearances and goals as of 30 November 2013

Abdul-Yakuni Iddi (born 25 June 1986, in Salaga) is a Ghanaian footballer. He currently plays as an offensive midfielder for Malderen in the Belgian provincial leagues.

== Career ==
Iddi began his career by Feyenoord Ghana and joined Feyenoord Rotterdam. He played in the youth from Feyenoord, then he was loan to K.V. Mechelen, shoots four goal in 25 games and after the season was sold from KV Mechelen.

== Statistics ==
season	club	country	league	games	goals
2005-06	Feyenoord Academy	Ghana		?	?
2005-06	Feyenoord	Netherlands	Eredivisie	0	0
2006/07	K.V. Mechelen	Belgium	Second Division	25	4
2007/08	K.V. Mechelen	Belgium	Jupiler League	16	0
2008/09	K.V. Mechelen	Belgium	Jupiler League	13	0
2009-10	K.V. Mechelen	Belgium	Jupiler League	16	1
2010-11	K.V. Mechelen	Belgium	Jupiler League	1	0
