= Jan Mertens (footballer) =

Belgian footballer

Personal information
- Date of birth: 12 January 1995 (age 31)
- Place of birth: Belgium
- Height: 1.82 m (6 ft 0 in)
- Position: Midfielder

Team information
- Current team: Lommel United

Senior career*
Years	Team	Apps	(Gls)
2014–2015	KV Mechelen	1	(0)
2015–	Lommel United		
- * Club domestic league appearances and goals as of 10 August 2014

Jan Mertens (born 25 February 1995) is a Belgian footballer who currently plays for Lommel United as a midfielder in the Belgian Second Division.

== Club career ==
Mertens made his Belgian Pro League debut at 18 October 2014 against R.S.C. Anderlecht. He replaced Ivan Obradović as an 88th-minute substitute in a 1–1 draw at Achter de Kazerne.
