= Clément Petit (footballer) =

Belgian footballer

Personal information
- Date of birth: 11 January 1998 (age 28)
- Place of birth: Tournai, Belgium
- Height: 1.88 m (6 ft 2 in)
- Position: Forward

Team information
- Current team: RFC Molenbaix

Youth career
- Blandain
- –2015: Mouscron
- 2015–2018: Anderlecht

Senior career*
Years	Team	Apps	(Gls)
2018–2019	Mouscron	9	(0)
2018–2019	→ Francs Borains (loan)		
2019–2021	RFC Tournai		
2021–	RFC Molenbaix		

International career
2015	Belgium U17	1	(0)
- * Club domestic league appearances and goals as of 18 May 2018

Clément Petit (born 11 January 1998) is a Belgian football player. He plays for RFC Molenbaix.

== Club career ==
He made his Belgian First Division A debut for Mouscron on 3 March 2018 in a game against Lokeren.

Ahead of the 2019–20 season, Petit joined R.F.C. Tournai.
