= Mamoutou N'Diaye =

Malian footballer

Personal information
- Date of birth: 15 March 1990 (age 36)
- Place of birth: Bamako, Mali
- Height: 1.85 m (6 ft 1 in)
- Position: Defensive midfielder

Youth career
- 2000–2008: Jeanne d'Arc

Senior career*
Years	Team	Apps	(Gls)
2008	Jeanne d'Arc		
2008–2013	Gent	33	(3)
2010–2011	→ Mons (loan)	31	(1)
2013–2015	Zulte Waregem	37	(2)
2015–2018	Royal Antwerp	43	(1)
2018	Ohod	9	(1)
2019–2020	Dinamo București	18	(1)
2021	Marino	13	(0)
2021–2023	Westerlo	2	(0)

International career^{‡}
2014–2017	Mali	16	(0)
- * Club domestic league appearances and goals as of 1 July 2023 ‡ National team caps and goals as of 09:13, 17 June 2019 (UTC)

Mamoutou N'Diaye (born 15 March 1990) is a Malian professional footballer who plays as a defensive midfielder.

== Career ==
N'Diaye is a central midfielder, who also plays as central defender. He persuaded Gent in the testing period he passed in Ghent in the winter break of the 2008–09 season. He played his first minutes in the Belgian 1st Division on April 18, 2010, against Zulte-Waregem. He was the substitute of Christophe Lepoint. RSC Anderlecht was also interested in N'Diaye. However, he chose KAA Gent because he would have too many competitors in Anderlecht, and also because his agent is a good friend of the manager of KAA Gent, Michel Louwagie. In the 2010–2011 season, Mamoutou has been lent for one year to RAEC Mons.

In January 2019, N'Diaye joined Romanian club Dinamo București. He scored his first goal for Dinamo on 22 April 2019, in a game against FC Botoșani. He was released by Dinamo in August 2020.

On 2 August 2021, N'Diaye returned to Belgium and signed a two-year contract with Westerlo.

== Honours ==
Westerlo

- Belgian First Division B: 2021–22
