= Merveille Goblet =

Belgian footballer

Personal information
- Date of birth: 20 November 1994 (age 31)
- Place of birth: Jette, Belgium
- Height: 1.80 m (5 ft 11 in)
- Position: Goalkeeper

Team information
- Current team: KSC Blankenberge
- Number: 1

Youth career
- 2012–2013: Standard Liège

Senior career*
| Years | Team | Apps | (Gls) |
| 2013–2015 | Standard Liège | 0 | (0) |
| 2013–2015 | → Tubize (loan) | 50 | (0) |
| 2015–2018 | Waasland-Beveren | 41 | (0) |
| 2019–2021 | Cercle Brugge | 0 | (0) |
| 2021–2023 | Mandel United | 48 | (0) |
| 2023–2025 | Knokke | 62 | (0) |
| 2025– | KSC Blankenberge | 0 | (0) |

International career
| 2010 | Belgium U16 | 2 | (0) |
| 2011 | Belgium U17 | 2 | (0) |
| 2011–2012 | Belgium U18 | 3 | (0) |
| 2012 | Belgium U19 | 6 | (0) |
- * Club domestic league appearances and goals as of 15 January 2026

Merveille Goblet (born 20 November 1994) is a Belgian professional footballer who plays as a goalkeeper for KSC Blankenberge.

== Club career ==
Goblet is a youth exponent from Standard Liège. He played on loan for AFC Tubize during the season 2013/14 and 2014/15. In 2015, he joined Waasland-Beveren. On 3 October 2015, he made his Belgian Pro League debut with Waasland-Beveren against Sint-Truiden.

On 8 May 2023, Royal Knokke announced the signing of Goblet, from the upcoming season, on a two-year contract with an option to extend it.

== International career ==
Goblet is Belgian-born of Congolese descent, and is a youth international for Belgium.
