= 2015–16 Oud-Heverlee Leuven season =

Oud-Heverlee Leuven
2015–16 season
- Chairman: (Belgium) Jimmy Houtput
- Manager: (Belgium) Jacky Mathijssen (until 24 November) (Belgium) Emilio Ferrera (from 26 November)
- Stadium: Den Dreef
- Belgian Pro League: 16th (relegated)
- Belgian Cup: Round 7
- Top goalscorer: League: Croizet, 9 goals All: Croizet & Trossard, 9 goals each
- Highest home attendance: 8,364 vs. Anderlecht
- Lowest home attendance: 6,100 vs. Oostende
Home colours	Away colours	Third colours

The 2015–16 season was Oud-Heverlee Leuven's 14th competitive season in professional football and the team's fourth season in the Belgian Pro League. Following a loss on the final day of the regular season at home against Club Brugge, OH Leuven dropped into 16th place and was relegated as Westerlo beat Waasland-Beveren. OH Leuven also had a mediocre cup run, struggling past Belgian Second Division team Lommel United before falling 1-0 to Mouscron-Péruwelz.

== 2015–16 squad ==
- This section lists players who were in Oud-Heveree Leuven's first team squad at any point during the 2015–16 season
- The symbol § indicates player left mid-season
- The symbol # indicates player joined mid-season
- Italics indicate loan player

No.	Nationality	Name	Position	Joined	Signed From
Goalkeepers
1	(Belgium)	Yves Lenaerts	GK	2010	(Belgium) Club Brugge
21	(Belgium)	Nick Gillekens	GK	2015	Youth
26	(France)	Rudy Riou	GK	2015	(France) Lens
Defenders
2	(Belgium)	Kenny Van Hoevelen	CB	2014	(Belgium) Mechelen
3	(Belgium)	David Vandenbroeck^{§}	CB	2014	(Belgium) Tubize
4	(France)	Romain Reynaud	CB	2014	(Belgium) Kortrijk
5	(Belgium)	Pierre-Yves Ngawa	RB	2015	(Belgium) Lierse
6	(France)	Jean Calvé^{#}	RB	2015	(France) Caen
16	(Greece)	Konstantinos Rougalas	CB	2015	(Greece) Iraklis
17	(Serbia)	Slobodan Urošević	LB	Loan	(Serbia) Napredak Kruševac
24	(Belgium)	Nicolas Delporte	LB	2014	(Belgium) Gent
25	(Brazil)	Kanu^{#}	CB	2016	(Portugal) Vitória Guimarães
28	(Ukraine)	Oleksandr Volovyk	CB / LB	Loan	(Ukraine) Shakhtar Donetsk
29	(Belgium)	Pieter-Jan Monteyne	LB	2015	(Belgium) Mouscron-Péruwelz
Midfielders
8	(Ivory Coast) / (France)	Flavien Le Postollec	CM	2014	(Belgium) Mons
10	(France)	Yohan Croizet	AM	2014	(Belgium) Virton
12	(Belgium)	Kenneth Houdret	CM	Loan	(Belgium) Charleroi
15	(Trinidad and Tobago) / (England)	John Bostock	CM	2014	(Belgium) Antwerp
22	(Ghana)	Samuel Asamoah	CM	Loan	(Belgium) Eupen
24	(France)	Kevin Tapoko^{§}	CM	2015	(Belgium) Dessel Sport
30	(Belgium)	Jordy Lokando	CM	2015	Youth
31	(Belgium)	Charni Ekangamene^{#}	CM	Loan	(Belgium) Zulte Waregem
Forwards
7	(Belgium)	Jordan Remacle	RW / CF	2015	(Belgium) Lokeren
9	(Curaçao)	Romero Regales	CF	2015	(Belgium) Lommel United
11	(Belgium)	Alessandro Cerigioni	CF	2013	(Belgium) Lommel United
14	(Belgium)	Thomas Azevedo	LW / RW	2011	(Belgium) Lommel United
19	(Belgium)	Leandro Trossard	AM / LW / RW	Loan	(Belgium) Genk
20	(Belgium)	Din Sula	CF	2015	Youth
23	(North Macedonia)	Jovan Kostovski	CF	2013	(North Macedonia) Vardar
27	(Nigeria)	Kim Ojo	CF	2015	(Belgium) Genk

== Transfers ==
Following the promotion from the Belgian Second Division on 26 May 2015 by virtue of winning the play-offs, only few players were deemed capable of competing at the highest level. The squad consisted of many decent players, but at least ten new players would need to be signed and only former Belgian international goalkeeper Logan Bailly and young wingback Dion Cools were often named as having sufficient skills. Both players would leave OH Leuven throughout the summer however, as Bailly was signed as a back-up for Craig Gordon by Scottish giants Celtic, while 19-year-old Cools was signed by Club Brugge because of his great potential. Other departures included fan favorite Kenny Thompson and striker on loan Giuseppe Rossini who had both announced their departure before the promotion was achieved while secondary striker Ibrahim Somé and young goalkeeper Senne Vits also left the team soon after the promotion as they were signed by WS Brussels and Standard Liège respectively. The contracts of Abdul-Yakuni Iddi, David Wijns and Ben Yagan were not renewed and the players released, while youngster Simon Bracke was loaned to Second Division team ASV Geel and defender Matthias Trenson was given a free transfer to Belgian Third Division team Hasselt.

Following all these departures, OH Leuven was forced to sign several new players to strengthen the squad. Mid-June three signings were announced, including return of popular winger and former OH Leuven player Jordan Remacle who was part of the 2010–11 Belgian Second Division title winning team, scoring 15 league goals that season, the signing of 23-year old defender Pierre-Yves Ngawa from relegated side Lierse and the 2014–15 Belgian Second Division top scorer Romero Regales. In July, manager Jacky Mathijssen brought in 21-year old Greek defender Konstantinos Rougalas, who he had worked with two years earlier when they were together at Fostiras and announced the loan deals of no less than four midfielders: Samuel Asamoah, Kenneth Houdret, Leandro Trossard and Slobodan Urošević. With the departure of first goalkeeper Logan Bailly and reserve keeper Senne Vits, the team was down to two goalkeepers, Yves Lenaerts and Nick Gillekens, leading to the signing of French experienced 35-year old goalkeeper Rudy Riou, who would turn out to become the first goalkeeper, with Lenaerts his backup.

Towards the end of the summer 2015 transfer window, OH Leuven loaned Ukrainian defender Oleksandr Volovyk from Shakhtar Donetsk and signed wingback Pieterjan Monteyne and striker Kim Ojo. This in turn led to the departure of Olivier Lusamba who was given a free transfer, while both Yohan Brouckaert and Kenneth Van Goethem were loaned out to Belgian Second Division teams as they were unlikely to be getting much time on the field. Defender Kenny Van Hoevelen was also deemed surplus, but remained in the squad and would not play a single minute throughout the season, except for matches with the reserves.

In the weeks prior to the winter 2015–16 transfer window, OHL signed free agent player Jean Calvé as a backup for Pierre-Yves Ngawa while releasing midfielder Kevin Tapoko after his contract was terminated by mutual consent, while during the transfer window itself defender David Vandenbroeck opted to leave the team as he did not receive much playing time. He was replaced by experienced Brazilian defender Kanu who already knew the Belgian competition after playing three seasons with Standard Liège earlier in his career. OH Leuven had also announced the arrival of Serbian midfielder Marko Poletanović on loan from Gent, however the deal did not materialize as the player did not agree to the transfer. Towards the end of the transfer window, youngster Charni Ekangamene was loaned from Zulte Waregem instead.

=== Transfers In ===
Date from	Position	Nationality	Name	From	Fee	Ref.
16 June 2015	MF	(Belgium)	Jordan Remacle	(Belgium) Lokeren	Undisclosed	
17 June 2015	DF	(Belgium)	Pierre-Yves Ngawa	(Belgium) Lierse	Undisclosed	
17 June 2015	FW	(Curaçao)	Romero Regales	(Belgium) Lommel United	Undisclosed	
2 July 2015	DF	(Greece)	Konstantinos Rougalas	(Greece) Iraklis	Undisclosed	
2 July 2015	MF	(Serbia)	Slobodan Urošević	(Serbia) Napredak Kruševac	Loan	
7 July 2015	MF	(Belgium)	Leandro Trossard	(Belgium) Genk	Loan	
8 July 2015	MF	(Belgium)	Kenneth Houdret	(Belgium) Charleroi	Loan	
16 July 2015	MF	(Ghana)	Samuel Asamoah	(Belgium) Eupen	Loan	
22 July 2015	GK	(France)	Rudy Riou	(France) Lens	Undisclosed	
20 August 2015	DF	(Ukraine)	Oleksandr Volovyk	(Ukraine) Shakhtar Donetsk	Loan	
21 August 2015	DF	(Belgium)	Pieterjan Monteyne	(Belgium) Mouscron-Péruwelz	Undisclosed	
31 August 2015	FW	(Nigeria)	Kim Ojo	(Belgium) Genk	Undisclosed	
17 December 2015	DF	(France)	Jean Calvé	Free Agent	NA	
29 December 2015	DF	(Brazil)	Kanu	(Portugal) Vitória Guimarães	Undisclosed	
1 February 2016	MF	(Belgium)	Charni Ekangamene	(Belgium) Zulte Waregem	Loan	

=== Transfers Out ===
Date to	Position	Nationality	Name	To	Fee	Ref.
23 April 2015	DF	(Belgium)	Kenny Thompson	(Belgium) Beerschot Wilrijk	Free transfer	
4 May 2015	FW	(Belgium)	Giuseppe Rossini	(Belgium) Charleroi	Loan Return	
26 May 2015	GK	(Belgium)	Senne Vits	(Belgium) Standard Liège	Undisclosed	
28 May 2015	FW	(Democratic Republic of the Congo)	Ibrahim Somé	(Belgium) WS Brussels	Undisclosed	
End of 2014–15 season	MF	(Ghana)	Abdul-Yakuni Iddi	(Belgium) Mechelen	Loan Return	
End of 2014–15 season	DF	(Belgium)	David Wijns	(Belgium) Heist	Free	
End of 2014–15 season	FW	(Belgium)	Ben Yagan	Free Agent	End of contract	
19 June 2015	DF	(Belgium)	Dion Cools	(Belgium) Club Brugge	Undisclosed	
8 July 2015	MF	(Belgium)	Simon Bracke	(Belgium) ASV Geel	Loan	
8 July 2015	GK	(Belgium)	Logan Bailly	(Scotland) Celtic	Undisclosed	
8 July 2015	DF	(Belgium)	Matthias Trenson	(Belgium) Hasselt	Free	
20 August 2015	FW	(Democratic Republic of the Congo)	Olivier Lusamba	(Belgium) Aalst	Free	
29 August 2015	MF	(Belgium)	Yohan Brouckaert	(Belgium) Roeselare	Loan	
31 August 2015	MF	(Belgium)	Kenneth Van Goethem	(Belgium) Heist	Loan	
23 December 2015	MF	(France)	Kevin Tapoko	Free Agent	Contract terminated by mutual consent	
11 January 2016	DF	(Belgium)	David Vandenbroeck	(Luxembourg) Differdange	Free	

== Pre-season ==
In the month following the promotion to the Belgian Pro League, OH Leuven renewed partnerships with several of its sponsors. They first confirmed extended partnerships with Rayden Transport, Tegelconcept, GMS-Group and Dataflow before announcing Just Eat as the new lead shirt sponsor replacing Option, the company led by former OHL chairman Jan Callewaert. A few weeks later, Federale Verzekering also prolongs its sponsorship agreement, followed by Eneco, coming in as a new sponsor at the start of season. Meanwhile, Patrick De Wilde was brought into the staff as technical coordinator and the players are required to return to training on 22 June 2015.

On 8 June 2015, the Belgian Pro League fixtures for the 2015–16 season are announced. Oud-Heverlee Leuven opens the season with an away match to Genk on 25 July 2015, while Anderlecht will be the first opponent to come and play at Den Dreef on matchday 2. One week later, the appointed commission of the Royal Belgian Football Association approves the planned reform of the Belgian football league system which will mean that in contrast to the previous seasons only the team finishing in last position will relegate from the Belgian Pro League, while the team in 15th place will be safe.

OHL kicks of the series of friendlies with three matches against local teams from lower divisions. The first game results in a 0-12 victory away to sixth division team Linden, a match in which no less than 21 players were used. Five players did not play due to minor injuries, including Logan Bailly, Yohan Brouckaert and newcomers Romero Regales and Jordan Remacle. Four days later against a very defensive Kortenberg, also playing in the sixth division, the match went much more difficult, with OHL only managing to score two goals prompting coach Jacky Mathijssen to state that "it was a bit dull" and that "he expected more of his players". Three days later, at temperatures close to 30 degrees Celsius, the team beat Bierbeek from the fifth division by four goals to one. Following a week of training, OHL lost its first match of the season away to Belgian Second Division team Heist, with John Bostock scoring the consolation goal from a penalty kick, which was followed by a 0-3 win against Cercle Brugge three days later, with Jovan Kostovski working hard and scoring twice. On 15 July 2015, a 1-1 draw was obtained against Belgian Fourth Division team Tessenderlo in a match which featured mostly the players that had not received much playing time thus far, including a first starting lineup position for new striker Romero Regales. Following the match, assistant coach Hans Vander Elst states that "except for Yohan Brouckaert, everyone will be fit for the start of the season". Named as the dress rehearsal match, the friendly against Differdange from Luxembourg was seen as the final test to prepare for the start of the competition. Jordan Remacle scored twice before halftime, while Croizet, Houdret, Regales and Sula each added one more goal in a convincing 1-6 away win.

Match	Date	Opponent	Venue	Result	Scorers	Report
1	24 June 2015	(Belgium) Linden	A	12–0	Nelissen 17', Croizet (2) 21', 43', Soladio (2) 23', 44', Cerigioni 25', Kostovski (2) 50', 85', Houben 58', Tapoko 66', Sula 69', Bracke 71' pen.	Report
2	28 June 2015	(Belgium) Kortenberg	A	2–0	Kostovski 28', Reynaud 83' pen.	Report
3	1 July 2015	(Belgium) Bierbeek	A	4–1	Van Hoevelen 17', Ngawa 29', Delporte 75', Azevedo 81' pen.	Report
4	8 July 2015	(Belgium) Heist	A	1–3	Bostock 19' pen.	Report
5	11 July 2015	(Belgium) Cercle Brugge	A	3–0	Kostovski (2) 46', 56', Verkindere 62' o.g.	Report
6	15 July 2015	(Belgium) Tessenderlo	A	1–1	Lokando 44'	Report
7	19 July 2015	(Luxembourg) Differdange	A	6–1	Remacle (2) 10' pen., 44', Croizet 46', Regales 61', Houdret 63', Sula 89'	Report

== Belgian Pro League ==
OHL's fourth season in the Belgian Pro League began on 25 July 2015.

=== Results ===
Match	Date	Opponent	Venue	Result	Attendance	Scorers	Report	League Position
1	25 July 2015	Genk	A	1–3	16,120	Kostovski 63'	Report	14th
2	2 August 2015	Anderlecht	H	0–2	8,364		Report	15th
3	8 August 2015	Westerlo	A	2–3	6,500	Kostovski (2) 21', 78'	Report	15th
4	16 August 2015	Charleroi	H	2–0	7,108	Bostock 49' pen., Trossard 85'	Report	14th
5	22 August 2015	Mechelen	A	1–2	9,782	Houdret 87'	Report	15th
6	29 August 2015	Sint-Truiden	H	1–0	7,788	Trossard 51'	Report	12th
7	12 September 2015	Kortrijk	A	0–0	7,110		Report	12th
8	19 September 2015	Zulte Waregem	H	2–3	7,500	Cerigioni 29', Trossard 82'	Report	14th
9	26 September 2015	Standard Liège	A	2–2	23,919	Croizet 1', Remacle 43'	Report	13th
10	3 October 2015	Mouscron-Péruwelz	H	1–1	7,125	Bostock 83' pen.	Report	12th
11	17 October 2015	Lokeren	A	2–1	7,229	Croizet (2) 3', 73'	Report	11th
12	24 October 2015	Waasland-Beveren	H	0–2	7,100		Report	13th
13	28 October 2015	Club Brugge	A	0–2	25,000		Report	14th
14	31 October 2015	Gent	H	0–2	8,150		Report	15th
15	7 November 2015	Oostende	A	0–3	6,655		Report	15th
16	21 November 2015	Genk	H	1–3	7,620	Cerigioni 63'	Report	15th
17	29 November 2015	Anderlecht	A	2–3	16,500	Croizet 2', Trossard 49'	Report	15th
18	5 December 2015	Westerlo	H	5–1	7,359	Kostovski (2) 9', 24', Bostock 39', Remacle 50', Trossard 81'	Report	15th
19	12 December 2015	Charleroi	A	1–2	8,846	Remacle 69'	Report	15th
20	19 December 2015	Mechelen	H	3–1	8,068	Croizet 52', Cerigioni 56', Bostock 76' pen.	Report	15th
21	26 December 2015	Sint-Truiden	A	2–2	10,936	Asamoah 29', Ngawa 85'	Report	15th
22	16 January 2016	Kortrijk	H	1–0	6,300	Kostovski 75'	Report	14th
23	23 January 2016	Zulte Waregem	A	2–2	8,078	Croizet 45', Azevedo 74'	Report	14th
24	30 January 2016	Standard Liège	H	0–2	6,404		Report	14th
25	6 February 2016	Waasland-Beveren	A	2–2	5,553	Croizet 6', Trossard 57'	Report	14th
26	13 February 2016	Lokeren	H	3–3	6,200	Kanu 54', Ojo 69', Bostock 81' pen.	Report	15th
27	20 February 2016	Mouscron-Péruwelz	A	1–3	4,000	Trossard 13'	Report	16th
28	27 February 2016	Oostende	H	4–1	6,153	Bostock (2) 27' pen., 56' Croizet (2) 29', 59'	Report	14th
29	4 March 2016	Gent	A	1–1	19,999	Trossard 52'	Report	15th
30	13 March 2016	Club Brugge	H	0–1	6,400		Report	16th

=== League table ===
Pos	Team	Pld	W	D	L	GF	GA	GD	Pts	Qualification or relegation
12	Waasland-Beveren	30	9	6	15	40	57	−17	33	Qualification for the Europa League play-offs
13	Sint-Truiden	30	8	6	16	28	47	−19	30	Qualification for the Europa League play-offs
14	Mouscron-Péruwelz	30	7	9	14	39	51	−12	30	Qualification for the Europa League play-offs
15	Westerlo	30	7	9	14	35	59	−24	30	
16	OH Leuven (R)	30	7	8	15	42	53	−11	29	Relegation to First Division B

Source: Belgian Pro League, Soccerway
Rules for classification: 1) Points; 2) Matches won; 3) Goal difference; 4) Goals scored; 5) Away goals scored; 6) Away matches won; 7) Play-off.
(R) Relegated

== Belgian Cup ==
OH Leuven were drawn at home to Belgian Second Division side Lommel United in the sixth round of the 2015–16 Belgian Cup. The game saw four players score against their former team, as Cerigioni, Trossard and Regales each scored in the first half for OH Leuven while on the other side former OHL player Wouter Scheelen scored through a stunning long range shot. Christophe Bertjens scored the second goal for Lommel United in the second half and after OHL failed to score following several opportunities, Brandon Deville nearly equalized in the last minute but his shot went high over the target which allowed OHL to progress. The seventh round saw OH Leuven play away at Mouscron-Péruwelz, in a game which took place just three days before the important relegation clash against Westerlo, causing Emilio Ferrera to leave regulars John Bostock, Yohan Croizet, Flavien Le Postollec, Jordan Remacle and Leandro Trossard out of the starting lineup. Mouscron-Péruwelz started strongly, creating several chances with both Tristan Dingomé and Filip Marković coming close to the opening goal in the first few minutes. The goal eventually came after 16 minutes when a free kick by François Marquet, carried by the wind, floated over all players and Rudy Riou straight into the goal. Kenneth Houdret and Pierre-Yves Ngawa came closest in the first half to equalize for OH Leuven but did not succeed. In a dull second half, the OH Leuven players seemed to be thinking more of the upcoming clash with Westerlo not creating chances, while Mouscron-Péruwelz was happy to defend their one-goal lead instead of pushing for more.

=== Results ===
Match	Date	Opponent	Venue	Result	Scorers	Report
R6	23 September 2015	Lommel United	H	3–2	Trossard 6', Cerigioni 35', Regales 40'	Report
R7	2 December 2015	Mouscron-Péruwelz	A	0–1		Report

== Season Friendlies ==
During the season, OH Leuven played several friendlies. The traditional friendlies occurred early September (against Genk) to bridge the gap caused by the international matches and in the beginning of January following the short winter break. The other friendlies were the result of the 2016 reform of the Belgian football league system, which meant that following the 2015–16 Belgian Pro League regular season, the team had no more official matches from mid March until the beginning of the next season, effectively a four-month break. To bridge the gap, the team organised a series of friendlies in March, April and May which supporters could attend for free. On 20 April OHL invited several players on trial to participate in the match against Belgian Fourth Division team Francs Borains.

Match	Date	Opponent	Venue	Result	Scorers	Report
1	4 September 2015	(Belgium) Genk	A	0–1		Report
2	8 January 2016	(Netherlands) Jong PSV	H	0–0		Report
3	24 March 2016	(Belgium) Charleroi	H	0–1		Report
4	1 April 2016	(Belgium) Roeselare	H	0–2		Report
5	7 April 2016	(Belgium) WS Brussels	H	2–1	Kostovski, Sula	Report
6	15 April 2016	(Belgium) Westerlo	A	1–2	Kostovski	Report
7	20 April 2016	(Belgium) Francs Borains	H	1–2	Guidiala	Report
8	29 April 2016	(Belgium) Standard Liège	H	1–2	Croizet	Report
9	6 May 2016	(Belgium) Eupen	H	0–2		Report

== Matchday squads ==
The following lineups were used by Oud-Heverlee Leuven during the season.

Date	Type	Opposition	V	Score	Result	Starting 11	12	13	14	15	16	17	18	19	20
27/07/15	League	Genk	A	1–3	L	Lenaerts, Rougalas, Vandenbroeck (yellow card) , Reynaud (yellow card) , Delporte, Le Postollec, Croizet (substituted off) 61', Bostock, Tapoko (substituted off) 45', Remacle (substituted off) 78', Cerigioni	Kostovski (substituted on) 45'	Trossard (substituted on) 61'	Azevedo (substituted on) 78'	Houdret	Urošević	Gillekens	Lokando		
02/08/15	League	Anderlecht	H	0–2	L	Riou, Remacle, Vandenbroeck, Reynaud, Rougalas (yellow card) , Asamoah, Le Postollec, Cerigioni (substituted off) 76', Bostock (substituted off) 76', Croizet, Kostovski	Trossard (substituted on) 46'	Delporte (substituted on) 76'	Lenaerts	Regales	Houdret	Azevedo	Urošević		
08/08/15	League	Westerlo	A	2–3	L	Riou, Ngawa, Rougalas, Reynaud, Delporte (substituted off) 80', Le Postollec (yellow card) , Trossard (substituted off) 60', Bostock (substituted off) 60', Remacle, Kostovski (yellow card), Croizet (yellow card)	Asamoah (substituted on) 60' (red card)	Cerigioni (substituted on) 60'	Regales (substituted on) 80'	Lenaerts	Vandenbroeck	Houdret	Azevedo		
16/08/15	League	Charleroi	H	2–0	W	Riou, Ngawa, Reynaud, Rougalas, Delporte (substituted off) 80', Le Postollec, Cerigioni, Bostock (substituted off) 72', Croizet (substituted off) 82', Kostovski (yellow card) , Remacle	Houdret (substituted on) 72'	Vandenbroeck (substituted on) 80'	Trossard (substituted on) 82'	Lenaerts	Regales	Azevedo	Tapoko		
22/08/15	League	Mechelen	A	1–2	L	Riou, Ngawa, Rougalas (substituted off) 76' (yellow card) , Reynaud, Vandenbroeck (substituted off) 61' (yellow card) , Le Postollec, Asamoah, Houdret, Croizet, Kostovski (substituted off) 36', Remacle (yellow card)	Regales (substituted on) 36'	Trossard (substituted on) 61'	Cerigioni (substituted on) 76' (yellow card)	Lenaerts	Bostock	Tapoko	Delporte		
29/08/15	League	Sint-Truiden	H	1–0	W	Riou, Ngawa, Reynaud, Rougalas (yellow card) , Monteyne, Croizet (substituted off) 83', Le Postollec (yellow card) , Trossard, Bostock (substituted off) 74' (yellow card) , Remacle (substituted off) 71', Regales	Azevedo (substituted on) 71'	Houdret (substituted on) 74'	Asamoah (substituted on) 83'	Lenaerts	Vandenbroeck	Sula	Delporte		
12/09/15	League	Kortrijk	A	0–0	D	Riou, Rougalas, Reynaud, Volovyk, Monteyne, Remacle (yellow card) , Le Postollec, Cerigioni (substituted off) 56', Bostock (yellow card) , Trossard (substituted off) 88' (yellow card) , Regales (substituted off) 63'	Croizet (substituted on) 56'	Ojo (substituted on) 63'	Azevedo (substituted on) 88'	Lenaerts	Ngawa	Houdret	Asamoah	Delporte	
19/09/15	League	Zulte Waregem	H	2–3	L	Riou, Rougalas, Reynaud, Volovyk (substituted off) 78', Monteyne, Croizet, Le Postollec (yellow card) , Cerigioni (substituted off) 67', Bostock, Azevedo (substituted off) 75', Ojo (yellow card)	Regales (substituted on) 67'	Trossard (substituted on) 75'	Asamoah (substituted on) 78'	Lenaerts	Ngawa	Houdret	Delporte		
23/09/15	Cup	Lommel United	H	3–2	W	Riou, Ngawa, Rougalas, Reynaud, Delporte, Le Postollec, Bostock, Remacle (substituted off) 75', Cerigioni (substituted off) 80', Trossard (yellow card), Regales	Croizet (substituted on) 75'	Azevedo (substituted on) 80'	Lenaerts	Vandenbroeck	Urošević	Gillekens	Asamoah	Tapoko	Ojo
26/09/15	League	Standard Liège	A	2–2	D	Riou, Ngawa (yellow card) , Rougalas, Reynaud, Volovyk (substituted off) 49', Monteyne, Croizet (substituted off) 73', Le Postollec, Houdret, Remacle (substituted off) 78', Ojo	Vandenbroeck (substituted on) 49'	Cerigioni (substituted on) 73'	Trossard (substituted on) 78'	Lenaerts	Regales	Azevedo	Bostock	Asamoah	Delporte
03/10/15	League	Mouscron-Péruwelz	H	1–1	D	Riou, Rougalas, Reynaud (yellow card) , Ngawa, Monteyne, Le Postollec, Croizet (substituted off) 61', Bostock, Remacle, Regales (substituted off) 61', Trossard (substituted off) 84'	Ojo (substituted on) 61'	Cerigioni (substituted on) 61'	Azevedo (substituted on) 84'	Lenaerts	Vandenbroeck	Houdret	Asamoah		
17/10/15	League	Lokeren	A	2–1	W	Riou, Ngawa, Reynaud, Rougalas, Monteyne, Bostock (substituted off) 60', Asamoah, Le Postollec, Remacle, Ojo (substituted off) 60', Croizet (substituted off) 77'	Regales (substituted on) 60'	Houdret (substituted on) 65' (yellow card)	Trossard (substituted on) 77'	Lenaerts	Vandenbroeck	Cerigioni	Azevedo	Delporte	
24/10/15	League	Waasland-Beveren	H	0–2	L	Riou, Ngawa (yellow card) , Reynaud (yellow card) , Rougalas, Monteyne (substituted off) 60', Le Postollec, Asamoah, Bostock, Remacle, Ojo (substituted off) 37', Croizet (substituted off) 60'	Regales (substituted on) 37'	Trossard (substituted on) 62'	Cerigioni (substituted on) 62'	Lenaerts	Vandenbroeck	Houdret	Azevedo		
28/10/15	League	Club Brugge	A	0–2	L	Riou, Ngawa (yellow card) , Reynaud, Rougalas, Monteyne, Asamoah (substituted off) 59', Le Postollec, Cerigioni, Houdret (substituted off) 76', Trossard, Croizet (substituted off) 59'	Regales (substituted on) 59'	Remacle (substituted on) 59'	Azevedo (substituted on) 76'	Lenaerts	Vandenbroeck	Sula	Delporte		
31/10/15	League	Gent	H	0–2	L	Riou, Ngawa, Reynaud (substituted off) 39', Rougalas (yellow card) , Monteyne (yellow card) , Remacle, Le Postollec, Trossard, Houdret (substituted off) 75', Tapoko, Regales	Croizet (substituted on) 39'	Azevedo (substituted on) 75'	Lenaerts	Vandenbroeck	Cerigioni	Urošević	Gillekens	Asamoah	Delporte
07/11/15	League	Oostende	A	0–3	L	Riou, Ngawa, Reynaud (yellow card) , Rougalas, Monteyne (yellow card) , Le Postollec, Trossard, Bostock (substituted off) 45', Remacle, Cerigioni (substituted off) 73', Tapoko (yellow card)	Regales (substituted on) 45'	Asamoah (substituted on) 73'	Croizet	Houdret	Azevedo	Urošević	Sula	Gillekens	
21/11/15	League	Genk	H	1–3	L	Riou, Ngawa, Rougalas, Volovyk, Monteyne, Le Postollec, Asamoah (substituted off) 35', Houdret (substituted off) 59', Remacle (yellow card) , Sula (substituted off) 59', Trossard	Cerigioni (substituted on) 35' (yellow card)	Bostock (substituted on) 59'	Kostovski (substituted on) 59'	Lenaerts	Vandenbroeck	Azevedo	Tapoko		
29/11/15	League	Anderlecht	A	2–3	L	Riou, Ngawa (yellow card) , Reynaud (yellow card) , Volovyk (yellow card) , Monteyne, Le Postollec (yellow card) , Croizet, Bostock (substituted off) 81', Remacle, Kostovski (substituted off) 81' (yellow card) , Trossard	Tapoko (substituted on) 81'	Cerigioni (substituted on) 81'	Lenaerts	Vandenbroeck	Houdret	Rougalas	Asamoah		
02/12/15	Cup	Mouscron-Péruwelz	A	0–1	L	Riou, Vandenbroeck (yellow card) , Reynaud, Ngawa, Cerigioni, Houdret (substituted off) 79', Azevedo, Rougalas (substituted off) 71', Asamoah, Tapoko (substituted off) 71', Monteyne	Remacle (substituted on) 71' (yellow card)	Croizet (substituted on) 71'	Bostock (substituted on) 79'	Lenaerts	Le Postollec	Urošević	Trossard		
05/12/15	League	Westerlo	H	5–1	W	Riou, Ngawa, Rougalas, Volovyk (yellow card) , Monteyne, Remacle, Bostock (substituted off) 84', Croizet (substituted off) 68', Le Postollec, Trossard, Kostovski (substituted off) 63'	Cerigioni (substituted on) 63'	Asamoah (substituted on) 68'	Houdret (substituted on) 84'	Lenaerts	Vandenbroeck	Azevedo	Tapoko		
12/12/15	League	Charleroi	A	1–2	L	Riou, Ngawa, Reynaud, Volovyk, Monteyne, Remacle (substituted off) 68', Bostock, Croizet, Le Postollec (yellow card) , Trossard, Cerigioni (substituted off) 74'	Azevedo (substituted on) 74'	Tapoko (substituted on) 86'	Lenaerts	Vandenbroeck	Houdret	Rougalas	Asamoah	Delporte	
19/12/15	League	Mechelen	H	3–1	W	Riou (yellow card) , Ngawa, Reynaud, Volovyk (yellow card) , Monteyne, Asamoah (substituted off) 80' (yellow card) , Houdret (yellow card) , Bostock, Trossard (substituted off) 90+2' (yellow card) , Croizet (substituted off) 74' (yellow card) , Cerigioni	Regales (substituted on) 74'	Azevedo (substituted on) 80'	Urošević (substituted on) 90+2'	Lenaerts	Vandenbroeck	Calvé	Rougalas	Delporte	
26/12/15	League	Sint-Truiden	A	2–2	D	Riou, Ngawa, Reynaud (yellow card) , Volovyk (yellow card) , Monteyne, Remacle (substituted off) 73', Le Postollec, Bostock, Asamoah (substituted off) 84', Trossard, Croizet (substituted off) 80' (yellow card)	Cerigioni (substituted on) 73'	Houdret (substituted on) 80'	Azevedo (substituted on) 84'	Lenaerts	Calvé	Rougalas	Urošević		
16/01/16	League	Kortrijk	H	1–0	W	Riou, Ngawa, Kanu (yellow card) , Volovyk (yellow card) , Monteyne, Remacle, Bostock, Croizet (substituted off) 84', Le Postollec, Trossard (substituted off) 90+4', Kostovski (substituted off) 82'	Ojo (substituted on) 82'	Houdret (substituted on) 84'	Asamoah (substituted on) 90+4'	Lenaerts	Reynaud	Calvé	Cerigioni		
23/01/16	League	Zulte Waregem	A	2–2	D	Riou, Ngawa, Kanu, Reynaud, Monteyne, Remacle, Bostock (yellow card) (yellow-red card) , Croizet (substituted off) 70', Le Postollec, Trossard (substituted off) 66', Kostovski (substituted off) 89' (yellow card)	Houdret (substituted on) 66'	Azevedo (substituted on) 70'	Cerigioni (substituted on) 89'	Lenaerts	Rougalas	Asamoah	Ojo		
30/01/16	League	Standard Liège	H	0–2	L	Riou, Ngawa, Reynaud, Volovyk (yellow card) , Monteyne, Remacle (substituted off) 85', Houdret, Croizet, Le Postollec (yellow card) , Trossard (substituted off) 64', Kostovski	Azevedo (substituted on) 64'	Asamoah (substituted on) 85'	Lenaerts	Calvé	Cerigioni	Rougalas	Urošević	Gillekens	Ojo
06/02/16	League	Waasland-Beveren	A	2–2	D	Riou, Ngawa, Kanu, Volovyk, Monteyne, Remacle (substituted off) 82', Le Postollec (yellow card) (yellow-red card) , Croizet (substituted off) 80', Bostock, Trossard, Kostovski (substituted off) 74' (yellow card)	Houdret (substituted on) 74'	Ojo (substituted on) 80'	Azevedo (substituted on) 82'	Lenaerts	Reynaud	Calvé	Asamoah		
13/02/16	League	Lokeren	H	3–3	D	Riou, Ngawa, Kanu, Volovyk (yellow card) , Monteyne, Remacle (substituted off) 77', Bostock, Croizet, Houdret (yellow card) , Trossard, Ojo	Azevedo (substituted on) 77'	Lenaerts	Reynaud	Calvé	Cerigioni	Asamoah	Lokando		
20/02/16	League	Mouscron-Péruwelz	A	1–3	L	Riou, Ngawa, Reynaud, Volovyk (yellow card) , Monteyne, Remacle, Le Postollec (substituted off) 90' (yellow card) , Croizet (substituted off) 78', Bostock, Trossard, Ojo (substituted off) 56'	Houdret (substituted on) 56' (yellow card)	Kostovski (substituted on) 78'	Azevedo (substituted on) 90'	Lenaerts	Urošević	Asamoah	Kanu		
27/02/16	League	Oostende	H	4–1	W	Riou, Ngawa, Reynaud (substituted off) 90+1', Kanu, Monteyne, Remacle, Le Postollec, Croizet (substituted off) 62', Bostock, Trossard (substituted off) 90+3', Ojo	Houdret (substituted on) 62'	Urošević (substituted on) 90+1'	Asamoah (substituted on) 90+3'	Lenaerts	Cerigioni	Azevedo	Kostovski		
04/03/16	League	Gent	A	1–1	D	Riou (red card) , Ngawa (yellow card) , Reynaud, Kanu (yellow card) , Monteyne, Remacle (substituted off) 90+2', Le Postollec, Croizet (substituted off) 90+4', Bostock, Trossard, Kostovski (substituted off) 87'	Lenaerts (substituted on) 87' (yellow card)	Azevedo (substituted on) 90+2'	Houdret (substituted on) 90+4'	Rougalas	Urošević	Asamoah	Ojo		
27/02/16	League	Club Brugge	H	0–1	L	Riou, Remacle, Kanu (red card) , Reynaud (yellow card) , Monteyne, Azevedo (substituted off) 67', Le Postollec (substituted off) 74', Croizet (substituted off) 84', Bostock, Trossard, Ojo	Asamoah (substituted on) 67'	Kostovski (substituted on) 74'	Houdret (substituted on) 84'	Lenaerts	Rougalas	Urošević	Volovyk		
