= 2014–15 Belgian Second Division =

Belgian Second Division
- Season: 2014–15
- Champions: Sint-Truiden
- Promoted: Sint-Truiden; OH Leuven
- Relegated: Racing Mechelen; Woluwe-Zaventem; Mons; Aalst
- Matches: 306
- Goals: 872 (2.85 per match)
- Top goalscorer: Romero Regales (20 goals)
- Biggest home win: Virton 9–0 Royal Mechelen (4 April 2015)
- Biggest away win: Lommel United 0–6 Royal Mechelen (22 March 2015)
- Highest scoring: Patro Eisden Maasmechelen 2–6 Seraing United (3 September 2014); Woluwe-Zaventem 4–4 Roeselare (7 December 2014)

The 2014–15 season of the Belgian Second Division (also known as Belgacom League for sponsorship reasons) began on 1 August 2014 and ended on 26 April 2015.

== Team changes ==
After promotion and relegation, only 12 teams of the previous season remained in the league, with 6 others being replaced:

=== Out ===
- Westerlo were promoted as champions of the previous season.
- Mouscron-Péruwelz were promoted after winning the promotion playoffs.
- Visé were relegated to the Third Division after finishing 18th.
- Hoogstraten were relegated to the Third Division after losing the relegation playoffs.
- RWDM Brussels folded as a team.
- Boussu Dour Borinage were in financial trouble and sold their football license to Seraing United. Boussu Dour was renamed Francs Borains and themselves bought the license of a team playing in the Belgian Fourth Division.

=== In ===
- OH Leuven were relegated from the Belgian Pro League after finishing 15th.
- Mons were relegated from the Belgian Pro League after finishing 16th.
- KRC Mechelen were promoted as champions from Third Division A.
- Woluwe-Zaventem were promoted as champions from Third Division B.
- Patro Eisden Maasmechelen were promoted after winning the third division playoffs.
- Seraing United, a club from the Belgian Provincial leagues, bought the license of Boussu Dour Borinage and thereby took over its place.

== Team information ==
Locations of the 2014–15 Belgian Second Division teams

Club	City	First season of current spell in second division	Coming from	2013–14 result	Stadium	Capacity
SC Eendracht Aalst	Aalst	2011–12	Belgian Third Division	11th (D2)	Pierre Cornelisstadion	7,500
Royal Antwerp F.C.	Antwerp	2004–05	Belgian Pro League	7th (D2)	Bosuilstadion	16,649
K.F.C. Dessel Sport	Dessel	2012–13	Belgian Third Division	15th (D2)	Lorzestraat	5,000
K.A.S. Eupen	Eupen	2011–12	Belgian Pro League	2nd (D2)	Kehrweg Stadion	8,000
AS Verbroedering Geel	Geel	2013–14	Belgian Third Division	10th (D2)	De Leunen	10,022
K.S.K. Heist	Heist-op-den-Berg	2010–11	Belgian Third Division	16th (D2)	Gemeentelijk Sportcentrum	3,000
Lommel United	Lommel	2005–06	Belgian Third Division	5th (D2)	Soevereinstadion	12,500
Oud-Heverlee Leuven	Leuven	2014–15	Belgian Pro League	15th (D1)	Den Dreef	9,493
K.R.C. Mechelen	Mechelen	2014–15	Belgian Third Division	1st (D3A)	Oscar Vankesbeeck Stadion	13,687
R.A.E.C. Mons	Mons	2014–15	Belgian Pro League	16th (D1)	Stade Charles Tondreau	13,000
K. Patro Eisden Maasmechelen	Maasmechelen	2014–15	Belgian Third Division	3rd (D3B)	Patro-stadion	5,000
K.S.V. Roeselare	Roeselare	2010–11	Belgian Pro League	14th (D2)	Schiervelde Stadion	9,075
Seraing United	Seraing	2014–15	Belgian Provincial Leagues	9th (D2) as Boussu Dour Borinage	Stade Pairay	6,744
K. Sint-Truidense V.V.	Sint-Truiden	2012–13	Belgian Pro League	3rd (D2)	Stayen	14,600
A.F.C. Tubize	Tubize	2009–10	Belgian Pro League	6th (D2)	Stade Leburton	9,000
R. White Star Bruxelles	Brussels	2011–12	Belgian Third Division	12th (D2)	Stade Fallon	2,500
R.E. Virton	Virton	2013–14	Belgian Third Division	13th (D2)	Stade Yvan Georges	4,000
K.V. Woluwe-Zaventem	Zaventem	2014–15	Belgian Third Division	1st (D3B)	Gemeentelijk Sportstadion	1,500

== Regular season ==
=== League table ===
Pos	Team	Pld	W	D	L	GF	GA	GD	Pts	Promotion or relegation
1	Sint-Truiden (C, P)	34	24	7	3	62	28	+34	79	Belgian First Division
2	Lommel	34	21	7	6	65	27	+38	70	Qualification for Promotion play-off (Note: The promotion playoff is to be played by the three period winners. As champions Sint-Truiden won the second period, their spot was taken by the first team not yet qualified, Eupen. They will be joined by the first period winners Oud-Heverlee Leuven and the third period winners Lommel United.)
3	Eupen	34	20	7	7	63	30	+33	67	Qualification for Promotion play-off
4	Seraing United	34	17	10	7	69	39	+30	61	(Note: On 8 April 2015, the Belgian FA announced officially that no less than 8 teams did not receive a football license for the 2015–16 Belgian Second Division. Besides RC Mechelen and Woluwe-Zaventem who had not applied and Mons who were now bankrupt, five more teams were denied a licence: Aalst, Antwerp, Seraing United, Tubize and WS Brussels . All five of the latter teams announced they were going to appeal to the decision, by using legal procedures to obtain a licence through the Belgian Sports Arbitrage (BAS) committee. In case the BAS does not rule they fulfill the requirements set by the Belgian FA, these five teams will be relegated to the Belgian Third Division .) (Note: The BAS ruled that WS Brussels should be given a licence on 28 April 2015 and one week later also handed Seraing and Antwerp a licence on 4 May 2015 and 5 May 2015 respectively . Aalst was denied a licence on 7 May 2015, causing them to be relegated to the Belgian Third Division. Tubize was awarded a licence on 9 May 2015)
5	OH Leuven (O, P)	34	17	10	7	66	39	+27	61	Qualification for Promotion play-off
6	Virton	34	17	8	9	66	39	+27	59	
7	Mons (R)	34	14	13	7	52	30	+22	55	(Note: Mons announced on 16 February 2015 that they had applied for bankruptcy. At that point it was unclear whether they would be able to find an investor in time to allow the club to remain in the Second Division and even whether they would be able to finish the season.. On March 31, it was announced that the club was effectively bankrupt and would be liquidated. They will finish the remaining few matches of the season but it is unsure whether the team will fold as a whole, or restart in a lower division. In any case, they will relegate from the Belgian Second Division. As a result, there are already three teams relegating to the Belgian Third Division and no relegation playoff will be played by any team from the second division this season. Normally, the 16th placed team would have taken part. .) (Note: On 18 February 2015, the Belgian FA released the names of the teams that had applied for a football license to be able to play in the 2015–16 Belgian Second Division. As both Racing Mechelen and Woluwe-Zaventem had not applied, they will relegate to the Belgian Third Division for the 2015-16 season, irrespective of their finishing position .)
8	Tubize	34	14	8	12	43	30	+13	50	
9	Aalst (R)	34	12	10	12	48	45	+3	46	
10	Antwerp	34	11	9	14	41	41	0	42	
11	Roeselare	34	10	12	12	44	45	−1	42	
12	WS Brussels	34	8	16	10	43	48	−5	40	
13	ASV Geel	34	10	9	15	42	62	−20	39	
14	Heist	34	10	6	18	41	61	−20	36	
15	Dessel	34	7	10	17	36	58	−22	31	
16	Patro Eisden Maasmechelen	34	6	8	20	38	68	−30	26	
17	Racing Mechelen (R)	34	5	4	25	23	87	−64	19	Relegation to 2015–16 Belgian Third Division
18	Woluwe-Zaventem (R)	34	3	6	25	30	81	−51	15	Relegation to 2015–16 Belgian Third Division

Source: Belgian Second Division
Rules for classification: 1) points; 2) number of matches won; if teams are still tied a playoff is organised.
(C) Champions; (O) Play-off winners; (P) Promoted; (R) Relegated

=== Period winners ===
Like before, the season was divided into three periods. The first ten matchdays together form the first period, matchdays 11 to 22 form period two and the last 12 form period three. The three period winners take part in the Belgian Second Division play-offs together with the winner of the 2014–15 Belgian Pro League relegation playoff. The winner of this final round gets to play in the 2015–16 Belgian Pro League.

During the tenth matchday on 5 October 2014, Oud-Heverlee Leuven won the first period and thereby was the first to qualify for the final round. They were joined by Sint-Truiden, who clinched the second period during matchday 21 on 21 December 2014, by obtaining a five-point lead with only one match to go. Lommel United clinched the third period title on the final matchday, as they lost to Sint-Truiden but Eupen came three goals short of overtaking them on goal difference. Eupen did however get to take part in the Belgian Second Division play-offs as Sint-Truiden were already promoted by virtue of winning the title.

==== Period 1 ====
Pos	Team	Pld	W	D	L	GF	GA	GD	Pts	Qualification
1	OH Leuven (Q)	10	7	1	2	19	10	+9	22	Belgian Second Division final round
2	Eupen	10	7	0	3	18	10	+8	21	
3	Virton	10	6	2	2	17	11	+6	20	
4	Sint-Truiden	10	6	2	2	15	11	+4	20	
5	Aalst	10	5	3	2	17	13	+4	18	

Source: Belgische Tweede Klasse
Rules for classification: 1) points; 2) number of matches won; if teams are still tied a playoff is organised.
(Q) Qualified for the phase indicated

==== Period 2 ====
Pos	Team	Pld	W	D	L	GF	GA	GD	Pts	Qualification
1	Sint-Truiden (Q)	12	11	1	0	27	8	+19	34	Belgian Second Division final round
2	Lommel	12	9	1	2	20	6	+14	28	
3	Seraing United	12	8	3	1	24	9	+15	27	
4	Virton	12	7	3	2	22	10	+12	24	
5	Eupen	12	5	6	1	17	9	+8	21	

Source: Belgische Tweede Klasse
Rules for classification: 1) points; 2) number of matches won; if teams are still tied a playoff is organised.
(Q) Qualified for the phase indicated

==== Period 3 ====
Pos	Team	Pld	W	D	L	GF	GA	GD	Pts	Qualification
1	Lommel (Q)	12	8	1	3	28	8	+20	25	Belgian Second Division final round
2	Eupen	12	8	1	3	28	11	+17	25	
3	Sint-Truiden	12	7	4	1	20	9	+11	25	
4	OH Leuven	12	7	3	2	31	14	+17	24	
5	Heist	12	6	2	4	20	18	+2	20	
5	Tubize	12	6	2	4	20	18	+2	20	

Source: Belgische Tweede Klasse
Rules for classification: 1) points; 2) number of matches won; if teams are still tied a playoff is organised.
(Q) Qualified for the phase indicated

=== Results ===
Home \ Away	AAL	ANT	DES	EUP	GEE	HEI	OHL	LOM	RCM	MON	PEM	ROE	SER	STV	TUB	VIR	W-Z	WSB
Aalst		1–0	2–2	1–2	1–2	1–0	2–3	0–3	2–1	0–1	1–1	1–1	1–0	1–2	2–3	1–0	1–0	2–2
Antwerp	0–0		1–2	1–2	2–2	2–0	1–2	0–2	0–0	1–0	4–1	1–1	1–1	0–2	0–0	1–2	3–1	1–1
Dessel	0–2	0–2		1–3	2–3	1–0	1–1	1–2	1–1	2–2	1–2	1–3	0–2	1–1	0–1	0–4	3–1	2–1
Eupen	3–1	4–1	0–1		4–0	2–3	1–1	2–1	5–1	3–0	1–1	1–1	1–1	3–0	1–0	1–0	4–1	1–2
ASV Geel	0–3	2–1	0–1	0–3		0–0	0–5	2–2	2–0	0–5	2–2	3–0	3–2	1–4	0–1	0–0	1–1	1–1
Heist	0–2	1–3	3–1	0–4	1–1		2–2	2–3	2–0	0–2	2–1	0–1	1–3	3–1	3–2	1–3	2–1	2–2
OH Leuven	0–0	2–2	3–1	2–0	2–1	0–2		0–3	3–0	0–0	3–1	4–0	0–3	2–3	1–2	1–1	7–0	4–2
Lommel	2–1	2–0	3–0	0–1	0–0	1–0	3–1		3–0	3–0	0–2	2–1	2–2	0–1	2–0	3–1	2–0	2–0
Racing Mechelen	2–4	1–2	3–2	3–1	2–4	2–1	0–1	0–6		0–3	1–3	0–2	0–2	0–2	0–5	0–3	0–1	2–2
Mons	1–1	2–1	0–0	1–1	2–0	2–0	1–1	1–1	3–0		0–0	3–0	1–3	1–1	4–0	4–0	4–0	1–1
Patro Eisden Maasmechelen	1–3	0–1	1–1	0–2	2–0	3–1	0–3	1–2	0–1	1–2		0–5	2–6	1–2	3–4	0–1	1–1	1–3
Roeselare	2–1	0–0	2–2	1–1	0–1	2–2	0–0	0–1	4–0	1–1	4–0		2–0	0–1	1–1	1–2	0–2	1–3
Seraing United	1–0	1–2	3–0	2–3	3–2	3–0	2–3	3–3	5–0	3–1	2–1	2–2		2–2	2–0	1–2	3–1	0–0
Sint-Truiden	1–1	1–0	0–0	1–0	2–1	3–1	3–2	2–1	2–1	1–0	2–2	3–0	1–2		2–0	3–0	1–0	6–0
Tubize	1–0	1–0	1–1	0–0	0–3	1–2	0–1	2–2	1–0	2–2	3–1	0–1	0–0	0–1		3–0	3–0	1–0
Virton	3–3	2–1	2–0	2–0	2–1	3–0	1–2	1–0	9–0	0–0	2–0	2–0	0–0	0–1	2–2		4–0	2–2
Woluwe-Zaventem	2–3	0–2	1–4	0–2	3–4	1–1	0–3	0–3	0–1	1–2	1–2	4–4	1–3	1–3	2–3	2–2		1–0
WS Brussels	3–3	2–4	2–1	0–1	3–0	2–3	1–1	0–0	1–1	2–0	1–1	0–1	1–1	1–1	1–0	1–0	0–0	

Updated to match(es) played on 26 April 2015. Source: Belgian Second Division
Legend: Blue = home team win; Yellow = draw; Red = away team win.

== Season statistics ==
=== Top scorers ===
Sources: Soccerway Belgian Second Division

Up to and including matches played on 26 April 2015.

Rank	Player	Club	Goals
1	(Curaçao) Romero Regales	Lommel United	22
2	(France) Florent Stevance	Seraing United	17
2	(France) Florian Taulemesse	Eupen	17
3	(Belgium) Leandro Trossard	Lommel United	16
5	(Belgium) Mathieu Cornet	Virton	15
5	(Spain) Víctor Curto	Eupen	15
5	(Belgium) Grégory Dufer	Seraing United	15
8	(Belgium) Emrullah Güvenç	Antwerp	13
8	(England) John Bostock	OH Leuven	13
10	(France) Samy Kehli	Seraing United	12

12 goals (2 players)

- (Central African Republic) Hilaire Momi (Sint-Truiden)
- (Ghana) William Owusu (Antwerp)

11 goals (4 players)

- (Democratic Republic of the Congo) Axel Bossekota (ASV Geel)
- (France) Harlem Gnohéré (Mons)
- (Belgium) Olivier Myny (Roeselare)
- (Belgium) Ivan Yagan (KRC Mechelen)

9 goals (3 players)

- (North Macedonia) Jovan Kostovski (OH Leuven)
- (Poland) Piotr Parzyszek (Sint-Truiden)
- (Belgium) Ratko Vansimpsen (Aalst)

7 goals (5 players)

- (Brazil) Daniel Oliveira (Aalst)
- (Albania) Donjet Shkodra (Aalst)
- (Belgium) Christophe Martín-Suárez (Patro Eisden Maasmechelen)
- (Belgium) Joeri Dequevy (Sint-Truiden)
- (Guinea) Lonsana Doumbouya (Tubize)

6 goals (7 players)

- (Belgium) Gianni De Neve (Aalst)
- (Belgium) Loris Brogno (Mons)
- (Belgium) Yannick Loemba (Mons)
- (France) Alexis Lafon (Virton)
- (Democratic Republic of the Congo) Raoul Ngadrira (Virton)
- (Belgium) Anthony Lorenzon (Woluwe-Zaventem)
- (Belgium) Maurice Weynants (Woluwe-Zaventem)

5 goals (11 players)

- (Belgium) Wesley Vanbelle (Aalst)
- (Belgium) Zico Gielis (ASV Geel)
- (Belgium) Prince Asubonteng (Dessel Sport)
- (Ghana) Samuel Asamoah (Eupen)
- (Spain) Rodrí (Eupen)
- (Belgium) Bart Webers (Heist)
- (Belgium) Frédéric Farin (KRC Mechelen)
- (Belgium) Wouter Scheelen (Lommel United)
- (Belgium) Roman Ferber (Mons)
- (Belgium) David Vandenbroeck (OH Leuven)
- (Belgium) Davy Sroka (Patro Eisden Maasmechelen)

4 goals (16 players)

- (France) Seïd Khiter (Antwerp)
- (Belgium) Kenneth Kerckhofs (ASV Geel)
- (Belgium) Stein Huysegems (Dessel Sport)
- (Netherlands) Ronnie Reniers (Dessel Sport)
- (Belgium) Michael Lallemand (Eupen)
- (Colombia) Jaime Alfonso Ruiz (Heist)
- (Belgium) David Wijns (Heist)
- (Belgium) Alessandro Cerigioni (OH Leuven)
- (Democratic Republic of the Congo) Ibrahim Somé (OH Leuven)
- (Belgium) Rik Impens (Roeselare)
- (Nigeria) Kennedy Nwanganga (Roeselare)
- (Belgium) Yaya Boumediene (Seraing United)
- (Belgium) Mathias Schils (Sint-Truiden)
- (Algeria) Mehdi Fennouche (Tubize)
- (Senegal) Mamadou Fall (WS Brussels)
- (Ivory Coast) Moussa Traoré (WS Brussels)

3 goals (29 players)

- (Belgium) Joren Dom (Antwerp)
- (Belgium) Yannis Augustijnen (ASV Geel)
- (Belgium) Omar Bennassar (Dessel Sport)
- (Belgium) Jari Breugelmans (Dessel Sport)
- (Belgium) Hans Hannes (Dessel Sport)
- (Spain) Luis García (Eupen)
- (Belgium) Geoffry Hairemans (Heist)
- (Belgium) Jonas Vandermarliere (Heist)
- (Belgium) Toon Lenaerts (Lommel United)
- (Belgium) Lucas Schoofs (Lommel United)
- (Brazil) Andrei (Mons)
- (Belgium) Megan Laurent (Mons)
- (Belgium) Yohan Brouckaert (OH Leuven)
- (France) Yohan Croizet (OH Leuven)
- (Belgium) Alessio Allegria (Patro Eisden Maasmechelen)
- (Belgium) Martijn Stefani (Patro Eisden Maasmechelen)
- (Belgium) Jimmy De Jonghe (Roeselare)
- (Netherlands) Stevy Okitokandjo (Roeselare)
- (France) Lilian Bochet (Seraing United)
- (Belgium) Mickaël Tirpan (Seraing United)
- (France) Yvan Erichot (Sint-Truiden)
- (Germany) Sascha Kotysch (Sint-Truiden)
- (Belgium) Mehdi Lazaar (Sint-Truiden)
- (Belgium) Leandro Bailly (Tubize)
- (Ivory Coast) Amara Diané (Tubize)
- (South Korea) Hwang Jin-sung (Tubize)
- (Belgium) Mayron De Almaida (Virton)
- (Belgium) Dorian Dessoleil (Virton)
- (Senegal) Amady Diop (WS Brussels)

2 goals (35 players)

- (Kenya) Johanna Omolo (Antwerp)
- (Belgium) Timo Cauwenberg (ASV Geel)
- (Belgium) Jo Christiaens (ASV Geel)
- (Belgium) Ben Santermans (ASV Geel)
- (Belgium) Marijn Steurs (ASV Geel)
- (Belgium) Jasper Van Der Heyden (ASV Geel)
- (Belgium) Wolke Janssens (Dessel Sport)
- (Qatar) Akram Afif (Eupen)
- (Belgium) Guy Dufour (Eupen)
- (Belgium) Erivelton (KRC Mechelen)
- (Belgium) Jason Adesanya (Lommel United)
- (Belgium) Thomas Jutten (Lommel United)
- (Belgium) Glenn Neven (Lommel United)
- (Greece) Georgios Kaminiaris (Mons)
- (Belgium) Marco Battista (Patro Eisden Maasmechelen)
- (Belgium) Ruben Janssen (Patro Eisden Maasmechelen)
- (Turkey) Taner Taktak (Patro Eisden Maasmechelen)
- (Belgium) Thomas Azevedo (OH Leuven)
- (Belgium) Kjetil Borry (Roeselare)
- (Brazil) Marcos Camozzato (Roeselare)
- (Belgium) Tom Raes (Roeselare)
- (Belgium) Jari Vandeputte (Roeselare)
- (Senegal) Moussa Gueye (Seraing United)
- (France) Pierre Baherlé (Sint-Truiden)
- (Brazil) Edmilson (Sint-Truiden)
- (Belgium) Gaëtan Hendrickx (Sint-Truiden)
- (Belgium) Rob Schoofs (Sint-Truiden)
- (France) Fabien Antunes (Virton)
- (France) Valentin Focki (Virton)
- (France) Grégory Molnar (Virton)
- (Belgium) Stef Van den Heuvel (Woulwe-Zaventem)
- (Belgium) Jente Van Ongeval (Woulwe-Zaventem)
- (Belgium) Amadou Diallo (WS Brussels)
- (Belgium) Grégory Grisez (WS Brussels)
- (Belgium) Ilias Maatoug (WS Brussels)

1 goal (83 players)

- (Belgium) Jonas Bogaerts (Aalst)
- (Belgium) Tjendo De Cuyper (Aalst)
- (Belgium) Kevin Janssens (Aalst)
- (Belgium) Philippe Janssens (Aalst)
- (Burkina Faso) Elis Koulibaly (Aalst)
- (Belgium) Jonas De Roeck (Antwerp)
- (Belgium) Anthony Di Lallo (Antwerp)
- (Belgium) Jannes Vansteenkiste (Antwerp)
- (Netherlands) Kevin Tano (Antwerp)
- (Belgium) Geert Berben (ASV Geel)
- (Nigeria) Onyeka Onwuekelu (ASV Geel)
- (Belgium) Lens Annab (ASV Geel)
- (Belgium) Wout Bastiaens (Dessel Sport)
- (Belgium) Roy Meeus (Dessel Sport)
- (Belgium) Kurt Remen (Dessel Sport)
- (France) Kevin Tapoko (Dessel Sport)
- (Belgium) Nick Van Belle (Dessel Sport)
- (Belgium) Wouter Vosters (Dessel Sport)
- (Senegal) Stephen Babalola (Eupen)
- (Nigeria) Anthony Bassey (Eupen)
- (Belgium) Cor Gillis (Heist)
- (Belgium) Tarik Dahman (Heist)
- (Belgium) Andreas Luckermans (Heist)
- (Angola) Michel Nkuman (Heist)
- (Belgium) Yannick Rymenants (Heist)
- (Belgium) Jeroen Vanderputte (Heist)
- (Belgium) Seppe Brulmans (KRC Mechelen)
- (Belgium) Daan Debouver (KRC Mechelen)
- (Belgium) Rachid Hmouda (KRC Mechelen)
- (Belgium) Bert Tuteleers (KRC Mechelen)
- (Belgium) Daan Vaesen (KRC Mechelen)
- (Belgium) Ken Debauve (Lommel United)
- (Belgium) Bart Goossens (Lommel United)
- (Belgium) Yassin Gueroui (Lommel United)
- (Belgium) Jelle Rykx (Lommel United)
- (Belgium) Sam Vanaken (Lommel United)
- (Belgium) Sami Lkoutbi (Mons)
- (Burkina Faso) Mahamoudou Kéré (Mons)
- (France) Jérémy Sapina (Mons)
- (France) Jean-Christophe Vergerolle (Mons)
- (Belgium) Simon Bracke (OH Leuven)
- (Belgium) Nicolas Delporte (OH Leuven)
- (France) Romain Reynaud (OH Leuven)
- (Belgium) Giuseppe Rossini (OH Leuven)
- (Belgium) Ben Yagan (OH Leuven)
- (Belgium) Kenneth Van Goethem (OH Leuven)
- (Belgium) Samir Bouhriss (Patro Eisden Maasmechelen)
- (Belgium) Sébastien Gonzatti (Patro Eisden Maasmechelen)
- (Belgium) Koen Hustinx (Patro Eisden Maasmechelen)
- (Belgium) Jean-François Mbuba (Roeselare)
- (France) Mickael Seoudi (Roeselare)
- (Belgium) Jeroen Vanthournout (Roeselare)
- (Belgium) Petar Bojović (Seraing United)
- (Italy) Alessandro Iandoli (Sint-Truiden)
- (Morocco) Faycal Rherras (Sint-Truiden)
- (Belgium) Pierre Gevaert (Tubize)
- (Belgium) Quentin Laurent (Tubize)
- (France) Philippe Liard (Tubize)
- (France) Sofiane Kheyari (Tubize)
- (Belgium) Lou Wallaert (Tubize)
- (Belgium) Nicolas Day (Virton)
- (France) Djaïd Kasri (Virton)
- (Benin) Arsène Menessou (Virton)
- (Belgium) Mohamed Mrabet (Virton)
- (France) Dylan Suray (Virton)
- (France) Johan Caurant (Woluwe-Zaventem)
- (Belgium) Julien Charlier (Woluwe-Zaventem)
- (Belgium) Joren Dehond (Woluwe-Zaventem)
- (Belgium) Denis Dessaer (Woluwe-Zaventem)
- (Belgium) Axel Dheur (Woluwe-Zaventem)
- (Democratic Republic of the Congo) Nehemie Muzembo (Woluwe-Zaventem)
- (Belgium) Ugo Nwadikwa (Woluwe-Zaventem)
- (Belgium) Dylan Vanwelkenhuysen (Woluwe-Zaventem)
- (France) Issa Baradji (WS Brussels)
- (Algeria) Habib Bellaïd (WS Brussels)
- (France) Mehdi Courgnaud (WS Brussels)
- (Belgium) Wilfried Dalmat (WS Brussels)
- (Belgium) Amadou Ti (WS Brussels)
- (Belgium) Théo Di Rosa (WS Brussels)
- (France) Karim El Hany (WS Brussels)
- (Belgium) Samuel Fabris (WS Brussels)
- (Belgium) Jérémy Obin (WS Brussels)
- (Senegal) Noël Soumah (WS Brussels)

1 Own goal (14 players)

- (Belgium) Jonas De Roeck (Antwerp, scored for Eupen)
- (Belgium) Mathias Lievens (Aalst, scored for Eupen)
- (Belgium) Wesley Vanbelle (Aalst, scored for Virton)
- (Belgium) Gertjan Martens (Antwerp, scored for Mons)
- (Belgium) Yannis Augustijnen (ASV Geel, scored for Sint-Truiden)
- (Belgium) Kurt Remen (Dessel Sport, scored for Patro Eisden Maasmechelen)
- (Belgium) Jan Van den Bergh (Heist, scored for Seraing United)
- (Belgium) Jeroen Vanderputte (Heist, scored for Virton)
- (Belgium) Jentle Gaethofs (Patro Eisden Maasmechelen, scored for Lommel United)
- (Belgium) David Vandenbroeck (OH Leuven, scored for Virton)
- (Belgium) Tom Raes (Roeselare, scored for Heist)
- (France) Yoann Grosperrin (Tubize, scored for WS Brussels)
- (Belgium) Thomas Regnier (Woluwe-Zaventem, scored for Eupen)
- (Algeria) Habib Bellaïd (WS Brussels, scored for Eendracht Aalst)

=== Hat-tricks ===
Key
^{4}	Player scored four goals
*	The home team

Player	Nationality	For	Against	Result	Date
Ivan Yagan	Belgium	KRC Mechelen*	Dessel Sport	3–2	31 August 2014
Samy Kehli	France	Seraing United	Patro Eisden Maasmechelen*	6–2	3 September 2014
Harlem Gnohéré^{4}	France	Mons	ASV Geel*	5–0	13 September 2014
Víctor Curto	Spain	Eupen*	KRC Mechelen	5–1	23 January 2015
Thomas Azevedo	Belgium	OH Leuven	ASV Geel*	5–0	28 February 2015
Axel Bossekota	Belgium	ASV Geel	Dessel Sport*	3–2	23 March 2015
Leandro Trossard	Belgium	Lommel United	KRC Mechelen*	6–0	23 March 2015
Mathieu Cornet	Belgium	Virton*	KRC Mechelen	9–0	4 April 2015
Thomas Azevedo	Belgium	OH Leuven*	Woluwe-Zaventem	7–0	19 April 2015
