= 2015–16 Belgian Cup =

Tournament details
- Country: Belgium
- Dates: 24 July 2015 – 20 March 2016
- Teams: 294

Final positions
- Champions: Standard Liège (7th title)
- Runners-up: Club Brugge

Tournament statistics
- Matches played: 295

The 2015–16 Belgian Cup, called the Croky Cup for sponsorship reasons, is the 61st season of Belgian's annual football cup competition. The competition began on 24 July 2015 and ended with the final in March 2016. The winners of the competition will qualify for the 2016–17 UEFA Europa League Group Stage. Club Brugge were the defending champions.

== Competition format ==
The competition consists of ten rounds. The first seven rounds are held as single-match elimination rounds. When tied after 90 minutes in the first three rounds, penalties are taken immediately. In rounds four to seven and the quarterfinals, when tied after 90 minutes first an extra time period of 30 minutes are played, then penalties are taken if still necessary. The semifinals will be played over two legs, where the team winning on aggregate advances. The final will be played as a single match.

Teams enter the competition in different rounds, based upon their 2014–15 league affiliation. Teams from the fourth-level Promotion or lower began in Round 1. Third Division teams entered in Round 3, with Second Division teams joining in the following round. Teams from the Belgian First Division enter in Round 6.

Round	Clubs remaining	Clubs involved	Winners from previous round	New entries this round	Leagues entering at this round
Round 1	294	224	none	224	Levels 4 to 8 in football league pyramid
Round 2	182	112	112	none	none
Round 3	126	92	56	36	Belgian Third Division
Round 4	80	64	46	18	Belgian Second Division + 1 Belgian Third Division team
Round 5	48	32	32	none	none
Round 6	32	32	16	16	Belgian Pro League
Round 7	16	16	16	none	none
Quarter-Finals	8	8	8	none	none
Semi-Finals	4	4	4	none	none
Final	2	2	2	none	none

== First round ==
This round of matches was played on 24, 25 & 26 July 2015 and includes teams of levels 4 to 8 in football league pyramid. Four teams from the lowest division participated, namely KFC Heultje, Korbeek Sport, K. Flandria Dorne and CS Wépionnais. Only CS Wépionnais advanced to become the lowest-ranked team in the second round.

Tie no	Home team (tier)	Score	Away team (tier)
1.	KFC Jong Vlaanderen Kruibeke (5)	2–1	KVE Drongen (5)
2.	SK Kampelaar (6)	0–3	KSK Halle (4)
3.	KFC Heultje (8)	0–5	FC Mariekerke (5)
4.	K Merksplas SK (6)	1–6	KVV Vosselaar (4)
5.	Royal Marloie Sport (5)	2–3	R Aywaille FC (4)
6.	RFC Grand-Leez (5)	4–1	RAS Lessines-Ollignies (6)
7.	Herk-de-Stad FC (5)	1–0	K Bilzerse Waltwilder VV (4)
8.	EC Jamoigne-Chiny (6)	0–6	RDC Cointe-Liège (4)
9.	KESK Leopoldsburg (4)	1–2	KSK Bree (5)
10.	KVK Ninove (4)	4–1	SV Voorde (5)
11.	KV Tervuren (6)	2–2 (2–4 p)	Stade Everois RC (7)
12.	KVV Thes Sport Tessenderlo (4)	1–1 (7–6 p)	K Zonhoven Vlug en Vrij (5)
13.	Wolvertem SC (4)	6–0	FC Rillaar Sport (6)
14.	KFC Zwarte Leeuw (4)	5–0	FC Walem (7)
15.	R.O.C. de Charleroi-Marchienne (4)	9–0	RUS Flobecquoise (6)
16.	RC Lebbeke (5)	1–1 (3–4 p)	KVV Zelzate (5)
17.	RAEC Sclayn (6)	2–4	CS Wépionnais (8)
18.	Spouwen-Mopertingen (4)	8–0	KVK Beringen (5)
19.	Royal Stade Waremmien FC (4)	3–0	ROC Meix-devant-Virton (5)
20.	SV Aartselaar (7)	0–4	White Star Schorvoort Turnhout (6)
21.	KSV White Star Adinkerke (4)	2–1	KSK Oostnieuwkerke (5)
22.	Antonia FC (5)	0–1	Witgoor Sport Dessel (5)
23.	FC Apollo 74 Gellik (5)	0–5 FF (Note: FC Apollo 74 Gellik folded as a team just before the start of the season, as such Kattenbos automatically progressed to round 2.)	KFC Kattenbos Sport (6)
24.	KE Appelterre-Eichem (5)	1–2	Royal Football Club Wetteren (4)
25.	RSC Beaufays (5)	1–1 (3–2 p)	RFC Warnant (5)
26.	ASC Berchem (7)	3–2	KFC Wambeek (7)
27.	Royale Entente Bertrigeoise (4)	4–2	RSS Salmienne (7)
28.	KAC Betekom (4)	3–1	KCV Haacht (7)
29.	KFC Bevel (6)	1–1 (3–4 p)	K Zwaluwen Olmen (7)
30.	Standard FC Bièvre (5)	0–6	Royale Jeunesse Aischoise (5)
31.	WIK Boekel (7)	0–4	K.F.C. Eendracht Zele (4)
32.	PAC Buzet (5)	1–1 (5–4 p)	OC Nismes (5)
33.	Racing Charleroi Couillet Fleurus (4)	9–2	Entente Châtelet (7)
34.	Chevetogne Football (6)	1–1 (4–2 p)	R. Jeunesse Rochefortoise (5)
35.	KSC City Pirates (4)	1–2	KFC Brasschaat (6)
36.	SVV Damme (4)	3–0	KFC Meulebeke (5)
37.	SC Dikkelvenne (4)	3–2	KVK Svelta Melsele (5)
38.	KFC Duffel (4)	5–1	KFC Beekhoek Sport (6)
39.	Eendracht Termien (5)	4–1	HIH Hoepertingen (5)
40.	KFC Eppegem (5)	14–0	R La Hulpe SC (7)
41.	RUS Ethe Belmont (5)	2–1	FC JL Arlonaise (4)
42.	K. Flandria Dorne (8)	0–7	Lutlommel VV (5)
43.	Racing FC Fosses (5)	1–3	Châtelet SC (4)
44.	Francs Borains (4)	2–1	Arquet FC (5)
45.	FC Ganshoren (4)	5–0	US d'Ophain (7)
46.	Royal Géants Athois (4)	0–5	KVC Zwevegem Sport (5)
47.	RSC Habay-la-Neuve (5)	8–0	R. Olympic Harre (6)
48.	RC Hades (4)	5–0	KMR Biesen (7)
49.	ASC Havinnes (6)	0–3	CS Pays Vert Ostiches Ath (6)
50.	KFC Helson Helchteren (5)	0–2	KVK Wellen (4)
51.	AC Hombourg (6)	2–0	Pontisse Cité FC (7)
52.	K.Daring Huvo Jeuk (5)	2–2 (7–8 p)	VV Brustem Centrum (5)
53.	AEDEC Hyon (6)	1–2	Royal Albert Quévy-Mons (5)
54.	GD Ingooigem (7)	0–3	Sporting West Harelbeke (4)
55.	RJS Taminoise (4)	7–0	JS Eghezée (6)
56.	KGR Katelijne (5)	4–2	K. Lyra T.S.V. (4)

Tie no	Home team (tier)	Score	Away team (tier)
57.	JS Kemexhe Crisnée (7)	0–4	RFC Trooz (6)
58.	Knokke FC (4)	7–0	KSK Vlamertinge (5)
59.	Korbeek Sport (8)	0–2	Sportief Rotselaar (7)
60.	K.V. Turnhout (4)	5–0	K.VV Duffel (5)
61.	WIK Eine (5)	6–1	KVV Laarne-Kalken (6)
62.	ROC Rochois (5)	0–1	FC Richelle United (4)
63.	US Hesbignonne Limontoise (6)	6–0	Royal Cercle Sportif Verlaine II (8)
64.	URS Lixhe-Lanaye (6)	3–2	RES Couvin-Mariembourg (4)
65.	KSK De Jeugd Lovendegem	0–3	K.S.K. Ronse
66.	RUS Loyers	6–2	Royale Jeunesse Aischoise II
67.	KSK Maldegem	0–2	SK Berlare
68.	RUS Marbehan	1–2	R. RC Mormont
69.	KFC Merelbeke	3–2	SK Lochristi
70.	RFC Messancy (Note: US Martelangeoise was originally drawn against Solières but replaced by Messancy for unclear reasons.)	0–5	Solières Sport
71.	RAS Monceau	5–1	AC Le Roeulx
72.	Association Montkainoise	8–0	ARSE Floreffe
73.	UR Namur	3–1	RUS Gold Star Liège
74.	KFC Nijlen	1–0	K. Berg en Dal VV
75.	OMS Ingelmunster	7–0	Sk Nieuwkerke
76.	Royal Ougrée FC	5–1	Royal Club Sportif Stavelotain II
77.	RSC Pâturages	0–1	Péruwelz FC
78.	US de Pesche	0–1	RUS Courcelles
79.	KFC Peutie	0–6	R. Leopold FC
80.	K. Racing Waregem	2–2 (6–5 p)	SK Eernegem
81.	RFC 1912 Raeren	0–0 (0–3 p)	Royal Club Sportif Stavelotain
82.	RUS Rebecquoise	3–1	KFC Lennik
83.	Rode Duivels Zoutleeuw	1–5	Olympia SC Wijgmaal
84.	Royal Racing Club de Waterloo	3–0	Verbroedering Beersel Drogenbos
85.	KSV Rumbeke	2–0	KSV De Ruiter Roeselare
86.	RFC Sart-lez-Spa	1–1 (3–4 p)	RES Gesvoise
87.	KFC Sporting Sint-Gillis-Waas	3–0	Rangers Opdorp
88.	RFC Spy	1–1 (4–3 p)	AS Fontainoise
89.	KOVC Sterrebeek	4–1	Renaissance Club Schaerbeek
90.	R.F.C. Tournai	5–0	K. Blauwvoet Otegem
91.	FC Union Walhorn 1971	1–4	RFC Meux
92.	ES Vaux-Noville	2–0	ESC Poupehan
93.	RCS Verlaine	4–0	Royale Espérance Rossignol
94.	R.C.S. Verviétois	0–5 FF (Note: The first team of Verviétois folded just before the season, as such Champlonnaise automatically progressed to round 2.)	RES Champlonnaise
95.	K Vlijtingen Vlug en Vrij	1–0	KVV Weerstand Koersel
96.	VK Westhoek	4–0	K Eendracht Wervik
97.	KSC Wielsbeke	0–1	Sassport Boezinge
98.	KVC Wingene	4–0	KWSC Lauwe
99.	K Wuustwezel FC	3–3 (7–8 p)	KFC Lille
100.	Zeveren Sportief	3–5	KFC Evergem Center
101.	KSK Voorwaarts Zwevezele	5–1	VV Westkapelle
102.	Verbroedering Zwijndrecht	3–0	KFC Ranst
103.	RRC Longlier	3–0	R.E.S. Durbuysienne
104.	KFC Sint-Lenaarts	2–0	VC Herentals
105.	ES Villance	1–9	R. US Givry
106.	RWDM47	1–0	Avanti Stekene
107.	FC Pepingen	3–2	KVC Jong Lede
108.	Royal Dinant Football Club	2–5	JS Fizoise
109.	SV Wevelgem City	3–1	KSC Toekomst Menen
110.	RCS Ohain	2–1	R. Union Rixensartoise
111.	FC Rapid Symphorinois	4–0	JS Isiéroise
112.	REAL Neeroeteren-Maaseik	0–7	KFC Esperanza Pelt

== Second round ==
These round of matches were played on 1 and 2 August 2015. No new teams entered at this round, CS Wépionnais from the 8th level was the lowest ranked team but was eliminated in this round.

Tie no	Home team (tier)	Score	Away team (tier)
1.	KVK Ninove	1–2	KFC Sporting Sint-Gillis Waas
2.	KFC Sint-Lenaarts	1–2	KVV Vosselaar
3.	KESK Leopoldsburg	1–0	K Vlijtingen Vlug en Vrij
4.	KVV Thes Sport Tessenderlo	2–3	Spouwen-Mopertingen
5.	R.F.C. Tournai	2–0	Sassport Boezinge
6.	KFC Zwarte Leeuw	3–2	KFC Brasschaat
7.	Royale Entente Bertrigeoise	1–0	RUS Ethe Belmont
8.	Racing Charleroi Couillet Fleurus	3–2	RAS Monceau
9.	Châtelet SC	3–5	Association Montkainoise
10.	RDC Cointe Liège	6–1	RRC Mormont
11.	RUS Courcelles	2–3	R.O.C. de Charleroi-Marchienne
12.	KFC Duffel	1–1 (9–8 p)	FC Mariekerke
13.	KFC Evergem Center	3–4	SK Berlare
14.	Royal Albert Quévy-Mons	3–1	FC Rapid Symphorinois
15.	R. US Givry	3–0	RSC Habay La Neuve
16.	RFC Grand-Leez	0–3	Francs Borains
17.	KSK Halle	1–1 (5–4 p)	KOVC Sterrebeek
18.	Herk-de-Stad FC	0–0 (7–6 p)	VV Brustem Centrum
19.	RJS Taminoise	1–4	UR Namur
20.	KGR Katelijne	2–1	KFC Lille
21.	KFC Kattenbos Sport	0–1	RC Hades
22.	Royal Knokke Football Club	2–0	OMS Ingelmunster
23.	K.V. Turnhout	1–1 (3–4 p)	KFC Nijlen
24.	WIK Eine	1–3	K.F.C. Eendracht Zele
25.	USH Limontoise	2–2 (3–4 p)	Royal Club Sportif Stavelotain
26.	RUS Loyers	0–4	URS Lixhe-Lanaye
27.	Lutlommel VV	1–1 (4–2 p)	Eendracht Termien
28.	KFC Merelbeke	3–2	KFC Jong Vlaanderen Kruibeke

Tie no	Home team (tier)	Score	Away team (tier)
29.	RFC Meux	4–0	Royale Jeunesse Aischoise
30.	RCS Ohain	1–6	KAC Betekom
31.	K Zwaluwen Olmen	4–1	Verbroedering Zwijndrecht
32.	CS Pays Vert Ostiches Ath	1–0	RFC Spy
33.	R Ougrée FC	3–1	CS Wépionnais
34.	Péruwelz FC	3–2	PAC Buzet
35.	K. Racing Waregem	6–0	KSV White Star Adinkerke
36.	RUS Rebecquoise	1–1 (15–16 p)	Wolvertem SC
37.	Sportief Rotselaar	5–1	ASC Berchem
38.	RRC de Waterloo	2–1	KFC Eppegem
39.	KSV Rumbeke	1–1 (2–4 p)	SVV Damme
40.	Solières Sport	2–4	FC Richelle United
41.	RWDM47	2–1	SC Dikkelvenne
42.	Football Club de Trooz	1–1 (4–5 p)	RSC Beaufays
43.	Léopold FC	4–3	Stade Everois
44.	ES Vaux-Noville	0–1	RES Champlonnaise
45.	R Stade Waremmien FC	1–1 (3–4 p)	Royal Cercle Sportif Verlaine
46.	KVK Wellen	1–6	KFC Esperanza Pelt
47.	VK Westhoek	2–2 (1–3 p)	K. S.K. Voorwaarts Zwevezele
48.	Royal Football Club Wetteren	0–0 (1–4 p)	FC Pepingen
49.	Olympia SC Wijgmaal	3–1	FC Ganshoren
50.	KVC Wingene	1–2	Sporting West Harelbeke
51.	K Witgoor Sport Dessel	1–1 (5–3 p)	White Star Schorvoort Turnhout
52.	KVV Zelzate	0–0 (3–4 p)	K.S.K. Ronse
53.	KVC Zwevegem Sport	0–0 (1–4 p)	SV Wevelgem City
54.	RRC Longlier	1–0	Royal Aywaille Football Club
55.	Chevetogne Football	3–0	RES Gesvoise
56.	JS Fizoise	1–1 (6–5 p)	AC Hombourg

== Third round ==
This round of matches was played on 7, 8 and 9 August 2015. Teams playing in the Belgian Third Division joined at this stage except for K.V. Woluwe-Zaventem who were given a bye to the fourth round. Lowest ranked teams in this round were Sportief Rotselaar and K. Zwaluwen Olmen playing at level 7 of the football pyramid.

Tie no	Home team (tier)	Score	Away team (tier)
1.	Spouwen-Mopertingen	2–1 (Note: Match played on the terrain of FCO Beerschot Wilrijk.)	FCO Beerschot Wilrijk
2.	KFC Oosterzonen Oosterwijk	6–1	SV Wevelgem City
3.	KFC Sparta Petegem	1–3	R.O.C. de Charleroi-Marchienne
4.	KVV Vosselaar	2–2 (2–4 p)	KFC Izegem
5.	RC Hades	2–2 (5–4 p)	KSV Temse
6.	KFC Nijlen	1–1 (4–5 p)	KSV Bornem
7.	Royale Entente Bertrigeoise	1–5	R. Cappellen F.C.
8.	Hoogstraten VV	1–0	Lutlommel VV
9.	RUW Ciney	2–0	KAC Betekom
10.	SC Eendracht Aalst	1–1 (2–4 p)	KFC Duffel
11.	RES Acrenoise	4–3	URS Lixhe-Lanaye
12.	K. Berchem Sport	2–2 (3–5 p)	Olympia SC Wijgmaal
13.	K Bocholter VV	3–1	Royal Club Sportif Stavelotain
14.	K. Rupel Boom F.C.	1–0	RRC de Waterloo
15.	RES Champlonnaise	0–1	FC Richelle United
16.	SVV Damme	0–0 (2–4 p)	Léopold FC
17.	K. Diegem Sport	0–0 (4–3 p)	R.F.C. Tournai
18.	K.F.C. Eendracht Zele	1–1 (5–6 p)	KFC Merelbeke
19.	Francs Borains	0–1	KFC Esperanza Pelt
20.	KSC Grimbergen	8–1	Sportief Rotselaar
21.	FC Gullegem	2–0	KGR Katelijne
22.	Herk-de-Stad FC	1–3	R. US Givry
23.	Knokke FC	2–1	Royal Sprimont Comblain Sport
24.	K.R.C. Mechelen	2–0	Chevetogne Football
25.	KESK Leopoldsburg	1–5	K.R.C. Gent-Zeehaven
26.	RFC Meux	4–0	Royal Albert Quévy-Mons
27.	Association Montkainoise	1–1 (5–6 p)	UR Namur
28.	K. Zwaluwen Olmen	1–3	K Olsa Brakel
29.	CS Pays Vert Ostiches Ath	1–2	RFC Liège
30.	K.S.V. Oudenaarde	2–2 (6–7 p)	Royal Daring Club de Cointe-Liège
31.	Tempo Overijse	3–0	RSC Beaufays
32.	FC Pepingen	1–3	UR La Louvière Centre
33.	Peruwelz FC	1–5	Racing Charleroi Couillet Fleurus
34.	K. Racing Waregem	1–3	R. Wallonia Walhain Chaumont-Gistoux
35.	KVC Sint-Eloois-Winkel Sport	6–0	R Ougree FC
36.	Sportkring Sint-Niklaas	4–5	KSK Halle
37.	KFC Sporting Sint-Gillis-Waas	2–0	JS Fizoise
38.	RWDM47	1–0	K.S.K. Ronse
39.	Sporting West Harelbeke	0–1	K.V.K. Tienen
40.	Torhout 1992 KM	0–1	SK Berlare
41.	RCS Verlaine	1–3	K. Londerzeel S.K.
42.	K Witgoor Sport Dessel	0–3	F.C. Verbroedering Dender Eendracht Hekelgem
43.	K.Wolvertem SC	0–0 (1–4 p)	RFC Union La Calamine
44.	KFC Zwarte Leeuw	2–1	K.S.C. Hasselt
45.	K. S.K. Voorwaarts Zwevezele	3–5	K.F.C. Vigor Wuitens Hamme
46.	R.R.C. Longlier	1–3	RRC Hamoir

== Fourth round ==
This round of matches was played on 15 and 16 August 2015. Teams playing in the Belgian Second Division joined at this stage. Lowest ranked team in this round was KFC Merelbeke playing at level 5 of the football pyramid.

Tie no	Home team (tier)	Score	Away team (tier)
1.	SK Berlare	0–0 (4–2 p)	K.F.C. Vigor Wuitens Hamme
2.	KSC Grimbergen	0–2 (Note: Match played on the terrain of Dessel Sport.)	K.F.C. Dessel Sport
3.	A.F.C. Tubize	2–0	R.O.C. de Charleroi-Marchienne
4.	R.E. Virton	1–0	RWDM47
5.	K.M.S.K. Deinze	2–1	Hoogstraten VV
6.	AS Verbroedering Geel	2–2 (5–6 p)	Royal Knokke FC
7.	K Bocholter VV	5–3 (a.e.t.)	KFC Sporting Sint-Gillis-Waas
8.	KSV Bornem	3–1	FC Richelle United
9.	Cercle Brugge K.S.V.	2–0	RUW Ciney
10.	RDC Cointe Liège	2–3	RRC Hamoir
11.	F.C. Verbroedering Dender Eendracht Hekelgem	2–0	Tempo Overijse
12.	KFC Duffel	2–1	Olympia SC Wijgmaal
13.	K.A.S. Eupen	4–1	R. Cappellen F.C.
14.	KFC Izegem	1–3	Royal Antwerp F.C.
15.	K.R.C. Mechelen	1–2	K. Londerzeel S.K.
16.	Lierse S.K.	2–1	K. Rupel Boom F.C.
17.	Lommel United	3–0	RUS Givry
18.	KFC Merelbeke	5–0	RFC Union La Calamine
19.	RFC Meux	0–1 (a.e.t.)	R. White Star Bruxelles
20.	KFC Oosterzonen Oosterwijk	3–0	Léopold FC
21.	K. Patro Eisden Maasmechelen	1–0	KFC Esperanza Pelt
22.	Seraing United	1–1 (5–4 p)	KVC Sint-Eloois-Winkel Sport
23.	Spouwen-Mopertingen	3–2	K. Diegem Sport
24.	Royale Union Saint-Gilloise	3–0	UR Namur
25.	K.V.V. Coxyde	3–0	FC Gullegem
26.	R. Wallonia Walhain Chaumont-Gistoux	2–1	Sportkring Sint-Niklaas
27.	K.V. Woluwe-Zaventem (Note: As only 17 teams play in the 2015-16 Belgian Second Division due to the demotion of Eendracht Aalst after not receiving a licence, one Belgian Third Division team was allowed to skip the third round and start in round four to fill the vacant spot. Woluwe-Zaventem was chosen as highest league finisher of the previous season.)	2–4	RC Hades
28.	KFC Zwarte Leeuw	1–3 (a.e.t.)	R. ES Acrenoise
29.	Racing Charleroi Couillet Fleurus	2–1	UR La Louvière Centre
30.	RFC Liège	2–2 (4–2 p)	K.S.V. Roeselare
31.	Heist	2–0	Gent-Zeehaven
32.	K Olsa Brakel	2–1	Tienen-Hageland

== Fifth Round ==
This round of matches was played on 22 and 23 August 2015. Lowest ranked team in this round was KFC Merelbeke playing at level 5 of the football pyramid.

22 August 2015	Virton	0–1 (a.e.t.)	Bocholt	Virton
			Vanwelkenhuysen 112'	Stadium: Stade Yvan Georges; Referee: Maxime Smeets

22 August 2015	Dessel Sport	2–0	Bornem	Dessel
				Stadium: Armand Melis Stadion; Referee: Bert Daemen

22 August 2015	Berlare	1–3	Eupen	Berlare
	Heirwegh 37'		Taulemesse 35', 89'; Curto 67'	Stadium: Puitenstadion; Referee: Roel Bensch

22 August 2015	Cercle Brugge	2–0	RFC Liège	Bruges
	Haroun 20'; Doumbouya 47'			Stadium: Jan Breydel Stadium; Referee: Carlos Manuel Alho-Guerreiro

22 August 2015	Deinze	3–1	Tubize	Deinze
	Libbrecht 18'; Mezine 54' (pen.), 90+3'		Garlito y Romo 88'	Stadium: Burgemeester Van de Wielestadion; Referee: Jurgen Brinckman

23 August 2015	Duffel	1–3	Union SG	Duffel
	Vaesen 64'		Wallaert 38'; Fauré 52'; Mezghrani 67' (o.g.)	Stadium: Gemeentelijk sportcentrum Referee: Bert Put

23 August 2015	Coxyde	1–0	Merelbeke	Koksijde
	De Cuyper 72'			Stadium: Henri Houtsaegerstadion; Referee: Robin Lefever

23 August 2015	Londerzeel	0–1 (a.e.t.)	Lommel United	Londerzeel
			Bertjens 94'	Stadium: Burgemeester Albert Lambertsstadion; Referee: Philippe Vinche

23 August 2015	Olsa Brakel	3–2	Heist	Brakel
	Delie 7', 60' van Waeyenberghe 77'		Van Den Bergh 47', 57'	Stadium: Terrein Parkweg; Referee: Tom Ottevaere

23 August 2015	Patro Eisden Maasmechelen	5–0	Hades	Maasmechelen
	Farin; Sroka (pen.); Wala Zock ? (o.g.)			Stadium: Patro Stadion; Referee: Davy Davy

23 August 2015	Deux Acren	2–0	Hamoir	Deux-Acren
	Sakanoko 66' (pen.), 88'			Stadium: Stade des Camomilles; Referee: Ken Vermeiren

23 August 2015	Antwerp	2–1	Seraing United	Deurne
	Hairemans 59'; Binst 71'		Sambu 34'	Stadium: Bosuilstadion; Referee: Lawrence Visser

23 August 2015	Knokke	2–4 (a.e.t.)	FCV Dender EH	Knokke-Heist
	Neve 60', 82'		Pé 34'; Fernández 58', 119'; Dimbala 97'	Stadium: Olivier Sportstadion; Referee: Tim Pots

23 August 2015	Spouwen-Mopertingen	3–2 (a.e.t.)	Oosterzonen Oosterwijk	Mopertingen
	van Oudenhove 16'; Diallo 99'; Timmermans 105'		Placca 90', 110'	Stadium: Complex Blookstraat; Referee: Walter Gijsen

23 August 2015	Wallonia Walhain	4–1	Charleroi Couillet Fleurus	Walhain
	Benazzi 2', 22', 73'; Lemepereur 72'		Utshinga 35' (pen.)	Stadium: Stade des Boscailles; Referee: Yves Verslycken

23 August 2015	WS Bruxelles	2–0	Lierse	Brussels
	Somé 80'; Grisez 89'			Stadium: Edmond Machtens Stadium; Referee: Dieter De Naeyer

== 6th Round ==
These round of matches were played on September 22 and 23. All 16 Belgian Pro League teams entered at this round and received seed status, allowing them to avoid each other. Lowest ranked team in this round was Spouwen-Mopertingen playing in the Belgian Fourth Division.

22 September 2015	Zulte Waregem	2–0	Union SG (II)	Waregem
20:00	Buyl 3'; Kaya 9'			Stadium: Regenboogstadion; Referee: Wim Smet

22 September 2015	Westerlo	3–2	Cercle Brugge (II)	Westerlo
20:00	Višņakovs 7', 90'; Hyland 85'		Maertens 51'; Yagan 61' (pen.)	Stadium: Het Kuipje

23 September 2015	Lokeren	6–2	Deux Acren (III)	Lokeren (Note: Fixture reversed from original draw.)
20:00	Marić 15' (pen.); Ghadir 29', 42'; Starzyński 38'; Abdurahimi 61'; Ansah 86'		Sakanoko 52'; Kabeya 90+1'	Stadium: Daknamstadion

23 September 2015	Anderlecht	3–1	Spouwen-Mopertingen (IV)	Anderlecht
20:00	Tielemans 65' (pen.); Dendoncker 89'; Suárez 90+2'		Diallo 75'	Stadium: Constant Vanden Stock Stadium

23 September 2015	Genk	5–2	Dessel Sport (II)	Genk
20:00	Ünal 9'; Kabasele 16'; Dewaest 27'; Bailey 45+3'; De Camargo 70'		Breugelmans 60'; Hannes 62' (pen.)	Stadium: Cristal Arena

23 September 2015	Kortrijk	5–0	Olsa Brakel (III)	Kortrijk (Note: Fixture reversed from original draw.)
20:00	De Smet 5', 71'; Kiš 75'; Lallemand 82'; Kage 90+1'			Stadium: Guldensporen Stadion

23 September 2015	KV Mechelen	1–0	WS Bruxelles (II)	Mechelen
20:00	Cocalić 22'			Stadium: Argosstadion Achter de Kazerne

23 September 2015	Waasland-Beveren	2–1	FCV Dender EH (II)	Beveren
20:00	Moulin 35'; Nabab 68'		Dimbala 44'	Stadium: Freethiel Stadion

23 September 2015	Charleroi	3–0	Wallonia Walhain (III)	Charleroi
20:30	Steens 18' (o.g.); Pollet 42'; Perbet 86'			Stadium: Stade du Pays de Charleroi (Note: Fixture reversed from original draw.)

23 September 2015	Gent	3–0	Eupen (II)	Ghent
20:30	Pedersen 42'; Raman 63'; Van der Bruggen 90+3'			Stadium: Ghelamco Arena

23 September 2015	Deinze (II)	0–2	Mouscron-Péruwelz	Deinze
20:30			Marreco 32'; Jakoliš 90+2'	Stadium: Burgemeester Van de Wielestadion

23 September 2015	Patro Eisden Maasmechelen (II)	0–4	Club Brugge	Maasmechelen
20:30			Vanaken 3', 61'; Meunier 26'; Vossen 37'	Stadium: Patro Stadion

23 September 2015	Sint-Truiden	1–0	Bocholt (III)	Sint-Truiden
20:30	Dompé 73'			Stadium: Stayen

23 September 2015	OH Leuven	3–2	Lommel United (II)	Leuven
20:30	Trossard 6'; Cerigioni 35'; Regales 40'		Scheelen 33'; Bertjens 53'	Stadium: Den Dreef

23 September 2015	Coxyde (II)	2–3	Standard Liège	Koksijde
20:30	De Cuyper 13'; Ternier 49' (pen.)		Teixeira 12', 21'; Brüls 81'	Stadium: Henri Houtsaegerstadion

23 September 2015	KV Oostende	0–2	Antwerp (II)	Ostend
20:45			Owusu 22'; Biset 71'	Stadium: Albertpark

== 7th Round ==
The draw was made on 23 September 2015 and the matches took place on 1, 2 and 3 December 2015. Antwerp from the Belgian Second Division was the only team not playing in the Belgian Pro League still present at this stage.

1 December 2015	Gent	1–0	Zulte Waregem	Ghent
20:30	Raman 20'	Report		Stadium: Ghelamco Arena

2 December 2015	Genk	1–1 (a.e.t.) (5–4 p)	Charleroi	Genk
20:00	Buffel 28'	Report	Tainmont 73'	Stadium: Cristal Arena
	Penalties
	Buffel (penalty scored); Kebano (penalty scored); Bailey (penalty scored); Schrijvers (penalty scored); Walsh (penalty scored)		Marcq (penalty missed); Stevance (penalty scored); Ferber (penalty scored); Penneteau (penalty scored); Perbet (penalty scored)

2 December 2015	Mouscron-Péruwelz	1–0	OH Leuven	Mouscron
20:00	Marquet 16'	Report		Stadium: Stade Le Canonnier

2 December 2015	KV Mechelen	2–1	Waasland-Beveren	Mechelen
20:00	Verdier 8', 54'	Report	M'Sila 21'	Stadium: Argosstadion Achter de Kazerne

2 December 2015	Westerlo	1–1 (a.e.t.) (5–4 p)	Antwerp (II)	Westerlo
20:30	Schuermans 79'	Report	Dequevy 60' (pen.)	Stadium: Het Kuipje
	Penalties
	Daems (penalty scored); Gounongbe (penalty missed); Hyland (penalty scored); Višņakovs (penalty missed); Mustoe (penalty scored); Apau (penalty scored); Koffi (penalty scored)		Dequevy (penalty missed); Dufer (penalty scored); Hairemans (penalty scored); Dom (penalty scored); Colpaert (penalty missed); Biset (penalty scored); Binst (penalty missed)

2 December 2015	Standard Liège	2–0	Sint-Truiden	Liège
20:30	Yatabaré 19'; Arslanagic 44'	Report		Stadium: Stade Maurice Dufrasne

2 December 2015	Kortrijk	4–2	Anderlecht	Kortrijk
20:45	Poulain 10'; Chanot 26'; Van Eenoo 31'; Marušić 48'		Ezekiel 36'; Defour 64'	Stadium: Guldensporen Stadion

3 December 2015	Club Brugge	1–0	Lokeren	Bruges
20:45	Denswil 90+3'	Report		Stadium: Jan Breydel Stadium

== Quarter-finals ==
In contrary to previous years, the quarter-finals will be single leg ties. The draw was made on 3 December 2015 and the matches will be played on 16 and 17 December 2015.

16 December 2015	Genk	2–1	Mouscron-Péruwelz	Genk
20:30	Kebano 36', 44'	Report	Hubert 90' (pen.)	Stadium: Cristal Arena

16 December 2015	Gent	1–0	Mechelen	Ghent
20:45	Dejaegere 11'	Report		Stadium: Ghelamco Arena

16 December 2015	Westerlo	0–2	Club Brugge	Westerlo
20:45		Report	Diaby 18', 73' (pen.)	Stadium: Het Kuipje

17 December 2015	Standard Liège	2–0	Kortrijk	Liège
20:30	Teixeira 9'; Dossevi 36'	Report		Stadium: Stade Maurice Dufrasne

== Semi-finals ==
The draw for the semi-finals was made on 17 December 2015, immediately after the end of the match between Standard and Kortrijk. The semi-finals will be played over two legs, with the first legs played on 20 and 21 January 2016 and the second legs on 2 and 3 February 2016.

=== First legs ===
20 January 2016	Standard Liège	2–0	Genk	Liège
20:45	Edmilson 6'; Trebel 36'	Report		Stadium: Stade Maurice Dufrasne; Attendance: 16,982; Referee: Johan Verbist

21 January 2016	Gent	2–1	Club Brugge	Ghent
20:45	Dejaegere 60'; Kums 90+2'	Report	Diaby 39'	Stadium: Ghelamco Arena; Attendance: 19,999; Referee: Luc Wouters

=== Second legs ===
2 February 2016	Genk	1–1 (1–3 agg.)	Standard Liège	Genk
20:45	Karelis 20'	Report	Trebel 28'	Stadium: Cristal Arena; Attendance: 8,652; Referee: Sebastien Delferiere

3 February 2016	Club Brugge	1–0 (2–2 agg.)	Gent	Bruges
20:45	Diaby 22'	Report		Stadium: Jan Breydel Stadium; Referee: Johan Verbist

== Final ==
The final took place on 20 March 2016 at the King Baudouin Stadium in Brussels.

20 March 2016
16:00

Club Brugge	1–2	Standard Liège
Refaelov 27'	Report	Dompé 17'; Santini 88'

King Baudouin Stadium, Brussels
Attendance: 50,093
Referee: Johan Verbist
