= Moussa Diallo =

Moussa Diallo is a name. People with that name include:

- Moussa Diallo (footballer, born 1990), Senegalese footballer
- Moussa Diallo (footballer, born 1997), French footballer
