= Samuel Asamoah =

Ghanaian footballer

Personal information
- Date of birth: 23 March 1994 (age 32)
- Place of birth: Accra, Ghana
- Height: 1.66 m (5 ft 5 in)
- Position: Midfielder

Team information
- Current team: Chindia Târgoviște
- Number: 90

Youth career
- 2007–2012: Aspire Academy

Senior career*
Years	Team	Apps	(Gls)
2012–2017	Eupen	102	(12)
2015–2016	→ OH Leuven (loan)	17	(1)
2017–2021	Sint-Truiden	110	(6)
2021–2024	FC U Craiova	74	(1)
2024	Qingdao Red Lions	24	(3)
2025	Guangxi Pingguo	23	(1)
2026–	Chindia Târgoviște	2	(0)

International career^{‡}
2022–2024	Togo	7	(0)
- * Club domestic league appearances and goals as of 31 October 2026 ‡ National team caps and goals as of 14 June 2023

Samuel Asamoah (born 23 March 1994) is a professional footballer who plays as a midfielder for Liga II club Chindia Târgoviște. Born in Ghana, he plays for the Togo national team.

== Club career ==
During the 2015–16 season, Asamoah was loaned to OH Leuven from Eupen. After the loan he returned to Eupen but was deemed surplus, leaving the team after the 2016–17 season for Sint-Truiden where he stayed for four seasons.

While playing for Guangxi Pingguo, Asamoah was seriously injured during a Chinese League One match against Chongqing Tonglianglong. He suffered a broken neck after colliding with an LED advertising board while jostling for the ball, with the opposition player Zhang Zhixiong being handed a yellow card for the challenge.

== International career ==
Asamoah was eligible for both Togo and Ghana national sides at international level. He made his debut for Togo on 3 June 2022 in a match against Eswatini.

== Career statistics ==
=== Club ===
As of match played 31 October 2026

Appearances and goals by club, season and competition
Club	Season	League			National Cup (Note: Includes Belgian Cup, Cupa României, Chinese FA Cup)		Continental		Other		Total	
Club	Season	Division	Apps	Goals	Apps	Goals	Apps	Goals	Apps	Goals	Apps	Goals
Eupen	2012–13	Belgian Second Division	32	2	1	0	—		—		33	2
Eupen	2013–14	Belgian Second Division	37	5	2	0	—		—		39	5
Eupen	2014–15	Belgian Second Division	33	5	2	0	—		—		35	5
Eupen	Total		102	12	5	0	—		—		107	12
OH Leuven (loan)	2015–16	Belgian Pro League	17	1	1	0	—		—		18	1
Sint-Truiden	2017–18	Belgian First Division A	29	2	1	0	—		—		30	2
Sint-Truiden	2018–19	Belgian First Division A	36	0	2	0	—		—		38	0
Sint-Truiden	2019–20	Belgian First Division A	27	4	1	0	—		—		28	4
Sint-Truiden	2020–21	Belgian First Division A	18	0	1	0	—		—		19	0
Sint-Truiden	Total		110	6	5	0	—		—		115	6
FC U Craiova	2021–22	Liga I	37	1	2	0	—		—		39	1
FC U Craiova	2022–23	Liga I	28	0	4	0	—		1 (Note: Appearance in Liga I European play-offs)	0	33	0
FC U Craiova	2023–24	Liga I	9	0	1	0	—		—		10	0
FC U Craiova	Total		74	1	7	0	—		1	0	82	1
Qingdao Red Lions	2024	China League One	24	3	1	0	—		—		25	3
Guangxi Pingguo	2025	China League One	23	1	1	0	—		—		24	1
Chindia Târgoviște	2026–27	Liga II	2	0	0	0	—		—		2	0
Career total			352	24	20	0	0	0	1	0	373	24

=== International ===
As of match played 14 June 2023

National team	Year	Apps	Goals
Togo
Togo	2022	6	0
Togo	2023	1	0
Total		7	0

== Personal life ==
Asamoah was born in Accra to a Togolese mother and a Ghanaian father.
