= Axel Bossekota =

Belgian footballer

Personal information
- Full name: Axel Bossekota Bofunda
- Date of birth: 9 April 1989 (age 37)
- Place of birth: France
- Positions: Midfielder; winger; forward

Senior career*
Years	Team	Apps	(Gls)
20xx–2008	Amiens SC	0	(0)
2008–2009	Oud-Heverlee Leuven	8	(0)
2009–2010	R.A.E.C. Mons	5	(0)
2010	S.V. Zulte Waregem	0	(0)
2010–20xx	Pafos FC		
2011	AS Marck	14	(2)
2011–2012	KSC Grimbergen		
2012	K.V.K. Tienen-Hageland	11	(1)
2013	Limerick F.C.	22	(6)
2014–2015	AS Verbroedering Geel	27	(11)
2015–2016	Cercle Brugge K.S.V.	3	(0)
2016	Royal Football Club Seraing	10	(2)
2016–2017	RWS Bruxelles	11	(2)
2017–2018	FC Lebbeke		
2018–2019	K.V. Woluwe-Zaventem		
2019–2021	Léopold FC		
2021–2023	IC Croix		
2023–	Tourqoing		
- * Club domestic league appearances and goals

Axel Bossekota (born 9 April 1989 in France) is a Belgian footballer who is currently playing for Tourqoing in the Régional 1.

== Career ==
Bossekota started his senior career with French club Amiens SC. In 2015, he signed for Cercle Brugge K.S.V. in the Belgian First Division B, where he made three appearances and scored zero goals. After that, he played for Belgian clubs Royal Football Club Seraing, RWS Bruxelles, Lebbeke, K.V. Woluwe-Zaventem and Léopold.
