= Kenneth Houdret =

Belgian footballer

Personal information
- Date of birth: 9 August 1993 (age 33)
- Place of birth: Charleroi, Belgium
- Height: 1.91 m (6 ft 3 in)
- Positions: Defensive midfielder; centre-back

Team information
- Current team: Rochefort
- Number: 25

Youth career
- –2011: Charleroi

Senior career*
Years	Team	Apps	(Gls)
2011–2016	Charleroi	48	(3)
2015–2016	→ OH Leuven (loan)	20	(1)
2016–2017	OH Leuven	26	(1)
2017–2018	Union SG	24	(2)
2018	Avellino	0	(0)
2018–2025	Dender EH	97	(7)
2024–2025	→ Mons (loan)	20	(0)
2025–	Rochefort	17	(0)
- * Club domestic league appearances and goals as of 28 June 2026

Kenneth Houdret (born 9 August 1993) is a Belgian professional footballer who plays as a midfielder for Rochefort.

== Club career ==
Houdret is a left-footed midfielder who made his debut during the 2011/12 season in the Belgian Second Division for Charleroi.

Houdret will move to Rochefort from the summer of 2025.
