= Alessio Allegria =

Belgian footballer

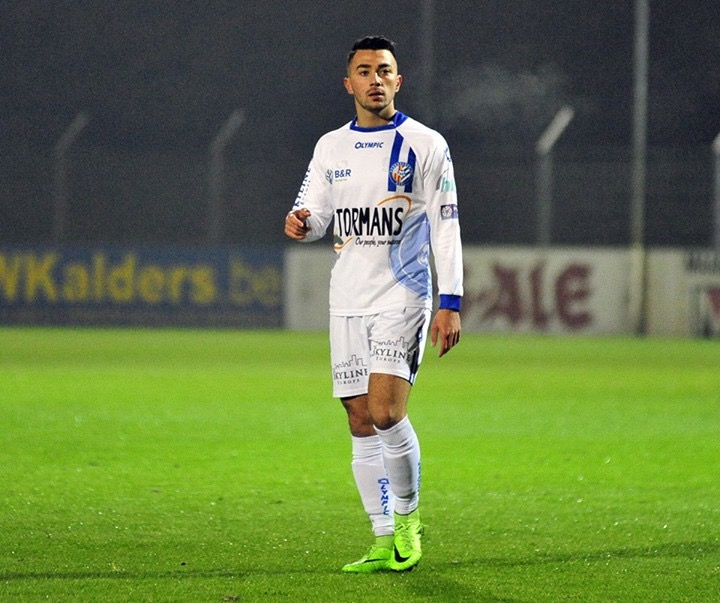

Personal information
- Date of birth: 28 July 1995 (age 31)
- Place of birth: Genk, Belgium
- Height: 1.75 m (5 ft 9 in)
- Positions: Attacking midfielder; striker

Team information
- Current team: Turkse Rangers
- Number: 35

Senior career*
Years	Team	Apps	(Gls)
2013–2014	Zulte Waregem	0	(0)
2014–2015	Patro Eisden	27	(5)
2015–2016	Geel	31	(9)
2016–2017	Seraing	10	(1)
2017	Shakhter Karagandy	12	(1)
2017–2019	Patro Eisden	30	(6)
2019–2020	Thes Sport	14	(3)
2020	→ Lierse (loan)	6	(0)
2020–2021	Marina di Ragusa	7	(0)
2021–2022	Bocholt VV	30	(5)
2022–2023	Belisia Bilzen	28	(12)
2023–2024	Houtvenne	25	(10)
2024–2025	KVK Wellen	30	(9)
2025–	Turkse Rangers	0	(0)

International career
2012–2013	Belgium U18	3	(0)
- * Club domestic league appearances and goals as of 15 January 2026

Alessio Allegria (born 28 July 1995) is a Belgian footballer who plays as a striker for Turkse Rangers.

== Career ==
Allegra started his senior career with S.V. Zulte Waregem in 2013. In 2017, he signed for Shakhter Karagandy in the Kazakhstan Premier League where he made thirteen appearances and scored one goal. After that, he played for Belgian clubs K. Patro Eisden Maasmechelen and K.V.V. Thes Sport Tessenderlo, where he plays now.
