= Kenny Van Hoevelen =

Belgian footballer

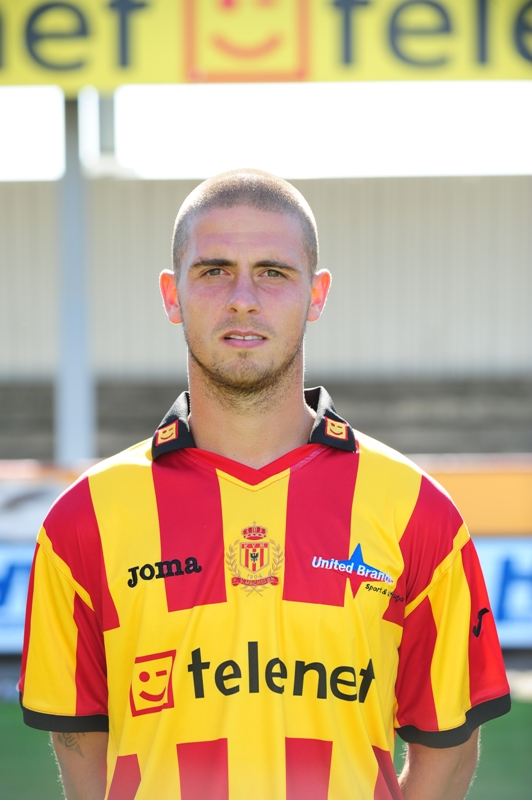

Personal information
- Date of birth: 24 June 1983 (age 43)
- Place of birth: Mechelen, Belgium
- Height: 1.84 m (6 ft 1/2 in)
- Position: Centre-back

Team information
- Current team: Sint-Amands

Youth career
- VC Langdorp
- Westerlo

Senior career*
| Years | Team | Apps | (Gls) |
| 2001–2003 | Westerlo | 6 | (0) |
| 2003–2005 | Patro Eisden | | |
| 2005–2014 | KV Mechelen | 185 | (2) |
| 2013–2014 | → RKC Waalwijk (loan) | 26 | (1) |
| 2014–2016 | OH Leuven | 22 | (1) |
| 2016–2017 | Eendracht Aalst | | |
| 2017–2018 | Temse | | |
| 2018–2019 | Eendracht Aalst | | |
| 2019–2020 | Dikkelvenne | | |
| 2020–2024 | Mariekerke-Branst | | |
| 2025– | Sint-Amands | | |
- * Club domestic league appearances and goals as of 20:40, 31 October 2023 (UTC)

Kenny Van Hoevelen (born 24 June 1983 in Mechelen, is a Belgian football (soccer) centre-back who currently plays for Sint-Amands in the Belgian Provincial Leagues. His previous clubs include Westerlo, KV Mechelen, RKC Waalwijk, Oud-Heverlee Leuven and Eendracht Aalst.
