= Raoul Ngadrira =

Zaire-born Belgian footballer

Personal information
- Full name: Raoul Ngadrira Avansey
- Date of birth: 30 June 1989 (age 37)
- Place of birth: Kinshasa, Zaire
- Height: 1.81 m (5 ft 11 1/2 in)
- Position: Forward

Team information
- Current team: SK Pepingen-Halle
- Number: 24

Senior career*
Years	Team	Apps	(Gls)
2008–2010	KV Mechelen	3	(0)
2010–2011	Rupel Boom	22	(1)
2012–2013	FCV Dender EH	33	(15)
2013–2014	La Louvière Centre	14	(2)
2014	Lokomotiv Sofia	9	(0)
2014–2017	R.E. Virton	69	(20)
2017–	SK Pepingen-Halle	?	(?)
- * Club domestic league appearances and goals as of 27 January 2017

Raoul Ngadrira (born 30 June 1989 in Kinshasa) is a Zaire-born Belgian footballer who plays as a forward for SK Pepingen-Halle.
