= David Vandenbroeck =

Belgian footballer

Personal information
- Date of birth: 12 July 1985 (age 41)
- Place of birth: Braine-l'Alleud, Belgium
- Height: 1.85 m (6 ft 1 in)
- Position: Centre-back

Team information
- Current team: Union Namur (Manager)

Youth career
- 1999–2001: RCS Braine
- 2001–2003: Nancy

Senior career*
Years	Team	Apps	(Gls)
2003–2008	Tubize	107	(10)
2008–2010	Charleroi	22	(0)
2009–2010	→ Kortrijk (loan)	36	(3)
2010–2013	Zulte Waregem	32	(3)
2011–2012	→ Kortrijk (loan)	9	(1)
2013	→ Royal Antwerp (loan)	13	(1)
2013–2014	Tubize	30	(3)
2014–2015	Oud-Heverlee Leuven	31	(6)
2016–2020	Differdange	91	(14)
2020–2021	FC Wiltz 71	35	(4)

Managerial career
- 2021–2024: FC Wiltz 71
- 2024-: Union Namur
- * Club domestic league appearances and goals

David Vandenbroeck (born 12 July 1985 in Braine-l'Alleud) is a retired Belgian football centre-back and current manager of Union Namur.

== Career ==
=== Managerial career ===
On 20 October 2021 Vandenbroeck decided to hang up his boots in favor of accepting a job offer as coach of FC Wiltz 71, the club he played for.
