= David Wijns =

Belgian footballer

Personal information
- Date of birth: 9 January 1987 (age 39)
- Place of birth: Leuven, Belgium
- Height: 1.82 m (6 ft 0 in)
- Position: Right back

Team information
- Current team: ASV Geel

Senior career*
Years	Team	Apps	(Gls)
2005–2011	Heist	163	(22)
2011–2013	Kortrijk	29	(0)
2013–2015	OH Leuven	18	(0)
2014–2015	→ Heist (loan)	29	(4)
2015–2023	Heist	149	(1)
2023–	ASV Geel	0	(0)
- * Club domestic league appearances and goals as of 16 August 2023

David Wijns (born 9 January 1987) is a Belgian footballer who currently plays for ASV Geel in the Belgian Division 3.

== Career ==
Wijns started his professional football career with Heist in the Belgian Promotion, helping the team promote twice to end up in the Belgian Second Division before being transferred to Belgian Pro League team Kortrijk in 2011. For Kortrijk, he played 29 league games in two seasons, before moving back to his birth town to join OH Leuven in 2013. In August 2014, Wijns was loaned back to Heist for one season, with the loan eventually being made permanent following the 2014–15 season.
