= Alessandro Cerigioni =

Belgian footballer

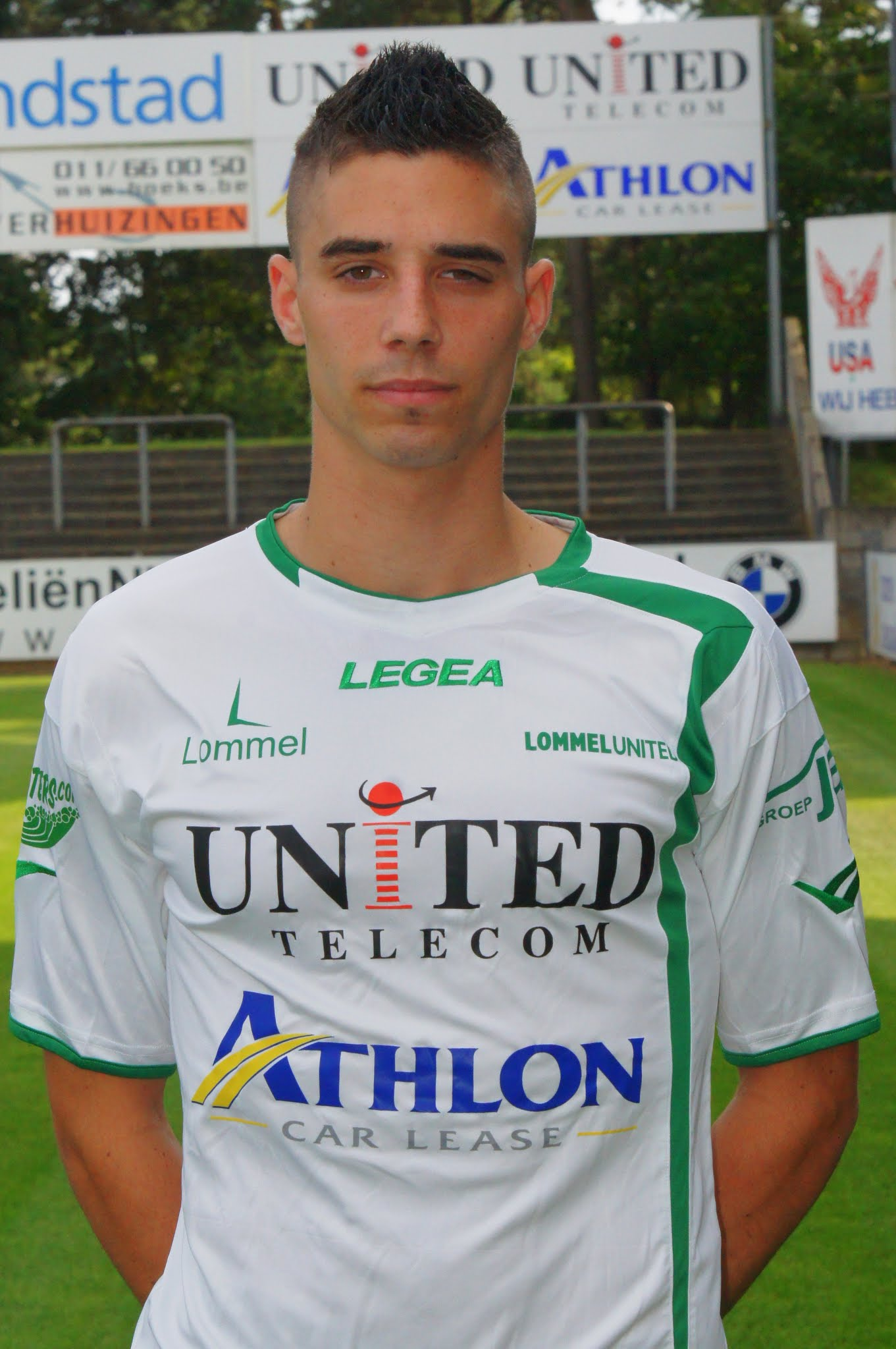

Personal information
- Date of birth: 30 September 1992 (age 34)
- Place of birth: Belgium
- Height: 1.78 m (5 ft 10 in)
- Position: Forward

Team information
- Current team: Weerstand Koersel

Youth career
- 1998-2008: Berkenbos VV
- 2008-2009: Lommel United

Senior career*
Years	Team	Apps	(Gls)
2010-2012	Lommel United	103	(28)
2013-2016	OH Leuven	88	(15)
2016-2018	Waasland-Beveren	30	(3)
2017-2018	→ Roeselare (loan)	23	(2)
2018-2020	Lommel	30	(1)
2020	→ Dessel Sport (loan)	6	(3)
2020-2023	Dessel Sport		
2023-	Weerstand Koersel		

International career
2010-2011	Belgium U-19	13	(3)
2012	Belgium U-20	2	(0)
- * Club domestic league appearances and goals as of 26 June 2020

Alessandro Cerigioni (born 30 September 1992) is a Belgian footballer who currently plays for Weerstand Koersel in the Belgian Provincial Leagues. He is of Italian descent.

== Career ==
Cerigioni played several seasons for Lommel United in the Belgian Second Division from 2010 until 2012, scoring no less than 23 league goals. Still only 20 years, Cerigioni was signed by Oud-Heverlee Leuven in January 2013 and given his first few minutes away to Waasland-Beveren later that same month.
