= Yohan Brouckaert =

Belgian footballer

Personal information
- Full name: Yohan Brouckaert
- Date of birth: 30 October 1987 (age 39)
- Place of birth: Mouscron, Belgium
- Position: Midfielder

Team information
- Current team: Tournai

Youth career
- 1992–2006: Mouscron

Senior career*
Years	Team	Apps	(Gls)
2006–2007	Mouscron	0	(0)
2007–2010	AFC Tubize	110	(11)
2011–2014	KV Oostende	92	(23)
2014	Royal Mouscron-Péruwelz	4	(0)
2014–2016	OH Leuven	27	(5)
2015–2016	→ Roeselare (loan)	0	(0)
2016–2020	RWDM47	0	(0)
2020–2021	Mandel United	0	(0)
2022–	Tournai	0	(0)
- * Club domestic league appearances and goals as of 15 October 2015 (UTC)

Yohan Brouckaert (born 30 October 1987) is a Belgian footballer who plays for Tournai.
