= Christophe Bertjens =

Belgian footballer

Personal information
- Date of birth: 5 January 1993 (age 33)
- Place of birth: Tongeren, Belgium
- Height: 1.82 m (6 ft 0 in)
- Position: Forward

Team information
- Current team: RC Hades
- Number: 7

Youth career
- –2010: Sint-Truiden

Senior career*
Years	Team	Apps	(Gls)
2010–2015	Sint-Truiden	22	(0)
2013–2014	→ Geel (loan)	10	(1)
2014–2015	→ Bocholt VV (loan)		
2015–2017	Lommel	52	(20)
2017	Westerlo	2	(0)
2017–2018	Union SG	12	(2)
2018–2022	Bocholt VV	83	(39)
2022–2023	Houtvenne	30	(15)
2023–	RC Hades	62	(25)

International career
2010	Belgium U18	2	(1)
2010–2011	Belgium U19	7	(0)
- * Club domestic league appearances and goals as of 26 January 2026

Christophe Bertjens (born 5 January 1993) is a Belgian professional footballer who plays as a forward for RC Hades.
