= Romain Reynaud =

French footballer and manager (born 1983)

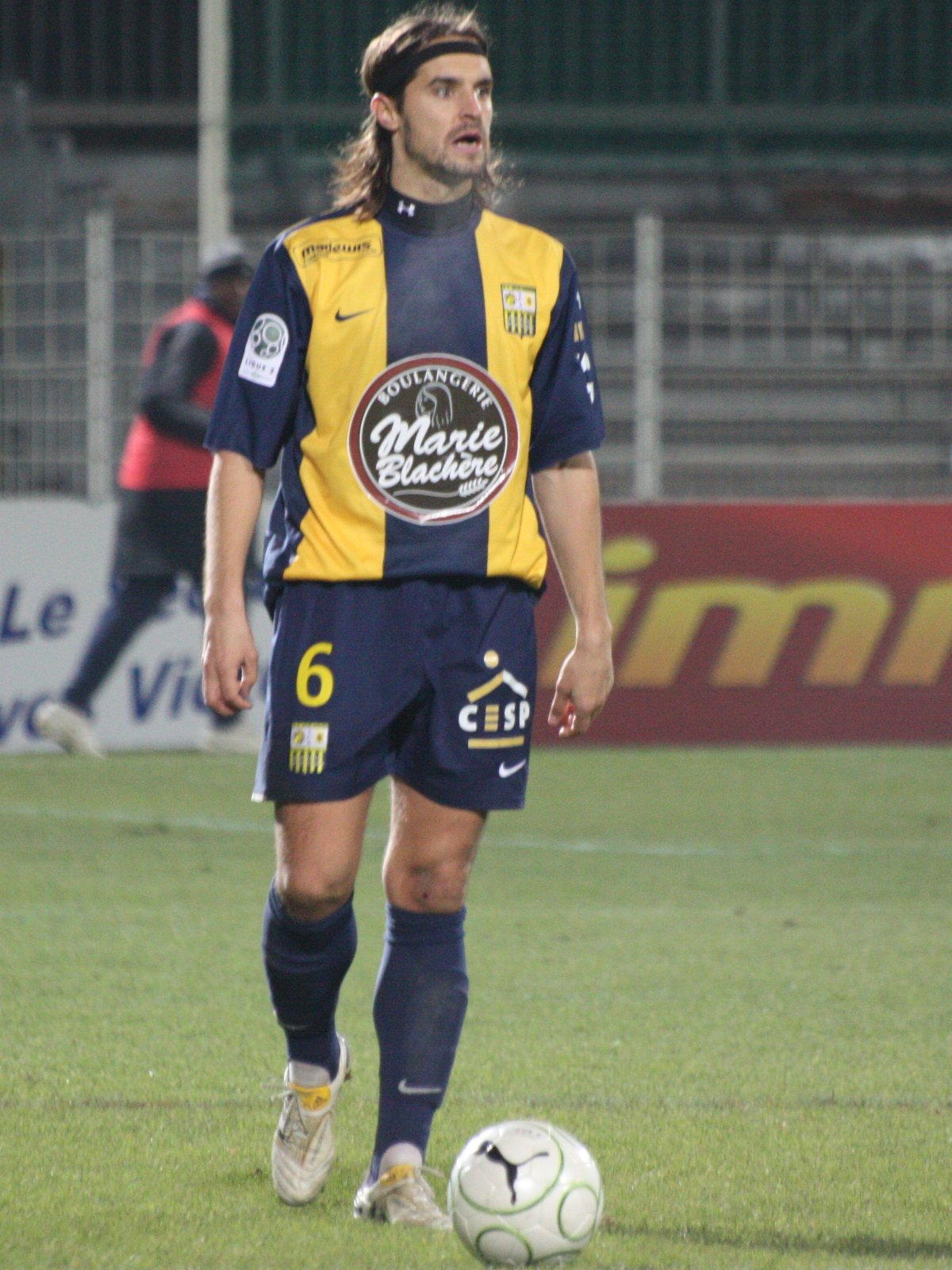

Personal information
- Date of birth: 2 March 1983 (age 43)
- Place of birth: Saint-Étienne, France-
- Height: 1.80 m (5 ft 11 in)
- Position: Defender

Team information
- Current team: Hauts Lyonnais (manager)

Senior career*
Years	Team	Apps	(Gls)
2000–2003	Saint-Étienne B		
2003–2005	SC Schiltigheim		
2005–2007	Yzeure	32	(2)
2007–2008	Vannes	36	(4)
2008–2009	Libourne	35	(2)
2009–2010	Arles-Avignon	37	(2)
2010–2012	Châteauroux	66	(0)
2012–2014	Kortrijk	37	(0)
2014	→ OH Leuven (loan)	6	(1)
2014–2017	OH Leuven	55	(1)
2017–2018	Andrézieux	22	(0)

Managerial career
- 2018–: Hauts Lyonnais
- * Club domestic league appearances and goals as of 22:07, 27 January 2019 (UTC)

Romain Reynaud (born 2 March 1983) is a French former professional footballer who played as a defender. He is the head coach of Championnat National 3 club Hauts Lyonnais.

During the 2009–10 season, Reynaud played in Ligue 2 for AC Arles-Avignon. He joined Châteauroux the following season, remaining with the club until 2012.
