= Moussa Diallo (footballer, born 1990) =

Senegalese footballer (born 1990)

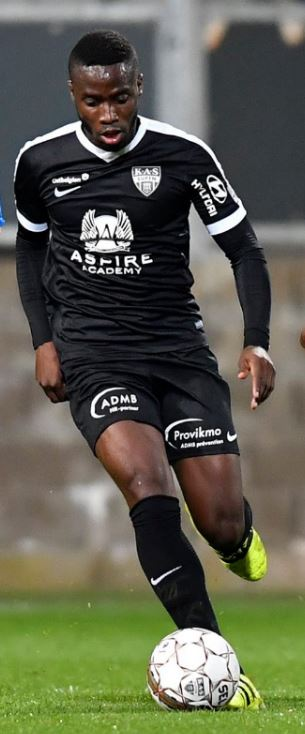

Personal information
- Date of birth: 20 November 1990 (age 35)
- Place of birth: Pikine, Senegal
- Height: 1.83 m (6 ft 0 in)
- Position: Forward

Team information
- Current team: Rodange 91

Senior career*
Years	Team	Apps	(Gls)
2007–2008	RFC Andrimont		
2008–2009	RFC St. Vith		
2009–2010	RFC Andrimont		
2010–2011	Verviers	25	(7)
2011–2012	RFC Malmundaria 1904		
2012–2014	Royal Aywaille FC		
2014–2015	Liège		
2015–2016	Spouwen-Mopertingen	21	(9)
2016–2017	RFCU Kelmis	30	(33)
2017–2019	Eupen	12	(0)
2019	RWDM47	0	(0)
2019–2020	Spouwen-Mopertingen		
2021–	Rodange 91	0	(0)
- * Club domestic league appearances and goals as of 20:36, 4 February 2021 (UTC)

Moussa Diallo (born 20 November 1990) is a Senegalese footballer who plays in Luxembourg for FC Rodange 91.
