= Nicolas Delporte =

Belgian footballer

Personal information
- Date of birth: 1 January 1993 (age 33)
- Place of birth: Theux, Belgium
- Height: 1.78 m (5 ft 10 in)
- Position: Left back

Youth career
- 2000–2001: Battice
- 2001–2013: Standard Liège

Senior career*
Years	Team	Apps	(Gls)
2012–2013	Standard Liège B	?	(?)
2013–2014	KAA Gent B	?	(?)
2014–2017	OH Leuven	25	(1)
- * Club domestic league appearances and goals as of 10 November 2015

Nicolas Delporte (born 1 January 1993) is a retired Belgian professional footballer, who last played as a wing-back for Oud-Heverlee Leuven in the Belgian First Division B.
