= Ivan Yagan =

Belgian footballer

Personal information
- Date of birth: 11 October 1989 (age 37)
- Place of birth: Brussels, Belgium
- Height: 1.75 m (5 ft 9 in)
- Position: Forward

Team information
- Current team: Tienen
- Number: 10

Senior career*
Years	Team	Apps	(Gls)
2008–2010	WS Woluwe	48	(6)
2010–2012	Lokeren	1	(0)
2011–2012	→ Charleroi (loan)	18	(2)
2012–2014	WS Woluwe	30	(3)
2014	Heist	8	(1)
2014–2015	Racing Mechelen	21	(11)
2015	Sint-Truiden	4	(0)
2015–2017	Cercle Brugge	65	(23)
2017–2018	Lierse	32	(12)
2018–2019	Eupen	4	(0)
2020	IFK Mariehamn	4	(0)
2020-2021	RWDM47	17	(4)
2021-2022	Lierse	19	(6)
2022-	Tienen	89	(34)

International career
2018–	Armenia	3	(1)
- * Club domestic league appearances and goals as of 6 May 2025

Ivan Yagan (born 11 October 1989) is an Armenian football player who plays as a forward and is currently playing for Tienen.

Yagan's younger brother Ben Yagan also plays professional football.

== International career ==
=== International goals ===
Scores and results list Armenia's goal tally first.

No	Date	Venue	Opponent	Score	Result	Competition
1.	29 May 2018	Gernot Langes Stadion, Wattens, Austria	Malta	1–0	1–1	Friendly
