= Romero Regales =

Curaçao footballer (born 1986)

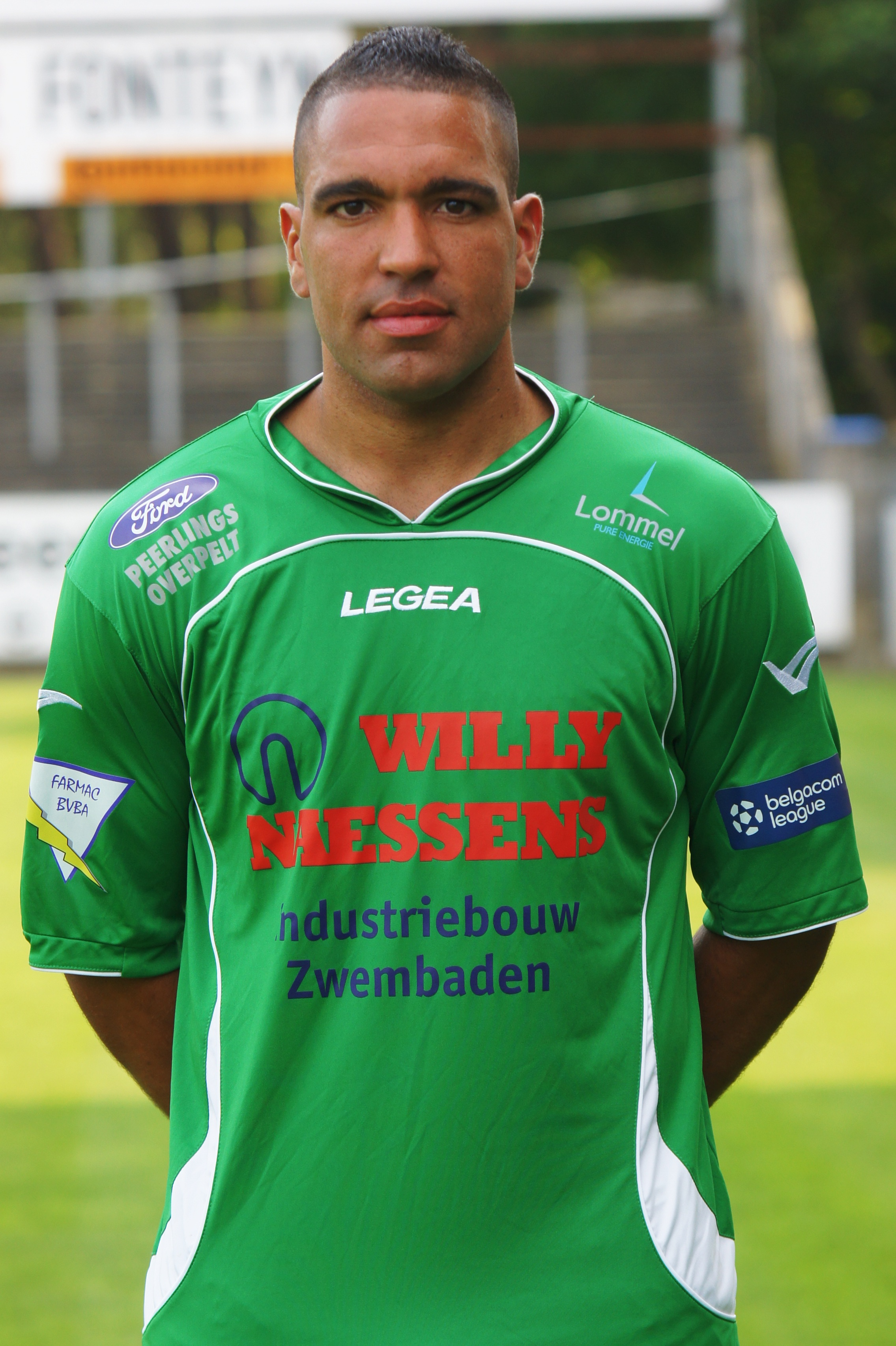

Personal information
- Date of birth: 7 November 1986 (age 39)
- Place of birth: Sittard, Netherlands
- Height: 1.88 m (6 ft 2 in)
- Position: Forward

Team information
- Current team: Beringen

Youth career
- –2007: RKVV Almania
- 2007–2008: Fortuna Sittard

Senior career*
Years	Team	Apps	(Gls)
2008–2009	Fortuna Sittard	5	(0)
2009–2011	FC Vinkenslag		(0)
2011–2012	Excelsior Veldwezelt		(0)
2012–2013	Patro Eisden	29	(24)
2013–2015	Lommel United	63	(33)
2015–2016	OH Leuven	12	(0)
2016–2017	FC Den Bosch	18	(8)
2018–2019	Lommel	7	(0)
2020	Patro Eisden	5	(1)
2020–2022	Bocholt	0	(0)
2023	Echt	0	(0)
2023–	Beringen	0	(0)

International career
2015–	Curaçao	1	(0)
- * Club domestic league appearances and goals as of 19:28, 29 April 2020 (UTC)

Romero Regales (born 7 November 1986) is a Curaçaoan professional footballer who plays as a forward for Beringen in the Belgian Provincial Leagues.

== International career ==
Regales made his debut for the Curaçao national team in a qualification match for the 2018 World Cup against Montserrat on 27 March 2015.
