= Ibrahim Somé Salombo =

Congolese football striker (born 1988)

Ibrahim Somé
Personal information
- Full name: Ibrahim Somé Salombo
- Date of birth: 24 May 1988 (age 38)
- Place of birth: Kinshasa, Zaire
- Height: 1.82 m (6 ft 0 in)
- Position: Striker

Team information
- Current team: Léopold

Senior career*
Years	Team	Apps	(Gls)
2004	Inter Kinshasa		
2005	SC Cilu		
2005–2006	Ajax Cape Town	8	(0)
2007	Brussels	0	(0)
2007–2008	Lokeren	3	(0)
2008	→ Bežanija (loan)	11	(4)
2008–2009	Red Star Belgrade	16	(3)
2009–2010	Dender	23	(7)
2010–2011	F91 Dudelange	13	(7)
2011–2013	La Louvière Centre	42	(19)
2013–2014	RWDM Brussels	15	(8)
2014	→ Sint-Truiden (loan)	7	(2)
2014–2015	OH Leuven	27	(5)
2015–2016	White Star Bruxelles	16	(4)
2016–2017	RWDM47	13	(5)
2018–2020	Olympic Charleroi		
2021–2023	Jette	34	(12)
2023–2024	Stade Everois	24	(9)
2024–2025	Léopold		

International career
2006–2010	DR Congo	4	(0)
- * Club domestic league appearances and goals as of 3 March 2026

Ibrahim Somé Salombo (born 24 May 1988) is a Congolese footballer who plays as a striker.

== Club career ==
He started playing in his home country first with SC Inter de Kinshasa and then with SC Cilu in Linafoot, the top-league of the country. During the 2005–06 season he moved abroad to South Africa and joined Ajax Cape Town playing with them until the end of the 2005–06 Premier Soccer League.

In summer 2006 he moved to Europe. He signed with Belgian side FC Brussels but failed to make any appearance in the league. Following summer he moved to Lokeren and debuted in the 2007–08 Belgian First Division. At the winter-break he agreed to a loan to Serbian side FK Bežanija where he played the second half of the season.

Somé Salombo scored four goals in eleven appearances with Bežanija in the 2007–08 Serbian SuperLiga and his performance attracted attention from Serbian giants Red Star Belgrade who signed him in summer 2008. However, 2008–09 was a turbulent season for Red Star and Somé left having made three goals in sixteen appearances in the SuperLiga. He returned to Belgium and made a solid season with Dender in 2009–10 Belgian Second Division.

In summer 2011 he moved to Luxembourg and joined F91 Dudelange in Luxembourg. He contributed with seven goals in thirteen appearances for Dudelange to become champion. After that productive season in Luxembourg National Division, he returned to Belgium and played the following two seasons in third-level side UR La Louvière Centre. While playing with La Louvière he was elected the player of the season in June 2012 by the fans.

In 2013, he signed RWDM Brussels in what was the return of Somé to the second level. He spent the second half of the 2013–14 Belgian Second Division season playing on loan at Sint-Truiden. Following season he stayed in same league but playing with OH Leuven. In 2015, he signed with White Star Bruxelles and became champion of Belgian Second Division. White Star should have been promoted to the Belgian Pro League however, the Belgian professional football license was refused to them by the Belgian FA, thus the club ended up relegated to the Belgian First Amateur Division instead, and Somé left White Star and signed with RWDM47.

In August 2021, Somé joined Belgian Division 2 amateur club RSD Jette.

== International career ==
Somé played four official appearances for the DR Congo national team between 2006 and 2010, as well as one FIFA unofficial match in 2010.

== Honours ==
F91 Dudelange

- Luxembourg National Division: 2010–11

White Star Bruxelles

- Belgian Second Division: 2015–16
