= KFC Dessel Sport =

Belgian football club

Dessel
- Founded: 1926; 100 years ago
- Ground: Armand Melisstadion, Dessel
- Capacity: 4,284
- Chairman: Willy Mermans
- Manager: Benny Lunenburg
- League: Belgian Division 1
- 2024–25: Belgian Division 1, 5th of 16
Home colours	Away colours

Koninklijke Football Club Dessel Sport, or KFC Dessel Sport, is a Belgian association football club based in Dessel in the province of Antwerp. The club currently play in the Belgian Division 1, the third tier of Belgian football.

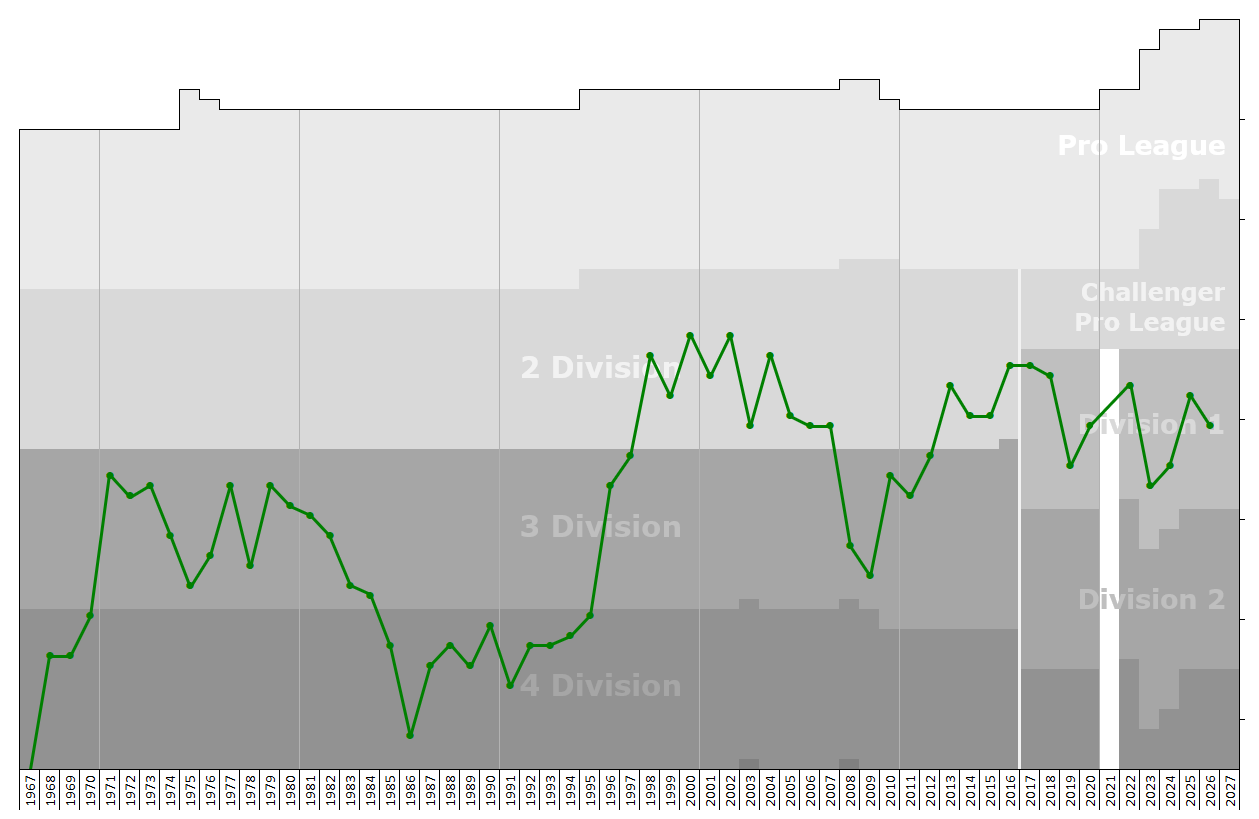
Historical chart of Dessel league performance

== Current squad ==
As of 3 March 2026

Note: Flags indicate national team as defined under FIFA eligibility rules; some limited exceptions apply. Players may hold more than one non-FIFA nationality.

No.	Pos.	Nation	Player
1	GK	BEL	Keo Boets
4	DF	BEL	Vangelis Costoulas
5	DF	BEL	Tristan Teuchy
8	DF	BEL	Yannick Vandersmissen
10	FW	BEL	Jorn Vancamp
11	FW	BEL	Mauro Trari
16	FW	BEL	Arno Van Keilegom
17	FW	BEL	Mathieu Troonbeeckx
18	MF	BEL	Seppe Geukens
20	MF	NED	Sander Rau
21	MF	BEL	Kenley Baelus
22	MF	BEL	Fabio Sposito

No.	Pos.	Nation	Player
24	DF	BEL	Hannes Smolders
25	DF	BEL	Brent Peers
27	DF	BEL	Stan Kolen
31	FW	BEL	Jordy Mathei
34	DF	BEL	Jamal Ali Colo
41	DF	BEL	Mats Van Ballaer
47	MF	BEL	Sverre Piedfort
48	MF	BEL	Robbe Claes
65	DF	BEL	Tijs Vandendungen
80	FW	BEL	Javan Ngoyi
88	GK	BEL	Door Lievens
99	GK	BEL	Xander Linders

== Coaches ==
- André Rooymans (1964–1965)
- Alfons Leysen (1965–1967)
- Charlie Feyen (1967–1971)
- Robert Willems (1971–1973)
- Staf Kauwenberghs (1973–1975)
- Robert Willems (1975–1977)
- Willy Van Cleemput (1977–1978)
- Kamiel Van Damme (1978–1981)
- Jos Weyts (1981)
- Pierre Berx (1981–1982)
- Julien Cools (1982–1983)
- Swat Van Casteren (1983–1984)
- René Desaeyere (1984–1985)
- Robert Willems (1985–1986)
- Willy Elsen (1986–1988)
- Herman Franssen (1988–1990)
- Kamiel Van Damme (1990–1990)
- Herman Franssen (1990–1992)
- Marcel Sterckx (1992–1992)
- Luc Maes (1992–1993)
- Dirk Verbraken (1993–1999)
- (Scotland) Colin Andrews (1999–2000)
- Herman Helleputte (2000–2001)
- Dirk Verbraken (2001–2003)
- Gerard Plessers (2003)
- Ives Serneels (2003–2006)
- Ivo Toelen (2006–2007)
- Luc Reumers (2007)
- Dirk Verbraken (2007–2008)
- Valère Billen (2008–2009)
- Dany David (2009)
- Michel Kenis (2009–2010)
- Stijn Vreven (2010–2013)
- Guido Brepoels (2013–2014)
- Bart Wilmssen (2014–...)
