= 2014–15 Cercle Brugge KSV season =

Cercle Brugge
2014–15 season
- Chairman: Paul Vanhaecke
- Manager: Lorenzo Staelens
- Ground: Jan Breydel Stadium
- Belgian Pro League: 1st
- Belgian Cup: Round of 32

The 2014–15 season is a season played by Cercle Brugge, a Belgian football club based in Bruges, West Flanders. The season covers the period from 1 July 2014 to 30 June 2015. Cercle Brugge will be participating in the Belgian Pro League and Belgian Cup.

== Review ==
=== Pre-season ===
It was announced that Cercle Brugge would play ten matches in preparation for the 2014–15 season, with games against Damme, Oudenburg, Deinze, Sterk Door Combinatie Putten, Vitesse Arnhem, Mechelen, Roeselare, Westerlo, Eendracht Aalst and Al Shabab with the pre-season matches starting from 21 June 2014 and ending on 20 July 2014.

Cercle Brugge's pre-season matches got off to a high-scoring start, with the club scoring seventeen goals in two matches. It started on 21 June with a 0–7 win away to Damme, with new signings Richard Sukuta-Pasu and Stipe Bačelić-Grgić grabbing a goal each along with Karel Van Roose, Bart Buysse, Tim Smolders and a brace from Stephen Buyl. They followed that up with a convincing 0–10 win over Oudenburg, Stephen Buyl scored twice for the second match running while Junior Kabananga scored a hat-trick with the other goals coming from Lukas Van Eenoo, Stephen Buyl, Thibaut Van Acker, Ayron Verkindere and Stipe Bačelić-Grgić.

They continued their fine scoring form into their next two pre-season friendlies, firstly playing out a thrilling 3–4 win against Deinze in a match played at Zeveren Sportief's ground. Followed by a 0–6 win against Sterk Door Combinatie Putten. On 4 July, they drew 1–1 with Eredivisie side Vitesse Arnhem, Stef Wils got Cercle Brugge's only goal of the game to earn a draw at the GelreDome. That was followed by a second consecutive draw when the club tied 0–0 with fellow Belgian Pro League side Mechelen. Cercle Brugge returned to winning ways when they earned a 3–0 victory over Roeselare, with the goals coming from Hans Cornelis, Noë Dussenne and Tim Smolders.

Cercle Brugge failed to find a win in their last two pre-season friendlies, on 17 July they suffered a 0–2 loss to Eendracht Aalst followed by a 1–1 draw three days later to Al Shabab on 20 July at Jan Breydel Stadium.

Cercle Brugge confirmed their first signing for the 2014–15 season on 4 March 2014, it was announced that 21-year-old striker Sam Valcke would join the club from Belgian Third Division side Londerzeel for an undisclosed fee. Sixteen days later the club announced their second signing for the summer, 28-year-old goalkeeper Olivier Werner was signed from Mons. Cercle Brugge signed another goalkeeper on 17 April, when the club completed the signing of Thomas De Bie from Mechelen, that was after the 17-year-old rejected a new contract offer from the aforementioned Belgian Pro League side and also rejected an offer from Gent.

In May, Cercle Brugge signed former German youth international Richard Sukuta-Pasu for an undisclosed fee from 2. Bundesliga side Kaiserslautern, the 24-year-old signed a three-year contract. Just under a month later the club signed Croatian midfielder Stipe Bačelić-Grgić from NK Hrvatski Dragovoljac. Within the next three days, Cercle Bruggle completed two signings in two days. Firstly on 13 June the club signed 20-year-old defender Pierre Bourdin from Paris Saint-Germain, with the Frenchman signing a three-year contract. On 14 June they signed Noë Dussenne following the Belgian's contract expiring at Mons, he also signed a three-year contract.

Two players left the squad from April to June, Thomas Goddeeris was the first player to exit. The versatile defender who can also play in midfield joined lower league side Torhout 1992 KM on a permanent contract after a successful loan spell at the club. Bram Verbist joined Dutch Eerste Divisie club Roda JC Kerkrade on a free transfer on 28 June. As Joris Delle left the club after his loan spell from Nice had expired and Joey Godee returned from his loan spell at Go Ahead Eagles, the club loaned out two players to Deinze. First of all Arne Naudts left on 23 May, while Alessio Staelens joined the Belgian Third Division club on 4 July.

== Competitions ==
=== Friendlies ===
21 June 2014	Damme	0–7	Cercle Brugge	Damme, Belgium
19:00 CEST		Report	Sukuta-Pasu 3'; Buyl 15', 36'; Van Roose 43' (pen.); Bačelić-Grgić 60'; Buysse 70'; Smolders 85'	Stadium: Sportpark 't Veld

25 June 2014	Oudenburg	0–10	Cercle Brugge	Oudenburg, Belgium
19:00 CEST		Report	Van Eenoo 8'; Kabananga 17', 30', 37', 52'; Buyl 25', 57'; Van Acker 32'; Verkindere 68'; Bačelić-Grgić 80'	Stadium: Sportterrein Ter Beke

28 June 2014	Deinze	3–4	Cercle Brugge	Deinze, Belgium
19:00 CEST	Mezine 58'; Naudts 73'; Schamp 85'	Report	Kabananga 32'; Smolders 45'; Bačelić-Grgić 51'; Van Eenoo 77'	Stadium: Zeveren Sportief

3 July 2014	Sterk Door Combinatie Putten	0–6	Cercle Brugge	Putten, Netherlands
18:00 CEST		Report	Valcke 8'; Godee 18', 23', 73'; Maertens 20'; Sukuta-Pasu 40'	Stadium: Sportpark Puttereng

4 July 2014	Vitesse Arnhem	1–1	Cercle Brugge	Arnhem, Netherlands
19:00 CEST	Labyad 50' (pen.)	Report	Wils 13'	Stadium: GelreDome; Attendance: 500; Referee: Pol van Boekel

11 July 2014	Cercle Brugge	0–0	Mechelen	Zedelgem, Belgium
19:00 CEST		Report		Stadium: Stadion FC Veldegem

12 July 2014	Cercle Brugge	3–0	Roeselare	Lichtervelde, Belgium
19:00 CEST	Cornelis 15'; Dussenne 44'; Smolders 58' (pen.)	Report		Stadium: KFC Lichtervelde Stadion

16 July 2014	Cercle Brugge	0–1	Westerlo	Eernegem, Belgium
19:00 CEST		Report	Aoulad 10'	Stadium: Gemeentelijke Sportcentrum Eernegem

17 July 2014	Cercle Brugge	0–2	Eendracht Aalst	Jabbeke, Belgium
19:00 CEST		Report	Vansimpsen 46'; Lapage 73'	Stadium: Bogaertstadion

20 July 2014	Cercle Brugge	1–1	Al Shabab	Bruges, Belgium
15:00 CEST	Kabananga 62'	Report	Torres 82'	Stadium: Jan Breydel Stadium

=== Belgian Pro League ===
==== League table ====
Pos	Team	Pld	W	D	L	GF	GA	GD	Pts	Qualification or relegation
12	Zulte Waregem	30	8	7	15	41	54	−13	31	Qualification for the Europa League play-offs
13	Mouscron-Péruwelz	30	7	5	18	32	51	−19	26	Qualification for the Europa League play-offs
14	Waasland-Beveren	30	7	5	18	30	49	−19	26	Qualification for the Europa League play-offs
15	Cercle Brugge	30	6	6	18	21	45	−24	24	Qualification for the Relegation play-offs
16	Lierse	30	5	7	18	30	63	−33	22	Qualification for the Relegation play-offs

Source: Belgian Pro League
Rules for classification: 1) points; 2) number of matches won; if teams are still tied a play-off is organised.

==== Matches ====
26 July 2014	Cercle Brugge	0–0	Gent	Bruges, Belgium
20:00 CEST	Kabananga (yellow card) 64'; Dussenne (yellow card) 90'	Summary	Zolotić (yellow card) 45'	Stadium: Jan Breydel Stadium; Attendance: 7,465; Referee: Wim Smet

2 August 2014	Racing Genk	1–1	Cercle Brugge	Genk, Belgium
20:00 CEST	Buffel 42'	Summary	Bačelić-Grgić 37'; Godee (yellow card) 50' (yellow-red card); Cornelis (yellow card) 87'	Stadium: Cristal Arena; Attendance: 16,480; Referee: Erik Lambrechts

9 August 2014	Cercle Brugge	0–1	Oostende	Bruges, Belgium
20:00 CEST	Buysse (yellow card) 90+4'	Summary	Berrier 43'; Ruiz (yellow card) 79'	Stadium: Jan Breydel Stadium; Attendance: 6,760; Referee: Alexandre Boucaut

15 August 2014	Club Brugge	1–1	Cercle Brugge	Bruges, Belgium
20:30 CEST	Castillo 29' (yellow card) 71'; Fernando Menegazzo (yellow card) 36'; Meunier (yellow card) 44'; De Bock (yellow card) 90+2'	Summary	Godee (yellow card) 21'; N'Diaye (yellow card) 23'; Sukuta-Pasu (yellow card) 28'; Kabananga 66'; Bačelić-Grgić (yellow card) 71'	Stadium: Jan Breydel Stadium; Attendance: 22,000; Referee: Joeri Van De Velde

24 August 2014	Cercle Brugge	1–0	Lokeren	Bruges, Belgium
20:00 CEST	Kabananga 26'	Summary	Overmeire (yellow card) 33'; Mertens (yellow card) 55'	Stadium: Jan Breydel Stadium; Attendance: 6,106; Referee: Johan Verbist

30 August 2014	Royal Mouscron-Péruwelz	4–0	Cercle Brugge	Mouscron, Belgium
20:00 CEST	Diaby 1' 87'; Michel 15' (pen.); Thibault Peyre (yellow card) 25'; Kevin Vandendriessche (yellow card) 32'; Badri 36'	Summary	Werner (red card) 11'; Dussenne (yellow card) 25'	Stadium: Stade Le Canonnier; Attendance: 5,700; Referee: Wim Smet

13 September 2014	Cercle Brugge	1–0	Charleroi	Bruges, Belgium
20:00 CEST	Dussenne 16'; N'Diaye (yellow card) 38'; D'haene (yellow card) 59'	Summary	Fauré (yellow card) 88'; Marinos (yellow card) 90+5'	Stadium: Jan Breydel Stadium; Attendance: 6,950; Referee: Frederik Geldhof

20 September 2014	Anderlecht	3–2	Cercle Brugge	Brussels, Belgium
20:00 CEST	Mitrović 6'; Suárez 45'; Najar 76'	Summary	Buyl 16' (yellow card) 19'; N'Diaye (yellow card) 52'; Wils (yellow card) 72'; Buysse (yellow card) 75'; Kabananga 90'	Stadium: Constant Vanden Stock Stadium; Referee: Bart Vertenten

27 September 2014	Cercle Brugge	1–2	Westerlo	Bruges, Belgium
20:00 CEST	Dussenne (yellow card) 38'; N'Diaye (yellow card) 51'; Buysse (yellow card) 75'; Van Acker 82'; Wils (yellow card) 85'; Valcke (yellow card) 90+2'	Summary	Aoulad (yellow card) 44'; Raphaël Lecomte 49'; Annys (yellow card) 73'; Gounongbe 76' (pen.)	Stadium: Jan Breydel Stadium; Attendance: 5,850; Referee: Lawrence Visser

4 October 2014	Waasland-Beveren	1–0	Cercle Brugge	Beveren, Belgium
20:00 CEST	Marić (yellow card) 52'; Baldé (yellow card) 57'; Corstjens (yellow card) 78'; Vukušić 81'	Summary	Godee (yellow card) 40'; Buyl (yellow card) 53'; N'Diaye (red card) 59'; Van Acker (yellow card) 84'	Stadium: Freethiel Stadion; Attendance: 4,858; Referee: Thierry Derycke

18 October 2014	Cercle Brugge	1–2	Lierse	Bruges, Belgium
20:00 CEST	Sukuta-Pasu 40' (pen.); Werner (yellow card) 68'	Summary	Masika 10' (yellow card) 57'; Keita 49'; Losada (yellow card) 59'	Stadium: Jan Breydel Stadium; Attendance: 6,896; Referee: Serge Gumienny

25 October 2014	Zulte Waregem	1–2	Cercle Brugge	Waregem, Belgium
20:00 CEST	Bongonda 13'; Skúlason (yellow card) 71'; Labor (yellow card) 71'	Summary	Kabananga 39' 78' (yellow card) 78'; Dussenne (yellow card) 49'; Sukuta-Pasu (yellow card) 69' (yellow-red card); Bačelić-Grgić (yellow card) 71'	Stadium: Regenboogstadion; Attendance: 7,650; Referee: Christof Dierick

29 October 2014	Cercle Brugge	0–1	Standard Liège	Bruges, Belgium
20:30 CEST	Van Roose (yellow card) 30'; Cornelis (yellow card) 90+1'	Summary	Ciman (yellow card) 78'; Watt 88'	Stadium: Jan Breydel Stadium; Attendance: 6,870; Referee: Boucaut

1 November 2014	Cercle Brugge	0–4	Kortrijk	Bruges, Belgium
20:00 CEST	D'Haene (yellow card) 45+1'; Van Acker (yellow card) 71'; Bourdin (yellow card) 86'	Summary	De Mets 4'; Mulemo (yellow card) 33'; Marušić 66' 80'; Poulain (yellow card) 67'; Matton 77'	Stadium: Jan Breydel Stadium; Attendance: 6,950; Referee: Luc Wouters

8 November 2014	KV Mechelen	1–1	Cercle Brugge	Mechelen, Belgium
20:00 CEST	Kosanović (yellow card) 38'; Hanni 60'; Biset (yellow card) 87'; Van Damme (yellow card) 90+2'	Summary	Bačelić-Grgić (yellow card) 24'; Sukuta-Pasu (yellow card) 51'; Dussenne (yellow card) 73'; Kabananga 83'	Stadium: Argosstadion Achter de Kazerne; Attendance: 8,819; Referee: Laurent Colemonts

22 November 2014	Gent	4–0	Cercle Brugge	Ghent, Belgium
20:00 CEST	Dejaegere 14'; Raman 60'; Depoitre 71'; Pollet 82'	Summary	Cornelis (yellow card) 21'; Kabananga (yellow card) 62'; Buysse (yellow card) 90+3'	Stadium: Ghelamco Arena; Attendance: 18,346; Referee: Delferiere

29 November 2014	Cercle Brugge	0–1	Genk	Bruges, Belgium
20:00 CEST	Dussenne (yellow card) 14'; Van Acker (yellow card) 51'	Summary	Schrijvers (yellow card) 54'; Buffel (yellow card) 72'; Mboyo 84'	Stadium: Jan Breydel Stadium; Attendance: 5,850; Referee: Joeri Van De Velde

6 December 2014	Lokeren	0–0	Cercle Brugge	Lokeren, Belgium
20:00 CEST	Marić (yellow card) 56'	Summary	Van Acker (yellow card) 25'; Kabananga (yellow card) 59'; Faris Haroun (yellow card) 84'; Buyl (yellow card) 90'	Stadium: Daknamstadion; Attendance: 6,846; Referee: Boucaut

13 December 2014	Cercle Brugge	2–1	Royal Mouscron-Péruwelz	Bruges, Belgium
20:00 CEST	Kabananga 5'; Bourdin (yellow card) 45+1'; Buyl 68'; Van Acker (yellow card) 77'	Summary	Mézague (yellow card) 37'; Diaby 40'; Benjamin Delacourt (yellow card) 44'; Mohamed (yellow card) 60'	Stadium: Jan Breydel Stadium; Attendance: 7,180; Referee: Jonathan Lardot

20 December 2014	Oostende	2–0	Cercle Brugge	Ostend, Belgium
20:00 CEST	Jali (yellow card) 10'; Siani 36' (pen.); Brillant (yellow card) 68' wilmet 90+3'	Summary	D'haene (yellow card) 32' (yellow-red card); Werner (yellow card) 35'; Buyl (yellow card) 83'	Stadium: Albertpark; Attendance: 6,447; Referee: Luc Wouters

27 December 2014	Cercle Brugge	1–0	Waasland-Beveren	Bruges, Belgium
20:00 CEST	Buyl 13'; Haroun (yellow card) 27'; Dussenne (yellow card) 32' (yellow-red card); Kabananga (yellow card) 58'	Summary	Robson (yellow card) 47'; Coosemans (yellow card) 64'	Stadium: Jan Breydel Stadium; Attendance: 7,126; Referee: Sébastien Delferiere

17 January 2015	Charleroi	0–2	Cercle Brugge	Charleroi, Belgium
20:00 CEST	François (yellow card) 26'; Dewaest (yellow card) 32'	Summary	Martens (yellow card) 18'; Van Acker (yellow card) 23'; Bačelić-Grgić (yellow card) 70'; Jinty Caenepeel 79'; Buyl 87'	Stadium: Stade du Pays de Charleroi; Attendance: 7,370; Referee: Bart Vertenten

25 January 2015	Cercle Brugge	0–3	Club Brugge	Bruges, Belgium
18:00 CEST	Werner (yellow card) 27'; Van Acker (yellow card) 73'	Summary	Izquierdo 33' 89'; Felipe Gedoz 80'	Stadium: Jan Breydel Stadium; Attendance: 14,500; Referee: Johan Verbist

31 January 2015	Westerlo	1–0	Cercle Brugge	Westerlo, Belgium
20:00 CET	Apau 52'; Annys (yellow card) 73'	Summary	Godee (yellow card) 72'	Stadium: Het Kuipje; Attendance: 6,500; Referee: Wim Smet

8 February 2015	Cercle Brugge	0–2	Anderlecht	Bruges, Belgium
18:00 CET	Buyl (yellow card) 28'; Dussenne (yellow card) 76'	Summary	Vanden Borre 40'; Defour 85'	Stadium: Jan Breydel Stadium; Attendance: 13,143; Referee: Serge Gumienny

14 February 2015	Lierse	2–1	Cercle Brugge	Lier, Belgium
20:00 CET	Zizo (yellow card) 21' (yellow-red card); Ahmed Hassan 49'; Kasmi 73'	Summary	Dussenne (yellow card) 38'; Van Acker (yellow card) 65'; Buysse (yellow card) 66'; Kabananga (yellow card) 69'; D'haene 81'	Stadium: Herman Vanderpoortenstadion; Attendance: 5,900; Referee: Laurent Colemonts

21 February 2015	Cercle Brugge	2–2	Zulte Waregem	Bruges, Belgium
20:00 CET	Maertens (yellow card) 64'; Caenpeel (yellow card) 68'; Werner (yellow card) 70'; Kabananga 72'; Sukuta-Pasu 77' (pen.)	Summary	Jørgensen 19'; Kaya 44'; Cordaro (red card) 45'; Rossi (yellow card) 50'; Cissako (yellow card) 75'; D'Haene (yellow card) 76'; Skúlason (red card) 81'; Aneke (yellow card) 84'	Stadium: Jan Breydel Stadium; Attendance: 6,673; Referee: Nicolas Laforge

27 February 2015	Standard Liège	1–0	Cercle Brugge	Liège, Belgium
20:30 CET	De Sart (yellow card) 55'; Faty 89'	Summary	Buyl (yellow card) 26'; Kabananga (yellow card) 51'; Maertens (yellow card) 75'	Stadium: Stade Maurice Dufrasne; Attendance: 24,693; Referee: Denis Vanbecelaere

7 March 2015	K.V. Kortrijk	1–0	Cercle Brugge	Kortrijk, Belgium
20:00 CET	De Smet (yellow card) 57'; Chevalier (yellow card) 60' (goal) 72'; Tomašević (yellow card) 84'; Poulain (yellow card) 90+3'; Santini (yellow card) 90+6'	Summary	Maertens (yellow card) 58'; D'haene (yellow card) 63'; Bourdin (yellow card) 76'; Smolders (yellow card) 87'	Stadium: Guldensporen Stadion; Attendance: 8,768; Referee: Serge Gumienny

15 March 2015	Cercle Brugge	2–3	KV Mechelen	Bruges, Belgium
14:30 CET	Buyl (yellow card) 30' (goal) 35' 80'; Cornelis (yellow card) 54'; Dussenne (red card) 90+1'	Summary	Kosanović (yellow card) 39'; Wolski 89' 90+2'; Veselinović 90+1' (pen.)	Stadium: Jan Breydel Stadium; Attendance: 8,750; Referee: Bart Vertenten

=== Relegation Play off ===
4 April 2015	Cercle Brugge	2–3	Lierse S.K.	Bruges, Belgium
20:00 CET	D'haene 13'; Van Roose (yellow card) 40'; Dewaele 45+2'	Summary	Velikonja 28'; Wanderson 34'; Zico (yellow card) 38'; Kasmi 78'; Bajković (yellow card) 87'	Stadium: Jan Breydel Stadium; Attendance: 7,481; Referee: Sébastien Delferiere

10 April 2015	Lierse S.K.	0–1	Cercle Brugge	Lier, Belgium
20:30 CET	Karim Hafez (yellow card) 39'; Messaoudi (yellow card) 59'; Velikonja (yellow card) 63'	Summary	Bourdin (yellow card) 5'; Martens (yellow card) 19'; D'haene 23'; Dewaele (yellow card) 67'	Stadium: Herman Vanderpoortenstadion; Referee: Christof Dierick

17 April 2015	Cercle Brugge	0–2	Lierse S.K.	Bruges, Belgium
20:30 CET	Kabananga (yellow card) 30'; D'haene (yellow card) 62'	Summary	Velikonja 17'; Karim Hafez 85'; Bajković (yellow card) 90+1'	Stadium: Jan Breydel Stadium; Attendance: 7,239; Referee: Luc Wouters

26 April 2015	Lierse S.K.	3–1	Cercle Brugge	Lier, Belgium
20:00 CET	Zizo (yellow card) 64' (yellow-red card); Bourdin 67' (o.g.); Bensebaini 81' (yellow card) 81'; Diomandé 88'	Summary	Martens 20'; Haroun (yellow card) 32'; Dussenne (yellow card) 66'; Van Acker (yellow card) 83'	Stadium: Herman Vanderpoortenstadion; Attendance: 7,838; Referee: Serge Gumienny

=== Belgian Cup ===
24 September 2014	K.FC.Sp.St-Gillis Waas	1–7	Cercle Brugge	Nieuwkerken-Waas
20:00 CEST	Jim Van Osselaer 81' (pen.)	Summary	Dussenne 7'; Valcke 22' 29'; Godee 55'; Buyl 76' 86'; Van Roose 90+2'	Stadium: Sportcentrum Meesterstraat; Referee: Johan Verbist

2 December 2014 Last 16	Cercle Brugge	3–0 (a.e.t.)	KVV Coxyde	Bruges
20:00 CEST	Cornelis (yellow card) 42'; Bourdin 105+1'; D'haene 108'; Mathieu Maertens 116'	Summary	Karel Ternier (yellow card) 80'	Stadium: Jan Breydel Stadium; Attendance: 3,000; Referee: Denis Vanbecelaere

17 December 2014 Quarter-finals, first leg	Charleroi	2–1	Cercle Brugge	Charleroi
20:00 CEST	Fauré 26' 29'; Kebano (yellow card) 49'	Summary	Dussenne (yellow card) 31'; Smolders 40'; Van Acker (yellow card) 55'	Stadium: Stade du Pays de Charleroi; Attendance: 3,652; Referee: Christof Dierick

21 January 2015 Quarter-finals, second leg	Cercle Brugge	2–0 (3–2 agg.)	Charleroi	Bruges
20:30 CET	Dussenne (yellow card) 62'; Muzaqi 67'; Smolders (yellow card) 82'; Buyl 90+7'	Summary	François (yellow card) 58'; Coulibaly (yellow card) 72'	Stadium: Jan Breydel Stadium; Attendance: 1,200; Referee: Alexandre Boucaut

3 February 2015 Semi-finals, first leg	Club Brugge	5–1	Cercle Brugge	Bruges
20:45 CET	Felipe Gedoz 14'; De Sutter 49'; Víctor Vázquez 63'; Izquierdo 78'; Storm 88'	Summary	Bourdin (yellow card) 20' (yellow-red card); Bačelić-Grgić 45' (yellow card) 49'; Maertens (yellow card) 61'; Buyl (yellow card) 73'	Stadium: Jan Breydel Stadium; Attendance: 16,000; Referee: Joeri Van De Velde

11 February 2015 Semi-finals, second leg	Cercle Brugge	2–3 (3–8 agg.)	Club Brugge	Bruges
20:45 CET	Verkindere (yellow card) 60'; Sukuta-Pasu (yellow card) 71' (goal) 74'; Cornelis (yellow card) 87'; Buyl 89'	Summary	Bolingoli-Mbombo 45' 76'; De fauw 50'; Duarte (red card) 52'	Stadium: Jan Breydel Stadium; Attendance: 3,000; Referee: Christof Dierick

== Appearances and goals ==
No.	Pos.	Name	League		Cup		Other		Total		Discipline	
No.	Pos.	Name	Apps	Goals	Apps	Goals	Apps	Goals	Apps	Goals	Yellow card	Red card
1	GK	(Belgium) Olivier Werner	0	0	0	0	0	0	0	0	0	0
4	DF	(Belgium) Bart Buysse	0	0	0	0	0	0	0	0	0	0
7	MF	(Belgium) Tim Smolders	0	0	0	0	0	0	0	0	0	0
8	DF	(Belgium) Hans Cornelis	0	0	0	0	0	0	0	0	0	0
10	FW	(Nigeria) Michael Uchebo	0	0	0	0	0	0	0	0	0	0
11	FW	(Cameroon) Gaël Etock	0	0	0	0	0	0	0	0	0	0
12	MF	(Belgium) Frederik Boi	0	0	0	0	0	0	0	0	0	0
16	GK	(Belgium) Miguel Van Damme	0	0	0	0	0	0	0	0	0	0
17	MF	(Belgium) Jilke Deconinck	0	0	0	0	0	0	0	0	0	0
20	MF	(Senegal) Ismaïla N'Diaye	0	0	0	0	0	0	0	0	0	0
21	MF	(Belgium) Ayron Verkindere	0	0	0	0	0	0	0	0	0	0
24	DF	(Belgium) Dennes De Kegel	0	0	0	0	0	0	0	0	0	0
26	DF	(Belgium) Stef Wils	0	0	0	0	0	0	0	0	0	0
27	MF	(Belgium) Gilles Dewaele	0	0	0	0	0	0	0	0	0	0
28	MF	(Belgium) Karel Van Roose	0	0	0	0	0	0	0	0	0	0
29	DF	(Belgium) Jasper Ameye	0	0	0	0	0	0	0	0	0	0
30	FW	(Belgium) Kristof D'haene	0	0	0	0	0	0	0	0	0	0
33	MF	(Belgium) Mathieu Maertens	0	0	0	0	0	0	0	0	0	0
39	GK	(Belgium) Jo Coppens	0	0	0	0	0	0	0	0	0	0
40	MF	(Belgium) Stephen Buyl	0	0	0	0	0	0	0	0	0	0
41	MF	(Belgium) Thibaut Van Acker	0	0	0	0	0	0	0	0	0	0
89	FW	(Democratic Republic of the Congo) Junior Kabananga	0	0	0	0	0	0	0	0	0	0
–	GK	(Belgium) Thomas De Bie	0	0	0	0	0	0	0	0	0	0
–	DF	(France) Pierre Bourdin	0	0	0	0	0	0	0	0	0	0
–	DF	(Belgium) Koenraad Hendrickx	0	0	0	0	0	0	0	0	0	0
–	MF	(Croatia) Stipe Bačelić-Grgić	0	0	0	0	0	0	0	0	0	0
–	DF	(Belgium) Noë Dussenne	0	0	0	0	0	0	0	0	0	0
–	MF	(Belgium) Lukas Van Eenoo	0	0	0	0	0	0	0	0	0	0
–	FW	(Germany) Richard Sukuta-Pasu	0	0	0	0	0	0	0	0	0	0
–	FW	(Belgium) Sam Valcke	0	0	0	0	0	0	0	0	0	0
–	FW	(Netherlands) Joey Godee	0	0	0	0	0	0	0	0	0	0

== Transfers ==
=== Transfers in ===
Position	Player	Transferred from	Fee	Date	Ref.
FW	(Belgium) Sam Valcke	(Belgium) Londerzeel	Undisclosed	4 March 2014	
GK	(Belgium) Olivier Werner	(Belgium) Mons	Undisclosed	20 March 2014	
GK	(Belgium) Thomas De Bie	(Belgium) Mechelen	Free	17 April 2014	
FW	(Germany) Richard Sukuta-Pasu	(Germany) Kaiserslautern	Undisclosed	16 May 2014	
MF	(Croatia) Stipe Bačelić-Grgić	(Croatia) Hrvatski Dragovoljac	Undisclosed	12 June 2014	
MF	(France) Pierre Bourdin	(France) Paris Saint-Germain	Undisclosed	13 June 2014	
DF	(Belgium) Noë Dussenne	(Belgium) Mons	Free	14 June 2014	

=== Loans in ===
Position	Player	Loaned from	Date	Loan expires	Ref.

=== Transfers out ===
Position	Player	Transferred to	Fee	Date	Ref.
DF	(Belgium) Thomas Goddeeris	(Belgium) Torhout 1992 KM	Undisclosed	25 April 2014	
GK	(Belgium) Bram Verbist	(Netherlands) Roda JC Kerkrade	Free	28 June 2014	

=== Loans out ===
Position	Player	Loaned to	Date	Loan expires	Ref.
FW	(Belgium) Arne Naudts	(Belgium) Deinze	23 May 2014	End of season	
MF	(Belgium) Alessio Staelens	(Belgium) Deinze	4 July 2014	End of season	
