= 2013 Belgian Cup final =

- Event: 2012–13 Belgian Cup
Cercle Brugge	Genk
0	2
- Date: 9 May 2013
- Venue: King Baudouin Stadium, Brussels
- Referee: Johan Verbist
- Attendance: 43,000

The 2013 Belgian Cup final, named Cofidis Cup after the sponsor, took place on 9 May 2013 between Genk and Cercle Brugge. It was the 58th Belgian Cup final and was won by Genk, with two late goals by Bennard Yao Kumordzi and Jelle Vossen.

== Route to the final ==
Cercle Brugge				Genk
Opponent	Result	Legs	Round	Opponent	Result	Legs
Hoogstraten	3–1	3–1 away	Sixth round	Union	6–0	6–0 away
Club Brugge	1–0	1–0 away	Seventh round	Standard Liège	1–0	1–0 home
Oostende	4–2	2–1 home; 2–1 away	Quarter-finals	Zulte Waregem	5–1	5–0 away; 0–1 home
Kortrijk	4–3	2–1 home; 2–2 away (a.e.t.)	Semi-finals	Anderlecht	1–1 (7–6 p)	0–1 away; 1–0 home

== Match ==
=== Details ===
9 May 2013
20:45 CEST

Cercle Brugge	0–2	Genk
	Report; Line-ups	Kumordzi 85'; Vossen 89'

King Baudouin Stadium, Brussels
Attendance: 43,000
Referee: Johan Verbist

Cercle Brugge	Genk

GK	25	(Belgium) Bram Verbist
RB	8	(Belgium) Hans Cornelis (c)
CB	26	(Belgium) Stef Wils
CB	5	(Belgium) Gregory Mertens
LB	30	(Belgium) Kristof D'haene		(substituted off) 87'
CM	6	(Iceland) Arnar Viðarsson	(yellow card) 84'
CM	7	(Belgium) Tim Smolders
AM	21	(Portugal) William Carvalho
RW	12	(Belgium) Frederik Boi		(substituted off) 66'
CF	10	(Nigeria) Michael Uchebo
LW	14	(Portugal) Rudy		(substituted off) 86'
Substitutes:
GK	39	(Belgium) Jo Coppens
DF	19	(Ghana) Francis Dickoh
MF	24	(Belgium) Lukas Van Eenoo
MF	28	(Belgium) Karel Van Roose
FW	11	(Norway) Mushaga Bakenga		(substituted on) 66'
FW	15	(Uruguay) Joaquín Boghossian		(substituted on) 87'
FW	40	(Belgium) Stephen Buyl		(substituted on) 86'
Manager:
(Belgium) Lorenzo Staelens

GK	26	(Hungary) László Köteles
RB	16	(South Africa) Anele Ngcongca
CB	5	(Senegal) Kalidou Koulibaly
CB	17	(Belgium) Jeroen Simaeys
LB	3	(Belgium) Katuku Tshimanga
RW	19	(Belgium) Thomas Buffel
CM	7	(Trinidad and Tobago) Khaleem Hyland
CM	45	(Ghana) Bennard Kumordzi
LW	8	(France) Steeven Joseph-Monrose		(substituted off) 81'
AM	23	(Belgium) Benjamin De Ceulaer	(yellow card) 52'	(substituted off) 72'
CF	9	(Belgium) Jelle Vossen (c)		(substituted off) 90+2'
Substitutes:
GK	22	(Belgium) Kristof Van Hout
DF	6	(Nigeria) Kim Ojo
DF	11	(Denmark) Brian Hamalainen
MF	2	(Senegal) Kara Mbodj
MF	10	(France) Julien Gorius		(substituted on) 90+2'
FW	14	(Netherlands) Glynor Plet		(substituted on) 81'
FW	18	(Israel) Elyaniv Barda		(substituted on) 72'
Manager:
(Netherlands) Mario Been

Assistant referees:
(Belgium) Kristof Meers
(Belgium) Dirk Gilon
Fourth official:
(Belgium) Jeroen Walschap

Match rules

- 90 minutes.
- 30 minutes of extra time if necessary.
- Penalty shoot-out if scores still level.
- Seven named substitutes.
- Maximum of three substitutions.
