= List of Belgian football transfers winter 2013–14 =

This is a list of Belgian football transfers for the 2013-14 winter transfer window. Only transfers involving a team from the Belgian Pro League are listed.

The winter transfer window opens on 1 January 2014, although a few transfers may take place prior to that date. The window closes at midnight on 1 February 2014 although outgoing transfers might still happen to leagues in which the window is still open. Players without a club may join teams, either during or in between transfer windows.

== Sorted by date ==
=== December 2013 ===
Date	Name	Moving from	Moving to	Fee	Note
December 8, 2013	(Belgium) Wouter Moreels	(Belgium) Oostende	(Belgium) Deinze	Loan	
December 20, 2013	(Spain) César Arzo	(Belgium) Gent	(Spain) Real Zaragoza	Undisclosed	
December 20, 2013	(Belgium) Thomas Goddeeris	(Belgium) Cercle Brugge	(Belgium) Torhout	Loan	
December 20, 2013	(Belgium) Gianni Vanlandschoot	(Belgium) Cercle Brugge	(Belgium) Torhout	Loan	
December 23, 2013	(Croatia) Ante Puljić	(Croatia) Dinamo Zagreb	(Belgium) Gent	Undisclosed	(Note: Puljić was on loan from Dinamo Zagreb to Lokomotiva during the first half of the 2013-14 season. The loan deal ended and Puljić transferred to Gent.)
December 23, 2013	(Belgium) Olivier Renard	(Belgium) Charleroi	Free Agent	Retired	(Note: Renard decided to end his career as he got an offer from KV Mechelen to become part of the staff as an assistant to Fi Vanhoof.)
December 23, 2013	(France) Jérémy Taravel	(Belgium) Lokeren	(Croatia) Dinamo Zagreb	Undisclosed	
December 24, 2013	(Belgium) Onur Kaya	(Belgium) Charleroi	(Belgium) Lokeren	Undisclosed	
December 24, 2013	(Italy) Gaetano Monachello	(Belgium) Cercle Brugge	(France) Monaco	Loan Return	
December 24, 2013	(Belgium) Enes Sağlık	(Belgium) Lokeren	(Belgium) Charleroi	Undisclosed	
December 26, 2013	(Belgium) Anthony Moris	(Belgium) Standard Liège	(Belgium) Sint-Truiden	Loan	
December 27, 2013	(Sweden) Pär Ericsson	(Sweden) Göteborg	(Belgium) Mons	Undisclosed	(Note: Ericsson was on loan from Göteborg to Mjällby during the first half of the 2013-14 season. The loan deal ended and Ericsson transferred to Mons.)
December 31, 2013	(Greece) Spyros Fourlanos	(Belgium) Club Brugge	(Greece) AEL Kalloni	Loan	
December 31, 2013	(Italy) Alessandro Iandoli	(Belgium) Standard Liège	(Belgium) Sint-Truiden	Loan Return	
December 31, 2013	(Belgium) Arne Naudts	(Belgium) KRC Mechelen	(Belgium) Cercle Brugge	Loan Return	
December 31, 2013	(Belgium) Tjakke Stevens	(Belgium) Zulte Waregem	(Belgium) Torhout	Loan	
December 31, 2013	(Belgium) Lukas Van Eenoo	(Belgium) Cercle Brugge	(Belgium) OH Leuven	Loan	

=== January 2014 ===
Date	Name	Moving from	Moving to	Fee	Note
January 1, 2014	(Belgium) Junior Malanda	(Belgium) Zulte Waregem	(Germany) VfL Wolfsburg	Loan Return	
January 3, 2014	(Sweden) Astrit Ajdarević	(Belgium) Standard Liège	(England) Charlton Athletic	Loan	
January 3, 2014	(Belgium) Cédric Buekers	(Belgium) OH Leuven	(Belgium) Heist	Loan	
January 3, 2014	(Belgium) Gregory Mertens	(Belgium) Cercle Brugge	(Belgium) Lokeren	€700 000	
January 3, 2014	(Belgium) Matz Sels	(Belgium) Lierse	(Belgium) Gent	Undisclosed	
January 3, 2014	(Greece) Valentinos Vlachos	(Belgium) Club Brugge	(Greece) Aris	Loan	
January 4, 2014	(Belgium) Andreas Luckermans	(Belgium) Anderlecht	(Netherlands) Helmond Sport	Loan	
January 5, 2014	(Belgium) Salvatore Crimi	(Belgium) Zulte Waregem	(Belgium) Charleroi	Loan	
January 5, 2014	(Central African Republic) Habib Habibou	(Belgium) Zulte Waregem	(Belgium) Gent	Undisclosed	
January 6, 2014	(Cameroon) Steve Beleck	(Belgium) Mons	(Italy) Udinese	Loan Return	
January 6, 2014	(Belgium) Koenraad Hendrickx	(Belgium) Cercle Brugge	(Belgium) Woluwe Zaventem	Loan	
January 9, 2014	(Serbia) Miloš Kosanović	(Poland) Cracovia	(Belgium) Mechelen	Undisclosed	
January 9, 2014	(Turkey) Alpaslan Öztürk	(Belgium) Standard Liège	(Turkey) Kasımpaşa	Loan	
January 9, 2014	(France) Alassane També	(Belgium) Kortrijk	(Belgium) Antwerp	Loan	
January 12, 2014	(Senegal) Ismaïla N'Diaye	(Belgium) Kortrijk	(Belgium) Cercle Brugge	Undisclosed	
January 12, 2014	(Hungary) Ádám Vass	(Belgium) Oostende	Free Agent	Released	
January 13, 2014	(Israel) Dudu Biton	(Belgium) Standard Liège	(Spain) Alcorcón	Loan	
January 13, 2014	(Ivory Coast) Sekou Cissé	(Netherlands) Feyenoord	(Belgium) Genk	Free	
January 13, 2014	(Democratic Republic of the Congo) Zola Matumona	(Angola) Primeiro do Agosto	(Belgium) Mons	Undisclosed	
January 13, 2014	(France) Yohann Thuram-Ulien	(Belgium) Standard Liège	(England) Charlton Athletic	Loan	
January 14, 2014	(Senegal) Papa Sene	(Belgium) Cercle Brugge	(Belgium) Oosterzonen Oosterwijk	Loan	
January 14, 2014	(Egypt) Ahmed Yasser	(Belgium) Lierse	(Egypt) Wadi Degla	Loan	
January 15, 2014	(Ivory Coast) Zié Diabaté	(France) Dijon	(Belgium) Gent	Loan	
January 15, 2014	(Switzerland) Danijel Milićević	(Belgium) Charleroi	(Belgium) Gent	Undisclosed	
January 16, 2014	(Uruguay) Guillermo Méndez	(Belgium) Standard Liège	(Spain) Alcorcón	Loan	(Note: Méndez was on loan from Standard Liège to Sint-Truiden during the first half of the 2013-14 season. The loan deal ended and Méndez was loaned to Alcorcón.)
January 17, 2014	(Brazil) Bruno	(Belgium) Lierse	(Belgium) Dessel Sport	Loan	
January 17, 2014	(Panama) Roberto Chen	(Spain) Málaga	(Belgium) Zulte Waregem	Loan	
January 20, 2014	(Cameroon) Fabrice Olinga	(Spain) Málaga	(Belgium) Zulte Waregem	Loan	
January 21, 2014	(Egypt) Ahmed Samir Farag	(Belgium) Lierse	Free Agent	Released	
January 23, 2014	(Belgium) Yohan Brouckaert	(Belgium) Oostende	(Belgium) Mouscron-Péruwelz	Undisclosed	
January 23, 2014	(Spain) Pau Cendrós	(Belgium) Gent	(Spain) Alcorcón	Free	
January 23, 2014	(Belgium) Yassine El Ghanassy	(Belgium) Gent	(United Arab Emirates) Al Ain	Loan	
January 23, 2014	(Nigeria) Reuben Gabriel	(Scotland) Kilmarnock	(Belgium) Waasland-Beveren	Free	
January 23, 2014	(Zambia) Rodgers Kola	(Belgium) Gent	(Israel) Ironi Kiryat Shmona	Loan	
January 25, 2014	(Ivory Coast) Bobley Anderson	(Spain) Málaga	(Belgium) Zulte Waregem	Loan	
January 25, 2014	(South Africa) Andile Jali	(South Africa) Orlando Pirates	(Belgium) Oostende	Undisclosed	
January 25, 2014	(Belgium) Bram Verbist	(Belgium) Cercle Brugge	(Denmark) Brøndby	Free	
January 27, 2014	(Turkey) Anıl Koç	(Belgium) Standard Liège	(England) Charlton Athletic	Loan	
January 27, 2014	(Germany) Marvin Pourié	(Denmark) Copenhagen	(Belgium) Zulte Waregem	Loan	
January 27, 2014	(Belgium) Georgiy Zhukov	(Belgium) Standard Liège	(Kazakhstan) Astana	Loan	
January 28, 2014	(Senegal) Mbaye Diagne	(Italy) Juventus	(Belgium) Lierse	Loan	
January 28, 2014	(Guinea) Zainoul Haidara	(Belgium) OH Leuven	Free Agent	Released	
January 28, 2014	(France) Clément Tainmont	(France) Châteauroux	(Belgium) Charleroi	Undisclosed	
January 29, 2014	(Belgium) Dennes De Kegel	(Belgium) Genk	(Belgium) Cercle Brugge	Undisclosed	
January 29, 2014	(Iceland) Stefán Gíslason	(Belgium) OH Leuven	(Iceland) Breiðablik	Free	
January 29, 2014	(France) Jimmy Kamghain	(Belgium) Kortrijk	(Belgium) Roeselare	Loan	
January 29, 2014	(Belgium) Marvin Ogunjimi	(Belgium) OH Leuven	(Spain) Mallorca	Loan Return	(Note: Ogunjimi was on loan from Mallorca to OH Leuven for the full 2013-14 season, however OH Leuven and Ogunjimi mutually agreed to terminate the contract early.)
January 29, 2014	(Portugal) Nuno Reis	(Portugal) Sporting	(Belgium) Cercle Brugge	Loan	
January 29, 2014	(Latvia) Valērijs Šabala	(Belgium) Club Brugge	(Latvia) Skonto	Loan	(Note: Šabala was signed by Club Brugge from Skonto but as part of the agreement he was loaned back to Skonto until the end of the season.)
January 30, 2014	(Egypt) Louay Badr	(Belgium) Turnhout	(Belgium) Lierse	Undisclosed	
January 30, 2014	(Chile) Nicolás Castillo	(Chile) Universidad Católica	(Belgium) Club Brugge	€3 000 000	
January 30, 2014	(Algeria) Kamel Ghilas	(France) Reims	(Belgium) Charleroi	Undisclosed	
January 30, 2014	(Iran) Reza Ghoochannejhad	(Belgium) Standard Liège	(England) Charlton Athletic	Undisclosed	
January 30, 2014	(The Gambia) Ibou	(Qatar) Muaither	(Belgium) OH Leuven	Loan Return	(Note: Ibou was on loan from OH Leuven to Muaither for the full 2013-14 season, however Ibou and Muaither mutually agreed to terminate the contract early, allowing him to come back early.)
January 30, 2014	(Belgium) Benjamin Lambot	(Belgium) Lierse	(Azerbaijan) Simurq	Undisclosed	
January 30, 2014	(Belgium) Anthony Limbombe	(Belgium) Genk	(Belgium) Lierse	Loan	
January 30, 2014	(Belgium) David Pollet	(Belgium) Charleroi	(Belgium) Anderlecht	Undisclosed	
January 30, 2014	(France) Romain Reynaud	(Belgium) Kortrijk	(Belgium) OH Leuven	Loan	
January 30, 2014	(Belgium) Wannes Van Tricht	(Belgium) Mechelen	(Belgium) ASV Geel	Loan	
January 31, 2014	(Belgium) Thomas Azevedo	(Belgium) OH Leuven	(Netherlands) Go Ahead Eagles	Loan	
January 31, 2014	(Belgium) Jordy Croux	(Belgium) Genk	(Belgium) OH Leuven	Loan	
January 31, 2014	(Uruguay) Carlos Diogo	(Belgium) Gent	Free Agent	Released	
January 31, 2014	(France) Cédric Fauré	(France) Guingamp	(Belgium) Charleroi	Free	
January 31, 2014	(France) Harlem Gnohéré	(Belgium) Charleroi	(Belgium) Mouscron-Péruwelz	Loan	
January 31, 2014	(Belgium) Laurent Henkinet	(Belgium) Standard Liège	(Belgium) Dessel Sport	Loan	
January 31, 2014	(Montenegro) Nebojša Kosović	(Belgium) Standard Liège	(Hungary) Újpest	Loan	(Note: Kosović was signed by Standard from Vojvodina and immediately loaned out to Újpest for the remainder of the season.)
January 31, 2014	(Democratic Republic of the Congo) Mulopo Kudimbana	(Belgium) Oostende	(Belgium) Anderlecht	Loan	
January 31, 2014	(Belgium) Jonathan Legear	(Russia) Terek Grozny	(Belgium) Mechelen	Free	
January 31, 2014	(Democratic Republic of the Congo) Jean-Marc Makusu Mundele	(Democratic Republic of the Congo) SC Bel'Or	(Belgium) Standard Liège	Undisclosed	
January 31, 2014	(Portugal) Elton Monteiro	(Belgium) Club Brugge	(Portugal) Académica de Coimbra	Loan	
January 31, 2014	(Belgium) Lamisha Musonda	(England) Chelsea	(Belgium) Mechelen	Free	
January 31, 2014	(Belgium) Dieumerci Ndongala	(Belgium) La Louvière Centre	(Belgium) Charleroi	Undisclosed	
January 31, 2014	(Belgium) Willem Ofori-Appiah	(Belgium) Genk	(Belgium) Dessel Sport	Loan	
January 31, 2014	(Belgium) Gilles Sallaets	(Belgium) Mechelen	(Belgium) Rupel Boom	Loan	
January 31, 2014	(Belgium) Frederik Spruyt	(Belgium) Genk	(Belgium) Dessel Sport	Loan	
January 31, 2014	(Spain) Fede Vico	(Belgium) Anderlecht	(Belgium) Oostende	Loan	
January 31, 2014	(Serbia) Uroš Vitas	(Serbia) Rad Belgrade	(Belgium) Gent	Undisclosed	

=== February 2014 ===
Date	Name	Moving from	Moving to	Fee	Note
February 3, 2014	(France) Rémi Maréval	(Belgium) Gent	(Israel) Maccabi Tel Aviv	Undisclosed	
February 4, 2014	(Belgium) David Hubert	(Belgium) Gent	(Israel) Hapoel Be'er Sheva	Loan	
February 12, 2014	(Ghana) Enoch Kofi Adu	(Belgium) Club Brugge	(Norway) Stabæk	Loan	

== Sorted by team ==
=== Anderlecht ===
In:

No.	Pos.	Nation	Player
—	GK	COD	Mulopo Kudimbana (on loan from (Belgium) Oostende)
—	FW	BEL	David Pollet (from (Belgium) Charleroi)

Out:

No.	Pos.	Nation	Player
29	MF	ESP	Fede Vico (on loan to (Belgium) Oostende)
—	MF	BEL	Andreas Luckermans (on loan to (Netherlands) Helmond Sport)

=== Cercle Brugge ===
In:

No.	Pos.	Nation	Player
5	DF	POR	Nuno Reis (on loan from (Portugal) Sporting)
20	MF	SEN	Ismaïla N'Diaye (from (Belgium) Kortrijk)
34	FW	BEL	Arne Naudts (loan return from (Belgium) KRC Mechelen)
—	DF	BEL	Dennes De Kegel (from (Belgium) Genk)

Out:

No.	Pos.	Nation	Player
2	DF	BEL	Koenraad Hendrickx (on loan to (Belgium) Woluwe Zaventem)
5	DF	BEL	Gregory Mertens (to (Belgium) Lokeren)
20	DF	BEL	Thomas Goddeeris (on loan to (Belgium) Torhout)
24	MF	BEL	Lukas Van Eenoo (on loan to (Belgium) OH Leuven)
25	GK	BEL	Bram Verbist (to (Denmark) Brøndby)
73	FW	ITA	Gaetano Monachello (loan return to (France) Monaco)
—	FW	SEN	Papa Sene (on loan to (Belgium) Oosterzonen Oosterwijk)
—	DF	BEL	Gianni Vanlandschoot (on loan to (Belgium) Torhout)

=== Charleroi ===
In:

No.	Pos.	Nation	Player
7	MF	FRA	Clément Tainmont (from (France) Châteauroux)
10	FW	ALG	Kamel Ghilas (from (France) Reims)
18	FW	FRA	Cédric Fauré (from (France) Guingamp)
24	GK	BEL	Salvatore Crimi (from (Belgium) Zulte Waregem)
27	MF	BEL	Enes Sağlık (from (Belgium) Lokeren)
88	MF	BEL	Dieumerci Ndongala (from (Belgium) La Louvière Centre)

Out:

No.	Pos.	Nation	Player
10	FW	BEL	David Pollet (to (Belgium) Anderlecht)
24	GK	BEL	Olivier Renard (released)
31	FW	FRA	Harlem Gnohéré (on loan to (Belgium) Mouscron-Péruwelz)
34	MF	BEL	Onur Kaya (to (Belgium) Lokeren)
77	MF	SUI	Danijel Milićević (to (Belgium) Gent)

=== Club Brugge ===
In:

No.	Pos.	Nation	Player
30	FW	CHI	Nicolás Castillo (from (Chile) Universidad Católica)

Out:

No.	Pos.	Nation	Player
6	MF	GHA	Enoch Kofi Adu (on loan to (Norway) Stabæk)
20	MF	GRE	Spyros Fourlanos (on loan to (Greece) AEL Kalloni)
24	DF	GRE	Valentinos Vlachos (on loan to (Greece) Aris)
27	DF	POR	Elton Monteiro (on loan to (Portugal) Académica de Coimbra)
—	FW	LVA	Valērijs Šabala (signed from (Latvia) Skonto, but immediately loaned out to the same team)

=== Genk ===
In:

No.	Pos.	Nation	Player
21	FW	CIV	Sekou Cissé (from (Netherlands) Feyenoord)

Out:

No.	Pos.	Nation	Player
35	MF	BEL	Anthony Limbombe (on loan to (Belgium) Lierse)
37	MF	BEL	Jordy Croux (on loan to (Belgium) OH Leuven)
42	DF	BEL	Willem Ofori-Appiah (on loan to (Belgium) Dessel Sport)
—	DF	BEL	Dennes De Kegel (to (Belgium) Cercle Brugge)
—	DF	BEL	Frederik Spruyt (on loan to (Belgium) Dessel Sport)

=== Gent ===
In:

No.	Pos.	Nation	Player
1	GK	BEL	Matz Sels (from (Belgium) Lierse)
7	FW	CTA	Habib Habibou (from (Belgium) Zulte Waregem)
13	DF	CRO	Ante Puljić (from (Croatia) Dinamo Zagreb)
15	DF	CIV	Zié Diabaté (on loan from (France) Dijon)
77	MF	SUI	Danijel Milićević (from (Belgium) Charleroi)
—	DF	SRB	Uroš Vitas (from (Serbia) Rad Belgrade)

Out:

No.	Pos.	Nation	Player
2	DF	URU	Carlos Diogo (released)
14	MF	BEL	David Hubert (on loan to (Israel) Hapoel Be'er Sheva)
15	DF	ESP	César Arzo (to (Spain) Real Zaragoza)
16	FW	ZAM	Rodgers Kola (on loan to (Israel) Ironi Kiryat Shmona)
22	DF	ESP	Pau Cendrós (to (Spain) Alcorcón)
31	DF	FRA	Rémi Maréval (to (Israel) Maccabi Tel Aviv)
90	MF	BEL	Yassine El Ghanassy (on loan to (United Arab Emirates) Al Ain)

=== Kortrijk ===
In:

No.	Pos.	Nation	Player

Out:

No.	Pos.	Nation	Player
4	MF	SEN	Ismaïla N'Diaye (to (Belgium) Cercle Brugge)
5	MF	FRA	Alassane També (on loan to (Belgium) Antwerp)
22	MF	FRA	Jimmy Kamghain (on loan to (Belgium) Roeselare)
29	DF	FRA	Romain Reynaud (on loan to (Belgium) OH Leuven)

=== Lierse ===
In:

No.	Pos.	Nation	Player
—	DF	EGY	Louay Badr (from (Belgium) Turnhout)
—	FW	SEN	Mbaye Diagne (on loan from (Italy) Juventus)
—	MF	BEL	Anthony Limbombe (on loan from (Belgium) Genk)

Out:

No.	Pos.	Nation	Player
5	FW	BRA	Bruno (on loan to (Belgium) Dessel Sport)
7	FW	EGY	Ahmed Yasser (on loan to (Egypt) Wadi Degla)
21	MF	BEL	Benjamin Lambot (to (Azerbaijan) Simurq)
23	MF	EGY	Ahmed Samir Farag (released)
—	GK	BEL	Matz Sels (to (Belgium) Gent)

=== Lokeren ===
In:

No.	Pos.	Nation	Player
4	DF	BEL	Gregory Mertens (from (Belgium) Cercle Brugge)
11	MF	BEL	Onur Kaya (from (Belgium) Charleroi)

Out:

No.	Pos.	Nation	Player
4	DF	FRA	Jérémy Taravel (to (Croatia) Dinamo Zagreb)
28	MF	BEL	Enes Sağlık (to (Belgium) Charleroi)

=== Mechelen ===
In:

No.	Pos.	Nation	Player
—	DF	SRB	Miloš Kosanović (from (Poland) Cracovia)
—	MF	BEL	Jonathan Legear (from (Russia) Terek Grozny)
—	MF	BEL	Lamisha Musonda (from (England) Chelsea)

Out:

No.	Pos.	Nation	Player
31	MF	BEL	Wannes Van Tricht (on loan to (Belgium) ASV Geel)
—	MF	BEL	Gilles Sallaets (on loan to (Belgium) Rupel Boom)

=== Mons ===
In:

No.	Pos.	Nation	Player
—	FW	SWE	Pär Ericsson (from (Sweden) Göteborg)
—	MF	COD	Zola Matumona (from (Angola) Primeiro do Agosto)

Out:

No.	Pos.	Nation	Player
9	FW	CMR	Steve Beleck (loan return to (Italy) Udinese)

=== OH Leuven ===
In:

No.	Pos.	Nation	Player
12	FW	GAM	Ibou (loan return from (Qatar) Muaither)
14	MF	BEL	Jordy Croux (on loan from (Belgium) Genk)
16	DF	FRA	Romain Reynaud (on loan from (Belgium) Kortrijk)
19	MF	BEL	Lukas Van Eenoo (on loan from (Belgium) Cercle Brugge)

Out:

No.	Pos.	Nation	Player
12	FW	BEL	Marvin Ogunjimi (loan return to (Spain) Mallorca)
14	FW	BEL	Thomas Azevedo (on loan to (Netherlands) Go Ahead Eagles)
16	MF	BEL	Cédric Buekers (on loan to (Belgium) Heist)
27	MF	ISL	Stefán Gíslason (to (Iceland) Breiðablik)
28	DF	GUI	Zainoul Haidara (released)

=== Oostende ===
In:

No.	Pos.	Nation	Player
15	MF	RSA	Andile Jali (from (South Africa) Orlando Pirates)
—	MF	ESP	Fede Vico (on loan from (Belgium) Anderlecht)

Out:

No.	Pos.	Nation	Player
1	GK	COD	Mulopo Kudimbana (on loan to (Belgium) Anderlecht)
16	MF	BEL	Yohan Brouckaert (to (Belgium) Mouscron-Péruwelz)
20	FW	BEL	Wouter Moreels (on loan to (Belgium) Deinze)
28	MF	HUN	Ádám Vass (released)

=== Standard Liège ===
In:

No.	Pos.	Nation	Player
—	FW	COD	Jean-Marc Makusu Mundele (from (Democratic Republic of the Congo) Bel'Or)

Out:

No.	Pos.	Nation	Player
5	DF	ITA	Alessandro Iandoli (loan return to (Belgium) Sint-Truiden)
7	FW	IRN	Reza Ghoochannejhad (to (England) Charlton Athletic)
18	GK	BEL	Anthony Moris (on loan to (Belgium) Sint-Truiden)
20	FW	ISR	Dudu Biton (on loan to (Spain) Alcorcón)
30	GK	FRA	Yohann Thuram-Ulien (on loan to (England) Charlton Athletic)
75	DF	TUR	Alpaslan Öztürk (on loan to (Turkey) Kasımpaşa)
—	MF	SWE	Astrit Ajdarević (on loan to (England) Charlton Athletic)
—	GK	BEL	Laurent Henkinet (on loan to (Belgium) Dessel Sport)
—	MF	TUR	Anıl Koç (on loan to (England) Charlton Athletic)
—	MF	MNE	Nebojša Kosović (signed from (Serbia) Vojvodina, then loaned to (Hungary) Újpest)
—	MF	URU	Guillermo Méndez (was on loan to (Belgium) Sint-Truiden, now loaned to (Spain) Alcorcón)
—	MF	BEL	Georgiy Zhukov (on loan to (Kazakhstan) Astana)

=== Waasland-Beveren ===
In:

No.	Pos.	Nation	Player
20	MF	NGA	Reuben Gabriel (from (Scotland) Kilmarnock)

Out:

No.	Pos.	Nation	Player

=== Zulte Waregem ===
In:

No.	Pos.	Nation	Player
7	FW	CMR	Fabrice Olinga (on loan from (Spain) Málaga)
12	FW	GER	Marvin Pourié (on loan from (Denmark) Copenhagen)
33	MF	CIV	Bobley Anderson (on loan from (Spain) Málaga)
43	DF	PAN	Roberto Chen (on loan from (Spain) Málaga)

Out:

No.	Pos.	Nation	Player
7	FW	CTA	Habib Habibou (to (Belgium) Gent)
25	GK	BEL	Salvatore Crimi (on loan to (Belgium) Charleroi)
28	MF	BEL	Junior Malanda (loan return to (Germany) VfL Wolfsburg)
30	MF	BEL	Tjakke Stevens (on loan to (Belgium) Torhout)
