= 2014–15 Belgian Cup =

Tournament details
- Country: Belgium
- Dates: 26 July 2014 – 22 March 2015
- Teams: 293

Final positions
- Champions: Club Brugge (11th title)
- Runners-up: Anderlecht

The 2014–15 Belgian Cup is the 60th season of Belgian's annual football cup competition. The competition began on 26 July 2014 and ended with the final on 22 March 2015. The winners of the competition will qualify for the 2015–16 UEFA Europa League play-off round. Lokeren are the defending champions.

== Competition format ==
The competition consists of ten rounds. The first seven rounds are held as single-match elimination rounds. When tied after 90 minutes in the first three rounds, penalties are taken immediately. In rounds four to seven, when tied after 90 minutes first an extra time period of 30 minutes are played, then penalties are taken if still necessary. The quarter- and semifinals will be played over two legs, where the team winning on aggregate advances. The final will be played as a single match.

Teams enter the competition in different rounds, based upon their 2014–15 league affiliation. Teams from the fourth-level Promotion or lower began in Round 1. Third Division teams entered in Round 3, with Second Division teams joining in the following round. Teams from the Belgian First Division enter in Round 6.

Round	Clubs remaining	Clubs involved	Winners from previous round	New entries this round	Leagues entering at this round
Round 1	293	223	none	223	Levels 4 to 8 in football league pyramid
Round 2	182	112	111 (+1 bye)	none	none
Round 3	126	92	56	36	Belgian Third Division
Round 4	80	64	46	18	Belgian Second Division
Round 5	48	32	32	none	none
Round 6	32	32	16	16	Belgian Pro League
Round 7	16	16	16	none	none
Quarter-Finals	8	8	8	none	none
Semi-Finals	4	4	4	none	none
Final	2	2	2	none	none

== First round ==
These round of matches were played on 26 & 27 July 2014.

Tie no	Home team (tier)	Score	Away team (tier)
1.	KSV White Star Adinkerke (5)	3–0	VC.K.Zwevegem Sport (5)
2.	VV.Westkapelle (5)	1–0	K.Eendracht Wervik (5)
3.	SK.Nieuwkerke (7)	1–3	OMS.Ingelmunster (4)
4.	K.VV.Oostduinkerke (5)	1–3	K.Sassport Boezinge (4)
5.	K.SC.Wielsbeke (5)	2–2 (9-8p)	K.Racing Waregem (4)
6.	VV.Eendracht Brugge (6)	1–6	Sporting West Harelbeke (4)
7.	AC.Estaimbourg A (6)	0–3	VK.Westhoek (4)
8.	R.AS.Pays Blanc Antoinien (6)	1–1 (2–3p)	K.SK.Oostnieuwkerke (5)
9.	K.FC.Meulebeke (5)	2–1	FC.Helkijn (5)
10.	Racing Club Lauwe (6)	0–4	K.SV.De Ruiter Roeselare (5)
11.	K.FC.Langemark (5)	1–2	K.VC.Wingene (5)
12.	K.SV.Rumbeke (5)	2–1	K.SK.Vlamertinge (5)
13.	S.C. Toekomst Menen (4)	15–1	R.FC.Molenbaix A (7)
14.	R.Knokke FC. (4)	4–0	Peruwelz Football Club A (5)
15.	SK.Eernegem (4)	7–1	AC.Anvaing A (6)
16.	Olympic de Warcoing (6)	BYE	---
17.	K.FC.Sparta Petegem (4)	4–1	Willen Is Kunnen Eine (5)
18.	K.FC.Gavere-Asper (6)	0–2	K.VC.Jong Lede (4)
19.	K.FC.Jong VL.Kruibeke (5)	2–4	K.FC.Sp.St-Gillis Waas (4)
20.	R.RC.Wetteren-Kwatrecht (4)	6–0	K.Voetbalclub Sint-Gillis (7)
21.	K.SK.Klinge (6)	0–4	K.SK.Ronse (4)
22.	SC.Dikkelvenne (5)	3–6	SK.Berlare (4)
23.	VC.Nazareth-Eke (7)	1–6	K.Standaard Wetteren (4)
24.	K.E.Appelterre-Eichem (5)	1–3	Sportkring Sint-Niklaas (4)
25.	VK.Z.Hamme-Zogge (7)	0–2	K.SK.De Jeugd Lovendegem (5)
26.	Thor Kokerij-Meldert (5)	2–2 (4–3p)	K.VV.Laarne-Kalken (5)
27.	VV.Sparta Ursel (6)	0–1	Rapide Club Lebbeke (5)
28.	K.FC.Merelbeke (6)	2–1	R.ES.Acrenoise (4)
29.	K.VK.Svelta Melsele (5)	1–2	K.VK.Ninove (5)
30.	K.VV.Zelzate (5)	4–2	SK.Lochristi (6)
31.	K.FC.Herenthout (6)	0–3	K.FC.Duffel (4)
32.	K.Wuustwezel FC. (5)	0–4	FCO Beerschot Wilrijk (4)
33.	K.Antonia FC. (5)	0–1	K.Lyra TSV. (4)
34.	K.FC.Zwarte Leeuw (4)	7–0	SV.Grasheide (8)
35.	K.FC.St.-Lenaarts (4)	6–0	VC.Poederlee (8)
36.	Sp.Tisselt (7)	3–1	FC.Berlaar-Heikant (5)
37.	K.VV.Vosselaar (4)	3–3 (4–2p)	FC.Mariekerke (5)
38.	K.Sint-Job FC. (5)	0–1	VC.Herentals (4)
39.	K.Puurs Excelsior R.SK. (7)	0–1	K.FC.Schoten SK. (7)
40.	Zwart Wit Eendr.Kessel (7)	2–2 (5–4p)	K.FC.De Kempen T.L. (5)
41.	K.Retie SK. (6)	1–3	Merksem-Antw. Noord SC. (4)
42.	K.Schelle Sport (7)	0–6	K.Ternesse VV.Wommelgem (5)
43.	K.Witgoor Sport Dessel (4)	2–2 (3–4p)	FC.Turnhout (5)
44.	Horendonk FC. (7)	3–2	FC.Gierle (7)
45.	Sporting Bruxelles (6)	2–3	Crossing Schaerbeek (5)
46.	R.Un.Auderghem (7)	0–6	K.Wolvertem SC. (4)
47.	FC.Borght (6)	2–0	K.HO.Huizingen (7)
48.	US.Rebecquoise (4)	5–0	FC.Perk (7)
49.	K.OVC.Sterrebeek (4)	1–2	SK.Leeuw (6)
50.	Union Lovenjoel (5)	2–0	ASE.De Chastre (7)
51.	K.AC.Betekom (5)	0–2	Tempo Overijse (4)
52.	R.Jeun.Aischoise (5)	0–3	SK.Terjoden-Welle (4)
53.	FC Ganshoren (4)	0–1	R.FC.Grand-Leez (5)
54.	FC.Pepingen (4)	2–0	Crossing Vissenaken (6)
55.	K.FC.Baal (7)	0–0 (4–2p)	Léopold Uccle-Woluwé FC. (4)
56.	R.Union Rixensartoise (6)	2–0	VC.Eendr.Mazenzele (7)

Tie no	Home team (tier)	Score	Away team (tier)
57.	R.FC.Meux (4)	5–1	FC.St-Jozef Londerzeel (7)
58.	K.Olympia SC.Wijgmaal (4)	5–0	Black Star FC. (6)
59.	Stade Everois Racing Club (7)	2–2 (3–4p)	K.Stade Bierbeek (5)
60.	SK.Kampelaar (6)	0–2	R.Racing Club de Waterloo (4)
61.	Sp.Espoir Jemeppe (5)	1–13	Union Royale Namur (4)
62.	SC.Montignies (6)	2–0	FC.Flénu (6)
63.	R.Chatelet SC. (4)	2–1	R.FC.Spy (5)
64.	Racing FC.Fosses (5)	5–1	R.Exc.Cl.Beaumontois (6)
65.	R.UFC.Ransartoise (5)	2–0	R.Arquet FC. (5)
66.	ARS.de l'Entité Floreffe (7)	1–7	Charleroi Fleurus (4)
67.	R.Gosselies Sports (5)	0–0 (4–5p)	JS.Taminoise (4)
68.	Pont-A Celles-Buzet (6)	2–4	R.ES.Couvin-Mariembourg (4)
69.	U.St-Ghisl.Tertre-Hautr. (5)	1–0	CS.Onhaye (4)
70.	CS.Entité Manageoise (5)	1–2	R.US.Beloeil (6)
71.	US.Solrezienne (4)	2–1	US.Beauraing (5)
72.	Standard Flawinne FC. (6)	0–2	RJ Entente Binchoise (4)
73.	FC.Ligny (5)	0–0 (3–1p)	R.US.De Grand Reng (6)
74.	R.FC.Rhisnois (6)	2–1	Union Entité Estinnoise (6)
75.	K.Herk-De-Stad FC. (5)	1–2	K.Zonhoven VV. (5)
76.	K.Lutlommel VV. (5)	4–0	K.VK.Wellen (4)
77.	Real Neeroeteren-Maaseik (6)	0–4	F.C. Esperanza Pelt (4)
78.	FC.Helson Helchteren (5)	2–1	VV.Brustem Centrum (6)
79.	K.ESK.Leopoldsburg (4)	0–0 (3–4p)	RC.Reppel (6)
80.	K.SK.Bree (4)	1–2	FC.Melosport Zonhoven (6)
81.	FC.Apollo 74 Gellik (5)	1–1 (0–3p)	K.Vlijtingen VV. (5)
82.	Lindelhoeven VV. (5)	0–4	Spouwen-Mopertingen (4)
83.	VV.Nieuwerkerken (6)	0–4	VV.Thes Sport Tessenderlo (5)
84.	K.VV.Lummen (8)	0–5	K.VK.Beringen (5)
85.	Bilzerse Waltwilder VV. (4)	3–1	K.FC.M.D.Halen (6)
86.	Eendracht Termien (5)	0–5	RC.Hades (4)
87.	ET.Elsautoise (6)	1–5	Patro Lensois (5)
88.	Seraing Athletique R.FC. (6)	4–0	E.S.Wanze/Bas-Oha (6)
89.	Stade Disonais (5)	4–3	R.CS.Pol. Retinne (8)
90.	R.Stade Waremmien FC. (4)	3–0	J.S.Fizoise (6)
91.	FC.UNITED RICHELLE (5)	5–0	R.FC.Hannutois (6)
92.	R.Standard Club Oheytois (6)	0–2	FC.Herstal (5)
93.	R.FC.Huy (4)	3–0	R.CS.Condruzien (5)
94.	R.S.C.Beaufays (5)	1–0	R.Ent.Racing Club Amay (5)
95.	F.C. Tilleur (4)	3–0	R.US.Assesse (4)
96.	R.Cornesse FC. (7)	0–7	R.RC.Hamoir (4)
97.	R.FC.de Liège (4)	3–0	R.Union Momalloise (7)
98.	R.Stade Waremmien FC II (6)	0–0 (5–3p)	Solières Sport (4)
99.	R.Aywaille FC. (4)	4–3	R.RC.Stockay-Warfusée (6)
100.	SK.Moelingen (5)	1–5	R.FC. 1912 Raeren (5)
101.	R.OC.Rochois (5)	7–0	R.ES.Aubange (6)
102.	R.US.Leglise (7)	2–4	R.SC.Nassogne (6)
103.	R.All.FC.Oppagne-Wéris (5)	1–2	Wallonia Club Sibret (7)
104.	FC.Eprave (7)	0–0 (5–3p)	FC.Paliseulois (6)
105.	R.Exc.De Fouches (6)	1–5	R.US.Ethe Belmont (5)
106.	R.LC.Bastogne (5)	0–2	J.Rochefortoise Jemelle (5)
107.	R.ES.Champlonaise (5)	3–1	R.ES.Vaux (5)
108.	R.RC.Longlier (5)	3–0	R.Standard FC.Bièvre (5)
109.	R.US.Givry (4)	8–0	R.Jeunesse Freylangeoise (6)
110.	R.US.Sartoise (6)	1–8	R.Ent.Bertrigeoise (4)
111.	FC.Jeun.Lorr.Arlonaise (4)	2–1	ES.Wellinoise (6)
112.	R.RC.Mormont (4)	3–0	R.OC.Meix-Dt-Virton (5)

== Second round ==
These round of matches were played on 2 & 3 August 2014.

Tie no	Home team (tier)	Score	Away team (tier)
1.	R.RC.Hamoir (4)	2–1	F.C. Tilleur (4)
2.	VC.Herentals (4)s	1–0	Horendonk FC. (7)
3.	FC.Turnhout (5)	1–2	K.VV.Vosselaar (4)
4.	K.FC.Meulebeke (5)	0–2	Sporting West Harelbeke (4)
5.	Merksem-Antw. Noord SC. (4)	6–0	Zwart Wit Eendr.Kessel (7)
6.	VV.Thes Sport Tessenderlo (5)	0–3	F.C. Esperanza Pelt (4)
7.	Rapide Club Lebbeke (5)	0–3	K.SK.Ronse (4)
8.	RC.Hades (4)	3–0	Bilzerse Waltwilder VV. (4)
9.	SK.Terjoden-Welle (4)	1–1 (4–5p)	R.FC.Grand-Leez (5)
10.	R.ES.Couvin-Mariembourg (4)	5–0	Racing FC.Fosses (5)
11.	K.VK.Beringen (5)	2–1	RC.Reppel (6)
12.	R.Ent.Bertrigeoise (4)	2–1	R.RC.Longlier (5)
13.	R.US.Ethe Belmont (5)	1–0	FC.Jeun.Lorr.Arlonaise (4)
14.	R.Stade Waremmien FC. (4)	3–6	R.S.C.Beaufays (5)
15.	VK.Westhoek (4)	3–0	VV.Westkapelle (5)
16.	OMS.Ingelmunster (4)	2–0	K.SC.Wielsbeke (5)
17.	K.SV.De Ruiter Roeselare (5)	3–1	K.VC.Wingene (5)
18.	K.Sassport Boezinge (4)	0–0 (3–5p)	KSV White Star Adinkerke (5)
19.	S.C. Toekomst Menen (4)	1–1 (3–4p)	SK.Eernegem (4)
20.	R.Knokke FC. (4)	3–0	K.SK.Oostnieuwkerke (5)
21.	SK.Berlare (4)	1–3	Sportkring Sint-Niklaas (4)
22.	K.VK.Ninove (5)	0–4	K.FC.Sparta Petegem (4)
23.	K.FC.Sp.St-Gillis Waas (4)	1–1 (5–3p)	K.VV.Zelzate (5)
24.	R.RC.Wetteren-Kwatrecht (4)	1–0	K.VC.Jong Lede (4)
25.	K.Standaard Wetteren (4)	8–1	Thor Kokerij-Meldert (5)
26.	Sp.Tisselt (7)	0–7	K.FC.Duffel (4)
27.	K.Lyra TSV. (4)	1–3	FCO Beerschot Wilrijk (4)
28.	K.Ternesse VV.Wommelgem (5)	1–5	K.FC.St.-Lenaarts (4)

Tie no	Home team (tier)	Score	Away team (tier)
29.	K.FC.Schoten SK. (7)	0–5	K.FC.Zwarte Leeuw (4)
30.	Olympic de Warcoing (6)	1–2	K.SV.Rumbeke (5)
31.	K.Stade Bierbeek (5)	1–1 (1–4p)	FC.Borght (6)
32.	Crossing Schaerbeek (5)	4–0	K.FC.Baal (7)
33.	Tempo Overijse (4)	6–0	SK.Leeuw (6)
34.	US.Rebecquoise (4)	5–0	Union Lovenjoel (5)
35.	K.Wolvertem SC. (4)	1–0	R.Union Rixensartoise (6)
36.	R.FC.Meux (4)	7–2	FC.Pepingen (4)
37.	R.Racing Club de Waterloo (4)	1–1 (4–1p)	K.Olympia SC.Wijgmaal (4)
38.	U.St-Ghisl.Tertre-Hautr. (5)	0–2	Charleroi Fleurus (4)
39.	R.US.Beloeil (6)	0–2	JS.Taminoise (4)
40.	R.UFC.Ransartoise (5)	4–0	FC.Ligny (5)
41.	US.Solrezienne (4)	1–1 (3–4p)	Union Royale Namur (4)
42.	SC.Montignies (6)	3–3 (2–4p)	RJ Entente Binchoise (4)
43.	R.FC.Rhisnois (6)	0–3	R.Chatelet SC. (4)
44.	Spouwen-Mopertingen (4)	1–1 (4–2p)	FC.Helson Helchteren (5)
45.	FC.Melosport Zonhoven (6)	2–1	K.Lutlommel VV. (5)
46.	FC.Herstal (5)	0–1	Stade Disonais (5)
47.	Seraing Athletique R.FC. (6)	0–2	R.FC.de Liège (4)
48.	R.FC. 1912 Raeren (5)	0–3	R.FC.Huy (4)
49.	Patro Lensois (5)	3–1	FC.UNITED RICHELLE (5)
50.	Wallonia Club Sibret (7)	2–4	R.RC.Mormont (4)
51.	R.OC.Rochois (5)	1–3	R.ES.Champlonaise (5)
52.	R.US.Givry (4)	5–0	R.SC.Nassogne (6)
53.	FC.Eprave (7)	0–4	J.Rochefortoise Jemelle (5)
54.	K.FC.Merelbeke (6)	4–4 (5–2p)	K.SK.De Jeugd Lovendegem (5)
55.	K.Zonhoven VV. (5)	3–1	K.Vlijtingen VV. (5)
56.	R.Stade Waremmien FC II (6)	1–6	R.Aywaille FC. (4)

== Third round ==
These round of matches were played on 9,10,13 & 14 August 2014.

Tie no	Home team (tier)	Score	Away team (tier)
1.	RC.Hades (4)	0–2	R.Sprimont Comblain Sport (3)
2.	Torhout 1992 km. (3)	2–1	R.Aywaille FC. (4)
3.	Stade Disonais (5)	0–2	K.SV.Temse (3)
4.	R.S.C.Beaufays (5)	0–4	R.W.Walhain CG. (3)
5.	K.FC.Sparta Petegem (4)	1–2	C.S. Visé (3)
6.	K.SV.Rumbeke (5)	0–5	K. Rupel Boom F.C. (3)
7.	K.FC.Duffel (4)	3–5	UR La Louvière Centre (3)
8.	R.RC.Hamoir (4)	1–2	R.FC.Un.La Calamine (3)
9.	K.FC.St.-Lenaarts (4)	3–0	K.SC.Grimbergen (3)
10.	Merksem-Antw. Noord SC. (4)	6–2	K.V. Turnhout (3)
11.	K.FC.Zwarte Leeuw (4)	2–1	K.F.C. Vigor Wuitens Hamme (3)
12.	F.C. Esperanza Pelt (4)	0–0 (6-5p)	KFC.Oosterzonen Oosterw. (3)
13.	K.FC.Merelbeke (6)	0–4	R.Geants Athois (3)
14.	K.SV.De Ruiter Roeselare (5)	0–1	K.Bocholter VV. (3)
15.	K.VK.Beringen (5)	1–5	K.Sint-Eloois-Winkel Sp. (3)
16.	R.Ent.Bertrigeoise (4)	0–0 (5–6p)	Royale Union Saint-Gilloise (3)
17.	R.US.Givry (4)	1–0	FC.V.Dender E.H. (3)
18.	FC.Melosport Zonhoven (6)	2–6	R.U.Wallonne Ciney (3)
19.	K.M.S.K. Deinze (3)	7–1	K.Zonhoven VV. (5)
20.	K.V.K. Tienen (3)	2–0	SK.Eernegem (4)
21.	R.US.Ethe Belmont (5)	2–0	K. Londerzeel S.K. (3)
22.	K. SK Ronse (4)	1–1 (4–2p)	R. Cappellen F.C. (3)
23.	K.S.V. Oudenaarde (3)	5–0	R.RC.Wetteren-Kwatrecht (4)

Tie no	Home team (tier)	Score	Away team (tier)
24.	FCO Beerschot Wilrijk (4)	2–1	Sportkring Sint-Niklaas (4)
25.	K.Standaard Wetteren (4)	0–4	K.SV.Bornem (3)
26.	K.S.C. Hasselt (3)	3–0	R.Chatelet SC. (4)
27.	FC Gullegem (3)	1–1 (2–4p)	Union Royale Namur (4)
28.	RJ Entente Binchoise (4)	1–0	R.F.C. Tournai (3)
29.	R.UFC.Ransartoise (5)	2–6	K. Berchem Sport (3)
30.	K.FC.Izegem (3)	0–0 (2–4p)	OMS.Ingelmunster (4)
31.	R.ES.Champlonaise (5)	1–4	K.F.C. Eendracht Zele (3)
32.	K. Diegem Sport (3)	0–0 (2–4p)	Tempo Overijse (4)
33.	K.VV.Coxyde (3)	6–1	KSV White Star Adinkerke (5)
34.	R.Knokke FC. (4)	10–0	J.Rochefortoise Jemelle (5)
35.	K.Olsa Brakel (3)	8–1	R.ES.Couvin-Mariembourg (4)
36.	Spouwen-Mopertingen (4)	1–2	Hoogstraten VV (3)
37.	R.FC. 1912 Raeren (5)	1–1 (3–5p)	K.FC.Sp.St-Gillis Waas (4)
38.	R.C.S. Verviétois (3)	1–2	Charleroi Fleurus (4)
39.	K.R.C. Gent-Zeehaven (3)	2–0	Crossing Schaerbeek (5)
40.	K.VV.Vosselaar (4)	2–2 (4–3p)	FC.Borght (6)
41.	JS.Taminoise (4)	3–2	R.FC.de Liège (4)
42.	VC.Herentals (4)	1–4	R.Racing Club de Waterloo (4)
43.	R.RC.Mormont (4)	0–2	US.Rebecquoise (4)
44.	Sporting West Harelbeke (4)	0–0 (9–8p)	R.FC.Meux (4)
45.	K.Wolvertem SC. (4)	1–1 (1–2p)	Patro Lensois (5)
46.	R.FC.Grand-Leez (5)	4–4 (5–6p)	VK.Westhoek (4)

== Fourth round ==
These round of matches were played on 16 & 17 August 2014.

Tie no	Home team (tier)	Score	Away team (tier)
1.	K.FC.St.-Lenaarts (4)	1–4	R.A.E.C. Mons (2)
2.	R.FC.Un.La Calamine (3)	3–4 (a.e.t.)	K. SK Ronse (4)
3.	Lommel United (2)	1–0	Merksem-Antw. Noord SC. (4)
4.	K.A.S. Eupen (2)	1–0	Charleroi Fleurus (4)
5.	K.R.C. Gent-Zeehaven (3)	2–4	FCO Beerschot Wilrijk (4)
6.	Tempo Overijse (4)	1–2 (a.e.t.)	Royal Antwerp F.C. (2)
7.	Patro Lensois (5)	1–4	Union Royale Namur (4)
8.	OMS.Ingelmunster (4)	2–3 (a.e.t.)	R.W.Walhain CG (3).
9.	Torhout 1992 km. (3)	1–0	C.S. Visé (3)
10.	K.VV.Coxyde (3)	5–2	K.SV.Temse (3)
11.	F.C. Esperanza Pelt (4)	1–2 (a.e.t.)	K. Patro Eisden Maasmechelen (2)
12.	Oud-Heverlee Leuven (2)	1–0	K.Bocholter VV. (3)
13.	K.Sint-Eloois-Winkel Sp. (3)	2–0	K.F.C. Eendracht Zele (3)
14.	K.FC.Sp.St-Gillis Waas (4)	2–1	K.FC.Zwarte Leeuw (4)
15.	VK.Westhoek (4)	1–2	K.S.V. Oudenaarde (3)
16.	K.V. Woluwe-Zaventem (2)	5–3	K. Rupel Boom F.C. (3)

Tie no	Home team (tier)	Score	Away team (tier)
17.	K.S.V. Roeselare (2)	1–0	US.Rebecquoise (4)
18.	K.VV.Vosselaar (4)	1–2	SC Eendracht Aalst (2)
19.	R.Racing Club de Waterloo (4)	2–0	R.E. Virton (2)
20.	Hoogstraten VV (3)	1–2	R.Geants Athois (3)
21.	K. Sint-Truidense V.V. (2)	3–2 (a.e.t.)	K.M.S.K. Deinze (3)
22.	K.R.C. Mechelen (2)	5–0	R.US.Ethe Belmont (5)
23.	R.US.Givry (4)	2–4	R. White Star Bruxelles (2)
24.	RJ Entente Binchoise (4)	1–4	K.S.K. Heist (2)
25.	R.U.Wallonne Ciney (3)	0–0 (3–5 p)	A.F.C. Tubize (2)
26.	R.Sprimont Comblain Sport (3)	0–3	K.F.C. Dessel Sport (2)
27.	Sporting West Harelbeke (4)	2–4 (a.e.t.)	JS.Taminoise (4)
28.	Royale Union Saint-Gilloise (3)	0–1	Seraing United (2)
29.	K.SV.Bornem (3)	3–2	K. Berchem Sport (3)
30.	K.V.K. Tienen (3)	1–3	AS Verbroedering Geel (2)
31.	UR La Louvière Centre (3)	0–2	K Olsa Brakel (3)
32.	R.Knokke FC. (4)	0–1	K.S.C. Hasselt (3)

== Fifth round ==
These round of matches were played on 23,24 & 26 August 2014.

Tie no	Home team (tier)	Score	Away team (tier)
1.	K.FC.Sp.St-Gillis Waas (4)	2–1	K.S.V. Oudenaarde (3)
2.	K.SV.Bornem (3)	1–4	Oud-Heverlee Leuven (2)
3.	Lommel United (2)	2–0	R.A.E.C. Mons (2)
4.	K.R.C. Mechelen (2)	2–0	R. White Star Bruxelles (2)
5.	AS Verbroedering Geel (2)	1–2	K Olsa Brakel (3)
6.	K.F.C. Dessel Sport (2)	3–0	A.F.C. Tubize (2)
7.	R.Geants Athois (3)	0–2	K. Sint-Truidense V.V. (2)
8.	K.S.C. Hasselt (3)	0–1	K. Patro Eisden Maasmechelen (2)

Tie no	Home team (tier)	Score	Away team (tier)
9.	K.V. Woluwe-Zaventem (2)	2–1	K.S.V. Roeselare (2)
10.	K. SK Ronse (4)	2–3	K.Sint-Eloois-Winkel Sp. (3)
11.	Union Royale Namur (4)	3–0	JS.Taminoise (4)
12.	K.S.K. Heist (2)	2–2 (5–4 p)	FCO Beerschot Wilrijk (4)
13.	R.W.Walhain CG (3)	0–1	K.A.S. Eupen (2)
14.	K.VV.Coxyde (3)	4–0	Torhout 1992 km. (3)
15.	Royal Antwerp F.C. (2)	3–1	Seraing United (2)
16.	SC Eendracht Aalst (2)	2–1	R.Racing Club de Waterloo (4)

== Sixth round ==
These round of matches were played on 24 September 2014.

Tie no	Home team (tier)	Score	Away team (tier)
1.	KSC Lokeren (1)	6–0	K.Sint-Eloois-Winkel Sp. (3)
2.	K.VV.Coxyde (3)	0–0 (a.e.t.) (4–3 p)	Royal Mouscron-Peruwelz (1)
3.	K Olsa Brakel (3)	6–1	KVC Westerlo (1)
4.	Racing Genk (1)	0–1	K.R.C. Mechelen (2)
5.	K.FC.Sp.St-Gillis Waas (4)	1–7	Cercle Brugge (1)
6.	K.F.C. Dessel Sport (2)	0–2	KV Mechelen (1)
7.	SC Eendracht Aalst (2)	1–6	Club Brugge (1)
8.	K.S.K. Heist (2)	0–3	Standard Liège (1)
9.	Lierse SK (1)	4–0	K. Sint-Truidense V.V. (2)
10.	Lommel United (2)	2–1	Waasland-Beveren (1)
11.	Oud-Heverlee Leuven (2)	1–3	KV Kortrijk (1)
12.	K. Patro Eisden Maasmechelen (2)	3–5 (a.e.t.)	Anderlecht (1)
13.	Sporting Charleroi (1)	2–0	K.A.S. Eupen (2)
14.	Union Royale Namur (4)	1–3	KAA Gent (1)
15.	K.V. Woluwe-Zaventem (2)	1–3	KV Oostende (1)
16.	Royal Antwerp F.C. (2)	0–4	Zulte Waregem (1)

== Seventh round ==
The matches took place on 2 and 3 December 2014.

2 December 2014	Cercle Brugge (1)	3–0 (a.e.t.)	Coxyde (3)	Bruges
20:00	Bourdin 105+1'; D'haene 107'; Maertens 116'	Report		Stadium: Jan Breydel Stadium; Referee: Denis Vanbecelaere

3 December 2014	Charleroi (1)	2–0	Oostende (1)	Charleroi
20:00	Kebano 34' (pen.); Fauré 57'	Report		Stadium: Stade du Pays de Charleroi; Referee: Jonathan Lardot

3 December 2014	Kortrijk (1)	0–3	Club Brugge (1)	Kortrijk
20:00		Report	Vázquez 52'; Gedoz 77'; Refaelov 90+4'	Stadium: Guldensporen Stadion; Referee: Alexandre Boucaut

3 December 2014	Zulte Waregem (1)	2–1 (a.e.t.)	Lierse (1)	Waregem
20:00	Aneke 4'; Sylla 109'	Report	Bourabia 39'	Stadium: Regenboogstadion; Referee: Luc Wouters

3 December 2014	Olsa Brakel (3)	2–3	KV Mechelen (1)	Brakel
20:30	Lepage 4'; Haezebroeck 44'	Report	Adesanya 7'; Vanlerberghe 9'; Claes 24'	Stadium: Terrein Parkweg; Referee: Wim Smet

3 December 2014	Lommel United (2)	0–1	Gent (1)	Lommel
20:30		Report	Lepoint 61'	Stadium: Soevereinstadion; Referee: Nicolas Laforge

3 December 2014	Standard Liège (1)	1–4	Lokeren (1)	Liège
20:30	Trebel 63'	Report	Junior Dutra 15'; Patosi 66'; Leye 78', 89'	Stadium: Stade Maurice Dufrasne; Referee: Serge Gumienny

3 December 2014	Anderlecht (1)	4–1	K.R.C. Mechelen (2)	Brussels
20:45	Cyriac 15'; Kabasele 25', 82'; Tielemans 34' (pen.)	Report	Brulmans 86'	Stadium: Constant Vanden Stock Stadium; Referee: Lawrence Visser

== Quarter-finals ==
The matches took place with the first legs on 17 December 2014 and the second legs on 21 January 2015.

=== First legs ===
17 December 2014	Charleroi	2–1	Cercle Brugge	Charleroi
20:00	Fauré 27', 30'	Report	Smolders 40'	Stadium: Stade du Pays de Charleroi; Attendance: 3,652; Referee: Christof Dierick

17 December 2014	Zulte Waregem	0–3	Anderlecht	Waregem
20:30		Report	Acheampong 74'; Praet 76'; Kljestan 87'	Stadium: Regenboogstadion; Referee: Bart Vertenten

17 December 2014	Lokeren	1–4	Gent	Lokeren
20:30	Marić 42' (pen.)	Report	Depoitre 4'; Milićević 50'; Sayef 69'; Raman 87'	Stadium: Daknamstadion; Attendance: 5,422; Referee: Sébastien Delferiere

17 December 2014	Mechelen	0–0	Club Brugge	Mechelen
20:30		Report		Stadium: Argosstadion; Referee: Jonathan Lardot

=== Second legs ===
20 January 2015	Club Brugge	3–2 (3–2 agg.)	Mechelen	Bruges
20:45	Oulare 25', 37'; Mechele 90+1'	Report	Bateau 18'; De Witte 32' (pen.)	Stadium: Jan Breydel Stadium; Referee: Serge Gumienny

21 January 2015	Anderlecht	4–2 (7–2 agg.)	Zulte Waregem	Brussels
20:00	Kljestan 26', 45'; Cyriac 41'; Leya Iseka 69'	Report	Trajkovski 76' (pen.); Benteke 86'	Stadium: Constant Vanden Stock Stadium; Referee: Frederik Geldhof

21 January 2015	Cercle Brugge	2–0 (3–2 agg.)	Charleroi	Bruges
20:30	Muzaqi 68'; Buyl 90+6'	Report		Stadium: Jan Breydel Stadium; Attendance: 1,200; Referee: Alexandre Boucaut

21 January 2015	Gent	1–0 (5–1 agg.)	Lokeren	Ghent
20:30	Dejaegere 63'	Report		Stadium: Ghelamco Arena; Attendance: 6,975; Referee: Wim Smet

== Semi-finals ==
=== First legs ===
The matches will take place with the first legs on 3 and 4 February 2015 and the second legs on 11 February 2015.

3 February 2015	Club Brugge	5–1	Cercle Brugge	Bruges
20:45	Gedoz 15'; De Sutter 50'; Vázquez 64'; Izquierdo 79'; Storm 89'	Report	Bačelić-Grgić 45+1'	Stadium: Jan Breydel Stadium; Referee: Joeri Van De Velde

4 February 2015	Gent	0–2	Anderlecht	Ghent
20:45		Report	Najar 33'; Vanden Borre 57'	Stadium: Ghelamco Arena; Attendance: 14,473; Referee: Luc Wouters

=== Second legs ===
11 February 2015	Cercle Brugge	2–3 (3–8 agg.)	Club Brugge	Bruges
20:45	Sukuta-Pasu 75'; Buyl 90'	Report	Bolingoli-Mbombo 45+1', 77'; De fauw 51'	Stadium: Jan Breydel Stadium; Attendance: 3,000; Referee: Christof Dierick

12 February 2015	Anderlecht	3–0 (5–0 agg.)	Gent	Brussels
20:45	Defour 13'; Mitrović 15'; Tielemans 58' (pen.)	Report		Stadium: Constant Vanden Stock Stadium; Referee: Joeri Van De Velde

== Final ==
The final took place on 22 March 2015 at the King Baudouin Stadium in Brussels.

22 March 2015
18:30 CET (Note: The match was scheduled to start at 18:00, but postponed with 30 minutes due to traffic jams around the stadium.)

Club Brugge	2–1	Anderlecht
De Sutter 12'; Refaelov 90+2'	Report	Mitrović 89'

King Baudouin Stadium, Brussels
Referee: Serge Gumienny
