= Jinty =

Jinty can refer to:

- Jinty (comics), a British comic published 1974–1981
- Jinty Caenepeel (born 1996), Belgian footballer
- Jinty Nelson (born 1942), British historian
- A nickname for the LMS Fowler Class 3F steam locomotive
  - Jinty, a Fowler 3F that appeared in one of The Railway Series books
