= Thomas Azevedo =

Belgian footballer

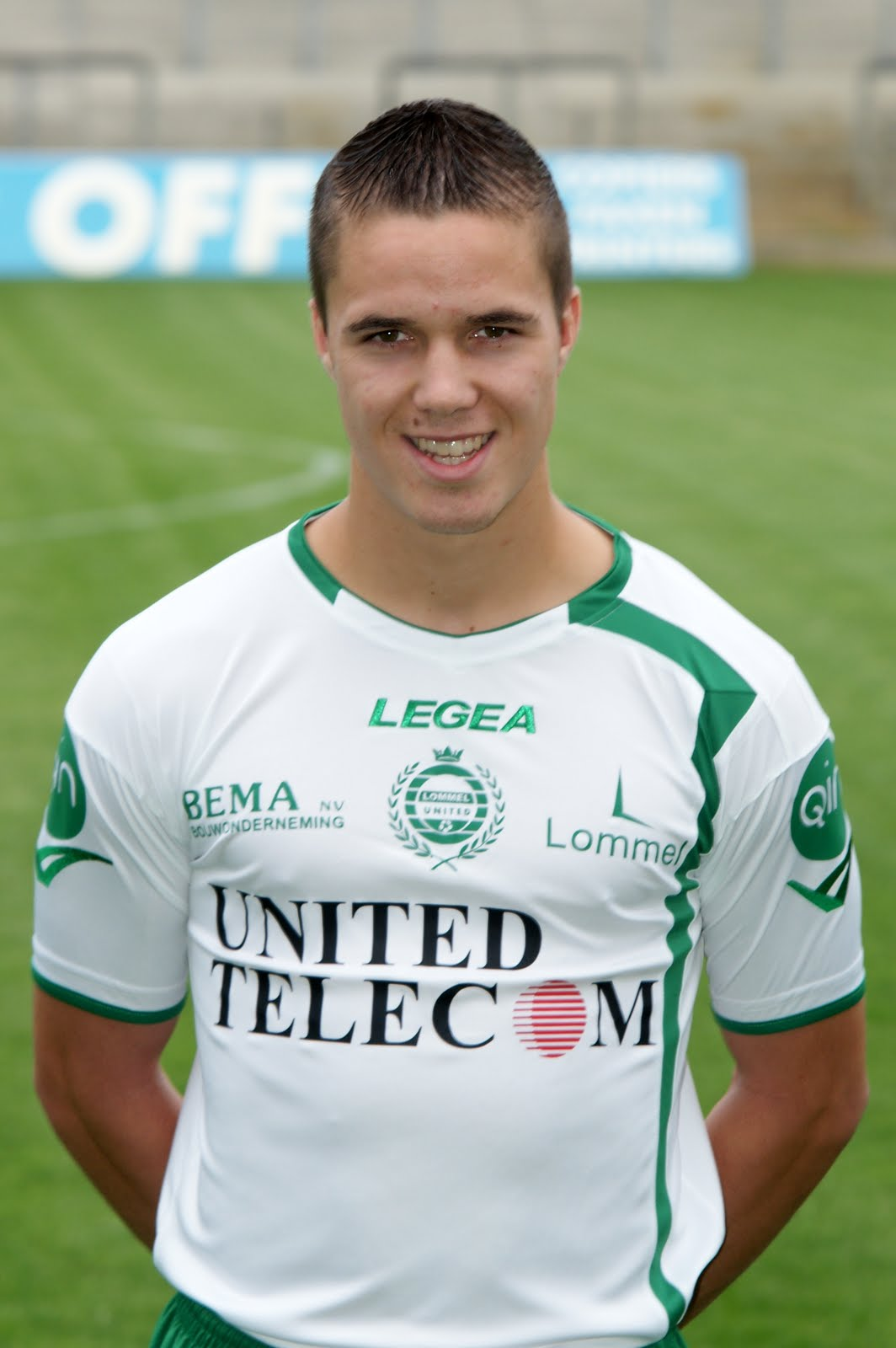
- Thomas Azevedo in 2010

Personal information
- Date of birth: 31 August 1991 (age 35)
- Place of birth: Peer, Belgium
- Height: 1.72 m (5 ft 7 1/2 in)
- Position: Winger

Team information
- Current team: Bocholt

Senior career*
Years	Team	Apps	(Gls)
2008–2011	Lommel United	65	(9)
2011–2018	OH Leuven	159	(18)
2014	→ Go Ahead Eagles (loan)	5	(0)
2018	→ Lommel (loan)	12	(0)
2018–2019	Lommel	27	(0)
2019–2021	Patro Eisden	18	(6)
2021–	Bocholt	0	(0)
- * Club domestic league appearances and goals as of 22:02, 23 January 2020 (UTC)

Thomas Azevedo Guimarâes (born 31 August 1991) is a Belgian professional footballer with Portuguese roots, who currently plays as a winger for Bocholt in the Belgian Division 2.

Before joining OH Leuven, Azevedo played with Lommel United until 2011. After the 2010-11 season, he was signed by newly promoted team OH Leuven. Part of the transfer sum was paid by Anderlecht, who thereby have the first option to sign Azevedo. On the last day of the winter 2013–14 transfer window, Azevedo moved on loan to Go Ahead Eagles.
