= Jinty Caenepeel =

Belgian footballer (born 1996)

Personal information
- Date of birth: 18 July 1996 (age 30)
- Place of birth: Ostend, Belgium
- Height: 1.75 m (5 ft 9 in)
- Position: Right winger

Youth career
- 2004–2006: VG Oostende
- 2006–2008: KV Oostende
- 2008–2009: Cercle Brugge
- 2009–2011: KV Oostende
- 2011–2013: Gent

Senior career*
Years	Team	Apps	(Gls)
2013–2015	Gent	2	(0)
2015	→ Cercle Brugge (loan)	7	(1)
2015–2017	FC Eindhoven	55	(17)
2017–2019	Excelsior	18	(2)
2019–2021	Knokke	6	(1)
Total		88	(21)

International career
2011	Belgium U15	4	(0)
2012	Belgium U16	8	(2)
2012–2013	Belgium U17	15	(5)
2014	Belgium U18	5	(0)
2013–2014	Belgium U19	7	(1)
- * Club domestic league appearances and goals

Jinty Caenepeel (born 18 July 1996) is a Belgian former professional footballer who played as a winger.

== Club career ==
=== Gent ===
Caenepeel played youth football at VG Oostende, KV Oostende, Cercle Brugge and Gent. In the summer of 2013, he had an offer to join the Juventus academy, but Gent refused the offer. Caenepeel, who preferred to play as a right winger, was praised as a youth player for his speed, control and solid shot, although his combination game was initially seen as substandard and given his wing position, his crosses and passes were areas in which he could improve.

He made his Jupiler Pro League debut on 19 October 2013 in the 11th round of the 2013–14 season against Lokeren replacing César Arzo after 79 minutes in a 2–2 draw.

==== Cercle Brugge (loan) ====
As Caenepeel struggled to gain playing time at Gent, he was sent on a six-month loan to Cercle Brugge in January 2015. On his official debut on 17 January 2015, he also scored his first goal in the Jupiler Pro League against Sporting Charleroi. Despite this, he was unable to prevent the relegation of Cercle Brugge at the end of the season. After his loan period, his contract with Gent was terminated by mutual agreement.

=== Eindhoven ===
In August 2015, Caenepeel signed a three-year contract with FC Eindhoven, the runner-up of the previous season in the Dutch second-tier Eerste Divisie. In his debut season, he immediately scored fifteen goals and made seven assists. In the third period of the 2015–16 season he was awarded the Bronze Bull for best player. After his debut season, he had interest from the EFL Championship club Barnsley. Caenepeel ultimately did not leave, partly because Eindhoven demanded at least half a million euros.

In his second season, the arrival of Belgian compatriots Yanni De Vriendt and Tibo Van de Velde added to the Belgian core of Eindhoven, which already included Dario Van den Buijs, Sebastiaan De Wilde, Maxime Gunst, Timothy Durwael, Fries Deschilder, Tibeau Swinnen and Jari Vandeputte, beside Caenepeel. That season, Caenepeel scored two goals – both in the 6–2 derby win over NAC Breda – and recorded eight assists in the Eerste Divisie.

=== Excelsior ===
In July 2017, Caenepeel signed with Eredivisie club Excelsior. There, he was reunited with head coach Mitchell van der Gaag, who had coached him his first season in Eindhoven. Due to off-the-field problems, which included a hit and run after an accident and driving under the influence of cannabis, Caenepeel was never able to fully emerge as a key player at Excelsior.

=== Knokke ===
On 2 September 2019, Belgian club Knokke confirmed, that Caenpeel had joined the club on a contract until the summer 2021. In the 2019–20 season, he made six league appearances in the Belgian Second Amateur Division, in which he scored once. In the 2020–21 season, in which Knokke only played five official games due to the COVID-19 pandemic suspending league activities, Caenepeel did not play once. During this period, Caenepeel lost his motivation to play football, after which he announced his retirement from the game in the summer of 2021.

== Career statistics ==
Appearances and goals by club, season and competition
Club	Season	League			Cup		Other		Total	
Club	Season	Division	Apps	Goals	Apps	Goals	Apps	Goals	Apps	Goals
Gent	2013–14	Belgian Pro League	2	0	0	0	0	0	2	0
Gent	2014–15	Belgian Pro League	0	0	0	0	0	0	0	0
Gent	Total		2	0	0	0	0	0	2	0
Cercle Brugge (loan)	2014–15	Belgian Pro League	7	1	2	0	0	0	9	1
FC Eindhoven	2015–16	Eerste Divisie	29	15	0	0	2 (Note: Appearances in Promotion play-offs)	0	31	15
FC Eindhoven	2016–17	Eerste Divisie	26	2	2	1	0	0	28	3
FC Eindhoven	Total		55	17	0	0	2	0	57	17
Excelsior	2017–18	Eredivisie	17	2	0	0	0	0	17	2
Excelsior	2018–19	Eredivisie	1	0	0	0	0	0	1	0
Excelsior	Total		18	2	0	0	0	0	18	2
Knokke	2019–20	Division 2	6	1	0	0	0	0	6	1
Knokke	2020–21	Division 1	0	0	0	0	0	0	0	0
Knokke	Total		6	1	0	0	0	0	6	1
Career totals			88	21	4	1	2	0	94	22
