= Sam Valcke =

Belgian footballer (born 1992)

Personal information
- Full name: Sam Josip Valcke
- Date of birth: 16 December 1992 (age 33)
- Place of birth: Belgium
- Height: 1.88 m (6 ft 2 in)
- Position: Attacking midfielder

Team information
- Current team: Roeselare
- Number: 16

Youth career
- KFC Malderen
- Eendracht Aalst
- KV Mechelen

Senior career*
Years	Team	Apps	(Gls)
2013–2014	Londerzeel SK	33	(18)
2014–2016	Cercle Brugge	27	(2)
2016–2019	Lommel United	63	(11)
2019–2022	FCV Dender EH	34	(9)
2022–2024	Patro Eisden	29	(5)
2023–2024	→ Belisia Bilzen (loan)	22	(6)
2024–	Belisia Bilzen	14	(6)
2025	→ Sporting Hasselt (loan)	9	(3)
2025–2026	Sporting Hasselt	20	(8)
2026–	Roeselare	5	(0)
- * Club domestic league appearances and goals as of 30 September 2026

Sam Josip Valcke (born 16 December 1992) is a Belgian footballer who plays for Belgian Division 1 club Roeselare as an attacking midfielder.

== Club career ==
Valcke joined Cercle Brugge in 2014 from Londerzeel SK. He made his Belgian Pro League debut at 26 July 2014 at the opening game of the 2013–14 season against Gent.

In July 2023, Valcke agreed with his club Patro Eisden that he will be sent on a two-year loan to Belisia Bilzen in Belgian Division 2. The end of the loan will coincide with the expiration of his contract with Patro Eisden.
