= Olivier Werner =

Belgian footballer

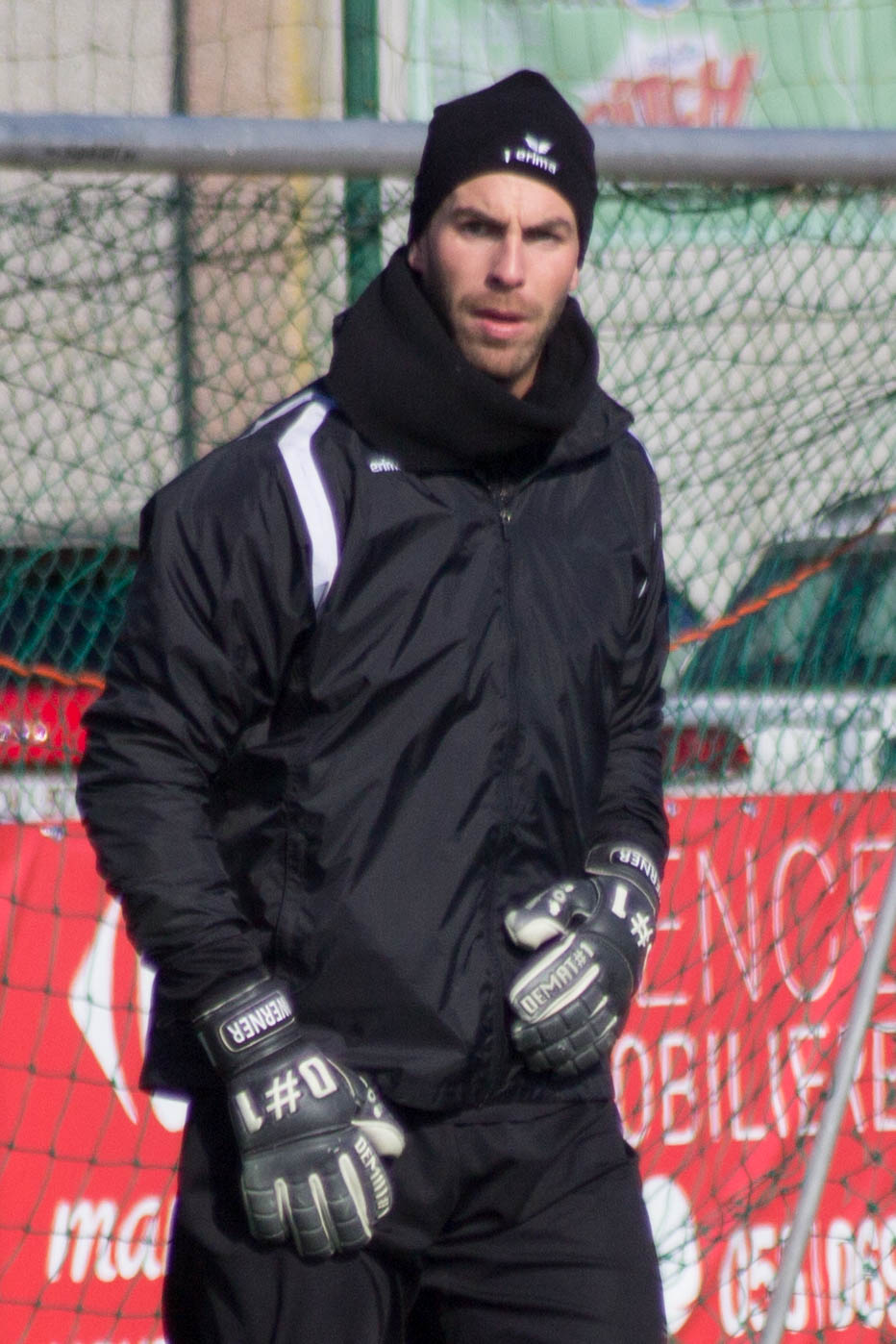

Personal information
- Full name: Olivier Werner
- Date of birth: 16 April 1985 (age 41)
- Place of birth: Malmedy, Belgium
- Height: 1.93 m (6 ft 4 in)
- Position: Goalkeeper

Team information
- Current team: Seraing

Youth career
- 1994–2003: Standard Liège

Senior career*
Years	Team	Apps	(Gls)
2003–2007	Standard Liège	0	(0)
2004–2005	→ Mons (loan)	1	(0)
2005–2006	→ Virton (loan)	33	(0)
2006–2007	→ KV Mechelen (loan)	23	(0)
2007–2010	FC Brussels	70	(0)
2010–2011	Eupen	20	(0)
2011–2014	Mons	60	(0)
2014–2015	Cercle Brugge	33	(0)
2015–2017	Sochaux	31	(0)
2017–2019	Excel Mouscron	16	(0)
2019–2021	Seraing	29	(0)
Total		316	(0)
- * Club domestic league appearances and goals as of 14:21, 29 April 2021 (UTC)

Olivier Werner (born 16 April 1985) is a Belgian former professional football goalkeeper.

== Career ==
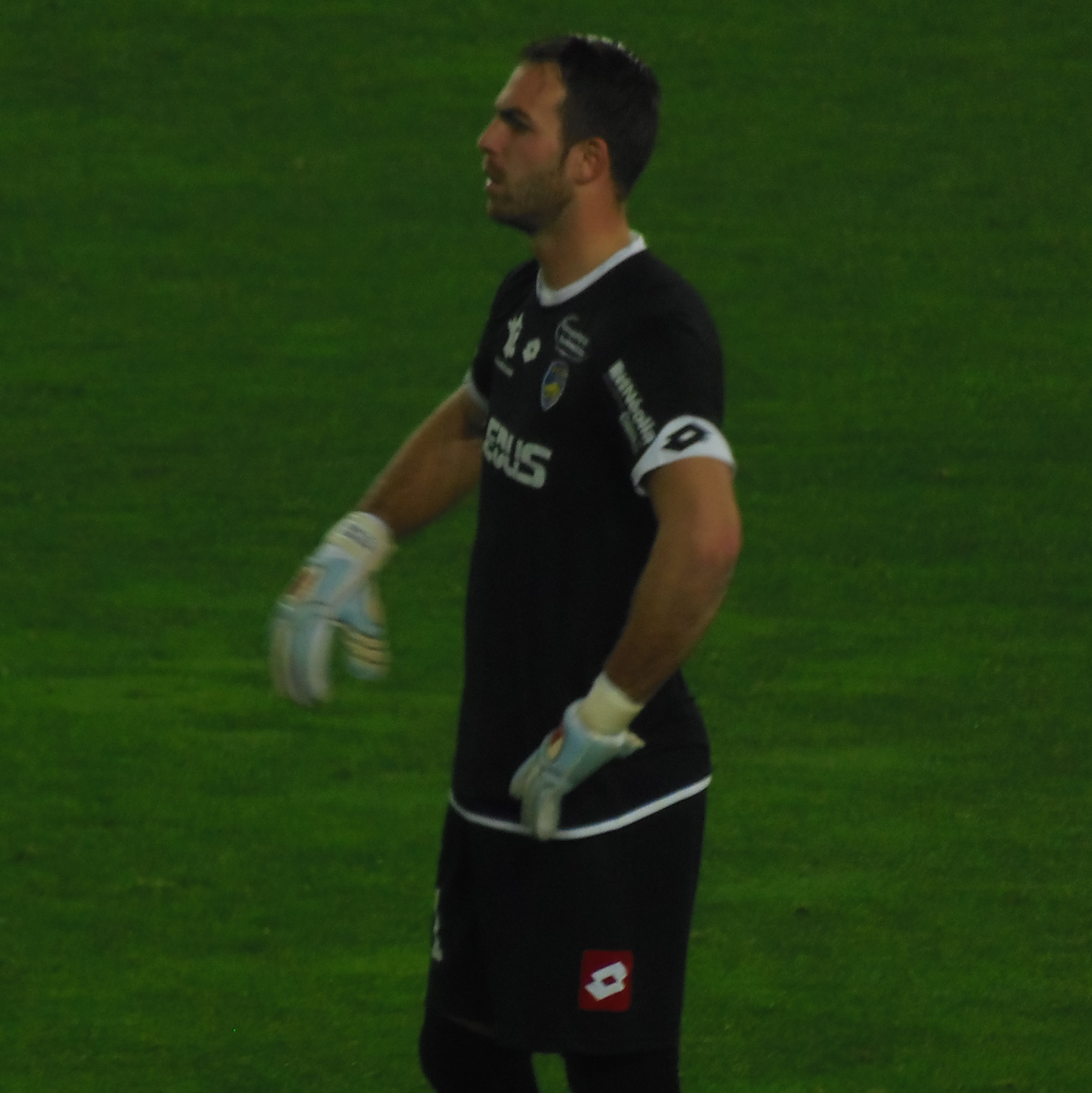

Werner previously played for KV Mechelen, FC Brussels, Eupen, Mons and Cercle Brugge. Following the 2016–17 season, Werner's contract at Sochaux was not prolonged, making him a free agent player. In December 2017, he was signed by Excel Mouscron as an emergency goalkeeper, following injuries to Logan Bailly and Jean Butez.
