= Thomas De Bie =

Belgian footballer

Personal information
- Full name: Thomas De Bie
- Date of birth: 29 January 1997 (age 29)
- Place of birth: Belgium
- Height: 1.82 m (5 ft 11 1/2 in)
- Position: Goalkeeper

Team information
- Current team: Tubize

Youth career
- KV Mechelen

Senior career*
Years	Team	Apps	(Gls)
2014–2017	Cercle Brugge	6	(0)
2017–2019	KV Oostende	0	(0)
2019–	Tubize	121	(0)
- * Club domestic league appearances and goals as of 6 June 2025

Thomas De Bie (born 25 August 1997) is a Belgian footballer who currently plays for Tubize in the Belgian First Amateur Division as a goalkeeper.
