= Thibaut Van Acker =

Belgian footballer (born 1991)

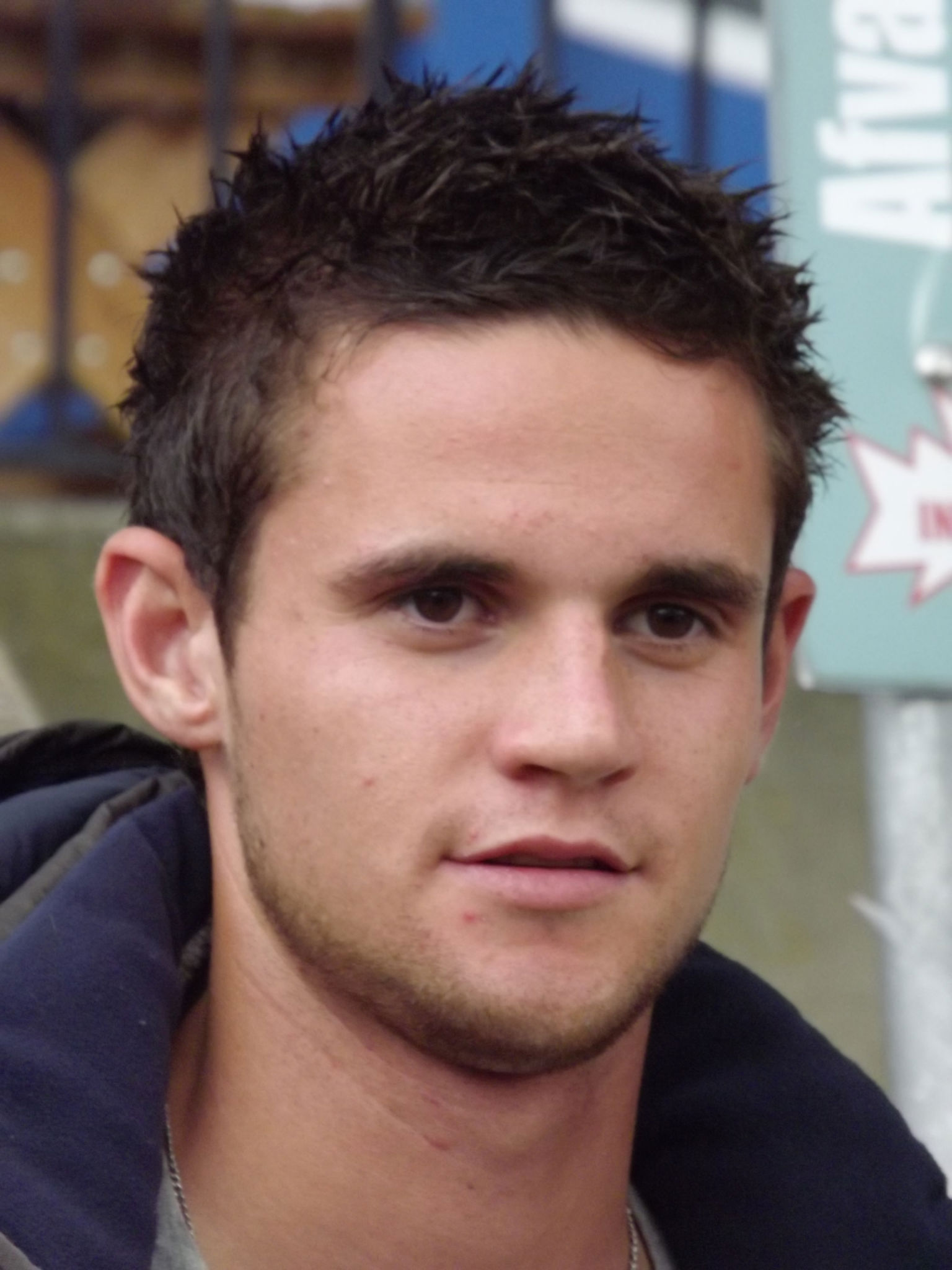
- Van Acker in July 2012

Personal information
- Date of birth: 21 November 1991 (age 34)
- Place of birth: Merendree, Belgium
- Height: 1.83 m (6 ft 0 in)
- Position: Midfielder

Team information
- Current team: Eendracht Aalst Lede

Youth career
- 1997–2009: Club Brugge

Senior career*
| Years | Team | Apps | (Gls) |
| 2009–2013 | Club Brugge | 34 | (0) |
| 2012–2013 | → Beerschot (loan) | 11 | (0) |
| 2013–2016 | Cercle Brugge | 89 | (5) |
| 2016–2019 | Roeselare | 70 | (8) |
| 2019–2021 | MVV | 59 | (1) |
| 2021–2024 | Lierse Kempenzonen | 88 | (27) |
| 2024 | Deinze | 11 | (1) |
| 2025–2026 | Club NXT | 30 | (5) |
| 2026– | Eendracht Aalst Lede | 4 | (0) |

International career
| 2010 | Belgium U19 | 4 | (0) |
| 2010–2012 | Belgium U21 | 7 | (0) |
- * Club domestic league appearances and goals as of 27 September 2026

Thibaut Van Acker (born 21 November 1991) is a Belgian professional footballer who plays as a midfielder for Eendracht Aalst Lede in the fourth-tier Belgian Division 2.

== Club career ==
=== Club Brugge ===
Born in Merendree, Van Acker joined the academy at Club Brugge at the age of four. On 3 November 2009, he signed his first professional contract for the club on 3 November 2009, lasting until the summer of 2012. He made his debut for Club Brugge on 26 December 2010 in a 2–0 victory away at K.A.A. Gent, before going on to make a further 7 league appearances that season.

Over the next few seasons, Van Acker played a rotational role in Club Brugge's squad, and he would sign a two-year contract extension in 2011, keeping at the club until June 2014. He joined Beerschot on loan in January 2013, and made 11 league appearances for the club before returning to Club Brugge at the end of the season.

=== Cercle Brugge ===
In June 2013, Van Acker signed for fellow Brugge-based club Cercle Brugge on a three-year contract. He made his league debut for the club on 27 July 2013 in a 1–1 draw at R.A.E.C. Mons, their first game of the season, before scoring the first goal of his professional career on 5 October 2013 in a 2–1 win at K.V. Mechelen. Over three years at the club, he made 89 league appearances, scoring 5.

=== KSV Roeselare ===
Following the expiry of his contract in June 2016, Van Acker joined K.S.V. Roeselare on a two-year contract. He made his debut for the club on 5 August 2016 in a 2–2 draw at home to Lierse S.K., before going on to make 23 league appearances during the 2016–17 season, scoring once. After making 31 league appearances and scoring 3 goals during the 2017–18 season, his contract was extended by a further year. During the 2018–19 season, he made 25 league appearances dor Roeselare, in which he scored 4 goals.

=== MVV ===
In September 2019, Van Acker joined Eerste Divisie club MVV Maastricht on a one-year contract. Van Acker made his debut for MVV Maastricht on 13 September 2019 in a 2–1 defeat at home to SC Telstar, before going on to make 24 appearances for the club during the season, though he did not score. In June 2020, Van Acker signed a one-year contract extension.

=== Lierse Kempenzonen ===
On 13 April 2021, Van Acker signed a two-year contract with Lierse Kempenzonen in the Belgian First Division B.

=== Deinze ===
Van Acker joined Deinze in the summer of 2024. He left the club in December 2024 after Deinze was declared bankrupt and ceased operations.

=== Club NXT ===
On 20 January 2025, Van Acker joined Club NXT in the Challenger Pro League, where also would be a young coach in the club.

== International career ==
Van Acker has played for Belgium at under-19 and under-21 levels.
