= Andreas Luckermans =

Belgian footballer

Personal information
- Full name: Andreas Luckermans
- Date of birth: 9 July 1992 (age 34)
- Place of birth: Leuven, Belgium
- Height: 1.81 m (5 ft 11 in)
- Position: Attacking midfielder

Team information
- Current team: Bertem-Leefdaal

Youth career
- 2006–2008: Westerlo
- 2008–2011: Anderlecht

Senior career*
| Years | Team | Apps | (Gls) |
| 2011–2014 | Anderlecht | 0 | (0) |
| 2013 | → FC Dordrecht (loan) | 24 | (2) |
| 2014 | → Helmond Sport (loan) | 13 | (2) |
| 2014–2016 | KSK Heist | 37 | (1) |
| 2016–2017 | KFC Duffel | | |
| 2017–2019 | KRC Mechelen | | |
| 2019–2020 | VK Linden | | |
| 2020–2021 | SC Aarschot | | |
| 2021 | Bertem-Leefdaal | | |
| 2022–202? | VK Holsbeek | | |

International career
| 2007–2008 | Belgium U16 | 8 | (2) |
| 2008 | Belgium U17 | 2 | (1) |
| 2009–2010 | Belgium U18 | 9 | (0) |
| 2010–2011 | Belgium U19 | 6 | (0) |
- * Club domestic league appearances and goals as of 22:01, 31 October 2019 (UTC)

Andreas Luckermans (born 9 July 1992) is a Belgian footballer who plays for SC Aarschot. He formerly played on loan for Dutch sides FC Dordrecht and Helmond Sport.
