= Ismaïla N'Diaye =

Senegalese footballer (born 1988)

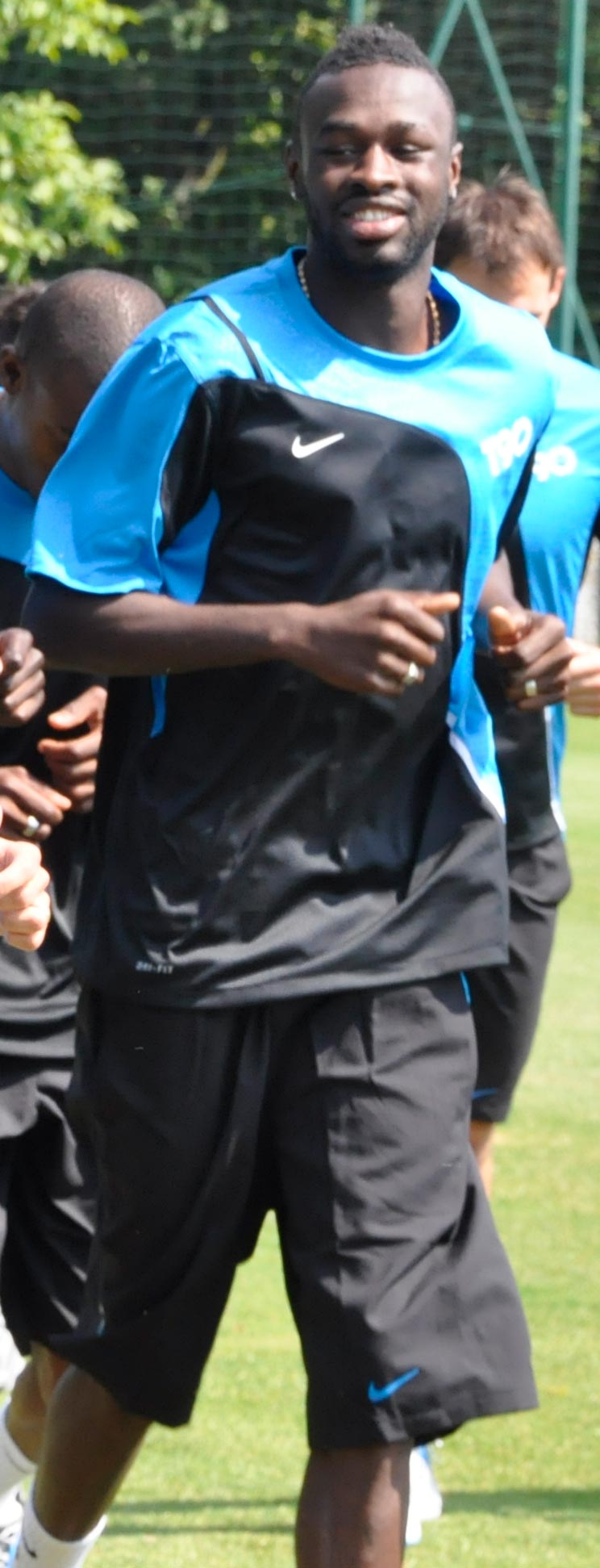

Personal information
- Date of birth: January 22, 1988 (age 38)
- Place of birth: Thiaroye, Senegal
- Height: 1.88 m (6 ft 2 in)
- Position: Midfielder

Youth career
- –2003: FC Saint-Leu
- 2003–2005: Cannes

Senior career*
Years	Team	Apps	(Gls)
2007–2011	Caen	27	(2)
2011–2014	Kortrijk	46	(0)
2014–2015	Cercle Brugge	23	(0)
2017–2018	Angoulême	18	(3)
2018–2019	FC Flers		
2019–2020	USON Mondeville		
2020–2022	Villers Houlgate CF		
- * Club domestic league appearances and goals

Ismaïla N'Diaye (born January 22, 1988) is a retired Senegalese professional football player. He previously played in the Belgian Pro League for Cercle Brugge, and for Belgian side Kortrijk and Caen in France.

== Later career ==
In the last few years of his career, N'Diaye played for several French amateur clubs, including FC Flers 61, USON Mondeville and Villers Houlgate CF, for whom he played in 2020 and two years after.

In the summer of 2022, N'Diaye ended his career and became U-18 coach for Villers Houlgate CF instead. In the summer of 2023, the club confirmed that N'Diaye would serve as assistant coach of the club's women's team.
