= Karel Van Roose =

Belgian footballer

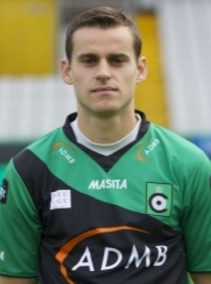

Personal information
- Date of birth: 1 April 1990 (age 36)
- Place of birth: Tielt, Belgium
- Height: 1.86 m (6 ft 1 in)
- Position: Defensive midfielder

Team information
- Current team: Sassport Boezinge

Youth career
- Zwevezele
- Ingelmunster
- Cercle Brugge

Senior career*
Years	Team	Apps	(Gls)
2010–2017	Cercle Brugge	122	(1)
2017	→ KFC Oosterzonen (loan)	13	(0)
2017–2018	→ KM Torhout (loan)		
2018–2019	→ KVC Wingene (loan)		
2019–2020	KVC Wingene		
2020–2021	SV Oostkamp		
2021–	Sassport Boezinge		

International career
2011	Belgium U21	1	(0)
- * Club domestic league appearances and goals as of 1 August 2017

Karel Van Roose (born 1 April 1990 in Tielt) is a Belgian professional football midfielder who plays for Sassport Boezinge.

== Career ==
He made his debut for the first team of Cercle Brugge on 27 October 2010 in the cup match against KFC Lille, coming on as a 59th-minute substitute for Lukas Van Eenoo.
