= Dennes De Kegel =

Belgian footballer

Personal information
- Full name: Dennes De Kegel
- Date of birth: 1 July 1994 (age 32)
- Place of birth: Belgium
- Height: 1.73 m (5 ft 8 in)
- Position: Right back

Youth career
- Anderlecht
- Genk

Senior career*
Years	Team	Apps	(Gls)
2014–2016	Cercle Brugge	38	(0)
2016–2017	Hamme	20	(0)
2017–2020	KFC Duffel		
2020–2025	SK Londerzeel		

International career
2009	Belgium U15	4	(0)
2009–2010	Belgium U16	11	(0)
2010–2011	Belgium U17	13	(0)
2011–2012	Belgium U18	4	(0)
2012–2013	Belgium U19	8	(0)
- * Club domestic league appearances and goals as of 22 October 2015

Dennes De Kegel (born 7 January 1994) is a Belgian former footballer who played as a right back for Belgian football club SK Londerzeel.

== Club career ==
De Kegel joined Cercle Brugge in January 2014 from K.R.C. Genk. He made his debut on 5 April 2014 in the Jupiler Pro League. He played the full game in a 0–1 home defeat against KV Mechelen.
