= Hans Cornelis =

Belgian football player and manager

Personal information
- Date of birth: 13 October 1982 (age 44)
- Place of birth: Eeklo, Belgium
- Height: 1.80 m (5 ft 11 in)
- Position: Right-back

Team information
- Current team: Gent (assistant manager)

Youth career
- VK Knesselare
- –2000: Club Brugge

Senior career*
Years	Team	Apps	(Gls)
2000–2005	Club Brugge	46	(2)
2005–2009	Genk	102	(4)
2009–2015	Cercle Brugge	160	(5)
2015–2017	Deinze	48	(1)
2017–2020	Zwevezele		
Total		356	(12)

International career
1996	Belgium U15	1	(0)
1998	Belgium U16	9	(0)
1997–1999	Belgium U17	6	(0)
1999–2001	Belgium U18	18	(0)
2000	Belgium U19	2	(0)
2003	Belgium U21	4	(1)

Managerial career
- 2019–2022: Zwevezele
- 2022–2025: Lokeren-Temse
- 2025–2026: Charleroi (assistant)
- 2025–2026: Charleroi
- 2026–: Gent (assistant)
- * Club domestic league appearances and goals

Hans Cornelis (born 13 October 1982) is a Belgian professional football manager and former player who is the assistant coach of Belgian Pro League club Gent.

== Playing career ==
Cornelis was part of a last minute transfer deal in the late evening of 31 August 2009. Cercle Brugge and Genk came to an extensive agreement: Cornelis was sold to Cercle Brugge, his teammate Jelle Vossen joined him on loan. Thomas Buffel made the opposite move.

Following a trial at Notts County, Cornelis joined Deinze for the 2015–16 season.

== Managerial career ==
After having played for lower league club Zwevezele from 2017, Cornelis took over as player-coach in 2019. One year later, he retired from playing football and continued as the team's manager.

After Zwevezele withdrew from the national competitions after the 2021–22 season, Cornelis was appointed new head coach of Belgian Division 2 club Lokeren-Temse on 4 June 2022. He led the club to two consecutive promotions to reach the second-tier 2024–25 Challenger Pro League.

On 27 June 2025, Cornelis was hired by Charleroi as an assistant coach to Rik De Mil. On 10 December 2025, De Mil moved to Gent mid-season, and Cornelis was appointed caretaker manager for Charleroi. He was fired from this position on 7 April 2026 and replaced with Mario Kohnen, the T2 coach.

On 10 June 2026, Cornelis was hired as an assistant coach by Gent, reuniting with De Mil.

== Honours ==
Club Brugge

- Belgian First Division A: 2002–03, 2004–05
- Belgian Cup: 2001–02, 2003–04
- Belgian Super Cup: 2002, 2003, 2004

Genk

- Belgian Cup: 2008–09
