= Kristof D'haene =

Belgian footballer

Personal information
- Date of birth: 6 June 1990 (age 36)
- Place of birth: Kortrijk, Belgium
- Height: 1.71 m (5 ft 7 1/2 in)
- Position: Left winger

Team information
- Current team: SK Roeselare

Youth career
- Stasegem
- KRC Harelbeke
- Excelsior Mouscron
- Club Brugge

Senior career*
| Years | Team | Apps | (Gls) |
| 2010–2015 | Cercle Brugge | 148 | (10) |
| 2015–2023 | Kortrijk | 220 | (11) |
| 2023– | SK Roeselare | | |

International career
| 2011 | Belgium U21 | 2 | (0) |
- * Club domestic league appearances and goals as of 8 June 2023

Kristof D'haene (born 6 June 1990) is a Belgian professional football player who plays as winger as well as wing back for an amateur side SK Roeselare.

== Career ==
He made his Cercle Brugge debut in the UEFA Europa League confrontation against TPS Turku, when he replaced Frederik Boi in the 78th minute. Cercle Brugge eventually won the match 1–2. On 21 November 2010, Kristof D'haene scored the only goal in the Bruges derby. Kristof D'haene played for Club Brugge until mid-2010. He joined Kortrijk in 2015 and became an integral part of the team, making 41 appearances in 2018–19 season.

On 14 June 2023, D'haene agreed to join an amateur side SK Roeselare in the fifth-tier Belgian Division 3.
