= Tim Smolders =

Belgian footballer (born 1980)

Personal information
- Date of birth: 26 August 1980 (age 46)
- Place of birth: Geel, Belgium
- Height: 1.91 m (6 ft 3 in)
- Position: Midfielder

Team information
- Current team: Club Brugge (head of academy)

Youth career
- 1988–1990: FC Netezonen Eindhout
- 1900–1993: Westerlo
- 1993–1998: Geel
- 1998–1999: Club Brugge

Senior career*
Years	Team	Apps	(Gls)
1999–2004	Club Brugge	64	(10)
2004–2006	RBC Roosendaal	60	(6)
2006–2008	Charleroi	82	(14)
2009–2012	Gent	82	(8)
2012–2015	Cercle Brugge	66	(5)
2015–2018	Zwevezele		
Total		354	(43)

Managerial career
- 2014–2015: Cercle Brugge (player-assistant)
- 2018–2019: Belgium U19 (assistant)
- 2019–2021: Club Brugge (U-21 assistant)
- 2021–2022: Club Brugge (head of academy)
- * Club domestic league appearances and goals

Tim Smolders (born 26 August 1980) is a Belgian former professional footballer who played as a midfielder for Club Brugge, RBC Roosendaal, Charleroi, K.A.A. Gent, and Cercle Brugge.

== Coaching and later career ==
In his last year at Cercle Brugge, Smolders combined the roles of player and assistant manager. In August 2015, Smolders joined Belgian amateur club Zwevezele, and after three years at the club, he officially retired in August 2018, when he was hired as an assistant manager for the Belgian U-19 national team under manager Jacky Mathijssen.

In June 2019, Smolders returned to Club Brugge as an assistant coach for the clubs U-21 team and talent coach for both the U-21 and U-18 teams. On 9 August 2021, Smolders was placed in a new role at Club Brugge as the Head of the clubs Academy, Club NXT Academy. On May 31, 2022, Club announced that they and Smolders had mutually agreed to part ways.

On 29 June 2026, Smolders joined Heart of Midlothian as assistant manager to the newly appointed Wouter Vrancken.

== Honours ==
Club Brugge

- Belgian First Division A: 2002–03
- Belgian Cup: 2001–02
- Belgian Super Cup: 2002
