= Stephen Buyl =

Belgian footballer

Personal information
- Date of birth: 2 September 1992 (age 34)
- Place of birth: Aalst, Belgium
- Height: 1.80 m (5 ft 11 in)
- Position: Winger

Team information
- Current team: Rupel Boom

Youth career
- 1998–2002: Eendracht Aalst
- 2002–2008: Lokeren
- 2008–2010: Gent
- 2010–2011: Hamme

Senior career*
Years	Team	Apps	(Gls)
2011–2015	Cercle Brugge	64	(11)
2015–2017	Zulte Waregem	22	(1)
2016–2017	→ Antwerp (loan)	18	(2)
2017–2018	Cercle Brugge	13	(3)
2018	→ Westerlo (loan)	10	(0)
2018–2020	Westerlo	38	(3)
2020	Roeselare	0	(0)
2020–2021	Lokeren-Temse		
2021–2022	TOP Oss	2	(1)
2022–	Rupel Boom	21	(4)
- * Club domestic league appearances and goals as of 30 June 2023

Stephen Buyl (born 2 September 1992) is a Belgian professional footballer who plays as a winger for Rupel Boom.

== Career ==
On 27 July 2020, Buyl joined Roeselare on a deal until the summer 2023 with an option for one further year. He left the club in September 2020, after its bankruptcy without making an appearance. In November 2020, he joined lower league club Lokeren-Temse.

Buyl signed with Dutch Eerste Divisie club TOP Oss on 26 July 2021, where he was reunited with manager Bob Peeters, who had coached him at Westerlo. He made his debut on 6 August in a 1–0 league win over Excelsior, coming on as a substitute in the 74th minute for Joshua Sanches.

On 9 June 2022, Buyl agreed to join Rupel Boom in the third-tier Belgian National Division 1.
