= List of Belgian football transfers winter 2014–15 =

This is a list of Belgian football transfers for the 2014-15 winter transfer window. Only transfers involving a team from the Belgian Pro League are listed.

The winter transfer window opens on 1 January 2015, although a few transfers may take place prior to that date. The window closes at midnight on 2 February 2015 although outgoing transfers might still happen to leagues in which the window is still open. Players without a club may join teams, either during or in between transfer windows.

== Sorted by date ==
=== December 2014 ===
| Date | Name | Moving from | Moving to | Fee | Note |
|---|---|---|---|---|---|
| December 16, 2014 | (Belgium) Frederik Boi | (Belgium) Cercle Brugge | (Belgium) Izegem | Released | |
| December 16, 2014 | (North Macedonia) Tome Pačovski | (Belgium) Mechelen | (North Macedonia) Vardar Skopje | Undisclosed | |
| December 17, 2014 | (Bosnia and Herzegovina) Haris Hajradinović | (Slovakia) Trenčín | (Belgium) Gent | Undisclosed | |
| December 18, 2014 | (Zimbabwe) Knowledge Musona | (Germany) TSG 1899 Hoffenheim | (Belgium) Oostende | Undisclosed | |
| December 19, 2014 | (Senegal) Mbaye Diagne | (Italy) Juventus | (Belgium) Westerlo | Loan | |
| December 19, 2014 | (Greece) Valentinos Vlachos | (Belgium) Club Brugge | Free Agent | Released | |
| December 20, 2014 | (Spain) Jonathan Viera | (Belgium) Standard Liège | (Spain) Las Palmas | Loan | |
| December 21, 2014 | (Brazil) Fernando Menegazzo | (Belgium) Club Brugge | Free Agent | Released | |
| December 23, 2014 | (Croatia) Antonio Milić | (Croatia) Hajduk Split | (Belgium) Oostende | Undisclosed | |
| December 23, 2014 | (Netherlands) Albian Muzaqi | (Belgium) Genk | (Belgium) Cercle Brugge | Loan | |
| December 29, 2014 | (Luxembourg) Anthony Moris | Free Agent | (Belgium) Mechelen | NA | |
| December 29, 2014 | (Spain) Walter | (Belgium) Lokeren | (Greece) Skoda Xanthi | Released | |
| December 30, 2014 | (Belgium) Maarten Martens | (Greece) PAOK | (Belgium) Cercle Brugge | Loan | |

=== January 2015 ===
| Date | Name | Moving from | Moving to | Fee | Note |
|---|---|---|---|---|---|
| January 1, 2015 | (Brazil) Ygor Nogueira | (Belgium) Gent | (Brazil) Fluminense | Loan return | |
| January 1, 2015 | (North Macedonia) Damjan Šiškovski | (North Macedonia) Rabotnički | (Belgium) Gent | Undisclosed | |
| January 1, 2015 | (Brazil) Wigor | (Belgium) Anderlecht | Released | NA | |
| January 2, 2015 | (Belgium) Alessandro Cordaro | (Belgium) Mechelen | (Belgium) Zulte Waregem | Undisclosed | |
| January 3, 2015 | (Cameroon) Antonio Ghomsi | (Belgium) Mechelen | (Greece) Skoda Xanthi | Undisclosed | |
| January 3, 2015 | (Egypt) Karim Hafez | (Belgium) Lierse | (Egypt) Wadi Degla | Loan | |
| January 3, 2015 | (Belgium) Guillaume Hubert | (Belgium) Standard Liège | (Belgium) Sint-Truiden | Loan | |
| January 3, 2015 | (Belgium) François Marquet | (Belgium) Standard Liège | (Netherlands) Jong PSV | Loan | |
| January 3, 2015 | (Serbia) Dušan Mićić | (Serbia) Napredak Kruševac | (Belgium) Lierse | Undisclosed | |
| January 3, 2015 | (Belgium) Brice Ntambwe | (Belgium) Mons | (Belgium) Lierse | Undisclosed | |
| January 4, 2015 | (Netherlands) Stefano Denswil | (Netherlands) Ajax | (Belgium) Club Brugge | Undisclosed | |
| January 4, 2015 | (England) Jordan Mustoe | Free agent | (Belgium) Westerlo | NA | |
| January 5, 2015 | (Belgium) Jinty Caenepeel | (Belgium) Gent | (Belgium) Cercle Brugge | Loan | |
| January 6, 2015 | (France) Ghislain Gimbert | (France) Troyes | (Belgium) Zulte Waregem | Undisclosed | |
| January 6, 2015 | (Scotland) Tony Watt | (Belgium) Standard Liège | (England) Charlton Athletic | Undisclosed | |
| January 7, 2015 | (Kosovo) Rron Broja | (Kosovo) Trepça'89 | (Belgium) Gent | Undisclosed | |
| January 7, 2015 | (Nigeria) Moses Simon | (Slovakia) Trenčín | (Belgium) Gent | Undisclosed | |
| January 7, 2015 | (Bosnia and Herzegovina) Enes Šipović | (Romania) Oțelul Galați | (Belgium) Westerlo | Undisclosed | |
| January 8, 2015 | (North Macedonia) Daniel Mojsov | (Norway) Brann Bergen | (Belgium) Lierse | Free | |
| January 8, 2015 | (Slovenia) Etien Velikonja | (England) Cardiff City | (Belgium) Lierse | Loan | |
| January 9, 2015 | (Belgium) Theo Bongonda | (Belgium) Zulte Waregem | (Spain) Celta de Vigo | Undisclosed | |
| January 9, 2015 | (Belgium) Onur Kaya | (Belgium) Lokeren | (Belgium) Zulte Waregem | Undisclosed | |
| January 10, 2015 | (Belgium) Anthony Swolfs | (Belgium) Club Brugge | (Belgium) Mechelen | Undisclosed | |
| January 12, 2015 | (Belgium) Jason Adesanya | (Belgium) Mechelen | (Belgium) Lommel United | Loan | |
| January 12, 2015 | (Guinea-Bissau) Amido Baldé | (Belgium) Waasland-Beveren | (Scotland) Celtic | Loan Return | (Note: Baldé was on loan from Waasland-Beveren to Celtic during the first half of the 2014-15 season. The loan was ended and Baldé was immediately loaned out to Hapoel Tel Aviv.) |
| January 12, 2015 | (France) Nicolas Verdier | (France) Brest | (Belgium) Mechelen | Undisclosed | |
| January 13, 2015 | (Belgium) Jonathan Blondel | (Belgium) Club Brugge | Free Agent | Retired | |
| January 13, 2015 | (Brazil) Claudemir | (Denmark) Copenhagen | (Belgium) Club Brugge | Undisclosed | |
| January 13, 2015 | (Belgium) Benjamin Mokulu | (Belgium) Mechelen | (Italy) Avellino | Undisclosed | (Note: Mokulu was on loan from Mechelen to Bastia during the first half of the 2014-15 season. The loan ended but Mokulu was immediately sold to Avellino.) |
| January 15, 2015 | (Nigeria) Wilfred Ndidi | (Nigeria) Nath Boys | (Belgium) Genk | Undisclosed | |
| January 16, 2015 | (Ukraine) Ihor Berezovskyi | (Belgium) Lierse | (Belgium) Sint-Truiden | Loan | |
| January 16, 2015 | (Cameroon) Willie Overtoom | (Belgium) Zulte Waregem | Released | NA | |
| January 16, 2015 | (Poland) Rafał Wolski | (Italy) Fiorentina | (Belgium) Mechelen | Loan | |
| January 17, 2015 | (Latvia) Valērijs Šabala | (Belgium) Club Brugge | (Czech Republic) Jablonec | Loan | (Note: Šabala was on loan from Club Brugge to Anorthosis Famagusta in the first half of the 2014-15 season. The loan ended but Šabala was immediately loaned to Jablonec.) |
| January 18, 2015 | (Belgium) Laurent Ciman | (Belgium) Standard Liège | (Canada) Montreal Impact | Undisclosed | |
| January 19, 2015 | (Japan) Kensuke Nagai | (Belgium) Standard Liège | (Japan) Nagoya Grampus | Undisclosed | (Note: Nagai was already on loan from Standard Liège to Nagoya Grampus since August 2013. The loan was terminated as Nagai moved to Nagoya Grampus on a permanent basis.) |
| January 20, 2015 | (Germany) Marko Marin | (England) Chelsea | (Belgium) Anderlecht | Loan | |
| January 20, 2015 | (Denmark) Alexander Scholz | (Belgium) Lokeren | (Belgium) Standard Liège | Undisclosed | |
| January 21, 2015 | (Serbia) Marko Poletanović | (Serbia) Vojvodina | (Belgium) Gent | Undisclosed | |
| January 21, 2015 | (Poland) Waldemar Sobota | (Belgium) Club Brugge | (Germany) St. Pauli | Loan | |
| January 22, 2015 | (Belgium) Jorn Brondeel | (Belgium) Antwerp | (Belgium) Lierse | Undisclosed | |
| January 22, 2015 | (Spain) Joan Capdevila | (India) NorthEast United | (Belgium) Lierse | Free | |
| January 22, 2015 | (Belgium) Dylan De Belder | (Belgium) Mons | (Belgium) Waasland-Beveren | Free | |
| January 22, 2015 | (Ghana) Kevin Osei | (France) Olympique Marseille | (Belgium) Waasland-Beveren | Free | |
| January 22, 2015 | (Belgium) Floriano Vanzo | (Belgium) Club Brugge | (Belgium) Waasland-Beveren | Undisclosed | |
| January 23, 2015 | (Switzerland) Karim Rossi | (England) Hull City | (Belgium) Zulte Waregem | Free | |
| January 23, 2015 | (Belgium) Jonathan Wilmet | (Belgium) Oostende | (Belgium) Waasland-Beveren | Loan | |
| January 26, 2015 | (Greece) Apostolos Vellios | (Belgium) Lierse | (Denmark) Vestsjælland | Loan | |
| January 27, 2015 | (France) Alexandre Coeff | (Italy) Udinese | (Belgium) Mouscron-Péruwelz | Loan | |
| January 27, 2015 | (France) Jerry Vandam | (Belgium) Mechelen | (Belgium) Waasland-Beveren | Free | |
| January 28, 2015 | (Chile) Nicolás Castillo | (Belgium) Club Brugge | (Germany) 1. FSV Mainz 05 | Loan | |
| January 28, 2015 | (United States) Sacha Kljestan | (Belgium) Anderlecht | (United States) New York Red Bulls | Undisclosed | |
| January 29, 2015 | (Belgium) Christophe Lepoint | (Belgium) Gent | (England) Charlton Athletic | Undisclosed | |
| January 29, 2015 | (Netherlands) Glynor Plet | (Belgium) Zulte Waregem | (Netherlands) Go Ahead Eagles | Loan | |
| January 31, 2015 | (Sweden) Jiloan Hamad | (Germany) TSG 1899 Hoffenheim | (Belgium) Standard Liège | Loan | |

=== February 2015 ===
| Date | Name | Moving from | Moving to | Fee | Note |
|---|---|---|---|---|---|
| February 1, 2015 | (Bosnia and Herzegovina) Edin Cocalić | (Israel) Maccabi Haifa | (Belgium) Mechelen | Undisclosed | |
| February 1, 2015 | (Nigeria) Imoh Ezekiel | (Qatar) Al-Arabi | (Belgium) Standard Liège | Loan | |
| February 1, 2015 | (Belgium) Paul-Jose M'Poku | (Belgium) Standard Liège | (Italy) Cagliari | Undisclosed | |
| February 1, 2015 | (France) Alassane També | (Belgium) Kortrijk | (Italy) Genoa | Undisclosed | |
| February 2, 2015 | (Algeria) Djamel Abdoun | (England) Nottingham Forest | (Belgium) Lokeren | Loan | |
| February 2, 2015 | (Morocco) Rachid Bourabia | (Belgium) Lierse | (Belgium) Waasland-Beveren | Undisclosed | |
| February 2, 2015 | (Mali) Abdoulay Diaby | (Belgium) Mouscron-Péruwelz | (France) Lille | Loan Return | |
| February 2, 2015 | (Belgium) Tuur Dierckx | (Belgium) Kortrijk | (Belgium) Club Brugge | Loan Return | |
| February 2, 2015 | (France) Jérémy Dumesnil | (Belgium) Oostende | (Belgium) Mouscron-Péruwelz | Loan | |
| February 2, 2015 | (Iceland) Sverrir Ingi Ingason | (Norway) Viking | (Belgium) Lokeren | Undisclosed | |
| February 2, 2015 | (Cameroon) Dorge Kouemaha | (Belgium) Lierse | (Turkey) Denizlispor | Loan | |
| February 2, 2015 | (Belgium) Jonathan Legear | (England) Blackpool | (Belgium) Standard Liège | Free | |
| February 2, 2015 | (Belgium) Sébastien Locigno | (Belgium) Gent | (Belgium) Oostende | Loan | |
| February 2, 2015 | (Argentina) Hernán Losada | (Belgium) Lierse | Free Agent | Contract Terminated | |
| February 2, 2015 | (Croatia) Dario Melnjak | (Croatia) Slaven Belupo | (Belgium) Lokeren | Undisclosed | |
| February 2, 2015 | (Serbia) Dušan Mićić | (Belgium) Lierse | Free Agent | Contract Terminated | |
| February 2, 2015 | (France) Ronny Rodelin | (France) Lille | (Belgium) Mouscron-Péruwelz | Loan | |
| February 2, 2015 | (Portugal) Rolando | (Portugal) Porto | (Belgium) Anderlecht | Loan | |
| February 2, 2015 | (Belgium) Giuseppe Rossini | (Belgium) Charleroi | (Belgium) OH Leuven | Loan | |
| February 2, 2015 | (Netherlands) Arjan Swinkels | (Belgium) Lierse | (Netherlands) Roda JC | Free | |
| February 2, 2015 | (Guinea) Idrissa Sylla | (Belgium) Zulte Waregem | (Belgium) Anderlecht | Undisclosed | |
| February 4, 2015 | (Bosnia and Herzegovina) Faris Handžić | (Bosnia and Herzegovina) Sarajevo | (Belgium) Westerlo | Free | |

== Sorted by team ==
=== Anderlecht ===
In:

| No. | Pos. | Nation | Player |
|---|---|---|---|
| 8 | FW | GUI | Idrissa Sylla (from (Belgium) Zulte Waregem) |
| 11 | MF | GER | Marko Marin (on loan from (England) Chelsea) |
| 13 | DF | POR | Rolando (on loan from (Portugal) Porto) |

Out:

| No. | Pos. | Nation | Player |
|---|---|---|---|
| 19 | MF | USA | Sacha Kljestan (to (United States) New York Red Bulls) |
| 40 | MF | BRA | Wigor (released) |

=== Cercle Brugge ===
In:

| No. | Pos. | Nation | Player |
|---|---|---|---|
| 9 | FW | NED | Albian Muzaqi (on loan from (Belgium) Genk) |
| 26 | MF | BEL | Maarten Martens (on loan from (Greece) PAOK) |
| 96 | MF | BEL | Jinty Caenepeel (on loan from (Belgium) Gent) |

Out:

| No. | Pos. | Nation | Player |
|---|---|---|---|
| 12 | MF | BEL | Frederik Boi (to (Belgium) Izegem) |

=== Charleroi ===
In:

| No. | Pos. | Nation | Player |

Out:

| No. | Pos. | Nation | Player |
|---|---|---|---|
| 9 | FW | BEL | Giuseppe Rossini (on loan to (Belgium) OH Leuven) |

=== Club Brugge ===
In:

| No. | Pos. | Nation | Player |
|---|---|---|---|
| 6 | MF | BRA | Claudemir (from (Denmark) Copenhagen) |
| 24 | DF | NED | Stefano Denswil (from (Netherlands) Ajax) |
| — | FW | BEL | Tuur Dierckx (loan return from (Belgium) Kortrijk) |

Out:

| No. | Pos. | Nation | Player |
|---|---|---|---|
| 6 | MF | BRA | Fernando Menegazzo (released) |
| 11 | MF | BEL | Jonathan Blondel (retired) |
| 17 | MF | POL | Waldemar Sobota (on loan to (Germany) St. Pauli) |
| 30 | FW | CHI | Nicolás Castillo (on loan to (Germany) 1. FSV Mainz 05) |
| — | FW | LVA | Valērijs Šabala (was on loan to (Cyprus) Anorthosis Famagusta, now loaned to (Czech Republic) Jablonec) |
| — | GK | BEL | Anthony Swolfs (to (Belgium) Mechelen) |
| — | FW | BEL | Floriano Vanzo (to (Belgium) Waasland-Beveren) |
| — | DF | GRE | Valentinos Vlachos (released) |

=== Genk ===
In:

| No. | Pos. | Nation | Player |
|---|---|---|---|
| 25 | DF | NGA | Wilfred Ndidi (from (Nigeria) Nath Boys) |

Out:

| No. | Pos. | Nation | Player |
|---|---|---|---|
| 18 | FW | NED | Albian Muzaqi (on loan to (Belgium) Cercle Brugge) |

=== Gent ===
In:

| No. | Pos. | Nation | Player |
|---|---|---|---|
| 18 | MF | BIH | Haris Hajradinović (from (Slovakia) Trenčín) |
| 20 | GK | MKD | Damjan Šiškovski (from (North Macedonia) Rabotnički) |
| 27 | FW | NGA | Moses Simon (from (Slovakia) Trenčín) |
| — | FW | KOS | Rron Broja (from (Kosovo) Trepça'89) |
| — | MF | SRB | Marko Poletanović (from (Serbia) Vojvodina) |

Out:

| No. | Pos. | Nation | Player |
|---|---|---|---|
| 3 | MF | BRA | Ygor Nogueira (loan return to (Brazil) Fluminense) |
| 18 | MF | BEL | Jinty Caenepeel (on loan to (Belgium) Cercle Brugge) |
| 22 | DF | BEL | Sébastien Locigno (to (Belgium) Oostende) |
| 26 | MF | BEL | Christophe Lepoint (to (England) Charlton Athletic) |

=== Kortrijk ===
In:

| No. | Pos. | Nation | Player |

Out:

| No. | Pos. | Nation | Player |
|---|---|---|---|
| 5 | DF | FRA | Alassane També (to (Italy) Genoa) |
| 55 | FW | BEL | Tuur Dierckx (loan return to (Belgium) Club Brugge) |

=== Lierse ===
In:

| No. | Pos. | Nation | Player |
|---|---|---|---|
| 6 | DF | ESP | Joan Capdevila (from (India) NorthEast United) |
| 19 | DF | MKD | Daniel Mojsov (from (Norway) Brann Bergen) |
| 23 | FW | SVN | Etien Velikonja (on loan from (England) Cardiff City) |
| 26 | GK | BEL | Jorn Brondeel (from (Belgium) Antwerp) |
| 39 | MF | BEL | Brice Ntambwe (from (Belgium) Mons) |

Out:

| No. | Pos. | Nation | Player |
|---|---|---|---|
| 1 | GK | UKR | Ihor Berezovskyi (on loan to (Belgium) Sint-Truiden) |
| 4 | DF | NED | Arjan Swinkels (to (Netherlands) Roda JC) |
| 7 | FW | GRE | Apostolos Vellios (on loan to (Denmark) Vestsjælland) |
| 10 | MF | ARG | Hernán Losada (released) |
| 25 | MF | MAR | Rachid Bourabia (to (Belgium) Waasland-Beveren) |
| 28 | FW | CMR | Dorge Kouemaha (on loan to (Turkey) Denizlispor) |
| 34 | MF | SRB | Dušan Mićić (from (Serbia) Napredak Kruševac, then released) |
| — | DF | EGY | Karim Hafez (on loan to (Egypt) Wadi Degla) |

=== Lokeren ===
In:

| No. | Pos. | Nation | Player |
|---|---|---|---|
| — | MF | ALG | Djamel Abdoun (on loan from (England) Nottingham Forest) |
| — | DF | ISL | Sverrir Ingi Ingason (from (Norway) Viking) |
| — | DF | CRO | Dario Melnjak (from (Croatia) Slaven Belupo) |

Out:

| No. | Pos. | Nation | Player |
|---|---|---|---|
| 2 | DF | DEN | Alexander Scholz (to (Belgium) Standard Liège) |
| 11 | MF | BEL | Onur Kaya (to (Belgium) Zulte Waregem) |
| — | MF | ESP | Walter (to (Greece) Skoda Xanthi) |

=== Mechelen ===
In:

| No. | Pos. | Nation | Player |
|---|---|---|---|
| 28 | GK | LUX | Anthony Moris (free agent) |
| 49 | GK | BEL | Anthony Swolfs (from (Belgium) Club Brugge) |
| 99 | FW | FRA | Nicolas Verdier (from (France) Brest) |
| — | DF | BIH | Edin Cocalić (from (Israel) Maccabi Haifa) |
| — | MF | POL | Rafał Wolski (on loan from (Italy) Fiorentina) |

Out:

| No. | Pos. | Nation | Player |
|---|---|---|---|
| 8 | MF | FRA | Jerry Vandam (to (Belgium) Waasland-Beveren) |
| 16 | FW | BEL | Jason Adesanya (on loan to (Belgium) Lommel United) |
| 26 | DF | CMR | Antonio Ghomsi (to (Greece) Skoda Xanthi) |
| 28 | GK | MKD | Tome Pačovski (to (North Macedonia) Vardar Skopje) |
| 29 | MF | BEL | Alessandro Cordaro (to (Belgium) Zulte Waregem) |
| — | FW | BEL | Benjamin Mokulu (was on loan to (France) Bastia, now sold to (Italy) Avellino) |

=== Mouscron-Péruwelz ===
In:

| No. | Pos. | Nation | Player |
|---|---|---|---|
| 4 | MF | FRA | Alexandre Coeff (on loan from (Italy) Udinese) |
| — | GK | FRA | Jérémy Dumesnil (on loan from (Belgium) Oostende) |
| — | FW | FRA | Ronny Rodelin (on loan from (France) Lille) |

Out:

| No. | Pos. | Nation | Player |
|---|---|---|---|
| 23 | FW | MLI | Abdoulay Diaby (loan return to (France) Lille) |

=== Oostende ===
In:

| No. | Pos. | Nation | Player |
|---|---|---|---|
| 11 | FW | ZIM | Knowledge Musona (from (Germany) TSG 1899 Hoffenheim) |
| 19 | DF | CRO | Antonio Milić (from (Croatia) Hajduk Split) |
| — | DF | BEL | Sébastien Locigno (from (Belgium) Gent) |

Out:

| No. | Pos. | Nation | Player |
|---|---|---|---|
| 22 | FW | BEL | Jonathan Wilmet (on loan to (Belgium) Waasland-Beveren) |
| 30 | GK | FRA | Jérémy Dumesnil (on loan to (Belgium) Mouscron-Péruwelz) |

=== Standard Liège ===
In:

| No. | Pos. | Nation | Player |
|---|---|---|---|
| 11 | MF | SWE | Jiloan Hamad (on loan from (Germany) TSG 1899 Hoffenheim) |
| 13 | DF | DEN | Alexander Scholz (from (Belgium) Lokeren) |
| — | FW | NGA | Imoh Ezekiel (on loan from (Qatar) Al-Arabi) |
| — | MF | BEL | Jonathan Legear (from (England) Blackpool) |

Out:

| No. | Pos. | Nation | Player |
|---|---|---|---|
| 6 | DF | BEL | Laurent Ciman (to (Canada) Montreal Impact) |
| 11 | MF | ESP | Jonathan Viera (on loan to (Spain) Las Palmas) |
| 13 | FW | JPN | Kensuke Nagai (was on loan to (Japan) Nagoya Grampus, now sold) |
| 28 | GK | BEL | Guillaume Hubert (on loan to (Belgium) Sint-Truiden) |
| 32 | FW | SCO | Tony Watt (to (England) Charlton Athletic) |
| 40 | MF | BEL | Paul-Jose M'Poku (to (Italy) Cagliari) |
| 45 | MF | BEL | François Marquet (on loan to (Netherlands) Jong PSV) |

=== Waasland-Beveren ===
In:

| No. | Pos. | Nation | Player |
|---|---|---|---|
| 11 | FW | BEL | Dylan De Belder (from (Belgium) Mons) |
| 21 | MF | GHA | Kevin Osei (from (France) Olympique Marseille) |
| 25 | MF | FRA | Jerry Vandam (from (Belgium) Mechelen) |
| 28 | FW | BEL | Floriano Vanzo (from (Belgium) Club Brugge) |
| 32 | FW | BEL | Jonathan Wilmet (on loan from (Belgium) Oostende) |
| — | MF | MAR | Rachid Bourabia (from (Belgium) Lierse) |

Out:

| No. | Pos. | Nation | Player |
|---|---|---|---|
| 11 | FW | GNB | Amido Baldé (loan return to (Scotland) Celtic) |

=== Westerlo ===
In:

| No. | Pos. | Nation | Player |
|---|---|---|---|
| 10 | FW | SEN | Mbaye Diagne (on loan from (Italy) Juventus) |
| 16 | DF | ENG | Jordan Mustoe (free agent) |
| 25 | DF | BIH | Enes Šipović (from (Romania) Oțelul Galați) |
| — | MF | BIH | Faris Handžić (from (Bosnia and Herzegovina) Sarajevo) |

Out:

| No. | Pos. | Nation | Player |

=== Zulte Waregem ===
In:

| No. | Pos. | Nation | Player |
|---|---|---|---|
| 14 | FW | FRA | Ghislain Gimbert (from (France) Troyes) |
| 19 | FW | SUI | Karim Rossi (from (England) Hull City) |
| 29 | MF | BEL | Alessandro Cordaro (from (Belgium) Mechelen) |
| 34 | MF | BEL | Onur Kaya (from (Belgium) Lokeren) |

Out:

| No. | Pos. | Nation | Player |
|---|---|---|---|
| 9 | FW | NED | Glynor Plet (on loan to (Netherlands) Go Ahead Eagles) |
| 11 | FW | GUI | Idrissa Sylla (to (Belgium) Anderlecht) |
| 17 | MF | CMR | Willie Overtoom (released) |
| 27 | FW | BEL | Theo Bongonda (to (Spain) Celta de Vigo) |
