= 2014–15 RSC Anderlecht season =

Anderlecht
2014–15 season
- Chairman: Roger Vanden Stock
- Manager: Besnik Hasi
- Ground: Constant Vanden Stock Stadium
- Belgian Pro League: 3rd
- Belgian Cup: Runners-up
- Belgian Super Cup: Winners
- UEFA Champions League: Group stage
- UEFA Europa League: Round of 32
- Top goalscorer: League: Aleksandar Mitrović (20); All: Aleksandar Mitrović (28)
- Highest home attendance: 26,300 vs Club Brugge, Belgian Pro League, 21 January 2015
- Lowest home attendance: 7,000 vs Zulte-Waregem, Belgian Cup, 10 May 2015
Home colours	Away colours	Third colours

The 2014–15 season is a season played by Anderlecht, a Belgian football club based in Anderlecht, Brussels. The season covers the period from 1 July 2014 to 30 June 2015. Anderlecht will be participating in the Belgian Pro League, Belgian Cup, Belgian Super Cup and the UEFA Champions League.

== Review ==
=== Pre-season ===
It was announced that Anderlecht would play six matches in preparation for the 2014-15 season, with games against Royal Knokke, Oudenaarde, Mons, Dynamo Kyiv, RFC Liège and Deinze with the pre-season matches starting from 28 June 2014 and ending on 22 July 2014.

Anderlecht kicked off their pre-season campaign with a 1-4 victory away to Royal Knokke on 28 June at Stadion Olivier. The club followed that with a 0-2 win at Oudenaarde, with goals coming from Youri Tielemans and Frank Acheampong. Anderlecht then drew 0-0 with Mons in match remembered less so for the result but more so for the return of Matías Suárez who had been out injured since October 2013 due to a serious knee injury he suffered in training at that time. On 11 July, Anderlecht faced Dynamo Kyiv in Austria. A match they won 2-1 thanks to a brace from Frank Acheampong.

On the following Wednesday, Anderlecht won their penultimate pre-season fixture when they beat RFC Liège 0-2 at the Stade du Pairay, with goals coming from Aleksandar Mitrović and Samuel Armenteros. Anderlecht won their sixth and final friendly match on July 22, beating Deinze 0-1 at the Burgemeester Van de Wiele Stadion thanks to a goal from Nathan Kabasele. Which meant the club ended pre-season unbeaten, winning five and drawing just one.

==== Transfers ====
Anderlecht's first summer signing was Brazilian Wigor Alan do Nascimento who was signed from Brazilian club Capivariano after a successful trial. The club also signed goalkeeper Mulopo Kudimbana on a permanent contract in June, with the Congolese international joining from Oostende. Samuel Armenteros, Michaël Heylen, Mehdi Tarfi and Fede Vico all returned from their loan spells at Feyenoord, Kortrijk, Zulte Waregem and Oostende respectively while Demy de Zeeuw left in the opposite direction following the completion of his loan spell from Spartak Moscow.

Numerous outgoings were completed also. Fernando Canesin completed a permanent transfer to Oostende, Nabil Jaadi left the club to join Italian Serie A side Udinese while Jordan Lukaku joined Oostende permanently after a successful loan spell. Four other players also completed permanent moves away from the club, Massimo Bruno to Red Bull Salzburg, Cheikhou Kouyaté to West Ham United, David Pollet to Gent and Dalibor Veselinović to Mechelen. Elis Koulibaly and Youri Lapage were loaned to Eendracht Aalst, the Belgian Second Division side also claimed to have signed Jonathan Kindermans on loan but Anderlecht later confirmed Kindermans was to join Eerste Divisie side Telstar on loan.

Guillaume Gillet also left the club on loan, he joined French Ligue 1 side Bastia on a season-long loan deal on 10 July.

=== July ===
On 20 July, Anderlecht played their first competitive fixture of the season in the 2014 Belgian Super Cup against Lokeren, a match they won 2-1 at their home ground of Constant Vanden Stock Stadium. Aleksandar Mitrović gave Anderlecht the early lead on twenty-nine minutes after a byline pass from Cyriac. Lokeren equalised on seventy-three minutes thanks to a looping header from Tunisian striker Hamdi Harbaoui. As the match was heading for extra time Anderlecht found a ninety first-minute winner, Andy Najar put in a cross which was met by Lokeren's Denis Odoi who put the ball into his own net for an own goal. That won Anderlecht their twelfth Belgian Super Cup triumph.

== Match details ==
League positions are sourced by Statto, while the remaining information is referenced individually.

=== Belgian Pro League ===
==== Regular season ====
===== League table =====
Pos	Team	Pld	W	D	L	GF	GA	GD	Pts	Qualification or relegation
1	Club Brugge	30	17	10	3	69	28	+41	61	Qualification for the Championship play-offs
2	Gent	30	16	9	5	52	29	+23	57	Qualification for the Championship play-offs
3	Anderlecht	30	16	9	5	51	30	+21	57	Qualification for the Championship play-offs
4	Standard Liège	30	16	5	9	49	39	+10	53	Qualification for the Championship play-offs
5	Kortrijk	30	16	3	11	54	35	+19	51	Qualification for the Championship play-offs

Source: Belgian Pro League
Rules for classification: 1) points; 2) number of matches won; if teams are still tied a play-off is organised.

===== Matches =====
Date	League position	Opponents	Venue	Result	Score F–A	Scorers	Attendance	Ref
27 July 2014	2nd	Mouscron-Péruwelz	H	W	3–1	Acheampong 15', Mitrović 75', Suárez 80'	20,000	
1 August 2014	1st	KV Oostende	A	W	2–0	Mitrović 58', Suárez 90+3'	7,000	
10 August 2014	1st	Sporting Charleroi	H	W	1–0	Mitrović 45'	21,000	
17 August 2014	1st	Westerlo	A	D	2–2	Cyriac 50', Tielemans 67' pen.	8,000	
24 August 2014	1st	Waasland-Beveren	H	W	1–0	Kabasele 55'	20,500	
31 August 2014	1st	Club Brugge	A	D	2–2	Defour 7', Mitrović 16'	29,042	
13 September 2014	1st	Lierse	A	D	2–2	Acheampong 50', Cyriac 83'	8,200	
20 September 2014	1st	Cercle Brugge	H	W	3–2	Mitrović 6', Suárez 45', Najar 76'	23,000	
27 September 2014	1st	Zulte-Waregem	A	W	2–0	Suárez 42', Najar 67'	8,500	
5 October 2014	1st	Genk	H	D	0–0		20,000	
18 October 2014	1st	Mechelen	A	D	1–1	Defour 62'	13,400	
26 October 2014	1st	Standard Liège	H	L	0–2		21,000	
29 October 2014	1st	Kortrijk	A	W	3–2	Defour 10' pen., Mitrović 60', Kljestan 85'	9,399	
1 November 2014	1st	Lokeren	H	D	1–1	Cyriac 90+1'	25,361	
9 November 2014	1st	Gent	A	W	2–0	Mitrović 42', Conté 79'	19,999	
22 November 2014	2nd	Sporting Charleroi	A	L	1–3	Mitrović 17'	11,420	
30 November 2014	2nd	Club Brugge	H	D	2–2	Praet 33', Deschacht 55'	21,500	
6 December 2014	3rd	Mouscron-Péruwelz	A	L	2–4	Mbemba 45', Cyriac 81'	8,990	
13 December 2014	2nd	KV Oostende	H	W	3–0	Praet (2) 20', 61', Mitrović 23'	21,000	
20 December 2014	2nd	Waasland-Beveren	A	W	2–0	Defour 29' pen., Praet 90+3'	7,957	
26 December 2014	2nd	Westerlo	H	W	4–0	Mitrović 15', Conté 24, Praet 81', Colin 90+1'	20,521	
18 January 2015	2nd	Lierse	H	W	3–0	Tielemans 23' pen., Dendoncker 45+2', Álvarez 80'	21,000	
25 January 2015	2nd	Standard Liège	A	L	0–2		27,700	
1 February 2015	2nd	Zulte-Waregem	H	D	0–0		19,000	
8 February 2015	2nd	Cercle Brugge	A	W	2–0	Vanden Borre 40', Defour 85'	13,143	
15 February 2015	2nd	Mechelen	H	D	1–1	Mitrović 78'	21,000	
22 February 2015	2nd	Genk	A	W	1–0	Defour 51'	22,075	
1 March 2015	2nd	Kortrijk	H	W	2–0	Mitrović 40', Dendoncker 85'	21,000	
7 March 2015	2nd	Lokeren	A	W	2–1	Tielemans 45+3' pen., Mitrović 87'	10,250	
15 March 2015	3rd	Gent	H	L	1–2	Mitrović 15'	21,000	

=== Championship playoff ===
==== Playoff table ====
Pos	Team	Pld	W	D	L	GF	GA	GD	Pts	Qualification
1	Gent (C)	10	6	2	2	18	11	+7	49	Qualification for the Champions League group stage
2	Club Brugge	10	5	1	4	16	16	0	47	Qualification for the Champions League third qualifying round
3	Anderlecht	10	5	2	3	18	13	+5	46	Qualification for the Europa League group stage (Note: Since winners of the 2014–15 Belgian Cup, Club Brugge, qualified for the Champions League based on league position, the spot awarded to the Cup winner (Europa League group stage) was passed to the third-placed team and the other spots were adjusted accordingly.)
4	Standard Liège	10	4	1	5	14	13	+1	40	Qualification for the Europa League third qualifying round
5	Charleroi	10	3	2	5	13	15	−2	36	Qualification for the Testmatches to Europa League (Note: The team finishing in fifth place, Charleroi, will play the testmatches against the winner of the Belgian Europa League playoff final, for a spot in the Europa League second qualifying round.)
6	Kortrijk	10	2	2	6	11	22	−11	34	

Source: soccerway.com
Rules for classification: 1) points; 2) points after deduction of (possible) half points added due to rounding; 3) number of wins; 4) goal difference; 5) number of goals scored; 6) number of away goals scored; 7) number of away wins.
(C) Champions

==== Matches ====
Date	League position	Opponents	Venue	Result	Score F–A	Scorers	Attendance	Ref
6 April 2015	3rd	Sporting Charleroi	H	W	1–0	Mitrović 63'	21,000	
12 April 2015	3rd	Standard Liège	A	L	1–3	Tielemans 71'	24,062	
19 April 2015	3rd	Club Brugge	A	L	1–2	Mitrović 26'	29,000	
25 April 2015	3rd	Kortrijk	H	W	5–1	Deschacht (2) 17', 24', Tielemans 43', Mitrović 51', Najar 62'	21,000	
30 April 2015	3rd	Gent	A	L	1–2	Tielemans 58'	19,999	
3 May 2015	3rd	Sporting Charleroi	A	W	1–0	Najar 21'	14,662	
10 May 2015	2nd	Club Brugge	H	W	3–1	Najar 1', Mitrović 54', Praet 89'	26,300	
17 May 2015	2nd	Standard Liège	H	D	1–1	Najar 10'	21,000	
21 May 2015	3rd	Kortrijk	A	D	2–2	Praet 49', Mitrović 53'	9,283	
24 May 2015	3rd	Gent	H	W	2–1	Deschacht 21', Mitrović 51'	21,000	

=== Belgian Super Cup ===
Round	Date	Opponents	Venue	Result	Score F–A	Scorers	Attendance	Ref
Final	20 July 2014	Lokeren	H	W	2–1	Mitrović 29', Odoi 90+1' o.g.	13,733	

=== Belgian Cup ===
Round	Date	Opponents	Venue	Result	Score F–A	Scorers	Attendance	Ref
Sixth round	24 September 2014	Patro Eisden	A	W	5–3 (a.e.t.)	Kabasele (2) 5' pen., 20' pen., Mitrović (2) 39', 109', Conté 120+1'	3,100	
Seventh round	3 December 2014	Racing Mechelen	H	W	4–1	Cyriac 15', Kabasele (2) 23', 82', Tielemans 35'	9,000	
QF first leg	17 December 2014	Zulte-Waregem	A	W	3–0	Acheampong 72', Praet 74', Kljestan 86'	4,520	
QF second leg	21 January 2015	Zulte-Waregem	H	W	4–2	Kljestan (2) 25', 44', Cyriac 40', Leya 68'	7,000	
SF first leg	4 February 2015	Gent	A	W	2–0	Najar 33', Vanden Borre 56'	14,473	
SF first leg	12 February 2015	Gent	H	W	3–0	Defour 11', Mitrović 14', Tielemans 57' pen.	9,113	
Final	22 March 2015	Club Brugge	N	L	1–2	Mitrović 89'	45,000	

=== UEFA Champions League ===
Pos	Team	Pld	W	D	L	GF	GA	GD	Pts	Qualification	DOR	ARS	AND	GAL
1	(Germany) Borussia Dortmund	6	4	1	1	14	4	+10	13	Advance to knockout phase	—	2–0	1–1	4–1
2	(England) Arsenal	6	4	1	1	15	8	+7	13	Advance to knockout phase	2–0	—	3–3	4–1
3	(Belgium) Anderlecht	6	1	3	2	8	10	−2	6	Transfer to Europa League	0–3	1–2	—	2–0
4	(Turkey) Galatasaray	6	0	1	5	4	19	−15	1		0–4	1–4	1–1	—

Source: UEFA
Rules for classification: Group stage tiebreakers

Round	Date	Opponents	Venue	Result	Score F–A	Scorers	Attendance	Ref
Group	16 September 2014	Galatasaray	A	D	1–1	Praet 52'	28,553	
Group	1 October 2014	Borussia Dortmund	H	L	0–3		18,649	
Group	22 October 2014	Arsenal	H	L	1–2	Najar 71'	19,881	
Group	4 November 2014	Arsenal	A	D	3–3	Vanden Borre (2) 61', 73' pen., Mitrović 90'	59,872	
Group	26 November 2014	Galatasaray	H	W	2–0	Mbemba (2) 44', 86'	19,857	
Group	9 December 2014	Borussia Dortmund	A	D	1–1	Mitrović 84'	65,851	

=== UEFA Europa League ===
Round	Date	Opponents	Venue	Result	Score F–A	Scorers	Attendance	Ref
Round of 32	19 February 2015	Dynamo Moscow	H	D	0–0		17,317	
Round of 32	26 February 2015	Dynamo Moscow	A	L	1–3	Mitrović 28'	12,316	

== Appearances and goals ==
Numbers in parentheses denote appearances as substitute.
Players with names struck through and marked † left the club during the playing season.
Players with names in italics and marked * were on loan from another club for the whole of their season with Anderlecht.
Players listed with no appearances have been in the matchday squad but only as unused substitutes.
Key to positions: GK – Goalkeeper; DF – Defender; MF – Midfielder; FW – Forward

No.	Pos.	Nat.	Name	League		Belgian Cup		Super Cup		UEFA CL		UEFA EL		Total		Discipline	
No.	Pos.	Nat.	Name	Apps	Goals	Apps	Goals	Apps	Goals	Apps	Goals	Apps	Goals	Apps	Goals	A yellow rectangle, denoting the yellow penalty card shown to a player being cautioned	A red rectangle, denoting the red penalty card shown to a player being sent off
1	GK	BEL	Silvio Proto	36	0	4	0	0	0	5	0	2	0	47	0	1	0
2	DF	COD	Fabrice N'Sakala	23	0	5	0	1	0	1	0	2	0	32	0	6	0
3	DF	BEL	Olivier Deschacht	40	4	7	0	1	0	6	0	2	0	56	4	7	0
7	MF	HON	Andy Najar	34 (1)	6	4 (1)	1	0 (1)	0	5	1	1 (1)	0	44 (4)	8	7	0
8	MF	SRB	~~Luka Milivojević~~ †	3	0	0	0	1	0	0	0	0	0	4	0	0	0
8	MF	GUI	Idrissa Sylla	0	0	0	0	0	0	0	0	0	0	0	0	0	0
9	FW	ARG	Matías Suárez	6 (7)	4	0 (1)	0	0 (1)	0	1 (2)	0	0	0	7 (11)	4	2	0
10	MF	BEL	Dennis Praet	28 (1)	7	2	1	1	0	6	1	0	0	37 (1)	9	2	0
11	MF	GER	Marko Marin *	5 (1)	0	2	0	0	0	0	0	0	0	7 (1)	0	0	0
12	DF	FRA	Maxime Colin	12 (5)	1	6	0	0	0	0	0	0 (1)	0	18 (6)	1	4	0
13	GK	BEL	~~Thomas Kaminski~~ †	2	0	0	0	1	0	0	0	0	0	3	0	0	0
13	DF	POR	Rolando *	5 (1)	0	1 (1)	0	0	0	0	0	2	0	8 (2)	0	0	1
14	DF	NED	Bram Nuytinck	9 (2)	0	0 (1)	0	1	0	2	0	0	0	12 (3)	0	2	0
15	FW	CIV	Gohi Bi Cyriac	9 (20)	4	3 (3)	2	1	0	2 (3)	0	0 (1)	0	15 (27)	6	2	0
16	MF	BEL	Steven Defour	29	6	4	1	0	0	4	0	2	0	39	7	9	1
17	FW	COL	Oswal Álvarez	2 (3)	1	0 (1)	0	0	0	0	0	0	0	2 (4)	1	0	0
18	FW	GHA	Frank Acheampong	22 (13)	2	3 (1)	1	1	0	5 (1)	0	2	0	33 (15)	3	5	0
19	MF	USA	~~Sacha Kljestan~~ †	5 (8)	1	3 (1)	3	0	0	2 (2)	0	0	0	10 (11)	4	3	0
20	MF	GUI	Ibrahima Conté	14 (10)	2	2 (3)	1	0	0	6	0	1	0	23 (13)	3	3	0
22	DF	COD	Chancel Mbemba	28	1	2	0	1	0	6	2	0	0	37	3	6	1
24	DF	BEL	Michaël Heylen	12 (2)	0	4	0	0	0	0 (1)	0	0	0	16 (3)	0	1	0
26	GK	COD	Mulopo Kudimbana	0	0	0	0	0	0	0	0	0	0	0	0	0	0
29	MF	ESP	Fede Vico	0	0	0	0	0	0	0	0	0	0	0	0	0	0
31	MF	BEL	Youri Tielemans	34 (5)	6	3 (1)	2	1	0	5 (1)	0	2	0	46 (6)	8	4	0
32	MF	BEL	Leander Dendoncker	17 (9)	2	6	0	0	0	1 (3)	0	2	0	26 (12)	2	2	1
33	GK	BEL	Davy Roef	2	0	3	0	0	0	1	0	0	0	6	0	0	0
34	MF	BEL	Samuel Bastien	0 (1)	0	0 (1)	0	0	0	0	0	0	0	0 (2)	0	0	0
35	FW	BEL	Aaron Leya Iseka	1 (8)	0	0 (4)	1	0	0	0	0	0 (2)	0	1 (14)	1	2	0
37	DF	BEL	Hervé Matthys	0	0	0 (1)	0	0	0	0	0	0	0	0 (1)	0	0	0
38	FW	BEL	Andy Kawaya	0 (7)	0	2	0	0	0	0 (2)	0	0	0	2 (9)	0	0	0
39	DF	BEL	Anthony Vanden Borre	20	1	3	1	0	0	4	2	2	0	29	4	11	0
40	MF	BRA	~~Wigor *~~ †	0	0	0	0	0	0	0	0	0	0	0	0	0	0
40	DF	BEL	Nathan de Medina	0	0	0	0	0	0	0	0	0	0	0	0	0	0
41	MF	BEL	Mehdi Tarfi	0	0	0	0	0	0	0	0	0	0	0	0	0	0
42	FW	BEL	Nathan Kabasele	5 (7)	1	2 (1)	4	0 (1)	0	0 (1)	0	0 (1)	0	7 (11)	5	0	0
45	FW	SRB	Aleksandar Mitrović	36 (1)	20	6	4	1	1	4 (1)	2	2	1	49 (2)	28	11	0

== Club ==
=== Coaching staff ===
Position	Staff
Manager	(Albania) (Kosovo) Besnik Hasi
Assistant manager	(Belgium) Geert Emmerechts
Team manager	(Belgium) Gunter Van Handenhoven
Goalkeeping coach	(Netherlands) Max de Jong
Club doctors	(Belgium) Geert Declercq; Peter Wieme
Physical trainer	(Belgium) Jurgen Seegers

Last updated: 14 July 2014
Source: R.S.C. Anderlecht Staff

=== Other information ===
Chairman	(Belgium) Roger Vanden Stock
Ground (capacity and dimensions)	Constant Vanden Stock Stadium (28,063 / 105 x 68 metres)

Updated to match played 14 July 2014
Source: R.S.C. Anderlecht Stadium History

== Transfers ==
=== Transfers in ===
#	Position:	Player	Transferred from	Fee	Date	Source
26	GK	(Democratic Republic of the Congo) Mulopo Kudimbana	(Belgium) Oostende	Undisclosed	June 2014	
40	MF	(Brazil) Wigor	(Brazil) Capivariano	Undisclosed	20 June 2014	

=== Loans in ===
#	Position	Player	Loaned from	Date	Loan expires	Team	Source

Total spending: ▼ Undisclosed

=== Transfers out ===
#	Position	Player	Transferred to	Fee	Date	Source
34	MF	(Morocco) Nabil Jaadi	(Italy) Udinese	Undisclosed	10 May 2014	
37	DF	(Belgium) Jordan Lukaku	(Belgium) Oostende	Undisclosed	25 May 2014	
	FW	(Serbia) Dalibor Veselinović	(Belgium) Mechelen	Undisclosed	7 June 2014	
17	MF	(Belgium) Massimo Bruno	(Austria) Red Bull Salzburg	Undisclosed	12 June 2014	
55	MF	(Brazil) Fernando Canesin	(Belgium) Oostende	Undisclosed	16 June 2014	
16	MF	(Senegal) Cheikhou Kouyaté	(England) West Ham United	Undisclosed	18 June 2014	
11	FW	(Belgium) David Pollet	(Belgium) Gent	Undisclosed	30 June 2014	
36	FW	(Belgium) David Henen	(England) Everton F.C.	Undisclosed (~£1.5)	2 August 2014	

=== Loans out ===
#	Position	Player	Loaned to	Date	Loan expires	Source
	FW	(Burkina Faso) Elis Koulibaly	(Belgium) Eendracht Aalst	22 May 2014	End of season	
	FW	(Belgium) Youri Lapage	(Belgium) Eendracht Aalst	22 May 2014	End of season	
	FW	(Belgium) Jonathan Kindermans	(Netherlands) Telstar	26 June 2014	End of season	
30	DF	(Belgium) Guillaume Gillet	(France) Bastia	10 July 2014	End of season	

Total income: ▲ Undisclosed
