= 2015–16 RSC Anderlecht season =

Anderlecht
2015–16 season
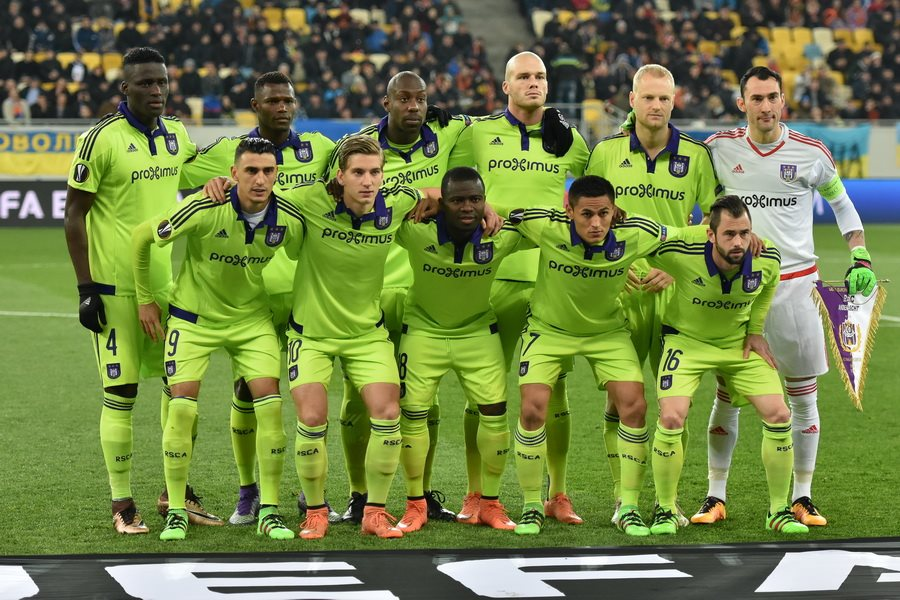
- Chairman: Roger Vanden Stock
- Manager: Besnik Hasi
- Ground: Constant Vanden Stock Stadium
- Belgian Pro League: 3rd
- Belgian Cup: Seventh round
- UEFA Europa League: Round of 16
- Top goalscorer: League: Stefano Okaka (15); All: Stefano Okaka (17)
- Highest home attendance: 26,000 vs Club Brugge, Belgian Pro League, 25 October 2015 & 17 April 2016
- Lowest home attendance: 6,000 vs Spouwen-Mopertingen, Belgian Cup, 23 September 2015
Home colours	Away colours	Third colours

The 2015–16 season is a season played by Anderlecht, a Belgian football club based in Anderlecht, Brussels. The season covers the period from 1 July 2015 to 30 June 2016. Anderlecht will be participating in the Belgian Pro League, Belgian Cup and the UEFA Europa League.

== Match details ==
League positions are sourced by Statto, while the remaining information is referenced individually.

=== Belgian Pro League ===
==== Regular season ====
Pos	Team	Pld	W	D	L	GF	GA	GD	Pts	Qualification or relegation
1	Club Brugge	30	21	1	8	64	30	+34	64	Qualification for the Championship play-offs
2	Gent	30	17	9	4	56	29	+27	60	Qualification for the Championship play-offs
3	Anderlecht	30	15	10	5	51	29	+22	55	Qualification for the Championship play-offs
4	Oostende	30	14	7	9	55	44	+11	49	Qualification for the Championship play-offs
5	Genk	30	14	6	10	42	30	+12	48	Qualification for the Championship play-offs

Source: Belgian Pro League, Soccerway
Rules for classification: 1) Points; 2) Matches won; 3) Goal difference; 4) Goals scored; 5) Away goals scored; 6) Away matches won; 7) Play-off.

Date	League position	Opponents	Venue	Result	Score F–A	Scorers	Attendance	Ref
26 July 2015	4th	Waasland-Beveren	H	W	3–2	Gillet 3', Sylla 35', Tielemans 90+2'	18,700	
2 August 2015	1st	OH Leuven	A	W	2–0	Sylla 69', Tielemans 75'	8,000	
9 August 2015	1st	Gent	H	D	1–1	Sylla 12'	23,000	
16 August 2015	6th	KV Oostende	A	L	1–3	Milić 48' o.g.	7,200	
23 August 2015	3rd	Lokeren	H	W	1–0	Praet 90+1'	21,000	
30 August 2015	1st	Westerlo	A	W	3–0	Okaka 19', Tielemans 53', Praet 70'	8,000	
13 September 2015	2nd	Genk	H	D	0–0		21,000	
20 September 2015	2nd	Sporting Charleroi	A	D	1–1	Okaka 59'	11,592	
27 September 2015	2nd	Sint-Truiden	H	W	1–0	Okaka 32'	20,300	
4 October 2015	3rd	Mechelen	H	D	1–1	Okaka 55'	19,550	
18 October 2015	3rd	Zulte-Waregem	A	W	4–0	Okaka (2) 14', 52', Defour 45+3' pen., Dendoncker 86'	9,550	
25 October 2015	1st	Club Brugge	H	W	3–1	Okaka 12', Ezekiel 47', Praet 57'	26,000	
29 October 2015	3rd	Kortrijk	A	D	1–1	Ezekiel 51'	9,198	
1 November 2015	2nd	Mouscron-Péruwelz	H	W	2–0	Najar (2) 52', 90+3'	21,000	
8 November 2015	3rd	Standard Liège	A	L	0–1		27,735	
29 November 2015	4th	OH Leuven	H	W	3–2	Suárez 31', Sylla (2) 39', 69'	16,500	
6 December 2015	4th	Genk	A	D	0–0		17,675	
13 December 2015	4th	KV Oostende	H	D	1–1	Suárez 47'	20,000	
20 December 2015	4th	Club Brugge	A	W	4–1	Okaka 6', Praet (2) 35', 90+3', Suárez 79' pen.	27,065	
23 December 2015	3rd	Lokeren	A	D	1–1	Gillet 90+2'	10,683	
27 December 2015	2nd	Westerlo	H	W	2–1	Okaka 45+1', Gillet 59' pen.	21,000	
17 January 2016	3rd	Gent	A	L	0–2		19,999	
25 January 2016	3rd	Sporting Charleroi	H	W	2–1	Baby 3' o.g., Okaka 54'	20,000	
29 January 2016	2nd	Sint Truiden	A	W	2–1	Tielemans 2' pen., Sylla 84'	12,101	
5 February 2016	3rd	Mechelen	A	D	2–2	Acheampong (2) 18', 70'	10,973	
13 February 2016	3rd	Zulte-Waregem	H	W	3–0	Acheampong 30', Büttner 60', Suárez 90+1'	21,000	
21 February 2016	3rd	Waasland-Beveren	A	L	0–1		7,900	
28 February 2016	3rd	Standard Liège	H	D	3–3	Suárez 13', Okaka 55', Lukebakio 74'	20,000	
5 March 2016	3rd	Mouscron-Péruwelz	A	L	1–2	Okaka 43'	8,000	
13 March 2016	3rd	Kortrijk	H	W	3–0	Okaka 6', Acheampong 49', Mbodji 60'	19,500	

==== Championship play-offs ====
Pos	Team	Pld	W	D	L	GF	GA	GD	Pts	Qualification	CLU	AND	GNT	GNK	OOS	ZWA
1	Club Brugge (C)	10	7	1	2	25	9	+16	54	Qualification for the Champions League group stage	—	4–0	2–0	3–1	2–2	5–0
2	Anderlecht	10	6	1	3	15	16	−1	47	Qualification for the Champions League third qualifying round	1–0	—	2–0	1–0	2–1	2–0
3	Gent	10	3	3	4	10	15	−5	42	Qualification for the Europa League third qualifying round	1–4	1–1	—	0–0	2–0	1–1
4	Genk (O)	10	5	1	4	20	13	+7	40	Qualification for the play-off final	4–2	5–2	1–2	—	4–0	2–0
5	Oostende	10	3	2	5	14	19	−5	36		0–1	4–2	0–1	2–1	—	3–3
6	Zulte Waregem	10	1	2	7	11	23	−12	27		0–2	1–2	4–2	1–2	1–2	—

Source: Belgian Pro League, Soccerway
Rules for classification: 1) Points; 2) Points without (possible) half points added due to rounding; 3) Matches won; 4) Goal difference; 5) Goals scored; 6) Away goals scored; 7) Away matches won; 8) Play-off.
(C) Champions; (O) Play-off winners

Date	League position	Opponents	Venue	Result	Score F–A	Scorers	Attendance	Ref
3 April 2016	2nd	Genk	H	W	1–0	Bizot 65' o.g.	21,500	
10 April 2016	2nd	Zulte-Waregem	A	W	2–1	Praet 54', Okaka 87'	9,540	
17 April 2016	2nd	Club Brugge	H	W	1–0	Tielemans 61'	26,000	
21 April 2016	1st	Gent	A	D	1–1	Nuytinck 64'	19,999	
24 April 2016	2nd	KV Oostende	A	L	2–4	Defour 77', Sylla 90'	5,000	
1 May 2016	2nd	Gent	H	W	2–0	Mbodji 38', Acheampong 87'	20,000	
8 May 2016	2nd	KV Oostende	H	W	2–1	Tielemans 53' pen., Okaka 90+4'	20,000	
15 May 2016	2nd	Club Brugge	A	L	0–4		27,695	
19 May 2016	2nd	Genk	A	L	2–5	Đuričić 25', Suárez 60'	19,159	
22 May 2016	2nd	Zulte-Waregem	H	W	2–0	Nuytinck 31', Praet 72'	19,500	

=== Belgian Cup ===
Round	Date	Opponents	Venue	Result	Score F–A	Scorers	Attendance	Ref
Sixth round	23 September 2015	Spouwen-Mopertingen	H	W	3–1	Tielemans 65' pen., Dendoncker 89', Suárez 90+2'	6,000	
Seventh round	2 December 2015	Kortrijk	A	L	2–4	Ezekiel 33', Defour 63'	4,047	

=== UEFA Europa League ===
==== Group stage ====
Pos	Team	Pld	W	D	L	GF	GA	GD	Pts	Qualification	TOT	AND	MON	QAR
1	(England) Tottenham Hotspur	6	4	1	1	12	6	+6	13	Advance to knockout phase	—	2–1	4–1	3–1
2	(Belgium) Anderlecht	6	3	1	2	8	6	+2	10	Advance to knockout phase	2–1	—	1–1	2–1
3	(France) Monaco	6	1	3	2	5	9	−4	6		1–1	0–2	—	1–0
4	(Azerbaijan) Qarabağ	6	1	1	4	4	8	−4	4		0–1	1–0	1–1	—

Source: Soccerway
Rules for classification: Group stage tiebreakers

Round	Date	Opponents	Venue	Result	Score F–A	Scorers	Attendance	Ref
Group	17 September 2015	Monaco	H	D	1–1	Gillet 11'	15,576	
Group	1 October 2015	Qarabağ	A	L	0–1		25,000	
Group	22 October 2015	Tottenham Hotspur	H	W	2–1	Gillet 13', Okaka 75'	18,504	
Group	5 November 2015	Tottenham Hotspur	A	L	1–2	Ezekiel 72'	33,479	
Group	26 November 2015	Monaco	A	W	2–0	Gillet 45+1', Acheampong 78'	5,913	
Group	10 December 2015	Qarabağ	H	W	2–1	Najar 28', Okaka 31'	16,075	

==== Knockout stage ====
Round	Date	Opponents	Venue	Result	Score F–A	Scorers	Attendance	Ref
Round of 32	18 February 2016	Olympiakos Piraeus	H	W	1–0	Mbodji 67'	15,397	
Round of 32	25 February 2016	Olympiakos Piraeus	A	W	2–1 (a.e.t.)	Acheampong (2) 103', 111'	31,005	
Round of 16	10 March 2016	Shakhtar Donetsk	A	L	1–3	Acheampong 68'	23,621	
Round of 16	17 March 2016	Shakhtar Donetsk	H	L	0–1		13,785	

== Appearances and goals ==
Numbers in parentheses denote appearances as substitute.
Players with names struck through and marked † left the club during the playing season.
Players with names in italics and marked * were on loan from another club for the whole of their season with Anderlecht.
Players listed with no appearances have been in the matchday squad but only as unused substitutes.
Key to positions: GK – Goalkeeper; DF – Defender; MF – Midfielder; FW – Forward

No.	Pos.	Nat.	Name	League		Belgian Cup		UEFA EL		Total		Discipline	
No.	Pos.	Nat.	Name	Apps	Goals	Apps	Goals	Apps	Goals	Apps	Goals	A yellow rectangle, denoting the yellow penalty card shown to a player being cautioned	A red rectangle, denoting the red penalty card shown to a player being sent off
1	GK	BEL	Silvio Proto	40	0	0	0	10	0	50	0	2	0
2	DF	FRA	~~Maxime Colin~~ †	0 (1)	0	0	0	0	0	0 (1)	0	0	0
2	DF	BRA	Rafael Galhardo	1	0	0	0	0	0	1	0	0	0
3	DF	BEL	Olivier Deschacht	28 (4)	0	1	0	10	0	39 (4)	0	7	0
4	DF	SEN	Kara Mbodji	32	2	0	0	9	1	41	3	10	2
7	MF	HON	Andy Najar	24 (3)	2	1 (1)	0	9	1	34 (4)	3	8	0
8	MF	SEN	Stéphane Badji	13 (1)	0	0	0	4	0	17 (1)	0	4	1
9	FW	ARG	Matías Suárez	18 (9)	6	0 (2)	1	3 (4)	0	21 (15)	7	3	0
10	MF	BEL	Dennis Praet	36 (1)	7	0	0	9	0	45 (1)	7	8	1
11	FW	BEL	~~Nathan Kabasele~~ †	0	0	0	0	0	0	0	0	0	0
11	MF	SER	Filip Đuričić *	11 (6)	1	0	0	2 (1)	0	13 (7)	1	1	0
13	GK	BEL	Thomas Kaminski	0	0	0	0	0	0	0	0	0	0
14	DF	NED	Bram Nuytinck	13 (5)	2	2	0	2 (2)	0	17 (7)	2	4	0
16	MF	BEL	Steven Defour	32	2	1	1	8 (1)	0	41 (1)	3	15	0
17	MF	GUI	Ibrahima Conté	4 (1)	0	2	0	0 (3)	0	6 (4)	0	0	0
18	FW	GHA	Frank Acheampong	21 (7)	5	1	0	5 (4)	4	27 (11)	9	2	0
19	FW	COL	Oswal Álvarez	0	0	0	0	0	0	0	0	0	0
21	DF	COD	Fabrice N'Sakala	5 (1)	0	1	0	3	0	9 (1)	0	6	0
22	DF	COD	~~Chancel Mbemba~~ †	0	0	0	0	0	0	0	0	0	0
23	GK	BEL	Frank Boeckx	0	0	0	0	0	0	0	0	0	0
24	DF	BEL	Michaël Heylen	6 (2)	0	1	0	0 (1)	0	7 (3)	0	1	0
26	FW	GUI	Idrissa Sylla	10 (20)	7	0 (1)	0	0 (4)	0	10 (25)	7	0	0
27	MF	EGY	Trezeguet *	1 (6)	0	0	0	0 (1)	0	1 (7)	0	0	0
28	DF	NED	Alexander Büttner *	14	1	0	0	2	0	16	1	4	0
30	MF	BEL	~~Guillaume Gillet~~ †	18	3	2	0	6	3	26	6	3	0
31	MF	BEL	Youri Tielemans	29 (5)	6	2	1	5 (4)	0	36 (9)	7	6	0
32	MF	BEL	Leander Dendoncker	23 (1)	1	1	1	6	0	30 (1)	2	5	0
33	GK	BEL	Davy Roef	0	0	2	0	0	0	2	0	0	0
34	MF	BEL	Samuel Bastien	0	0	0	0	0	0	0	0	0	0
35	FW	BEL	Aaron Leya Iseka	0 (3)	0	1	0	0	0	1 (3)	0	0	0
36	DF	BEL	Nathan de Medina	2	0	0	0	0	0	2	0	0	0
37	DF	SRB	Ivan Obradović	13	0	0	0	3	0	16	0	1	0
38	FW	BEL	Andy Kawaya	0 (2)	0	1 (1)	0	0 (1)	0	1 (4)	0	1	0
39	DF	BEL	Anthony Vanden Borre	2	0	0	0	0	0	2	0	0	0
44	DF	BEL	Hervé Matthys	0	0	0	0	0	0	0	0	0	0
46	MF	COD	Dodi Lukebakio	3 (14)	1	0	0	0 (1)	0	3 (15)	1	2	0
50	GK	IRL	Liam Bossin	0	0	0	0	0	0	0	0	0	0
93	FW	NGA	Imoh Ezekiel *	11 (9)	2	2	1	4 (3)	1	17 (12)	4	2	0
99	FW	ITA	Stefano Okaka	30 (7)	15	1 (1)	0	10	2	41 (8)	17	5	1
