= Zé Vitor (footballer, born 2002) =

Brazilian footballer (born 2002)

Personal information
- Full name: José Vitor Geminiano Cavalieri
- Date of birth: 10 June 2002 (age 24)
- Place of birth: Colorado, Brazil
- Height: 1.92 m (6 ft 4 in)
- Position: Centre-back

Team information
- Current team: Ferroviária (on loan from União de Leiria)

Youth career
- PSTC
- São Paulo
- Paraná
- 2020–2022: Vasco da Gama

Senior career*
Years	Team	Apps	(Gls)
2022–2024	Vasco da Gama	14	(0)
2024	→ Volta Redonda (loan)	12	(0)
2024–	União de Leiria	18	(0)
2026–	→ Ferroviária (loan)	23	(1)
- * Club domestic league appearances and goals as of 9 November 2026

José Vitor Geminiano Cavalieri (born 10 June 2002), known as Zé Vitor, is a Brazilian professional footballer who plays as a centre-back for Campeonato Brasileiro Série B club Ferroviária, on loan from Liga Portugal 2 side União de Leiria.

== Club career ==
Born in Colorado, Paraná, Zé Vitor progressed through the academies of PSTC, São Paulo and Paraná. He joined Vasco da Gama in 2020 from Paraná. Only one year later, he renewed his contract with the club. He made his professional debut with the club during the 2022 season.

In January 2023, he again renewed his contract with Vasco da Gama.

On 1 August 2024, Zé Vitor signed a three-year contract with União de Leiria in Portugal.

On 20 January 2026, he returned to Brazil, on loan to Série B club Ferroviária until the end of the year.

== Career statistics ==
=== Club ===
As of 4 March 2023

Appearances and goals by club, season and competition
Club	Season	League			State league		National cup		Continental		Other		Total	
Club	Season	Division	Apps	Goals	Apps	Goals	Apps	Goals	Apps	Goals	Apps	Goals	Apps	Goals
Vasco da Gama	2022	Série B	4	0	1 (Note: Appearances in the Campeonato Carioca)	0	0	0	—		0	0	5	0
Vasco da Gama	2023	Série A	0	0	2	0	0	0	—		0	0	2	0
Career total			4	0	3	0	0	0	0	0	0	0	7	0
