= Fernando Da Cruz =

French futsal player and football manager (born 1972)

Personal information
- Full name: Fernando Da Cruz
- Date of birth: 25 October 1972 (age 54)
- Place of birth: Villeneuve-d'Ascq, France
- Position: Midfielder

International career
Years	Team	Apps	(Gls)
1998–2006	France Futsal	55	

Managerial career
- 2006–2008: Wasquehal (assistant manager)
- 2012–2014: Mouscron (assistant manager)
- 2014–2015: Mouscron
- 2018–2020: Lille
- 2020: Mouscron
- 2022–2023: AS FAR
- 2026-: Kaizer Chiefs

Fernando Da Cruz (born 25 October 1972) is a French professional football manager, and former futsal player who represented the France national futsal team.

== Playing career ==
Da Cruz was an amateur footballer, but was called up to represent the France national futsal team in 1998 at the age of 26, and later became their captain.

== Coaching career ==
Da Cruz began his managerial career as assistant coach with Wasquehal in Belgium, and has stints coaching the youth with Lille OSC and Royal Excel Mouscron. On 29 December 2014, he was named temporary manager of Mouscron after the sacking of Rachid Chihab. On 31 January 2016, Da Cruz left Mouscron to work as a scout with Lille OSC.

Da Cruz became manager of the Lille team from 2018 to 2020. On 27 July 2020, he was again named manager of Mouscron.

On 17 June 2026, Da Cruz was appointed as the head coach of Kaizer Chiefs.

== Personal life ==
Born in France, Da Cruz is of Portuguese descent.
