= Andy Kawaya =

Belgian footballer

Personal information
- Full name: Andy Awazi A. Kawaya Kinghi Mwana Mufula
- Date of birth: 23 August 1996 (age 30)
- Place of birth: Brussels, Belgium
- Height: 1.73 m (5 ft 8 in)
- Position: Winger

Youth career
- –2013: Anderlecht

Senior career*
Years	Team	Apps	(Gls)
2013–2017	Anderlecht	9	(0)
2016	→ Willem II (loan)	8	(4)
2017–2018	KV Mechelen	12	(0)
2018	Avellino	0	(0)
2019–2021	Cultural Leonesa	45	(7)
2021–2022	Cartagena	3	(0)
2022–2023	Albacete	13	(2)

International career
2011	Belgium U15	2	(0)
2011–2012	Belgium U16	3	(2)
2012	Belgium U17	4	(0)
2013	Belgium U18	1	(1)
2014	Belgium U19	3	(2)
2015	Belgium U21	1	(0)
- * Club domestic league appearances and goals as of 18 December 2023

Andy Awazi A. Kawaya Kinghi Mwana Mufula (born 23 August 1996), known as Andy Kawaya, is a Belgian footballer who plays as a left winger at the Cultural y Deportiva Leonesa

== Club career ==
Kawaya is a youth exponent from Anderlecht. He made his first team debut at 25 September 2013 in the Belgian Cup against K.A.S. Eupen. At 4 November 2014, he made his UEFA Champions League debut against Arsenal. After making 28 appearances and scoring 4 goals in all competitions for Anderlecht, Kawaya moved out on loan on 7 January 2016 to join Eredivisie side Willem II for the rest of the 2015–16 season.

On 29 January 2019, Kawaya signed a contract for the rest of the season with Spanish club Cultural Leonesa. On 17 June 2021, he moved to Segunda División side FC Cartagena on a two-year deal, but terminated his contract the following 31 January after appearing rarely.

On 31 January 2022, Kawaya signed a two-and-a-half-year contract with Albacete Balompié in Primera División RFEF. After helping the club in their promotion to the second division, he terminated his contract exactly one year later.

== Career statistics ==
=== Club ===
As of match played 6 march 2021

Appearances and goals by club, season and competition
Club	Season	League			National Cup		Continental		Other		Total	
Club	Season	Division	Apps	Goals	Apps	Goals	Apps	Goals	Apps	Goals	Apps	Goals
Anderlecht	2013–14	Belgian Pro League	0	0	1	0	0	0	—		1	0
Anderlecht	2014–15	Belgian Pro League	7	0	2	0	2 (Note: Appearance(s) in UEFA Champions League)	0	0	0	11	0
Anderlecht	2015–16	Belgian Pro League	2	0	2	0	1 (Note: Appearance(s) in UEFA Europa League)	0	—		5	0
Anderlecht	Total		9	0	5	0	3	0	0	0	17	0
Willem II (loan)	2015–16	Eredivisie	8	0	0	0	—		—		8	0
KV Mechelen	2017–18	Belgian First Division A	12	0	1	0	—		—		13	0
Cultural Leonesa	2018–19	Segunda División B	6	1	—		—		—		6	1
Cultural Leonesa	2019–20	Segunda División B	25	5	2	1	—		1 (Note: Appearance(s) in Promotion Playoffs)	0	28	6
Cultural Leonesa	2020–21	Segunda División B	11	1	1	0	—		—		12	1
Cultural Leonesa	Total		42	7	3	1	0	0	1	0	46	8
Career total			71	7	9	1	3	0	1	0	84	8

== Honours ==
Kawaya won his first honour in his career when he and Anderlecht won the 2013–14 Belgian Pro League. His second honour came in the subsequent 2014 Belgian Super Cup.

=== Collective ===
Anderlecht

- Belgian Pro League (1): 2013–14
- Belgian Super Cup (1): 2014
