= Jerry Vandam =

French footballer (born 1988)

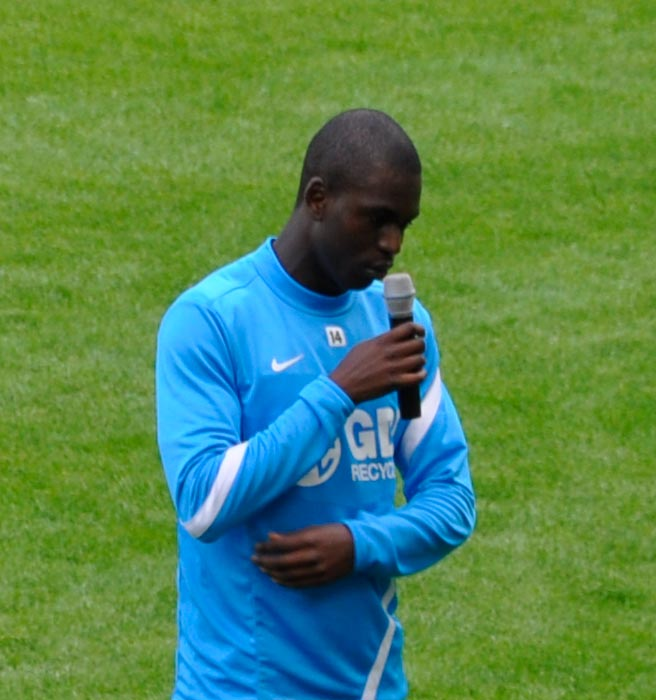
- Vandam in 2011

Personal information
- Full name: Jerry Boachie Van Dam
- Date of birth: 8 December 1988 (age 37)
- Place of birth: Lille, France
- Height: 1.86 m (6 ft 1 in)
- Position: Right-back

Team information
- Current team: IC Croix
- Number: 14

Youth career
- 2003–2007: Lille

Senior career*
Years	Team	Apps	(Gls)
2007–2013	Lille	12	(0)
2010–2013	Lille B	27	(2)
2011–2012	→ Caen (loan)	36	(1)
2013–2015	Mechelen	37	(0)
2015	Waasland-Beveren	6	(0)
2016	Ischia Isolaverde	5	(0)
2017	Dunkerque	4	(0)
2017–2020	Le Puy	71	(2)
2020–2022	Grande-Synthe		
2022–	IC Croix	18	(2)
- * Club domestic league appearances and goals as of 1 July 2023

Jerry Boachie Van Dam (born 8 December 1988), commonly referred to as Jerry Vandam, is a French professional footballer who plays as a right-back for Championnat National 3 club IC Croix.

== Club career ==
=== Lille ===
Vandam signed for Lille in 2003, playing for youth teams until 2007. He began his professional career at the club, making his Ligue 1 debut in a 3–1 win over Rennes on 16 February 2008, where he came on as a substitute in the 81st minute for Nicolas Plestan.

==== Loan to Caen ====
Vandam agreed to join Caen on loan from Lille for 2011–12 Ligue 1 season. He made 36 appearances out of Caen's 38 league matches, scoring one goal. Vandam made his debut for Caen in a 1–0 win over Valenciennes on 6 August 2011, at the Stade Michel d'Ornano. He scored his first goal for the club in the 82nd minute following an assist by Frédéric Bulot in a 4–2 loss to Paris Saint-Germain on 29 October 2011, at the Parc des Princes. Caen were eventually relegated in 18th position, three points shy from safety in Ligue 1.

=== Mechelen ===
On 27 January 2013, Vandam joined Belgian Pro League club Mechelen on a 3-year contract until 30 June 2016.

== International career ==
Vandam was born in Lille, France, to Ghanaian parents, and holds dual nationality. In September 2010, he expressed his desire to play for Ghana.

== Career statistics ==
As of match played 6 March 2020

Appearances by club, season and competition
Club	Season	League			National cup		League cup		Other		Total	
Club	Season	Division	Apps	Goals	Apps	Goals	Apps	Goals	Apps	Goals	Apps	Goals
Lille	2007–08	Ligue 1	1	0	0	0	0	0	0	0	1	0
Lille	2008–09	Ligue 1	2	0	2	0	0	0	0	0	4	0
Lille	2009–10	Ligue 1	8	0	0	0	1	0	7 (Note: Appearances in the Europa League)	0	16	0
Lille	2010–11	Ligue 1	2	0	0	0	0	0	4	0	6	0
Lille	2012–13	Ligue 1	0	0	0	0	0	0	0	0	0	0
Lille	Total		13	0	2	0	1	0	11	0	27	0
Lille B	2010–11	CFA	13	1	—		—		—		13	1
Lille B	2012–13	CFA	14	1	—		—		—		14	1
Lille B	Total		27	2	—		—		—		27	2
Caen (loan)	2011–12	Ligue 1	36	1	1	0	2	0	0	0	39	1
Mechelen	2012–13	Pro League	5	0	0	0	—		1 (Note: Appearance in the Pro League Europa League play-offs)	0	6	0
Mechelen	2013–14	Pro League	28	0	2	0	—		0	0	30	0
Mechelen	2014–15	Pro League	4	0	1	0	—		0	0	5	0
Mechelen	Total		37	0	3	0	—		1	0	41	0
Waasland-Beveren	2014–15	Pro League	6	0	0	0	—		0	0	6	0
Ischia	2015–16	Lega Pro	5	0	0	0	—		0	0	5	0
Dunkerque	2016–17	National	4	0	0	0	—		—		4	0
Le Puy	2017–18	National 2	18	0	1	0	—		—		19	0
Le Puy	2018–19	National 2	29	1	2	1	—		—		31	2
Le Puy	2019–20	National	24	1	3	0	—		—		27	1
Le Puy	Total		71	2	6	1	—		—		75	2
Career total			199	5	12	1	3	0	12	0	226	6
