= Wigor (footballer) =

Brazilian footballer (born 1995)

Personal information
- Full name: Wigor Alan do Nascimento
- Date of birth: 7 January 1995 (age 31)
- Place of birth: Colorado, Brazil
- Height: 1.82 m (5 ft 11 1/2 in)
- Position: Defensive midfielder

Youth career
- 2010–2012: Ranchariense
- 2011: → ECUS (loan)
- 2013: Votuporanguense
- 2014: Capivariano

Senior career*
Years	Team	Apps	(Gls)
2014–2016	Capivariano	30	(0)
2014	→ Anderlecht (loan)	0	(0)
2015	→ Bragantino (loan)	16	(0)
2016	CRB	5	(0)
2017	Ashdod	0	(0)
2017	Santos	0	(0)
2019–2020	Real Ariquemes	12	(2)
- * Club domestic league appearances and goals as of 16:01, 28 December 2022 (UTC)

Wigor Alan do Nascimento (born 7 January 1995), simply known as Wigor, is a Brazilian footballer who plays as a defensive midfielder.

== Club career ==
Born in Colorado, Paraná, Wigor started his career with Ranchariense, and graduated with Capivariano. After making his senior debuts in 2014 in Campeonato Paulista Série A2, he went on a trial at Anderlecht on 20 June of that year, and signed a short-term deal shortly after.

Assigned the no. 40 shirt, Wigor made no appearances for the side and was released in January 2015. He subsequently returned to Capivariano, appearing with the side in Campeonato Paulista.

On 30 April 2015 Wigor was loaned to Série B side Bragantino, until the end of the year. He made his debut for the club on 16 May, coming on as a second-half substitute in a 1–0 home win against Paysandu.

On 30 January 2017, Wigor joined Israeli Premier League side F.C. Ashdod until the end of the season. He returned after making no league appearances, and subsequently joined Santos' B-team.

== Career statistics ==
As of 3 November 2020

Club	Season	League			State League		Cup		Continental		Other		Total	
Club	Season	Division	Apps	Goals	Apps	Goals	Apps	Goals	Apps	Goals	Apps	Goals	Apps	Goals
Capivariano	2014	Paulista A2	—		9	0	—		—		—		10	0
Capivariano	2015	Paulista	—		13	0	1	0	—		—		14	0
Capivariano	2016	Paulista	—		8	0	—		—		—		8	0
Capivariano	Total		—		30	0	1	0	—		—		31	0
Anderlecht (loan)	2014–15	Pro League	0	0	—		0	0	—		—		0	0
Bragantino (loan)	2015	Série B	16	0	—		—		—		—		16	0
CRB	2016	Série B	5	0	—		1	0	—		—		6	0
Ashdod	2016–17	Premier League	0	0	—		2	0	—		—		2	0
Santos	2017	Série A	0	0	—		—		—		5 (Note: Appearance(s) in Copa Paulista)	0	5	0
Real Ariquemes	2019	Série D	7	2	1	0	1	0	—		—		9	2
Real Ariquemes	2020	Rondoniense	—		4	0	—		—		—		4	0
Real Ariquemes	Total		7	2	5	0	1	0	—		—		13	2
Career total			28	2	35	0	4	0	0	0	5	0	72	2
