= Sébastien Locigno =

Belgian footballer

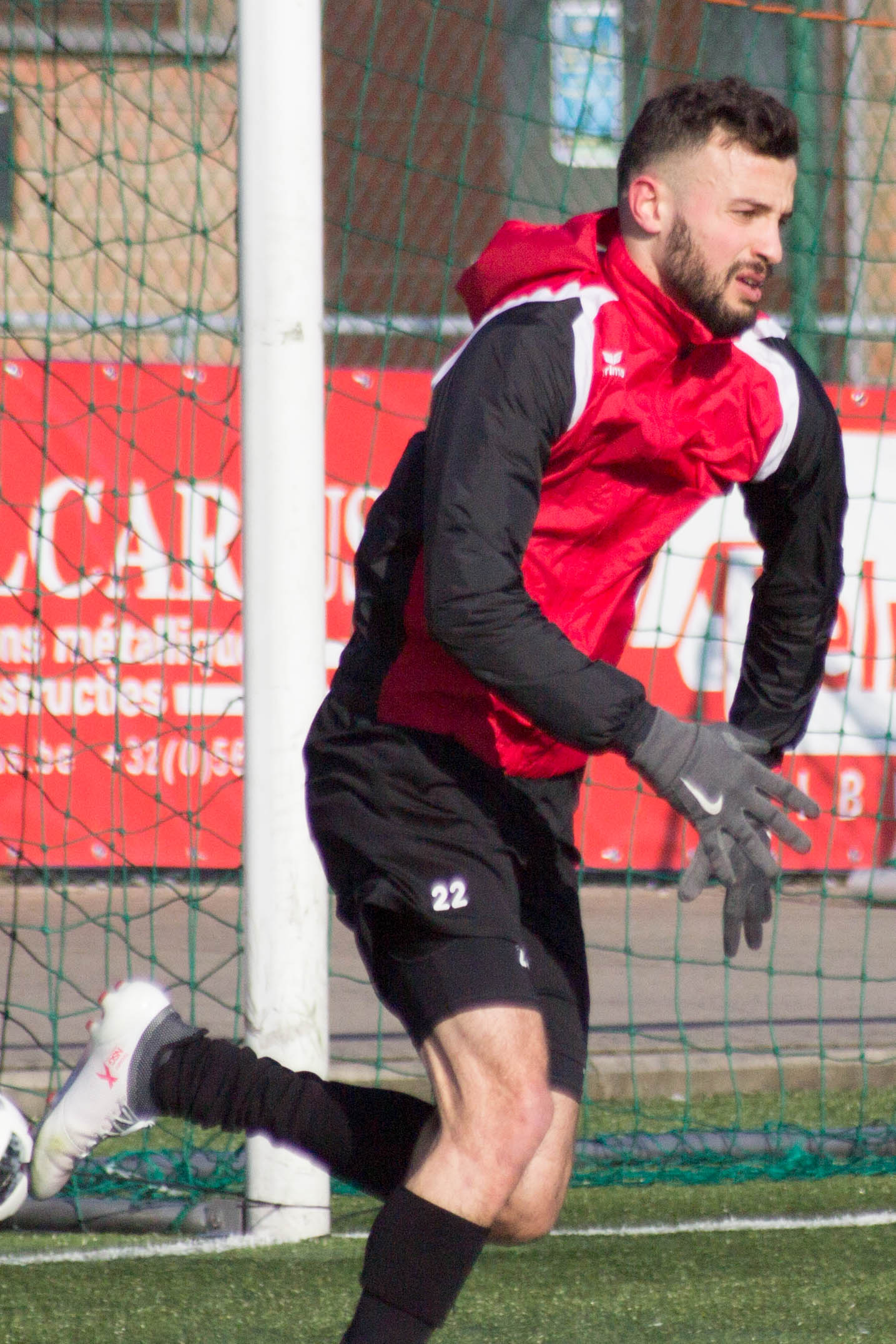

Personal information
- Full name: Sébastien Locigno
- Date of birth: 2 September 1995 (age 31)
- Place of birth: Meise, Belgium
- Height: 1.83 m (6 ft 0 in)
- Position: Right-back

Youth career
- 1999–2000: Standard Liège
- 2000–2002: SCUP Jette
- 2002–2004: Anderlecht
- 2004–2006: WS Woluwe FC
- 2006–2008: FC Strombeek
- 2008–2009: FCV Dender EH
- 2009–2010: Standard Liège
- 2010–2011: Anderlecht
- 2011–2013: Standard Liège

Senior career*
Years	Team	Apps	(Gls)
2013–2015	Gent	14	(0)
2015–2017	Oostende	7	(0)
2016–2017	→ Go Ahead Eagles (loan)	15	(0)
2017–2018	Mouscron	5	(0)
2019–2020	La Louvière Centre	8	(0)
2020–2021	Francs Borains	0	(0)

International career
2010	Belgium U15	2	(0)
2010–2011	Belgium U16	12	(1)
2011–2012	Belgium U17	7	(0)
2012	Belgium U18	2	(0)
2013–2014	Belgium U19	12	(3)
- * Club domestic league appearances and goals as of 21:55, 19 December 2021 (UTC)

Sébastien Locigno (born 2 September 1995) is a retired Belgian professional footballer who played as a right-back.

== Career ==
He made his Jupiler Pro League debut for Gent on 26 December 2013 in the 21st week of the 2013–14 season against Mons. He replaced Yaya Soumahoro after 60 minutes in a 1–0 away defeat.

In April 2020, ahead of the 2020–21 season, Locigno signed with Francs Borains. His contract with the club was terminated by mutual consent in December 2021, making him a free agent.

== Personal life ==
Locigno was born in Belgium to an Italian father and a Belgian mother.
