= 2014–15 Belgian Pro League =

112th season of top-tier football in Belgium

Jupiler Pro League
- Season: 2014–15
- Champions: K.A.A. Gent; 1st league title
- Relegated: Lierse; Cercle Brugge
- Champions League: Gent; Club Brugge
- Europa League: Anderlecht; Standard Liège; Charleroi
- Matches: 296
- Goals: 848 (2.86 per match)
- Top goalscorer: Aleksandar Mitrović (20 goals)
- Biggest home win: Charleroi 6–0 Lierse (regular season); K.R.C. Genk 7–1 Waasland-Beveren (UEL play-offs)
- Biggest away win: Lierse 0–6 Club Brugge
- Highest scoring: Standard Liège 3–5 Oostende
- Longest winning run: 5 games Kortrijk
- Longest unbeaten run: 19 games Club Brugge
- Longest winless run: 13 games LierseS.K.
- Longest losing run: 10 games Royal Mouscron-Péruwelz

The 2014–15 season of the Belgian Pro League (known as the Jupiler Pro League for sponsorship reasons) is the 112th season of top-tier football in Belgium. It started on 27 July 2014 and finished in May 2015. K.A.A. Gent won the league, making it the first championship title in their 115-year history.

== Teams ==
Following the 2013–14 Belgian Pro League, R.A.E.C. Mons were relegated to the 2014–15 Belgian Second Division after losing their relegation playoff series against OH Leuven. Mons is replaced by 2013–14 Belgian Second Division champions K.V.C. Westerlo, who returned to the highest level after their relegation during the 2011–12 season.

Mouscron-Péruwelz replaces OH Leuven as they won the 2014 Belgian Second Division final round head of K.A.S. Eupen, Sint-TruidenV.V. and OH Leuven.

=== Stadia and locations ===
Location of the 2014–15 Belgian Pro League teams

| Club | Location | Venue | Capacity |
|---|---|---|---|
| Anderlecht | Anderlecht | Constant Vanden Stock Stadium | 21,000 |
| Cercle Brugge | Brugge | Jan Breydel Stadium | 29,945 |
| Charleroi | Charleroi | Stade du Pays de Charleroi | 25,000 |
| Club Brugge | Brugge | Jan Breydel Stadium | 29,945 |
| K.R.C. Genk | Genk | Cristal Arena | 24,900 |
| K.A.A. Gent | Ghent | Ghelamco Arena | 20,000 |
| Kortrijk | Kortrijk | Guldensporen Stadion | 9,500 |
| Lierse | Lier | Herman Vanderpoortenstadion | 14,538 |
| Lokeren | Lokeren | Daknamstadion | 10,000 |
| Mechelen | Mechelen | Argosstadion Achter de Kazerne | 13,123 |
| Mouscron-Péruwelz | Mouscron | Stade Le Canonnier | 10,800 |
| Oostende | Ostend | Albertpark | 8,125 |
| Standard Liège | Liège | Stade Maurice Dufrasne | 30,000 |
| Waasland-Beveren | Beveren | Freethiel Stadion | 13,290 |
| Westerlo | Westerlo | Het Kuipje | 7,982 |
| Zulte Waregem | Waregem | Regenboogstadion | 8,500 |

=== Personnel and kits ===
| Club | Chairman | Manager | Manufacturer | Sponsors |
|---|---|---|---|---|
| Anderlecht | (Belgium) Roger Vanden Stock | (Kosovo) Besnik Hasi | adidas | BNP Paribas Fortis |
| Cercle Brugge | (Belgium) Paul Vanhaecke | (Netherlands) Dennis van Wijk | Masita | ADMB |
| Charleroi | (Belgium) Fabien Debecq | (Belgium) Felice Mazzu | Maps | belgacom |
| Club Brugge | (Belgium) Bart Verhaeghe | (Belgium) Michel Preud'homme | Nike | proximus |
| Genk | (Belgium) Herbert Houben | (Scotland) Alex McLeish | Nike | beobank |
| Gent | (Belgium) Michel Louwagie | (Belgium) Hein Vanhaezebrouck | Masita/Jartazi | VDK |
| Kortrijk | (Belgium) Joseph Allijns | (Belgium) Yves Vanderhaeghe | Jako | AGO Jobs |
| Lierse | (Egypt) Maged Samy | (France) Olivier Guillou | Jako | Wadi Degla |
| Lokeren | (Belgium) Roger Lambrecht | (Belgium) Peter Maes | Jartazi | QTeam |
| Mechelen | (Belgium) Johan Timmermans | (Serbia) Aleksandar Janković | Kappa | Telenet |
| Mouscron-Péruwelz | (Belgium) Edward Van Daele | (France) Fernando Da Cruz | Nike | TradeCo |
| Oostende | (Belgium) Marc Coucke | (Belgium) Frederik Vanderbiest | Joma | Versluys |
| Standard Liège | (Belgium) Roland Duchâtelet | (Belgium) José Riga | Joma | BASE |
| Waasland-Beveren | (Belgium) Jozef Van Remoortel | (Belgium) Guido Brepoels | Jako | Remo Frit |
| Westerlo | (Belgium) Herman Wijnants | (Netherlands) Harm van Veldhoven | Saller | Soudal |
| Zulte Waregem | (Belgium) Willy Naessens | (Belgium) Francky Dury | Patrick | Record Bank |

=== Managerial changes ===
| Team | Outgoing manager | Manner of departure | Date of vacancy | Position | Replaced by | Date of appointment |
|---|---|---|---|---|---|---|
| Gent | (Belgium) Peter Balette | Replaced | End of 2013–14 season | Pre-season | (Belgium) Hein Vanhaezebrouck | 5 May 2014 |
| Kortrijk | (Belgium) Hein Vanhaezebrouck | Signed by Gent | End of 2013–14 season | Pre-season | (Belgium) Yves Vanderhaeghe | 28 May 2014 |
| Mechelen | (Belgium) Franky Vercauteren | Resigned | End of 2013–14 season | Pre-season | (Serbia) Aleksandar Janković | 8 May 2014 |
| Waasland-Beveren | (Belgium) Bob Peeters | Resigned | End of 2013–14 season | Pre-season | (Belgium) Ronny Van Geneugden | 28 May 2014 |
| Genk | (Belgium) Emilio Ferrera | Sacked | 29 July 2014 | 11th | (Scotland) Alex McLeish | 22 August 2014 |
| Lierse | (Netherlands) Stanley Menzo | Sacked | 31 August 2014 | 16th | (Slovenia) Slaviša Stojanovič | 5 September 2014 |
| Cercle Brugge | (Belgium) Lorenzo Staelens | Sacked | 6 October 2014 | 14th | (Iceland) Arnar Viðarsson | 6 October 2014 |
| Standard Liège | (Israel) Guy Luzon | Sacked | 20 October 2014 | 11th | (Serbia) Ivan Vukomanović (Note: Vukomanović had initially been appointed as caretaker manager following the sacking of Guy Luzon on 20 October 2014, but was appointed head coach on 5 November 2014 until the end of the season, due to good results.) | 5 November 2014 |
| Mouscron-Péruwelz | (France) Rachid Chihab | Sacked | 29 December 2014 | 12th | (France) Fernando da Cruz | 29 December 2014 |
| Waasland-Beveren | (Belgium) Ronny Van Geneugden | Sacked | 30 December 2014 | 14th | (Belgium) Guido Brepoels | 5 January 2015 |
| Westerlo | (Netherlands) Dennis van Wijk | Sacked | 3 January 2015 | 13th | (Netherlands) Harm van Veldhoven | 6 January 2015 |
| Lierse | (Slovenia) Slaviša Stojanovič | Resigned | 28 January 2015 | 16th | (Belgium) Herman Helleputte | 28 January 2015 |
| Lierse | (Belgium) Herman Helleputte | Resigned | 30 January 2015 | 16th | (France) Olivier Guillou | 30 January 2015 |
| Standard Liège | (Serbia) Ivan Vukomanović | Replaced | 2 February 2015 | 5th | (Belgium) José Riga | 2 February 2015 |
| Cercle Brugge | (Iceland) Arnar Viðarsson | Sacked | 18 March 2015 | Relegation Playoff, 1st | (Netherlands) Dennis van Wijk | 18 March 2015 |

== Regular season ==
=== League table ===
| Pos | Team | Pld | W | D | L | GF | GA | GD | Pts | Qualification or relegation |
|---|---|---|---|---|---|---|---|---|---|---|
| 1 | Club Brugge | 30 | 17 | 10 | 3 | 69 | 28 | +41 | 61 | Qualification for the Championship play-offs |
| 2 | Gent | 30 | 16 | 9 | 5 | 52 | 29 | +23 | 57 | Qualification for the Championship play-offs |
| 3 | Anderlecht | 30 | 16 | 9 | 5 | 51 | 30 | +21 | 57 | Qualification for the Championship play-offs |
| 4 | Standard Liège | 30 | 16 | 5 | 9 | 49 | 39 | +10 | 53 | Qualification for the Championship play-offs |
| 5 | Kortrijk | 30 | 16 | 3 | 11 | 54 | 35 | +19 | 51 | Qualification for the Championship play-offs |
| 6 | Charleroi | 30 | 14 | 7 | 9 | 44 | 31 | +13 | 49 | Qualification for the Championship play-offs |
| 7 | Genk | 30 | 13 | 10 | 7 | 38 | 28 | +10 | 49 | Qualification for the Europa League play-offs |
| 8 | Lokeren | 30 | 10 | 12 | 8 | 38 | 32 | +6 | 42 | Qualification for the Europa League play-offs |
| 9 | Mechelen | 30 | 10 | 11 | 9 | 37 | 39 | −2 | 41 | Qualification for the Europa League play-offs |
| 10 | Oostende | 30 | 11 | 5 | 14 | 40 | 52 | −12 | 38 | Qualification for the Europa League play-offs |
| 11 | Westerlo | 30 | 8 | 9 | 13 | 42 | 63 | −21 | 33 | Qualification for the Europa League play-offs |
| 12 | Zulte Waregem | 30 | 8 | 7 | 15 | 41 | 54 | −13 | 31 | Qualification for the Europa League play-offs |
| 13 | Mouscron-Péruwelz | 30 | 7 | 5 | 18 | 32 | 51 | −19 | 26 | Qualification for the Europa League play-offs |
| 14 | Waasland-Beveren | 30 | 7 | 5 | 18 | 30 | 49 | −19 | 26 | Qualification for the Europa League play-offs |
| 15 | Cercle Brugge | 30 | 6 | 6 | 18 | 21 | 45 | −24 | 24 | Qualification for the Relegation play-offs |
| 16 | Lierse | 30 | 5 | 7 | 18 | 30 | 63 | −33 | 22 | Qualification for the Relegation play-offs |

Source: Belgian Pro League
Rules for classification: 1) points; 2) number of matches won; if teams are still tied a play-off is organised.

=== Results ===
| Home \ Away | AND | CER | CHA | BRU | GNK | GNT | KVK | LIE | LOK | KVM | MOU | KVO | STA | WBE | WES | ZWA |
|---|---|---|---|---|---|---|---|---|---|---|---|---|---|---|---|---|
| Anderlecht | | 3–2 | 1–0 | 2–2 | 0–0 | 1–2 | 2–0 | 3–0 | 1–1 | 1–1 | 3–1 | 3–0 | 0–2 | 1–0 | 4–0 | 0–0 |
| Cercle Brugge | 0–2 | | 1–0 | 0–3 | 0–1 | 0–0 | 0–4 | 1–2 | 1–0 | 2–3 | 2–1 | 0–1 | 0–1 | 1–0 | 1–2 | 2–2 |
| Charleroi | 3–1 | 0–2 | | 0–0 | 1–0 | 0–0 | 0–2 | 6–0 | 1–0 | 2–0 | 2–0 | 2–0 | 0–1 | 2–2 | 2–3 | 2–1 |
| Club Brugge | 2–2 | 1–1 | 1–0 | | 4–1 | 2–2 | 5–0 | 1–0 | 1–1 | 1–1 | 3–0 | 2–0 | 3–0 | 4–2 | 5–0 | 2–1 |
| Genk | 0–1 | 1–1 | 1–1 | 1–1 | | 3–2 | 3–0 | 3–0 | 0–0 | 3–0 | 2–0 | 1–1 | 0–2 | 1–0 | 3–1 | 3–2 |
| Gent | 0–2 | 4–0 | 2–2 | 2–1 | 0–0 | | 0–1 | 2–1 | 1–1 | 3–1 | 1–0 | 3–1 | 1–2 | 4–1 | 4–0 | 3–1 |
| Kortrijk | 2–3 | 1–0 | 0–0 | 2–0 | 1–1 | 2–3 | | 1–0 | 2–3 | 3–0 | 3–0 | 0–2 | 2–3 | 2–1 | 6–0 | 3–1 |
| Lierse | 2–2 | 2–1 | 0–2 | 0–6 | 0–2 | 0–1 | 0–0 | | 1–1 | 0–1 | 2–2 | 2–0 | 2–3 | 1–1 | 3–3 | 3–1 |
| Lokeren | 1–2 | 0–0 | 5–2 | 1–3 | 1–1 | 3–3 | 1–2 | 2–0 | | 3–2 | 1–0 | 3–1 | 1–1 | 3–0 | 0–0 | 2–1 |
| Mechelen | 1–1 | 1–1 | 0–0 | 3–1 | 3–1 | 0–0 | 1–2 | 2–1 | 0–1 | | 1–0 | 0–0 | 1–0 | 2–0 | 5–2 | 1–1 |
| Mouscron-Péruwelz | 4–2 | 4–0 | 0–2 | 1–4 | 1–2 | 1–3 | 0–3 | 2–1 | 2–2 | 1–1 | | 0–1 | 5–2 | 1–0 | 1–0 | 0–1 |
| Oostende | 0–2 | 2–0 | 1–3 | 2–2 | 1–1 | 1–3 | 1–7 | 2–1 | 0–1 | 2–0 | 0–0 | | 3–2 | 4–3 | 4–0 | 1–3 |
| Standard Liège | 2–0 | 1–0 | 3–0 | 1–3 | 1–0 | 0–1 | 0–2 | 2–2 | 2–0 | 2–0 | 3–0 | 3–5 | | 3–2 | 2–2 | 1–2 (Note: The match was abandoned after 89 minutes due to Standard Liège supporter violence, with Zulte Waregem at that time leading 1–2. Standard Liège was subsequently given a 0–5 loss and forced to play one match behind closed doors. Standard however objected this ruling and after revision by the Belgian Sportsarbitrage, it was decided that the 1–2 result stood and that Standard was fined €5000. The one match behind closed doors penalty was dropped.) |
| Waasland-Beveren | 0–2 | 1–0 | 1–3 | 0–2 | 0–1 | 0–1 | 1–0 | 2–0 | 0–0 | 2–2 | 2–1 | 1–0 | 0–2 | | 1–1 | 1–3 |
| Westerlo | 2–2 | 1–0 | 2–3 | 1–3 | 1–2 | 0–0 | 2–1 | 6–1 | 1–0 | 1–1 | 1–3 | 3–0 | 1–1 | 1–2 | | 2–2 |
| Zulte Waregem | 0–2 | 1–2 | 1–3 | 1–1 | 2–0 | 2–1 | 2–0 | 2–3 | 1–0 | 2–3 | 1–1 | 1–4 | 1–1 | 1–4 | 1–3 | |

Source: Belgian Pro League
Legend: Blue = home team win; Yellow = draw; Red = away team win.

== Championship playoff ==
The points obtained during the regular season were halved (and rounded up) before the start of the playoff. As a result, the teams started with the following points before the playoff: Club Brugge 31 points, Gent 29, Anderlecht 29, Standard 27, Kortrijk 26 and Charleroi 25. Had any ties occurred at the end of the playoffs, the half point would have been deducted if it was added. However, as all six teams received the half point bonus, this did not make a difference this season.

=== Playoff table ===
| Pos | Team | Pld | W | D | L | GF | GA | GD | Pts | Qualification | GNT | CLU | AND | STA | CHA | KOR |
|---|---|---|---|---|---|---|---|---|---|---|---|---|---|---|---|---|
| 1 | Gent (C) | 10 | 6 | 2 | 2 | 18 | 11 | +7 | 49 | Qualification for the Champions League group stage | — | 2–2 | 2–1 | 2–0 | 1–1 | 2–0 |
| 2 | Club Brugge | 10 | 5 | 1 | 4 | 16 | 16 | 0 | 47 | Qualification for the Champions League third qualifying round | 2–3 | — | 2–1 | 2–1 | 3–1 | 1–0 |
| 3 | Anderlecht | 10 | 5 | 2 | 3 | 18 | 13 | +5 | 46 | Qualification for the Europa League group stage (Note: Since winners of the 2014–15 Belgian Cup, Club Brugge, qualified for the Champions League based on league position, the spot awarded to the Cup winner (Europa League group stage) was passed to the third-placed team and the other spots were adjusted accordingly.) | 2–1 | 3–1 | — | 1–1 | 1–0 | 5–1 |
| 4 | Standard Liège | 10 | 4 | 1 | 5 | 14 | 13 | +1 | 40 | Qualification for the Europa League third qualifying round | 1–3 | 1–0 | 3–1 | — | 2–0 | 4–0 |
| 5 | Charleroi | 10 | 3 | 2 | 5 | 13 | 15 | −2 | 36 | Qualification for the Testmatches to Europa League (Note: The team finishing in fifth place, Charleroi, will play the testmatches against the winner of the Belgian Europa League playoff final, for a spot in the Europa League second qualifying round.) | 2–1 | 2–3 | 0–1 | 1–0 | — | 5–2 |
| 6 | Kortrijk | 10 | 2 | 2 | 6 | 11 | 22 | −11 | 34 | | 0–1 | 2–0 | 2–2 | 3–1 | 1–1 | — |

Source: soccerway.com
Rules for classification: 1) points; 2) points after deduction of (possible) half points added due to rounding; 3) number of wins; 4) goal difference; 5) number of goals scored; 6) number of away goals scored; 7) number of away wins.
(C) Champions

== Europa League playoff ==
Group A contains the teams finishing the regular season in positions 7, 9, 12 and 14. The teams that finish in positions 8, 10, 11 and 13 were placed in Group B.

=== Group A ===
| Pos | Team | Pld | W | D | L | GF | GA | GD | Pts | Qualification | KVM | GNK | ZWA | W-B |
|---|---|---|---|---|---|---|---|---|---|---|---|---|---|---|
| 1 | Mechelen (A) | 6 | 5 | 0 | 1 | 14 | 3 | +11 | 15 | Qualification for the Playoff Final | — | 4–0 | 3–0 | 4–1 |
| 2 | Genk | 6 | 5 | 0 | 1 | 14 | 7 | +7 | 15 | | 1–0 | — | 1–0 | 7–1 |
| 3 | Zulte Waregem | 6 | 1 | 1 | 4 | 6 | 10 | −4 | 4 | | 0–1 | 2–3 | — | 2–2 |
| 4 | Waasland-Beveren | 6 | 0 | 1 | 5 | 5 | 19 | −14 | 1 | | 1–2 | 0–2 | 0–2 | — |

Source: Soccerway
Rules for classification: 1) points; 2) goal difference
(A) Advance to the Final

=== Group B ===
| Pos | Team | Pld | W | D | L | GF | GA | GD | Pts | Qualification | LOK | RMP | OOS | WES |
|---|---|---|---|---|---|---|---|---|---|---|---|---|---|---|
| 1 | Lokeren (A) | 6 | 4 | 1 | 1 | 19 | 9 | +10 | 13 | Qualification for the Playoff Final | — | 2–1 | 6–1 | 1–1 |
| 2 | Mouscron-Péruwelz | 6 | 3 | 1 | 2 | 9 | 8 | +1 | 10 | | 1–5 | — | 2–0 | 1–1 |
| 3 | Oostende | 6 | 2 | 0 | 4 | 6 | 12 | −6 | 6 | | 1–2 | 0–1 | — | 2–0 |
| 4 | Westerlo | 6 | 1 | 2 | 3 | 7 | 12 | −5 | 5 | | 4–3 | 0–3 | 1–2 | — |

Source: Soccerway
Rules for classification: 1) points; 2) goal difference
(A) Advance to the Final

=== Europa League playoff final ===
The winners of both playoff groups, Mechelen and Lokeren, compete in a two-legged match to play the fourth-placed team of the championship playoff, called Testmatch. The winners of this Testmatch will be granted entry to the second qualifying round of the 2015–16 UEFA Europa League.

16 May 2015
20:00

| Lokeren | 2–2 | Mechelen |
|---|---|---|
| Ngolok 34', 56' | Report | Veselinović 11'; Naessens 49' |

Daknamstadion, Lokeren
Attendance: 5,763
Referee: Joeri van de Velde

23 May 2015
20:00

| Mechelen | 2–1 | Lokeren |
|---|---|---|
| Hanni 6'; Kosanović 56' | Report | Marić 90+2' (pen.) |

Den Dreef, Leuven
Attendance: 6,340
Referee: Frederik Geldhof

Mechelen won 4–3 on aggregate.

=== Testmatches Europa League ===
The Europa League playoff final was played over two legs between the Europa league playoff final winners, Mechelen, and the fifth-placed finisher of the championship playoff, Charleroi. The winners qualified for the second qualifying round of the 2015–16 UEFA Europa League.

28 May 2015
20:30

| Mechelen | 2–1 | Charleroi |
|---|---|---|
| Cissé 42'; Kosanović 86' | Report | Geraerts 55' |

Den Dreef, Leuven

31 May 2015
14:30

| Charleroi | 2–0 | Mechelen |
|---|---|---|
| Marinos 69'; Ndongala 89' |

Stade du Pays de Charleroi, Charleroi
Referee: Bart Vertenten

Charleroi wins 3–2 on aggregate

== Relegation playoff ==
The teams that finished in the last two positions will face each other in the relegation playoff. Lierse was sure of ending up in the relegation playoff after losing away to Gent on 7 March 2015, while Cercle Brugge qualified one week later after losing 2–3 at home to Mechelen.

The winner of this playoff will play the second division playoff with three Belgian Second Division teams, with only the winner of that playoff playing at the highest level the next season. Lierse failed to win the Belgian Second Division playoff resulting in their relegation, in addition to Cercle Brugge.

| Pos | Team | Pld | W | D | L | GF | GA | GD | Pts | Qualification or relegation |
|---|---|---|---|---|---|---|---|---|---|---|
| 1 | Lierse (R) | 4 | 3 | 0 | 1 | 8 | 4 | +4 | 9 | Qualification for the Belgian Second Division final round |
| 2 | Cercle Brugge (R) | 4 | 1 | 0 | 3 | 4 | 8 | −4 | 6 | Relegation to 2015–16 Belgian Second Division |

Source: soccerway.com
Rules for classification: 1) points; 2) head-to-head points; 3) head-to-head goal difference; 4) head-to-head goals scored; 5) goal difference; 6) number of goals scored.
(R) Relegated

The matches in the table below were played from left to right:

| Home \ Away | LIE | CER | LIE | CER | LIE | CER |
|---|---|---|---|---|---|---|
| Lierse | | 0–1 | | 3–1 | | |
| Cercle Brugge | 2–3 | | 0–2 | | – (Note: Match not played as Cercle Brugge could no longer overtake Lierse in the standings. In case of a tie, Lierse would have still ranked above Cercle Brugge due to the number of matches won.) | |

Source: soccerway.com
Legend: Blue = home team win; Yellow = draw; Red = away team win.

== Season statistics ==
Source: Sport.be (in Dutch)

Up to and including matches played on 24 May 2015.

=== Top scorers ===
| Position | Player | Club | Goals |
|---|---|---|---|
| 1 | (Serbia) Aleksandar Mitrović | Anderlecht | 20 |
| 2 | (Croatia) Ivan Santini | Kortrijk | 15 |
| 3 | (Belgium) Renaud Emond | Waasland-Beveren | 14 |
| 3 | (Belgium) Geoffrey Mujangi Bia | Standard Liège | 14 |
| 5 | (Belgium) Laurent Depoitre | Gent | 13 |
| 5 | (Colombia) José Izquierdo | Club Brugge | 13 |
| 5 | (Serbia) Dalibor Veselinović | Mechelen | 13 |
| 8 | (France) Teddy Chevalier | Kortrijk | 12 |
| 8 | (Mali) Abdoulay Diaby | Mouscron-Péruwelz | 12 |
| 8 | (Switzerland) Mijat Marić | Lokeren | 12 |

=== Hat-tricks ===
Key
| ^{4} | Player scored four goals |
| * | The home team |

| Player | For | Against | Result | Date |
|---|---|---|---|---|
| (Chile) Nicolás Castillo | Club Brugge* | Westerlo | 5–0 | 9 November 2014 |
| (Nigeria) Moses Simon | Gent | Lokeren* | 3–3 | 1 February 2015 |
| (Croatia) Ivan Santini^{4} | Kortrijk* | Westerlo | 6–0 | 21 February 2015 |
| (Costa Rica) John Jairo Ruiz | Oostende | Zulte Waregem* | 1–4 | 15 March 2015 |
| (Belgium) Zinho Gano | Mouscron-Péruwelz | Westerlo* | 0–3 | 4 April 2015 |

== Attendances ==
| No. | Club | Average attendance | Change | Highest |
|---|---|---|---|---|
| 1 | Club Brugge | 26,000 | 2,5% | 28,500 |
| 2 | Standard de Liège | 24,555 | -1,2% | 27,700 |
| 3 | Anderlecht | 20,925 | 1,1% | 23,000 |
| 4 | Gent | 18,470 | 5,8% | 20,000 |
| 5 | Genk | 17,411 | -18,3% | 22,100 |
| 6 | Mechelen | 9,502 | 0,9% | 12,900 |
| 7 | Charleroi | 9,173 | 46,8% | 14,950 |
| 8 | Zulte Waregem | 8,408 | 1,4% | 11,000 |
| 9 | Lokeren | 8,095 | 11,4% | 11,350 |
| 10 | Kortrijk | 7,965 | 10,4% | 9,400 |
| 11 | Cercle Brugge | 7,641 | 1,4% | 14,500 |
| 12 | Lierse | 6,759 | -2,0% | 9,200 |
| 13 | Oostende | 6,019 | 19,3% | 7,250 |
| 14 | Westerlo | 5,972 | 73,1% | 8,000 |
| 15 | Waasland-Beveren | 5,194 | -0,6% | 7,950 |
| 16 | Mouscron | 3,708 | 109,3% | 9,500 |
