= Nicaise Kudimbana =

Congolese footballer (born 1987)

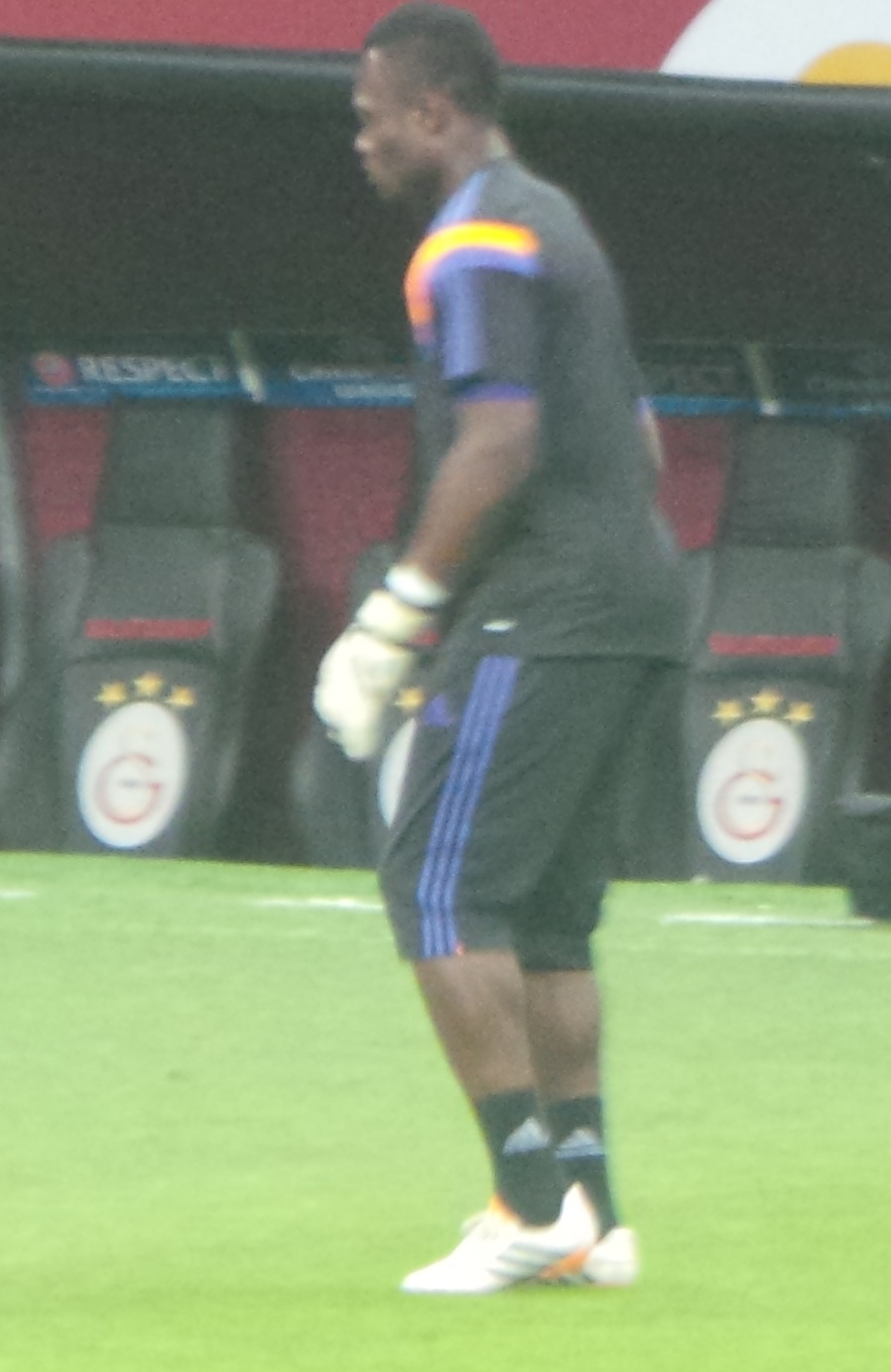

Personal information
- Full name: Nicaise Mulopo Kudimbana
- Date of birth: 21 January 1987 (age 39)
- Place of birth: Brussels, Belgium
- Height: 1.90 m (6 ft 3 in)
- Position: Goalkeeper

Team information
- Current team: RSCA Futures (goalkeeping coach)

Youth career
- 2001–2005: Union SG

Senior career*
Years	Team	Apps	(Gls)
2005–2008	Union SG	69	(0)
2008–2011	Anderlecht	0	(0)
2008–2009	→ Union SG (loan)	20	(0)
2011	→ Cercle Brugge (loan)	1	(0)
2011–2012	Cercle Brugge	1	(0)
2012–2014	Oostende	40	(0)
2014	→ Anderlecht (loan)	0	(0)
2014–2015	Anderlecht	0	(0)
2015–2017	Antwerp	47	(0)
2017–2018	Union SG	15	(0)
2019–2020	Wallonia Walhain	0	(0)
2020	RCS Brainois	0	(0)
2020	Roeselare	0	(0)
2021–2024	Winkel Sport	81	(0)
2024	Eendracht Aalst	3	(0)
2024–2025	Léopold FC		

International career
2007	Belgium U21	1	(0)
2008–2017	DR Congo	9	(0)
- * Club domestic league appearances and goals

Nicaise Mulopo Kudimbana (born 21 January 1987) is a Congolese former professional footballer who played as a goalkeeper. He is currently the goalkeeping coach of Challenger Pro League club RSCA Futures.

== Career ==
On 21 December 2007, Anderlecht saved the rights on him after he had played one season for Union Saint-Gilloise, after the season returned in July 2009 back to R.S.C. Anderlecht. On 31 August 2011, his contract with Anderlecht was terminated by mutual agreement. On 2 September 2011, it was announced that Kudimbana had signed a one-year contract with his former club Cercle Brugge. Following the 2011–12 season, Kudimbana moved to Belgian Second Division team Oostende.

In January 2014, Kudimbana joined former club Anderlecht on loan from Oostende for the rest of the season. Despite not playing a match in that time Anderlecht signed him up permanently in June 2014.

Ahead of the 2019–20 season, Kudimbana joined Wallonia Walhain. Kudimbana had also received an offer earlier that year to become a goalkeepers coach at his former club Anderlecht, where his childhood friend Vincent Kompany had just arrived as player-coach.

On 31 March 2020, Kudimbana moved to RCS Brainois. In July 2020 he signed for Roeselare but, after the club entered bankruptcy proceedings later that year, he made no first-team appearances. He signed for Winkel Sport in January 2021, and in June 2021 also took up a role as a youth goalkeeping coach at Léopold FC.

After three seasons with Winkel Sport, Kudimbana signed for Belgian Division 2 side Eendracht Aalst in January 2024, providing cover after first-choice goalkeeper Zvonimir Mikulić was ruled out through injury. In June 2024, he returned to Léopold FC as a player.

== International career ==
He made his first cap for DR Congo national team against Algeria on 26 March 2008, and is former member of the Belgium U21.

== Honours ==
Anderlecht

- Belgian Super Cup: 2014

DR Congo

- Africa Cup of Nations third place: 2015
