= Colorado, Paraná =

Coordinates: 22°50′16″S 51°58′22″W

- Municipality
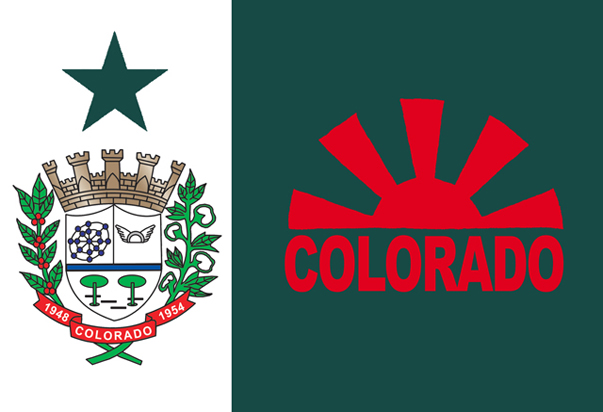
- Flag
- Interactive map of Colorado, Paraná
- Country: Brazil
- Region: Southern
- State: Paraná
- Mesoregion: Noroeste Paranaense

Population (2020)
  - Total: 24,145
- Time zone: UTC−3 (BRT)

Colorado, Paraná is a municipality in the state of Paraná in the Southern Region of Brazil.

== See also ==
- List of municipalities in Paraná
