= Rachid Chihab =

Moroccan football manager

Personal information
- Date of birth: 9 September 1961 (age 65)
- Place of birth: Mohammedia, Morocco

Team information
- Current team: Lille U17 (head coach)

Managerial career
- Years: Team
- 1992–2009: Lille (youth)
- 2009–2013: Lille (reserves)
- 2013–2014: Mouscron-Péruwelz
- 2014–2017: Lille (reserves)
- 2019–2020: Feignies Aulnoye FC
- 2021–: Lille U17 (head coach)

Rachid Chihab (born 9 September 1961) is a Moroccan football manager who is currently managing Feignies Aulnoye FC.

Chihab was born in Morocco, and moved to France at the age of 12. He played football as an amateur, and quickly switched to coaching.
