= Oswal Álvarez =

Colombian footballer (born 1995)

Personal information
- Full name: Oswal Andrés Álvarez Salazar
- Date of birth: 11 June 1995 (age 31)
- Place of birth: Maicao, Colombia
- Height: 1.78 m (5 ft 10 in)
- Position: Striker

Team information
- Current team: Patriotas

Youth career
- 2005–2011: Academia

Senior career*
Years	Team	Apps	(Gls)
2011–2012	Academia	21	(8)
2013–2017	Anderlecht	5	(1)
2017–	Patriotas	7	(2)
- * Club domestic league appearances and goals as of 17:01, 24 July 2015 (UTC)

Oswal Andrés Álvarez Salazar (born 11 June 1995) is a Colombian footballer who plays as a striker for Patriotas in the Categoría Primera A.

== Club career ==
Álvarez joined Anderlecht in 2012 from Academia F.C. He made his Belgian Pro League debut at 20 December 2014 against Waasland-Beveren. He replaced Ibrahima Conté after 88 minutes in a 0–2 away win.
