= 2009–10 RSC Anderlecht season =

Anderlecht
2009–10 season
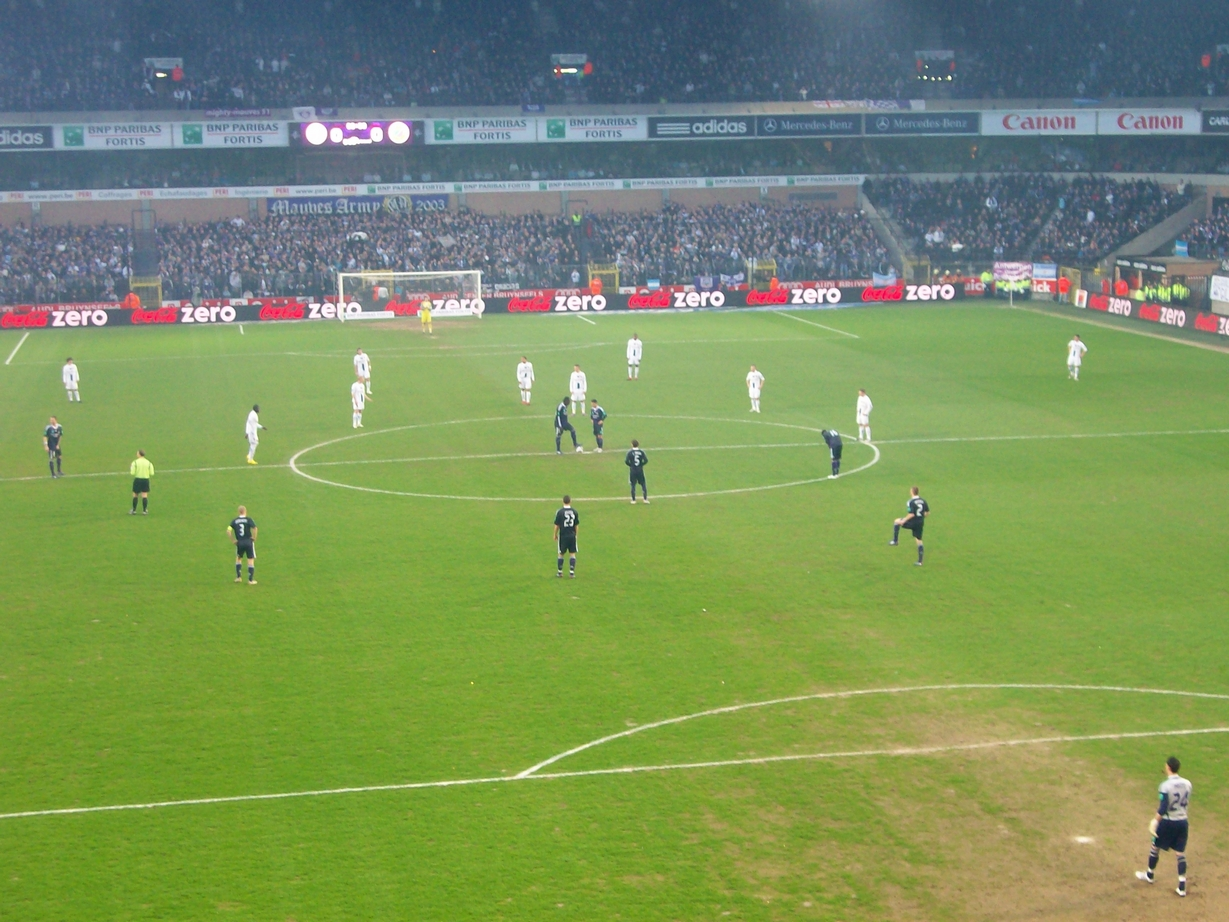
- Home game against Club Brugge, 3 April 2010
- President: Roger Vanden Stock
- Head coach: Ariël Jacobs
- Stadium: Constant Vanden Stock Stadium
- Belgian Pro League: 1st
- Belgian Cup: Quarter-finals
- UEFA Champions League: Play-off round
- UEFA Europa League: Round of 16
- Top goalscorer: League: Romelu Lukaku (15); All: Romelu Lukaku (19)
Home colours	Away colours

In the 2009–10 season Anderlecht competed in the Belgian Pro League, Belgian Cup, UEFA Champions League, and the UEFA Europa League.

== Key events ==
- 5 June: Following the Fortis takeover, BNP Paribas will now feature as sponsor on the Anderlecht shirts.
- 17 June: Hervé Kage moves to Charleroi on a free transfer. At Anderlecht, the 20-year-old had never made it into the first squad.
- 24 June: Czech defender Ondřej Mazuch joins the squad as he is loaned for one season from Italian giants Fiorentina. In the contract there is also an option to buy him at the end of the season.
- 25 June: In the new Superleague Formula season, the Anderlecht racing team will be represented by Dutch driver Yelmer Buurman. Last season's driver Craig Dolby moves to Tottenham Hotspur.
- 30 June: The sponsor deal with BNP Paribas is now fully sealed, the contract will initially just be for one year, until the end of the current season.
- 30 June: During a collision while training, Cheikhou Kouyaté fractures his Zygomatic bone, causing him to be out for two months.
- 20 July: After half a year of recovering from various injuries in Argentina, Anderlecht's goal getter Nicolás Frutos returns to Belgium and immediately claims to be fit enough to play.
- 24 July: Anderlecht presents itself to the press for the new season. Although few transfers were made, the staff claims the team has "definitely improved" compared to last season.
- 27 July: Just one day before the vital UEFA Champions League match against Sivasspor, the news spreads that Jelle Van Damme shows interest in leaving the club immediately as he "needs a challenge" and would like to "play at a club sure of Champions League participation". He is still under contract for two more seasons however and coach Ariël Jacobs therefore neglects his requests and uses Van Damme in his starting lineup against Sivasspor. This made it impossible for him to play at any other team in the Champions League this season. As Van Damme claimed to be offered a contract by an unnamed club with negotiations pending, Anderlecht suspected Standard Liège to have offered him a contract to destabilize Anderlecht. Standard however have denied this.
- 3 August: Argentinian midfielder Hernán Losada is loaned out for one season to Dutch team Heerenveen.
- 30 August: In the Jupiler Pro League, the two best teams of last season play each other as Anderlecht receives Standard at home, which results in an extremely rough and chaotic match. After a wild and gruesome tackle, Standard's Axel Witsel causes multiple open fractures in both the calf and tibia of Marcin Wasilewski, leaving him sidelined for a very long period of time, with estimates going from 8 to 13 months after several successful operations. In the same match Jan Polák tore the ligaments in his knee after contact with Igor De Camargo, leaving him out for probably about half a year. As a result of this match, Axel Witsel got suspended for eight matches in the Belgian League and received numerous anonymous death threats, together with Standard captain Steven Defour. Witsel was removed from the cover of the upcoming Panini sticker album of the Jupiler Pro League. Anderlecht coach Ariël Jacobs expressed his disgust in football and claimed he had "enough of it all", insinuating to quit at the end of the season when his contract ends. Standard sponsor BASE reacted by naming "the brutal tackle by Witsel untolerable" and claimed to support any penalty the club would give Witsel. After the earlier trouble concerning Jelle Van Damme near the end of July, both the staff of Anderlecht and Standard agree to meet and reconcile their differences for the good of Belgian football. Also, the match ended in a 1–1 draw.
- 31 August: Just before the end of the transfer deadline, 22-year-old Ukrainian winger Oleksandr Yakovenko is loaned out for one season to Westerlo.
- 21 September: Just recently recovered from his previous injury, Cheikhou Kouyaté now fractures his nose after colliding with Marko Šuler in the match versus Gent, causing him to be out for another six weeks.
- 30 October: In contrary to earlier statements that he would be leaving, Ariël Jacobs signs a new contract for two more seasons at Anderlecht.

== Players ==
N	Pos.	Nat.	Name	Age	EU	Since	App	Goals	Ends	Transfer fee	Notes
25	GK	(Belgium)	Bruzzese	20	EU	2007					
28	GK	(Belgium)	Cordier	25	EU	2009					
22	GK	(Belgium)	Schollen	31	EU	2006			2009		
24	GK	(Belgium)	Proto	26	EU	2006			2009		
1	GK	(Czech Republic)	Zítka	34	EU	2002			2010		
27	RB	(Poland)	Wasilewski	29	EU	2007			2011		
26	CB	(Honduras)	Bernárdez	27	Non-EU	2009			2009		
23	CB	(Hungary)	Juhász	26	EU	2003			2011		
4	CB	(Netherlands)	Kruiswijk	25	EU	2008			2012		
2	CB	(Czech Republic)	Mazuch	20	EU	2009			2009	On loan from Fiorentina	
44	CB	(Serbia)	Rnić	25	EU	2008			2011	Free	
6	CB	(Belgium)	Van Damme	26	EU	2006			2010		
3	LB	(Belgium)	Deschacht (VC)	28	EU	1996			2011		
5	DM	(Argentina)	Biglia	23	Non-EU	2006			2010		
30	DM	(Belgium)	Gillet	24	EU	2008			2013		
12	AM	(Belgium)	Chatelle	28	EU	2008			2011		
13	AM	(Belgium)	Legear	22	EU	2003			2011		
11	MF	(Netherlands) (Morocco)	Boussoufa	25	EU	2006			2012		
35	MF	(Belgium)	Crommen	18	EU					Youth system	
32	MF	(Senegal)	Diandy	20	EU	2009					
16	MF	(Senegal)	Kouyaté	20	EU	2008					
34	MF	(Democratic Republic of the Congo)	Mukendi	18	EU	2008					
8	MF	(Czech Republic)	Polák	28	EU	2007			2011		
37	MF	(Brazil)	Reynaldo	20	EU	2008			2011		
99	MF	(Ivory Coast)	Saré	19	Non-EU	2007				Youth system	
21	CF	(Belgium)	De Sutter	24	EU	2009			2013		
19	CF	(Argentina)	Frutos	28	Non-EU	2005			2010		
10	CF	(Brazil)	Kanu	22	EU	2008				Youth system	
36	CF	(Belgium)	Lukaku	16	EU	2009				Youth system	
9	CF	(Argentina)	Suárez	21	Non-EU	2008			2013	€1.2M	

- Last updated: 25 October 2009
- Source: rsca.be, players' Wikipedia articles, soccerbase.com, ESPN (for appearances and goals) and footballdatabase.com (for EU passport, contract ending and transfer fee)
- Ordered by position on pitch (from back right to front left).

== Jupiler Pro League ==
=== Classification ===
Pos	Team	Pld	W	D	L	GF	GA	GD	Pts	Qualification or relegation
1	Anderlecht (C, O)	28	22	3	3	62	20	+42	69	Qualification to Championship play-offs
2	Club Brugge	28	17	6	5	52	33	+19	57	Qualification to Championship play-offs
3	Gent	28	14	7	7	49	30	+19	49	Qualification to Championship play-offs
4	Kortrijk	28	12	9	7	39	30	+9	45	Qualification to Championship play-offs
5	Sint-Truiden	28	12	6	10	35	35	0	42	Qualification to Championship play-offs

Source: soccerway.com
Rules for classification: 1) points; 2) number of matches won; if teams are still tied a playoff is organised.
(C) Champions; (O) Play-off winners

=== Results summary ===
Overall								Home						Away					
Pld	W	D	L	GF	GA	GD	Pts	W	D	L	GF	GA	GD	W	D	L	GF	GA	GD
28	22	3	3	62	20	+42	69	11	2	1	27	10	+17	11	1	2	35	10	+25

Source: Jupiler League

=== Results by round ===
Round	1	2	3	4	5	6	7	8	9	10	11	12	13	14	15	16	17	18	19	20	21	22	23	24	25	26	27	28	29	30
Ground	A	H	H	A	H	A	H	A	H	A	H	A	H	A	H	H	A	A	H	A	H	A		A	H	H	A	A	H	A
Result	W	W	W	W	D	L	D	W	W	L	W	W	W	W	W	W	W	W	P	D	W	W		L	W	W	W	W	W	W
Position	3	1	1	1	1	3	3	2	1	2	2	2	2	1	1	1	1	1	1	1	1	1	1	1	1	1	1	1	1	1

Source: Competitive Matches and Soccerassociation.com
A = Away; H = Home; W = Win; D = Draw; L = Loss; P = Postponed

=== Results by opponent ===
Team	Results		Points
Team	Home	Away	Points
Cercle Brugge	3–2	3–1	6
Charleroi	2–0	2–0	6
Club Brugge	3–2	2–4	3
Genk	2–0	2–0	6
Gent	1–1	2–2	2
Germinal Beerschot	1–0	5–0	6
Kortrijk	1–0	2–0	6
Lokeren	2–0	4–0	6
Mechelen	2–0	2–0	6
~~Mouscron~~	/	/	0
Roeselare	3–1	2–1	6
Sint-Truiden	1–2	1–2	0
Standard Liège	1–1	4–0	4
Westerlo	3–0	2–0	6
Zulte-Waregem	2–1	2–0	6

Source: Belgian First Division 2009-10 article

== Competitive matches ==
Game	Date	Tournament	Round	Ground	Opponent	Score^{1}	Report
1	28 July	UEFA Champions League	QR3	H	Sivasspor (Turkey)	5–0	Report / Report link; Kick off / 20:45 CET; Referee / (Scotland) Craig Thomson; Anderlecht / Sivasspor; 17', 76' De Sutter; 22' Boussoufa; 32' Chatelle; 90+2' Frutos; (yellow card) 64' Van Damme / (yellow card) 26' Dereli; (yellow card) 35' Bayrak; (yellow card) 64' Tuncer
2	1 August	Jupiler Pro League	1	A	Kortrijk	2–0	Report / Report link; Kick off / 20:00 CET; Attendance / 8,640; Referee / (Belgium) Serge Gumienny; Anderlecht / Kortrijk; 8' Boussoufa; 71' Wasilewski; (yellow card) 45+1' Boussoufa; (yellow card) 73' Biglia / (yellow card) 52' Verbrugghe
3	4 August	UEFA Champions League	QR3	A (Turkey)	Sivasspor (Turkey)	1–3	Report / Report link; Kick off / 20:00 CET; Referee / (Spain) Manuel Mejuto González; Anderlecht / Sivasspor; 34' Van Damme / 12' Martin; 19' (pen.) Kamanan; 58' Aydın; (yellow card) 5' Kavuk
4	8 August	Jupiler Pro League	2	H	Cercle Brugge	3–2	Report / Report link; Kick off / 20:00 CET; Attendance / 22,400; Referee / (Belgium) Tim Pots; Anderlecht / Cercle Brugge; 13' Suárez; 43' (o.g.) Boi; 64' Boussoufa; (yellow card) 72' Wasilewski / 28' Portier; 74' Buffel; (yellow card) 45+1' Evens; (yellow card) 59' Boi
5	15 August	Jupiler Pro League	3	H	Westerlo	3–0	Report / Report link; Kick off / 18:00 CET; Attendance / 22,553; Referee / (Belgium) Luc Wouters; Anderlecht / Westerlo; 29' Van Damme; 45+1' Suárez; 74' Boussoufa / (yellow card) 11' Adams; (yellow card) 82' van Kerckhoven
6	19 August	UEFA Champions League	PO	A (France)	Lyon (France)	1–5	Report / Report link; Kick off / 20:45 CET; Referee / (Germany) Wolfgang Stark; Anderlecht / Lyon; 58' Suárez; (yellow card) 14' Proto; (yellow card) 15' Van Damme; (yellow card) 67' Suárez; (yellow card) 68' Polák / 10' Pjanić; 15' (pen.) Lisandro; 39' Bastos; 42', 63' Gomis
7	22 August	Jupiler Pro League	4	A	Zulte Waregem	2–0	Report / Report link; Kick off / 20:00 CET; Attendance / 8,285; Referee / (Belgium) Claude Bourdouxhe; Anderlecht / Zulte Waregem; 44' Boussoufa; 89' Lukaku; (yellow card) 26' Polák; (yellow card) 33' Boussoufa; (yellow card) 68' Chatelle
8	25 August	UEFA Champions League	PO	H	Lyon (France)	1–3	Report / Report link; Kick off / 20:45 CET; Referee / (Italy) Nicola Rizzoli; Anderlecht / Lyon; 51' (pen.) Suárez; (yellow card) 69' Boussoufa / 26', 32', 41' Lisandro; (yellow card) 66' Toulalan
9	30 August	Jupiler Pro League	5	H	Standard Liège	1–1	Report / Report link; Kick off / 20:30 CET; Attendance / 23,869; Referee / (Belgium) Jérôme Efong Nzolo; Anderlecht / Standard Liège; 44' Gillet; (yellow card) 17' Polák; (yellow card) 44' Boussoufa; (yellow card) 65' Chatelle / 38' Mbokani; (yellow card) 10' De Camargo; (red card) 27' Witsel; (yellow card) 45+2' Collet; (yellow card) 45+3' Mbokani; (yellow card) 89' Bolat; (yellow card) 90+2' Defour
10	12 September	Jupiler Pro League	6	A	Sint-Truiden	1–2	Report / Report link; Kick off / 18:00 CET; Attendance / 11,400; Referee / (Belgium) Johan Verbist; Anderlecht / Sint-Truiden; 83' Juhász; (yellow card) 31' Mazuch; (yellow card) 38' Chatelle; (yellow card) 57' Van Damme / 6' Chimedza; 9' Sidibe; (yellow card) 27' Mennes; (yellow card) 37' Sidibe; (yellow card) 52' Delorge
11	17 September	UEFA Europa League	GS	A (Croatia)	Dinamo Zagreb (Croatia)	2–0	Report / Report link; Kick off / 19:00 CET; Referee / (Hungary) Zsolt Szabó; Anderlecht / Dinamo Zagreb; 74' Bernárdez; 88' Legear; (yellow card) 32' Saré / (yellow card) 69' Badelj
12	20 September	Jupiler Pro League	7	H	Gent	1–1	Report / Report link; Kick off / 21:00 CET; Attendance / 23,616; Referee / (Belgium) Jean-Baptist Bultynck; Anderlecht / Gent; 32' Mazuch; (yellow card) 43' (yellow-red card) 53' Boussoufa; (yellow card) 50' Biglia; (yellow card) 53' Van Damme / 35' Leye; (yellow card) 57' Elghanassy
13	24 September	Jupiler Pro League	8	A	Mouscron	2–1	Report / Report link; Kick off / 20:30 CET; Attendance / 6,258; Referee / (Belgium) Tim Pots; Anderlecht / Mouscron; 32' (pen.) Suárez; 74' Lukaku; (yellow card) 31' Van Damme; (yellow card) 49' De Sutter / 24' El Araichi; (yellow card) 17' Aspas
14	27 September	Jupiler Pro League	9	H	Germinal Beerschot	1–0	Report / Report link; Kick off / 18:00 CET; Attendance / 23,282; Referee / (Belgium) Peter Vervecken; Anderlecht / Germinal Beerschot; 54' Lukaku; (yellow card) 90+1' Boussoufa / (yellow card) 70' Van Dooren; (yellow card) 71' Cruz; (red card) 87' Wanyama
15	1 October	UEFA Europa League	GS	H	Ajax (Netherlands)	1–1	Report / Report link; Kick off / 21:05 CET; Referee / (Iceland) Kristinn Jakobsson; Anderlecht / Ajax; 85' Legear; (yellow card) 69' Bernárdez; (yellow card) 77' Deschacht; (red card) 82' Van Damme / 72' Rommedahl; (yellow card) 82' de Zeeuw; (yellow card) 90+2' Vertonghen
16	4 October	Jupiler Pro League	10	A	Club Brugge	2–4	Report / Report link; Kick off / 16:00 CET; Attendance / 28,151; Referee / (Belgium) Luc Wouters; Anderlecht / Club Brugge; 32', 90+4' De Sutter; (yellow card) 25' Biglia; (yellow card) 53' De Sutter; (yellow card) 58' Gillet / 17' Alcaraz; 38' (o.g.) Van Damme; 40' Sonck; 83' Vargas; (yellow card) 62' Geraerts; (yellow card) 82' Odjidja-Ofoe
17	17 October	Jupiler Pro League	11	H	Charleroi	2–0	Report / Report link; Kick off / 20:00 CET; Attendance / 23,333; Referee / (Belgium) Claude Bourdouxhe; Anderlecht / Charleroi; 26' Biglia; 38' Lukaku; (yellow card) 90+2' Van Damme / (yellow card) 87' Kage
18	22 October	UEFA Europa League	GS	A (Romania)	Politehnica Timișoara (Romania)	0–0	Report / Report link; Kick off / 21:05 CET; Referee / (Switzerland) Claudio Circhetta; Anderlecht / Politehnica Timișoara; (yellow card) 44' Kanu / (yellow card) 19' Bonfim; (yellow card) 67' Mera; (yellow card) 87' Parks
19	25 October	Jupiler Pro League	12	A	Mechelen	2–0	Report / Report link; Kick off / 20:30 CET; Attendance / 12,931; Referee / (Belgium) Jérôme Efong Nzolo; Anderlecht / Mechelen; 12' Lukaku; 57' Boussoufa; (yellow card) 16' Gillet; (yellow card) 18' Deschacht; (yellow card) 38' Saré; (yellow card) 76' Boussoufa; (yellow card) 90+3' Proto / (yellow card) 75' Ghomsi
20	28 October	Cofidis Cup	Sixth	H	Verviers	2–0	Report / Report link; Kick off / 20:30 CET; Referee / (Belgium) Frederik Geldhof; Anderlecht / Verviers; 27' (o.g.) Spinosa; 47' Frutos / (yellow card) 56' Spinosa
21	31 October	Jupiler Pro League	13	H	Lokeren	2–0	Report / Report link; Kick off / 20:30 CET; Attendance / 22,814; Referee / (Netherlands) Björn Kuipers; Anderlecht / Lokeren; 34' Lukaku; 66' Suárez; (yellow card) 64' Suárez; (yellow card) 68' Mazuch / (yellow card) 70' Ziv; (yellow card) 74' Malki
22	5 November	UEFA Europa League	GS	H	Politehnica Timișoara (Romania)	3–1	Report / Report link; Kick off / 19:00 CET; Referee / (France) Tony Chapron; Anderlecht / Politehnica Timișoara; 30' Suárez; 69' Boussoufa; 90+5' Legear / 51' Parks; (yellow card) 29' Maxim
23	8 November	Jupiler Pro League	14	A	Genk	2–0	Report / Report link; Kick off / 18:00 CET; Attendance / 21,232; Referee / (Belgium) Stéphane Breda; Anderlecht / Genk; 25' Mazuch; 90+5' Lukaku; (yellow card) 19' Boussoufa; (yellow card) 90+4' Lukaku / (yellow card) 41' Matoukou; (yellow card) 57' Anele; (yellow card) 62' Joneleit
24	21 November	Jupiler Pro League	15	H	Roeselare	3–1	Report / Report link; Kick off / 20:00 CET; Attendance / 22,711; Referee / (Belgium) Joeri van de Velde; Anderlecht / Roeselare; 4' Juhász; 34' (o.g.) Sierens; 45+1' Lukaku; (yellow card) 34' (yellow-red card) 64' Boussoufa; (yellow card) 64' Juhász / 50' Viðarsson; (yellow card) 31' Kučera; (yellow card) 66' Nikolić; (yellow card) 87' Van Loo
25	27 November	Jupiler Pro League	16	H	Kortrijk	1–0	Report / Report link; Kick off / 20:30 CET; Attendance / 22,795; Referee / (Belgium) Serge Gumienny; Anderlecht / Kortrijk; 13' Juhász; (yellow card) 75' Biglia; (yellow card) 90+1' Mazuch / (yellow card) 32' Ciman; (yellow card) 81' Belhocine
26	2 December	UEFA Europa League	GS	H	Dinamo Zagreb (Croatia)	0–1	Report / Report link; Kick off / 21:05 CET; Referee / (Scotland) Douglas McDonald; Anderlecht / Dinamo Zagreb; (yellow card) 15' Deschacht; (yellow card) 79' Mazuch; (yellow card) 90+1' Van Damme / 57' Slepička; (yellow card) 8' Sammir; (yellow card) 41' Ibáñez; (yellow card) 81' Badelj; (yellow card) 89' Mandžukić
27	6 December	Jupiler Pro League	17	A	Cercle Brugge	3–1	Report / Report link; Kick off / 20:30 CET; Referee / (Belgium) Laurent Colemonts; Anderlecht / Cercle Brugge; 39' Legear; 41' Boussoufa; 90+1' Frutos; (yellow card) 79' Biglia; (yellow card) 90+1' Frutos / 80' Iachtchouk; (yellow card) 24' Gjuzelov; (yellow card) 41' Viane
28	11 December	Jupiler Pro League	18	A	Westerlo	2–0	Report / Report link; Kick off / 20:30 CET; Attendance / 8,000; Referee / (Belgium) Paul Allaerts; Anderlecht / Westerlo; 35' Lukaku; 82' Frutos
29	17 December	UEFA Europa League	GS	A (Netherlands)	Ajax (Netherlands)	3–1	Report / Report link; Kick off / 19:00 CET; Referee / (Turkey) Cüneyt Çakır; Anderlecht / Ajax; 13', 22' Lukaku; 43' Legear; (yellow card) 75' Deschacht / 77' Emanuelson; (yellow card) 90+3' Suárez
30	23 December	Cofidis Cup	Seventh	H	Dender	3–0	Report / Report link; Kick off / 20:30 CET; Referee / (Belgium) Sebastien Delferiere; Anderlecht / Dender; 6', 90' De Sutter; 9' Biglia; (yellow card) 27' Bernárdez / (yellow card) 32' Imschoot
31	27 December	Jupiler Pro League	20	A	Gent	2–2	Report / Report link; Kick off / 18:00 CET; Attendance / 12,919; Referee / (Belgium) Serge Gumienny; Anderlecht / Gent; 61' Legear; 89' De Sutter; (yellow card) 14' Van Damme; (yellow card) 43' Mazuch; (yellow card) 53' Deschacht / 7' Marić; 51' Coulibaly; (yellow card) 29' Hanstveit
32	30 December	Jupiler Pro League	21	H	Zulte Waregem	2–1	Kick off / 20:35 CET; Attendance / 23,195; Referee / (Belgium) Peter Vervecken; Anderlecht / Zulte Waregem; 35', 45+1' De Sutter; (yellow card) 27' Kouyaté; (yellow card) 48' Van Damme; (yellow card) 90+1' Boussoufa / 55' Berrier; (yellow card) 63' Ernemann; (yellow card) 67' Buysse; (yellow card) 89' Nfor
33	17 January	Jupiler Pro League	22	A	Standard Liège	4–0	Kick off / 14:30 CET; Attendance / 27,000; Referee / (Belgium) Johan Verbist; Anderlecht / Standard Liège; 8' Legear; 52' Lukaku; 81' (o.g.) Traore; 83' (o.g.) Mangala; (yellow card) 8' Legear; (yellow card) 24' Gillet; (yellow card) 57' Deschacht; (yellow card) 90+1' Mazuch / (red card) 43' Witsel; (yellow card) 58' Camozzato; (yellow card) 70' Dacourt
34	23 January	Cofidis Cup	QF	H	Cercle Brugge	2–1	Kick off / 20:00 CET; Referee / (Belgium) Stéphane Breda; Anderlecht / Cercle Brugge; 3' (pen.) Boussoufa; 78' Kouyaté; (yellow card) 45' Mazuch / 64' Božović; (yellow card) 3' Sergeant; (yellow card) 50' Kelhar; (yellow card) 55' Evens
35	26 January	Cofidis Cup	QF	A	Cercle Brugge	0–1	Kick off / 20:30 CET; Referee / (Belgium) Claude Bourdouxhe; Anderlecht / Cercle Brugge; (yellow card) 83' Diandy / 5' Božović
36	29 January	Jupiler Pro League	24	A	Germinal Beerschot	5–0	Kick off / 20:30 CET; Referee / (Belgium) Paul Allaerts; Anderlecht / Germinal Beerschot; 11', 75' Lukaku; 45+1' Kanu; 60' Legear; 64' Boussoufa; (yellow card) 69' Van Damme / (yellow card) 45+1' Clement; (yellow card) 61' Mikulić
37	3 February	Jupiler Pro League	19	H	Club Brugge	3–2	Kick off / 20:30 CET; Attendance / 23,800; Referee / (Belgium) Luc Wouters; Anderlecht / Club Brugge; 7' Juhász; 74' Frutos; 90+1' Boussoufa; (yellow card) 41' Boussoufa / 19' Odjidja-Ofoe; 59' Kouemaha; (yellow card) 16' Odjidja-Ofoe; (yellow card) 18' Blondel; (yellow card) 33' Kouemaha; (red card) 64' Boussoufa; (yellow card) 88' Perišić
38	6 February	Jupiler Pro League	25	H	Sint-Truiden	1–2	Kick off / 20:00 CET; Attendance / 23,366; Referee / (Belgium) Stéphane Breda; Anderlecht / Sint-Truiden; 24' Van Damme; (yellow card) 35' Gillet; (yellow card) 89' Van Damme / 30' Delorge; 89' (pen.) Chimedza; (yellow card) 31' Wilmet; (yellow card) 33' Buysens; (yellow card) 52' Delorge
39	18 February	UEFA Europa League	R32	A (Spain)	Athletic Bilbao (Spain)	1–1	Kick off / 21:05 CET; Referee / (Italy) Matteo Trefoloni; Anderlecht / Athletic Bilbao; 35' Biglia; (yellow card) 20' Legear; (yellow card) 34' Juhász; (yellow card) 60' Kouyaté / 58' San José
40	21 February	Jupiler Pro League	27	H	Mechelen	2–0	Kick off / 18:00 CET; Attendance / 23,405; Referee / (Belgium) Serge Gumienny; Anderlecht / Mechelen; 74' Gillet; 76' Lukaku; (yellow card) 39' Juhász / (yellow card) 25' Ivens; (yellow card) 57' Chen; (yellow card) 67' Destorme; (yellow card) 88' Biset
41	25 February	UEFA Europa League	R32	H	Athletic Bilbao (Spain)	4–0	Kick off / 19:00 CET; Referee / (Austria) Thomas Einwaller; Anderlecht / Athletic Bilbao; 4' Lukaku; 27' (o.g.) San José; 49' Juhász; 68' Legear; (yellow card) 8' Deschacht; (yellow card) 43' Proto; (yellow card) 45+2' Boussoufa; (yellow card) 65' Lukaku / (yellow card) 2' San José; (yellow card) 64' Yeste; (yellow card) 65' Amorebieta; (yellow card) 90+2' Martínez
42	28 February	Jupiler Pro League	28	A	Roeselare	2–1	Kick off / 20:30 CET; Referee / (Belgium) Johan Verbist; Anderlecht / Roeselare; 36' Mazuch; 62' Suárez; (yellow card) 24' (yellow-red card) 77' Mazuch; (yellow card) 57' Biglia; (yellow card) 65' Gillet / 25' Rukavytsya; (yellow card) 78' Eyjólfsson; (yellow card) 85' Tomou
43	6 March	Jupiler Pro League	26	A	Charleroi	2–0	Kick off / 18:00 CET; Referee / (Belgium) Jean-Baptist Bultynck; Anderlecht / Charleroi; 17' Suárez; 45+1' De Sutter; (yellow card) 62' Deschacht; (yellow card) 71' Proto; (yellow card) 89' Van Damme / (yellow card) 13' Christ; (yellow card) 42' Kéré
44	11 March	UEFA Europa League	R16	A (Germany)	Hamburger SV (Germany)	1–3	Kick off / 19:00 CET; Referee / (France) Laurent Duhamel; Anderlecht / Hamburger SV; 45' Legear / 23' Mathijsen; 40' van Nistelrooy; 76' Jarolím
45	14 March	Jupiler Pro League	29	H	Genk	2–0	Kick off / 20:00 CET; Attendance / 23,119; Referee / (Netherlands) Bas Nijhuis; Anderlecht / Genk; 52' Lukaku; 89' De Sutter; (yellow card) 40' Boussoufa; (yellow card) 43' Suárez; (yellow card) 44' Biglia / (yellow card) 25' Matoukou; (yellow card) 87' Pudil
46	18 March	UEFA Europa League	R16	H	Hamburger SV (Germany)	4–3	Kick off / 21:05 CET; Attendance / 23,500; Referee / (Norway) Terje Hauge; Anderlecht / Hamburger SV; 45' Lukaku; 45+4' (pen.) Suárez; 60' Biglia; 67' Boussoufa; (yellow card) 26' Van Damme; (yellow card) 73' Suárez / 43' Boateng; 55' Jansen; 76' Petrić; (yellow card) 34' Boateng
47	21 March	Jupiler Pro League	30	A	Lokeren	4–0	Kick off / 20:00 CET; Attendance / 8,352; Referee / (Belgium) Claude Bourdouxhe; Anderlecht / Lokeren; 3' Lukaku; 29' Kouyaté; 59' (o.g.) Gueye; 64' Boussoufa; (yellow card) 31' Juhász; (yellow card) 84' Biglia / (yellow card) 25' Gueye; (yellow card) 31' Overmeire
48	28 March	Jupiler Pro League	Playoff Round 1	H	Zulte Waregem	6–0	Kick off / 20:30 CET; Attendance / 22,000; Referee / (Belgium) Luc Wouters; Anderlecht / Zulte Waregem; 9', 86' Boussoufa; 51' (pen.) Suárez; 57' Van Damme; 79' De Sutter; 83' Gillet
49	31 March	Jupiler Pro League	Playoff Round 2	A	Gent	3–1	Kick off / 20:30 CET; Attendance / 9,830; Referee / (Belgium) Paul Allaerts; Anderlecht / Gent; 11' Boussoufa; 23' Juhász; 40' Gillet / 62' Čustović; (yellow card) 39' Myrie; (yellow card) 66' Thompson
50	3 April	Jupiler Pro League	Playoff Round 3	H	Club Brugge	2–2	Kick off / 20:00 CET; Attendance / 23,279; Referee / (Belgium) Serge Gumienny; Anderlecht / Club Brugge; 16' (o.g.) Donk; 54' Suárez; (yellow card) 60' Van Damme; (yellow card) 61' Suárez / 56' Dirar; 82' Donk; (yellow card) 34' Sonck; (yellow card) 37' Perišić; (yellow card) 54' Stijnen; (yellow card) 84' Lestienne; (red card) 90' Donk
51	9 April	Jupiler Pro League	Playoff Round 4	A	Sint-Truiden	1–1	Kick off / 20:30 CET; Attendance / 10,000; Referee / (Belgium) Jérôme Efong Nzolo; Anderlecht / Sint-Truiden; 30' Boussoufa; (yellow card) 44' Suárez; (yellow card) 61' Juhász / 31' Schouterden; (yellow card) 63' Wagemakers; (yellow card) 75' Delorge
52	14 April	Jupiler Pro League	Playoff Round 5	H	Kortrijk	1–0	Kick off / 20:30 CET; Attendance / 22,250; Referee / (Belgium) Joeri van de Velde; Anderlecht / Kortrijk; 34' Mazuch / (yellow card) 70' de Ly; (yellow card) 87' Benko
53	18 April	Jupiler Pro League	Playoff Round 6	A	Club Brugge	2–1	Kick off / 16:00 CET; Attendance / 25,686; Referee / (Belgium) Johan Verbist; Anderlecht / Club Brugge; 29' Van Damme; 89' Suárez; (yellow card) 41' Saré / 90+3' Sonck; (yellow card) 37' Blondel; (yellow card) 38' Kouemaha; (yellow card) 45' Alcaraz; (yellow card) 72' Dirar; (yellow card) 89' Stijnen
54	25 April	Jupiler Pro League	Playoff Round 7	H	Gent	4–2	Kick off / 20:30 CET; Attendance / 22,762; Referee / (Belgium) Stéphane Breda; Anderlecht / Gent; 3' Van Damme; 14' Suárez; 17' Chatelle; 72' Gillet / 65' Coulibaly; 71' Grondin
55	30 April	Jupiler Pro League	Playoff Round 8	A	Zulte Waregem	0–0	Kick off / 20:30 CET; Attendance / 6,500; Referee / (Belgium) Laurent Colemonts; Anderlecht / Zulte Waregem; (yellow card) 33' Saré / (yellow card) 26' Minne; (yellow card) 28' Van Nieuwenhuyze
56	5 May	Jupiler Pro League	Playoff Round 9	A	Kortrijk	3–1	Kick off / 20:30 CET; Attendance / 6,500; Referee / (Belgium) Philippe Flament; Anderlecht / Kortrijk; 29' Van Damme; 44' Boussoufa; 84' Badibanga; (yellow card) 77' Polák; (yellow card) 78' Bernárdez; (yellow card) 83' (yellow-red card) 86' Badibanga / (yellow card) 50' Benteke
57	8 May	Jupiler Pro League	Playoff Round 10	H	Sint-Truiden	2–1	Kick off / 20:00 CET; Attendance / 22,839; Referee / (Belgium) Paul Allaerts; Anderlecht / Sint-Truiden; 18' Van Damme; 58' Suárez; (yellow card) 23' Chatelle; (yellow card) 54' Van Damme / 72' (pen.) Cantaluppi; (yellow card) 28' Deferm; (red card) 84' Cantaluppi

Last updated: 22 March 2010
Source: sporza.be
^{1}Anderlecht goals come first.
National flags for Ground and Opponent columns are only shown when different from that of Anderlecht.
M = Match; Ground: H = Home, A = Away, N = Neutral, HR = Home replacement, AR = Away replacement.

== See also ==
- List of R.S.C. Anderlecht seasons
