= 2009–10 Belgian Pro League =

107th season of top-tier football in Belgium

Jupiler Pro League
- Season: 2009–10
- Champions: Anderlecht (30th title)
- Relegated: Mouscron; Roeselare
- Champions League: Anderlecht; Gent
- Europa League: Club Brugge; Racing Genk; Cercle Brugge
- Matches: 268
- Goals: 614 (2.29 per match)
- Top goalscorer: Romelu Lukaku (15 goals)
- Biggest home win: Anderlecht 6-0 Zulte-Waregem (28 March 2010)
- Biggest away win: Mouscron 0–5 Lokeren (12 December 2009); Germinal Beerschot 0-5 Anderlecht (29 January 2010)
- Highest scoring: Lokeren 5–3 Cercle (31 March 2010); AA Gent 6-2 Club Brugge (8 May 2010)
- Longest winning run: Anderlecht (9 games) ended 27 December 2010
- Longest unbeaten run: Anderlecht (13 games) ended 6 February 2010
- Longest losing run: K. Sint-Truidense V.V. (7 games) ended 21 November 2009

The 2009–10 season of the Belgian Pro League (also known as Jupiler Pro League for sponsorship reasons) was the 107th season of top-tier football in Belgium. The season began on 31 July 2009 with the first matches of the regular season, and ended in May 2010 with the last matches of the playoff round. Standard Liège were the defending champions.

The competition underwent a significant overhaul for this season by reducing the number of teams and, for the first time in the history of the league, introducing a playoff system to determine the Belgian champions.

On April 18, 2010, Anderlecht became champions as a result of a 1–2 victory in Bruges against one of their main rivals, Club Brugge.

== Changes from 2008–09 ==
=== Structural changes ===
The league size has been reduced from eighteen to sixteen teams. Further, the competition has been split into two stages, a conventional season and playoffs.

The participating clubs will first play a conventional round-robin schedule for a total of 30 matches. After the conclusion of those matches, the team ranked 16th will be directly relegated to the Belgian Second Division, while every other team will play in a playoff round according to its league table position.

The first six teams will play in the Championship playoff. Points earned during the regular season are halved with an odd number of points being rounded up. The round will be played on a round-robin schedule. The winner of this round has won the Belgian championship and will participate in the third qualifying round of the 2010–11 UEFA Champions League. The runners-up will also play in the third qualifying round of the Champions League, while the third-placed team will enter the third qualifying round of the 2010–11 UEFA Europa League. Finally, the fourth-placed team will have to compete in a single match (called Testmatch) against the winner of the Europa League playoff (see below) for one spot in the second qualifying round of the UEFA Europa League.

The teams finishing seventh through fourteenth will play in the Europa League playoff and start with zero points. The round will be played in two groups, with teams in positions 7, 9, 12 and 14 comprising Group A, and the remaining teams comprising Group B. Each group will be played on a round-robin schedule. The winners of these groups will then compete in a two-legged series to earn the right to play against the fourth-placed team of the Championship playoff for one spot in the second qualifying round of the UEFA Europa League.

The 15th-placed team will participate in the Relegation playoff, along with the teams ranked second through fifth in the Belgian Second Division. The winners of the playoff will earn a place in the 2010–11 Belgian First Division.

=== Team changes ===
- Mons and Tubize were relegated.
- Sint-Truiden was promoted.
- Roeselare beat Dender, Lierse and Antwerp in the playoffs and was thus allowed to remain in the league. Dender was relegated while Lierse and Antwerp remained in the second division.

== Team information ==
=== Stadia and locations ===
Location of teams in Belgian First Division 2009-10

Club	Location	Venue	Capacity
R.S.C. Anderlecht	Anderlecht	Constant Vanden Stock Stadium	28,063
Cercle Brugge K.S.V.	Bruges	Jan Breydel Stadium	29,415
R. Charleroi S.C.	Charleroi	Stade du Pays de Charleroi	24,891
Club Brugge K.V.	Bruges	Jan Breydel Stadium	29,415
K.R.C. Genk	Genk	Cristal Arena	24,900
K.A.A. Gent	Ghent	Jules Ottenstadion	12,919
K.F.C. Germinal Beerschot	Antwerp	Olympisch Stadion	12,771
K.V. Kortrijk	Kortrijk	Guldensporen Stadion	9,500
K.S.C. Lokeren Oost-Vlaanderen	Lokeren	Daknamstadion	10,000
KV Mechelen	Mechelen	Veolia Stadium Achter de Kazerne	13,123
R.E. Mouscron	Mouscron	Stade Le Canonnier	11,300
Roeselare	Roeselare	Schiervelde Stadion	9,036
K. Sint-Truidense V.V.	Sint-Truiden	Staaienveld	11,250
Standard Liège	Liège	Stade Maurice Dufrasne	30,000
K.V.C. Westerlo	Westerlo	Het Kuipje	8,200
S.V. Zulte-Waregem	Waregem	Regenboogstadion	8,500

=== Personnel and sponsoring ===
Club	Chairman	Current manager	Team captain	Shirt sponsor
R.S.C. Anderlecht	(Belgium) Roger Vanden Stock	(Belgium) Ariel Jacobs	(Belgium) Olivier Deschacht	BNP Paribas Fortis
Cercle Brugge K.S.V.	(Belgium) Frans Schotte	(Belgium) Glen De Boeck	(Belgium) Denis Viane	A D M B
R. Charleroi S.C.	(Iran) Abbas Bayat	Position Vacant	(France) Adlène Guedioura	VOO
Club Brugge K.V.	(Belgium) Pol Jonckheere	(Netherlands) Adrie Koster	(Belgium) Stijn Stijnen	Dexia
K.R.C. Genk	(Belgium) Harry Lemmens	(Belgium) Franky Vercauteren	(Brazil) João Carlos	Euphony
K.A.A. Gent	(Belgium) Ivan De Witte	(Belgium) Michel Preud'homme	(Belgium) Bernd Thijs	VDK
K.F.C. Germinal Beerschot	(Belgium) Jos Verhaegen	(Belgium) Jos Daerden	(Belgium) Kurt Van Dooren	Quick
K.V. Kortrijk	(Belgium) Jozef Allijns	(Belgium) Georges Leekens	(Belgium) Brecht Verbrugghe	Digipass by VASCO
K.S.C. Lokeren Oost-Vlaanderen	(Belgium) Roger Lambrecht	(Belgium) Emilio Ferrera	(Belgium) Olivier Doll	Edialux
KV Mechelen	(Belgium) Johan Timmermans	(Belgium) Peter Maes	(Belgium) Jonas Ivens	Telenet
R.E. Mouscron	(Belgium) Philippe Dufermont	Position Vacant	(Belgium) Walter Baseggio	Frinver Promotions
K.S.V. Roeselare	(Belgium) Luc Espeel	(Netherlands) Dennis Van Wijk	(Belgium) Stefaan Tanghe	Deceuninck
K. Sint-Truidense V.V.	(Belgium) Roland Duchâtelet	(Belgium) Guido Brepoels	(Belgium) Peter Delorge	Belisol
Standard Liège	(Switzerland) Reto Stiffler	(Belgium) Dominique D'Onofrio	(Belgium) Steven Defour	BASE
K.V.C. Westerlo	(Belgium) Herman Wijnants	(Belgium) Jan Ceulemans	(Belgium) Jef Delen	Willy Naessens
S.V. Zulte-Waregem	(Belgium) Willy Naessens	(Belgium) Francky Dury	(Belgium) Ludwin Van Nieuwenhuyze	Enfinity, Petrus

=== Managerial changes ===
==== During summer break ====
Team	Outgoing manager	Manner of departure	Date of vacancy	Replaced by	Date of appointment	Position in table
Genk	(Belgium) Pierre Denier (Netherlands) Hans Visser (caretakers)	Caretakers replaced	5 March 2009	(Belgium) Hein Vanhaezebrouck	17 May 2009	Pre-Season
Club Brugge	(Belgium) Jacky Mathijssen	Mutual consent	17 May 2009	(Netherlands) Adrie Koster	17 May 2009	Pre-Season
Kortrijk	(Belgium) Hein Vanhaezebrouck	Signed at Genk on 30 March 2009.	17 May 2009	(Belgium) Georges Leekens	28 May 2009	Pre-Season
Charleroi	(Scotland) John Collins	End of contract	17 May 2009	(Belgium) Stéphane Demol	2 June 2009	Pre-Season
Mouscron	(Belgium) Enzo Scifo	Resigned	6 June 2009	(Serbia) Miroslav Đukić	10 June 2009	Pre-Season

==== During the season ====
Team	Outgoing manager	Manner of departure	Date of vacancy	Replaced by	Date of appointment	Position in table
Germinal Beerschot	(Belgium) Aimé Anthuenis	Sacked	31 August 2009	(Belgium) Jos Daerden	3 September 2009	14th
Lokeren	(Serbia) Aleksandar Janković	Sacked	25 October 2009	(Belgium) Jacky Mathijssen	25 October 2009	14th
Mouscron	(Serbia) Miroslav Đukić	Resigned	30 October 2009	(Netherlands) Hans Galjé	2 November 2009	15th
Charleroi	(Belgium) Stéphane Demol	Resigned	31 October 2009	(Scotland) Tommy Craig	20 November 2009	13th
Genk	(Belgium) Hein Vanhaezebrouck	Sacked	29 November 2009	(Belgium) Franky Vercauteren	6 December 2009	12th
Mouscron	(Netherlands) Hans Galjé	Contract annulled by bankruptcy	28 December 2009			10th
Lokeren	(Belgium) Jacky Mathijssen	Mutual consent	25 January 2010	(Belgium) Emilio Ferrera	28 January 2010	15th
Standard Liège	(Romania) László Bölöni	Resigned	10 February 2010	(Belgium) Dominique D'Onofrio	10 February 2010	6th
Charleroi	(Scotland) Tommy Craig	Sacked	14 April 2010	(Belgium) Jacky Mathijssen	4 June 2010	13th (4th in Playoff)

== Regular season ==
=== Financial troubles of Mouscron ===
During the season, Mouscron got into financial trouble. This caused months of debate and several law procedures, with the fate of Mouscron changing from week to week. The board of Mouscron finally accepted the bankruptcy of Mouscron on 28 December 2009. At that point, the last two matches of Mouscron had already been forfeited as many players refused to play due to wages from November and December not being paid; three forfeits in a row would have also caused immediate elimination and relegation to the Belgian Third Division.

As a result of the bankruptcy and relegation, Mouscron's record was expunged.

=== League table ===
Pos	Team	Pld	W	D	L	GF	GA	GD	Pts	Qualification or relegation
1	Anderlecht (C, O)	28	22	3	3	62	20	+42	69	Qualification to Championship play-offs
2	Club Brugge	28	17	6	5	52	33	+19	57	Qualification to Championship play-offs
3	Gent	28	14	7	7	49	30	+19	49	Qualification to Championship play-offs
4	Kortrijk	28	12	9	7	39	30	+9	45	Qualification to Championship play-offs
5	Sint-Truiden	28	12	6	10	35	35	0	42	Qualification to Championship play-offs
6	Zulte Waregem	28	10	11	7	39	32	+7	41	Qualification to Championship play-offs
7	Mechelen	28	12	3	13	36	46	−10	39	Qualification to Europa League play-offs
8	Standard Liège	28	10	9	9	38	34	+4	39	Qualification to Europa League play-offs
9	Cercle Brugge	28	11	5	12	45	40	+5	38	Qualification to Europa League play-offs
10	Germinal Beerschot	28	9	8	11	30	43	−13	35	Qualification to Europa League play-offs
11	Genk (O)	28	8	10	10	33	31	+2	34	Qualification to Europa League play-offs
12	Westerlo	28	8	8	12	28	34	−6	32	Qualification to Europa League play-offs
13	Charleroi	28	5	8	15	28	45	−17	23	Qualification to Europa League play-offs
14	Lokeren	28	5	3	20	22	54	−32	18	Qualification to Europa League play-offs
15	Roeselare (R, Q)	28	4	6	18	29	58	−29	18	Qualification to the Relegation play-offs
16	Mouscron (R)	0	0	0	0	0	0	0	0	Relegation to 2010–11 Belgian Third Division (Note: Mouscron were relegated due to the club's financial problems, which caused them to forfeit three consecutive matches. Their record was expunged.)

Source: soccerway.com
Rules for classification: 1) points; 2) number of matches won; if teams are still tied a playoff is organised.
(C) Champions; (O) Play-off winners; (Q) Qualified for the phase indicated; (R) Relegated

=== Positions by round ===
Note: The classification was made after the weekend (or midweek) of each matchday, so postponed matches were only processed at the time they were played to represent the real evolution in standings. The postponed matches are:

- Matchday 19: Mechelen vs. Germinal Beerschot of 18 December, Charleroi vs. Standard and Anderlecht vs. Club Brugge of 20 December. The matches will be played in the beginning of February, between the 24th and 25th matchday.
- Matchday 22: Club Brugge vs. Westerlo of 16 January which was played during the 24th matchday on 30 January.
- Matchday 23: Cercle Brugge vs. Charleroi of 23 January (as a result of the first leg of the quarter final of the Belgian Cup between Anderlecht and Cercle Brugge being played on this date). The new date for this match is 24 February, between matchdays 27 and 28.
- Matchday 24: Sint-Truiden vs. Westerlo of 30 January (as a result of the postponement of the match Club Brugge vs. Westerlo to this date) is postponed to 3 February, which is between matchdays 24 and 25. Because of snowfall, both Roeselare vs. Genk and Charleroi vs. Lokeren were postponed. The match Charleroi vs. Lokeren was originally scheduled to be played on February 10 between matchdays 25 and 26, but was postponed again because of more snow and will now be played on March 10 between matchdays 28 and 29. Roeselare vs. Genk was rescheduled to 24 February, between matchdays 27 and 28.
- Matchday 26: Yet again snow caused several matches to be postponed, in this case Mechelen-Genk, Cercle Brugge-Lokeren, Charleroi-Anderlecht and Germinal Beerschot-Zulte-Waregem. All matches were rescheduled to be played during the weekend of the 29th matchday, on March 6 and 7.
- Matchday 29: Due to the rescheduling of several matches to the first weekend of March, when this matchday was to be played, the whole matchday was postponed one week. With both Anderlecht and Standard Liège still playing in the UEFA Europa League on Thursdays, all matches will be played on Sunday 14 March at 20:00.
- Matchday 30: With matchday 29 moved to 14 March, matchday 30 was also rescheduled, to Sunday 21 March.

On top of that, the results of Mouscron were annulled between matchdays 20 and 21, causing many shifts between those matchdays. Also, for the rest of the season, there will be no point at which all teams have played the same number of matches, until at the end.

Team ╲ Round	1	2	3	4	5	6	7	8	9	10	11	12	13	14	15	16	17	18	19	20	21	22	23	24	25	26	27	28	29	30
Anderlecht	3	1	1	1	1	3	3	2	1	2	2	2	2	1	1	1	1	1	1	1	1	1	1	1	1	1	1	1	1	1
Club Brugge	4	3	4	5	4	4	4	1	2	1	1	1	1	2	2	2	2	2	2	2	2	2	2	2	2	2	2	2	2	2
Gent	2	1	2	2	3	2	2	5	6	6	7	6	7	6	5	4	4	3	3	3	3	3	3	3	3	3	3	3	3	3
Kortrijk	15	13	12	11	10	7	8	10	14	14	10	11	10	8	8	10	7	6	6	6	8	9	7	8	7	6	4	4	4	4
Sint-Truiden	6	8	6	4	2	1	1	3	3	5	6	8	8	9	9	8	9	10	8	8	6	4	5	5	5	7	5	5	5	5
Zulte Waregem	8	6	9	11	9	12	9	11	7	8	5	5	6	7	6	5	5	5	5	5	5	6	4	4	4	5	6	6	6	6
Mechelen	1	5	3	3	5	6	6	4	5	4	3	3	4	5	7	7	11	9	11	11	9	7	8	9	9	9	9	9	8	7
Standard Liège	6	6	5	6	7	5	5	6	4	3	4	4	3	3	4	6	6	7	7	7	7	8	9	7	6	4	7	7	7	8
Cercle Brugge	14	16	14	10	12	9	11	12	9	10	11	12	13	11	12	13	13	13	12	12	13	11	12	11	11	11	12	11	9	9
Germinal Beerschot	8	8	11	13	14	11	10	7	8	7	8	7	5	4	3	3	3	4	4	4	4	5	6	6	8	8	8	8	10	10
Genk	12	11	10	7	8	10	12	9	11	11	14	10	9	10	11	12	12	12	13	13	11	10	10	10	10	10	10	10	11	11
Westerlo	16	15	16	16	16	15	15	14	13	13	9	9	11	12	10	9	10	11	9	9	10	12	11	12	12	12	11	12	12	12
Charleroi	12	12	8	9	6	8	7	8	10	9	12	13	12	14	14	14	14	14	14	14	12	13	13	13	13	13	13	13	13	13
Lokeren	8	13	15	15	13	14	14	13	12	12	13	14	14	15	15	15	15	15	15	15	14	14	15	15	14	14	15	14	14	14
Roeselare	8	10	13	14	15	16	16	16	16	16	16	16	16	16	16	16	16	16	16	16	15	15	14	14	15	15	14	15	15	15
Mouscron	4	4	6	8	11	13	13	15	15	15	15	15	15	13	13	11	8	8	10	10	16	16	16	16	16	16	16	16	16	16

Source: soccerassociation.com

=== Results ===
Note: All Mouscron results listed below were expunged after the club had to declare bankruptcy during the season. They are listed here for information purposes. Matches which were to be competed after Mouscron's exemption have been shaded.

Home \ Away	AND	CER	CHA	BRU	GNK	GNT	GBA	KVK	LOK	KVM	MOU	ROE	STV	STA	WES	ZWA
Anderlecht		3–2	2–0	3–2	2–0	1–1	1–0	1–0	2–0	2–0		3–1	1–2	1–1	3–0	2–1
Cercle Brugge	1–3		1–0	2–3	1–0	1–3	1–2	1–1	4–0	1–0	5–0 (Note: The matches were awarded to Cercle Brugge and Kortrijk, respectively, as won with a score of 5–0 after Mouscron did not field a team for these matches.)	2–0	3–1	2–0	2–1	2–2
Charleroi	0–2	0–4		1–2	1–3	0–2	1–0	3–3	4–1	1–2		3–0	0–0	2–3	1–1	0–0
Club Brugge	4–2	2–1	1–0		1–1	1–0	1–2	2–2	2–0	1–1		1–0	1–0	2–1	2–1	3–1
Genk	0–2	2–0	1–2	2–0		1–1	1–1	1–1	3–1	1–2	1–2	1–1	0–0	1–0	0–0	2–2
Gent	2–2	3–1	2–1	1–1	2–1		0–1	2–2	4–1	2–1	1–1	5–1	0–1	2–1	1–2	0–2
Germinal Beerschot	0–5	1–4	0–0	1–4	1–0	1–1		1–0	2–1	1–3	3–2	3–0	4–1	1–1	3–1	1–1
Kortrijk	0–2	3–1	2–1	1–4	2–1	1–0	3–0		3–1	2–0	2–2	2–0	0–1	0–2	1–1	1–0
Lokeren	0–4	1–1	4–1	0–1	0–2	0–1	2–0	0–0		2–1	4–1	1–4	1–2	1–3	1–0	1–1
Mechelen	0–2	1–2	1–0	2–1	2–1	2–5	1–0	1–1	2–0		0–1	3–2	0–2	0–0	4–1	2–1
Mouscron	1–2	0–1	4–1	1–1	2–0			0–5	0–5			0–0	2–1	0–0	0–1	
Roeselare	1–2	3–2	1–3	2–3	1–1	0–4	1–1	0–2	1–2	1–2	1–2		1–2	1–5	0–0	2–0
Sint-Truiden	2–1	1–1	0–0	1–1	2–4	1–2	2–0	0–2	2–1	5–2		2–1		2–0	0–1	1–2
Standard Liège	0–4	1–1	1–1	3–1	1–0	0–2	2–2	3–1	2–0	3–0		0–1	2–2		1–0	1–1
Westerlo	0–2	2–1	4–0	1–4	0–1	0–0	1–1	1–1	1–0	2–0		2–2	2–0	2–0		1–2
Zulte Waregem	0–2	1–0	2–2	1–1	2–2	3–1	4–0	0–2	1–0	4–1	3–1	1–1	2–0	1–1	1–0	

Source: Soccerway
Legend: Blue = home team win; Yellow = draw; Red = away team win.

== Championship playoff ==
The points obtained during the regular season were halved (and rounded up) before the start of the playoff. Thus, Anderlecht started with 35 points, Club Brugge with 29, Gent with 25, Kortrijk 23 and both Sint-Truiden and Zulte-Waregem started with 21.

=== Playoff table ===
Pos	Team	Pld	W	D	L	GF	GA	GD	Pts	Qualification
1	Anderlecht (C)	10	7	3	0	24	9	+15	59	Qualification to Champions League third qualifying round
2	Gent	10	4	4	2	20	13	+7	41	Qualification to Champions League third qualifying round
3	Club Brugge	10	3	3	4	14	15	−1	41	Qualification to Europa League play-off round
4	Sint-Truiden	10	3	4	3	9	10	−1	34	Qualification to Europa League Testmatch
5	Kortrijk	10	3	1	6	9	13	−4	33	
6	Zulte Waregem	10	2	1	7	7	23	−16	28	

Rules for classification: 1) points; 2) points after deduction of (possible) half points added due to rounding; 3) number of wins; 4) goal difference; 5) number of goals scored; 6) number of away goals scored; 7) number of away wins.
(C) Champions

=== Positions by round ===
Team ╲ Round	1	2	3	4	5	6	7	8	9	10
Anderlecht	1	1	1	1	1	1	1	1	1	1
Gent	3	3	3	3	3	2	2	3	3	2
Club Brugge	2	2	2	2	2	3	3	2	2	3
Sint-Truiden	5	4	4	4	4	4	4	4	4	4
Kortrijk	4	5	5	5	5	5	5	5	5	5
Zulte Waregem	6	6	6	6	6	6	6	6	6	6

Source: soccerassociation.com

=== Results ===
Home \ Away	AND	BRU	GNT	KVK	STV	ZWA
Anderlecht		2–2	4–2	1–0	2–1	6–0
Club Brugge	1–2		1–1	3–0	2–0	3–0
Gent	1–3	6–2		0–0	0–0	5–0
Kortrijk	1–3	2–0	1–2		1–2	2–0
Sint-Truiden	1–1	0–0	1–1	1–0		1–2
Zulte Waregem	0–0	2–0	1–2	1–2	1–2	

Legend: Blue = home team win; Yellow = draw; Red = away team win.

== Europa League playoff ==
=== Group A ===
Pos	Team	Pld	W	D	L	GF	GA	GD	Pts	Qualification	WES	KVM	CER	LOK
1	Westerlo (A)	6	3	1	2	12	9	+3	10	Playoff Final		0–2	4–1	2–0
2	Mechelen	6	3	1	2	10	8	+2	10		1–3		1–0	3–1
3	Cercle Brugge	6	2	1	3	9	12	−3	7	Qualification for the Europa League second qualifying round	2–0	2–1		1–1
4	Lokeren	6	1	3	2	12	14	−2	6		3–3	2–2	5–3	

Legend: Blue = home team win; Yellow = draw; Red = away team win.
(A) Advance to the Final

=== Group B ===
Pos	Team	Pld	W	D	L	GF	GA	GD	Pts	Qualification	GNK	STA	GBA	CHA
1	Genk (A)	6	5	1	0	12	3	+9	16	Playoff Final		1–0	2–0	3–0
2	Standard	6	2	2	2	8	5	+3	8		1–1		3–0	2–0
3	Germinal Beerschot	6	1	2	3	6	12	−6	5		1–3	2–2		2–2
4	Charleroi	6	1	1	4	4	10	−6	4		1–2	1–0	0–1	

Legend: Blue = home team win; Yellow = draw; Red = away team win.
(A) Advance to the Final

=== Europa League playoff final ===
The winners of both playoff groups will compete in a two-legged match. The winners on aggregate will compete in another match (called Testmatch) against a team from the championship playoff (see below). If both teams are tied after two matches, the away goals rule will be applied. Should both teams still be tied afterwards, thirty minutes of extra time will be played and, if necessary, a penalty shootout will be conducted.

2 May 2010
20:30 CEST

Genk	2 – 2	Westerlo
De Bruyne 84'; Yeboah 90'	Report	Yakovenko 22'; Liliu 62'

Cristal Arena, Genk
Attendance: 18.125
Referee: Paul Allaerts

7 May 2010
20:30 CEST

Westerlo	0 – 3	Genk
	Report	João Carlos 4'; Buffel 71'; Ogunjimi 81'

Het Kuipje, Westerlo
Attendance: 8.200
Referee: Johan Verbist

Genk won 5–2 on aggregate.

=== Testmatches Europa League ===
The fourth-placed team from the championship playoff and the winners of the Europa League playoff competed for one spot in the third qualifying round of the 2010–11 UEFA Europa League.

Note: The spot in the second qualifying round of the 2010–11 UEFA Europa League was taken by Cercle Brugge, who was the runners-up of the 2009–10 Belgian Cup to Champions League-qualified Gent.

13 May 2010
20:30 CEST

Genk	2 – 1	Sint-Truiden
Ogunjimi 19'; Camus 59'	Report	Sidibe 40'

Cristal Arena, Genk
Attendance: 22.183
Referee: Jérôme Efong Nzolo

16 May 2010
20:30 CEST

Sint-Truiden	2 – 3	Genk
Sidibe 6' (pen.); Onana 79'	Report	Ogunjimi 21'; Barda 44'; Buffel 56'

Staaienveld, Sint-Truiden
Referee: Johan Verbist

Genk won 5–3 on aggregate.

== Goalscorers ==
The list of goalscorers is split up: first there is the list of goalscorers during the regular competition, deciding the official title of league 'topscorer', which was won by Romelu Lukaku. After this, the goalscorers in the play-offs are listed below in a second list. Because not all teams get equal matches in the playoffs, the goals during the playoffs did not count to determine the top scorer and therefore there are two separate lists.

=== Regular competition ===
==== Top goalscorers ====
Position	Player	Club	Goals
1	(Belgium) Romelu Lukaku	Anderlecht	15
2	(Cameroon) Dorge Kouemaha	Club Brugge	13
2	(Senegal) Ibrahim Sidibe	Sint-Truiden	13
4	(France) Teddy Chevalier	Zulte Waregem	12
4	(France) Cyril Théréau	Charleroi	12
6	(Poland) Dawid Janczyk	Lokeren (9) and Germinal Beerschot (2)	11
7	(Serbia) Milan Jovanović	Standard Liège	10
8	(Belgium) Christian Benteke	Kortrijk	9
8	(Morocco) Mbark Boussoufa	Anderlecht	9
8	(Senegal) Elimane Coulibaly	Gent	9
8	(Republic of Ireland) Dominic Foley	Cercle Brugge	9
8	(Belgium) Faris Haroun	Germinal Beerschot	9
13	6 players		8
19	5 players		7
24	11 players		6
35	11 players		5
46	17 players		4
63	19 players		3
82	38 players		2
120	60 players		1
Own goals			12
Total goals			614
Total games			228
Average per game			2.69

==== Other scorers ====
8 goals (6 players)

- (Mali) Mahamadou Dissa (Roeselare)
- (France) Julien Gorius (Mechelen)
- (Ukraine) Oleg Iachtchouk (Cercle Brugge)
- (The Gambia) Ibou (Kortrijk)
- (Bahrain) Jaycee (Mouscron)
- (Cameroon) Aloys Nong (Mechelen)

7 goals (5 players)

- (Belgium) David de Storme (Mechelen)
- (Belgium) Tom De Sutter (Anderlecht)
- (Ukraine) Aleksandr Jakovenko (Westerlo)
- (France) Chris Makiese (Zulte Waregem)
- (Belgium) Marvin Ogunjimi (Genk)

6 goals (11 players)

- (Nigeria) Joseph Akpala (Club Brugge)
- (Belgium) Thomas Buffel (Cercle Brugge (2) and Genk (4))
- (Zimbabwe) Cephas Chimedza (Sint-Truiden)
- (Belgium) Dieter Dekelver (Westerlo)
- (Serbia) Miloš Marić (Gent)
- (Croatia) Ivan Perišić (Club Brugge)
- (Belgium) Kevin Roelandts (Zulte Waregem)
- (Belgium) Wesley Sonck (Club Brugge)
- (Argentina) Matías Suárez (Anderlecht)
- (Iceland) Bjarni Viðarsson (Roeselare)
- (Belgium) Jelle Vossen (Genk (0) and Cercle Brugge (6))

5 goals (11 players)

- (Costa Rica) Randall Azofeifa (Gent)
- (Croatia) Leon Benko (Kortrijk)
- (Belgium) Mehdi Carcela-Gonzalez (Standard Liège)
- (Bosnia and Herzegovina) Adnan Čustović (Gent)
- (Nigeria) Tosin Dosunmu (Germinal Beerschot)
- (Belgium) Karel Geraerts (Club Brugge)
- (Central African Republic) Habib Habibou (Charleroi)
- (Hungary) Roland Juhász (Anderlecht)
- (Senegal) Mbaye Leye (Gent)
- (Hungary) Dániel Tőzsér (Genk)
- (Belgium) Axel Witsel (Standard Liège)

4 goals (17 players)

- (France) Franck Berrier (Zulte Waregem)
- (Croatia) Mario Carević (Lokeren)
- (Belgium) Davy De Beule (Kortrijk)
- (Belgium) Igor De Camargo (Standard Liège)
- (Belgium) Joeri Dequevy (Roeselare)
- (Netherlands) Samir El Gaaouiri (Roeselare)
- (Belgium) Jonathan Legear (Anderlecht)
- (Netherlands) Sherjill MacDonald (Germinal Beerschot)
- (Democratic Republic of the Congo) Dieumerci Mbokani (Standard Liège)
- (Belgium) Vadis Odjidja-Ofoe (Club Brugge)
- (Brazil) Reynaldo (Anderlecht (0) and Cercle Brugge (4))
- (Australia) Nikita Rukavytsya (Roeselare)
- (Bosnia and Herzegovina) Sulejman Smajić (Lokeren)
- (Cameroon) Bertin Tomou (Westerlo (3) and Roeselare (1))
- (Venezuela) Ronald Vargas (Club Brugge)
- (Belgium) Jonathan Wilmet (Sint-Truiden)
- (Belgium) Stef Wils (Gent)

3 goals (19 players)

- (Israel) Elyaniv Barda (Genk)
- (Belgium) Frederik Boi (Cercle Brugge)
- (Tunisia) Fabien Camus (Genk)
- (Belgium) Steven de Petter (Westerlo)
- (Belgium) Stijn De Smet (Gent)
- (Belgium) Karel D'Haene (Zulte Waregem)
- (Belgium) Peter Delorge (Sint-Truiden)
- (Belgium) Vincent Euvrard (Sint-Truiden)
- (Belgium) Bernt Evens (Westerlo)
- (Argentina) Nicolás Frutos (Anderlecht)
- (Germany) Torben Joneleit (Genk)
- (Belgium) Christophe Lepoint (Gent)
- (Belgium) Maxime Lestienne (Mouscron (3) and Club Brugge (0))
- (Slovenia) Zlatan Ljubijankič (Gent)
- (Syria) Sanharib Malki (Germinal Beerschot (2) and Lokeren (1))
- (Czech Republic) Ondřej Mazuch (Anderlecht)
- (Bosnia and Herzegovina) Adnan Mravac (Westerlo)
- (Venezuela) Roberto Rosales (Gent)
- (Croatia) Tomo Šokota (Lokeren)

2 goals (38 players)

- (Spain) Jonathan Aspas (Mouscron)
- (France) Karim Belhocine (Kortrijk)
- (Belgium) Maxime Biset (Mechelen)
- (Montenegro) Bojan Božović (Cercle Brugge)
- (Brazil) João Carlos (Genk)
- (Peru) Daniel Chávez (Club Brugge)
- (France) Grégory Christ (Charleroi)
- (Belgium) Laurent Ciman (Kortrijk)
- (Belgium) Philippe Clement (Germinal Beerschot)
- (Ivory Coast) Cyriac (Standard Liège)
- (Algeria) Mohamed Dahmane (Club Brugge)
- (France) Wilfried Dalmat (Standard Liège)
- (Morocco) Nabil Dirar (Club Brugge)
- (Belgium) Olivier Doll (Lokeren)
- (Brazil) Ederson (Genk (0) and Charleroi (2))
- (Denmark) Steffen Ernemann (Zulte Waregem)
- (Belgium) Guillaume François (Mouscron (2) and Germinal Beerschot (0))
- (Belgium) Guillaume Gillet (Anderlecht)
- (Senegal) Ibrahima Gueye (Lokeren)
- (Senegal) Moussa Koita (Genk)
- (France) Robert Maah (Mouscron)
- (Democratic Republic of the Congo) Marcel Mbayo (Lokeren)
- (Belgium) Mohamed Messoudi (Kortrijk)
- (Spain) Carlos Moreno (Mouscron)
- (Belgium) Geoffrey Mujangi Bia (Charleroi)
- (Belgium) Joachim Mununga (Mechelen)
- (Montenegro) Stefan Nikolić (Roeselare)
- (Zimbabwe) Vuza Nyoni (Cercle Brugge)
- (Cameroon) Hervé Onana (Sint-Truiden)
- (Morocco) Abdelmajid Oulmers (Charleroi)
- (Belgium) Anthony Portier (Cercle Brugge)
- (Belgium) Mats Rits (Germinal Beerschot)
- (Ukraine) Serhiy Serebrennikov (Cercle Brugge)
- (Belgium) Bernd Thijs (Gent)
- (Belgium) Jelle Van Damme (Anderlecht)
- (Belgium) Romeo Van Dessel (Mechelen)
- (Belgium) Ludwin Van Nieuwenhuyze (Zulte Waregem)
- (Belgium) David Vandenbroeck (Charleroi (0) and Kortrijk (2))

1 goal (60 players)

- (Paraguay) Antolin Alcaraz (Club Brugge)
- (Brazil) Alex (Sint-Truiden)
- (Belgium) Arnor Angeli (Standard Liège)
- (Argentina) Lucas Biglia (Anderlecht)
- (France) Maxime Brillault (Charleroi)
- (Belgium) Yoni Buyens (Mechelen)
- (Belgium) Brecht Capon (Kortrijk)
- (Morocco) Issame Charaï (Sint-Truiden)
- (Burkina Faso) Cédric Ciza (Anderlecht (0) and Charleroi (1))
- (Belgium) Alessandro Cordaro (Charleroi)
- (Belgium) Hans Cornelis (Cercle Brugge)
- (Colombia) Daniel Cruz (Germinal Beerschot)
- (Belgium) Koen Daerden (Club Brugge (0) and Standard Liège (1))
- (Belgium) Kevin De Bruyne (Genk)
- (Belgium) Steven Defour (Standard Liège)
- (Belgium) Jef Delen (Westerlo)
- (Bosnia and Herzegovina) Boubacar Dialiba (Mechelen)
- (Netherlands) Ryan Donk (Club Brugge)
- (Morocco) Chemcedine El Araichi (Mouscron)
- (Morocco) Hassan El Mouataz (Lokeren)
- (Belgium) Rachid Farssi (Westerlo)
- (Brazil) Felipe (Standard Liège)
- (Belgium) Jimmy Hempte (Kortrijk)
- (Ghana) Abdul-Yakuni Iddi (Mechelen)
- (Belgium) Jonas Ivens (Mechelen)
- (Brazil) Kanu (Anderlecht)
- (Slovenia) Dejan Kelhar (Cercle Brugge)
- (Burkina Faso) Mahamoudou Kéré (Charleroi)
- (Senegal) Cheikhou Kouyaté (Anderlecht)
- (Belgium) Sven Kums (Kortrijk)
- (Croatia) Ivan Leko (Germinal Beerschot (0) and Lokeren (1))
- (Brazil) Ellenton Liliu (Westerlo)
- (Denmark) Emil Lyng (Zulte Waregem)
- (France) Eliaquim Mangala (Standard Liège)
- (Belgium) Stijn Meert (Zulte Waregem)
- (Croatia) Tomislav Mikulić (Standard Liège (0) and Germinal Beerschot (1))
- (Bosnia and Herzegovina) Damir Mirvić (Roeselare)
- (Belgium) Jarno Molenberghs (Westerlo)
- (Cameroon) Ernest Nfor (Zulte Waregem)
- (Belgium) Denis Odoi (Sint-Truiden)
- (Brazil) Orlando (Charleroi (0) and Genk (1))
- (Serbia) Nebojša Pavlović (Kortrijk)
- (Belgium) Luigi Pieroni (Gent)
- (Belgium) Sébastien Pocognoli (Standard Liège)
- (Belgium) Giuseppe Rossini (Mechelen)
- (Finland) Berat Sadik (Zulte Waregem)
- (Belgium) Nils Schouterden (Sint-Truiden)
- (Belgium) Tony Sergeant (Cercle Brugge)
- (Belgium) Tim Smolders (Gent)
- (Belgium) Tom Soetaers (Kortrijk (0) and Mechelen (1))
- (France) Jérémy Taravel (Zulte Waregem)
- (Democratic Republic of the Congo) Bavon Tshibuabua (Germinal Beerschot)
- (Belgium) Glenn Van Asten (Westerlo)
- (Belgium) Günther Vanaudenaerde (Westerlo)
- (Belgium) Daan van Gijseghem (Mouscron (1) and Club Brugge (0))
- (Belgium) Joris Van Hout (Westerlo)
- (Belgium) Marc Wagemakers (Sint-Truiden)
- (Poland) Marcin Wasilewski (Anderlecht)
- (Ghana) Samuel Yeboah (Genk)
- (Israel) Yoav Ziv (Lokeren)

Own goals (12 players, 12 goals)

- (Belgium) Frederik Boi (Cercle Brugge, goal scored for Anderlecht)
- (Belgium) Steve Colpaert (Zulte Waregem, goal scored for Mechelen)
- (Republic of Ireland) Dominic Foley (Cercle Brugge, goal scored for Genk)
- (France) Eliaquim Mangala (Standard Liège, goal scored for Anderlecht)
- (Cameroon) Eric Matoukou (Genk, goal scored for Mouscron)
- (Belgium) Anthony Portier (Cercle Brugge, goal scored for Kortrijk)
- (Venezuela) Roberto Rosales (Gent, goal scored for Kortrijk)
- (Belgium) Jurgen Sierens (Roeselare, goal scored for Anderlecht)
- (Brazil) Tiago Silva (Genk, goal scored for Zulte Waregem)
- (Ivory Coast) Moussa Traoré (Standard Liège, goal scored for Anderlecht)
- (Belgium) Jelle Van Damme (Anderlecht, goal scored for Club Brugge)
- (Belgium) Bram Vandenbussche (Roeselare, goal scored for Kortrijk)

=== Playoff goalscorers ===
==== Championship playoff ====
30 games, 83 goals (2.77 per game)

5 goals (4 players)

- (Belgium) Christian Benteke (Kortrijk)
- (Morocco) Mbark Boussoufa (Anderlecht)
- (Argentina) Matías Suárez (Anderlecht)
- (Belgium) Jelle Van Damme (Anderlecht)

4 goals (1 player)

- (Bosnia and Herzegovina) Adnan Čustović (Gent)

3 goals (6 players)

- (Belgium) Davy De Beule (Kortrijk)
- (Belgium) Guillaume Gillet (Anderlecht)
- (Cameroon) Dorge Kouemaha (Club Brugge)
- (Belgium) Christophe Lepoint (Gent)
- (Cameroon) Ernest Nfor (Zulte Waregem)
- (Croatia) Ivan Perišić (Club Brugge)

2 goals (9 players)

- (Costa Rica) Randall Azofeifa (Gent)
- (Senegal) Elimane Coulibaly (Gent)
- (Belgium) Peter Delorge (Sint-Truiden)
- (Morocco) Nabil Dirar (Club Brugge)
- (Morocco) Yassine El Ghanassy (Gent)
- (France) Christophe Grondin (Gent)
- (Senegal) Mbaye Leye (Gent)
- (Belgium) Kevin Roelandts (Zulte Waregem)
- (Cameroon) Sébastien Siani (Sint-Truiden)

1 goal (20 players)

- (Nigeria) Joseph Akpala (Club Brugge)
- (Belgium) Ziguy Badibanga (Anderlecht)
- (Belgium) Ludovic Buysens (Sint-Truiden)
- (Belgium) Bart Buysse (Zulte Waregem)
- (Switzerland) Mario Cantaluppi (Zulte Waregem)
- (Belgium) Thomas Chatelle (Anderlecht)
- (Belgium) Tom De Sutter (Anderlecht)
- (Belgium) Peter Delorge (Sint-Truiden)
- (Netherlands) Ryan Donk (Club Brugge)
- (Hungary) Roland Juhász (Anderlecht)
- (Belgium) Maxime Lestienne (Club Brugge)
- (Slovenia) Zlatan Ljubijankič (Gent)
- (Czech Republic) Ondřej Mazuch (Anderlecht)
- (Belgium) Luigi Pieroni (Gent)
- (Belgium) Nils Schouterden (Sint-Truiden)
- (Belgium) Jeroen Simaeys (Club Brugge)
- (Belgium) Wesley Sonck (Club Brugge)
- (France) Jérémy Taravel (Zulte Waregem)
- (Belgium) Bernd Thijs (Gent)
- (Belgium) David Vandenbroeck (Kortrijk)

Own goals (2 players, 3 goals)

- (Belgium) Miguel Dachelet (2) (Zulte Waregem, goals scored for Sint-Truiden and Club Brugge)
- (Netherlands) Ryan Donk (Club Brugge, goal scored for Anderlecht)

==== Europa League Playoff ====
24 games, 73 goals (3.04 per game)

5 goals (1 player)

- (Republic of Ireland) Dominic Foley (Cercle Brugge)

4 goals (1 player)

- (Israel) Elyaniv Barda (Genk)

3 goals (3 players)

- (France) Julien Gorius (Mechelen)
- (Brazil) Ellenton Liliu (Westerlo)
- (Democratic Republic of the Congo) Dieumerci Mbokani (Standard Liège)

2 goals (12 players)

- (Belgium) Lens Annab (Westerlo)
- (Belgium) Igor De Camargo (Standard Liège)
- (Colombia) Daniel Cruz (Germinal Beerschot)
- (Israel) Omer Golan (Lokeren)
- (Belgium) Faris Haroun (Germinal Beerschot)
- (Ukraine) Aleksandr Jakovenko (Westerlo)
- (Belgium) Joachim Mununga (Mechelen)
- (Belgium) Marvin Ogunjimi (Genk)
- (Belgium) Killian Overmeire (Lokeren)
- (Belgium) Tom Soetaers (Mechelen)
- (Croatia) Tomo Šokota (Lokeren)
- (Ghana) Samuel Yeboah (Genk)

1 goal (31 players)

- (Belgium) Maxime Biset (Mechelen)
- (Belgium) Frederik Boi (Cercle Brugge)
- (Belgium) Thomas Buffel (Genk)
- (Tunisia) Fabien Camus (Genk)
- (France) Grégory Christ (Charleroi)
- (Belgium) Alessandro Cordaro (Charleroi)
- (Belgium) Hans Cornelis (Cercle Brugge)
- (Belgium) Kevin De Bruyne (Genk)
- (Belgium) Steven de Petter (Westerlo)
- (Croatia) Antun Dunković (Mechelen)
- (Senegal) Ibrahima Gueye (Lokeren)
- (Ukraine) Oleg Iachtchouk (Cercle Brugge)
- (Poland) Dawid Janczyk (Germinal Beerschot)
- (Croatia) Ivan Leko (Lokeren)
- (Syria) Sanharib Malki (Lokeren)
- (Cameroon) Eric Matoukou (Genk)
- (Belgium) Benjamin Mokulu (Lokeren)
- (Belgium) Andréa Mbuyi-Mutombo (Standard Liège)
- (Cameroon) Aloys Nong (Mechelen)
- (France) Jérémy Perbet (Lokeren)
- (Colombia) Jaime Alfonso Ruiz (Westerlo)
- (Belgium) Tony Sergeant (Cercle Brugge)
- (Belgium) Jérémy Serwy (Charleroi)
- (France) Cyril Théréau (Charleroi)
- (Ivory Coast) Moussa Traoré (Standard Liège)
- (Belgium) Katuku Tshimanga (Lokeren)
- (Belgium) Joris Van Hout (Westerlo)
- (Belgium) Nico Van Kerckhoven (Westerlo)
- (Belgium) Günther Vanaudenaerde (Westerlo)
- (Cameroon) Justice Wamfor (Germinal Beerschot)
- (Belgium) Axel Witsel (Standard Liège)

Source: sporza.be and Sport.be(in Dutch)

== Season statistics ==
Regular competition records beaten or equalized during playoff games are listed as such.

=== Scoring ===
- First goal of the season: Cephas Chimedza for Sint-Truiden against Standard Liège, 24 minutes (31 July 2009).
- First own goal of the season: Frederik Boi (Cercle Brugge) for Anderlecht, (8 August 2009).
- First hat-trick of the season: Milan Jovanović for Standard Liège against Roeselare (15 August 2009).
- First penalty kick of the season: Axel Witsel (missed) for Standard Liège against Sint-Truiden, 90 minutes (31 July 2009).
- Fastest goal in a match: 58 seconds – Sherjill MacDonald for Germinal Beerschot against Roeselare (28 November 2009).
- Goal scored at the latest point in a match: 90+7 minutes – Arnor Angeli for Standard Liège against Kortrijk (26 September 2009).
- Winning goal scored at the latest point in a match: 90+4 minutes - Cyril Théréau for Charleroi against Germinal Beerschot (16 August 2009)

Widest winning margin: 5 Goals

- Mouscron 0–5 Lokeren (12 December 2009).
- Germinal Beerschot 0–5 Anderlecht (29 January 2010).
- Playoffs: 6 goals - Anderlecht 6-0 Zulte Waregem (28 March 2010)
- Playoffs: AA Gent 5-0 Zulte Waregem (18 April 2010)

Most goals in a match by one team: 5 Goals

- Roeselare 1-5 Standard Liège (15 August 2009)
- AA Gent 5-1 Roeselare (12 September 2009)
- KV Mechelen 2-5 AA Gent (4 December 2009)
- Mouscron 0–5 Lokeren (12 December 2009)
- Sint-Truiden 5-2 KV Mechelen (26 December 2009)
- Germinal Beerschot 0–5 Anderlecht (29 January 2010).
- Playoffs: 6 goals - Anderlecht 6-0 Zulte Waregem (28 March 2010)
- Playoffs: Lokeren 5-3 Cercle Brugge (31 March 2010)
- Playoffs: AA Gent 5-0 Zulte Waregem (18 April 2010)
- Playoffs: 6 goals - AA Gent 6-2 Club Brugge (8 May 2010)

Most goals in one half: 5 goals

- AA Gent 5-1 Roeselare (1-0 at half-time) (12 September 2009)
- Sint-Truiden 5-2 KV Mechelen (3-2 at half-time) (26 December 2009)
- Charleroi 2-3 Standard Liège (0-0 at half-time) (4 February 2010)
- Playoffs: 6 goals - Lokeren 3-3 Westerlo (0-0 at half-time) (10 April 2010)
- Playoffs: Anderlecht 6-0 Zulte Waregem (1-0 at half-time) (28 March 2010)
- Playoffs: Lokeren 5-3 Cercle Brugge (2-1 at half-time) (31 March 2010)

Most goals in one half by a single team: 4 goals

- AA Gent 5-1 Roeselare (12 September 2009)
- Germinal Beerschot 4-1 Sint-Truiden (7 November 2009)
- Roeselare 0-4 AA Gent (30 December 2009)
- Westerlo 4-0 Charleroi (20 February 2010)
- Playoffs: 5 goals - Anderlecht 6-0 Zulte Waregem (28 March 2010)
- Playoffs: AA Gent 6-2 Club Brugge (8 May 2010)

Most goals in a match by one player: 3 goals

- Milan Jovanović for Standard Liège against Roeselare (15 August 2009).
- Dawid Janczyk for Lokeren against Mouscron (12 December 2009).
- Elimane Coulibaly for AA Gent against Roeselare (30 December 2009)
- Cyril Théréau for Charleroi against Lokeren (10 March 2010)

=== Discipline ===
- First yellow card of the season: Marc Wagemakers for Sint-Truiden against Standard Liège, 28 minutes (31 July 2009).
- First red card of the season: Ibrahima Gueye for Lokeren against Zulte Waregem, 22 minutes (1 August 2009).
- Card given at latest point in a game: Bojan Jorgacevic (yellow) at 90+5 minutes for AA Gent against Racing Genk (15 August 2009)
- Most yellow cards in a single match: 9
  - Zulte Waregem 2-2 Racing Genk - 4 for Zulte Waregem (Bossut, D'Haene, Roelandts and NFor), 5 for Racing Genk (Verhulst, João Carlos (2), Tòth and Koita) (8 August 2009)
  - AA Gent 2-1 KV Mechelen - 3 for AA Gent (Thompson, Suler and Maric), 6 for KV Mechelen (Van Hoevelen, Persoons (2), Mununga, Vrancken and Ghomsi) (9 August 2009)
  - Sint-Truiden 2-0 Standard Liège - 3 for Sint-Truiden (Delorge, Alex and Onana), 6 for Standard Liège (Goreux, Ramos, Nicaise, Carcela-González, Jovanović and De Camargo) (29 November 2009)
  - Playoffs: 10 - Kortrijk 1-2 AA Gent - 6 for Kortrijk (Capon, Vandenbroeck, Pavlović, Kums and Vrancken (2)), 4 for AA Gent (Leye, Ljubijankič, Lepoint and Rosales) (28 March 2010)
  - Playoffs: Zulte Waregem 2-0 Club Brugge - 5 for Zulte Waregem (Buysse, Meert, Ernemann, Matton and Hyland), 4 for Club Brugge (Alcaraz, Blondel, Odjidja and Kouemaha) (14 April 2010)
  - Playoffs: 11 - Sint-Truiden 1-1 AA Gent - 4 for Sint-Truiden (Euvrard, Mennes (2), and Onana), 7 for AA Gent (Leye, Myrie, Smolders (2), Čustović, Coulibaly and El Ghanassy) (5 May 2010)
  - Playoffs: Zulte Waregem 1-2 Kortrijk - 4 for Zulte Waregem (Colpaert, Meert, Ernemann and NFor), 5 for Kortrijk (Hempte, De Beule, Belhocine, Benteke and Messoudi) (8 May 2010)

Source: sporza.be and Sport.be(in Dutch)

== Attendances ==
No.	Club	Average attendance	Change	Highest
1	Standard de Liège	24,406	-5,8%	30,000
2	Club Brugge	24,368	-6,6%	28,151
3	Anderlecht	23,054	-2,5%	24,000
4	Genk	19,604	-10,9%	21,468
5	Mechelen	11,654	5,2%	12,931
6	Gent	10,719	0,8%	13,000
7	Germinal Beerschot	9,109	-8,9%	12,000
8	Cercle Brugge	8,833	-15,9%	22,000
9	STVV	8,553	25,8%	12,000
10	Charleroi	7,545	-18,6%	17,170
11	Zulte Waregem	6,820	2,1%	8,503
12	Kortrijk	6,791	7,7%	9,393
13	Roeselare	6,135	11,0%	8,000
14	Sporting Lokeren	5,835	-4,7%	8,352
15	Westerlo	5,539	-7,4%	8,200
16	Mouscron	4,851	-13,9%	8,136

== See also ==
- 2009–10 in Belgian football
- List of Belgian football transfers summer 2009
