= 2011–12 KRC Genk season =

Genk
2011–12 season
- Manager: Franky Vercauteren (until 18 August 2011); Pierre Denier (caretaker, from 18 August 2011 to 30 August 2011); Mario Been (from 30 August 2011)
- Stadium: Cristal Arena
- Belgian Pro League: 3rd
- Belgian Cup: Seventh round
- Belgian Super Cup: Winners
- UEFA Champions League: Group stage
- Top goalscorer: League: Jelle Vossen (21)
- Biggest win: 5–0 v OH Leuven (Home, 28 January 2012, Belgian Pro League)
- Biggest defeat: 0–7 v Valencia (Away, 23 November 2011, UEFA Champions League)
Home colours	Away colours	Third colours

The 2011–12 season was Koninklijke Racing Club Genk's 16th consecutive season in the Belgian Pro League and 24th season in existence as a football club. In addition to the domestic league, Genk participated in the Belgian Cup, the Belgian Super Cup and the UEFA Champions League.

== Squad ==
Squad at end of season

Note: Flags indicate national team as defined under FIFA eligibility rules; some limited exceptions apply. Players may hold more than one non-FIFA nationality.

No.	Pos.	Nation	Player
2	DF	ARG	Abel Masuero
3	DF	BEL	Derrick Tshimanga
4	DF	GER	Torben Joneleit
5	DF	ARG	Leandro Grimi
6	DF	BEL	David Hubert
7	MF	TRI	Khaleem Hyland
8	MF	HUN	Dániel Tőzsér
9	FW	BEL	Jelle Vossen
11	DF	BEL	Anthony Vanden Borre
14	MF	BEL	Kevin De Bruyne
15	MF	FRA	Fabien Camus
16	DF	RSA	Anele Ngcongca
17	DF	BEL	Jeroen Simaeys
18	FW	ISR	Elyaniv Barda
19	MF	BEL	Thomas Buffel
20	DF	BRA	Nadson
21	MF	BDI	Dugary Ndabashinze
22	FW	BEL	Leandro Trossard
23	GK	BEL	Logan Bailly

No.	Pos.	Nation	Player
24	DF	BEL	Timothy Durwael
25	FW	BEL	Christian Benteke
26	GK	HUN	László Köteles
27	MF	NGA	Kennedy Ugoala Nwanganga
28	MF	BEL	Stef Peeters
32	GK	BEL	Gilles Lentz
33	DF	SEN	Mohamed Sarr
35	MF	BEL	Anthony Limbombe
36	FW	KEN	Ayub Masika
37	DF	BEL	Jordy Croux
38	FW	BEL	Leo Njengo
41	MF	BEL	Jaouad Emaankaf
42	DF	BEL	Jentl Gaethofs
43	MF	BEL	Pieter Gerkens
45	MF	BEL	Muhammed Mert
47	DF	BEL	Willem Ofori-Appiah
49	DF	BEL	Frederik Spruyt
52	DF	NED	Sandy Walsh
53	GK	BEL	Stijn Wertelaers

== Competitions ==
=== Overview ===
Competition	First match	Last match	Starting round	Final position	Record							
Competition	First match	Last match	Starting round	Final position	Pld	W	D	L	GF	GA	GD	Win %
Belgian Pro League	30 July 2011	13 May 2012	Matchday 1	3rd	40	19	7	14	79	63	+16	47.50
Belgian Cup	21 September 2011	26 October 2011	Sixth round	Seventh round	2	1	0	1	6	4	+2	50.00
Belgian Super Cup	21 July 2011		Final	Winners	1	1	0	0	1	0	+1	100.00
UEFA Champions League	13 September 2011	6 December 2011	Third qualifying round	Group stage	10	2	4	4	8	21	−13	20.00
Total					53	23	11	19	94	88	+6	43.40

Source: Competitions

=== Belgian Pro League ===
==== Regular season ====
===== League table =====
Pos	Team	Pld	W	D	L	GF	GA	GD	Pts	Qualification
3	Gent	30	17	5	8	63	35	+28	56	Qualification to Championship play-offs
4	Standard Liège	30	14	9	7	43	33	+10	51	Qualification to Championship play-offs
5	Genk	30	13	7	10	60	44	+16	46	Qualification to Championship play-offs
6	Kortrijk	30	13	7	10	39	36	+3	46	Qualification to Championship play-offs
7	Cercle Brugge	30	13	7	10	36	37	−1	46	Qualification to Europa League play-offs

Source: soccerway.com
Rules for classification: 1) points; 2) number of matches won; if teams are still tied a playoff is organised.

===== Results summary =====
Overall								Home						Away					
Pld	W	D	L	GF	GA	GD	Pts	W	D	L	GF	GA	GD	W	D	L	GF	GA	GD
30	13	7	10	60	44	+16	46	10	3	2	36	11	+25	3	4	8	24	33	−9

Source: Soccerway

===== Results by round =====
Round	1	2	3	4	5	6	7	8	9	10	11	12	13	14	15	16	17	18	19	20	21	22	23	24	25	26	27	28	29	30
Ground	H	A	H	A	H	A	H	A	H	A	H	A	H	H	A	A	H	A	H	A	H	A	H	A	H	A	H	A	A	H
Result	W	D	D	L	D	W	W	D	L	L	W	W	D	W	L	L	W	D	W	D	W	L	W	L	L	W	W	L	L	W
Position	2	3	5	9	9	8	6	5	8	9	8	6	7	6	7	8	7	7	6	7	5	6	6	6	7	6	6	6	6	5
Points	3	4	5	5	6	9	12	13	13	13	16	19	20	23	23	23	26	27	30	31	34	34	37	37	37	40	43	43	43	46

Source: Worldfootball.net
A = Away; H = Home; W = Win; D = Draw; L = Loss

===== Matches =====
30 July 2011 1	Genk	3–1	Beerschot	Genk
20:00 CEST (UTC+2)	Joneleit (yellow card) 14'; Mikulić 20' (o.g.); Barda 32'; Hubert 36'	Report	Kagelmacher 75' (pen.)	Stadium: Cristal Arena

6 August 2011 2	Lierse	0–0	Genk	Lier
20:00 CEST (UTC+2)	Saidi (yellow card) 90'	Report	Ngcongca (yellow card) 65'; Vossen (yellow card) 82'	Stadium: Herman Vanderpoortenstadion

13 August 2011 3	Genk	2–2	Zulte Waregem	Genk
20:00 CEST (UTC+2)	Nadson (yellow card) 40'; Joneleit (yellow card) 43', (goal) 84'; Barda (yellow card) 45'; Vossen (yellow card) 66', (goal) 76'	Report	Maréval (yellow card) 38', (goal) 88'; Milunović (yellow card) 54'; Matton 67'; Chevalier (yellow card) 81'	Stadium: Cristal Arena

20 August 2011 4	Cercle Brugge	3–2	Genk	Bruges
20:00 CEST (UTC+2)	Janssens 10', 26'; Rudy 76', (yellow card) 81'	Report	Viane 15' (o.g.), 57' (o.g.); Ngcongca (yellow card) 19'; Camus (red card) 25'; Pudil (yellow card) 81'	Stadium: Jan Breydel Stadium

27 August 2011 5	Genk	0–0	Mechelen	Genk
18:00 CEST (UTC+2)	Barda (yellow card) 33'	Report	Chen (yellow card) 23'	Stadium: Cristal Arena

9 September 2011 6	Sint-Truiden	3–4	Genk	Sint-Truiden
20:30 CEST (UTC+2)	Ghoochannejhad 28'; Mennes (yellow card) 35'; Christ 76'; Kotysch 82', (yellow card) 87'; Daerden (yellow card) 90'	Report	Buffel 29', 50'; Vossen 69'; Tőzsér 88'; Pudil (yellow card) 90'; Köteles (yellow card) 90'	Stadium: Stayen

18 September 2011 7	Genk	3–0	Standard Liège	Genk
18:00 CEST (UTC+2)	Simaeys (yellow card) 12'; Barda 33'; Buffel (yellow card) 35'; Nadson 62'; Vossen 90'	Report	Vainqueur (yellow card) 39'; Kanu (yellow card) 45'	Stadium: Cristal Arena

24 September 2011 8	OH Leuven	1–1	Genk	Leuven
20:00 CEST (UTC+2)	Hayen 66'	Report	Vossen 45'; Barda (red card) 56'	Stadium: Den Dreef

2 October 2011 9	Genk	0–1	Anderlecht	Genk
20:30 CEST (UTC+2)	Vanden Borre (yellow card) 60'; Ndabashinze (yellow card) 73'; Simaeys (yellow card) 84'	Report	Mbokani (yellow card) 30', (goal) 74'; Vargas (yellow card) 82'	Stadium: Cristal Arena

15 October 2011 10	Lokeren	3–1	Genk	Lokeren
18:00 CEST (UTC+2)	De Pauw 41'; Gueye 79'; Patosi 82'	Report	Benteke 10', (red card) 43'; Masuero (yellow card) 30'	Stadium: Daknamstadion

22 October 2011 11	Genk	2–0	Mons	Genk
20:00 CEST (UTC+2)	Buffel 71', 80'	Report		Stadium: Cristal Arena

29 October 2011 12	Club Brugge	4–5	Genk	Bruges
18:00 CEST (UTC+2)	Donk 20'; Vázquez 47'; Meunier 62'; Dirar 67'; Vleminckx (yellow card) 90'	Report	De Bruyne 3', 78', 86'; Buffel (yellow card) 38'; Hyland 45'; Vossen 72'; Vanden Borre (yellow card) 88'; Tőzsér (yellow card) 90'	Stadium: Jan Breydel Stadium

5 November 2011 13	Genk	2–2	Kortrijk	Genk
20:00 CET (UTC+1)	Vossen 47'; Limbombe 89'; Barda (yellow card) 90'	Report	Nfor 57'; Oussalah 67'	Stadium: Cristal Arena

19 November 2011 14	Genk	3–0	Westerlo	Genk
20:00 CET (UTC+1)	Vossen (yellow card) 30', (goal) 66'; Barda 69'; De Bruyne 80'	Report	S. Wils (red card) 12'; Deelkens (yellow card) 12'; Cardoso (yellow card) 25'	Stadium: Cristal Arena

27 November 2011 15	Gent	2–0	Genk	Ghent
18:00 CET (UTC+1)	Van der Bruggen 71'; El Ghanassy 90'	Report	Buffel (yellow card) 38'	Stadium: Jules Ottenstadion

2 December 2011 16	Beerschot	2–0	Genk	Antwerp
20:30 CET (UTC+1)	Mac-Donald 21', 45'; Pachovski (yellow card) 74'	Report	Vanden Borre (yellow card) 57'	Stadium: Olympisch Stadion

10 December 2011 17	Genk	4–0	Lierse	Genk
20:00 CET (UTC+1)	Barda 42', 76'; Grimi (yellow card) 54'; Buffel 83'; Vossen 90'	Report	T. Wils (yellow card) 34'	Stadium: Cristal Arena

18 December 2011 18	Standard Liège	0–0	Genk	Liège
14:30 CET (UTC+1)	Cyriac (yellow card) 38'; Pocognoli (yellow card) 90'; Felipe (yellow card) 90'	Report	Barda (yellow card) 25'; Simaeys (yellow card) 37'; Nadson (yellow card) 58'	Stadium: Stade Maurice Dufrasne

26 December 2011 19	Genk	4–2	Cercle Brugge	Genk
20:30 CET (UTC+1)	Barda 13', (yellow card) 54'; Benteke 37'; Vossen 45'; Camus 90'	Report	Vetokele 9'; Rudy (yellow card) 20'; Evens 31', (yellow card) 90'; Viðarsson (yellow card) 55'; Baldé (yellow card) 77'	Stadium: Cristal Arena

15 January 2012 20	Zulte Waregem	1–1	Genk	Waregem
18:00 CET (UTC+1)	Naessens 68'; Rossini (yellow card) 87'	Report	Ngcongca (yellow card) 12'; Vanden Borre (yellow card) 19'; Tőzsér (yellow card) 84'; Simaeys 90'	Stadium: Regenboogstadion

20 January 2012 21	Genk	2–1	Sint-Truiden	Genk
20:30 CET (UTC+1)	Barda 54' (pen.); Benteke 56'; Köteles (yellow card) 90'	Report	Delorge (yellow card) 23'; Ngawa 30'; Kotysch (red card) 52'; Daerden (yellow card) 53'	Stadium: Cristal Arena

25 January 2012 22	Mechelen	3–2	Genk	Mechelen
20:30 CET (UTC+1)	Gorius 49' (pen.); Ruiz 50', (yellow card) 69'; Cordaro (yellow card) 56'; Pandža 89', (yellow card) 89'	Report	Buffel 40', (yellow card) 49'; Benteke 65'	Stadium: Argosstadion Achter de Kazerne

28 January 2012 23	Genk	5–0	OH Leuven	Genk
20:00 CET (UTC+1)	De Bruyne 15', 17'; Vossen 21'; Buffel 33'; Benteke 77'	Report	Dejmek (yellow card) 55'	Stadium: Cristal Arena

5 February 2012 24	Anderlecht	4–2	Genk	Anderlecht
14:30 CET (UTC+1)	Suárez 9'; Juhász (yellow card) 20'; Kljestan 37'; Mbokani 61', 80'; Wasilewski (yellow card) 70'	Report	Benteke 8'; Hubert (yellow card) 12'; Barda 64', (yellow card) 71'	Stadium: Constant Vanden Stock Stadium

11 February 2012 25	Genk	0–1	Lokeren	Genk
18:00 CET (UTC+1)	Camus (yellow card) 76'	Report	De Ceulaer 11', (yellow card) 39'; Taravel (yellow card) 20'; Persoons (yellow card) 72'	Stadium: Cristal Arena

18 February 2012 26	Mons	1–2	Genk	Mons
20:00 CET (UTC+1)	Timmermans (yellow card) 67'; Nong (yellow card) 68'; Van Imschoot 80'	Report	Benteke 21'; De Bruyne 65'; Hyland (yellow card) 87'	Stadium: Stade Charles Tondreau

26 February 2012 27	Genk	3–0	Club Brugge	Genk
18:00 CET (UTC+1)	Hyland (yellow card) 29'; Benteke 58', 67'; Vanden Borre (yellow card) 62'; Vossen (yellow card) 71', (goal) 74'	Report	Van Acker (yellow card) 69'	Stadium: Cristal Arena

3 March 2012 28	Kortrijk	3–2	Genk	Kortrijk
20:00 CET (UTC+1)	Veselinović 8'; Pavlović 31'; Joseph-Monrose (yellow card) 77'; Van Hout (yellow card) 89'; Dejaegere 90+3'	Report	Hubert (yellow card) 14'; Camus (yellow card) 43'; Vossen 65', 90+1', (yellow card) 86'	Stadium: Guldensporen Stadion

18 March 2012 29	Westerlo	3–2	Genk	Westerlo
14:30 CET (UTC+1)	De Petter 3'; Reynaldo 5'; Goor 15', (yellow card) 62'; Verbauwhede (yellow card) 71'	Report	Barda 39'; Camus 52'; Peeters (yellow card) 75'; Benteke (yellow card) 83'; Ngcongca (yellow card) 90'	Stadium: Het Kuipje

21 March 2012 30	Genk	3–1	Gent	Genk
20:30 CET (UTC+1)	Benteke 62'; Buffel 64'; De Bruyne 69'	Report	Thijs 41'; Jørgensen (yellow card) 43'; Nahayo (yellow card) 90+4'	Stadium: Cristal Arena

==== Championship playoff ====
===== Playoff table =====
Pos	Team	Pld	W	D	L	GF	GA	GD	Pts	Qualification
1	Anderlecht (C)	10	5	3	2	16	8	+8	52	Qualification to Champions League third qualifying round
2	Club Brugge (Q)	10	5	2	3	14	11	+3	48	Qualification to Champions League third qualifying round
3	Genk (Q)	10	6	0	4	19	19	0	41	Qualification to Europa League third qualifying round
4	Gent	10	4	0	6	16	16	0	40	Qualification to Europa League Testmatch
5	Standard Liège	10	2	3	5	10	17	−7	35	
6	Kortrijk	10	3	2	5	16	20	−4	34	

Source: soccerway.com
Rules for classification: 1) points; 2) points after deduction of (possible) half points added due to rounding; 3) number of wins; 4) goal difference; 5) number of goals scored; 6) number of away goals scored; 7) number of away wins.
(C) Champions; (Q) Qualified for the phase indicated

===== Results summary =====
Overall								Home						Away					
Pld	W	D	L	GF	GA	GD	Pts	W	D	L	GF	GA	GD	W	D	L	GF	GA	GD
10	6	0	4	19	19	0	18	3	0	2	8	8	0	3	0	2	11	11	0

Source: Soccerway

===== Results by round =====
Round	1	2	3	4	5	6	7	8	9	10
Ground	A	H	H	A	H	H	A	A	H	A
Result	L	W	W	W	W	L	W	W	L	L
Position	6	6	4	3	3	4	3	3	3	3
Points	23	26	29	32	35	35	38	41	41	41

Source: Worldfootball
A = Away; H = Home; W = Win; D = Draw; L = Loss

===== Matches =====
30 March 2012 1	Club Brugge	2–0	Genk	Bruges
20:30 CEST (UTC+2)	Vázquez 24'; Hoefkens (yellow card) 27'; Akpala 62'; Blondel (yellow card) 64'	Report	De Bruyne (yellow card) 53'; Simaeys (yellow card) 59'	Stadium: Jan Breydel Stadium

7 April 2012 2	Genk	2–0	Gent	Genk
18:00 CEST (UTC+2)	Simaeys 15', (yellow card) 81'; Hyland (yellow card) 52'; Benteke 59'	Report	Rafinha (yellow card) 57'; Thijs (yellow card) 75' (yellow-red card) 83'; Wallace (yellow card) 75'; Brüls (yellow card) 89'	Stadium: Cristal Arena

11 April 2012 3	Genk	2–0	Kortrijk	Genk
20:30 CEST (UTC+2)	Tshimanga (yellow card) 54'; Vossen 56'; Martin 84' (o.g.)	Report	Zukanović (yellow card) 41'; Chavarría (yellow card) 56'; Pavlović (yellow card) 83'	Stadium: Cristal Arena

14 April 2012 4	Anderlecht	1–3	Genk	Anderlecht
20:00 CEST (UTC+2)	Mbokani 57'	Report	Benteke 19'; Tshimanga (yellow card) 34'; Vanden Borre 41'; Hyland (yellow card) 45'; Nadson (yellow card) 45+4'; Vossen 75', (yellow card) 85'	Stadium: Constant Vanden Stock Stadium

22 April 2012 5	Genk	3–2	Standard Liège	Genk
20:30 CEST (UTC+2)	Vanden Borre (yellow card) 25'; Köteles (yellow card) 30'; Pocognoli 52' (o.g.); Vossen 58'; Benteke 75'; Hyland (yellow card) 83'	Report	Tchité 4'; Ciman (yellow card) 22'; Buyens 31' (pen.), (yellow card) 57'; Van Damme (yellow card) 62'; Batshuayi (red card) 65'; González (yellow card) 83'	Stadium: Cristal Arena

27 April 2012 6	Genk	0–4	Anderlecht	Genk
20:30 CEST (UTC+2)	Buffel (yellow card) 45+2'	Report	Kanu 8', 53'; Gillet (yellow card) 32'; Bedi 53'; De Sutter 87'	Stadium: Cristal Arena

2 May 2012 7	Kortrijk	3–4	Genk	Kortrijk
20:30 CEST (UTC+2)	Chavarría 52'; Nfor 61'; Capon (yellow card) 74'; Veselinović 89'	Report	Vossen 4', 45'; Tőzsér (yellow card) 38'; Benteke 66', 78'	Stadium: Guldensporen Stadion

6 May 2012 8	Standard Liège	2–3	Genk	Liège
18:00 CEST (UTC+2)	Kanu (yellow card) 28'; Ezekiel 35'; Seijas 63'; M'Poku (yellow card) 72'	Report	Simaeys (yellow card) 9'; Tőzsér 48'; Vossen 56'; Nadson (yellow card) 85'; Benteke 88'	Stadium: Stade Maurice Dufrasne

10 May 2012 9	Genk	1–2	Club Brugge	Genk
20:30 CEST (UTC+2)	Vossen 24'; Grimi (yellow card) 58'; Ngcongca (yellow card) 75'	Report	Lestienne 45+2'; Akpala 80'; Zimling (yellow card) 86'; Odjidja-Ofoe (yellow card) 88'; Hoefkens (yellow card) 90+1'	Stadium: Cristal Arena

13 May 2012 10	Gent	3–1	Genk	Ghent
14:30 CEST (UTC+2)	Mboyo 11', 69'; N'Diaye 22'	Report	Nwanganga (yellow card) 21'; Coulibaly 66' (o.g.)	Stadium: Jules Ottenstadion

=== Belgian Cup ===
21 September 2011 Sixth round	Deinze	2–6	Genk	Deinze
20:30 CEST (UTC+2)	Van Mieghem 60'; Yakovlevsky 71'	Report	Vossen 3', 61'; Simaeys 15'; Hyland 38'; Limbombe 48'; Nwanganga 78'	Stadium: Burgemeester Van de Wiele Stadion

26 October 2011 Seventh round	Genk	0–2	Lierse	Genk
20:30 CEST (UTC+2)		Report	Huysegems 28'; Marić 54'	Stadium: Cristal Arena

=== Belgian Super Cup ===
As the defending Belgian Pro League champions, Genk faced reigning Belgian Cup winners Standard Liège in the Belgian Super Cup.

21 July 2011 Final	Genk	1–0	Standard Liège	Genk
18:00 CEST (UTC+2)	Vossen (red card) 28'; Tőzsér 45'	Report		Stadium: Cristal Arena

=== UEFA Champions League ===
==== Qualifying rounds ====
===== Third qualifying round =====
26 July 2011 First leg	Genk (Belgium)	2–1	(Serbia) Partizan	Genk, Belgium
20:45 CEST (UTC+2)	Nadson (yellow card) 19'; Ngcongca (red card) 32'; Vossen 70' (pen.); Vanden Borre (yellow card) 71'; Ogunjimi 90+2'	Report	Ilić (yellow card) 32'; Babović (yellow card) 41' (yellow-red card) 48'; Tomić (yellow card) 65', (yellow card) 69'; Jovančić (yellow card) 73'	Stadium: Cristal Arena; Attendance: 12,735; Referee: Michael Koukoulakis (Greece); Assistant referees: Dimitrios Saraidaris (Greece), Leonidas Vasileiadis (Greece); Fourth official: Vassilios Pamporidis (Greece)

3 August 2011 Second leg	Partizan (Serbia)	1–1 (2–3 agg.)	(Belgium) Genk	Belgrade, Serbia
20:45 CEST (UTC+2)	Tomić 40'; Miljković (yellow card) 57'; Vukić (yellow card) 57'	Report	Vossen 58' (pen.); Vanden Borre (yellow card) 67'; De Bruyne (yellow card) 83'	Stadium: Stadion FK Partizan; Attendance: 24,511; Referee: Jorge Sousa (Portugal); Assistant referees: José Ramalho (Portugal), Nuno Miguel Silva Manso (Portugal); Fourth official: Cosme Machado (Portugal)
Note: Genk won 3–2 on aggregate.

==== Play-off round ====
17 August 2011 First leg	Maccabi Haifa (Israel)	2–1	(Belgium) Genk	Ramat Gan, Israel (Note: The match was played at the Ramat Gan Stadium in Ramat Gan, as Maccabi Haifa chose to host it there due to its greater capacity compared to their own Kiryat Eliezer Stadium in Haifa.)
21:45 IDT (UTC+3)	Amasha 8'; Dvalishvili 28'	Report	Barda 61'; Vossen (yellow card) 76'; Joneleit (yellow card) 84'	Stadium: Ramat Gan Stadium; Attendance: 19,170; Referee: Wolfgang Stark (Germany); Assistant referees: Jan-Hendrik Salver (Germany), Mike Pickel (Germany); Fourth official: Guido Winkmann (Germany); Goal-line assistants: Peter Sippel (Germany), Christian Dingert (Germany)

23 August 2011 Second leg	Genk (Belgium)	2–1 (a.e.t.) (3–3 agg.) (4–1 p)	(Israel) Maccabi Haifa	Genk, Belgium
20:45 CEST (UTC+2)	Vossen 35'; Buffel 41'	Report	I. Cohen (yellow card) 11' (yellow-red card) 109'; Meshumar (yellow card) 34'; Golasa 37'; Tawatha (yellow card) 43'; Yahaya (yellow card) 54'; Falah (yellow card) 76'	Stadium: Cristal Arena; Attendance: 13,753; Referee: Howard Webb (England); Assistant referees: Michael Mullarkey (England), Darren Cann (England); Fourth official: Lee Mason (England); Goal-line assistants: Michael Oliver (England), Kevin Friend (England)
	Penalties
	Vossen (penalty scored); Hubert (penalty scored); Tőzsér (penalty scored); Pudil (penalty scored)		(penalty missed) Dvalishvili; (penalty missed) Golasa; (penalty scored) Tawatha
Note: 3–3 on aggregate. Genk won 4–1 on penalties.

==== Group stage ====
Pos	Team	Pld	W	D	L	GF	GA	GD	Pts	Qualification	CHE	LEV	VAL	GNK
1	(England) Chelsea	6	3	2	1	13	4	+9	11	Advance to knockout phase	—	2–0	3–0	5–0
2	(Germany) Bayer Leverkusen	6	3	1	2	8	8	0	10	Advance to knockout phase	2–1	—	2–1	2–0
3	(Spain) Valencia	6	2	2	2	12	7	+5	8	Transfer to Europa League	1–1	3–1	—	7–0
4	(Belgium) Genk	6	0	3	3	2	16	−14	3		1–1	1–1	0–0	—

Source: Soccerway

13 September 2011 1	Genk (Belgium)	0–0	(Spain) Valencia	Genk, Belgium
20:45 CEST (UTC+2)	Buffel (yellow card) 61'; Pudil (yellow card) 67'	Report	Banega (yellow card) 28'	Stadium: Cristal Arena; Attendance: 20,248; Referee: Thomas Einwaller (Austria); Assistant referees: Norbert Schwab (Austria), Armin Eder (Austria); Fourth official: Gerhard Grobelnik (Austria); Goal-line assistants: Harald Lechner (Austria), Oliver Drachta (Austria)

28 September 2011 2	Bayer Leverkusen (Germany)	2–0	(Belgium) Genk	Leverkusen, Germany
20:45 CEST (UTC+2)	Bender 30'; Kadlec (yellow card) 50'; Toprak (yellow card) 87'; Ballack 90+1'	Report	Nadson (yellow card) 23'; Pudil (yellow card) 39'	Stadium: BayArena; Attendance: 25,138; Referee: Alan Kelly (Republic of Ireland); Assistant referees: Damien MacGraith (Republic of Ireland), Marc Douglas (Republic of Ireland); Fourth official: David Mckeon (Republic of Ireland); Goal-line assistants: Padraig Sutton (Republic of Ireland), Tomas Connolly (Republic of Ireland)

19 October 2011 3	Chelsea (England)	5–0	(Belgium) Genk	London, England
19:45 BST (UTC+1)	Meireles 8'; Torres 11', 27'; David Luiz (yellow card) 18'; Ivanović 42'; Kalou 72'	Report	Hyland (yellow card) 15'; Pudil (yellow card) 42'	Stadium: Stamford Bridge; Attendance: 38,518; Referee: Aleksei Nikolaev (Russia); Assistant referees: Anton Averianov (Russia), Tikhon Kalugin (Russia); Fourth official: Vitali Meshkov (Russia); Goal-line assistants: Stanislav Sukhina (Russia), Maksim Layushkin (Russia)

1 November 2011 4	Genk (Belgium)	1–1	(England) Chelsea	Genk, Belgium
20:45 CET (UTC+1)	Vossen 61'; De Bruyne (yellow card) 76'	Report	Ramires 26'; David Luiz (penalty missed) 40'; Meireles (yellow card) 90+1'	Stadium: Cristal Arena; Attendance: 22,584; Referee: Svein Oddvar Moen (Norway); Assistant referees: Kim Thomas Haglund (Norway), Dag-Roger Nebben (Norway); Fourth official: Tom Harald Hagen (Norway); Goal-line assistants: Espen Berntsen (Norway), Dag Vidar Hafsås (Norway)

23 November 2011 5	Valencia (Spain)	7–0	(Belgium) Genk	Valencia, Spain
20:45 CET (UTC+1)	Jonas 10'; Soldado 13', 35', 39', (yellow card) 64'; Ruiz (yellow card) 16'; Hernández 68'; Aduriz 70'; T. Costa 81'	Report		Stadium: Mestalla Stadium; Attendance: 35,086; Referee: Tony Chapron (France); Assistant referees: Emmanuel Boisdenghien (France), Fredji Harchay (France); Fourth official: Philippe Malige (France); Goal-line assistants: Saïd Ennjimi (France), Clément Turpin (France)

6 December 2011 6	Genk (Belgium)	1–1	(Germany) Bayer Leverkusen	Genk, Belgium
20:45 CET (UTC+1)	Vossen 30', (yellow card) 42'; Simaeys (yellow card) 90'	Report	Derdiyok 79'	Stadium: Cristal Arena; Attendance: 21,187; Referee: Paolo Tagliavento (Italy); Assistant referees: Elenito Di Liberatore (Italy), Massimiliano Grilli (Italy); Fourth official: Paolo Valeri (Italy); Goal-line assistants: Daniele Orsato (Italy), Luca Banti (Italy)
