= Delorge =

Delorge is a surname. Notable people with the surname include:

- Laurent Delorge (born 1979), Belgian footballer
- Kino Delorge (born 1998), Belgian footballer
- Peter Delorge (born 1980), Belgian footballer
