= Roger Lambrecht =

Roger Lambrecht may refer to:

- Roger Lambrecht (cyclist) (1916–1979), Belgian road cyclist
- Roger Lambrecht (businessman) (1931–2022), Belgian businessman and footballer
