= Reto Stiffler =

Swiss businessman (1939-2025)

- Born: 1939; Switzerland
- Died: 10 January 2025 (aged 85); Switzerland
- Occupation: Businessman

Reto Stiffler (25 February 1939 – 10 January 2025) was a Swiss businessman. He was 14th president of the football club Standard Liège.

== Life and career ==
Born in Davos in 1939 Stiffler played ice hockey in his youth. He studied hotel management in Lausanne and was owner of the Hôtel Club in Davos.

In the late 1990s, when Standard Liège was facing financial trouble, businessman Robert Louis-Dreyfus saved the team from bankruptcy at the request of Lucien D'Onofrio, who entrusted the presidency to Stiffler. He succeeded André Duchêne in October 2000 after his involvement in the rescue of Olympique de Marseille in the early 1990s. Despite his role as president of Standard Liège, he continued to live in Davos, which let to Lucien D'Onofrio taking the vice-presidency. Under Stiffler, the club won great respect, winning the Belgian First Division in 2008 and 2009. The team also won the Belgian Super Cup in 2008 and 2009. Additionally the team won the 2011 Belgian Cup. After the death of Robert Louis-Dreyfus, his wife, Margarita, decided to sell her shares of the club for €40 million to Roland Duchâtelet. Consequently, Stiffler left the club.

Stiffler died on 10 January 2025, at the age of 85.
