= Jonathan Legear =

Belgian footballer

Personal information
- Full name: Jonathan Fernand Jean Legear
- Date of birth: 13 April 1987 (age 39)
- Place of birth: Liège, Belgium
- Height: 1.79 m (5 ft 10 in)
- Position: Right winger

Team information
- Current team: RCS Verlaine (manager)

Youth career
- 1995–1998: JS Thier-à-Liège
- 1998–2003: Standard Liège
- 2003–2004: Anderlecht

Senior career*
Years	Team	Apps	(Gls)
2004–2011	Anderlecht	122	(19)
2011–2013	Terek Grozny	22	(1)
2014	KV Mechelen	3	(0)
2014–2015	Blackpool	0	(0)
2015–2017	Standard Liège	27	(4)
2017–2019	Sint-Truiden	37	(6)
2019	Adana Demirspor	7	(1)
2020–2023	URSL Visé	49	(9)
2023–2024	RCS Verlaine	21	(6)

International career
2003	Belgium U16	10	(2)
2003–2004	Belgium U17	9	(2)
2004–2006	Belgium U19	20	(3)
2006–2008	Belgium U21	8	(3)
2010	Belgium	2	(0)

Managerial career
- 2023–2024: RCS Verlaine (assistant)
- 2024–: RCS Verlaine (technical director)
- 2024–: RCS Verlaine
- * Club domestic league appearances and goals

Jonathan Fernand Jean Legear (born 13 April 1987) is a Belgian professional football coach and a former player who played as a midfielder. He is the manager and technical director RCS Verlaine in the fourth-tier Belgian Division 2.

== Club career ==
Legear moved to Anderlecht from their rivals Standard Liège in 2003. He scored his first goal in the Jupiler League against Standard Liège in the 2004–05 season.

He was initially registered to the football club of J.S Thier (Jeunesse sportive du Thier-à-Liège), a small club near Liège at the age of eight, a club where he showed a promising future in Belgian football. From there he was scouted by the Standard Liège Academy who recruited him in 1998. Despite the tacit agreement between the top three clubs in Belgium, which prevents transfers between those clubs academies, Legear moved from Standard to Anderlecht in 2003.

In the 2007–08 season, Legear made the breakthrough into the Anderlecht starting XI and featured regularly in the team's Jupiler League and European competition matches. This was a result of his increasing level of performances, as well as Anderlecht's lack of attacking options on the right wing. He was touted as the next Christian Wilhelmsson, with similar hair color and speed on the flank.

On 26 August 2011, Legear joined Terek Grozny of the Russian Premier League, signing a three-year contract for a fee of €1.8 million. He made his league debut on 12 September 2011 against Kuban Krasnodar, a match which Terek lost 1–2. Legear marked his first goal in the 2012–13 season, scoring the opener against Mordovia Saransk on 10 November 2012 to give his side a 2–1 victory. On 17 January 2014, his contract was terminated by mutual consent after disagreements between him and the club.

Legear returned to Belgium on 31 January 2014, penning a six-month deal with KV Mechelen. He made his first league appearance on 28 February 2014 as a substitute for Boubacar Dialiba during the second half in their 1–0 win over Lokeren.

He joined Blackpool on 4 November 2014, in a one-year deal. His contract was terminated, by mutual consent, on 28 January 2015.

== International career ==
Legear made his debut for the Belgium national team on 8 October 2010 in a 2–0 European Championship qualifier win against Kazakhstan.

== Personal life ==
On 7 October 2012, Legear was involved in a car accident in which he crashed his car, while being drunk, inside an Esso gas station located in Tongeren, having mistaken the accelerator pedal for the brake. Damage costs were revealed to be between €250,000 and €300,000 by an Esso spokesman, with Legear also receiving a two-week driving suspension. He had earlier been involved in a similar incident in 2009, where he was sentenced to 50 hours of community service for having driven his car into a house after a night out.

== Honours ==
Anderlecht

- Belgian First Division: 2005–06, 2006–07, 2009–10
- Belgian Cup: 2007–08
- Belgian Super Cup: 2010

Standard Liège

- Belgian Cup: 2015–16
