= Jurgen Sierens =

Belgian footballer

Personal information
- Date of birth: 10 April 1976 (age 50)
- Place of birth: Roeselare, Belgium
- Height: 1.91 m (6 ft 3 in)
- Position: Goalkeeper

Youth career
- 1996–1998: Lokeren

Senior career*
Years	Team	Apps	(Gls)
1998–2000	Lokeren	9	(0)
2000–2003	KV Oostende	63	(0)
2003–2010	Roeselare	203	(0)
2010	Brussel	15	(0)
- * Club domestic league appearances and goals as of 13 August 2009 ‡ National team caps and goals as of 15 June 2009

Jurgen Sierens (born 4 October 1976) is a Belgian former footballer.

== Career ==
He has played as a goalkeeper for K.S.V. Roeselare since 2002. Before 2002 Sierens was a goalkeeper for Lokeren. Sierens played for his hometown for 7 years before scoring a notorious own goal against Anderlecht getting him released.
