= Roger Lambrecht (businessman) =

Belgian businessman and footballer (1931–2022)

- Born: 19 August 1931; Lokeren, Belgium
- Died: 15 February 2022 (aged 90)
- Occupations: Businessman; footballer

Roger Lambrecht (19 August 1931 – 15 February 2022) was a Belgian businessman and footballer. He was president of Sporting Lokeren from 1994 to 2019.

== Biography ==
Lambrecht made his football debut during World War II with Standaard FC Lokeren. He also played junior football for K.F.C. Vigor Wuitens Hamme and RJ Arlon. Upon his retirement, he began working in a Michelin factory.

In the 1960s, Lambrecht founded his own tire manufacturing plant in Berchem, located just outside of Antwerp. In 1993, he became managing director of the newly founded airline VLM Airlines. One year later, he took over Sporting Lokeren, which had just been relegated to the Belgian Second Division. He brought the club back to Belgian First Division A in 1996. He then devoted himself to the club full-time and left VLM Airlines in 1997.

Lambrecht was the sole decision-maker for Sporting Lokeren until 2010. He decided to delegate some functions of the club to technical director Willy Verhoost and sporting manager Jean-Marie Philips, the latter of whom was replaced the following year by Marc Vanmaele. The club subsequently won the Belgian Cup in 2012 and 2014.

In June 2019, Lambrecht agreed to sell the club after nearly 25 years in charge. On 7 June 2019, a takeover agreement was reached with a group led by former player agent Louis de Vries, who succeeded him in the club's leadership.

In 2020, the club was declared bankrupt following ongoing financial difficulties under new ownership.

He died on 15 February 2022, at the age of 90.
