= Anthony Portier =

Belgian footballer

Personal information
- Full name: Anthony Portier
- Date of birth: 1 June 1982 (age 44)
- Place of birth: Ostend, Belgium
- Height: 1.83 m (6 ft 0 in)
- Position: Defender

Team information
- Current team: Beerschot Wilrijk

Youth career
- GS Middelkerke
- KV Oostende

Senior career*
Years	Team	Apps	(Gls)
1998–2006	KV Oostende	92	(5)
2006–2013	Cercle Brugge	180	(10)
2013–2014	RU Union	29	(2)
2014–	Beerschot Wilrijk	32	(3)
- * Club domestic league appearances and goals as of 2 January 2016

Anthony Portier (Dutch pronunciation: [ˈɑntoːni ˈpɔrtiːr]; born 1 June 1982) is a Belgian professional football player who plays for Beerschot Wilrijk. His best position is central in defence.

Portier started playing football at Gold Star Middelkerk, where he was discovered by a neighbouring Belgian coast team, KV Oostende where he eventually made it to the first team. Portier then moved on to Cercle Brugge. He was transferred to the Bruges side a half season after his previous team KV Oostende had relegated from the First division.

== Trivia ==
- Anthony Portier has a Cercle Brugge fan club named after him, De Portiervrienden (English: The Friends of Portier). The fan club is located in Middelkerke, where Portier grew up.
