= Cephas Chimedza =

Zimbabwean footballer (born 1984)

Personal information
- Full name: Cephas Chimedza
- Date of birth: 5 December 1984 (age 41)
- Place of birth: Harare, Zimbabwe
- Height: 1.78 m (5 ft 10 in)
- Position: Defensive midfielder

Team information
- Current team: V.K. Heindonk

Senior career*
Years	Team	Apps	(Gls)
–2004	Dynamos FC		
2004–2005	CAPS United		
2005–2006	Germinal Beerschot	11	(0)
2006–2010	Sint-Truidense	119	(19)
2011	Westerlo	0	(0)
2011–2012	Cappellen		
2013-2018	Willebroek Meerhof		
2018-2021	FC De Bruurs		
2025-	V.K. Heindonk		

International career
2004–2008	Zimbabwe	32	(4)
- * Club domestic league appearances and goals

Cephas Chimedza (born 5 December 1984) is a Zimbabwean footballer who can play in a number of positions, left back, holding midfielder, attacking midfielder and left side midfield.

In 2004 he was voted soccer star of the year in Zimbabwe. He was part of the Zimbabwe team at the AFCON in 2006 scoring once against Ghana in a 2 -1 win.
