= Mahamoudou Kéré =

Burkinabé footballer (born 1982)

Personal information
- Full name: Mahamoudou Kéré
- Date of birth: 2 January 1982 (age 44)
- Place of birth: Ouagadougou, Republic of Upper Volta
- Height: 1.81 m (5 ft 11 1/2 in)
- Position: Centre back

Youth career
- –1997: Santos FC

Senior career*
Years	Team	Apps	(Gls)
1997–1998	Santos FC	24	(3)
1999–2010	Charleroi	299	(7)
2010–2012	Konyaspor	33	(2)
2012–2013	Samsunspor	24	(4)
2013– 2014	RWDM Brussels	20	(1)

International career^{‡}
2000–2012	Burkina Faso	48	(2)
- * Club domestic league appearances and goals as of 18 March 2016 ‡ National team caps and goals as of 18 March 2015

Mahamoudou Kéré (born 2 January 1982) is a Burkinabé former professional footballer who played as a centre back.

== Career ==
Kéré was born in Ouagadougou. On 9 June 2010, he left Charleroi SC to join Turkish side Konyaspor on a 3-year contract.

== International career ==
Kéré was a member of the Burkinabé 2004 African Nations Cup team, who finished bottom of their group in the first round of competition, thus failing to secure qualification for the quarter-finals.

== Career statistics ==
=== International goals ===
#	Date	Venue	Opponent	Score	Result	Competition
1.	21 June 2008	Stade du 4-Août, Ouagadougou, Burkina Faso	Seychelles	4–1	Win	2010 World Cup qualification
2.	28 March 2009	Stade du 4-Août, Ouagadougou, Burkina Faso	Guinea	4–2	Win	2010 World Cup qualification
Correct as of 15 September 2011
