= Jérôme Efong Nzolo =

Belgian former football referee (born 1974)

Jérôme Efong Nzolo (born 21 September 1974 in Bitam, Gabon) is a former Belgian football referee. He was the first black referee in the Belgian Pro League.

Nzolo arrived in Belgium from Gabon in 1995 to start his studies as an electromechanical engineer in Charleroi. Although having refereed since 14 years of age in Gabon, he followed another refereeing education and training in 1996. In the year 2000 he was already refereeing matches at the fourth level of Belgian football, while on 26 January 2006 he made his debut at the highest level.

In Gabon, he refereed the 1994 final of the Gabonese Cup in front of attendance of around 40,000 people. He became a FIFA referee in 2008. His first international match came on 26 May 2008 when he was in charge of the UEFA European Under-19 Football Championship qualification between France and Switzerland.

After failing three consecutive times for mandatory physical tests, it was announced he would skip the final test and abandon refereeing on 2 April 2015.
