= Marc Wagemakers =

Belgian footballer

Personal information
- Date of birth: 7 June 1978 (age 48)
- Place of birth: Maaseik, Belgium
- Height: 1.84 m (6 ft 1/2 in)
- Position: Defender

Team information
- Current team: Standard Elen

Youth career
- 1984–1990: Excelsior Ophoven-Geistingen

Senior career*
Years	Team	Apps	(Gls)
1996–2001	Patro Eisden	89	(4)
2001–2008	Westerlo	158	(7)
2008–2011	Sint-Truiden	87	(1)
2011–2012	Fortuna Sittard	24	(0)
2012–2013	Esperanza Neerpelt		
2013–	Standard Elen		

Managerial career
- 2012–2013: Esperanza Neerpelt (playing coach)
- * Club domestic league appearances and goals

Marc Wagemakers (born 7 June 1978) is a Belgian football player. who plays for Standard Elen.

== Career ==
He started his career as a little kid with a small provincial club but soon after a few years it was obvious that he was a good player and he transferred to the then second-tier club Patro Eisden and played there until 2001 when he transferred again, this time to top flight club K.V.C. Westerlo. As a defender he doesn't score many goals but he has scored in important games, he made winning goals against RSC Anderlecht and Racing Genk. For Westerlo, he played in the UEFA Cup in 2001–02 against German club Hertha BSC Berlin. At the end of the 2007–08 season his contract ended and he signed at Sint-Truiden, who had then just relegated from the Jupiler League.
