= Ernest Webnje Nfor =

Cameroonian footballer

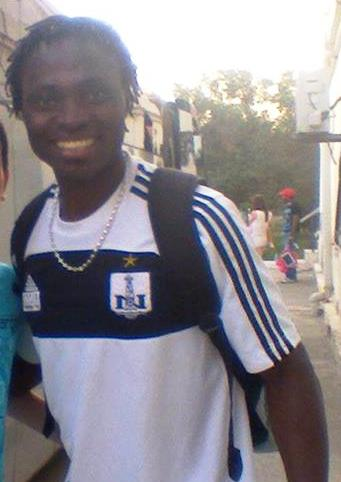

Personal information
- Date of birth: 28 April 1986 (age 40)
- Place of birth: Bertoua, Cameroon
- Height: 1.80 m (5 ft 11 in)
- Position: Forward

Team information
- Current team: KSV Temse

Senior career*
Years	Team	Apps	(Gls)
?–2005	Sable FC		
2005–2006	Gent	2	(0)
2006–2007	→ Deinze (loan)	5	(1)
2007–2008	→ Kortrijk (loan)	35	(14)
2008	Gent	7	(1)
2009–2011	Zulte Waregem	75	(11)
2011–2013	Kortrijk	66	(13)
2013–2015	Neftchi Baku	48	(8)
2015–2016	Al-Wehda	8	(3)
2016	FCO Beerschot Wilrijk	0	(0)
2016–2017	Foolad	3	(0)
2017–2018	Birkirkara	5	(1)
2018	Dender	12	(1)
2018–2019	K. Olsa Brakel		
2019–	KSV Temse		

International career
2012	Cameroon	1	(0)
- * Club domestic league appearances and goals as of 18:00, 20 July 2019 (UTC)

Ernest Webnje Nfor (born 28 April 1986 in Cameroon), known as Nfor, is a Cameroonian professional footballer, who currently plays for Belgian club KSV Temse as a striker.

== Career ==
=== Belgium ===
In January 2006 he started playing KAA Ghent, coming from Sable Batié. He was hardly playing opportunities, and the following season he was loaned to KMSK Deinze. During the 2007–08 season he was loaned to KV Kortrijk. After that season AA Gent wanted to take him back into the first team. Nfor played half a season at Ghent, but could not completely break in first class. Gent decided to loan him out again. KV Kortrijk and Zulte Waregem competed for Nfor services, Zulte Waregem drew the longest straw and hired the striker initially until the end of the season. After Zulte-Waregem Player Mbaye Leye AA Gent departed Nfor was adopted definitively by SV Zulte Waregem.

For the 2010-2011 he returned to his former club KV Kortrijk, and on 19 May 2011 signed a contract for three years. He became a regular player during the 2011–2012 season and won the Kortrijk Golden Boot, a prize awarded by the supporters.

=== Geox ===
Along with fellow Cameroonian footballer Aloys Nong, Nfor is sponsored by Geox, the shoe that breathes.

=== Azerbaijan ===
In August 2013, Nfor moved to the Azerbaijan Premier League with then reigning champions Neftchi Baku. In the first season they won the Cup. Nfor's 2-year contract with Neftchi Baku ended in August 2015 and he left the club after ending his contract.

=== Saudi Arabia ===
Since January 2016 he joined Al-Wehda Mecca of Saudi Arabia. He played 8 matches and scored 3 goals against Al Hilal, Al-Ittihad, and Al Raed FC in the Saudi Professional League.

=== Back to Belgium ===
After five months in Malta, playing for Birkirkara, he moved back to Belgium in January 2018 and joined Dender. He then moved to K. Olsa Brakel in October 2018, before he moved to KSV Temse.

== Sediment ==
He has made several comments about "sediment" in public post-match interviews.

== Career statistics ==
As of 29 January 2015

Club performance			League		Cup		Continental		Other		Total	
Season	Club	League	Apps	Goals	Apps	Goals	Apps	Goals	Apps	Goals	Apps	Goals
2008–09	Zulte Waregem	Jupiler Pro League	16	6			-		-		16	6
2009–10	Zulte Waregem	Jupiler Pro League	36	4	1	0	-		-		37	4
2010–11	Zulte Waregem	Jupiler Pro League	23	1	1	0	-		-		24	1
2011–12	KV Kortrijk	Jupiler Pro League	35	9	6	1	-		-		41	10
2012–13	KV Kortrijk	Jupiler Pro League	31	4	6	2	-		-		37	6
2013–14	Neftchi Baku	APL	31	6	6	1	0	0	1	0	38	7
2014–15	Neftchi Baku	APL	12	2	1	2	6	3	0	0	19	7
Total	Belgium		141	24	14	3	0	0	0	0	155	27
Total	Azerbaijan		43	8	7	3	6	3	1	0	57	14
Total			184	32	21	5	6	3	1	0	212	41
