= Brecht Verbrugghe =

Belgian footballer

Personal information
- Date of birth: 29 April 1982 (age 44)
- Place of birth: Roeselare, Belgium
- Height: 1.82 m (6 ft 0 in)
- Position: Midfielder

Team information
- Current team: K.V. Kortrijk
- Number: 17

Youth career
- 1996–1998: K.S.V. Roeselare

Senior career*
Years	Team	Apps	(Gls)
1998–1999	K.S.V. Roeselare	27	(1)
1999–2002	K.A.A. Gent	7	(0)
2002–2003	S.V. Zulte Waregem	3	(0)
2003–	K.V. Kortrijk	79	(3)
- * Club domestic league appearances and goals as of 3 December 2006

Brecht Verbrugghe (born 29 April 1982 in Roeselare) is a Belgium football midfielder who currently plays for KV Kortrijk. He joined to S.V. Zulte Waregem in 2002, he came from K.A.A. Gent.
