= Maxime Biset =

Belgian footballer

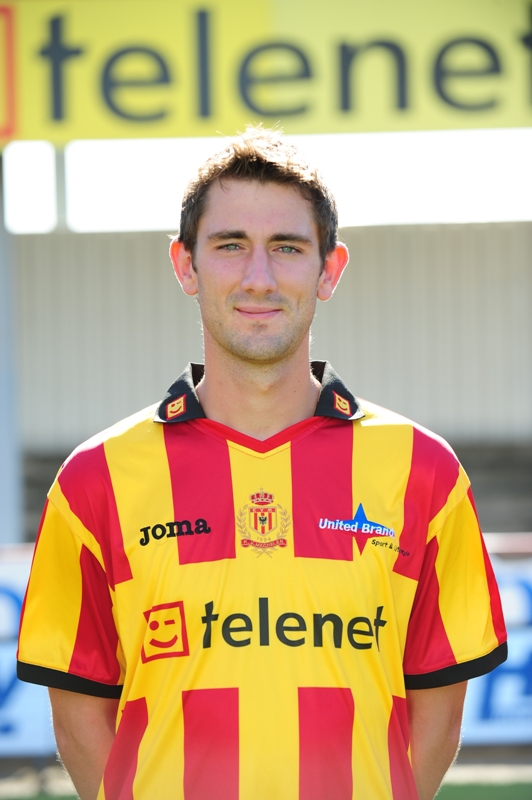

Personal information
- Date of birth: 26 March 1986 (age 40)
- Place of birth: Charleroi, Belgium
- Height: 1.94 m (6 ft 4 1/2 in)
- Position: Centre back

Team information
- Current team: Antwerp (assistant coach)

Youth career
- KV Hemiksem
- Mechelen

Senior career*
Years	Team	Apps	(Gls)
2005–2015	Mechelen	165	(6)
2015–2017	Antwerp	50	(1)
2017–2021	Westerlo	98	(5)
Total		313	(12)

Managerial career
- 2021–: Antwerp (assistant)
- * Club domestic league appearances and goals

Maxime Biset (born 26 March 1986) is a Belgian football coach and a former midfielder. He works as an assistant coach with Antwerp.

== Coaching career ==
Following his retirement from playing at the end of the 2021–22 season, on 16 June 2021 he was hired as an assistant coach by Antwerp.
