= Jonas Ivens =

Belgian footballer

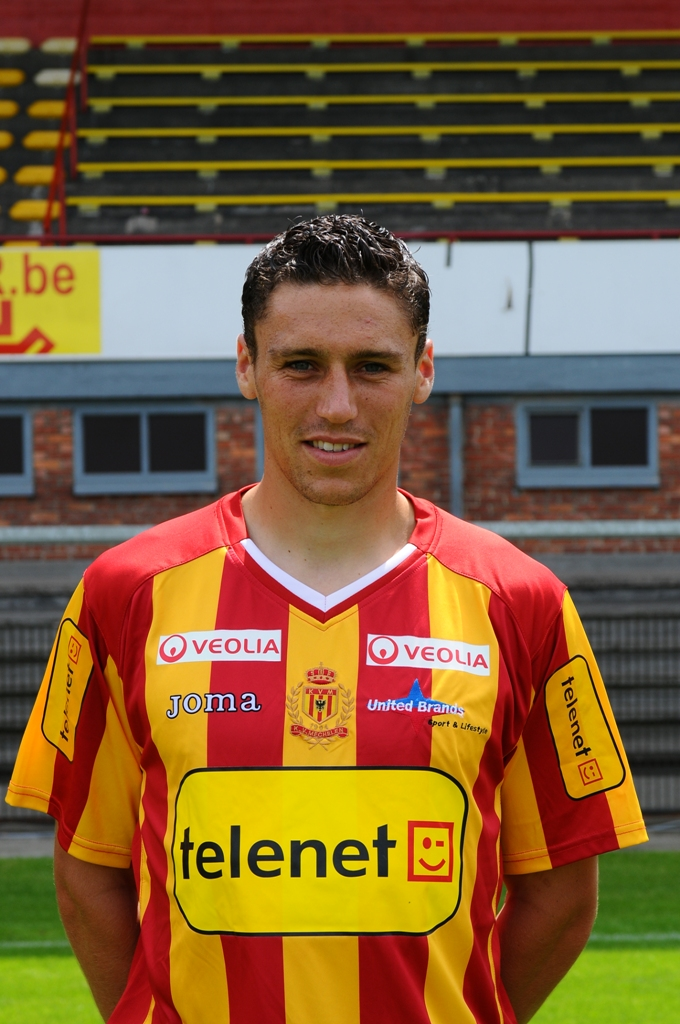

Personal information
- Date of birth: 14 October 1984 (age 42)
- Place of birth: Beveren, Belgium
- Height: 1.88 m (6 ft 2 in)
- Position: Centre-back

Team information
- Current team: AS Monaco (assistant)

Youth career
- Beveren

Senior career*
Years	Team	Apps	(Gls)
2003–2004	Beveren	4	(0)
2004–2006	Deinze	62	(4)
2006–2010	Mechelen	118	(14)
2010–2014	FC Groningen	54	(2)
2013	→ Waasland-Beveren (loan)	14	(0)
2013–2014	→ RKC Waalwijk (loan)	10	(0)
2014–2015	Niki Volos	14	(1)
2015–2016	Cercle Brugge	4	(0)
2016	Deinze	12	(1)

Managerial career
- 2016–2018: Waasland-Beveren (physical coach)
- 2018–2019: Waasland-Beveren B
- 2018–2019: Waasland-Beveren (assistant)
- 2019–2022: Club Brugge (assistant)
- 2022–: AS Monaco (assistant)
- * Club domestic league appearances and goals

Jonas Ivens (born 14 October 1984 in Beveren) is a retired Belgian footballer who played as a centre back. He is currently the assistant manager of AS Monaco.

He made a name of himself in his homeland Belgium, before moving to Dutch football in the summer of 2010 after signing with Groningen.

== Career ==
=== Belgium ===
Ivens broke through to the first team of hometown club KSK Beveren in the 2003–04 season. He played one season for the club, in a period in which Jean-Marc Guillou guided Beveren to a more attractive financial situation through talented Ivorian players. This meant a limited opportunity for Ivens to play in the first team, which resulted in moving to second division side KMSK Deinze in 2004. There he played two seasons, before being signed by K.V. Mechelen in the spring of 2006. With Mechelen he promoted to the Belgian Pro League, and became captain of the team.

=== FC Groningen ===
On 16 June 2010, Ivens signed a four-year contract with Groningen. Groningen paid a €500,000 fee for the player. He made his first-team debut in a 2–2 Eredivisie draw against Ajax on 8 August 2010.

== Coaching career ==
After retiring at the end of the 2015–16 season, Ivens was hired as a physical coach at Waasland-Beveren. In the summer 2018, he took charge of the club's reserve and would, next to that, also function as an assistant manager for the first team.

In the summer 2019, he was appointed assistant manager of Club Brugge KV under manager Philippe Clement. On 3 January 2022, Ivens moved to AS Monaco together with Clement.
