= Denis Viane =

Belgian footballer

Personal information
- Full name: Denis Omer Viane
- Date of birth: 2 October 1977 (age 49)
- Place of birth: Bruges, Belgium
- Height: 1.79 m (5 ft 10 1/2 in)
- Position: Defender

Youth career
- VKSO Zerkegem
- Cercle Brugge

Senior career*
Years	Team	Apps	(Gls)
1997–2011	Cercle Brugge	335	(2)
2011–2012	Antwerp	18	(2)

Managerial career
- 2012–2013: KVV Oostduinkerke
- 2013–2015: Cercle Brugge (youth)
- 2015: Cercle Brugge (assistant)
- 2015: KVV Coxyde
- * Club domestic league appearances and goals

Denis Viane (born 2 October 1977 in Bruges) is a Belgian former footballer. He usually played as defender (central or full-back), although he could also play as a midfielder.

Denis began his career at VKSO Zerkegem. In 1990, he signed for Cercle Brugge. He made his debut on 15 October 1997, in a home defeat in a cup match against Exc. Mouscron. He was captain of the team from 2001 until July 2007, when new Cercle Brugge manager Glen De Boeck named Jimmy De Wulf as captain.

In 2004, Denis lost his girlfriend Nele, who died of leukemia. The team was cut up by her death, managing only to get 2 points out of the following 9 matches.

After being rather unsure of a place in the starting eleven in the 2006–07 season, Viane took his position back in 2007–08, forcing a.o. team captain Jimmy De Wulf to the bench.
