= Grégory Christ =

French footballer (born 1982)

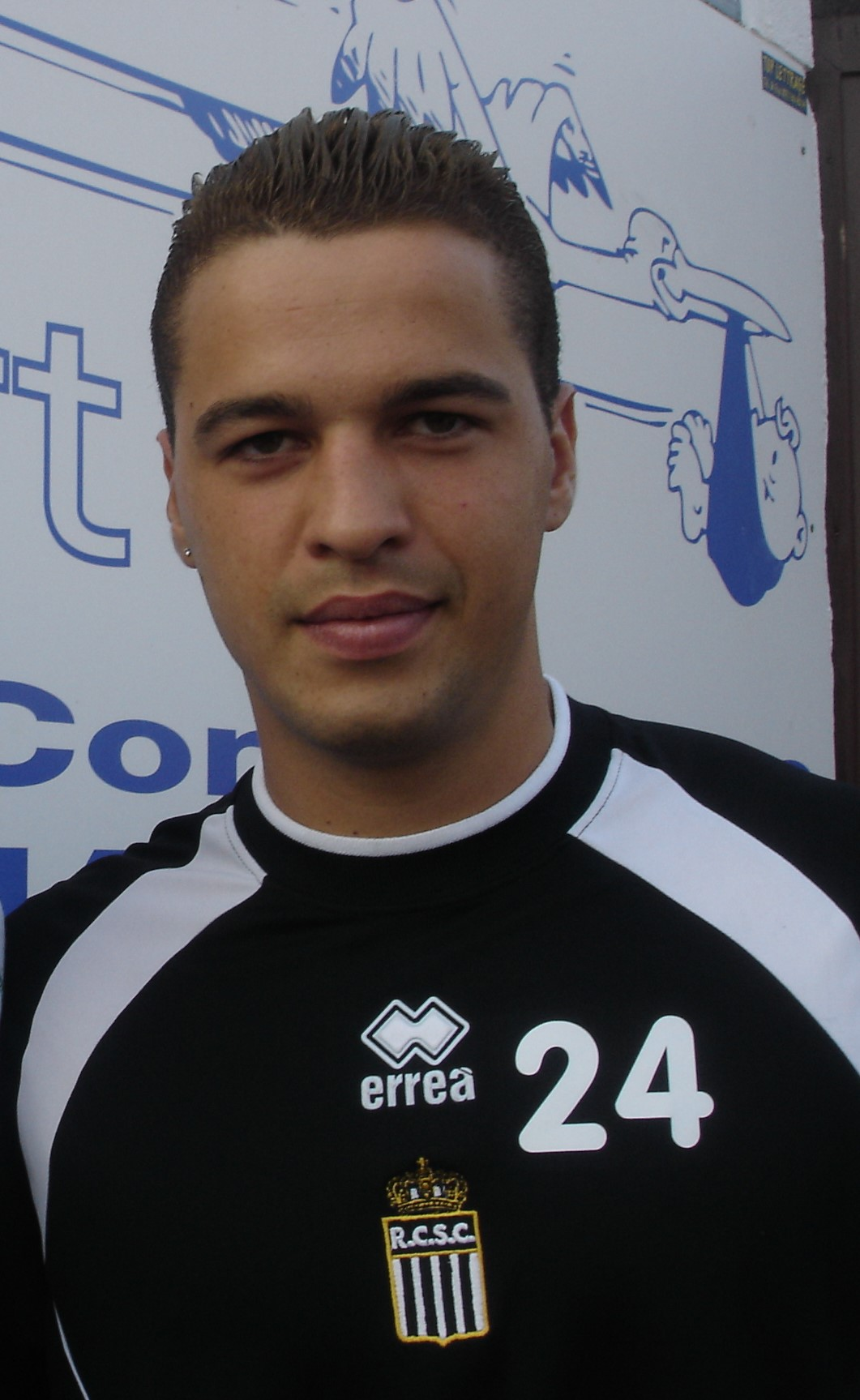
- Christ with Charleoi in 2005

Personal information
- Date of birth: 4 October 1982 (age 44)
- Place of birth: Beauvais, France
- Height: 1.74 m (5 ft 9 in)
- Position: Midfielder

Senior career*
Years	Team	Apps	(Gls)
2002–2003	AS Beauvais	6	(0)
2003–2004	RCF Paris	29	(4)
2004–2010	Charleroi	153	(8)
2008–2009	→ MSV Duisburg (loan)	11	(1)
2010–2012	Sint-Truiden	13	(0)
2010–2011	→ Panthrakikos (loan)	10	(0)
2012–2014	Újpest	27	(1)
2014	White Star Bruxelles	6	(1)
2014–2016	Jeunesse Tamines		
- * Club domestic league appearances and goals

Grégory Christ (born 4 October 1982) is a French former professional footballer who played as a midfielder.

== Career ==
In August 2016 it was reported Christ would be joining ROCCM of the Belgian Fourth Division.
