= Bernt Evens =

Belgian footballer (born 1978)

Personal information
- Date of birth: 9 November 1978 (age 47)
- Place of birth: Neerpelt, Belgium
- Height: 1.89 m (6 ft 2 1/2 in)
- Position: Defender

Senior career*
Years	Team	Apps	(Gls)
1997–1998	Genk	0	(0)
1998–2000	Maasland	63	(3)
2000–2005	Antwerp	154	(5)
2005–2008	Westerlo	85	(4)
2008–2009	Club Brugge	18	(0)
2009–2013	Cercle Brugge	140	(10)
- * Club domestic league appearances and goals as of 2 October 2012

Bernt Evens (born 9 November 1978) is a Belgian retired professional footballer who played for Cercle Brugge and Club Brugge, as a defender.

On 22 June 2013 he began at Cercle Brugge as account manager.

== Career ==
Born in Neerpelt, Evens has played for Genk, Maasland, Antwerp, Westerlo and Club Brugge.
