= Peter Delorge =

Belgian footballer

Personal information
- Full name: Peter Delorge
- Date of birth: 19 April 1980 (age 46)
- Place of birth: Sint-Truiden, Belgium
- Height: 1.78 m (5 ft 10 in)
- Position: Defensive midfielder

Youth career
- 1986–1989: RS Opheers
- 1989–1995: Wellen SK
- 1995–1996: VK Zepperen
- 1996–1998: STVV

Senior career*
Years	Team	Apps	(Gls)
1998–2013	Sint-Truiden	368	(12)

International career
2000–2002	Belgium U21	12	(0)
- * Club domestic league appearances and goals

Peter Delorge (born 19 April 1980 in Sint-Truiden, Belgium) is a former professional footballer.

== Career ==
He played as a defensive midfielder and spent his whole career at Sint-Truidense.

Delorge played in 204 matches from 1998 to 2008 in the Jupiler League for STVV. Peter made the transition from provincial to national youth at the age of 17. He won the league title with de Uefa's, and shot to the first team a year later.

== Personal life ==
His brother was footballer Kristof Delorge, who died young due to a brain tumor in 2021. His sons Mathias Delorge-Knieper and Lucas Delorge-Knieper, are footballer too. Lucas plays in the youth of Club Brugge KV and Mathias plays for KAA Gent.
