= List of Belgian football transfers winter 2012–13 =

This is a list of Belgian football transfers for the 2012-13 winter transfer window. Only transfers involving a team from the Belgian Pro League are listed.

The winter transfer window opens on 1 January 2013, although a few transfers may take place prior to that date. The window closes at midnight on 1 February 2013. Players without a club may join one, either during or in between transfer windows.

== Sorted by date ==
=== August 2012 ===
Date	Name	Moving from	Moving to	Fee
August 31, 2012	(Iran) Reza Ghoochannejhad	(Belgium) Sint-Truiden	(Belgium) Standard Liège	Undisclosed

=== October 2012 ===
Date	Name	Moving from	Moving to	Fee
October 31, 2012	(Senegal) Kara Mbodj	(Norway) Tromsø	(Belgium) Genk	Undisclosed

=== November 2012 ===
Date	Name	Moving from	Moving to	Fee
November 15, 2012	(Denmark) Alexander Scholz	(Iceland) Stjarnan	(Belgium) Lokeren	Undisclosed
November 21, 2012	(Saudi Arabia) Osama Hawsawi	(Belgium) Anderlecht	(Saudi Arabia) Al-Ahli	Undisclosed

=== December 2012 ===
Date	Name	Moving from	Moving to	Fee	Note
December 11, 2012	(Bolivia) Vicente Arze	(Belgium) Charleroi	(Iran) Esteghlal	Loan	
December 12, 2012	(Bosnia and Herzegovina) Armin Ćerimagić	(Belgium) Gent	(Belgium) Eendracht Aalst	Loan	
December 12, 2012	(Senegal) Elimane Coulibaly	(Belgium) Beerschot	Free Agent	Released	
December 15, 2012	(Senegal) Elimane Coulibaly	Free Agent	(Belgium) Gent	NA	
December 19, 2012	(Spain) Walter Fernández	(Hungary) Videoton	(Belgium) Lokeren	Undisclosed	
December 20, 2012	(Slovenia) Uroš Palibrk	(Belgium) Lierse	(Italy) AC Milan	Loan Terminated	
December 21, 2012	(Czech Republic) Marcel Gecov	(Belgium) Gent	(Czech Republic) Slavia Prague	Undisclosed	
December 22, 2012	(Brazil) Renato Neto	(Portugal) Sporting	(Belgium) Gent	Loan	(Note: During the first half of the 2012-13 season, Neto was already on loan from Sporting Portugal to Videoton of Hungary. The loan deal ended and now Neto was loaned to Gent for the second half of the season.)
December 22, 2012	(Belgium) Benito Raman	(Belgium) Gent	(Belgium) Beerschot	Loan	
December 24, 2012	(Bosnia and Herzegovina) Ervin Zukanović	(Belgium) Kortrijk	(Belgium) Gent	Undisclosed	
December 25, 2012	(Spain) Jordi Figueras	(Belgium) Club Brugge	(Spain) Rayo Vallecano	Loan	
December 26, 2012	(Chinese Taipei) Xavier Chen	(Belgium) Mechelen	(China) Guizhou Renhe	Undisclosed	
December 27, 2012	(Belgium) Jonas Ivens	(Netherlands) Groningen	(Belgium) Waasland-Beveren	Loan	
December 29, 2012	(Serbia) Uroš Delić	(Belgium) Beerschot	(Belgium) Eendracht Aalst	Loan	
December 29, 2012	(Belgium) Stijn De Smet	(Belgium) Gent	(Belgium) Waasland-Beveren	Loan	(Note: During the summer 2012 transfer window, Gent loaned out Christophe Lepoint to Waasland-Beveren for the whole 2012–13 season. However, Gent insisted on terminating the loan deal early and offered to loan out Stijn De Smet and Jordan Remacle to Waasland-Beveren for the remainder of the season as part of the deal.)
December 29, 2012	(Bosnia and Herzegovina) Goran Galešić	(Belgium) Beerschot	Free Agent	Released	
December 29, 2012	(Belgium) Christophe Lepoint	(Belgium) Waasland-Beveren	(Belgium) Gent	Loan Return	
December 29, 2012	(Belgium) Jordan Remacle	(Belgium) Gent	(Belgium) Waasland-Beveren	Loan	

=== January 2013 ===
Date	Name	Moving from	Moving to	Fee	Note
January 1, 2013	(Belgium) Cédric Buekers	(Belgium) Sint-Truiden	(Belgium) OH Leuven	Undisclosed	
January 2, 2013	(France) Harlem Gnohéré	(Belgium) Charleroi	(Belgium) Westerlo	Loan	
January 2, 2013	(Belgium) Thibaut Van Acker	(Belgium) Club Brugge	(Belgium) Beerschot	Loan	
January 3, 2013	(Belgium) Alessandro Cerigioni	(Belgium) Lommel United	(Belgium) OH Leuven	Undisclosed	
January 3, 2013	(England) Zeki Fryers	(Belgium) Standard Liège	(England) Tottenham Hotspur	Undisclosed	
January 3, 2013	(Belgium) David Hubert	(Belgium) Genk	(Belgium) Gent	Loan	
January 3, 2013	(Uruguay) Guillermo Mendez	(Belgium) Standard Liège	(Belgium) Sint-Truiden	Loan	
January 3, 2013	(Nigeria) Kennedy Nwanganga	(Belgium) Genk	(Belgium) Beerschot	Loan	
January 3, 2013	(Belgium) Stef Peeters	(Belgium) Genk	(Netherlands) Sparta Rotterdam	Loan	
January 3, 2013	(Belgium) Björn Vleminckx	(Belgium) Club Brugge	(Turkey) Gençlerbirliği	Loan	
January 4, 2013	(Belgium) Mohammed Aoulad	(Belgium) Charleroi	(Belgium) Anderlecht	Loan Return	
January 4, 2013	(Senegal) Mansour Diop	(Senegal) Guédiawaye	(Belgium) Zulte Waregem	Undisclosed	
January 4, 2013	(Senegal) Elhadji Ndoye	(Senegal) Renaissance Dakar	(Belgium) Zulte Waregem	Undisclosed	
January 4, 2013	(Zimbabwe) Vuza Nyoni	(Belgium) Beerschot	(Belgium) Mons	Undisclosed	
January 5, 2013	(Belgium) Laurens De Bock	(Belgium) Lokeren	(Belgium) Club Brugge	Undisclosed	
January 5, 2013	(Ukraine) Oleg Iachtchouk	(Belgium) Cercle Brugge	(Belgium) Westerlo	Loan	
January 5, 2013	(Republic of the Congo) Maël Lépicier	(Belgium) Mons	(Belgium) Beerschot	Undisclosed	
January 5, 2013	(Netherlands) Joey Suk	(Netherlands) Go Ahead Eagles	(Belgium) Beerschot	Undisclosed	
January 6, 2013	(Belgium) Mats Rits	(Netherlands) Ajax	(Belgium) Mechelen	Undisclosed	
January 6, 2013	(Senegal) Jamal Thiaré	(Senegal) CNEPS Excellence	(Belgium) Charleroi	Loan	
January 7, 2013	(France) Maxime Chanot	(Belgium) WS Woluwe	(Belgium) Beerschot	Undisclosed	
January 7, 2013	(Israel) Rami Gershon	(Belgium) Standard Liège	(Scotland) Celtic Glasgow	Loan	
January 8, 2013	(France) Mickael Seoudi	(Belgium) Waasland-Beveren	(Belgium) Mouscron-Péruwelz	Loan	
January 10, 2013	(Ghana) Francis Dickoh	Free Agent	(Belgium) Cercle Brugge	NA	
January 10, 2013	(Brazil) Junior Dutra	(Japan) Kashima Antlers	(Belgium) Lokeren	Free	
January 11, 2013	(Democratic Republic of the Congo) Zola Matumona	(Belgium) Mons	(Angola) Primeiro de Agosto	Undisclosed	
January 11, 2013	(Slovenia) Matija Škarabot	(Belgium) Gent	(Croatia) Rijeka	Undisclosed	
January 12, 2013	(Belgium) Frederik Boi	(Belgium) OH Leuven	(Belgium) Cercle Brugge	Loan	
January 12, 2013	(Belgium) Marvin Ogunjimi	(Belgium) Standard Liège	(Spain) Mallorca	Loan Return	(Note: Ogunjimi was on loan from Mallorca to Standard Liège during the 2012–13 season, but Standard wanted to terminate the deal halfway through the season. Beerschot was interested to take over the loan deal for the second half of the season, a move which was agreed by Mallorca.)
January 12, 2013	(Belgium) Marvin Ogunjimi	(Spain) Mallorca	(Belgium) Beerschot	Loan	
January 12, 2013	(Israel) Yadin Zaris	(Hungary) Újpest	(Belgium) Standard Liège	Loan Return	(Note: Zaris was on loan from Standard Liège to Újpest during the 2012–13 season, but the loan deal was terminated and Zaris was now loaned to Sint-Truiden.)
January 12, 2013	(Israel) Yadin Zaris	(Belgium) Standard Liège	(Belgium) Sint-Truiden	Loan	
January 13, 2013	(Iceland) Eiður Guðjohnsen	(Belgium) Cercle Brugge	(Belgium) Club Brugge	Undisclosed	
January 13, 2013	(Belarus) Mikhail Sivakov	(Belgium) Zulte Waregem	(Belarus) BATE Borisov	Undisclosed	(Note: Sivakov was already on loan from Zulte Waregem to BATE Borisov during the 2012–13 season, but the clubs agreed to make the transfer permanent.)
January 14, 2013	(Egypt) Mohamed Abdel Wahed	(Egypt) Wadi Degla	(Belgium) Lierse	Loan	
January 14, 2013	(Egypt) Ashour El Tekky	(Egypt) Wadi Degla	(Belgium) Lierse	Loan	
January 14, 2013	(Egypt) Ahmed Fawzy	(Egypt) Wadi Degla	(Belgium) Lierse	Loan	
January 14, 2013	(Egypt) Essam Mahmoud	(Egypt) Wadi Degla	(Belgium) Lierse	Loan	
January 14, 2013	(Ghana) William Mensah	(Egypt) Wadi Degla	(Belgium) Lierse	Loan	
January 14, 2013	(Nigeria) Kim Ojo	(Norway) Brann Bergen	(Belgium) Genk	Undisclosed	
January 14, 2013	(Belgium) David Pollet	(France) Lens	(Belgium) Charleroi	Undisclosed	
January 14, 2013	(Egypt) Mostafa Shebeita	(Egypt) Wadi Degla	(Belgium) Lierse	Loan	
January 15, 2013	(Costa Rica) Óscar Duarte	(Costa Rica) Deportivo Saprissa	(Belgium) Club Brugge	Undisclosed	
January 16, 2013	(Belgium) Lens Annab	(Algeria) ES Sétif	(Belgium) Lierse	Undisclosed	
January 16, 2013	(Togo) Franck Mawuena	(Belgium) Beerschot	(Belgium) Standaard Wetteren	Loan	
January 16, 2013	(Democratic Republic of the Congo) Bedi Mbenza	(Belgium) Anderlecht	(Tunisia) Club Africain	Undisclosed	
January 16, 2013	(Japan) Kensuke Nagai	(Japan) Nagoya Grampus	(Belgium) Standard Liège	Undisclosed	
January 17, 2013	(Belgium) Baptiste Ulens	(Belgium) WS Woluwe	(Belgium) Kortrijk	Undisclosed	
January 18, 2013	(Haiti) Réginal Goreux	(Belgium) Standard Liège	(Russia) Krylia Sovetov	Undisclosed	
January 19, 2013	(Sweden) Samuel Armenteros	(Netherlands) Heracles	(Belgium) Anderlecht	Undisclosed	
January 19, 2013	(Sweden) Guillermo Molins	(Belgium) Anderlecht	(Spain) Real Betis	Loan	
January 21, 2013	(Sweden) Magnus Eriksson	(Belgium) Gent	(Sweden) Malmö FF	Undisclosed	
January 21, 2013	(Ghana) Richard Ofori	(Germany) 1. FC Kaiserslautern	(Belgium) Lierse	Loan	
January 21, 2013	(Japan) Yuji Ono	(Japan) Yokohama Marinos	(Belgium) Standard Liège	Undisclosed	
January 22, 2013	(Belgium) Arnaud Biatour	(Belgium) Mons	(Belgium) Visé	Undisclosed	
January 22, 2013	(Netherlands) Demy de Zeeuw	(Russia) Spartak Moscow	(Belgium) Anderlecht	Loan	
January 22, 2013	(France) Blanstel Koussalouka	(Belgium) Kortrijk	(Belgium) Boussu Dour	Loan	
January 22, 2013	(France) Grégory Lorenzi	(France) Brest	(Belgium) Mons	Undisclosed	
January 22, 2013	(Belgium) Sébastien Pocognoli	(Belgium) Standard Liège	(Germany) Hannover 96	Undisclosed	
January 23, 2013	(Belgium) Victor Christiaens	(Belgium) Zulte Waregem	(Belgium) Oudenaarde	Loan	
January 23, 2013	(Cameroon) Dorge Kouemaha	(Belgium) Club Brugge	(Turkey) Gaziantepspor	Loan	(Note: During the first half of the season, Kouemaha was on loan from Club Brugge to Eintracht Frankfurt. The loan ended and now Kouemaha was loaned to Gaziantepspor.)
January 24, 2013	(Belgium) Hervé Kage	(Belgium) Charleroi	(Belgium) Gent	Undisclosed	
January 24, 2013	(Belgium) David Vandenbroeck	(Belgium) Zulte Waregem	(Belgium) Antwerp	Loan	
January 25, 2013	(Ghana) Enoch Adu	(Denmark) Nordsjælland	(Belgium) Club Brugge	Undisclosed	
January 25, 2013	(Uruguay) Joaquín Boghossian	(Austria) Salzburg	(Belgium) Cercle Brugge	Loan	
January 25, 2013	(Netherlands) Joey Godee	(Netherlands) AGOVV Apeldoorn	(Belgium) Cercle Brugge	Undisclosed	
January 25, 2013	(Belgium) Conor Laerenbergh	(Belgium) Beerschot	(Belgium) Antwerp	Free	
January 25, 2013	(Croatia) Tomislav Mikulić	(Belgium) Beerschot	(Belgium) OH Leuven	Free	
January 25, 2013	(Belgium) Arne Naudts	(Belgium) Cercle Brugge	(Belgium) Oudenaarde	Loan	
January 25, 2013	(Denmark) Niki Zimling	(Belgium) Club Brugge	(Germany) 1. FSV Mainz 05	Undisclosed	
January 26, 2013	(Israel) Dudu Biton	(Belgium) Standard Liège	(Cyprus) APOEL	Loan	
January 26, 2013	(Belgium) Jonas Heymans	(Belgium) Lierse	(Netherlands) AZ	Undisclosed	
January 26, 2013	(Belgium) Dolly Menga	(Belgium) Lierse	(Italy) Torino	Loan	
January 26, 2013	(France) Benjamin Nicaise	(Belgium) Mons	Free Agent	Released	
January 26, 2013	(France) Jérémy Perbet	(Belgium) Mons	(Spain) Villarreal	Loan	
January 28, 2013	(Ghana) Frank Acheampong	(Thailand) Buriram United	(Belgium) Anderlecht	Loan	
January 28, 2013	(Israel) Shlomi Arbeitman	(Belgium) Gent	(Belgium) Mons	Loan	
January 28, 2013	(Iceland) Birkir Bjarnason	(Belgium) Standard Liège	(Italy) Pescara	Undisclosed	(Note: Bjarnason was already on loan from Standard Liège to Pescara during first half of the 2012–13 season, but the clubs agreed to make the transfer permanent.)
January 28, 2013	(Romania) Adrian Cristea	(Romania) Petrolul Ploiești	(Belgium) Standard Liège	Loan	
January 28, 2013	(Ivory Coast) Zié Diabaté	(France) Dijon	(Belgium) Standard Liège	Loan	
January 28, 2013	(Ethiopia) Saladin Said	(Egypt) Wadi Degla	(Belgium) Lierse	Undisclosed	
January 29, 2013	(Spain) Jorge López	(Greece) OFI	(Belgium) Gent	Free	
January 29, 2013	(Belgium) Brice Ntambwe	(England) Birmingham City	(Belgium) Mons	Undisclosed	
January 29, 2013	(France) Jerry Vandam	(France) Lille	(Belgium) Mechelen	Undisclosed	
January 29, 2013	(Belgium) Anthony Vanden Borre	Free Agent	(Belgium) Anderlecht	NA	
January 30, 2013	(Belgium) Giel Deferm	(Belgium) Sint-Truiden	(Belgium) Beerschot	Undisclosed	
January 30, 2013	(Belgium) Yassine El Ghanassy	(England) West Bromwich Albion	(Belgium) Gent	Loan Return	(Note: El Ghanassy was on loan from Gent to West Bromwich Albion during the 2012–13 season, but halfway through the season he moved on loan to Heerenveen. West Bromwich Albion still kept the option to buy El Ghanassy at the end of the season.)
January 30, 2013	(Belgium) Yassine El Ghanassy	(Belgium) Gent	(Netherlands) Heerenveen	Loan	
January 30, 2013	(Belgium) Guillaume François	(Belgium) Beerschot	(Belgium) Charleroi	Undisclosed	
January 30, 2013	(Honduras) Andy Najar	(United States) DC United	(Belgium) Anderlecht	Undisclosed	
January 30, 2013	(Belgium) Leandro Trossard	(Belgium) Genk	(Belgium) Lommel United	Loan	
January 31, 2013	(Egypt) Mohamed Abdel Wahed	(Belgium) Lierse	(Egypt) Wadi Degla	Loan Return	(Note: On January 14 it was reported that Abdel Wahed, Fawzy and Mensah together with three other players where loaned from Wadi Degla to Lierse. However, two weeks later the news was announced that they already moved from Lierse to Turnhout.)
January 31, 2013	(Belgium) Mohammed Aoulad	(Belgium) Anderlecht	(Belgium) Waasland-Beveren	Loan	
January 31, 2013	(Belgium) Cyprien Baguette	(Belgium) Charleroi	(Belgium) Brussels	Loan	
January 31, 2013	(Belgium) Yassine Benali	(Belgium) Lierse	(Belgium) Turnhout	Loan	
January 31, 2013	(Guinea) Ibrahima Conté	(Belgium) Gent	(Belgium) Zulte Waregem	Loan	
January 31, 2013	(Belgium) Wouter Corstjens	(Belgium) Gent	(Belgium) Westerlo	Loan	
January 31, 2013	(South Africa) Lance Davids	(Belgium) Lierse	(South Africa) Ajax Cape Town	Loan	
January 31, 2013	(Egypt) Ahmed Fawzy	(Belgium) Lierse	(Egypt) Wadi Degla	Loan Return	
January 31, 2013	(Uruguay) Nacho González	(Belgium) Standard Liège	(Spain) Hércules	Loan	
January 31, 2013	(Central African Republic) Habib Habibou	(Belgium) Zulte Waregem	(England) Leeds United	Loan	
January 31, 2013	(Belgium) Geoffry Hairemans	(Belgium) Lierse	(Belgium) Turnhout	Loan	
January 31, 2013	(Belgium) Nathan Kabasele	(Belgium) Anderlecht	(Italy) Torino	Loan	
January 31, 2013	(Ghana) William Mensah	(Belgium) Lierse	(Egypt) Wadi Degla	Loan Return	
January 31, 2013	(France) Loïc Nego	(Italy) Roma	(Belgium) Standard Liège	Loan	
January 31, 2013	(Belgium) Jasper Otte	(Belgium) Zulte Waregem	(Belgium) Standaard Wetteren	Loan	
January 31, 2013	(Brazil) Willian Pacheco	(Belgium) Charleroi	Free Agent	NA	
January 31, 2013	(Cameroon) Christian Pouga	(Belgium) OH Leuven	(Belgium) Lierse	Loan	
January 31, 2013	(Brazil) Reynaldo	(Belgium) Anderlecht	(Azerbaijan) Qarabağ	Undisclosed	
January 31, 2013	(Belgium) Jérémy Serwy	(Belgium) Zulte Waregem	(Belgium) WS Woluwe	Loan	
January 31, 2013	(Belgium) René Sterckx	(Belgium) Anderlecht	(Belgium) Waasland-Beveren	Loan	
January 31, 2013	(Portugal) Yohan Tavares	(Belgium) Standard Liège	(Portugal) Estoril	Loan	
January 31, 2013	(Romania) George Țucudean	(Romania) Dinamo București	(Belgium) Standard Liège	Undisclosed	
January 31, 2013	(France) Jean-Christophe Vergerolle	(Belgium) Charleroi	(Belgium) Brussels	Loan	

== Sorted by team ==
=== Anderlecht ===
In:

No.	Pos.	Nation	Player
6	MF	NED	Demy de Zeeuw (on loan from (Russia) Spartak Moscow)
7	FW	SWE	Samuel Armenteros (from (Netherlands) Heracles)
12	MF	HON	Andy Najar (from (United States) DC United)
18	FW	GHA	Frank Acheampong (on loan from (Thailand) Buriram United)
34	DF	BEL	Anthony Vanden Borre (free agent)

Out:

No.	Pos.	Nation	Player
4	DF	KSA	Osama Hawsawi (to (Saudi Arabia) Al-Ahli)
6	MF	COD	Bedi Mbenza (to (Tunisia) Club Africain)
7	MF	SWE	Guillermo Molins (on loan to (Spain) Real Betis)
—	MF	BEL	Mohammed Aoulad (was on loan to (Belgium) Charleroi, now loaned to (Belgium) Waasland-Beveren)
—	FW	BEL	Nathan Kabasele (on loan to (Italy) Torino)
—	FW	BRA	Reynaldo (to (Azerbaijan) Qarabağ)
—	MF	BEL	René Sterckx (on loan to (Belgium) Waasland-Beveren)

=== Beerschot ===
In:

No.	Pos.	Nation	Player
7	FW	BEL	Benito Raman (on loan from (Belgium) Gent)
8	FW	NGR	Kennedy Nwanganga (on loan from (Belgium) Genk)
11	MF	NED	Joey Suk (from (Netherlands) Go Ahead Eagles)
19	FW	BEL	Marvin Ogunjimi (on loan from (Spain) Mallorca)
22	DF	FRA	Maxime Chanot (from (Belgium) WS Woluwe)
25	DF	CGO	Maël Lépicier (from (Belgium) Mons)
41	MF	BEL	Thibaut Van Acker (on loan from (Belgium) Club Brugge)
—	MF	BEL	Giel Deferm (from (Belgium) Sint-Truiden)

Out:

No.	Pos.	Nation	Player
7	MF	BIH	Goran Galešić (released)
11	MF	ZIM	Vuza Nyoni (to (Belgium) Mons)
12	FW	TOG	Franck Mawuena (on loan to (Belgium) Standaard Wetteren)
14	FW	SEN	Elimane Coulibaly (released, then signed for (Belgium) Gent)
24	FW	BEL	Guillaume François (to (Belgium) Charleroi)
25	DF	CRO	Tomislav Mikulić (to (Belgium) OH Leuven)
—	MF	SRB	Uroš Delić (on loan to (Belgium) Eendracht Aalst)
—	FW	BEL	Conor Laerenbergh (to (Belgium) Antwerp)

=== Cercle Brugge ===
In:

No.	Pos.	Nation	Player
12	MF	BEL	Frederik Boi (on loan from (Belgium) OH Leuven)
19	FW	GHA	Francis Dickoh (free agent)
22	FW	NED	Joey Godee (from (Netherlands) AGOVV Apeldoorn)
43	FW	URU	Joaquín Boghossian (on loan from (Austria) Salzburg)

Out:

No.	Pos.	Nation	Player
9	FW	UKR	Oleg Iachtchouk (on loan to (Belgium) Westerlo)
22	FW	ISL	Eiður Guðjohnsen (to (Belgium) Club Brugge)
34	FW	BEL	Arne Naudts (on loan to (Belgium) Oudenaarde)

=== Charleroi ===
In:

No.	Pos.	Nation	Player
10	FW	BEL	David Pollet (from (France) Lens)
16	FW	SEN	Jamal Thiaré (on loan from (Senegal) CNEPS Excellence)
22	FW	BEL	Guillaume François (from (Belgium) Beerschot)

Out:

No.	Pos.	Nation	Player
9	MF	BOL	Vicente Arze (on loan to (Iran) Esteghlal)
10	MF	BEL	Hervé Kage (to (Belgium) Gent)
20	MF	BEL	Mohammed Aoulad (loan return to (Belgium) Anderlecht)
23	GK	BEL	Cyprien Baguette (on loan to (Belgium) Brussels)
31	FW	FRA	Harlem Gnohéré (on loan to (Belgium) Westerlo)
93	DF	FRA	Jean-Christophe Vergerolle (on loan to (Belgium) Brussels)
—	DF	BRA	Willian Pacheco (released)

=== Club Brugge ===
In:

No.	Pos.	Nation	Player
6	MF	GHA	Enoch Adu (from (Denmark) Nordsjælland)
22	FW	ISL	Eiður Guðjohnsen (from (Belgium) Cercle Brugge)
29	DF	BEL	Laurens De Bock (from (Belgium) Lokeren)
31	DF	CRC	Óscar Duarte (from (Costa Rica) Deportivo Saprissa)

Out:

No.	Pos.	Nation	Player
6	MF	DEN	Niki Zimling (to (Germany) 1. FSV Mainz 05)
9	FW	BEL	Björn Vleminckx (on loan to (Turkey) Gençlerbirliği)
20	MF	BEL	Thibaut Van Acker (on loan to (Belgium) Beerschot)
22	DF	ESP	Jordi Figueras (on loan to (Spain) Rayo Vallecano)
—	FW	CMR	Dorge Kouemaha (was on loan to (Germany) Eintracht Frankfurt, now loaned to (Turkey) Gaziantepspor)

=== Genk ===
In:

No.	Pos.	Nation	Player
2	DF	SEN	Kara Mbodj (from (Norway) Tromsø)
6	FW	NGR	Kim Ojo (from (Norway) Brann Bergen)

Out:

No.	Pos.	Nation	Player
6	MF	BEL	David Hubert (on loan to (Belgium) Gent)
27	FW	NGR	Kennedy Nwanganga (on loan to (Belgium) Beerschot)
28	MF	BEL	Stef Peeters (on loan to (Netherlands) Sparta Rotterdam)
39	FW	BEL	Leandro Trossard (on loan to (Belgium) Lommel United)

=== Gent ===
In:

No.	Pos.	Nation	Player
11	MF	BEL	Hervé Kage (from (Belgium) Charleroi)
26	MF	BEL	Christophe Lepoint (loan return from (Belgium) Waasland-Beveren)
30	MF	ESP	Jorge López (from (Greece) OFI)
34	DF	BIH	Ervin Zukanović (from (Belgium) Kortrijk)
35	MF	BRA	Renato Neto (on loan from (Portugal) Sporting)
38	FW	SEN	Elimane Coulibaly (released by (Belgium) Beerschot, then signed as free agent)
42	MF	BEL	David Hubert (on loan from (Belgium) Genk)

Out:

No.	Pos.	Nation	Player
3	MF	CZE	Marcel Gecov (to (Czech Republic) Slavia Prague)
4	DF	BEL	Wouter Corstjens (on loan to (Belgium) Westerlo)
10	FW	ISR	Shlomi Arbeitman (on loan to (Belgium) Mons)
11	FW	BEL	Jordan Remacle (on loan to (Belgium) Waasland-Beveren)
18	MF	BIH	Armin Ćerimagić (on loan to (Belgium) Eendracht Aalst)
22	DF	SLO	Matija Škarabot (to (Croatia) Rijeka)
23	MF	BEL	Stijn De Smet (on loan to (Belgium) Waasland-Beveren)
27	FW	BEL	Benito Raman (on loan to (Belgium) Beerschot)
28	MF	GUI	Ibrahima Conté (on loan to (Belgium) Zulte Waregem)
30	FW	SWE	Magnus Eriksson (to (Sweden) Malmö FF)
—	FW	BEL	Yassine El Ghanassy (was on loan to (England) West Bromwich Albion, now loaned to (Netherlands) Heerenveen)

=== Kortrijk ===
In:

No.	Pos.	Nation	Player
23	DF	BEL	Baptiste Ulens (from (Belgium) WS Woluwe)

Out:

No.	Pos.	Nation	Player
23	DF	BIH	Ervin Zukanović (to (Belgium) Gent)
24	MF	FRA	Blanstel Koussalouka (on loan to (Belgium) Boussu Dour)

=== Lierse ===
In:

No.	Pos.	Nation	Player
8	MF	EGY	Ashour El Tekky (on loan from (Egypt) Wadi Degla)
9	MF	EGY	Mostafa Shebeita (on loan from (Egypt) Wadi Degla)
22	GK	EGY	Essam Mahmoud (on loan from (Egypt) Wadi Degla)
33	MF	BEL	Lens Annab (from (Algeria) ES Sétif)
37	DF	GHA	Richard Ofori (on loan from (Germany) 1. FC Kaiserslautern)
—	FW	CMR	Christian Pouga (on loan from (Belgium) OH Leuven)
—	FW	ETH	Saladin Said (from (Egypt) Wadi Degla)

Out:

No.	Pos.	Nation	Player
2	DF	GHA	William Mensah (loan return to (Egypt) Wadi Degla)
25	DF	BEL	Jonas Heymans (to (Netherlands) AZ)
27	DF	EGY	Ahmed Fawzy (loan return to (Egypt) Wadi Degla)
29	MF	EGY	Mohamed Abdel Wahed (loan return to (Egypt) Wadi Degla)
29	MF	RSA	Lance Davids (to (South Africa) Ajax Cape Town)
33	FW	BEL	Dolly Menga (on loan to (Italy) Torino)
37	FW	SLO	Uroš Palibrk (loan return to (Italy) AC Milan)
—	MF	BEL	Yassine Benali (on loan to (Belgium) Turnhout)
—	MF	BEL	Geoffry Hairemans (on loan to (Belgium) Turnhout)

=== Lokeren ===
In:

No.	Pos.	Nation	Player
2	DF	DEN	Alexander Scholz (from (Iceland) Stjarnan)
11	MF	ESP	Walter Fernández (from (Hungary) Videoton)
15	MF	BRA	Junior Dutra (from (Japan) Kashima Antlers)

Out:

No.	Pos.	Nation	Player
28	DF	BEL	Laurens De Bock (to (Belgium) Club Brugge)

=== Mechelen ===
In:

No.	Pos.	Nation	Player
11	MF	BEL	Mats Rits (from (Netherlands) Ajax)
25	DF	FRA	Jerry Vandam (from (France) Lille)

Out:

No.	Pos.	Nation	Player
8	DF	TPE	Xavier Chen (to (China) Guizhou Renhe)

=== Mons ===
In:

No.	Pos.	Nation	Player
11	FW	ISR	Shlomi Arbeitman (on loan from (Belgium) Gent)
20	DF	FRA	Grégory Lorenzi (from (France) Brest)
21	MF	ZIM	Vuza Nyoni (from (Belgium) Beerschot)
39	MF	BEL	Brice Ntambwe (from (England) Birmingham City)

Out:

No.	Pos.	Nation	Player
5	DF	CGO	Maël Lépicier (to (Belgium) Beerschot)
10	MF	COD	Zola Matumona (to (Angola) Primeiro de Agosto)
19	FW	FRA	Jérémy Perbet (on loan to (Spain) Villarreal)
20	MF	FRA	Benjamin Nicaise (released)
25	FW	BEL	Arnaud Biatour (to (Belgium) Visé)

=== OH Leuven ===
In:

No.	Pos.	Nation	Player
2	DF	CRO	Tomislav Mikulić (from (Belgium) Beerschot)
11	FW	BEL	Alessandro Cerigioni (from (Belgium) Lommel United)
16	DF	BEL	Cédric Buekers (from (Belgium) Sint-Truiden)

Out:

No.	Pos.	Nation	Player
9	FW	CMR	Christian Pouga (on loan to (Belgium) Lierse)
24	MF	BEL	Frederik Boi (on loan to (Belgium) Cercle Brugge)

=== Standard Liège ===
In:

No.	Pos.	Nation	Player
7	FW	IRI	Reza Ghoochannejhad (from (Belgium) Sint-Truiden)
9	FW	ROU	George Țucudean (from (Romania) Dinamo București)
10	MF	ROU	Adrian Cristea (on loan from (Romania) Petrolul Ploiești)
13	FW	JPN	Kensuke Nagai (from (Japan) Nagoya Grampus)
14	FW	JPN	Yuji Ono (from (Japan) Yokohama Marinos)
24	DF	CIV	Zié Diabaté (on loan from (France) Dijon)
—	DF	FRA	Loïc Nego (on loan from (Italy) Roma)

Out:

No.	Pos.	Nation	Player
2	DF	HAI	Reginal Goreux (to (Russia) Krylia Sovetov)
3	DF	POR	Yohan Tavares (on loan to (Portugal) Estoril)
5	DF	ISR	Rami Gershon (on loan to (Scotland) Celtic Glasgow)
7	DF	ENG	Zeki Fryers (to (England) Tottenham Hotspur)
9	FW	ISR	Dudu Biton (on loan to (Cyprus) APOEL)
10	MF	URU	Nacho González (on loan to (Spain) Hércules)
15	FW	BEL	Sébastien Pocognoli (to (Germany) Hannover 96)
31	FW	BEL	Marvin Ogunjimi (loan return to (Spain) Mallorca, who loaned him to (Belgium) Beerschot)
—	MF	ISL	Birkir Bjarnason (was on loan to (Italy) Pescara, now sold)
—	MF	URU	Guillermo Mendez (on loan to (Belgium) Sint-Truiden)
—	FW	ISR	Yadin Zaris (was on loan to (Hungary) Újpest, now loaned to (Belgium) Sint-Truiden)

=== Waasland-Beveren ===
In:

No.	Pos.	Nation	Player
4	MF	BEL	Mohammed Aoulad (on loan from (Belgium) Anderlecht)
10	FW	BEL	Jordan Remacle (on loan from (Belgium) Gent)
17	MF	BEL	Stijn De Smet (on loan from (Belgium) Gent)
21	DF	BEL	Jonas Ivens (on loan from (Netherlands) Groningen)
24	MF	BEL	René Sterckx (on loan from (Belgium) Anderlecht)

Out:

No.	Pos.	Nation	Player
10	MF	FRA	Mickael Seoudi (on loan to (Belgium) Mouscron-Péruwelz)
30	MF	BEL	Christophe Lepoint (loan return to (Belgium) Gent)

=== Zulte Waregem ===
In:

No.	Pos.	Nation	Player
17	MF	GUI	Ibrahima Conté (on loan from (Belgium) Gent)
—	MF	SEN	Mansour Diop (from (Senegal) Guédiawaye)
—	DF	SEN	Elhadji Ndoye (from (Senegal) Renaissance Dakar)

Out:

No.	Pos.	Nation	Player
7	FW	CAF	Habib Habibou (on loan to (England) Leeds United)
17	DF	BEL	David Vandenbroeck (on loan to (Belgium) Antwerp)
18	MF	BEL	Jérémy Serwy (on loan to (Belgium) WS Woluwe)
25	GK	BEL	Jasper Otte (on loan to (Belgium) Standaard Wetteren)
—	FW	BEL	Victor Christiaens (on loan to (Belgium) Oudenaarde)
—	MF	BLR	Mikhail Sivakov (was on loan to (Belarus) BATE Borisov, now sold)
