= 2010 Belgian Super Cup =

Anderlecht	Gent
1	0
- Date: 23 July 2010
- Venue: Constant Vanden Stock Stadium, Anderlecht
- Referee: Johan Verbist

The 2010 Belgian Super Cup was a football match played on 23 July 2010 between 2009–10 Belgian Pro League winners Anderlecht and 2009–10 Belgian Cup winners Gent. In a match with several chances for both teams, only Anderlecht managed to score once through Kouyaté. This meant the ninth Super Cup title for Anderlecht and left Gent still looking for their first win.

== Match details ==
23 July 2010
20:45 CET

Anderlecht	1–0	Gent
Kouyaté 30'	Report

Constant Vanden Stock Stadium, Brussels
Referee: Johan Verbist

Anderlecht	Gent

RSC ANDERLECHT:
GK	22	(Belgium) Davy Schollen
DF	30	(Belgium) Guillaume Gillet
DF	23	(Hungary) Roland Juhász
DF	16	(Senegal) Cheikhou Kouyaté
DF	3	(Belgium) Olivier Deschacht (c)
MF	19	(United States) Sacha Kljestan	(substituted off) 60'
MF	99	(Ivory Coast) Bakary Saré
MF	5	(Argentina) Lucas Biglia
FW	12	(Belgium) Thomas Chatelle	(substituted off) 61'
FW	11	(Morocco) Mbark Boussoufa
FW	9	(Argentina) Matías Suárez	(substituted off) 77'
Substitutes:
DF	7	(Czech Republic) Jan Lecjaks
MF	8	(Czech Republic) Jan Polák	(substituted on) 60'
MF	13	(Belgium) Jonathan Legear	(substituted on) 61'
DF	18	(Czech Republic) Lukáš Mareček
FW	21	(Belgium) Tom De Sutter	(substituted on) 77'
FW	25	(Argentina) Pablo Chavarría
GK	28	(Belgium) Michaël Cordier
MF	39	(Belgium) Ziguy Badibanga
Manager:
(Belgium) Ariël Jacobs

KAA GENT:
GK	29	(Serbia) Bojan Jorgačević
DF	17	(Venezuela) Roberto Rosales
DF	3	(Slovenia) Marko Šuler
DF	6	(Belgium) Stef Wils		(substituted off) 46'
DF	12	(Belgium) Kenny Thompson	(yellow card) 55'
MF	7	(Belgium) Tim Smolders		(substituted off) 71'
MF	8	(Belgium) Bernd Thijs (c)
MF	26	(Belgium) Christophe Lepoint
FW	9	(Senegal) Mbaye Leye
FW	11	(Belgium) Yassine Elghanassy
FW	16	(Senegal) Elimane Coulibaly		(substituted off) 72'
Substitutes:
DF	4	(Costa Rica) Roy Myrie
DF	5	(Norway) Erlend Hanstveit		(substituted on) 46'
FW	14	(Bosnia and Herzegovina) Adnan Čustović
FW	19	(Belgium) Stijn De Smet		(substituted on) 71'
FW	23	(Israel) Shlomi Arbeitman		(substituted on) 72'
MF	31	(France) Christophe Grondin
Manager:
(Belgium) Francky Dury

== See also ==
- 2010–11 Belgian Pro League
- 2010–11 Belgian Cup
