= 2010 Belgian Cup final =

- Event: 2009–10 Belgian Cup
Gent	Cercle Brugge
3	0
- Date: 15 May 2010
- Venue: King Baudouin Stadium, Brussels
- Referee: Paul Allaerts
- Attendance: 50,000

The 2010 Belgian Cup final, named Cofidis Cup after the sponsor, was played on 15 May 2010 between Gent and Cercle Brugge. It was the 55th Belgian Cup final. Gent won the match 3–0 for their third title.

== Road to the Final ==
Gent		Round	Cercle Brugge	
WS Woluwe [D3] H 3–1	Marić 42'; Biot 85' (o.g.); Coulibaly 90+5'	Round Six	Oud-Heverlee Leuven [D2] H 2–0	Božović 25', 32'
Germinal Beerschot [D1] H 1–0	Wils 88'	Round Seven	Zulte Waregem [D1] A 3–1	Van Eenoo 28'; Foley 39', 90+1'
Club Brugge [D1] A 4–1	Čustović 50', 72'; Leye 58'; Smolders 74'	Quarter Finals; First Leg	Anderlecht [D1] A 1–2	Božović 64'
Club Brugge [D1] H 1–0	Pieroni 44'	Quarter Finals; Second Leg	Anderlecht [D1] H 1–0	Božović 8'
Mechelen [D1] A 2–2	Ljubijankič 9'; Coulibaly 65'	Semi-finals; First Leg	Roeselare [D1] H 3–0	Vossen 29'; Cornelis 36'; Iachtchouk 72'
Mechelen [D1] H 1–0	Coulibaly 39'	Semi-finals; Second Leg	Roeselare [D1] A 1–3	Vossen 6' (pen.)

- Both clubs received a bye to round six.
- In square brackets is a letter that represents the opposition's division
  - [D1] = Belgian First Division
  - [D2] = Belgian Second Division
  - [D3] = Belgian Third Division

== Match details ==
15 May 2010
20:45 CET

Gent	3–0	Cercle Brugge
Coulibaly 35'; Leye 85'; Grondin 90+3'

King Baudouin Stadium, Brussels
Attendance: 50,000
Referee: Paul Allaerts

GENT:
GK	29	(Serbia) Bojan Jorgacević
DF	17	(Venezuela) Roberto Rosales
DF	3	(Slovenia) Marko Šuler
DF	6	(Belgium) Stef Wils
DF	12	(Belgium) Kenny Thompson	Booked
MF	8	(Belgium) Bernd Thijs (c)
MF	26	(Belgium) Christophe Lepoint	Booked
MF	11	(Belgium) Yassine El Ghanassy	Booked	(substituted off) 72'
FW	9	(Senegal) Mbaye Leye
FW	16	(Senegal) Elimane Coulibaly		(substituted off) 90'
FW	10	(Costa Rica) Randall Azofeifa		(substituted off) 83'
Substitutes:
MF	31	(France) Christophe Grondin		(substituted on) 83'
FW	30	(Slovenia) Zlatan Ljubijankič		(substituted on) 72'
FW	19	(Belgium) Stijn De Smet		(substituted on) 90'
Manager:
(Belgium) Michel Preud'Homme

CERCLE BRUGGE:
GK	25	(Belgium) Bram Verbist
DF	7	(Belgium) Denis Viane (c)		(substituted off) 34'
DF	16	(Slovenia) Dejan Kelhar
DF	8	(Belgium) Hans Cornelis
DF	4	(Belgium) Bernt Evens
MF	12	(Belgium) Frederik Boi		(substituted off) 46'
MF	17	(Belgium) Tony Sergeant		(substituted off) 64'
MF	21	(Belgium) Jelle Vossen
MF	14	(Ukraine) Sergiy Serebrennikov
FW	9	(Ukraine) Oleg Iachtchouk	Booked
FW	15	(Republic of Ireland) Dominic Foley
Substitutes:
DF	3	(Belgium) Anthony Portier		(substituted on) 34'
FW	18	(Brazil) Reynaldo		(substituted on) 46'
MF	30	(Belgium) Lukas Van Eenoo		(substituted on) 64'
Manager:
(Belgium) Glen De Boeck

MATCH RULES

- 90 minutes.
- 30 minutes of extra-time if necessary.
- Penalty shoot-out if scores still level.
- Maximum 7 named substitutes
- Maximum of 3 substitutions.

== See also ==
- 2009–10 Belgian Cup
