= Baguette (disambiguation) =

Baguette is a long thin loaf of French bread.

Baguette may also refer to:

- Baguette cut
- Baguette (horse), Australian bred Thoroughbred racehorse
- Bertrand Baguette (born 1986), Belgian racing driver
- Cyprien Baguette (born 1989), Belgian football goalkeeper
- Baguette (bag), handbag
