= Lépicier =

Lépicier is a French surname. Notable people with the surname include:

- Alexis Lépicier (1863–1936), French cardinal
- Maël Lépicier (born 1986), French-Congolese footballer
