= Roberto Rosales =

Venezuelan footballer (born 1988)

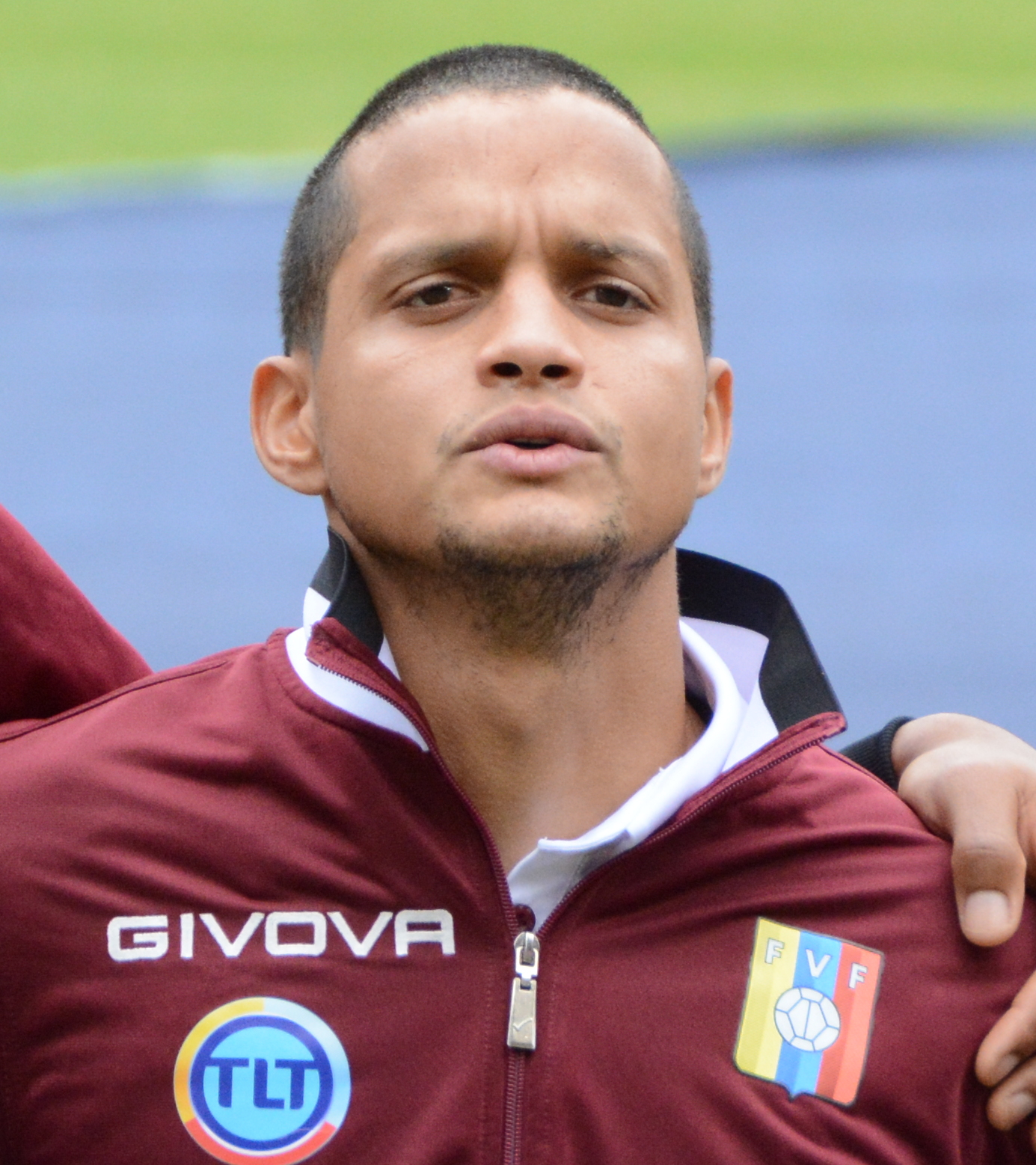
- Rosales with Venezuela in 2019

Personal information
- Full name: Roberto José Rosales Altuve
- Date of birth: 20 November 1988 (age 38)
- Place of birth: Caracas, Venezuela
- Height: 1.74 m (5 ft 9 in)
- Position: Right back

Team information
- Current team: Academia Puerto Cabello
- Number: 16

Youth career
- Deportivo Gulima
- Caracas

Senior career*
Years	Team	Apps	(Gls)
2006–2007	Caracas	2	(0)
2007–2010	Gent	72	(5)
2010–2014	Twente	118	(3)
2014–2019	Málaga	136	(2)
2018–2019	→ Espanyol (loan)	21	(3)
2019–2021	Leganés	42	(1)
2021–2023	AEK Larnaca	52	(1)
2023–2024	Sport Recife	25	(1)
2024–2025	Deportivo Táchira	49	(4)
2026–	Academia Puerto Cabello	2	(0)

International career^{‡}
2007	Venezuela U20	4	(0)
2007–	Venezuela	96	(1)
Medal record
Men's football
Representing Venezuela
Central American and Caribbean Games
Silver medal – second place	2006 Cartagena	Team
- * Club domestic league appearances and goals as of 9 November 2025 ‡ National team caps and goals as of 03:30, 19 January 2025 (UTC)

Roberto José Rosales Altuve (Spanish pronunciation: [roˈβeɾto rosales]; born 20 November 1988) is a Venezuelan professional footballer who plays for Academia Puerto Cabello and the Venezuela national team. Mainly a right back, he can also play as a right midfielder.

== Club career ==
=== Gent ===
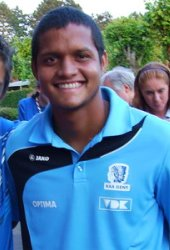
Rosales while playing for Gent

Born in Caracas, Rosales played for Pedagogico Caracas and Deportivo Gulima before moving to hometown's Caracas, where he made his senior debuts, appearing in two matches before signing a two-year deal with Gent on 30 May 2007 following a successful trial. Rosales was linked with a move to Anderlecht.

He made his debut for the latter on 14 July 2007, in a 4–0 win at Cliftonville, for that year's UEFA Intertoto Cup. It wasn't until on 16 September 2007 when he made his league debut for the club, coming on as a second-half substitute, in a 1–1 draw against Standard Liège. Despite being sent-off after a second bookable offence, in a 2–1 win over Charleroi on 3 May 2008, Rosales finished his first season, making twenty appearances in all competitions, including playing in the final of the Belgian Cup, making a start, in a 3–2 loss against Anderlecht.

In the 2008–09 season, Rosales established himself in the starting eleven and started the season well when he, along with the defense, helped the club keep a clean sheet, in a 5–0 win over Mons in the opening game of the season. As he was given a first-team opportunity, it was announced on 24 October 2008, Rosales signed a contract with the club, keeping him until 2011. Three weeks later, on 14 November 2008, he scored his first goal of the season, in a 3–2 loss against Westerlo. It wasn't until on 1 March 2009 when he scored his second goal of the season, in a 1–0 win over Lokeren. However, Rosales suffered a knee injury that kept him out of the rest of the season. Despite this, he finished his second season, making twenty-eight appearances and scoring two times in all competitions.

In the 2009–10 season, Rosales continued to rehabilitate from his injury and then made his first appearance of the season, in a 4–1 win over Lokeren on 22 August 2009. Having regained his first team place since returning from injury, Rosales then scored his first goal of the season, in a 2–1 win over Sint-Truiden on 24 October 2009. Rosales, again, scored two goals in two matches between 28 November 2009 and 4 December 2009 against Cercle Brugge and KV Mechelen respectively. As the 2009–10 season progressed, Rosales helped the club reach the final of the Belgium Cup after provided four assists in four matches in both legs against Club Brugge and Mechelen. In the final against Cercle Brugge, Rosales started in the final and helped them win 3–0. After playing in midfielder as some point during the season following an absent of numbers of midfielders, Rosales finished the season, making thirty-nine appearances and scoring three times in all competitions.

During his three years spell, Rosales appeared regularly for Gent and went on to make eighty-two appearances and scoring five times in all competitions.

=== FC Twente ===
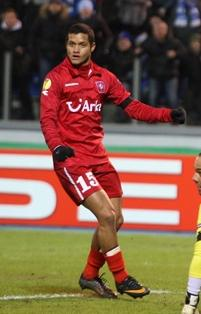
Rosales playing for Twente

Rosales joined Eredivisie side Twente in a three-year deal on 30 July 2010. Upon joining club, Rosales became a direct replacement for Ronnie Stam, who left for Premier League side Wigan Athletic and was presented to the media a few days later, where he was given a number fifteen shirt. However, his debut was soon delayed, due to work permit, and was granted work permit to play for the club on 19 August 2010.

After making his debut against Vitesse, where he made 9 minutes on 21 August 2010, Rosales made his first start on 29 August 2010, and played the full 90 minutes of a 4–0 home routing over Utrecht. Rosales scored his first goal for the club on 11 September 2010, in a 2–1 win over VVV-Venlo. On 7 December 2010, Rosales scored a goal in a 3–3 home draw against Tottenham Hotspur, for the season's UEFA Champions League, and became the first Venezuelan to do so. He continued to appear regularly for the Tukkers and despite being suspended, including a red card against Roda JC on 10 April 2011. Though he was on the bench that saw Twente beat Ajax 3–2 in the KNVB Cup final, Rosales finished his first season, making forty-five appearances and scoring two times in all competitions.

Ahead of the 2011–12 season, Rosales' performance saw him being linked to the likes of Real Madrid. Despite this, Rosales remained at the club, although he began competing with Tim Cornelisse over the right-back position and started the season well when he provided a hat-trick assists, in a 5–2 win over ADO Den Haag on 18 September 2011. Rosales then set up a goal for Marc Janko to score the winning goal, in a 1–0 against Fulham in a UEFA Europa League on 1 December 2011. After serving a one-match suspension, due to being booked for the fifth time that season, he scored on his return from suspension on 21 March 2012, in a 2–1 win over De Graafschap. Following his return, Rosales regained his first team place for the remainder of the season, making 41 appearances and scoring once in all competitions.

In the 2012–13 season, Rosales' transfer speculation continued when European clubs were keen on signing him. Despite this, Rosales stayed at the club and started his season well when he set up one of the goals, in a 4–1 win over Groningen in the opening game of the season and continued to be in the first team regular. Despite being suspended twice after being booked a multiple of times, as well as, his own injury concerns, Rosales went on to make forty-four appearances in all competitions.

In the 2013–14 season, Rosales helped the club with two clean sheets to the start of the season against RKC Waalwijk and Utrecht despite the club's slow start. Unfortunately, in a match against Heerenveen, in the second round of the KNVB Cup, he received a red card after a second bookable offence, in a 3–0 loss, eliminating from the tournament. Rosales then scored his first goal of the season, in a 3–2 loss against ADO Den Haag on 26 October 2013. His 100th league appearance for the club then came on 10 November 2013, in a 1–1 draw against PEC Zwolle. As the 2013–14 season progressed, Rosales faced a suspension after picking up a yellow card for the fifth time this season and his own injury concern, but finished the season, making thirty-one appearances and scoring once in all competitions.

At the end of the 2013–14 season, Rosales was expected to leave the club, with La Liga side Málaga keen on signing him when his contract was set to expire. It came after when he had yet responded to a new contract offered by the club.

=== Málaga ===
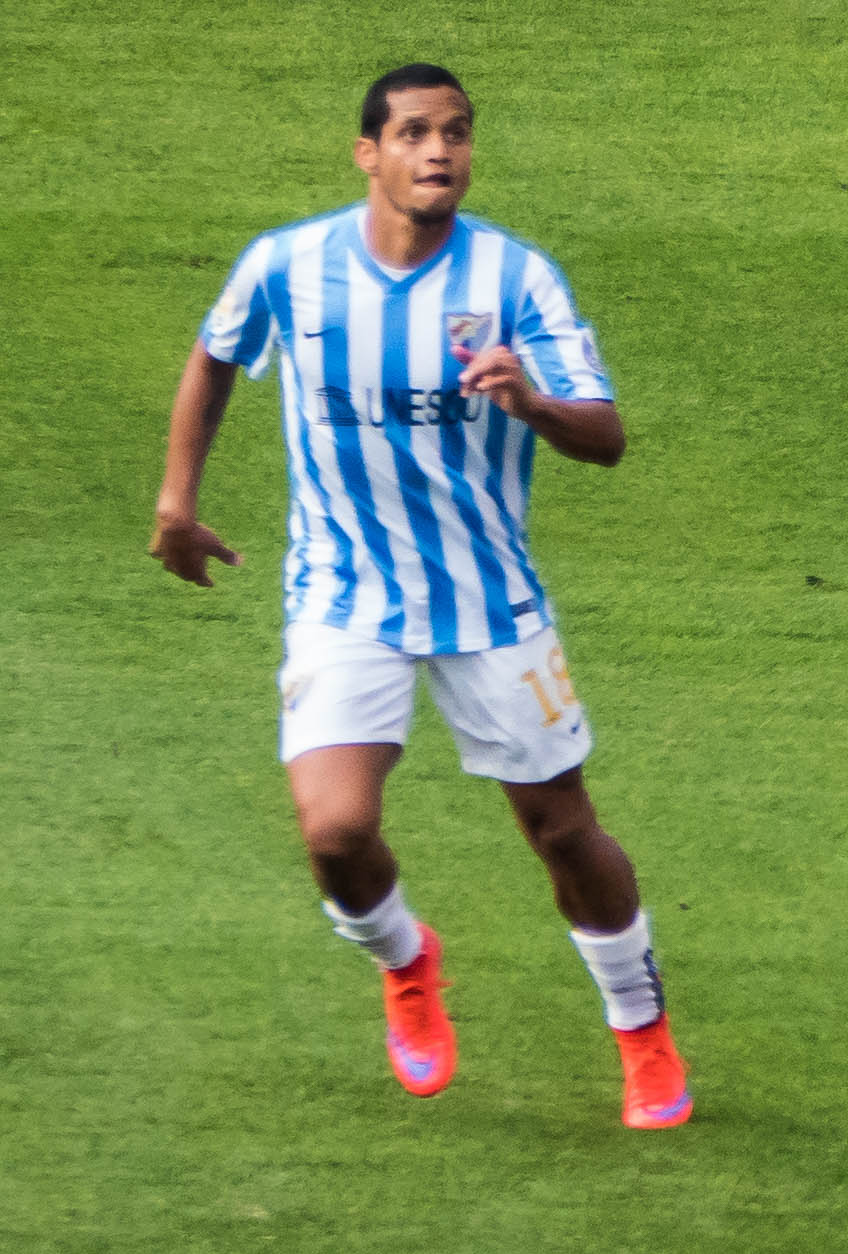
Rosales playing for Málaga in 2015

On 9 July 2014 Rosales moved to La Liga side Málaga, by agreeing to a three-year deal with the Andalusians. Upon joining the club, Rosales said the moving to Malaga was an important step of his career.

He made his debut in the competition on 23 August 2014, starting in a 1–0 home win against Athletic Bilbao. Since making his debut, Rosales established himself in the starting eleven as a right-back until he suffered an injury that kept him out for weeks. He then made his return from injury on 29 November 2014, in a 2–1 loss against Real Madrid. Rosales was in the squad against Barcelona on 21 February 2015, where he made his first start and played 90 minutes, as they beat them 1–0, in which he said it was the best game he played at the club. Rosales later finished his first season at the club, making forty appearances in all competitions.

In the 2015–16 season, Rosales continued to be in the first team regular as a right-back and his performance convinced the club to start negotiation over a contract for him. It came after when he set up one of the goals for Charles, who scored a hat-trick, in a 3–1 win over Real Sociedad on 3 October 2015, as well as, being linked with a move to Sevilla in the summer. As the 2014–15 season progressed, Rosasles' consecutive starts ended when he was suspended after picking a fifth yellow card against Granada on 8 April 2016 and after returning from suspension, he then suffered an injury during a match against Levante on 2 May 2016, that sidelined him for the remainder of the season. Despite this, Rosales went on to make thirty-six appearances in all competitions.

In the 2016–17 season, Rosales made his return from injury last season, where Malaga drew 1–1 against Osasuna in the opening game of the season. The following month, he signed a contract with the club, keeping him until 2019 and then scored his first goal for the club, in a 1–1 draw against Alavés on 16 October 2016. In a match against Barcelona on 20 November 2016, Rosales found himself involved with Neymar when he made a swift turn which saw the ball fly directly above Rosales as he slipped with his hands in the air, resulting him being slipped on the wet surface and ended up flat on his back.

==== Espanyol (loan) ====
On 31 August 2018, after the club was relegated to Segunda División, Rosales was loaned to RCD Espanyol for one year. He made his debut for Espanyol on 25 September 2018, playing full 90 minutes in 1–0 home victory against SD Eibar. He scored his first goal in a 2–4 loss against Real Madrid on 27 January 2019. In the last league game against Real Sociedad, Rosales scored the first goal of the match as his team went on to win the game 2-0 and qualify for Europa League after a 12-year wait.

=== Leganés ===
On 24 July 2019, it was announced that Rosales has agreed on a two-year contract with Spanish side CD Leganés, with an option of another year.

== International career ==
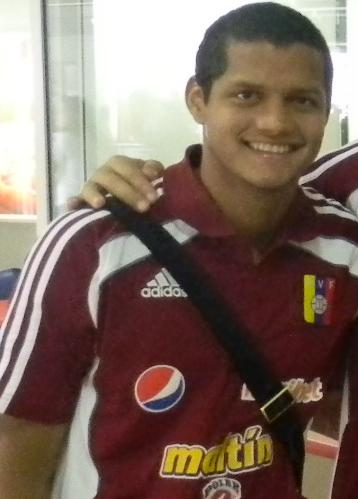
Rosales at the national side

Rosales made his international debut for Venezuela on 28 March 2007, playing the entire second half of a 5–0 routing over New Zealand. Since making his international debut, Rosales was then called up by the national team for the Copa América after making a handful of appearances for the past four years and helped the side reach the semi-final, finishing fourth place in the tournament. His 50th appearance for the national team came on 6 March 2014, in a 2–1 loss against Honduras.

Rosales was then called up for two more tournaments: the 2015 Copa América and the Copa América Centenario.

== Career statistics ==
=== Club ===
As of 13 May 2018

Appearances and goals by club, season and competition
Club	Season	League			National cup		Continental		Total	
Club	Season	Division	Apps	Goals	Apps	Goals	Apps	Goals	Apps	Goals
Caracas	2006–07	Venezuelan Primera División	2	0	0	0	0	0	2	0
Caracas	Total		2	0	0	0	0	0	2	0
Gent	2007–08	Belgian Pro League	15	0	0	0	—		15	0
Gent	2008–09	Belgian Pro League	25	2	1	0	2	0	28	2
Gent	2009–10	Belgian Pro League	32	3	7	0	—		39	3
Gent	Total		72	5	8	0	2	0	82	5
Twente	2010–11	Eredivisie	29	1	5	0	11	1	45	2
Twente	2011–12	Eredivisie	30	1	2	0	9	0	41	1
Twente	2012–13	Eredivisie	29	0	0	0	11	0	40	0
Twente	2013–14	Eredivisie	30	1	1	0	—		31	1
Twente	Total		118	3	8	0	31	1	157	4
Málaga	2014–15	La Liga	34	0	6	0	0	0	40	0
Málaga	2015–16	La Liga	35	0	1	0	—		36	0
Málaga	2016–17	La Liga	32	1	2	0	—		34	1
Málaga	2017–18	La Liga	35	1	1	0	—		36	1
Málaga	Total		136	2	10	0	—		146	2
Career total			328	10	26	0	33	1	387	11

=== International ===
As of match played 18 January 2025

Appearances and goals by national team and year
National team	Year	Apps	Goals
Venezuela	2007	6	0
Venezuela	2008	3	0
Venezuela	2009	4	0
Venezuela	2010	6	0
Venezuela	2011	15	0
Venezuela	2012	9	0
Venezuela	2013	6	0
Venezuela	2014	3	0
Venezuela	2015	10	0
Venezuela	2016	6	0
Venezuela	2017	0	0
Venezuela	2018	2	0
Venezuela	2019	10	1
Venezuela	2020	3	0
Venezuela	2021	6	0
Venezuela	2022	3	0
Venezuela	2023	3	0
Venezuela	2024	0	0
Venezuela	2025	1	0
Total		96	1

Scores and results list Venezuela's goal tally first.

List of international goals scored by Roberto Rosales
No.	Date	Venue	Opponent	Score	Result	Competition
1.	1 June 2019	Hard Rock Stadium, Miami Gardens, United States	Ecuador	1–0	1–1	Friendly

== Personal life ==
Rosales was born third siblings of the four children (two brothers and one sister). Like Roberto, his siblings are footballers too. Growing up, Rosales revealed that his father was strict towards his children, especially Roberto and learns three things from him: Modesty, sacrifice and discipline. While living in Netherlands, Rosales began taking Dutch lessons, revealing that he has been taking lessons twice a week.

== Honours ==
Caracas

- Venezuelan Primera División: 2006–07

Gent

- Belgian Cup: 2009–10

Twente

- KNVB Cup: 2010–11

Sport Recife

- Campeonato Pernambucano: 2024

Deportivo Táchira

- Venezuelan Primera División: 2024

Venezuela

- Kirin Challenge Cup: 2019
