= Mohamed Abdel Wahed =

Egyptian footballer (born 1981)

Personal information
- Date of birth: January 19, 1981 (age 45)
- Place of birth: Cairo, Egypt
- Height: 1.74 m (5 ft 9 in)
- Position: Defender

Youth career
- Tersana

Senior career*
| Years | Team | Apps | (Gls) |
| 2000–2001 | Tersana | 4 | (0) |
| 2001–2005 | Zamalek | 75 | (10) |
| 2005–2007 | Ismaily | 18 | (2) |
| 2007–2011 | Lierse | 86 | (23) |
| 2011–2014 | Wadi Degla | 12 | (0) |
| 2013 | → Lierse (loan) | | (0) |
| 2013–2014 | → Turnhout (loan) | | (0) |
| 2014–2015 | El Mokawloon | | |

International career^{‡}
| 2003 | Egypt | 1 | (0) |
- * Club domestic league appearances and goals as of April 23, 2011 ‡ National team caps and goals as of November 9, 2009

Mohamed Abdel Wahed (Arabic: مُحَمَّد عَبْد الْوَاحِد; born 19 January 1981) is a retired Egyptian footballer who played as a defender. He was a member of Egypt's U-21 national team, which got the bronze medal in the 2001 FIFA World Youth Championship held in Argentina.

== Titles as a player ==
Personal
Best Egyptian Rising Star (2001) by Akhbar El-Yom

3 For Egypt
World Youth Cup Bronze Medalist with Egyptian Team 2001
Francophone Games' Bronze Medalist with Egyptian Olympic Team 2001
African Youth Cup of Nations 3rd place 2001

9 For Zamalek
2 Egyptian League title (2002/2003 & 2003/2004)
2 Egyptian Super Cup (2000/2001 & 2001/2002)
1 Egyptian Cup Titles (2001/2002)
1 African Champions League title (2002)
1 African Super Cup title (2003)
1 Arab Club Championship Title (2003)
1 Egyptian Saudi Super Cup (2003)
