= Christophe Lepoint =

Belgian footballer (born 1984)

Personal information
- Full name: Christophe Paul F. Lepoint
- Date of birth: 24 October 1984 (age 42)
- Place of birth: Brussels, Belgium
- Height: 1.86 m (6 ft 1 in)
- Position: Central midfielder

Team information
- Current team: Kortrijk (caretaker manager)

Youth career
- 2002–2003: Anderlecht

Senior career*
Years	Team	Apps	(Gls)
2003–2005	1860 Munich	9	(0)
2005	Willem II	10	(0)
2005–2006	Gençlerbirliği	4	(0)
2006–2008	Tubize	56	(6)
2008–2009	Mouscron	29	(5)
2009–2015	Gent	102	(11)
2012	→ Waasland-Beveren (loan)	14	(5)
2015	Charlton Athletic	6	(0)
2015–2017	Zulte Waregem	73	(12)
2017–2021	Kortrijk	84	(5)
2021–2022	Mouscron	36	(3)
2022–2024	Seraing	52	(5)

International career
2003	Belgium U19	9	(2)
2003	Belgium U20	1	(2)
2004	Belgium U21	3	(0)
2010	Belgium	2	(1)

Managerial career
- 2024–2025: Kortrijk (U21)
- 2025–: Kortrijk (assistant)
- 2026–: Kortrijk (caretaker)
- * Club domestic league appearances and goals

Christophe Paul F. Lepoint (French pronunciation: [kʁistɔf ləpwɛ̃]; born 24 October 1984) is a Belgian professional football coach and a former central midfielder who is the caretaker manager for Belgian Pro League club Kortrijk.

== Club career ==
On 31 January 2011, he was seriously injured in a car accident. He fell asleep in the passenger seat of a car being driven by his teammate Sébastien Bruzzese who, it is alleged, had been drinking. Afterwards, he struggled to get back into the first team and was loaned out to Waasland-Beveren in the summer of 2012. After a series of good performances for Waasland-Beveren and with Gent struggling in the league, Gent offered to loan out Stijn De Smet and Jordan Remacle to allow Lepoint to return to Gent early.

On 29 January 2015, Lepoint signed for Charlton Athletic on a 2 1/2-year deal.

On 17 June 2015, Lepoint signed for Zulte Waregem for an undisclosed fee.

On 17 January 2021, he returned to Mouscron and signed a contract until July 2022.

On 3 June 2022, Lepoint signed a two-year contract with Seraing.

== International career ==
On 19 May 2010, he made his debut in the Belgium national team in a friendly match against Bulgaria in Brussels and scored the equaliser in a 2–1 win.

== Coaching career ==
On 14 September 2026, Lepoint was appointed caretaker manager of Kortrijk after the dismissal of Michiel Jonckheere.

== Career statistics ==
=== Club ===
As of match played 22 May 2019

Appearances and goals by club, season and competition
Club	Season	League			Cup		Other		Total	
Club	Season	Division	Apps	Goals	Apps	Goals	Apps	Goals	Apps	Goals
Gençlerbirliği	2005–06	Süper Lig	4	0	0	0	—		4	0
Mouscron	2008–09	Belgian First Division	29	5	0	0	—		29	5
Gent	2009–10	Belgian Pro League	34	6	6	0	4 (Note: Appearances in the UEFA Europa League)	0	44	6
Gent	2010–11	Belgian Pro League	10	2	1	0	5 (Note: One Appearance in the Belgian Super Cup, Two appearances in the UEFA Champions League and Two appearances in the UEFA Europa League)	0	16	2
Gent	2012–13	Belgian Pro League	12	1	1	0	—		13	1
Gent	2013–14	Belgian Pro League	29	2	6	1	—		35	3
Gent	2014–15	Belgian Pro League	17	0	3	4	—		20	4
Gent	Total		102	11	17	5	9	0	128	16
Waasland-Beveren (loan)	2012–13	Belgian Pro League	14	5	2	0	2 (Note: Appearances in the 2013 Europa League play-offs)	0	18	5
Charlton Athletic	2014–15	Football League Championship	6	0	0	0	—		6	0
Zulte Waregem	2015–16	Belgian Pro League	37	10	2	0	—		39	10
Zulte Waregem	2016–17	Belgian First Division A	36	2	4	0	—		40	2
Zulte Waregem	Total		73	12	6	0	0	0	79	12
Kortrijk	2017–18	Belgian First Division A	23	1	1	0	—		24	1
Kortrijk	2018–19	Belgian First Division A	33	3	0	0	—		33	3
Kortrijk	Total		56	4	1	0	0	0	57	4
Career total			284	37	26	5	11	0	321	42

=== International goals ===
Goal	Date	Venue	Opponent	Score	Result	Competition
1	19 May 2010	Stade Roi Baudouin, Brussels	Bulgaria	2–1	Won	Friendly

== Honours ==
Gent

- Belgian Pro League: 2009–10 runners-up
- Belgian Cup: 2009–10

Zulte Waregem

- Belgian Cup: 2016–17
