= Jean-Christophe Vergerolle =

French footballer (born 1985)

Personal information
- Date of birth: 12 July 1985 (age 41)
- Place of birth: Paris, France
- Height: 1.88 m (6 ft 2 in)
- Position: Defender

Team information
- Current team: FC Saint-Louis Neuweg

Senior career*
| Years | Team | Apps | (Gls) |
| 2005–2007 | RC Strasbourg | 15 | (0) |
| 2007–2009 | Guingamp | 37 | (0) |
| 2009–2010 | Arles | 17 | (0) |
| 2011–2013 | Charleroi | 11 | (1) |
| 2013–2014 | FC Brussels | 10 | (0) |
| 2014–2015 | Mons | 26 | (1) |
| 2015–2016 | Deinze | 18 | (0) |
| 2016–2018 | RWS Bruxelles | 15 | (0) |
| 2019– | Saint-Louis Neuweg | 0 | (0) |
- * Club domestic league appearances and goals as of 29 January 2019

Jean-Christophe Vergerolle (born 12 July 1985 in Paris, Île-de-France) is a French footballer currently playing for Belgian club Deinze.

Vergerolle signed for Arles from En Avant Guingamp on 20 July 2009 and was released in the end of November. He had a trial with Levski Sofia but it was ended. In July 2011 Vergerolle signed for Belgian Second Division outfit Royal Charleroi. On 31 January 2013 he signed for FC Brussels where he stayed until the team dissolved in the summer of 2014. As a free player he moved to Mons.

In 2019 he moved to Saint-Louis Neuweg.
