= Franck Mawuena =

Togolese footballer

Personal information
- Full name: Kwame Franck Elie Mawuena
- Date of birth: November 21, 1992 (age 33)
- Place of birth: Lomé, Togo
- Height: 1.84 m (6 ft 1/2 in)
- Position: Striker

Senior career*
Years	Team	Apps	(Gls)
2011–2012	Gençlerbirliği	2	(0)
2012–2013	Beerschot	0	(0)
2013–2014	Wetteren (loan)	11	(0)
2016	Dacia	0	(0)
2016–2020	Dynamic Togo	38	(5)
2020–2023	AS Douanes	0	(0)
2023–2025	Remo Stars	39	(9)
2025–2026	Tuwaiq		

International career^{‡}
2015–	Togo	6	(0)
- * Club domestic league appearances and goals as of 13 November 2024 ‡ National team caps and goals as of 17 November 2024

Kwame Franck Elie Mawuena (born November 21, 1992, in Lomé) is a Togolese football striker playing currently.

== Career statistics ==
=== International ===
As of match played 17 November 2024

Appearances and goals by national team and year
National team	Year	Apps	Goals
Togo	2015	1	0
Togo	2017	2	0
Togo	2024	3	0
Total		6	0
