= Jens Podevijn =

Belgian footballer (born 1989)

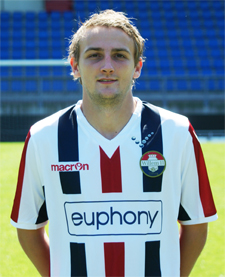

Personal information
- Full name: Jens Podevijn
- Date of birth: 18 July 1989 (age 37)
- Place of birth: Aalst, Belgium
- Height: 1.76 m (5 ft 9 1/2 in)
- Position: Striker

Team information
- Current team: FCV Dender EH
- Number: 17

Youth career
- Eendracht Aalst

Senior career*
Years	Team	Apps	(Gls)
2006–2012	Eendracht Aalst	99	(11)
2012–2014	Willem II	28	(3)
2014–	FCV Dender EH	49	(1)
- * Club domestic league appearances and goals as of 2 January 2016

Jens Podevijn (born 18 July 1989 in Aalst) is a Belgian professional footballer who plays as a striker and who plays for FCV Dender EH. He formerly played for Eendracht Aalst and Willem II.

== Club career ==
Podevijn was born in Aalst. He began his senior career at his local club Eendracht Aalst, where he made 99 domestic league appearances and scored 11 goals between 2006 and 2012. In 2012, Podevijn moved to the Netherlands to join Willem II. During his time with the club, he made 28 league appearances and scored 3 goals. In 2014, he returned to Belgium, signing with FCV Dender EH, where he made over 40 appearances.
