= Conor Laerenbergh =

Belgian footballer

Personal information
- Date of birth: 18 March 1993 (age 33)
- Place of birth: Wilrijk, Belgium
- Height: 1.79 m (5 ft 10 in)
- Position: Left winger

Team information
- Current team: Cappellen
- Number: 7

Youth career
- Royal Antwerp

Senior career*
Years	Team	Apps	(Gls)
2011–2013	Beerschot AC	18	(2)
2013	Royal Antwerp	11	(1)
2013–2015	Sint-Niklaas	39	(8)
2015–2016	Avanti Stekene		
2016–2017	VV STEEN		
2017	FCS Mariekerke-Branst		
2017–2019	KHO Wolvertem-Merchtem		
2019–2020	SC Dikkelvenne	22	(7)
2021	VV STEEN		
2021–2023	FCS Mariekerke-Branst		
2023–2024	HRS Haasdonk		
2024–2025	SK Berlare		
2025	Erpe-Mere	9	(1)
2026–	Cappellen	0	(0)
- * Club domestic league appearances and goals as of 26 January 2026

Conor Laerenbergh (born 18 March 1993) is a Belgian professional footballer who plays as a winger for Cappellen.
