= Jérémy Huyghebaert =

Belgian footballer

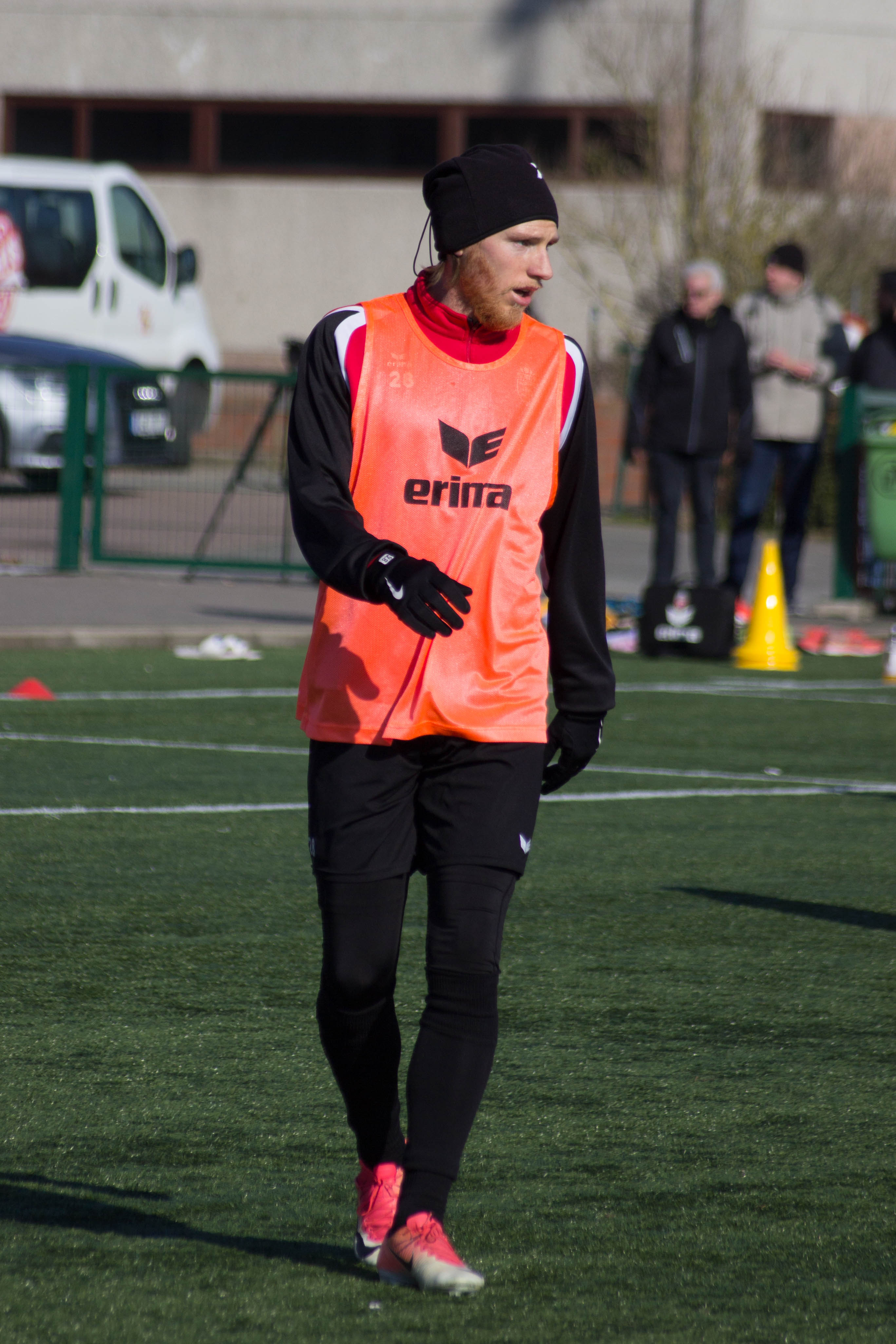

Personal information
- Date of birth: 7 January 1989 (age 37)
- Place of birth: Mouscron, Belgium
- Height: 1.80 m (5 ft 11 in)
- Position: Left back

Youth career
- 1994–2007: Excelsior Mouscron

Senior career*
Years	Team	Apps	(Gls)
2007–2008	Excelsior Mouscron	4	(0)
2008–2010	Auxerre	0	(0)
2009–2010	→ Roeselare (loan)	43	(0)
2011–2012	Mechelen	0	(0)
2011–2012	→ Roeselare (loan)	29	(0)
2012–2014	Mouscron-Péruwelz	43	(2)
2014–2016	RWS Bruxelles	45	(0)
2016–2020	Royal Mouscron	65	(0)
2018–2019	→ Xamax (loan)	8	(0)
2020–2023	FC U Craiova	91	(2)

International career
2005–2006	Belgium U17	17	(1)
2006–2007	Belgium U18	13	(1)
2006–2008	Belgium U19	16	(0)
2008–2010	Belgium U20	2	(0)
2007–2010	Belgium U21	8	(0)
- * Club domestic league appearances and goals as of 19 May 2023

Jérémy Huyghebaert (born 7 January 1989) is a Belgian footballer who plays as a left back. In his career, Huyghebaert also played for teams such as R.E. Mouscron, Roeselare, WS Bruxelles, Excel Mouscron or FC U Craiova among others.

== Honours ==
RWS Bruxelles

- Belgian Second Division: 2015–16

FC U Craiova

- Liga II: 2020–21
