= Stijn De Smet =

Belgian footballer (born 1985)

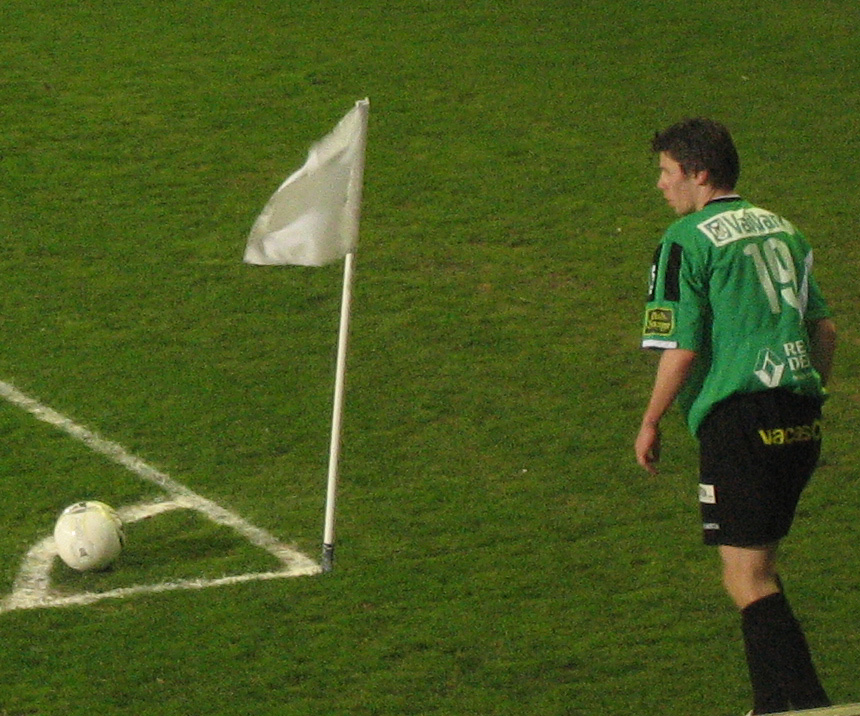
- De Smet with Cercle Brugge in 2008

Personal information
- Full name: Stijn Camiel De Smet
- Date of birth: 27 March 1985 (age 41)
- Place of birth: Bruges, Belgium
- Height: 1.83 m (6 ft 0 in)
- Positions: Attacking midfielder; forward

Youth career
- 1992–1997: Jabbeke
- 1997–2003: Cercle Brugge

Senior career*
| Years | Team | Apps | (Gls) |
| 2003–2009 | Cercle Brugge | 151 | (30) |
| 2009–2013 | Gent | 50 | (7) |
| 2011–2012 | → Westerlo (loan) | 18 | (0) |
| 2012–2013 | → Waasland-Beveren (loan) | 13 | (4) |
| 2013–2018 | Kortrijk | 54 | (17) |
| 2018–2019 | Roeselare | 23 | (1) |
| 2019–2020 | Zwevezele | 18 | (1) |
| Total | | 320 | (60) |

International career
| 2004 | Belgium U19 | 3 | (0) |
| 2004–2008 | Belgium U21 | 18 | (3) |
| 2008 | Belgium | 1 | (0) |
- * Club domestic league appearances and goals

Stijn Camiel De Smet (Dutch pronunciation: [ˈstɛin də ˈsmɛt]; born 27 March 1985) is a Belgian former professional footballer who played as an attacking midfielder.

He received his first call-up to the Belgium squad in 2008 and made his debut as a starter against Morocco in a friendly at King Baudouin Stadium.

== Club career ==
=== Cercle Brugge ===
De Smet started his football career at amateur club Jabbeke. At the age of 12, he made moved to the youth academy of professional club Cercle Brugge, despite receiving an offer from city rivals Club Brugge. At Cercle, he progressed through the youth teams, and eventually made his senior debut in the 2003–04 season in a 0–0 home draw against Westerlo. The following year, De Smet grew into a starter, scoring four goals in 27 games.

In December 2006, De Smet was invited for a trial with Blackburn Rovers, the partner team of Cercle. Sadly for De Smet, a knee injury suffered in a match against Anderlecht forced him to stay in Belgium.

De Smet quickly aroused interest from other teams, and was considered Cercle's most talented player since Thomas Buffel. Strong play alongside new signing Tom De Sutter, as well as 10 goals in 33 appearances during the 2007–08 season, meant that Eredivisie clubs AZ and PSV showed interest.

=== Gent ===
On 17 July 2009, De Smet signed a five-year contract with league rivals for Gent, replacing the outgoing Bryan Ruiz who had signed with Twente, for a fee reported to be around €1.2 million. At Gent, he won the 2009–10 Belgian Cup, beating his former club Cercle Brugge 3–0 in the final. De Smet came on as a 90th-minute substitute for Elimane Coulibaly in the game.

On 25 July 2011, De Smet was sent on a season-long loan to Westerlo. Due to an injury, he only played 23 games. From the 2012–13 season, he returned to Gent, but during the winter break he was sent on another loan, this time to Waasland-Beveren alongside Jordan Remacle. At Beveren he was reunited with his former coach at Cercle, Glen De Boeck.

=== Kortrijk ===
In the 2013–14 season, De Smet signed a two-year contract with Kortrijk with an option for an additional year. After three successful seasons at the West Flemish club, his contract was not renewed following the 2017–18 season.

=== Roeselare ===
For the 2018–19 season, De Smet moved to Roeselare as a free agent, signing a one-year contract with an option for an additional year.

=== Retirement ===
At the end of the 2018–19 season, it was announced that De Smet would retire from professional football and continue his career with amateur club Zwevezele. De Smet announced his retirement in December 2019. He later founded his own real estate agency.

== International career ==
In the 2004–05 season, De Smet was selected for the matches of the Belgian national under-21 team. He was also part of the squad that qualified for the 2008 Summer Olympics in Beijing.

De Smet was selected for Belgium for the first time for an unofficial friendly against Standard Liège, as a replacement for the injured Thomas Chatelle. De Smet played the last 10 minutes of the match. He was selected again for the friendly against Morocco, and was part of the starting eleven.

== Honours ==
Gent

- Belgian Cup: 2009–10
