= Christophe Grondin =

French footballer (born 1983)

Personal information
- Date of birth: 2 September 1983 (age 43)
- Place of birth: Toulouse, France
- Height: 5 ft 11 in (1.80 m)
- Position: Defensive midfielder

Youth career
- –: FC Toulouse
- –: Birmingham City

Senior career*
Years	Team	Apps	(Gls)
1999–2000	FC Toulouse	0	(0)
2000–2003	Birmingham City	0	(0)
2003–2004	K.S.K. Ronse	28	(1)
2004–2005	FC Toulouse	16	(1)
2005–2007	Cercle Brugge K.S.V.	74	(1)
2007–2012	Gent	101	(3)
2012–2013	Al-Faisaly	25	(0)
- * Club domestic league appearances and goals as of 17 May 2011

Christophe Grondin (born 2 September 1983) is a French footballer who plays as a midfielder.

== Biography ==
Grondin was born in the French city of Toulouse, of Malagasy and Réunion descent.

The defensive midfielder was a youth player at French side Toulouse. In 2000, he joined the English club Birmingham City. He remained there for 3 years and moved to the Belgian Second Division side K.S.K. Ronse. Grondin helped keep Ronse in the Second Division with a goal in the last match.

He moved back to Toulouse in 2004. During the winter of the 2004-2005 season, he was loaned to the Belgian side Cercle Brugge. They signed Grondin at the end of the season. He is contracted until mid 2008.

Grondin wanted to be able to be a regular player and quickly became a key member of Cercle Brugge's side. During the winter of the season 2006-07, it was reported that French and English teams were interested in Grondin. At the end of that season, Grondin was chosen as Player of the Year by the Cercle Brugge fans.

On 29 January 2007 Grondin was called up for the first time to play for the national team of Madagascar, against FC Toulouse. This match was not registered as an official friendly by FIFA, so Grondin is not capped as a player for Madagascar and he still can play for France. But Grondin has acquired the Togolese nationality and was called up by coach Jean Thissen to play for the national team of that country.

On 22 May 2007 Grondin signed a contract with the Belgian club AA Gent until 2011, where he stayed until the summer of 2012, when he moved to Al-Faisaly.

== Honours ==
K.A.A. Gent

- Belgian Cup (1): 2009–10
