= Cyprien Baguette =

Belgian footballer

Personal information
- Date of birth: 12 May 1989 (age 37)
- Place of birth: La Louviere, Belgium
- Height: 1.88 m (6 ft 2 in)
- Position: Goalkeeper

Team information
- Current team: RSC Brainois

Senior career*
Years	Team	Apps	(Gls)
2008–2014	Charleroi	31	(0)
2013	→ FC Brussels (loan)	9	(0)
2018–	RSC Brainois	?	(?)

International career
2005–2006	Belgium U17	5	(0)
2008	Belgium U19	3	(0)
2009	Belgium U21	1	(0)
- * Club domestic league appearances and goals

Cyprien Baguette (born 12 May 1989) is a Belgian football goalkeeper who currently plays for Jurbise A.
