= Adnan Čustović =

Bosnian football manager (born 1978)

Personal information
- Date of birth: 16 April 1978 (age 48)
- Place of birth: Mostar, SR Bosnia and Herzegovina, SFR Yugoslavia
- Height: 1.85 m (6 ft 1 in)
- Position: Forward

Team information
- Current team: Zob Ahan (assistant)

Youth career
- 1991–1996: Velež Mostar

Senior career*
Years	Team	Apps	(Gls)
1996–1998	Triglav Kranj	35	(16)
1998–2001	Le Havre	27	(2)
2002–2004	Laval	57	(11)
2004–2005	Amiens	20	(4)
2005–2008	Mouscron	103	(45)
2009–2010	Gent	42	(13)
2010–2012	Germinal Beerschot	47	(6)
2012	→ Mouscron-Péruwelz (loan)	10	(5)
2012–2014	Tournai	54	(20)
Total		395	(122)

International career
2007	Bosnia and Herzegovina	5	(1)

Managerial career
- 2014–2015: Kortrijk (assistant)
- 2015–2017: Oostende (assistant)
- 2017: Oostende (caretaker)
- 2017–2018: Oostende
- 2018–2019: Waasland-Beveren
- 2020: Bosnia and Herzegovina (assistant)
- 2020: Oostende
- 2021–2022: Shanghai Port (assistant)
- 2022: Kortrijk
- 2023: Hajduk Split (assistant)
- 2025: Gol Gohar (assistant)
- 2025–: Zob Ahan (assistant)
- * Club domestic league appearances and goals

Adnan Čustović (born 16 April 1978) is a Bosnian professional football manager and former player who is currently an assistant manager at Persian Gulf Pro League club Zob Ahan.

== Club career ==
Čustović started his career at local side Velež Mostar in 1991, before joining Slovenian Second League team Triglav Kranj in 1996. He later moved to France, where he played for Ligue 1 and Ligue 2 teams Le Havre, Laval and Amiens. On 21 December 2005, after three years, he left Mouscron and moved to Gent.

In 2010, Čustović joined Germinal Beerschot, who loaned him out to the successor of his previous club Mouscron, namely Mouscron-Péruwelz in 2012. After the loan, he left for Belgian Second Division team Tournai. Čustović finished his playing career at Tournai in 2014, retiring at the age of 36.

== International career ==
Čustović made his debut for the Bosnia and Herzegovina national team against Norway on 24 March 2007. On 2 June 2007, he experienced his first notable moment for the national team by scoring his first international goal when he headed the winner over Turkey from a corner kick taken by Mirko Hrgović.

He has earned a total of 5 caps, scoring 1 goal. His final international was a September 2007 European Championship qualification match against Moldova.

=== International goals ===
Goal	Date	Venue	Opponent	Score	Result	Competition
1.	2 June 2007	Asim Ferhatović Hase Stadium, Sarajevo, Bosnia and Herzegovina	Turkey	3–2	3–2	UEFA Euro 2008 qualifying

== Managerial career ==
=== Early career ===
Right after finishing his playing career, Čustović started his managerial career. From 2014 to 2015, he was the assistant manager at Kortrijk and then from 2015 to 2017, Čustović was assistant at Oostende.

=== Oostende ===
In September 2017, Yves Vanderhaeghe, Oostende manager at the time, was sacked after a poor start to the season when the club collected only one point in seven games and were bottom of the league. Čustović was named interim manager of Oostende, but after two wins and one draw in three games, thus collecting seven points in those three games, he was given a full contract, which was to last until the end of the season. At the end of the season, the club avoided relegation and Čustović was praised by fans as a result. He left the club after the end of the season.

=== Waasland-Beveren ===
On 17 November 2018, Čustović was appointed as the new manager of Waasland-Beveren. His first match in charge was a league game at home to Royal Excel Mouscron on 24 November 2018, which ended in a 1–2 loss. Čustović's most memorable moment at the club was a 2–1 victory over league champions Club Brugge on 7 December 2018. Following a bad start to the 2019–20 season, he was relieved of his duties on 26 August 2019.

=== Bosnia and Herzegovina ===
On 25 January 2020, Čustović was named as an assistant of Bosnia and Herzegovina national team head coach Dušan Bajević.

=== Return to Oostende ===
On 4 March 2020, Čustović was once again appointed as the manager of Oostende. After only one game as Oostende's manager, he was released by the club on 7 June 2020.

=== Kortrijk ===
Čustović was hired as the manager of Kortrijk on 1 September 2022. He was fired on 14 November 2022 after a seven-game winless streak.

=== Hajduk Split ===
On 5 January 2023, Čustović was hired by Hajduk Split as an assistant manager to Ivan Leko.

== Managerial statistics ==
As of 7 March 2020

Managerial record by team and tenure
Team	Nat	From	To	Record				
Team	Nat	From	To	P	W	D	L	Win %
Oostende (caretaker)	(Belgium)	17 September 2017	17 October 2017	4	2	1	1	50.00
Oostende	(Belgium)	17 October 2017	30 June 2018	32	13	9	10	40.63
Waasland-Beveren	(Belgium)	17 November 2018	26 August 2019	30	8	6	16	26.67
Oostende	(Belgium)	4 March 2020	7 June 2020	1	0	0	1	0.00
Total				67	23	16	28	34.33

== Honours ==
=== Player ===
Triglav Kranj

- Slovenian Second League: 1997–98

Gent

- Belgian Cup: 2009–10

Mouscron-Péruwelz

- Belgian Third Division A: 2011–12
