= Stef Wils =

Belgian footballer

Personal information
- Date of birth: 8 February 1982 (age 44)
- Place of birth: Turnhout, Belgium
- Height: 1.87 m (6 ft 1 1/2 in)
- Position: Centre back

Youth career
- KVV Vosselaar
- FC Tielen

Senior career*
Years	Team	Apps	(Gls)
2001–2006	Lierse	106	(5)
2006–2008	Westerlo	68	(6)
2009–2011	Gent	83	(8)
2011–2012	Westerlo	13	(1)
2012–2015	Cercle Brugge	75	(1)
2015–2018	Haladás	77	(5)
2018–2019	Lyra-Lierse		

Managerial career
- 2019–2025: Antwerp (youth)
- 2025: Antwerp
- * Club domestic league appearances and goals

Stef Wils (born 8 February 1982) is a Belgian professional football coach and a former centre back who was most recently the head coach of Antwerp.

== Playing career ==
Wils started his career at the highest level of Belgian football with Lierse, where he remained 5 seasons. He then signed for Westerlo where he was supposed to replace Chris Janssens. Wils made his move to Gent during the winter transfer window of 2008–09, before returning to Westerlo in August 2011, signing a three-year contract. After the relegation of Westerlo in 2012, he moved to Cercle Brugge. He later played for Haladás and Lyra-Lierse.

== Coaching career ==
On 22 June 2025, Wils was appointed head coach of Antwerp. Later that year, he was dismissed from his position on 23 November, following a 1–2 home defeat against FCV Dender EH, the bottom-placed team in the Belgian Pro League.

== Honours ==
K.A.A. Gent

- Belgian Cup (1): 2009–10
