= 2009–10 Belgian Cup =

Tournament details
- Country: Belgium

Final positions
- Champions: Gent
- Runners-up: Cercle Brugge

The 2009–10 Belgian Cup (also known as Cofidis Cup because of sponsoring purposes) was the 55th season of the main knockout football competition in Belgium. It commenced on 25 July 2009 with the first matches of Round 1 and concluded with the Final on 15 May 2010. Genk were the defending champions. The competition was won by Gent.

== Competition format ==
The competition consists of ten rounds. The first seven rounds are held as single-match elimination rounds. If the match remains tied after 90 minutes in the first three rounds, penalties are taken immediately. In rounds four to seven, when tied after 90 minutes first an extra time period of 30 minutes is played followed by penalties if still necessary. The quarter- and semi-finals are played as Two-legged ties, where the team winning both matches on aggregate advances. The final is played as a single match at a neutral venue.

Teams enter the competition in different rounds, based upon their 2008–09 league affiliation. Teams from the fourth-level Promotion or lower begin in Round 1. Third Division teams enter in Round 3, with Second Division teams joining in the following round. Teams from the Belgian First Division enter in Round 6.

== Starting Rounds ==
The starting five rounds feature only teams of lower divisions and all matches are played during the summer and early fall, mostly in July and August.

=== Round 1 ===
The matches were played on 25 and 26 July 2009.

Tie no	Home team	Score	Away team
1	VV.Sparta Ursel	1-6	SK.Zingem
2	K.Sassport Boezinge	2-1	SK.Eernegem
3	Football Club Gullegem	1-1 (3-4p)	SV.Wevelgem City
4	W.S.Lovrienden Lotenhulle	0-5	Torhout 1992 km.
5	K.F.C.Izegem	2-1	Sporting W.I.Harelbeke
6	SK.Staden	0-15	K.V.V. Koksijde
7	K.V.Eendracht Aalter	0-2	K.Olsa Brakel
8	K.SC.Blankenberge	2-1	K.WS.Club Lauwe
9	K.FC.Varsenare	1-0	VC.Zevergem Sp.
10	K.FC.Sparta Petegem	3-0	R.Knokke FC.
11	K.SV.Diksmuide	1-0	SVD.Kortemark
12	SV.Anzegem	1-2	K.Sint-Eloois-Winkel Sp.
13	K.BS.Poperinge	3-2	VG.Oostende
14	K.FC.Evergem-Center	1-3	K.VK.Ieper
15	K.SK.L.Ternat	1-0	SK.Terjoden-Welle
16	K.Vilvoorde FC.	0-3	K.Londerzeel SK.
17	K.Racing Club Bambrugge	2-1	K.VC.Jong Lede
18	Verbroedering Meldert	2-1	Tempo Overijse
19	K.FC.Eendr.Zele	5-1	R.Un.Auderghem
20	Sporting Eizeringen	0-2	K.SC.Grimbergen
21	K.V.Tervuren	1-3	K.Olympia SC.Wijgmaal
22	K.Eendr.Opstal	0-2	K.OVC.Sterrebeek
23	Dilbeek Sport	8-2	FC.Forest
24	Korbeek Sport	1-1 (4-2p)	KFC.Rhodienne-Verrewinkel
25	R.Racing Club de Waterloo	0-3	SK.St.P.Opwijk
26	K.SK.Halle	1-1 (4-3p)	SK.Berlare
27	K.FC.Duffel	3-0	K.SK.Retie Branddonk
28	K.Berchem Sport 2004	2-2 (5-3p)	K.FC.Zwarte Leeuw
29	KFC.Oosterzonen Oosterw.	0-2	K.Lyra TSV.
30	K.V.Bonheiden	2-2 (5-4p)	K.Schelle Sport
31	K.VC.Oostmalle Sp.	0-4	K.FC.O.Wilrijk
32	K.Nieuwmoer FC.	2-3	K.FC.St.-Lenaarts
33	KFC.Vrasene	2-0	K.Witgoor Sport Dessel
34	K.SK Heist	5-0	Zandvliet Sport
35	K.FC.Sp.St-Gillis Waas	0-0 (3-4p)	K.SV.Temse
36	K.VV.W.S.Sombeke	0-4	K.FC.Lille
37	K.FC.Katelijne-Waver	1-0	K.Tubantia Borgerhout VK.
38	Verbr.Geel-Meerhout	4-0	Rochus Deurne
39	K.FC.De Kempen T.L.	1-1 (5-4p)	K.FC.Schoten SK.
40	K.SV.Bornem	5-0	K.Ternesse VV.Wommelgem
41	K.Vlijtingen VV.	5-0	VKM. Sint-Truiden
42	K.Alt-Hoeselt VV.	0-3	K.Lutlommel VV.

Tie no	Home team	Score	Away team
43	K.Esperanza Neerpelt	3-1	SC.Zichen-Zussen-Bolder
44	K.VV.Verbr.Maasmechelen	0-6	K.Herk-De-Stad FC.
45	K.VK.Beringen	2-2 (4-5p)	K.VV.Heusden-Zolder
46	Spouwen-Mopertingen	3-1	Zutendaal V.V.
47	K.SK.Bree	0-1	VV.Thes Sport Tessenderlo
48	Real Neeroeteren-Maaseik	1-1 (3-4p)	K.SK.Hasselt
49	K.Patro Eisden Maasmech.	3-0	S.K. Moelingen
50	K.Overpeltse VV.	1-3	K.ESK.Leopoldsburg
51	Daring Club de Cointe	1-1 (4-3p)	R.Spa FC.
52	R.FC.Tilleur St.-Gilles	bye	
53	R.Sprimont Comblain Sport	4-0	R.CS.Welkenraedt
54	Solières Sport	1-2	RFC.Turkania Faymonville
55	ET.Elsautoise	bye	
56	R.FC.Vyle-Tharoul	1-2	Cité Sport Grace-Hollogne
57	R.FC.Hannutois	1-2	R.Aywaille FC.
58	R.FC.Huy	6-0	Sparta Walshoutem
59	SC.Petit-Waret	1-4	R.FC.Malmundaria 1904
60	R.CS.Jalhaytois	0-2	R.CS.Verlaine
61	Tenneville Sports	0-0 (4-5p)	R.ES.Champlonaise
62	R.Ent.Bertrigeoise	3-0	R.RC.Mormont
63	FC.Le Lorrain Arlon	2-0	R.Jeunesse Arlonaise
64	FC.Paliseulois	3-4	R.All.FC.Oppagne-Wéris
65	R.SC.Athusien	2-2 (5-6p)	ES.Vaux
66	FC.Montleban	0-5	FC.Bleid
67	US.Givry	10-1	K.FC.Olympia Recht
68	US.Martelangeoise	3-2	JS.Habaysienne
69	R.Arquet FC.	1-0	R.AC.Leuze-Longchamps
70	US.Beauraing 61	3-0	R.CS.Condruzien
71	R.Jeun.Aischoise	2-0	R.FC.Surice
72	Flavion Sport	1-3	Racing Jet Wavre
73	R.ES.Couvin-Mariembourg	2-2 (5-3p)	Ent.Sp.Fernelmont
74	R.W.Walhain CG.	4-1	J.Rochefortoise Jemelle A
75	La Jeun.Sportive Morialmé	1-1 (0-3p)	R.FC.Bioul 81
76	R.U.Wallonne Ciney	3-1	R.FC.Yvoir
77	R.SC.Templeuvois	1-4	F.Couillet-La Louvière
78	R.Gosselies Sports	1-0	Espoir Cl. Erpion
79	R.Jumet SC.	2-1	R.UFC.Ransartoise
80	FC.Rapid Symphorinois	0-3	JS.Taminoise
81	Heppig.-Lambusart-Fleurus	4-0	R.FC.De Gilly
82	R.US.Genly-Quevy 89	3-1	R.SC.Paturageois
83	FC.Bleharies	1-1 (4-2p)	Athl.CLub Le Roeulx
84	R.US.Beloeil	3-1	FC.Etoiles D'Ere-Allain

=== Round 2 ===
The matches were played on 2 August 2009.

Tie no	Home team	Score	Away team
85	K.BS.Poperinge	1-2	K.VK.Ieper
86	SK.Zingem	5-0	SV.Wevelgem City
87	Torhout 1992 km.	1-2	K.Sassport Boezinge
88	K.FC.Varsenare	1-4	K.SV.Diksmuide
89	K.Sint-Eloois-Winkel Sp.	2-0	K.SC.Blankenberge
90	K.Olsa Brakel	4-0	K.FC.Izegem
91	K.V.V. Koksijde	5-1	K.FC.Sparta Petegem
92	K.SK.Halle	0-2	Verbroedering Meldert
93	K.OVC.Sterrebeek	4-5	K.SK.L.Ternat
94	Korbeek Sport	0-8	K.Londerzeel SK.
95	K.Racing Club Bambrugge	3-3 (6-7p)	SK.St.P.Opwijk
96	Dilbeek Sport	2-1	K.FC.Eendr.Zele
97	K.Olympia SC.Wijgmaal	1-0	K.SC.Grimbergen
98	K.SV.Temse	0-0 (2-4p)	K.Berchem Sport 2004
99	Verbr.Geel-Meerhout	2-0	K.FC.St.-Lenaarts
100	KFC.Vrasene	2-1	K.FC.O.Wilrijk
101	K.FC.Duffel	9-1	K.V.Bonheiden
102	K.FC.Lille	0-0 (6-5p)	K.FC.De Kempen T.L.
103	K.FC.Katelijne-Waver	2-1	K.SV.Bornem
104	K.SK Heist	3-0	K.Lyra TSV.
105	K.SK.Hasselt	2-0	VV.Thes Sport Tessenderlo

Tie no	Home team	Score	Away team
106	K.VV.Heusden-Zolder	2-3	K.Patro Eisden Maasmech.
107	Spouwen-Mopertingen	0-0 (4-3p)	K.Lutlommel VV.
108	K.ESK.Leopoldsburg	2-2 (4-5p)	K.Vlijtingen VV.
109	K.Herk-De-Stad FC.	1-2	K.Esperanza Neerpelt
110	R.FC.Huy	3-0	RFC.Turkania Faymonville
111	ET.Elsautoise	1-0	Daring Club de Cointe
112	R.Aywaille FC.	1-2	R.Sprimont Comblain Sport
113	R.FC.Tilleur St.-Gilles	0-1	R.FC.Malmundaria 1904
114	Cité Sport Grace-Hollogne	2-2 (4-5p)	R.CS.Verlaine
115	US.Givry	5-1	R.ES.Champlonaise
116	US.Martelangeoise	0-2	R.Ent.Bertrigeoise
117	ES.Vaux	0-3	R.All.FC.Oppagne-Wéris
118	FC.Bleid	4-1	FC.Le Lorrain Arlon
119	R.Arquet FC.	0-2	R.U.Wallonne Ciney
120	R.W.Walhain CG.	3-2	US.Beauraing 61
121	Racing Jet Wavre	1-1 (6-5p)	R.ES.Couvin-Mariembourg
122	R.Jeun.Aischoise	1-2	R.FC.Bioul 81
123	R.US.Beloeil	3-3 (4-5p)	Heppig.-Lambusart-Fleurus
124	R.US.Genly-Quevy 89	0-1	F.Couillet-La Louvière
125	R.Gosselies Sports	1-5	JS.Taminoise
126	R.Jumet SC.	4-0	FC.Bleharies

=== Round 3 ===
The matches were played on 8 and 9 August 2009.

Tie no	Home team	Score	Away team
127	K.SK.Hasselt	1-1 (3-1p)	Exc. Veldwezelt
128	Spouwen-Mopertingen	2-1	K.Patro Eisden Maasmech.
129	K. Diegem Sport	1-1 (3-4p)	Dilbeek Sport
130	F.Couillet-La Louvière	1-0	R.U.Wallonne Ciney
131	R.FC.Bioul 81	0-3	S.C. Wielsbeke
132	K.V. Turnhout	1-0	K.Esperanza Neerpelt
133	Heppig.-Lambusart-Fleurus	0-1	White Star Woluwé F.C.
134	R.CS.Verlaine	0-5	K. Racing Waregem
135	R.Jumet SC.	1-6	R.W.Walhain CG.
136	R.All.FC.Oppagne-Wéris	0-7	K.F.C. Racing Mol-Wezel
137	Hoogstraten VV.	1-0	Racing Jet Wavre
138	R.FC.Malmundaria 1904	0-2	K. Rupel Boom F.C.
139	V.C. Eendracht Aalst 2002	3-1	US.Givry
140	K.S.V. Oudenaarde	6-2	ET.Elsautoise
141	K.SK Heist	0-3	K. Standaard Wetteren
142	K.V.C. Willebroek-Meerhof	3-2	R.Sprimont Comblain Sport
143	R.R.C. Hamoir	0-3	R.FC.Huy
144	K.S.V. Sottegem	1-2	R.Ent.Bertrigeoise
145	Verbr.Geel-Meerhout	0-1	K.F.C. Dessel Sport

Tie no	Home team	Score	Away team
146	F.C.N. Sint-Niklaas	4-0	K.Olympia SC.Wijgmaal
147	K.V.V. Koksijde	0-0 (3-4p)	R.F.C. Union La Calamine
148	K.Olsa Brakel	0-2	U.R.S. du Centre
149	K.Sassport Boezinge	2-2 (3-4p)	K.V. Woluwe-Zaventem
150	FC.Bleid	3-1	K.FC.Duffel
151	R.R.C. Peruwelz	0-1	Verbroedering Meldert
152	K.Sint-Eloois-Winkel Sp.	0-2	K. Bocholter V.V.
153	K.FC.Katelijne-Waver	2-1	R. Union Saint-Gilloise
154	KFC.Vrasene	2-3	K.S.K. Tongeren
155	K.SV.Diksmuide	0-1	R.C.S. Verviétois
156	SK.Zingem	0-4	R.R.C. Gent-Zeehaven
157	JS.Taminoise	1-2	K.FC.Lille
158	K.SK.L.Ternat	0-0 (4-2p)	Boussu Dour Borinage
159	K.Vlijtingen VV.	0-4	R.F.C. Sérésien
160	K.Londerzeel SK.	1-2	K.R.C. Mechelen
161	R. Cappellen F.C.	1-1 (3-5p)	K.Berchem Sport 2004
162	K.VK.Ieper	bye	
163	SK.St.P.Opwijk	0-4	C.S. Visé

=== Round 4 ===
The matches were played on 16 August 2009.

Team 1	Score	Team 2
K.VK.Ieper	1-1 (6-7p)	K.SK.Hasselt
K.S.K. Tongeren	3-1	K.FC.Katelijne-Waver
FC.Bleid	4-3 (aet)	R.R.C. Gent-Zeehaven
R.FC.Huy	2-0	K.V. Oostende
C.S. Visé	1-2	Verbroedering Meldert
K.M.S.K. Deinze	2-0	R.W.Walhain CG.
K. Standaard Wetteren	4-2	K.V. Red Star Waasland
K.V.S.K. United Overpelt-Lommel	1-0 (aet)	K.F.C. Racing Mol-Wezel
Royal Antwerp FC	1-0	K.V. Turnhout
K.V.C. Willebroek-Meerhof	1-4	K. Rupel Boom F.C.
FC Molenbeek Brussels Strombeek	0-2	White Star Woluwé F.C.
R.F.C. Union La Calamine	0-2	R.E. Virton
Hoogstraten VV.	2-1	K.A.S. Eupen
K.F.C. Dessel Sport	1-1 (5-3p)	R.O.C. de Charleroi-Marchienne
K. Sint-Truidense V.V.	5-0	K.Berchem Sport 2004
K.F.C. V.W. Hamme	3-1 (aet)	F.C.N. Sint-Niklaas
K.S.V. Oudenaarde	3-2	R.F.C. Tournai
V.C. Eendracht Aalst 2002	1-1 (4-3p)	UR Namur
K.S.K. Ronse	4-3	K. Bocholter V.V.
K.S.K. Beveren	4-1	Dilbeek Sport
U.R.S. du Centre	4-0	R.F.C. Sérésien
Spouwen-Mopertingen	2-1	R.F.C. de Liège
K. Lierse S.K.	5-1	F.Couillet-La Louvière
K. Racing Waregem	2-3 (aet)	Oud-Heverlee Leuven
K.R.C. Mechelen	0-1	K.V. Woluwe-Zaventem
R.C.S. Verviétois	3-2 (aet)	K.FC.Lille
K.V.K. Tienen	1-4	R.Ent.Bertrigeoise
S.C. Wielsbeke	2-0	K.SK.L.Ternat

=== Round 5 ===
The matches were played on 23 August 2009.

Team 1	Score	Team 2
K. Lierse S.K.	2-1	R.FC.Huy
Royal Antwerp FC	1-0	FC.Bleid
K. Rupel Boom F.C.	0-4	K.S.K. Beveren
K.S.K. Ronse	3-0	K.S.V. Oudenaarde
K.F.C. Dessel Sport	2-5	Oud-Heverlee Leuven
K.F.C. V.W. Hamme	1-0	Hoogstraten VV.
K. Standaard Wetteren	4-2	K.SK.Hasselt
Verbroedering Meldert	0-1	R.C.S. Verviétois
K. Sint-Truidense V.V.	1-0	K.V. Woluwe-Zaventem
V.C. Eendracht Aalst 2002	2-0	K.V.S.K. United Overpelt-Lommel
U.R.S. du Centre	0-1	K.M.S.K. Deinze
S.C. Wielsbeke	0-2	Spouwen-Mopertingen
K.S.K. Tongeren	0-1	R.E. Virton
R.Ent.Bertrigeoise	1-2	White Star Woluwé F.C.

== Final Stages ==
=== Bracket ===
Round 6
Wetteren	1
Charleroi (aet)	2
KV Mechelen	2
Spouwen-Mopertingen	0
Westerlo (aet)	3
Aalst	2
Mons (aet)	2
Mouscron	1
Club Brugge	5
Hamme	0
Lokeren	2
Tubize	0
Gent	3
Woluwe	1
Germinal Beerschot	3
Deinze	0
Anderlecht	2
Verviers	0
Antwerp	0
Dender	1
Zulte Waregem	3
Ronse	0
Cercle Brugge	2
OH Leuven	0
Standard Liège (aet)	2
Lierse	1
Virton	0
Kortrijk (aet)	1
Sint-Truiden	0
Genk	1
Roeselare (aet)	2
Beveren	1

Round 7
Charleroi	2
KV Mechelen (aet)	5
Westerlo	3
Mons	1
Club Brugge	2
Lokeren	1
Gent	1
Germinal Beerschot	0
Anderlecht	3
Dender	0
Zulte Waregem	1
Cercle Brugge	3
Standard Liège	1
Kortrijk	2
Genk	1
Roeselare	2

Quarter-finals
KV Mechelen	3	0	3
Westerlo	2	0	2
Club Brugge	1	0	1
Gent	4	1	5
Anderlecht	2	0	2
Cercle Brugge (a)	1	1	2
Kortrijk	3	0	3
Roeselare (a)	2	1	3

Semi-finals
KV Mechelen	2	0	2
Gent	2	1	3
Cercle Brugge	3	1	4
Roeselare	0	3	3

Final
Gent	3
Cercle Brugge	0

=== Round 6 ===
The matches were played on 27 and 28 October 2009. All 16 Belgian First Division teams were supposed to enter in this round, however newly promoted Sint-Truiden had to start already in round 4 due to an error by the KBVB-URBSFA. The three teams relegated last season from the top division were also allowed to enter in this round. The top 16 teams of the Belgian First Division 2008–09 are seeded in this round and cannot meet each other. This means that newly promoted Sint-Truiden was not seeded, whereas relegated Dender is.

The draw was made on 2 September 2009.

28 October 2009	Virton	0–1 (a.e.t.)	Kortrijk	Virton
20:30 CET			Pavlović 95'	Stadium: Stade Yvan Georges

28 October 2009	Westerlo	3–2 (a.e.t.)	Aalst	Westerlo
20:30 CET	Dekelver 43', 120+1' de Petter 49' (pen.)		Podevijn 2'; Lord 32' (pen.)	Stadium: Het Kuipje

28 October 2009	Club Brugge	5–0	Hamme	Bruges
20:00 CET	Geraerts 23'; Van der Heyden 39' (o.g.); Dahmane 69' (pen.); Meeus 70'; Chávez 87'			Stadium: Jan Breydel Stadium

28 October 2009	Wetteren	1–2 (a.e.t.)	Charleroi	Wetteren
20:30 CET	Claessens 113'		Cordaro 91'; Habibou 108'	Stadium: Marcel De Kerpelstadion

28 October 2009	Antwerp	0–1	Dender	Antwerp
20:30 CET			Ngolok 13'	Stadium: Bosuilstadion

28 October 2009	Anderlecht	2–0	Verviers	Brussels
20:30 CET	Spinosa 27' (o.g.); Frutos 47'			Stadium: Constant Vanden Stock Stadium

28 October 2009	Lokeren	2–0	Tubize	Lokeren
20:30 CET	Šokota 65'; El Mouataz 80' (pen.)			Stadium: Daknamstadion

27 October 2009	Sint-Truiden	0–1	Genk	Sint-Truiden
20:45 CET			Ogunjimi 5'	Stadium: Staaienveld

27 October 2009	Mons	2–1 (a.e.t.)	Mouscron	Mons
20:30 CET	Sankaré 85'; Roussel 93'		François 61'	Stadium: Stade Charles Tondreau

28 October 2009	Roeselare	2–1 (a.e.t.)	Beveren	Roeselare
20:30 CET	de Pever 78'; Dissa 107'		Martens 8'	Stadium: Schiervelde Stadion

28 October 2009	Mechelen	2–0	Spouwen-Mopertingen	Mechelen
20:30 CET	Nong 80'; Rossini 90+2'			Stadium: Argosstadion Achter de Kazerne

28 October 2009	Gent	3–1	Woluwe	Ghent
20:00 CET	Marić 42'; Biot 85' (o.g.); Coulibaly 90+5'		Amoah 75'	Stadium: Jules Ottenstadion

27 October 2009	Standard Liège	2–1 (a.e.t.)	Lierse	Liège
20:00 CET	Nicaise 11'; Dufer 112' (pen.)		Samir 80'	Stadium: Stade Maurice Dufrasne

28 October 2009	Zulte-Waregem	3–0	Ronse	Waregem
20:30 CET	D'Haene 51'; Ernemann 66'; Chevalier 85'			Stadium: Regenboogstadion

27 October 2009	Germinal Beerschot	3–0	Deinze	Antwerp
20:00 CET	MacDonald 26'; Dosunmu 49'; De Man 56'			Stadium: Olympisch Stadion

27 October 2009	Cercle Brugge	2–0	OH Leuven	Bruges
20:30 CET	Božović 25', 32'			Stadium: Jan Breydel Stadium

=== Round 7 ===
The draw for the seventh round and the quarter finals was made on 4 November 2009. The match between Gent and Germinal Beerschot was originally scheduled one day earlier than the other matches for television broadcasting, but due to snow, the match was rescheduled to also be played on 23 December 2009. One day after this match had been rescheduled, the match between Zulte-Waregem and Cercle Brugge was postponed for the same reason. This match was originally scheduled to be played on 13 January 2010, but was postponed again to 14 January. On 14 January 2010 it was postponed a third time, which proved problematic as the ongoing bad weather had caused the calendar of most teams to be completely full. The next round of the cup was to be played on Wednesday 20 January and with league matches planned during the weekend a creative solution was necessary. This solution came from the Belgian FA who decided on their own to schedule the game on 20 January, with the two-legged quarter final, which was supposed to be played on this date and 27 January, becoming a single leg match. The winner of the rescheduled match was to play Anderlecht on 27 January, in Anderlecht. This decision was much discussed as it was against the rules of the Belgian Cup. After Cercle Brugge and Zulte-Waregem had discussed the case, they decided not to protest against the decision.

23 December 2009	Club Brugge	2–1	Lokeren	Bruges
20:00 CET	Kouemaha 47'; Vargas 81'		Mbayo 90'	Stadium: Jan Breydel Stadium

23 December 2009	Charleroi	2–5 (a.e.t.)	Mechelen	Charleroi
20:30 CET	Habibou 35'; Guedioura 78'		Kéré 7' (o.g.); Geudens 48' van Hoevelen 104'; Mununga 108'; Ghomsi 111'	Stadium: Stade du Pays de Charleroi

23 December 2009	Genk	1–2	Roeselare	Genk
20:30 CET	João Carlos 50'		El Gaaouiri 16', 63'	Stadium: Cristal Arena

23 December 2009	Anderlecht	3–0	Dender	Brussels
20:30 CET	De Sutter 6', 90'; Biglia 9'			Stadium: Constant Vanden Stock Stadium

23 December 2009	Westerlo	3–1	Mons	Westerlo
20:30 CET	Odita 36'; Dekelver 77'; Tomou 89'		Roussel 2'	Stadium: Het Kuipje

23 December 2009	Standard Liège	1–2	Kortrijk	Liège
20:30 CET	Witsel 80'		Capon 30'; Benteke 33'	Stadium: Stade Maurice Dufrasne

23 December 2009	Gent	1–0	Germinal Beerschot	Ghent
21:00 CET	Wils 88'			Stadium: Jules Ottenstadion

20 January 2010	Zulte-Waregem	1–3	Cercle Brugge	Waregem
20:30 CET	Roelandts 65' (pen.)		Van Eenoo 28'; Foley 39', 90+1'	Stadium: Regenboogstadion

=== Quarter-finals ===
With the match between Zulte-Waregem and Cercle Brugge postponed three times and not many options remaining, the decision was made by the Belgian Football Association to play the Anderlecht versus Cercle Brugge in just one leg instead of two, with that match being played at Anderlecht. Cercle Brugge protested, insisting that the Belgian Football Association make the rules equal for all teams or they would take the Belgian FA to court. Thus either all matches in the quarter finals were played over one leg or all over two legs, not something in between. With the first legs of the other quarter finals already played, the Belgian FA decided to indeed change the matchup yet again and make the Anderlecht vs. Cercle Brugge match two legs after all.

==== First legs ====
20 January 2010	Kortrijk	3–2	Roeselare	Kortrijk
20:30 CET	Benteke 47'; De Beule 64'; Ibou 74'		Dissa 75'; Tomou 88'	Stadium: Guldensporen Stadion

20 January 2010	Mechelen	3–2	Westerlo	Mechelen
20:30 CET	Mununga 18'; Gorius 20', 65' (pen.)		Dekelver 16'; Yakovenko 45+1'	Stadium: Argosstadion Achter de Kazerne

20 January 2010	Club Brugge	1–4	Gent	Bruges
20:45 CET	Akpala 16'		Čustović 50', 72'; Leye 58'; Smolders 84'	Stadium: Jan Breydel Stadium

23 January 2010	Anderlecht	2–1	Cercle Brugge	Brussels
20:00 CET	Boussoufa 3' (pen.); Kouyaté 78'		Božović 64'	Stadium: Constant Vanden Stock Stadium

==== Second legs ====
26 January 2010	Cercle Brugge	1–0 (2a–2 agg.)	Anderlecht	Bruges
20:30 CET	Božović 8'			Stadium: Jan Breydel Stadium

27 January 2010	Roeselare	1–0 (3a–3 agg.)	Kortrijk	Roeselare
20:30 CET	Dequevy 83'			Stadium: Schiervelde Stadion

27 January 2010	Gent	1–0 (5–1 agg.)	Club Brugge	Ghent
20:30 CET	Pieroni 44'			Stadium: Jules Ottenstadion

27 January 2010	Westerlo	0–0 (2–3 agg.)	Mechelen	Westerlo
20:45 CET				Stadium: Het Kuipje

=== Semi-finals ===
The semi finals are also two-legged. The draw was made on 1 February 2010.

==== First legs ====
9 February 2010	Mechelen	2–2	Gent	Mechelen
20:45 CET	Geudens 36'; Biset 47'		Ljubijankić 9'; Coulibaly 65'	Stadium: Argosstadion Achter de Kazerne

17 March 2010	Cercle Brugge	3–0	Roeselare	Bruges
20:45 CET	Vossen 29'; Cornelis 36'; Iachtchouk 72'			Stadium: Jan Breydel Stadium

==== Second legs ====
25 March 2010	Gent	1–0 (3–2 agg.)	Mechelen	Ghent
20:45 CET	Coulibaly 38'			Stadium: Jules Ottenstadion

26 March 2010	Roeselare	3–1 (4–3 agg.)	Cercle Brugge	Roeselare
20:45 CET	Dissa 37'; Huyghebaert 58'; Kelhar 72' (o.g.)		Vossen 4' (pen.)	Stadium: Schiervelde Stadion

=== Final ===
15 May 2010
20:45 CET

Gent	3–0	Cercle Brugge
Coulibaly 35'; Leye 85'; Grondin 90+3'

King Baudouin Stadium, Brussels
Attendance: 50,000
Referee: Paul Allaerts

== See also ==
- Belgian First Division 2009–10
