= Maël Lépicier =

Footballer (born 1986)

Personal information
- Full name: Maël Lépicier Tsonga
- Date of birth: 14 January 1986 (age 40)
- Place of birth: Le Mans, France
- Height: 1.83 m (6 ft 0 in)
- Position: Centre-back

Youth career
- 2005–2006: Le Mans
- 2006–2007: Châtellerault
- 2007–2008: Martigues

Senior career*
| Years | Team | Apps | (Gls) |
| 2008–2009 | Virton | 31 | (0) |
| 2009–2012 | Mons | 91 | (5) |
| 2013–2014 | Beerschot | 5 | (0) |
| 2014–2015 | Royal Antwerp | 16 | (0) |
| 2015–2019 | KSV Roeselare | 61 | (4) |
| 2019–? | RJ Rochefort | | |
| Total | | 203 | (9) |

International career
| 2011–2016 | Republic of the Congo | 20 | (0) |
- * Club domestic league appearances and goals

Maël Lépicier (born 14 January 1986) is a former professional footballer who played for as a centre-back. Born in France, he made 20 appearances for the Republic of the Congo national team between 2011 and 2016.

== Career ==
On 1 October 2019, Lépicier signed with Royale Jeunesse Rochefort FC.

== Personal life ==
Lépicier is the cousin of the French tennis player Jo-Wilfried Tsonga.
