= Elimane Coulibaly =

Senegalese footballer

Personal information
- Date of birth: 5 March 1980 (age 46)
- Place of birth: Yembeul, Senegal
- Height: 1.90 m (6 ft 3 in)
- Position: Forward

Team information
- Current team: KRC Gent (Manager)

Youth career
- 1986–1998: Yaakaar Dakar

Senior career*
Years	Team	Apps	(Gls)
2003–2004	Oostakker		
2004–2005	Ninove		
2005–2007	Deinze	37	(15)
2007–2009	Kortrijk	58	(18)
2009–2012	Gent	68	(22)
2012	Beerschot	11	(3)
2012–2014	Gent	3	(0)
2013–2014	→ Kortrijk (loan)	24	(9)
2014–2016	Oostende	29	(7)
2016	Mouscron-Péruwelz	9	(1)
2017	KVK Westhoek		
2017–2018	Oudenaarde	28	(9)
2018–2019	KM Torhout		

Managerial career
- 2019–2020: Jong Gent (forward coach)
- 2020–2023: Jong Gent (assistant)
- 2023–: KRC Gent
- * Club domestic league appearances and goals

Elimane Coulibaly (born 15 March 1980 in Dakar) is a Senegalese retired professional footballer who played as a forward and current manager of KRC Gent.

== Club career ==
=== First years ===
Having emigrated from Senegal to Belgium, Coulibaly first started playing football in the local teams of KFC Oostakker and KVK Ninove. At the start of the 2005–06 season, Coulibaly left KVK Ninove for KMSK Deinze, which played in the Second Division, where he scored 15 times in 36 games over two seasons.

=== KV Kortrijk ===
At the end of the 2005–06 season, Coulibaly joined the West-Flemish fellow Second Division team KV Kortrijk on a two-year contract. In his first season, he managed five goals in 27 games while his club was promoted to the Belgian Pro League. The season 2008–2009 became the breakthrough of Coulibaly: thanks to his 11 goals, Kortrijk managed to avoid relegation from the Pro League.

=== AA Gent ===
In summer 2009, Coulibaly signed a three-year contract with AA Gent. Following a slow start to the 2009–2010 season with few appearances he got his first goal versus Mechelen before going on to score 11 goals for the season and thus greatly contributing to AA Gent's vice-championship. Coulibaly also scored the first goal in the cup final as his club beat Cercle Brugge to win the 2009–10 Belgian Cup.

Coulibaly's second season in Ghent was less spectacular than his first. He scored AA Gent's first ever goal in Champions League qualification as his team lost 6–1 on aggregate to Dynamo Kyiv in the third qualifying round for the 2010–2011 Champions League and helped AA Gent make the group phase of the Europa League by scoring in their return leg against Feyenoord in the playoff round, but later lost his place in the starting lineup to new arrival Shlomi Arbeitman.

=== Beerschot AC ===
Having been released by Gent Coulibaly joined Beerschot A.C. in July 2012. However, on 24 October 2012, he was released by the club for aggressive behavior towards his teammate Hernán Losada. Coulibaly clashed with Losada after their team's 3–0 defeat by KRC Genk on 20 October 2012.

=== Return to AA Gent ===
Free agent Coulibaly was signed by Gent in December 2012.

== Coaching career ==
After hanging up his boots, Coulibaly began his coaching career, starting as an attack coach at KAA Gent with the club's U23/Jong team and later, from the 2020–21 season, as assistant coach.

Ahead of the 2023–24 season, Coulibaly was appointed manager of K.R.C. Gent.

== Honours ==
K.A.A. Gent

- Belgian Cup (1): 2009–10
