= List of Belgian football transfers winter 2010–11 =

This is a list of Belgian football transfers for the 2010-11 winter transfer window. Only transfers involving a team from the Jupiler League are listed.

The winter transfer window opens on 1 January 2011, although a few transfers may take place prior to that date. The window closes at midnight on 1 February 2011. Players without a club may join one, either during or in between transfer windows.

== Sorted by date ==
=== September 2010 ===
Date	Name	Moving from	Moving to	Fee
September 7, 2010	(Belgium) Anthony Vanden Borre	(Italy) Genoa	(Belgium) Genk	Undisclosed

=== October 2010 ===
Date	Name	Moving from	Moving to	Fee
October 13, 2010	(Belgium) Grégory Dufer	(Belgium) Standard Liège	(Belgium) Sint-Truiden	Undisclosed

=== November 2010 ===
Date	Name	Moving from	Moving to	Fee
November 8, 2010	(Croatia) Leon Benko	(Belgium) Kortrijk	Free agent	Released
November 14, 2010	(Nigeria) Kennedy Nwanganga	(Finland) Inter Turku	(Belgium) Genk	Undisclosed
November 15, 2010	(Egypt) Sherif Fayed	(Egypt) Wadi Degla	(Belgium) Lierse	Undisclosed
November 21, 2010	(Belgium) Frédéric Dupré	(Belgium) Lokeren	Free agent	Released
November 21, 2010	(Iceland) Alfreð Finnbogason	(Iceland) Breiðablik	(Belgium) Lokeren	Undisclosed
November 27, 2010	(Norway) Alexander Mathisen	(Norway) Aalesund	(Belgium) Lierse	Free
November 29, 2010	(Belgium) Jelle Van Damme	(England) Wolverhampton	(Belgium) Standard Liège	Undisclosed
November 30, 2010	(Sweden) Marcus Andreasson	(Norway) Molde	(Belgium) Lierse	Undisclosed

=== December 2010 ===
Date	Name	Moving from	Moving to	Fee
December 1, 2010	(Belgium) Christophe Grégoire	Unattached	(Belgium) Charleroi	Free
December 3, 2010	(Finland) Roni Porokara	(Sweden) Örebro	(Belgium) Germinal Beerschot	Undisclosed
December 9, 2010	(Ivory Coast) Mohamed Koné	(Thailand) Muangthong United	(Belgium) Mechelen	Undisclosed
December 11, 2010	(Denmark) Jesper Jørgensen	(Denmark) Esbjerg	(Belgium) Gent	Undisclosed
December 15, 2010	(Serbia) Dalibor Veselinović	(Belgium) Brussels	(Belgium) Anderlecht	Undisclosed
December 16, 2010	(Serbia) Miloš Marić	(Germany) VfL Bochum	(Belgium) Lierse	Undisclosed
December 17, 2010	(France) Franck Signorino	Unattached	(Belgium) Charleroi	Free
December 20, 2010	(Senegal) Papa Sene	(Belgium) Coxyde	(Belgium) Cercle Brugge	Undisclosed
December 22, 2010	(France) Chris Mavinga	(England) Liverpool	(Belgium) Genk	Loan
December 24, 2010	(Brazil) Renan Boufleur	(Belgium) Anderlecht	(Belgium) Union	Loan
December 24, 2010	(Belgium) Olivier Mukendi	(Belgium) Cercle Brugge	(Belgium) Anderlecht	Loan return
December 24, 2010	(Belgium) Olivier Mukendi	(Belgium) Anderlecht	(Belgium) Union	Loan
December 28, 2010	(Montenegro) Milan Purović	(Portugal) Sporting	(Belgium) Cercle Brugge	Loan
December 30, 2010	(Senegal) Alpha Ba	(Senegal) Ouakam	(Belgium) Gent	Undisclosed

=== End of 2010 ===
Some players were on a loan which ended in 2010. As of 1 January 2011, they returned to their original club and are listed here. For a list of players on loan during the last year, see List of Belgian football transfers winter 2009–10 and summer 2010.

Date	Name	Moving from	Moving to	Fee
End of 2010	(Argentina) Pier Barrios	(Belgium) Anderlecht	(Argentina) Belgrano	Loan return
End of 2010	(Senegal) Pape Abdou Camara	(Belgium) Sint-Truiden	(Belgium) Standard Liège	Loan return

=== January 2011 ===
Date	Name	Moving from	Moving to	Fee
January 3, 2011	(Senegal) Abdoulaye Seck	(Senegal) Niarry Tally	(Belgium) Anderlecht	Undisclosed
January 4, 2011	(Belgium) Jérémy Huyghebaert	(France) Auxerre	(Belgium) Mechelen	Free
January 4, 2011	(Belgium) Timothy Dreesen	(Belgium) Lierse	(Belgium) Turnhout	Loan
January 5, 2011	(Israel) Dudu Biton	(Israel) Hapoel Petah Tikva	(Belgium) Charleroi	Undisclosed
January 5, 2011	(Senegal) Zakaria Gueye	(Belgium) Zulte Waregem	(France) Fréjus	Loan
January 5, 2011	(France) Jérémy Perbet	(Belgium) Lokeren	(Belgium) Mons	Loan
January 5, 2011	(Argentina) Juan Pablo Rial	(Argentina) Platense	(Belgium) Charleroi	Undisclosed
January 6, 2011	(Israel) Tamir Cahlon	(Israel) Maccabi Tel Aviv	(Belgium) Charleroi	Undisclosed
January 6, 2011	(Belgium) Joachim Mununga	(Belgium) Mechelen	(Turkey) Gençlerbirliği	Undisclosed
January 6, 2011	(North Macedonia) Nderim Nedzipi	(Belgium) Lierse	Free agent	Released
January 7, 2011	(Costa Rica) Randall Azofeifa	(Belgium) Gent	(Turkey) Gençlerbirliği	Undisclosed
January 7, 2011	(France) Cédric Bétrémieux	(Belgium) Kortrijk	(Belgium) Mouscron Peruwelz	Loan
January 7, 2011	(Norway) Vegard Braaten	(Belgium) Lokeren	(Norway) Alta	Loan
January 7, 2011	(Belgium) Evariste Ngolok	(Belgium) Dender	(Belgium) Westerlo	Undisclosed
January 8, 2011	(Belgium) Kevin Janssens	(Belgium) Lierse	(Belgium) Turnhout	Loan
January 9, 2011	(Iceland) Árni Gautur Arason	Unattached	(Belgium) Lierse	Free
January 9, 2011	(Belgium) Garry De Graef	(Belgium) Lierse	(Belgium) Turnhout	Undisclosed
January 10, 2011	(Slovenia) Elvedin Džinič	(Slovenia) Maribor	(Belgium) Charleroi	Undisclosed
January 10, 2011	(France) Rudy Riou	(France) Marseille	(Belgium) Charleroi	Undisclosed
January 11, 2011	(France) Grégory Christ	(Belgium) Sint-Truiden	(Greece) Panthrakikos	Loan
January 11, 2011	(Israel) Matan Ohayon	(Israel) Ashdod	(Belgium) Charleroi	Undisclosed
January 11, 2011	(Gabon) John Tshibumbu	(Belgium) Charleroi	(Belgium) Tubize	Loan
January 12, 2011	(Belgium) Rubin Dantschotter	(Belgium) Cercle Brugge	(Belgium) Oostende	Loan
January 12, 2011	(Belgium) Benoit Masset	(Belgium) Sint-Truiden	(Belgium) Grimbergen	Loan
January 12, 2011	(Serbia) Jovan Stojanović	(Belgium) Cercle Brugge	(Belgium) Roeselare	Loan
January 12, 2011	(Belgium) Jeroen Vanthournout	(Belgium) Roeselare	(Belgium) Westerlo	Undisclosed
January 13, 2011	(Brazil) Orlando	(Belgium) Charleroi	(Greece) Panthrakikos	Undisclosed
January 14, 2011	(Democratic Republic of the Congo) Junior Kabananga	(Belgium) Anderlecht	(Belgium) Germinal Beerschot	Loan
January 15, 2011	(Belgium) Tom Caluwé	(Belgium) Sint-Truiden	Free agent	Released
January 16, 2011	(Ghana) Ibrahim Ayew	(Egypt) Zamalek	(Belgium) Lierse	Undisclosed
January 16, 2011	(Guadeloupe) Cédric Collet	(Belgium) Standard Liège	Free agent	Released
January 17, 2011	(France) Mohamed Dahmane	(Turkey) Bucaspor	(Belgium) Eupen	Free
January 19, 2011	(Belgium) Alessio Baglio	(Belgium) Charleroi	(Belgium) Tubize	Loan
January 19, 2011	(Democratic Republic of the Congo) Eric Bokanga	(Belgium) Standard Liège	Free agent	Released
January 21, 2011	(Spain) César Arzo	(Spain) Valladolid	(Belgium) Gent	Undisclosed
January 21, 2011	(Spain) Javier Martos	(Spain) Eibar	(Belgium) Charleroi	Undisclosed
January 21, 2011	(Cameroon) Sébastien Siani	(Belgium) Anderlecht	(Belgium) Brussels	Loan
January 22, 2011	(Morocco) Abdelfettah Boukhriss	(Morocco) FUS Rabat	(Belgium) Standard Liège	Undisclosed
January 22, 2011	(France) Benjamin Nicaise	(Belgium) Lierse	(Greece) Panthrakikos	Loan
January 25, 2011	(Belgium) Bram Castro	Unattached	(Belgium) Sint-Truiden	Free
January 25, 2011	(Serbia) Nemanja Džodžo	(Serbia) Borča	(Belgium) Charleroi	Undisclosed
January 25, 2011	(Brazil) Kanu	(Portugal) Beira-Mar	(Belgium) Standard Liège	Undisclosed
January 25, 2011	(Rwanda) Henri Munyaneza	(Belgium) Germinal Beerschot	Free agent	Released
January 26, 2011	(Honduras) Víctor Bernárdez	(Belgium) Anderlecht	(Belgium) Lierse	Loan
January 26, 2011	(Belgium) Soufiane Bidaoui	(Belgium) Westerlo	(Belgium) Roeselare	Loan
January 26, 2011	(Belgium) Leroy Labylle	(Belgium) Genk	(Belgium) Standard Liège	Undisclosed
January 27, 2011	(Belgium) Tjendo De Cuyper	(Belgium) Club Brugge Under-23	(Belgium) Club Brugge	Free
January 27, 2011	(Belgium) Jimmy De Jonghe	(Belgium) Club Brugge Under-23	(Belgium) Club Brugge	Free
January 27, 2011	(Belgium) Fries Deschilder	(Belgium) Club Brugge Under-23	(Belgium) Club Brugge	Free
January 27, 2011	(Belgium) Christian Kabasele	(Belgium) Eupen	(Belgium) Mechelen	Loan
January 27, 2011	(The Gambia) Ibou Savaneh	(Belgium) Kortrijk	(Belgium) Mechelen	Loan
January 28, 2011	(Argentina) Pablo Chavarría	(Belgium) Anderlecht	(Belgium) Eupen	Loan
January 28, 2011	(Burkina Faso) Pierre Koulibaly	(Libya) Al-Ittihad	(Belgium) Mechelen	Free
January 28, 2011	(Morocco) Ibrahim Maaroufi	(Morocco) Wydad Casablanca	(Belgium) Eupen	Undisclosed
January 28, 2011	(Belgium) Ilombe Mboyo	(Belgium) Kortrijk	(Belgium) Gent	Undisclosed
January 28, 2011	(Belgium) Kenny Thompson	(Belgium) Gent	(Belgium) Lierse	Undisclosed
January 29, 2011	(Brazil) João Carlos	(Belgium) Genk	(Russia) Anzhi Makhachkala	Undisclosed
January 31, 2011	(Israel) Hatem Abd Elhamed	(Israel) Maccabi Tel Aviv	(Belgium) Charleroi	Loan
January 31, 2011	(Belgium) Mark De Man	(Belgium) Germinal Beerschot	(Belgium) OH Leuven	Loan
January 31, 2011	(Nigeria) Manasseh Ishiaku	(Germany) 1. FC Köln	(Belgium) Sint-Truiden	Loan
January 31, 2011	(Serbia) Vladan Kujović	(Belgium) Lierse	Free agent	Released
January 31, 2011	(Ghana) Abraham Kudemor	(Montenegro) Budućnost Podgorica	(Belgium) Charleroi	Undisclosed
January 31, 2011	(Czech Republic) Jan Polák	(Belgium) Anderlecht	(Germany) VfL Wolfsburg	Undisclosed
January 31, 2011	(Serbia) Nemanja Rnić	(Belgium) Anderlecht	(Belgium) Germinal Beerschot	Loan
January 31, 2011	(Serbia) Stefan Šćepović	(Belgium) Club Brugge	(Belgium) Kortrijk	Loan
January 31, 2011	(France) Julien Tournut	(Belgium) Lierse	(Belgium) Waasland-Beveren	Undisclosed
January 31, 2011	(Belgium) Kurt Van Dooren	(Belgium) Lierse	(Belgium) Heist	Undisclosed

=== February 2011 ===
Date	Name	Moving from	Moving to	Fee
February 1, 2011	(Belgium) Gregory Mertens	(Belgium) Gent	(Belgium) Cercle Brugge	Undisclosed
February 1, 2011	(Brazil) Nadson	(Moldova) Sheriff Tiraspol	(Belgium) Genk	Loan

== Sorted by team ==
=== Anderlecht ===
In:

No.	Pos.	Nation	Player
6	DF	SEN	Abdoulaye Seck (from (Senegal) Niarry Tally)
87	FW	SRB	Dalibor Veselinović (from (Belgium) Brussels)
—	MF	BEL	Olivier Mukendi (loan return from (Belgium) Cercle Brugge)

Out:

No.	Pos.	Nation	Player
6	DF	ARG	Pier Barrios (loan return to (Argentina) Belgrano)
8	MF	CZE	Jan Polák (to (Germany) VfL Wolfsburg)
25	FW	ARG	Pablo Chavarría (on loan to (Belgium) Eupen)
26	DF	HON	Víctor Bernárdez (on loan to (Belgium) Lierse)
44	DF	SRB	Nemanja Rnić (on loan to (Belgium) Germinal Beerschot)
—	DF	BRA	Renan Boufleur (on loan to (Belgium) Union)
—	FW	COD	Junior Kabananga (on loan to (Belgium) Germinal Beerschot)
—	MF	BEL	Olivier Mukendi (on loan to (Belgium) Union)
—	FW	CMR	Sébastien Siani (on loan to (Belgium) Brussels)

=== Cercle Brugge ===
In:

No.	Pos.	Nation	Player
—	DF	BEL	Gregory Mertens (from (Belgium) Gent)
—	FW	MNE	Milan Purović (on loan from (Portugal) Sporting)
—	MF	SEN	Papa Sene (from (Belgium) Coxyde)

Out:

No.	Pos.	Nation	Player
1	GK	BEL	Rubin Dantschotter (on loan to (Belgium) Oostende)
—	MF	BEL	Olivier Mukendi (loan return to (Belgium) Anderlecht)
—	MF	SRB	Jovan Stojanović (on loan to (Belgium) Roeselare)

=== Charleroi ===
In:

No.	Pos.	Nation	Player
—	FW	ISR	Hatem Abd Elhamed (on loan from (Israel) Maccabi Tel Aviv)
—	FW	ISR	Dudu Biton (from (Israel) Hapoel Petah Tikva)
—	MF	ISR	Tamir Cahlon (from (Israel) Maccabi Tel Aviv)
—	DF	SVN	Elvedin Džinič (from (Slovenia) Maribor)
—	DF	SRB	Nemanja Džodžo (from (Serbia) Borča)
—	MF	BEL	Christophe Grégoire (unattached)
—	DF	GHA	Abraham Kudemor (from (Montenegro) Budućnost Podgorica)
—	MF	ESP	Javier Martos (from (Spain) Eibar)
—	DF	ISR	Matan Ohayon (from (Israel) Ashdod)
—	FW	ARG	Juan Pablo Rial (from (Argentina) Platense)
—	GK	FRA	Rudy Riou (from (France) Marseille)
—	DF	FRA	Franck Signorino (unattached)

Out:

No.	Pos.	Nation	Player
22	FW	BRA	Orlando (to (Greece) Panthrakikos)
—	DF	BEL	Alessio Baglio (on loan to (Belgium) Tubize)
—	DF	GAB	John Tshibumbu (on loan to (Belgium) Tubize)

=== Club Brugge ===
In:

No.	Pos.	Nation	Player
—	MF	BEL	Tjendo De Cuyper (promoted from youth squad)
—	DF	BEL	Jimmy De Jonghe (promoted from youth squad)
—	DF	BEL	Fries Deschilder (promoted from youth squad)

Out:

No.	Pos.	Nation	Player
8	FW	SRB	Stefan Šćepović (on loan to (Belgium) Kortrijk)

=== Eupen ===
In:

No.	Pos.	Nation	Player
77	FW	FRA	Mohamed Dahmane (from (Turkey) Bucaspor)
—	FW	ARG	Pablo Chavarría (on loan from (Belgium) Anderlecht)
—	FW	MAR	Ibrahim Maaroufi (from (Morocco) Wydad Casablanca)

Out:

No.	Pos.	Nation	Player
—	FW	BEL	Christian Kabasele (on loan to (Belgium) Mechelen)

=== Genk ===
In:

No.	Pos.	Nation	Player
11	MF	BEL	Anthony Vanden Borre (from (Italy) Genoa)
27	FW	NGA	Kennedy Nwanganga (from (Finland) Inter Turku)
—	DF	FRA	Chris Mavinga (on loan from (England) Liverpool)
—	DF	BRA	Nadson (on loan from (Moldova) Sheriff Tiraspol)

Out:

No.	Pos.	Nation	Player
30	DF	BRA	João Carlos (to (Russia) Anzhi Makhachkala)
—	MF	BEL	Leroy Labylle (to (Belgium) Standard Liège)

=== Gent ===
In:

No.	Pos.	Nation	Player
—	DF	ESP	César Arzo (from (Spain) Valladolid)
—	DF	SEN	Alpha Ba (from (Senegal) Ouakam)
—	DF	DEN	Jesper Jørgensen (from (Denmark) Esbjerg)
—	FW	BEL	Ilombe Mboyo (from (Belgium) Kortrijk)

Out:

No.	Pos.	Nation	Player
10	MF	CRC	Randall Azofeifa (to (Turkey) Gençlerbirliği)
12	DF	BEL	Kenny Thompson (to (Belgium) Lierse)
18	DF	BEL	Gregory Mertens (to Cercle Brugge)

=== Germinal Beerschot ===
In:

No.	Pos.	Nation	Player
33	FW	FIN	Roni Porokara (from (Sweden) Örebro)
—	FW	COD	Junior Kabananga (on loan from (Belgium) Anderlecht)
—	DF	SRB	Nemanja Rnić (on loan from (Belgium) Anderlecht)

Out:

No.	Pos.	Nation	Player
11	FW	RWA	Henri Munyaneza (released)
31	DF	BEL	Mark De Man (on loan to (Belgium) OH Leuven)

=== Kortrijk ===
In:

No.	Pos.	Nation	Player
—	FW	SRB	Stefan Šćepović (on loan from (Belgium) Club Brugge)

Out:

No.	Pos.	Nation	Player
12	FW	GAM	Ibou Savaneh (on loan to (Belgium) Mechelen)
19	FW	BEL	Ilombe Mboyo (to (Belgium) Gent)
—	FW	CRO	Leon Benko (released)
—	FW	FRA	Cédric Bétrémieux (on loan to (Belgium) Mouscron Peruwelz)

=== Lierse ===
In:

No.	Pos.	Nation	Player
—	DF	SWE	Marcus Andreasson (from (Norway) Molde)
—	GK	ISL	Árni Gautur Arason (Unattached)
—	MF	GHA	Ibrahim Ayew (from (Egypt) Zamalek)
—	DF	HON	Víctor Bernárdez (on loan from (Belgium) Anderlecht)
—	FW	EGY	Sherif Fayed (from (Egypt) Wadi Degla)
—	MF	SRB	Miloš Marić (from (Germany) VfL Bochum)
—	MF	NOR	Alexander Mathisen (from (Norway) Aalesund)
—	DF	BEL	Kenny Thompson (from (Belgium) Gent)

Out:

No.	Pos.	Nation	Player
4	DF	FRA	Julien Tournut (to (Belgium) Waasland-Beveren)
12	GK	SRB	Vladan Kujović (released)
—	DF	BEL	Garry De Graef (to (Belgium) Turnhout)
—	DF	BEL	Timothy Dreesen (on loan to (Belgium) Turnhout)
—	MF	BEL	Kevin Janssens (on loan to (Belgium) Turnhout)
—	MF	MKD	Nderim Nedzipi (released)
—	MF	FRA	Benjamin Nicaise (on loan to (Greece) Panthrakikos)
—	DF	BEL	Kurt Van Dooren (to (Belgium) Heist)

=== Lokeren ===
In:

No.	Pos.	Nation	Player
15	FW	ISL	Alfreð Finnbogason (from (Iceland) Breiðablik)

Out:

No.	Pos.	Nation	Player
9	FW	FRA	Jérémy Perbet (on loan to (Belgium) Mons)
25	FW	NOR	Vegard Braaten (on loan to (Norway) Alta)
—	DF	BEL	Frédéric Dupré (released)

=== Mechelen ===
In:

No.	Pos.	Nation	Player
22	FW	CIV	Mohamed Koné (from (Thailand) Muangthong United)
—	DF	BEL	Jérémy Huyghebaert (from (France) Auxerre)
—	FW	BEL	Christian Kabasele (on loan from (Belgium) Eupen)
—	FW	BFA	Pierre Koulibaly (from (Libya) Al-Ittihad)
—	FW	GAM	Ibou Savaneh (on loan from (Belgium) Kortrijk)

Out:

No.	Pos.	Nation	Player
11	MF	BEL	Joachim Mununga (to (Turkey) Gençlerbirliği)

=== Sint-Truiden ===
In:

No.	Pos.	Nation	Player
—	MF	BEL	Grégory Dufer (from (Belgium) Standard Liège)
—	GK	BEL	Bram Castro (Unattached)
—	FW	NGA	Manasseh Ishiaku (on loan from (Germany) 1. FC Köln)

Out:

No.	Pos.	Nation	Player
7	MF	SEN	Pape Abdou Camara (loan return to (Belgium) Standard Liège)
10	MF	FRA	Grégory Christ (on loan to (Greece) Panthrakikos)
15	MF	BEL	Tom Caluwé (released)
20	MF	BEL	Benoit Masset (on loan to (Belgium) Grimbergen)

=== Standard Liège ===
In:

No.	Pos.	Nation	Player
37	DF	BEL	Jelle Van Damme (from (England) Wolverhampton)
—	DF	MAR	Abdelfettah Boukhriss (from (Morocco) FUS Rabat)
—	MF	SEN	Pape Abdou Camara (loan return from (Belgium) Sint-Truiden)
—	DF	BRA	Kanu (from (Portugal) Beira-Mar)
—	MF	BEL	Leroy Labylle (from (Belgium) Genk)

Out:

No.	Pos.	Nation	Player
12	MF	BEL	Grégory Dufer (to (Belgium) Sint-Truiden)
20	FW	COD	Eric Bokanga (released)
—	MF	GLP	Cédric Collet (released)

=== Westerlo ===
In:

No.	Pos.	Nation	Player
—	MF	BEL	Evariste Ngolok (from (Belgium) Dender)
—	DF	BEL	Jeroen Vanthournout (from (Belgium) Roeselare)

Out:

No.	Pos.	Nation	Player
26	FW	BEL	Soufiane Bidaoui (on loan to (Belgium) Roeselare)

=== Zulte Waregem ===
In:

No.	Pos.	Nation	Player

Out:

No.	Pos.	Nation	Player
—	DF	SEN	Zakaria Gueye (on loan to (France) Fréjus)
