= 2011–12 Belgian Pro League =

109th season of top-tier football in Belgium

Jupiler Pro League
- Season: 2011–12
- Champions: Anderlecht; 31st league title
- Relegated: Sint-Truiden; Westerlo
- Champions League: Anderlecht; Club Brugge
- Europa League: Lokeren; Genk; Gent
- Matches: 302
- Goals: 892 (2.95 per match)
- Top goalscorer: Jérémy Perbet (25 goals)
- Biggest home win: Gent 6–0 Sint-Truiden
- Biggest away win: Kortrijk 0–4 Gent, Genk 0–4 Anderlecht
- Highest scoring: Cercle Brugge 6–4 OH Leuven
- Longest winning run: 7 matches Anderlecht
- Longest unbeaten run: 16 matches Anderlecht
- Longest winless run: 13 matches Zulte Waregem
- Longest losing run: 6 matches Sint-Truiden; Westerlo

The 2011–12 season of the Belgian Pro League (also known as Jupiler Pro League for sponsorship reasons) was the 109th season of top-tier football in Belgium. It began on 29 July 2011 with the first match of the regular season and ended in May 2012 with the last matches of the playoff rounds. The defending champions were Genk, who this time ended in third position, while the competition was won by Anderlecht, who clenched the title after a 1–1 draw against Club Brugge with two games left to play in the Championship Playoff.

== Teams ==
=== Team changes ===
During the previous season, on 23 April 2011, Charleroi were relegated as a result of a 2–2 draw at home to Eupen in the relegation playoff, making it impossible to overtake them in the standings. This ended a spell of 26 consecutive seasons of being at the top level of Belgian football, with only Anderlecht, Club Brugge and Standard Liège being present for more years. As winner of the relegation playoff, Eupen avoided direct relegation, but was still forced to play the Second Division final round together with second division teams Lommel United, Waasland-Beveren and Mons for the final spot in first division. However, after losing four matches in a row, Eupen was also relegated on 19 May 2011 after just one season at the top level. In the final match between Mons and Waasland-Beveren, Mons eventually came out as winner of the final round and took the place of Eupen.

On 24 April 2011, just one day after the relegation of Charleroi, Oud-Heverlee Leuven was promoted after securing the title in the Second Division and as a result, the city of Leuven now has a first division team again for the first time in 61 years.

=== Stadia and locations ===
Location of teams in Belgian Pro League 2011-12

Club	Location	Venue	Capacity
R.S.C. Anderlecht	Anderlecht	Constant Vanden Stock Stadium	28,063
Beerschot AC	Antwerp	Olympisch Stadion	13,132
Cercle Brugge K.S.V.	Bruges	Jan Breydel Stadium	29,945
Club Brugge KV	Bruges	Jan Breydel Stadium	29,945
K.R.C. Genk	Genk	Cristal Arena	24,900
K.A.A. Gent	Ghent	Jules Ottenstadion	12,919
K.V. Kortrijk	Kortrijk	Guldensporen Stadion	9,500
Lierse S.K.	Lier	Herman Vanderpoortenstadion	14,538
K.S.C. Lokeren Oost-Vlaanderen	Lokeren	Daknamstadion	10,000
KV Mechelen	Mechelen	Argosstadion Achter de Kazerne	13,123
R.A.E.C. Mons	Mons	Stade Charles Tondreau	12,000
Oud-Heverlee Leuven	Leuven	Den Dreef	8,519
K. Sint-Truidense V.V.	Sint-Truiden	Staaienveld	11,250
Standard Liège	Liège	Stade Maurice Dufrasne	30,000
K.V.C. Westerlo	Westerlo	Het Kuipje	7,982
S.V. Zulte-Waregem	Waregem	Regenboogstadion	8,500

=== Personnel and sponsoring ===
Club	Chairman	Current manager	Team captain	Shirt sponsor
R.S.C. Anderlecht	(Belgium) Roger Vanden Stock	(Belgium) Ariël Jacobs	(Argentina) Lucas Biglia	BNP Paribas Fortis
Beerschot AC	(Belgium) Jos Verhaegen	no manager at end of season	(Uruguay) Gary Kagelmacher	Quick
Cercle Brugge K.S.V.	(Belgium) Frans Schotte	(Belgium) Bob Peeters	(Belgium) Hans Cornelis	A D M B
Club Brugge KV	(Belgium) Bart Verhaeghe	(Germany) Christoph Daum	(Belgium) Carl Hoefkens	Belfius
K.R.C. Genk	(Belgium) Herbert Houben	(Netherlands) Mario Been	(Belgium) David Hubert	Euphony
K.A.A. Gent	(Belgium) Ivan De Witte	(Norway) Trond Sollied	(Spain) César Arzo	VDK
K.V. Kortrijk	(Belgium) Jozef Allijns	(Belgium) Hein Vanhaezebrouck	(Serbia) Nebojša Pavlović	Digipass by VASCO
Lierse S.K.	(Egypt) Maged Samy	(Belgium) Chris Janssens	(Japan) Eiji Kawashima	Wadi Degla
K.S.C. Lokeren Oost-Vlaanderen	(Belgium) Roger Lambrecht	(Belgium) Peter Maes	(Belgium) Killian Overmeire	Q-Team VP Lambrecht
KV Mechelen	(Belgium) Johan Timmermans	(Belgium) Marc Brys	(France) Julien Gorius	Telenet
R.A.E.C. Mons	(Belgium) Dominique Leone	(Belgium) Enzo Scifo	(Belgium) Tom Van Imschoot	Holcim
Oud-Heverlee Leuven	(Belgium) Jan Callewaert	(Belgium) Ronny Van Geneugden	(Belgium) Bjorn Ruytinx	Option
K. Sint-Truidense V.V.	(Belgium) Bart Lammens	(Belgium) Franky Van der Elst	(Belgium) Peter Delorge	Belisol
Standard Liège	(Belgium) Roland Duchâtelet	(Belgium) José Riga	(Belgium) Jelle Van Damme	Nationale Loterij
K.V.C. Westerlo	(Belgium) Herman Wijnants	(Belgium) Jan Ceulemans	(Belgium) Jef Delen	Willy Naessens
S.V. Zulte-Waregem	(Belgium) Willy Naessens	(Belgium) Francky Dury	(Belgium) Karel D'Haene	Enfinity, Petrus

=== Managerial changes ===
Team	Outgoing manager	Manner of departure	Date of vacancy	Position	Replaced by	Date of appointment
Gent	(Belgium) Francky Dury	Mutual Consent	17 May 2011	Pre-season	(Norway) Trond Sollied	7 June 2011
Zulte-Waregem	(Belgium) Hugo Broos	Sacked	23 May 2011	Pre-season	(Bosnia and Herzegovina) Darije Kalezić	25 May 2011
Lierse	(Norway) Trond Sollied	Contract Ended	End of 2010-11 season	Pre-season	(Belgium) Chris Janssens	1 June 2011
Standard Liège	(Belgium) Dominique D'Onofrio	Contract Ended	6 June 2011	Pre-season	(Belgium) José Riga	28 June 2011
Genk	(Belgium) Franky Vercauteren	Signed for (United Arab Emirates) Al Jazira Club	18 August 2011	5th	(Netherlands) Mario Been	30 August 2011
Sint-Truiden	(Belgium) Guido Brepoels	Sacked	30 August 2011	15th	(Belgium) Franky Van der Elst	2 September 2011
Club Brugge	(Netherlands) Adrie Koster	Sacked	30 October 2011	4th	(Germany) Christoph Daum	9 November 2011
Zulte-Waregem	(Bosnia and Herzegovina) Darije Kalezić	Sacked	27 December 2011	14th	(Belgium) Francky Dury	30 December 2011
Mons	(Netherlands) Dennis van Wijk	Mutual agreement	28 February 2012	11th	(Belgium) Enzo Scifo	28 February 2012
Beerschot	(Belgium) Jacky Mathijssen	Mutual agreement	26 March 2012	11th	(Netherlands) Adrie Koster	1 June 2012

== Regular season ==
=== League table ===
Pos	Team	Pld	W	D	L	GF	GA	GD	Pts	Qualification
1	Anderlecht	30	20	7	3	61	26	+35	67	Qualification to Championship play-offs
2	Club Brugge	30	19	4	7	51	32	+19	61	Qualification to Championship play-offs
3	Gent	30	17	5	8	63	35	+28	56	Qualification to Championship play-offs
4	Standard Liège	30	14	9	7	43	33	+10	51	Qualification to Championship play-offs
5	Genk	30	13	7	10	60	44	+16	46	Qualification to Championship play-offs
6	Kortrijk	30	13	7	10	39	36	+3	46	Qualification to Championship play-offs
7	Cercle Brugge	30	13	7	10	36	37	−1	46	Qualification to Europa League play-offs
8	Lokeren	30	11	11	8	48	40	+8	44	Qualification to Europa League play-offs
9	Mechelen	30	10	7	13	40	50	−10	37	Qualification to Europa League play-offs
10	Mons	30	9	9	12	50	55	−5	36	Qualification to Europa League play-offs
11	Beerschot	30	9	9	12	45	51	−6	36	Qualification to Europa League play-offs
12	Lierse	30	6	13	11	24	36	−12	31	Qualification to Europa League play-offs
13	Zulte Waregem	30	6	12	12	32	38	−6	30	Qualification to Europa League play-offs
14	OH Leuven	30	7	8	15	38	58	−20	29	Qualification to Europa League play-offs
15	Westerlo	30	5	5	20	29	59	−30	20	Qualification to the Relegation play-offs
16	Sint-Truiden	30	3	10	17	32	61	−29	19	Qualification to the Relegation play-offs

Source: soccerway.com
Rules for classification: 1) points; 2) number of matches won; if teams are still tied a playoff is organised.

=== Positions by round ===
Note: The classification was made after the weekend (or midweek) of each matchday, so postponed matches were only processed at the time they were played to represent the real evolution in standings.

Only one match has been postponed during the season:

- On matchday 18: Cercle Brugge vs. Gent of 16 December because of a rain-drenched pitch, was played two days later on 18 December.

Team ╲ Round	1	2	3	4	5	6	7	8	9	10	11	12	13	14	15	16	17	18	19	20	21	22	23	24	25	26	27	28	29	30
Anderlecht	12	6	2	5	8	4	2	2	1	1	1	1	1	1	1	1	1	1	1	1	1	1	1	1	1	1	1	1	1	1
Club Brugge	1	1	1	2	4	3	1	1	3	2	3	4	4	4	3	3	2	3	3	3	3	3	3	3	2	2	2	2	2	2
Gent	14	13	8	3	1	1	4	3	2	3	2	2	2	2	2	2	3	2	2	2	2	2	2	2	3	3	3	3	3	3
Standard Liège	6	2	10	3	7	5	8	7	5	6	5	7	5	5	4	4	6	4	5	5	4	4	4	4	4	4	5	5	4	4
Genk	2	3	5	10	10	9	6	5	8	9	8	6	7	6	7	8	7	7	6	7	6	6	6	6	7	6	6	6	6	5
Kortrijk	6	10	6	9	6	10	7	8	6	7	6	5	6	7	6	5	4	5	4	4	5	5	5	5	5	7	7	7	7	6
Cercle Brugge	5	4	11	6	2	2	3	4	4	4	4	3	3	3	5	6	5	6	7	6	7	7	7	7	6	5	4	4	5	7
Lokeren	10	15	14	12	13	13	13	13	13	10	10	12	10	10	10	10	11	12	12	12	11	11	11	9	8	9	9	8	8	8
Mechelen	3	8	3	1	3	6	9	10	10	12	11	10	12	11	11	11	10	10	10	10	10	8	8	8	10	8	8	9	9	9
Beerschot	15	14	9	11	11	11	11	11	11	8	9	11	9	9	9	9	8	9	9	9	8	9	9	10	9	10	10	10	10	10
Mons	6	9	4	7	5	8	5	6	7	5	7	8	8	8	8	7	9	8	8	8	9	10	10	11	11	11	11	11	11	11
Lierse	6	10	13	14	14	14	14	14	15	14	14	14	14	14	14	14	14	13	13	13	13	13	12	12	12	12	12	12	12	12
Zulte Waregem	10	4	7	8	12	12	12	12	12	13	13	13	13	13	13	13	13	14	14	14	14	14	14	13	14	13	13	13	13	13
OH Leuven	3	7	12	13	9	7	10	9	9	11	12	9	11	12	12	12	12	11	11	11	12	12	13	14	13	14	14	14	14	14
Westerlo	16	16	16	16	16	16	15	15	14	15	15	15	16	16	16	16	16	15	15	15	15	15	15	15	15	15	15	16	15	15
Sint-Truiden	12	12	15	15	15	15	16	16	16	16	16	16	15	15	15	15	15	16	16	16	16	16	16	16	16	16	16	15	16	16

Source: soccerassociation.com

=== Results ===
Home \ Away	AND	BEE	CER	BRU	GNK	GNT	KVK	LIE	LOK	KVM	MON	OHL	STV	STA	WES	ZWA
Anderlecht		3–2	4–0	3–0	4–2	3–1	2–0	4–0	3–2	3–1	2–2	0–0	3–1	5–0	3–1	2–1
Beerschot	0–0		4–0	1–1	2–0	2–2	0–1	0–0	2–2	2–2	2–0	2–1	3–2	1–1	3–1	2–0
Cercle Brugge	1–0	2–1		1–2	3–2	0–1	1–2	0–0	1–1	1–0	1–1	2–0	2–2	0–1	3–1	1–0
Club Brugge	1–1	5–1	1–0		4–5	2–0	2–1	1–0	3–0	0–1	2–1	1–0	1–0	1–0	5–0	1–0
Genk	0–1	3–1	4–2	3–0		3–1	2–2	4–0	0–1	0–0	2–0	5–0	2–1	3–0	3–0	2–2
Gent	0–1	0–1	0–1	1–3	2–0		3–1	1–0	3–1	6–2	2–0	6–1	6–0	3–1	3–1	0–0
Kortrijk	0–1	2–0	2–0	2–1	3–2	0–4		1–1	2–5	1–0	2–2	2–0	4–0	2–0	1–0	0–0
Lierse	0–0	1–1	2–2	0–1	0–0	2–1	2–0		1–1	2–2	1–1	3–1	0–2	0–2	0–0	2–1
Lokeren	0–1	1–1	1–0	1–2	3–1	1–1	1–4	2–0		3–2	3–1	0–1	0–0	1–1	4–0	0–0
Mechelen	2–1	2–1	1–2	1–2	3–2	0–2	0–0	2–1	0–2		4–1	2–2	2–1	1–2	1–0	1–1
Mons	1–1	4–2	0–2	0–2	1–2	1–1	3–1	2–1	3–3	5–1		2–2	4–2	1–1	2–1	3–1
OH Leuven	2–1	3–2	2–3	3–1	1–1	2–3	0–2	0–0	1–1	1–2	3–1		3–1	1–3	1–1	2–2
Sint-Truiden	2–2	2–4	0–1	3–3	3–4	3–4	0–0	1–1	0–2	0–0	2–3	2–1		1–1	0–3	1–0
Standard Liège	1–2	6–1	0–0	2–1	0–0	0–0	3–1	2–0	3–1	3–2	2–1	4–0	0–0		1–0	1–0
Westerlo	1–2	3–1	1–3	0–1	3–2	2–3	0–0	0–2	2–4	1–3	2–1	1–3	2–0	0–0		1–1
Zulte Waregem	2–3	1–0	1–1	1–1	1–1	1–3	1–0	1–2	1–1	2–0	2–3	2–1	0–0	4–2	3–1	

Source: Soccerway
Legend: Blue = home team win; Yellow = draw; Red = away team win.

== Championship playoff ==
The points obtained during the regular season were halved (and rounded up) before the start of the playoff. As a result, the teams started with the following points before the playoff: Anderlecht 34 points, Club Brugge 31, Gent 28, Standard 26, Genk 23 and Kortrijk 23.

=== Playoff table ===
Pos	Team	Pld	W	D	L	GF	GA	GD	Pts	Qualification
1	Anderlecht (C)	10	5	3	2	16	8	+8	52	Qualification to Champions League third qualifying round
2	Club Brugge (Q)	10	5	2	3	14	11	+3	48	Qualification to Champions League third qualifying round
3	Genk (Q)	10	6	0	4	19	19	0	41	Qualification to Europa League third qualifying round
4	Gent	10	4	0	6	16	16	0	40	Qualification to Europa League Testmatch
5	Standard Liège	10	2	3	5	10	17	−7	35	
6	Kortrijk	10	3	2	5	16	20	−4	34	

Source: soccerway.com
Rules for classification: 1) points; 2) points after deduction of (possible) half points added due to rounding; 3) number of wins; 4) goal difference; 5) number of goals scored; 6) number of away goals scored; 7) number of away wins.
(C) Champions; (Q) Qualified for the phase indicated

=== Positions by round ===
Below the positions per round are shown. As teams did not all start with an equal number of points, the initial pre-playoffs positions are also given.

Team ╲ Round	Initial	1	2	3	4	5	6	7	8	9	10
Anderlecht	1	1	1	1	1	1	1	1	1	1	1
Club Brugge	2	2	2	2	2	2	2	2	2	2	2
Genk	5	6	6	4	3	3	4	3	3	3	3
Gent	3	3	3	3	4	4	3	4	4	4	4
Standard Liège	4	4	5	5	5	5	5	5	5	5	5
Kortrijk	6	5	4	6	6	6	6	6	6	6	6

=== Results ===
Home \ Away	AND	BRU	GNT	STA	GNK	KVK
Anderlecht		1–1	1–0	3–0	1–3	1–1
Club Brugge	0–1		1–0	2–0	2–0	3–2
Gent	1–4	2–1		3–0	3–1	2–3
Standard Liège	0–0	1–1	2–1		2–3	2–0
Genk	0–4	1–2	2–0	3–2		2–0
Kortrijk	2–0	3–1	1–4	1–1	3–4	

Legend: Blue = home team win; Yellow = draw; Red = away team win.

== Europa League playoff ==
Group A contains the teams finishing the regular season in positions 7, 9, 12 and 14. The teams finishing in positions 8, 10, 11 and 13 were placed in Group B.

=== Group A ===
Pos	Team	Pld	W	D	L	GF	GA	GD	Pts	Qualification	CER	OHL	LIE	KVM
1	Cercle Brugge	6	3	2	1	16	10	+6	11	Playoff Final		6–4	0–0	3–1
2	OH Leuven	6	3	1	2	15	14	+1	10		3–2		1–1	4–2
3	Lierse	6	1	4	1	7	7	0	7		2–2	1–2		2–1
4	Mechelen	6	1	1	4	7	14	−7	4		0–3	2–1	1–1	

Legend: Blue = home team win; Yellow = draw; Red = away team win.

=== Group B ===
Pos	Team	Pld	W	D	L	GF	GA	GD	Pts	Qualification	MON	ZWA	BEE	LOK
1	Mons	6	3	2	1	8	4	+4	11	Playoff Final		0–1	2–0	1–1
2	Zulte-Waregem	6	2	2	2	7	8	−1	8		0–2		2–0	2–2
3	Beerschot	6	2	1	3	9	10	−1	7		1–1	3–1		4–1
4	Lokeren	6	1	3	2	9	11	−2	6		1–2	1–1	3–1	

Legend: Blue = home team win; Yellow = draw; Red = away team win.

=== Europa League playoff final ===
The winners of both playoff groups competed in a two-legged match to play the fourth-placed team of the championship playoff, called Testmatch. The winners of this Testmatch were granted entry to the second qualifying round of the 2012–13 UEFA Europa League.

10 May 2012
20:30 CEST

Mons	0 – 1	Cercle Brugge
		Rudy 59'

Stade Charles Tondreau, Mons

14 May 2012
20:30 CEST

Cercle Brugge	3 – 2	Mons
Van Eenoo 54'; Mertens 74'; Gombami 85'		Jarju 20'; De Belder 90'

Jan Breydel Stadium, Bruges

Cercle Brugge won 4–2 on aggregate.

=== Testmatches Europa League ===
Europa League playoff final winners Cercle Brugge competed with fourth placed team Gent for the final European ticket. After a 7-2 aggregate win, Gent qualified for the second qualifying round of the 2012–13 UEFA Europa League.

17 May 2012
19:30 CEST

Cercle Brugge	1 – 5	Gent
Gombami 39'	report	Maréval 13'; Coulibaly 15'; El Ghanassy 49'; Jørgensen 66', 82'

Jan Breydel Stadium, Bruges

20 May 2012
14:30 CEST

Gent	2 – 1	Cercle Brugge
Mboyo 33', 76'	report	Dompig 9'

Jules Ottenstadion, Ghent

Gent won 7–2 on aggregate.

== Relegation playoff ==
The teams finishing in the last two positions Westerlo and Sint-Truiden, faced each other in the relegation playoff. Westerlo started with a three-point bonus and home advantage for finishing above Sint-Truiden during the regular season. Although the teams were scheduled to play each other 5 times, Westerlo forced the decision already after four matches making the last match obsolete. Thereby, Sint-Truiden was relegated and Westerlo was allowed to play the relegation playoffs with the teams from the Second Division.

Pos	Team	Pld	W	D	L	GF	GA	GD	Pts	Qualification or relegation
1	Westerlo (R)	4	3	0	1	12	6	+6	12	Belgian Second Division final round
2	Sint-Truiden (R)	4	1	0	3	6	12	−6	3	Relegation to 2012–13 Belgian Second Division

Source: soccerway.com
Rules for classification: 1) points; 2) head-to-head points; 3) head-to-head goal difference; 4) head-to-head goals scored; 5) goal difference; 6) number of goals scored.
(R) Relegated

Home \ Away	STV	WES	STV	WES	STV	WES
Sint-Truiden		3–1		1–4		
Westerlo	3–2		4–0		– (Note: Match not played as Sint-Truiden could no longer overtake Westerlo in the standings)	

Source: soccerway.com
Legend: Blue = home team win; Yellow = draw; Red = away team win.

== Top goalscorers ==
Source: sporza.be and Sport.be (in Dutch)

Position	Player	Club	Goals
1	(France) Jérémy Perbet	Mons	25
2	(Belgium) Jelle Vossen	Genk	21
3	(Belgium) Christian Benteke	Genk	16
4	(Nigeria) Joseph Akpala	Club Brugge	15
4	(Democratic Republic of the Congo) Dieumerci Mbokani	Anderlecht	15
4	(Belgium) Jordan Remacle	OH Leuven	15
7	(Belgium) Guillaume Gillet	Anderlecht	14
7	(France) Julien Gorius	Mechelen	14
9	(Argentina) Hernán Losada	Beerschot	13
10	(Belgium) Benjamin De Ceulaer	Lokeren	12
10	(Tunisia) Hamdi Harbaoui	Lokeren	12
10	(Belgium) Ilombe Mboyo	Gent	12
10	(Portugal) Rudy	Cercle Brugge	12
10	(Argentina) Matías Suárez	Anderlecht	12

11 goals (5 players)
- (Denmark) Jesper Jørgensen (Gent)
- (Belgium) Bernd Thijs (Gent)
- (Serbia) Dalibor Veselinović (Kortrijk)
- (Iran) Reza Ghoochannejhad (Sint-Truiden)
- (Belgium) Mohammed Tchité (Standard Liège)
10 goals (1 player)
- (Nigeria) Chuka (OH Leuven)
9 goals (4 players)
- (Serbia) Milan Jovanović (Anderlecht)
- (Senegal) Ibrahima Sidibe (Beerschot (6)/Westerlo (3))
- (Israel) Elyaniv Barda (Genk)
- (Cameroon) Ernest Nfor (Kortrijk)
8 goals (8 players)
- (Belgium) Igor Vetokele (Cercle Brugge)
- (Belgium) Thomas Buffel (Genk)
- (Belgium) Kevin De Bruyne (Genk)
- (Slovenia) Zlatan Ljubijankič (Gent)
- (France) Steeven Joseph-Monrose (Kortrijk)
- (Belgium) Alessandro Cordaro (Mechelen)
- (The Gambia) Ibou (Mons)
- (Brazil) Reynaldo (Westerlo)
7 goals (5 players)
- (Netherlands) Sherjill MacDonald (Beerschot)
- (Belgium) Lukas Van Eenoo (Cercle Brugge)
- (Senegal) Elimane Coulibaly (Gent)
- (South Africa) Daylon Claasen (Lierse)
- (Belgium) Grégory Dufer (Sint-Truiden)
6 goals (16 players)
- (Israel) Roei Dayan (Beerschot)
- (Portugal) Amido Baldé (Cercle Brugge)
- (Belgium) Maxime Lestienne (Club Brugge)
- (Israel) Lior Refaelov (Club Brugge)
- (Spain) Víctor Vázquez (Club Brugge)
- (Belgium) Björn Vleminckx (Club Brugge)
- (France) Rémi Maréval (Gent (3)/Zulte Waregem (3))
- (Morocco) Mustapha Oussalah (Kortrijk)
- (Egypt) Mohamed El-Gabbas (Lierse)
- (Senegal) Boubacar Diabang (Mechelen)
- (France) Rachid Bourabia (Mons)
- (Belgium) Giuseppe Rossini (Sint-Truiden (3)/Zulte Waregem (3))
- (Belgium) Michy Batshuayi (Standard Liège)
- (Ivory Coast) Cyriac (Standard Liège)
- (Senegal) Mbaye Leye (Standard Liège (3)/Zulte Waregem (3))
- (Belgium) Jens Naessens (Zulte Waregem)
5 goals (10 players)
- (Ukraine) Oleg Iachtchouk (Cercle Brugge)
- (Belgium) Tim Smolders (Gent)
- (Argentina) Pablo Chavarría (Kortrijk)
- (Serbia) Miloš Marić (Lierse)
- (Senegal) Baye Djiby Fall (Lokeren)
- (Belgium) David Destorme (Mechelen)
- (Colombia) Jaime Alfonso Ruiz (Mechelen)
- (Belgium) Jelle Van Damme (Standard Liège)
- (Belgium) Steven De Petter (Westerlo)
- (Belgium) Bart Goor (Westerlo)
4 goals (16 players)
- (Hungary) Roland Juhász (Anderlecht)
- (Brazil) Kanu (Anderlecht)
- (United States) Sacha Kljestan (Anderlecht)
- (Uruguay) Gary Kagelmacher (Beerschot)
- (Zimbabwe) Vuza Nyoni (Beerschot)
- (Morocco) Nabil Dirar (Club Brugge)
- (Netherlands) Ryan Donk (Club Brugge)
- (Belgium) Vadis Odjidja-Ofoe (Club Brugge)
- (Belgium) Christian Brüls (Gent)
- (Belgium) Yassine El Ghanassy (Gent)
- (Belgium) Nill De Pauw (Lokeren)
- (Switzerland) Mijat Marić (Lokeren)
- (Belgium) Bjorn Ruytinx (OH Leuven)
- (Belgium) Yoni Buyens (Standard Liège)
- (Venezuela) Luis Manuel Seijas (Standard Liège)
- (Israel) Shlomi Arbeitman (Westerlo)
3 goals (28 players)
- (Belgium) Tom De Sutter (Anderlecht)
- (Democratic Republic of the Congo) Patou Kabangu (Anderlecht)
- (Poland) Marcin Wasilewski (Anderlecht)
- (Belgium) Guillaume François (Beerschot)
- (Finland) Roni Porokara (Beerschot)
- (Belgium) Kristof D'haene (Cercle Brugge)
- (Belgium) Kevin Janssens (Cercle Brugge)
- (Colombia) Carlos Bacca (Club Brugge)
- (Belgium) Thomas Meunier (Club Brugge)
- (Spain) Melli (Gent)
- (Belgium) Brecht Capon (Kortrijk)
- (Hungary) Péter Czvitkovics (Kortrijk)
- (Serbia) Nebojša Pavlović (Kortrijk)
- (Bosnia and Herzegovina) Ervin Zukanović (Kortrijk)
- (Senegal) Ibrahima Gueye (Lokeren)
- (Belgium) Benjamin Mokulu (Lokeren)
- (Belgium) Koen Persoons (Lokeren)
- (Republic of the Congo) Maël Lépicier (Mons)
- (Belgium) Thomas Azevedo (OH Leuven)
- (Belgium) Frederik Boi (OH Leuven)
- (Belgium) Karel Geraerts (OH Leuven)
- (Ukraine) Sacha Iakovenko (OH Leuven)
- (France) Grégory Christ (Sint-Truiden)
- (Belgium) Evariste Ngolok (Westerlo)
- (Belgium) Teddy Chevalier (Zulte Waregem)
- (Belgium) Davy De Fauw (Zulte Waregem)
- (Belgium) Jérémy Serwy (Zulte Waregem)
- (North Macedonia) Aleksandar Trajkovski (Zulte Waregem)
2 goals (36 players)
- (Argentina) Lucas Biglia (Anderlecht)
- (Belgium) Romelu Lukaku (Anderlecht)
- (Belgium) Anthony Portier (Cercle Brugge)
- (Belgium) Carl Hoefkens (Club Brugge)
- (Tunisia) Fabien Camus (Genk)
- (Belgium) Jeroen Simaeys (Genk)
- (Hungary) Dániel Tőzsér (Genk)
- (Spain) César Arzo (Gent)
- (Ivory Coast) Yaya Soumahoro (Gent)
- (Belgium) Hannes van der Bruggen (Gent)
- (Belgium) Jason Adesanya (Lierse)
- (North Macedonia) Boban Grnčarov (Lierse)
- (Belgium) Wesley Sonck (Lierse)
- (South Africa) Ayanda Patosi (Lokeren)
- (Belgium) Katuku Tshimanga (Lokeren)
- (Bosnia and Herzegovina) Boris Pandža (Mechelen)
- (The Gambia) Mustapha Jarju (Mons)
- (Belgium) Tim Matthys (Mons)
- (France) Jérémy Sapina (Mons)
- (Belgium) Tom van Imschoot (Mons)
- (Czech Republic) Radek Dejmek (OH Leuven)
- (Germany) Sascha Kotysch (Sint-Truiden)
- (Belgium) Dolly Menga (Sint-Truiden)
- (Belgium) Nils Schouterden (Sint-Truiden)
- (France) Franck Berrier (Standard Liège (1)/Zulte Waregem (1))
- (Brazil) Felipe (Standard Liège)
- (Uruguay) Ignacio María González (Standard Liège)
- (Brazil) Kanu (Standard Liège)
- (Belgium) Geoffrey Mujangi Bia (Standard Liège)
- (Belgium) Lens Annab (Westerlo)
- (Belgium) Dieter Dekelver (Westerlo)
- (Ghana) William Owusu (Westerlo)
- (France) Jonathan Delaplace (Zulte Waregem)
- (Central African Republic) Habib Habibou (Zulte Waregem)
- (Denmark) Brian Hamalainen (Zulte Waregem)
- (Belgium) Thomas Matton (Zulte Waregem)
1 goal (79 players)
- (Brazil) Fernando Canesin (Anderlecht)
- (Belgium) Nathan Kabasele (Anderlecht)
- (Belgium) Arnor Angeli (Beerschot)
- (Bosnia and Herzegovina) Adnan Čustović (Beerschot)
- (Belgium) Wim De Decker (Beerschot)
- (Belgium) Conor Laerenbergh (Beerschot)
- (Israel) Dor Malul (Beerschot)
- (Croatia) Tomislav Mikulić (Beerschot)
- (Belgium) Hans Cornelis (Cercle Brugge)
- (Belgium) Bernt Evens (Cercle Brugge)
- (Belgium) Gregory Mertens (Cercle Brugge)
- (Brazil) Renato Neto (Cercle Brugge)
- (Belgium) William Carvalho (Cercle Brugge)
- (Spain) Jordi (Club Brugge)
- (Norway) Mushaga Bakenga (Club Brugge)
- (Denmark) Niki Zimling (Club Brugge)
- (Belgium) David Hubert (Genk)
- (Trinidad and Tobago) Khaleem Hyland (Genk)
- (Germany) Torben Joneleit (Genk)
- (Belgium) Anthony Limbombe (Genk)
- (Brazil) Nadson (Genk)
- (Belgium) Anthony Vanden Borre (Genk)
- (Guinea) Ibrahima Sory Conte (Gent)
- (Mali) Mamoutou N'Diaye (Gent)
- (Brazil) Rafinha (Gent)
- (Belgium) Brecht Dejaeghere (Kortrijk)
- (Belgium) Gertjan De Mets (Kortrijk)
- (Belgium) Mohamed Messoudi (Kortrijk)
- (Belgium) David Vandenbroek (Kortrijk)
- (Angola) Flávio Amado (Lierse)
- (Ghana) Cofie Bekoe (Lierse)
- (Morocco) Soufiane Bidaoui (Lierse)
- (Belgium) Kris De Wree (Lierse)
- (Belgium) Frédéric Frans (Lierse)
- (Belgium) Stein Huysegems (Lierse)
- (Hungary) Péter Kovács (Lierse)
- (Ivory Coast) Barry Boubacar Copa (Lokeren)
- (Belgium) Laurens De Bock (Lokeren)
- (Iceland) Alfreð Finnbogason (Lokeren)
- (Croatia) Ivan Leko (Lokeren)
- (Belgium) Killian Overmeire (Lokeren)
- (France) Jérémy Taravel (Lokeren)
- (Belgium) Maxime Biset (Mechelen)
- (Belgium) Seth De Witte (Mechelen)
- (Ghana) Abdul-Yakuni Iddi (Mechelen)
- (Portugal) Sérgio Oliveira (Mechelen)
- (Belgium) Wannes Van Tricht (Mechelen)
- (France) Chris Makiese (Mons)
- (Democratic Republic of the Congo) Zola Matumona (Mons)
- (France) Benjamin Nicaise (Mons)
- (Belgium) Nicolas Timmermans (Mons)
- (Sweden) Patrick Amoah (OH Leuven)
- (Belgium) Loris Brogno (OH Leuven)
- (Belgium) Emmerik De Vriese (OH Leuven)
- (Belgium) Nicky Hayen (OH Leuven)
- (Iceland) Stefan Gislason (OH Leuven)
- (Belgium) Pieter Nys (OH Leuven)
- (Belgium) Wim Raymaekers (OH Leuven)
- (Belgium) Kevin Roelandts (OH Leuven)
- (Belgium) Ludovic Buysens (Sint-Truiden)
- (Belgium) Koen Daerden (Sint-Truiden)
- (Belgium) Vincent Euvrard (Sint-Truiden)
- (Italy) Alessandro Iandoli (Sint-Truiden)
- (Belgium) Pierre-Yves Ngawa (Sint-Truiden)
- (Austria) Rubin Okotie (Sint-Truiden)
- (Belgium) Yannick Rymenants (Sint-Truiden)
- (Nigeria) Imoh Ezekiel (Standard Liège)
- (Togo) Serge Gakpé (Standard Liège)
- (Haiti) Réginal Goreux (Standard Liège)
- (Cameroon) Aloys Nong (Standard Liège)
- (Brazil) Ellenton Liliu (Westerlo)
- (Germany) Felix Luz (Westerlo)
- (Brazil) Marcão (Westerlo)
- (Belgium) Jeroen Vanthournout (Westerlo)
- (Belgium) Stef Wils (Westerlo)
- (Spain) Juande (Westerlo)
- (Belgium) Miguel Dachelet (Zulte Waregem)
- (Belgium) Karel D'Haene (Zulte Waregem)
- (Iceland) Ólafur Ingi Skúlason (Zulte Waregem)
2 Own goals (3 players)
- (Belgium) Baptiste Martin (Kortrijk), scored for Mons and Genk)
- (Croatia) Tomislav Mikulić (Beerschot, scored for Genk and Mons)
- (Belgium) Denis Viane (Cercle Brugge, scored twice for Genk)
1 Own goal (19 players)
- (Brazil) Samuel (Anderlecht, scored for OH Leuven)
- (Portugal) Nuno Reis (Cercle Brugge, scored for Sint-Truiden)
- (Norway) Tom Høgli (Club Brugge, scored for Mechelen)
- (Senegal) Alpha Bâ (Gent, scored for Westerlo)
- (Senegal) Elimane Coulibaly (Gent, scored for Genk)
- (France) Alassane També (Kortrijk, scored for Lokeren)
- (Belgium) Kristof Van Hout (Kortrijk, scored for Club Brugge)
- (Serbia) Dalibor Veselinović (Kortrijk), scored for Gent)
- (North Macedonia) Boban Grnčarov (Lierse), scored for Cercle Brugge)
- (Belgium) Koen Persoons (Lokeren, scored for Mechelen)
- (Belgium) Wouter Biebauw (Mechelen, scored for Standard Liège)
- (Taiwan) Xavier Chen (Mechelen, scored for Beerschot)
- (Belgium) Kenny van Hoevelen (Mechelen, scored for Beerschot)
- (Belgium) Kevin Roelandts (OH Leuven, scored for Club Brugge)
- (Belgium) Peter Delorge (Sint-Truiden, scored for Mons)
- (Germany) Sascha Kotysch (Sint-Truiden, scored for Gent)
- (Belgium) Wim Mennes (Sint-Truiden, scored for Mons)
- (Belgium) Jelle Van Damme (Standard Liège, scored for OH Leuven)
- (Belgium) Wouter Corstjens (Westerlo, scored for Club Brugge)

== Attendances ==
No.	Club	Average attendance	Change	Highest
1	Standard de Liège	24,613	-2,0%	30,000
2	Club Brugge	24,159	4,3%	28,200
3	Anderlecht	22,254	-1,7%	23,862
4	Genk	21,820	5,5%	23,659
5	Gent	10,985	6,5%	12,414
6	Mechelen	10,251	-8,6%	12,550
7	Cercle Brugge	8,469	13,1%	20,643
8	Lierse	8,096	-20,3%	10,325
9	STVV	8,094	8,3%	10,170
10	Beerschot	7,701	-6,3%	10,481
11	Zulte Waregem	7,439	6,8%	9,428
12	Oud-Heverlee Leuven	7,280	121,0%	9,000
13	Kortrijk	6,933	15,0%	9,200
14	Westerlo	5,488	6,9%	8,200
15	Sporting Lokeren	5,002	-17,5%	8,035
16	RAEC	4,566	167,2%	8,600

== See also ==
- List of Belgian football transfers summer 2011
- List of Belgian football transfers winter 2011–12
