= List of S.L. Benfica (Luanda) players =

Sport Luanda e Benfica is an Angolan football (soccer) club based in Luanda, Angola and plays at Estádio 11 de Novembro. The club was established in 1922.

== 2011–2016 ==
S.L. Benfica (Luanda) players 2011–2016

Nat	#	Nick	Name	A	P	L.M.	A.A.	R.F.	Zeca Amaral			–
Nat	#	Nick	Name	A	P	2011	2012	2013	2014	2015	2016	2017
Nat	#	Nick	Name	A	P	13	12	10	3	3	6	–
(Angola)		Adawa	Adawá Mokanga	30	MF				→	2		
(Angola)		Ady Paulo	Agostinho Domingos Paulo	26	MF				→	16	16	→
(Angola)		Alberto Munhelele	Alberto da Silva Munhelele	29	FW	→	21					
(Cape Verde)		Alex Fernandes	Aires Sulivandro Marques Fernandes	29	MF				→	21		
(Angola)		Álvaro Tatala	Álvaro Sunga Tatala		FW			17				
(Angola)		Amaro	Amândio Manuel Filipe da Costa	30	MF				→	11	11	→
(Guinea-Bissau)		Amido Baldé	Amido Baldé	25	FW						9	
(Angola)		Anastácio	Anastácio Manuel da Costa	31	DF				→	27	→	
(Angola)		Anderson			DF					30	30	→
(Angola)		Ângelo Manuel	Ângelo Sebastião Manuel	29	GK	→	1	–				
(Angola)		Arsénio Manuel	Arsénio Bartolomeu Manuel	23	MF			29	→			
(Angola)		Asha			MF			31				
(Angola)		Avex	Avelino Eduardo António Craque	29	MF	→	10	10	→			
(Senegal)		Babacar Fall	Babacar Fall	24	DF			13				
(Angola)		Baby	Valdemar Denso António	24	MF						6	→
(Angola)		Bebeto Vieira	Abel Miguel Vieira	31	MF	→	17	→				
(Angola)		Bena	Diveluca Simão Nascimento	32	FW				→	17	17	→
(Angola)		Beto			FW			–				
(Angola)		Béu	Orfeu Francisco Manuel Neto		MF			9				
(Angola)		Bolingó Pina	Edvaldo Elvis Calado de Pina	26	MF	2011	→					
(Angola)		Borges, Cláudio	Cláudio Ricardo Cunha Borges	33	DF						15	→
(Angola)		Bota	Miguel João Canhanga	34	MF	2011	→	→	–			
(Portugal)		Braga	Bruno Manuel Araújo Braga	31	MF				20			
(Angola)		Buba	Buba Gessi		FW			18				
(Angola)		Bumba	Pedro António da Costa	27	MF		→	26				
(Angola)		Capita	Evanilson de Jesus Pedro	21	FW	2011						
(Angola)		Castela		24	MF			37				
(Angola)		Castro Cuambi	Manuel de Castro Masiala Cuambi	27	MF				18	→		
(Angola)		Dadão Domingos	Osvaldo Marinho Domingos	30	MF			36	→			
(Zambia)		Danny	Danny Hangunyu	33	FW	→	12	12	→			
(Angola)		Debele	Edgar Elias Hebo Kissanga	28	DF			→	4	4	4	→
(Angola)		Dedé Carvalho	Adérito Waldemar Alves de Carvalho	34	MF				23	23		
(Angola)		Destino			FW	2011	–	–				
(Mali)		Diakité	Mourtala Diakité	35	MF				15	15	→	
(Angola)		Dietho	Isidro Domingos João	28	GK	→	22	12				
(Angola)		Djamin			FW		8	8				
(Brazil)		Douglas	Douglas Tardin	24	FW						19	
(Angola)		Edson Guanza	João Guanza		DF			24				
(Angola)		Elber	Jorge Mota Faial Delgado	25	GK			→	12	12	12	→
(Angola)		Enoque Guilherme	Enoque Paulo Guilherme	25	DF	→	5					
(Democratic Republic of the Congo)		Eric Bokanga	Eric Bokanga Musau	27	FW			→	7	7	7	
(Brazil)		Fabrício Simões	Fabrício Santos Simões	31	FW				→	9		
(Brazil)		Fernando Silva	Fernando Júnior Pereira da Silva	34	GK						1	→
(Angola)		Filipe Silva	Israel Kipindi Pacote da Silva	27	FW			–				
(Cape Verde)		Fock	Fredson Jorge Ramos Tavares	33	GK					1		
(Angola)		Fofaná	Pedro Cassunda Domingos	30	MF	→	29	→				
(Brazil)		Gefferson	Gefferson da Silva Goulart	33	MF	2011						
(Cape Verde)		Gerson Centeio	Adilson Centeio Araújo	28	MF				21			
(Angola)		Gilberto	Felisberto Sebastião da Graça Amaral	33	MF				→	20		
(Angola)		Gomito Cassule	António Gonçalo Cassule	32	DF				→	13	→	
(Angola)		Gomito Fonseca	Nelson Sumbo Fonseca	25	DF				→	24	24	→
(Angola)		Guilherme Garcia	Sebastião Guilherme Garcia	28	GK	2011	→	12	→			
(Angola)		Guimbarra			DF		2					
(Angola)		Hélder Soares	Hélder Pelinganga Domingos Soares	32	DF	→	23		–			
(Angola)		Hélio Roque	Hélio José Lopes Roque	31	FW					8	8	→
(Cape Verde)		Herman	Herman Delgado Sousa					20	–			
(Angola)		Hernâni			DF			–				
(Angola)		Hippi	Domingos Paulo João José		DF	2011	–	14				
(Democratic Republic of the Congo)		Ilonga	Ilonga Lifu Taty		DF			5				
(Angola)		Israel			FW			19				
(Angola)		Italiano			GK			–				
(Poland)		Jacek	Jacek Magdziński	30	FW						23	→
(Malawi)		James Sangala	James Sangala	27	DF	→	15	15				
(Cameroon)		Jean-Claude Amougou	Jean-Claude Amougou	24	MF				6	6		
(Brazil)		Jeferson	Jeferson Miguel da Silva	30	DF				5	5	5	→
(Angola)		Jesse	Jesse Francisco Lamech Zau		MF	→	7	7				
(Angola)		João Vala	João José Delgado Vala	31	DF	→	11					
(Angola)		Joãozinho Machado	João Artur Machado	32	DF	→	–	26				
(Democratic Republic of the Congo)		Kijo	Kidima Kijo Kibondo		MF	2011						
(Angola)		Kikas Assis	Francisco Caetano Monteiro de Assis	30	DF	2011						
(Angola)		Kilombo	Paulino Joaquim Clemente	25	MF			33	→			
(Angola)		Kiloy	Junqueira Jacinto Dala	22	MF						27	→
(Democratic Republic of the Congo)		Kizamba	Alain Muana Kizamba	34	GK	2011	→		22			
(Angola)		Langanga	Landu Langanga	19	GK					28		
(Angola)		Laúcha	Ivan Cláudio França Joanes	29	MF			→	18			
(Angola)		Lírio	Lírio Manuel Cabanda Francisco	22	DF	2011	–		30	3		
(Angola)		Lito Firmino	Domingos Lito Firmino	29	DF	2011	13	13	2	2		
(Angola)		Macaia	José Macaia Ganga	22	MF					→	29	→
(Angola)		Man Sapas	Paulino dos Santos Manuel			2011						
(Angola)		Manaia	Valter Américo dos Santos Manaia	30	GK	2011						
(Mozambique)		Manú Lopes	Manuel de Jesus Lopes	32	MF			→	26			
(Angola)		Manucho Martins	Faustino Alberto Martins	23	MF	2011	9	9				
(Angola)		Manuel Gaspar	Manuel da Costa Gaspar	27	MF						2	→
(Angola)		Mariano Luvunga	Mariano Ribeiro Luvunga	28	MF				→	26	26	→
(Angola)		Massinga	Moisés Armando Yango	28	FW			→	16	16		
(Angola)		Mateus Santos	Mateus Agostinho Luís dos Santos	30	MF	2011						
(Angola)		Mendes Ginga	Mário Olegário Pascoal Ginga	33	MF	→	16	16				
(Angola)		Miguel Quiame	Miguel Geraldo Quiame	24	DF				29	29	→	
(Angola)		Milton Suca	Milton Alberto de O. Suca	21	MF						–	→
(Angola)		Minguito Fernandes	Domingos dos Santos Fernandes	31	MF			→	19	→		
(Angola)		Mola			DF			23				
(Angola)		Mussumari	Gabriel Frederico Mussumari	23	DF	2011	→					
(Angola)		Ndó	António Nenuele Nelo	27	MF	2011		11				
(Portugal)		Oliveira, António	António Manuel Silva Oliveira	29	MF			→	10	→		
(Angola)		Oliveira			GK			–				
(Cameroon)		Olivier	Frank Olivier Ongfiang	28	MF			–				
(Angola)		Olívio	Olívio Mendonça Luciano		DF	2011		–				
(Angola)		Osório	Osório Smith de Freitas Carvalho	34	MF					28	→	
(Angola)		Pacheco	Ladislau Manuel Pacheco Resende								13	
(Angola)		Paíto Fernandes	Manuel Gaspar Fernandes	29	MF	2011	6	6				
(Angola)		Paizinho Calenga	Hercânio Chitaca Calenga	31	FW			→	30	→		
(Angola)		Panilson	Feliciano Felisberto Javela	27	DF					→	21	→
(Angola)		Pedro Bengui	Pedro Bengui	22	FW		25	25	25	25		
(Portugal)		Pires	Jorge Costa Pires	33	FW				9			
(Angola)		Pitchu			DF	2011						
(Angola)		Pitéu			FW			–				
(Angola)		Rasca	Maieco Domingos Henrique António	32	FW			27	27	→		
(Brazil)		Reginaldo	Reginaldo Silva Santos	31	FW	2011						
(Portugal)		Rúben	Rúben Sílvio Lino Gouveia	30	MF				→	18	→	
(Angola)		Salú	Salustino Mucuambe Camilo Cachicote	25	MF	2011						
(Ivory Coast)		Savané	Savane Aly Touré	26	MF				→	10	10	→
(Brazil)		Sidney Candeias	Eduardo Martins Candeias	29	DF						18	→
(Angola)		Tchitchi	Cláudio Joaquim Segunda Adão	24	MF	2011		→				
(Angola)		Tchube	Ilídio G. da Silva		MF	2011	28	28				
(Angola)		Tião	Sebastião Felix Pereira de Carvalho	33	DF		→	2				
(Cape Verde)		Tom	António Sérgio Lopes Tavares	25	MF	→	20	→				
(Angola)		Totó	Osvaldo Cornélio Paulo Candeia	30	MF	2011		→	24	→		
(Angola)		Toy Kongo	André Augusto Miranda Kongo	28	GK				→	22	22	→
(Democratic Republic of the Congo)		Tshukuma	Mboyo Itoko Jean Claude	29	FW		→	21	→			
(Angola)		Vadinho	Hamlet Divalde Sousa Campos	26	DF	2011	→					
(Angola)		Vado Cabanda	Vado Cabanda	21	DF		3	3	3			
(Angola)		Vado Dias	Dorivaldo António Dias	29	FW			→	14	14	14	→
(Angola)		Wilson Alegre	Wilson Edgar Pereira Alegre	30	GK			→	1	→		
(Angola)		Yoyó		22	MF			38				
(Angola)		Zé Domingos	José Domingos	26	GK			–				
(Angola)		Zé Trindade	Josué dos Anjos Romeu Trindade		DF	2011	4	4				
Years						2011	2012	2013	2014	2015	2016	2017

== 2001–2010 ==
S.L. Benfica (Luanda) players 2001–2010

Nat	Nick	Name	A	P	M.G.	K.R.	H.F.	K.R.	Zeca Amaral				J.M.	J.M.	
Nat	Nick	Name	A	P	2001	2002	2003	2004	2005	2006	2007	2008	2009	2010	
Nat	Nick	Name	A	P	9	8	12	2	5	8	10	5	3	10	
(Angola)	Adawa	Adawá Mokanga	–	MF								→	2009	15	→
(Angola)	Aílton	Sebastião Patrício Micolo		MF						→	21				
(Angola)	Amaro	Amândio Felipe da Costa	–	MF					2005	2006	20	2008	2009	9	→
(Democratic Republic of the Congo)	Amisi	Amisi Kaniki Pedro												–	
(Angola)	Ângelo			FW										–	
(Angola)	Aurélio Soares	Aurélio de Sousa Soares	29	DF			2003								
(Angola)	Avex	Avelino Eduardo António Craque	–	MF					2005	2006	14	→	2009	→	
(Angola)	Avozinho						2003								
(Angola)	Bena	Diveluca Simão Nascimento	–	FW							–				
(Angola)	Beto		–	FW										–	↑
(Democratic Republic of the Congo)	Bocandé	Carlos Bernardo Fuma		DF					2005						
(Angola)	Bota	Miguel João Canhanga	–	MF						→	8	2008	2009	16	↑
(Angola)	Buco	Francisco Buco Gonçalves	28	DF					2005	2006	28	2008	2009	–	→
(Angola)	Buta	Pedro Buta					2003								
(Angola)	Castela		–	MF								2008			
(Angola)	Cola													–	
(Angola)	Cubano			FW			2003								
(Angola)	Dady			MF						2006					
(Democratic Republic of the Congo)	Dede Dikilu	Nlandu Dede Dikilu		GK						2006	1				
(Angola)	Devigor	Valdo Euclides da Costa	32	FW					2005	2006	–	→	2009		
(Angola)	Dié Kiala	Bulay João Domingos Kiala		GK									2009		
(Angola)	Dodó		28	FW								2008	2009		
(Angola)	Dominguês		25	FW								2008			
(Democratic Republic of the Congo)	Ekobolo	Ramazani Ewuizi	34	GK					→	2006	–	→			
(Angola)	Elson	Elson de Sousa Augusto		DF					→	2006					
(Democratic Republic of the Congo)	Eric Bokanga	Eric Bokanga Musau	–	FW							27	2008			
(Angola)	Escurinho Gomes	Abraão Jacinto Gomes		MF				→	2005	2006					
(Brazil)	Fabrício Santos	Fabrício Brandão Santos	25	DF							–				
(Guinea-Bissau)	Fernandes, João	João Nunes Fernandes	28	FW										31	→
(Angola)	Gugas	Agostinho José Kassinda da Silva		DF						→	–				
(Angola)	Guilherme Garcia	Sebastião Guilherme Garcia	–	GK									→	–	↑
(Democratic Republic of the Congo)	Hero	Onema Ehomba	31	DF					2005	2006	4				
(Angola)	Hippi	Domingos Paulo João José	–	MF								→	2009	–	↑
(Angola)	Hugo Ndulo	João André Kuya Ndulo	30	MF							–	2008	2009		
(Angola)	Igor			MF								2008			
(Angola)	Ivo Calei	Carlos Mbaca Calei												–	→
(Angola)	Joaquim						2003								
(Angola)	Joni	Osvaldo Roque Gonçalves da Cruz	33	MF			2003								
(Angola)	Josemar Tomás	Jorge de Carvalho Tomás		GK			2003	→							
(Angola)	Joy		23	FW								2008			
(Angola)	Júnior			FW								→	2009		
(Angola)	Kadima Silva	Kadima Adão Santos da Silva		FW								→	2009		
(Democratic Republic of the Congo)	Kalusha †	Manianga Banza	28	MF					→	2006	→				
(Angola)	Kikas Assis	Francisco Caetano Monteiro de Assis	–	DF							→	2008	2009	→	
(Angola)	Kilombo	Paulino Joaquim Clemente	–	MF								2008	→		↑
(Angola)	Kilú	Gilberto Cristóvão Francisco		GK					2005						
(Democratic Republic of the Congo)	Kizamba, Alain	Alain Muana Kizamba	–	GK							22	2008	2009	22	↑
(Angola)	Kumaca	Adriano da Costa Mateus Alberto	26	DF			2003	→	2005	→					
(Angola)	Lagos	Lagos Francisco Mendes Kitenda	28	DF							→	2008	2009	5	→
(Angola)	Lamá Bunzeye	Addy Bunzeye		GK					2005		12				
(Angola)	Lami Zinga	Guilherme Zinga		GK										1	→
(Angola)	Laurindo	Laurindo Alberto Tavares Lopes												–	
(Angola)	Lito Firmino	Domingos Lito Firmino	–	DF									2009	–	↑
(Angola)	Lito Hamuti	Paulino Tiago Hamuti	29	DF					2005	2006	2	2008			
(Angola)	Locó	Manuel Armindo Morais Cange	21	DF			2003	→	2005	→					
(Democratic Republic of the Congo)	Lukikana	Icham Lukikana	32	MF					2005						
(Democratic Republic of the Congo)	Lukose	Lukose Mandika	31	DF							→	2008	2009	→	
(Angola)	Mabiná	José Pedro Alberto	22				2003		2005	→					
(Angola)	Macabi						2003		2005						
(Angola)	Man Sapas	Paulino dos Santos Manuel	–	FW								2008	2009	–	↑
(Angola)	Manaja	Gilberto Armindo Cange	25	DF							29				
(Angola)	Manucho Gonçalves	Mateus Alberto Contreiras Gonçalves	20	FW			2003								
(Angola)	Manucho Martins	Faustino Alberto Martins	–	MF										–	↑
(Angola)	Marcelo						2003								
(Democratic Republic of the Congo)	Masiala	Masiala Nguvulo Samuel		MF					→	2006					
(Democratic Republic of the Congo)	Master			GK					2005						
(Angola)	Mauro Gomes	Manuel Lourenço Gomes		FW						→	23	→			
(Democratic Republic of the Congo)	Mbala	Kita Lucien Mbala	31	DF			2003		2005	2006	5	2008			
(Angola)	Micha	Domingos Famoroso Ribeiro		DF					2005	2006	30	→			
(Angola)	Michel Domingos	Miguel Gilberto Manuel Domingos		DF					2005	→					
(Angola)	Muanza		19	GK								2008			
(Angola)	Mussumari, Gabriel	Gabriel Frederico Mussumari	–	DF										4	↑
(Angola)	Nato Faial	Pedro Renato Faial		FW				→	2005	2006	9	→			
(Angola)	Ndó	António Nenuele Nelo	–	MF					2005			→	2009	17	↑
(Angola)	Nelo						2003								
(Angola)	Nelson Chiminha	Nelson Chiminha		FW					2005						
(Portugal)	Oliveira, António	António Manuel Silva Oliveira	–	MF									2009	–	↑
(Angola)	Olívio	Olívio Mendonça Luciano	–	DF					2005		→	2008	2009	–	↑
(Angola)	Paíto Fernandes	Manuel Gaspar Fernandes	–	MF			2003		2005	2006	18	→			
(Angola)	Paulito Fuxe	Paulo Quental Fuxe	26	DF	2001				2005	→					
(Angola)	Pelinganga			MF							–	2008			
(Angola)	Pilola	José Olívio Andrade Pereira	23	FW								2008	→		
(Cape Verde)	Pinha	Plínio Osvaldo Fonseca Brito	36	FW			2003								
(Angola)	Raúl						2003								
(Angola)	Rogério						2003								
(Republic of the Congo)	Romeo	Roméo Gautier Ayessa	26	FW									→	–	
(Angola)	Salú	Salustino Mucuambe Camilo Cachicote	–	MF								→	2009	29	↑
(Angola)	Sanches	Paulo Sanches Octávio	30	DF					2005	2006	3	2008			
(Democratic Republic of the Congo)	Sérge	Serge Mputu-Bandu Mbungu	28						2005	2006	15	2008			
(Angola)	Silo	Silo Lowa Perino Lamba	24	MF								→	2009	→	
(Angola)	Tchitchi	Cláudio Joaquim P. Segundo Adão	–	MF								→	2009	24	↑
(Angola)	Toizinho Silva	António José Pereira da Silva		DF					→	2006					
(Democratic Republic of the Congo)	Tokala	Paulin Tokala Kombe	26	GK			2003	→							
(Angola)	Totó	Osvaldo Cornélio Paulo Candeia	–	MF					2005	2006	10	2008	2009	14	↑
(Angola)	Tucho	Edson Orlando A. Stok Cardoso	19	FW								→	2009	→	
(Angola)	Vado Dias	Dorivaldo António Dias	–	FW					2005	2006	24	2008	2009	18	→
(Angola)	Vicente													–	
(Angola)	Zé Kalanga	Paulo Baptista Nsimba	20	MF			2003	→							
(Angola)	Zé Trindade	Josué dos Anjos Romeu Trindade	–	DF										–	↑
(Angola)	Zinho, Agostinho	Agostinho Politano Francisco													
Years					2001	2002	2003	2004	2005	2006	2007	2008	2009	2010	

== 1991–2000 ==
Saneamento Rangol / S.L. Benfica (Luanda) players 1996–2000

Nat	Nick	Name	A	P	Z.A.					
Nat	Nick	Name	A	P	1994	1996	1997	1998	1999	2000
Nat	Nick	Name	A	P	–	–	–	–	–	–
(Angola)	Aguião				1994			1998		
(Angola)	Bebé							1998		
(Angola)	Berna			MF	1994					
(Angola)	Beto Carmelino								1999	
(Democratic Republic of the Congo)	Blanchard	João Ntinu Pedro	28	FW					1999	2000
(Angola)	Bruno				1994					
(Angola)	Chicangala	André Chicangala	22	FW				1998		
(Angola)	Dicas				1994				1999	
(Angola)	Escurinho								1999	
(Angola)	Esquerdinha								1999	
(Angola)	Gil			GK						2000
(Angola)	João Pio			MF	1994					
(Angola)	Joaquim								1999	
(Angola)	Jonas			DF	1994					
(Angola)	Jorge								1999	
(Angola)	Kikas	Francisco Caetano Monteiro de Assis	–	DF					1999	
(Angola)	Lilí			DF	1994					
(Angola)	Macabi							1998	1999	
(Angola)	Marcelo			DF	1994				1999	2000
(Angola)	Master	José Pascoal Vidal						1998		
(Angola)	Mbala							1999		
(Democratic Republic of the Congo)	Mbiyavanga	Mbiyavanga Kapela	23	MF					1999	
(Angola)	Miranda							1998		
(Angola)	Mukissa							1998	1999	
(Angola)	Nelson			FW	1994					
(Angola)	Rabolé							1998	1999	2000
(Angola)	Santos								1999	
(Angola)	Sebinhas	Sebastião Manuel	23	MF	1994				1999	
(Angola)	Tchibuabua							1998	1999	
(Angola)	Toy			DF	1994					
(Angola)	Victor								1999	
(Angola)	Virgílio			GK	1994				1999	
(Angola)	Yombo	António Domingos do Amaral						1998		
(Angola)	Zadi							1998		
(Angola)	Zatula			DF	1994					

== See also ==
- Category:S.L. Benfica (Luanda) players
