= 2014 Angola Cup =

Tournament details
- Country: Angola
- Dates: 21 Jun - 23 Nov 2014
- Teams: 23

Final positions
- Champions: Benfica de Luanda
- Runners-up: Petro de Luanda
- Confederation Cup: Benfica Luanda (winner); Petro Luanda (runner-up)

The 2014 Taça de Angola was the 33rd edition of the Taça de Angola, the second most important and the top knock-out football club competition in Angola, following the Girabola. Benfica de Luanda beat defending champions Petro de Luanda 1–0 in the final to secure its first title.

The winner and the runner-up qualified to the 2015 CAF Confederation Cup.

== Stadiums and locations ==
Locations of the 2014 Angola Cup teams

P	Team	Home city	Stadium	Capacity	2013	Current	P
5	4 de Abril	Menongue	Campo Municipal	5,000	DNP	R16	n/a
6	Académica do Soyo	Soyo	Estádio dos Imbondeiros	10,000	R16	PR	▼1
5	ASA	Luanda	Estádio da Cidadela	60,000	PR	R16	▲1
1	Benfica de Luanda	Luanda	Estádio dos Coqueiros	8,000	QF	Champion	▲3
6	Benfica do Lubango	Lubango	N.Sra do Monte	14,000	DNP	PR	n/a
5	Bravos do Maquis	Luena	Estádio Mundunduleno	4,300	QF	R16	▼1
6	Construtores do Uíge	Uíge	Estádio 4 de Janeiro	12,000	DNP	PR	n/a
4	Desportivo da Huíla	Lubango	Estádio do Ferrovia	15,000	Runner-Up	QF	▼2
6	Domant FC	Caxito	Municipal do Dande	5,000	DNP	PR	n/a
5	Interclube	Luanda	Estádio 22 de Junho	7,000	SF	R16	▼2
6	Jackson Garcia	Benguela	Estádio de S. Filipe	6,000	DNP	PR	n/a
3	Kabuscorp	Luanda	Estádio dos Coqueiros	8,000	R16	SF	▲2
2	Petro de Luanda	Luanda	Estádio 11 de Novembro	50,000	Champion	Runner-Up	▼1
6	Polivalentes FC	Luanda	Estádio dos Coqueiros	8,000	DNP	PR	n/a
5	Porcelana FC	N'dalatando	Municipal Santos Diniz	5,000	R16	R16	Steady
4	Primeiro de Agosto	Luanda	Estádio 11 de Novembro	50,000	R16	QF	▲1
6	Primeiro de Maio	Benguela	Estádio Edelfride Costa	6,000	PR	PR	Steady
3	Progresso do Sambizanga	Luanda	Estádio dos Coqueiros	8,000	R16	SF	▲2
5	Recreativo da Caála	Caála	Estádio Mártires da Canhala	12,000	SF	R16	▼2
4	Recreativo do Libolo	Calulo	Estádio Municipal de Calulo	10,000	QF	QF	Steady
5	Sagrada Esperança	Dundo	Estádio Sagrada Esperança	8,000	R16	R16	Steady
4	Sporting de Cabinda	Cabinda	Estádio Nacional do Chiazi	25,000	DNP	QF	n/a
6	Talentosos do Pai Djoca	Cabinda	Estádio Nacional do Chiazi	25,000	DNP	PR	n/a
5	União do Uíge	Uíge	Estádio 4 de Janeiro	12,000	DNP	R16	n/a

== Championship bracket ==
Preliminary Rounds; Sat/Sun, 21/22 Jun 2014
Bravos do Maquis (bye)
Sat, 21 Jun 2014
Jackson Garcia	1
Benfica Luanda	2
Desp da Huíla (bye)
Interclube (bye)
Rec da Caála (bye)
Kabuscorp (bye)
Sat, 21 Jun 2014
Porcelana FC	1
1º de Maio	0
1º de Agosto (bye)
Sun, 22 Jun 2014
Polivalentes	1
União do Uíge	3
Sun, 22 Jun 2014
Progresso	2
Académica Soyo	1
Sun, 22 Jun 2014
Sporting Cabinda	4
Construtores	1
Sun, 22 Jun 2014
ASA	4
Domant FC	1
Sun, 22 Jun 2014
Talentosos Pai Djock	0
Sagrada Esperança	6
Rec do Libolo (bye)
Petro Luanda (bye)
Sun, 22 Jun 2014
Benfica Lubango	0
4 de Abril	1

1/16 Finals; Sat, 19 Jul 2014
Wed, 23 Jul 2014
Bravos do Maquis	0
Benfica Luanda	1
Sat, 19 Jul 2014
Desportivo Huíla	2
Interclube	1
Sun, 20 Jul 2014
Rec da Caála	0
Kabuscorp	1
Sat, 19 Jul 2014
Porcelana FC	0
1º de Agosto	4
Sat, 19 Jul 2014 (pen)
União do Uíge	2
Progresso	4
Sat, 19 Jul 2014
Sporting Cabinda	1
ASA	0
Sat, 19 Jul 2014
Sagrada Esperança	0
Rec do Libolo	2
Sun, 20 Jul 2014
Petro Luanda	5
4 de Abril	2

Quarterfinals; Sat, 16 Aug 2014
Sat, 16 Aug 2014
Benfica de Luanda	1
Desportivo da Huíla	0
Sat, 16 Aug 2014 (pen)
Kabuscorp	3
1º de Agosto	2
Sat, 16 Aug 2014
Sporting Cabinda	0
Progresso	1
Mon, 18 Aug 2014
Rec do Libolo	0
Petro Luanda	1

Semifinals; Wed, 1 Oct 2014
Wed, 1 Oct 2014
Kabuscorp	0
Benfica de Luanda	2
Wed, 1 Oct 2014
Progresso Sambizanga	0
Petro de Luanda	2

Final; Sun, 23 Nov 2014
Sun, 23 Nov 2014 (a.e.t.)
Benfica de Luanda	1
Petro de Luanda	0

== Preliminary rounds ==
Sat, 21 Jun 2014 R32	Jackson Garcia	1–2	Benfica Luanda	Benguela
15:00 WAT (UTC+1)		Report		Stadium: Estádio Municipal

Sat, 21 Jun 2014 R32	Porcelana FC	1–0	1º de Maio	Ndalatando
15:00 WAT (UTC+1)	P. Henriques (yellow card) (goal) 87'	Report	(yellow card) Makuntima	Stadium: Santos Diniz; Attendance: 2.000; Referee: Francisco Mazale; Pedro Futa, Tomás Lima

Sun, 22 Jun 2014 R32	Polivalentes FC	1–3	União do Uíge	Luanda
15:00 WAT (UTC+1)				Stadium: Coqueiros

Sun, 22 Jun 2014 R32	Progresso	2–1	Académica Soyo	Luanda
15:00 WAT (UTC+1)				Stadium: Estádio da Cidadela

Sun, 22 Jun 2014 R32	Sporting Cabinda	4–1	Construtores	Cabinda
15:00 WAT (UTC+1)				Stadium: Estádio do Tafe

Sun, 22 Jun 2014 R32	ASA	4–1	Domant FC	Luanda
15:00 WAT (UTC+1)				Stadium: Estádio da Cidadela

Sun, 22 Jun 2014 R32	Talentosos do Pai D'Jock	0–6	Sagrada Esperança	Cabinda
15:00 WAT (UTC+1)

Sun, 22 Jun 2014 R32	Benfica Lubango	0–1	4 de Abril	Lubango
15:00 WAT (UTC+1)	Finidi (yellow card) 58'; Mazowa (yellow card) 70'	Report	24' Nelo; (red card) 65' Chicklay; (red card) 85' Oseias	Stadium: 11 de Novembro; Attendance: 1.000; Referee: António Dungula; Tito Capingala, José Silyia

== Round of 16 ==
Wed, 23 Jul 2014 R16	Bravos do Maquis	0–1	Benfica Luanda	Luena
15:00 WAT (UTC+1)			75' Vado	Stadium: Mundunduleno; Attendance: 3.000; Referee: Osvaldo Félix; Júlio Lemos, João Félix

Sat, 19 Jul 2014 R16	Desportivo Huíla	2–1	Interclube	Lubango
15:00 WAT (UTC+1)	Bena 18' 48'; Jiresse (yellow card) 43'	Report	32' Fabrício	Stadium: Estádio da Tundavala; Attendance: 3.000; Referee: António Cachala; Inácio Cândido, Rosário Pascoal

Sun, 20 Jul 2014 R16	Rec da Caála	0–1	Kabuscorp	Caála
15:00 WAT (UTC+1)	Cassoma (yellow card)	Report	30' Meyong; (yellow card) Matampi; (yellow card) Nuno	Stadium: Mártires da Canhala; Attendance: 7.800; Referee: Benjamim Andrade; Pedro Canombo, Bernabel Ngulo

Sat, 19 Jul 2014 R16	Porcelana FC	0–4	1º de Agosto	Ndalatando
15:00 WAT (UTC+1)	Oné (yellow card); Kaká (yellow card); Barese (yellow card)	Report	63' (yellow card) Mateus; 78' 86' Buá; 90' Gelson	Stadium: Santos Diniz; Attendance: 7.000; Referee: Paulo Talaia; Ricardo Cochicumi, Joaquim Chiyo

Sat, 19 Jul 2014 R16	União do Uíge	0–0 (a.e.t.) (2–4 p)	Progresso	Uíge
15:00 WAT (UTC+1)	Ilonga (yellow card) 19'	Report		Stadium: 4 de Janeiro; Attendance: 5.000; Referee: João Goma; Luís Sá-Miranda, Orlando Pimenta
	Penalties
	Locó (penalty scored); Diavita (penalty scored); Tshukuma (penalty missed); Victor (penalty missed)		(penalty scored) Delmiro; (penalty scored) Mano; (penalty scored) Milambo; (penalty scored) Duba

Sat, 19 Jul 2014 R16	Sporting Cabinda	1–0	ASA	Cabinda
15:30 WAT (UTC+1)				Stadium: Estádio do Tafe

Sat, 19 Jul 2014 R16	Sagrada Esperança	0–2	Rec do Libolo	Dundo
15:00 WAT (UTC+1)		Report	35' (yellow card) 76' Gomito; (yellow card) 57' Diawara; 86' Pedrito	Stadium: Sagrada Esperança; Attendance: 4.000; Referee: Inácio Rangel; Jerson Emiliano, Wilson Tyamba

Sun, 20 Jul 2014 R16	Petro Luanda	5–2	4 de Abril	Luanda
16:00 WAT (UTC+1)	Manguxi 3' 27' 29'; Gilberto 10'; Flávio 34'	Report	70' Nelo; 77' Tchube	Stadium: 11 de Novembro; Referee: José Álvaro

== Quarter-finals ==
Sat, 16 Aug 2014 QF	Benfica Luanda	1–0	Desportivo Huíla	Luanda
15:00 WAT (UTC+1)	Jeferson 36'; Totó (yellow card) 59'	Report	(yellow card) 78' Chiquinho	Stadium: Coqueiros; Attendance: 250; Referee: Venâncio de Matos; Ricardo Daniel, José Sílvio

Sat, 16 Aug 2014 QF	Kabuscorp	0–0 (a.e.t.) (3–2 p)	1º de Agosto	Luanda
15:00 WAT (UTC+1)	Breco (yellow card) 26'; Adawa (yellow card) 40'	Report		Stadium: Cidadela; Attendance: 20.000
	Penalties
	Adawa (penalty scored); Lunguinha (penalty scored); Meyong (penalty scored); Love (penalty missed); Dr. Lami (penalty missed)		(penalty scored) Guilherme; (penalty scored) Buá; (penalty missed) Amaro; (penalty missed) Ary Papel; (penalty missed) Fissy

Sat, 16 Aug 2014 QF	Sporting Cabinda	0–1	Progresso	Cabinda
15:00 WAT (UTC+1)			Duba	Stadium: Estádio do Tafe

Mon, 18 Aug 2014 QF	Rec do Libolo	0–1	Petro Luanda	Calulo
15:00 WAT (UTC+1)			80' Keita	Stadium: Municipal de Calulo

== Semi-finals ==
Wed, 1 Oct 2014 SF	Kabuscorp	0–2	Benfica Luanda	Luanda
15:00 WAT (UTC+1)	Breco (yellow card) 81'	Report	(yellow card) 35' Miguel; (yellow card) 60' Manú; 68' Eric; 90+4' Vado	Stadium: Coqueiros; Attendance: 5.000; Referee: Venâncio de Matos; José Silia, Judite Mestre

Wed, 1 Oct 2014 SF	Progresso	0–2	Petro Luanda	Luanda
15:00 WAT (UTC+1)		Report	70' Nari; 73' Keita; (yellow card) Osório	Stadium: Cidadela; Attendance: 10.000; Referee: João Ngoma; Luís Sá Miranda, Orlando Pimenta

== Final ==
Sun, 23 November 2014
17:00

Benfica de Luanda	1–0 (a.e.t.)	Petro de Luanda
Braga 90+24'	Report

Estádio 11 de Novembro, Luanda
Attendance: 20,000
Referee: Osvaldo Félix

Benfica	Petro

GK	1	(Angola) Elber
RB	30	(Angola) Lírio
CB	4	(Angola) Debele
CB	5	(Brazil) Jeferson
LB	23	(Angola) Dedé
RM	6	(Cameroon) Jean-Claude	(yellow card) 90+2'
CM	10	(Portugal) Oliveira
CM	26	(Mozambique) Manú Lopes (c)
LM	14	(Angola) Vado		(substituted off) 66'
CF	7	(Democratic Republic of the Congo) Eric	(yellow card) 70'	(substituted off) 90+27'
CF	25	(Angola) Pedro		(substituted off) 90+27'
Substitutions:
MF	20	(Portugal) Braga	(yellow card) 90+24'	(substituted on) 66'
MF	27	(Angola) Rasca		(substituted on) 90+27'
DF	18	(Angola) Castro		(substituted on) 90+27'
Manager:
(Angola) Zeca Amaral

GK	12	(Angola) Jotabé
RB	13	(Angola) Isaac	(yellow card) 88'
CB	15	(Portugal) Borges
CB	27	(Angola) Vado
LB	24	(Angola) Mira
RM	11	(Angola) Job		(substituted off) 90+20'
CM	8	(Angola) Chara (c)
CM	10	(Angola) Manguxi
LM	27	(Angola) Nari		(substituted off) 90+22'
CF	16	(Angola) Flávio		(substituted off) 78'
CF	19	(Senegal) Ben Traoré
Substitutions:
FW	32	(Angola) Filhão		(substituted on) 78'
MF	14	(Angola) Mateus		(substituted on) 90+20'
MF	5	(Angola) Osório		(substituted on) 90+22'
Manager:
(Brazil) Alexandre Grasseli

Assistant referees:
José Félix
Rosário Pedro

2014 Angola Football Cup winner

1st title

Squad:
Elber, Kizamba, Wilson (GK)
Debele, Dedé, Hélder, Jeferson, Lírio, Miguel, Vado II (DF)
Bota, Braga, Castro, Diakité, Jean-Claude, Manu Lopes, Minguito, Oliveira, Totó (MF)
Eric, Massinga, Paizinho, Pedro, Pires, Rasca, Vado (FW)
Zeca Amaral (Head Coach)

== See also ==
- 2014 Girabola
- 2015 Angola Super Cup
- 2015 CAF Confederation Cup
- Benfica de Luanda players
- Petro de Luanda players
