= Gregory Mertens =

Belgian footballer (1991-2015)

- Mertens while at Lokeren in 2014

Personal information
- Full name: Gregory Mertens
- Date of birth: 2 February 1991
- Place of birth: Anderlecht, Belgium
- Date of death: 30 April 2015 (aged 24)
- Place of death: Genk, Belgium
- Position: Defender

Youth career
- 2004–2005: Anderlecht
- 2005–2006: Dilbeek Sport
- 2006–2010: Gent
- 2010–2011: Cercle Brugge

Senior career*
Years	Team	Apps	(Gls)
2011–2014	Cercle Brugge	73	(5)
2014–2015	Lokeren	28	(0)
Total		101	(5)

International career
2006	Belgium U16	1	(0)
2009–2010	Belgium U19	5	(1)
2011	Belgium U21	7	(1)
- * Club domestic league appearances and goals

Gregory Mertens (2 February 1991 – 30 April 2015) was a Belgian professional football player. His usual position was central defender. He began his senior career with Cercle Brugge and was under contract with Lokeren before he suffered a fatal cardiac arrest during a reserve game in 2015.

== Career ==
Mertens moved from the reserves of K.A.A. Gent to the first team of Cercle Brugge in the 2010–11 winter transfer window, at the recommendation of manager Bob Peeters, who had been his coach at the Gent reserves the previous season.

On 12 February 2011, Mertens made his senior debut for Cercle as an 89th-minute substitute for Hans Cornelis in a match against his former team R.S.C. Anderlecht. Cercle lost the match 1–0.

On 23 May 2013, he scored his first hat trick against WS Woluwe.

== Death ==
Mertens suffered a cardiac arrest during a reserve game for Lokeren against K.R.C. Genk on 27 April 2015. He was immediately taken to hospital where he was put in an artificially induced coma. He died on 30 April 2015 at around 16:30. Lokeren declared that Mertens had passed all fitness tests set by UEFA, and therefore the cause of his cardiac arrest needed to be established.

On the day after his death, Lokeren lined up for their play-off match against Westerlo in T-shirts bearing Mertens' name and squad number 4.

== Honours ==
Lokeren

- Belgian Cup: 2013–14

== See also ==
- List of association footballers who died while playing
- List of association footballers who died during their careers
