= Juan Pablo Rial =

Argentine footballer

Personal information
- Date of birth: 17 October 1984 (age 42)
- Place of birth: Buenos Aires, Argentina
- Height: 1.74 m (5 ft 8 1/2 in)
- Position: Striker

Senior career*
Years	Team	Apps	(Gls)
2008–2009	Platense	31	(7)
2009–2010	All Boys	15	(1)
2010–2011	Platense	12	(1)
2011	Charleroi	3	(0)
2011–2012	Temperley		
2012–2014	Juventud Antoniana	20	(5)
2014–2015	Marathón	5	(1)
- * Club domestic league appearances and goals as of 12 May 2015

Juan Pablo Rial (born 17 October 1984) is an Argentine professional footballer who last played for Marathón, as a striker.

== Career ==
Rial made his debut for Charleroi in the 2010–11 season, having previously played in his native Argentina for Platense and All Boys.
