= Garry De Graef =

Belgian footballer

Personal information
- Date of birth: 21 October 1974 (age 52)
- Place of birth: Aarschot, Belgium
- Position: Defender

Senior career*
Years	Team	Apps	(Gls)
–1995	Antwerp	7	(0)
1995–1996	Helmond Sport		
1996–1998	TOP Oss	62	(9)
1998–2003	RKC Waalwijk	171	(13)
2003–2005	De Graafschap	62	(4)
2005–2008	SC Paderborn	85	(2)
2008–2011	Lierse	60	(4)
2011	Turnhout	11	(0)
2011–2012	Lierse Kempenzonen		
2012–2014	Houtvenne		
- * Club domestic league appearances and goals

Garry De Graef (born 21 October 1974 in Belgium) is a Belgian retired footballer who last played for Houtvenne in his home country.

== Career ==
De Graef started his senior career with Royal Antwerp. In 2008, he signed for SC Paderborn 07 in the German 2. Bundesliga, where he made eighty-eight appearances and scored two goals. After that, he played for Lierse, Turnhout, Lierse Kempenzonen, and Houtvenne.

== Honours ==
=== Player ===
Royal Antwerp

- UEFA Cup Winners' Cup: 1992-93 (runners-up)
