= Kikas (Angolan footballer) =

Angolan footballer

Personal information
- Full name: Francisco Caetano Monteiro de Assis
- Date of birth: October 21, 1981 (age 45)
- Place of birth: Angola
- Position: Defender

Team information
- Current team: Interclube Luanda

International career
Years	Team	Apps	(Gls)
2002–	Angola		

Francisco Caetano Monteiro de Assis also known as Kikas (born October 21, 1981) is an Angolan football player. He has played for Angola national team.

== National team statistics ==
Angola national team
Year	Apps	Goals
2002	1	0
2003	0	0
2004	0	0
2005	0	0
2006	0	0
2007	0	0
2008	0	0
2009	3	0
2010	2	0
Total	6	0
