= Julien Tournut =

French footballer (born 1982)

Personal information
- Date of birth: July 2, 1982 (age 44)
- Place of birth: Nancy, France
- Height: 1.90 m (6 ft 3 in)
- Position: Defender

Team information
- Current team: F91 Dudelange
- Number: 2

Youth career
- AS Nancy

Senior career*
Years	Team	Apps	(Gls)
2002–2005	AS Nancy	7	(0)
2005–2006	Yverdon Sports	4	(0)
2006–2007	USL Dunkerque	22	(0)
2007–2008	Red Star Waasland	58	(2)
2009–2011	Lierse	3	(0)
2011	Waasland-Beveren	6	(1)
2011–	F91 Dudelange	20	(1)
- * Club domestic league appearances and goals as of 08:52, 4 July 2014 (UTC)

Julien Tournut (born July 2, 1982) is a French football player. He plays in central defence for Luxembourgish club F91 Dudelange. He also played for AS Nancy (B team), USL Dunkerque and Lierse S.K. in Belgium.
