= Bram Castro =

Belgian footballer

Personal information
- Date of birth: 30 September 1982 (age 44)
- Place of birth: Hasselt, Belgium
- Height: 1.91 m (6 ft 3 in)
- Position: Goalkeeper

Youth career
- 1985–1988: Kortessem VV
- 1988–1991: Liège
- 1991–1992: Tongeren
- 1992–1994: Liège
- 1994–2001: Genk

Senior career*
Years	Team	Apps	(Gls)
2001–2002	Genk	2	(0)
2002–2005	Sint-Truiden	30	(0)
2005–2010	Roda JC	100	(1)
2010–2011	PSV	0	(0)
2011–2012	Sint-Truiden	13	(0)
2012–2014	MVV	71	(0)
2014–2018	Heracles Almelo	118	(0)
2018–2020	Mechelen	11	(0)
2020–2021	Oostende	4	(0)
Total		349	(0)
- * Club domestic league appearances and goals

Bram Castro (born 30 September 1982) is a Belgian former footballer who played as a goalkeeper.

== Club career ==
Castro made his debut in professional football, being part of the RC Genk squad in the 2000–01 season. He also played for Sint-Truidense VV before joining Roda JC.

=== Roda JC ===
At Roda, Castro was the number one goalkeeper for 3 seasons. On 30 October 2007, Castro scored the equalizer (2–2) in the dying seconds of the KNVB Cup 2007-08 third round tie against De Graafschap. Roda JC won the match 3–2 after extra time and would go on to reach the final, losing to Feyenoord. In December 2009 Castro was involved in a fight with fellow team member Anouar Hadouir, who hit Castro in the face. Hadouir was fined by the club but Castro would lose his place between the goalposts soon after and was released by Roda at the end of the season.

On 1 October 2010, Castro joined PSV Eindhoven for the 2010–11 season. After 1 season at PSV Eindhoven he played 1 season for Sint-Truidense VV, 2 seasons for MVV Maastricht and in the summer of the 2014/2015 season he signed a 2 year long deal with Dutch Eredivisie team Heracles Almelo.

== Honours ==
Mechelen

- Belgian Cup: 2018–19
