= Jorge Pires =

Portuguese footballer

Personal information
- Full name: Jorge da Costa Pires
- Date of birth: 1 April 1981 (age 45)
- Place of birth: Amares, Portugal
- Height: 1.78 m (5 ft 10 in)
- Position: Striker

Youth career
- 1992–1998: Braga
- 1998–2000: Amares

Senior career*
Years	Team	Apps	(Gls)
2000–2001	Amares		
2001–2004	Braga B	62	(5)
2004–2005	Portosantense	31	(8)
2005–2006	Amares		
2006–2007	Pontassolense	23	(8)
2007–2008	Ribeirão	37	(26)
2008–2009	Vizela	29	(4)
2009–2011	Portimonense	50	(10)
2011–2012	Aves	28	(12)
2012–2013	Feirense	34	(11)
2013–2014	Moreirense	40	(22)
2014	Benfica Luanda	12	(3)
2015–2019	Portimonense	132	(46)
2018–2019	→ Penafiel (loan)	34	(16)
2019–2020	Penafiel	18	(3)
Total		530	(174)
- * Club domestic league appearances and goals

Jorge da Costa Pires (born 1 April 1981) is a Portuguese former professional footballer who played as a striker.

He spent most of his career in LigaPro, totalling 324 matches and a record 113 goals for six teams and being top scorer three times. Additionally, he played 42 Primeira Liga games and scored 11 goals in two spells with Portimonense.

== Club career ==
Born in Amares, Braga District, Pires spent his youth career with Amares and Braga. He made his senior debut with the former in the fourth division before moving into the latter's reserve team in the third. He then had brief lower league spells at Portosantense, Amares again, Pontassolense and Ribeirão.

In 2008, Pires joined Vizela of the second level and a year later Portimonense, whom he helped to promotion as runners-up in his first season and then played in Primeira Liga for the first time, his maiden appearance in the competition occurring on 13 August 2010 in a 1–3 away loss against Braga where he came on as a second-half substitute. After their immediate relegation, he spent the next two years in the second tier with Aves and Feirense respectively.

Pires signed for Moreirense in June 2013, and was the league's top scorer with 22 goals (one more than Porto B's Tózé) as his team won promotion to the top flight as champions. In June 2014, he moved abroad to join Benfica Luanda. After winning the Taça de Angola, he returned to Portimonense on an 18-month deal in December.

In 2016–17, Pires was again the second division's top scorer with 23 goals as the Algarvean team won the league title, with four more than Gil Vicente's Paulinho. He added seven the following campaign in a tenth-place finish, including a hat-trick in a 4–3 win over former club Moreirense on 31 March 2018 in which the opponents had led 3–0; two of those goals were added-time penalties to win the points.

Pires, who had two years remaining on his contract in Portimão, chose from seven offers to go on loan to Penafiel of the second tier in August 2018. He was again top scorer with 16 goals, joint with Fabrício of Famalicão, and his permanent transfer was subsequently confirmed.

Pires retired on 20 August 2020 at the age of 39, as the highest scorer of all time in his country's second division. He immediately returned to Portimonense, as part of the coaching setup for the under-23 team.

== Honours ==
Moreirense

- Segunda Liga: 2013–14

Portimonense

- LigaPro: 2016–17

Benfica Luanda

- Taça de Angola: 2014

Individual

- LigaPro top scorer: 2013–14, 2016–17, 2018–19 (joint)
