= Roni Porokara =

Finnish footballer (born 1983)

Personal information
- Date of birth: 12 December 1983 (age 42)
- Place of birth: Helsinki, Finland
- Height: 1.85 m (6 ft 1 in)
- Position: Winger

Youth career
- FinnPa
- Allianssi
- Jokerit
- Klubi-04

Senior career*
Years	Team	Apps	(Gls)
2003–2004	Hämeenlinna	49	(6)
2005–2007	Honka	76	(24)
2008–2010	Örebro SK	84	(11)
2010–2012	Beerschot	37	(3)
2012	Ironi Kiryat Shmona	3	(0)
2013–2014	Honka	52	(11)
2014	HJK	4	(1)
2015	Honka	13	(2)
Total		297	(56)

International career
2005	Finland U21	1	(0)
2006–2013	Finland	24	(5)
- * Club domestic league appearances and goals

Roni Porokara (born 12 December 1983) is a Finnish entrepreneur and a former international footballer, who is currently working in a real estate business.

== Club career ==
=== FC Hämeenlinna ===
On 15 May 2003, at age 19, Roni Porokara made his league debut in a match between FC Hämeenlinna and KuPS. During his two-year spell with Hämeenlinna, he made 46 league appearances and scored 6 goals.

=== FC Honka ===
He joined FC Honka in 2005, and played there until the end of 2007, making 76 league appearances and scoring 24 goals.

=== Örebro SK ===
In 2008, Porokara moved to the Swedish Premier Division side Örebro SK staying there until the end of 2010, making 84 league appearances and scoring 11 goals.

At the end of the 2009 Allsvenskan season, after playing for a year in Örebro SK, Porokara entered into negotiations with Israeli clubs, Maccabi Haifa and Maccabi Tel Aviv. Porokara attracted interest from Maccabi Haifa due to his eligibility to receive Israeli citizenship under the law of return. He was set to transfer to Maccabi Haifa in January 2010, for $700,000, but the deal fell through.

In August 2010, Porokara attracted interest from number of clubs in Europe. Wigan Athletic from the Premier League was the big name out of this clubs along with Cesena from Serie A, and a few clubs from Germany, Belgium, and Switzerland. After Örebro finished third in 2010, Porokara announced that he would not renew his contract with the Swedes.

=== Beerschot AC ===
On 3 December 2010 he signed with Beerschot, where he stayed until the summer of 2012, before moving to Ironi Kiryat Shmona in Israel.

=== Back to FC Honka ===
Porokara returned to FC Honka in 2015 after the team was relegated to Kakkonen due to financial problems. After appearing five times and scoring once, Porokara was forced to retire from active football because of a hip problem.

== International career ==
On 13 April 2005, Porokara made his only appearance for the Finnish under-21 side in a friendly match against their Estonian counterparts. His full national team debut came a year later on 25 May 2006 in a friendly against Sweden. Porokara was a late substitute and only got a minute on the pitch.

On 8 November 2010, Porokara scored the winning goal against Belgium in friendly game.

== Career statistics ==
=== Club ===
As of 31 December 2020

Appearances and goals by club, season and competition
Club	Season	League			National cup (Note: Includes Suomen Cup, Svenska Cupen, Belgian Cup and Svenska Cupen)		Other		Continental		Total	
Club	Season	Division	Apps	Goals	Apps	Goals	Apps	Goals	Apps	Goals	Apps	Goals
Hämeenlinna	2003	Veikkausliiga	25	1	–		–		–		25	1
Hämeenlinna	2004	Veikkausliiga	24	5	1	0	–		–		25	5
Hämeenlinna	Total		49	6	1	0	0	0	0	0	50	6
Honka	2004	Ykkönen	26	13	–		–		–		26	13
Honka	2005	Veikkausliiga	24	8	0	0	0	0	–		24	8
Honka	2006	Veikkausliiga	26	3	1	0	0	0	4 (Note: Includes UEFA Intertoto Cup)	2	31	5
Honka	Total		76	24	1	0	0	0	4	2	81	26
Örebro	2008	Allsvenskan	29	2	–		–		–		29	2
Örebro	2009	Allsvenskan	29	5	1	0	–		–		30	5
Örebro	2010	Allsvenskan	26	3	–		–		–		26	3
Örebro	Total		84	10	1	0	0	0	0	0	85	10
Beerschot	2010–11	Belgian Pro League	12	0	1	0	–		–		13	0
Beerschot	2011–12	Belgian Pro League	25	3	3	0	–		–		28	3
Beerschot	Total		37	3	4	0	0	0	0	0	41	3
Ironi Kiryat Shmona	2012–13	Israeli Premier League	3	0	0	0	–		2 (Note: Includes UEFA Europa League)	0	5	0
Honka	2013	Veikkausliiga	27	3	1	0	–		2	0	30	3
Honka	2014	Veikkausliiga	25	8	0	0	5 (Note: Includes Finnish League Cup)	2	2	1	32	11
Honka	Total		52	11	1	0	5	2	4	1	62	14
HJK	2014	Veikkausliiga	4	1	–		–		3	0	7	1
Honka	2015	Kakkonen	13	2	3	4	–		–		16	6
Career total			318	57	11	4	5	2	13	3	347	66

=== International ===
Appearances and goals by national team and year
National team	Year	Apps	Goals
Finland	2008	3	0
Finland	2009	5	2
Finland	2010	9	2
Finland	2011	2	1
Finland	2012	2	0
Finland	2013	1	0
Total		22	5

=== International goals ===
Updated 12 December 2009

Goal	Date	Venue	Opponent	Score	Result	Competition	Reports
1.	2 February 2009	Olympic Stadium, Tokyo	Japan	1–3	1–5	Friendly match	
2.	10 October 2009	Olympic Stadium, Helsinki	Wales	1–0	2–1	FIFA World Cup 2010 qualifying	
3.	11 August 2010	Veritas Stadion, Turku	Belgium	1-0	1-0	Friendly	
4.	17 November 2010	Olympic Stadium, Helsinki	San Marino	7-0	8-0	UEFA Euro 2012 qualifying	
5.	9 February 2011	Jules Ottenstadion, Ghent	Belgium	1-1	1-1	Friendly	

== Honours ==
'FC Honka

- Ykkönen: 2005

HJK

- Veikkausliiga: 2014

Individual

- BV Cup Player of the Tournament: 2006
- Veikkausliiga All-Star Team: 2006

== See also ==
- List of select Jewish football (association; soccer) players
