= Chris Janssens =

Belgian footballer

Personal information
- Full name: Christiaan Janssens
- Date of birth: 12 June 1969 (age 57)
- Place of birth: Lier, Belgium
- Height: 1.90 m (6 ft 3 in)
- Position: Defender

Youth career
- Kessel FC
- FC Rita Berlaar
- FC Heist Sportief

Senior career*
| Years | Team | Apps | (Gls) |
| 1995–1996 | Sint Niklaas | | |
| 1996–2001 | Lokeren | 150 | (41) |
| 2001–2003 | Willem II | 59 | (5) |
| 2003–2006 | Westerlo | 92 | (18) |
| 2006 | Zulte Waregem | 12 | (0) |
| 2007–2009 | Lierse | 60 | (6) |

International career
| 1998–1999 | Belgium | 7 | (0) |

Managerial career
- 2008–2009: Lierse (playing assistant)
- 2009–2011: Lierse (assistant)
- 2011–2012: Lierse
- 2013–2014: Eendracht Aalst
- 2014: FCV Dender EH
- 2014–2015: KV Oostende (technical director)
- 2015–2016: Cercle Brugge (assistant)
- 2016–2017: Lierse (assistant)
- 2017–2018: Dender
- 2018–2019: Tempo Overijse
- 2019–2021: Destelbergen
- 2021–: Lokeren-Temse
- * Club domestic league appearances and goals

Chris Janssens (born 12 June 1969) is a Belgian football manager and former player.
