= Pedro Bengui =

Angolan footballer

Personal information
- Full name: Pedro Bengui
- Date of birth: 2 March 1993 (age 33)
- Place of birth: Angola
- Height: 1.85 m (6 ft 1 in)
- Position: Attacking midfielder

Youth career
- Benfica de Luanda

Senior career*
Years	Team	Apps	(Gls)
2012–2016	Benfica de Luanda		
2016	AEL Limassol	0	(0)
2017	Luftëtari	8	(1)
2018	Interclube	18	(7)

International career
2015–	Angola	1	(0)
- * Club domestic league appearances and goals as of 2 September 2018

Pedro Bengui (born 2 March 1993) is an Angolan footballer who plays as a midfielder. He is also a member of the Angola national team.

== External ==
- Pedro Bengui at Soccerway (archived)
- Pedro Bengui at National-Football-Teams.com
