= Kevin Janssens (footballer) =

Belgian footballer (born 1986)

Personal information
- Full name: Kevin Janssens
- Date of birth: 29 May 1986 (age 40)
- Place of birth: Turnhout, Belgium
- Height: 1.85 m (6 ft 1 in)
- Position: Left midfielder

Team information
- Current team: Wezel Sport

Youth career
- 1991–2004: Turnhout

Senior career*
Years	Team	Apps	(Gls)
2004–2008	Turnhout	95	(13)
2008–2011	Lierse	38	(2)
2010–2011	→ Turnhout (loan)	14	(5)
2011–2013	Cercle Brugge	40	(3)
2013–2015	Eendracht Aalst	62	(3)
2015–2020	Dessel Sport	138	(23)
2020–	Wezel Sport		
- * Club domestic league appearances and goals as of 19:37, 4 February 2021 (UTC)

Kevin Janssens (born 29 May 1986 in Turnhout) is a Belgian professional football player, currently playing for Wezel Sport. His best position is left-midfielder.

== Career ==
He made his senior debut for K.V. Turnhout in third division, and was transferred to second division team Lierse in December 2008. He achieved promotion with Lierse to the highest level in 2010, but was quickly loaned out to his former club Turnhout, who had also achieved promotion in 2010. With Turnhout, Janssens was relegated back to third division but received a new chance at the highest level of Belgian football when he signed a 2-year deal with Cercle Brugge. In 2013, he signed for Belgian Second Division team SC Eendracht Aalst.
