= Manuel de Jesus Lopes =

Mozambican footballer (born 1982)

Manú
Personal information
- Full name: Manuel de Jesus Lopes
- Date of birth: August 19, 1982 (age 44)
- Place of birth: Maputo, Mozambique
- Height: 1.78 m (5 ft 10 in)
- Position: Midfielder

Youth career
- 2001–2002: Santana

Senior career*
Years	Team	Apps	(Gls)
2002–2006	A.D. Camacha	91	(4)
2006–2007	Beroe Stara Zagora	22	(1)
2007–2010	Panthrakikos F.C.	75	(2)
2009	→ Panetolikos F.C. (loan)	13	(1)
2011	APOP Kinyras Peyias	8	(0)
2019–	F.C. Bergen 2	7	(2)

International career^{‡}
2008	Mozambique	2	(0)
- * Club domestic league appearances and goals as of 26 March 2011 ‡ National team caps and goals as of 2008

Manuel de Jesus Lopes (born August 19, 1982) is a Mozambican footballer.

== Career ==
Career statistics

season	club	league	Championship		Nation cup		Europe cup		Total	
season	club	league	appear	goals	appear	goals	appear	goals	appear	goals
2001–02	Santana FC	?	?	?	0	0	0	0	?	?
2002–03	Camacha	?	?	?	0	0	0	0	?	?
2003–04	Camacha	?	30	1	0	0	0	0	30	1
2004–05	Camacha	?	38	3	0	0	0	0	38	3
2005–06	Camacha	?	23	0	0	0	0	0	23	0
2006–07	Beroe	A Liga	22	1	0	0	0	0	22	1
2007–08	Panthrakikos	Beta Ethniki	22	0	0	0	0	0	22	0
2008–09	Panthrakikos	Super League	24	0	0	0	0	0	24	0
2009	Panetolikos	Beta Ethniki	13	0	2	1	0	0	15	1
2010	Panthrakikos	Super League	13	1	0	0	0	0	13	1
2010–11	Panthrakikos	Beta Ethniki	0	0	0	0	0	0	0	0
career total			185	6	2	1	0	0	187	7

Last update: 27 June 2010
