= Jeroen Vanthournout =

Belgian footballer

Personal information
- Date of birth: 29 June 1989 (age 37)
- Place of birth: Belgium
- Height: 1.83 m (6 ft 0 in)
- Position: Defensive midfielder

Team information
- Current team: SK Oostnieuwkerke

Youth career
- 1995–2000: KM Torhout
- 2000–2005: Roeselare
- 2005–2006: Gent
- 2006–2008: Roeselare

Senior career*
Years	Team	Apps	(Gls)
2007–2011	Roeselare	33	(2)
2011–2014	Westerlo	66	(4)
2014–2016	Roeselare	53	(2)
2016–2017	Sint-Eloois-Winkel		
2017–2018	Dender EH		
2018–2019	KVC Wingene		
2019–	SK Oostnieuwkerke		
- * Club domestic league appearances and goals as of 13:09, 4 November 2019 (UTC)

Jeroen Vanthournout (born 29 June 1989) is a Belgian professional footballer who currently plays for SK Oostnieuwkerke in the Belgian First Amateur Division.
