= Alain Muana Kizamba =

Democratic Republic of the Congo footballer

Alain Muana Kizamba (born November 10, 1980), is a goalkeeper from the Democratic Republic of the Congo. He played in DC Motema Pembe and has played for DR Congo national team. In 2006, he was transferred from DC Motema Pembe to Sport Luanda e Benfica.

Kizamba helped Benfica reach the final of the 2007 Angolan Cup.
