= Alpha Bâ =

Senegalese footballer

Personal information
- Full name: Alpha Bâ
- Date of birth: 28 May 1989 (age 37)
- Place of birth: Senegal
- Height: 1.89 m (6 ft 2 in)
- Position: Defender

Team information
- Current team: ASC Diaraf

Senior career*
Years	Team	Apps	(Gls)
2007–2010	US Ouakam	?	(?)
2010–2012	KAA Gent	6	(0)
2012–2014	US Ouakam	?	(?)
2014–2015	HB Køge	4	(0)
2017–	ASC Diaraf	?	(?)

International career
2010	Senegal	3	(0)
- * Club domestic league appearances and goals

Alpha Bâ (born 28 May 1989) is a Senegalese football player, who most recently played for ASC Diaraf in the Senegal Premier League.

== Career ==
Alpha Bâ began his career with US Ouakam. He got a contract with K.A.A. Gent in Belgium in the winter of 2010/11.

On 20 August 2014 he signed a contract with HB Køge in the Danish 1st Division.
