= Grégory Dufer =

Belgian footballer

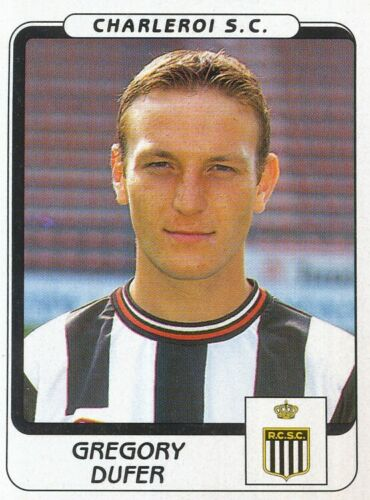
- Dufer in 2001

Personal information
- Full name: Grégory Dufer
- Date of birth: 19 December 1981 (age 44)
- Place of birth: Charleroi, Belgium
- Height: 1.75 m (5 ft 9 in)
- Position: Right winger

Youth career
- RFCS Marcinelle

Senior career*
Years	Team	Apps	(Gls)
1999–2004	Charleroi	138	(21)
2004–2005	Caen	21	(1)
2005–2007	Club Brugge	21	(2)
2007	Lokeren	12	(1)
2007–2010	Standard Liège	22	(1)
2008–2009	→ Tubize (loan)	26	(6)
2011–2014	Sint-Truiden	74	(20)
2014–2015	Seraing United	31	(15)
2015–2016	Antwerp	25	(7)
2016–2017	RFC Liège	?	(?)

International career
1998–1999	Belgium U18	10	(2)
2000–2003	Belgium U21	19	(3)
2004	Belgium	4	(1)
- * Club domestic league appearances and goals

Grégory Dufer (born 19 December 1981) is a Belgian former international footballer.

== Honours ==
Club Brugge

- Belgian Super Cup: 2005

Standard Liège

- Belgian Super Cup: 2009
