= Eric Bokanga =

Congolese international footballer

Personal information
- Full name: Eric Bokanga Musau
- Date of birth: 9 October 1989 (age 37)
- Place of birth: Kinshasa, Zaire
- Height: 1.80 m (5 ft 11 in)
- Position: Striker

Team information
- Current team: AS Vita Club

Senior career*
Years	Team	Apps	(Gls)
2005–2007	JAC Trésor		
2008	Benfica de Luanda		
2009	AS Vita Club		
2009–2010	APR		
2010–2011	Standard Liège	13	(1)
2011	Benfica de Luanda		
2011–2014	TP Mazembe		
2014	Benfica de Luanda	8	(2)
2015	Progresso do Sambizanga	1	(0)
2016	Benfica de Luanda	3	(0)
2016–2017	FC Renaissance		
2018	Progresso	6	(1)
2018	Bravos Maquis	9	(1)
2018	Progresso do Sambizanga		
2018–2019	Interclube		
2020–	AS Vita Club		

International career^{‡}
2009–2013	Congo DR	9	(1)
- * Club domestic league appearances and goals as of 2 September 2018 ‡ National team caps and goals as of 08:56, 3 April 2018 (UTC)

Eric Bokanga Musau (born 9 October 1989) is a Congolese international footballer who plays as a striker for AS Vita Club.

== Club career ==
Born in Kinshasa, Bokanga has played in the Congo DR for JAC Trésor and AS Vita Club, in Angola for Benfica de Luanda and in Rwanda for APR.

After playing 13 times for Belgian club Standard Liège during the 2010–11 season, Bokanga was released by them in January 2011, returning briefly to play for Benfica de Luanda, before returning to the Congo in March 2011 to play for TP Mazembe. He later played for Benfica de Luanda (twice), Progresso do Sambizanga and FC Renaissance.

In 2018, he played for Progresso Sambizanga and later in the season transferred to F.C. Bravos do Maquis. After spells at Progresso do Sambizanga and Interclube, Bokanga returned to AS Vita Club in Congo.

== International career ==
Bokanga made his international debut for Congo DR in 2009.
