= 2025–26 Liverpool F.C. season =

English football club season

Liverpool
2025–26 season
- Owner: Fenway Sports Group
- Chairman: Tom Werner
- Head coach: Arne Slot
- Stadium: Anfield
- Premier League: 5th
- FA Cup: Quarter-finals
- EFL Cup: Fourth round
- FA Community Shield: Runners-up
- UEFA Champions League: Quarter-finals
- Top goalscorer: League: Hugo Ekitike (11); All: Hugo Ekitike (17)
- Highest home attendance: 60,466 (v. Wolverhampton Wanderers, Premier League, 27 December 2025)
- Lowest home attendance: 59,507 (v. Atlético Madrid, UEFA Champions League, 17 September 2025)
- Average home league attendance: 60,389
- Biggest win: 6–0 v. Qarabağ (H); UEFA Champions League, 28 January 2026
- Biggest defeat: 0–4 v. Manchester City (A); FA Cup, 4 April 2026
Home colours	Away colours	Third colours

The 2025–26 season was Liverpool Football Club's 134th overall and their 64th consecutive season in the top flight of English football. In addition to the domestic league, the club also participated in the FA Cup, the EFL Cup, the FA Community Shield and the UEFA Champions League.

On 30 May 2026, after a 5th place league finish and no silverware, the club announced that head coach Arne Slot had departed his role with immediate effect.

== First-team squad ==
This was the first season since 2015–16 without Trent Alexander-Arnold, the first since 2020–21 without Luis Díaz and the first since 2019–20 without Diogo Jota, who died in a car accident on 3 July 2025. On 11 July 2025, Jota's squad number 20 was retired across all levels in his memory.

No.	Player	Nationality	Date of birth (age)	Signed from	Apps	Goals	Assists
Goalkeepers
1	Alisson Becker	(Brazil)	2 October 1992 (aged 33)	(Italy) Roma	333	1	3
25	Giorgi Mamardashvili	(Georgia (country))	29 September 2000 (aged 25)	(Spain) Valencia	20	0	0
28	Freddie Woodman	(England)	4 March 1997 (aged 29)	(England) Preston North End	4	0	0
41	Ármin Pécsi	(Hungary)	24 February 2005 (aged 21)	(Hungary) Puskás Akadémia	0	0	0
95	Harvey Davies	(England)	3 September 2003 (aged 22)	(England) LFC Academy	0	0	0
Defenders
2	Joe Gomez	(England)	23 May 1997 (aged 29)	(England) Charlton Athletic	274	0	11
4	Virgil van Dijk (captain)	(Netherlands)	8 July 1991 (aged 34)	(England) Southampton	374	36	14
5	Ibrahima Konaté	(France)	25 May 1999 (aged 27)	(Germany) RB Leipzig	183	7	4
6	Milos Kerkez	(Hungary)	7 November 2003 (aged 22)	(England) Bournemouth	48	2	2
12	Conor Bradley	(Northern Ireland)	9 July 2003 (aged 22)	(England) LFC Academy	78	1	12
15	Giovanni Leoni	(Italy)	21 December 2006 (aged 19)	(Italy) Parma	1	0	0
26	Andy Robertson (vice-captain)	(Scotland)	11 March 1994 (aged 32)	(England) Hull City	378	14	69
30	Jeremie Frimpong	(Netherlands)	10 December 2000 (aged 25)	(Germany) Bayer Leverkusen	35	2	1
46	Rhys Williams	(England)	3 February 2001 (aged 25)	(England) LFC Academy	19	0	0
47	Calvin Ramsay	(Scotland)	31 July 2003 (aged 22)	(Scotland) Aberdeen	4	0	0
Midfielders
3	Wataru Endo	(Japan)	9 February 1993 (aged 33)	(Germany) VfB Stuttgart	87	2	2
7	Florian Wirtz	(Germany)	3 May 2003 (aged 23)	(Germany) Bayer Leverkusen	49	7	8
8	Dominik Szoboszlai	(Hungary)	25 October 2000 (aged 25)	(Germany) RB Leipzig	147	28	24
10	Alexis Mac Allister	(Argentina)	24 December 1998 (aged 27)	(England) Brighton & Hove Albion	150	19	20
17	Curtis Jones	(England)	30 January 2001 (aged 25)	(England) LFC Academy	228	22	22
38	Ryan Gravenberch	(Netherlands)	16 May 2002 (aged 24)	(Germany) Bayern Munich	137	10	12
42	Trey Nyoni	(England)	30 June 2007 (aged 19)	(England) LFC Academy	20	0	1
43	Stefan Bajcetic	(Spain)	22 October 2004 (aged 21)	(England) LFC Academy	22	1	0
53	James McConnell	(England)	13 September 2004 (aged 21)	(England) LFC Academy	13	0	1
Forwards
9	Alexander Isak	(Sweden)	21 September 1999 (aged 26)	(England) Newcastle United	22	4	1
11	Mohamed Salah	(Egypt)	15 June 1992 (aged 34)	(Italy) Roma	442	257	120
14	Federico Chiesa	(Italy)	25 October 1997 (aged 28)	(Italy) Juventus	50	5	4
18	Cody Gakpo	(Netherlands)	7 May 1999 (aged 27)	(Netherlands) PSV Eindhoven	180	50	20
22	Hugo Ekitike	(France)	20 June 2002 (aged 24)	(Germany) Eintracht Frankfurt	45	17	6
73	Rio Ngumoha	(England)	29 August 2008 (aged 17)	(England) LFC Academy	30	2	1

=== New contracts ===
Date	Pos.	No.	Player	Date until	Ref.
First team
18 June 2025	GK	56	(Czech Republic) Vítězslav Jaroš	Undisclosed	
26 June 2025	GK	95	(England) Harvey Davies	Undisclosed	
30 June 2025	MF	42	(England) Trey Nyoni	30 June 2030	
29 August 2025	MF	53	(England) James McConnell	30 June 2030	
30 August 2025	FW	18	(Netherlands) Cody Gakpo	30 June 2030	
25 September 2025	FW	73	(England) Rio Ngumoha	30 June 2028 (Note: First professional contract.)	
7 March 2026	MF	38	(Netherlands) Ryan Gravenberch	30 June 2032	
Academy
23 July 2025	FW	81	(Egypt) Kareem Ahmed	30 June 2026	
24 July 2025	MF	55	(England) Joe Bradshaw	Undisclosed	
25 July 2025	DF	63	(Wales) Owen Beck	Undisclosed	
14 August 2025	MF	91	(England) Luca Stephenson	Undisclosed	
10 September 2025	DF	90	(England) Emmanuel Airoboma	30 June 2026	
10 March 2026	FW	—	(England) Finn Inglethorpe	Undisclosed	
24 March 2026	MF	—	(England) Joe Upton	Undisclosed	
14 April 2026	DF	—	(England) DJ Esdaille	Undisclosed	

=== Retired numbers ===
No.	Pos.	Player	Tenure	Notes	Ref.
20	FW	(Portugal) Diogo Jota	2020–25	Posthumous honour	

== Transfers ==
=== In ===
Date	Pos.	No.	Player	From	Fee	Ref.
First team
1 June 2025	DF	30	(Netherlands) Jeremie Frimpong	(Germany) Bayer Leverkusen	£29,500,000	
7 June 2025	GK	41	(Hungary) Ármin Pécsi	(Hungary) Puskás Akadémia	£1,500,000	
20 June 2025	MF	7	(Germany) Florian Wirtz	(Germany) Bayer Leverkusen	£100,000,000 (Note: Fee may eventually rise to £116,500,000.)	
26 June 2025	DF	6	(Hungary) Milos Kerkez	(England) Bournemouth	£40,000,000	
1 July 2025 (Note: The transfer was completed on 27 August 2024, both clubs agreed that Mamardashvili would join at the start of the 2025–26 season.)	GK	25	(Georgia (country)) Giorgi Mamardashvili	(Spain) Valencia	£25,000,000 (Note: Fee may eventually rise to £29,000,000.)	
1 July 2025	GK	28	(England) Freddie Woodman	(England) Preston North End	Free transfer	
23 July 2025	FW	22	(France) Hugo Ekitike	(Germany) Eintracht Frankfurt	£69,000,000 (Note: Fee may eventually rise to £79,000,000.)	
15 August 2025	DF	15	(Italy) Giovanni Leoni	(Italy) Parma	£26,000,000 (Note: Fee may eventually rise to £30,000,000.)	
1 September 2025	FW	9	(Sweden) Alexander Isak	(England) Newcastle United	£125,000,000	
Academy
4 August 2025	FW	79	(England) Will Wright	(England) Salford City	£200,000	
9 January 2026	DF	75	(Senegal) Mor Talla Ndiaye	(Senegal) Amitié	£1,000,000	
▼ Spending: £417,200,000

Note^{1}: On 26 January 2026, Liverpool completed a transfer for defender Ifeanyi Ndukwe from Austria Wien for a reported fee of £2,600,000. Both clubs confirmed that the Austrian youth international would be joining the Premier League club at the start of the 2026–27 season.

Note^{2}: On 2 February 2026, Liverpool completed a transfer for defender Jérémy Jacquet from Rennes for a reported fee of £55,000,000 plus £5,000,000 in potential add-ons. Both clubs confirmed that the French youth international would be joining the Premier League club at the start of the 2026–27 season.

=== Out ===
Date	Pos.	No.	Player	To	Fee	Ref.
First team
1 June 2025	DF	66	(England) Trent Alexander-Arnold	(Spain) Real Madrid	£8,400,000 (Note: Fee may eventually rise to £10,000,000.)	
3 June 2025	GK	62	(Republic of Ireland) Caoimhín Kelleher	(England) Brentford	£12,500,000 (Note: Fee may eventually rise to £18,000,000.)	
23 June 2025	DF	47	(England) Nat Phillips	(England) West Bromwich Albion	£3,000,000	
2 July 2025	DF	78	(England) Jarell Quansah	(Germany) Bayer Leverkusen	£30,000,000 (Note: Fee may eventually rise to £35,000,000.)	
30 July 2025	FW	7	(Colombia) Luis Díaz	(Germany) Bayern Munich	£60,000,000 (Note: Fee may eventually rise to £65,500,000.)	
5 August 2025	MF	80	(England) Tyler Morton	(France) Lyon	£10,000,000 (Note: Fee may eventually rise to £15,000,000.)	
9 August 2025	FW	9	(Uruguay) Darwin Núñez	(Saudi Arabia) Al-Hilal	£46,200,000 (Note: Fee may eventually rise to £56,600,000.)	
18 August 2025	FW	50	(Scotland) Ben Gannon-Doak	(England) Bournemouth	£20,000,000 (Note: Fee may eventually rise to £25,000,000.)	
Academy
30 June 2025	GK	75	(Poland) Jakub Ojrzyński	(Sweden) Örebro SK	Free transfer	
30 June 2025	MF	79	(England) Dominic Corness	(Wales) The New Saints	Free transfer	
30 June 2025	FW	82	(England) Ranel Young	(Serbia) Ušće	Free transfer	
30 June 2025	GK	86	(England) Reece Trueman	(England) Vauxhall Motors	Free transfer	
30 June 2025	DF	90	(England) Lee Jonas	(Wales) Flint Town United	Free transfer	
30 June 2025	DF	—	(England) Louis Enahoro-Marcus	(England) Leeds United	Free transfer	
30 June 2025	DF	—	(England) Harry Evers	(England) Sheffield Wednesday	Free transfer	
1 January 2026	DF	77	(England) James Norris	(Republic of Ireland) Shelbourne	Undisclosed	
27 February 2026	FW	51	(Republic of Ireland) Trent Koné-Doherty	(Norway) Molde	£658,000	
▲ Income: £190,758,000 + Undisclosed fees

=== Loans in ===
Date	Pos.	No.	Player	From	Date until	Ref.
No loans in

=== Loans out ===
Date	Pos.	No.	Player	To	Date until	Ref.
First team
1 July 2025	GK	56	(Czech Republic) Vítězslav Jaroš	(Netherlands) Ajax	30 June 2026	
1 July 2025	GK	95	(England) Harvey Davies	(England) Crawley Town	2 February 2026 (Note: On 2 February 2026, Davies was recalled from his loan at Crawley Town.)	
29 August 2025	MF	53	(England) James McConnell	(Netherlands) Ajax	2 February 2026 (Note: On 2 February 2026, McConnell was recalled from his loan at Ajax.)	
31 August 2025	DF	21	(Greece) Kostas Tsimikas	(Italy) Roma	30 June 2026	
1 September 2025	MF	19	(England) Harvey Elliott	(England) Aston Villa	30 June 2026	
Academy
25 July 2025	DF	63	(Wales) Owen Beck	(England) Derby County	4 January 2026 (Note: On 4 January 2026, Beck returned from Derby County due to injury.)	
1 August 2025	DF	52	(Zimbabwe) Isaac Mabaya	(England) Wigan Athletic	30 June 2026	
14 August 2025	MF	91	(England) Luca Stephenson	(Scotland) Dundee United	30 June 2026	
22 August 2025	FW	67	(Wales) Lewis Koumas	(England) Birmingham City	26 January 2026 (Note: On 26 January 2026, Koumas was recalled from his loan at Birmingham City.)	
28 August 2025	MF	85	(England) James Balagizi	(England) Forest Green Rovers	7 January 2026 (Note: On 7 January 2026, Balagizi returned from Forest Green Rovers due to injury.)	
21 January 2026	DF	44	(England) Luke Chambers	(England) Charlton Athletic	30 June 2026	
30 January 2026	FW	67	(Wales) Lewis Koumas	(England) Hull City	30 June 2026	
1 February 2026	DF	48	(England) Calum Scanlon	(Wales) Cardiff City	30 June 2026	
5 March 2026	GK	93	(Poland) Fabian Mrozek	(United States) FC Cincinnati	31 December 2026	
17 March 2026	DF	69	(England) Josh Davidson	(England) Buxton	30 June 2026	

== Pre-season and friendlies ==
On 31 March 2025, Liverpool announced they would return to Asia for a pre-season tour, with one friendly confirmed against AC Milan in Hong Kong. A week later, the second friendly of the tour was confirmed to be against Yokohama F. Marinos in Yokohama, marking their first ever pre-season tour in Japan. An extra friendly ahead of the Asian tour against Preston North End was confirmed on 5 June 2025. Five days later, a double-header at Anfield against Athletic Bilbao was added to conclude the pre-season fixtures. On 20 July 2025, a behind-closed-doors friendly was played against Stoke City at the Liverpool Training Centre.

Win Draw Loss Fixtures

13 July 2025 Friendly	Preston North End	1–3	Liverpool	Preston, England
15:00 BST	Lindsay 83'	Report	Bradley 33'; Núñez 53'; Gakpo 88'	Stadium: Deepdale; Attendance: 21,289; Referee: Darren England (England)

20 July 2025 BCD Friendly	Liverpool	5–0	Stoke City	Kirkby, England
12:00 BST	Núñez 6', 12', 20'; Ngumoha 23'; Chiesa 88'	Report		Stadium: Liverpool Training Centre; Attendance: 0 (behind closed doors)

26 July 2025 Standard Chartered Trophy	Liverpool	2–4	Milan	Kowloon, Hong Kong
19:30 HKT	Szoboszlai 26'; Gakpo 90+3'	Report	Leão 10'; Loftus-Cheek 52'; Okafor 59', 90+4'	Stadium: Kai Tak Sports Park; Attendance: 49,704; Referee: Tam Ping Wun (Hong Kong)

30 July 2025 J.League World Challenge	Yokohama F. Marinos	1–3	Liverpool	Yokohama, Japan
19:30 JST	Uenaka 55'	Report	Wirtz 62'; Nyoni 68'; Elliott (yellow card) 83'; Ngumoha 87'	Stadium: Nissan Stadium; Attendance: 67,032; Referee: Ryo Tanimoto (Japan)

4 August 2025 Friendly	Liverpool	4–1	Athletic Bilbao	Liverpool, England
17:00 BST	Ngumoha 2'; Núñez 5'; Padilla 42' (o.g.); Elliott 58'	Report	Rego (yellow card) 18'; Guruzeta 76'	Stadium: Anfield; Attendance: 59,774; Referee: Robert Jones (England)

4 August 2025 Friendly	Liverpool	3–2	Athletic Bilbao	Liverpool, England
20:00 BST	Salah 14', (penalty missed) 81'; Gakpo 55', 70'	Report	Sancet 29'; Ruiz de Galarreta (yellow card) 53'; Gakpo 64' (o.g.)	Stadium: Anfield; Attendance: 59,774; Referee: Darren England (England)

== Competitions ==
=== Overall record ===
Competition	First match	Last match	Starting round	Final position	Record							
Competition	First match	Last match	Starting round	Final position	Pld	W	D	L	GF	GA	GD	Win %
Premier League	15 August 2025	24 May 2026	Matchday 1	5th	38	17	9	12	63	53	+10	44.74
FA Cup	12 January 2026	4 April 2026	Third round	Quarter-finals	4	3	0	1	10	6	+4	75.00
EFL Cup	23 September 2025	29 October 2025	Third round	Fourth round	2	1	0	1	2	4	−2	50.00
FA Community Shield	10 August 2025		Final	Runners-up	1	0	1	0	2	2	+0	0.00
UEFA Champions League	17 September 2025	14 April 2026	League phase	Quarter-finals	12	7	0	5	24	13	+11	58.33
Total					57	28	10	19	101	78	+23	49.12

Source: Soccerway

=== Premier League ===
==== League table ====
Pos	Team	Pld	W	D	L	GF	GA	GD	Pts	Qualification or relegation
3	Manchester United	38	20	11	7	69	50	+19	71	Qualification for the Champions League league phase (Note: The Premier League gained an additional Champions League place as a result of England gaining one of the two European Performance Spots (EPS) awarded to the two associations with the highest UEFA coefficient points in 2025–26.)
4	Aston Villa	38	19	8	11	56	49	+7	65	Qualification for the Champions League league phase
5	Liverpool	38	17	9	12	63	53	+10	60	Qualification for the Champions League league phase
6	Bournemouth	38	13	18	7	58	54	+4	57	Qualification for the Europa League league phase (Note: Since the winners of the 2025–26 FA Cup and 2025–26 EFL Cup, Manchester City, qualified for the Champions League by league position, the spot reserved for the FA Cup winners (Europa League league phase) was passed to the seventh-placed team, and the spot reserved for the EFL Cup winners (Conference League play-off round) was passed to the eighth-placed team.)
7	Sunderland	38	14	12	12	42	48	−6	54	Qualification for the Europa League league phase

Source: Premier League
Rules for classification: 1) Points; 2) Goal difference; 3) Goals scored; 4) If the champions, relegated teams or qualified teams for UEFA competitions cannot be determined by rules 1 to 3, rules 4.1 to 4.3 are applied – 4.1) Points gained in head-to-head record between such teams; 4.2) Away goals scored in head-to-head record between such teams; 4.3) Play-offs

==== Results summary ====
Overall								Home						Away					
Pld	W	D	L	GF	GA	GD	Pts	W	D	L	GF	GA	GD	W	D	L	GF	GA	GD
38	17	9	12	63	53	+10	60	10	6	3	34	20	+14	7	3	9	29	33	−4

Source: Soccerway

==== Results by round ====
Round	1	2	3	4	5	6	7	8	9	10	11	12	13	14	15	16	17	18	19	20	21	22	23	24	25	26	27	28	29	30	31	32	33	34	35	36	37	38
Ground	H	A	H	A	H	A	A	H	A	H	A	H	A	H	A	H	A	H	H	A	A	H	A	H	H	A	A	H	A	H	A	H	A	H	A	H	A	H
Result	W	W	W	W	W	L	L	L	L	W	L	L	W	D	D	W	W	W	D	D	D	D	L	W	L	W	W	W	L	D	L	W	W	W	L	D	L	D
Position	4	3	1	1	1	1	2	4	7	3	8	12	8	9	10	7	5	4	4	4	4	4	6	6	6	6	6	5	6	5	5	5	5	4	4	4	5	5
Points	3	6	9	12	15	15	15	15	15	18	18	18	21	22	23	26	29	32	33	34	35	36	36	39	39	42	45	48	48	49	49	52	55	58	58	59	59	60

Source: Premier League
A = Away; H = Home; W = Win; D = Draw; L = Loss; P = Postponed

==== Matches ====
The league fixtures were released on 18 June 2025.

Win Draw Loss Fixtures

15 August 2025 1	Liverpool	4–2	Bournemouth	Liverpool
20:00 BST	Ekitike 37'; Kerkez (yellow card) 43'; Gakpo 49'; Chiesa 88'; Salah 90+4'	Report	Brooks (yellow card) 14'; Semenyo 64', 76'; Evanilson (yellow card) 81'	Stadium: Anfield; Attendance: 60,315; Referee: Anthony Taylor

25 August 2025 2	Newcastle United	2–3	Liverpool	Newcastle upon Tyne
20:00 BST	Burn (yellow card) 44'; Gordon (red card) 45+3'; Bruno Guimarães (yellow card) 47', (goal) 57'; Osula 88'	Report	Gravenberch (yellow card) 8', (goal) 35'; Konaté (yellow card) 25'; Ekitike 46'; Bradley (yellow card) 87'; Ngumoha 90+10'	Stadium: St James' Park; Attendance: 52,230; Referee: Simon Hooper
Note: Fixture was initially scheduled for 23 August, but was moved for live Sky Sports broadcast.

31 August 2025 3	Liverpool	1–0	Arsenal	Liverpool
16:30 BST	Gravenberch (yellow card) 29'; Szoboszlai 83'; Endo (yellow card) 90+8'	Report	Gyökeres (yellow card) 66'; Zubimendi (yellow card) 81'	Stadium: Anfield; Attendance: 60,455; Referee: Chris Kavanagh
Note: Fixture was initially scheduled for 30 August, but was moved for live Sky Sports broadcast.

14 September 2025 4	Burnley	0–1	Liverpool	Burnley
14:00 BST	Ugochukwu (yellow card) 16' (yellow-red card) 84'	Report	Kerkez (yellow card) 22'; Bradley (yellow card) 75'; Salah 90+5' (pen.)	Stadium: Turf Moor; Attendance: 21,678; Referee: Michael Oliver
Note: Fixture was initially scheduled for 13 September, but was moved for live Sky Sports broadcast.

20 September 2025 5	Liverpool	2–1	Everton	Liverpool
12:30 BST	Gravenberch 10'; Ekitike 29'; Szoboszlai (yellow card) 69'; Wirtz (yellow card) 82'	Report	Ndiaye (yellow card) 28'; Gueye 58'; Dewsbury-Hall (yellow card) 78'; Grealish (yellow card) 90+4'	Stadium: Anfield; Attendance: 60,342; Referee: Darren England
Note: Fixture was initially scheduled for a 15:00 kick-off, but was moved for live TNT Sports broadcast.

27 September 2025 6	Crystal Palace	2–1	Liverpool	Selhurst
15:00 BST	Sarr 9'; Nketiah (yellow card) 78', (goal) 90+7'	Report	Konaté (yellow card) 26'; Van Dijk (yellow card) 61'; Chiesa (yellow card) 77', (goal) 87'	Stadium: Selhurst Park; Attendance: 25,118; Referee: Chris Kavanagh

4 October 2025 7	Chelsea	2–1	Liverpool	Fulham
17:30 BST	Caicedo 14'; Estêvão 90+5'	Report	Bradley (yellow card) 34'; Gakpo 63'; Szoboszlai (yellow card) 79'	Stadium: Stamford Bridge; Attendance: 39,767; Referee: Anthony Taylor
Note: Fixture was initially scheduled for a 15:00 kick-off, but was moved for live Sky Sports broadcast.

19 October 2025 8	Liverpool	1–2	Manchester United	Liverpool
16:30 BST	Gakpo 78'	Report	Mbeumo 2'; Amad (yellow card) 52'; Casemiro (yellow card) 57'; Maguire 84'	Stadium: Anfield; Attendance: 60,337; Referee: Michael Oliver
Note: Fixture was initially scheduled for 18 October, but was moved for live Sky Sports broadcast.

25 October 2025 9	Brentford	3–2	Liverpool	Brentford
20:00 BST	Ouattara 5'; Schade 45', (yellow card) 76'; Thiago 60' (pen.), (yellow card) 90+10'; Lewis-Potter (yellow card) 90+4'	Report	Kerkez (yellow card) 33', (goal) 45+5'; Salah (yellow card) 57', (goal) 89'	Stadium: Brentford Community Stadium; Attendance: 17,214; Referee: Simon Hooper / Tim Robinson (Note: Hooper was replaced by the fourth official Robinson at half-time, after he suffered from a hamstring injury.)
Note: Fixture was initially scheduled for a 15:00 kick-off, but was moved to 12:30 for live TNT Sports broadcast, and later moved due to Liverpool's participation in the UEFA Champions League league phase on the preceding Wednesday.

1 November 2025 10	Liverpool	2–0	Aston Villa	Liverpool
20:00 GMT	Salah 45+1'; Van Dijk (yellow card) 54'; Gravenberch 58'; Szoboszlai (yellow card) 87'	Report	Cash (yellow card) 57'; Onana (yellow card) 73'; Rogers (yellow card) 80'	Stadium: Anfield; Attendance: 60,407; Referee: Stuart Attwell
Note: Fixture was initially scheduled for a 15:00 kick-off, but was moved for live TNT Sports broadcast.

9 November 2025 11	Manchester City	3–0	Liverpool	Manchester
16:30 GMT	Haaland (penalty missed) 13', 29'; González (yellow card) 27', (goal) 45+3'; Silva (yellow card) 41'; Doku 63'	Report	Mac Allister (yellow card) 36'; Bradley (yellow card) 52'; Jones (yellow card) 89'; Szoboszlai (yellow card) 90+1'	Stadium: City of Manchester Stadium; Attendance: 52,511; Referee: Chris Kavanagh
Note: Fixture was initially scheduled for 8 November, but was moved for live Sky Sports broadcast.

22 November 2025 12	Liverpool	0–3	Nottingham Forest	Liverpool
15:00 GMT	Gravenberch (yellow card) 66'; Chiesa (yellow card) 87'	Report	Murillo 33'; Savona 46'; Gibbs-White 78'	Stadium: Anfield; Attendance: 60,419; Referee: Andy Madley

30 November 2025 13	West Ham United	0–2	Liverpool	Stratford
14:05 GMT	Magassa (yellow card) 66'; Paquetá (yellow card) 83' (yellow-red card) 84'	Report	Isak 60'; Gakpo 90+2'	Stadium: London Stadium; Attendance: 62,469; Referee: Darren England
Note: Fixture was initially scheduled for 29 November, but was moved for live Sky Sports broadcast.

3 December 2025 14	Liverpool	1–1	Sunderland	Liverpool
20:15 GMT	Gomez (yellow card) 55'; Mukiele 81' (o.g.)	Report	Le Fée (yellow card) 54'; Talbi 67'	Stadium: Anfield; Attendance: 60,414; Referee: Stuart Attwell
Note: Fixture was initially scheduled for a 20:00 kick-off, but was moved for live Sky Sports broadcast.

6 December 2025 15	Leeds United	3–3	Liverpool	Leeds
17:30 GMT	Bogle (yellow card) 20'; Gudmundsson (yellow card) 26'; Calvert-Lewin 73' (pen.); Stach 75'; Struijk (yellow card) 89'; Tanaka 90+6'	Report	Bradley (yellow card) 45+3'; Ekitike 48', 50'; Szoboszlai 80'; Van Dijk (yellow card) 80'; Gomez (yellow card) 90+1'	Stadium: Elland Road; Attendance: 36,842; Referee: Anthony Taylor
Note: Fixture was initially scheduled for a 15:00 kick-off, but was moved for live Sky Sports broadcast.

13 December 2025 16	Liverpool	2–0	Brighton & Hove Albion	Liverpool
15:00 GMT	Ekitike 1', 60'; Konaté (yellow card) 64'	Report	Gómez (yellow card) 45+3'; Dunk (yellow card) 59'	Stadium: Anfield; Attendance: 60,429; Referee: Craig Pawson

20 December 2025 17	Tottenham Hotspur	1–2	Liverpool	Tottenham
17:30 GMT	Simons (red card) 33'; Romero (yellow card) 66' (yellow-red card) 90+3'; Richarlison 83', (yellow card) 90+11'; Van de Ven (yellow card) 85'; Bentancur (yellow card) 90+5'	Report	Isak 56'; Ekitike 66'; Konaté (yellow card) 76'; Szoboszlai (yellow card) 83'; Mac Allister (yellow card) 90+7'	Stadium: Tottenham Hotspur Stadium; Attendance: 61,138; Referee: John Brooks
Note: Fixture was initially scheduled for a 15:00 kick-off, but was moved for live Sky Sports broadcast.

27 December 2025 18	Liverpool	2–1	Wolverhampton Wanderers	Liverpool
15:00 GMT	Gravenberch 41'; Wirtz 42'	Report	S. Bueno 51'; André (yellow card) 56'	Stadium: Anfield; Attendance: 60,466; Referee: Simon Hooper

1 January 2026 19	Liverpool	0–0	Leeds United	Liverpool
17:30 GMT		Report	Ampadu (yellow card) 61'; Bijol (yellow card) 62'	Stadium: Anfield; Attendance: 60,343; Referee: Chris Kavanagh
Note: Fixture was initially scheduled for 30 December 2025, but was moved for live Sky Sports broadcast.

4 January 2026 20	Fulham	2–2	Liverpool	Fulham
15:15 GMT	Wilson 17', (yellow card) 71'; Reed 90+7'	Report	Wirtz 57'; Gakpo 90+4', (yellow card) 90+5'	Stadium: Craven Cottage; Attendance: 27,547; Referee: Craig Pawson
Note: Fixture was initially scheduled for 3 January, but was moved to 4 January at 15:00 for live Sky Sports broadcast, and later delayed by 15 minutes due to a medical emergency at the stadium.

8 January 2026 21	Arsenal	0–0	Liverpool	Holloway
20:00 GMT	Trossard (yellow card) 12'; Martinelli (yellow card) 90+3'	Report	Mac Allister (yellow card) 90'; Konaté (yellow card) 90+3'	Stadium: Emirates Stadium; Attendance: 60,258; Referee: Anthony Taylor
Note: Fixture was initially scheduled for 7 January, but was moved for live Sky Sports broadcast.

17 January 2026 22	Liverpool	1–1	Burnley	Liverpool
15:00 GMT	Szoboszlai (penalty missed) 32'; Kerkez (yellow card) 40'; Wirtz 42'	Report	Edwards 65'; Barnes (yellow card) 90+1'; Humphreys (yellow card) 90+2'	Stadium: Anfield; Attendance: 60,431; Referee: Andy Madley

24 January 2026 23	Bournemouth	3–2	Liverpool	Bournemouth
17:30 GMT	Evanilson 26'; Jiménez 33'; Kroupi (yellow card) 45+3'; Adli 90+5'	Report	Van Dijk 45'; Szoboszlai 80'; Gravenberch (yellow card) 90+3'	Stadium: Dean Court; Attendance: 11,260; Referee: Michael Salisbury
Note: Fixture was initially scheduled for a 15:00 kick-off, but was moved for live Sky Sports broadcast.

31 January 2026 24	Liverpool	4–1	Newcastle United	Liverpool
20:00 GMT	Ekitike 41', 43'; Mac Allister (yellow card) 59'; Wirtz 67'; Konaté 90+3'	Report	Gordon (yellow card) 11', (goal) 36'; Ramsey (yellow card) 45+3'; Burn (yellow card) 86'	Stadium: Anfield; Attendance: 60,416; Referee: Simon Hooper
Note: Fixture was initially scheduled for a 15:00 kick-off, but was moved for live TNT Sports broadcast.

8 February 2026 25	Liverpool	1–2	Manchester City	Liverpool
16:30 GMT	Van Dijk (yellow card) 47'; Szoboszlai 74', (red card) 90+13'; Alisson (yellow card) 90+2'	Report	Marmoush (yellow card) 42'; Guéhi (yellow card) 69'; Silva 84', (yellow card) 90+7'; Haaland 90+3' (pen.), (yellow card) 90+4'	Stadium: Anfield; Attendance: 60,336; Referee: Craig Pawson
Note: Fixture was initially scheduled for 7 February, but was moved for live Sky Sports broadcast.

11 February 2026 26	Sunderland	0–1	Liverpool	Sunderland
20:15 GMT	Mandava (yellow card) 24'	Report	Van Dijk 61'	Stadium: Stadium of Light; Attendance: 47,159; Referee: Chris Kavanagh
Note: Fixture was initially scheduled for a 20:00 kick-off, but was moved for live TNT Sports broadcast.

22 February 2026 27	Nottingham Forest	0–1	Liverpool	West Bridgford
14:00 GMT	Gibbs-White (yellow card) 20'; Aina (yellow card) 61'	Report	Mac Allister 90+7'	Stadium: City Ground; Attendance: 30,737; Referee: Anthony Taylor
Note: Fixture was initially scheduled for 21 February, but was moved due to Nottingham Forest's participation in the UEFA Europa League knockout phase play-offs on the preceding Thursday.

28 February 2026 28	Liverpool	5–2	West Ham United	Liverpool
15:00 GMT	Ekitike 5'; Van Dijk 24'; Mac Allister 43'; Gakpo (yellow card) 55', (goal) 70'; Disasi 82' (o.g.); Szoboszlai (yellow card) 85'	Report	Magassa (yellow card) 45'; Souček 49'; Castellanos 75'; Summerville (yellow card) 79'	Stadium: Anfield; Attendance: 60,425; Referee: Tim Robinson

3 March 2026 29	Wolverhampton Wanderers	2–1	Liverpool	Wolverhampton
20:15 GMT	João Gomes (yellow card) 69'; R. Gomes 78'; S. Bueno (yellow card) 90'; André 90+4'	Report	Gravenberch (yellow card) 22'; Salah 83'	Stadium: Molineux Stadium; Attendance: 30,247; Referee: Thomas Bramall
Note: Fixture was initially scheduled for 4 March, but was moved for live TNT Sports broadcast.

15 March 2026 30	Liverpool	1–1	Tottenham Hotspur	Liverpool
16:30 GMT	Szoboszlai 18'	Report	Richarlison 90'	Stadium: Anfield; Attendance: 60,386; Referee: Chris Kavanagh
Note: Fixture was initially scheduled for 14 March, but was moved for live Sky Sports broadcast.

21 March 2026 31	Brighton & Hove Albion	2–1	Liverpool	Brighton and Hove
12:45 GMT	Welbeck 14', 56', (yellow card) 48'; Minteh (yellow card) 25'; Gómez (yellow card) 45+5'; Dunk (yellow card) 85'; Wieffer (yellow card) 90+4'	Report	Kerkez 30'; Konaté (yellow card) 45'; Frimpong (yellow card) 61'; Mac Allister (yellow card) 68'; Szoboszlai (yellow card) 79'; Chiesa (yellow card) 90'	Stadium: Falmer Stadium; Attendance: 31,680; Referee: Darren England
Note: Fixture was initially scheduled for a 15:00 kick-off, but was moved to 12:30 for live TNT Sports broadcast, and later delayed by 15 minutes due to a road traffic accident nearby the stadium.

11 April 2026 32	Liverpool	2–0	Fulham	Liverpool
17:30 BST	Ngumoha 36'; Salah 40'	Report		Stadium: Anfield; Attendance: 60,401; Referee: Anthony Taylor
Note: Fixture was initially scheduled for a 15:00 kick-off, but was moved for live Sky Sports broadcast.

19 April 2026 33	Everton	1–2	Liverpool	Liverpool
14:00 BST	Pickford (yellow card) 22'; Beto 54'; Garner (yellow card) 90+12'	Report	Salah 29'; Van Dijk 90+10'	Stadium: Hill Dickinson Stadium; Attendance: 52,585; Referee: Chris Kavanagh
Note: Fixture was initially scheduled for 18 April, but was moved for live Sky Sports broadcast.

25 April 2026 34	Liverpool	3–1	Crystal Palace	Liverpool
15:00 BST	Isak 35'; Robertson 40'; Szoboszlai (yellow card) 90'; Wirtz 90+6'	Report	Muñoz (yellow card) 19', (goal) 71'; Henderson (yellow card) 32'; Sosa (yellow card) 90+3'	Stadium: Anfield; Attendance: 60,314; Referee: Andy Madley

3 May 2026 35	Manchester United	3–2	Liverpool	Trafford
15:30 BST	Cunha 6'; Šeško 14'; Shaw (yellow card) 49'; Mainoo 77'; Fernandes (yellow card) 81'	Report	Szoboszlai 47'; Gakpo 56', (yellow card) 85'; Jones (yellow card) 75'	Stadium: Old Trafford; Attendance: 74,027; Referee: Darren England
Note: Fixture was initially scheduled for 2 May, but was moved for live Sky Sports broadcast.

9 May 2026 36	Liverpool	1–1	Chelsea	Liverpool
12:30 BST	Gravenberch 6'; Gomez (yellow card) 88'; Mac Allister (yellow card) 90+4'	Report	Fernández 35', (yellow card) 73'; Hato (yellow card) 67'; Cucurella (yellow card) 83'; Caicedo (yellow card) 89'	Stadium: Anfield; Attendance: 60,429; Referee: Craig Pawson
Note: Fixture was initially scheduled for a 15:00 kick-off, but was moved for live TNT Sports broadcast.

15 May 2026 37	Aston Villa	4–2	Liverpool	Birmingham
20:00 BST	Cash (yellow card) 39'; Rogers 42'; Watkins (yellow card) 45+3', (goal) 57', 73'; McGinn (yellow card) 66', (goal) 89'	Report	Van Dijk 52', 90+2'; Gomez (yellow card) 62'	Stadium: Villa Park; Attendance: 43,033; Referee: Chris Kavanagh
Note: Fixture was initially scheduled for a 15:00 kick-off on 17 May, but was moved to 12:30 for live Sky Sports broadcast, and later moved due to Aston Villa's participation in the UEFA Europa League final on the following Wednesday.

24 May 2026 38	Liverpool	1–1	Brentford	Liverpool
16:00 BST	Jones 58'; Konaté (yellow card) 79'; Mac Allister (yellow card) 90+2'	Report	Schade 64'; Henderson (yellow card) 80'; Janelt (yellow card) 90+3'; Collins (yellow card) 90+5'	Stadium: Anfield; Attendance: 60,325; Referee: Darren England

=== FA Cup ===
As a Premier League side, Liverpool entered the FA Cup in the third round, and were drawn at home to League One club Barnsley. In the fourth round, they were drawn at home to Premier League side Brighton & Hove Albion. They were then drawn away to Premier League side Wolverhampton Wanderers in the fifth round, and away to Premier League club Manchester City in the quarter-finals.

Win Draw Loss Fixtures

12 January 2026 Third round	Liverpool	4–1	Barnsley	Liverpool
19:45 GMT	Szoboszlai 9'; Gomez (yellow card) 32'; Frimpong 36'; Wirtz 84'; Ekitike 90+4'	Report	Phillips 40'	Stadium: Anfield; Attendance: 60,206; Referee: Farai Hallam

14 February 2026 Fourth round	Liverpool	3–0	Brighton & Hove Albion	Liverpool
20:00 GMT	Jones 42'; Szoboszlai 56'; Salah 68' (pen.)	Report	Dunk (yellow card) 15'; Gómez (yellow card) 33'; Baleba (yellow card) 41'; Van Hecke (yellow card) 67'	Stadium: Anfield; Attendance: 60,227; Referee: Stuart Attwell

6 March 2026 Fifth round	Wolverhampton Wanderers	1–3	Liverpool	Wolverhampton
20:00 GMT	S. Bueno (yellow card) 17'; Hwang Hee-chan 90+1'; João Gomes (yellow card) 90+5'	Report	Robertson 51'; Salah 53'; Szoboszlai (yellow card) 71'; Jones 74'	Stadium: Molineux Stadium; Attendance: 29,881; Referee: Farai Hallam

4 April 2026 Quarter-finals	Manchester City	4–0	Liverpool	Manchester
12:45 BST	Rodri (yellow card) 34'; Haaland 39' (pen.), 45+2', 57'; Semenyo 50'; Silva (yellow card) 67'; González (yellow card) 88'	Report	Gravenberch (yellow card) 24'; Salah (penalty missed) 64'; Kerkez (yellow card) 65'; Konaté (yellow card) 87'	Stadium: City of Manchester Stadium; Attendance: 50,754; Referee: Michael Oliver

=== EFL Cup ===
As one of the Premier League clubs participating in European competitions, Liverpool entered the EFL Cup in the third round, and were drawn at home to Championship club Southampton. In the fourth round, they were drawn at home to Premier League side Crystal Palace.

Win Draw Loss Fixtures

23 September 2025 Third round	Liverpool	2–1	Southampton	Liverpool
20:00 BST	Isak 43'; Ekitike (yellow card) 53' (yellow-red card) 86', (goal) 85'	Report	Archer (yellow card) 45'; Charles 76'; Manning (yellow card) 90+2'	Stadium: Anfield; Attendance: 59,518; Referee: Thomas Bramall

29 October 2025 Fourth round	Liverpool	0–3	Crystal Palace	Liverpool
19:45 GMT	Robertson (yellow card) 55'; Chiesa (yellow card) 72'; Nallo (red card) 79'	Report	Sarr 41', 45'; Kamada (yellow card) 45+2'; Pino 88', (yellow card) 90'	Stadium: Anfield; Attendance: 60,420; Referee: Craig Pawson

=== FA Community Shield ===
As the defending Premier League champions, Liverpool faced the reigning FA Cup winners Crystal Palace in the FA Community Shield.

Win Draw Loss Fixtures

10 August 2025 Final	Crystal Palace	2–2 (3–2 p)	Liverpool	Wembley
15:00 BST	Mateta 17' (pen.); Sarr 77'	Report	Ekitike 4'; Frimpong 21'; Konaté (yellow card) 43'; Wirtz (yellow card) 44'; Salah (yellow card) 87'	Stadium: Wembley Stadium; Attendance: 82,645; Referee: Chris Kavanagh
	Penalties
	Mateta (penalty scored); Eze (penalty missed); Sarr (penalty scored); Sosa (penalty missed); Devenny (penalty scored)		(penalty missed) Salah; (penalty missed) Mac Allister; (penalty scored) Gakpo; (penalty missed) Elliott; (penalty scored) Szoboszlai

=== UEFA Champions League ===
As the reigning champions in the Premier League, Liverpool entered the UEFA Champions League in the league phase.

==== League phase ====
The league phase draw was held on 28 August 2025. Liverpool were drawn at home to Real Madrid, Atlético Madrid, PSV Eindhoven, Qarabağ, and away to Inter Milan, Eintracht Frankfurt, Marseille and Galatasaray.

Pos	Team	Pld	W	D	L	GF	GA	GD	Pts	Qualification
1	(The Football Association) Arsenal	8	8	0	0	23	4	+19	24	Advance to round of 16 (seeded)
2	(German Football Association) Bayern Munich	8	7	0	1	22	8	+14	21	Advance to round of 16 (seeded)
3	(The Football Association) Liverpool	8	6	0	2	20	8	+12	18	Advance to round of 16 (seeded)
4	(The Football Association) Tottenham Hotspur	8	5	2	1	17	7	+10	17	Advance to round of 16 (seeded)
5	(Royal Spanish Football Federation) Barcelona	8	5	1	2	22	14	+8	16	Advance to round of 16 (seeded)

Source: UEFA
Rules for classification: League phase tiebreakers

Round	1	2	3	4	5	6	7	8
Ground	H	A	A	H	H	A	A	H
Result	W	L	W	W	L	W	W	W
Position	11	17	10	8	13	9	4	3
Points	3	3	6	9	9	12	15	18

Source: UEFA
A = Away; H = Home; W = Win; D = Draw; L = Loss

Win Draw Loss Fixtures

17 September 2025 1	Liverpool (England)	3–2	(Spain) Atlético Madrid	Liverpool, England
20:00 BST	Robertson 4'; Salah 6'; Bradley (yellow card) 71'; Van Dijk 90+2'	Report	Le Normand (yellow card) 32'; Llorente 45+3', 81'; Lenglet (yellow card) 45+4'	Stadium: Anfield; Attendance: 59,507; Referee: Maurizio Mariani (Italy)

30 September 2025 2	Galatasaray (Turkey)	1–0	(England) Liverpool	Istanbul, Turkey
22:00 TRT	Osimhen 16' (pen.); Lemina (yellow card) 36'; Bardakcı (yellow card) 61'; Jakobs (yellow card) 76'; Icardi (yellow card) 76'; Çakır (yellow card) 88'	Report	Gravenberch (yellow card) 45+3'; Bradley (yellow card) 73'; Jones (yellow card) 90+1'	Stadium: Rams Park; Attendance: 50,651; Referee: Clément Turpin (France)

22 October 2025 3	Eintracht Frankfurt (Germany)	1–5	(England) Liverpool	Frankfurt, Germany
21:00 CEST	Kristensen 26'; Dōan (yellow card) 52'; Amenda (yellow card) 54'	Report	Ekitike 35'; Van Dijk 39'; Konaté 44'; Gakpo 66'; Szoboszlai 70'	Stadium: Waldstadion; Attendance: 58,700; Referee: François Letexier (France)

4 November 2025 4	Liverpool (England)	1–0	(Spain) Real Madrid	Liverpool, England
20:00 GMT	Mac Allister (yellow card) 52', (goal) 61'	Report	Vinícius (yellow card) 23'; Huijsen (yellow card) 45+1'; Bellingham (yellow card) 60'; Carreras (yellow card) 90+5'	Stadium: Anfield; Attendance: 59,916; Referee: István Kovács (Romania)

26 November 2025 5	Liverpool (England)	1–4	(Netherlands) PSV Eindhoven	Liverpool, England
20:00 GMT	Szoboszlai 16'; Van Dijk (yellow card) 17'	Report	Perišić 6' (pen.); Til 56'; Driouech 73', 90+1'	Stadium: Anfield; Attendance: 59,964; Referee: Alejandro Hernández Hernández (Spain)

9 December 2025 6	Inter Milan (Italy)	0–1	(England) Liverpool	Milan, Italy
21:00 CET	L. Martínez (yellow card) 13'; Mkhitaryan (yellow card) 57'; Bastoni (yellow card) 87'	Report	Ekitike (yellow card) 39'; Jones (yellow card) 73'; Szoboszlai 88' (pen.)	Stadium: San Siro; Attendance: 73,892; Referee: Felix Zwayer (Germany)

21 January 2026 7	Marseille (France)	0–3	(England) Liverpool	Marseille, France
21:00 CET	Pavard (yellow card) 48'	Report	Szoboszlai 45+1'; Rulli 72' (o.g.); Gakpo 90+3'	Stadium: Stade Vélodrome; Attendance: 65,631; Referee: Slavko Vinčić (Slovenia)

28 January 2026 8	Liverpool (England)	6–0	(Azerbaijan) Qarabağ	Liverpool, England
20:00 GMT	Mac Allister 15', 61'; Wirtz 21'; Salah 50'; Ekitike 57'; Chiesa 90'	Report	Janković (yellow card) 70'	Stadium: Anfield; Attendance: 60,043; Referee: Ivan Kružliak (Slovakia)

==== Knockout phase ====
As a top-eight team in the league phase, Liverpool entered the knockout phase directly into the round of 16.

===== Round of 16 =====
The round of 16 draw was held on 27 February 2026. Liverpool were drawn against Turkish champions Galatasaray, with the first leg away and the second leg at home.

10 March 2026 First leg	Galatasaray (Turkey)	1–0	(England) Liverpool	Istanbul, Turkey
20:45 TRT	Lemina 7'; Sánchez (yellow card) 90'	Report	Kerkez (yellow card) 33'; Van Dijk (yellow card) 55'; Gravenberch (yellow card) 88'; Szoboszlai (yellow card) 90+5'	Stadium: Rams Park; Attendance: 51,373; Referee: Jesús Gil Manzano (Spain)

18 March 2026 Second leg	Liverpool (England)	4–0 (4–1 agg.)	(Turkey) Galatasaray	Liverpool, England
20:00 GMT	Szoboszlai 25'; Salah (penalty missed) 45+4', 62'; Ekitike 51'; Gravenberch 53'	Report		Stadium: Anfield; Attendance: 59,980; Referee: Paweł Raczkowski (Poland)

===== Quarter-finals =====
The quarter-finals draw were automatically determined after the round of 16 draw on 27 February 2026. As a result, Liverpool faced French champions and defending European champions Paris Saint-Germain, with the first leg away and the second leg at home.

8 April 2026 First leg	Paris Saint-Germain (France)	2–0	(England) Liverpool	Paris, France
21:00 CEST	Doué 11'; Kvaratskhelia 65'	Report	Gomez (yellow card) 28'; Mac Allister (yellow card) 31'	Stadium: Parc des Princes; Attendance: 47,511; Referee: José María Sánchez Martínez (Spain)

14 April 2026 Second leg	Liverpool (England)	0–2 (0–4 agg.)	(France) Paris Saint-Germain	Liverpool, England
20:00 BST	Mac Allister (yellow card) 45+1'; Konaté (yellow card) 85'	Report	Dembélé 72', 90+1'	Stadium: Anfield; Attendance: 59,627; Referee: Maurizio Mariani (Italy)

== Statistics ==
=== Appearances ===
Players with no appearances are not included on the list.

No.	Pos	Nat	Player	Total		Premier League		FA Cup		EFL Cup		Champions League		Community Shield	
No.	Pos	Nat	Player	Apps	Goals	Apps	Goals	Apps	Goals	Apps	Goals	Apps	Goals	Apps	Goals
1	GK	(Brazil) BRA	Alisson Becker	35	0	26+0	0	2+0	0	0+0	0	6+0	0	1+0	0
2	DF	(England) ENG	Joe Gomez	33	0	7+14	0	3+1	0	2+0	0	4+2	0	0+0	0
3	MF	(Japan) JPN	Wataru Endo	12	0	1+7	0	0+0	0	2+0	0	0+1	0	0+1	0
4	DF	(Netherlands) NED	Virgil van Dijk	55	8	38+0	6	4+0	0	0+0	0	12+0	2	1+0	0
5	DF	(France) FRA	Ibrahima Konaté	51	2	36+0	1	2+2	0	0+0	0	10+0	1	1+0	0
6	DF	(Hungary) HUN	Milos Kerkez	48	2	27+7	2	2+0	0	1+1	0	7+2	0	1+0	0
7	MF	(Germany) GER	Florian Wirtz	49	7	27+6	5	2+2	1	0+0	0	10+1	1	1+0	0
8	MF	(Hungary) HUN	Dominik Szoboszlai	53	13	36+0	6	4+0	2	0+0	0	12+0	5	1+0	0
9	FW	(Sweden) SWE	Alexander Isak	22	4	8+6	3	0+0	0	1+0	1	4+3	0	0+0	0
10	MF	(Argentina) ARG	Alexis Mac Allister	55	5	32+5	2	3+1	0	1+0	0	9+3	3	0+1	0
11	FW	(Egypt) EGY	Mohamed Salah	41	12	23+4	7	3+0	2	0+0	0	7+3	3	1+0	0
12	DF	(Northern Ireland) NIR	Conor Bradley	21	0	12+3	0	0+0	0	0+1	0	1+4	0	0+0	0
14	FW	(Italy) ITA	Federico Chiesa	36	3	1+25	2	2+1	0	2+0	0	0+5	1	0+0	0
15	DF	(Italy) ITA	Giovanni Leoni	1	0	0+0	0	0+0	0	1+0	0	0+0	0	0+0	0
17	MF	(England) ENG	Curtis Jones	49	3	18+16	1	4+0	2	1+0	0	5+4	0	1+0	0
18	FW	(Netherlands) NED	Cody Gakpo	52	9	32+4	7	3+1	0	0+0	0	6+5	2	1+0	0
22	FW	(France) FRA	Hugo Ekitike	45	17	21+7	11	1+2	1	0+1	1	11+1	3	1+0	1
25	GK	(Georgia (country)) GEO	Giorgi Mamardashvili	20	0	10+0	0	2+0	0	1+0	0	6+1	0	0+0	0
26	DF	(Scotland) SCO	Andy Robertson	36	3	11+13	1	2+0	1	2+0	0	5+2	1	0+1	0
28	GK	(England) ENG	Freddie Woodman	4	0	2+1	0	0+0	0	1+0	0	0+0	0	0+0	0
30	DF	(Netherlands) NED	Jeremie Frimpong	35	2	12+9	0	1+2	1	1+0	0	8+1	0	1+0	1
38	MF	(Netherlands) NED	Ryan Gravenberch	50	6	34+2	5	2+1	0	0+0	0	11+0	1	0+0	0
42	MF	(England) ENG	Trey Nyoni	14	0	0+6	0	0+3	0	2+0	0	0+3	0	0+0	0
47	DF	(Scotland) SCO	Calvin Ramsay	2	0	0+0	0	0+1	0	1+0	0	0+0	0	0+0	0
49	FW	(England) ENG	Kaide Gordon	1	0	0+0	0	0+0	0	0+1	0	0+0	0	0+0	0
65	DF	(England) ENG	Amara Nallo	2	0	0+0	0	0+0	0	0+1	0	0+1	0	0+0	0
68	MF	(Northern Ireland) NIR	Kieran Morrison	2	0	0+0	0	0+1	0	1+0	0	0+0	0	0+0	0
73	FW	(England) ENG	Rio Ngumoha	29	2	5+14	2	2+2	0	2+0	0	0+4	0	0+0	0
76	FW	(England) ENG	Jayden Danns	1	0	0+0	0	0+0	0	0+1	0	0+0	0	0+0	0
92	DF	(England) ENG	Wellity Lucky	1	0	0+0	0	0+0	0	0+1	0	0+0	0	0+0	0
Player who featured but departed the club on loan during the season:
19	MF	(England) ENG	Harvey Elliott	2	0	0+1	0	0+0	0	0+0	0	0+0	0	0+1	0
Player who featured but departed the club permanently during the season:
51	FW	(Republic of Ireland) IRL	Trent Koné-Doherty	1	0	0+0	0	0+0	0	0+1	0	0+0	0	0+0	0

=== Goals ===
Rank	Pos.	No.	Player	Premier League	FA Cup	EFL Cup	Champions League	Community Shield	Total
1	FW	22	(France) Hugo Ekitike	11	1	1	3	1	17
2	MF	8	(Hungary) Dominik Szoboszlai	6	2	0	5	0	13
3	FW	11	(Egypt) Mohamed Salah	7	2	0	3	0	12
4	FW	18	(Netherlands) Cody Gakpo	7	0	0	2	0	9
5	DF	4	(Netherlands) Virgil van Dijk	6	0	0	2	0	8
6	MF	7	(Germany) Florian Wirtz	5	1	0	1	0	7
7	MF	38	(Netherlands) Ryan Gravenberch	5	0	0	1	0	6
8	MF	10	(Argentina) Alexis Mac Allister	2	0	0	3	0	5
9	FW	9	(Sweden) Alexander Isak	3	0	1	0	0	4
10	FW	14	(Italy) Federico Chiesa	2	0	0	1	0	3
10	MF	17	(England) Curtis Jones	1	2	0	0	0	3
10	DF	26	(Scotland) Andy Robertson	1	1	0	1	0	3
13	DF	5	(France) Ibrahima Konaté	1	0	0	1	0	2
13	DF	6	(Hungary) Milos Kerkez	2	0	0	0	0	2
13	DF	30	(Netherlands) Jeremie Frimpong	0	1	0	0	1	2
13	FW	73	(England) Rio Ngumoha	2	0	0	0	0	2
Own goals				2	0	0	1	0	3
Total				63	10	2	24	2	101

=== Clean sheets ===
Rank	No.	Player	Premier League	FA Cup	EFL Cup	Champions League	Community Shield	Total
1	1	(Brazil) Alisson Becker	8	1	0	4	0	13
2	25	(Georgia (country)) Giorgi Mamardashvili	2	0	0	1	0	3
Total			10	1	0	5	0	16

=== Disciplinary record ===
No.	Pos.	Player	Premier League			FA Cup			EFL Cup			Champions League			Community Shield			Total		
No.	Pos.	Player	Yellow card	(yellow card) (yellow-red card)	Red card	Yellow card	(yellow card) (yellow-red card)	Red card	Yellow card	(yellow card) (yellow-red card)	Red card	Yellow card	(yellow card) (yellow-red card)	Red card	Yellow card	(yellow card) (yellow-red card)	Red card	Yellow card	(yellow card) (yellow-red card)	Red card
1	GK	(Brazil) Alisson Becker	1	0	0	0	0	0	0	0	0	0	0	0	0	0	0	1	0	0
2	DF	(England) Joe Gomez	4	0	0	1	0	0	0	0	0	1	0	0	0	0	0	6	0	0
3	MF	(Japan) Wataru Endo	1	0	0	0	0	0	0	0	0	0	0	0	0	0	0	1	0	0
4	DF	(Netherlands) Virgil van Dijk	4	0	0	0	0	0	0	0	0	2	0	0	0	0	0	6	0	0
5	DF	(France) Ibrahima Konaté	7	0	0	1	0	0	0	0	0	1	0	0	1	0	0	10	0	0
6	DF	(Hungary) Milos Kerkez	4	0	0	1	0	0	0	0	0	1	0	0	0	0	0	6	0	0
7	MF	(Germany) Florian Wirtz	1	0	0	0	0	0	0	0	0	0	0	0	1	0	0	2	0	0
8	MF	(Hungary) Dominik Szoboszlai	8	0	1	1	0	0	0	0	0	1	0	0	0	0	0	10	0	1
10	MF	(Argentina) Alexis Mac Allister	7	0	0	0	0	0	0	0	0	3	0	0	0	0	0	10	0	0
11	FW	(Egypt) Mohamed Salah	1	0	0	0	0	0	0	0	0	0	0	0	1	0	0	2	0	0
12	DF	(Northern Ireland) Conor Bradley	5	0	0	0	0	0	0	0	0	2	0	0	0	0	0	7	0	0
14	FW	(Italy) Federico Chiesa	3	0	0	0	0	0	1	0	0	0	0	0	0	0	0	4	0	0
17	MF	(England) Curtis Jones	2	0	0	0	0	0	0	0	0	2	0	0	0	0	0	4	0	0
18	FW	(Netherlands) Cody Gakpo	3	0	0	0	0	0	0	0	0	0	0	0	0	0	0	3	0	0
22	FW	(France) Hugo Ekitike	0	0	0	0	0	0	0	1	0	1	0	0	0	0	0	1	1	0
26	DF	(Scotland) Andy Robertson	0	0	0	0	0	0	1	0	0	0	0	0	0	0	0	1	0	0
30	DF	(Netherlands) Jeremie Frimpong	1	0	0	0	0	0	0	0	0	0	0	0	0	0	0	1	0	0
38	MF	(Netherlands) Ryan Gravenberch	5	0	0	1	0	0	0	0	0	2	0	0	0	0	0	8	0	0
65	DF	(England) Amara Nallo	0	0	0	0	0	0	0	0	1	0	0	0	0	0	0	0	0	1
Total			57	0	1	5	0	0	2	1	1	16	0	0	3	0	0	83	1	2

== Club awards ==
=== Player of the Month award ===
Awarded monthly to the player that was chosen by fans voting on liverpoolfc.com

Month	Player	Ref.
August	(Hungary) Dominik Szoboszlai	
September	(Italy) Federico Chiesa	
October	(Hungary) Dominik Szoboszlai	
November	(Hungary) Dominik Szoboszlai	
December	(France) Hugo Ekitike	
January	(Germany) Florian Wirtz	
February	(Hungary) Dominik Szoboszlai	
March	(Hungary) Dominik Szoboszlai	
April	(Egypt) Mohamed Salah	

=== Player of the Season award ===
Dominik Szoboszlai won the Player of the Season award.
