= Dominik Szoboszlai =

Hungarian footballer (born 2000)

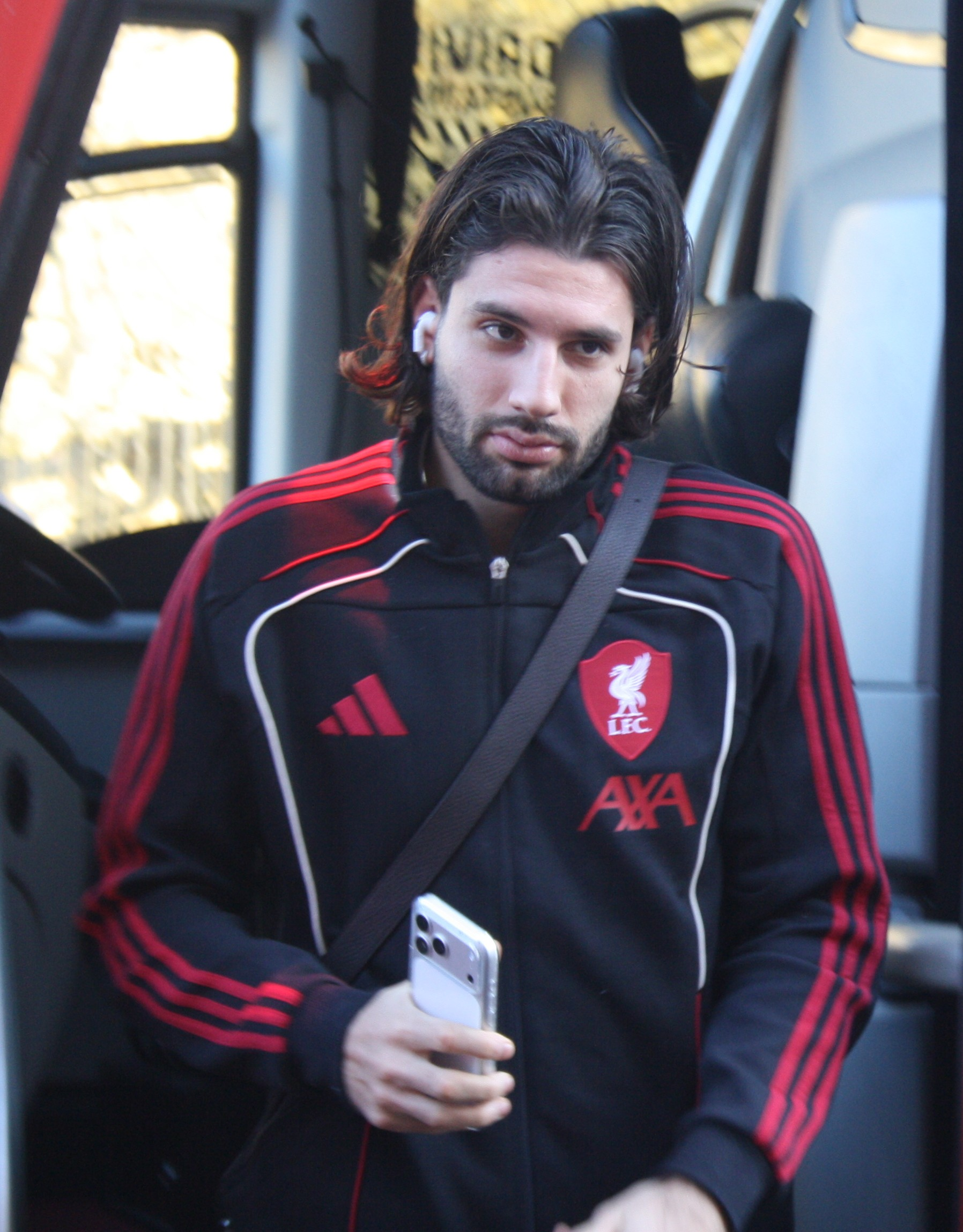
- Szoboszlai with Liverpool in 2026

Personal information
- Full name: Dominik Szoboszlai
- Date of birth: 25 October 2000 (age 26)
- Place of birth: Székesfehérvár, Hungary
- Height: 1.86 m (6 ft 1 in)
- Position: Midfielder

Team information
- Current team: Liverpool
- Number: 8

Youth career
- 2006–2007: Fehérvár FC
- 2007–2015: Főnix Gold
- 2015–2016: MTK Budapest
- 2016–2017: Főnix Gold

Senior career*
Years	Team	Apps	(Gls)
2017–2018	FC Liefering	42	(16)
2018–2021	Red Bull Salzburg	56	(16)
2021–2023	RB Leipzig	62	(12)
2023–	Liverpool	114	(17)

International career^{‡}
2016–2017	Hungary U17	10	(3)
2016–2018	Hungary U19	5	(2)
2017–2018	Hungary U21	8	(2)
2019–	Hungary	71	(18)
- * Club domestic league appearances and goals as of 22 November 2026 (UTC) ‡ National team caps and goals as of 17 November 2026 (UTC)

Dominik Szoboszlai (Hungarian pronunciation: [ˈsoboslɒi ˈdominik] SO-bo-sloy; born 25 October 2000) is a Hungarian professional footballer who plays and serves as vice-captain for Premier League club Liverpool and captains the Hungary national team. A versatile player, Szoboszlai can be deployed as a central or attacking midfielder, wide midfielder, or right-back.

Coming through the youth system, Szoboszlai made his senior debut in 2017 with Austrian club FC Liefering, the reserve team of Red Bull Salzburg. In January 2018, Szoboszlai debuted with the parent club, becoming a starter from the 2018–19 season. Following three seasons, where he helped his club win three league titles and two domestic cups, in January 2021, Szoboszlai moved to Germany at RB Leipzig, a club associated with Red Bull Salzburg, for a reported fee of €20 million, making him the most expensive Hungarian footballer of all time. In his three seasons at the club he helped his side win two DFB-Pokal titles. In July 2023, he joined Liverpool after they paid his release clause of €70 million, making him the club's fourth-most expensive signing of all time. Szoboszlai won the EFL Cup in his first season in England, securing the Premier League the following year.

Szoboszlai represented Hungary internationally, both at youth and senior levels. He made his senior debut at the Euro 2020 qualifiers, helping his country qualify to the finals by scoring in the last minute in the play-offs against Iceland.

== Club career ==
=== FC Liefering ===
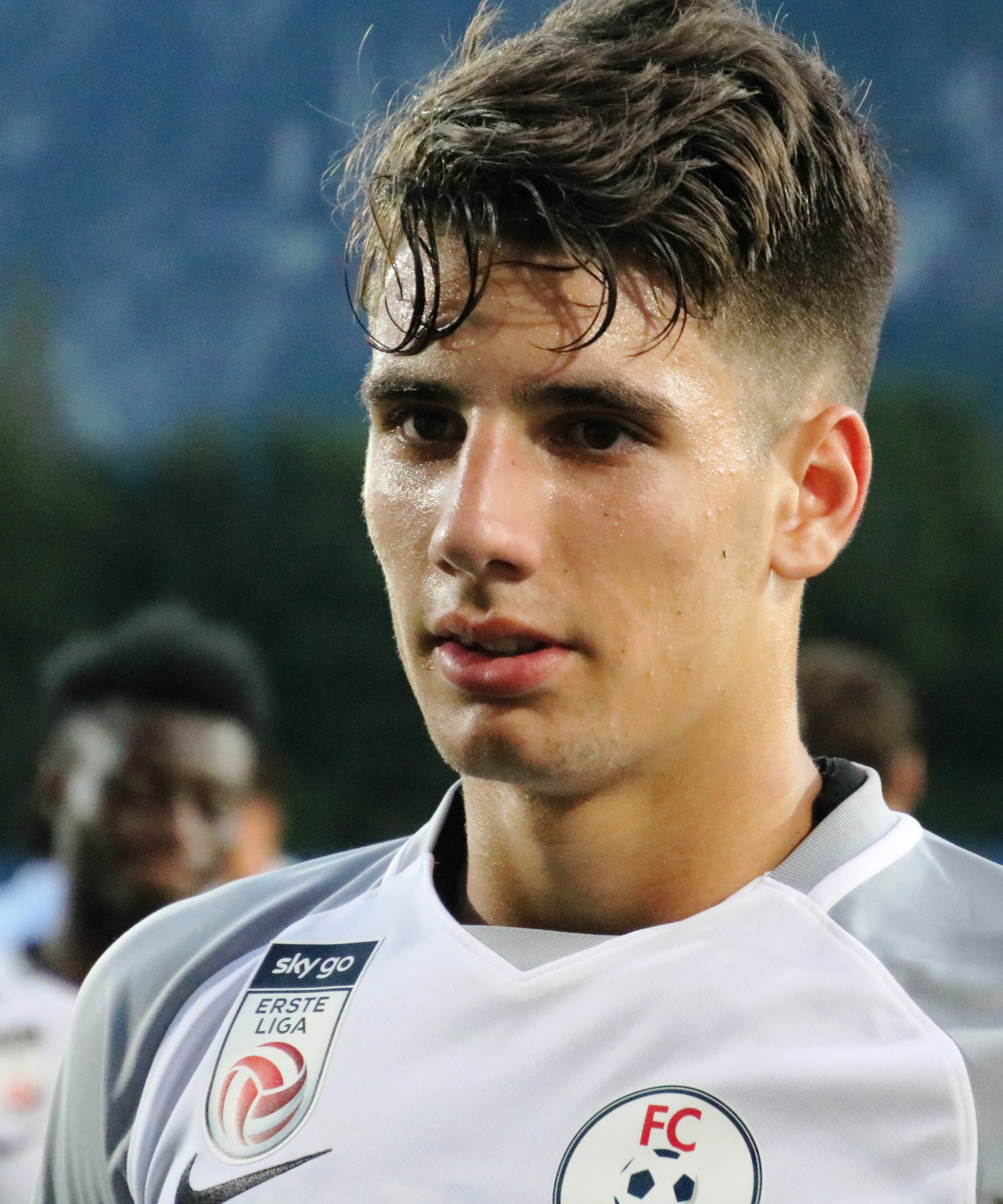
Szoboszlai with Liefering in 2017

Szoboszlai made his professional debut in the 2017–18 campaign, playing for the FC Liefering in the second division against Kapfenberg on 21 July 2017. He scored his first professional goal against FC Blau-Weiß Linz on 4 August 2017.

=== Red Bull Salzburg ===
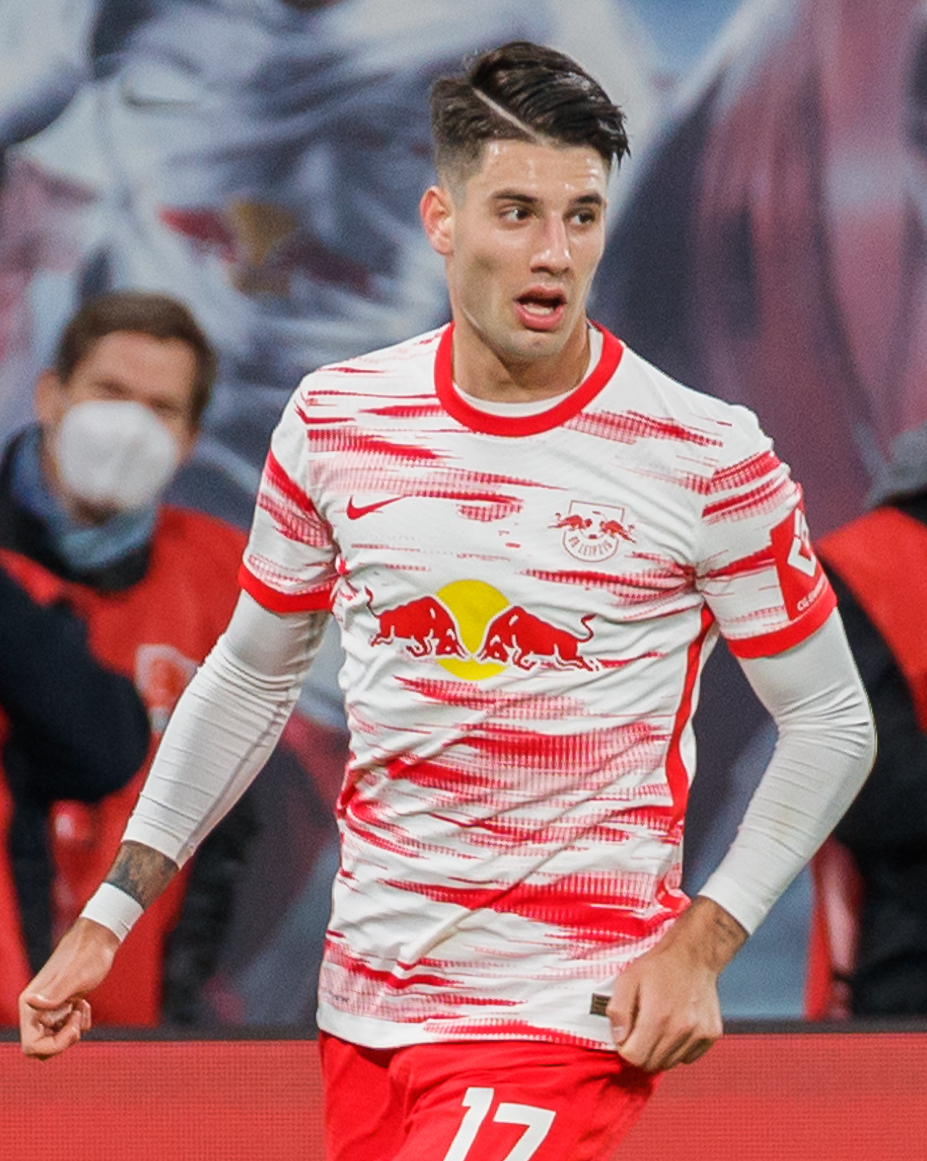
Szoboszlai with RB Leipzig in 2021

During the 2017–18 season, he made his debut against Austria Wien on 27 May 2018. He entered the pitch in the 57th minute as a substitute for Enock Mwepu. He scored his first goal for the club in 6–0 Austrian Cup win against SC Eglo Schwarz. He scored his first league goal against Wacker Innsbruck on 17 March 2019. On 17 September 2019, he made his Champions League debut and scored his first goal in this competition against Genk in a 6–2 victory.

He scored a hat-trick as Salzburg won 5–1 against Sturm Graz on 10 June 2020. He finished the season with 9 goals and 14 assists in 27 league matches, and was voted player of the season for 2019–20 in Austrian football's top tier, the Bundesliga.

=== RB Leipzig ===
On 17 December 2020, RB Leipzig announced the signing of Szoboszlai on a four-and-a-half-year contract, until June 2025. He became eligible to play in January 2021. With a reported price of €20 million, Szoboszlai became the most expensive Hungarian player in history. However, he could not feature in any match for RB Leipzig in the 2020–21 season due to a long-term injury.

Szoboszlai debuted for Leipzig on 7 August 2021 in a German Cup game against SV Sandhausen, where he entered the pitch in the 78th minute and scored three minutes later. On 20 August, he scored his first two goals in the Bundesliga in a 4–0 win over VfB Stuttgart. On 17 April 2022, he scored the only goal of the match between Bayer Leverkusen and Leipzig on the 30th game week of the 2021–22 Bundesliga. Throughout the 2021–22 league season, he made 31 appearances and scored 6 goals.

In the 2022–23 Bundesliga season, Szoboszlai again totalled 31 appearances and 6 goals. He scored his first goal of the season in a 3–0 victory against Borussia Dortmund on 10 September 2022. On 27 January 2023, he scored a double against VfB Stuttgart to secure a 2–1 victory at the Red Bull Arena on the 18th matchday. He later scored the third goal in a surprise 3–1 win over Bayern Munich at the Allianz Arena on 20 May on the 33rd matchday. On 3 June, he scored the second goal in a 2–0 win against Eintracht Frankfurt in the DFB-Pokal final at the Olympiastadion in Berlin.

=== Liverpool FC ===
==== 2023–24 season ====
On 2 July 2023, Premier League club Liverpool signed Szoboszlai on a five-year contract after triggering his release clause which was reportedly worth £60 million. He is the third Hungarian player to make a first-team appearance at the club. On 13 August, Szoboszlai made his debut for Liverpool in their opening game of the 2023–24 season, a 1–1 away draw against Chelsea. On 19 August, he made his competitive debut at Anfield, in a 3–1 victory against Bournemouth. He was widely praised for his performance and Liverpool fans voted to name him the player of the match. On 3 September, Szoboszlai scored his first goal for Liverpool in a 3–0 win over Aston Villa, using his weak foot to strike from outside the box in the third minute and becoming the first Hungarian to score for the club. On 19 September, he was named Liverpool's Standard Chartered Men's Player of the Month.

By October 2023, Szoboszlai had created the most chances for Liverpool in the Premier League in the 2023–24 season, with 21. This was the highest number of chances created by a Liverpool player in their first nine Premier League appearances for the club since 2003. On 1 January 2024, he suffered a hamstring injury in a Premier League match against Newcastle United. He returned from his injury in a 5–2 win against Norwich City in the FA Cup on 28 January. However, on 7 February, it was revealed that he returned from his injury too early; therefore, he had to miss several matches in February. On 2 March, he again returned from injury in a 1–0 victory over Nottingham Forest.

==== 2024–25 season ====
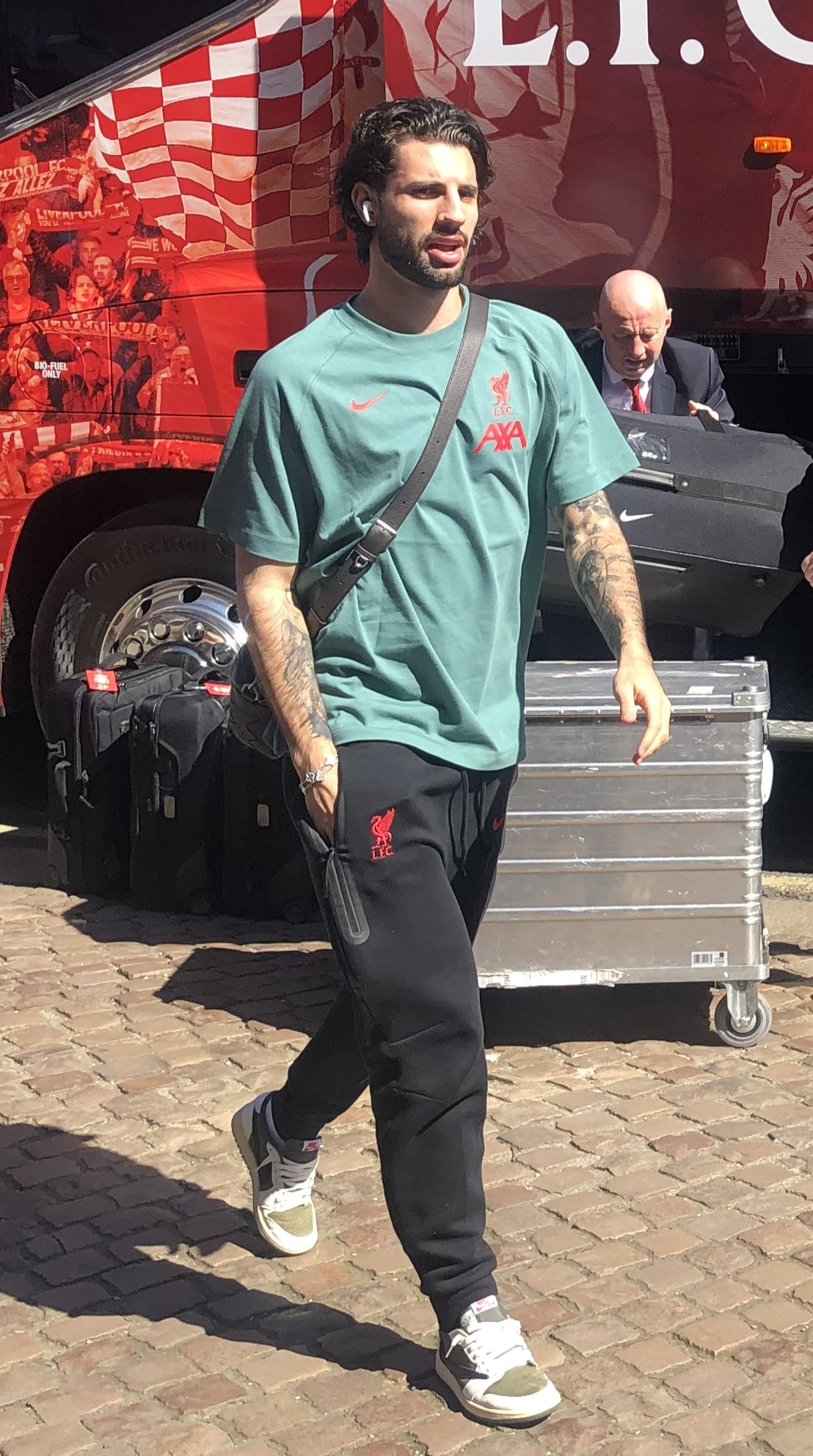
Szoboszlai with Liverpool in 2025

Szoboszlai was named in the starting line-up in Liverpool's first four matches of the 2024–25 season. However, he was criticised by manager Arne Slot for not scoring goals and creating chances. He scored his first goal for Liverpool in the UEFA Champions League in a 3–1 away win against AC Milan at the San Siro on 17 September 2024. On 24 November, Szoboszlai scored his first Premier League goal of the season in a 3–2 away victory over Southampton.

On 25 January 2025, Szoboszlai scored the opening goal in a 4–1 victory over Ipswich Town at Anfield. On 6 February, he scored in a 4–0 semi-final victory against Tottenham Hotspur in the EFL Cup, helping his team advance to the final. On 23 February, Szoboszlai both scored a goal and assisted one for Mohamed Salah in a 2–0 victory against Manchester City at the Etihad Stadium. In the following match against Newcastle United on 26 February, he was named player of the match by fans as he scored the first goal in a 2–0 victory to help extend Liverpool's lead to 13 points at the top of the table. On 27 April, Szoboszlai became the first Hungarian footballer to win the Premier League, following Liverpool's 5–1 victory over Tottenham Hotspur at Anfield in which he provided two assists for Mohamed Salah and Luis Díaz.

==== 2025–26 season ====
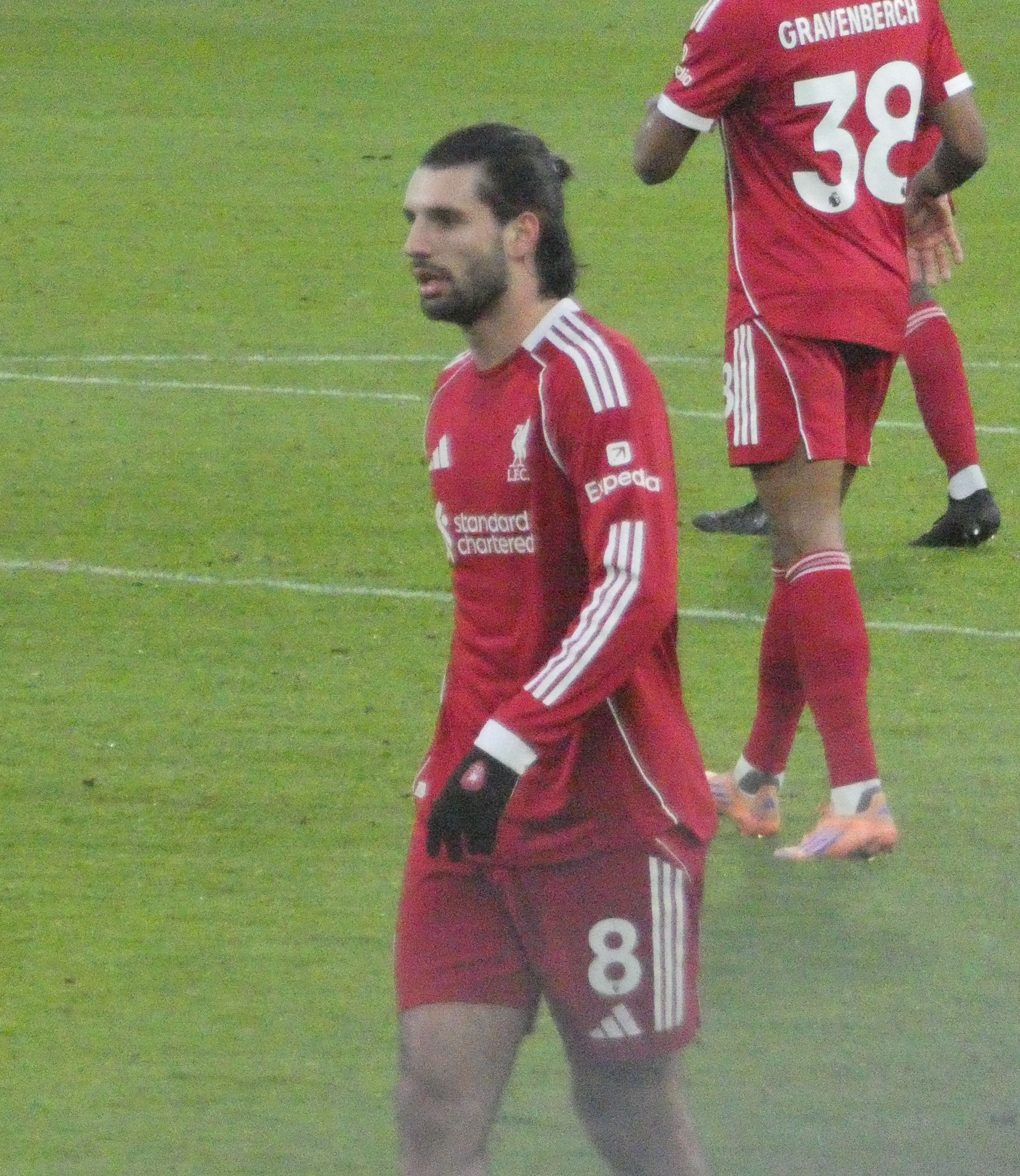
Szoboszlai playing for Liverpool in 2026

On 10 August 2025, Szoboszlai scored a penalty in the shoot-out against Crystal Palace in the FA Community Shield after a 2–2 draw at Wembley Stadium, which his side would ultimately lose. On 25 August, he was voted the player of the match in a 3–2 league victory against Newcastle United, in which he started as a right-back and played a crucial role in the winning goal for Rio Ngumoha. On 31 August, Szoboszlai scored a free kick from 32 yards out in a 1–0 win over Arsenal and was again named player of the match. The goal was later voted the Premier League Goal of the Month for August, making Szoboszlai the first Hungarian player to win a Premier League monthly award. On 21 January 2026, Szoboszlai netted a free-kick in a 3–0 victory over Marseille in the UEFA Champions League and was voted Player of the Match. On 8 February, he scored a free-kick in a 2–1 defeat against Manchester City, however, he was sent off in the stoppage time after committing a foul against Erling Haaland in the penalty area. At the end of the season, he received the Liverpool's Men's Player of the Season award.

==== 2026–27 season ====
On 17 July 2026, Szoboszlai signed a new five-year contract with Liverpool, keeping him at the club at least until the summer of 2031. On 21 August 2026, it was announced that Szoboszlai would serve as part of Liverpool's leadership team as vice-captain. On 23 August, in Liverpool's first game of the season, Szoboszlai scored a stoppage-time penalty to level the score against Newcastle United in an eventual 2–2 draw. On 9 September, Szoboszlai scored Liverpool's opening goal in their first game of their UEFA Champions League campaign, helping his club to a 2–1 win over Atlético Madrid. On 15 September, Szoboszlai scored a 91st-minute goal from 25 yards out to seal a 3–1 victory against Tottenham Hotspur, Liverpool's first match of their EFL Cup campaign. Aadam Patel of BBC Sport described the goal as "a Steven Gerrard-esque thunderbolt".

== International career ==
=== Youth ===
Szoboszlai was captain of the Hungary U17 team during the 2017 UEFA European Under-17 Championship in Croatia. He scored two goals as his team finished sixth in this tournament. He also captained the Hungary U19 team during the 2019 UEFA European Under-19 Championship campaign. He made his debut for the U21 team against Germany on 1 September 2017.

=== Senior ===
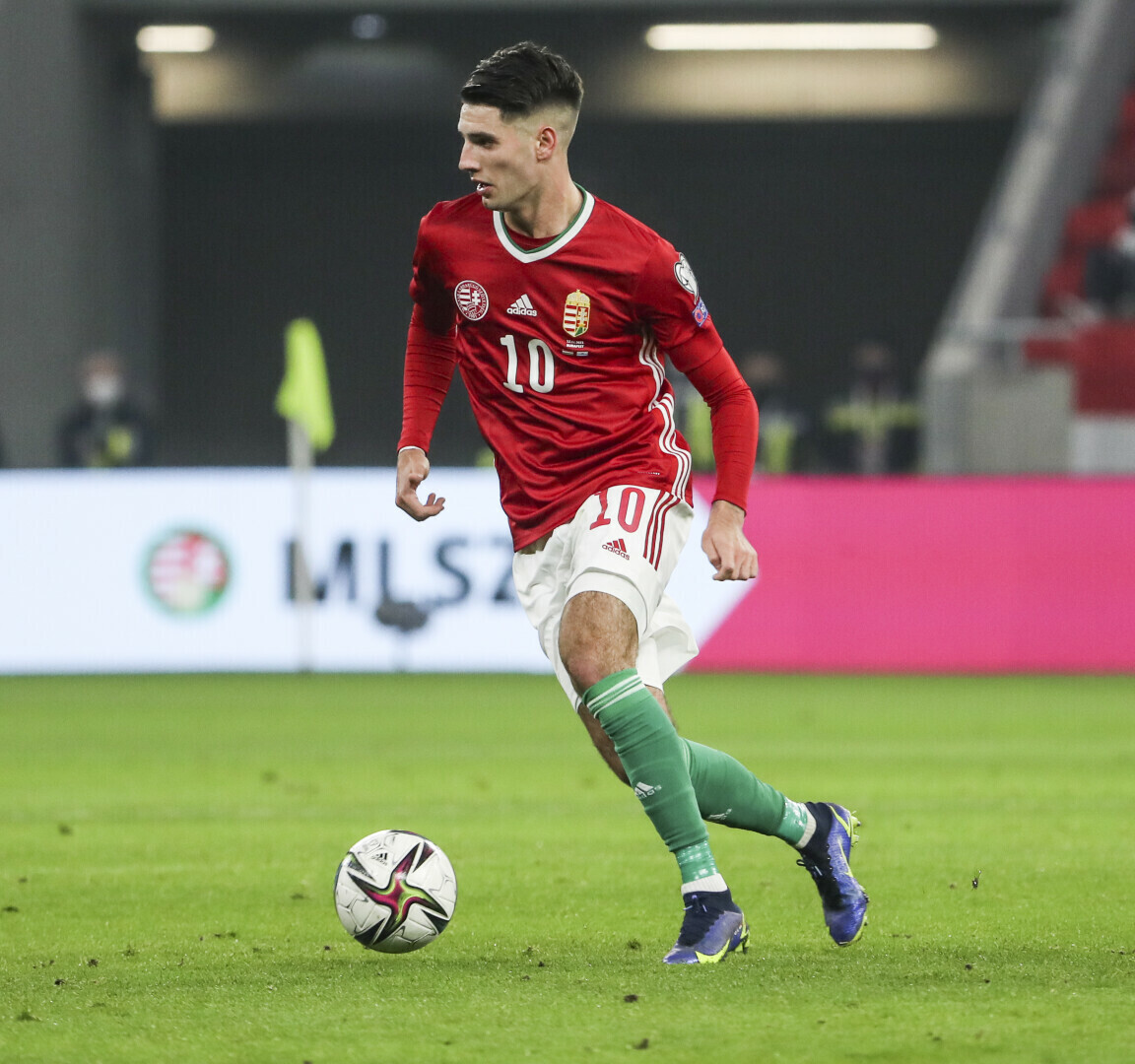
Szoboszlai playing for Hungary in 2021

Szoboszlai received his first call-up to the senior Hungary squad for the friendly against Russia and a 2018 FIFA World Cup qualifier against Andorra in June 2017. On 21 March 2019, Szoboszlai made his first appearance for the Hungarian senior team as a 54th-minute substitute for László Kleinheisler in a UEFA Euro 2020 qualifier against Slovakia. Three days later, he made his first start in a 2–1 win over Croatia.

On 9 September 2019, Szoboszlai scored his first international goal in a 2–1 loss to Slovakia.

In the UEFA Euro 2020 qualifying play-off match against Iceland, Szoboszlai scored a last minute winning goal to send Hungary to Euro 2020. Despite being initially selected in Hungary's squad for the Euro 2020 finals, Szoboszlai withdrew on 1 June 2021 due to an injury.

On 4 June 2022, Szoboszlai scored the only goal of a 1–0 win over England from a penalty kick in the 2022–23 UEFA Nations League A, which was Hungary's first win against England since 1962.

After the retirement of Ádám Szalai and long-term injury of Péter Gulácsi, Hungary manager Marco Rossi appointed Szoboszlai as the new captain of the national team in November 2022. Shortly after a friendly match against Luxembourg, Rossi said in an interview with M4 that Szoboszlai could become a top player soon, which is why he was elected captain.

On 27 March 2023, Szoboszlai scored his first goal as captain against Bulgaria in a 3–0 victory for Hungary in the UEFA Euro 2024 qualifying at the Puskás Aréna. Later that year, on 19 November, he scored twice in a 3–1 victory over Montenegro, securing his country's qualification to Euro 2024 as Group G winners.

On 14 May 2024, Szoboszlai was named in Hungary's squad for UEFA Euro 2024. On 15 June, he became the youngest captain to feature in the European competition, aged 23 years and 234 days, in which he provided an assist in a 3–1 defeat against Switzerland in Hungary's opening match of the tournament. He went on to start against both Germany and Scotland as the Magyars finished third in Group A.

On 19 November 2024, he scored a panenka penalty kick in the 98th minute of a 1–1 draw against Germany on the last group match of the 2024–25 UEFA Nations League A season.

On 14 October 2025, he scored a goal for the national team in a 2–2 draw against Portugal in the 2026 FIFA World Cup qualification group match at the Estádio José Alvalade, Lisbon, Portugal. He scored the second Hungarian goal of the match in the 91st minute.

== Player profile ==
=== Style of play ===
Szoboszlai has been described as a box-to-box midfielder. According to Bundesliga expert Raphael Honigstein, "he's a very technical player, very easy on the eye, quite tall as well, so he looks imposing".

In an interview published on Nemzeti Sport, his manager, Mátyás Esterházy, said that Szoboszlai is a versatile footballer since he plays different positions in Liverpool and the national team. While he has a defined role in Liverpool, Marco Rossi gives more freedom to him in the national team.

In the 2025–26 season, Szoboszlai was noted for his tactical versatility and work rate, having been deployed not only as an attacking midfielder but also in deeper midfield roles and at right-back. Writing for The Athletic, Andy Jones and Gregg Evans highlighted his passing range, pressing intensity and goal contributions, describing him as capable of influencing matches both offensively and defensively. According to BBC Sport, Szoboszlai ranked among Liverpool's most active players in terms of distance covered and sprint statistics during the campaign.

=== Reception ===
Szoboszlai is often referred to as Hungary's leading footballer. He has frequently been compared to compatriot Ferenc Puskás, with Hungarian football pundit Ábel Mészáros saying: "Szoboszlai is ahead of everyone since Lajos Détári. You really have to go far back… He is approaching the realm of Puskás and others in that class."

In 2023, Szoboszlai was listed as the 52nd best footballer in the world by The Guardian. In the same year, he was also included in FourFourTwo’s list of the 100 Best Football Players in the World 2023.

Following Liverpool’s 3–0 victory over Brighton & Hove Albion in the FA Cup fourth round on 14 February 2026, Mohamed Salah described Szoboszlai as “one of the best players in the world right now”. In the same in-depth analysis for The Athletic, Andy Jones and Gregg Evans highlighted Szoboszlai's versatility, goal contributions, passing range and leadership, concluding that his performances during the season had earned him a place in discussions about belonging among the best players in the world. In a BBC Sport article, Aadam Patel described him as Liverpool's “key man”.

== Personal life ==
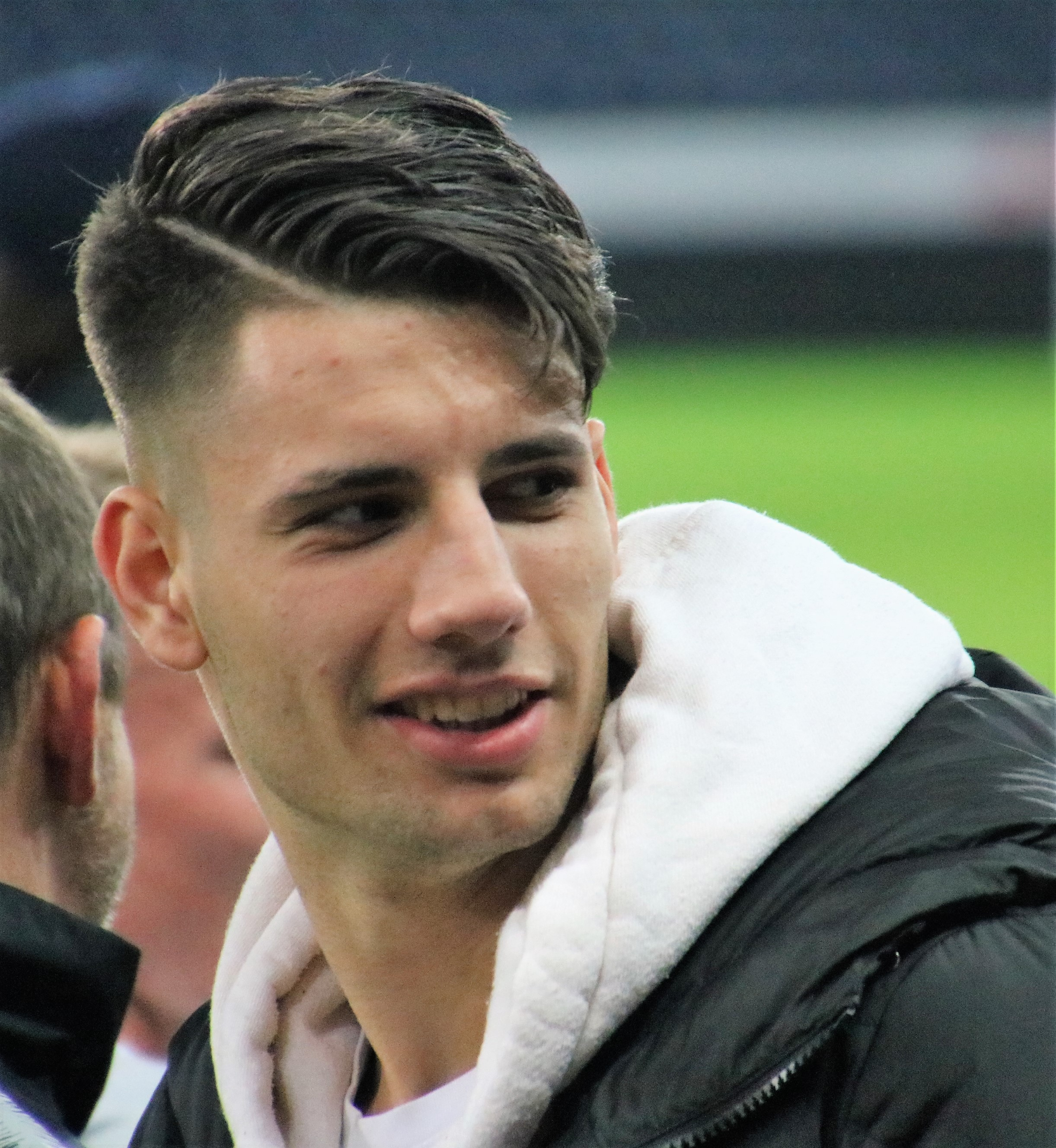
Szoboszlai in 2019

Szoboszlai was born in Székesfehérvár to Zsanett (née Németh) and former footballer Zsolt Szoboszlai, who played in the lower leagues of Austria. He has a sister, named Szofi, born in 2017.

In addition to his native Hungarian, Szoboszlai also speaks fluent English and German.

In 2022, he donated to the charity Cseppkő Gyermekotthoni Központ along with Ádám Szalai. In 2023, he donated a shirt to the foundation that helped to raise money for the family of late Csaba Ponczok, former player of Maglódi TC, who died in 2022.

On 13 March 2024, Hungarian telecommunications company Magyar Telekom announced a long-term partnership agreement with Szoboszlai where the two parties will work together in encouraging Hungarians not to give up in difficult circumstances.

On 16 October 2024, Szoboszlai announced that he was engaged to Borka Buzsik, a PR manager for the Hungarian company Toman Diet. The couple married on 25 March 2025 in Budapest. On 19 May 2025, Szoboszlai scored the second goal in a 3–2 defeat against Brighton & Hove Albion in the 2024–25 Premier League. His goal celebration revealed that his wife is expecting their first child. Their child, a daughter, was born in August 2025.

== Career statistics ==
=== Club ===
As of match played 22 November 2026

Appearances and goals by club, season and competition
Club	Season	League			National cup (Note: Includes Austrian Cup, DFB-Pokal, FA Cup)		League cup (Note: Includes EFL Cup)		Europe		Other		Total	
Club	Season	Division	Apps	Goals	Apps	Goals	Apps	Goals	Apps	Goals	Apps	Goals	Apps	Goals
FC Liefering	2017–18	2. Liga	33	10	—		—		—		—		33	10
FC Liefering	2018–19	2. Liga	9	6	—		—		—		—		9	6
FC Liefering	Total		42	16	—		—		—		—		42	16
Red Bull Salzburg	2017–18	Austrian Bundesliga	1	0	0	0	—		—		—		1	0
Red Bull Salzburg	2018–19	Austrian Bundesliga	16	3	3	2	—		1 (Note: Appearance(s) in UEFA Europa League)	0	—		20	5
Red Bull Salzburg	2019–20	Austrian Bundesliga	27	9	6	2	—		7 (Note: Five appearances and one goal in UEFA Champions League, two appearances in UEFA Europa League)	1	—		40	12
Red Bull Salzburg	2020–21	Austrian Bundesliga	12	4	2	1	—		8 (Note: Appearances in UEFA Champions League)	4	—		22	9
Red Bull Salzburg	Total		56	16	11	5	—		16	5	—		83	26
RB Leipzig	2020–21	Bundesliga	0	0	0	0	—		0	0	—		0	0
RB Leipzig	2021–22	Bundesliga	31	6	5	2	—		9 (Note: Four appearances and two goals in UEFA Champions League, five appearances in UEFA Europa League)	2	—		45	10
RB Leipzig	2022–23	Bundesliga	31	6	6	3	—		8	1	1 (Note: Appearance in DFL-Supercup)	0	46	10
RB Leipzig	Total		62	12	11	5	—		17	3	1	0	91	20
Liverpool	2023–24	Premier League	33	3	2	0	3	2	7	2	—		45	7
Liverpool	2024–25	Premier League	36	6	1	0	3	1	9	1	—		49	8
Liverpool	2025–26	Premier League	36	6	4	2	0	0	12	5	1 (Note: Appearance in FA Community Shield)	0	53	13
Liverpool	2026–27	Premier League	9	2	0	0	1	1	2	1	—		12	4
Liverpool	Total		114	17	7	2	7	4	30	9	1	0	159	32
Career total			274	61	29	12	7	4	63	17	2	0	375	94

=== International ===
As of match played 17 November 2026

Appearances and goals by national team and year
National team	Year	Apps	Goals
Hungary	2019	8	1
Hungary	2020	4	2
Hungary	2021	6	2
Hungary	2022	10	1
Hungary	2023	10	4
Hungary	2024	13	5
Hungary	2025	10	2
Hungary	2026	10	1
Total		71	18

As of match played 17 November 2026
Scores and results list Hungary's goal tally first, score column indicates score after each Szoboszlai goal

List of international goals scored by Dominik Szoboszlai
No.	Date	Venue	Opponent	Score	Result	Competition
1	9 September 2019	Groupama Aréna, Budapest, Hungary	Slovakia	1–1	1–2	UEFA Euro 2020 qualifying
2	3 September 2020	New Sivas 4 Eylül Stadium, Sivas, Turkey	Turkey	1–0	1–0	2020–21 UEFA Nations League B
3	12 November 2020	Puskás Aréna, Budapest, Hungary	Iceland	2–1	2–1	UEFA Euro 2020 qualifying
4	12 November 2021	Puskás Aréna, Budapest, Hungary	San Marino	1–0	4–0	2022 FIFA World Cup qualification
5	12 November 2021	Puskás Aréna, Budapest, Hungary	San Marino	3–0	4–0	2022 FIFA World Cup qualification
6	4 June 2022	Puskás Aréna, Budapest, Hungary	England	1–0	1–0	2022–23 UEFA Nations League A
7	27 March 2023	Puskás Aréna, Budapest, Hungary	Bulgaria	2–0	3–0	UEFA Euro 2024 qualifying
8	17 October 2023	Darius and Girėnas Stadium, Kaunas, Lithuania	Lithuania	1–2	2–2	UEFA Euro 2024 qualifying
9	19 November 2023	Puskás Aréna, Budapest, Hungary	Montenegro	1–1	3–1	UEFA Euro 2024 qualifying
10	19 November 2023	Puskás Aréna, Budapest, Hungary	Montenegro	2–1	3–1	UEFA Euro 2024 qualifying
11	22 March 2024	Puskás Aréna, Budapest, Hungary	Turkey	1–0	1–0	Friendly
12	26 March 2024	Puskás Aréna, Budapest, Hungary	Kosovo	1–0	2–0	Friendly
13	14 October 2024	Bilino Polje, Zenica, Bosnia and Herzegovina	Bosnia and Herzegovina	1–0	2–0	2024–25 UEFA Nations League A
14	14 October 2024	Bilino Polje, Zenica, Bosnia and Herzegovina	Bosnia and Herzegovina	2–0	2–0	2024–25 UEFA Nations League A
15	19 November 2024	Puskás Aréna, Budapest, Hungary	Germany	1–1	1–1	2024–25 UEFA Nations League A
16	10 June 2025	Dalga Arena, Baku, Azerbaijan	Azerbaijan	2–1	2–1	Friendly
17	14 October 2025	Estádio José Alvalade, Lisbon, Portugal	Portugal	2–2	2–2	2026 FIFA World Cup qualification
18	9 June 2026	Nagyerdei Stadion, Debrecen, Hungary	Kazakhstan	1–1	3–1	Friendly

== Honours ==
Red Bull Salzburg

- Austrian Bundesliga: 2017–18, 2018–19, 2019–20, 2020–21
- Austrian Cup: 2018–19, 2019–20, 2020–21

RB Leipzig

- DFB-Pokal: 2021–22, 2022–23

Liverpool

- Premier League: 2024–25
- EFL Cup: 2023–24; runner-up: 2024–25
- FA Community Shield runner-up: 2025

Individual

- Austrian Second League Team of the Season: 2017–18
- Austrian Bundesliga Player of the Season: 2019–20
- Austrian Bundesliga Team of the Season: 2019–20
- Bundesliga Rookie of The Month: August 2021, October 2021, April 2022
- Hungarian Golden Ball: 2020, 2022, 2023, 2024, 2025
- Hungarian Sportsman of The Year: 2020, 2023
- Liverpool Men's Player of the Season: 2025–26
- Liverpool Goal of the Season: 2025–26
- Premier League Fan Team of the Season: 2025–26
- Premier League Goal of the Month: August 2025
- BBC Goal of the Month: August 2025, February 2026
