= Hungarian Golden Ball =

The Hungarian Golden Ball (Hungarian: Magyar Aranylabda) is annually awarded in Hungary by a vote by Hungarian sport journalists. Eligible are Hungarian players in the Hungary and abroad.

The other football award in Hungary is the Hungarian Footballer of the Year awarded by the Hungarian Football Federation (MLSZ).

== History ==
The Hungarian Golden Ball was founded in 1998 by Imre Mátyás, the founder and editor of online news portal Nb1.hu.

== Winners ==
Year	Player	Club
1998	Gabor Király	(Germany) Hertha BSC
1999	Gabor Király (2)	(Germany) Hertha BSC
2000	Gabor Király (3)	(Germany) Hertha BSC
2001	Gabor Király (4)	(Germany) Hertha BSC
2002	Krisztián Lisztes	(Germany) Werder Bremen
2003	Imre Szabics	(Germany) VfB Stuttgart
2004	Zoltán Gera	(England) West Brom
2005	Zoltán Gera (2)	(England) West Brom
2006	Pál Dárdai	(Germany) Hertha BSC
2007	Tamás Hajnal	(Germany) Karlsruher SC
2008	Tamás Hajnal (2)	(Germany) BVB
2009	Roland Juhász	(Belgium) Anderlecht
2010	Balázs Dzsudzsák	(Netherlands) PSV
2011	Roland Juhász (2)	(Belgium) Anderlecht
2012	Ádám Szalai	(Germany) Mainz 05
2013	Szabolcs Huszti	(Germany) Hannover 96
2014	Balázs Dzsudzsák (2)	(Russia) Dynamo (Moscow)
2015	Gabor Király (5)	(Hungary) Haladás
2016	Ádám Nagy	(Italy) Bologna
2017	Nemanja Nikolić	(United States) Chicago Fire
2018	Péter Gulácsi	(Germany) RB Leipzig
2019	Péter Gulácsi (2)	(Germany) RB Leipzig
2020	Dominik Szoboszlai	(Germany) RB Leipzig
2021	András Schäfer	(Slovakia) DAC
2022	Dominik Szoboszlai (2)	(Germany) RB Leipzig
2023	Dominik Szoboszlai (3)	(England) Liverpool
2024	Dominik Szoboszlai (4)	(England) Liverpool
2025	Dominik Szoboszlai (5)	(England) Liverpool

== See also ==
- Hungarian Footballer of the Year
