= Roland Juhász =

Hungarian footballer (born 1983)

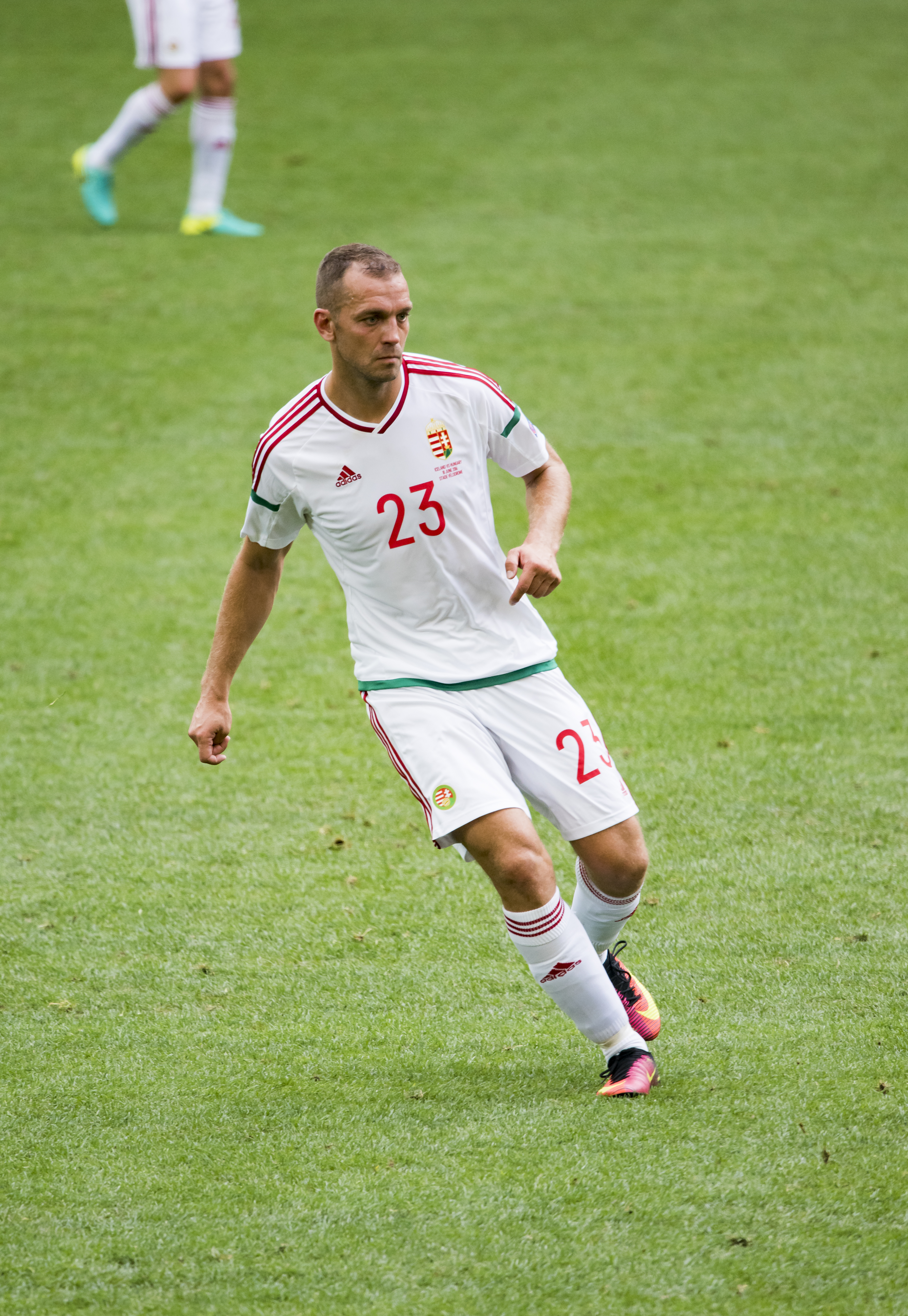
- Juhász with Hungary at the UEFA Euro 2016

Personal information
- Full name: Roland Juhász
- Date of birth: 1 July 1983 (age 43)
- Place of birth: Cegléd, Hungary
- Height: 1.93 m (6 ft 4 in)
- Position: Centre-back

Team information
- Current team: Fehérvár (assistant manager)

Youth career
- –1999: Tápiószecső

Senior career*
Years	Team	Apps	(Gls)
1999–2005	MTK	107	(12)
2002	→ BKV Előre (loan)	3	(1)
2005–2013	Anderlecht	207	(20)
2013	→ Videoton (loan)	9	(3)
2013–2020	Fehérvár	177	(20)
Total		433	(56)

International career
1998–1999	Hungary U15	2	(0)
1999–2000	Hungary U16	16	(1)
2005	Hungary U21	2	(0)
2004–2016	Hungary	95	(6)

Managerial career
- 2020–: Fehérvár (assistant manager)
- * Club domestic league appearances and goals

Roland Juhász (Hungarian pronunciation: [ˈrolɒnd ˈjuhaːs]; born 1 July 1983) is a Hungarian former professional footballer who played as a centre-back.

== Career ==
=== MTK Budapest ===
Juhász spent his youth career in Tápiószecső playing for the local club Tápiószecső FC. He started his professional career at the MTK Budapest FC in 1999. Playing 107 Hungarian League matches and scoring 12 goals convinced the Hungary national football team coach to list him in the squad. Juhasz became Hungarian League champion in the 2002–03 season with MTK Budapest. At the end of the 2004–05 season of the Hungarian League, the Belgian club RSC Anderlecht signed him.

=== Anderlecht ===
Juhász signed with Anderlecht on 29 August 2005. He made his debut for the club against Chelsea in the UEFA Champions League. On 19 September 2005, he fractured a bone in his foot which meant that Anderlecht were deprived of the services of the Hungarian defender for several weeks.

Juhász became Belgian Pro League champion four times with the club in the 2005–06, 2006–07, 2009–10, 2011–12 seasons. In 2009, he was voted as the Best Defender of the Belgian First Division and Player of the Year for 2009 by the Hungarian Football Federation.

In 2011 Juhász was voted as the Best Hungarian Football Player of the Year for 2011.

On 8 August 2011, it was announced that Ally McCoist's Rangers F.C. could not agree with Anderlecht on a transfer fee for Juhász. Anderlecht rejected the £3 million-plus offer from Rangers despite the sum matching a release fee Juhász thought had been agreed with his employers 12 months previously. Juhász's agent suggested this could ruin the player's career.

On 18 November 2011, Celtic F.C. was linked with a £2.6 million deal for Juhász, with Celtic manager Neil Lennon stating that Juhász fit the bill. However, Juhász instead extended his contract with Anderlecht until 2014.

=== Videoton (on loan) ===
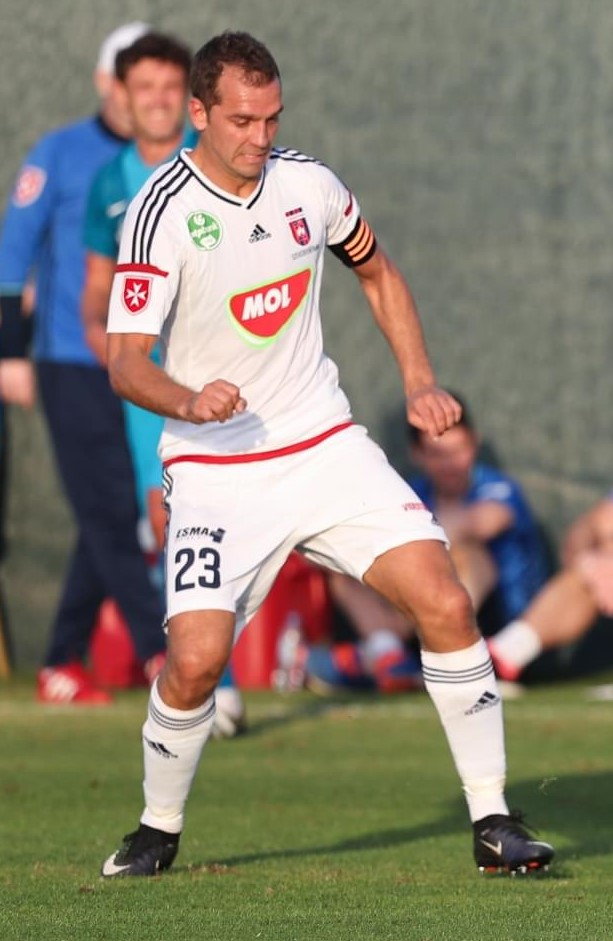
Juhász with Videoton in 2013

On 19 February 2013, the agreement with the Hungarian League club Videoton FC was announced on Anderlecht's website, although it was not confirmed by the Hungarian club until 20 February 2013. Roland Juhász joined the champions of the 2010–11 season on a loan deal until the end of the 2012–13 season.

== International career ==
Juhasz's debut came on 25 April 2004 in a friendly with Japan, which he marked with a goal. On 7 September, Hungary started the FIFA world cup 2014 qualifying with a 5–0 win in Andorra, Juhász scored the first goal. On 31 May 2016, Juhász was selected for the Hungarian squad at the Euro 2016 tournament in France.

On 18 June 2016, Juhász played in a 1–1 draw against Iceland at the Stade Vélodrome, Marseille. He also played in the last group match in a 3–3 draw against Portugal at the Parc Olympique Lyonnais, Lyon on 22 June 2016. Juhász announced his retirement from the national team on 5 July 2016.

== Philanthropy ==
In 2011 Juhász along with Szabolcs Huszti financially supported the Hungarian Gyermekkor Alapítvány (Youth Foundation) in order to supply Hungarian hospitals for children with essential and adequate devices.

== Career statistics ==
=== Club ===
Appearances and goals by club, season and competition
Club	Season	League		Cup		League Cup		Europe		Total	
Club	Season	Apps	Goals	Apps	Goals	Apps	Goals	Apps	Goals	Apps	Goals
MTK	1999–00	2	0	0	0	–	–	–	–	2+	0
MTK	2000–01	7	2	0	0	–	–	?	?	7+	2
MTK	2001–02	16	2	?	?	–	–	?	?	16+	2
MTK	2002–03	22	5	?	?	–	–	?	?	22+	5
MTK	2003–04	27	2	?	?	–	–	6	0	33+	2
MTK	2004–05	29	1	?	?	–	–	–	–	29+	1
MTK	2005–06	4	0	0	0	–	–	–	–	4	0
MTK	Total	107	12	0	0	–	–	6+	0	113+	12+
Anderlecht	2005–06	11	0	?	?	–	–	3	0	14+	0
Anderlecht	2006–07	23	1	?	?	–	–	5	1	28+	2
Anderlecht	2007–08	31	0	?	?	–	–	11	0	42+	0
Anderlecht	2008–09	33	4	?	?	–	–	2	0	35+	4
Anderlecht	2009–10	38	6	?	?	–	–	14	1	52+	7
Anderlecht	2010–11	35	5	1	0	–	–	12	3	48	8
Anderlecht	2011–12	36	4	1	1	–	–	9	1	46	6
Anderlecht	2012–13	3	0	1	0	–	–	2	0	6	0
Anderlecht	Total	210	20	3+	1+	–	–	48	6	271+	27+
Videoton	2012–13	9	3	4	0	3	0	–	–	16	3
Videoton	2013–14	19	2	0	0	5	2	–	–	24	4
Videoton	2014–15	25	5	3	0	–	–	–	–	28	5
Videoton	2015–16	24	2	3	0	–	–	4	0	31	2
Videoton	2016–17	30	2	1	0	–	–	1	0	32	2
Videoton	2017–18	29	2	0	0	–	–	8	1	37	3
Videoton	2018–19	30	4	7	1	–	–	13	0	50	5
Videoton	2019–20	20	3	4	0	–	–	4	1	28	4
Videoton	Total	186	23	22	1	8	2	30	2	246	28
Career total		503	55	25+	2+	8	2	84+	8+	620+	67+

=== International ===
Appearances and goals by national team and year
National team	Year	Apps	Goals
Hungary	2004	10	1
Hungary	2005	6	0
Hungary	2006	6	0
Hungary	2007	10	1
Hungary	2008	10	2
Hungary	2009	8	1
Hungary	2010	9	0
Hungary	2011	10	0
Hungary	2012	7	1
Hungary	2013	2	0
Hungary	2014	7	0
Hungary	2015	5	0
Hungary	2016	5	0
Total		95	6

Scores and results list Hungary's goal tally first, score column indicates score after each Juhász goal.

List of international goals scored by Roland Juhász
No.	Date	Venue	Cap	Opponent	Score	Result	Competition
1	25 April 2004	Zalaegerszeg	1	Japan	2–0	3–2	Friendly
2	22 August 2007	Budapest	27	Italy	1–1	3–1	Friendly
3	24 May 2008	Budapest	35	Greece	2–1	3–2	Friendly
4	11 October 2008	Budapest	40	Albania	2–0	2–0	2010 FIFA World Cup qualification
5	1 April 2009	Budapest	44	Malta	3–0	3–0	2010 FIFA World Cup qualification
6	7 September 2012	Andorra la Vella	73	Andorra	1–0	5–0	FIFA World Cup 2014 qualification

== Honours ==
MTK Budapest

- Hungarian League: 2002–03; runner-up 1999–2000
- Hungarian Cup: 1999–2000
- Hungarian Super Cup: 2003

Anderlecht

- Belgian Pro League: 2005–06, 2006–07, 2009–10, 2011–12; runner-up 2007–08, 2008–09
- Belgian Cup: 2007–08
- Belgian Supercup: 2006, 2007, 2010, 2012
- Trofeo Santiago Bernabéu: runner-up 2006

Videoton

- Nemzeti Bajnokság I: 2014–15, 2017–18

Individual

- Young Hungarian Player of the Year: 2005
- Hungarian Football Federation nominated him to be the best domestic footballer of the year: 2008, 2009
- Hungarian Golden Ball: 2009, 2011
- Best defender in the Belgian First Division: 2009
