= Wellity Lucky =

English footballer (born 2006)

Personal information
- Full name: Wellity Lucky Omoruyi
- Date of birth: 12 January 2006 (age 20)
- Place of birth: Zaragoza, Spain
- Height: 1.88 m (6 ft 2 in)
- Position: Centre-back

Team information
- Current team: Liverpool
- Number: 92

Youth career
- Club Deportivo San Gregorio Arrabal
- Real Zaragoza
- 2019–: Liverpool

Senior career*
Years	Team	Apps	(Gls)
2025–	Liverpool	0	(0)

International career^{‡}
2021	England U15	1	(0)
2022	England U16	3	(0)
- * Club domestic league appearances and goals ‡ National team caps and goals as of 18 April 2022

Wellity Lucky Omoruyi (born 12 January 2006) is a professional footballer who plays as a centre-back for Premier League club Liverpool. Born in Spain, he has represented England internationally.

== Early life ==
Lucky was born on 12 January 2006 in Zaragoza, Spain to Nigerian parents. He moved with his family to England at the age of eleven.

== Club career ==
As a youth player, Lucky joined the youth academy of Spanish side Club Deportivo San Gregorio Arrabal. Following his stint there, he joined the youth academy of Spanish side Real Zaragoza. At the age of thirteen, he joined the youth academy of English Premier League side Liverpool.

On 29 October 2025, he made his debut for Liverpool as a second-half substitute for Andy Robertson in a 3–0 EFL Cup defeat against Crystal Palace.

== International career ==
Lucky is an England and Spain youth international. On 15 February 2022, he debuted for the England national under-16 football team during a 0–0 away friendly draw against the Portugal national under-16 football team.

== Style of play ==
Lucky plays as a centre-back and is right-footed. African news website Foot Africa wrote in 2025 that he is "strong in duels and smart in his distribution".

== Career statistics ==
=== Club ===
As of 29 October 2025

Appearances and goals by club, season and competition
Club	Season	League			FA Cup		EFL Cup		Europe		Other		Total	
Club	Season	Division	Apps	Goals	Apps	Goals	Apps	Goals	Apps	Goals	Apps	Goals	Apps	Goals
Liverpool U23	2024–25	—			—		—		—		1 (Note: Appearance in EFL Trophy)	0	1	0
Liverpool U23	2025–26	—			—		—		—		1	0	1	0
Total					—		—		—		2	0	2	0
Liverpool	2025–26	Premier League	0	0	0	0	1	0	0	0	0	0	1	0
Total			0	0	0	0	1	0	0	0	2	0	3	0
