= Mor Talla Ndiaye =

Senegalese footballer (born 2008)

Personal information
- Full name: El Hadji Mor Talla Ndiaye
- Date of birth: 6 January 2008 (age 18)
- Place of birth: Sandiara, Senegal
- Height: 1.88 m (6 ft 2 in)
- Position: Centre-back

Team information
- Current team: Liverpool
- Number: 75

Youth career
- –2024: Bousports Academy
- 2026: Liverpool

Senior career*
Years	Team	Apps	(Gls)
2024–2026	Amitié FC		
2026–	Liverpool		

International career^{‡}
2025	Senegal U17	6	(0)
2025–	Senegal U18	3	(0)
- * Club domestic league appearances and goals ‡ National team caps and goals as of 15 November 2025

El Hadji Mor Talla Ndiaye (born 6 January 2008) is a Senegalese professional footballer who plays as a centre-back for Liverpool.

== Club career ==
As a youth player, Ndiaye joined the youth academy of Senegalese side Bousports Academy. Following his stint there, he signed for Senegalese side Amitié FC in 2024, where he played as a midfielder before switching to a defender. Subsequently, he joined the youth academy of English Premier League side Liverpool.

== International career ==
Ndiaye is a Senegal youth international. During November 2025, he played for the Senegal national under-17 football team at the 2025 FIFA U-17 World Cup.
